= 2025 North Melbourne Football Club season =

Australian rules football season

North Melbourne
2025 season
- President: Jennifer Watt
- Coach: Alastair Clarkson
- Captain: Jy Simpkin
- Home ground: Marvel Stadium (capacity: 53,343)
- Pre-season: 0 wins, 2 losses
- AFL season: 5 wins, 17 losses, 1 draw
- Syd Barker Medal: Harry Sheezel/Tristan Xerri
- Leading goalkicker: Nick Larkey (41)
- Lowest home attendance: 7,395
- Average home attendance: 29,961

The 2025 North Melbourne Football Club season was the club's 101st season of senior competition in the Australian Football League (AFL).

== Overview ==
North Melbourne's 2025 season overview
Captain	Coach	Home ground	W–L–D	Ladder	Finals	Best and fairest	Leading goalkicker	Refs
Jy Simpkin	Alastair Clarkson	Marvel Stadium						

== Squad ==
Players are listed by guernsey number, and 2025 statistics are for AFL regular season and finals series matches during the 2025 AFL season only. Career statistics include a player's complete AFL career, which, as a result, means that a player's debut and part or whole of their career statistics may be for another club. Statistics are correct as of round 17, 2025 and are taken from AFL Tables.

No.	Name	AFL debut	Games (2025)	Goals (2025)	Games (North Melbourne)	Goals (North Melbourne)	Games (AFL career)	Goals (AFL career)
2	Finn O'Sullivan	2025	15	1	15	1	15	1
3	Harry Sheezel	2023	16	4	60	21	60	21
4	Aidan Corr	2013 (Greater Western Sydney)	9	0	73	1	171	3
5	Caleb Daniel	2015 (Western Bulldogs)	16	0	16	0	192	49
6	George Wardlaw	2023	9	3	35	11	35	11
7	Zane Duursma	2024	7	4	20	13	20	13
8	Bailey Scott	2019	8	2	109	34	109	34
9	Luke Davies-Uniacke	2018	16	5	124	46	124	46
10	Colby McKercher	2024	16	9	32	9	32	9
11	Luke McDonald	2014	15	0	218	18	218	18
12	Jy Simpkin	2017	16	10	168	72	168	72
13	Darcy Tucker	2016 (Fremantle)	7	0	48	9	156	44
14	Luke Urquhart	****	0	0	0	0	0	0
15	Dylan Stephens	2020 (Sydney)	15	3	15	3	74	14
16	Zac Fisher	2017 (Carlton)	7	2	25	2	132	55
17	Riley Hardeman	2024	12	0	15	0	15	0
18	Wil Dawson	2024	2	0	5	0	5	0
19	Griffin Logue	2017 (Fremantle)	9	0	26	1	90	10
20	Nick Larkey	2017	16	38	133	275	133	275
21	Callum Coleman-Jones	2019 (Richmond)	0	0	22	9	31	20
22	Taylor Goad	****	0	0	0	0	0	0
23	Geordie Payne	****	0	0	0	0	0	0
24	Tom Powell	2021	16	4	84	29	84	29
25	Paul Curtis	2022	13	25	72	85	72	85
26	Luke Parker	2011 (Sydney)	15	10	15	10	308	223
27	Miller Bergman	2022	0	0	16	0	16	0
28	Jack Darling	2011 (West Coast)	15	13	15	13	313	545
29	Will Phillips	2021	5	0	48	8	48	8
30	Charlie Comben	2021	13	0	41	8	41	8
31	Josh Goater	2022	0	0	12	0	12	0
32	Toby Pink	2024	10	0	25	7	25	7
33	Brayden George	****	0	0	0	0	0	0
34	Jackson Archer	2022	3	0	26	0	26	0
35	Matt Whitlock	2025	1	0	1	0	1	0
36	River Stevens	****	0	0	0	0	0	0
37	Cooper Harvey	2023	1	1	4	2	4	2
38	Tristan Xerri	2020	16	4	72	25	72	25
39	Finnbar Maley	2025	5	3	5	3	5	3
40	Eddie Ford	2021	0	0	30	41	30	41
41	Jacob Konstanty	2025	16	10	16	10	16	10
42	Kallan Dawson	2022	3	0	19	1	19	1
43	Brynn Teakle	2022 (Port Adelaide)	0	0	11	9	17	10
44	Cameron Zurhaar	2017	16	29	137	191	137	191
45	Zac Banch	****	0	0	0	0	0	0
46	Robert Hansen Jr.	2023	9	3	17	7	17	7
47	Cooper Trembath	****	0	0	0	0	0	0

=== Squad changes ===
==== In ====
No.	Name	Position	Previous club	via
2	(Victoria (state)) Finn O'Sullivan	Defender	Oakleigh Chargers	draft
5	(South Australia) Caleb Daniel	Defender	Western Bulldogs	trade
14	(Western Australia) Luke Urquhart	Midfielder	East Fremantle	draft
26	(Victoria (state)) Luke Parker	Midfielder	Sydney	trade
28	(Western Australia) Jack Darling	Key Forward	West Coast	trade
35	(Victoria (state)) Matt Whitlock	Key Defender	Murray Bushrangers	draft
36	(Victoria (state)) River Stevens	Forward	Geelong Falcons	draft
41	(Victoria (state)) Jacob Konstanty	Forward	Sydney	trade
45	(Victoria (state)) Zac Banch	Forward	Werribee	trade
47	(Victoria (state)) Cooper Trembath	Key Defender	North Melbourne (VFL)	trade
