= 2026 North Melbourne Football Club season =

Australian rules football season

North Melbourne
2026 season
- President: Sonja Hood
- Coach: Alastair Clarkson
- Captain: Nick Larkey
- Home ground: Marvel Stadium (capacity: 53,343)
- Pre-season: 1 win, 0 losses
- AFL season: 9 wins, 14 losses
- Finals Series: DNQ
- Leading goalkicker: Nick Larkey (45)
- Highest home attendance: 45,919
- Lowest home attendance: 13,331
- Average home attendance: 30,485
- Club membership: 56,283

The 2026 North Melbourne Football Club season was the club's 102nd season of senior competition in the Australian Football League (AFL).

== Overview ==
North Melbourne 2026 season overview
Captain	Coach	Home ground	W-L-D	Ladder	Best and fairest	Leading goalkicker
Nick Larkey	Alastair Clarkson	Marvel Stadium	9-14-0	14th	TBD	Nick Larkey (45)

== Squad Changes ==
=== In ===
No.	Name	Position	Previous club	via
1	(Victoria (state)) Lachy Dovaston	Forward	Eastern Ranges	draft
13	(New South Wales) Charlie Spargo	Forward	Melbourne	trade
23	(South Australia) Blake Thredgold	Defender	Sturt	draft
28	(Victoria (state)) Hugo Mikunda	Midfielder	Geelong Falcons	draft
39	(Victoria (state)) Tom Blamires	Defender	Frankston	SSP signing

=== Out ===
No.	Name	Position	New Club	via
13	(Victoria (state)) Darcy Tucker	Defender	Carlton (VFL)	delisted
23	(Tasmania) Geordie Payne	Midfielder	Tasmania (VFL)	delisted
29	(Victoria (state)) Will Phillips	Midfielder	Collingwood Football Club (VFL)	delisted
39	(Victoria (state)) Miller Bergman	Defender	Casey Demons	delisted
39	(Victoria (state)) Finnbar Maley	Key Forward	Adelaide Football Club	trade
40	(Victoria (state)) Eddie Ford	Forward	Collingwood Football Club (VFL)	delisted
42	(Victoria (state)) Kallan Dawson	Defender	Williamstown Football Club (VFL)	delisted
43	(Victoria (state)) Brynn Teakle	Ruckman	Collingwood Football Club (VFL)	delisted

== Squad ==
North Melbourne Football Club · AFL personnel
Senior list		Rookie list	Coaching staff
1 Lachy Dovaston; 2 Finn O'Sullivan; 3 Harry Sheezel (vc); 4 Aidan Corr; 5 Caleb Daniel; 6 George Wardlaw; 7 Zane Duursma; 8 Bailey Scott; 9 Luke Davies-Uniacke; 10 Colby McKercher; 11 Luke McDonald; 12 Jy Simpkin; 13 Charlie Spargo; 14 Luke Urquhart; 15 Dylan Stephens; 16 Zac Fisher; 17 Riley Hardeman; 18 Wil Dawson; 19 Griffin Logue; 20 Nick Larkey (c)	21 Callum Coleman-Jones; 22 Taylor Goad; 23 Blake Thredgold; 24 Tom Powell; 25 Paul Curtis; 26 Luke Parker; 27 Jack Darling; 28 Hugo Mikunda; 30 Charlie Comben; 31 Josh Goater; 33 Brayden George; 34 Jackson Archer; 35 Matt Whitlock; 36 River Stevens; 37 Cooper Harvey; 38 Tristan Xerri; 41 Jacob Konstanty; 44 Cameron Zurhaar	32 Toby Pink; 39 Tom Blamires; 42 Oliver Griffin; 45 Zac Banch; 46 Robert Hansen Jr.; 47 Cooper Trembath	Head coach: Alastair Clarkson; Assistant coaches: Jed Adcock (back line); Michael Barlow (midfield); Xavier Clarke (forward line); Damian Monkhorst (ruck); Jarrod Lienert (development); Shaun Hampson (development); Darcy Macpherson (development); Legend: (c) Captain(s); (vc) Vice-captain(s); (B) Category B rookie(s); italics – Inactive; (ret) Retired; Long-term injury; Updated: 28 September 2026; Source(s): Players, coaches, injuries

== Season ==
=== Pre-season ===
North Melbourne pre-season fixture (2026)
Game	Date and local time	Opponent	Scores			Venue	Attendance	Ref
Game	Date and local time	Opponent	Home	Away	Result	Venue	Attendance	Ref
Community Series	Sunday, 1 March (3:10 pm)	Collingwood Magpies	**12.18 (90)**	14.5 (89)	Won by 1 point	Mars Stadium	3,464	

=== Home and away season ===
North Melbourne home and away season fixture (2026)
Round	Date and local time	Opponent	Scores (bold indicates North Melbourne score)			Venue (home/away)	Attendance	Ladder position	Ref
Round	Date and local time	Opponent	Home	Away	Result	Venue (home/away)	Attendance	Ladder position	Ref
1	Sunday, 15 March (1:10 pm)	Port Adelaide Power	**17.11 (113)**	9.13 (67)	Won by 46 points	Marvel Stadium (home)	23,318	4th	
2	Sunday, 22 March (3:10 pm)	West Coast Eagles	17.9 (111)	**15.4 (94)**	Lost by 17 points	Optus Stadium (away)	47,083	6th	
3	Saturday, 28 March (7:35 pm)	Essendon Bombers	9.15 (69)	**12.9 (81)**	Won by 12 points	Marvel Stadium (away)	40,154	6th	
4	Friday, 3 April (3:15 pm)	Carlton Blues	**14.12 (96)**	13.8 (86)	Won by 10 points	Marvel Stadium (home)	45,919	5th	
5	Saturday, 11 April (12:05 pm)	Brisbane Lions	**9.12 (66)**	13.14 (92)	Lost by 26 points	Barossa Park (home)	10,613	7th	
6	Sunday, 19 April (1:10 pm)	Richmond Tigers	**20.10 (130)**	7.13 (55)	Won by 75 points	Marvel Stadium (home)	36,584	5th	
7	Sunday, 26 April (4:40 pm)	GWS Giants	15.15 (105)	**14.14 (98)**	Lost by 7 points	Corroboree Group Oval (away)	12,597	6th	
8	Saturday, 2 May (4:35 pm)	Geelong Cats	21.9 (135)	**13.8 (86)**	Lost by 49 points	GMHBA Stadium (away)	32,485	10th	
9	Saturday, 9 May (12:35 pm)	Sydney Swans	**14.13 (97)**	16.9 (105)	Lost by 8 points	Marvel Stadium (home)	28,156	12th	
10	Saturday, 16 May (12:45 pm)	Adelaide Crows	20.13 (133)	**9.11 (65)**	Lost by 68 points	Adelaide Oval (away)	41,313	12th	
11	Saturday, 23 May (1:15 pm)	Gold Coast Suns	**17.9 (111)**	16.9 (105)	Won by 6 points	Marvel Stadium (home)	16,260	13th	
12	Bye								
13	Saturday, 6 June (12:15 pm)	Fremantle Dockers	**4.7 (31)**	24.11 (155)	Lost by 124 points	Hands Oval (home)	13,331	14th	
14	Saturday, 13 June (2:15 pm)	West Coast Eagles	**10.14 (74)**	10.13 (73)	Won by 1 point	Optus Stadium (home)	42,409	12th	
15	Sunday, 21 June (1:10 pm)	Richmond Tigers	6.12 (48)	**10.13 (73)**	Won by 25 points	Melbourne Cricket Ground (away)	41,806	10th	
16	Sunday, 28 June (3:15 pm)	Essendon Bombers	**10.19 (79)**	9.11 (65)	Won by 14 points	Marvel Stadium (home)	37,054	9th	
17	Sunday, 5 July (4:10 pm)	Port Adelaide Power	10.13 (73)	**7.10 (52)**	Lost by 21 points	Adelaide Oval (away)	33,105	11th	
18	Friday, 10 July (7:40 pm)	Collingwood Magpies	13.11 (89)	**12.13 (85)**	Lost by 4 points	Marvel Stadium (away)	48,369	13th	
19	Saturday, 18 July (4:15 pm)	Melbourne Demons	**11.10 (76)**	13.14 (92)	Lost by 16 points	Marvel Stadium (home)	25,025	13th	
20	Sunday, 26 July (3:15 pm)	St Kilda Saints	**8.14 (62)**	13.15 (93)	Lost by 31 points	Marvel Stadium (home)	25,523	13th	
21	Saturday, 1 August (1:35 pm)	Hawthorn Hawks	14.15 (99)	**12.11 (83)**	Lost by 16 points	University of Tasmania Stadium (away)	9,420	13th	
22	Thursday, 6 August (7:30 pm)	Western Bulldogs	11.11 (77)	**15.10 (100)**	Won by 23 points	Marvel Stadium (away)	25,052	13th	
23	Saturday, 15 August (3:45 pm)	Geelong Cats	**17.8 (110)**	19.11 (125)	Lost by 15 points	Marvel Stadium (home)	35,529	13th	
24	Sunday, 23 August (3:20 pm)	Sydney Swans	17.21 (123)	**10.10 (70)**	Lost by 53 points	Sydney Cricket Ground (away)	30,058	14th	

== Statistics ==
Players are listed by guernsey number. Players who did not appear in the 2026 AFL season are not listed.

Bold indicates a player led their club in that statistic.

Statistics are correct as of September 28, 2026 and are taken from AFL Tables, some pages with the individual players stats were also used.

Legend
G	Goals	K	Kicks	D	Disposals	T	Tackles
B	Behinds	H	Handballs	M	Marks	H/O	Hit-outs

Number	Name	Games	Brownlow votes	Totals								Averages (per game)							
Number	Name	Games	Brownlow votes	K	M	H	D	G	B	H/O	T	K	M	H	D	G	B	H/O	T
1	Lachy Dovaston	6	0	29	15	20	49	3	4	0	10	4.83	2.50	3.33	8.17	0.50	0.67	0.00	1.67
2	Finn O'Sullivan	19	0	179	75	197	376	5	6	0	56	9.42	3.95	10.37	19.79	0.26	0.32	0.00	2.95
3	Harry Sheezel	22	**27**	325	144	**345**	**670**	12	12	0	107	14.77	**6.55**	**15.68**	**30.45**	0.55	0.55	0.00	4.86
4	Aidan Corr	16	0	124	61	71	195	0	0	0	17	7.75	3.81	4.44	12.19	0.00	0.00	0.00	1.06
5	Caleb Daniel	**23**	0	351	121	231	582	0	1	0	46	15.26	5.26	10.04	25.30	0.00	0.04	0.00	2.00
6	George Wardlaw	16	0	146	39	126	272	6	2	0	86	9.13	2.44	7.88	17.00	0.38	0.13	0.00	5.38
7	Zane Duursma	15	0	64	43	35	99	15	12	0	14	4.27	2.87	2.33	6.60	1.00	0.80	0.00	0.93
8	Bailey Scott	3	0	16	11	19	35	0	1	0	8	5.33	3.67	6.33	11.67	0.00	0.33	0.00	2.67
9	Luke Davies-Uniacke	**23**	19	269	85	299	568	7	5	0	111	11.70	3.70	13.00	24.70	0.30	0.22	0.00	4.83
10	Colby McKercher	**23**	2	311	80	188	499	6	5	0	52	13.52	3.48	8.17	21.70	0.26	0.22	0.00	2.26
11	Luke McDonald	18	0	184	99	104	288	1	1	0	35	10.22	5.50	5.78	16.00	0.06	0.06	0.00	1.94
12	Jy Simpkin	**23**	2	287	118	220	507	13	11	0	49	12.48	5.13	9.57	22.04	0.57	0.48	0.00	2.13
13	Charlie Spargo	19	0	125	75	117	242	12	5	0	39	6.58	3.95	6.16	12.74	0.63	0.26	0.00	2.05
15	Dylan Stephens	**23**	2	278	117	180	458	4	10	0	39	12.09	5.09	7.83	19.91	0.17	0.43	0.00	1.70
16	Zac Fisher	1	0	8	3	6	14	0	0	0	2	8.00	3.00	6.00	14.00	0.00	0.00	0.00	2.00
17	Riley Hardeman	7	0	62	23	31	93	1	0	0	10	8.86	3.29	4.43	13.29	0.14	0.00	0.00	1.43
18	Wil Dawson	10	0	29	18	29	58	0	3	88	27	2.90	1.80	2.90	5.80	0.00	0.30	8.80	2.70
19	Griffin Logue	16	0	94	75	92	186	0	0	0	16	5.88	4.69	5.75	11.63	0.00	0.00	0.00	1.00
20	Nick Larkey	**23**	1	150	111	80	230	**45**	**28**	0	25	6.52	4.83	3.48	10.00	**1.96**	**1.22**	0.00	1.09
21	Callum Coleman-Jones	5	0	21	7	25	46	0	0	52	7	4.20	1.40	5.00	9.20	0.00	0.00	10.40	1.40
22	Taylor Goad	2	0	4	0	3	7	0	0	26	6	2.00	0.00	1.50	3.50	0.00	0.00	13.00	3.00
24	Tom Powell	8	0	81	40	53	134	3	6	0	22	10.13	5.00	6.63	16.75	0.38	0.75	0.00	2.75
25	Paul Curtis	20	2	161	78	87	248	38	22	0	71	8.05	3.90	4.35	12.40	1.90	1.10	0.00	3.55
26	Luke Parker	**23**	6	**364**	**150**	218	582	3	0	0	44	**15.83**	6.52	9.48	25.30	0.13	0.00	0.00	1.91
27	Jack Darling	22	1	143	96	88	231	36	13	20	50	6.50	4.36	4.00	10.50	1.64	0.59	0.91	2.27
30	Charlie Comben	22	0	161	125	101	262	1	0	0	46	7.32	5.68	4.59	11.91	0.05	0.00	0.00	2.09
31	Josh Goater	6	0	46	29	46	92	0	2	0	5	7.67	4.83	7.67	15.33	0.00	0.33	0.00	0.83
32	Toby Pink	5	0	38	25	23	61	0	0	0	4	7.60	5.00	4.60	12.20	0.00	0.00	0.00	0.80
35	Matt Whitlock	3	0	12	9	7	19	2	2	0	1	4.00	3.00	2.33	6.33	0.67	0.67	0.00	0.33
37	Cooper Harvey	7	0	82	39	56	138	0	0	0	11	11.71	5.57	8.00	19.71	0.00	0.00	0.00	1.57
38	Tristan Xerri	19	3	129	55	208	337	8	5	**405**	**113**	6.79	2.89	10.95	17.74	0.42	0.26	**21.32**	**5.95**
39	Tom Blamires	17	0	169	53	124	293	3	4	0	29	9.94	3.12	7.29	17.24	0.18	0.24	0.00	1.71
41	Jacob Konstanty	10	0	43	25	52	95	7	4	0	23	4.30	2.50	5.20	9.50	0.70	0.40	0.00	2.30
44	Cameron Zurhaar	**23**	0	232	131	121	353	10	12	0	39	10.09	5.70	5.26	15.35	0.43	0.52	0.00	1.70
45	Zac Banch	8	0	47	24	33	80	7	9	0	18	5.88	3.00	4.13	10.00	0.88	1.13	0.00	2.25
47	Cooper Trembath	**23**	2	131	103	98	229	32	10	119	49	5.70	4.48	4.26	9.96	1.39	0.43	5.17	2.13

=== Ladder ===
Pos	Team	Pld	W	L	D	PF	PA	PP	Pts	Qualification
1	Fremantle	23	19	4	0	2286	1666	137.2	76	Finals series
2	Sydney	23	18	5	0	2543	1869	136.1	72	Finals series
3	Brisbane Lions (P)	23	16	7	0	2499	2054	121.7	64	Finals series
4	Hawthorn	23	15	6	2	2260	1881	120.1	64	Finals series
5	Geelong	23	15	8	0	2355	1925	122.3	60	Finals series
6	Adelaide	23	15	8	0	2169	1849	117.3	60	Finals series
7	Melbourne	23	15	8	0	2301	2099	109.6	60	Finals series
8	Western Bulldogs	23	13	9	1	1901	1992	95.4	54	Finals series
9	Collingwood	23	12	9	2	2021	1974	102.4	52	Finals series
10	Carlton	23	12	10	1	2007	1978	101.5	50	Finals series
11	St Kilda	23	10	13	0	2030	1974	102.8	40	
12	Greater Western Sydney	23	10	13	0	2073	2095	98.9	40	
13	Gold Coast	23	9	14	0	2011	2128	94.5	36	
**14**	North Melbourne	**23**	**9**	**14**	**0**	**1932**	**2175**	**88.8**	36	
15	Port Adelaide	23	7	16	0	1804	2048	88.1	28	
16	West Coast	23	4	19	0	1615	2333	69.2	16	
17	Richmond	23	3	20	0	1483	2373	62.5	12	
18	Essendon	23	2	21	0	1601	2478	64.6	8	

Source: afl.com.au
Rules for classification: 1) points; 2) percentage; 3) number of points for
(P) Premiers

== Goalkickers ==
Name	Games	Goals	Average
Nick Larkey	23	45	1.96
Paul Curtis	20	38	1.90
Jack Darling	22	36	1.64
Cooper Trembath	23	32	1.39
Zane Duursma	15	15	1.00
Jy Simpkin	23	13	0.57
Harry Sheezel	22	12	0.55
Charlie Spargo	19	12	0.63
Cameron Zurhaar	23	10	0.43
Tristan Xerri	19	8	0.42
Luke Davies-Uniacke	23	7	0.30
Jacob Konstanty	10	7	0.70
Zac Banch	8	7	0.88
George Wardlaw	16	6	0.38
Colby McKercher	23	6	0.26
Finn O'Sullivan	19	5	0.26
Dylan Stephens	23	4	0.17
Lachy Dovaston	6	3	0.50
Tom Powell	8	3	0.38
Luke Parker	23	3	0.13
Tom Blamires	17	3	0.18
Matt Whitlock	3	2	0.67
Luke McDonald	18	1	0.06
Riley Hardeman	7	1	0.14
Charlie Comben	22	1	0.05

== Milestones ==
=== Round 1 ===
- Alastair Clarkson - 450th coached AFL game
- Lachy Dovaston - AFL debut
- Tom Blamires - AFL debut

=== Round 2 ===
- Charlie Comben - 50th AFL game
- Paul Curtis - 100th AFL goal

=== Round 5 ===
- Charlie Spargo - North Melbourne debut
- Griffin Logue - 100th AFL game

=== Round 6 ===
- Luke Davies-Uniacke - 50th AFL goal
- Charlie Spargo - 1st goal at North Melbourne

=== Round 7 ===
- Cameron Zurhaar - 150th AFL game

=== Round 8 ===
- Nick Larkey - 300th AFL goal

=== Round 11 ===
- Club - Greatest comeback since 1947
- Colby McKercher - 50th AFL game
- Cameron Zurhaar - Goal after the siren to win

=== Round 14 ===
- Taylor Goad - AFL debut

=== Round 15 ===
- George Wardlaw - 50th AFL game

=== Round 17 ===
- Match - Most free kicks in an AFL game since 2008
- Nick Larkey - 150th AFL game

=== Round 18 ===
- Alastair Clarkson - 600th combined AFL game (as a senior player and coach)
- Riley Hardeman - 1st AFL goal

=== Round 20 ===
- Dylan Stephens - 100th AFL game

=== Round 21 ===
- Luke Davies-Uniacke - 150th AFL game

=== Round 22 ===
- Alastair Clarkson - 20th win coaching North Melbourne
