= Goater (surname) =

Goater is a surname. Notable people with the surname include:

- Josh Goater (born 2003), Australian rules footballer
- Julian Goater (born 1953), British former long-distance runner
- Shaun Goater (born 1970), Bermudian footballer, coach, and pundit
