= Red Cliffs Secondary College =

High school in Red Cliffs, Victoria, Australia

Location
- 55 Fitzroy Avenue; Red Cliffs, Victoria, 1295; Australia
- 34°17′57″S 142°11′44″E

Information
- Other name: RCSC
- Former name: Red Cliffs High School
- Type: Public high school
- Motto: Resilient, Compassionate, Successful, Citizens
- Principal: Justin Matt
- Teaching staff: 45
- Years offered: 7–12
- Gender: Co-educational
- Enrolment: 428 (2022)
- Houses: Allungah; Bindaree; Terragong; Warragai
- Colours: Maroon and white Navy blue and white
- Website: www.red-cliffs-sc.vic.edu.au

Red Cliffs Secondary College (RCSC) is a public co-educational high school in Red Cliffs, Victoria, Australia. It is the only Victorian state government run school in the Mildura District that offers a continuous education from year 7 through to year 12.

The initials of the school's motto "Resilient, Compassionate, Successful, Citizens" matches that of its name.

== Facilities ==
The school received a significant upgrade between Q4 2017 and Q2 2019, where the food and textiles classrooms, administration area, staff rooms and cafeteria were demolished and replaced by two buildings, one containing the school's office and staff facilities, while the other contains a new cafeteria, two cooking classrooms, lecture theatre, year 12 study room and four new classrooms. The project also included refurbishments to the toilets, maths hub, library, performing arts centre and a brand-new covered locker area.

== House system ==
The school has a house system of four houses. Students are assigned to a house and those with siblings who also attend the school are placed in the same house. Students participate in a number of sports events throughout the year, including the Swimming Carnival, Cross Country and Athletics Day. Points are awarded to each house based on its participation rate. The houses are:

- Allungah (yellow)
- Bindaree (blue)
- Terragong (green)
- Warragai (red)

== Principals ==
- AM Cracknell (1961−1963)
- GG Sloane (1964−1966)
- J Fletcher (1967−1968)
- JA Mitchell (1969−1972)
- E Borschmann (1973−1980)
- E Warhurst (1981−1992)
- (D Currie acting Principal in 1993)
- G Roberts (1994−1995)
- (M Jackman acting Principal in 1996)
- J Cortese (1997−2008)
- DG Browne (2009−2022)
- D Mitchell (Acting Principal in 2022)
- B Vallance (Acting Principal in 2022 and early 2023)
- J Matt (2023–present)

== Notable alumni ==
- Myf Warhurst, TV and radio personality
- Simon Leach, Musician in Little Birdy
- Kit Warhurst, musician
- Jenny Bannister, fashion designer
- Arron Wood, environmental activist
- Dylan Stephens, AFL footballer
