= Jackson Archer =

Australian rules football player

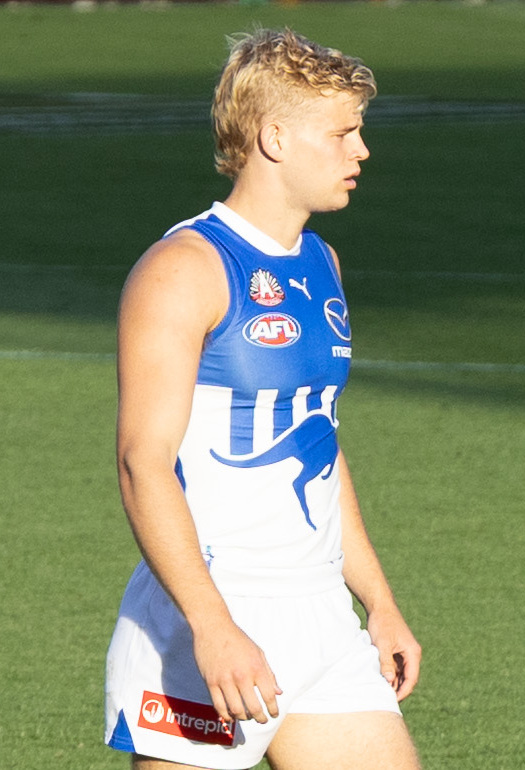
- Archer in April 2025

Personal information
- Born: 9 January 2003 (age 23)
- Original teams: Northern Knights (NAB League); Park Orchards Football Club(YJFL)
- Draft: No. 59, 2021 national draft
- Debut: Round 15, 2022, North Melbourne vs. Adelaide, at Bellerive Oval, Tasmania
- Height: 185 cm (6 ft 1 in)
- Weight: 75 kg (165 lb)
- Position: Midfielder

Club information
- Current club: North Melbourne
- Number: 34

Playing career^{1}
Years	Club	Games (Goals)
2022–	North Melbourne	26 (0)
- ^{1} Playing statistics correct to the end of the 2025 season.

Career highlights
- AFL Rising Star nominee 2024

Jackson Archer is an Australian rules footballer who plays for North Melbourne Football Club in the Australian Football League (AFL).

== Early life ==
Archer played junior football with the Park Orchards Sharks in the Yarra Junior Football League. He attended secondary school at Whitefriars College in Donvale. In 2021, he played 9 games for the Northern Knights in the NAB League. In the same year, he represented North Melbourne's VFL side in two outings against Port Melbourne and the Southport Sharks. As a junior, Archer was known for his courage, aggression, and competitiveness.

As the son of Glenn, Archer was eligible as a father–son pick for North Melbourne, and he lodged his nomination on the 28th of October 2021.

== AFL career ==
At the 2021 AFL draft, Archer was not bid upon by any other club, being eventually selected by North Melbourne with pick 59. Archer made his debut at Bellerive Oval against Adelaide in round 15 of the 2022 season. Archer would feature twice more for the senior side in 2022 before being sidelined with a hip issue.

In March 2023, Archer penned a one-year contract extension after an impressive pre-season. Due to a groin injury, he did not feature at senior level until Round 19 against Hawthorn. In July 2024, Archer has signed another contract extension, continuing his career till the end of 2026, after making himself a regular in the Kangaroos' backline in 2024, playing with great determination and an uncompromising attack on the footy, and he's proving to be a tough opponent at senior level.

Archer was nominated for the AFL Rising Star award after he had put together a strong run of form and impressed in the Kangaroos' 13-point win over Richmond in round 21, 2024. Archer had 20 disposals, eight marks and five tackles in the victory.

== Statistics ==
Updated to the end of the 2026 season.

Legend
G	Goals	K	Kicks	D	Disposals	T	Tackles
B	Behinds	H	Handballs	M	Marks

Season	Team	No.	Games	Totals							Averages (per game)							Votes
Season	Team	No.	Games	G	B	K	H	D	M	T	G	B	K	H	D	M	T	Votes
2022	North Melbourne	34	3	0	0	12	21	33	6	10	0.0	0.0	4.0	7.0	11.0	2.0	3.3	0
2023	North Melbourne	34	5	0	0	24	18	42	12	8	0.0	0.0	4.8	3.6	8.4	2.4	1.6	0
2024	North Melbourne	34	15	0	0	82	66	148	50	38	0.0	0.0	5.5	4.4	9.9	3.3	2.5	0
2025	North Melbourne	34	3	0	0	13	11	24	3	3	0.0	0.0	4.3	3.7	8.0	1.0	1.0	0
2026	North Melbourne	34	Did not play due to an anterior cruciate ligament (ACL) injury sustained in pre-season.															
Career			26	0	0	131	116	247	71	59	0.0	0.0	5.0	4.5	9.5	2.7	2.3	0
