= Will Phillips (footballer) =

Australian rules footballer (born 2002)

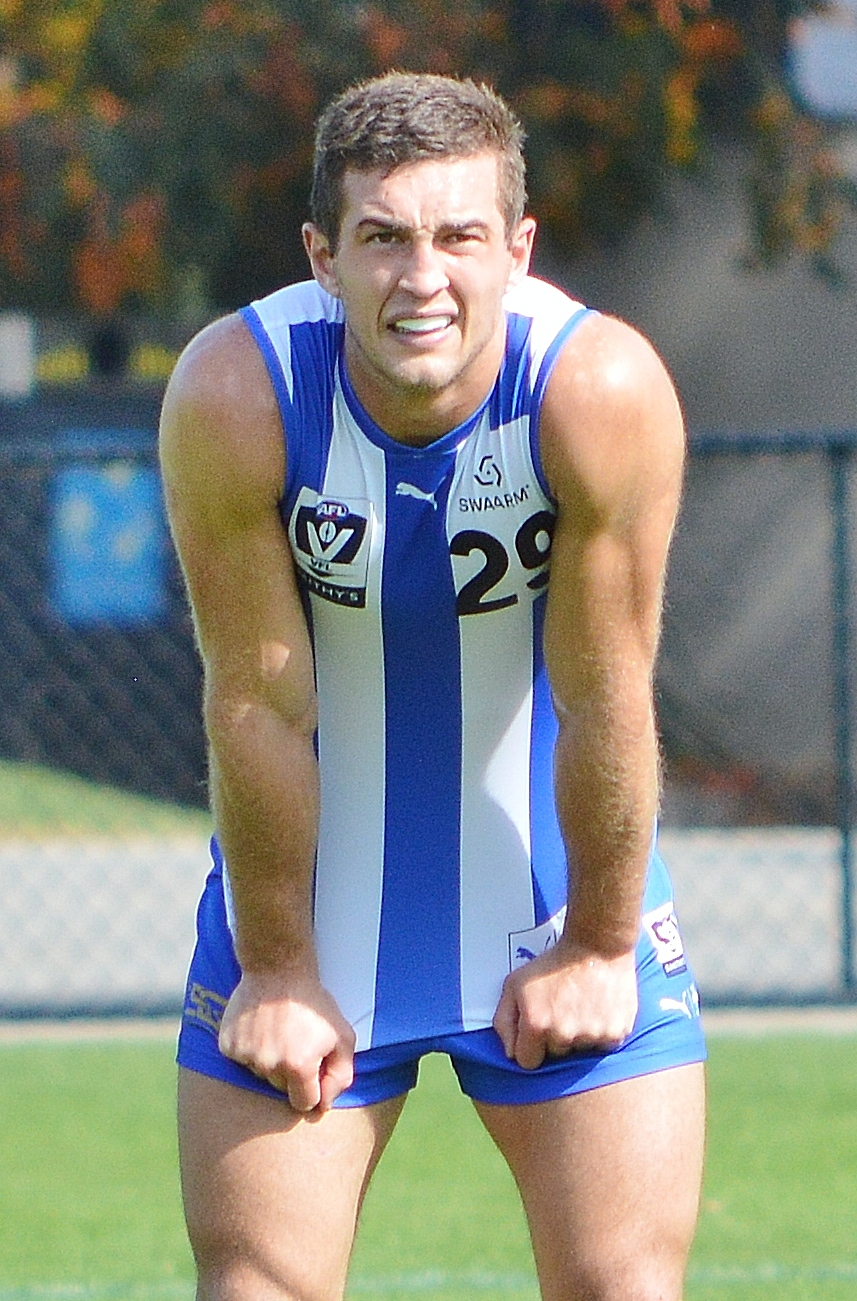
- Phillips with North Melbourne's VFL side in April 2025

Personal information
- Full name: William Phillips
- Born: 22 May 2002 (age 24)
- Original team: Oakleigh Chargers (NAB League)/Caulfield Grammar
- Draft: No. 3, 2020 AFL draft, North Melbourne
- Debut: 2 April 2021, North Melbourne vs. Western Bulldogs, at Docklands Stadium
- Height: 180 cm (5 ft 11 in)
- Weight: 80 kg (176 lb)
- Position: Midfielder

Playing career
Years	Club	Games (Goals)
2021–2025	North Melbourne	50 (8)

Will Phillips (born 22 May 2002) is an Australian rules footballer who plays for the Collingwood Football Club in the Victorian Football League (VFL). He previously played professionally for North Melbourne in the Australian Football League (AFL) after being recruited with the 3rd pick in the 2020 AFL draft.

== Early football ==
Phillips began his junior career in Doncaster East playing for the Beverley Hills Football Club in the Yarra Junior Football League, where he played over 100 games from the Auskick to the Under 15s division. He played school football for his school, Caulfield Grammar School, and was named as a co-captain of the school in his senior year. 2018 saw Phillips take out the most valuable player award in the AFL Under 16 championships. Phillips played for the Oakleigh Chargers in the NAB League in 2018 and 2019, playing a total of 15 games over the two seasons. He averaged 22 disposals in his 2019 season, and played a vital part in their grand final win, kicking 2 goals.

== AFL career ==
Phillips debuted for North Melbourne in the team's loss to the Western Bulldogs in the 3rd round of the 2021 AFL season. On debut, Phillips was relatively quiet, collecting 9 disposals, 2 marks and 2 tackles.

Phillips did not play at AFL level in 2022 due to glandular fever, and only managed 3 VFL games.

Phillips returned in the 1st round of the 2023 season as the substitute in North Melbourne's win over West Coast, coming on to the field in the 1st quarter to replace ruckman Tristan Xerri. In round 3, Phillips was selected in the starting team for his first full game of the season. In an appearance on the Sunday Footy Show in April, Phillips commented on the booing of former teammate Jason Horne-Francis by AFL fans, stating "it's probably unfair for other teams to do that, but understandable for North Melbourne fans". He polled AFL Coaches' Association Champion Player of the Year Award for his 27 disposal, 8 clearance game against Essendon in Round 12, and ultimately played 16 games for the year.

Phillips was delisted by North Melbourne at the end of the 2025 AFL season, having played 50 games over his 5 seasons at the club.

== Statistics ==
Legend
G	Goals	K	Kicks	D	Disposals	T	Tackles
B	Behinds	H	Handballs	M	Marks

Season	Team	No.	Games	Totals							Averages (per game)							Votes
Season	Team	No.	Games	G	B	K	H	D	M	T	G	B	K	H	D	M	T	Votes
2021	North Melbourne	29	16	3	4	71	81	152	31	33	0.2	0.3	4.4	5.1	9.5	1.9	2.1	0
2022	North Melbourne	29	0	—	—	—	—	—	—	—	—	—	—	—	—	—	—	0
2023	North Melbourne	29	16	3	2	113	188	301	28	66	0.2	0.1	7.1	11.8	18.8	1.8	4.1	1
2024	North Melbourne	29	11	2	0	58	96	154	22	55	0.2	0.0	5.3	8.7	14.0	2.0	5.0	0
2025	North Melbourne	29	7	0	1	36	65	101	17	35	0.0	0.1	5.1	9.3	14.4	2.4	5.0	0
Career			50	8	7	278	430	708	98	189	0.2	0.1	5.6	8.6	14.2	2.0	3.8	1
