= Lachy Dovaston =

Australian rules footballer (born 2007)

Personal information
- Born: 29 May 2007 (age 19)
- Original team: Blackburn
- Draft: No. 16, 2025 national draft
- Height: 178 cm (5 ft 10 in)
- Position: Forward

Club information
- Current club: North Melbourne
- Number: 1

Playing career
Years	Club	Games (Goals)
2026–	North Melbourne	6 (3)

Lachy Dovaston (born 29 May 2007) is an Australian rules footballer who plays for North Melbourne in the Australian Football League (AFL).

Dovaston attended Rowville Sports Academy in Melbourne and is a cousin of Collingwood premiership player Nathan Murphy. He was a Blackburn junior.

A small forward, Dovaston kicked 38 goals for Eastern Ranges during their premiership-winning Talent League season in 2025, gaining selection in the "Team of the Year". This was followed by a strong performance with Vic Metro at the AFL National Championships, where he averaged two goals and 13 disposals a game to earn All-Australian honours. He ran the best time for the agility test (7.794 seconds) at the AFL Draft Combine, the fourth fastest of all time, and was widely considered to be the best small forward to enter the subsequent draft.

Dovaston was selected by North Melbourne with pick 16 in the 2025 national draft. During the 2026 AFL season, Dovaston played six games for North Melbourne, debuting in their round one win over Port Adelaide at Docklands.
