= Paul Curtis (footballer) =

Australian rules footballer

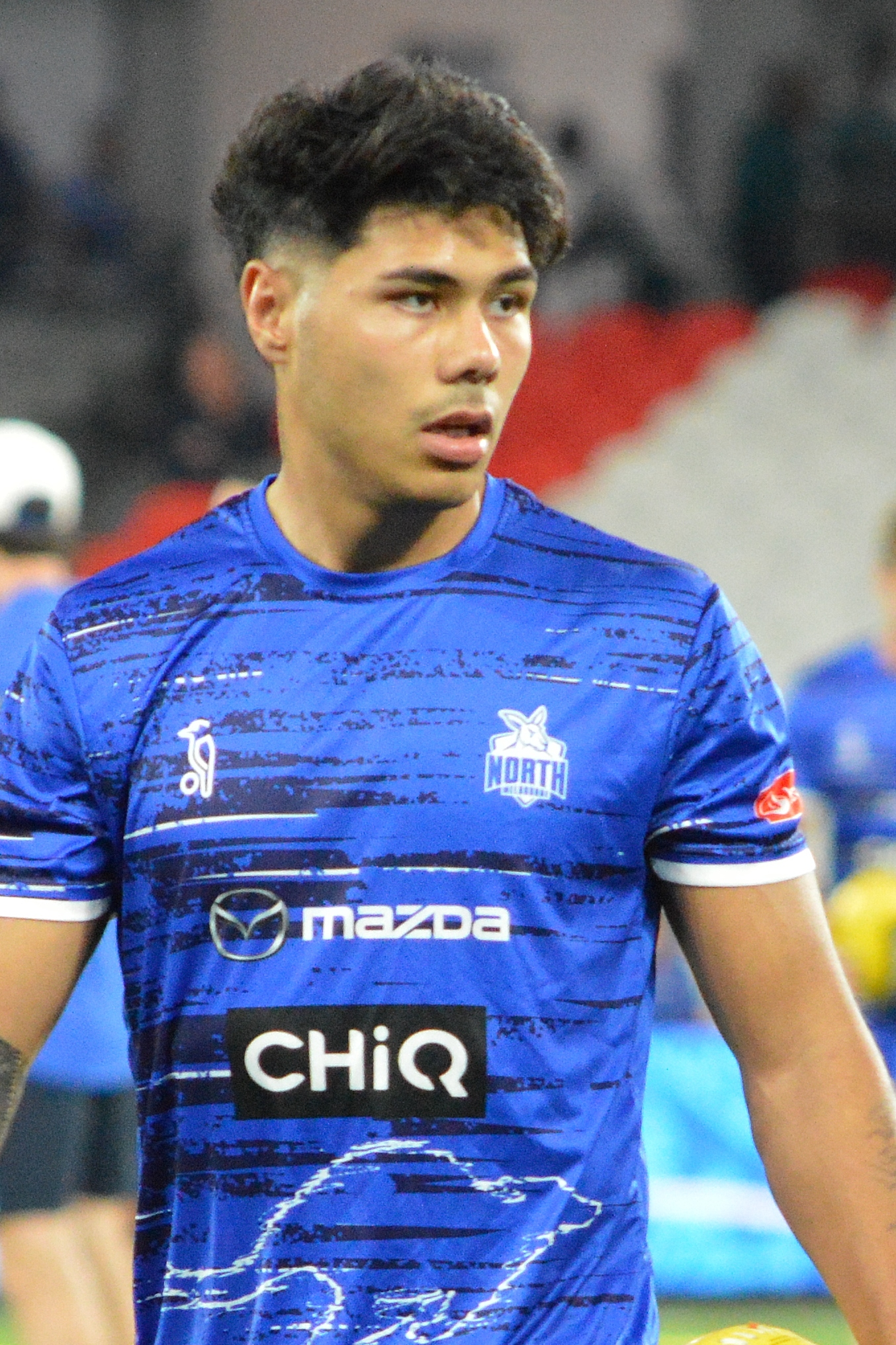
- Curtis in March 2026

Personal information
- Born: 3 March 2003 (age 23)
- Original team: Western Jets
- Draft: No. 35, 2021 national draft
- Debut: 24 April 2022, North Melbourne vs. Geelong, at Blundstone Arena
- Height: 185 cm (6 ft 1 in)
- Weight: 75 kg (165 lb)
- Position: Forward

Club information
- Current club: North Melbourne
- Number: 25

Playing career^{1}
Years	Club	Games (Goals)
2022–	North Melbourne	98 (135)
- ^{1} Playing statistics correct to the end of the 2026 season.

Paul Curtis (born 4 March 2003) is an Australian rules footballer who plays for North Melbourne Football Club in the Australian Football League (AFL).

== Early life ==
Curtis was raised in Melton, Victoria, by a mother who represented Tonga in netball at the Commonwealth Games. He attended Maribyrnong College as part of their selective sports academy and played for the Western Jets in the NAB League as a small forward where he stood out catching the interest of recruiters from multiple AFL clubs. However prior to the draft, Curtis contracted COVID-19, resulting in his planned interviews with several clubs being placed on hold. He was drafted by North Melbourne Football Club with 35th selection in the 2021 National Draft.

== AFL career ==
Curtis made his debut for North Melbourne in their 60-point loss to Geelong in Round 6, 2022. He had 11 disposals and kicked his first goal in the last quarter. In Round 18, 2022, Curtis kicked a career-high 3 goals and had 14 disposals in an upset win against the Tigers at Marvel Stadium.

== Statistics ==
Updated to the end of round 22, 2026.

Legend
G	Goals	K	Kicks	D	Disposals	T	Tackles
B	Behinds	H	Handballs	M	Marks

Season	Team	No.	Games	Totals							Averages (per game)							Votes
Season	Team	No.	Games	G	B	K	H	D	M	T	G	B	K	H	D	M	T	Votes
2022	North Melbourne	25	15	12	8	94	50	144	55	43	0.8	0.5	6.3	3.3	9.6	3.7	2.9	0
2023	North Melbourne	25	21	17	14	124	75	199	54	49	0.8	0.7	5.9	3.6	9.5	2.6	2.3	0
2024	North Melbourne	25	23	30	21	157	103	260	82	68	1.3	0.9	6.8	4.5	11.3	3.6	3.0	0
2025	North Melbourne	25	19	38	15	150	73	223	75	85	2.0	0.8	7.9	3.8	11.7	3.9	4.5	0
2026	North Melbourne	25	18	36	21	149	81	230	72	63	2.0	1.2	8.3	4.5	12.8	4.0	3.5	0
Career			96	133	79	674	382	1056	338	308	1.4	0.8	7.0	4.0	11.0	3.5	3.2	0
