= Zac Banch =

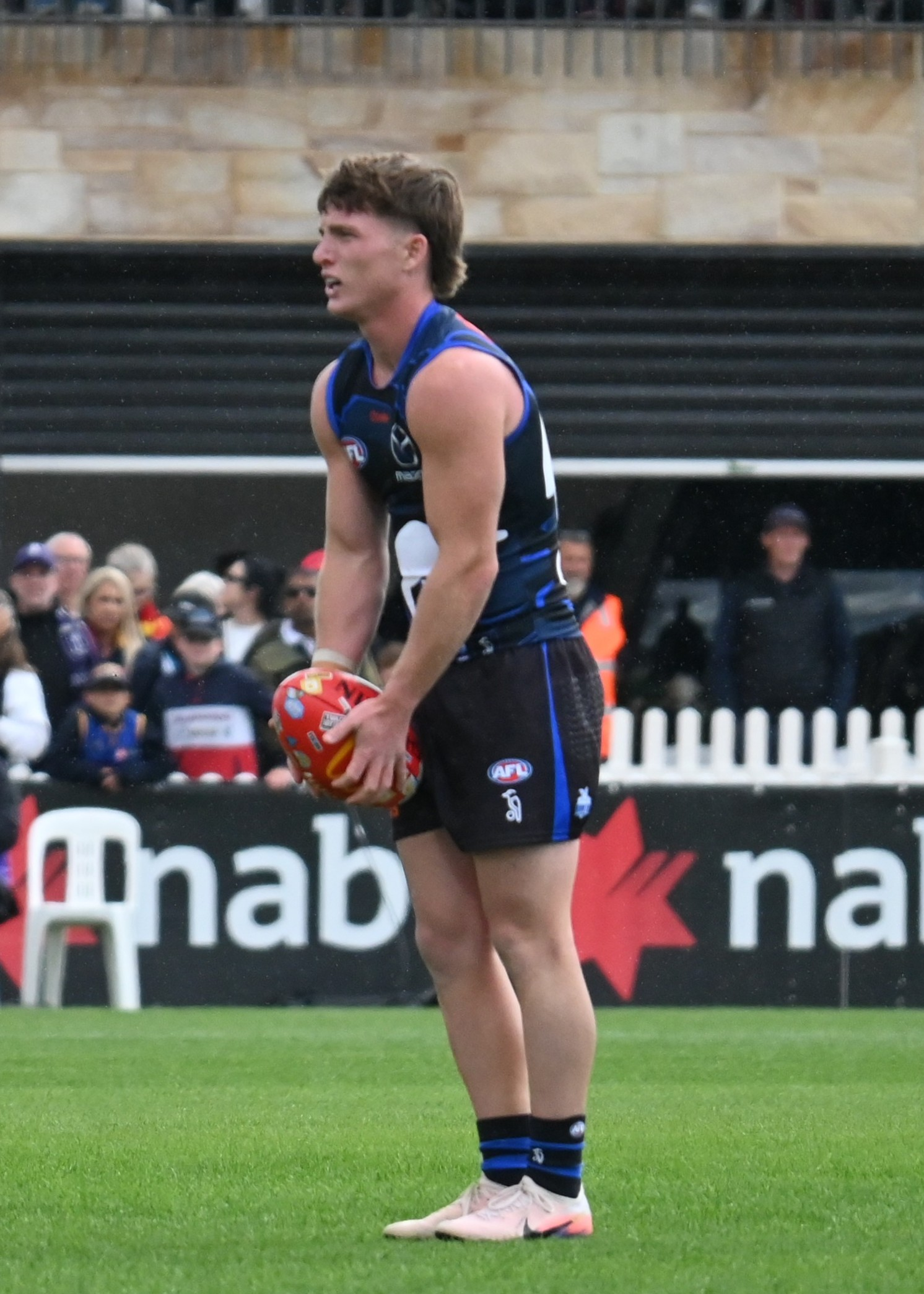
- Banch in April 2026

Personal information
- Born: 21 January 2003 (age 23)
- Original team: Williamstown/Werribee
- Draft: No. 2, 2025 mid-season rookie draft
- Debut: Round 19, 2025, North Melbourne vs. Sydney, at the Sydney Cricket Ground
- Height: 173 cm (5 ft 8 in)
- Position: Forward

Club information
- Current club: North Melbourne
- Number: 45

Playing career^{1}
Years	Club	Games (Goals)
2025–	North Melbourne	12 (8)
- ^{1} Playing statistics correct to the end of the 2026 season.

Career highlights
- VFL premiership player: 2024

Zac Banch (born 21 January 2003) is a professional Australian rules footballer who plays for the North Melbourne Football Club in the Australian Football League (AFL).

== VFL career ==
Banch first played VFL with Williamstown in 2023, making the move to Werribee in 2024. He played 15 games for Werribee in 2024, and was a part of their 2024 premiership side.

== AFL career ==
Banch was selected with pick 2 of the 2025 mid-season rookie draft. He made his debut against the Sydney Swans in round 19 of the 2025 AFL season.

== Statistics ==
Updated to the end of the 2026 season.

Legend
G	Goals	K	Kicks	D	Disposals	T	Tackles
B	Behinds	H	Handballs	M	Marks

Season	Team	No.	Games	Totals							Averages (per game)							Votes
Season	Team	No.	Games	G	B	K	H	D	M	T	G	B	K	H	D	M	T	Votes
2025	North Melbourne	45	4	1	1	15	12	27	12	3	0.3	0.3	3.8	3.0	6.8	3.0	0.8	0
2026	North Melbourne	45	8	7	9	47	33	80	24	18	0.9	1.1	5.9	4.1	10.0	3.0	2.3	0
Career			12	8	10	62	45	107	36	21	0.7	0.8	5.2	3.8	8.9	3.0	1.8	0
