= Charlie Comben =

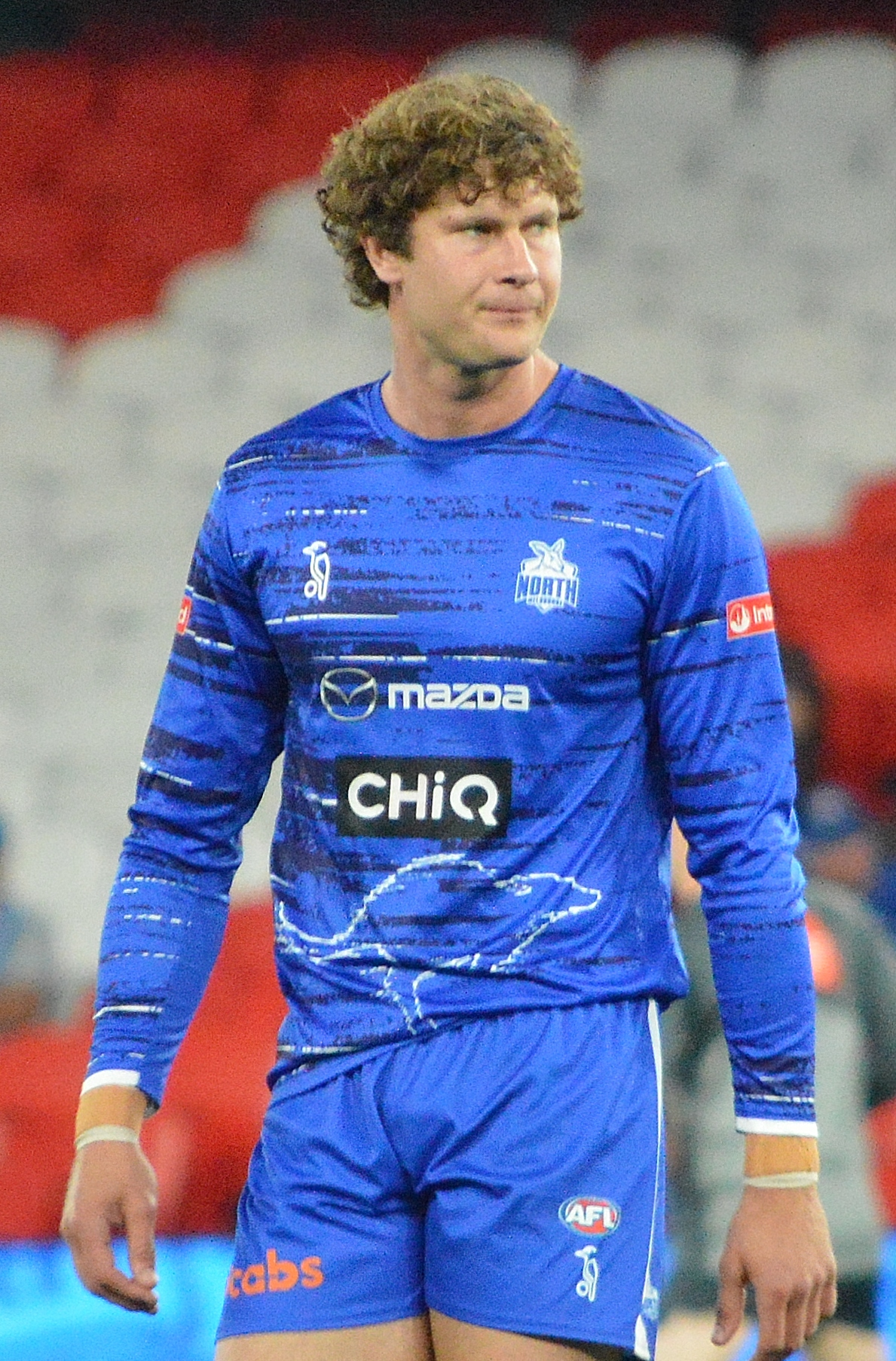
- Comben in March 2026

Personal information
- Born: 20 July 2001 (age 25)
- Original team: Gippsland Power
- Draft: No. 31, 2019 national draft
- Debut: 14 August 2021, North Melbourne vs. Sydney, at Marvel Stadium
- Height: 199 cm (6 ft 6 in)
- Weight: 94 kg (207 lb)
- Position: Key defender

Club information
- Current club: North Melbourne
- Number: 30

Playing career^{1}
Years	Club	Games (Goals)
2020–	North Melbourne	68 (9)
- ^{1} Playing statistics correct to the end of round 22, 2026.

Charlie Comben (born 20 July 2001) is an Australian rules footballer who plays for North Melbourne Football Club in the Australian Football League (AFL).

== Early life ==
Comben's junior football was hindered by a series of injuries. At age 15, Comben played only 8 games before breaking his wrist. On return later in the season, he broke his collarbone. At age 16, Comben broke his inner cheekbone in three places, requiring surgery to repair. This injury sidelined him for over half the season. In 2018, Comben fell awkwardly while playing high school basketball, breaking his tibia and fracturing and dislocating his knee cap. On return, he dislocated his knee cap again, requiring surgery.

Nevertheless, he continued to play, and returned again in 2019. Comben's improved efforts under Vic Country coach Leigh Brown at U18 level earned him the nickname "Mr. Upside" from AFL recruiters. He showed talent and athleticism for a key position player, and an ability to play effectively as a ruck and a key forward.

== AFL career ==
Comben was recruited by the North Melbourne Football Club with the 31st pick in the 2019 National Draft. His injury woes continued into his AFL career, as in early 2020 he suffered a small back fracture which interrupted his first season.

On return in January 2021, he was again sidelined by a tibial stress fracture requiring surgery. Upon recovering, he played a scratch match with a combined North Melbourne-Essendon reserves side against the Brisbane Lions reserves, his first game in 18 months. Comben kicked 4 goals in only a half, playing limited minutes to manage his return. Comben made his debut against the Sydney Swans in Round 22 of the 2021 AFL season. He kicked his first goal after the final siren to cut North's losing margin to 14 points. Unfortunately, Comben then broke his collarbone the following week in an incident at training, missing the final game of North's season.

Comben returned to the field in 2022 through the VFL, kicking 3 goals against Sandringham in Round 10. After complications caused by surgery the prior year of his tibial stress injury, he eventually returned to North's senior side in Round 23, as a late inclusion for Callum Coleman-Jones.

Comben played the first seven games of the 2023 AFL season for North, before suffering a serious ankle injury in a match against Melbourne, which sidelined him for much of remainder of the season. While injured, Comben joined the 200 Plus podcast with former Network 10 sports journalist Nick Butler, Brisbane Lions player Sam Draper and Collingwood Football Club player Darcy Cameron as a guest host before hosting full time in 2024.

Comben had a breakout season in 2024, becoming one of the league’s premier intercept markers. He is currently contracted to North Melbourne until the end of the 2027 season.

Amid reported interest from the incoming Tasmanian AFL team, in July 2026 Comben signed a six year contract extension with North, taking him until the end of the 2033 season.

== Statistics ==
Updated to the end of round 22, 2026.

Legend
G	Goals	K	Kicks	D	Disposals	T	Tackles
B	Behinds	H	Handballs	M	Marks

Season	Team	No.	Games	Totals							Averages (per game)							Votes
Season	Team	No.	Games	G	B	K	H	D	M	T	G	B	K	H	D	M	T	Votes
2021	North Melbourne	30	1	1	0	3	3	6	2	1	1.0	0.0	3.0	3.0	6.0	2.0	1.0	0
2022	North Melbourne	30	1	0	2	4	2	6	3	3	0.0	2.0	4.0	2.0	6.0	3.0	3.0	0
2023	North Melbourne	30	7	4	8	28	27	55	17	21	0.6	1.1	4.0	3.9	7.9	2.4	3.0	0
2024	North Melbourne	30	19	3	1	167	87	254	122	28	0.2	0.1	8.8	4.6	13.4	6.4	1.5	0
2025	North Melbourne	30	20	0	5	150	95	245	110	16	0.0	0.3	7.5	4.8	12.3	5.5	0.8	1
2026	North Melbourne	30	20	1	0	146	94	240	116	42	0.1	0.0	7.3	4.7	12.0	5.8	2.1	0
Career			68	9	16	498	308	806	370	111	0.1	0.2	7.3	4.5	11.9	5.4	1.6	1
