= Wil Dawson =

Australian rules footballer

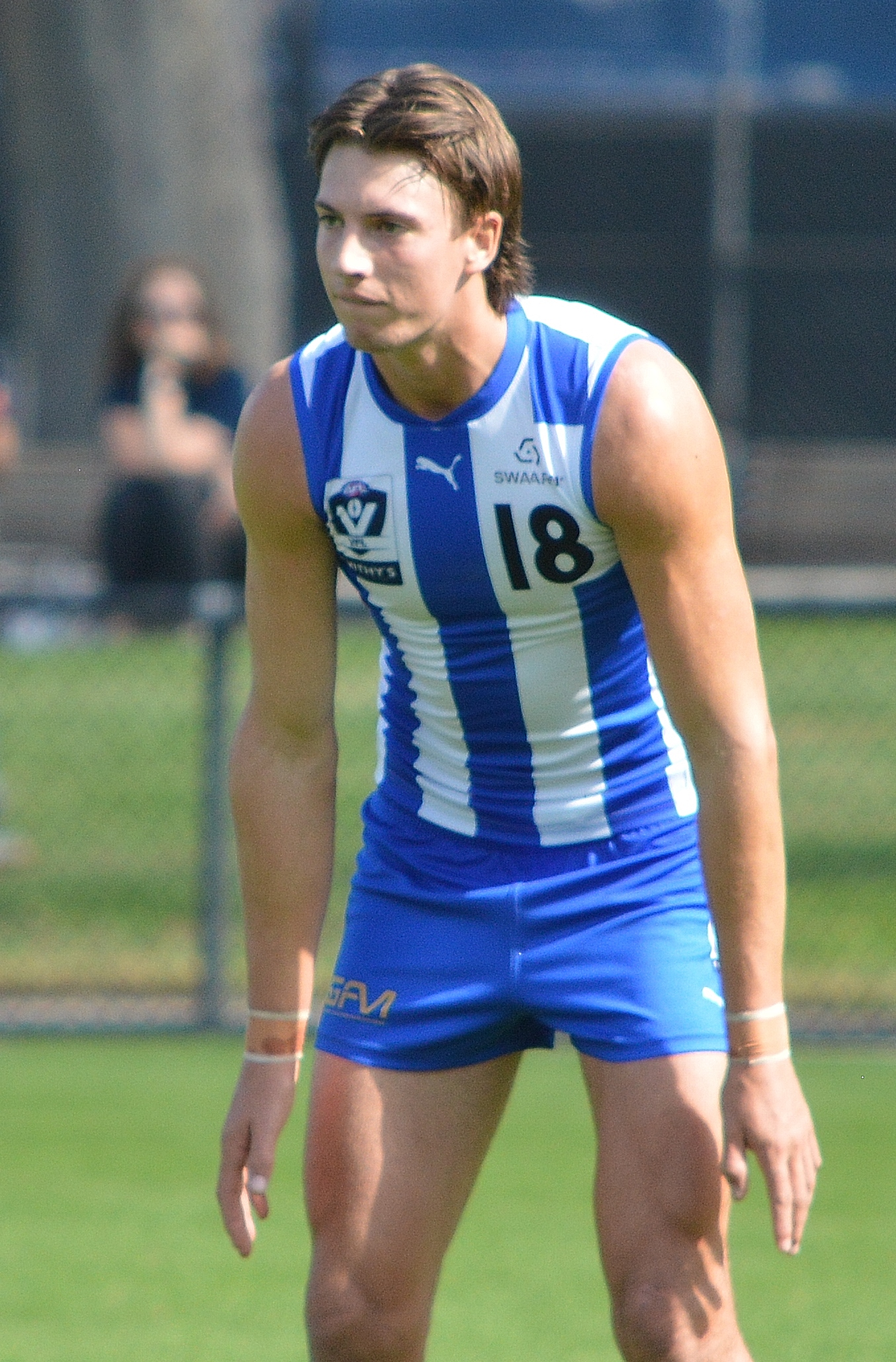
- Dawson with North Melbourne's VFL side in April 2025

Personal information
- Born: 20 December 2005 (age 20)
- Original team: Leongatha Junior Football Club (Vic)/Gippsland Power U18
- Draft: No. 22, 2023 national draft: North Melbourne
- Debut: Round 10, 2024, North Melbourne vs. Essendon, at Docklands
- Height: 200 cm (6 ft 7 in)
- Weight: 86 kg (190 lb)
- Position: Key Defender

Club information
- Current club: North Melbourne
- Number: 18

Playing career^{1}
Years	Club	Games (Goals)
2024–	North Melbourne	16 (0)
- ^{1} Playing statistics correct to the end of round 22, 2026.

Wil Dawson (born 20 December 2005) is a professional Australian rules footballer for the North Melbourne Football Club in the Australian Football League (AFL).

== AFL career ==
Dawson was recruited by North Melbourne with the 22nd overall selection in the 2023 national draft.

Dawson debuted for North Melbourne in round 10 of the 2024 AFL season in a 40-point loss to Essendon.

== Statistics ==
Updated to the end of round 22, 2026.

Legend
G	Goals	K	Kicks	D	Disposals	T	Tackles
B	Behinds	H	Handballs	M	Marks

Season	Team	No.	Games	Totals							Averages (per game)							Votes
Season	Team	No.	Games	G	B	K	H	D	M	T	G	B	K	H	D	M	T	Votes
2024	North Melbourne	18	3	0	0	10	6	16	7	3	0.0	0.0	3.3	2.0	5.3	2.3	1.0	0
2025	North Melbourne	18	5	0	0	27	8	35	22	14	0.0	0.0	5.4	1.6	7.0	4.4	2.8	0
2026	North Melbourne	18	8	0	3	23	25	48	15	22	0.0	0.4	2.9	3.1	6.0	1.9	2.8	0
Career			16	0	3	60	39	99	44	39	0.0	0.2	3.8	2.4	6.2	2.8	2.4	0
