= Jacob Konstanty =

Personal information
- Born: 9 November 2004 (age 21)
- Original teams: Gippsland (Talent League); Drouin (Gippsland League)
- Draft: No. 20, 2022 AFL draft
- Debut: Round 1, 2025, North Melbourne vs. Western Bulldogs, at Marvel Stadium
- Height: 177 cm (5 ft 10 in)
- Position: Forward

Club information
- Current club: North Melbourne
- Number: 41

Playing career^{1}
| Years | Club | Games (Goals) |
| 2023–2024 | Sydney | 0 (0) |
| 2025– | North Melbourne | 33 (18) |
- ^{1} Playing statistics correct to the end of round 22, 2026.

Jacob Konstanty (born 9 November 2004) is a professional Australian rules footballer who plays for the North Melbourne Football Club in the Australian Football League (AFL), having also been listed with the Sydney Swans.

== Junior career ==
Konstanty played junior football for the Gippsland Power in the Talent League. He averaged over 14 disposals and 1.2 goals a game in his draft year. He also played for Vic Country in the Under 18 Championships, where he averaged 11.3 disposals and 1.3 goals a game.

== AFL career ==
Konstanty was selected with pick 20 of the 2022 AFL draft by the Sydney Swans. He was unable to make a debut for the Swans and was traded along with Luke Parker to North Melbourne at the end of the 2024 AFL season.

Konstanty debuted against the Western Bulldogs in round 1 of the 2025 AFL season. In a successful debut season, Konstanty played every game for the Kangaroos, kicking 11 goals and receiving over 100 votes in the Syd Barker Medal.

== Statistics ==
Updated to the end of round 22, 2026.

Legend
| G | Goals | K | Kicks | D | Disposals | T | Tackles |
| B | Behinds | H | Handballs | M | Marks |

| Season | Team | No. | Games | Totals | | | | | | | Averages (per game) | | | | | | | Votes |
| Season | Team | No. | Games | G | B | K | H | D | M | T | G | B | K | H | D | M | T | Votes |
|---|---|---|---|---|---|---|---|---|---|---|---|---|---|---|---|---|---|---|
| 2023 | Sydney | 18 | 0 | — | — | — | — | — | — | — | — | — | — | — | — | — | — | 0 |
| 2024 | Sydney | 18 | 0 | — | — | — | — | — | — | — | — | — | — | — | — | — | — | 0 |
| 2025 | North Melbourne | 41 | 23 | 11 | 13 | 114 | 96 | 210 | 38 | 79 | 0.5 | 0.6 | 5.0 | 4.2 | 9.1 | 1.7 | 3.4 | 0 |
| 2026 | North Melbourne | 41 | 10 | 7 | 4 | 43 | 52 | 95 | 25 | 23 | 0.7 | 0.4 | 4.3 | 5.2 | 9.5 | 2.5 | 2.3 | 0 |
| Career | | | 33 | 18 | 17 | 157 | 148 | 305 | 63 | 102 | 0.5 | 0.5 | 4.8 | 4.5 | 9.2 | 1.9 | 3.1 | 0 |
