= Finn O'Sullivan =

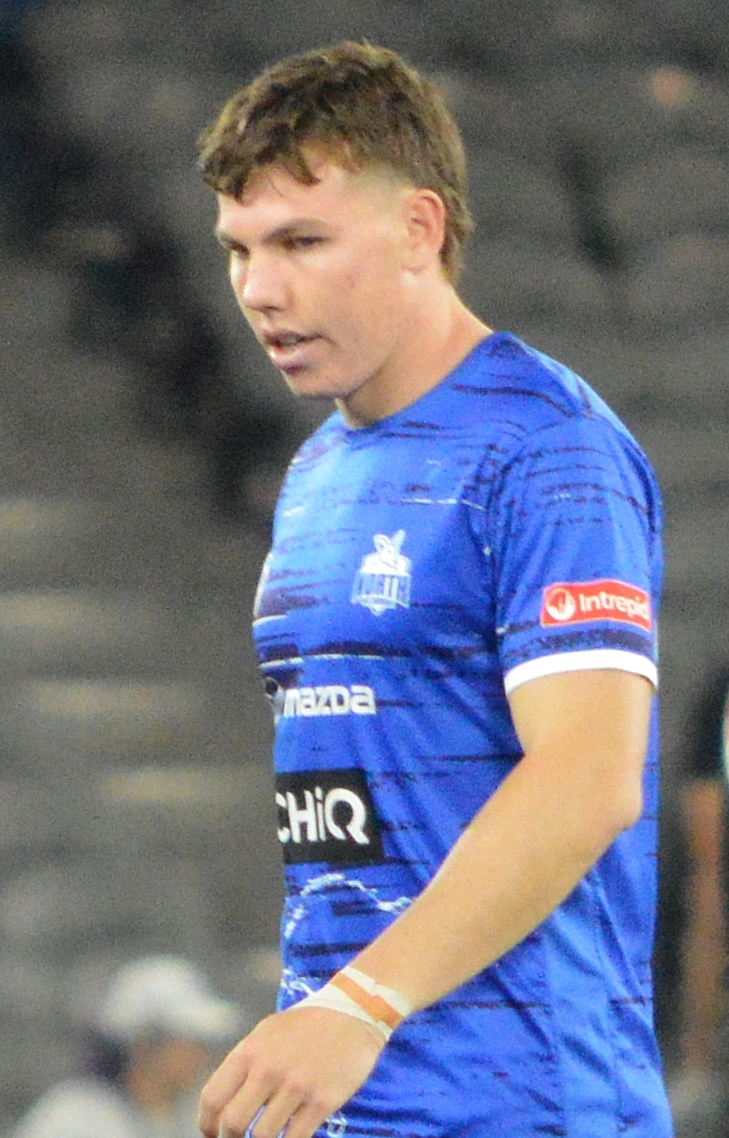
- O'Sullivan in March 2026

Personal information
- Born: 30 May 2006 (age 20)
- Original team: Oakleigh Chargers(Talent League)/Koroit
- Draft: No. 2, 2024 AFL draft
- Debut: Round 1, 2025, North Melbourne vs. Western Bulldogs, at Marvel Stadium
- Height: 183 cm (6 ft 0 in)
- Position: Midfielder

Club information
- Current club: North Melbourne
- Number: 2

Playing career^{1}
Years	Club	Games (Goals)
2025–	North Melbourne	41 (6)
- ^{1} Playing statistics correct to the end of the 2026 season.

Career highlights
- AFL Rising Star nominee: 2025

Finn O'Sullivan (born 30 May 2006) is a professional Australian rules footballer playing for the North Melbourne Football Club in the Australian Football League (AFL).

== Junior career ==
O'Sullivan played for the Oakleigh Chargers in the Talent League. He averaged over 17 disposals and 1.3 goals per game in his draft year. He also represented Vic Country in the Under 18 Championships, averaging 11.5 disposals over the course of 2 games in his draft year.

== AFL career ==
O'Sullivan was selected by North Melbourne with pick 2 of the 2024 AFL draft. He made his debut in round 1 of the 2025 AFL season against the Western Bulldogs. He had 16 disposals on debut.

In round 15 of the 2025 AFL season, O'Sullivan had 18 disposals to earn himself a nomination for the 2025 AFL Rising Star.

== Personal life ==
O'Sullivan is the second cousin of Carlton midfielder Sam Walsh. His father, Nick, was a North Melbourne listed player but did not play a senior AFL game.

He grew up in the Victorian country town of Koroit and played junior football for local club Koroit Football Club. He completed school while boarding at Xavier College in Melbourne.

== Statistics ==
Updated to the end of round 22, 2026.

Legend
G	Goals	K	Kicks	D	Disposals	T	Tackles
B	Behinds	H	Handballs	M	Marks

Season	Team	No.	Games	Totals							Averages (per game)							Votes
Season	Team	No.	Games	G	B	K	H	D	M	T	G	B	K	H	D	M	T	Votes
2025	North Melbourne	2	22	1	4	180	135	315	88	36	0.0	0.2	8.2	6.1	14.3	4.0	1.6	0
2026	North Melbourne	2	17	5	6	159	172	331	69	47	0.3	0.4	9.4	10.1	19.5	4.1	2.8	0
Career			39	6	10	339	307	646	157	83	0.2	0.3	8.7	7.9	16.6	4.0	2.1	0
