= Cooper Harvey =

Australian rules footballer

Personal information
- Full name: Cooper Harvey
- Born: 12 July 2004 (age 22)
- Original team: Yarrambat (Vic)/Northern Knights
- Draft: No. 56 (F/S), 2022 national draft: North Melbourne
- Debut: Round 17, 2023, North Melbourne vs. Geelong, at Kardinia Park
- Height: 180 cm (5 ft 11 in)
- Weight: 81 kg (179 lb)
- Position: Forward

Club information
- Current club: North Melbourne
- Number: 37

Playing career^{1}
Years	Club	Games (Goals)
2023–	North Melbourne	17 (11)
- ^{1} Playing statistics correct to the end of round 22, 2026.

Cooper Harvey (born 12 July 2004) is a professional Australian rules footballer for the North Melbourne Football Club in the Australian Football League (AFL).

== AFL career ==
Harvey was recruited by North Melbourne with the 56th overall selection in the 2022 national draft. He is the son of former North Melbourne star Brent Harvey.

Harvey debuted for North Melbourne in round 17 of the 2023 AFL season in a 62-point loss to Geelong.

After playing 17 games over four seasons at North Melbourne, Harvey was delisted by the Kangaroos at the end of the 2026 season.

== Statistics ==
Updated to the end of round 22, 2026.

Legend
G	Goals	K	Kicks	D	Disposals	T	Tackles
B	Behinds	H	Handballs	M	Marks

Season	Team	No.	Games	Totals							Averages (per game)							Votes
Season	Team	No.	Games	G	B	K	H	D	M	T	G	B	K	H	D	M	T	Votes
2023	North Melbourne	37	3	1	0	17	11	28	11	6	0.3	0.0	5.7	3.7	9.3	3.7	2.0	0
2024	North Melbourne	37	0	—	—	—	—	—	—	—	—	—	—	—	—	—	—	0
2025	North Melbourne	37	7	10	5	41	19	60	24	9	1.4	0.7	5.9	2.7	8.6	3.4	1.3	0
2026	North Melbourne	37	7	0	0	82	56	138	39	11	0.0	0.0	11.7	8.0	19.7	5.6	1.6	0
Career			17	11	5	140	86	226	74	26	0.6	0.3	8.2	5.1	13.3	4.4	1.5	0
