= Tom Powell (Australian footballer) =

Australian football league player

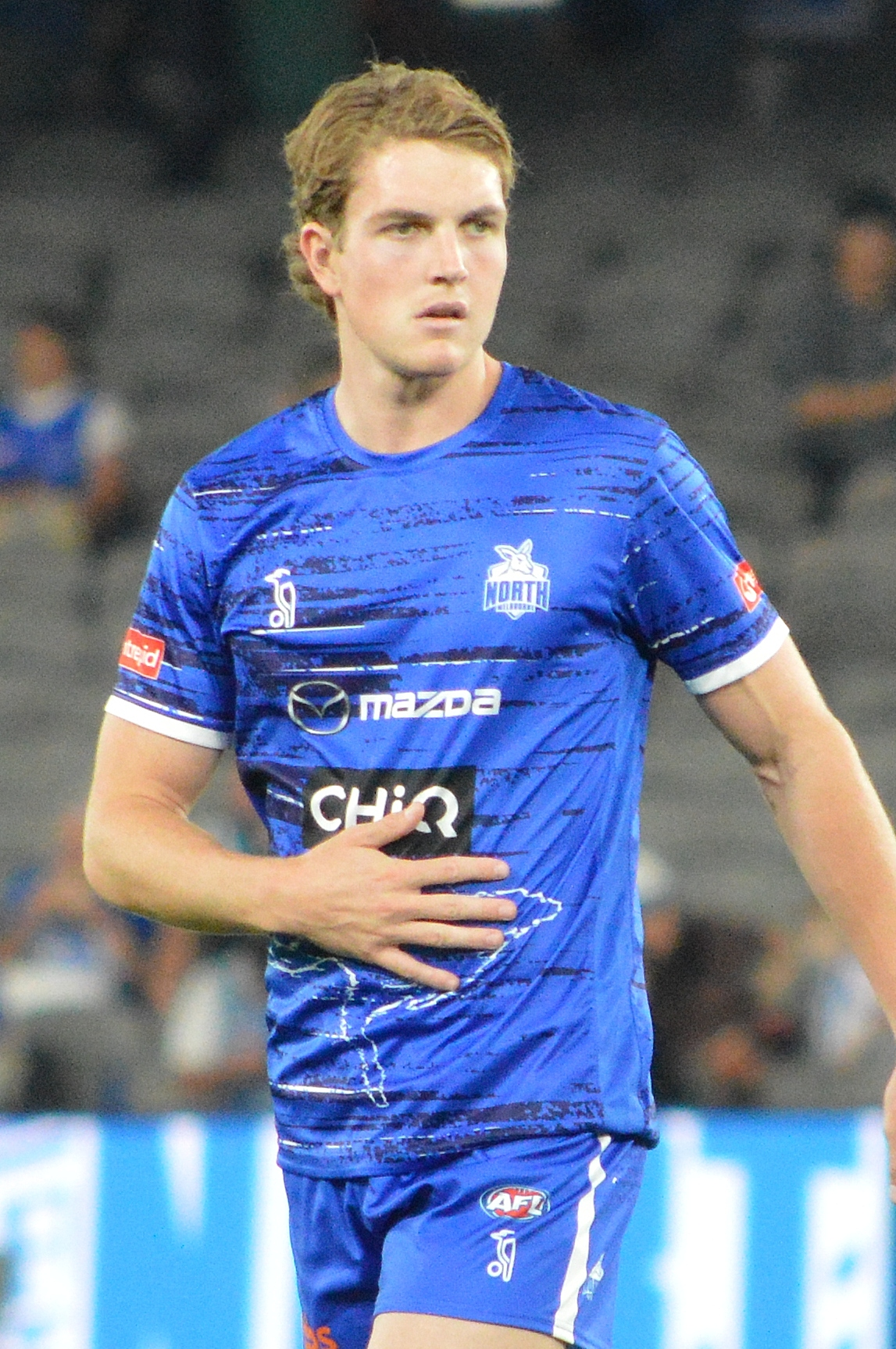
- Powell in March 2026

Personal information
- Full name: Thomas Powell
- Born: 2 March 2002 (age 24)
- Original team: Sturt (SANFL)
- Draft: No. 13, 2020 AFL draft, North Melbourne
- Debut: 21 March 2021, North Melbourne vs. Port Adelaide, at Docklands Stadium
- Height: 184 cm (6 ft 0 in)
- Weight: 75 kg (165 lb)
- Position: Midfielder

Club information
- Current club: North Melbourne
- Number: 24

Playing career^{1}
Years	Club	Games (Goals)
2021–	North Melbourne	99 (34)
- ^{1} Playing statistics correct to the end of the 2026 season.

Tom Powell (born 2 March 2002) is an Australian rules footballer who plays for North Melbourne in the Australian Football League (AFL). He was recruited by North Melbourne with the 13th draft pick in the 2020 AFL draft.

== Early football ==
Powell participated in the Auskick program at Concordia, South Australia and began his junior football at the Unley Jets Football Club in Kingswood, South Australia. He began studying at Scotch College in Adelaide when he reached Year 8. He played school football there for the duration of his studies. He played with Sturt in the South Australian National Football League, participating in 4 games which he all won. He averaged 24.3 disposals a game, and won the McCallum Tomkins Medal for the best player in the SANFL Under 18s.

== AFL career ==
Powell debuted in the opening round of the 2021 AFL season, where North Melbourne suffered a loss at the hands of Port Adelaide. On debut, Powell kicked a goal with his first kick, and collected 12 disposals overall with 3 marks and 4 rebound 50s.

== Statistics ==
Updated to the end of the 2026 season.

Legend
G	Goals	K	Kicks	D	Disposals	T	Tackles
B	Behinds	H	Handballs	M	Marks

Season	Team	No.	Games	Totals							Averages (per game)							Votes
Season	Team	No.	Games	G	B	K	H	D	M	T	G	B	K	H	D	M	T	Votes
2021	North Melbourne	24	13	4	2	107	110	217	47	48	0.3	0.2	8.2	8.5	16.7	3.6	3.7	0
2022	North Melbourne	24	18	5	0	126	137	263	47	46	0.3	0.0	7.0	7.6	14.6	2.6	2.6	0
2023	North Melbourne	24	14	7	4	94	136	230	39	27	0.5	0.3	6.7	9.7	16.4	2.8	1.9	0
2024	North Melbourne	24	23	9	2	220	242	462	86	96	0.4	0.1	9.6	10.5	20.1	3.7	4.2	0
2025	North Melbourne	24	23	6	6	241	288	529	88	109	0.3	0.3	10.5	12.5	23.0	3.8	4.7	5
2026	North Melbourne	24	8	3	6	81	53	134	40	22	0.4	0.8	10.1	6.6	16.8	5.0	2.8	0
Career			99	34	20	869	966	1835	347	348	0.3	0.2	8.8	9.8	18.5	3.5	3.5	5
