= Robert Hansen Jr. =

Australian rules footballer

Robert Hansen
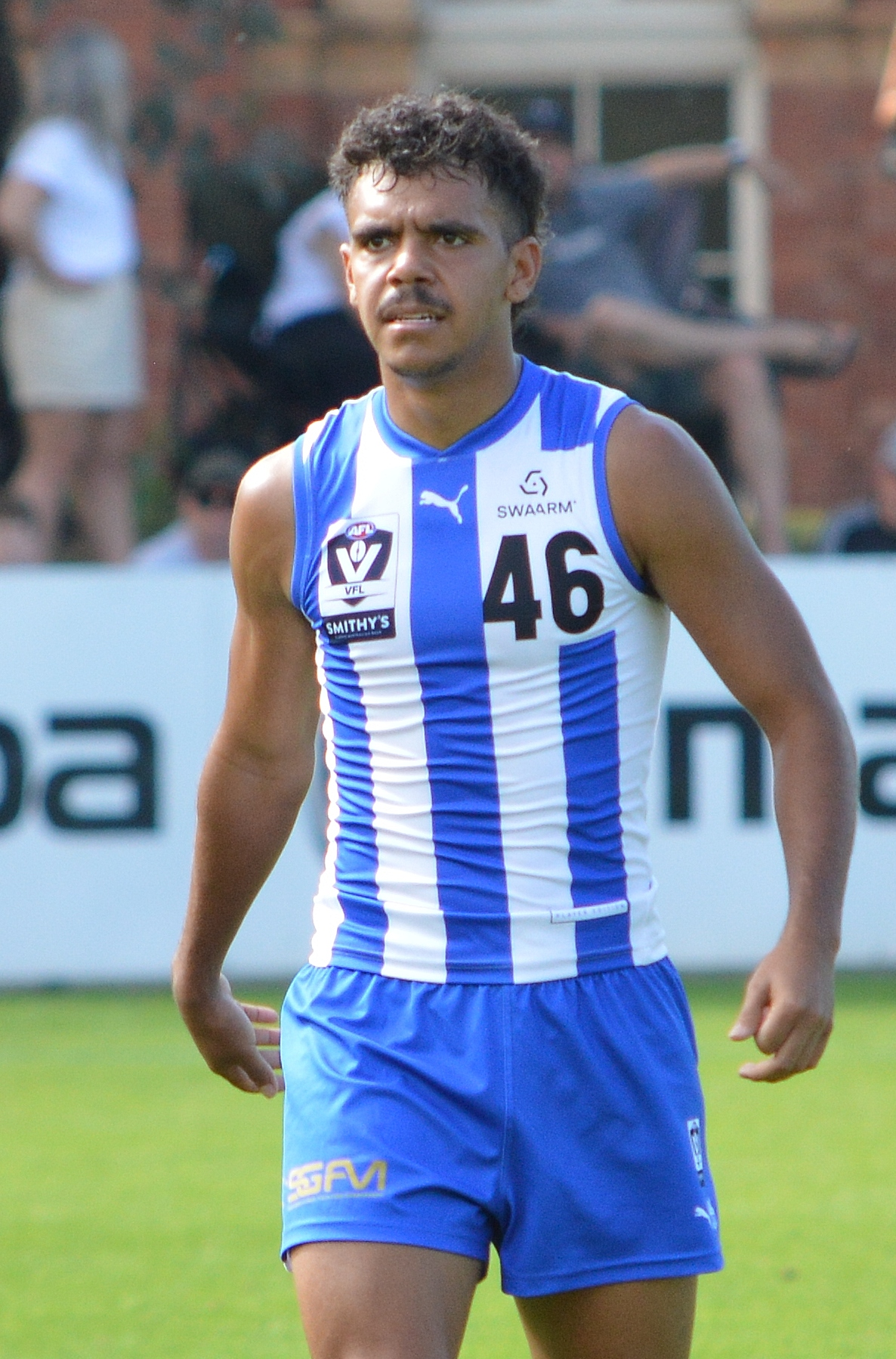
- Hansen with North Melbourne's VFL side in April 2025

Personal information
- Full name: Robert Hansen Jr
- Born: 13 March 2004 (age 22)
- Original team: Mines Rovers (WA)/Trinity College (WA)/Subiaco (WAFL)
- Draft: No. 2, 2023 mid-season rookie draft: North Melbourne
- Debut: Round 20, 2023, North Melbourne vs. West Coast, at Perth Stadium
- Height: 182 cm (6 ft 0 in)
- Weight: 76 kg (168 lb)
- Position: Forward

Club information
- Current club: North Melbourne
- Number: 46

Playing career^{1}
Years	Club	Games (Goals)
2023–2026	North Melbourne	20 (7)
- ^{1} Playing statistics correct to the end of the 2026 season.

Robert Hansen Jr. (born 13 March 2004) is a professional Australian rules footballer for the North Melbourne Football Club in the Australian Football League (AFL).

== Early life ==
Hansen hails from Kalgoorlie, Western Australia. He played for Mines Rovers Football Club as a child before moving to Perth at age 10 and went through Subiaco Football Club's development pathways, as well as school football for Trinity College.

== AFL career ==
Hansen was recruited by North Melbourne with the 2nd overall selection in the 2023 mid-season rookie draft.

Hansen debuted for North Melbourne in round 20 of the 2023 AFL season in a 5-point loss to West Coast.

== Statistics ==
Statistics are correct to the end of 2026

Legend
G	Goals	K	Kicks	D	Disposals	T	Tackles
B	Behinds	H	Handballs	M	Marks

Season	Team	No.	Games	Totals							Averages (per game)						
Season	Team	No.	Games	G	B	K	H	D	M	T	G	B	K	H	D	M	T
2023	North Melbourne	46	2	0	2	4	4	8	1	4	0.0	1.0	2.0	2.0	4.0	0.5	2.0
2024	North Melbourne	46	6	4	2	26	25	51	10	4	0.7	0.3	4.3	4.2	8.5	1.7	0.7
2025	North Melbourne	46	12	3	1	62	42	104	26	8	0.3	0.1	5.2	3.5	8.7	2.2	0.7
Career			20	7	5	92	71	163	37	16	0.4	0.3	4.6	3.6	8.2	1.9	0.8

== Personal life ==
Hansen's father, Robert Hansen, played football in Kalgoorlie and tallied 38 senior games in the late 1990s for Subiaco Football Club.

Hansen's cousin, Tyrell Dewar, was on the West Coast Eagles playing list as of 2023.
