= Bailey Scott =

Australian rules footballer

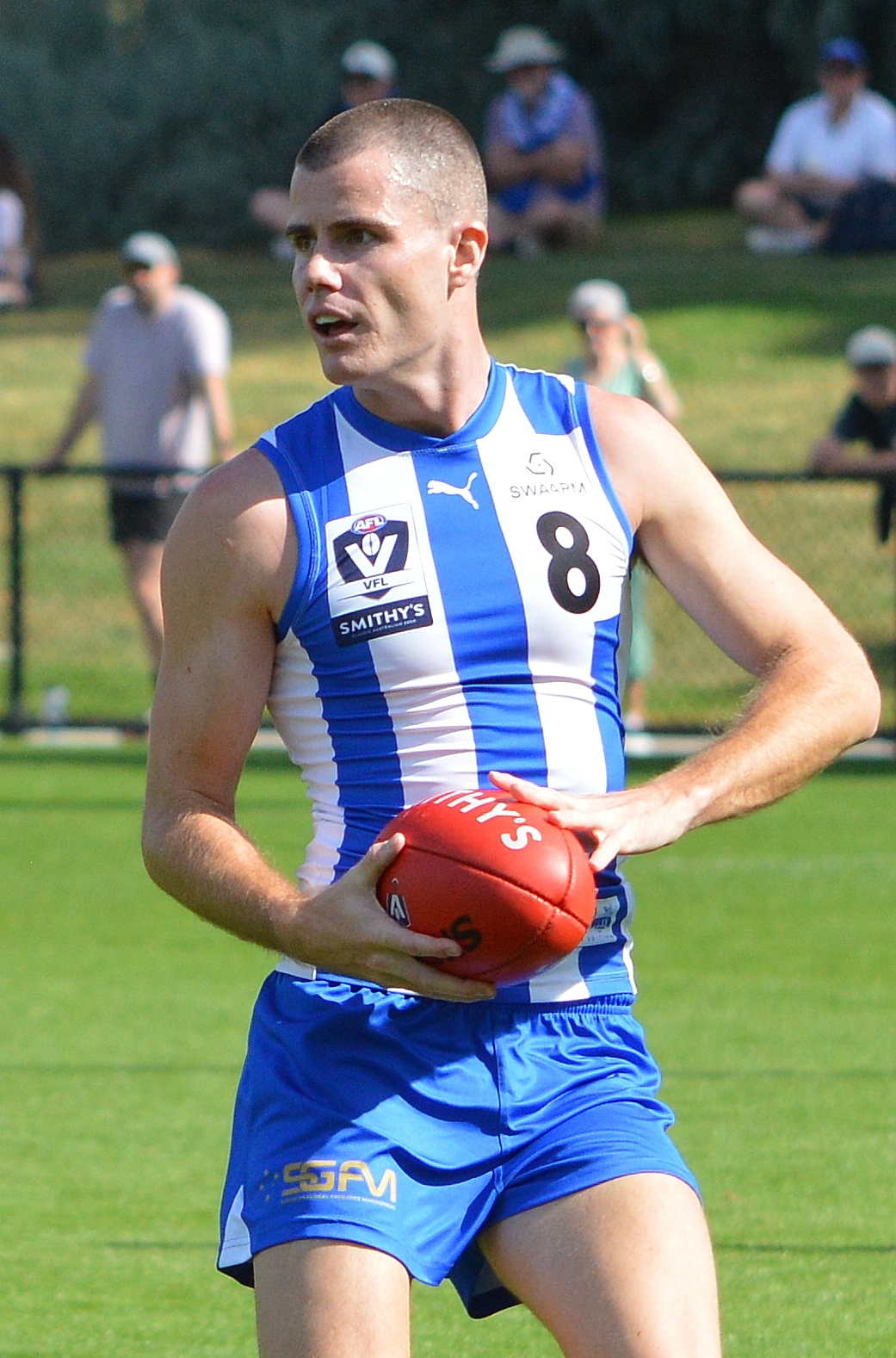
- Scott with North Melbourne's VFL side in April 2025

Personal information
- Full name: Bailey Scott
- Born: 9 July 2000 (age 26); Geelong, Victoria
- Original team: Broadbeach (QAFL)/Gold Coast Suns (NEAFL)
- Draft: No. 49, 2018 national draft
- Height: 186 cm (6 ft 1 in)
- Weight: 73 kg (161 lb)
- Positions: Midfielder, Medium forward

Club information
- Current club: North Melbourne
- Number: 8

Playing career^{1}
Years	Club	Games (Goals)
2019–2026	North Melbourne	116 (35)
- ^{1} Playing statistics correct to the end of round 22, 2026: AFL Rising Star nominee: 2019.

Bailey Scott (born 9 July 2000) is a former professional Australian rules footballer who played for the North Melbourne Football Club in the Australian Football League (AFL).

== Early life ==
Scott was born in Geelong. His father, Robert, was a professional footballer who played for Geelong and North Melbourne between 1986 and 2000. Robert played 245 games at the highest level and was a premiership player for the Kangaroos in 1996. At the age of nine, Bailey moved to Gold Coast, Queensland with his family and began playing junior football for the Broadbeach Cats. A talented junior footballer, Scott joined the Gold Coast Suns Academy at the age of 12 while attending St Andrews Lutheran College.

In his final year of junior football, Scott was selected to captain the Gold Coast in the Academy Series and the Allies in the 2018 AFL Under 18 Championships. He was subsequently named in the All-Australian team for his performances in the national championships. In October 2018, he elected to be drafted by North Melbourne as a father-son selection, despite also having the option to join Geelong or Gold Coast. The Kangaroos drafted Scott with pick 49 in the 2018 AFL draft.

== AFL career ==
Scott debuted for North Melbourne in round 1 of the 2019 AFL season. He won the Round 1 AFL Rising Star nomination in his debut, with 21 disposals and two goals.

Scott played his 100th game for the Kangaroos in August 2024. in the same month, Scott extended his contract with North until the end of the 2026 AFL season.

Scott was delisted by North at the end of the 2026 AFL season.

== Statistics ==
Updated to the end of round 22, 2026.

Legend
G	Goals	K	Kicks	D	Disposals	T	Tackles
B	Behinds	H	Handballs	M	Marks

Season	Team	No.	Games	Totals							Averages (per game)							Votes
Season	Team	No.	Games	G	B	K	H	D	M	T	G	B	K	H	D	M	T	Votes
2019	North Melbourne	30	4	3	1	26	27	53	15	5	0.8	0.3	6.5	6.8	13.3	3.8	1.3	0
2020 (Note: The 2020 season was played with 17 home-and-away matches per team (down from 22) and 16-minute quarters with time on (down from 20-minute quarters with time on) due to the impact of the COVID-19 pandemic.)	North Melbourne	8	13	8	1	81	57	138	39	29	0.6	0.1	6.2	4.4	10.6	3.0	2.2	0
2021	North Melbourne	8	17	8	5	111	106	217	52	32	0.5	0.3	6.5	6.2	12.8	3.1	1.9	0
2022	North Melbourne	8	21	3	2	247	135	382	95	36	0.1	0.1	11.8	6.4	18.2	4.5	1.7	1
2023	North Melbourne	8	23	5	5	330	179	509	120	60	0.2	0.2	14.3	7.8	22.1	5.2	2.6	4
2024	North Melbourne	8	23	5	3	313	154	467	115	58	0.2	0.1	13.6	6.7	20.3	5.0	2.5	0
2025	North Melbourne	8	12	3	2	73	53	126	44	18	0.3	0.2	6.1	4.4	10.5	3.7	1.5	0
2026	North Melbourne	8	3	0	1	16	19	35	11	8	0.0	0.3	5.3	6.3	11.7	3.7	2.7	0
Career			116	35	20	1197	730	1927	491	246	0.3	0.2	10.3	6.3	16.6	4.2	2.1	5
