= Zane Duursma =

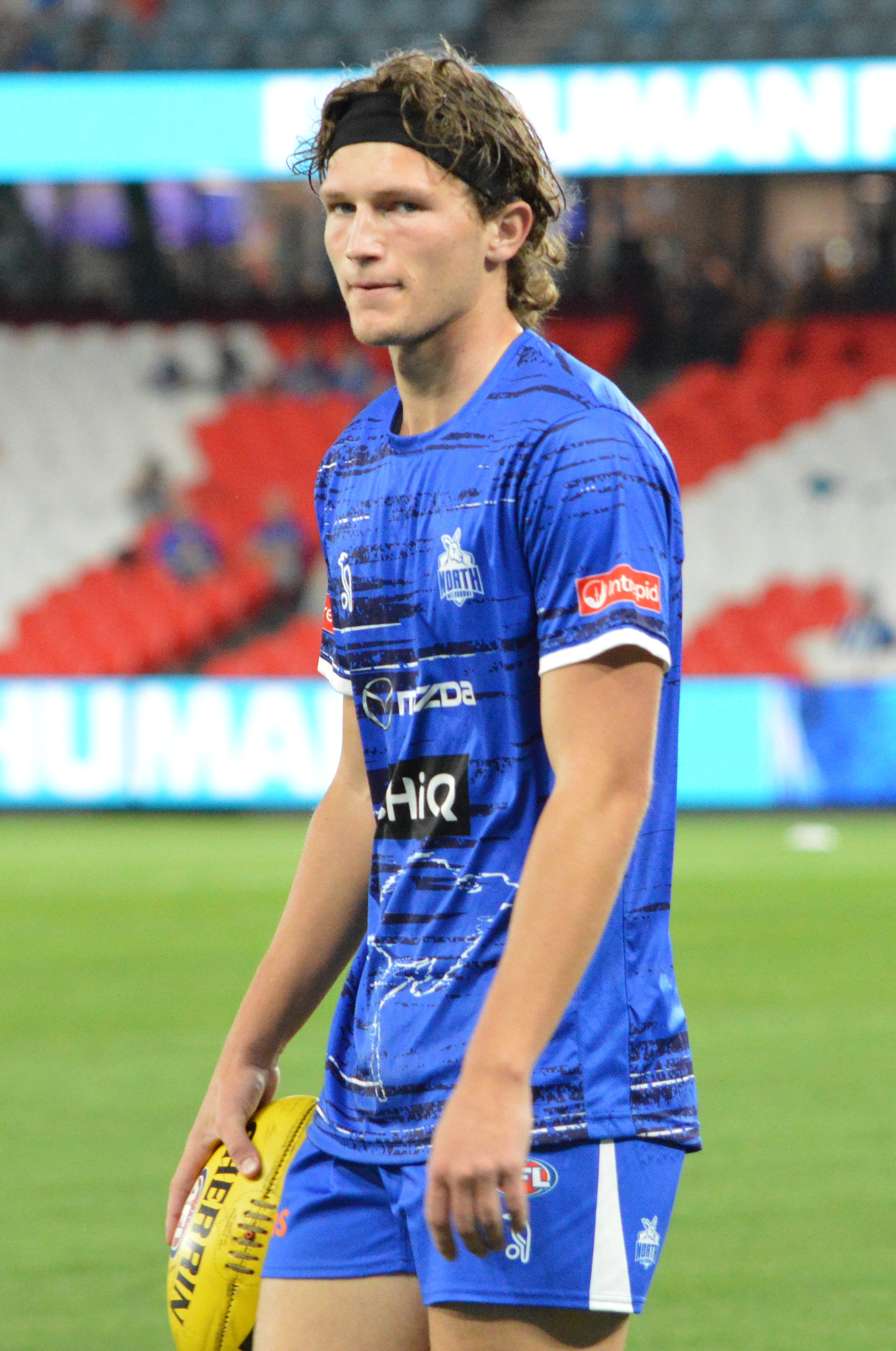
- Duursma in March 2026

Personal information
- Full name: Zane Duursma
- Born: 28 August 2005 (age 21)
- Original teams: Foster, Gippsland Power
- Draft: No. 4, 2023 AFL draft
- Height: 190 cm (6 ft 3 in)
- Position: Forward

Club information
- Current club: Melbourne

Playing career^{1}
Years	Club	Games (Goals)
2024–2026	North Melbourne	38 (28)
2027–	Melbourne	0 (0)
Total		38 (28)
- ^{1} Playing statistics correct to the end of 2026.

Zane Duursma is a professional Australian rules footballer for the Melbourne Football Club in the Australian Football League (AFL). He was originally selected by North Melbourne as the number four pick in the 2023 AFL draft.

== Career ==
Duursma played for Gippsland Power in the Coates Talent League as a forward, kicking over 30 goals in each of his two seasons with the club, earning Best and Fairest honours at the club, as well as All Australian and Coates Talent League Team of the Year inclusions. He was also selected for Vic Country in the 2022 and 2023 AFL National Championships. On the back of these performances, he was selected fourth in the 2023 draft, after North Melbourne's original bid for Jed Walter was matched by Gold Coast.

Duursma made his AFL debut in the Kangaroo's Round 1 match against Greater Western Sydney kicking two goals in a 39 point loss.

Seeking consistent senior opportunities, Duursma requested a trade to Melbourne after the 2026 AFL season. The trade was made official on 13 October.

== Personal life ==
Duursma is the third of his siblings to enter the AFL system, with older brother Xavier drafted by Port Adelaide in the 2018 AFL draft and later moving to Essendon, older sister Yasmin having played for Port Adelaide and Carlton in the AFLW, and younger brother Willem being drafted to West Coast with the number one pick in the 2025 AFL draft. He is the nephew of former Sydney, Brisbane and Melbourne player Jamie Duursma.

== Statistics ==
Updated to the end of round 22, 2026.

Legend
G	Goals	K	Kicks	D	Disposals	T	Tackles
B	Behinds	H	Handballs	M	Marks

Season	Team	No.	Games	Totals							Averages (per game)							Votes
Season	Team	No.	Games	G	B	K	H	D	M	T	G	B	K	H	D	M	T	Votes
2024	North Melbourne	7	13	9	8	59	38	97	40	10	0.7	0.6	4.5	2.9	7.5	3.1	0.8	0
2025	North Melbourne	7	10	4	4	41	27	68	29	4	0.4	0.4	4.1	2.7	6.8	2.9	0.4	0
2026	North Melbourne	7	15	15	12	64	35	99	43	14	1.0	0.8	4.3	2.3	6.6	2.9	0.9	0
Career			38	28	24	164	100	264	112	28	0.7	0.6	4.3	2.6	6.9	2.9	0.7	0
