= Taylor Goad =

Australian rules footballer (born 2005)

Personal information
- Born: 28 April 2005 (age 21)
- Original team: Willunga
- Draft: No. 20, 2023 national draft
- Height: 207 cm (6 ft 9 in)
- Position: Ruckman

Club information
- Current club: North Melbourne
- Number: 22

Playing career
Years	Club	Games (Goals)
2026–	North Melbourne	2 (0)

Taylor Goad (born 28 April 2005) is an Australian rules footballer who plays for North Melbourne in the Australian Football League (AFL).

Originally from McLaren Vale, a town near Adelaide, Goad was educated at Westminster School and concentrated primarily on basketball during his youth. He played junior football for Willunga from the age of 10 to the under-14s after which his football was limited to schoolboy games. While he was considering pursuing a college basketball career, a friend of Goad gave his contact details to South Adelaide's talent manager, who convinced him to attend pre-season training with the SANFL club.

Goad was a member of an under-18s premiership-winning team in his first season with South Adelaide in 2023, averaging 21 hit-outs a game. He represented the South Australia under-18s team at the 2023 AFL National Championships, helping them to a win over Vic Country.

A 207 cm ruckman, Goad impressed at the Draft Combine by running the 20m sprint in under three seconds, and was selected by North Melbourne with pick 20 in the 2023 national draft. He played in all 18 rounds of the 2024 VFL season, as either a ruckman or tall defender, and at the start of 2025 signed a contract extension with North Melbourne, securing his services through to the end of the 2028 season. During the 2026 AFL season, Goad made his senior debut in North Melbourne's one-point win over the West Coast Eagles at Perth Stadium in round 14.
