= Brynn Teakle =

Australian rules footballer

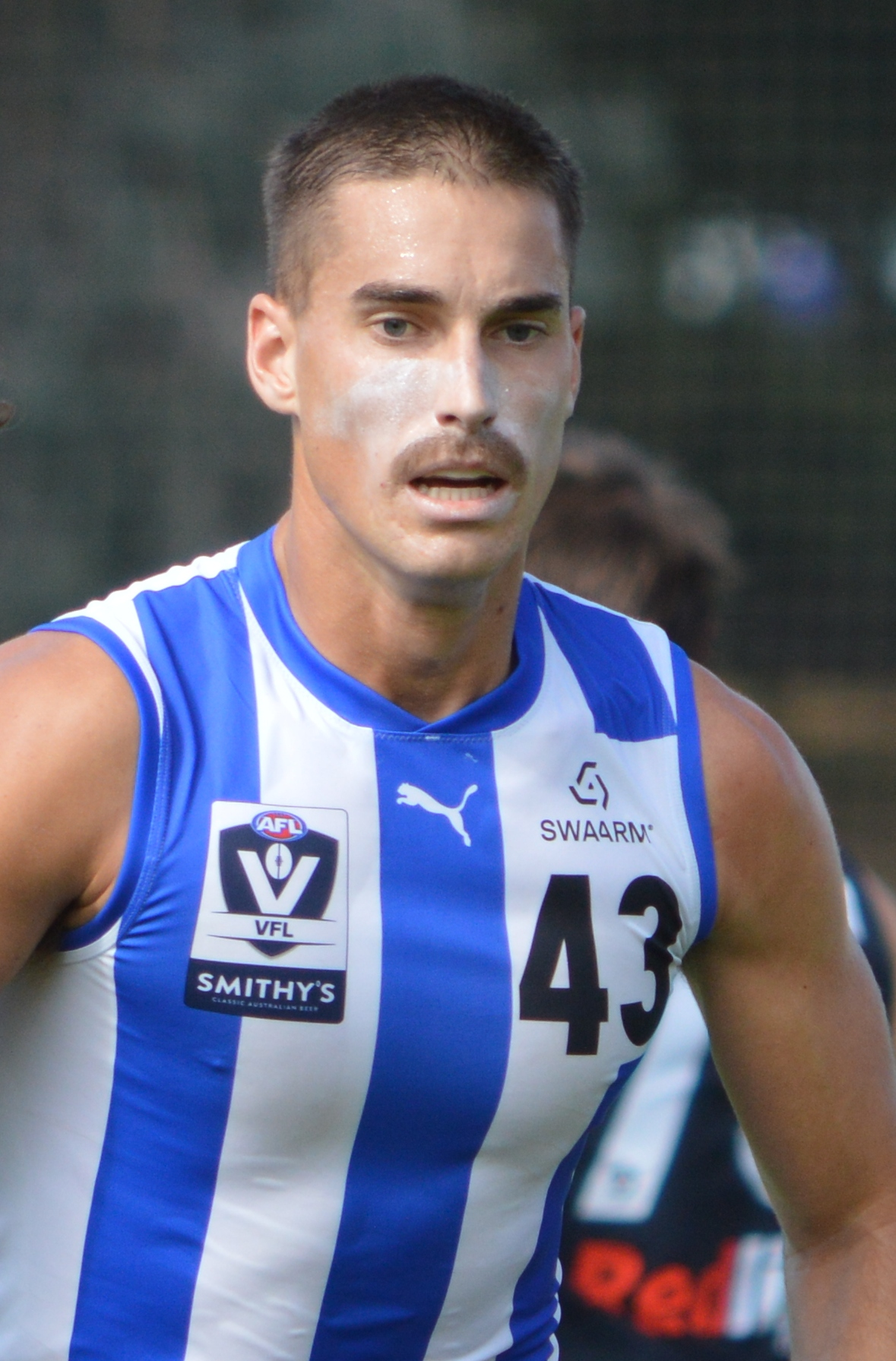
- Teakle with North Melbourne's VFL side in April 2025

Personal information
- Full name: Brynn Teakle
- Born: 16 October 1999 (age 27); Northampton, Western Australia
- Original team: East Fremantle
- Draft: No. 8, 2022 mid-season rookie draft No. 15, 2024 mid-season rookie draft
- Debut: Round 14, 2022, Port Adelaide vs. Sydney, at Adelaide Oval
- Height: 203 cm (6 ft 8 in)
- Weight: 99 kg (218 lb)
- Position: Ruckman

Playing career
Years	Club	Games (Goals)
2022–2023	Port Adelaide	6 (1)
2024–2025	North Melbourne	15 (10)
Total		21 (11)

Brynn Teakle (born 16 October 1999) is a former Australian rules footballer who played for Port Adelaide and North Melbourne in the Australian Football League (AFL).

Brynn is the cousin of Port Adelaide women's player Julia Teakle.

== Early career ==
Teakle moved to East Fremantle from Northampton as a junior. He progressed from the colts to the seniors, making his senior debut in 2019.

Teakle spend the pre-season ahead of the 2020 AFL season training with Essendon to try win a spot on their rookie list through the Supplemental Selection Period (SSP), however did not receive a contract offer.

== AFL career ==
=== Port Adelaide (2022-2023) ===
Teakle was the eighth player picked in the 2022 mid-season draft. He made his AFL debut in Round 14 of the 2022 AFL season against Sydney at Adelaide Oval. Halfway into the second quarter he broke his collarbone that required surgery.

In 2023 he played a further four games and kicked his only goal for the club. He was delisted at the end of the season.

=== North Melbourne (2024-2025) ===
Having spent the off-season unsuccessfully trialling at Collingwood for a rookie list spot through the SSP, Teakle returned to East Fremantle where good form earned him selection in a state game between Western Australia and South Australia, where he attracted the attention of the North Melbourne, which subsequently North selected him with pick 15 of the 2024 mid-season rookie draft. Teakle played 15 matches for North Melbourne over a season and a half at the club, before was delisted in August following the 2025 AFL season.

== Post AFL ==
In 2026 Teakle played for Collingwood's VFL team.

== Statistics ==
Updated to the end of 2025.

Legend
G	Goals	K	Kicks	D	Disposals	T	Tackles
B	Behinds	H	Handballs	M	Marks	H/O	Hit-outs

Season	Team	No.	Games	Totals								Averages (per game)							
Season	Team	No.	Games	G	B	K	H	D	M	T	H/O	G	B	K	H	D	M	T	H/O
2022	Port Adelaide	27	2	0	0	7	10	17	2	10	28	0.0	0.0	3.5	5.0	8.5	1.0	5.0	14.0
2023	Port Adelaide	27	4	1	2	16	25	41	5	14	83	0.0	0.0	4.0	6.3	10.3	1.3	3.5	20.8
2024	North Melbourne	43	11	9	2	45	35	80	35	10	57	0.1	0.0	4.1	3.2	7.3	2.6	0.9	5.2
2025	North Melbourne	43	4	1	1	27	14	41	11	17	63	0.3	0.3	6.8	3.5	10.3	2.8	4.3	15.8
Career			21	11	5	95	84	179	46	51	231	0.5	0.2	4.5	4.0	8.5	2.2	2.4	11.0
