= Kallan Dawson =

Australian rules footballer

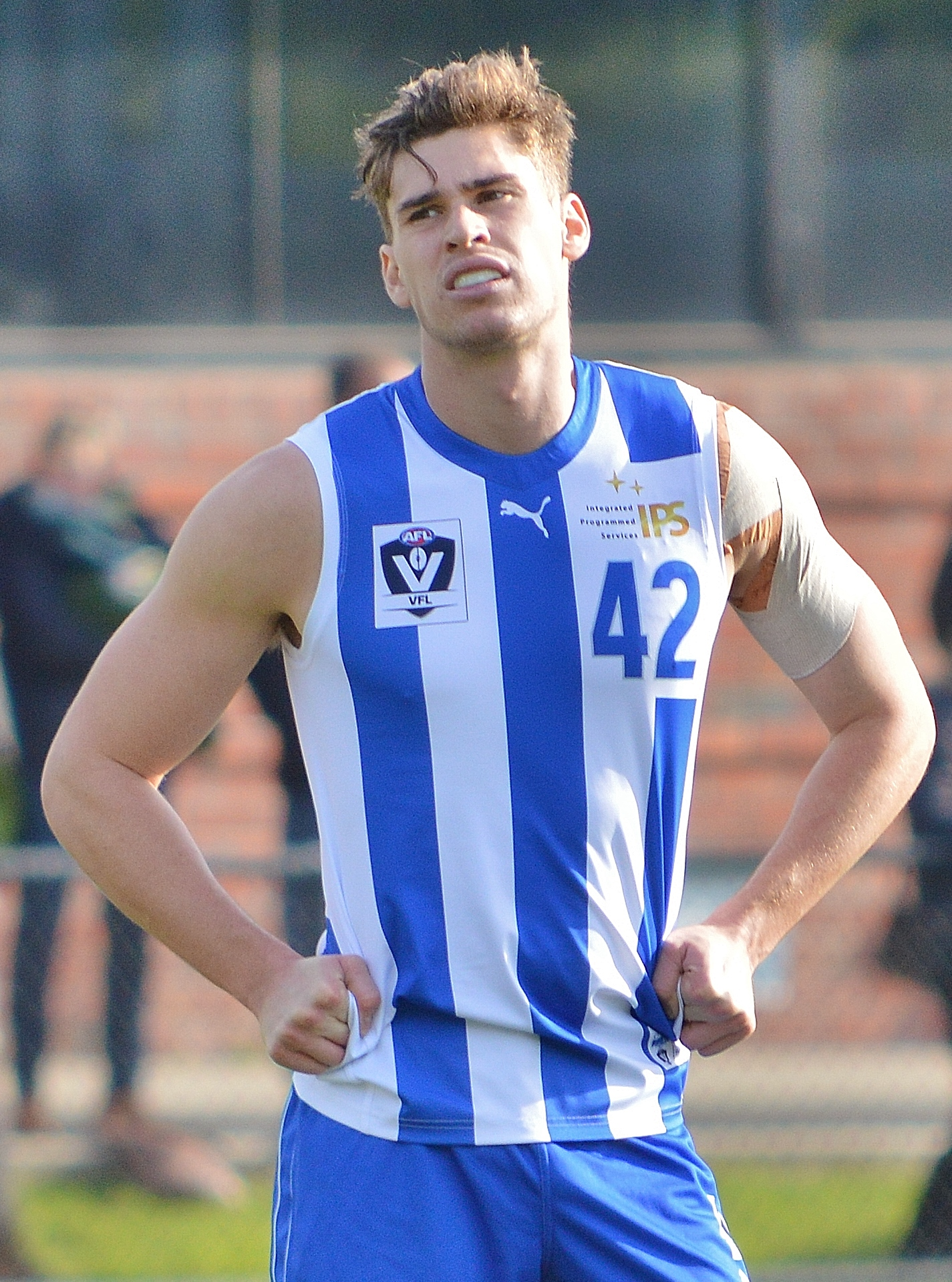
- Dawson with North Melbourne's VFL side in July 2022

Personal information
- Full name: Kallan Dawson
- Born: 22 July 1998 (age 28)
- Original team: Williamstown (VFL)
- Draft: No. 2, 2022 mid-season draft
- Debut: Round 20, 2022, North Melbourne vs. Essendon, at Docklands Stadium
- Height: 196 cm (6 ft 5 in)
- Position: Key defender

Playing career
Years	Club	Games (Goals)
2022–2025	North Melbourne	19 (1)

Kallan Dawson is a former professional Australian rules footballer who played for the North Melbourne in the Australian Football League (AFL).

== Early life ==
Dawson played junior football for the Western Jets in the Talent League. After going undrafted out of high school, he played amateur football for Williamstown CYMS and later in the Victorian Football League with the Williamstown Football Club.

== AFL career ==
Dawson was drafted by North Melbourne with the club's first selection and the second pick overall in the 2022 mid-season draft. He made his debut in round 20 of the same season.

Dawson played 19 games for North Melbourne across 3 and a half seasons, before being delisted at the end of the 2025 season.

== Statistics ==
Legend
G	Goals	K	Kicks	D	Disposals	T	Tackles
B	Behinds	H	Handballs	M	Marks

Season	Team	No.	Games	Totals							Averages (per game)							Votes
Season	Team	No.	Games	G	B	K	H	D	M	T	G	B	K	H	D	M	T	Votes
2022	North Melbourne	42	4	0	1	34	22	56	21	6	0.0	0.3	8.5	5.5	14.0	5.3	1.5	0
2023	North Melbourne	42	1	0	0	6	3	9	3	1	0.0	0.0	6.0	3.0	9.0	3.0	1.0	0
2024	North Melbourne	42	11	1	0	62	50	112	37	12	0.1	0.0	5.6	4.5	10.2	3.4	1.1	0
2025	North Melbourne	42	3	0	0	11	12	23	10	5	0.0	0.0	3.7	4.0	7.7	3.3	1.7	0
Career			19	1	1	113	87	200	71	24	0.1	0.1	5.9	4.6	10.5	3.7	1.3	0
