= Riley Hardeman =

Australian rules footballer

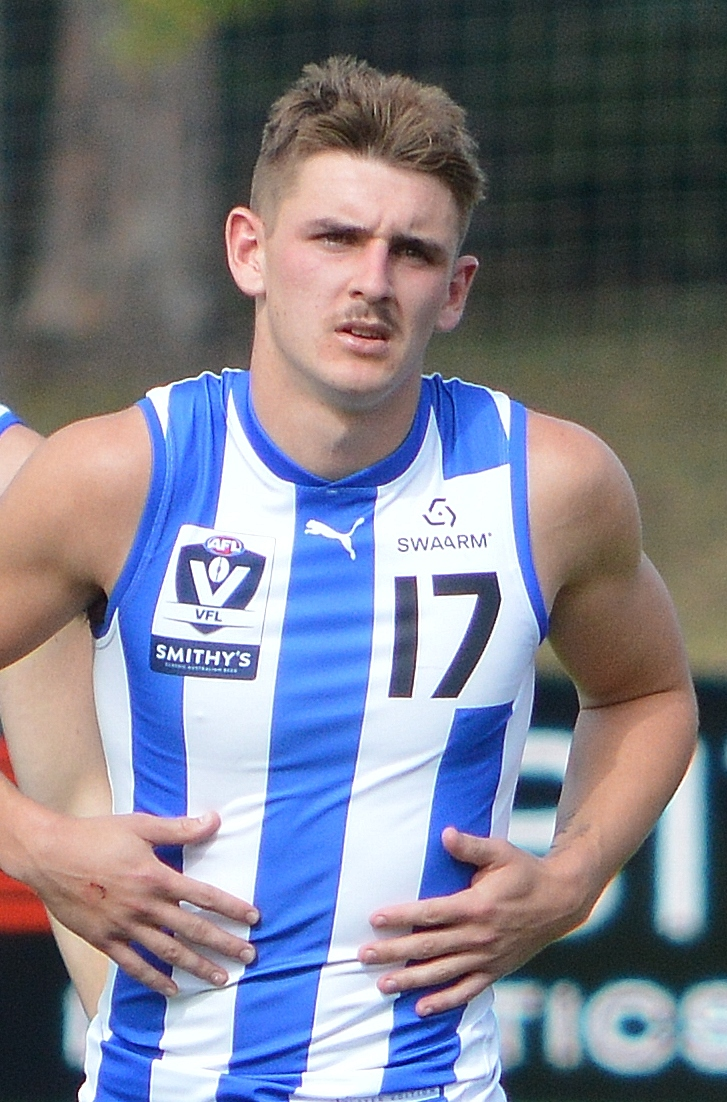
- Hardeman with North Melbourne's VFL side in April 2025

Personal information
- Born: 27 February 2005 (age 21)
- Original team: Caversham JFC/Swan Districts (WAFL)
- Draft: No. 23, 2023 national draft: North Melbourne
- Debut: Round 7, 2024, North Melbourne vs. Adelaide, at Bellerive Oval
- Height: 184 cm (6 ft 0 in)
- Weight: 75 kg (165 lb)
- Position: Defender

Club information
- Current club: North Melbourne
- Number: 17

Playing career^{1}
Years	Club	Games (Goals)
2024–	North Melbourne	25 (1)
- ^{1} Playing statistics correct to the end of round 22, 2026.

Riley Hardeman (born 27 February 2005) is a professional Australian rules footballer for the North Melbourne Football Club in the Australian Football League (AFL).

== AFL career ==
Hardeman was recruited by North Melbourne with the 23rd overall selection in the 2023 national draft.

Hardeman debuted for North Melbourne in round seven of the 2024 AFL season in a 57-point loss to Adelaide.

== Statistics ==
Updated to the end of round 22, 2026.

Legend
G	Goals	K	Kicks	D	Disposals	T	Tackles
B	Behinds	H	Handballs	M	Marks

Season	Team	No.	Games	Totals							Averages (per game)							Votes
Season	Team	No.	Games	G	B	K	H	D	M	T	G	B	K	H	D	M	T	Votes
2024	North Melbourne	17	3	0	0	21	9	30	9	6	0.0	0.0	7.0	3.0	10.0	3.0	2.0	0
2025	North Melbourne	17	17	0	0	147	74	221	56	16	0.0	0.0	8.6	4.4	13.0	3.3	0.9	0
2026	North Melbourne	17	5	1	0	43	15	58	17	3	0.2	0.0	8.6	3.0	11.6	3.4	0.6	0
Career			25	1	0	211	98	309	82	25	0.0	0.0	8.4	3.9	12.4	3.3	1.0	0
