= Dylan Stephens =

Australian football league player

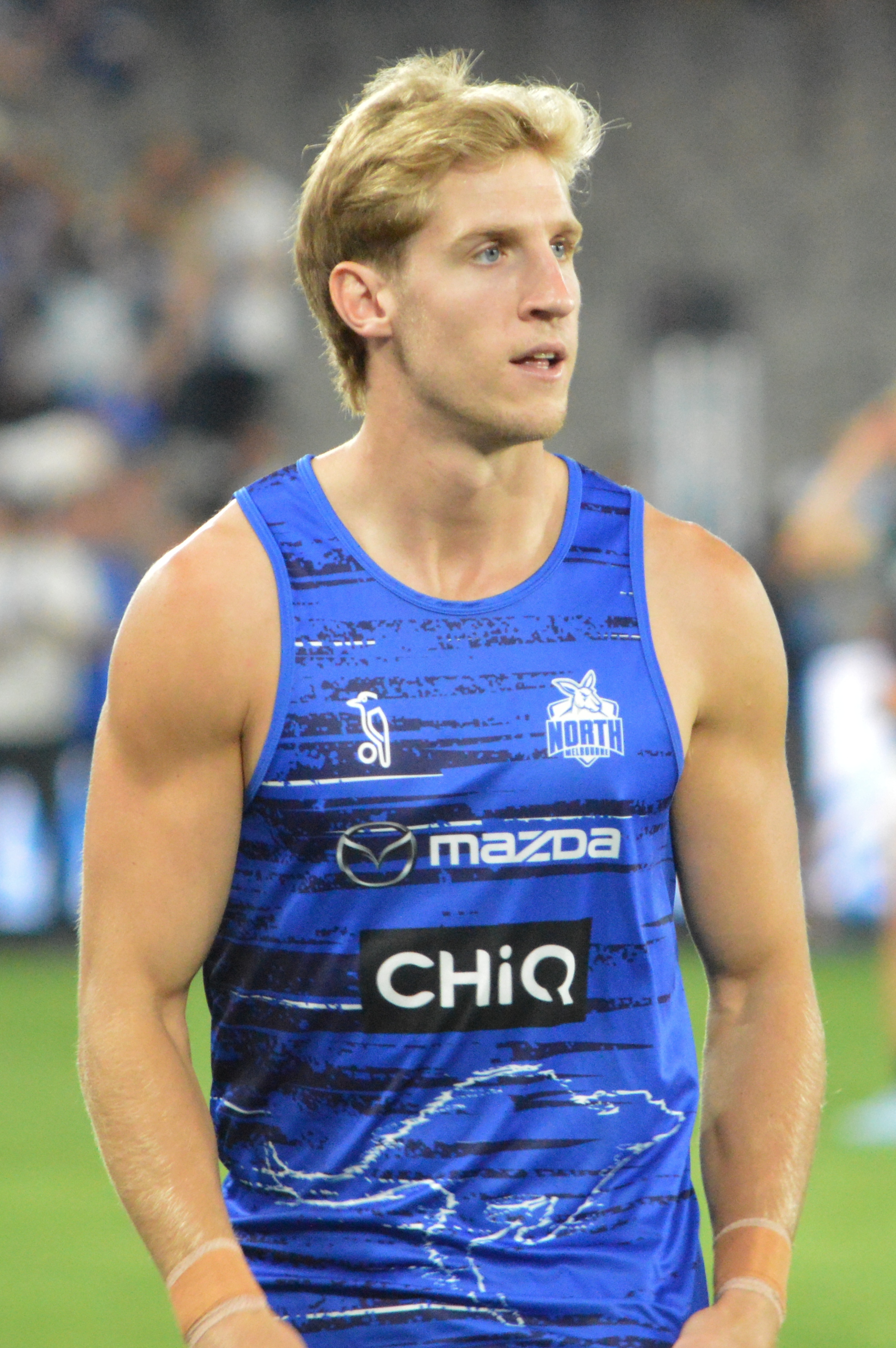
- Stephens with North Melbourne in March 2026

Personal information
- Born: 8 January 2001 (age 25); Mildura, Victoria
- Original team: Norwood (SANFL)
- Draft: No. 5, 2019 AFL draft, Sydney
- Debut: 12 July 2020, Sydney vs. Richmond, at The Gabba
- Height: 184 cm (6 ft 0 in)
- Weight: 79 kg (174 lb)
- Position: Midfielder

Club information
- Current club: North Melbourne
- Number: 15

Playing career^{1}
| Years | Club | Games (Goals) |
| 2020–2023 | Sydney | 43 (11) |
| 2024– | North Melbourne | 59 (10) |
| Total | | 100 (20) |
- ^{1} Playing statistics correct to the end of round 22, 2026.

Dylan Stephens (born 8 January 2001) is an Australian rules footballer who plays for the North Melbourne Football Club in the Australian Football League (AFL). He was initially recruited by the Sydney Swans with the fifth pick in the 2019 AFL draft.

== Early football ==
Stephens played junior football for his local club, Red Cliffs Football Club. He attended Red Cliffs Primary School and then Red Cliffs Secondary College. He later attended and played football for St Peter's College in Adelaide, while on a football scholarship. Stephens played for Norwood in the SANFL for the 2019 season, where he played 13 games and kicked six goals. Stephens also represented South Australia in the AFL Under 18 Championships, where he ended up winning the award for Most Valuable Player in the South Australian Side, as well as selection in the All-Australian Under 18 side.

== AFL career ==
Stephens debuted in the Swans' eight point loss to the Richmond Tigers in the 6th round of the 2020 AFL season, alongside teammate Chad Warner. On debut, Stephens collected 11 disposals, 5 marks and 4 tackles, and kicked a behind.

Stephens was in and out of the Swans through 2021 and the first half of 2022, before a consistent run of games through 2022 including being included in the team for the 2022 AFL Grand Final.

A contract extension signed in 2021 committed Stephens to the Swans until the end of 2023. Stephens played in the opening game of the 2023 season against the Gold Coast Suns, amassing 27 disposals. On 11 October 2023, Stephens was traded to North Melbourne.

== Statistics ==
Updated to the end of round 22, 2026.

Legend
| G | Goals | K | Kicks | D | Disposals | T | Tackles |
| B | Behinds | H | Handballs | M | Marks |

| Season | Team | No. | Games | Totals | | | | | | | Averages (per game) | | | | | | | Votes |
| Season | Team | No. | Games | G | B | K | H | D | M | T | G | B | K | H | D | M | T | Votes |
|---|---|---|---|---|---|---|---|---|---|---|---|---|---|---|---|---|---|---|
| 2020 (Note: The 2020 season was played with 17 home-and-away matches per team (down from 22) and 16-minute quarters with time on (down from 20-minute quarters with time on) due to the impact of the COVID-19 pandemic.) | Sydney | 3 | 8 | 2 | 3 | 68 | 32 | 100 | 27 | 27 | 0.3 | 0.4 | 8.5 | 4.0 | 12.5 | 3.4 | 3.4 | 0 |
| 2021 | Sydney | 3 | 7 | 1 | 1 | 30 | 29 | 59 | 20 | 8 | 0.1 | 0.1 | 4.3 | 4.1 | 8.4 | 2.9 | 1.1 | 0 |
| 2022 | Sydney | 3 | 15 | 5 | 2 | 171 | 67 | 238 | 63 | 38 | 0.3 | 0.1 | 11.4 | 4.5 | 15.9 | 4.2 | 2.5 | 0 |
| 2023 | Sydney | 3 | 13 | 3 | 3 | 113 | 63 | 176 | 37 | 32 | 0.2 | 0.2 | 8.7 | 4.8 | 13.5 | 2.8 | 2.5 | 0 |
| 2024 | North Melbourne | 15 | 16 | 0 | 1 | 134 | 70 | 204 | 43 | 23 | 0.0 | 0.1 | 8.4 | 4.4 | 12.8 | 2.7 | 1.4 | 0 |
| 2025 | North Melbourne | 15 | 22 | 6 | 6 | 206 | 179 | 385 | 103 | 26 | 0.3 | 0.3 | 9.4 | 8.1 | 17.5 | 4.7 | 1.2 | 0 |
| 2026 | North Melbourne | 15 | 21 | 4 | 10 | 257 | 166 | 423 | 109 | 35 | 0.2 | 0.5 | 12.2 | 7.9 | 20.1 | 5.2 | 1.7 | 0 |
| Career | | | 102 | 21 | 26 | 979 | 606 | 1585 | 402 | 189 | 0.2 | 0.3 | 9.6 | 5.9 | 15.5 | 3.9 | 1.9 | 0 |
