= Luke Davies-Uniacke =

Australian rules footballer

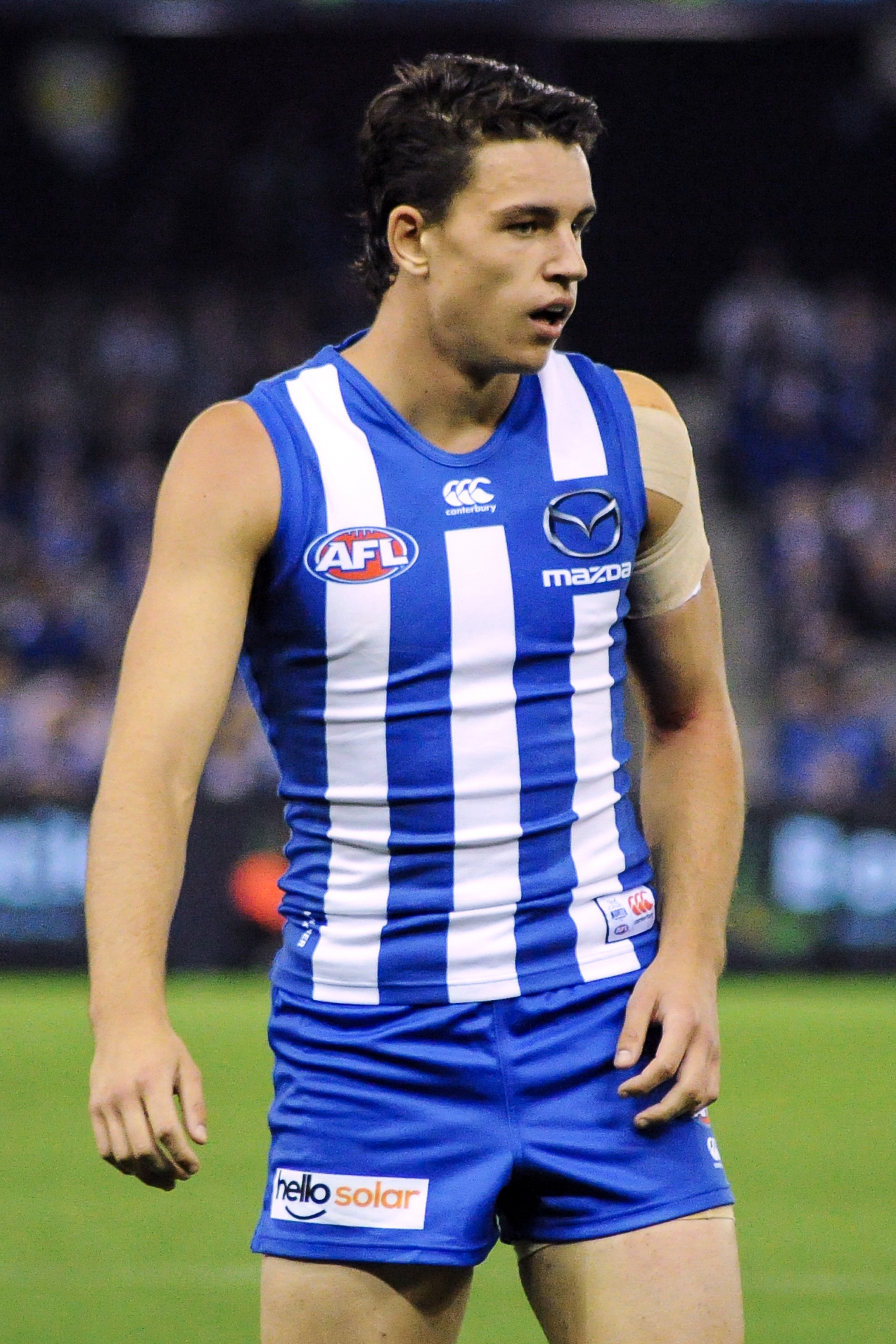
- Davies-Uniacke playing for North Melbourne in 2018

Personal information
- Full name: Luke Davies-Uniacke
- Nickname: LDU
- Born: 8 June 1999 (age 27)
- Original team: Dandenong Stingrays (TAC Cup)
- Draft: No. 4, 2017 national draft
- Debut: Round 1, 2018, North Melbourne vs. Gold Coast, at Cazaly's Stadium
- Height: 188 cm (6 ft 2 in)
- Weight: 85 kg (187 lb)
- Position: Midfielder

Club information
- Current club: North Melbourne
- Number: 9

Playing career^{1}
| Years | Club | Games (Goals) |
| 2018– | North Melbourne | 151 (56) |
- ^{1} Playing statistics correct to the end of round 22, 2026.

Career highlights
- Syd Barker Medal: 2024

Luke Davies-Uniacke (born 8 June 1999) is a professional Australian rules footballer playing for the North Melbourne Football Club in the Australian Football League (AFL). Davies-Uniacke won the Syd Barker Medal in 2024.

== Early life ==
Davies-Uniacke grew up in the Victorian seaside town of Rye with his Dad Pete, Mum Cath and sister Tara. Luke was a keen surfer and attended Padua College then Haileybury College in Melbourne. He was widely touted as a junior, with his game-breaking stoppage ability and skilful kicking evident from an early age. He was described by Haileybury coach Matthew Lloyd as "the best junior [he] had ever come across", and was touted as an early contender in the 2017 draft as a potential pick 1.

== AFL career ==
Davies-Uniacke was drafted by North Melbourne with its first selection and fourth overall in the 2017 national draft. He made his debut in the sixteen point loss to Gold Coast at Cazaly's Stadium in the opening round of the 2018 season.

Davies-Uniacke won North Melbourne's best and fairest award, the Syd Barker Medal, in the 2024 season.

== Statistics ==
Updated to the end of round 22, 2026.

Legend
| G | Goals | K | Kicks | D | Disposals | T | Tackles |
| B | Behinds | H | Handballs | M | Marks |

| Season | Team | No. | Games | Totals | | | | | | | Averages (per game) | | | | | | | Votes |
| Season | Team | No. | Games | G | B | K | H | D | M | T | G | B | K | H | D | M | T | Votes |
|---|---|---|---|---|---|---|---|---|---|---|---|---|---|---|---|---|---|---|
| 2018 | North Melbourne | 9 | 7 | 1 | 1 | 37 | 36 | 73 | 13 | 17 | 0.1 | 0.1 | 5.3 | 5.1 | 10.4 | 1.9 | 2.4 | 0 |
| 2019 | North Melbourne | 9 | 14 | 4 | 5 | 102 | 106 | 208 | 39 | 30 | 0.3 | 0.4 | 7.3 | 7.6 | 14.9 | 2.8 | 2.1 | 0 |
| 2020 (Note: The 2020 season was played with 17 home-and-away matches per team (down from 22) and 16-minute quarters with time on (down from 20-minute quarters with time on) due to the impact of the COVID-19 pandemic.) | North Melbourne | 9 | 9 | 2 | 0 | 73 | 83 | 156 | 19 | 21 | 0.2 | 0.0 | 8.1 | 9.2 | 17.3 | 2.1 | 2.3 | 2 |
| 2021 | North Melbourne | 9 | 20 | 6 | 12 | 229 | 211 | 440 | 97 | 64 | 0.3 | 0.6 | 11.5 | 10.6 | 22.0 | 4.9 | 3.2 | 4 |
| 2022 | North Melbourne | 9 | 21 | 9 | 7 | 267 | 255 | 522 | 90 | 92 | 0.4 | 0.3 | 12.7 | 12.1 | 24.9 | 4.3 | 4.4 | 8 |
| 2023 | North Melbourne | 9 | 14 | 8 | 6 | 175 | 208 | 383 | 52 | 63 | 0.6 | 0.4 | 12.5 | 14.9 | 27.4 | 3.7 | 4.5 | 13 |
| 2024 | North Melbourne | 9 | 23 | 11 | 4 | 316 | 322 | 638 | 85 | 89 | 0.5 | 0.2 | 13.7 | 14.0 | 27.7 | 3.7 | 3.9 | 18 |
| 2025 | North Melbourne | 9 | 22 | 8 | 9 | 257 | 287 | 544 | 82 | 91 | 0.4 | 0.4 | 11.7 | 13.0 | 24.7 | 3.7 | 4.1 | 11 |
| 2026 | North Melbourne | 9 | 21 | 7 | 4 | 253 | 278 | 531 | 81 | 104 | 0.3 | 0.2 | 12.0 | 13.2 | 25.3 | 3.9 | 5.0 | 0 |
| Career | | | 151 | 56 | 48 | 1709 | 1786 | 3495 | 558 | 571 | 0.4 | 0.3 | 11.3 | 11.8 | 23.1 | 3.7 | 3.8 | 56 |

== Honours and achievements ==
- Syd Barker Medal: 2024
