= Tristan Xerri =

Australian rules football player (born 1999)

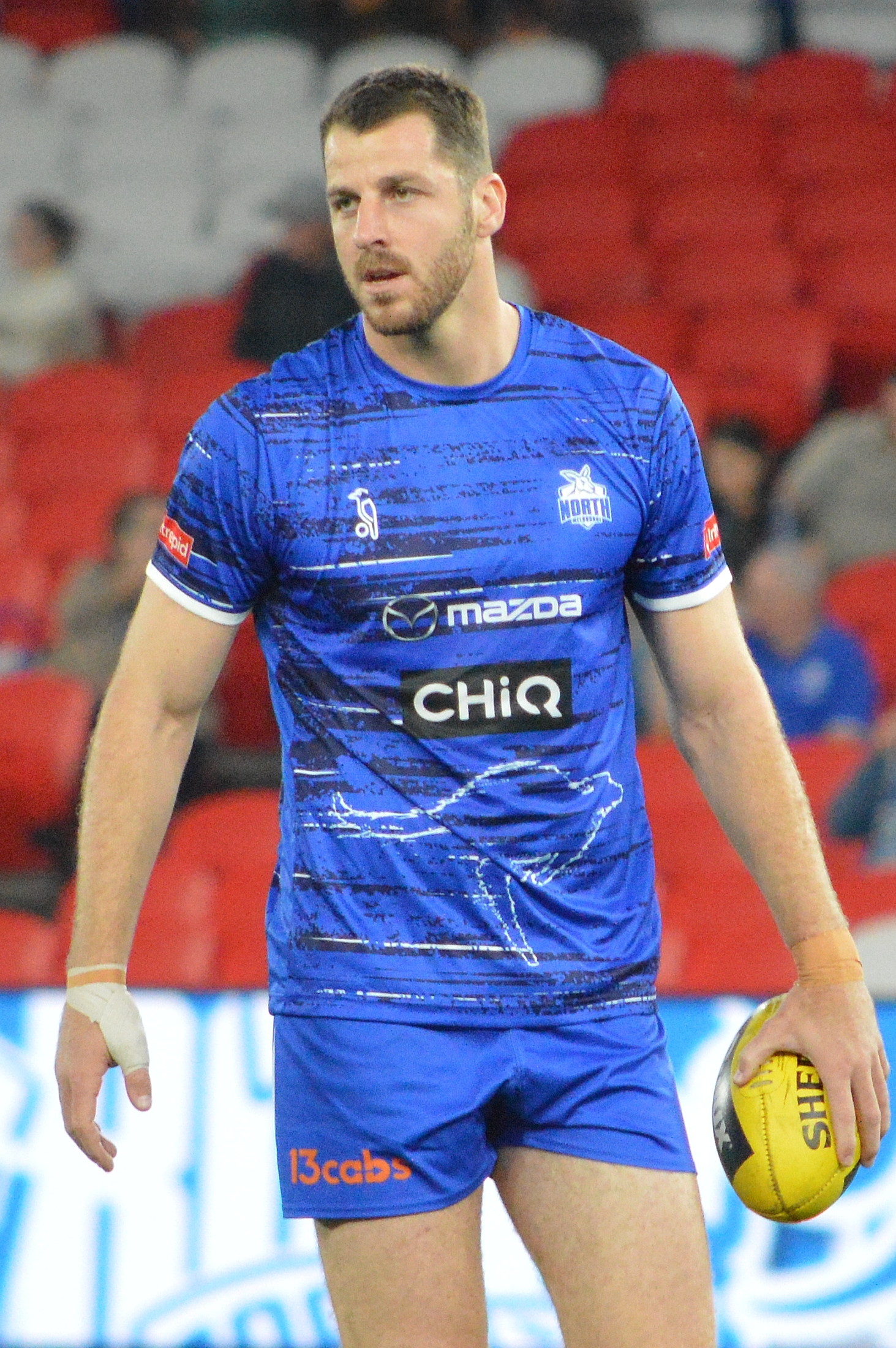
- Xerri in March 2026

Personal information
- Nicknames: Big X, X Factor, X, Helmet
- Born: 15 March 1999 (age 27); Caroline Springs, Victoria
- Draft: No. 72, 2017 AFL draft, North Melbourne
- Debut: 28 June 2020, North Melbourne vs. Hawthorn, at Marvel Stadium
- Height: 202 cm (6 ft 8 in)
- Weight: 105 kg (231 lb)
- Position: Ruck

Club information
- Current club: North Melbourne
- Number: 38

Playing career^{1}
Years	Club	Games (Goals)
2018–	North Melbourne	95 (33)

Representative team honours^{2}
Years	Team	Games (Goals)
2026–	Victoria	1 (1)
- ^{1} Playing statistics correct to the end of the 2026 season.^{2} Representative statistics correct as of 2026.

Career highlights
- Syd Barker Medal: 2025

Tristan Xerri (pron. /ˈʃɛri/, "sherry"; born 15 March 1999) is an Australian rules footballer who plays for the North Melbourne Football Club in the Australian Football League (AFL). He was recruited with the 72nd draft pick in the 2017 AFL draft. Xerri is the only player in VFL/AFL history whose surname starts with the letter X.

== Early Football ==
Xerri played for his school side at Lakeview Senior College. He also played for the Caroline Springs Football Club, and later for the Western Jets in the NAB League.

== AFL career ==
A lifelong North Melbourne supporter, Xerri debuted in North Melbourne's four-point loss against Hawthorn in the fourth round of the 2020 AFL season. He kicked one goal, had 5 disposals and 3 tackles. In September 2020, Xerri signed a new two-year contract, keeping him with North Melbourne until 2022. On 6 October 2021, Xerri requested a trade to St Kilda. The trade failed to eventuate, and Xerri remained at North Melbourne. In 2022, Xerri signed a three-year contract extension. He became North's leading ruck in 2023, but he missed much of the season due to an ankle injury in Round One.

In early 2024, Xerri injured his face in a training accident and had a plate inserted. Later that year he signed a contract extension, keeping him at North Melbourne until at least the end of 2029.

Xerri had a breakout season in 2024, resulting in him being named in the 2024 All-Australian squad.

Xerri had another strong season in 2025 and was rewarded with a contract extension with the Kangaroos to the end of 2031. Xerri capped off a highly successful season by winning his first Syd Barker Medal, North Melbourne's Best and Fairest award, finishing as joint winner alongside Harry Sheezel.

== Statistics ==
Updated to the end of round 22, 2026.

Legend
G	Goals	K	Kicks	D	Disposals	T	Tackles
B	Behinds	H	Handballs	M	Marks	H/O	Hit-outs

Season	Team	No.	Games	Totals								Averages (per game)								Votes
Season	Team	No.	Games	G	B	K	H	D	M	T	H/O	G	B	K	H	D	M	T	H/O	Votes
2018	North Melbourne	38	0	—	—	—	—	—	—	—	—	—	—	—	—	—	—	—	—	0
2019	North Melbourne	38	0	—	—	—	—	—	—	—	—	—	—	—	—	—	—	—	—	0
2020 (Note: The 2020 season was played with 17 home-and-away matches per team (down from 22) and 16-minute quarters with time on (down from 20-minute quarters with time on) due to the impact of the COVID-19 pandemic.)	North Melbourne	38	4	4	0	13	6	19	5	8	9	1.0	0.0	3.3	1.5	4.8	1.3	2.0	2.3	0
2021	North Melbourne	38	8	1	2	26	34	60	14	17	59	0.1	0.3	3.3	4.3	7.5	1.8	2.1	7.4	0
2022	North Melbourne	38	12	5	2	50	70	120	27	42	262	0.4	0.2	4.2	5.8	10.0	2.3	3.5	21.8	0
2023	North Melbourne	38	9	3	0	30	73	103	9	26	229	0.3	0.0	3.3	8.1	11.4	1.0	2.9	25.4	0
2024	North Melbourne	38	23	8	3	194	218	412	66	173	794	0.3	0.1	8.4	9.5	17.9	2.9	7.5	34.5	1
2025	North Melbourne	38	20	4	0	123	222	345	33	132	699	0.2	0.0	6.2	11.1	17.3	1.7	6.6	35.0	7
2026	North Melbourne	38	17	7	5	120	179	299	49	98	360	0.4	0.3	7.1	10.5	17.6	2.9	5.8	21.2	0
Career			93	32	12	556	802	1358	203	496	2412	0.3	0.1	6.0	8.6	14.6	2.2	5.3	25.9	8
