= Josh Goater =

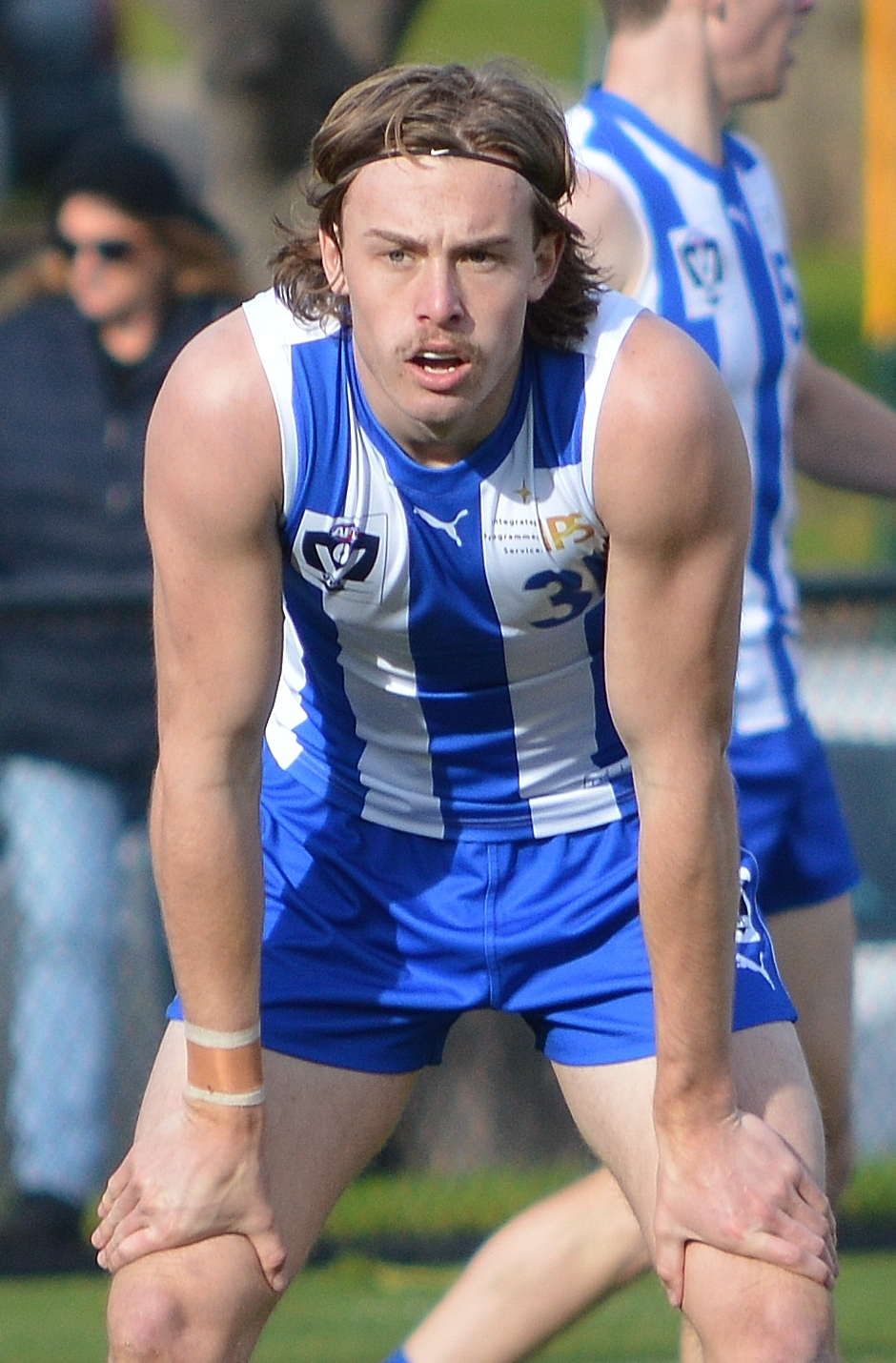
- Goater in February 2023

Personal information
- Full name: Joshua Goater
- Born: 2 June 2003 (age 23)
- Original team: Calder Cannons
- Draft: No. 22, 2021 national draft
- Debut: 20 August 2022, North Melbourne vs. Gold Coast, at Marvel Stadium
- Height: 190 cm (6 ft 3 in)
- Weight: 87 kg (192 lb)
- Position: Midfielder/Defender

Club information
- Current club: Hawthorn

Playing career^{1}
Years	Club	Games (Goals)
2022–2026	North Melbourne	18 (0)
2027–	Hawthorn	0 (0)
Total		18 (0)
- ^{1} Playing statistics correct to the end of 2026.

Joshua Goater is an Australian rules footballer who plays for the Hawthorn Football Club in the Australian Football League, having previously played for North Melbourne.

== Early life ==
Goater's father David was also a footballer, playing for East Perth Football Club in the WAFL. Goater was a North Melbourne supporter in childhood. In 2021, he spent four weeks with Essendon's VFL side, playing one game against the Frankston Football Club, during which he kicked a goal.

== AFL career ==
Goater was draft by North Melbourne with pick 22 in the 2021 AFL draft. Goater made his debut in the last game of the 2022 season.

Goater has impressed by displaying traits of a athletic versatile defender. His career has been impacted by several injury setbacks during his five years with the Kangaroos. He ruptured his achilles tendon in round 1 2024 and it took two years of recovery for him to return to top grade.

Coming out of contract North offered him a one year deal. Hawthorn then offered two years. Goater requested and received a trade to Hawthorn at the end of 2026.

== Statistics ==
Updated to the end of 2026.

Legend
G	Goals	K	Kicks	D	Disposals	T	Tackles
B	Behinds	H	Handballs	M	Marks

Season	Team	No.	Games	Totals							Averages (per game)							Votes
Season	Team	No.	Games	G	B	K	H	D	M	T	G	B	K	H	D	M	T	Votes
2022	North Melbourne	31	1	0	1	12	9	21	5	3	0.0	1.0	12.0	9.0	21.0	5.0	3.0	0
2023	North Melbourne	31	10	0	1	79	61	140	46	13	0.0	0.1	7.9	6.1	14.0	4.6	1.3	0
2024	North Melbourne	31	1	0	0	7	3	10	2	1	0.0	0.0	7.0	3.0	10.0	2.0	1.0	0
2026	North Melbourne	31	6	0	2	46	46	92	29	5	0.0	0.3	7.7	7.7	15.3	4.8	0.8	0
Career			18	0	4	144	119	263	82	22	0.0	0.2	8.0	6.6	14.6	4.6	1.2	0
