= List of current AFL team squads =

The following is a list of current AFL team squads for the 2026 AFL season.

== Adelaide ==
Adelaide Football Club · AFL personnel
Senior list		Rookie list	Coaching staff
1 Chayce Jones; 2 Ben Keays (vc); 3 Sam Berry; 4 Callum Ah Chee; 5 Sid Draper; 6 Daniel Curtin; 7 Riley Thilthorpe; 8 Josh Rachele; 9 Nick Murray; 10 Luke Pedlar; 11 Charlie Edwards; 12 Jordan Dawson (c); 13 Taylor Walker; 14 Jake Soligo; 15 Brayden Cook; 16 Max Michalanney; 19 Zac Taylor; 20 Mitch Hinge; 21 Hugh Bond	22 Oscar Ryan; 23 Izak Rankine; 24 Josh Worrell; 25 James Peatling; 26 Mitchell Marsh; 27 Luke Nankervis; 28 Alex Neal-Bullen (vc); 29 Rory Laird; 30 Wayne Milera; 31 Billy Dowling; 32 Darcy Fogarty; 34 Archie Ludowyke; 36 Finnbar Maley; 38 Lachlan Sholl; 41 Jordon Butts; 43 Reilly O'Brien; 44 Isaac Cumming; 48 Mark Keane	17 Tyler Welsh; 33 Indy Cotton (B); 35 James Borlase; 39 Toby Murray; 42 Lachlan McAndrew	Head coach: Matthew Nicks; Assistant coaches: Scott Burns (senior assistant/forward line); Jack Hombsch (back line); Nathan van Berlo (midfield); Sam Baulderstone (ruck); Chelsea Randall (development); Andrew McPherson (development); Legend: (c) Captain(s); (vc) Vice-captain(s); italics – Inactive; Long-term injury; (B) Category B rookie; Updated: 30 March 2026; Source(s):

== Brisbane Lions ==
Brisbane Lions · AFL personnel
Senior list		Rookie list	Coaching staff
1 Kai Lohmann; 2 Sam Draper; 3 Jaspa Fletcher; 4 Oscar Allen; 5 Josh Dunkley (vc); 6 Hugh McCluggage (vc); 7 Jarrod Berry; 8 Will Ashcroft; 9 Lachie Neale; 10 Levi Ashcroft; 12 Tom Doedee; 13 Logan Morris; 14 Daniel Annable; 15 Dayne Zorko; 16 Cameron Rayner; 18 Keidean Coleman; 19 Luke Lloyd; 20 Sam Marshall; 21 Zane Zakostelsky	22 Ty Gallop; 23 Charlie Cameron; 24 Koby Evans; 25 Henry Smith; 26 Conor McKenna; 27 Darcy Gardiner; 29 James Tunstill; 30 Eric Hipwood; 31 Harris Andrews (c); 32 Darcy Fort; 33 Zac Bailey; 34 Shadeau Brain; 35 Ryan Lester; 36 Reece Torrent; 37 Cody Curtin; 40 Jack Payne; 42 Tai Hayes; 43 Noah Answerth; 44 Darcy Wilmot	11 Lincoln McCarthy; 17 Luke Beecken; 28 Will McLachlan; 38 Bruce Reville; 39 Ben Murphy (B); 41 Darragh Joyce	Head coach: Chris Fagan; Assistant coaches: Dale Morris (back line); Cameron Bruce (midfield); Daniel Lloyd (forward line); Scott Thompson (development); Liam Jones (development); Legend: (c) Captain(s); (vc) Vice-captain(s); italics – Inactive; Long-term injury; (B) Category B rookie; Updated: 30 March 2026; Source(s):

== Carlton ==
Carlton Football Club · AFL personnel
Senior list		Rookie list	Coaching staff
2 Lachlan Cowan; 3 Jesse Motlop; 4 Oliver Hollands; 5 Adam Cerra; 6 Zac Williams; 7 Jagga Smith; 8 Lachie Fogarty; 9 Patrick Cripps (c); 10 Harry McKay; 11 Mitch McGovern; 12 Ben Ainsworth; 13 Blake Acres; 14 Ollie Florent; 15 Billy Wilson; 16 Ben Camporeale; 17 Brodie Kemp; 18 Sam Walsh (vc); 19 Will Hayward; 21 Lucas Camporeale; 22 Harry O'Farrell; 23 Jacob Weitering (vc)	24 Nic Newman; 25 Liam Reidy; 26 Nick Haynes; 27 Marc Pittonet; 29 George Hewett; 30 Jack Ison; 31 Campbell Chesser; 33 Lewis Young; 35 Harry Dean; 37 Jordan Boyd; 39 Talor Byrne; 40 Hudson O'Keeffe; 42 Adam Saad; 43 Ashton Moir; 46 Matt Cottrell	20 Elijah Hollands; 28 Harry Charleson; 32 Matt Carroll; 34 Rob Monahan (B); 36 Cooper Lord; 41 Matt Duffy (B); 44 Francis Evans; 45 Flynn Young; 47 Wade Derksen	Head coach: Michael Voss; Assistant coaches: Ashley Hansen (back line); Leigh Adams (midfield); Tim Clarke (stoppages/structure); Josh Fraser (forward line); Matthew Kreuzer (ruck); Damian Truslove (development); Torin Baker (development); Ash Close (development); Jacob Townsend (development); Legend: (c) Captain(s); (vc) Vice-captain(s); italics – Inactive; Long-term injury; (B) Category B rookie; Updated: 30 March 2026; Source(s):

== Collingwood ==
Collingwood Football Club · AFL personnel
Senior list		Rookie list	Coaching staff
1 Patrick Lipinski; 2 Jordan De Goey; 3 Isaac Quaynor; 4 Brayden Maynard (vc); 5 Jamie Elliott; 7 Josh Daicos; 8 Lachie Schultz; 9 Dan Houston; 10 Scott Pendlebury; 11 Daniel McStay; 12 Harry Perryman; 13 Harry DeMattia; 14 Darcy Cameron; 16 Ed Allan; 17 Billy Frampton; 18 Tyan Prindable; 19 Tew Jiath; 21 Oscar Steene; 22 Steele Sidebottom; 23 Bobby Hill; 24 Jakob Ryan	25 Jack Crisp; 26 Reef McInnes; 27 Joel Cochran; 28 Tim Membrey; 29 Charlie West; 30 Darcy Moore (c); 31 Beau McCreery; 32 Sam Swadling; 34 Jack Buller; 35 Nick Daicos (vc); 36 Harvey Harrison; 37 Zac McCarthy; 38 Jeremy Howe; 39 Will Hayes; 41 Angus Anderson	15 Wil Parker (B); 20 Iliro Smit; 33 Lachie Sullivan; 40 Noah Howes; 43 Jai Saxena; 44 Ned Long; 45 Roan Steele	Head coach: Craig McRae; Assistant coaches: Hayden Skipworth (senior assistant); Jordan Roughead (back line); Matthew Boyd (midfield); Tyson Goldsack (forward line); Greg Stafford (ruck); Matthew Lokan (development); Chloe McMillan (development); Dyson Heppell (development); Nathan Murphy (development); Legend: (c) Captain(s); (vc) Vice-captain(s); italics – Inactive; Long-term injury; (B) Category B rookie; Updated: 30 March 2026; Source(s):

== Essendon ==
Essendon Football Club · AFL personnel
Senior list		Rookie list	Coaching staff
1 Andrew McGrath (c); 2 Jacob Farrow; 3 Darcy Parish; 4 Kyle Langford; 5 Elijah Tsatas; 6 Jye Caldwell; 7 Zach Merrett; 8 Brayden Fiorini; 9 Sullivan Robey; 10 Isaac Kako; 11 Jade Gresham; 13 Nik Cox; 14 Jordan Ridley; 15 Dyson Sharp; 16 Archie Perkins; 17 Vigo Visentini; 18 Lewis Hayes; 19 Kayle Gerreyn; 20 Peter Wright	21 Archie Roberts; 22 Sam Durham; 23 Harrison Jones; 24 Nick Bryan; 25 Jaxon Prior; 27 Mason Redman; 28 Xavier Duursma; 29 Max Kondogiannis; 30 Nate Caddy; 31 Zach Reid; 32 Ben McKay; 33 Hussien El Achkar; 35 Matt Guelfi; 36 Angus Clarke; 37 Nic Martin; 38 Rhys Unwin; 40 Zak Johnson	12 Will Setterfield; 26 Archer May; 39 Cillian Bourke (B); 41 Saad El-Hawli; 42 Jayden Nguyen (B); 44 Archer Day-Wicks; 45 Tom Edwards; 46 Lachlan Blakiston; 48 Liam McMahon	Head coach: Brad Scott; Assistant coaches: Dean Solomon (back line); Ben Jacobs (midfield); Brent Stanton (stoppages); Cam Roberts (forward line); Todd Goldstein (ruck); Michael Hurley (development); Toby McLean (development); Legend: (c) Captain(s); (vc) Vice-captain(s); italics – Inactive; Long-term injury; (B) Category B rookie; Updated: 30 March 2026; Source(s):

== Fremantle ==
Fremantle Football Club · AFL personnel
Senior list		Rookie list	Coaching staff
1 Sam Sturt; 2 Jaeger O'Meara; 3 Caleb Serong (vc); 4 Sean Darcy; 5 Heath Chapman; 6 Jordan Clark; 8 Andrew Brayshaw (vc); 9 Luke Jackson; 10 Shai Bolton; 11 Tobyn Murray; 12 Hugh Davies; 13 Luke Ryan; 14 Jeremy Sharp; 15 Adam Sweid; 16 Murphy Reid; 17 Judd McVee; 21 Oscar McDonald; 22 Charlie Nicholls; 23 Karl Worner; 24 Jye Amiss	25 Alex Pearce (c); 26 Hayden Young; 28 Neil Erasmus; 29 Cooper Simpson; 30 Nathan O'Driscoll; 31 Brandon Walker; 32 Michael Frederick; 33 Ollie Murphy; 34 Corey Wagner; 35 Josh Treacy; 36 Brennan Cox; 37 Josh Draper; 38 Jaren Carr; 39 Sam Switkowski; 41 Bailey Banfield; 44 Matthew Johnson	18 Mason Cox; 19 Leon Kickett; 20 Patrick Voss; 27 Toby Whan (B); 40 Ryda Luke (B); 42 Aiden Riddle; 43 Isaiah Dudley; 45 Chris Scerri	Head coach: Justin Longmuir; Assistant coaches: Jade Rawlings (back line); Joel Corey (midfield); Harry Garland (stoppages); Jaymie Graham (forward line); Sam Naismith (ruck); Tendai Mzungu (development); Todd Curley (development); Chris Mayne (development); Legend: (c) Captain(s); (vc) Vice-captain(s); italics – Inactive; Long-term injury; (B) Category B rookie; Updated: 30 March 2026; Source(s):

== Geelong ==
Geelong Football Club · AFL personnel
Senior list		Rookie list	Coaching staff
1 Rhys Stanley; 2 Jay Polkinghorne; 3 Bailey Smith; 4 Tanner Bruhn; 5 Jeremy Cameron; 6 Toby Conway; 7 Shaun Mannagh; 8 Jake Kolodjashnij; 9 Max Holmes; 10 Mitch Knevitt; 11 Mitch Edwards; 12 Jack Bowes; 13 Jhye Clark; 14 Connor O'Sullivan; 16 Sam De Koning; 17 Lawson Humphries; 18 Tyson Stengle; 19 Jack Martin; 20 Jacob Molier	21 Oliver Wiltshire; 22 Hunter Holmes; 23 Lennox Hofmann; 24 Jed Bews; 26 Harley Barker; 28 Ollie Dempsey; 29 James Worpel; 30 Tom Atkins; 32 Gryan Miers; 33 Shannon Neale; 34 Oisín Mullin; 35 Patrick Dangerfield (c); 36 Oliver Henry; 38 Jack Henry; 39 Zach Guthrie; 42 Mark O'Connor; 44 Tom Stewart (vc); 45 Brad Close; 46 Mark Blicavs	15 George Stevens; 25 Jesse Mellor (B); 27 Nick Driscoll; 31 Keighton Matofai-Forbes; 37 Joe Pike; 41 Cillian Burke (B)	Head coach: Chris Scott; Assistant coaches: James Kelly (assistant); Nathan Buckley (assistant); James Rahilly (assistant); Legend: (c) Captain(s); (vc) Vice-captain(s); italics – Inactive; Long-term injury; (B) Category B rookie; Updated: 30 March 2026; Source(s):

== Gold Coast ==
Gold Coast Suns · AFL personnel
Senior list		Rookie list	Coaching staff
1 Mac Andrew; 2 John Noble; 3 Christian Petracca; 4 Jed Walter; 5 Alex Davies; 6 Bodhi Uwland; 7 Nick Holman; 8 Leo Lombard; 9 Jamarra Ugle-Hagan; 10 Charlie Ballard; 11 Touk Miller (vc); 12 Elliott Himmelberg; 14 Lachie Weller; 15 Noah Anderson (c); 17 Daniel Rioli; 18 Matt Rowell; 19 Bailey Humphrey; 20 Ethan Read; 22 Ben Long	23 Ned Moyle; 25 Sam Collins (vc); 26 Will Graham; 27 Wil Powell; 28 Jarrod Witts; 29 Jake Rogers; 30 Dylan Patterson; 31 Cooper Bell; 32 Zeke Uwland; 33 Sam Clohesy; 34 Ben King; 35 Jai Murray; 38 Beau Addinsall; 40 Joel Jeffrey; 41 Avery Thomas; 43 Koby Coulson; 46 Caleb Graham; 50 Jy Farrar	36 Zak Evans (B); 37 Max Knobel; 39 Lachie Gulbin (B); 42 Asher Eastham; 44 Ben Jepson; 45 Caleb Lewis; 48 Oscar Adams	Head coach: Damien Hardwick; Assistant coaches: Josh Drummond (back line); Shaun Grigg (midfield); Brad Miller (forward line); Richard Douglas (development); Hugh Greenwood (development); Legend: (c) Captain(s); (vc) Vice-captain(s); italics – Inactive; Long-term injury; (B) Category B rookie; Updated: 30 March 2026; Source(s):

== Greater Western Sydney ==
Greater Western Sydney Giants · AFL personnel
Senior list		Rookie list	Coaching staff
1 Harvey Thomas; 2 Darcy Jones; 3 Stephen Coniglio; 4 Toby Greene (c); 5 Aaron Cadman; 6 Lachie Whitfield; 7 Lachie Ash; 9 Ryan Angwin; 10 Clayton Oliver; 11 Phoenix Gothard; 12 Tom Green (vc); 13 Oliver Hannaford; 14 Toby Bedford; 15 Sam Taylor; 16 Brent Daniels; 17 Finn Callaghan; 19 Harrison Oliver; 20 Jake Stringer; 21 Leek Aleer	22 Josh Kelly; 23 Jesse Hogan; 24 Harry Rowston; 26 Jake Riccardi; 27 Harry Himmelberg; 28 Jack Ough; 29 Cody Angove; 30 James Leake; 31 Toby McMullin; 32 Kieren Briggs; 33 Xavier O'Halloran; 34 Oskar Taylor; 35 Max Gruzewski; 36 Logan Smith; 37 Joe Fonti; 39 Connor Idun (vc); 44 Jack Buckley (vc); 45 Finnegan Davis; 46 Callum Brown	18 Conor Stone; 25 Jayden Laverde; 38 Josaia Delana (B); 41 Nick Madden; 42 Nathan Wardius (B); 43 Riley Hamilton (B)	Head coach: Adam Kingsley; Assistant coaches: Ben Hart (back line); Craig Jennings (midfield/transition); Wayne Cripps (midfield/stoppage); Brett Montgomery (forward line/team defence); Shane Mumford (ruck); Alicia Eva (development); Trent Dennis-Lane (development); Legend: (c) Captain(s); (vc) Vice-captain(s); italics – Inactive; Long-term injury; (B) Category B rookie; Updated: 30 March 2026; Source(s):

== Hawthorn ==
Hawthorn Football Club · AFL personnel
Senior list		Rookie list	Coaching staff
1 Harry Morrison; 2 Mitchell Lewis; 3 Jai Newcombe (c); 4 Jarman Impey; 5 Nick Watson; 6 James Sicily (c); 7 Ned Reeves; 8 Dylan Moore; 9 Connor Macdonald; 10 Karl Amon; 11 Conor Nash; 12 Will Day; 13 Calsher Dear; 14 Jack Scrimshaw; 15 Blake Hardwick; 16 Massimo D'Ambrosio; 17 Lloyd Meek; 18 Mabior Chol; 19 Jack Gunston	20 Finn Maginness; 21 Noah Mraz; 22 Cameron Nairn; 23 Josh Weddle; 24 Josh Battle; 25 Josh Ward; 26 Bodie Ryan; 27 Will McCabe; 28 Cameron Mackenzie; 29 Aidan Schubert; 30 Sam Butler; 31 Matthew LeRay; 32 Cody Anderson; 33 Jack Ginnivan; 34 Jack Dalton; 36 James Blanck; 37 Tom Barrass; 42 Bailey Macdonald; 44 Henry Hustwaite	35 Ollie Greeves; 38 Max Ramsden; 39 Flynn Perez; 41 Matt Hill (B); 43 Jaime Uhr-Henry (B)	Head coach: Sam Mitchell; Assistant coaches: Kade Simpson (back line); David Mackay (midfield); Adrian Hickmott (forward line); David Hale (structure/opposition); David Mirra (development); Jason Williams (development); Jason Johannisen (development); Legend: (c) Captain(s); (vc) Vice-captain(s); italics – Inactive; Long-term injury; (B) Category B rookie; Updated: 30 March 2026; Source(s):

== Melbourne ==
Melbourne Football Club · AFL personnel
Senior list		Rookie list	Coaching staff
2 Jacob van Rooyen; 3 Christian Salem; 4 Harvey Langford; 5 Xavier Lindsay; 6 Caleb Windsor; 7 Jack Viney (vc); 8 Jake Lever; 9 Jack Steele; 10 Daniel Turner; 11 Max Gawn (c); 12 Koltyn Tholstrup; 14 Changkuoth Jiath; 15 Ed Langdon; 16 Bailey Laurie; 17 Jake Bowey; 18 Jake Melksham; 19 Xavier Taylor; 20 Thomas Matthews	21 Matthew Jefferson; 22 Blake Howes; 23 Shane McAdam; 24 Trent Rivers; 25 Tom McDonald; 26 Jed Adams; 27 Max Heath; 28 Brody Mihocek; 29 Tom Campbell; 30 Harry Sharp; 31 Bayley Fritsch; 32 Tom Sparrow; 33 Latrelle Pickett; 35 Harrison Petty; 36 Kysaiah Pickett; 37 Kade Chandler; 42 Aidan Johnson	13 Jai Culley; 34 Kalani White; 39 Ricky Mentha Jr. (B); 38 Oscar Berry (B); 40 Riley Onley; 41 Paddy Cross; 43 Jack Henderson; 44 Luker Kentfield; 45 Andy Moniz-Wakefield	Head coach: Steven King; Assistant coaches: Jared Rivers (back line); Nathan Jones (midfield/stoppages); Troy Chaplin (forward line); Mark Jamar (ruck); Rory Atkins (development); Legend: (c) Captain(s); (vc) Vice-captain(s); italics – Inactive; Long-term injury; (B) Category B rookie; Updated: 30 March 2026; Source(s):

== North Melbourne ==
North Melbourne Football Club · AFL personnel
Senior list		Rookie list	Coaching staff
1 Lachy Dovaston; 2 Finn O'Sullivan; 3 Harry Sheezel (vc); 4 Aidan Corr; 5 Caleb Daniel; 6 George Wardlaw; 7 Zane Duursma; 8 Bailey Scott; 9 Luke Davies-Uniacke; 10 Colby McKercher; 11 Luke McDonald; 12 Jy Simpkin; 13 Charlie Spargo; 14 Luke Urquhart; 15 Dylan Stephens; 16 Zac Fisher; 17 Riley Hardeman; 18 Wil Dawson; 19 Griffin Logue	20 Nick Larkey (c); 21 Callum Coleman-Jones; 22 Taylor Goad; 23 Blake Threadgold; 24 Tom Powell; 25 Paul Curtis; 26 Luke Parker; 27 Jack Darling; 28 Hugo Mikunda; 30 Charlie Comben; 31 Josh Goater; 33 Brayden George; 34 Jackson Archer; 35 Matt Whitlock; 36 River Stevens; 37 Cooper Harvey; 38 Tristan Xerri; 41 Jacob Konstanty; 44 Cameron Zurhaar	32 Toby Pink; 39 Tom Blamires; 45 Zac Banch; 46 Robert Hansen Jr.; 47 Cooper Trembath	Head coach: Alastair Clarkson; Assistant coaches: Jed Adcock (back line); Michael Barlow (midfield); Xavier Clarke (forward line); Damian Monkhorst (ruck); Jarrod Lienert (development); Shaun Hampson (development); Darcy Macpherson (development); Legend: (c) Captain(s); (vc) Vice-captain(s); italics – Inactive; Long-term injury; (B) Category B rookie; Updated: 30 March 2026; Source(s):

== Port Adelaide ==
Port Adelaide Football Club · AFL personnel
Senior list		Rookie list	Coaching staff
1 Connor Rozee (c); 2 Sam Powell-Pepper; 3 Jackson Mead; 4 Todd Marshall; 5 Joe Berry; 6 Kane Farrell; 7 Jase Burgoyne; 8 Josh Sinn; 9 Zak Butters (vc); 11 Christian Moraes; 12 Jack Lukosius; 13 Ivan Soldo; 14 Miles Bergman; 15 Jacob Wehr; 16 Ollie Wines; 17 Jack Whitlock; 18 Jason Horne-Francis; 19 Mitch Georgiades; 21 Aliir Aliir	22 Logan Evans; 23 Will Brodie; 24 Jordon Sweet; 25 Brandon Zerk-Thatcher; 26 Tom Cochrane; 27 Esava Ratugolea; 28 Willem Drew (vc); 29 Thomas Anastasopoulos; 30 Ollie Lord; 32 Harrison Ramm; 33 Darcy Byrne-Jones; 34 Lachie Jones; 35 Joe Richards; 36 Will Lorenz; 38 Dante Visentini; 43 Josh Lai; 44 Corey Durdin	31 Ewan Mackinlay; 37 Jack Watkins; 39 Mitch Zadow; 40 Benny Barrett (B); 41 Balyn O'Brien; 42 Jacob Moss (B); 45 Xavier Walsh; 50 Mani Liddy	Head coach: Josh Carr; Assistant coaches: Stuart Dew (senior assistant/midfield); Luke Webster (back line); Darren Reeves (forward line); Hamish Hartlett (contest/stoppage/opposition); Cam Sutcliffe (development – back line); Jacob Surjan (development – midfield); Mitch Clisby (development – forward line); Legend: (c) Captain(s); (vc) Vice-captain(s); italics – Inactive; Long-term injury; (B) Category B rookie; Updated: 30 March 2026; Source(s):

== Richmond ==
Richmond Football Club · AFL personnel
Senior list		Rookie list	Coaching staff
1 Nick Vlastuin; 2 Jacob Hopper; 3 Dion Prestia; 4 Sam Lalor; 5 Jack Ross; 6 Sam Banks; 7 Rhyan Mansell; 8 Jonty Faull; 10 Taj Hotton; 11 Luke Trainor; 12 Ben Miller; 13 Hugo Ralphsmith; 14 Tim Taranto (vc); 15 Jayden Short; 16 Josh Smillie; 17 Maurice Rioli Jr.; 18 Josh Gibcus; 19 Tom Lynch; 21 Noah Balta; 22 Sam Cumming	23 Judson Clarke; 24 Sam Grlj; 25 Toby Nankervis (c); 26 Zane Peucker; 27 Noah Roberts-Thompson; 28 Kane McAuliffe; 29 Jasper Alger; 30 Tom Brown; 32 Samson Ryan; 33 Patrick Retschko; 34 Harry Armstrong; 35 Nathan Broad; 38 Thomas Sims; 40 Tyler Sonsie; 43 Liam Fawcett; 44 Seth Campbell; 48 Steely Green; 49 Kaleb Smith	36 James Trezise; 42 Mykelti Lefau; 45 Tom Burton; 47 Ollie Hayes-Brown (B); 50 Campbell Gray	Head coach: Adem Yze; Assistant coaches: Jake Batchelor (back line); Blake Caracella (midfield/ball movement); Sam Lonergan (midfield/stoppages); Chris Newman (forward line); Ivan Maric (ruck); Taylor Duryea (development – back line); Jack Ziebell (development – midfield); Luke Breust (development – forward line); Legend: (c) Captain(s); (vc) Vice-captain(s); italics – Inactive; Long-term injury; (B) Category B rookie; Updated: 30 March 2026; Source(s):

== St Kilda ==
St Kilda Football Club · AFL personnel
Senior list		Rookie list	Coaching staff
1 Jack Higgins; 2 Marcus Windhager; 3 Jack Silvagni; 4 Lance Collard; 5 Tobie Travaglia; 6 Jack Macrae; 7 Nasiah Wanganeen-Milera; 8 Bradley Hill; 9 Sam Flanders; 10 Mitch Owens; 11 Hunter Clark; 12 Max King; 13 Ryan Byrnes; 14 Liam Stocker; 15 Paddy Dow; 16 Dan Butler; 17 Isaac Keeler; 18 Jack Carroll; 19 Rowan Marshall	20 Dougal Howard; 21 Tom De Koning; 22 Darcy Wilson; 23 Liam Henry; 24 Angus Hastie; 25 Mattaes Phillipou; 26 Alix Tauru; 28 James Barrat; 30 Alex Dodson; 31 Liam Ryan; 32 Mason Wood; 34 Hugo Garcia; 35 Jack Sinclair (c); 36 Charlie Banfield; 37 Kye Fincher; 38 Hugh Boxshall; 43 Cooper Sharman; 44 Callum Wilkie (c); 47 Anthony Caminiti	33 Patrick Said; 40 Max Hall; 42 Kobe McDonald (B); 45 Liam O'Connell; 46 Eamonn Armstrong (B)	Head coach: Ross Lyon; Assistant coaches: Jimmy Allan (back line); Robert Harvey (midfield); Brendon Bolton (forward line); Brendon Goddard (development); Dylan Shiel (development); Legend: (c) Captain(s); (vc) Vice-captain(s); italics – Inactive; Long-term injury; (B) Category B rookie; Updated: 30 March 2026; Source(s):

== Sydney ==
Sydney Swans · AFL personnel
Senior list		Rookie list	Coaching staff
1 Chad Warner; 2 Hayden McLean; 3 Taylor Adams; 4 Brodie Grundy; 5 Isaac Heeney (vc); 6 Logan McDonald; 7 Harry Cunningham; 8 James Rowbottom; 9 Jesse Dattoli; 10 Malcolm Rosas; 11 Tom Papley; 12 Angus Sheldrick; 13 Jai Serong; 14 Callum Mills (c); 15 Sam Wicks; 16 Braeden Campbell; 17 James Jordon; 18 Jevan Phillipou; 19 Peter Ladhams	20 Riak Andrew; 21 Errol Gulden; 22 Nick Blakey; 23 Ned Bowman; 25 Billy Cootee; 26 Riley Bice; 27 Justin McInerney; 30 Tom McCartin; 31 Max King; 32 Harry Kyle; 33 Caiden Cleary; 34 Matthew Roberts; 35 Charlie Curnow; 36 Joel Amartey; 37 Corey Warner; 41 Patrick Snell; 43 Lewis Melican; 45 Will Green	24 Dane Rampe; 28 Will Edwards (B); 29 Joel Hamling; 39 Liam Hetherton (B); 40 Tom Hanily; 42 Noah Chamberlain (B); 44 Jake Lloyd	Head coach: Dean Cox; Assistant coaches: Mark McVeigh (back line); Ben Mathews (midfield); Amon Buchanan (forward line); Jeremy Laidler (assistant); Adam Kennedy (development); Legend: (c) Captain(s); (vc) Vice-captain(s); italics – Inactive; Long-term injury; (B) Category B rookie; Updated: 30 March 2026; Source(s):

== West Coast ==
West Coast Eagles · AFL personnel
Senior list		Rookie list	Coaching staff
1 Willem Duursma; 2 Jake Waterman; 3 Liam Baker (c); 4 Brandon Starcevich; 5 Josh Lindsay; 6 Elliot Yeo; 7 Reuben Ginbey; 8 Elijah Hewett; 9 Harley Reid; 10 Tyler Brockman; 11 Tim Kelly; 12 Sam Allen; 13 Noah Long; 14 Liam Duggan (c); 15 Jamie Cripps; 16 Matthew Owies; 17 Jack Graham; 18 Tom McCarthy; 19 Brady Hough; 20 Tylar Young	21 Cooper Duff-Tytler; 22 Archer Reid; 23 Ryan Maric; 24 Harvey Johnston; 25 Matt Flynn; 26 Bo Allan; 27 Tom Gross; 28 Tom Cole; 29 Clay Hall; 30 Harry Barnett; 31 Lucca Grego; 32 Bailey Williams; 33 Rhett Bazzo; 34 Jack Williams; 35 Jobe Shanahan; 36 Tylah Williams; 38 Hamish Davis; 42 Harry Edwards; 43 Tyrell Dewar	37 Malakai Champion (B); 39 Fred Rodriguez; 40 Deven Robertson; 41 Sandy Brock; 44 Jack Hutchinson; 45 Finlay Macrae; 46 Jacob Newton; 47 Milan Murdock; 48 Harry Schoenberg	Head coach: Andrew McQualter; Assistant coaches: Mitch Duncan (back line); Sam Radford (midfield); Luke Shuey (stoppages); Marco Bello (forward line); Shannon Hurn (development); Jacob Brennan (development); Kyal Horsley (development); Legend: (c) Captain(s); (vc) Vice-captain(s); italics – Inactive; Long-term injury; (B) Category B rookie; Updated: 30 March 2026; Source(s):

== Western Bulldogs ==
Western Bulldogs · AFL personnel
Senior list		Rookie list	Coaching staff
1 Adam Treloar; 2 Lachlan Carmichael; 3 Cody Weightman; 4 Marcus Bontempelli (c); 5 Jedd Busslinger; 6 Cooper Hynes; 7 Rory Lobb; 8 Matthew Kennedy; 9 Ryley Sanders; 10 Sam Darcy; 11 Lachie Jacques; 12 Harvey Gallagher; 13 Oskar Baker; 14 Rhylee West; 15 Will Darcy; 16 Jordan Croft; 17 Nick Coffield; 18 James O'Donnell; 19 Connor Budarick	20 Ed Richards (vc); 21 Tom Liberatore; 23 Laitham Vandermeer; 24 Buku Khamis; 25 Louis Emmett; 26 Josh Dolan; 27 Joel Freijah; 31 Bailey Dale; 32 Arthur Jones; 33 Aaron Naughton (vc); 34 Bailey Williams; 35 Luke Kennedy; 36 Luke Cleary; 38 Riley Garcia; 40 Lachlan Smith; 42 Sam Davidson; 43 Ryan Gardner; 44 Tim English	28 Will Lewis; 29 Lachlan Bramble; 30 Lachlan McNeil; 37 Michael Sellwood; 41 Zac Walker	Head coach: Luke Beveridge; Assistant coaches: Daniel Pratt (back line); Brendon Lade (midfield); Ben Reid (forward line); Jarryn Geary (development); Jack Billings (development); Anthony Barry (development); Legend: (c) Captain(s); (vc) Vice-captain(s); italics – Inactive; Long-term injury; (B) Category B rookie; Updated: 30 March 2026; Source(s):

== See also ==
- List of current AFL Women's team squads
- List of current Australian Football League coaches
