= Duursma =

Duursma is a surname. Notable people with the surname include:

- Jamie Duursma (born 1963), Australian rules footballer
- Michael Duursma (born 1978), Dutch baseball player
- Four siblings who all play Australia rules football professionally
  - Willem Duursma (born 2007)
  - Xavier Duursma (born 2000)
  - Yasmin Duursma (born 2004)
  - Zane Duursma (born 2005)
