= Sullivan Robey =

Australian rules footballer

Personal information
- Full name: Sullivan Robey
- Born: 4 November 2007 (age 19)
- Original team: Eastern Ranges (Talent League)
- Draft: No. 9, 2025 national draft
- Debut: Round 5, 2026, Essendon vs. Melbourne, at Adelaide Oval
- Height: 195 cm (6 ft 5 in)
- Position: Forward / Midfielder

Club information
- Current club: Essendon
- Number: 9

Playing career^{1}
Years	Club	Games (Goals)
2026–	Essendon	15 (9)
- ^{1} Playing statistics correct to the end of round 22, 2026.

Career highlights
- AFL Rising Star nominee: 2026

Sullivan Robey (born 4 October 2007) is a professional Australian rules footballer with the Essendon Football Club in the Australian Football League (AFL).

== Early life and junior career ==
Robey grew up in Beaconsfield, playing junior football for the Beaconsfield Eagles Football Club and the Rowville Football Club, and attending high school at Mazenod College. Robey also played some basketball during his youth, including playing in junior representative teams with the Dandenong Rangers.

Robey played for the Dandenong Stingrays in the Talent League at under 16 level, but failed to make their under 18 squad in what would've been his draft year. With permission from Dandenong, Robey played a pre-season trial game for the Eastern Ranges, as he was geographically zoned to Dandenong but played local footy for Rowville, which was in the Ranges zone. Robey wasn't signed for the start of the season, with the Ranges opting to keep some list spots open for players who impressed at local level during the season. Robey returned to play local footy, where he played in the Rowville seniors team and performed strongly. Robey in the first few months of his AFL career has gained the nickname "Young Gun" as he is very skilled for his age. In June, Robey was added to the Eastern Ranges list, having impressed over the first half of the season. Robey impressed immediately, catching the attention of AFL recruiters within his first few matches, including a 40 disposal performance against Calder Cannons. Robey capped off his rapid rise by kicking four goals in the Ranges' Grand Final win over the Sandringham Dragons.

By the end of the season, Robey was widely touted as a potential top 10 draft pick, and was given a late invitation to the AFL Draft Combine following widespread interest from AFL clubs. Robey was described by Eastern Ranges coach, Lauren Morecroft, as the "draft bolter of the decade". Robey was forced to skip some of the testing at the combine due to a fractured collarbone that he had played through at the end of the season, but participated in running tests.

Robey grew up in a passionate Essendon supporting family, and said in an interview with Seven News two days prior to the draft that it would "obviously be a massive dream come true" if he were to be drafted to the Essendon Football Club, however it was predicted that he would be selected by Richmond with the selection before Essendon's first pick.

== AFL career ==
After heavy speculation and widespread expectation that Robey would be selected by Richmond one pick before Essendon's first pick, Richmond pulled a surprise by instead selecting Sam Grlj. Essendon drafted Robey with pick 9 in the 2025 AFL draft, fulfilling his boyhood dream to play for the club. Robey was the first of three selections for the Bombers inside the top 13 picks, soon being joined by Jacob Farrow at pick 10 and fellow Essendon supporter, Dyson Sharp, at pick 13.

Within days of joining Essendon, the club discovered signs of back stress, and scaled back Robey's training loads through pre-season to avoid it becoming a stress fracture. Having had an interrupted pre-season, Robey started the season playing for Essendon's reserves team in the Victorian Football League (VFL), including an impressive performance against North Melbourne's reserves where he had 23 disposals and kicked 4 goals.

Robey was selected for his AFL debut in Round 5 of the 2026 AFL season, against Melbourne at the Adelaide Oval in Gather Round. Robey kicked his first goal in the AFL the following week against Gold Coast at Carrara Stadium. After his game in Round 9 against Greater Western Sydney at Sydney Showground Stadium, Robey's fifth AFL match, he was nominated for the 2026 AFL Rising Star award for his 20 disposal, 5 tackle effort.

== Statistics ==
Updated to the end of round 22, 2026.

Legend
G	Goals	K	Kicks	D	Disposals	T	Tackles
B	Behinds	H	Handballs	M	Marks

Season	Team	No.	Games	Totals							Averages (per game)							Votes
Season	Team	No.	Games	G	B	K	H	D	M	T	G	B	K	H	D	M	T	Votes
2026	Essendon	9	15	9	2	111	130	241	46	48	0.6	0.1	7.4	8.7	16.1	3.1	3.2	0
Career			15	9	2	111	130	241	46	48	0.6	0.1	7.4	8.7	16.1	3.1	3.2	0
