= Oakleigh Chargers =

Oakleigh Chargers FC

Names
- Full name: Oakleigh Chargers Football Club
- Nickname: Chargers

2026 season
- After finals: 6th
- Home-and-away season: 7th

Club details
- Founded: 1995; 31 years ago
- Colours: Blue Red
- Competition: Talent League
- Premierships: Talent League (5) 2006, 2012, 2014, 2015, 2019
- Ground: Warrawee Park

Other information
- Official website: OCFC

The Oakleigh Chargers is an Australian rules football club playing in the Talent League, the top statewide under-18 competition in Victoria, Australia. They are based at Warrawee Park in Oakleigh, Victoria, representing the southeastern suburban area of Melbourne. The Chargers were one of two additional metropolitan clubs introduced to the competition in 1995 as part of a plan by the AFL to replace the traditional club zones with independent junior clubs. This was to help aid in player development and the process of the AFL draft. In June 2008 the Chargers moved into a new pavilion at Warrawee Park, however they rarely play in Oakleigh, if at all. The chargers are aligned to Collingwood, Richmond & Port Melbourne. The Chargers have had the past 2 #1 AFL Draft picks and last #1 AFL W Draft picks making them one of the most successful development programs in Australia.

== AFL Draftees History ==
- 1995: -
- 1996: Heath Black, Patrick Steinfort
- 1997: Luke Power, Paul DiGiovine
- 1998: Ian Prendergast, Luke Penny, Adam Morgan, James White, Cameron McKenzie-McHarg
- 1999: Caydn Beetham, Chad Davis, Luke Williams
- 2000: Matthew Smith, Nick Gill
- 2001: Sam Power, Campbell Brown, Ashley Hansen, Andrew Carrazzo, Bret Thornton, Will Slade, Justin Crow
- 2002: Cameron Croad, Stephen Gilham
- 2003: Julian Rowe, David Jackson, Thomas Roach
- 2004: Josh Gibson
- 2005: Marc Murphy, Beau Dowler, Matthew Laidlaw
- 2006: Todd Goldstein, David MacKay, Robert Gray, Sam Sheldon (Nick Smith)
- 2007: Andy Otten
- 2008: Luke Shuey, James Strauss, Dan Hannebery, Zac Clarke, Jordan Lisle, Casey Sibosado, Robin Nahas
- 2009: Jamie MacMillan, Sam Shaw, Ben Sinclair
- 2010: Andrew Gaff, Patrick Karnezis, Ryan Lester, Sam Crocker, Viv Michie, Alex Browne, Alex Johnson
- 2011: Tim Golds, Dom Tyson, Adam Tomlinson, Toby Greene, Tom Curran, Daniel Pearce, Matthew Arnot, Lin Jong
- 2012: Jackson Macrae, Kristian Jaksch, Jack Viney, Jason Ashby
- 2013: Jack Billings, Tom Cutler, Jay Kennedy Harris, Darcy Byrne-Jones, Lachlan Mackie, Will Maginness
- 2014: Jordan De Goey, Darcy Moore, Daniel McKenzie, Toby McLean, Marc Pittonet, Jack Sinclair
- 2015: David Cuningham, Alex Morgan, Jack Silvagni, Tom Phillips, Ben Crocker, Dan Houston
- 2016: Jordan Ridley, Sam McLarty, Ed Phillips, Josh Daicos, Dion Johnstone, Patrick Kerr, Nick Larkey, Taylin Duman
- 2017: Ed Richards, Jack Higgins, Toby Wooler
- 2018: Isaac Quaynor, Riley Collier-Dawkins, James Rowbottom, Xavier O'Neill, Will Kelly, James Jordon, Jack Ross, Noah Answerth, Ben Silvagni, Atu Bosenavulagi, Will Golds
- 2019: Matt Rowell, Noah Anderson, Dylan Williams, Nick Bryan, Trent Bianco, Lachlan Johnson
- 2020: Jamarra Ugle-Hagan, Will Phillips, Conor Stone, Finlay Macrae, Bailey Laurie, Reef McInnes, Maurice Rioli Jr
- 2021: Nick Daicos, Sam Darcy, Lachlan Rankin, Patrick Voss, Karl Worner
- 2022: Elijah Tsatas, George Wardlaw, Matthew Jefferson, Josh Weddle, Max Gruzewski, Alwyn Davey Jr., Jack O'Sullivan, Bailey Macdonald, Jayden Davey, Blake Drury
- 2023: Will Lorenz, Harvey Thomas, Kynan Brown
- 2024: Finn O'Sullivan, Jagga Smith, Tom Gross, Jasper Alger, Blake Leidler, Patrick Retschko
- 2025: Sam Grlj, Louis Emmett, Sam Allen, Hunter Holmes, Max Kondogiannis, Jack Ison, Zac McCarthy, Will Darcy, Jai Saxena

== Honours ==
=== Talent League Boys ===
- Premierships (5): 2006, 2012, 2014, 2015, 2019
- Runners-up (2): 2011, 2018
- Minor Premiers (1): 2017
- Wooden Spoons (1): 2024
- Morrish Medallists: Jack Higgins (2017)
- Grand Final Best-on-Ground Medalists: Matthew Rowell (2018, 2019)

=== Talent League Girls ===
- Premierships (2): 2021, 2023
- Runners-up (1): 2026
