= 2026 AFL Rising Star =

Australian football award

- Sponsored by: Telstra
- Date: 25 August 2026
- Country: Australia
- Ron Evans Medallist: Jagga Smith (Carlton)

The Telstra AFL Rising Star award is given annually to a standout young player in the Australian Football League (AFL). The winner also receives the Ron Evans Medal, named for the former AFL chairman.

The 2026 winner was Jagga Smith, from the Carlton Football Club.

== Eligibility ==
Every round, a nomination is given to a standout young player who performed well during that particular round. To be eligible for nomination, a player must be under 21 on 1 January of that year and have played ten or fewer senior games before the start of the season; a player who is suspended may be nominated, but is not eligible to win the award.

== Nominations ==
Key
^	Winner
*	Ineligible to win the Rising Star due to suspension.

2026 AFL Rising Star nominees
Round	Player	Club	Ref.
0	Leo Lombard	Gold Coast	
1	Jagga Smith^	Carlton	
2	Jobe Shanahan	West Coast	
3	Willem Duursma	West Coast	
4	Cooper Trembath	North Melbourne	
5	Jacob Farrow	Essendon	
6	Phoenix Gothard	Greater Western Sydney	
7	Sam Grlj	Richmond	
8	Jack Whitlock	Port Adelaide	
9	Sullivan Robey	Essendon	
10	Josh Lindsay	West Coast	
11	Patrick Retschko	Richmond	
12	Harry Dean	Carlton	
13	Cooper Hynes	Western Bulldogs	
14	Jasper Alger	Richmond	
15	Jai Murray	Gold Coast	
16	Ty Gallop*	Brisbane Lions	
17	Zeke Uwland	Gold Coast	
18	Riley Hamilton	Greater Western Sydney	
19	Dyson Sharp	Essendon	
20	Talor Byrne	Carlton	
21	Mitchell Edwards	Geelong	
22	Jesse Dattoli	Sydney	
23	Sam Swadling	Collingwood	
24	Billy Wilson	Carlton	

Table of nominations by club
Number	Club	Player	Nom.
4
4	Carlton	Jagga Smith	1
4	Carlton	Harry Dean	12
4	Carlton	Talor Byrne	20
4	Carlton	Billy Wilson	24
3
3	Essendon	Jacob Farrow	5
3	Essendon	Sullivan Robey	9
3	Essendon	Dyson Sharp	19
3	Gold Coast	Leo Lombard	0
3	Gold Coast	Jai Murray	15
3	Gold Coast	Zeke Uwland	17
3	Richmond	Sam Grlj	7
3	Richmond	Patrick Retschko	11
3	Richmond	Jasper Alger	14
3	West Coast	Jobe Shanahan	2
3	West Coast	Willem Duursma	3
3	West Coast	Josh Lindsay	10
2	Greater Western Sydney	Phoenix Gothard	6
2	Greater Western Sydney	Riley Hamilton	18
1	Brisbane Lions	Ty Gallop	16
1	Collingwood	Sam Swadling	23
1	Geelong	Mitchell Edwards	21
1	North Melbourne	Cooper Trembath	4
1	Port Adelaide	Jack Whitlock	8
1	Sydney	Jesse Dattoli	22
1	Western Bulldogs	Cooper Hynes	13

== Final voting ==
The winner was decided by an 11-person panel consisting of Andrew Dillon (chair), Eddie Betts, Simon Black, Jude Bolton, Abbey Holmes, Glen Jakovich, Laura Kane, David Mundy, Joel Selwood, Kevin Sheehan and Greg Swann. Each member awarded five votes to the player they determined most deserving, four votes to the second-most deserving, and so on to one vote to the fifth-most deserving.

=== Vote receivers ===
	Player	Club	Votes
1	Jagga Smith	Carlton	54
2	Harry Dean	Carlton	39
3	Willem Duursma	West Coast	29
4	Cooper Trembath	North Melbourne	28
5	Jobe Shanahan	West Coast	9
6	Leo Lombard	Gold Coast	3
7	Sullivan Robey	Essendon	1
7	Dyson Sharp	Essendon	1
7	Mitchell Edwards	Geelong	1

=== Full votes ===
Panel member	5 votes	4 votes	3 votes	2 votes	1 vote
Andrew Dillon (chair)	Jagga Smith (Carlton)	Harry Dean (Carlton)	Cooper Trembath (North Melbourne)	Willem Duursma (West Coast)	Jobe Shanahan (West Coast)
Eddie Betts	Jagga Smith (Carlton)	Cooper Trembath (North Melbourne)	Harry Dean (Carlton)	Willem Duursma (West Coast)	Leo Lombard (Gold Coast)
Simon Black	Jagga Smith (Carlton)	Willem Duursma (West Coast)	Harry Dean (Carlton)	Jobe Shanahan (West Coast)	Cooper Trembath (North Melbourne)
Jude Bolton	Jagga Smith (Carlton)	Harry Dean (Carlton)	Willem Duursma (West Coast)	Cooper Trembath (North Melbourne)	Jobe Shanahan (West Coast)
Abbey Holmes	Jagga Smith (Carlton)	Harry Dean (Carlton)	Willem Duursma (West Coast)	Cooper Trembath (North Melbourne)	Jobe Shanahan (West Coast)
Glen Jakovich	Jagga Smith (Carlton)	Willem Duursma (West Coast)	Cooper Trembath (North Melbourne)	Jobe Shanahan (West Coast)	Harry Dean (Carlton)
Laura Kane	Harry Dean (Carlton)	Jagga Smith (Carlton)	Cooper Trembath (North Melbourne)	Willem Duursma (West Coast)	Dyson Sharp (Essendon)
David Mundy	Jagga Smith (Carlton)	Cooper Trembath (North Melbourne)	Harry Dean (Carlton)	Jobe Shanahan (West Coast)	Sullivan Robey (Essendon)
Joel Selwood	Jagga Smith (Carlton)	Harry Dean (Carlton)	Willem Duursma (West Coast)	Cooper Trembath (North Melbourne)	Mitchell Edwards (Geelong)
Kevin Sheehan	Jagga Smith (Carlton)	Harry Dean (Carlton)	Willem Duursma (West Coast)	Cooper Trembath (North Melbourne)	Leo Lombard (Gold Coast)
Greg Swann	Jagga Smith (Carlton)	Harry Dean (Carlton)	Willem Duursma (West Coast)	Cooper Trembath (North Melbourne)	Leo Lombard (Gold Coast)

== See also ==
- 2026 AFL Women's Rising Star
