= Mitchell Edwards =

Personal information
- Born: 6 February 2005 (age 21)
- Original teams: South Mandurah (PFL); Peel Thunder (WAFL)
- Draft: No. 32, 2023 National draft
- Debut: Round 1, 2026, Geelong vs. Fremantle, at Kardinia Park
- Height: 206 cm (6 ft 9 in)
- Position: Ruck

Playing career^{1}
Years	Club	Games (Goals)
2026–	Geelong	20 (3)
- ^{1} Playing statistics correct to the end of 2026.

Career highlights
- AFL Rising Star nominee: 2026; Geelong best young player: 2026

Mitchell Edwards (born 2 June 2005) is a professional Australian rules footballer who plays for the Geelong Football Club in the Australian Football League (AFL).

== Junior career ==
Edwards began playing football with the South Mandurah Junior Football Club, beginning at Auskick and going through to Year 10. He played school football for Mandurah Catholic College.

Edwards played for Peel Thunder in the WAFL Colts. He won a premiership with them in 2022. During his junior career, Edwards was also part of Fremantle's Next Generation Academy, being of Indigenous descent.

== AFL career ==
Edwards was drafted by Geelong with pick 32 of the 2023 AFL draft. Despite being tied to Fremantle through their Next Generation Academy, the AFL rules at the time meant NGA bids could not be matched within the first 40 selections of the draft.

Edwards made his debut in round 1 of the 2026 AFL season. In July 2026, he signed a contract extension to the end of 2030.

In round 21 of the 2026 season, Edwards had 12 disposals and 25 hitouts to earn a nomination for the 2026 AFL Rising Star award.

== Statistics ==
Updated to the end of the 2026 season.

Legend
G	Goals	K	Kicks	D	Disposals	T	Tackles
B	Behinds	H	Handballs	M	Marks	H/O	Hit-outs

Season	Team	No.	Games	Totals								Averages (per game)								Votes
Season	Team	No.	Games	G	B	K	H	D	M	T	H/O	G	B	K	H	D	M	T	H/O	Votes
2024	Geelong	11	0	—	—	—	—	—	—	—	—	—	—	—	—	—	—	—	—	0
2025	Geelong	11	0	—	—	—	—	—	—	—	—	—	—	—	—	—	—	—	—	0
2026	Geelong	11	20	3	3	84	123	207	28	38	424	0.2	0.2	4.2	6.2	10.4	1.4	1.9	21.2	0
Career			20	3	3	84	123	207	28	38	424	0.2	0.2	4.2	6.2	10.4	1.4	1.9	21.2	0
