= Matthew Laidlaw =

Australian rules footballer

Personal information
- Born: 9 February 1987 (age 39)
- Original team: Oakleigh Chargers
- Debut: 30 June 2007, Sydney Swans vs. Geelong, at Skilled Stadium
- Height: 186 cm (6 ft 1 in)
- Weight: 82 kg (181 lb)

Playing career^{1}
Years	Club	Games (Goals)
2007	Sydney Swans	1 (0)
- ^{1} Playing statistics correct to the end of 2007.

Matthew Laidlaw (born 9 February 1987) is an Australian rules footballer in the Australian Football League.

He was recruited as the number 51 draft pick in the 2005 AFL draft from Oakleigh Chargers.

Laidlaw was nominated for the Cleo Bachelor of the Year 2009.
