= Harry Dean (footballer) =

Personal information
- Full name: Harry Dean
- Nickname: Deany
- Born: 13 November 2007 (age 18)
- Original teams: Bullioh (UMFNL); Lavington (OMFNL); Murray Bushrangers (Talent League)
- Draft: No. 3 (F/S), 2025 AFL draft
- Debut: Opening Round, 2026, Carlton vs. Sydney, at the SCG
- Height: 193 cm (6 ft 4 in)
- Position: Key Defender

Club information
- Current club: Carlton
- Number: 35

Playing career^{1}
Years	Club	Games (Goals)
2026–	Carlton	22 (1)
- ^{1} Playing statistics correct to the end of the 2026 season.

Career highlights
- AFLPA Best First Year Player: 2026; AFL Rising Star nominee: 2026; 22under22 team: 2026

Harry Dean (born 13 November 2007) is a professional Australian rules footballer who plays for the Carlton Football Club in the Australian Football League (AFL).

== Junior career ==
Dean played for the Murray Bushrangers in the Talent League. In the first game of the 2024 season, Dean suffered a broken shoulder and was ruled out of the remainder of the year. In 2025, he averaged 17.4 disposals and 7.1 marks per game.

Dean also played for Vic Country in the Under 18 Championships. At the end of the 2025 season, Dean was named as the national carnival's All-Australian centre half-back.

== AFL career ==
Dean was bid on by West Coast with pick 3 of the 2025 AFL draft, with the bid matched by Carlton through the father-son rule. He was given the number 35, the same number worn by his father. Dean made his debut in Opening Round of the 2026 AFL season. He had six intercepts in a loss to the Sydney Swans. In round 12 of the 2026 season, Dean had 15 disposals and 7 intercepts to receive a nomination for the 2026 AFL Rising Star award.

At the end of the 2026 season, Dean was named in the 2026 22 Under 22 team. At the AFL Awards night, Dean was named the AFLPA Best First Year Player for 2026. In the 2026 Rising Star votes he placed second to Carlton teammate Jagga Smith.

== Personal life ==
Dean's father, Peter Dean, played 248 games for Carlton, winning two premierships in 1987 and 1995.

== Statistics ==
Updated to the end of the 2026 season.

Legend
G	Goals	K	Kicks	D	Disposals	T	Tackles
B	Behinds	H	Handballs	M	Marks

Season	Team	No.	Games	Totals							Averages (per game)							Votes
Season	Team	No.	Games	G	B	K	H	D	M	T	G	B	K	H	D	M	T	Votes
2026	Carlton	35	22	1	0	157	101	258	107	28	0.0	0.0	7.1	4.6	11.7	4.9	1.3	1
Career			22	1	0	157	101	258	107	28	0.0	0.0	7.1	4.6	11.7	4.9	1.3	1
