= Talor Byrne =

Personal information
- Full name: Talor Byrne
- Nicknames: Blizzard, Bunsen
- Born: 14 November 2007 (age 18)
- Original teams: Koroit (HFNL); GWV Rebels (Talent League)
- Draft: No. 45, 2025 AFL draft
- Debut: Round 3, 2026, Carlton vs. Melbourne, at the MCG
- Height: 174 cm (5 ft 9 in)
- Position: Forward

Club information
- Current club: Carlton
- Number: 39

Playing career^{1}
Years	Club	Games (Goals)
2026–	Carlton	20 (15)
- ^{1} Playing statistics correct to the end of the 2026 season.

Career highlights
- AFL Rising Star nominee: 2026

Talor Byrne (born 14 November 2007) is a professional Australian rules footballer who plays for the Carlton Football Club in the Australian Football League (AFL).

== Junior career ==
Byrne played junior Football for the Koroit Football Club in the Hampden Football League. He played school football for Emmanuel College.

Byrne played in the Talent League for the GWV Rebels. In his draft year, he averaged 19.1 disposals and 0.7 goals per game. He also played for Vic Country in the Under 18 Championships, where he averaged 10.3 disposals and 2 goals per game.

== AFL career ==
Byrne was selected with pick 45 of the 2025 AFL draft by Carlton. He was selected to make his debut in round 3 of the 2026 AFL season, kicking a goal in the first quarter.

In round 6 of the 2026 AFL season Byrne had a shot at goal after the final siren to draw the game for Carlton against Collingwood, but kicked a behind. In round 20 of the 2026 season, Byrne kicked 3 goals, had 12 score involvements and 17 disposals to earn himself a nomination for the 2026 AFL Rising Star award.

== Statistics ==
Updated to the end of the 2026 season.

Legend
G	Goals	K	Kicks	D	Disposals	T	Tackles
B	Behinds	H	Handballs	M	Marks

Season	Team	No.	Games	Totals							Averages (per game)							Votes
Season	Team	No.	Games	G	B	K	H	D	M	T	G	B	K	H	D	M	T	Votes
2026	Carlton	39	20	15	12	107	70	177	63	50	0.8	0.6	5.4	3.5	8.9	3.2	2.5	0
Career			20	15	12	107	70	177	63	50	0.8	0.6	5.4	3.5	8.9	3.2	2.5	0
