= Cooper Trembath =

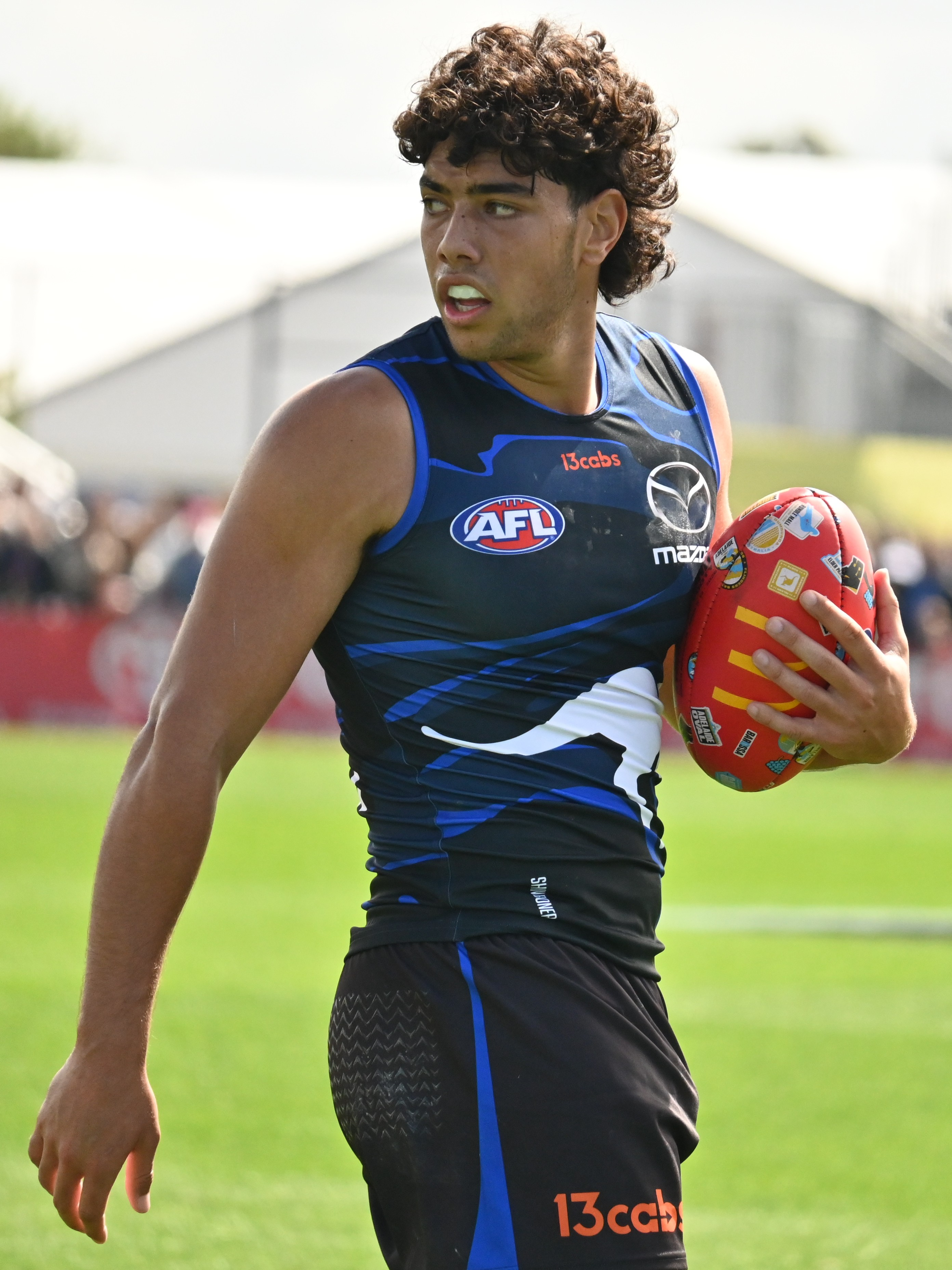
- Trembath in April 2026

Personal information
- Nicknames: Tremmers, Trembanyama, The Duck
- Born: 17 October 2005 (age 21)
- Original teams: North Melbourne (VFL); Eastern Ranges (Talent League); Blackburn (EFNL)
- Draft: No. 10, 2025 mid-season rookie draft
- Debut: Round 22, 2025, North Melbourne vs. Greater Western Sydney, at Manuka Oval
- Height: 193 cm (6 ft 4 in)
- Position: Key forward / Ruck

Club information
- Current club: North Melbourne
- Number: 47

Playing career^{1}
Years	Club	Games (Goals)
2025–	North Melbourne	26 (41)
- ^{1} Playing statistics correct to the end of the 2026 season.

Career highlights
- AFL Rising Star nominee: 2026; 22under22 team: 2026

Cooper Trembath (born 17 October 2005) is a professional Australian rules footballer who plays for the North Melbourne Football Club in the Australian Football League (AFL).

== Junior and VFL career ==
Growing up, Trembath played junior football for Park Orchards Sharks in the Yarra Junior Football League.

Trembath played for the Eastern Ranges in the Talent League in his junior year. He also played a game for Victorian Football League (VFL) club Frankston. He averaged over 13 disposals as a tall defender. After going undrafted, Trembath signed with North Melbourne in the VFL. He also played for local club Blackburn in the Eastern Football League.

== AFL career ==
Trembath was selected by North Melbourne with pick 10 of the 2025 mid-season rookie draft. He made his debut in round 22 of the 2025 AFL season against the Greater Western Sydney Giants. He kicked three goals in each his first four matches, becoming the first player since the 1990s to do so.

In round 4 of the 2026 AFL season, Trembath kicked three goals from 11 disposals, as well as playing a backup ruck role in a comeback win, to receive a nomination for the 2026 AFL Rising Star award. He signed a three-year contract extension with North Melbourne in April 2026.

At the end of the 2026 season, Trembath was named as the ruck for the 2026 22 Under 22 team.

== Personal life ==
Trembath is of Mauritian descent via his mother's side of the family. He attended school at Whitefriars College and played football for the school.

== Statistics ==
Updated to the end of the 2026 season.

Legend
G	Goals	K	Kicks	D	Disposals	T	Tackles
B	Behinds	H	Handballs	M	Marks	H/O	Hit-outs

Season	Team	No.	Games	Totals								Averages (per game)								Votes
Season	Team	No.	Games	G	B	K	H	D	M	T	H/O	G	B	K	H	D	M	T	H/O	Votes
2025	North Melbourne	47	3	9	4	16	10	26	10	5	0	3.0	1.3	5.3	3.3	8.7	3.3	1.7	0.0	0
2026	North Melbourne	47	23	32	10	131	98	229	103	49	119	1.4	0.4	5.7	4.3	10.0	4.5	2.1	5.2	2
Career			26	41	14	147	108	255	113	54	119	1.6	0.5	5.7	4.2	9.8	4.4	2.1	4.6	2
