= Bailey Laurie =

Australian rules footballer

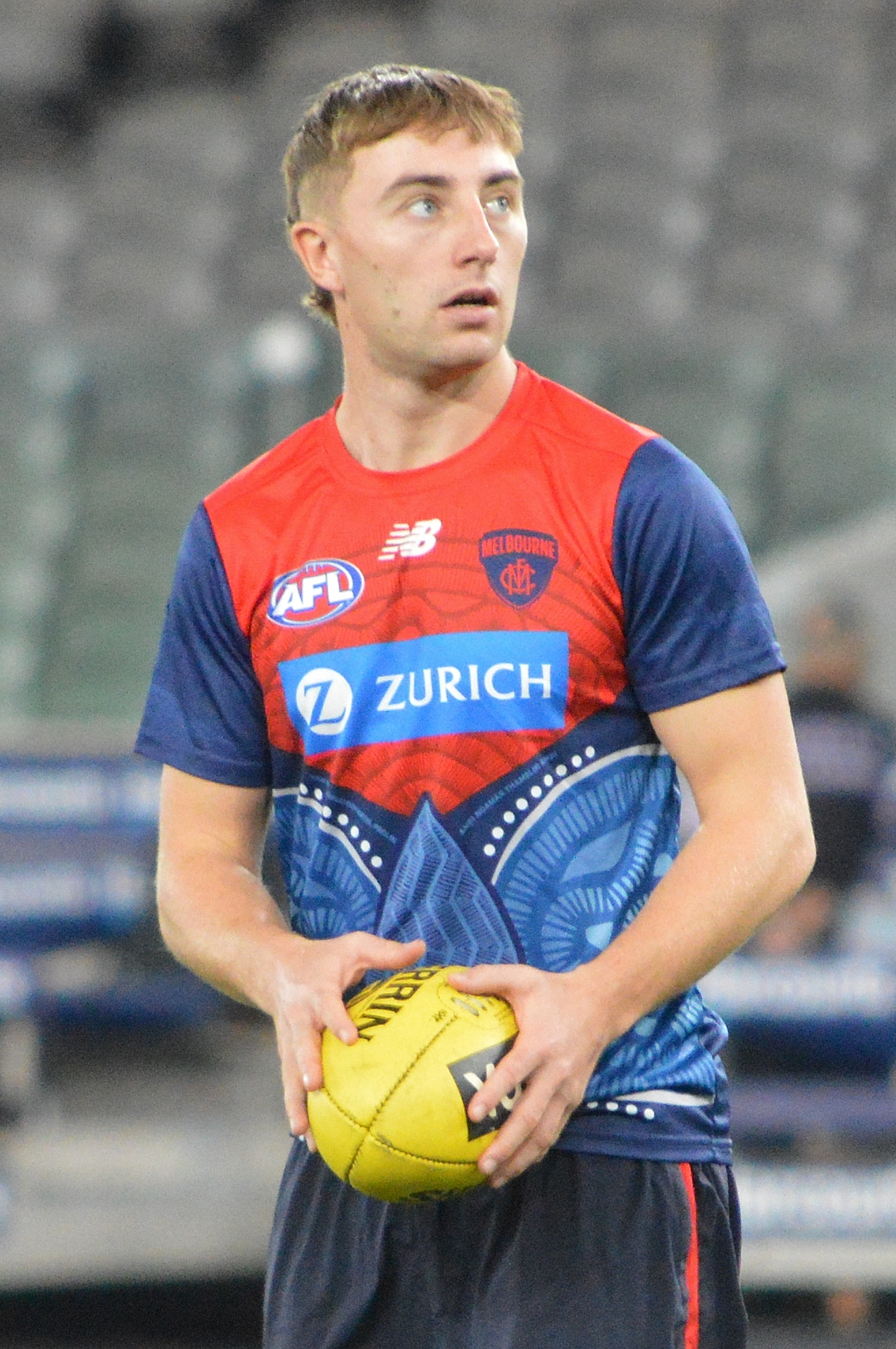
- Laurie in May 2026

Personal information
- Full name: Bailey Laurie
- Nickname: The Pigeon
- Born: 24 March 2002 (age 24)
- Original team: Oakleigh Chargers (TAC Cup)
- Draft: No. 22 2020 national draft
- Debut: Round 1, 2023, Melbourne vs. Western Bulldogs, at MCG
- Height: 179 cm (5 ft 10 in)
- Position: Medium forward

Club information
- Current club: Melbourne
- Number: 16

Playing career^{1}
Years	Club	Games (Goals)
2021–	Melbourne	26 (12)
- ^{1} Playing statistics correct to the end of round 22, 2026.

Bailey Laurie (born 24 March 2002) is a professional Australian rules footballer playing for the Melbourne Football Club in the Australian Football League (AFL). A medium forward, he is 1.79 metres (5 ft 10 in) tall. He made his debut in the fifty point win to Western Bulldogs at the Melbourne Cricket Ground in round 1 of the 2023 season.

== Statistics ==
Updated to the end of round 22, 2026.

Legend
G	Goals	K	Kicks	D	Disposals	T	Tackles
B	Behinds	H	Handballs	M	Marks

Season	Team	No.	Games	Totals							Averages (per game)							Votes
Season	Team	No.	Games	G	B	K	H	D	M	T	G	B	K	H	D	M	T	Votes
2021	Melbourne	16	0	—	—	—	—	—	—	—	—	—	—	—	—	—	—	0
2022	Melbourne	16	0	—	—	—	—	—	—	—	—	—	—	—	—	—	—	0
2023	Melbourne	16	5	0	1	14	22	36	3	6	0.0	0.2	2.8	4.4	7.2	0.6	1.2	0
2024	Melbourne	16	6	2	0	24	30	54	11	9	0.3	0.0	4.0	5.0	9.0	1.8	1.5	0
2025	Melbourne	16	1	0	1	2	1	3	1	0	0.0	1.0	2.0	1.0	3.0	1.0	0.0	0
2026	Melbourne	16	14	10	9	98	82	180	38	29	0.7	0.6	7.0	5.9	12.9	2.7	2.1	0
Career			26	12	11	138	135	273	53	44	0.5	0.4	5.3	5.2	10.5	2.0	1.7	0
