= Cooper Hynes =

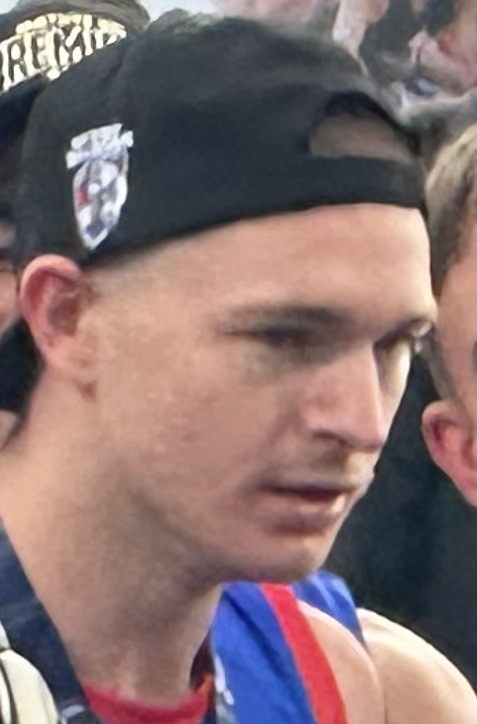
- Hynes in September 2025

Personal information
- Born: 28 February 2006 (age 20)
- Original team: Bonbeach YCW JFC/Dandenong Stingrays
- Draft: No. 20, 2024 AFL draft
- Debut: Round 5, 2025, Western Bulldogs vs. Brisbane Lions, at Norwood Oval
- Height: 190 cm (6 ft 3 in)
- Position: Midfielder/Forward

Club information
- Current club: Western Bulldogs
- Number: 6

Playing career^{1}
Years	Club	Games (Goals)
2025–	Western Bulldogs	27 (14)
- ^{1} Playing statistics correct to the end of round 22, 2026.

Career highlights
- VFL premiership player: 2025; AFL Rising Star nominee: 2026

Cooper Hynes (born 28 February 2006) is a professional Australian rules footballer who plays for the Western Bulldogs in the Australian Football League (AFL).

== Early life ==
Hynes attended school at Rowville Secondary College.

== Junior career ==
Hynes played for the Dandenong Stingrays in the Talent League. He averaged 23.7 disposals and 1.5 goals in his draft year, coming second place in the Morrish Medal, with two votes less than the winner Xavier Lindsay. He was also named at half-forward in the 2024 RMC Coates Talent League Team of the Year.

Hynes also played for Vic Metro in the Under 18 Championships. In his best performance, he gathered 20 disposals and two goals against Western Australia.

== AFL career ==
Hynes was selected by the Western Bulldogs with pick 20 of the 2024 AFL draft. After a game-winning goal in the final minute of a VFL match against Werribee, Hynes was selected to make his AFL debut against the Brisbane Lions. Hynes was part of the Bulldogs' 2025 VFL Premiership side.

In round 13 of the 2026 AFL season, Hynes had 21 disposals to earn himself a nomination for the 2026 AFL Rising Star award.

== Personal life ==
Hynes' father, John Hynes, played four games for the Carlton Football Club.

== Statistics ==
Updated to the end of round 22, 2026.

Legend
G	Goals	K	Kicks	D	Disposals	T	Tackles
B	Behinds	H	Handballs	M	Marks

Season	Team	No.	Games	Totals							Averages (per game)							Votes
Season	Team	No.	Games	G	B	K	H	D	M	T	G	B	K	H	D	M	T	Votes
2025	Western Bulldogs	6	8	4	1	21	29	50	13	9	0.5	0.1	2.6	3.6	6.3	1.6	1.1	0
2026	Western Bulldogs	6	19	10	3	128	116	244	40	55	0.5	0.2	6.7	6.1	12.8	2.1	2.9	0
Career			27	14	4	149	145	294	53	64	0.5	0.1	5.5	5.4	10.9	2.0	2.4	0
