= Jasper Alger =

Australian rules footballer

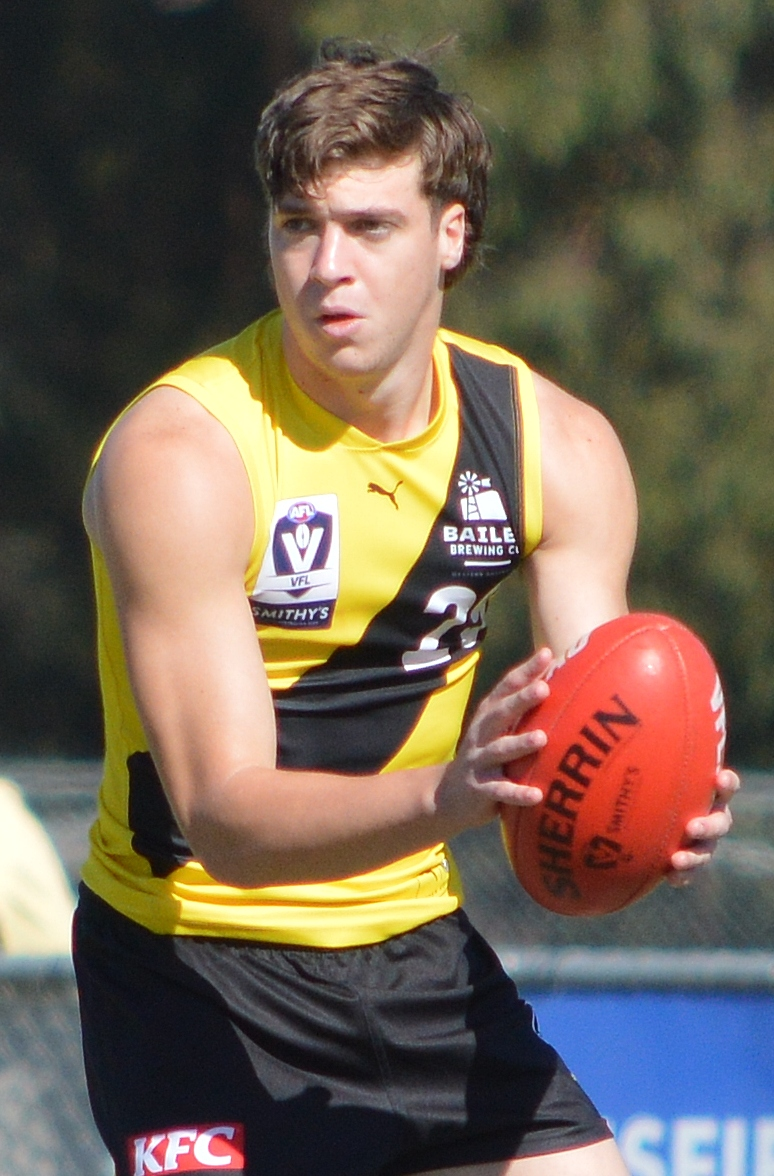
- Alger with Richmond's VFL side in March 2025

Personal information
- Born: 17 December 2006 (age 19)
- Original teams: Oakleigh Chargers (Talent League); Gippsland Power (Talent League); Warragul (GL)
- Draft: No. 58, 2024 AFL draft
- Debut: Round 15, 2025, Richmond vs. Western Bulldogs, at Marvel Stadium
- Height: 183 cm (6 ft 0 in)
- Position: Forward

Club information
- Current club: Richmond
- Number: 29

Playing career^{1}
Years	Club	Games (Goals)
2025–	Richmond	12 (15)
- ^{1} Playing statistics correct to the end of 2026.

Career highlights
- Rising Star nominee: 2026

Jasper Alger (AHL-GAH) (born 17 December 2006) is an Australian rules footballer who plays for the Richmond Football Club in the Australian Football League (AFL). A medium-sized forward, Alger was drafted in the fourth round of the 2024 AFL draft and made his debut in the second half of the 2025 season.

== Early life and junior football ==
Alger was raised in Warragul, a Victorian country town 102 kilometres south-east of Melbourne. He attended the local Marist-Sion College for most of his high school education and played junior football at Warragul Football Club at various age levels of the Gippsland Football League.

In 2022 Alger represented the Victorian Country region at the Under 16 national championships, made his senior debut for Warragul and debuted in top level representative junior football with Gippsland Power in the Talent League.

The following year he moved schools to Caulfield Grammar School in inner city Melbourne, where he attended and represented the school in football in the Associated Public Schools of Victoria competition, while also continuing to play with the Power. To that point, he played predominantly as a wing and half-back.

Alger moved Talent League clubs in 2024 to join the Oakleigh Chargers where he played six matches, moving into a role as a permanent forward. He represented the Victoria Country region at the Under 18 national championships in four matches as well that year, kicking five goals.

== AFL career ==
Alger was drafted by Richmond with the club's eighth pick and the 58th selection overall in the 2024 AFL draft.

He made his AFL debut in round 15, 2025, in a match against Western Bulldogs at the Marvel Stadium.

Alger was nominated for the 2026 AFL Rising Star award in round 14, 2026, following a four-goal performance against the reigning premiers Brisbane Lions.

== Statistics ==
Updated to the end of the 2026 season.

Legend
G	Goals	K	Kicks	D	Disposals	T	Tackles
B	Behinds	H	Handballs	M	Marks

Season	Team	No.	Games	Totals							Averages (per game)							Votes
Season	Team	No.	Games	G	B	K	H	D	M	T	G	B	K	H	D	M	T	Votes
2025	Richmond	29	4	2	1	11	9	20	5	3	0.5	0.3	2.8	2.3	5.0	1.3	0.8	0
2026	Richmond	29	8	13	5	33	32	65	21	12	1.6	0.6	4.1	4.0	8.1	2.6	1.5	0
Career			12	15	6	44	41	85	26	15	1.3	0.5	3.7	3.4	7.1	2.2	1.3	0
