= Matthew Jefferson =

Australian rules footballer

Personal information
- Born: 8 March 2004 (age 22)
- Original team: Oakleigh Chargers (Talent League)
- Draft: No. 15, 2022 national draft
- Debut: Round 1, 2025, Melbourne vs. Greater Western Sydney, at MCG
- Height: 195 cm (6 ft 5 in)
- Position: Key forward

Club information
- Current club: Melbourne
- Number: 21

Playing career^{1}
Years	Club	Games (Goals)
2023–	Melbourne	23 (22)
- ^{1} Playing statistics correct to the end of the 2026 season.

Matthew Jefferson (born 8 March 2004) is a professional Australian rules footballer playing for the Melbourne Football Club in the Australian Football League (AFL). A key forward, he is 1.95 metres (6 ft 5 in) tall. He made his debut in the three point loss to Greater Western Sydney at the Melbourne Cricket Ground in round 1 of the 2025 season.

== Statistics ==
Updated to the end of the 2026 season.

Legend
G	Goals	K	Kicks	D	Disposals	T	Tackles
B	Behinds	H	Handballs	M	Marks

Season	Team	No.	Games	Totals							Averages (per game)							Votes
Season	Team	No.	Games	G	B	K	H	D	M	T	G	B	K	H	D	M	T	Votes
2023	Melbourne	21	0	—	—	—	—	—	—	—	—	—	—	—	—	—	—	0
2024	Melbourne	21	0	—	—	—	—	—	—	—	—	—	—	—	—	—	—	0
2025	Melbourne	12	7	4	4	22	16	38	13	9	0.6	0.6	3.1	2.3	5.4	1.9	1.3	0
2026	Melbourne	12	16	18	15	70	51	121	46	22	1.1	0.9	4.4	3.2	7.6	2.9	1.4	0
Career			23	22	19	92	67	159	92	31	1.0	0.8	4.0	2.9	6.9	2.6	1.4	0
