= Jobe Shanahan =

Australian rules footballer (born 2006)

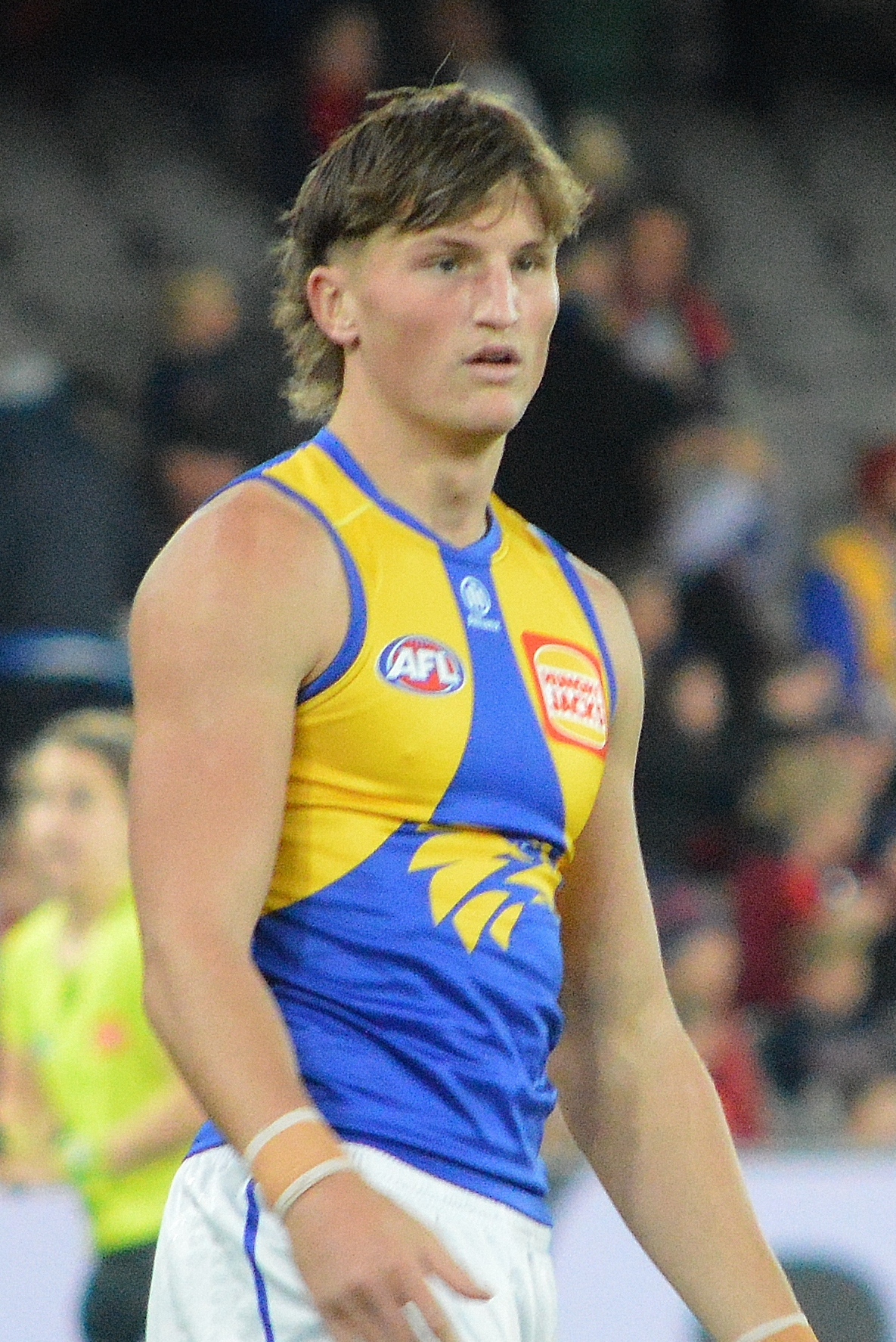
- Shanahan in May 2026

Personal information
- Full name: Jobe Shanahan
- Nickname: Shanahands
- Born: 2 August 2006 (age 20)
- Original team: Bendigo U18
- Draft: No. 30, 2024 AFL draft
- Debut: Round 16, 2025, West Coast vs. Collingwood, at Marvel Stadium
- Height: 195 cm (6 ft 5 in)
- Weight: 87 kg (192 lb)
- Position: Key Forward

Club information
- Current club: West Coast
- Number: 35

Playing career^{1}
Years	Club	Games (Goals)
2025–	West Coast	30 (41)
- ^{1} Playing statistics correct to the end of round 22, 2026.

Career highlights
- AFL Rising Star nominee: 2026

Jobe Shanahan (born 2 August 2006) is an Australian rules footballer who plays for the West Coast Eagles in the Australian Football League (AFL).

Shanahan was recruited from Bendigo Pioneers with pick 30 in the 2024 National Draft. He made his AFL debut in round 16 of the 2025 AFL season, kicking one goal on debut against Collingwood at Docklands Stadium.

== Early career ==
A native of Moama, New South Wales, Shanahan first drew attention in 2022 as a 15-year-old, kicking 60 goals for Moama’s Under-17s while debuting for their senior side, where he added 13 goals across 12 games, including finals. That same year, he began his association with the Bendigo Pioneers, appearing in a futures game against the Geelong Falcons. In 2023, Shanahan cemented his status as a rising prospect, playing 13 games with the Pioneers while also starring for NSW-ACT at Under-17 level and featuring in the AFL Futures Showcase on Grand Final day. His 2024 campaign elevated him into elite draft conversations: named in the National Academy, he produced 22 goals in 11 NAB League appearances, including a standout six-goal performance against the Murray Bushrangers. Shanahan also impressed in AFL Academy showcase matches and particularly at VFL level, where he kicked 11 goals in three appearances with Essendon’s reserves.

== AFL career ==
=== 2025: Debut season ===
Shanahan was selected with pick 30 in the 2024 National Draft by the West Coast Eagles. He made his WAFL debut for the West Coast Eagles reserves in Round 1 of the 2025 WAFL Season, where he scored one goal and had seven disposals in a 49 point loss to East Fremantle at East Fremantle Oval. He made his AFL debut in round 16 of the 2025 AFL season, kicking one goal in a 29 point loss against Collingwood at Docklands Stadium. He played the remaining nine games of the season kicking nine goals, finishing his debut season with three goals against Sydney at Perth Stadium in Round 24.

=== 2026 ===
In round 2 of the 2026 AFL season, Shanahan kicked two goals from 14 disposals to earn himself a nomination for the 2026 AFL Rising Star award.

== Statistics ==
Updated to the end of round 22, 2026.

Legend
G	Goals	K	Kicks	D	Disposals	T	Tackles
B	Behinds	H	Handballs	M	Marks

Season	Team	No.	Games	Totals							Averages (per game)							Votes
Season	Team	No.	Games	G	B	K	H	D	M	T	G	B	K	H	D	M	T	Votes
2025	West Coast	35	9	12	9	52	17	69	36	13	1.3	1.0	5.8	1.9	7.7	4.0	1.4	0
2026	West Coast	35	21	29	14	122	62	184	99	28	1.4	0.7	5.8	3.0	8.8	4.7	1.3	0
Career			30	41	23	174	79	253	135	41	1.4	0.8	5.8	2.6	8.4	4.5	1.4	0
