= Patrick Retschko =

Australian rules footballer

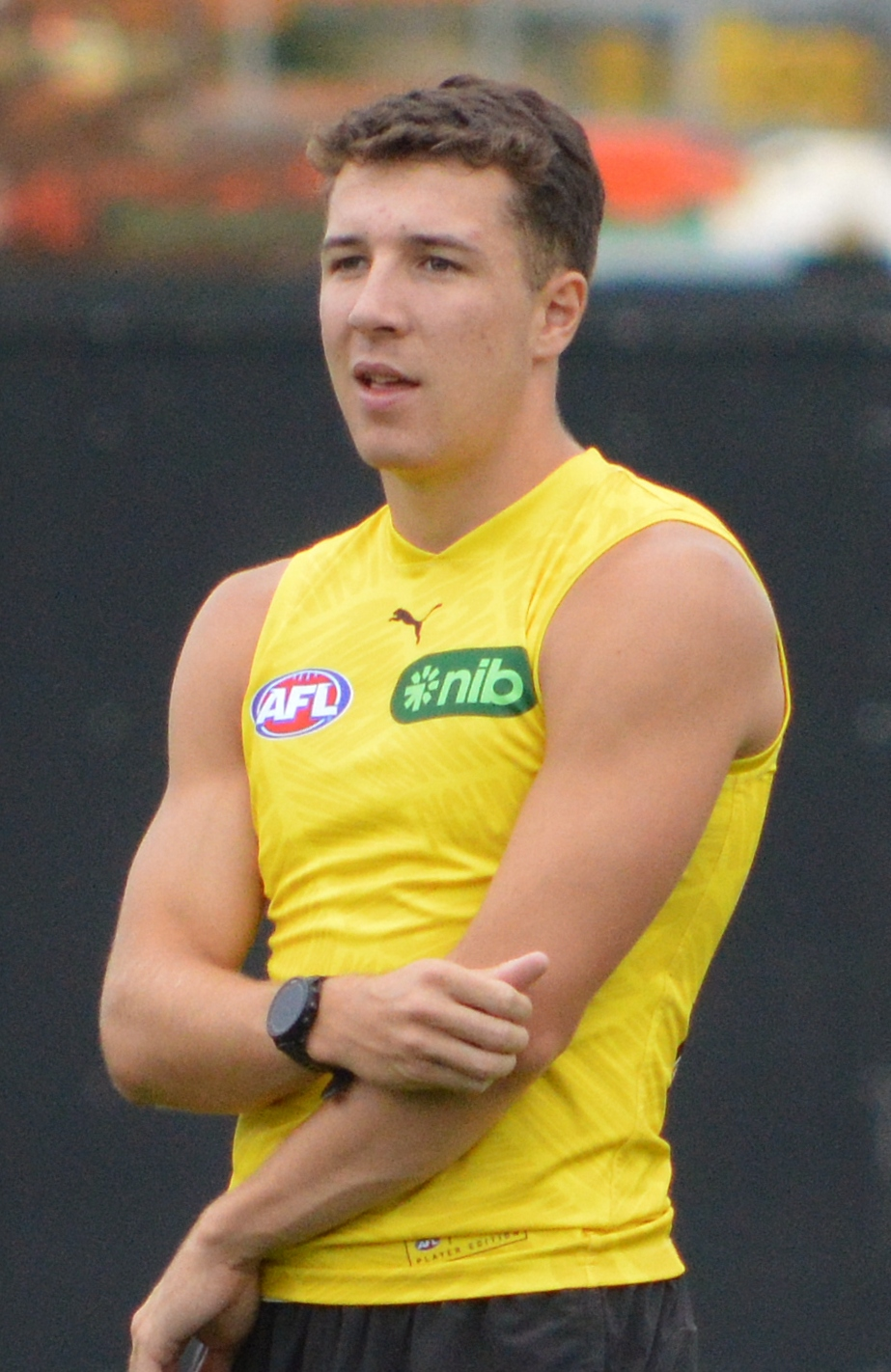
- Retschko in March 2026

Personal information
- Born: 28 February 2006 (age 20)
- Original teams: East Malvern Junior Football Club (SMJFL); St Kilda City Football Club (SFNL); Oakleigh Chargers (Talent League)
- Draft: No. 23, 2025 rookie draft
- Debut: Round 6, 2026, Richmond vs. North Melbourne, at Marvel Stadium
- Height: 186 cm (6 ft 1 in)
- Position: Wing

Club information
- Current club: Richmond
- Number: 33

Playing career^{1}
Years	Club	Games (Goals)
2025	Geelong	0 (0)
2026–	Richmond	18 (1)
Total		18 (1)
- ^{1} Playing statistics correct to the end of 2026.

Career highlights
- AFL Rising Star nominee: 2026

Patrick Retschko (born 28 February 2006) is an Australian rules footballer who plays for the Richmond Football Club in the Australian Football League (AFL). A hard-running winger, Retschko was drafted by Geelong in the second round of the 2025 rookie draft. He was traded to Richmond after being notionally de-listed by Geelong at the end of the 2025 season, in which he failed to make a debut at AFL level.

== Early life and junior football ==
Born to father Paul and mother Kelly, Retschko was raised in Malvern East, a suburb 12km south-east of Melbourne.

He played junior football for the East Malvern Junior Football Club in the South Metro Junior Football League, before joining St Kilda City Football Club in the Southern Football Netball League. Retschko attended high school at Caulfield Grammar School and played for the school's football team in the Associated Public Schools of Victoria league. He also captained the team in his final year of schooling.

Retschko first played representative football for Victoria at under 12 level and played with the Oakleigh Chargers junior development program across his teenage years. During this time, Retschko was also accomplished as middle-distance runner in athletics, winning three state titles in 800 metres as well as the national title for the same event in his under 13 year.

Retschko played top level state junior football with the Oakleigh Chargers in the Talent League in both 2023 and 2024, averaging 16.9 disposals across nine games in the 2024 season where the Chargers reached a preliminary final. He also played for Vic Metro in the Under 18 Championships in 2024, with an average of 17 disposals a game. He represented the Victoria Metropolitan region at the 2024 Under 18 national championships and featured in three matches, recording 17 disposals per game.

He was not invited to the national draft combine ahead of the 2024 AFL draft, but recorded a time of six minutes and seven seconds in the 2km time trial at the Victorian state combine, which would have placed him second had he attended the national event.

== AFL career ==
=== Geelong (2025) ===
After being overlooked by all 18 clubs in the national draft earlier that same week, Retschko was drafted by Geelong with the club's second pick and the 23rd selection overall in the 2025 rookie draft.

He failed to make a debut at AFL level in 2025, instead spending the entirety of the season with the club's reserves side in the VFL. He finished the season having played 18 matches for that side, placing fourth on the goal kicking tally (13), second on the total disposals tally (379) and averaging 21.6 disposals and four marks per game. Retschko placed fifth in the VFL team best and fairest award, ranking second among players also listed with the AFL side. Geelong announced the club would de-list him at the end of the 2025 season.

=== Richmond (2026–present) ===
Despite having already agreed to join Richmond as a delisted free agent in the forthcoming November signing period, the club opted to acquire him via a trade for draft pick number 99 in the exchange period in October 2025, before his de-listing by Geelong had officially been lodged.

Retschko made his first appearances for the club in two pre-season matches in February 2026, before missing selection for the team's round 1 AFL side. He featured in three VFL matches in March and April, recording an average of 23.7 disposals per game before being selected to make his AFL debut in round 6 of the 2026 season, in a match against North Melbourne at Marvel Stadium. Retschko was nominated for the AFL Rising Star in Round 11, following a 27-disposal game against Essendon in Dreamtime at the 'G.

== Player profile ==
Retschko plays as a wing, notable for his endurance running power and speed across middle distances.

== Statistics ==
Updated to the end of round 22, 2026.

Legend
G	Goals	K	Kicks	D	Disposals	T	Tackles
B	Behinds	H	Handballs	M	Marks

Season	Team	No.	Games	Totals							Averages (per game)							Votes
Season	Team	No.	Games	G	B	K	H	D	M	T	G	B	K	H	D	M	T	Votes
2025	Geelong	27	0	—	—	—	—	—	—	—	—	—	—	—	—	—	—	0
2026	Richmond	33	16	1	3	177	120	297	79	33	0.1	0.2	11.1	7.5	18.6	4.9	2.1	0
Career			16	1	3	177	120	297	79	33	0.1	0.2	11.1	7.5	18.6	4.9	2.1	0
