= Phoenix Gothard =

Australian rules footballer (born 2005)

Personal information
- Born: 7 September 2005 (age 21)
- Original teams: Murray Bushrangers (Talent League); St. Patricks JFC
- Draft: No. 12, 2023 national draft
- Debut: Opening Round, 2026, Greater Western Sydney vs. Hawthorn, at Sydney Showground Stadium
- Height: 179 cm (5 ft 10 in)
- Position: Small forward / midfielder

Club information
- Current club: Greater Western Sydney
- Number: 11

Playing career^{1}
Years	Club	Games (Goals)
2024–	Greater Western Sydney	16 (18)
- ^{1} Playing statistics correct to the end of round 22, 2026.

Career highlights
- Rising Star nominee: 2026

Phoenix Gothard (born 7 September 2005) is a professional Australian rules footballer who plays for the Greater Western Sydney Giants in the Australian Football League (AFL).

== Early life and junior football ==
Hailing from Albury, Gothard grew up with cricket as his number one sport, but eventually switched to Australian football.

He played his junior football for St Patricks Junior Football Club in the Albury Wodonga Junior Football League, and went on to represent the Murray Bushrangers in the Talent League (where he met future AFL opponent Connor O'Sullivan) and the Allies.

== AFL career ==
Gothard was drafted by the Greater Western Sydney with the twelfth pick overall in the 2023 national draft. He attended the national draft at Docklands Stadium not as a draft hopeful, but as a friend of eleventh-pick Connor O'Sullivan, and was therefore surprised to hear his name called.

He played the entirety of his first two seasons at Victorian Football League (VFL) level, representing Greater Western Sydney's reserves team. Gothard finally earned his chance following his third pre-season, making his senior debut in the opening round match against Hawthorn in 2026, 838 days after being drafted. In Round Six, he recorded 20 disposals and two goals in the Sydney Derby to earn a Rising Star nomination. Playing as a half-forward, Gothard set a new personal-best record in Round 11 with 29 disposals, two goals and 10 tackles in the win against the reigning premiers, Brisbane Lions, also becoming the highest-rated player of the round. He would receive three Brownlow votes for this performance, the first votes of his career.

Gothard suffered a dislocated left shoulder in the club's Round 18 win over Geelong. The Giants elected to surgically repair Gothard's shoulder, ending his 2026 season.

== Statistics ==
Updated to the end of round 22, 2026.

Legend
G	Goals	K	Kicks	D	Disposals	T	Tackles
B	Behinds	H	Handballs	M	Marks

Season	Team	No.	Games	Totals							Averages (per game)							Votes
Season	Team	No.	Games	G	B	K	H	D	M	T	G	B	K	H	D	M	T	Votes
2024	Greater Western Sydney	29	0	—	—	—	—	—	—	—	—	—	—	—	—	—	—	0
2025	Greater Western Sydney	11	0	—	—	—	—	—	—	—	—	—	—	—	—	—	—	0
2026	Greater Western Sydney	11	16	18	12	104	125	229	31	59	1.1	0.8	6.5	7.8	14.3	1.9	3.7	0
Career			16	18	12	104	125	229	31	59	1.1	0.8	6.5	7.8	14.3	1.9	3.7	0
