= Riley Hamilton =

Australian rules footballer (born 2006)

Personal information
- Born: August 15, 2006 (age 20); Canberra, Australian Capital Territory
- Original teams: Ainslie (AFL Canberra); GWS Giants Academy
- Draft: Category B rookie selection
- Debut: Round 17, 2026, Greater Western Sydney vs. Fremantle, at Manuka Oval
- Height: 189 cm (6 ft 2 in)
- Position: Medium forward

Club information
- Current club: Greater Western Sydney
- Number: 43

Playing career^{1}
Years	Club	Games (Goals)
2026–	Greater Western Sydney	6 (2)
- ^{1} Playing statistics correct to the end of round 22, 2026.

Career highlights
- Rising Star nomination: 2026

Riley Hamilton (born August 15 2006) is a professional Australian rules footballer who plays for the Greater Western Sydney Giants in the Australian Football League (AFL).

== Early life ==
A product of the Giants Academy and originally from Canberra, Hamilton was recruited from the Ainslie Football Club, and made his first-grade debut for the Tricolours in 2024.

Due to an ACL injury, he was overlooked in the 2024 national draft. Despite this, he played 9 games for the GWS reserves at VFL level, and scored seven goals in four games for the Allies during the 2025 AFL U18 National Championships.

== AFL career ==
In the 2025 Rookie Draft, Hamilton was drafted as a category B rookie.

After a strong start to 2026 in the Giants' VFL team, Hamilton was selected to make his senior debut in his home town of Canberra during Round 17, 2026, against Fremantle. The following week, he kicked his first two goals in a comeback win over Geelong to earn himself a nomination for the 2026 Rising Star award.

== Personal life ==
Hamilton's older sisters, Lexi and Cynthia, play for the Sydney Swans in the AFLW.

== Statistics ==
Updated to the end of round 22, 2026.

Legend
G	Goals	K	Kicks	D	Disposals	T	Tackles
B	Behinds	H	Handballs	M	Marks

Season	Team	No.	Games	Totals							Averages (per game)							Votes
Season	Team	No.	Games	G	B	K	H	D	M	T	G	B	K	H	D	M	T	Votes
2026	Greater Western Sydney	43	6	2	7	33	19	52	9	19	0.3	1.2	5.5	3.2	8.7	1.5	3.2	0
Career			6	2	7	33	19	52	9	19	0.3	1.2	5.5	3.2	8.7	1.5	3.2	0
