= Billy Wilson (footballer, born 2005) =

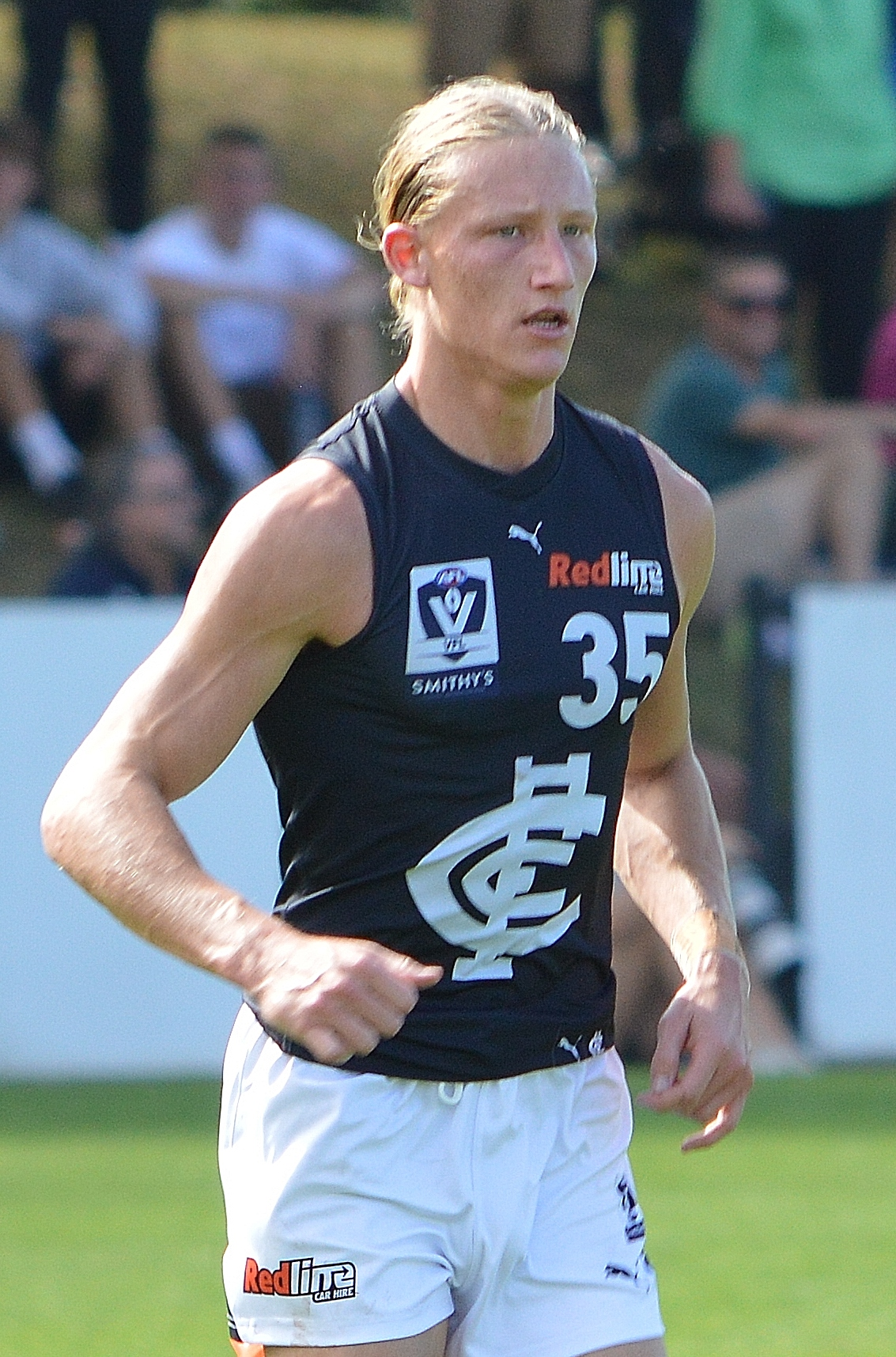
- Wilson with Carlton's VFL side in April 2025

Personal information
- Born: 16 June 2005 (age 21)
- Original team: Dromana/Dandenong Stingrays
- Draft: No. 34, 2023 AFL draft
- Debut: Round 16, 2025, Carlton vs. Port Adelaide, at Adelaide Oval
- Height: 183 cm (6 ft 0 in)
- Position: Defender

Club information
- Current club: Carlton
- Number: 15

Playing career^{1}
| Years | Club | Games (Goals) |
| 2024– | Carlton | 21 (0) |
- ^{1} Playing statistics correct to the end of the 2026 season.

Career highlights
- AFL Rising Star nominee: 2026

Billy Wilson (born 16 June 2005) is an Australian rules footballer who plays for the Carlton Football Club in the Australian Football League (AFL).

== Junior career ==
Wilson played for the Dandenong Stingrays in the Talent League. He averaged 22.5 disposals in his draft year. He was also a part of the Vic Country squad in the Under 18 Championships in 2023, averaging 11.8 disposals a game.

== AFL career ==
Wilson was selected by Carlton with pick 34 of the 2023 AFL draft. He played 13 games for Carlton's VFL side in an injury-interrupted first season after being drafted, and did not play a game of AFL.

Wilson made his debut in round 16 of the 2025 AFL season against Port Adelaide.

In July 2026, Wilson signed a two-year contract extension with Carlton to the end of 2028.

In round 24 of the 2026 AFL season, Wilson had 18 disposals to receive a nomination for the 2026 AFL Rising Star award.

== Statistics ==
Updated to the end of the 2026 season.

Legend
| G | Goals | K | Kicks | D | Disposals | T | Tackles |
| B | Behinds | H | Handballs | M | Marks |

| Season | Team | No. | Games | Totals | | | | | | | Averages (per game) | | | | | | | Votes |
| Season | Team | No. | Games | G | B | K | H | D | M | T | G | B | K | H | D | M | T | Votes |
|---|---|---|---|---|---|---|---|---|---|---|---|---|---|---|---|---|---|---|
| 2024 | Carlton | 35 | 0 | — | — | — | — | — | — | — | — | — | — | — | — | — | — | 0 |
| 2025 | Carlton | 35 | 4 | 0 | 0 | 29 | 19 | 48 | 13 | 8 | 0.0 | 0.0 | 7.3 | 4.8 | 12.0 | 3.3 | 2.0 | 0 |
| 2026 | Carlton | 15 | 17 | 0 | 1 | 220 | 119 | 339 | 86 | 33 | 0.0 | 0.1 | 12.9 | 7.0 | 19.9 | 5.1 | 1.9 | 0 |
| Career | | | 21 | 0 | 1 | 249 | 138 | 387 | 99 | 41 | 0.0 | 0.0 | 11.9 | 6.6 | 18.4 | 4.7 | 2.0 | 0 |
