= Yasmin Duursma =

Personal information
- Born: 30 March 2004 (age 22)
- Original team: Gippsland Power (Talent League Girls)
- Draft: No. 45, 2022 national draft
- Debut: Round 3, 2022 (S7), Port Adelaide vs. Carlton, at Princes Park
- Height: 175 cm (5 ft 9 in)
- Position: Midfielder

Club information
- Current club: Carlton
- Number: 11

Playing career^{1}
Years	Club	Games (Goals)
2022–2023	Port Adelaide	11 (0)
2025–	Carlton	14 (0)
Total		25 (0)
- ^{1} Playing statistics correct to the end of the 2025 season.

Yasmin Duursma (born 30 March 2004) is an Australian rules footballer playing for the Carlton Football Club in the AFL Women's (AFLW), having previously played with the Port Adelaide Football Club.

== Junior career ==
Duursma played in the Talent League Girls for the Gippsland Power. She also represented Vic Country in the Under 18 Championships.

== AFL career ==
Duursma was selected by Port Adelaide with pick 45 of the 2022 national draft. She made her debut in round 3 of 2022 AFL Women's season 7.

Duursma requested a trade to Carlton ahead of the 2024 AFLW season. In November of 2025, Duursma signed a contract extension to the end of 2027.

== Personal life ==
Duursma is the niece of former Sydney, Brisbane and Melbourne player Jamie Duursma. Duursma's siblings, Xavier Duursma, Zane Duursma, and Willem Duursma, also play Australian rules football professionally.

Duursma was previously in a public relationship with West Coast AFL star Harley Reid from early in 2024 to mid-2025.
