= Ty Gallop =

Australian rules footballer

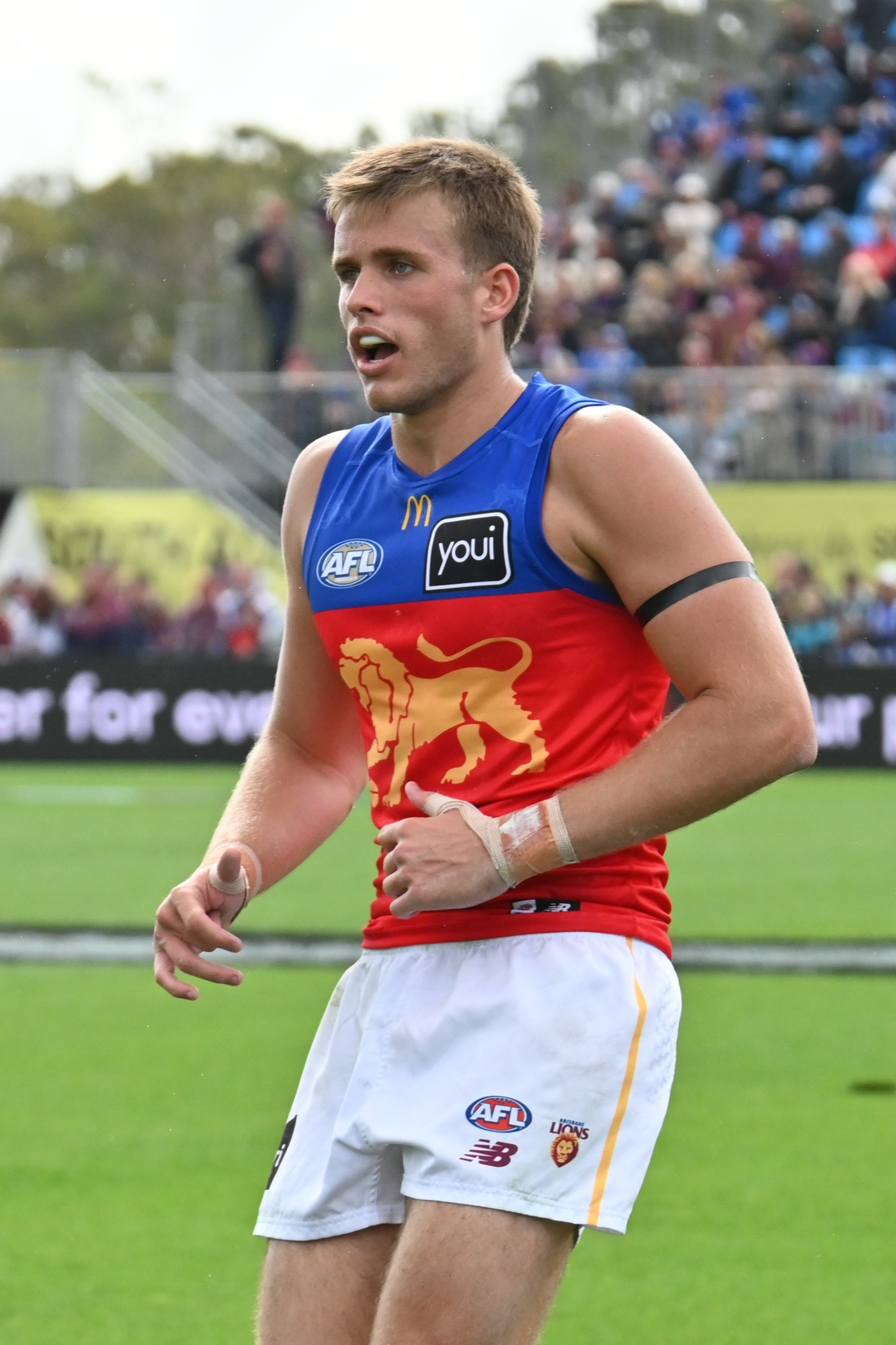
- Gallop in April 2026

Personal information
- Full name: Ty Gallop
- Born: 9 February 2006 (age 20)
- Original teams: Maroochydore (QAFL); Brisbane Lions Academy; Kawana Park JAFC
- Draft: No. 42, 2024 AFL draft
- Debut: Round 13, Brisbane Lions vs. Adelaide, at Adelaide Oval
- Height: 194 cm (6 ft 4 in)
- Position: Forward / Defender

Club information
- Current club: Brisbane Lions
- Number: 22

Playing career^{1}
Years	Club	Games (Goals)
2025–	Brisbane Lions	23 (5)
- ^{1} Playing statistics correct to the end of round 22, 2026.

Career highlights
- 2× AFL premiership player: 2025, 2026; Rising Star nominee: 2026

Ty Gallop (born 9 February 2006) is an Australian rules footballer who currently plays for the Brisbane Lions in the Australian Football League (AFL).

== Early life ==
Gallop was raised in Seaford, Victoria, growing up a keen soccer fan before moving to the Sunshine Coast at the age of 9. There he played for Kawana Park JAFC where he played juniors alongside Sam Marshall. Gallop attended Mountain Creek State High School playing in the AFL Queensland Schools Cup. After playing for Kawana Park's Under 16 team in 2021 as a 15-year old, he then played for Wilston Grange in 2022 and Maroochydore in 2023 and 2024 in the Queensland Australian Football League while developing in the Brisbane Lions Academy.

In 2024, he was selected to represent the Brisbane Lions in the Northern Academy Series and the Talent League, earning him selection for the under-18 Allies side in the AFL National Championships. Off the back of his performance for the Allies, Gallop was selected to represent the Brisbane Lions reserves in the 2024 preliminary final of the Victorian Football League (VFL) against Werribee. His outstanding junior year for Maroochydore was also rewarded with the 2024 QAFL Rising Star award.

== AFL career ==
After impressing the coaching staff at VFL level, Gallop was drafted to the Brisbane Lions as an academy selection with pick 42 in the 2024 national draft. Prior to making his debut, Gallop extended his maiden contract by a further year.

Gallop debuted for the Brisbane Lions in round 13 of the 2025 AFL season against the Adelaide Crows. Gallop had a break-out finals series, becoming a mainstay in Brisbane's team. He kicked his first career goal in the semi-final against Gold Coast, and then another three in the preliminary final against Collingwood, becoming the highest rated player on the ground in the latter match. In just his sixth AFL match, Gallop played in Brisbane's 2025 AFL Grand Final winning team, becoming a premiership player in his first season in the league.

In 2026, Gallop made the positional move to defence. Previously, he had only ever played in the role during one QAFL match. He excelled in the role, and even when forward Oscar Allen was injured during the season, coach Chris Fagan continued to persist with Gallop in the backline. In round 16, his form was rewarded with a nomination for the 2026 AFL Rising Star award.

== Statistics ==
Updated to the end of round 22, 2026.

Legend
G	Goals	K	Kicks	D	Disposals	T	Tackles
B	Behinds	H	Handballs	M	Marks
#	Played in that season's premiership team

Season	Team	No.	Games	Totals							Averages (per game)							Votes
Season	Team	No.	Games	G	B	K	H	D	M	T	G	B	K	H	D	M	T	Votes
2025^{#}	Brisbane Lions	22	6	4	2	23	29	52	17	18	0.7	0.3	3.8	4.8	8.7	2.8	3.0	0
2026^{#}	Brisbane Lions	22	17	1	3	134	27	161	83	37	0.1	0.2	7.9	1.6	9.5	4.9	2.2	0
Career			23	5	5	157	56	213	100	55	0.2	0.2	6.8	2.4	9.3	4.3	2.4	0
