= Jesse Dattoli =

Australian rules footballer (born 2006)

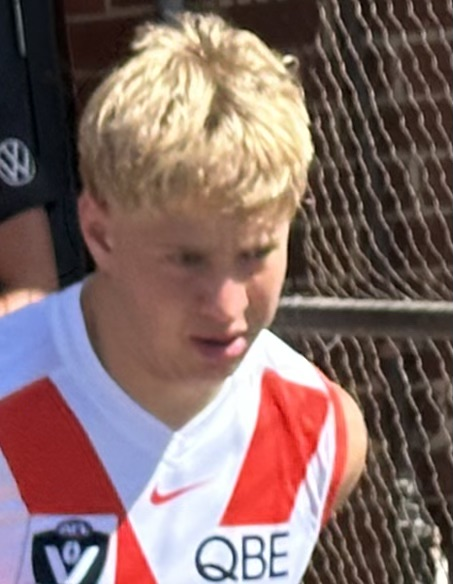
- Dattoli in April 2026

Personal information
- Born: 7 August 2006 (age 20)
- Original teams: Northern Knights (Talent League); Ivanhoe (NFNL)
- Draft: No. 22, 2024 national draft
- Debut: Round 21, 2025, Sydney vs. Essendon, at the SCG
- Height: 180 cm (5 ft 11 in)
- Position: Midfielder/Forward

Club information
- Current club: Sydney
- Number: 9

Playing career^{1}
Years	Club	Games (Goals)
2025–	Sydney	4 (2)
- ^{1} Playing statistics correct to the end of round 22, 2026.

Career highlights
- Rising Star nominee: 2026

Jesse Dattoli (born 7 August 2006) is an Australian rules footballer who plays for the Sydney Swans in the Australian Football League (AFL).

== Early life ==
Dattoli attended school at Carey Baptist Grammar School. By year nine, he was part of the school's top side.

== Junior career ==
Dattoli played junior football for Ivanhoe in the Yarra Junior Football League. At the age of sixteen, after a strong performance for Ivanhoe, Dattoli joined the Northern Knights in the Talent League. In his first year in the Talent League, Dattoli averaged 12.8 disposals and 1.3 goals a game. In his draft year, he averaged 23 disposals and 1.7 goals a game.

Dattoli was also part of the Vic Metro line-up in the Under 18 Championships. He averaged over 15 disposals and kicked three goals in 2024.

== AFL career ==
Dattoli was selected by the Sydney Swans with pick 22 of the 2024 AFL draft. He made his debut in round 21 of the 2025 AFL season against Essendon.

He made a rare appearance late in the 2026 season against Port Adelaide, and capitalised on the opportunity with 23 disposals and two goals. His performance earned him a nomination for the 2026 AFL Rising Star award.

== Statistics ==
Updated to the end of round 22, 2026.

Legend
G	Goals	K	Kicks	D	Disposals	T	Tackles
B	Behinds	H	Handballs	M	Marks

Season	Team	No.	Games	Totals							Averages (per game)							Votes
Season	Team	No.	Games	G	B	K	H	D	M	T	G	B	K	H	D	M	T	Votes
2025	Sydney	18	3	0	2	7	19	26	5	5	0.0	0.7	2.3	6.3	8.7	1.7	1.7	0
2026	Sydney	9	1	2	1	13	10	23	7	1	2.0	1.0	13.0	10.0	23.0	7.0	1.0	0
Career			4	2	3	20	29	49	12	6	0.5	0.8	5.0	7.3	12.3	3.0	1.5	0
