= Josh Lindsay =

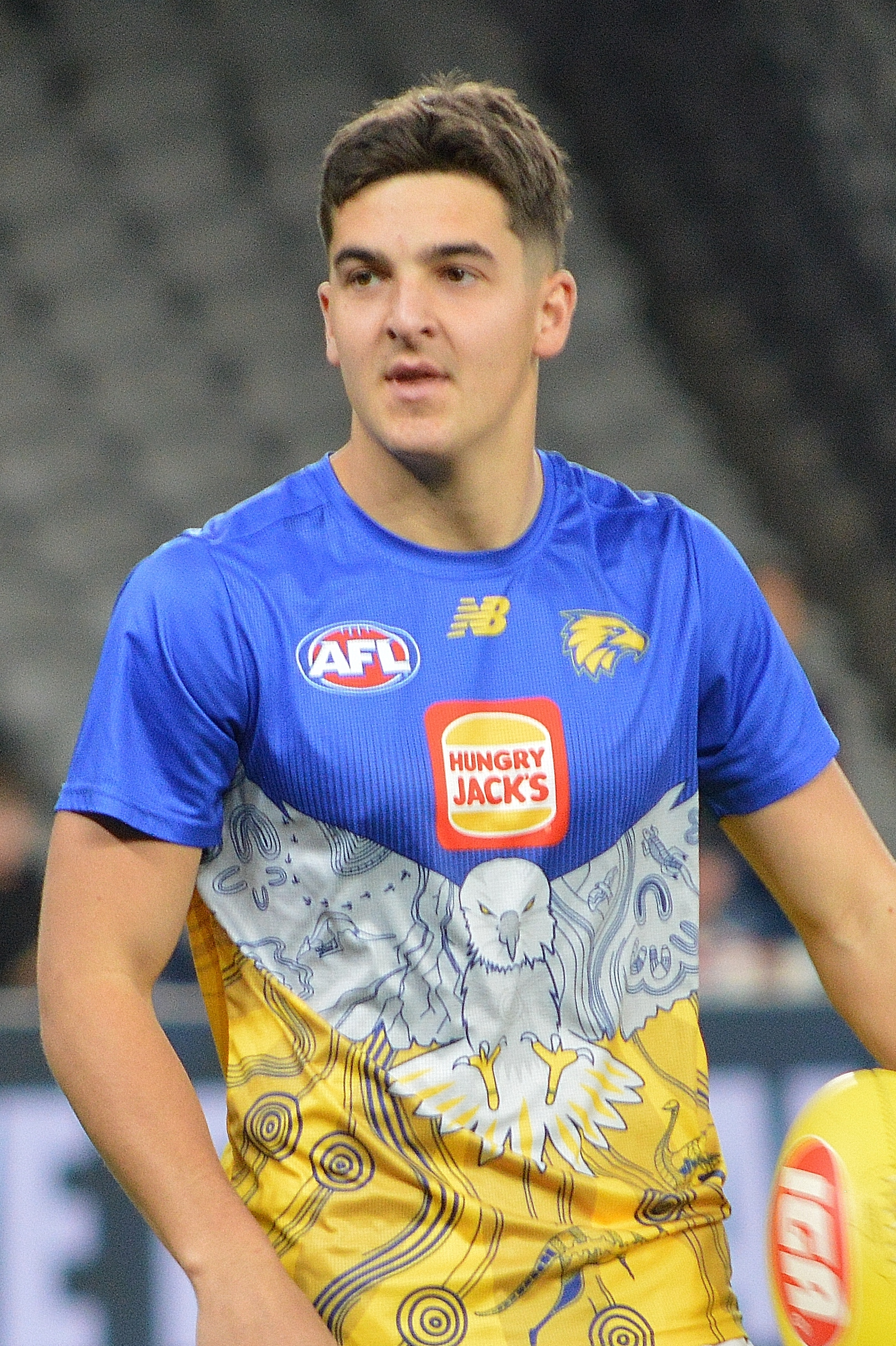
- Lindsay in May 2026

Personal information
- Full name: Joshua Lindsay
- Born: 7 April 2007 (age 19)
- Original team: Geelong Falcons (CTL)
- Draft: No. 19, 2025 AFL draft
- Debut: Round 1, 2026, West Coast vs. Gold Coast, at Carrara Stadium
- Height: 183 cm (6 ft 0 in)
- Position: Defender/Midfielder

Club information
- Current club: West Coast

Playing career^{1}
Years	Club	Games (Goals)
2026–	West Coast	13 (1)
- ^{1} Playing statistics correct to the end of round 22, 2026.

Career highlights
- AFL Rising Star nominee: 2026

Joshua Lindsay (born 7 April 2007) is a professional Australian rules footballer who plays for the West Coast Eagles in the Australian Football League (AFL).

== Junior career ==
Lindsay played junior football with the Geelong Falcons in the Coates Talent League. During his draft year, he represented the AFL Academy and played in the National Under-17 Futures match, where he was named best on ground.

He was selected in the Coates Talent League Team of the Year and the Under-18 All-Australian team.

== AFL career ==
Lindsay was selected by the West Coast Eagles with pick 19 in the 2025 AFL draft. He made his debut in the 2026 AFL season against the Gold Coast Suns at Carrara Stadium.

== Statistics ==
Updated to the end of round 22, 2026.

Legend
G	Goals	K	Kicks	D	Disposals	T	Tackles
B	Behinds	H	Handballs	M	Marks

Season	Team	No.	Games	Totals							Averages (per game)							Votes
Season	Team	No.	Games	G	B	K	H	D	M	T	G	B	K	H	D	M	T	Votes
2026	West Coast	5	13	1	0	184	72	256	54	15	0.1	0.0	14.2	5.5	19.7	4.2	1.2	0
Career			13	1	0	184	72	256	54	15	0.1	0.0	14.2	5.5	19.7	4.2	1.2	0
