= Jagga Smith =

Personal information
- Born: 28 January 2006 (age 20)
- Original team: Oakleigh Chargers
- Draft: No. 3, 2024 AFL draft
- Debut: Opening Round, 2026, Carlton vs. Sydney, at the SCG
- Height: 182 cm (6 ft 0 in)
- Position: Midfielder

Club information
- Current club: Carlton
- Number: 7

Playing career^{1}
| Years | Club | Games (Goals) |
| 2025– | Carlton | 25 (10) |
- ^{1} Playing statistics correct to the end of the 2026 season.

Career highlights
- AFL Rising Star: 2026; 22under22 team: 2026; Robert Walls Medal: 2026

Jagga Smith (born 28 January 2006) is a professional Australian rules footballer who plays for the Carlton Football Club in the Australian Football League (AFL).

== Junior career ==
Smith grew up in Richmond and began playing junior football at the Richmond Junior Football Club in the Yarra Junior Football League. Smith played for the Oakleigh Chargers in the Coates Talent League during 2023 and 2024. In 2024, he captained the Chargers, won its best and fairest and placed third in the Morrish Medal. He also played in the Under 18 Championships for Vic Metro, captaining the team to the championship in 2024. He played three games for the Richmond reserves in the VFL as 23rd man during the year.

== AFL career ==
=== 2025 ===
Smith was selected by the Carlton Football Club with pick 3 of the 2024 AFL draft. Carlton, which rated him the best player of the draft, had traded up in the first round order to ensure it could secure him. He received guernsey No. 7, which was Smith’s number at Oakleigh. He had been impressive during the preseason and was expected to make a round 1 debut, before rupturing his anterior cruciate ligament in his first interclub practice match, and missing the entirety of the 2025 season.

=== 2026 ===
Smith made his debut against the Sydney Swans in Opening Round of the 2026 AFL season. He had 27 disposals on debut. The next week in round 1, Smith tallied 32 disposals and 11 score involvements to receive a nomination for the 2026 AFL Rising Star award.

On 26 March, Smith signed a contract extension to the end of 2030. In round 21 of the 2026 season, against Brisbane, Smith had 29 disposals and kicked two goals to win the Robert Walls Medal as best on ground.

After a strong debut season, Smith was named in the 2026 22 Under 22 team. On 25 August, Smith was named the winner of the AFL Rising Star award for the 2026 season.

== Personal life ==
Smith's father Michael was drafted by Collingwood in the 1988 VFL Draft with pick 53, however he did not play a senior game for the team.

Smith attended primary school at Richmond Primary School in Melbourne. He completed his high school studies at Scotch College in Melbourne in 2023, where he became close friends with Carlton teammate Cooper Lord. He returned to the school as an assistant coach to the First 18 football team during the 2025 season.

== Statistics ==
Updated to the end of the 2026 season.

Legend
| G | Goals | K | Kicks | D | Disposals | T | Tackles |
| B | Behinds | H | Handballs | M | Marks |

| Season | Team | No. | Games | Totals | | | | | | | Averages (per game) | | | | | | | Votes |
| Season | Team | No. | Games | G | B | K | H | D | M | T | G | B | K | H | D | M | T | Votes |
|---|---|---|---|---|---|---|---|---|---|---|---|---|---|---|---|---|---|---|
| 2025 | Carlton | 7 | 0 | — | — | — | — | — | — | — | — | — | — | — | — | — | — | 0 |
| 2026 | Carlton | 7 | 25 | 10 | 7 | 261 | 361 | 622 | 77 | 68 | 0.4 | 0.3 | 10.4 | 14.4 | 24.9 | 3.1 | 2.7 | 12 |
| Career | | | 25 | 10 | 7 | 261 | 361 | 622 | 77 | 68 | 0.4 | 0.3 | 10.4 | 14.4 | 24.9 | 3.1 | 2.7 | 12 |
