= Xavier Duursma =

Australian rules footballer (born 2000)

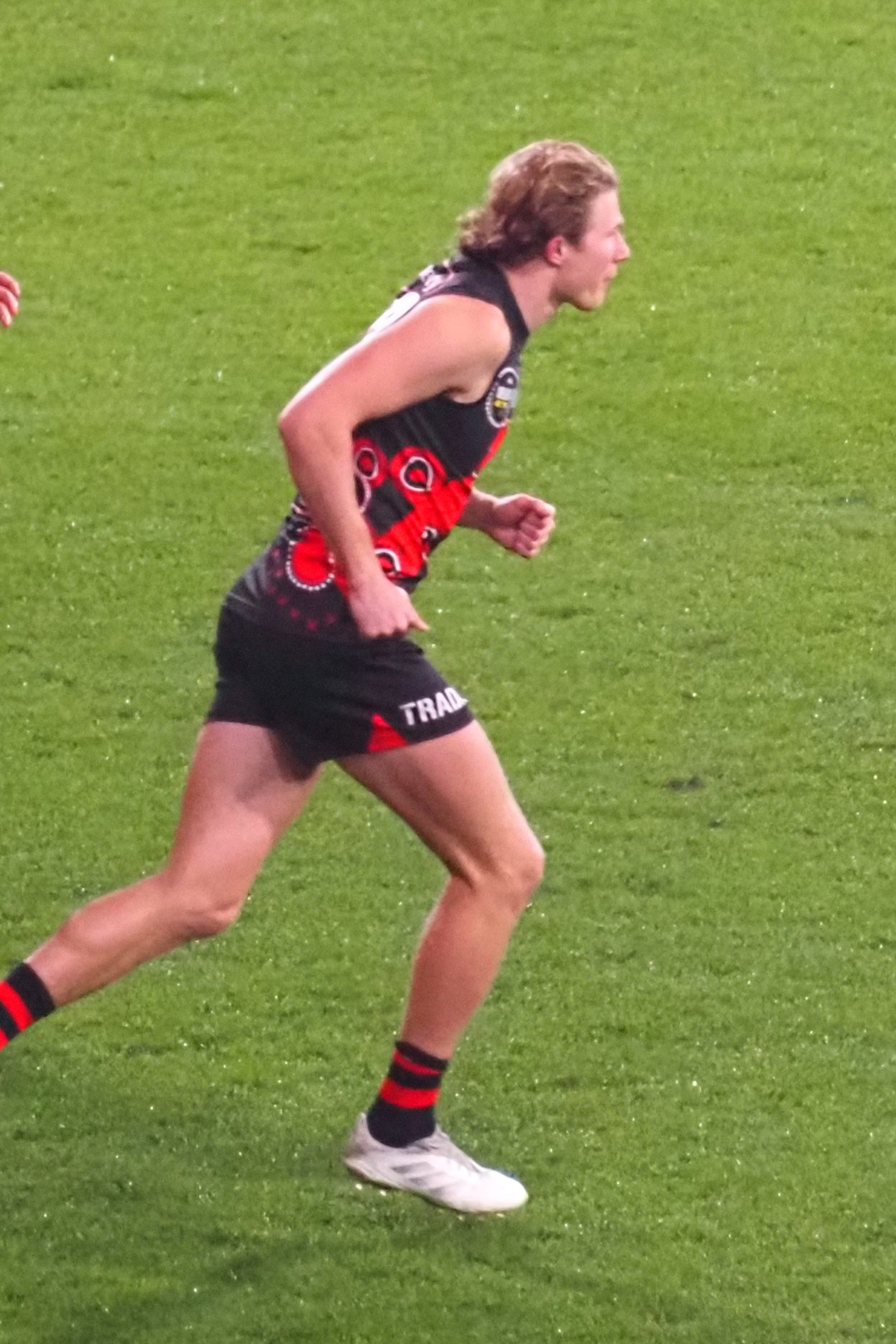
- Duursma playing for Essendon in 2025

Personal information
- Full name: Xavier Duursma
- Born: 7 July 2000 (age 26)
- Original team: Gippsland Power (TAC Cup)/Foster Tigers
- Draft: No. 18, 2018 AFL draft, Port Adelaide
- Debut: Round 1, 2019, Port Adelaide vs. Melbourne, at Melbourne Cricket Ground
- Height: 186 cm (6 ft 1 in)
- Weight: 82 kg (181 lb)
- Position: Midfielder

Club information
- Current club: Essendon
- Number: 28

Playing career^{1}
Years	Club	Games (Goals)
2019–2023	Port Adelaide	73 (33)
2024–	Essendon	55 (27)
Total		128 (60)
- ^{1} Playing statistics correct to the end of round 22, 2026.

Career highlights
- AFL Rising Star nominee: 2019

Xavier Duursma (born 7 July 2000) is a professional Australian rules footballer who plays for the Essendon Football Club in the Australian Football League (AFL). He was drafted by Port Adelaide with the 18th pick in the 2018 AFL draft.

Duursma is a member of the Dutch team of the century.

== AFL career ==
Duursma made his AFL debut in Port Adelaide's win over Melbourne in the opening round of the 2019 AFL season. He scored a goal on debut. In Round 6, Duursma earned the Rising Star nomination, following Port's 16 point win over North Melbourne. He quickly became well known for his bow and arrow goal celebration.

Following the conclusion of the 2020 AFL season, which concluded with a preliminary final loss to Richmond, Duursma inherited the number seven guernsey from retired veteran Brad Ebert.

Duursma was traded from Port Adelaide to Essendon in a rare player-for-player swap with Brandon Zerk-Thatcher at the end of the 2023 AFL season.

== Personal life ==
Duursma is the nephew of former Sydney, Brisbane and Melbourne player Jamie Duursma. Both his brothers, Zane and Willem also play in the AFL for North Melbourne and West Coast respectively, while his sister Yasmin has played for Port Adelaide and Carlton in the AFLW.

He was educated at Foster Secondary College, where he was school captain in 2018. He played junior football for Foster Tigers in the Alberton Football League.

== Statistics ==
Updated to the end of round 22, 2026.

Legend
G	Goals	K	Kicks	D	Disposals	T	Tackles
B	Behinds	H	Handballs	M	Marks

Season	Team	No.	Games	Totals							Averages (per game)							Votes
Season	Team	No.	Games	G	B	K	H	D	M	T	G	B	K	H	D	M	T	Votes
2019	Port Adelaide	21	20	11	13	204	188	392	114	41	0.6	0.7	10.2	9.4	19.6	5.7	2.1	0
2020 (Note: The 2020 season was played with 17 home-and-away matches per team (down from 22) and 16-minute quarters with time on (down from 20-minute quarters with time on) due to the impact of the COVID-19 pandemic.)	Port Adelaide	21	15	7	3	115	83	198	52	36	0.5	0.2	7.7	5.5	13.2	3.5	2.4	0
2021	Port Adelaide	7	11	3	3	111	96	207	52	29	0.3	0.3	10.1	8.7	18.8	4.7	2.6	0
2022	Port Adelaide	7	11	6	1	84	62	146	43	20	0.5	0.1	7.6	5.6	13.3	3.9	1.8	0
2023	Port Adelaide	7	16	6	1	146	99	245	67	44	0.4	0.1	9.1	6.2	15.3	4.2	2.8	0
2024	Essendon	28	15	9	0	165	113	278	96	40	0.6	0.0	11.0	7.5	18.5	6.4	2.7	0
2025	Essendon	28	22	10	6	219	209	428	114	67	0.5	0.3	10.0	9.5	19.5	5.2	3.0	0
2026	Essendon	28	18	8	3	138	149	287	89	36	0.4	0.2	7.7	8.3	15.9	4.9	2.0	0
Career			128	60	30	1182	999	2181	627	313	0.5	0.2	9.2	7.8	17.0	4.9	2.4	0
