= Willem Duursma =

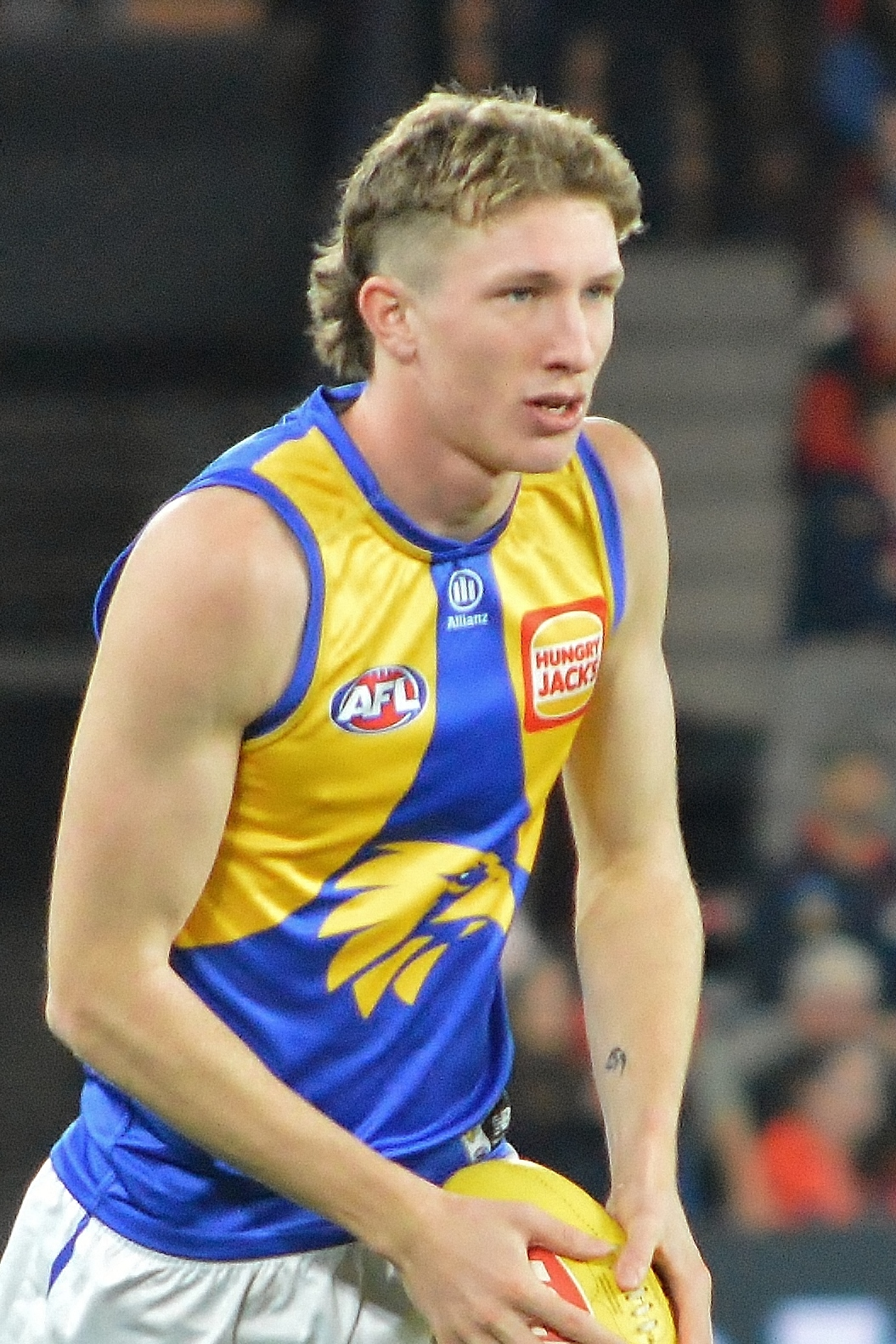
- Duursma in May 2026

Personal information
- Born: 21 June 2007 (age 19)
- Original team: Gippsland Power
- Draft: No. 1, 2025 AFL draft
- Debut: Round 1, 2026, West Coast vs. Gold Coast, at Carrara Stadium
- Height: 194 cm (6 ft 4 in)
- Position: Midfielder

Club information
- Current club: West Coast
- Number: 1

Playing career^{1}
Years	Club	Games (Goals)
2026–	West Coast	20 (14)
- ^{1} Playing statistics correct to the end of round 22, 2026.

Career highlights
- Allen Aylett Medal: 2025; AFL Rising Star nominee: 2026

Willem Duursma (born 21 June 2007) is a professional Australian rules footballer who plays for the West Coast Eagles in the Australian Football League (AFL).

== Junior career ==
Duursma played for Gippsland Power in the Talent League. In 2025 he averaged 23.5 disposals and 1.2 goals per game, and received the club's best and fairest award.

Duursma also represented Vic Country in the Under 18 Championships. Averaging 24.3 disposals per game, Duursma claimed Vic Country's MVP award and was named in the under 18 All Australian team.

== AFL career ==
Duursma's form in the Talent League and Under 18 Championships brought him into contention for the number one pick of the 2025 AFL draft. He was selected with pick 1 by the West Coast Eagles. He made his debut in round 1 of the 2026 AFL season.

In round 3 of the 2026 season, Duursma had 20 disposals and a goal to earn himself a nomination for the 2026 AFL Rising Star award.

== Personal life ==
Duursma is the nephew of former Sydney, Brisbane and Melbourne player Jamie Duursma. Duursma's siblings, Xavier Duursma, Zane Duursma, and Yasmin Duursma, also play Australian rules football professionally.

== Statistics ==
Updated to the end of round 22, 2026.

Legend
G	Goals	K	Kicks	D	Disposals	T	Tackles
B	Behinds	H	Handballs	M	Marks

Season	Team	No.	Games	Totals							Averages (per game)							Votes
Season	Team	No.	Games	G	B	K	H	D	M	T	G	B	K	H	D	M	T	Votes
2026	West Coast	1	20	14	8	203	149	352	86	65	0.7	0.4	10.2	7.5	17.6	4.3	3.3	0
Career			20	14	8	203	149	352	86	65	0.7	0.4	10.2	7.5	17.6	4.3	3.3	0
