= Sam Grlj =

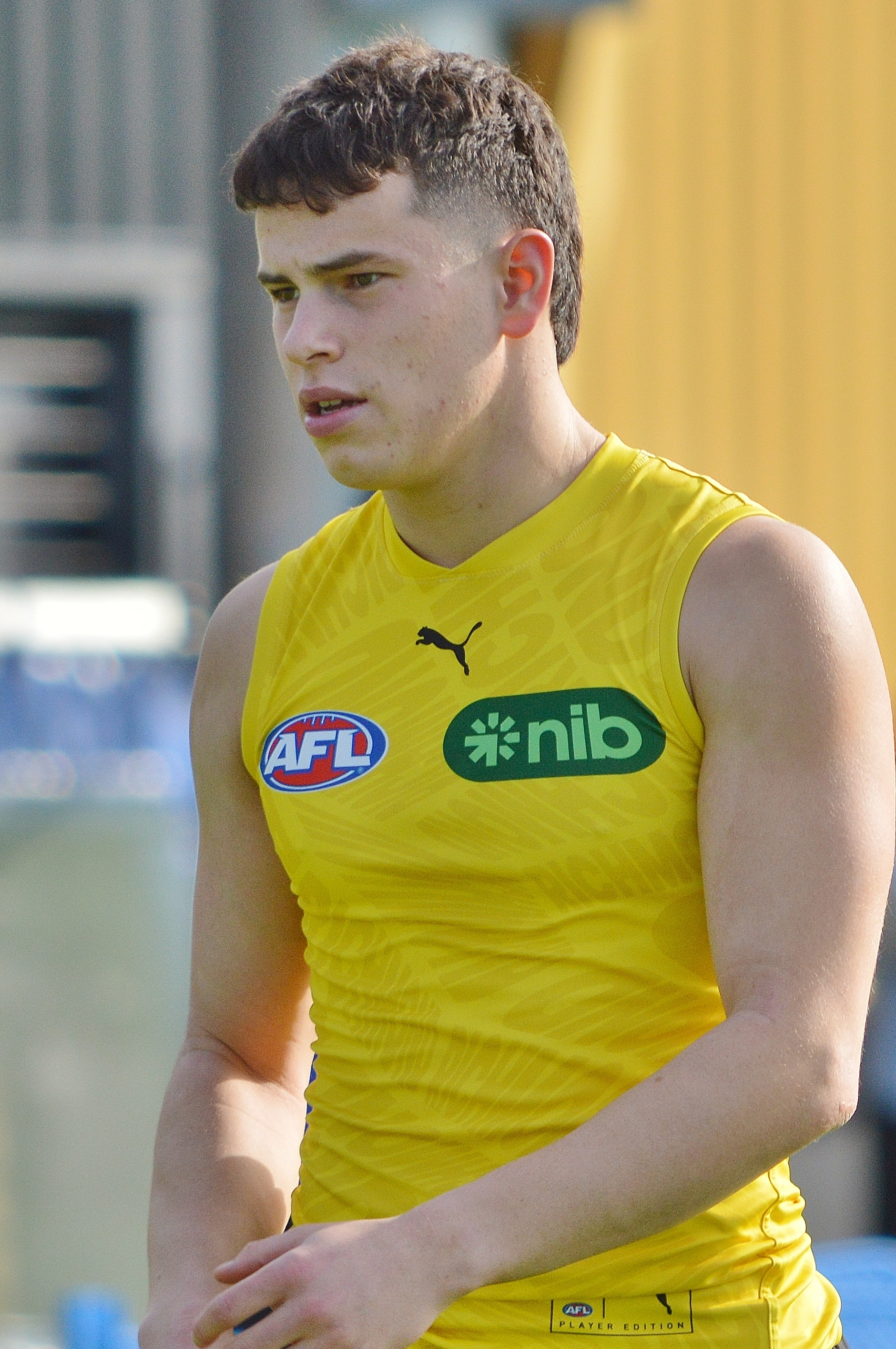
- Grlj in May 2026

Personal information
- Full name: Samuel Grlj
- Nicknames: Griller, Sizzle
- Born: 29 July 2007 (age 19)
- Original team: Oakleigh Chargers (Talent League)
- Draft: No. 8, 2025 AFL draft
- Debut: Round 1, 2026, Richmond vs. Carlton, at MCG
- Height: 182 cm (6 ft 0 in)
- Position: Half back

Club information
- Current club: Richmond
- Number: 24

Playing career^{1}
Years	Club	Games (Goals)
2026–	Richmond	21 (2)
- ^{1} Playing statistics correct to the end of 2026.

Career highlights
- AFL Rising Star nominee: 2026

Samuel Grlj (gril, born 26 July 2007) is a professional Australian rules footballer who plays for the Richmond Football Club in the Australian Football League (AFL). A quick rebounding defender, Grlj was drafted in the first round of the 2025 AFL draft and made his debut early in the 2026 season.

== Early life and junior football ==
Grlj was raised in Melbourne's eastern suburbs and played junior football with the Canterbury Cobras and the Kew Rovers in the Yarra Junior Football League. He later played junior representative football with the Oakleigh Chargers in the Talent League in 2024 and attended, played for and captained the football side at Camberwell Grammar School through 2025.

In the 2025 Talent League season, Grlj played seven matches, averaging 20.3 disposals and five tackles per game as a half-back and a midfielder. For his performances, he was selected to the Talent League Team of the Year as a half-back.

That same season, Grlj was selected to represent Victoria's metropolitan region at the 2025 AFL Under 18 Championships. He served as captain and played four matches with an average of 17 disposals per match.

Grlj also played two matches of state-league football in 2025, featuring with Richmond's VFL team and recording 18 and 15 disposals in those matches.

At the 2025 national draft combine, Grlj recorded the second fastest two kilometre time trial time (5 minutes, 59 seconds) and the ninth best time in the 20 metre sprint (2.926 seconds). Prior to the draft, Grlj was projected to be taken with the 14th overall pick by each of AFL Media, Fox Sports and ESPN.

== AFL career ==
Grlj was drafted by Richmond with the club's second selection and the eighth pick overall in the 2025 AFL draft. He made his first appearances for the club in two pre-season matches in February 2026. Grlj will make his AFL debut in round 1 of the 2026 season, in a match against Carlton at the MCG.

== Player profile ==
Grlj plays as a rebounding half-back. He is notable for his running speed, power and endurance.

== Personal life ==
Grlj's paternal family is of Italian, Macedonian and Slovenian heritage, with the name Grlj drawn from Slovenian elements of the family.

== Statistics ==
Updated to the end of round 22, 2026.

Legend
G	Goals	K	Kicks	D	Disposals	T	Tackles
B	Behinds	H	Handballs	M	Marks

Season	Team	No.	Games	Totals							Averages (per game)							Votes
Season	Team	No.	Games	G	B	K	H	D	M	T	G	B	K	H	D	M	T	Votes
2026	Richmond	24	19	1	4	148	122	270	51	50	0.1	0.2	7.8	6.4	14.2	2.7	2.6	0
Career			19	1	4	148	122	270	51	50	0.1	0.2	7.8	6.4	14.2	2.7	2.6	0
