= Jacob Farrow =

Personal information
- Born: 21 September 2007 (age 19)
- Original team: West Perth (WAFL)
- Draft: No. 10, 2025 AFL draft
- Debut: Round 3, 2026, Essendon vs. North Melbourne, at Marvel Stadium
- Height: 189 cm (6 ft 2 in)
- Position: Defender

Club information
- Current club: Essendon
- Number: 2

Playing career^{1}
Years	Club	Games (Goals)
2026–	Essendon	19 (4)
- ^{1} Playing statistics correct to the end of 2026.

Career highlights
- AFL Rising Star nominee: 2026

Jacob Farrow (born 21 September 2007) is a professional Australian rules footballer who plays for the Essendon Football Club in the Australian Football League (AFL).

== Junior career ==
Farrow played junior football with Joondalup Kinross Junior Football Club before progressing to West Perth in the West Australian Football League (WAFL). He was selected by Essendon with pick 10 in the 2025 AFL draft.

== AFL career ==
Farrow made his AFL debut in round 3 of the 2026 season against North Melbourne. In his debut, he recorded 13 disposals, 6 marks, and three tackles. In Round 5, in his third match, Farrow was nominated for the Rising Star award, after having 22 disposals and 12 marks in a win over Melbourne in Gather Round. Farrow finished the season strongly and despite having two more years remaining on his contract, extended it for a further two years to the end of 2030.

== Statistics ==
Updated to the end of 2026.

Legend
G	Goals	K	Kicks	D	Disposals	T	Tackles
B	Behinds	H	Handballs	M	Marks

Season	Team	No.	Games	Totals							Averages (per game)							Votes
Season	Team	No.	Games	G	B	K	H	D	M	T	G	B	K	H	D	M	T	Votes
2026	Essendon	2	21	4	3	225	145	370	128	37	0.2	0.1	10.7	6.9	17.6	6.1	1.8	TBA
Career			21	4	3	225	145	370	128	37	0.2	0.1	10.7	6.9	17.6	6.1	1.8	0
