= Dyson Sharp =

Australian rules footballer

Personal information
- Full name: Dyson Sharp
- Born: 23 May 2007 (age 19)
- Original team: Central Districts (SANFL)
- Draft: No. 13, 2025 national draft
- Debut: Round 1, 2026, Essendon vs. Hawthorn, at Melbourne Cricket Ground
- Height: 187 cm (6 ft 2 in)
- Position: Midfielder

Club information
- Current club: Essendon
- Number: 13

Playing career^{1}
Years	Club	Games (Goals)
2026–	Essendon	13 (3)
- ^{1} Playing statistics correct to the end of round 22, 2026.

Career highlights
- AFL Rising Star nominee: 2026; 2025 Larke Medal

Dyson Sharp (born 23 May 2007) is a professional Australian rules footballer. An inside midfielder, he was selected by the Essendon Football Club as pick 13 in the 2025 AFL draft.

== Early life ==
Dyson's early life was deeply rooted in South Australian football and a lifelong fan of the club he now plays for, the Essendon Football Club.

Sharp was raised in the Barrosa Valley region of South Australia. He is the son of Darren Sharp, a local footballer who played over 250 games and won four premierships with the Barossa District Football & Netball Club. He was still at high school at Xavier College in Gawler when he made his debut for Central District Football Club in the South Australian National Football League.

== AFL career ==
He made his AFL debut against Hawthorn at the MCG in round 1 of the 2026 AFL season, where the Bombers lost by 62 points. Sharp's season was interrupted a couple of times by injury, and after dislocating his shoulder in Round 9 against Greater Western Sydney, Sharp faced the prospect of going in for reparative surgery which would end his season, or strengthening it to get through the season and delaying surgery until the off-season. Sharp and the club opted for the latter, and Sharp returned for the second half of the season. In Round 19, Sharp was nominated for the Rising Star award after 23 disposals, 7 clearances, 5 tackles and a goal in the return match against the Giants, in only the club's second win of the season. Sharp finished the season strongly and despite having two more years remaining on his contract, extended it for a further two years to the end of 2030.

== Statistics ==
Updated to the end of round 22, 2026.

Legend
G	Goals	K	Kicks	D	Disposals	T	Tackles
B	Behinds	H	Handballs	M	Marks

Season	Team	No.	Games	Totals							Averages (per game)							Votes
Season	Team	No.	Games	G	B	K	H	D	M	T	G	B	K	H	D	M	T	Votes
2026	Essendon	15	13	3	1	113	108	221	47	44	0.2	0.1	8.7	8.3	17.0	3.6	3.4	0
Career			13	3	1	113	108	221	47	44	0.2	0.1	8.7	8.3	17.0	3.6	3.4	0
