= List of AFL debuts in 2026 =

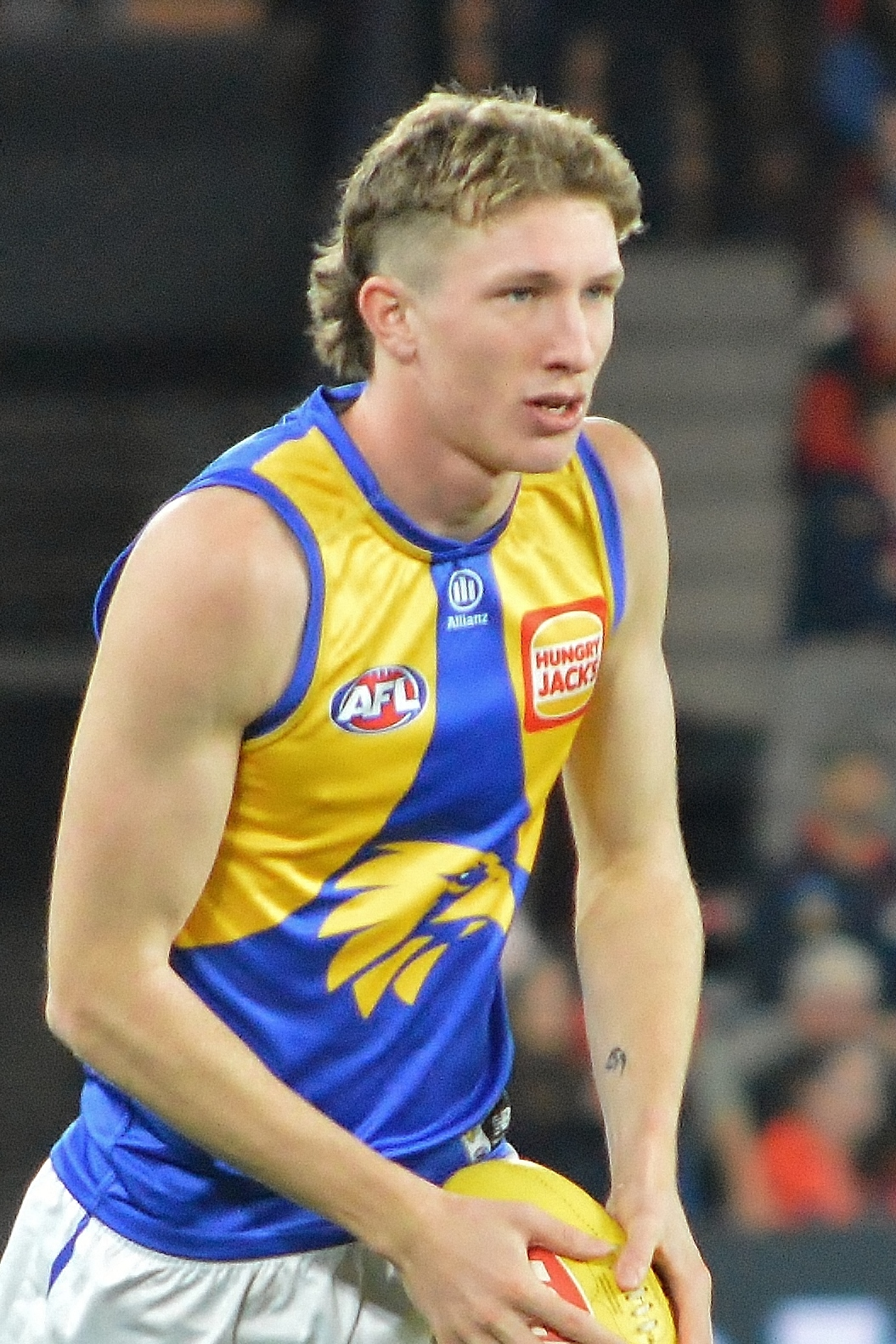
West Coast's Willem Duursma made his debut in round one

This is a list of players in the Australian Football League (AFL) who either made their AFL debut or played for a new club during the 2026 AFL season. Games and goals statistics are correct to the end of the 2026 season.

== Summary ==
Summary of debuts in 2026
Club	AFL debuts	Change of club
Adelaide	5	3
Brisbane Lions	3	2
Carlton	6	5
Collingwood	6	1
Essendon	6	1
Fremantle	2	2
Geelong	2	1
Gold Coast	4	2
Greater Western Sydney	5	2
Hawthorn	8	1
Melbourne	6	4
North Melbourne	3	1
Port Adelaide	6	3
Richmond	8	0
St Kilda	2	4
Sydney	4	3
West Coast	6	4
Western Bulldogs	7	1
Total	89	40

== AFL debuts ==
List of AFL debuts, with player name, club, player age at time of debut, round of debut, 2026 games totals, 2026 goals totals, and notes shown
Name	Club	Age at debut	Debut round	Games (in 2026)	Goals (in 2026)	Notes	Ref.
Harry Dean	Carlton	18 years, 112 days	Opening	22	1	Pick 3, 2025 national draft	
Jagga Smith	Carlton	20 years, 36 days	Opening	25	10	Pick 3, 2024 national draft	
Zeke Uwland	Gold Coast	18 years, 316 days	Opening	17	7	Pick 2, 2025 national draft	
Phoenix Gothard	Greater Western Sydney	20 years, 181 days	Opening	16	18	Pick 12, 2023 national draft	
Lachie Jaques	Western Bulldogs	19 years, 279 days	Opening	10	0	Pick 29, 2024 national draft	
Michael Sellwood	Western Bulldogs	22 years, 156 days	Opening	24	0	Pick 5, 2025 mid-season rookie draft	
Zane Zakostelsky	Brisbane Lions	20 years, 83 days	Opening	3	1	Pick 51, 2023 national draft	
Sam Grlj	Richmond	18 years, 229 days	1	21	2	Pick 8, 2025 national draft	
Hussien El Achkar	Essendon	18 years, 345 days	1	9	10	Pick 53, 2025 national draft	
Max Kondogiannis	Essendon	18 years, 119 days	1	12	1	Pick 36, 2025 national draft	
Dyson Sharp	Essendon	18 years, 294 days	1	15	3	Pick 13, 2025 national draft	
Will Lewis	Western Bulldogs	26 years, 313 days	1	13	15	Pre-season supplemental selection in 2026	
Mitchell Edwards	Geelong	20 years, 285 days	1	20	3	Pick 32, 2023 national draft	
Dan Annable	Brisbane Lions	18 years, 343 days	1	3	1	Pick 6, 2025 national draft	
Toby Murray	Adelaide	22 years, 132 days	1	13	9	Pick 7, 2024 mid-season rookie draft	
Lachy Dovaston	North Melbourne	18 years, 290 days	1	6	3	Pick 16, 2025 national draft	
Tom Blamires	North Melbourne	23 years, 214 days	1	17	3	Pre-season supplemental selection in 2026	
Jack Watkins	Port Adelaide	25 years, 87 days	1	1	3	Pick 4, 2026 rookie draft	
Latrelle Pickett	Melbourne	20 years, 77 days	1	16	10	Pick 12, 2025 national draft	
Cooper Duff-Tytler	West Coast	18 years, 205 days	1	16	4	Pick 4, 2025 national draft	
Willem Duursma	West Coast	18 years, 267 days	1	22	14	Pick 1, 2025 national draft	
Josh Lindsay	West Coast	18 years, 342 days	1	15	1	Pick 19, 2025 national draft	
Milan Murdock	West Coast	25 years, 258 days	1	20	19	Pre-season supplemental selection in 2026	
Chris Scerri	Fremantle	19 years, 258 days	2	9	1	Pre-season supplemental selection in 2026	
Oliver Hannaford	Greater Western Sydney	19 years, 207 days	3	5	2	Pick 18, 2024 national draft	
Oscar Steene	Collingwood		3	8	4	Pre-season supplemental selection in 2023	
Jacob Farrow	Essendon	18 years, 188 days	3	21	4	Pick 10, 2025 national draft	
Josh Lai	Port Adelaide	20 years, 179 days	3	19	0	Pre-season supplemental selection in 2025	
Talor Byrne	Carlton	18 years, 135 days	3	20	15	Pick 45, 2025 national draft	
Paddy Cross	Melbourne	23 years, 43 days	3	11	6	Pre-season supplemental selection in 2026	
Wade Derksen	Carlton	24 years, 289 days	4	15	0	Pre-season supplemental selection in 2026; previously listed with Greater Western Sydney	
Mitch Zadow	Port Adelaide	22 years, 24 days	4	9	8	Pre-season supplemental selection in 2026	
Jack Dalton	Hawthorn	19 years, 1 day	4	5	3	Pick 34, 2025 national draft	
Angus Anderson	Collingwood	22 years, 320 days	5	17	20	Pick 57, 2025 national draft	
Sullivan Robey	Essendon	18 years, 189 days	5	15	9	Pick 9, 2025 national draft	
Louis Emmett	Western Bulldogs	19 years, 19 days	5	7	0	Pick 27, 2025 national draft	
Oliver Hayes-Brown	Richmond	25 years, 349 days	5	7	1	Category B rookie selection in 2024	
Will McCabe	Hawthorn	19 years, 79 days	6	4	2	Pick 19, 2023 national draft	
Charlie Edwards	Adelaide	20 years, 335 days	6	2	0	Pick 21, 2023 national draft	
Patrick Retschko	Richmond	20 years, 50 days	6	18	1	Traded in 2025; previously listed with Geelong	
Xavier Taylor	Melbourne	20 years, 201 days	6	3	0	Pick 11, 2025 national draft	
Billy Cootee	Sydney	23 years, 126 days	7	11	12	Pick 42, 2025 national draft	
Will Edwards	Sydney	23 years, 126 days	7	14	0	Category B rookie selection in 2022	
Lachlan Smith	Western Bulldogs	20 years, 200 days	7	2	0	Pick 47, 2023 national draft	
Sam Cumming	Richmond	18 years, 271 days	7	14	8	Pick 7, 2025 national draft	
Tom Burton	Richmond	18 years, 105 days	7	5	0	Pre-season supplemental selection in 2026	
Cody Curtin	Brisbane Lions	18 years, 347 days	8	4	2	Pick 43, 2025 national draft	
Bodie Ryan	Hawthorn	21 years, 18 days	9	5	0	Pick 46, 2023 national draft	
Tom Anastasopoulos	Port Adelaide	20 years, 349 days	10	5	2	Pick 48, 2023 national draft	
Jack Ison	Carlton	19 years, 51 days	10	8	3	Pick 47, 2025 national draft	
Charlie Banfield	St Kilda	18 years, 303 days	10	3	1	Pick 41, 2025 national draft	
Noah Roberts-Thomson	Richmond	19 years, 49 days	10	3	4	Pick 53, 2025 national draft	
Harrison Oliver	Greater Western Sydney	19 years, 336 days	10	5	1	Pick 19, 2024 national draft	
Cam Nairn	Hawthorn	18 years, 218 days	11	4	0	Pick 20, 2025 national draft	
Harry Kyle	Sydney	18 years, 318 days	12	12	1	Pick 14, 2025 national draft	
Hugo Hall-Kahan	Adelaide	22 years, 256 days	13	13	1	Pick 10, 2026 mid-season rookie draft; previously listed with Sydney	
Jai Murray	Gold Coast	19 years, 89 days	13	9	0	Pick 17, 2025 national draft	
Campbell Lake	St Kilda	21 years, 301 days	13	10	5	Pick 7, 2026 mid-season rookie draft	
Luker Kentfield	Melbourne	27 years, 155 days	13	3	1	Pick 11, 2024 mid-season rookie draft	
Mitch Podhajski	Collingwood	20 years, 272 days	13	2	1	Pick 18, 2026 mid-season rookie draft	
Luke Kennedy	Western Bulldogs	19 years, 243 days	14	8	2	Pick 62, 2024 national draft	
Lukas Cooke	Melbourne	22 years, 261 days	14	2	0	Pick 11, 2026 mid-season rookie draft	
Joel Fitzgerald	Melbourne	22 years, 209 days	14	11	2	Pick 16, 2026 mid-season rookie draft	
Taylor Goad	North Melbourne	23 years, 305 days	14	2	0	Pick 20, 2023 national draft	
Marcus Herbert	West Coast	23 years, 305 days	14	10	0	Pick 13, 2026 mid-season rookie draft	
Xavier Bamert	Port Adelaide	19 years, 135 days	14	10	6	Pick 5, 2026 mid-season rookie draft	
Kye Annand	Richmond	22 years, 243 days	14	11	0	Pick 2, 2026 mid-season rookie draft	
Beau Addinsall	Gold Coast	19 years, 102 days	15	9	2	Pick 18, 2025 national draft	
Sam Swadling	Collingwood	19 years, 155 days	15	9	6	Pick 37, 2025 national draft	
Oliver Francou	West Coast	20 years, 126 days	17	4	0	Pick 3, 2026 mid-season rookie draft	
Matt Hill	Hawthorn	22 years, 185 days	17	2	2	Category B rookie selection in 2024	
Riley Hamilton	Greater Western Sydney	19 years, 323 days	17	8	5	Category B rookie selection in 2025	
Jack Ough	Greater Western Sydney	19 years, 202 days	17	5	1	Pick 36, 2024 national draft	
Noah Mraz	Hawthorn	20 years, 134 days	17	4	1	Pick 35, 2024 national draft	
Dylan Patterson	Gold Coast	18 years, 306 days	17	5	3	Pick 5, 2025 national draft	
Liam Puncher	Collingwood	22 years, 310 days	17	8	0	Pick 15, 2026 mid-season rookie draft	
Ollie Greeves	Hawthorn	19 years, 154 days	18	4	1	Pick 12, 2026 rookie draft	
Flynn Riley	Carlton	22 years, 97 days	18	1	1	Pick 4, 2026 mid-season rookie draft	
Zane Peucker	Richmond	18 years, 221 days	18	2	1	Pick 31, 2025 national draft	
Jay Polkinghorne	Geelong	20 years, 44 days	19	8	14	Pick 44, 2024 national draft	
Balyn O'Brien	Port Adelaide	19 years, 173 days	19	6	0	Pre-season supplemental selection in 2026	
Jaxon Artemis	Essendon	19 years, 330 days	19	6	0	Pick 1, 2026 mid-season rookie draft	
Aidan Schubert	Hawthorn	18 years, 223 days	21	1	0	Pick 23, 2025 national draft	
Archie Ludowyke	Adelaide	18 years, 256 days	21	2	1	Pick 50, 2025 national draft	
Oscar Ryan	Adelaide	21 years, 79 days	21	2	1	Pick 27, 2023 national draft	
Will Green	Sydney	20 years, 334 days	22	3	0	Pick 16, 2023 national draft	
Alex van Wyk	Port Adelaide	22 years, 38 days	22	3	0	Pick 14, 2026 mid-season rookie draft	
Noah Howes	Collingwood	20 years, 285 days	22	2	0	Pick 15, 2025 mid-season rookie draft	
Max Beattie	Hawthorn	22 years, 270 days	23	4	3	Pick 12, 2026 mid-season rookie draft	
Lachlan Carmichael	Western Bulldogs	18 years, 354 days	23	2	0	Pick 21, 2025 national draft	
Tobyn Murray	Fremantle	21 years, 109 days	24	1	1	Pick 40, 2025 national draft	

== Change of AFL club ==
Name	Club	Age at debut	Debut round	Games (in 2026)	Goals (in 2026)	Former clubs	Recruiting method
Ben Ainsworth	Carlton	28 years, 23 days	Opening	25	30	Gold Coast	Traded in 2025
Campbell Chesser	Carlton	22 years, 312 days	Opening	3	0	West Coast	Traded in 2025
Charlie Curnow	Sydney	29 years, 31 days	Opening	24	75	Carlton	Traded in 2025
Will Hayward	Carlton	27 years, 130 days	Opening	21	24	Sydney	Traded in 2025
Ollie Florent	Carlton	27 years, 226 days	Opening	25	2	Sydney	Traded in 2025
Liam Reidy	Carlton	25 years, 264 days	Opening	4	0	Fremantle	Traded in 2025
Malcolm Rosas	Sydney	24 years, 252 days	Opening	16	16	Gold Coast	Traded in 2025
Jai Serong	Sydney	23 years, 18 days	Opening	24	7	Hawthorn	Traded in 2025
Christian Petracca	Gold Coast	30 years, 61 days	Opening	20	22	Melbourne	Traded in 2025
James Worpel	Geelong	27 years, 41 days	Opening	11	4	Hawthorn	Restricted free agency in 2025
Jayden Laverde	Greater Western Sydney	29 years, 329 days	Opening	19	0	Essendon	Pre-season supplemental selection in 2026
Clayton Oliver	Greater Western Sydney	28 years, 228 days	Opening	23	4	Melbourne	Traded in 2025
Oscar Allen	Brisbane Lions	26 years, 393 days	Opening	15	25	West Coast	Restricted free agency in 2025
Connor Budarick	Western Bulldogs	24 years, 335 days	Opening	16	1	Gold Coast	Traded in 2025
Jack Buller	Collingwood	24 years, 296 days	Opening	10	7	Sydney	Traded in 2025
Tom De Koning	St Kilda	26 years, 235 days	Opening	20	11	Carlton	Restricted free agency in 2025
Sam Flanders	St Kilda	24 years, 227 days	Opening	12	1	Gold Coast	Traded in 2025
Liam Ryan	St Kilda	29 years, 157 days	Opening	17	33	West Coast	Traded in 2025
Jack Silvagni	St Kilda	28 years, 81 days	Opening	23	5	Carlton	Unrestricted free agency in 2025
Brayden Fiorini	Essendon	28 years, 203 days	1	3	2	Gold Coast	Traded in 2025
Judd McVee	Fremantle	22 years, 219 days	1	24	1	Melbourne	Traded in 2025
Sam Draper	Brisbane Lions	27 years, 167 days	1	26	17	Essendon	Unrestricted free agency in 2025
Callum Ah Chee	Adelaide	28 years, 156 days	1	9	9	Gold Coast	Pick 1, 2026 pre-season draft
Callum Ah Chee	Adelaide	28 years, 156 days	1	9	9	Brisbane Lions	Pick 1, 2026 pre-season draft
Lachlan McAndrew	Adelaide	25 years, 292 days	1	24	7	Sydney	Pre-season supplemental selection in 2025
Corey Durdin	Port Adelaide	23 years, 335 days	1	23	32	Carlton	Traded in 2025
Jacob Wehr	Port Adelaide	27 years, 253 days	1	17	1	Greater Western Sydney	Unrestricted free agency in 2025
Changkuoth Jiath	Melbourne	26 years, 275 days	1	16	0	Hawthorn	Traded in 2025
Brody Mihocek	Melbourne	33 years, 39 days	1	10	16	Collingwood	Traded in 2025
Jack Steele	Melbourne	30 years, 92 days	1	24	4	Greater Western Sydney	Traded in 2025
Jack Steele	Melbourne	30 years, 92 days	1	24	4	St Kilda	Traded in 2025
Deven Robertson	West Coast	24 years, 258 days	1	4	0	Brisbane Lions	Pre-season supplemental selection in 2026
Tylar Young	West Coast	27 years, 191 days	1	23	0	Richmond	Traded in 2025
Finnbar Maley	Adelaide	22 years, 251 days	3	6	4	North Melbourne	Traded in 2025
Will Brodie	Port Adelaide	27 years, 218 days	3	2	0	Gold Coast	Traded in 2025
Will Brodie	Port Adelaide	27 years, 218 days	3	2	0	Fremantle	Traded in 2025
Harry Schoenberg	West Coast	25 years, 36 days	3	5	1	Adelaide	Pre-season supplemental selection in 2026
Flynn Perez	Hawthorn	24 years, 223 days	4	7	0	North Melbourne	Pre-season supplemental selection in 2026
Charlie Spargo	North Melbourne	26 years, 137 days	5	19	12	Melbourne	Unrestricted free agency in 2025
Max Heath	Melbourne	23 years, 177 days	6	7	2	St Kilda	Traded in 2025
Mason Cox	Fremantle	35 years, 36 days	6	20	7	Collingwood	Pre-season supplemental selection in 2026
Jamarra Ugle-Hagan	Gold Coast	24 years, 21 days	7	3	4	Western Bulldogs	Traded in 2025
Brandon Starcevich	West Coast	26 years, 318 days	13	11	1	Brisbane Lions	Traded in 2025

== See also ==
- List of AFL Women's debuts in 2026
