= Will White (Australian footballer) =

Australian rules footballer (born 2004)

Personal information
- Born: 18 March 2004 (age 22); Warrnambool
- Original team: South Warrnambool Football Club/GWV Rebels
- Draft: 2025 pre-season supplemental selection period
- Debut: Round 4, 2025, Carlton vs. Collingwood, at the Melbourne Cricket Ground
- Height: 179 cm (5 ft 10 in)
- Position: Forward

Club information
- Current club: Carlton
- Number: 38

Playing career^{1}
Years	Club	Games (Goals)
2025	Carlton	14 (10)
- ^{1} Playing statistics correct to the end of the 2025 season.

Will White (born 18 March 2004) is a former professional Australian Rules footballer who last played for the Carlton Football Club in the Australian Football League (AFL).

== Junior and VFL career ==
White played for the GWV Rebels in the Talent League. He averaged 12.1 disposals and 0.6 goals.

After going undrafted, White signed with Carlton's VFL team in 2023. He began showing impressive form during the 2024 VFL season, scoring 21 goals from 18 games.

== AFL career ==
After the conclusion of the 2024 AFL season, White was invited to train for one of two spots on Carlton's AFL list through the pre-season supplemental selection period. He initially failed to be selected, with the spots going to Matt Carroll and Francis Evans, but after multiple long-term injuries during pre-season practice matches, including one to Carlton's Jagga Smith, the AFL re-opened the pre-season supplemental selection period so that clubs could replace their injured players, and through this, White received a list spot.

White made his debut in round 4 of the 2025 season against Collingwood. He had 10 disposals and kicked 3 behinds in his first match. Two weeks later, in his third match, White produced his best performance of the season, kicking three goals against North Melbourne.

After playing fourteen games with Carlton in 2025, White was delisted at the end of the season. He was given the opportunity to train with Carlton over the summer to re-earn a list spot through the 2026 pre-season supplemental selection period. In February of 2026, White was informed that he would no longer be training with the club for a list spot, with Carlton instead electing to give a train-on opportunity to Wade Derksen. White was then invited to train with the Western Bulldogs following the retirement of James Harmes. White was not selected, with the Bulldogs instead picking Will Lewis.

== Statistics ==
Updated to the end of the 2025 season.

Legend
G	Goals	K	Kicks	D	Disposals	T	Tackles
B	Behinds	H	Handballs	M	Marks

Season	Team	No.	Games	Totals							Averages (per game)							Votes
Season	Team	No.	Games	G	B	K	H	D	M	T	G	B	K	H	D	M	T	Votes
2025	Carlton	38	14	10	11	81	39	120	31	27	0.7	0.8	5.8	2.8	8.6	2.2	1.9	0
Career			14	10	11	81	39	120	31	27	0.7	0.8	5.8	2.8	8.6	2.2	1.9	0
