= Lachlan Smith =

Australian rules footballer (born 2005)

Personal information
- Born: 5 October 2005 (age 21)
- Original team: Bunyip/Warragul
- Draft: No. 47, 2023 national draft
- Height: 203 cm (6 ft 8 in)
- Position: Ruckman

Playing career
Years	Club	Games (Goals)
2026	Western Bulldogs	2 (0)

Lachlan Smith (born 5 October 2005) is an Australian rules footballer who played for the Western Bulldogs in the Australian Football League (AFL).

Smith got his start in football playing for Bunyip, then didn't play at all from the ages of 11 to 16, instead prioritising basketball. During the COVID-19 pandemic, Smith was unable to play basketball as lockdown measures prevented indoor sport, so opted to return to football with the Warragul under-16s. He won a place with the Gippsland Power via Warragul, playing in their 2022 and 2023 Talent League campaigns, and featured for Vic Country in 2023.

A 203 cm left-footed ruckman, Smith was selected by the Western Bulldogs with pick 47 of the 2023 national draft. He appeared in Footscray's 2025 VFL premiership-winning team. In the 2026 AFL season, Smith made his debut against the Sydney Swans at home in round seven, rotating with Louis Emmett against Brodie Grundy. He had 13 hit-outs, 10 disposals, four clearances and five tackles, in a 66-point loss. After missing the next round, Smith was recalled for their win over Port Adelaide at Adelaide Oval. He was delisted at the end of the season.
