= Mani Liddy =

Personal information
- Full name: Mani Liddy
- Born: 20 February 2002 (age 24)
- Original team: Sturt/Central District
- Draft: No. 16, 2025 mid-season rookie draft
- Debut: Round 14, 2025, Port Adelaide vs. Melbourne, at Adelaide Oval
- Height: 184 cm (6 ft 0 in)
- Position: Midfielder

Playing career^{1}
Years	Club	Games (Goals)
2025–2026	Port Adelaide	9 (1)
- ^{1} Playing statistics correct to the end of the 2026 season.

Career highlights
- Fos Williams Medal: 2025

Mani Liddy (born 20 February 2002) is a former professional Australian rules footballer who plays for the Port Adelaide Football Club in the Australian Football League (AFL).

== Junior and SANFL career ==
Liddy, originally from the Kersbrook Football Club, started his career in the SANFL under 18s where he played for Sturt. He averaged 25.4 disposals a game at the level, but failed to be drafted. He went on to play 9 games in the Sturt senior team over two seasons (2021 - 5 games, 2022 - 4 games).

Liddy then switched SANFL clubs in 2023 to Central District, where he became a more regular player, playing 44 games over 3 seasons up until being drafted to the AFL in May 2025.

In July 2024, during a SANFL game against Norwood, Liddy contracted sepsis after getting a cut from falling onto the studs of an opposition player's football boots. Following this incident Liddy would wear a leg sleeve to protect his injured leg.

In May 2025, Liddy was selected to play for the SANFL state team and won the Fos Williams Medal as the best South Australian player against the WAFL state team.

During the 2025 season Liddy played for two SANFL clubs - Central Districts 9 games in which he averaged 22.4 disposals per game and Port Adelaide Reserves (SANFL) in 1 game vs Adelaide Reserves (SANFL) in Round 15 in which he collected 27 disposals.

== AFL career ==
Liddy was selected by Port Adelaide with pick 16 of the 2025 mid-season rookie draft. He made his debut in round 14 of the 2025 AFL season. He played nine AFL games in 2025, and at the end of the season signed a one-year contract extension to the end of 2026.

At the end of the 2026 AFL season, Liddy was delisted by Port Adelaide.

== Statistics ==
Updated to the end of the 2026 season.

Legend
G	Goals	K	Kicks	D	Disposals	T	Tackles
B	Behinds	H	Handballs	M	Marks

Season	Team	No.	Games	Totals							Averages (per game)							Votes
Season	Team	No.	Games	G	B	K	H	D	M	T	G	B	K	H	D	M	T	Votes
2025	Port Adelaide	50	9	1	2	80	47	127	37	20	0.1	0.2	8.9	5.2	14.1	4.1	2.2	0
2026	Port Adelaide	50	0	—	—	—	—	—	—	—	—	—	—	—	—	—	—	0
Career			9	1	2	80	47	127	37	20	0.1	0.2	8.9	5.2	14.1	4.1	2.2	0
