= Lachlan Blakiston =

Australian rules footballer (born 1998)

Personal information
- Born: 9 September 1998 (age 28)
- Original team: Cockburn/South Fremantle/East Fremantle
- Draft: No. 13, 2025 mid-season rookie draft
- Debut: Round 14, 2025, Essendon vs. Geelong, at the Melbourne Cricket Ground
- Height: 203 cm (6 ft 8 in)
- Weight: 100 kg (220 lb)
- Position: Ruck/Key Defender

Club information
- Current club: Essendon
- Number: 46

Playing career^{1}
Years	Club	Games (Goals)
2025–	Essendon	28 (3)
- ^{1} Playing statistics correct to the end of round 22, 2026.

Lachlan Blakiston (born 9 September 1998) is an Australian rules footballer who plays for the Essendon Football Club in the Australian Football League (AFL).

== WAFL career ==
Blakiston played for the Cockburn Cobras in the Perth Football League prior to being picked up by South Fremantle in the WAFL Reserves in 2022. He moved to East Fremantle's reserves team in 2023, and by 2024 he was playing in their top side, averaging 16 disposals and over 33 hitouts a game.

Blakiston received attention during the 2024 AFL draft period, but was ultimately not selected by any AFL clubs during that time.

== AFL career ==
Blakiston was selected by Essendon with pick 13 of the 2025 mid-season rookie draft. He made his debut against Geelong in round 14 of the 2025 AFL season. He played eleven games in 2025, playing as a key defender due to the large number of injuries at Essendon. In September of 2025, Blakiston signed a one-year contract extension to the end of 2026.

In March 2026, Blakiston extended his contract for a further two years to the end of 2028.

== Statistics ==
Updated to the end of round 22, 2026.

Legend
G	Goals	K	Kicks	D	Disposals	T	Tackles
B	Behinds	H	Handballs	M	Marks	H/O	Hit-outs

Season	Team	No.	Games	Totals								Averages (per game)								Votes
Season	Team	No.	Games	G	B	K	H	D	M	T	H/O	G	B	K	H	D	M	T	H/O	Votes
2025	Essendon	46	11	1	0	54	55	109	27	14	23	0.1	0.0	4.9	5.0	9.9	2.5	1.3	2.1	0
2026	Essendon	46	17	2	1	81	70	151	37	32	172	0.1	0.1	4.8	4.1	8.9	2.2	1.9	10.1	0
Career			28	3	1	135	125	260	64	46	195	0.1	0.0	4.8	4.5	9.3	2.3	1.6	7.0	0
