= Harrison Ramm =

Personal information
- Born: 5 December 2006 (age 19)
- Original team: Brighton/Glenelg
- Draft: No. 3, 2025 mid-season rookie draft
- Debut: Round 24, 2025, Port Adelaide vs. Gold Coast, at Adelaide Oval
- Height: 202 cm (6 ft 8 in)
- Position: Key Defender

Club information
- Current club: Port Adelaide
- Number: 32

Playing career^{1}
Years	Club	Games (Goals)
2025–	Port Adelaide	7 (0)
- ^{1} Playing statistics correct to the end of round 24, 2026.

Harrison Ramm (born 5 December 2006) is an Australian rules footballer who plays for the Port Adelaide Football Club in the Australian Football League (AFL).

== Early life ==
Ramm went to school at Sacred Heart College.

== Pre-AFL career ==
Ramm played SANFL under 18s for Glenelg. He was also part of South Australia's under 18s squad for the 2024 Under 18 Championships.

After going undrafted, he joined the senior Glenelg side, making his debut in round 2 of the 2025 SANFL season. There, with guidance from AFL-experienced players Oscar Adams, Liam McBean, and Lachlan Hosie, Ramm began to develop his game.

== AFL career ==
Ramm was selected by Port Adelaide with pick 3 of the 2025 mid-season rookie draft. He made his debut in round 24 of the 2025 AFL season.

After the conclusion of the 2025 AFL season, Ramm was promoted from Port Adelaide's rookie list to their primary list.

== Statistics ==
Updated to the end of round 22, 2026.

Legend
G	Goals	K	Kicks	D	Disposals	T	Tackles
B	Behinds	H	Handballs	M	Marks

Season	Team	No.	Games	Totals							Averages (per game)							Votes
Season	Team	No.	Games	G	B	K	H	D	M	T	G	B	K	H	D	M	T	Votes
2025	Port Adelaide	48	1	0	0	5	0	5	4	2	0.0	0.0	5.0	0.0	5.0	4.0	2.0	0
2026	Port Adelaide	32	4	0	0	10	7	17	6	6	0.0	0.0	2.5	1.8	4.3	1.5	1.5	0
Career			5	0	0	15	7	22	10	8	0.0	0.0	3.0	1.4	4.4	2.0	1.6	0
