= 2025 AFL draft =

Draft for the Australian Football League

General information
- Dates: 28 May 2025 – Mid-season Draft; 19–20 November 2025 – National Draft; 21 November 2025 – Rookie Draft
- Location: Marvel Stadium
- Network: Fox Footy
- Sponsored by: Telstra

Overview
- League: AFL
- First selection: Willem Duursma (West Coast)

The 2025 AFL draft consisted of the various periods where the 18 clubs in the Australian Football League (AFL) can trade and recruit players during and following the completion of the 2025 AFL season.

This national draft is notable for being the first-ever AFL National Draft where a club did not select a player; Port Adelaide passed on its only selection, trading its other selection to Gold Coast.

== Key dates ==
Table of key dates
Event	Date(s)
Mid-season rookie draft	28 May 2025
Free agency period	Restricted and Unrestricted: 3–10 October 2025; Delisted: October–November 2025
Trade period	6–15 October 2025
National draft	19–20 November 2025
Pre-Season and Rookie draft	21 November 2025
Pre-season supplemental selection period	December 2025 – March 2026

== 2025 mid-season rookie draft ==
The mid-season draft was held after the conclusion of round 11 of the 2025 AFL season on 28 May. The draft is only open to clubs with inactive players on their list and vacancies available, such as long-term injuries or retirements. As Gold Coast Suns and Essendon had played one fewer game than all other clubs, the draft order was determined using winning percentage.

Mid-season draft selections
Rd	Pick	Player	Club	Recruited from		Pick due to
Rd	Pick	Player	Club	Club	League	Pick due to
1	1	Tom McCarthy	West Coast	Richmond	VFL	Dom Sheed long-term injury
1	2	Zac Banch	North Melbourne	Werribee	VFL	Miller Bergman long-term injury
1	3	Harrison Ramm	Port Adelaide	Glenelg	SANFL	Xavier Walsh long-term injury
1	4	Flynn Young	Carlton	Werribee	VFL	Brodie Kemp long-term injury
1	5	Michael Sellwood	Western Bulldogs	Peel Thunder	WAFL	Passed selection at the 2024 Rookie Draft
1	6	Archer May	Essendon	Subiaco	WAFL	Sam Draper long-term injury
1	7	Oscar Adams	Gold Coast	Glenelg	SANFL	Charlie Ballard long-term injury
1	8	Roan Steele	Collingwood	West Perth	WAFL	Reef McInnes long-term injury
2	9	Jacob Newton	West Coast	Norwood	SANFL	Jake Waterman long-term injury
2	10	Cooper Trembath	North Melbourne	North Melbourne	VFL	Darcy Tucker long-term injury
2	11	Ewan Mackinlay	Port Adelaide	North Adelaide	SANFL	Todd Marshall long-term injury
2	12	Zac Walker	Western Bulldogs	Gippsland Power	Talent League	Cody Weightman long-term injury
2	13	Lachlan Blakiston	Essendon	East Fremantle	WAFL	Tom Edwards long-term injury
2	14	Caleb Lewis	Gold Coast	Casey Demons	VFL	Elliott Himmelberg long-term injury
2	15	Noah Howes	Collingwood	South Adelaide	SANFL	Harvey Harrison long-term injury
3	16	Mani Liddy	Port Adelaide	Central District	SANFL	Tom Cochrane long-term injury
3	17	Oskar Smartt	Essendon	Essendon	VFL	Nick Bryan long-term injury
4	18	Liam McMahon	Essendon	Carlton	VFL	Lewis Hayes long-term injury

== Player movements ==
=== Previous trades ===
Table of previously traded selections
Rd	Orig. Club	New Club	Acquired via	Ref
1	Carlton	Hawthorn	pick swap	
1	Melbourne	Essendon	pick swap	
1	Port Adelaide	Gold Coast	Houston, Lukosius, Richards, Atkins and Noble trade	
1	Collingwood	Gold Coast	Houston, Lukosius, Richards, Atkins and Noble trade	
1	Hawthorn	West Coast	Tom Barrass trade	
1	North Melbourne	Richmond	pick swap	
2	Brisbane Lions	Carlton	pick swap	
2	Carlton	Hawthorn	pick swap	
2	Adelaide	Greater Western Sydney	James Peatling trade	
2	Hawthorn	West Coast	Tom Barrass trade	
2	Richmond	North Melbourne	pick swap	
2	St Kilda	Essendon	pick swap	
3	Melbourne	Adelaide	pick swap	
3	Essendon	Brisbane Lions	via Melbourne (pick swap) on-traded to Brisbane Lions (Harry Sharp trade)	
3	Brisbane Lions	Melbourne	Harry Sharp trade	
3	Richmond	Fremantle	Shai Bolton trade	
3	Greater Western Sydney	Adelaide	James Peatling trade	
3	Hawthorn	West Coast	Tom Barrass trade	
3	West Coast	Brisbane Lions	pick swap	
3	Gold Coast	Brisbane Lions	pick swap	
3	Western Bulldogs	Brisbane Lions	pick swap	
4	Greater Western Sydney	Adelaide	James Peatling trade	
4	West Coast	Hawthorn	Tom Barrass trade	
4	Essendon	St Kilda	pick swap	
4	Richmond	Gold Coast	pick swap	
4	St Kilda	Brisbane Lions	pick swap	

=== Free agency ===
2025 AFL free agency period signings
Player	Free agent type	Recruited from	New club	Compensation	Notes	Ref
Jack Silvagni	Unrestricted	Carlton	St Kilda	End of first round	Swallowed up in a bid after being traded	
Tom De Koning	Restricted	Carlton	St Kilda	First round		
James Worpel	Restricted	Hawthorn	Geelong	End of second round		
Sam Draper	Unrestricted	Essendon	Brisbane Lions	End of first round	Swallowed up in a bid after being traded	
Jacob Wehr	Unrestricted	Greater Western Sydney	Port Adelaide	None		
Charlie Spargo	Unrestricted	Melbourne	North Melbourne	End of second round		
Oscar Allen	Restricted	West Coast	Brisbane Lions	First round		

=== Trades ===
Table of trades
Clubs involved	Trade		Ref
Carlton Fremantle	to Carlton (from Fremantle): Liam Reidy; pick No. 53; pick No. 71	to Fremantle (from Carlton): pick No. 50; pick No. 68	
Sydney Gold Coast	to Sydney (from Gold Coast): Malcolm Rosas Jr.; pick No. 62	to Gold Coast (from Sydney): pick No. 51; pick No. 69	
Brisbane Lions Fremantle West Coast	to Brisbane Lions: pick No. 16 (from West Coast); pick No. 22 (from West Coast); pick No. 44 (from Fremantle); pick No. 50 (from Fremantle); to Fremantle: pick No. 19 (from Brisbane Lions); pick No. 23 (from West Coast); pick No. 46 (from Brisbane Lions)	to West Coast: Brandon Starcevich (from Brisbane Lions); pick No. 12 (from Fremantle); pick No. 33 (from Fremantle); pick No. 52 (from Brisbane Lions)	
Fremantle Melbourne	to Fremantle (from Melbourne): Judd McVee	to Melbourne (from Fremantle): pick No. 23	
Gold Coast St Kilda	to St Kilda (from Gold Coast): Sam Flanders	to Gold Coast (from St Kilda): pick No. 7	
Melbourne St Kilda	to Melbourne (from St Kilda): Max Heath	to St Kilda (from Melbourne): 2027 fourth round pick (Melbourne)	
St Kilda West Coast	to St Kilda (from West Coast): Liam Ryan; 2027 third round pick (West Coast)	to West Coast (from St Kilda): 2026 second round pick (St Kilda)	
Melbourne Collingwood	to Melbourne (from Collingwood): Brody Mihocek; pick No. 71	to Collingwood (from Melbourne): pick No. 61; 2026 third round pick (Melbourne)	
Carlton West Coast	to Carlton (from West Coast): Campbell Chesser	to West Coast (from Carlton): pick No. 41	
Carlton Gold Coast Port Adelaide	to Carlton: Ben Ainsworth (from Gold Coast); pick No. 67 (from Port Adelaide); to Gold Coast: pick No. 29 (from Port Adelaide)	to Port Adelaide (from Carlton): Corey Durdin; 2026 second round pick (Carlton)	
Greater Western Sydney Western Bulldogs	to Greater Western Sydney (from Western Bulldogs): pick No. 12	to Western Bulldogs (from Greater Western Sydney): pick No. 14; pick No. 37	
Richmond West Coast	to West Coast (from Richmond): Tylar Young	to Richmond (from West Coast): pick No. 38	
Port Adelaide Fremantle	to Port Adelaide (from Fremantle): Will Brodie	to Fremantle (from Port Adelaide): pick No. 103	
Brisbane Lions Collingwood	to Brisbane Lions (from Collingwood): pick No. 59; 2026 third round pick (Melbourne)	to Collingwood (from Brisbane Lions): pick No. 45; pick No. 56	
Essendon Gold Coast	to Essendon (from Gold Coast): Brayden Fiorini	to Gold Coast (from Essendon): 2026 third round pick (Essendon)	
Western Bulldogs Gold Coast	to Western Bulldogs (from Gold Coast): Connor Budarick; pick No. 70	to Gold Coast (from Western Bulldogs): pick No. 37	
Carlton Sydney	to Carlton (from Sydney): Oliver Florent	to Sydney (from Carlton): 2026 third round pick (Carlton)	
Melbourne Hawthorn	to Melbourne (from Hawthorn): Changkuoth Jiath	to Hawthorn (from Melbourne): pick No. 42; 2026 fourth round pick (Melbourne)	
Sydney Hawthorn	to Sydney (from Hawthorn): Jai Serong; 2026 fourth round pick (Hawthorn)	to Hawthorn (from Sydney): 2026 third round pick (Sydney)	
Carlton Hawthorn	to Carlton (from Hawthorn): pick No. 9; pick No. 31; pick No. 42; pick No. 43	to Hawthorn (from Carlton): pick No. 10; pick No. 22	
Adelaide North Melbourne	to Adelaide (from North Melbourne): Finnbar Maley; pick No. 64	to North Melbourne (from Adelaide): pick No. 57; 2026 fourth round pick (Adelaide)	
Gold Coast Western Bulldogs	to Gold Coast (from Western Bulldogs): Jamarra Ugle-Hagan	to Western Bulldogs (from Gold Coast): pick No. 74	
Collingwood Sydney	to Collingwood (from Sydney): Jack Buller; 2026 fourth round pick (Sydney)	to Sydney (from Collingwood): 2026 third round pick (Collingwood)	
Richmond Geelong	to Richmond (from Geelong): Patrick Retschko ^{[a]}	to Geelong (from Richmond): pick No. 99	
Gold Coast Melbourne	to Gold Coast (from Melbourne): Christian Petracca; pick No. 24; pick No. 28; 2026 second round pick (Melbourne)	to Melbourne (from Gold Coast): pick No. 7; pick No. 8; pick No. 37; 2026 first round pick (Gold Coast); 2027 third round pick (Gold Coast)	
Melbourne St Kilda	to Melbourne (from St Kilda): Jack Steele	to St Kilda (from Melbourne): 2027 third round pick (Melbourne)	
Greater Western Sydney Melbourne	to Greater Western Sydney (from Melbourne): Clayton Oliver	to Melbourne (from Greater Western Sydney): 2026 third round pick (Greater Western Sydney)	
Sydney Carlton	to Sydney (from Carlton): Charlie Curnow; pick No. 31; pick No. 42; 2027 second round pick (Carlton)	to Carlton (from Sydney): Will Hayward; pick No. 11; 2026 first round pick (Sydney); 2027 first round pick (Sydney)	
Western Bulldogs West Coast	to Western Bulldogs from West Coast: pick No. 53	to West Coast (from Western Bulldogs): 2026 fourth round pick (Western Bulldogs)	
Picks swapped at the 2025 National Draft
Essendon; Carlton	Essendon Trade Picks 21, 27, 30 to Carlton for Picks 9 and 43		
Carlton; North Melbourne	Carlton Trade Picks 11, 54 to North Melbourne for Picks 25, 46, and 2026 second round pick (North Melbourne)		
Brisbane Lions; Hawthorn	Brisbane Lions Trade Pick 17 to Hawthorn for pick 22 and a 2026 third round pick (Hawthorn)		
Gold Coast; Greater Western Sydney	Gold Coast Trade Pick 35 to Greater Western Sydney for a 2026 second round pick (Melbourne)		
Adelaide; Gold Coast	Adelaide Trade Pick 48 to Gold Coast for a 2026 third round pick (Essendon)		
Port Adelaide; Gold Coast	Port Adelaide Trade Pick 49 to Gold Coast for a 2026 third round pick (Gold Coast)		
Gold Coast; Western Bulldogs	Gold Coast Trade Picks 15, 29 to Western Bulldogs for picks 14, 33 and 53		
Hawthorn; Greater Western Sydney	Hawthorn Trade Pick 14 to Greater Western Sydney for pick 16 and a 2026 second round pick (Greater Western Sydney)		
Hawthorn; West Coast	Hawthorn Trade Pick 17 to West Coast for pick 18 and a 2026 second round pick (St Kilda)		
Carlton; Gold Coast	Carlton Trade Pick 28 to Gold Coast for a 2026 second round pick (Gold Coast)		
West Coast; Hawthorn	West Coast Trade Pick 34 to Hawthorn for a 2026 third round pick (Hawthorn) and a 2027 third round pick (Hawthorn)		
Carlton; Brisbane Lions	Carlton Trade Pick 38 to Brisbane Lions for a 2026 third round pick (Brisbane Lions)		
Collingwood; Greater Western Sydney	Collingwood Trade Pick 51 to Greater Western Sydney for a 2026 fourth round pick (Greater Western Sydney)		
Gold Coast; Richmond	Gold Coast Trade Pick 52 to Richmond for a 2026 fifth round pick (Richmond)		

== List changes ==
=== Retirements ===
Table key
R	Rookie listed player
B	Category B Rookie listed player

Table of player retirements
Name	Club	Notes	Ref
Brad Crouch R	St Kilda	Retired in November 2024 after being redrafted.	
Jeremy McGovern	West Coast		
Dom Sheed	West Coast		
Michael Walters	Fremantle		
Sam Docherty	Carlton		
Rory Atkins	Port Adelaide		
Callan Ward	Greater Western Sydney		
Travis Boak	Port Adelaide		
Nat Fyfe	Fremantle		
Luke Breust	Hawthorn		
Quinton Narkle	Fremantle		
Taylor Duryea	Western Bulldogs		
Will Hoskin-Elliott	Collingwood		
Jimmy Webster	St Kilda		
Willie Rioli	Port Adelaide		
Jayden Hunt	West Coast		
Matt Crouch	Adelaide		
Mitch Duncan	Geelong		
David Swallow	Gold Coast		
Sean Lemmens	Gold Coast		
Lachlan Keeffe	Greater Western Sydney		
James Aish	Fremantle		
Brodie Smith	Adelaide		
Sam Day	Brisbane Lions		
Oscar McInerney	Brisbane Lions		
Todd Goldstein	Essendon	Delisted on 21 September 2025. Later retired on 20 November 2025.	
Dylan Shiel	Essendon	Delisted on 28 August 2025. Later retired on 29 November 2025.	
Sam Frost	Hawthorn	Delisted on 24 September 2025. Later retired on 13 December 2025.	
Zak Jones	St Kilda	Delisted on 16 October 2025. Later retired on 13 December 2025.	
Tom Mitchell	Collingwood	Delisted on 18 October 2025. Later retired on 28 January 2026.	

=== Delistings ===
Table of player delistings
Name	Club	Notes	Ref
Kamdyn McIntosh	Richmond		
Zaine Cordy	St Kilda		
Ryan Burton	Port Adelaide		
Jeremy Finlayson	Port Adelaide		
Dylan Williams	Port Adelaide		
Lachie Charleson	Port Adelaide		
Hugh Jackson	Port Adelaide		
Jed McEntee	Port Adelaide		
Jack Petruccelle	West Coast		
Callum Jamieson	West Coast		
Loch Rawlinson	West Coast		
Eddie Ford	North Melbourne		
Brynn Teakle	North Melbourne		
Kallan Dawson	North Melbourne		
Miller Bergman	North Melbourne		
Angus McLennan	St Kilda		
Harry Boyd	St Kilda		
Jacob Bauer	Richmond		
Mate Colina	Richmond		
Orazio Fantasia	Carlton		
Harry Lemmey	Carlton		
Alex Cincotta	Carlton		
Robbie Fox	Sydney		
Indhi Kirk	Sydney		
Caleb Mitchell	Sydney		
Ben Paton	Sydney		
Dylan Shiel	Essendon	Delisted on 28 August 2025. Later retired on 29 November 2025.	
Jye Menzie	Essendon		
Alwyn Davey Jr.	Essendon		
Jacob Koschitzke	Richmond		
Jacob Blight	Richmond		
Aaron Francis	Sydney		
Blake Leidler	Sydney		
Josh Fahey	Greater Western Sydney		
Jack Billings	Melbourne		
Kynan Brown	Melbourne		
Tom Fullarton	Melbourne		
Marty Hore	Melbourne		
Oliver Sestan	Melbourne		
Will Verrall	Melbourne		
Jack Delean	Fremantle		
Odin Jones	Fremantle		
Lachlan Murphy	Adelaide		
Karl Gallagher	Adelaide		
Kieran Strachan	Adelaide		
Harry Schoenberg	Adelaide		
Alex Sexton	Gold Coast		
Tom Berry	Gold Coast		
Lloyd Johnston	Gold Coast		
Jayden Laverde	Essendon		
Todd Goldstein	Essendon	Delisted on 21 September 2025. Later retired on 20 November 2025.	
Oskar Smartt	Essendon		
Oleg Markov	Collingwood		
Ash Johnson	Collingwood		
Finlay Macrae	Collingwood		
Charlie Dean	Collingwood		
Liam Jones	Western Bulldogs		
Anthony Scott	Western Bulldogs		
Sam Frost	Hawthorn	Delisted on 24 September 2025. Later retired on 13 December 2025.	
Jasper Scaife	Hawthorn		
Patrick Retschko ^{[a]}	Geelong	Traded to Richmond post delisting.	
Xavier Ivisic	Geelong		
Brandon Ryan	Brisbane Lions		
Darcy Craven	Brisbane Lions		
Arie Schoenmaker	St Kilda		
Zak Jones	St Kilda	Delisted on 16 October 2025. Later retired on 13 December 2025.	
Taj Woewodin	Melbourne		
Deven Robertson	Brisbane Lions		
Chris Burgess	Adelaide		
Mason Cox	Collingwood		
Tom Mitchell	Collingwood	Delisted on 18 October 2025. Later retired on 28 January 2026.	
Wade Derksen	Greater Western Sydney		
Cameron Guthrie	Geelong		
Ben Hobbs	Essendon		
Luamon Lual	Essendon		
Jason Johannisen	Western Bulldogs		
Seamus Mitchell	Hawthorn		
Caleb Poulter	Western Bulldogs		
Ted Clohesy	Geelong		
Keighton Matofai-Forbes	Geelong	Club committed to redrafting in the Rookie Draft	
George Stevens	Geelong	Club committed to redrafting in the Rookie Draft	
Will Phillips	North Melbourne		
Darcy Tucker	North Melbourne		
Geordie Payne	North Melbourne		
Jaxon Binns	Carlton		
Elijah Hollands	Carlton		
Will White	Carlton		
Lincoln McCarthy	Brisbane Lions	Club committed to redrafting in the Rookie Draft	
Jake Lloyd	Sydney	Club committed to redrafting in the Rookie Draft	
Dane Rampe	Sydney	Club committed to redrafting in the Rookie Draft	
Tyler Welsh	Adelaide	Club committed to redrafting in the Rookie Draft	
Ben Jepson	Gold Coast	Club committed to redrafting in the Rookie Draft	
Thomson Dow	Richmond		
Will Setterfield	Essendon		
Conor Stone	Greater Western Sydney	Club committed to redrafting in the Rookie Draft	
Jake Stringer	Greater Western Sydney	Club committed to redrafting in the National Draft	
Coen Livingstone	West Coast		
Callum Ah Chee	Brisbane Lions	Self-delisted. Drafted by Adelaide in 2026 pre-season draft.	^{[b]}
Ryan Byrnes	St Kilda	Club committed to redrafting in the National Draft	^{[b]}
Patrick Said	St Kilda	Club committed to redrafting in the Rookie Draft	^{[b]}

== West Coast concessions ==
Due to the club's poor on-field results since 2022, the AFL announced draft concessions for West Coast which included:

- One end-of-first round selection in the 2025 AFL Draft (placed after end-of-first round compensation picks for free agency moves)
- Four extra Category A Rookie list spots.

== 2025 national draft ==
=== Table of national draft selections ===
Round	Pick	Player	Club	Recruited from		Notes
Round	Pick	Player	Club	Club	League	Notes
1	1	Willem Duursma	West Coast	Gippsland Power	Talent League	
1	2	Zeke Uwland	Gold Coast	Burleigh	QAFL	Academy selection, matched bid by West Coast
1	3	Harry Dean	Carlton	Murray Bushrangers	Talent League	Father–son selection (son of Peter Dean), matched bid by West Coast
1	4	Cooper Duff-Tytler	West Coast	Calder Cannons	Talent League	Free agency compensation pick (Allen)
1	5	Dylan Patterson	Gold Coast	Palm Beach-Currumbin	QAFL	Academy selection, matched bid by Richmond
1	6	Daniel Annable	Brisbane Lions	Redland-Victoria Point	QAFL	Academy selection, matched bid by Richmond
1	7	Sam Cumming	Richmond	North Adelaide	SANFL	
1	8	Sam Grlj	Richmond	Oakleigh Chargers	Talent League	←North Melbourne (2024)
1	9	Sullivan Robey	Essendon	Eastern Ranges	Talent League	
1	10	Jacob Farrow	Essendon	West Perth	WAFL	←Melbourne (2024)
1	11	Xavier Taylor	Melbourne	Eastern Ranges	Talent League	←Gold Coast←Port Adelaide (2024)
1	12	Latrelle Pickett	Melbourne	Glenelg	SANFL	←Gold Coast←St Kilda
1	13	Dyson Sharp	Essendon	Central District	SANFL	←Carlton (draft)←Hawthorn←Carlton (2024)
1	14	Harry Kyle	Sydney	UNSW-Eastern Suburbs	Sydney AFL	Academy selection, matched bid by Greater Western Sydney
1	15	Oskar Taylor	Greater Western Sydney	Eastern Ranges	Talent League	←Hawthorn (draft)←Carlton Free agency compensation pick (de Koning)
1	16	Lachy Dovaston	North Melbourne	Eastern Ranges	Talent League	←Carlton (draft)←Sydney
1	17	Jai Murray	Gold Coast	Burleigh	QAFL	Academy selection, matched bid by West Coast
1	18	Beau Addinsall	Gold Coast	Burleigh	QAFL	Academy selection, matched bid by West Coast
1	19	Josh Lindsay	West Coast	Geelong Falcons	Talent League	←Hawthorn (draft)←Greater Western Sydney (draft)←Western Bulldogs
1	20	Cameron Nairn	Hawthorn	Central District	SANFL	←West Coast (draft)←Fremantle
1	21	Lachlan Carmichael	Western Bulldogs	North Shore Bombers	Sydney AFL	←Greater Western Sydney; Academy eligible for Sydney, but they did not match Western Bulldogs bid
1	22	Mitch Marsh	Adelaide	West Adelaide	SANFL	
1	23	Aidan Schubert	Hawthorn	Central District	SANFL	←Brisbane Lions (draft)←West Coast←Hawthorn (2024)
1	24	Harley Barker	Geelong	Sturt	SANFL	
1	25	Adam Sweid	Fremantle	Calder Cannons	Talent League	←Brisbane Lions; Academy eligible for Essendon, but they did not match Fremantle bid
2	26	Blake Thredgold	North Melbourne	Sturt	SANFL	
2	27	Louis Emmett	Western Bulldogs	Oakleigh Chargers	Talent League	←Hawthorn (draft)←Carlton Free agency compensation pick (Silvagni)
2	28	Avery Thomas	Gold Coast	Tasmania Devils	Talent League	←North Melbourne (draft)←Richmond (2024)
2	29	Sam Allen	West Coast	Oakleigh Chargers	Talent League	←North Melbourne (draft)
2	30	Thomas Matthews	Melbourne	Gippsland Power	Talent League	
2	31	Zane Peucker	Richmond	Woodville-West Torrens	SANFL	
2	32	Tyan Prindable	Collingwood	Coorparoo	QAFL	Academy eligible for Brisbane Lions, but they did not match Collingwood bid
2	33	Hunter Holmes	Geelong	Oakleigh Chargers	Talent League	
2	34	Jack Dalton	Hawthorn	Sandringham Dragons	Talent League	←West Coast (draft)
2	35	Jevan Phillipou	Sydney	Woodville-West Torrens	SANFL	←Carlton ←Hawthorn ←Melbourne Free agency compensation pick (Spargo)
2	36	Max Kondogiannis	Essendon	Oakleigh Chargers	Talent League	←Carlton (draft) ←Hawthorn (draft) Free agency compensation pick (Worpel)
3	37	Sam Swadling	Collingwood	West Perth	WAFL	
3	38	Koby Evans	Brisbane Lions	Perth	WAFL	←Carlton (draft); Next Generation Academy eligible for West Coast, but they did not match Brisbane Lions bid
3	39	Tylah Williams	West Coast	Swan Districts	WAFL	Next Generation Academy selection, matched bid by Fremantle
3	40	Tobyn Murray	Fremantle	Geelong	VFL	
3	41	Charlie Banfield	St Kilda	Claremont	WAFL	Father-Son eligible for West Coast (son of Drew Banfield), but they did not match St Kilda bid
3	42	Billy Cootee	Sydney	Norwood	SANFL	
3	43	Cody Curtin	Brisbane Lions	Claremont	WAFL	
3	44	Tai Hayes	Brisbane Lions	Southport	VFL	
3	45	Talor Byrne	Carlton	Greater Western Victoria Rebels	Talent League	
3	46	Koby Coulson	Gold Coast	Broadbeach	QAFL	Academy selection, matched bid by North Melbourne
3	47	Jack Ison	Carlton	Oakleigh Chargers	Talent League	Next Generation Academy selection, matched bid by North Melbourne
3	48	Hugo Mikunda	North Melbourne	Geelong Falcons	Talent League	
3	49	Max King	Sydney	Cardiff Hawks	AFL Hunter Central Coast	Academy selection, matched bid by Adelaide
3	50	Archie Ludowyke	Adelaide	Sandringham Dragons	Talent League	
3	51	Finnegan Davis	Greater Western Sydney	Western Jets	Talent League	←Collingwood (draft)
3	52	Kye Fincher	St Kilda	Sandringham Dragons	Talent League	Next Generation Academy selection, matched bid by Richmond
3	53	Hussien El Achkar	Essendon	Calder Cannons	Talent League	Next Generation Academy selection, matched bid by Richmond
3	54	Noah Roberts-Thomson	Richmond	Sturt	SANFL	
3	55	Zac McCarthy	Collingwood	Oakleigh Chargers	Talent League	Next Generation Academy selection
4	56	Matthew LeRay	Hawthorn	Central District	SANFL	
4	57	Angus Anderson	Collingwood	Sturt	SANFL	
5	58	Ryan Byrnes	St Kilda	St Kilda	AFL	Redrafted player
5	59	Jake Stringer	Greater Western Sydney	Greater Western Sydney	AFL	Redrafted player
6	60	Will Darcy	Western Bulldogs	Oakleigh Chargers	Talent League	Father–son selection (son of Luke Darcy)

=== Rookie elevations ===
Reference List:

Table of rookie elevations
Player	Club
Conor McKenna	Brisbane Lions
Ryan Lester	Brisbane Lions
Hudson O'Keeffe	Carlton
Jaxon Prior	Essendon
Vigo Visentini	Essendon
Josh Draper	Fremantle
Jeremy Sharp	Fremantle
Oisín Mullin	Geelong
Sam Clohesy	Gold Coast
James Blanck	Hawthorn
Tom Cochrane	Port Adelaide
Josh Lai	Port Adelaide
Harrison Ramm	Port Adelaide
Logan Evans	Port Adelaide
Seth Campbell	Richmond
Anthony Caminiti	St Kilda
Tyrell Dewar	West Coast
James O'Donnell	Western Bulldogs
Oskar Baker	Western Bulldogs

== 2026 pre-season draft ==
Round	Pick	Player	Club	Recruited from		Ref
Round	Pick	Player	Club	Club	League	Ref
1	1	Callum Ah Chee	Adelaide	Brisbane Lions	AFL	

== 2026 rookie draft ==
Rookie draft selections
Round	Pick	Player	Club	Recruited from		Notes
Round	Pick	Player	Club	Club	League	Notes
1	1	Fred Rodriguez	West Coast	South Fremantle	WAFL	
1	2	Passed	Richmond	—	—	
1	3	Riley Onley	Melbourne	Murray Bushrangers	Talent League	
1	4	Jack Watkins	Port Adelaide	Port Adelaide	SANFL	
1	5	Patrick Said	St Kilda	St Kilda	AFL	Redrafted player
1	6	Passed	Carlton	—	—	
1	7	Jake Lloyd	Sydney	Sydney	AFL	Redrafted player
1	8	Leon Kickett	Fremantle	Swan Districts	WAFL	
1	9	Conor Stone	Greater Western Sydney	Greater Western Sydney	AFL	Redrafted player
1	10	Ben Jepson	Gold Coast	Gold Coast	AFL	Redrafted player
1	11	Tyler Welsh	Adelaide	Adelaide	AFL	Redrafted player
1	12	Oliver Greeves	Hawthorn	Eastern Ranges	Talent League	
1	13	George Stevens	Geelong	Geelong	AFL	Redrafted player
1	14	Lincoln McCarthy	Brisbane Lions	Brisbane Lions	AFL	Redrafted player
2	15	Passed	West Coast	—	—	
2	16	Passed	Port Adelaide	—	—	
2	17	Passed	St Kilda	—	—	
2	18	Dane Rampe	Sydney	Sydney	AFL	Redrafted player
2	19	Passed	Fremantle	—	—	
2	20	Passed	Greater Western Sydney	—	—	
2	21	Passed	Adelaide	—	—	
2	22	Passed	Hawthorn	—	—	
2	23	Keighton Matofai-Forbes	Geelong	Geelong	AFL	Redrafted player
3	24	Passed	West Coast	—	—	
3	25	Passed	Port Adelaide	—	—	
3	26	Passed	Fremantle	—	—	
3	27	Passed	Hawthorn	—	—	
3	28	Nick Driscoll	Geelong	Northern Knights	Talent League	
4	29	Passed	West Coast	—	—	

=== Pre-listed Category A rookies ===
Pre-listed category A rookies
Name	Club	Recruited from		Date Signed	Notes
Name	Club	Club	League	Date Signed	Notes
Jai Saxena	Collingwood	Oakleigh Chargers	Talent League	20 November 2025	Next Generation Academy selection (Indian descent)
Kalani White	Melbourne	Casey	VFL	20 November 2025	Father-son selection (son of Jeff White)

=== Category B rookie selections ===
Table of Category B rookie selections
Name	Club	Origin	Note	Date Signed	Ref
Indy Cotton	Adelaide	BA Centre of Excellence (NBL1 East)	Three-year non-registered player (basketball)	29 August 2025	
Ben Murphy	Brisbane Lions	Kerry GAA	International selection (Ireland)	3 November 2025	
Cillian Bourke	Essendon	Offaly GAA	International selection (Ireland)	5 March 2026	
Toby Whan	Fremantle	South Fremantle	Next Generation Academy selection (South African descent)	21 November 2025	
Ryda Luke	Fremantle	South Fremantle	Next Generation Academy selection (Indigenous)	21 November 2025	
Jesse Mellor	Geelong	Geelong Falcons (Talent League)	Academy selection	21 November 2025	
Riley Hamilton	Greater Western Sydney	Ainslie (AFL Canberra)	Academy selection	21 November 2025	
Oscar Berry	Melbourne	North Florida Ospreys (NCAA)	Three-year non-registered player (basketball)	24 August 2025	
Lachy Brewer	North Melbourne	Idaho State Bengals (NCAA)	Three-year non-registered player (basketball)	18 March 2026	
Kobe McDonald	St Kilda	Mayo GAA	International selection (Ireland); Officially joined club in July 2026	3 November 2025; 27 July 2026 (Joined Club)	
Noah Chamberlain	Sydney	St Ives Saints (AFL Sydney)	Academy selection	19 November 2025	
Liam Hetherton	Sydney	Murray Bushrangers (Talent League)	Formerly with Greater Western Sydney's academy	20 November 2025	
Jake Miles-Wrency	West Coast	Southwestern Illinois College (NJCAA)	Three-year non-registered player (basketball)	10 March 2026	

=== Pre-season supplemental selection period ===
Player	Club	Recruited from		Notes	Ref
Player	Club	Club	League	Notes	Ref
Wade Derksen	Carlton	Greater Western Sydney	AFL		
Elijah Hollands	Carlton	Carlton	AFL	Re-signed player	
Will Setterfield	Essendon	Essendon	AFL	Re-signed player	
Mason Cox	Fremantle	Collingwood	AFL		
Chris Scerri	Fremantle	Northern Bullants	VFL		
Jayden Laverde	Greater Western Sydney	Essendon	AFL		
Flynn Perez	Hawthorn	Sturt	SANFL		
Paddy Cross	Melbourne	Casey	VFL		
Tom Blamires	North Melbourne	Frankston	VFL		
Balyn O'Brien	Port Adelaide	Norwood	SANFL		
Mitch Zadow	Port Adelaide	East Fremantle	WAFL		
Tom Burton	Richmond	Western Jets	Talent League		
Finlay Macrae	West Coast	Collingwood	AFL		
Milan Murdock	West Coast	East Fremantle	WAFL		
Deven Robertson	West Coast	Brisbane Lions	AFL		
Harry Schoenberg	West Coast	Adelaide	AFL		
Will Lewis	Western Bulldogs	Footscray	VFL		

== Footnotes ==
- a^{1} ^{2} Patrick Retschko was originally delisted by Geelong on October 2. However he was still traded to Richmond as the list lodgement date had not come yet so his contract had not officially expired.
- b^{1} The article cited here has the information at the bottom of the article in the separate club sections for Adelaide, Brisbane Lions and St Kilda

== See also ==
- 2025 AFL Women's draft
