= Oskar Smartt =

Australian rules footballer (born 2005)

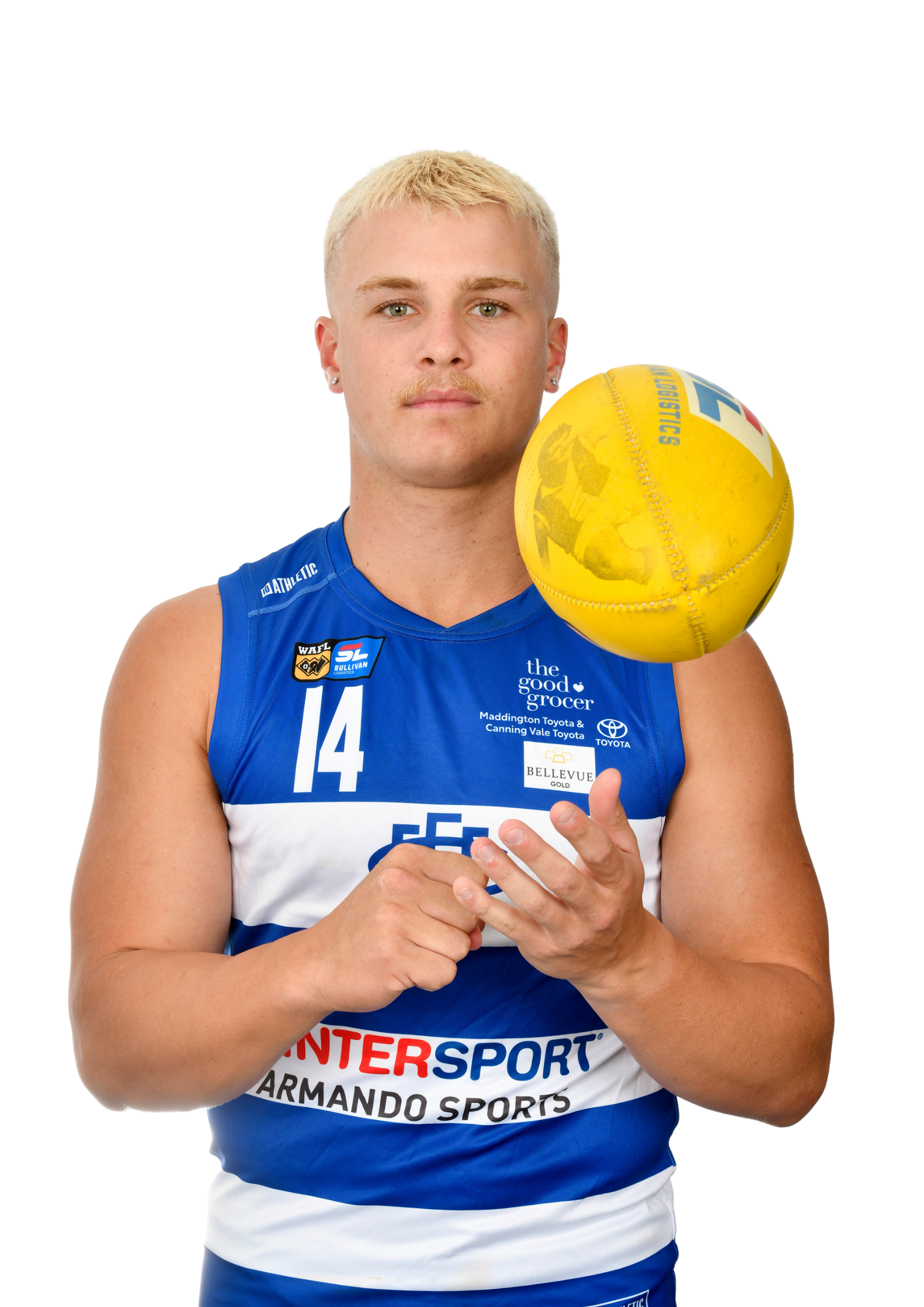

Personal information
- Full name: Oskar Smartt
- Born: 26 October 2005 (age 21)
- Original team: Bendigo Pioneers (Talent League)
- Draft: No. 17, 2025 mid-season rookie draft
- Debut: Round 18, 2025, Essendon vs. Richmond, at Melbourne Cricket Ground
- Height: 182 cm (5 ft 11 in)

Club information
- Current club: East Fremantle Football Club
- Number: 14

Playing career^{1}
Years	Club	Games (Goals)
2025	Essendon	4 (0)
- ^{1} Playing statistics correct to the end of the 2025 season.

Oskar Smartt (born 26 October 2005) is a former professional Australian rules footballer who played for the Essendon Football Club in the Australian Football League (AFL). He is currently playing for East Fremantle Football Club in the West Australian Football League (WAFL).

== AFL career ==
Having played his junior football for Leitchville-Gunbower in the Heathcote District Football League, Smartt played his Under-18 season with his local Talent League club, the Bendigo Pioneers. However, he did not get drafted by any AFL clubs in his first draft-eligible year.

Smartt joined Essendon's reserves team for the 2024 VFL season, while playing his local footy for the Keilor Football Club in the Essendon District Football League (EDFL) when he wasn't selected for the VFL team. He played 12 VFL matches for Essendon in 2024, and re-signed with the club for the 2025 VFL season, while moving to the Colac Football Club in the Geelong Football League.

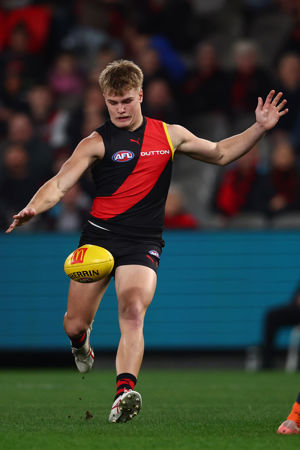
Oskar Smartt playing for Essendon in 2025

=== Essendon ===
Having impressed the club's recruitment team with his performances in the VFL, Smartt was drafted by Essendon in the 2025 mid-season rookie draft. Smartt continued to play in the VFL for Essendon until he was called up to make his senior debut in the AFL in round 18 against Richmond at the Melbourne Cricket Ground. From his debut, Smartt played four consecutive senior matches, before losing his place in the team and being delisted at the end of the season. Following his delisting, Smart signed with WAFL club East Fremantle.

=== East Fremantle ===
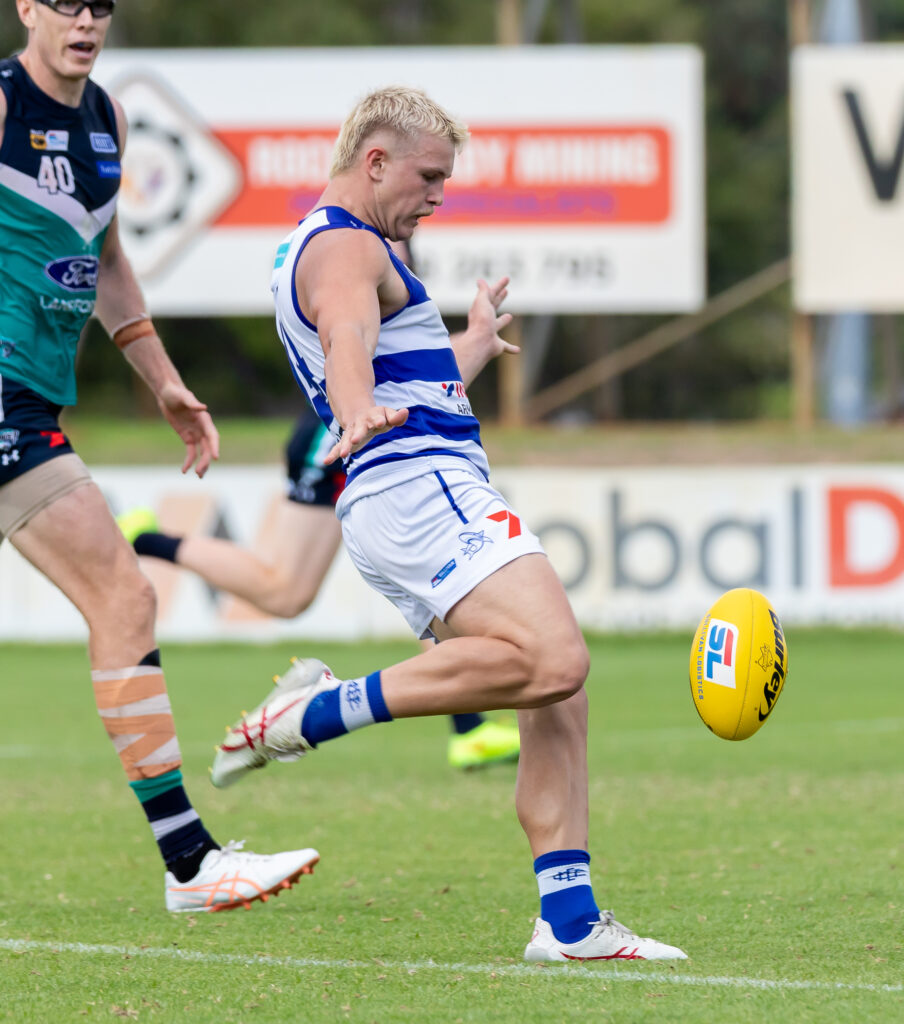
Oskar Smartt playing for East Fremantle in 2026

In October 2025, Smartt signed a 2 year deal with East Fremantle Football Club. After signing with the club, Smartt had an instant impact to the WAFL side. Smartt has kicked 18 goals in 8 matches so far this season.

Smartt's player overview, biography, season statistics & career statistics can be found here: https://www.wafl.com.au/player/oskar-smartt

== Statistics ==
Updated to the end of the 2025 season.

Legend
G	Goals	K	Kicks	D	Disposals	T	Tackles
B	Behinds	H	Handballs	M	Marks

Season	Team	No.	Games	Totals							Averages (per game)							Votes
Season	Team	No.	Games	G	B	K	H	D	M	T	G	B	K	H	D	M	T	Votes
2025	Essendon	47	4	0	5	17	5	22	7	8	0.0	1.3	4.3	1.3	5.5	1.8	2.0	0
Career			4	0	5	17	5	22	7	8	0.0	1.3	4.3	1.3	5.5	1.8	2.0	0
