= Ewan Mackinlay =

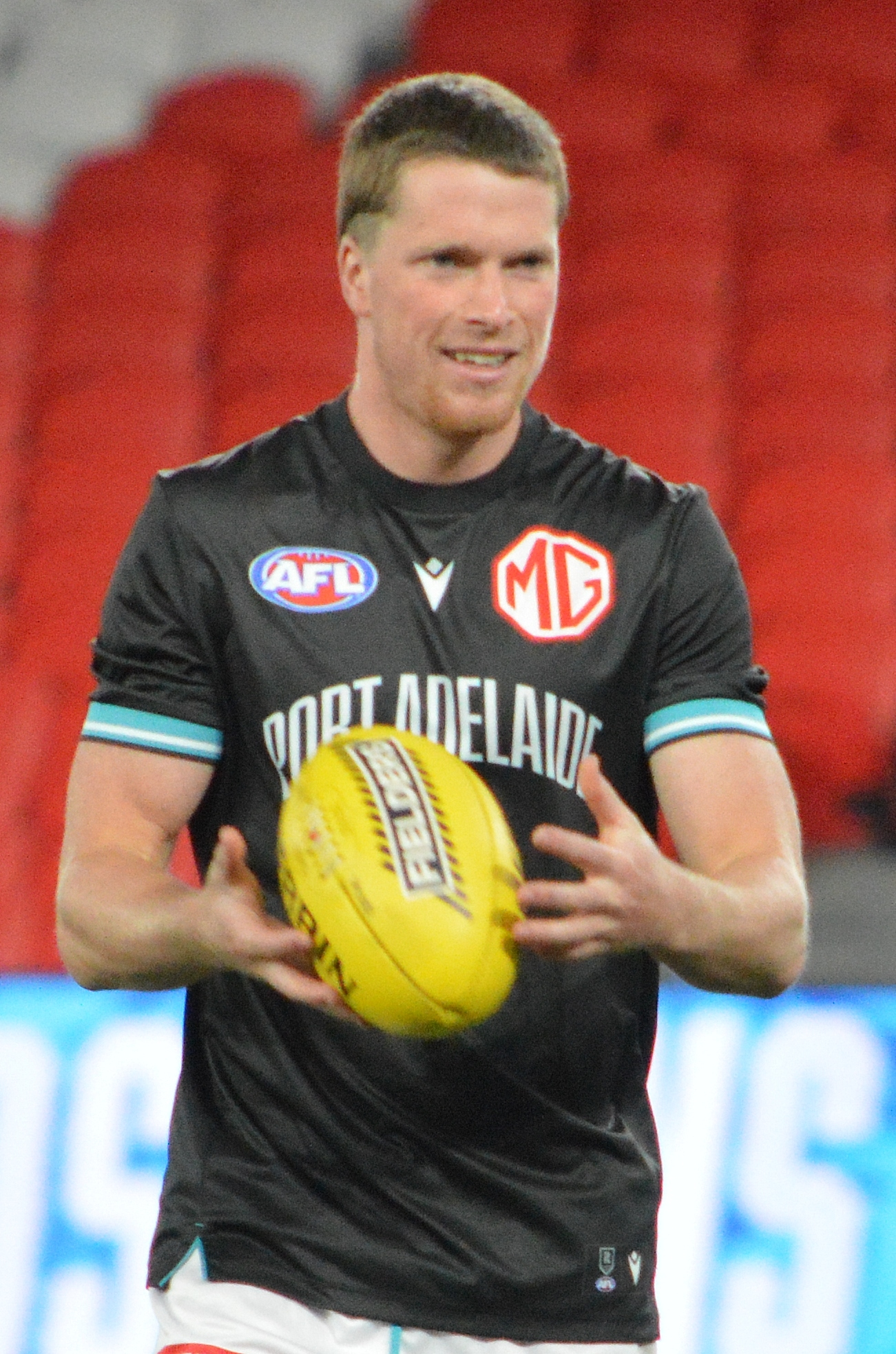
- Mackinlay in March 2026

Personal information
- Born: 18 July 2003 (age 23)
- Original teams: Murray Bushrangers (Talent League); Essendon (VFL); Lavington (Ovens & Murray); North Adelaide (SANFL)
- Draft: No. 11, 2025 mid-season rookie draft
- Debut: Round 24, 2025, Port Adelaide vs. Gold Coast, at Adelaide Oval
- Height: 182 cm (6 ft 0 in)
- Position: Midfielder

Club information
- Current club: Port Adelaide
- Number: 31

Playing career^{1}
Years	Club	Games (Goals)
2025–	Port Adelaide	15 (7)
- ^{1} Playing statistics correct to the end of round 22, 2026.

Ewan Mackinlay (born 18 July 2003) is an Australian rules footballer who plays for the Port Adelaide Football Club in the Australian Football League (AFL).

== Pre-AFL career ==
Mackinlay played for the Murray Bushrangers in the Talent League. Going undrafted, he played some games for Essendon in the VFL before joining the Lavington Panthers in the Ovens & Murray League in 2023.

After coming runner-up in Lavington's best and fairest Mackinlay signed with North Adelaide in the SANFL.

== AFL career ==
Mackinlay was selected by Port Adelaide with pick 11 of the 2025 mid-season rookie draft. He made his debut in round 24 of the 2025 AFL season, kicking a goal in his first match.

== Statistics ==
Updated to the end of round 22, 2026.

Legend
G	Goals	K	Kicks	D	Disposals	T	Tackles
B	Behinds	H	Handballs	M	Marks

Season	Team	No.	Games	Totals							Averages (per game)							Votes
Season	Team	No.	Games	G	B	K	H	D	M	T	G	B	K	H	D	M	T	Votes
2025	Port Adelaide	49	1	1	1	12	3	15	4	4	1.0	1.0	12.0	3.0	15.0	4.0	4.0	0
2026	Port Adelaide	31	14	6	3	104	58	162	39	36	0.4	0.2	7.4	4.1	11.6	2.8	2.6	0
Career			15	7	4	116	61	177	43	40	0.5	0.3	7.7	4.1	11.8	2.9	2.7	0
