= Max Kondogiannis =

Australian rules footballer (born 2007)

Personal information
- Born: 14 November 2007 (age 18)
- Original team: Kew Rovers
- Draft: No. 36, 2025 national draft
- Height: 191 cm (6 ft 3 in)
- Position: Defender

Club information
- Current club: Essendon
- Number: 29

Playing career
Years	Club	Games (Goals)
2026–	Essendon	12 (1)

Max Kondogiannis (born 14 November 2007) is an Australian rules footballer who plays for Essendon in the Australian Football League (AFL).

Kondogiannis was raised in Melbourne and attended Carey Baptist Grammar School, where he served as 1st XVIII captain for his final year. He is of Greek descent.

A Kew Rovers junior, Kondogiannis played for the Oakleigh Chargers in the Talent League and represented Vic Metro at the 2025 under-18s national championships, where he was amongst the side's best players in a win over Western Australia.

Kondogiannis was secured by Essendon with the 36th pick of the 2025 national draft. He had a strong pre-season with the Bombers and was rewarded with selection for their opening match of the 2026 AFL season, against Hawthorn at the Melbourne Cricket Ground. An intercepting defender, Kondogiannis finished with 12 appearances during his debut season.
