= Daniel Annable =

Australian rules footballer (born 2007)

Personal information
- Born: 5 April 2007 (age 19)
- Original team: Redland-Victoria Point (QAFL)
- Draft: No. 6, 2025 national draft
- Debut: Round 1, 2026, Brisbane Lions vs. Sydney, at Sydney Cricket Ground
- Height: 184 cm (6 ft 0 in)
- Position: Midfielder

Club information
- Current club: Brisbane Lions
- Number: 14

Playing career^{1}
Years	Club	Games (Goals)
2026–	Brisbane Lions	3 (1)
- ^{1} Playing statistics correct to the end of 2026.

Daniel Annable (born 5 April 2007) is an Australian rules footballer who plays for the Brisbane Lions in the Australian Football League (AFL).

== Early life ==
Annable hails from Redland City, Queensland, and is the youngest of three siblings. He was educated at Cleveland District State High School and played junior football for local club Redland-Victoria Point.

A midfielder, Annable joined the Brisbane Lions Academy as a 12-year old. He represented Queensland at the under 15s National Schoolboys Championships, where he was an All-Australian. In 2025, Annable captained the AFL Academy against the Richmond VFL team and was named best on ground. He also played for the Allies at that year's AFL National Championships, averaging 24.8 disposals. His performances at the championship earned him selection to the under-18s All-Australian side and he finished equal second in the Larke Medal, which was won by Dyson Sharp.

== AFL career ==
Annable was selected by the Brisbane Lions with pick six of the 2025 national draft. He made his AFL debut for the Lions in their round one fixture against the Sydney Swans at the SCG and had 13 disposals. During the match he re-dislocated a shoulder that he had injured in an earlier intra-club match. He was sidelined for four months after undergoing surgery, before returning late in the season to make a further two AFL appearances.
