= Conor Stone =

Australian football league player

Personal information
- Full name: Conor Stone
- Born: 22 April 2002 (age 24)
- Original team: Oakleigh Chargers(NAB League)/St Kevin's College/East Malvern Knights
- Draft: No. 15, 2020 AFL draft, Greater Western Sydney
- Debut: 10 April 2021, Greater Western Sydney vs. Collingwood, at Melbourne Cricket Ground
- Height: 190 cm (6 ft 3 in)
- Weight: 87 kg (192 lb)

Playing career
Years	Club	Games (Goals)
2021–2026	Greater Western Sydney	30 (8)

Conor Stone (born 22 April 2002) is a former professional Australian rules footballer who played for the Greater Western Sydney Giants in the Australian Football League (AFL). He was recruited by the Giants with the 15th draft pick in the 2020 AFL draft. He made his debut in the 30-point win against Collingwood at the Melbourne Cricket Ground in round four, 2021, in what was the Giants' first match at the ground since the 2019 AFL Grand Final. He wears guernsey number 18, which was vacated by Jeremy Cameron's departure to Geelong during the 2020 off-season.

== Statistics ==
Updated to the end of round 22, 2026.

Legend
G	Goals	K	Kicks	D	Disposals	T	Tackles
B	Behinds	H	Handballs	M	Marks

Season	Team	No.	Games	Totals							Averages (per game)							Votes
Season	Team	No.	Games	G	B	K	H	D	M	T	G	B	K	H	D	M	T	Votes
2021	Greater Western Sydney	18	5	3	1	21	14	35	8	7	0.6	0.2	4.2	2.8	7.0	1.6	1.4	0
2022	Greater Western Sydney	18	1	0	2	5	2	7	2	2	0.0	2.0	5.0	2.0	7.0	2.0	2.0	0
2023	Greater Western Sydney	18	3	0	0	7	4	11	2	5	0.0	0.0	2.3	1.3	3.7	0.7	1.7	0
2024	Greater Western Sydney	18	4	1	0	8	3	11	2	6	0.3	0.0	2.0	0.8	2.8	0.5	1.5	0
2025	Greater Western Sydney	18	7	0	0	52	46	98	29	8	0.0	0.0	7.4	6.6	14.0	4.1	1.1	0
2026	Greater Western Sydney	18	8	4	1	47	49	96	23	14	0.5	0.1	5.9	6.1	12.0	2.9	1.8	0
Career			28	8	4	140	118	258	66	42	0.3	0.1	5.0	4.2	9.2	2.4	1.5	0
