= Sam Cumming =

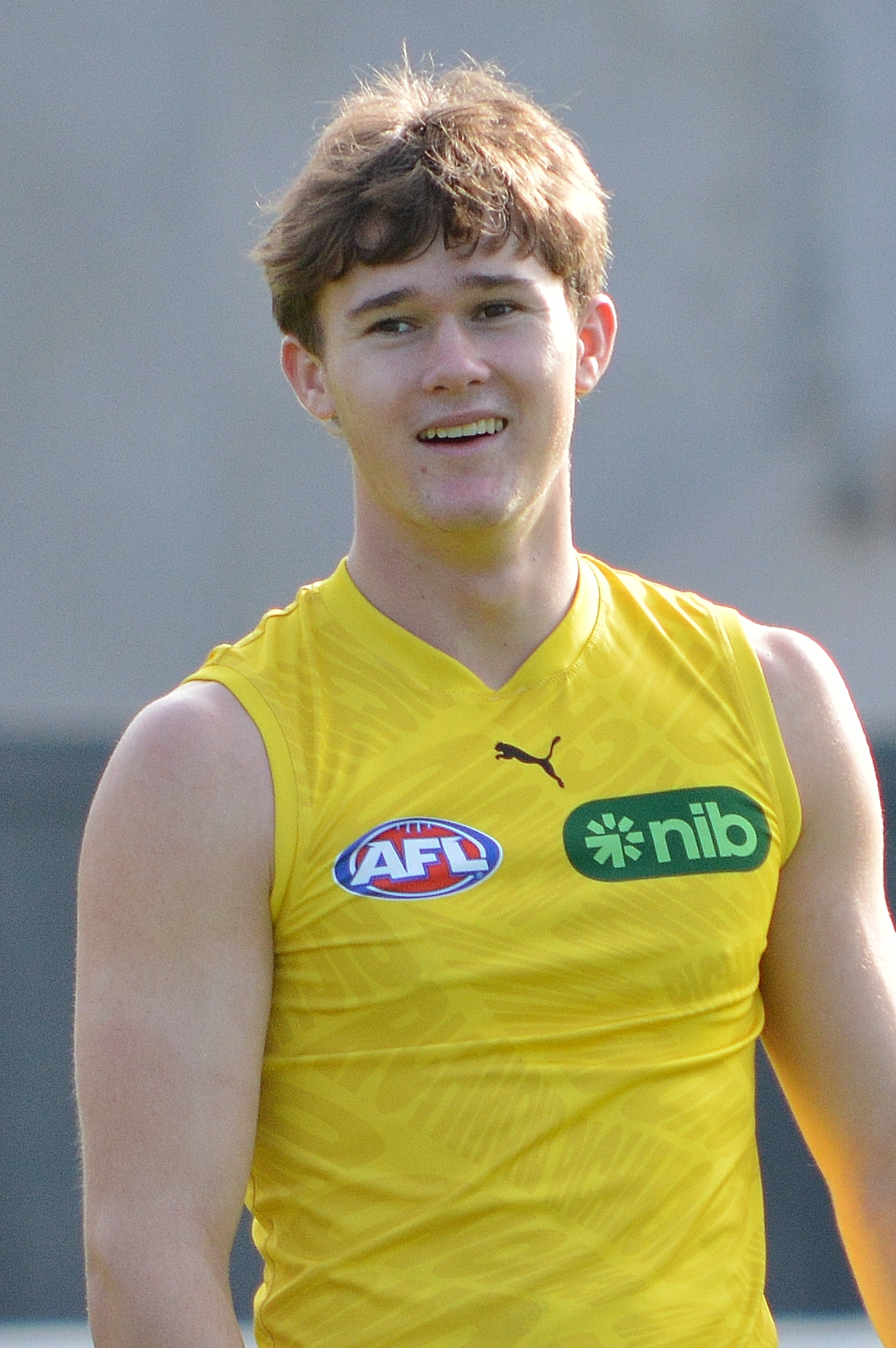
- Cumming in May 2026

Personal information
- Full name: Samuel Cumming
- Born: 27 July 2007 (age 19)
- Original teams: North Adelaide (SANFL); Wentworth (SFNL)
- Draft: No. 7, 2025 AFL draft
- Debut: Round 7, 2026, Richmond vs. Melbourne, at MCG
- Height: 184 cm (6 ft 0 in)
- Position: Midfielder

Club information
- Current club: Richmond
- Number: 22

Playing career^{1}
Years	Club	Games (Goals)
2026–	Richmond	14 (8)
- ^{1} Playing statistics correct to the end of 2026.

Career highlights
- U18 National Champion: 2025; U18 All Australian: 2025; SANFL U18 MVP: 2024

Samuel Cumming (born 27 July 2007) is a professional Australian rules footballer who plays for the Richmond Football Club in the Australian Football League (AFL). A ball-winning inside midfielder, Cumming was drafted in the first round of the 2025 AFL draft and made his debut early in the 2026 season.

== Early life and junior football ==
Cumming was born to parents Glen and Kyra and raised in Wentworth, a New South Wales town in the state's far south west and on the border with Victoria.

He played representative football at a young age, featuring in the 2022 under 15 Victorian statewide competition with the Bendigo Pioneers. In the same year, he made his senior football debut for the Wentworth Football Club in the Sunraysia Football Netball League at age 14, finishing the season having played 15 matches and being named among the side's best players in eight. He played in Wentworth's losing grand final that season and was named among its best players on the day, as well as later placing third in the club's best and fairest award.

In 2023 he began attending boarding school at Prince Alfred College in Adelaide and play junior representative football with North Adelaide Football Club.

In his year 11 season in 2024 and despite being one year younger than many of his teammates and opponents, Cumming won the South Australian National Football League Under 18 MVP award, after playing 10 matches for North Adelaide with an average of 27 disposals, 4.5 clearances and 1.1 goals. In the same year, he played two matches while representing South Australia at the Under 18 National Championships and starred in the AFL Under 17 Futures exhibition match, recording 24 disposals, 11 marks and a goal while playing as a half forward.

In the off-season prior to his final year of junior eligibility, Cumming was named a member of AFL Academy development program, during which time he took part in work experience style training with AFL club Port Adelaide. Alongside games for the club's under 18s team in 2025, he featured in four matches for the club's senior SANFL side, including a three-goal, 21 disposal and five clearance showing against South Adelaide. He played in each of South Australia's four matches at the Under 18 National Championships that year and was named as the side's vice captain. In addition to winning the National Championship with the side, Cumming was named to the All-Australian team for performances that included averaging 17 disposals and a goal a game. His season ended with a shoulder injury in the last of his senior SANFL appearances that season.

Prior to the 2025 AFL draft, Cumming was projected to be taken with the 7th overall pick by AFL Media, 8th overall pick by Fox Sports and the 9th pick by ESPN.

== AFL career ==
Cumming was drafted by Richmond with the club's first selection and the seventh pick overall in the 2025 AFL draft.

He made his first appearances for the club in two pre-season matches in February 2026. In the last of those two matches, Cumming suffered a subluxation of his right shoulder, repeating an injury he sustained late in his previous junior season. He returned to matchplay through the club's reserves side in the VFL in April. In his second match at the level, Cumming was awarded best on ground honours with 30 disposals and one goal against the AFL Academy Under 18 exhibition side. Following that performance, Cumming was named to make his AFL debut in the ANZAC Day eve match against Melbourne at the MCG.

== Player profile ==
Cumming plays as a ball-winning inside midfielder and resting forward. In his junior seasons, Cumming was noted for his hardness and physicality in the contest and overhead marking skills. At the same time, his playing style drew comparisons to Rory Sloane and Isaac Heeney.

== Statistics ==
Updated to the end of round 22, 2026.

Legend
G	Goals	K	Kicks	D	Disposals	T	Tackles
B	Behinds	H	Handballs	M	Marks

Season	Team	No.	Games	Totals							Averages (per game)							Votes
Season	Team	No.	Games	G	B	K	H	D	M	T	G	B	K	H	D	M	T	Votes
2026	Richmond	22	14	8	2	93	123	216	40	38	0.6	0.1	6.6	8.8	15.4	2.9	2.7	0
Career			14	8	2	93	123	216	40	38	0.6	0.1	6.6	8.8	15.4	2.9	2.7	0
