= Lachlan Carmichael =

Personal information
- Born: 27 August 2007 (age 19)
- Original team: Mosman Swans/North Shore
- Draft: No. 21, 2025 national draft
- Height: 184 cm (6 ft 0 in)
- Position: Defender

Club information
- Current club: Western Bulldogs
- Number: 2

Playing career
Years	Club	Games (Goals)
2026–	Western Bulldogs	2 (0)

Lachlan Carmichael (born 27 August 2007) is an Australian rules footballer who plays for the Western Bulldogs in the Australian Football League (AFL).

Carmichael attended Scots College in Sydney and came through the Sydney Swans Academy, playing his early football for the Mosman Swans and North Shore. He represented the academy at the 2023 under-16s AFL National Development Championships, earning All-Australian honours, and was the MVP award-winner for the Allies at the 2025 AFL under-18s National Championships, where he was again an All-Australian.

Overlooked by the Swans, Carmichael was selected by the Western Bulldogs with pick 21 in the 2025 national draft. He gained experience as a half back in the VFL during 2026 and late in the AFL season made two senior appearances, debuting in their match against Carlton in round 23 which ended in a draw.
