= Jack Watkins (Australian rules footballer) =

Australian rules footballer (born 2000)

Personal information
- Born: 18 December 2000 (age 25)
- Original team: Melton South
- Draft: No. 4, 2026 rookie draft
- Height: 176 cm (5 ft 9 in)
- Position: Midfielder

Club information
- Current club: Port Adelaide
- Number: 37

Playing career
Years	Club	Games (Goals)
2026–	Port Adelaide	11 (3)

Jack Watkins (born 18 December 2000) is an Australian rules footballer who plays for Port Adelaide in the Australian Football League (AFL).

A Melton South junior, Watkins later moved to Melton to play with his brother Lachie. He played for the Western Jets in the Talent League in 2018 and after being overlooked in the draft spent some time with Werribee. From 2021 to 2024, Watkins competed in North Melbourne's VFL side, winning their best and fairest as captain for his final two seasons. He was a member of the 2024 "VFL Team of the Year".

Watkins trained with Port Adelaide in the 2025 pre-season with a view on earning a contract during the supplemental selection period. Port Adelaide instead signed Josh Lai and Watkins spent the 2025 SANFL season playing for the Magpies. After a strong season in which he averaged 27 disposals from 18 games, Watkins won the club's best and fairest award, while also earning a place on the "SANFL Team of the Year". He was subsequently secured by Port Adelaide with pick four in the 2026 rookie draft. During his first AFL season in 2026, Watkins featured in 11 matches for the Power, debuting in the club's season opener against his former club North Melbourne.
