= Jack Ison =

Personal information
- Born: 26 March 2007 (age 19)
- Original teams: Parkside (VAFA); Oakleigh Chargers (Talent League)
- Draft: No. 47, 2025 AFL draft
- Debut: Round 10, 2026, Carlton vs. Western Bulldogs, at Docklands Stadium
- Height: 190 cm (6 ft 3 in)
- Position: Midfielder/Forward

Club information
- Current club: Carlton
- Number: 30

Playing career^{1}
Years	Club	Games (Goals)
2026–	Carlton	8 (3)
- ^{1} Playing statistics correct to the end of round 22, 2026.

Jack Ison (born 26 March 2007) is a professional Australian rules footballer who plays for the Carlton Football Club in the Australian Football League (AFL).

== Junior career ==
Ison played junior football for the Parkside Football Club in the VAFA, playing 110 games at junior level as well as two senior games at the age of 17. Ison played in the Talent League for the Oakleigh Chargers, and represented Vic Metro in the Under 18 Championships.

Ison was part of Carlton's Next Generation Academy, granting them priority access for him at the draft.

== AFL career ==
Ison was bid on at pick 47 of the 2025 AFL draft by North Melbourne, with Carlton matching the bid as he was part of their Next Generation Academy. He was selected to make his debut in round 10 of the 2026 AFL season. He had 15 disposals and kicked a goal on debut.

== Personal life ==
Ison is an Indigenous Australian, of Yorta Yorta and Wiradjuri descent. He is the nephew of Australian rapper Briggs.

Ison attended school at Scotch College.

== Statistics ==
Updated to the end of round 22, 2026.

Legend
G	Goals	K	Kicks	D	Disposals	T	Tackles
B	Behinds	H	Handballs	M	Marks

Season	Team	No.	Games	Totals							Averages (per game)							Votes
Season	Team	No.	Games	G	B	K	H	D	M	T	G	B	K	H	D	M	T	Votes
2026	Carlton	30	8	3	10	60	30	90	30	13	0.4	1.3	7.5	3.8	11.3	3.8	1.6	0
Career			8	3	10	60	30	90	30	13	0.4	1.3	7.5	3.8	11.3	3.8	1.6	0
