= Cody Curtin =

Personal information
- Born: 18 May 2007 (age 19)
- Original teams: Claremont (WAFL); West Coast JFC
- Draft: No. 43, 2025 national draft
- Debut: Round 8, 2026, Brisbane Lions vs. Essendon, at Docklands Stadium
- Height: 200 cm (6 ft 7 in)
- Position: Key Forward

Club information
- Current club: Brisbane Lions
- Number: 37

Playing career^{1}
Years	Club	Games (Goals)
2026–	Brisbane Lions	4 (2)
- ^{1} Playing statistics correct to the end of round 22, 2026.

Cody Curtin (born 18 May 2007) is a professional Australian rules footballer who plays for the Brisbane Lions in the Australian Football League (AFL).

== Junior career ==
Curtin played junior football with the West Coast Junior Football Club, joining Claremont in the WAFL Colts at the start of 2024. In 2024, Curtin played predominantly as a key defender before swinging forward late in the season. He kicked 13 goals from three games playing as a forward. He did this while playing PSA footy for Scotch College.

In his draft year, Curtin kicked 32 goals from nine games for Claremont. He also played for Western Australia at the Under 18 Championships, averaging 8.5 disposals and 1.5 goals a game.

== AFL career ==
Curtin was drafted by the Brisbane Lions with pick 43 of the 2025 national draft. He was selected to make his debut in round 8 of the 2026 AFL season. Curtin was selected as an emergency in the 2026 AFL Grand Final. While he did not play, the Lions went on to win a third successive premiership.

== Personal life ==
Growing up, Curtin was a supporter of the Fremantle Football Club.

Curtin's brother, Daniel Curtin, is a professional Australian Rules Footballer with the Adelaide Crows. Curtin attended school at Scotch College, Perth.

== Statistics ==
Updated to the end of round 22, 2026.

Legend
G	Goals	K	Kicks	D	Disposals	T	Tackles
B	Behinds	H	Handballs	M	Marks

Season	Team	No.	Games	Totals							Averages (per game)							Votes
Season	Team	No.	Games	G	B	K	H	D	M	T	G	B	K	H	D	M	T	Votes
2026	Brisbane Lions	37	4	2	2	11	15	26	5	4	0.5	0.5	2.8	3.8	6.5	1.3	1.0	0
Career			4	2	2	11	15	26	5	4	0.5	0.5	2.8	3.8	6.5	1.3	1.0	0
