= Noah Roberts-Thomson =

Australian rules footballer (born 2007)

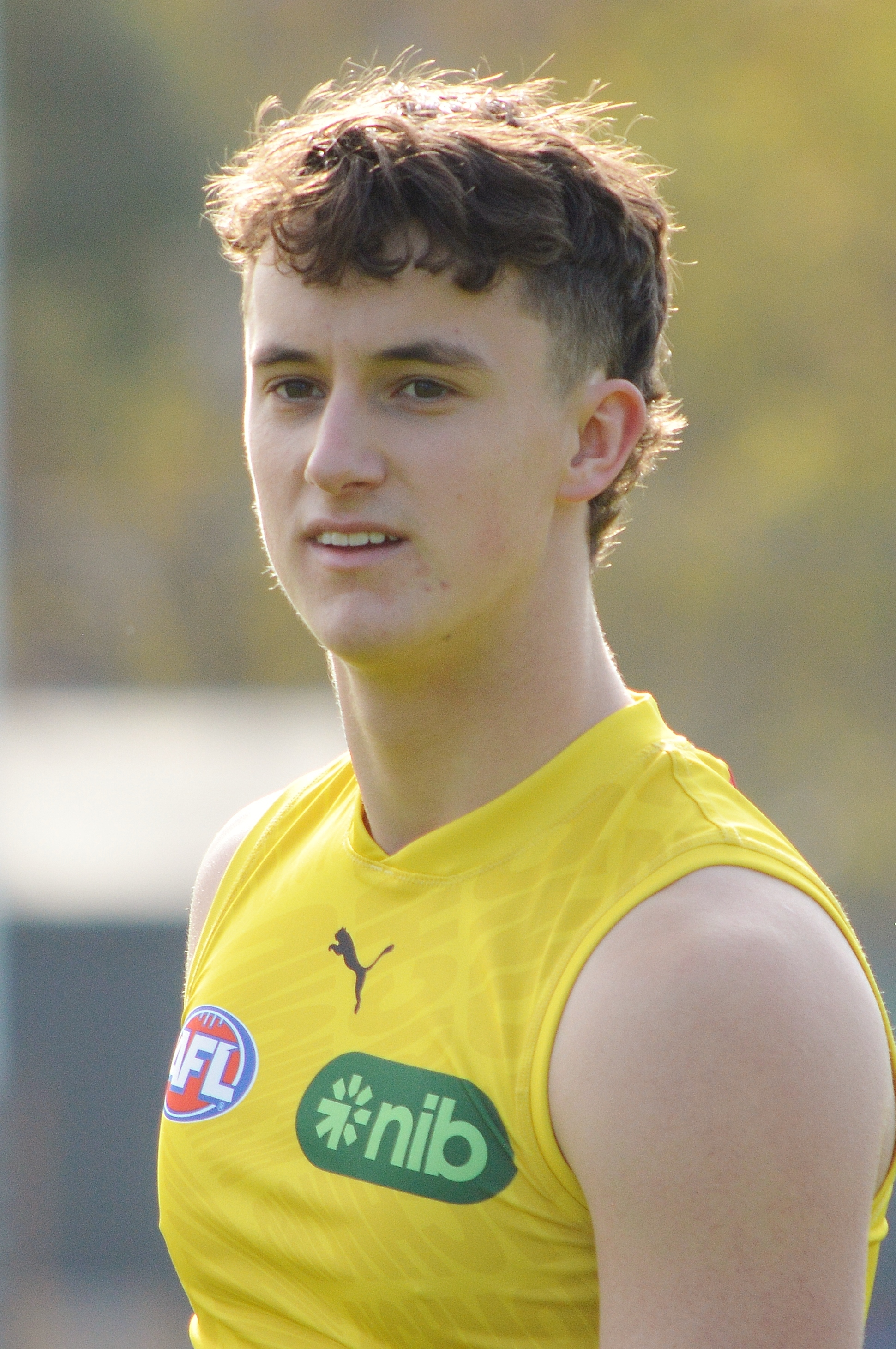
- Roberts-Thomson in May 2026

Personal information
- Full name: Noah
- Nickname: NRT
- Born: 29 March 2007 (age 19)
- Original teams: Sturt (SANFL); Unley (AdFL)
- Draft: No. 54, 2025 AFL draft
- Debut: Round 10, 2026, Richmond vs. St Kilda, at Docklands Stadium
- Height: 182 cm (6 ft 0 in)
- Position: Forward

Club information
- Current club: Richmond
- Number: 27

Playing career^{1}
| Years | Club | Games (Goals) |
| 2026– | Richmond | 3 (4) |
- ^{1} Playing statistics correct to the end of 2026.

Career highlights
- U18 National Champion: 2025

Noah Roberts-Thomson (born 29 March 2007) is a professional Australian rules footballer who plays for the Richmond Football Club in the Australian Football League (AFL). A hard-running forward, Roberts-Thomson was drafted in the third round of the 2025 AFL draft and made his debut mid-way through the 2026 season.

== Early life and junior football ==
Roberts-Thomson played junior football with Unley Football club in the junior ranks of the Adelaide Footy League. He attended high school at Pembroke School and played for the school's football side in year 11 and 12. He represented South Australia and served in the team's leadership at the 2023 Under 16 National Championships.

In 2025, Roberts-Thomson played Under 18s football for Sturt Football Club, winning a premiership in the U18 division of the South Australian National Football League while averaging 23 disposals and more than a goal per game. He was a member of the championship winning South Australia side at the Under 18 National Championships that same year and averaged 6.3 score involvements across four matches at the tournament.

At the October 2025 pre-draft Combine, Roberts-Thomson recorded top six scores in the 20 metre sprint (2.916 seconds) and agility test (8.024 seconds).

== AFL career ==
Roberts-Thomson was drafted by Richmond with the club's fourth selection and the 54th pick overall in the 2025 AFL draft.

He made his first appearance for the club in an informal pre-season match against Essendon in February 2026, before spending the early months of the 2026 season with the club's reserves side in the VFL. There he played in each of the first six games of the season, kicking four goals, averaging 12.6 disposals and putting in an 18 disposal and one goal game against Williamstown in early May.

Following that performances and in the midst of an injury crisis which left the club with only three uninjured and unselected players on its AFL list, Roberts-Thomson was named to make his AFL debut in round 10's match against St Kilda at Docklands Stadium. He kicked two goals in the match, becoming the fourth player in club history to kick two goals with his first two kicks at senior level.

== Player profile ==
Roberts-Thomson plays as a transition running small forward. He is a left foot kicker. In his junior years he played as a versatile utility, across the wing and forward lines but primarily as an inside midfielder.

== Personal life ==
He is the younger cousin to former Sydney premiership player Lewis Roberts-Thomson.

== Statistics ==
Updated to the end of round 22, 2026.

Legend
| G | Goals | K | Kicks | D | Disposals | T | Tackles |
| B | Behinds | H | Handballs | M | Marks |

| Season | Team | No. | Games | Totals | | | | | | | Averages (per game) | | | | | | | Votes |
| Season | Team | No. | Games | G | B | K | H | D | M | T | G | B | K | H | D | M | T | Votes |
|---|---|---|---|---|---|---|---|---|---|---|---|---|---|---|---|---|---|---|
| 2026 | Richmond | 27 | 3 | 4 | 0 | 14 | 4 | 18 | 4 | 6 | 1.3 | 0.0 | 4.7 | 1.3 | 6.0 | 1.3 | 2.0 | 0 |
| Career | | | 3 | 4 | 0 | 14 | 4 | 18 | 4 | 6 | 1.3 | 0.0 | 4.7 | 1.3 | 6.0 | 1.3 | 2.0 | 0 |
