= Mitch Zadow =

Australian rules footballer (born 2004)

Personal information
- Full name: Mitchell Zadow
- Born: 11 March 2004 (age 22)
- Original team: Pinjarra
- Draft: Pre-season supplementary signing, 2025 national draft
- Height: 180 cm (5 ft 11 in)
- Weight: 82 kg (181 lb)
- Position: Forward

Club information
- Current club: Port Adelaide
- Number: 39

Playing career
| Years | Club | Games (Goals) |
| 2026– | Port Adelaide | 9 (8) |

Mitchell Zadow (born 11 March 2004) is an Australian rules footballer who plays for Port Adelaide in the Australian Football League (AFL).

Originally from Pinjarra, Western Australia, Zadow focussed more on cricket during his youth and was a state representative at the national schoolboys championships, before giving it up to play in the WAFL.

Zadow, a small forward, debuted in the WAFL for East Fremantle in 2024, having made his way up via the colts, and kicked 18 goals from 14 games in the 2025 WAFL season. While employed as a Trinity College groundskeeper, Zadow joined Port Adelaide as a supplemental selection period signing in the 2026 pre-season.

During the 2026 AFL season, Zadow played in nine games for Port Adelaide, debuting against Richmond in round four. He didn't make his second appearance until round 16, but from then on missed only one of Port Adelaide's remaining games, which included a career-best three goals against ladder leaders Fremantle. At the conclusion of the season he signed a one-year contract extension through to the end of 2027.
