= Xavier Taylor =

Australian rules footballer (born 2007)

Personal information
- Born: 30 January 2007 (age 19)
- Original team: East Ringwood
- Draft: No. 11, 2025 national draft
- Height: 192 cm (6 ft 4 in)
- Position: Defender

Club information
- Current club: Melbourne
- Number: 19

Playing career
Years	Club	Games (Goals)
2026–	Melbourne	3 (0)

Xavier Taylor (born 30 January 2007) is an Australian rules footballer who plays for Melbourne in the Australian Football League (AFL).

Taylor joined the Sports Academy at Rowville Secondary College while in Year 10 and was coached at the school by former Essendon player Darren Bewick. He played his junior football for East Ringwood, a club his father Cameron had played for. After leaving school, Taylor held part-time jobs at a factory and Kilsyth Basketball Stadium.

A defender, Taylor had a standout season with Eastern Ranges in 2025 and was centre half back in the "Talent League Team of the Year". He also won the Eastern Ranges best and fairest and was awarded best on ground in their grand final win over the Dandenong Stingrays, amassing 25 disposals and 15 marks. After a strong campaign for Vic Metro, Taylor entered the AFL Draft Combine and placed third in the agility test.

Taylor was selected by Melbourne with pick 11 in the 2025 national draft. He made his AFL debut in Melbourne's two-point win over the Brisbane Lions at the MCG in round six, and held his place for their next fixture against Richmond, before returning to the VFL. His third and final appearance of the season came in the wildcard playoff loss to Carlton, having replaced Christian Salem in the lineup.
