= Harry Kyle =

Australian rules footballer (born 2007)

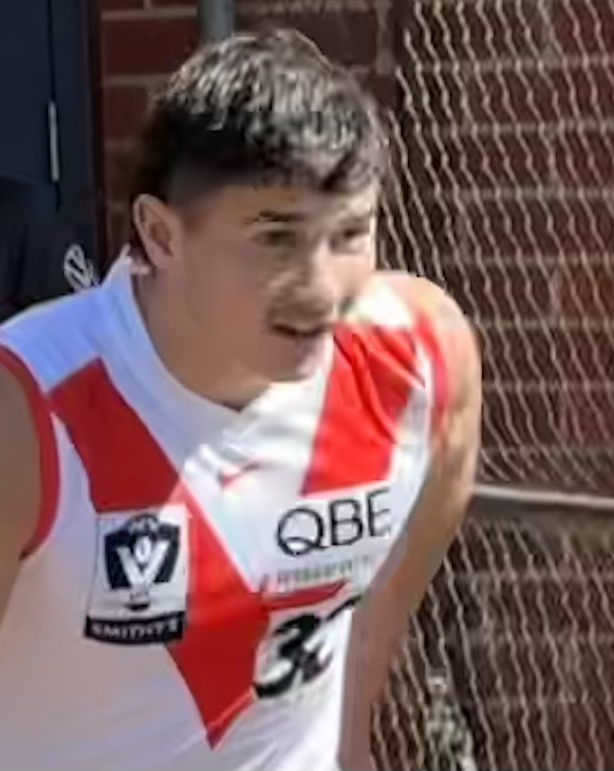
- Kyle in 2026

Personal information
- Born: 16 July 2007 (age 19)
- Original teams: UNSW-East (AFL Sydney); Sydney Swans Academy
- Draft: No. 14, 2025 national draft
- Debut: Round 12, 2026, Sydney vs. Richmond, at the SCG
- Height: 188 cm (6 ft 2 in)
- Position: Medium defender/midfielder

Club information
- Current club: Sydney
- Number: 32

Playing career^{1}
Years	Club	Games (Goals)
2026–	Sydney	12 (1)
- ^{1} Playing statistics correct to the end of the 2026 season.

Harry Kyle is an Australian rules footballer who plays for the Sydney Swans in the Australian Football League (AFL).

== Early life and junior football ==
Kyle grew up in the Northern Sydney to Victorian parents and attended Scots College. He participated in rugby union, basketball and swimming, only playing Australian rules football occasionally prior to switching codes in 2024. He joined the Sydney Swans Academy that same year, after emailing and being given a four-week try-out.

He played his first full season of junior football in 2025, for the UNSW-Eastern Suburbs Bulldogs, and was invited to the 2025 AFL Draft Combine. He was also picked for the 2025 AFL National Championships, as a member of the Allies, and was a part of their line-up for the entire championship.

== AFL career ==
Kyle was recruited to the Sydney Swans with the 14th draft pick during the 2025 national draft. He made his debut in Round 12 of the 2026 AFL season against Richmond, replacing an injured Callum Mills. He kicked his first goal in the AFL during the team's Round 24 clash against North Melbourne.

== Statistics ==
Updated to the end of the 2026 season.

Legend
G	Goals	K	Kicks	D	Disposals	T	Tackles
B	Behinds	H	Handballs	M	Marks

Season	Team	No.	Games	Totals							Averages (per game)							Votes
Season	Team	No.	Games	G	B	K	H	D	M	T	G	B	K	H	D	M	T	Votes
2026	Sydney	32	12	1	0	64	75	139	26	22	0.1	0.0	5.3	6.3	11.6	2.2	1.8	
Career			12	1	0	64	75	139	26	22	0.1	0.0	5.3	6.3	11.6	2.2	1.8	
