= Billy Cootee =

Personal information
- Born: 18 December 2002 (age 23); Mount Beauty, Victoria
- Original teams: Dederang-Mt Beauty (TDFL); Essendon Doutta Stars (EDFL); Western Jets (Talent League); Essendon (VFL); Norwood (SANFL)
- Draft: No. 42, 2025 AFL draft
- Debut: Round 7, 2026, Sydney vs. Western Bulldogs, at Docklands Stadium
- Height: 178 cm (5 ft 10 in)
- Position: Forward

Club information
- Current club: Sydney
- Number: 25

Playing career^{1}
Years	Club	Games (Goals)
2026–	Sydney	11 (12)
- ^{1} Playing statistics correct to the end of the 2026 season.

Billy Cootee (born 18 December 2002) is a professional Australian rules footballer who plays for the Sydney Swans in the Australian Football League (AFL).

== Early life and Pre-AFL career ==
Cootee grew up in Mount Beauty, Victoria. He attended Mount Beauty Primary School, and played junior football for the Dederang-Mt Beauty Football Club in the Tallangatta & District Football League. Cootee also played Cricket growing up, playing for the Wodonga Raiders Cricket Club.

Cootee made the move to Melbourne for school, where he attended the Maribyrnong Sports Academy. Following his move to Melbourne, he joined local side the Essendon Doutta Stars Football Club in the Essendon District Football League.

Cootee played for the Western Jets in the Talent League in 2019 and 2021. In 2019, Cootee also featured in the Victorian Metro U17 State Squad for the Under-17 National Championships in cricket.

After going undrafted, Cootee began playing for Essendon in the VFL in 2021. In 2023, at the age of 20, he was named as captain. Following the end of the 2023 VFL season, Cootee moved to South Australia, where he joined Norwood in the SANFL.

== AFL career ==
After averaging 23 disposals, 5 clearances and a goal per game for Norwood, and winning the Michael Taylor Medal in 2025 as the club's best and fairest player, Cootee was selected by the Sydney Swans with pick 42 of the 2025 AFL draft. He was selected to make his debut in round 7 of the 2026 AFL season.

== Statistics ==
Updated to the end of the 2026 season.

Legend
G	Goals	K	Kicks	D	Disposals	T	Tackles
B	Behinds	H	Handballs	M	Marks

Season	Team	No.	Games	Totals							Averages (per game)							Votes
Season	Team	No.	Games	G	B	K	H	D	M	T	G	B	K	H	D	M	T	Votes
2026	Sydney	25	11	12	4	57	54	111	27	34	1.1	0.3	5.2	4.9	10.1	2.5	3.1	0
Career			11	12	4	57	54	111	27	34	1.1	0.3	5.2	4.9	10.1	2.5	3.1	0
