= Balyn O'Brien =

Personal information
- Born: 26 January 2007 (age 19)
- Original teams: Central Eyre United (EEFL); Norwood (SANFL)
- Draft: 2026 pre-season supplemental selection period signing
- Debut: Round 19, 2026, Port Adelaide vs. Fremantle, at Adelaide Oval
- Height: 187 cm (6 ft 2 in)
- Position: Defender

Club information
- Current club: Port Adelaide
- Number: 41

Playing career^{1}
Years	Club	Games (Goals)
2026–	Port Adelaide	4 (0)
- ^{1} Playing statistics correct to the end of round 22, 2026.

Balyn O'Brien (born 26 January 2007) is a professional Australian rules footballer who plays for the Port Adelaide Football Club in the Australian Football League (AFL).

== Junior career ==
O'Brien played local football for Central Eyre United in the Eastern Eyre Football League. He played in the SANFL U18s for Norwood and represented South Australia at the Under 18 Championships.

In round 17 of the 2025 SANFL season, O'Brien made his debut for Norwood's senior team. He would go on to play six games for Norwood's senior side, including their finals campaign.

== AFL career ==
Ahead of the 2026 AFL season, O'Brien was invited to train with Port Adelaide to earn a list spot during the 2026 pre-season supplemental selection period. He was eventually added to Port Adelaide's list on 23 February.

In round 19 of the 2026 AFL season, O'Brien was selected to make his debut for Port Adelaide against Fremantle. At the end of the 2026 season, O'Brien signed a one-year contract extension with Port Adelaide to the end of 2027.

== Statistics ==
Updated to the end of round 22, 2026.

Legend
G	Goals	K	Kicks	D	Disposals	T	Tackles
B	Behinds	H	Handballs	M	Marks

Season	Team	No.	Games	Totals							Averages (per game)							Votes
Season	Team	No.	Games	G	B	K	H	D	M	T	G	B	K	H	D	M	T	Votes
2026	Port Adelaide	41	4	0	0	13	10	23	7	9	0.0	0.0	3.3	2.5	5.8	1.8	2.3	0
Career			4	0	0	13	10	23	7	9	0.0	0.0	3.3	2.5	5.8	1.8	2.3	0
