= Hussien El Achkar =

Australian rules footballer (born 2007)

Personal information
- Born: 2 April 2007 (age 19)
- Original team: Pascoe Vale
- Draft: No. 53, 2025 national draft
- Height: 171 cm (5 ft 7 in)
- Position: Forward

Club information
- Current club: Essendon
- Number: 33

Playing career
Years	Club	Games (Goals)
2026–	Essendon	9 (10)

Hussien El Achkar (born 2 April 2007) is an Australian rules footballer who plays for Essendon in the Australian Football League (AFL).

El Achkar grew up in Melbourne, attending Essendon Keilor College. His parents are emigrants from Lebanon and he is a cousin of Adam Saad. He is a Muslim.

A forward, El Achkar came through Essendon's Next Generation Academy and was also supported by the Bachar Houli Foundation. He amassed 47 goals during two seasons in the Talent League with the Calder Cannons and represented Vic Metro at the under-18s national championships, kicking three goals against the Allies.

El Achkar was elected by Essendon with pick 53 of the 2025 national draft after the club matched a bid from Richmond. After kicking three second-half goals on his VFL debut in 2026, El Achkar played his maiden AFL game in Essendon's season opener against Hawthorn at the Melbourne Cricket Ground. He ended 2026 with nine AFL appearances, most of them in the second half of the season.
