= Noah Howes =

Australian rules footballer (born 2005)

Personal information
- Born: 28 October 2005 (age 21)
- Original teams: Port Noarlunga (SFL); South Adelaide (SANFL)
- Draft: No. 15, 2025 mid-season rookie draft
- Debut: Round 22, 2026, Collingwood vs. West Coast, at Perth Stadium
- Height: 196 cm (6 ft 5 in)
- Position: Key Defender

Playing career^{1}
Years	Club	Games (Goals)
2025–2026	Collingwood	2 (0)
- ^{1} Playing statistics correct to the end of round 24, 2026.

Noah Howes (born 28 October 2005) is a professional Australian rules footballer who played for the Collingwood Football Club in the Australian Football League (AFL). At state level he played for the South Adelaide Football Club in the South Australian National Football League (SANFL).

== State career ==
Howes played local football for Port Noarlunga in the Southern Football League. He played in the SANFL Under 18s for South Adelaide and represented South Australia during the 2024 Under 18 National Championships as an overage player.

Howes made his SANFL league debut for South Adelaide in round 1 of the 2024 SANFL season. In his fifth game in the league he kicked three goals, took seven marks, and laid three tackles against Glenelg, winning the round's Breakthrough Player award.

== AFL career ==
Howes was selected by Collingwood with pick 15 of the 2025 mid-season rookie draft. At the end of the 2025 AFL season, Howes signed a one-year contract extension with Collingwood to the end of 2026.

Though his first six months at the club, he played as a key forward, in 2026, Howes was swung back and was a key defender over 12 VFL games. Over 22 VFL games, he averaged 11 disposals and 4.1 marks per game. Howes made his AFL debut in round 22 of the 2026 AFL season against West Coast at Optus Stadium.

In October 2026, Collingwood announced that they delisted Howes after not offering him a new contract. However, the club stated they remain open to considering him as part of preparations for the upcoming national and rookie drafts.
