= Tom Burton (footballer) =

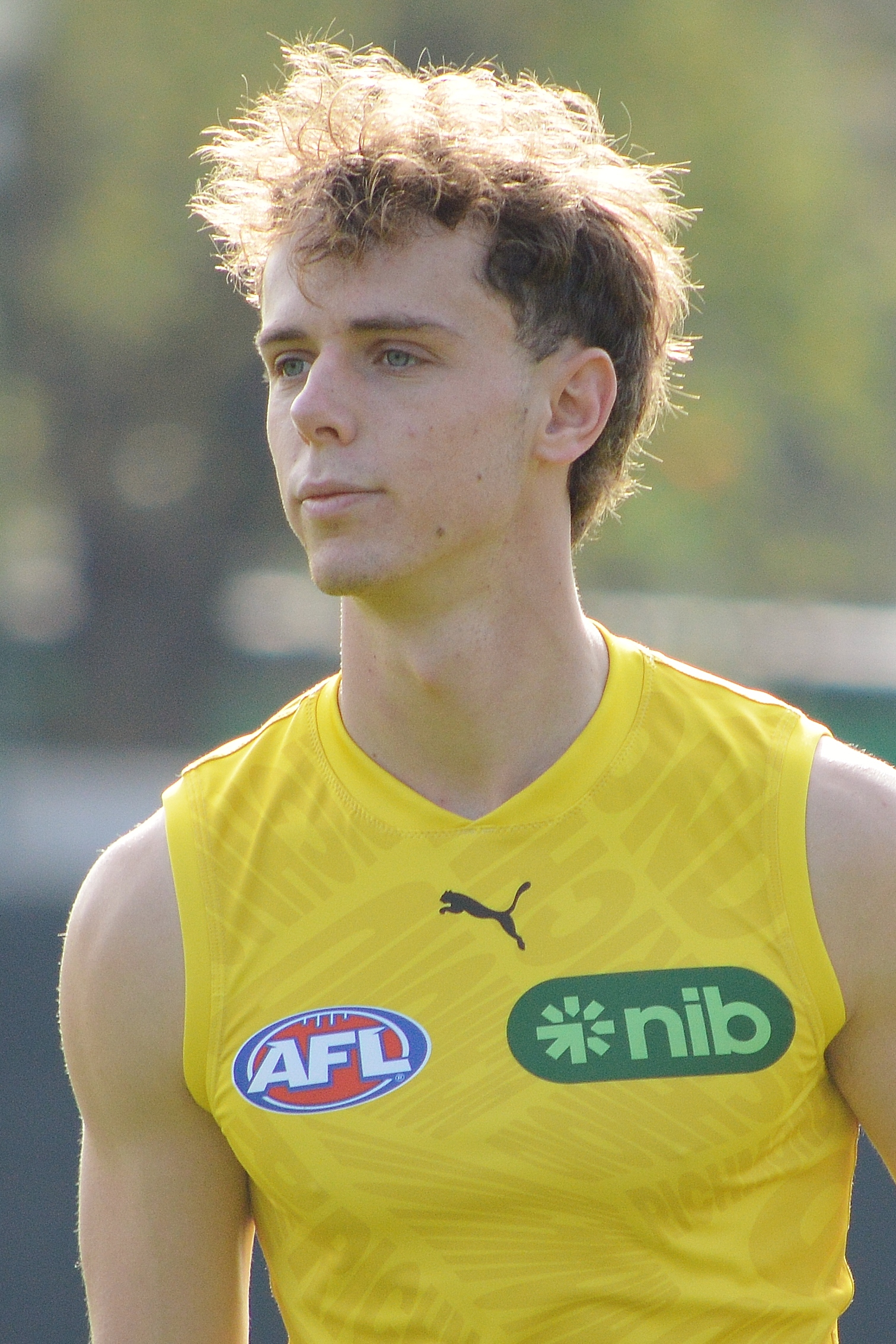
- Burton in May 2026

Personal information
- Full name: Thomas Burton
- Born: 9 January 2007 (age 19)
- Original teams: Western Jets (Talent League); Point Cook (WRFL)
- Draft: 2026 Pre-season supplemental selection period signing
- Debut: Round 7, 2026, Richmond vs. Melbourne, at MCG
- Height: 178 cm (5 ft 10 in)
- Position: Forward

Club information
- Current club: Richmond
- Number: 45

Playing career^{1}
Years	Club	Games (Goals)
2026–	Richmond	5 (0)
- ^{1} Playing statistics correct to the end of 2026.

Career highlights
- Talent League Team of the Year: 2025

Thomas Burton (born 9 January 2007) is an Australian rules footballer who plays for the Richmond Football Club in the Australian Football League (AFL). An endurance running half-forward, Burton was signed as a train-on player by Richmond in the 2026 pre-season, after being overlooked by all 18 AFL clubs in the draft periods at the end of the 2025 season.

== Early life and junior football ==
Burton grew up in Point Cook, a suburb 22 kilometres south-west of Melbourne. He played junior football with the local Point Cook Football Club in the Western Region Football League from under 9s level. He won the league's Under 16 division 1 best and fairest award in 2022 and made his senior debut for the club at age 16 in the 2023 league division 1 grand final.

Burton played representative football for Victorian state sides at Under 14 and Under 15 level, including being named Under 15 All-Australian in 2022. He also represented the Victorian Metropolitan region the Under 16 National Championships in 2023 and played his first matches for the Western Jets in the top-level junior competition the Talent League. In the same year he received a scholarship to attend and play for Caulfield Grammar School, where he remained through the conclusion of year 12 studies in 2024. Burton also played in the 2024 AFL Futures game for players in the penultimate season of junior eligibility, in which he recorded 26 disposals.

Burton was selected as a member of the AFL Academy ahead of the 2025 season. As part of the program, he completed a pre-season training period with AFL club the Western Bulldogs and played matches with an academy side against VFL teams including the Richmond reserves in April, where he recorded 20 disposals. During that final year of junior eligibility, Burton began university studies while continuing to play with the Western Jets. Over 12 matches as captain of the Jets in 2025, he averaged 29.6 disposals and 4.4 tackles per game, while leading the league for total disposals. For his exceptional performances that season, Burton was named the Jets best and fairest player and was selected to the Talent League Team of the Year. In that season, Burton was selected to represent Victoria's metropolitan region at the 2025 AFL Under 18 Championships and was named the side's co-captain. He played four matches at the carnival and averaged 15.5 disposals.

At the 2025 national draft combine, Burton recorded top five results in the 20 metre sprint (2.916 seconds) and standing vertical jump (74 cm) tests. In the week prior to the 2025 AFL draft, he was listed as a top 40 prospect by ESPN.

Despite his accomplishments as a junior, Burton was overlooked by all 18 AFL clubs in both the national and rookie drafts of November 2025.

== AFL career ==
In the days immediately following the drafts, Burton accepted a place in Richmond's pre-season training squad. After a three-month period in the program, he was offered a contract under the pre-season supplemental selection period rules, taking up the final slot on the club's 2026 list.

He started the season with the club's reserves side in the Victorian Football League, featuring in three matches over March and April, with an average of 17 disposals and 1.3 goals per game. Burton made his AFL debut in round 7 of the 2026 season, in the ANZAC Day eve match against Melbourne at the MCG.

== Player profile ==
Burton plays as a high half forward and is notable for his transition running. In his junior years, Burton played as a rebounding defender and midfielder.

== Statistics ==
Updated to the end of round 22, 2026.

Legend
G	Goals	K	Kicks	D	Disposals	T	Tackles
B	Behinds	H	Handballs	M	Marks

Season	Team	No.	Games	Totals							Averages (per game)							Votes
Season	Team	No.	Games	G	B	K	H	D	M	T	G	B	K	H	D	M	T	Votes
2026	Richmond	45	5	0	2	22	31	53	4	5	0.0	0.4	4.4	6.2	10.6	0.8	1.0	0
Career			5	0	2	22	31	53	4	5	0.0	0.4	4.4	6.2	10.6	0.8	1.0	0
