= Charlie Banfield =

Australian rules footballer (born 2007)

Personal information
- Born: 18 July 2007 (age 19)
- Original team: Swanbourne JFC
- Draft: No. 41, 2025 national draft
- Height: 192 cm (6 ft 4 in)
- Position: Midfielder

Club information
- Current club: St Kilda
- Number: 36

Playing career
Years	Club	Games (Goals)
2026–	St Kilda	3 (1)

Charlie Banfield (born 18 July 2007) is an Australian rules footballer who plays for St Kilda in the Australian Football League (AFL).

Banfield is the middle son of dual West Coast Eagles premiership player Drew Banfield. His younger brother Harper and elder brother Bailey (not to be confused with the Fremantle player) have both played for Claremont. He also has one sister and is a cousin of Matilda Banfield who plays in the AFLW.

A hard-running midfielder, Banfield is a product of Perth club Swanbourne JFC and played in the first XVIII at Scotch College. He came through the colts at Claremont, where he featured in back to back premierships in 2024 and 2025, winning the Mel Whinnen Medal for his performance in the 2025 grand final. He had the best time for the 2km time trial at the WA State Draft Combine.

Banfield played in the reserves for West Coast during the 2025 WAFL season. Eligible to be a father-son pick for the Eagles, Banfield was passed on by the club at the 2025 national draft, due to them having no further spots available on their list, and instead went to St Kilda with pick 41. He played three games in the 2026 AFL season, appearing in the side from rounds 10 to 12.

In October 2026, Banfield was involved in an incident where he accidentally ran over a friend with his car during a camping trip in Yallingup. His friend was hospitalised with broken bones. No charges were laid over the incident.
