= Jayden Laverde =

Australian rules footballer

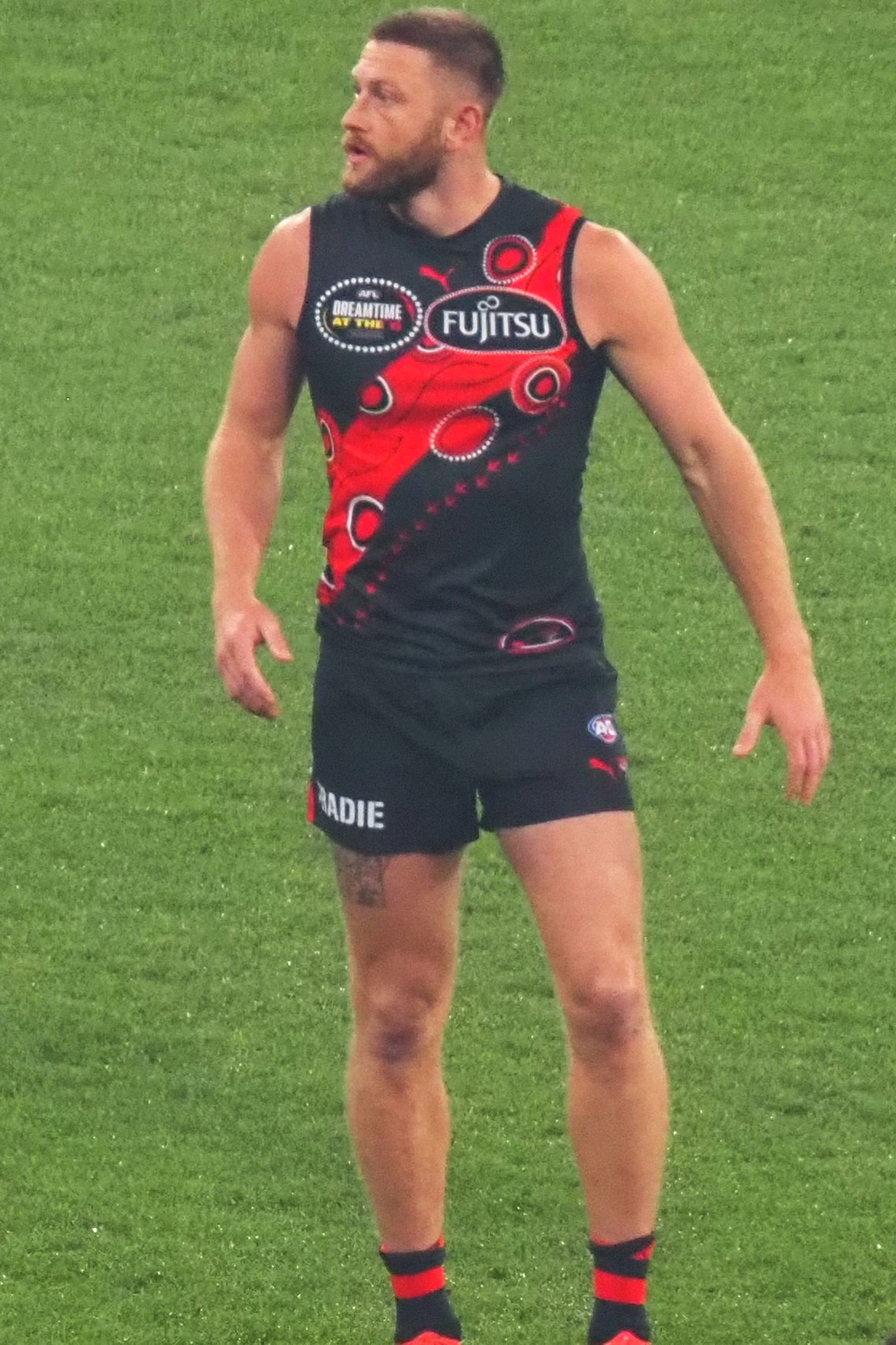
- Laverde playing for Essendon in 2025

Personal information
- Full name: Jayden Laverde
- Born: 12 April 1996 (age 30)
- Original team: Western Jets (TAC Cup)
- Draft: No. 20, 2014 national draft
- Height: 193 cm (6 ft 4 in)
- Weight: 94 kg (207 lb)
- Position: Key Defender

Club information
- Current club: Greater Western Sydney
- Number: 25

Playing career^{1}
Years	Club	Games (Goals)
2015–2025	Essendon	145 (38)
2026–	Greater Western Sydney	19 (0)
Total		162 (38)
- ^{1} Playing statistics correct to the end of round 22, 2026.

Jayden Laverde (/ləˈvɜːrdiː/ lə-VUR-dee; born 12 April 1996) is a professional Australian rules footballer who currently plays for Greater Western Sydney in the Australian Football League (AFL), having previous played eleven seasons for the Essendon Football Club. He was recruited with the 20th overall selection in the 2014 national draft.

== Early life ==
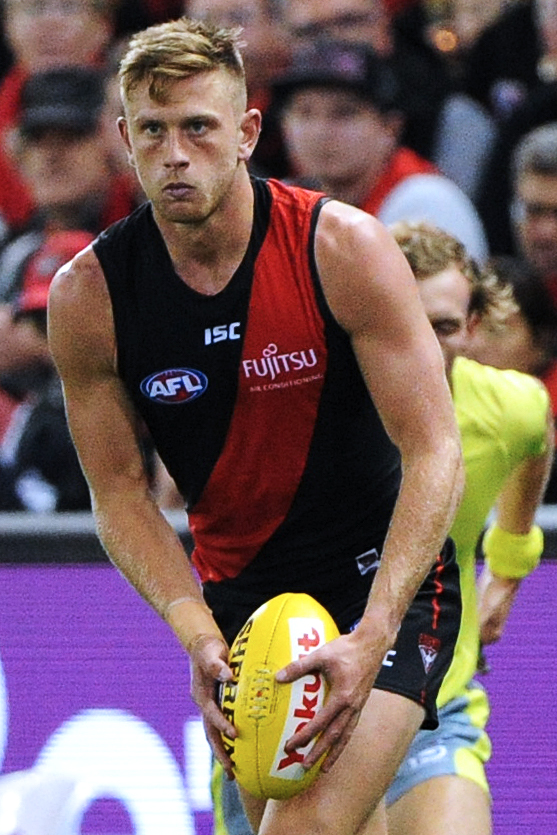
Laverde playing for Essendon in 2018

Laverde played as a junior at Keilor Football Club and played for the Western Jets in the TAC Cup. He was named All-Australian in the AFL Under 18 Championships, playing for Vic Metro.

== AFL career ==
Laverde was drafted by Essendon with pick 20 in the 2014 national draft. He made his AFL debut against Melbourne in round 15 of the 2015 AFL season. In his first season, he played nine games and kicked five goals. In 2016 he suffered an ankle injury and was sidelined for eight weeks.

Originally starting his career as a forward, in the 2021 AFL season his career was reinvigorated with a move to defence.

Laverde played 145 games for Essendon over 11 seasons, before he was delisted at the end of the 2025 AFL season.

Laverde joined Greater Western Sydney on the first day of the 2025/26 Supplemental Selection Period.

== Statistics ==
Updated to the end of round 22, 2026.

Legend
G	Goals	K	Kicks	D	Disposals	T	Tackles
B	Behinds	H	Handballs	M	Marks

Season	Team	No.	Games	Totals							Averages (per game)							Votes
Season	Team	No.	Games	G	B	K	H	D	M	T	G	B	K	H	D	M	T	Votes
2015	Essendon	33	9	5	1	49	68	117	32	34	0.6	0.1	5.4	7.6	13.0	3.6	3.8	0
2016	Essendon	33	9	8	9	64	41	105	43	26	0.9	1.0	7.1	4.6	11.7	4.8	2.9	0
2017	Essendon	33	5	1	5	26	30	56	16	14	0.2	1.0	5.2	6.0	11.2	3.2	2.8	0
2018	Essendon	33	7	5	6	54	37	91	27	18	0.7	0.9	7.7	5.3	13.0	3.9	2.6	0
2019	Essendon	15	10	11	13	66	48	114	39	21	1.1	1.3	6.6	4.8	11.4	3.9	2.1	0
2020 (Note: The 2020 season was played with 17 home-and-away matches per team (down from 22) and 16-minute quarters with time on (down from 20-minute quarters with time on) due to the impact of the COVID-19 pandemic.)	Essendon	15	6	6	3	30	16	46	20	15	1.0	0.5	5.0	2.7	7.7	3.3	2.5	0
2021	Essendon	15	23	1	0	202	116	318	134	35	0.0	0.0	8.8	5.0	13.8	5.8	1.5	0
2022	Essendon	15	22	0	1	190	123	313	137	45	0.0	0.0	8.6	5.6	14.2	6.2	2.0	0
2023	Essendon	15	19	1	0	186	115	301	124	37	0.1	0.0	9.8	6.1	15.8	6.5	1.9	0
2024	Essendon	15	21	0	0	194	139	333	127	33	0.0	0.0	9.2	6.6	15.9	6.0	1.6	0
2025	Essendon	15	14	0	0	139	77	216	97	25	0.0	0.0	9.9	5.5	15.4	6.9	1.8	0
2026	Greater Western Sydney	25	19	0	1	151	119	270	106	40	0.0	0.1	7.9	6.3	14.2	5.6	2.1	0
Career			164	38	39	1351	929	2280	902	343	0.2	0.2	8.2	5.7	13.9	5.5	2.1	0
