= Wade Derksen =

Australian rules footballer (born 2001)

Personal information
- Full name: Wade Derksen
- Born: 18 June 2001 (age 25)
- Original teams: Nightcliff (NTFL); Queanbeyan (AFL Canberra); Essendon (VFL); Sunbury (BFL); Peel Thunder (WAFL)
- Draft: No. 5, 2022 mid-season rookie draft
- Debut: Round 4, 2026, Carlton vs. North Melbourne, at Docklands Stadium
- Height: 195 cm (6 ft 5 in)
- Position: Key Defender

Club information
- Current club: Carlton
- Number: 47

Playing career^{1}
Years	Club	Games (Goals)
2022–2025	Greater Western Sydney	0 (0)
2026–	Carlton	15 (0)
Total		15 (0)
- ^{1} Playing statistics correct to the end of the 2026 season.

Wade Derksen (born 18 June 2001) is a professional Australian rules footballer who plays for the Carlton Football Club in the Australian Football League (AFL), having previously been listed with the GWS Giants.

== Pre-AFL career ==
Hailing from Darwin, Derksen played for the Nightcliff Tigers in the Northern Territory Football League. He also played for the Queanbeyan Football Club in the AFL Canberra competition in 2018 and 2019.

In 2021, Derksen, having moved to Victoria, joined Essendon in the VFL, also playing for the Sunbury Lions in the Ballarat Football League. In 2022, Derksen made the move to Western Australia, where he signed with Peel Thunder in the WAFL.

== AFL career ==
=== Greater Western Sydney ===
Derksen was selected with pick 5 of the 2022 mid-season rookie draft by the GWS Giants. Following the 2024 AFL season, the untried Derksen requested a trade to a Victorian AFL team. The trade request was unsuccessful, with the Giants preferring to hold Derksen to his contract. After spending four seasons with the Giants without playing an AFL game, Derksen was delisted at the end of the 2025 AFL season. He returned to the Northern Territory to play with Nightcliff.

=== Carlton ===
During the 2026 pre-season, Derksen was invited to train with the Carlton Football Club for an AFL list spot. He drove for four days from Darwin to Melbourne in an attempt to return to an AFL list. He was eventually added to Carlton's list on 23 February, via the 2026 pre-season supplemental selection period. He was named to make his AFL debut in round 4 of the 2026 AFL season against North Melbourne. He performed well on debut, collecting eleven disposals and five intercept possessions in the loss. In July 2026, Derksen signed a two-year contract extension with Carlton to the end of 2028.

== Statistics ==
Updated to the end of the 2026 season.

Legend
G	Goals	K	Kicks	D	Disposals	T	Tackles
B	Behinds	H	Handballs	M	Marks

Season	Team	No.	Games	Totals							Averages (per game)							Votes
Season	Team	No.	Games	G	B	K	H	D	M	T	G	B	K	H	D	M	T	Votes
2022	Greater Western Sydney	45	0	—	—	—	—	—	—	—	—	—	—	—	—	—	—	0
2023	Greater Western Sydney	45	0	—	—	—	—	—	—	—	—	—	—	—	—	—	—	0
2024	Greater Western Sydney	45	0	—	—	—	—	—	—	—	—	—	—	—	—	—	—	0
2025	Greater Western Sydney	45	0	—	—	—	—	—	—	—	—	—	—	—	—	—	—	0
2026	Carlton	47	15	0	0	134	66	200	80	12	0.0	0.0	8.9	4.4	13.3	5.3	0.8	0
Career			15	0	0	134	66	200	80	12	0.0	0.0	8.9	4.4	13.3	5.3	0.8	0
