= Will Lewis (Australian footballer) =

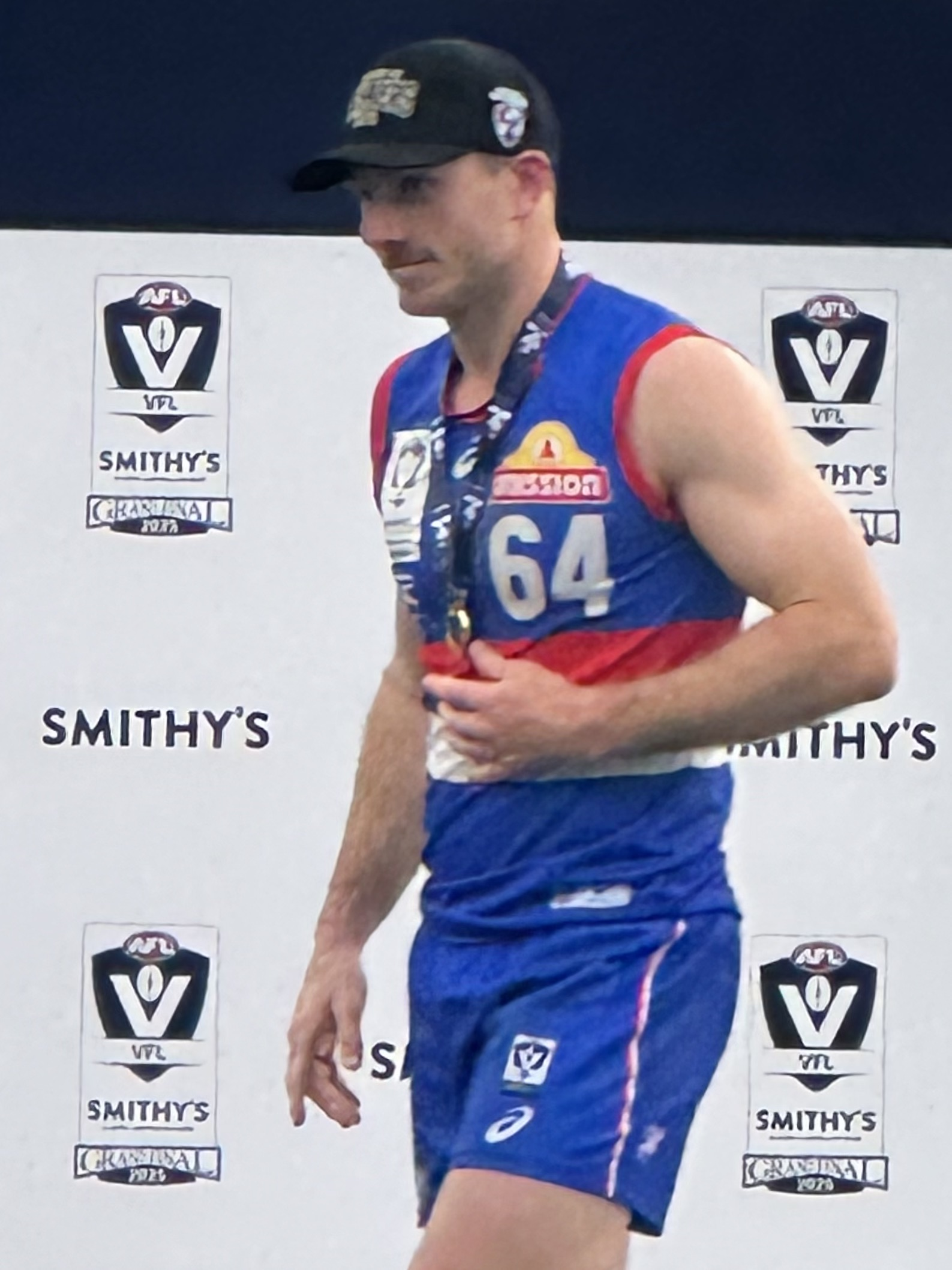
- Lewis in September 2025

Personal information
- Born: 5 May 1999 (age 27)
- Original teams: Old Brighton (VAFA); Footscray (VFL)
- Draft: 2026 pre-season supplemental selection period signing
- Debut: Round 1, 2026, Western Bulldogs vs. Greater Western Sydney, at Docklands Stadium
- Height: 195 cm (6 ft 5 in)
- Position: Key Forward

Club information
- Current club: Western Bulldogs
- Number: 28

Playing career^{1}
| Years | Club | Games (Goals) |
| 2026– | Western Bulldogs | 13 (15) |
- ^{1} Playing statistics correct to the end of the 2026 season.

Will Lewis (born 5 May 1999) is a professional Australian rules footballer who plays for the Western Bulldogs in the Australian Football League (AFL).

== Pre-AFL career ==
Lewis played for Old Brighton in the VAFA, also playing for Footscray in the VFL. In 2025, Lewis kicked 40 goals from 19 games in the VFL, including two goals in their Grand Final win over Southport. The same year, Lewis played for Old Brighton in their premiership, kicking four goals to win the Jock Nelson Medal as best on ground.

== AFL career ==
Lewis was selected by the Western Bulldogs through the 2026 pre-season supplemental selection period. He made his debut in round 1 of the 2026 AFL season.

== Statistics ==
Updated to the end of the 2026 season.

Legend
| G | Goals | K | Kicks | D | Disposals | T | Tackles |
| B | Behinds | H | Handballs | M | Marks |

| Season | Team | No. | Games | Totals | | | | | | | Averages (per game) | | | | | | | Votes |
| Season | Team | No. | Games | G | B | K | H | D | M | T | G | B | K | H | D | M | T | Votes |
|---|---|---|---|---|---|---|---|---|---|---|---|---|---|---|---|---|---|---|
| 2026 | Western Bulldogs | 28 | 13 | 15 | 9 | 68 | 44 | 112 | 30 | 26 | 1.2 | 0.7 | 5.2 | 3.4 | 8.6 | 2.3 | 2.0 | 0 |
| Career | | | 13 | 15 | 9 | 68 | 44 | 112 | 30 | 26 | 1.2 | 0.7 | 5.2 | 3.4 | 8.6 | 2.3 | 2.0 | 0 |
