= Louis Emmett =

Australian rules footballer (born 2007)

Personal information
- Born: 23 March 2007 (age 19)
- Original team: Glen Iris JFC
- Draft: No. 27, 2025 national draft
- Height: 200 cm (6 ft 7 in)
- Position: Ruckman

Club information
- Current club: Western Bulldogs
- Number: 25

Playing career
Years	Club	Games (Goals)
2026–	Western Bulldogs	7 (0)

Louis Emmett (born 23 March 2007) is an Australian rules footballer who plays for the Western Bulldogs in the Australian Football League (AFL).

Emmett attended Scotch College, Melbourne, and started out with the Glen Iris JFC.

A mobile ruckman, Emmett played for the Oakleigh Chargers in the Talent League, represented Vic Metro, and registered the third best time (6.07) for the 2 km time trial at the AFL Draft Combine.

Emmett was selected by the Western Bulldogs with pick 27 in the 2025 national draft. After a strong start playing in the VFL, which included a 23-disposal and eight mark game in round three, Emmett made his AFL debut against Hawthorn during Gather Round as a replacement for an injured Tim English. He finished his maiden AFL season with seven appearances.
