= 2023 Essendon Football Club season =

Essendon Football Club season

The 2023 Essendon Football Club season was the club's 125th season playing in the Australian Football League (AFL). The club also fielded an AFLW side that competed in the AFLW's 8th Season. Essendon also fielded reserve teams for the AFL and AFLW in the Victorian Football League (VFL) and the VFLW. This was the club's 14th season in the VFL.

== AFL ==
Essendon Football Club
2023 AFL season
- President: Dave Barham
- Coach: Brad Scott (1st season)
- Captains: Zach Merrett (1st season)
- Home ground: MCG, Marvel Stadium
- Practice Match: Won by 5, Lost by 35
- Home & Away: 11 wins, 12 losses, 0 draws (11th)
- Finals: DNQ
- Best and Fairest: Zach Merrett
- Leading goalkicker: Kyle Langford (51)
- Highest home attendance: 78,300 vs. Richmond (Round 10)
- Lowest home attendance: 28,815 vs. Greater Western Sydney (Round 4)
- Average home attendance: 46,690
- Club membership: 86,274

=== Season summary ===
It was Essendon's first season coached by Brad Scott who was replacing Ben Rutten who was sacked during the 2022 season. Zach Merrett captained his first season after Dyson Heppell stepped down during the off-season before the 2023 season.

Essendon started the season winning four of their first five games only losing to St Kilda in round 3. The bombers then lost their next four games including a five-goal comeback against Collingwood on Anzac day.

Essendon win the four games just before the bye to put them at 6th place with 8 wins and 5 losses.

The bombers looked like they would make their first finals series since 2021, sitting fifth after their round 17 win against Adelaide. In the last seven rounds the average margin was -44. Essendon lost by margins of 77, 126 and 70 against teams that earlier in the year they either beat or didn't lose to by much. The bombers only won by nine points against North Melbourne and also by one point against West Coast. Essendon's 126 point loss against GWS knocked them out of the finals race.

=== Pre Season ===
Essendon defeated Gold Coast by five points in an unofficial match simulation at Austworld Centre Oval. The final score was Gold Coast 11.9 (75) versus Essendon 11.14 (80). The bombers also played an official AFL practice match against St Kilda, and were defeated by 35 points. The final score was St Kilda 10.7 (67) against Essendon 3.14 (32). Essendon's first game in the home & away season was against Hawthorn at the MCG.

=== Coaching staff ===
Brad Scott coached his first season for the bombers after a three-year break from coaching after stepping down from as senior coach of North Melbourne in 2019. Scott would make his coaching record 117-117 after the bombers loss against Collingwood.

2023 Essendon coaching staff
| Role | Name |
|---|---|
| Senior Coach | Brad Scott |
| Assistant Coach (backline) | Blake Caracella |
| Assistant Coach (midfield) | Daniel Giansiracusa |
| Assistant Coach (forward) | Dale Tapping |
| Assistant Midfield Coach | Ben Jacobs |
| Head of Development | Cam Roberts |
| Development Coach | Brent Stanton |
| Development Coach | Michael Hurley |
| Specialist Coach | Travis Cloke |

=== Playing List ===
==== Changes ====
Deletions from playing list
| Player | Reason | Ref. |
|---|---|---|
| Cody Brand | Delisted | |
| Tom Cutler | Delisted | |
| Josh Eyre | Delisted | |
| Aaron Francis | Trade to Sydney | |
| Brayden Ham | Delisted | |
| Tom Hird | Delisted | |
| Michael Hurley | Retired | |
| Garrett McDonagh | Delisted | |
| Devon Smith | Retired | |
| Alec Waterman | Delisted | |

Additions to playing list
| Player | Acquired | Ref. |
|---|---|---|
| Alwyn Davey Jnr | No 45, 2022 national draft, father-son | |
| Jayden Davey | No 54, 2022 national draft, father-son | |
| Lewis Hayes | No 25, 2022 national draft | |
| Rhett Montgomerie | No 4, 2023 rookie draft | |
| Anthony Munkara | Category B rookie | |
| Will Setterfield | Trade from Carlton | |
| Elijah Tsatas | No 5, 2022 national draft | |
| Sam Weideman | Trade from Melbourne | |

==== Statistics ====
Updated to the end of the 2023 season

Essendon 2023 AFL Playing list and statistics
| Player | No. | Games | Goals | Behinds | Kicks | Handballs | Disposals | Tackles | Marks | Hitouts | Milestone(s) |
|---|---|---|---|---|---|---|---|---|---|---|---|
| Andrew McGrath | 1 | 23 | 0 | 1 | 289 | 235 | 524 | 47 | 120 | 0 | |
| Sam Draper | 2 | 14 | 10 | 12 | 101 | 53 | 154 | 28 | 37 | 282 | |
| Darcy Parish | 3 | 18 | 3 | 6 | 271 | 284 | 555 | 77 | 78 | 0 | 150 Games (round 24) |
| Kyle Langford | 4 | 23 | 51 | 23 | 218 | 96 | 314 | 36 | 130 | 0 | |
| Elijah Tsatas | 5 | 4 | 1 | 2 | 35 | 30 | 65 | 11 | 15 | 0 | AFL Debut (round 21) |
| Jye Caldwell | 6 | 21 | 11 | 12 | 183 | 208 | 391 | 89 | 71 | 0 | |
| Zach Merrett | 7 | 22 | 8 | 10 | 336 | 298 | 634 | 121 | 112 | 0 | |
| Ben Hobbs | 8 | 18 | 6 | 4 | 195 | 159 | 354 | 73 | 72 | 0 | |
| Dylan Shiel | 9 | 12 | 6 | 1 | 105 | 119 | 224 | 38 | 32 | 0 | |
| Sam Weideman | 10 | 16 | 15 | 15 | 86 | 59 | 145 | 18 | 65 | 13 | Club Debut (round 1) |
| Will Snelling | 11 | 15 | 6 | 3 | 89 | 82 | 171 | 47 | 44 | 0 | |
| Will Setterfield | 12 | 10 | 2 | 3 | 112 | 96 | 208 | 60 | 47 | 0 | Club Debut (Round 1) |
| Nik Cox | 13 | 6 | 0 | 3 | 32 | 39 | 71 | 13 | 18 | 0 | |
| Jordan Ridley | 14 | 17 | 1 | 1 | 259 | 86 | 345 | 15 | 126 | 0 | |
| Jayden Laverde | 15 | 19 | 1 | 0 | 186 | 115 | 301 | 37 | 124 | 0 | 100 Games (round 13) |
| Archie Perkins | 16 | 23 | 18 | 13 | 219 | 132 | 351 | 65 | 95 | 0 | |
| James Stewart | 17 | 0 | 0 | 0 | 0 | 0 | 0 | 0 | 0 | 0 | |
| Lewis Hayes | 18 | 0 | 0 | 0 | 0 | 0 | 0 | 0 | 0 | 0 | |
| Nick Hind | 19 | 16 | 3 | 1 | 220 | 71 | 291 | 24 | 68 | 0 | |
| Peter Wright | 20 | 10 | 19 | 10 | 64 | 32 | 96 | 13 | 44 | 25 | |
| Dyson Heppell | 21 | 22 | 1 | 0 | 253 | 190 | 443 | 50 | 156 | 0 | |
| Sam Durham | 22 | 22 | 5 | 2 | 178 | 185 | 363 | 47 | 107 | 0 | |
| Harry Jones | 23 | 5 | 2 | 4 | 29 | 16 | 45 | 4 | 21 | 0 | |
| Nick Bryan | 24 | 8 | 1 | 2 | 43 | 29 | 72 | 11 | 20 | 141 | |
| Jake Stringer | 25 | 17 | 21 | 23 | 145 | 83 | 228 | 51 | 45 | 0 | |
| Kaine Baldwin | 26 | 4 | 0 | 0 | 26 | 9 | 35 | 4 | 19 | 0 | |
| Mason Redman | 27 | 23 | 7 | 5 | 380 | 124 | 504 | 43 | 138 | 0 | 100 Games (round 21) |
| Alastair Lord | 28 | 0 | 0 | 0 | 0 | 0 | 0 | 0 | 0 | 0 | |
| Jake Kelly | 29 | 17 | 1 | 0 | 136 | 108 | 244 | 28 | 91 | 0 | |
| Brandon Zerk-Thatcher | 30 | 22 | 0 | 0 | 164 | 103 | 267 | 33 | 120 | 0 | |
| Zach Reid | 31 | 0 | 0 | 0 | 0 | 0 | 0 | 0 | 0 | 0 | |
| Alwyn Davey Jnr | 33 | 10 | 4 | 2 | 41 | 34 | 75 | 20 | 20 | 0 | AFL Debut (round 2) |
| Andrew Phillips | 34 | 20 | 5 | 7 | 90 | 62 | 152 | 48 | 46 | 414 | |
| Matt Guelfi | 35 | 13 | 14 | 4 | 68 | 70 | 138 | 37 | 30 | 0 | |
| Jayden Davey | 36 | 0 | 0 | 0 | 0 | 0 | 0 | 0 | 0 | 0 | |
| Nic Martin | 37 | 23 | 17 | 4 | 290 | 216 | 506 | 50 | 124 | 0 | |
| Rhett Montogomerie | 38 | 0 | 0 | 0 | 0 | 0 | 0 | 0 | 0 | 0 | |
| Patrick Voss | 39 | 0 | 0 | 0 | 0 | 0 | 0 | 0 | 0 | 0 | |
| Tex Wanganeen | 40 | 0 | 0 | 0 | 0 | 0 | 0 | 0 | 0 | 0 | |
| Cian McBride | 41 | 0 | 0 | 0 | 0 | 0 | 0 | 0 | 0 | 0 | |
| Massimo D'Ambrosio | 42 | 8 | 1 | 1 | 56 | 31 | 87 | 10 | 24 | 0 | |
| Anthony McDonald-Tipungwuti | 43 | 7 | 4 | 5 | 27 | 23 | 50 | 15 | 15 | 0 | |
| Anthony Munkara | 45 | 0 | 0 | 0 | 0 | 0 | 0 | 0 | 0 | 0 | |
| Jye Menzie | 46 | 21 | 23 | 11 | 100 | 82 | 182 | 48 | 47 | 0 | |
| Jaiden Hunter | 49 | 0 | 0 | 0 | 0 | 0 | 0 | 0 | 0 | 0 | |

=== Results ===
Keys
| H | Home game |
| A | Away game |
| N | Neutral venue game |

Table of 2023 AFL season results
| Round | Date | Result | Score | | | Opponent | Score | | | Ground | | Attendance | Ladder |
| Round | Date | Result | G | B | T | Opponent | G | B | T | Ground | | Attendance | Ladder |
|---|---|---|---|---|---|---|---|---|---|---|---|---|---|
| 1 | 19 March | Won | 19 | 10 | 124 | Hawthorn | 9 | 11 | 65 | Melbourne Cricket Ground | A | 68,691 | 1st |
| 2 | 26 March | Won | 16 | 12 | 108 | Gold Coast | 11 | 14 | 80 | Marvel Stadium | H | 32,915 | 3rd |
| 3 | 1 April | Lost | 11 | 8 | 74 | St Kilda | 14 | 8 | 92 | Melbourne Cricket Ground | A | 69,255 | 6th |
| 4 | 9 April | Won | 11 | 22 | 88 | Greater Western Sydney | 11 | 9 | 75 | Marvel Stadium | H | 28,815 | 4th |
| 5 | 15 April | Won | 15 | 14 | 104 | Melbourne | 11 | 11 | 77 | Adelaide Oval | N | 33,832 | 2nd |
| 6 | 25 April | Lost | 11 | 11 | 77 | Collingwood | 13 | 12 | 90 | Melbourne Cricket Ground | A | 95,179 | 4th |
| 7 | 30 April | Lost | 16 | 8 | 104 | Geelong | 20 | 12 | 132 | Melbourne Cricket Ground | H | 67,457 | 9th |
| 8 | 7 May | Lost | 13 | 9 | 87 | Port Adelaide | 12 | 20 | 92 | Adelaide Oval | A | 36,247 | 9th |
| 9 | 13 May | Lost | 6 | 9 | 45 | Brisbane Lions | 12 | 15 | 87 | The Gabba | A | 31,898 | 10th |
| 10 | 20 May | Won | 10 | 11 | 71 | Richmond | 10 | 10 | 70 | Melbourne Cricket Ground | H | 78,300 | 9th |
| 11 | 27 May | Won | 14 | 12 | 96 | West Coast | 6 | 10 | 46 | Optus Stadium | A | 39,269 | 8th |
| 12 | 4 June | Won | 16 | 9 | 105 | North Melbourne | 15 | 9 | 99 | Marvel Stadium | H | 40,488 | 6th |
| 13 | 11 June | Won | 13 | 8 | 86 | Carlton | 6 | 16 | 52 | Melbourne Cricket Ground | A | 83,638 | 6th |
| 14 | Bye | | | | | | | | | | | | 6th |
| 15 | 24 June | Lost | 9 | 7 | 61 | Fremantle | 14 | 9 | 93 | Optus Stadium | A | 43,063 | 6th |
| 16 | 1 July | Lost | 10 | 14 | 74 | Port Adelaide | 11 | 12 | 78 | Melbourne Cricket Ground | H | 38,957 | 8th |
| 17 | 9 July | Won | 17 | 13 | 115 | Adelaide | 15 | 7 | 97 | Marvel Stadium | H | 39,606 | 5th |
| 18 | 15 July | Lost | 7 | 3 | 45 | Geelong | 18 | 14 | 122 | GMHBA Stadium | A | 23,185 | 8th |
| 19 | 21 July | Lost | 7 | 7 | 49 | Western Bulldogs | 13 | 12 | 90 | Marvel Stadium | H | 43,634 | 11th |
| 20 | 29 July | Lost | 15 | 9 | 99 | Sydney | 15 | 11 | 101 | Marvel Stadium | H | 38,329 | 13th |
| 21 | 5 August | Won | 10 | 13 | 73 | West Coast | 11 | 6 | 72 | Marvel Stadium | H | 30,742 | 12th |
| 22 | 12 August | Won | 13 | 8 | 86 | North Melbourne | 12 | 5 | 77 | Marvel Stadium | A | 37,231 | 9th |
| 23 | 19 August | Lost | 5 | 6 | 36 | Greater Western Sydney | 25 | 12 | 162 | GIANTS Stadium | A | 10,281 | 10th |
| 24 | 25 August | Lost | 3 | 13 | 31 | Collingwood | 16 | 5 | 101 | Melbourne Cricket Ground | H | 74,344 | 11th |

=== Ladder ===
| Pos | Team | Pld | W | L | D | PF | PA | PP | Pts | Qualification |
|---|---|---|---|---|---|---|---|---|---|---|
| 1 | Collingwood (P) | 23 | 18 | 5 | 0 | 2142 | 1687 | 127.0 | 72 | Finals series |
| 2 | Brisbane Lions | 23 | 17 | 6 | 0 | 2180 | 1771 | 123.1 | 68 | Finals series |
| 3 | Port Adelaide | 23 | 17 | 6 | 0 | 2149 | 1906 | 112.7 | 68 | Finals series |
| 4 | Melbourne | 23 | 16 | 7 | 0 | 2079 | 1660 | 125.2 | 64 | Finals series |
| 5 | Carlton | 23 | 13 | 9 | 1 | 1922 | 1697 | 113.3 | 54 | Finals series |
| 6 | St Kilda | 23 | 13 | 10 | 0 | 1775 | 1647 | 107.8 | 52 | Finals series |
| 7 | Greater Western Sydney | 23 | 13 | 10 | 0 | 2018 | 1885 | 107.1 | 52 | Finals series |
| 8 | Sydney | 23 | 12 | 10 | 1 | 2050 | 1863 | 110.0 | 50 | Finals series |
| 9 | Western Bulldogs | 23 | 12 | 11 | 0 | 1919 | 1766 | 108.7 | 48 | |
| 10 | Adelaide | 23 | 11 | 12 | 0 | 2193 | 1877 | 116.8 | 44 | |
| 11 | Essendon | 23 | 11 | 12 | 0 | 1838 | 2050 | 89.7 | 44 | |
| 12 | Geelong | 23 | 10 | 12 | 1 | 2088 | 1855 | 112.6 | 42 | |
| 13 | Richmond | 23 | 10 | 12 | 1 | 1856 | 1983 | 93.6 | 42 | |
| 14 | Fremantle | 23 | 10 | 13 | 0 | 1835 | 1898 | 96.7 | 40 | |
| 15 | Gold Coast | 23 | 9 | 14 | 0 | 1839 | 2006 | 91.7 | 36 | |
| 16 | Hawthorn | 23 | 7 | 16 | 0 | 1686 | 2101 | 80.2 | 28 | |
| 17 | North Melbourne | 23 | 3 | 20 | 0 | 1657 | 2318 | 71.5 | 12 | |
| 18 | West Coast | 23 | 3 | 20 | 0 | 1418 | 2674 | 53.0 | 12 | |

Source: afl.com.au
Rules for classification: 1) points; 2) percentage; 3) number of points for
(P) Premiers

=== Awards ===
==== Club Awards ====
- Crichton Medal: Zach Merrett
- Bruce Heymanson Best Clubman: Andrew McGrath
- Adam Ramanauskas Most Courageous Player: Mason Redman
- Matthew Lloyd Leading Goalkicker: Kyle Langford
- John Kilby Staff and Trainers Award: Andrew McGrath
- Most-improved Player: Kyle Langford
- Lindsay Griffiths Rising Star: Alwyn Davey Jnr
- McCracken Medal: Zach Merrett & Kyle Langford
- Louis Rowe Seniors Medal: Scott Van Gemert
- Clifford Denise Wise Community Medal: Ben Milton

==== League Awards ====
- All-Australian: Zach Merrett

== VFL ==
=== Season summary ===
Essendon Football Club
2023 VFL season
- President: Dave Barham
- Coach: Leigh Tudor (2nd season)
- Captains: Billy Cootee (1st season)
- Home ground: The NEC Hangar, Windy Hill
- Home & Away: 5 wins, 13 losses, 0 draws (17th)
- Finals: DNQ
- Leading goalkicker: Patrick Voss (30)

Leigh Tudor returned as the senior VFL coach of Essendon before the start of the 2023 VFL season, after a one-year break. Tudor was previously the coach of the VFL bombers in 2021. This was Billy Cootee's first season as captain of the VFL bombers in 2023.

The bombers had a good start to the season, winning two of their first three games. Essendon then lost their next nine games. The bombers responded to losing nine games in a row by knocking off first place, Gold Coast, giving the suns their second loss of the season. The bombers then beat Geelong after their third bye. The bombers lost their next three games after that, then beating Coburg in the last round.

=== Squad ===
Essendon 2023 VFL Playing List
| Player | No. | Pos. |
|---|---|---|
| Brad Lynch | 50 | Utility |
| Will Hoare | 51 | Key Position/Ruck |
| Carlos Egan | 52 | Small Forward |
| Sam Conforti | 53 | Small Defender/Wing |
| Toby Murray | 54 | Key Forward/Ruck |
| Tom Phillips | 55 | Wing |
| Will Golds | 56 | Wing |
| Billy Cootee | 57 | Midfielder/Forward |
| Stefan Rasinac | 58 | Midfielder/Defender |
| Brad Bernacki | 59 | Midfielder |
| Jack Cleaver | 60 | Defender |
| Jacob Brown | 61 | Defender/Midfielder |
| Bruno Laguda | 62 | Utility |
| Jack Brown | 63 | Midfielder/Small Forward |
| Josh Hotchkin | 64 | Ruck |
| Oscar Duncan | 65 | Key Position |
| Will Madden | 66 | Key Defender |
| Tom Wallis | 68 | Utility |
| Jake Sutton | 69 | Forward/Wing |
| Riley Loton | 70 | Midfielder/Forward |
| Austin Harris | 71 | Small Forward |
| Maclayn Hallows | 72 | Forward |
| Matthew Foley | 73 | Small Defender |
| Declan Willmore | 74 | Midfielder |
| Jake Moorhead | 75 | Midfielder |
| Harry Minton-Connell | 76 | Small Defender |
| Joel Fitzgerald | 77 | Defender/Midfielder |
| Michael Kiraly | 78 | Utility |
| Callum McCarty | 79 | Midfielder/Forward |
| Solomon McKay | 80 | Half Forward/Wing |
| Beau O'Connell | 81 | Midfielder/Wing |

=== Results ===
Key
| H | Home game |
| A | Away game |

Table of 2023 VFL season results
| Round | Date | Result | Score | | | Opponent | Score | | | Ground | | Ladder |
| Round | Date | Result | G | B | T | Opponent | G | B | T | Ground | | Ladder |
|---|---|---|---|---|---|---|---|---|---|---|---|---|
| 1 | 26 March | Won | 18 | 11 | 119 | Greater Western Sydney | 5 | 9 | 39 | The NEC Hangar | H | 2nd |
| 2 | 2 April | Lost | 14 | 5 | 89 | Sandringham | 19 | 12 | 126 | Trevor Barker Oval | A | 8th |
| 3 | 9 April | Won | 12 | 16 | 88 | Northern Bullants | 9 | 11 | 65 | North Port Oval | A | 8th |
| 4 | 16 April | Lost | 5 | 12 | 42 | Casey | 12 | 10 | 82 | The NEC Hangar | H | 7th |
| 5 | 23 April | Lost | 13 | 11 | 89 | Collingwood | 14 | 13 | 97 | Victoria Park | A | 12th |
| 6 | Bye | | | | | | | | | | | 14th |
| 7 | 7 May | Lost | 8 | 5 | 53 | Werribee | 10 | 11 | 71 | The NEC Hangar | H | 15th |
| 8 | 14 May | Lost | 6 | 5 | 41 | Brisbane | 16 | 13 | 109 | Springfield Central Stadium | A | 15th |
| 9 | 20 May | Lost | 12 | 10 | 82 | Richmond | 12 | 12 | 84 | Melbourne Cricket Ground | H | 16th |
| 10 | 28 May | Lost | 8 | 10 | 58 | Box Hill | 15 | 15 | 105 | The NEC Hangar | H | 17th |
| 11 | 4 June | Lost | 10 | 9 | 69 | North Melbourne | 12 | 8 | 80 | The NEC Hangar | H | 18th |
| 12 | 11 June | Lost | 10 | 8 | 68 | Carlton | 14 | 15 | 99 | Princes Park | A | 18th |
| 13 | Bye | | | | | | | | | | | 18th |
| 14 | 25 June | Lost | 5 | 8 | 38 | Port Melbourne | 13 | 13 | 91 | North Port Oval | A | 18th |
| 15 | 2 July | Won | 11 | 11 | 77 | Gold Coast | 12 | 4 | 76 | Windy Hill | H | 17th |
| 16 | Bye | | | | | | | | | | | 17th |
| 17 | 16 July | Won | 9 | 10 | 64 | Geelong | 7 | 12 | 54 | GMHBA Stadium | A | 16th |
| 18 | 21 July | Lost | 9 | 9 | 63 | Williamstown | 9 | 15 | 69 | Williamstown Cricket Ground | A | 16th |
| 19 | 30 July | Lost | 6 | 8 | 44 | Sydney | 19 | 12 | 126 | Windy Hill | H | 16th |
| 20 | 5 August | Lost | 12 | 7 | 79 | Southport | 12 | 15 | 87 | Fankhauser Reserve | A | 17th |
| 21 | Bye | | | | | | | | | | | 17th |
| 22 | 19 August | Won | 15 | 10 | 100 | Coburg | 12 | 13 | 85 | Williamstown Cricket Ground | H | 17th |

=== Ladder ===
| Pos | Team | Pld | W | L | D | PF | PA | PP | Pts |
|---|---|---|---|---|---|---|---|---|---|
| 15 | Port Melbourne | 18 | 6 | 12 | 0 | 1270 | 1512 | 84.0 | 24 |
| 16 | Sandringham | 18 | 5 | 12 | 1 | 1298 | 1482 | 87.6 | 22 |
| 17 | Essendon (R) | 18 | 5 | 13 | 0 | 1263 | 1545 | 81.7 | 20 |
| 18 | Sydney (R) | 18 | 4 | 14 | 0 | 1241 | 1651 | 75.2 | 16 |
| 19 | Frankston | 18 | 4 | 14 | 0 | 1112 | 1566 | 71.0 | 16 |

Source: afl.com.au
Rules for classification: 1) points; 2) percentage; 3) number of points for
(R) = Reserves

== AFLW ==
Essendon Football Club
2023 AFLW season
- President: Dave Barham
- Coach: Natalie Wood (2nd Season)
- Captains: Steph Cain & Bonnie Toogood (2nd Season) (2nd Season)
- Home ground: Windy Hill
- Home & Away: 6 wins, 4 losses, 0 draws (7th)
- Finals: Elimination Final
- Best & Fairest: Bonnie Toogood
- Leading goalkicker: Bonnie Toogood
- Highest home attendance: 6,678 vs. Geelong (Elimination Final)
- Lowest home attendance: 1,422 vs. Collingwood (Round 5)
- Average home attendance: 2,954

=== Season summary ===
Natalie Wood continued to coach Essendon's AFLW team in season 8. Steph Cain & Bonnie Toogood also continues to captain the bombers AFLW side in season 8.

The Bombers struggled to get consecutive wins throughout the season only getting consecutive wins twice during the season. Despite them not struggling to get consecutive wins they finished 7th place and played in an elimination final against Geelong which they couldn't win.

=== Pre Season ===
Essendon played their pre season match against West Coast. The bombers lost by nine points in a tight contest. The final score was West Coast 6.7 (43) to Essendon 5.4 (34) at Mineral Resources Park.

=== Coaching staff ===
Former Geelong VFLW coach Natalie Wood coached her second season for Essendon's AFLW. The bombers have five other AFLW coaches coaching with Natalie Wood.

2023 Essendon AFLW coaching staff
| Role | Name |
|---|---|
| Senior Coach | Natalie Wood |
| Assistant Coach (midfield) | Travis Cloke |
| Assistant Coach (forward) | Peta Searle |
| Assistant Coach (backline) | Natasha Hardy |
| Development Coach | Gavin Urquhart |
| Development Coach | Bernard Shepheard |

=== Playing List ===
==== Changes ====
Deletions from playing list
| Player | Reason | Ref. |
|---|---|---|
| Bella Ayre | Delisted | |
| Olivia Barton | Delisted | |
| Jordan Zanchetta | Delisted | |
| Eloise Ashley-Cooper | Delisted | |
| Caitlin Sargent | Delisted | |
| Jorja Borg | Delisted | |
| Megan Ryan | Delisted | |
| Frederica Frew | Delisted | |

Additions to playing list
| Player | Reason | Ref. |
|---|---|---|
| Brooke Brown | pre-list signings | |
| Kodie Jacques | trade from Richmond | |
| Brooke Walker | trade from Carlton | |
| Leah Cutting | free agent | |
| Georgia Clarke | free agent | |

==== Statistics ====
Updated to the end of the Season 8 (2023)

Essendon 2023 AFLW Playing List and Statistics
| Player | No. | Games | Goals | Behinds | Kicks | Handballs | Disposals | Marks | Tackles | Hitouts |
|---|---|---|---|---|---|---|---|---|---|---|
| Georgia Gee | 2 | 8 | 2 | 2 | 52 | 45 | 97 | 16 | 26 | 0 |
| Daria Bannister | 3 | 6 | 3 | 4 | 34 | 21 | 55 | 20 | 21 | 0 |
| Maddy Prespakis | 4 | 11 | 5 | 2 | 146 | 142 | 288 | 32 | 56 | 0 |
| Georgia Nanscawen | 5 | 11 | 1 | 1 | 111 | 95 | 206 | 16 | 89 | 0 |
| Danielle Marshall | 6 | 2 | 0 | 0 | 6 | 4 | 10 | 3 | 1 | 0 |
| Kodi Jacques | 7 | 10 | 1 | 3 | 47 | 31 | 78 | 11 | 24 | 0 |
| Bonnie Toogood | 8 | 11 | 16 | 9 | 153 | 57 | 210 | 72 | 57 | 4 |
| Brooke Walker | 9 | 11 | 0 | 0 | 47 | 65 | 112 | 13 | 74 | 0 |
| Jacqui Vogt | 10 | 8 | 4 | 0 | 62 | 35 | 97 | 10 | 39 | 0 |
| Alana Barba | 11 | 0 | 0 | 0 | 0 | 0 | 0 | 0 | 0 | 0 |
| Joanne Doonan | 12 | 2 | 1 | 0 | 6 | 8 | 14 | 2 | 6 | 0 |
| Lily-Rose Williamson | 13 | 0 | 0 | 0 | 0 | 0 | 0 | 0 | 0 | 0 |
| Ellyse Gamble | 14 | 11 | 1 | 0 | 62 | 31 | 93 | 21 | 14 | 0 |
| Matilda Dyke | 16 | 8 | 1 | 0 | 28 | 37 | 65 | 10 | 25 | 26 |
| Georgia Clarke | 17 | 11 | 0 | 0 | 52 | 35 | 87 | 16 | 30 | 0 |
| Leah Cutting | 18 | 1 | 0 | 0 | 4 | 1 | 5 | 0 | 6 | 6 |
| Mia Van Dyke | 19 | 6 | 0 | 0 | 29 | 3 | 32 | 11 | 5 | 0 |
| Stephanie Cain | 20 | 8 | 0 | 1 | 62 | 48 | 110 | 19 | 37 | 1 |
| Jessica Wuetschner | 21 | 8 | 2 | 2 | 26 | 26 | 52 | 13 | 12 | 0 |
| Amelia Radford | 22 | 11 | 4 | 2 | 88 | 42 | 130 | 23 | 23 | 0 |
| Renee Tierney | 23 | 2 | 1 | 1 | 11 | 3 | 14 | 5 | 1 | 0 |
| Sophie Alexander | 24 | 11 | 6 | 7 | 76 | 59 | 135 | 31 | 17 | 25 |
| Alexandra Morcom | 25 | 8 | 0 | 0 | 35 | 17 | 52 | 8 | 18 | 0 |
| Ashleigh Van Loon | 26 | 5 | 0 | 0 | 8 | 10 | 18 | 4 | 12 | 2 |
| Sophie Van De Heuval | 27 | 10 | 0 | 2 | 94 | 41 | 135 | 33 | 23 | 0 |
| Mia Busch | 28 | 11 | 0 | 0 | 49 | 24 | 73 | 15 | 44 | 0 |
| Stephanie Wales | 30 | 11 | 1 | 0 | 70 | 61 | 131 | 22 | 36 | 231 |
| Paige Scott | 32 | 11 | 1 | 0 | 58 | 55 | 113 | 24 | 58 | 0 |
| Amber Clarke | 33 | 10 | 3 | 3 | 66 | 17 | 83 | 19 | 17 | 0 |
| Catherine Phillips | 35 | 0 | 0 | 0 | 0 | 0 | 0 | 0 | 0 | 0 |
| Brooke Brown | 36 | 8 | 6 | 5 | 69 | 30 | 99 | 22 | 7 | 0 |

=== Results ===
Key
| H | Home game |
| A | Away game |

Table of 2023 AFLW season results
| Round | Date | Result | Score | | | Opponent | Score | | | Ground | | Attendance | Ladder |
| Round | Date | Result | G | B | T | Opponent | G | B | T | Ground | | Attendance | Ladder |
|---|---|---|---|---|---|---|---|---|---|---|---|---|---|
| 1 | 2 September | Won | 7 | 7 | 49 | Hawthorn | 4 | 6 | 30 | Kinetic Stadium | A | 3,778 | 5th |
| 2 | 10 September | Won | 6 | 4 | 40 | St Kilda | 4 | 4 | 28 | Windy Hill | H | 3,195 | 5th |
| 3 | 16 September | Lost | 5 | 4 | 34 | Adelaide | 12 | 9 | 81 | Wigan Oval | A | 2,238 | 10th |
| 4 | 24 September | Won | 7 | 8 | 50 | Fremantle | 4 | 6 | 30 | Windy Hill | H | 2,822 | 7th |
| 5 | 30 September | Lost | 3 | 6 | 24 | Collingwood | 6 | 8 | 44 | AIA Centre | A | 1,422 | 9th |
| 6 | 8 October | Won | 4 | 5 | 29 | Geelong | 2 | 7 | 19 | Reid Oval | H | 2,832 | 7th |
| 7 | 14 October | Won | 8 | | 53 | Richmond | 5 | 6 | 36 | IKON Park | A | 2,847 | 5th |
| 8 | 22 October | Lost | 2 | 7 | 19 | West Coast | 3 | 5 | 23 | Windy Hill | H | 2,108 | 5th |
| 9 | 28 October | Won | 8 | 8 | 56 | Carlton | 3 | 6 | 24 | Windy Hill | H | 3,812 | 5th |
| 10 | 3 November | Lost | 3 | 7 | 25 | Gold Coast | 6 | 3 | 39 | Great Barrier Reef Arena | A | 2,131 | 7th |

Table of 2023 AFLW finals results
| Round | Date | Result | Score | | | Opponent | Score | | | Ground | | Attendance |
| Round | Date | Result | G | B | T | Opponent | G | B | T | Ground | | Attendance |
|---|---|---|---|---|---|---|---|---|---|---|---|---|
| Elimination Final | 12 November | Lost | 5 | 3 | 33 | Geelong | 7 | 9 | 51 | GMHBA Stadium | A | 6,678 |

| Pos | Team | Pld | W | L | D | PF | PA | PP | Pts | Qualification |
|---|---|---|---|---|---|---|---|---|---|---|
| 1 | Adelaide | 10 | 9 | 1 | 0 | 599 | 314 | 190.8 | 36 | Finals series |
| 2 | Melbourne | 10 | 8 | 2 | 0 | 653 | 293 | 222.9 | 32 | Finals series |
| 3 | North Melbourne | 10 | 7 | 3 | 0 | 478 | 213 | 224.4 | 28 | Finals series |
| 4 | Brisbane (P) | 10 | 7 | 3 | 0 | 505 | 339 | 149.0 | 28 | Finals series |
| 5 | Gold Coast | 10 | 6 | 3 | 1 | 416 | 351 | 118.5 | 26 | Finals series |
| 6 | Geelong | 10 | 6 | 4 | 0 | 449 | 318 | 141.2 | 24 | Finals series |
| 7 | Essendon | 10 | 6 | 4 | 0 | 379 | 354 | 107.1 | 24 | Finals series |
| 8 | Sydney | 10 | 6 | 4 | 0 | 462 | 432 | 106.9 | 24 | Finals series |
| 9 | St Kilda | 10 | 6 | 4 | 0 | 408 | 399 | 102.3 | 24 | |
| 10 | Richmond | 10 | 5 | 5 | 0 | 382 | 379 | 100.8 | 20 | |
| 11 | Collingwood | 10 | 5 | 5 | 0 | 331 | 399 | 83.0 | 20 | |
| 12 | Carlton | 10 | 4 | 6 | 0 | 361 | 420 | 86.0 | 16 | |
| 13 | Fremantle | 10 | 4 | 6 | 0 | 289 | 402 | 71.9 | 16 | |
| 14 | Hawthorn | 10 | 3 | 7 | 0 | 307 | 456 | 67.3 | 12 | |
| 15 | Port Adelaide | 10 | 2 | 7 | 1 | 404 | 538 | 75.1 | 10 | |
| 16 | Greater Western Sydney | 10 | 2 | 8 | 0 | 316 | 596 | 53.0 | 8 | |
| 17 | West Coast | 10 | 2 | 8 | 0 | 269 | 530 | 50.8 | 8 | |
| 18 | Western Bulldogs | 10 | 1 | 9 | 0 | 320 | 595 | 53.8 | 4 | |

Source: afl.com.au
Rules for classification: 1) points; 2) percentage; 3) number of points for
(P) Premiers

== VFLW ==
Essendon Football Club
2023 VFLW season
- President: Dave Barham
- Coach: Travis Cloke (1st season)
- Captains: Georgia Nanscawen (2nd season)
- Home ground: The NEC Hangar
- Home & Away: 8 wins, 5 losses, 1 draw (5th)
- Finals: Preliminary Final
- Best and Fairest: Sophie Molan
- Leading goalkicker: Mia-Rae Clifford (14)

=== Season summary ===
Former Collingwood player Travis Cloke was appointed senior coach of Essendon's VFLW side in November 2022. Cloke coached with four other coaches. Georgia Nanscawen captained her second season for the bombers VFLW side. Courtney Ugle was the vice captain of Essendon's VFLW team. Kendra Heil, Mia-Rae Clifford and Eloise Ashley Cooper were all also part of Essendon's leadership group in 2023. Essendon were coming off a their first VFLW premiership in the season prior to the 2023 VFLW season.

The bombers started their sixth VFLW season with a draw against Box Hill. Essendon kicked four goals to Box Hill's three goals. The bombers then lost their next two games against the Southern Saints and Carlton. Essendon then won their next five games from rounds four to eight.

In the last round of the season Essendon needed a win to make the finals. The bombers defeated the Western Bulldogs in the last round to make the finals. The final score was 6.5 (41) to 4.4 (28).

In the first round of finals the bombers defeated Box Hill by 10 points. Their 10-point win against the hawks put them into the semi finals against Collingwood which they lost to by four points. The bombers loss to Collingwood put them into the Preliminary Final against Port Melbourne. Essendon lost by five goals against the Boroughs eliminating them from the 2023 VFLW season.

=== Coaching staff ===
Retired Collingwood and Western Bulldogs player Travis Cloke was appointed senior coach of the bombers VFLW team. Cloke coached with four other coaches including former AFLW player Kirby Bentley.

2023 VFLW coaching staff
| Role | Name |
|---|---|
| Senior Coach | Travis Cloke |
| Assistant Coach (midfield) | Brett Pollard |
| Assistant Coach (defensive) | Jacara Egan |
| Assistant Coach (forward) | Kirby Bentley |
| Development Coach | Jarrad Campbell |

=== Results ===
==== Home & Away ====
Key
| H | Home game |
| A | Away game |

Table of 2023 VFLW season results
| Round | Date | Results | Score | | | Opponent | Score | | | Ground | | Ladder |
| Round | Date | Results | G | B | T | Opponent | G | B | T | Ground | | Ladder |
|---|---|---|---|---|---|---|---|---|---|---|---|---|
| 1 | 26 March | Draw | 4 | 3 | 27 | Box Hill | 3 | 9 | 27 | The NEC Hangar | H | 7th |
| 2 | 2 April | Lost | 2 | 5 | 17 | Southern Saints | 6 | 6 | 42 | Trevor Barker Beach Oval | A | 9th |
| 3 | 8 April | Lost | 2 | 2 | 14 | Carlton | 10 | 8 | 68 | The NEC Hangar | H | 10th |
| 4 | 16 April | Won | 4 | 13 | 37 | Casey | 5 | 5 | 35 | The NEC Hangar | H | 9th |
| 5 | 22 April | Won | 4 | 7 | 31 | Collingwood | 2 | 3 | 15 | Victoria Park | A | 8th |
| 6 | 30 April | Won | 4 | 6 | 30 | Williamstown | 3 | 3 | 21 | DSV Stadium | A | 6th |
| 7 | 7 May | Won | 2 | 8 | 20 | Southern Saints | 1 | 2 | 8 | The NEC Hangar | H | 5th |
| 8 | 13 May | Won | 5 | 3 | 33 | Box Hill | 1 | 9 | 15 | Box Hill City Oval | A | 3rd |
| 9 | 20 May | Lost | 4 | 2 | 26 | Geelong Cats | 4 | 4 | 28 | The NEC Hangar | H | 5th |
| 10 | 28 May | Won | 6 | 6 | 42 | Darebin | 1 | 2 | 8 | La Trobe University | A | 4th |
| 11 | 4 June | Lost | 5 | 7 | 37 | North Melbourne | 6 | 9 | 45 | The NEC Hangar | H | 6th |
| 12 | 17 June | Won | 4 | 6 | 30 | Casey | 3 | 7 | 25 | Casey Fields | A | 4th |
| 13 | 25 June | Lost | 3 | 1 | 19 | Port Melbourne | 3 | 4 | 22 | ETU Stadium | A | 7th |
| 14 | 1 July | Won | 6 | 5 | 41 | Western Bulldogs | 4 | 4 | 28 | Windy Hill | H | 5th |
| Elimination Final | 8 July | Won | 4 | 7 | 31 | Box Hill | 3 | 3 | 21 | Box Hill City Oval | A | - |
| Semi Final | 15 July | Lost | 2 | 6 | 18 | Collingwood | 3 | 4 | 22 | Victoria Park | A | - |
| Preliminary Final | 23 July | Lost | 1 | 5 | 11 | Port Melbourne | 6 | 5 | 41 | ETU Stadium | H | - |

==== Ladder ====
| Pos | Team | Pld | W | L | D | PF | PA | PP | Pts | Qualification |
|---|---|---|---|---|---|---|---|---|---|---|
| 3 | Williamstown | 14 | 9 | 5 | 0 | 471 | 368 | 128.0 | 36 | Finals series |
| 4 | Box Hill | 14 | 8 | 4 | 2 | 444 | 358 | 124.0 | 36 | Finals series |
| 5 | Essendon | 14 | 8 | 5 | 1 | 404 | 387 | 104.4 | 34 | Finals series |
| 6 | Carlton | 14 | 8 | 6 | 0 | 526 | 349 | 150.7 | 32 | Finals series |
| 7 | Southern Saints | 14 | 8 | 6 | 0 | 365 | 334 | 109.3 | 32 | |

Source: AFL.com.au
Rules for classification: 1) points; 2) percentage; 3) number of points for.

==== Awards ====
- Best and Fairest: Sophie Molan
- Leading Goal Kicker: Mia Rae-Clifford (14 Goals)
