= 2016 North Melbourne Football Club season =

North Melbourne
2016 season
- President: James Brayshaw
- Coach: Brad Scott (7th season)
- Captains: Andrew Swallow (5th season)
- Home ground: Etihad Stadium (Capacity: 56,347)
- NAB Challenge: 13th
- AFL season: 8th (12-10)
- Finals: 8th (eliminated by Adelaide in Elimination Final)
- Syd Barker Medal: Robbie Tarrant
- Leading goalkicker: Ben Brown (41)
- Highest home attendance: 47,622 vs Western Bulldogs (Round 6)
- Lowest home attendance: 12,607 vs Melbourne (Round 3)
- Average home attendance: 28,171 (▲2,497)
- Club membership: 45,014 (▲4,002)

The 2016 AFL season was the 91st season in the Australian Football League (AFL) contested by the North Melbourne Football Club.

== Squad for 2016 ==
Statistics are correct as of end of 2015 season. Flags represent the state of origin, i.e. the state in which the player played his Under-18s football.

Senior List
No.	State	Player	Hgt (cm)	Wgt (kg)	Date of birth	Age (end 2015)	AFL Debut	Recruited from	Games (end 2015)	Goals (end 2015)
2	(South Australia)	Brad McKenzie	186	84	29 May 1993	22	2012	Sturt	23	5
3	(Northern Territory)	Jed Anderson	179	79	2 February 1994	21	2013	NT Thunder (U18), Hawthorn	10	4
4	(Victoria (state))	Shaun Higgins	184	89	4 March 1988	27	2006	Geelong (U18), Western Bulldogs	153	167
5	(Victoria (state))	Ben Jacobs	185	83	9 January 1992	23	2011	Sandringham (U18), Port Adelaide	70	9
6	(Victoria (state))	Lachlan Hansen	197	98	17 August 1988	27	2007	Gippsland (U18)	133	76
7	(Victoria (state))	Jack Ziebell (vc)	188	88	28 February 1991	24	2009	Murray (U18)	124	72
8	(Western Australia)	Daniel Wells	181	79	3 February 1985	30	2003	Peel	224	145
9	(Western Australia)	Andrew Swallow (c)	182	80	2 June 1987	28	2006	East Fremantle	186	76
10	(Victoria (state))	Ben Cunnington	185	88	30 June 1991	24	2010	Geelong (U18)	123	54
11	(Victoria (state))	Michael Firrito	189	93	27 November 1983	32	2003	Eastern (U18), Box Hill	253	29
12	(South Australia)	Lindsay Thomas	180	79	29 February 1988	27	2007	Port Adelaide (SANFL)	174	283
13	(Victoria (state))	Ryan Clarke	184	84	17 June 1997	18		Eastern (U18)
14	(South Australia)	Trent Dumont	186	85	30 June 1995	20	2015	Norwood	8	2
15	(Victoria (state))	Nick Dal Santo	185	85	22 February 1984	31	2002	Bendigo (U18), St Kilda	300	150
16	(Victoria (state))	Scott Thompson	193	96	9 May 1986	29	2008	Geelong (VFL)	160	6
17	(Victoria (state))	Aaron Mullett	184	79	23 February 1992	23	2011	Eastern (U18)	52	25
18	(Victoria (state))	Shaun Atley	189	86	13 September 1992	23	2011	Murray (U18)	109	15
19	(Victoria (state))	Sam Wright	188	85	15 July 1990	25	2009	Murray (U18)	108	56
20	(Victoria (state))	Drew Petrie	197	101	15 October 1982	33	2001	North Ballarat (U18)	293	401
21	(Victoria (state))	Luke McDonald	189	85	9 February 1995	20	2014	Oakleigh (U18)	37	1
22	(Victoria (state))	Todd Goldstein	201	103	1 July 1988	27	2008	Oakleigh (U18)	149	70
23	(Victoria (state))	Ben McKay	199	95	24 December 1997	18		Gippsland (U18)
24	(South Australia)	Sam Durdin	198	94	6 June 1996	19		West Adelaide
25	(Victoria (state))	Robbie Tarrant	196	97	25 April 1989	26	2010	Bendigo (U18)	61	41
26	(Victoria (state))	Daniel Nielson	194	96	9 May 1996	19		Eastern (U18)
27	(Victoria (state))	Taylor Garner	186	86	8 January 1994	21	2013	Dandenong (U18)	13	6
29	(Victoria (state))	Brent Harvey	177	75	14 May 1978	37	1996	Northern (U18)	409	482
30	(Victoria (state))	Jarrad Waite	194	96	4 February 1983	32	2003	Murray (U18)	207	294
32	(Victoria (state))	Mason Wood	192	84	13 September 1993	22	2014	Geelong (U18)	8	4
33	(Victoria (state))	Ed Vickers-Willis	190	86	28 March 1996	19		Sandringham (U18)
34	(Victoria (state))	Jamie Macmillan	188	88	23 September 1991	24	2010	Oakleigh (U18)	81	33
35	(Western Australia)	Aaron Black	192	192	29 November 1990	25	2011	Peel Thunder	50	64
36	(Queensland)	Joel Tippett	197	96	26 October 1988	27	2011	Southport, Brisbane Lions, Gold Coast	9	0
39	(Tasmania)	Mitchell Hibberd	190	85	23 September 1996	19		Clarence
40	(Victoria (state))	Kayne Turner	180	74	31 December 1995	20	2014	Murray (U18)	19	16
41	(Queensland)	Corey Wagner	180	74	23 March 1997	18		Aspley
42	(Western Australia)	Declan Mountford	181	72	13 February 1997	18		Claremont
43	(Victoria (state))	Sam Gibson	185	83	27 May 1986	29	2012	Box Hill, Oakleigh (U18)	85	33
50	(Tasmania)	Ben Brown	200	101	20 November 1992	23	2014	Devenport	33	50
Rookie List
No.	State	Player	Hgt	Wgt	Date of birth	Age	Debut	Recruited from	Games	Goals
28	(Victoria (state))	Robin Nahas	176	73	10 November 1987	28	2009	Oakleigh (U18), Richmond	109	131
31	(Queensland)	Braydon Preuss	206	107	16 July 1995	20		Townsville
37	(Victoria (state))	Will Fordham	188	84	14 March 1996	19		Sandringham (U18)
38	(Victoria (state))	Majak Daw	195	97	11 March 1991	24	2013	Western (U18)	16	17
44	(Western Australia)	Farren Ray	187	84	23 March 1986	29	2004	Western Bulldogs, St Kilda, Peel Thunder	205	58
Senior coaching panel
	State	Coach	Coaching position				Club Coaching debut	Former clubs as coach
	(Victoria (state))	Brad Scott	Senior coach				2010	Collingwood (d)
	(Victoria (state))	Jarred Moore	Assistant coach (Midfield/Stoppages)				2013
	(Victoria (state))	Leigh Tudor	Assistant coach (Forwards)				2013	Sydney (a), St Kilda (a), Geelong (a)
	(Tasmania)	Brad Green	Assistant coach (defence)				2016	Carlton (d)
	(Queensland)	Josh Drummond	Assistant coach (Transition)				2014
	(Victoria (state))	Gavin Brown	Senior Development Coach				2014	Carlton (a), Collingwood (a)
	(Victoria (state))	Darren Crocker	Director of Coaching				2005	North Melbourne (a), Richmond (a)
	(Western Australia)	Ben Dyer	Development manager				2014
	(Victoria (state))	David Loader	Development coach				2016

- For players: (c) denotes captain, (vc) denotes vice-captain, (lg) denotes leadership group.
- For coaches: (s) denotes senior coach, (cs) denotes caretaker senior coach, (a) denotes assistant coach, (d) denotes development coach.

== Playing list changes ==
The following summarises all player changes between the conclusion of the 2015 season and the beginning of the 2016 season.

=== In ===
Player	Previous Club	League	via
(Northern Territory) Jed Anderson	Hawthorn	AFL	Trade
(Victoria (state)) Ben McKay	Gippsland (U18)	TAC Cup	Pick 21, 2015 National Draft
(Victoria (state)) Ryan Clarke	Eastern (U18)	TAC Cup	Pick 31, 2015 National Draft
(Tasmania) Mitchell Hibberd	Clarence	TSL	Pick 33, 2015 National Draft
(Queensland) Corey Wagner	Aspley	NEAFL	Pick 43, 2015 National Draft
(Western Australia) Declan Mountford	Claremont	WAFL	Pick 60, 2015 National Draft
(Western Australia) Farren Ray	St Kilda	AFL	Pick 15, 2016 Rookie Draft

=== Out ===
Player	New Club	League	via
(Victoria (state)) Leigh Adams			Retired
(South Australia) Nathan Grima	Essendon	AFL	Retired
(Victoria (state)) Ryan Bastinac	Brisbane Lions	AFL	Traded
(Victoria (state)) Daniel Currie	Gold Coast	AFL	Traded
(Victoria (state)) Kieran Harper			Delisted
(South Australia) Scott McMahon			Delisted
(United States) Eric Wallace			Delisted
(Victoria (state)) Max Warren			Delisted

=== List management ===
Player	Change
(Victoria (state)) Majak Daw	Demoted from the senior list to the rookie list

== Season summary ==
=== Pre-season matches ===
**Rd**	**Date and local time**	**Opponent**	**Scores** (North's scores indicated in **bold**)			**Venue**	**Attendance**
**Rd**	**Date and local time**	**Opponent**	Home	Away	Result	**Venue**	**Attendance**
1	Saturday, 20 February (2:05 pm)	St Kilda	1.9.10 (73)	**0.18.9 (117)**	Won by 44 points	Norm Minns Oval (A)	6,216
2	Saturday, 5 March (4:40 pm)	Collingwood	**1.10.8 (77)**	0.12.13 (85)	Lost by 8 points	Robertson Oval (H)	6,000
3	Friday, 11 March (5:50 pm)	Hawthorn	2.16.11 (125)	**0.12.8 (80)**	Lost by 45 points	Etihad Stadium (A)	8,894

=== Home and away season ===
**Rd**	**Date and local time**	**Opponent**	**Scores** (North's scores indicated in **bold**)			**Venue**	**Attendance**	**Ladder** **position**	**Record**	**Ref.**
**Rd**	**Date and local time**	**Opponent**	Home	Away	Result	**Venue**	**Attendance**	**Ladder** **position**	**Record**	**Ref.**
1	Saturday, 26 March (7:25 pm)	Adelaide	**16.11 (107)**	14.13 (97)	Won by 10 points	Etihad Stadium (H)	25,485	**8th**	1-0	
2	Saturday, 2 April (3:35 pm)	Brisbane Lions	11.17 (83)	**17.15 (117)**	Won by 34 points	The Gabba (A)	18,021	**4th**	2-0	
3	Sunday, 10 April (1:10 pm)	Melbourne	**21.10 (136)**	20.11 (131)	Won by 5 points	Blundstone Arena (H)	12,607	**3rd**	3-0	
4	Sunday, 17 April (4:40 pm)	Fremantle	**20.12 (132)**	14.17 (101)	Won by 31 points	Etihad Stadium (H)	23,393	**1st**	4-0	
5	Saturday, 23 April (4:35 pm)	Gold Coast	11.15 (81)	**18.11 (119)**	Won by 38 points	Metricon Stadium (A)	13,351	**1st**	5-0	
6	Friday, 29 April (7:50 pm)	Western Bulldogs	**9.7 (61)**	6.9 (45)	Won by 16 points	Etihad Stadium (H)	47,622	**1st**	6-0	
7	Sunday, 8 May (5:50 pm)	St Kilda	11.9 (75)	**11.16 (82)**	Won by 7 points	Etihad Stadium (A)	27,254	**1st**	7-0	
8	Saturday, 14 May (1:45 pm)	Essendon	8.12 (60)	**10.14 (74)**	Won by 14 points	Etihad Stadium (A)	30,321	**1st**	8-0	
9	Saturday, 21 May (7:25 pm)	Carlton	**17.11 (113)**	6.10 (46)	Won by 67 points	Etihad Stadium (H)	38,419	**1st**	9-0	
10	Friday, 27 May (7:50 pm)	Sydney	14.7 (91)	**9.11 (65)**	Lost by 26 points	Sydney Cricket Ground (A)	38,498	**1st**	9-1	
11	Friday, 3 June (7:50 pm)	Richmond	**18.16 (124)**	7.12 (54)	Won by 70 points	Blundstone Arena (H)	17,844	**1st**	10-1	
12	Saturday, 11 June (7:25 pm)	Geelong	15.15 (105)	**12.2 (74)**	Lost by 31 points	Etihad Stadium (A)	44,025	**1st**	10-2	
13	Friday, 17 June (7:50 pm)	Hawthorn	**11.18 (86)**	14.9 (93)	Lost by 9 points	Etihad Stadium (H)	37,073	**3rd**	10-3	
14	Thursday, 23 June (7:20 pm)	Adelaide	12.28 (100)	**10.7 (67)**	Lost by 33 points	Adelaide Oval (A)	37,890	**5th**	10-4	
15	Bye							**7th**	10-4	
16	Sunday, 10 July (1:20 pm)	West Coast	16.8 (104)	**11.6 (72)**	Lost by 32 points	Domain Stadium (A)	35,168	**8th**	10-5	
17	Saturday, 16 July (4:35 pm)	Port Adelaide	**10.17 (77)**	16.9 (105)	Lost by 28 points	Etihad Stadium (H)	24,361	**8th**	10-6	
18	Saturday, 23 July (1:45 pm)	Collingwood	12.12 (84)	**18.16 (124)**	Won by 40 points	Etihad Stadium (A)	36,041	**8th**	11-6	
19	Saturday, 30 July (7:25 pm)	St Kilda	**12.13 (85)**	8.14 (62)	Won by 23 points	Etihad Stadium (H)	44,287	**8th**	12-6	
20	Saturday, 6 August (7:25 pm)	Western Bulldogs	9.7 (61)	**7.5 (47)**	Lost by 14 points	Etihad Stadium (A)	30,740	**8th**	12-7	
21	Saturday, 13 August (2:10 pm)	Hawthorn	14.12 (96)	**8.9 (57)**	Lost by 39 points	Melbourne Cricket Ground (A)	50,657	**8th**	12-8	
22	Saturday, 20 August (1:45 pm)	Sydney	**10.16 (76)**	12.13 (85)	Lost by 9 points	Blundstone Arena (H)	16,495	**8th**	12-9	
23	Saturday, 27 August (7:25 pm)	Greater Western Sydney	**9.9 (63)**	14.16 (100)	Lost by 37 points	Etihad Stadium (H)	22,295	**8th**	12-10	

=== Finals matches ===
**Rd**	**Date and local time**	**Opponent**	**Scores** (North's scores indicated in **bold**)			**Venue**	**Attendance**	**Ref**
**Rd**	**Date and local time**	**Opponent**	Home	Away	Result	**Venue**	**Attendance**	**Ref**
EF	Saturday, 10 September (7:10 pm)	Adelaide	21.15 (141)	**12.7 (79)**	Lost by 62 points	Adelaide Oval (A)	49,007	

== Ladder ==
Pos	Team	Pld	W	L	D	PF	PA	PP	Pts	Qualification
1	Sydney	22	17	5	0	2221	1469	151.2	68	2016 finals
2	Geelong	22	17	5	0	2235	1554	143.8	68	2016 finals
3	Hawthorn	22	17	5	0	2134	1800	118.6	68	2016 finals
4	Greater Western Sydney	22	16	6	0	2380	1663	143.1	64	2016 finals
5	Adelaide	22	16	6	0	2483	1795	138.3	64	2016 finals
6	West Coast	22	16	6	0	2181	1678	130.0	64	2016 finals
7	Western Bulldogs (P)	22	15	7	0	1857	1609	115.4	60	2016 finals
8	North Melbourne	22	12	10	0	1956	1859	105.2	48	2016 finals
9	St Kilda	22	12	10	0	1953	2041	95.7	48	
10	Port Adelaide	22	10	12	0	2055	1939	106.0	40	
11	Melbourne	22	10	12	0	1944	1991	97.6	40	
12	Collingwood	22	9	13	0	1910	1998	95.6	36	
13	Richmond	22	8	14	0	1713	2155	79.5	32	
14	Carlton	22	7	15	0	1568	1978	79.3	28	
15	Gold Coast	22	6	16	0	1778	2273	78.2	24	
16	Fremantle	22	4	18	0	1574	2119	74.3	16	
17	Brisbane Lions	22	3	19	0	1770	2872	61.6	12	
18	Essendon	22	3	19	0	1437	2356	61.0	12	

Source: AFL
Rules for classification: 1) points; 2) percentage; 3) number of points for.
(P) Premiers

== Individual awards and records ==
=== Milestones ===
Milestones
No.	State	Player	Milestone	Round
22	(Victoria (state))	Todd Goldstein	150th career game	Round 1
30	(Victoria (state))	Jarrad Waite	300th career goal	Round 2
20	(Victoria (state))	Drew Petrie	300th career game	Round 7
5	(Victoria (state))	Ben Jacobs	50th club game	Round 7
15	(Victoria (state))	Nick Dal Santo	50th club game	Round 10
29	(Victoria (state))	Brent Harvey	500th career goal	Round 11
21	(Victoria (state))	Luke McDonald	50th career game	Round 13
12	(South Australia)	Lindsay Thomas	300th career goal	Round 13
9	(Western Australia)	Andrew Swallow	200th career game	Round 16
43	(Victoria (state))	Sam Gibson	100th career game	Round 16
50	(Tasmania)	Ben Brown	50th career game	Round 18
29	(Victoria (state))	Brent Harvey	427th career game (AFL record)	Round 19
34	(Victoria (state))	Jamie Macmillan	100th career game	Round 20

=== Debuts ===
Debuts
No.	State	Player	Round
3	(Northern Territory)	Jed Anderson	Round 1^{1}
44	(Victoria (state))	Farren Ray	Round 9^{1}
41	(Queensland)	Corey Wagner	Round 13
13	(Victoria (state))	Ryan Clarke	Round 16

^{1}Had previously played for another club but played their first match for the North Melbourne.

=== AFL Rising Star ===
AFL Rising Star
No.	State	Player	Status	Round
13	(Victoria (state))	Ryan Clarke	Nominated	Round 18
