= Brad Scott (Australian footballer) =

Australian rules footballer (born 1976)

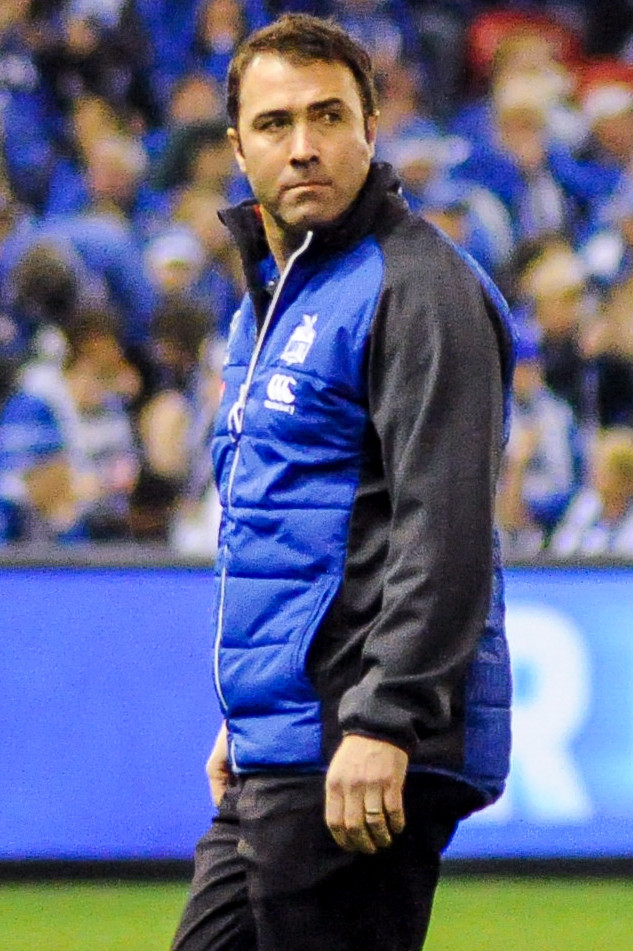
- Scott with North Melbourne in 2017

Personal information
- Full name: Bradley David Walter Scott
- Born: 3 May 1976 (age 50); Melbourne, Victoria
- Original team: Eastern Ranges (TAC Cup)
- Draft: No. 60, 1994 national draft
- Height: 181 cm (5 ft 11 in)
- Weight: 87 kg (192 lb)

Playing career^{1}
Years	Club	Games (Goals)
1997	Hawthorn	22 (6)
1998–2006	Brisbane Lions	146 (39)
Total		168 (45)

Coaching career^{3}
Years	Club	Games (W–L–D)
2010–2019	North Melbourne	211 (106–105–0)
2023–2026	Essendon	80 (29–50–1)
Total		291 (135–155–1)
- ^{1} Playing statistics correct to the end of 2006.^{3} Coaching statistics correct as of round 11, 2026.

Career highlights
- 2× AFL premiership player: 2001, 2002; AFL Rising Star nominee: 1997; Ranks second for most games coached without making a Grand Final

Bradley David Walter Scott (born 3 May 1976) is a former Australian rules footballer in the Australian Football League (AFL). He played for Hawthorn and the Brisbane Lions, and was previously the coach of the North Melbourne Football Club from 2010 until 2019 and Essendon Football Club from 2023 until 2026.

Scott currently ranks second behind Ken Hinkley for most AFL/VFL games coached without making a grand final, after surpassing Terry Wallace in 2024.

== Playing career ==
=== Hawthorn ===
Scott was recruited to Hawthorn in the 1994 national draft at pick 60, without playing a game, he was delisted and then re-drafted by Hawthorn in the 1996 draft, where he won the reserves best-and-fairest. Making his senior debut in 1997, Brad played all 22 games and was seen as a very solid contributor, but was traded at the end of that season to the Brisbane Lions, enabling him to play in the same side as his brother Chris.

Brad Scott played a total of 22 games and kicked 6 goals in the 1997 season, for Hawthorn Football Club.

=== Brisbane Lions ===
Scott was a very solid contributor over a number of years with the Lions and was seen as a fearless figure in defence. While defiant, Scott battled numerous injuries including one incurred during his milestone 150th game late in 2005.

Like his brother, Scott was renowned for being one of the hardest players in the league. They were both integral members of the Brisbane Lions' first two premierships in 2001 and 2002.

Injuries saw him miss the 2003 premiership and sidelined for the latter part of 2004.

Scott's lacklustre form in 2004 and 2005 fed speculation that his contract with the Lions would not be renewed, however he remained with the club and announced on 10 August 2006 that he would retire from his playing career at the end of the 2006 season. Scott played his farewell game in Round 22 against the Saints.

Brad Scott played a total of 146 games and kicked a total of 39 goals for Brisbane Lions from 1998 until 2006. He was also a member of the Brisbane Lions premiership teams in 2001 and 2002

== Coaching career ==
=== Collingwood (2007–2009) ===
After retiring from playing, Scott became an assistant coach as the development coach at Collingwood under senior coach Mick Malthouse, where he had success working closely with a number of players.

=== North Melbourne (2010–2019) ===
Scott had been a candidate for the vacant coaching position at Richmond, however he believed his skill set better suited North Melbourne far better and was appointed as senior coach of North Melbourne for the 2010 season, signing a three-year contract on 17 August 2009. Scott replaced caretaker senior coach Darren Crocker, who replaced Dean Laidley after Laidley resigned in the middle of the 2009 season.

Scott had a terrible start to his coaching career, with three of the first four matches resulting in losses, including a 104-point thrashing from 2009 runners-up St Kilda. Since then, North Melbourne made steady progress and finished outside the top eight on percentage.

Although North Melbourne missed the finals for the second year in succession, Scott was rewarded with a contract extension, with president James Brayshaw stating that he was satisfied with the club's progress under Scott. He led the team to 8th position, doing so secured a spot in the 2012 finals series, with the side winning ten of its last twelve matches (including six in a row between Rounds 16–21) following a 115-point loss to Hawthorn in Round 10. The club was then defeated in their elimination final match against West Coast by 96 points.

Following North Melbourne's disappointing season in 2013 after losing 10 matches by 16 points or less, the 2014 season began with a positive outlook as Nick Dal Santo was added to North Melbourne's list as a restricted free agent at the end of the 2013 season. With North Melbourne's midfield looking stronger, the success of the 2014 season saw Scott lead North Melbourne into his second finals series as coach after finishing 6th at the end of the home and away season. Winning their elimination final match against Essendon by 12 points, then defeating Geelong in the semi-final to progress to Scott's' first preliminary final as coach against Sydney, but the 71-point loss ended North Melbourne's finals run.

The beginning of the 2015 season once again saw Scott make some vital inclusions to North Melbourne's list, with the addition of tall-forward Jarrad Waite and medium forward/midfielder Shaun Higgins. Despite finishing 8th, Scott was under scrutiny after a highly controversial decision to rest 9 players in Round 23 against Richmond, which was deemed by many to be a form of 'tanking'. Scott's 'plan' however, proved to be successful after defeating Richmond in the elimination final the following week by 17 points and going on to defeat Sydney in the semi-final to become the first ever team to reach a preliminary final after finishing 8th in the home and away season. North Melbourne's run was ended by West Coast at Domain Stadium by 25 points.

Scott resigned as senior coach of North Melbourne on 26 May 2019 in the middle of the 2019 season, after ten rounds. At the time, he held the record for most games coached at any one club in AFL/VFL history without making a Grand Final. Scott was then replaced by assistant coach Rhyce Shaw as caretaker senior coach of North Melbourne for the rest of the 2019 season, who was eventually appointed as full-time senior coach.

=== Essendon (2023–2026) ===
Scott was appointed as the senior coach of Essendon for 2023 in September 2022. Scott replaced Ben Rutten, who was sacked as senior coach of Essendon at the end of the 2022 season.

In Scott's first season in charge in 2023, Essendon had an 8-5 win-loss record and were sitting 6th on the ladder at the time of their bye, however Essendon only won 3 of their final ten games post the bye with 7 losses, slumping to an 11th place finish. The season ended with a 126-point defeat to Greater Western Sydney followed by a 70-point defeat to Collingwood.

Scott's second season in charge followed a similar script to the first, starting with an 8-2 record with one draw after 11 rounds, however after that point only won 3 of their final twelve games to again slump to 11th position, despite having sat 2nd after round 12. On the eve of the 2025 season, Essendon extended Scott's contract by another year to take him to the end of 2026 season.

Scott was sacked as senior coach of Essendon on 26 May 2026 in the middle of the 2026 AFL season after Round 11, 2026 due to poor on-field performance results where the club sat last on the ladder with one win and ten losses. Scott was then replaced by assistant coach Dean Solomon as caretaker senior coach of Essendon for the remainder of the 2026 AFL season.

== Statistics ==
=== Playing statistics ===
Legend
G	Goals	K	Kicks	D	Disposals	T	Tackles
B	Behinds	H	Handballs	M	Marks
#	Played in that season's premiership team

Season	Team	No.	Games	Totals							Averages (per game)							Votes
Season	Team	No.	Games	G	B	K	H	D	M	T	G	B	K	H	D	M	T	Votes
1997	Hawthorn	28	22	6	7	233	101	334	75	36	0.3	0.3	10.6	4.6	15.2	3.4	1.6	0
1998	Brisbane Lions	5	19	5	6	201	106	307	52	32	0.3	0.3	10.6	5.6	16.2	2.7	1.7	1
1999	Brisbane Lions	5	8	0	2	49	16	65	14	9	0.0	0.3	6.1	2.0	8.1	1.8	1.1	0
2000	Brisbane Lions	5	0	—	—	—	—	—	—	—	—	—	—	—	—	—	—	–
2001^{#}	Brisbane Lions	5	22	14	4	197	108	305	84	44	0.6	0.2	9.0	4.9	13.9	3.8	2.0	3
2002^{#}	Brisbane Lions	5	25	8	10	315	179	494	136	55	0.3	0.4	12.6	7.2	19.8	5.4	2.2	0
2003	Brisbane Lions	5	22	5	8	245	166	411	112	48	0.2	0.4	11.1	7.5	18.7	5.1	2.2	3
2004	Brisbane Lions	5	15	4	1	138	89	227	60	30	0.3	0.1	9.2	5.9	15.1	4.0	2.0	0
2005	Brisbane Lions	5	17	2	1	115	92	207	55	14	0.1	0.1	6.8	5.4	12.2	3.2	0.8	0
2006	Brisbane Lions	5	18	1	1	151	115	266	88	43	0.1	0.1	8.4	6.4	14.8	4.9	2.4	0
Career			168	45	40	1644	972	2616	676	311	0.3	0.2	9.8	5.8	15.6	4.0	1.9	7

== Head coaching record ==
Team	Year	Home and Away Season					Finals			
Team	Year	Won	Lost	Drew	Win %	Position	Won	Lost	Win %	Result
NTH	2010	11	11	0	.500	9th out of 16	—	—	—	—
NTH	2011	10	12	0	.455	9th out of 17	—	—	—	—
NTH	2012	14	8	0	.636	8th out of 18	0	1	.500	Lost to West Coast in Elimination Final
NTH	2013	10	12	0	.455	10th out of 18	—	—	—	—
NTH	2014	14	8	0	.636	6th out of 18	2	1	.667	Lost to Sydney in Preliminary Final
NTH	2015	11	7	0	.611	8th out of 18	2	1	.500	Lost to West Coast in Preliminary Final
NTH	2016	11	10	0	.524	8th out of 18	0	1	.500	Lost to Adelaide in Elimination Final
NTH	2017	6	16	0	.273	15th out of 18	—	—	—	—
NTH	2018	12	10	0	.545	9th out of 18	—	—	—	—
NTH	2019	3	7	0	.300	14th out of 18	—	—	—	resigned after Round 10
NTH Total		102	101	0	.503		4	4	.500	
ESS	2023	11	12	0	.478	11th out of 18	—	—	—	—
ESS	2024	11	11	1	.500	11th out of 18	—	—	—	—
ESS	2025	6	17	0	.261	15th out of 18	—	—	—	—
ESS	2026	1	10	0	.091	18th out of 18	—	—	—	fired after Round 11
ESS Total		29	50	1	.369	—	—	—	—	
Total		131	151	1	.465		4	4	.500	

== Controversies ==
=== May 2024 comments about Tarryn Thomas ===
In May 2024, while senior coach of Essendon, Scott said in a televised press interview that former North Melbourne player Tarryn Thomas was a "good person" and "deserved a second chance" despite a litany of criminal charges, including in 2023 when Thomas was charged with threatening to distribute an intimate image; Thomas was later stood down by the club, and the case was dropped, and Thomas was ordered to pay $1,000 to charity. The charge was Thomas's second over the 2022–23 AFL off-season after he was previously caught driving while his licence was suspended. Additionally, in a now-deleted Instagram video posted by Thomas, he appeared to have his feet up on a Mercedes dashboard while driving. Scott's comment in defence of Thomas was slammed by the public at large and by media personalities such as former AFL champion Jimmy Bartel, himself a staunch campaigner against domestic violence. Scott's comments were seen as particularly tone-deaf considering the AFL had an upcoming round bringing attention to victims of domestic abuse.

== Personal life ==
Scott's identical twin brother Chris Scott played alongside him at the Brisbane Lions and is now the coach of Geelong. Brad is the younger twin by a few minutes. The twins both attended St Kevin’s College, their fees aided by Legacy following the circumstances of their father's death when they were eight years old.

In September 2014, Scott's wife Penny gave birth to their first child, a son.

Scott's favourite film is Clueless and his favourite song is the Dire Straits single "Money For Nothing".
