= Jamarra Ugle-Hagan =

Australian rules footballer (born 2002)

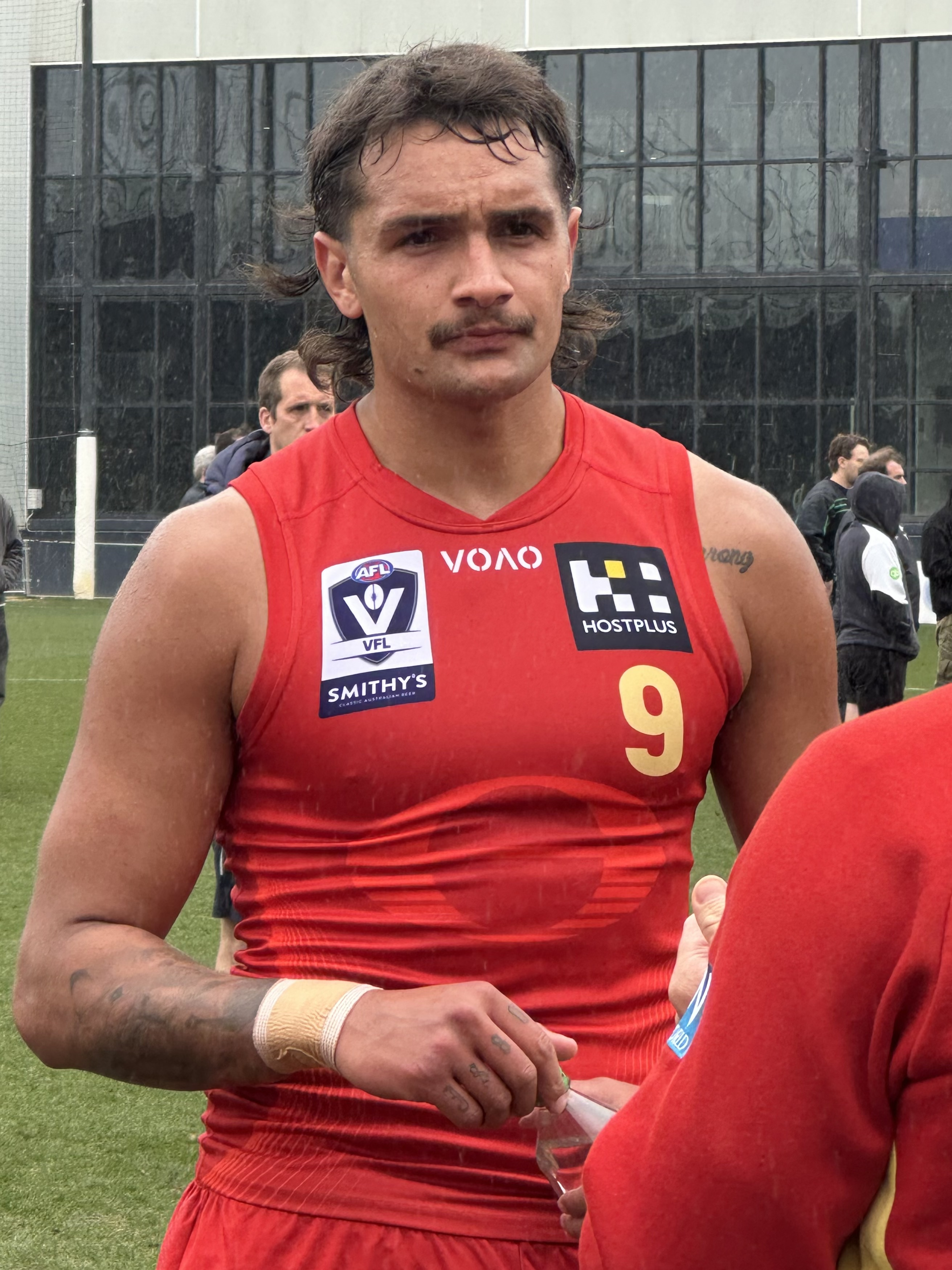
- Ugle-Hagan in July 2026

Personal information
- Full name: Jamarra Ugle-Hagan
- Nicknames: 'Marra, JU-H
- Born: 4 April 2002 (age 24); Framlingham, Victoria
- Original teams: Oakleigh Chargers (NAB League); South Warrnambool Football Club
- Draft: No. 1, 2020 national draft No. 64, 2026 national draft
- Debut: Round 17, 2021, Western Bulldogs vs. Sydney Swans, at Marvel Stadium
- Height: 197 cm (6 ft 6 in)
- Weight: 91 kg (201 lb)
- Position: Key forward

Club information
- Current club: Gold Coast
- Number: 9

Playing career^{1}
Years	Club	Games (Goals)
2021–2025	Western Bulldogs	67 (103)
2026–	Gold Coast	3 (4)
Total		70 (107)
- ^{1} Playing statistics correct to the end of 2026.

Career highlights
- Western Bulldogs leading goalkicker: 2024; AFL Rising Star nominee: 2022; 2× 22under22 team: 2023, 2024

Jamarra Ugle-Hagan (born 4 April 2002) is a professional Australian rules footballer with the Gold Coast Suns in the Australian Football League (AFL).

== Early life and education ==
Ugle-Hagan was born in Framlingham Aboriginal Reserve in south-west Victoria into a family of Indigenous Australian (Noongar-Gunditjmara-Djab Wurrun) and Irish descent. He attended secondary school at Warrnambool College, before moving to Scotch College as a boarder in year 9.

== Early career ==
He first played for East Warrnambool and South Warrnambool at a community football level, before progressing to Oakleigh Chargers in the NAB League.

== AFL career ==
=== Rise: 2021–2022 ===
He was a member of the Western Bulldogs' Next Generation Academy, which helps scout and develop Aboriginal and multicultural players, and people who would not otherwise play the sport of Australian rules football.

Ugle-Hagan was taken at Pick 1 in the 2020 national draft, when the Western Bulldogs matched the Adelaide Crows' bid. He is the first Bulldogs No.1 Draft Pick since Adam Cooney in 2003, and only the second Indigenous player to be taken with the first selection since Des Headland in 1998.

Ugle-Hagan played his first AFL game for the Western Bulldogs on 11 July 2021 in their Round 17 loss to the Sydney Swans. On debut, Ugle-Hagan collected seven disposals and one mark. Despite staying goalless, Ugle-Hagan was kept in the team for Round 18, where he kicked three goals in a strong performance against the Gold Coast Suns. On 5 August 2021, it was revealed that Ugle-Hagan signed on with the Bulldogs until the end of 2024.

Ugle-Hagan received a Rising Star nomination for his five-goal performance against Melbourne during Round 19 in 2022.

=== Breakout: 2023 ===
In Round 3 of the 2023 AFL season, Ugle-Hagan received a racist remark from a St Kilda supporter when walking off the field at the end of the game. The next week in their game against the Brisbane Lions, Ugle-Hagan kicked five goals in a low-scoring and tight game. As a celebration of one of his five goals, he lifted his shirt and pointed to his skin whilst looking at the crowd, emulating Nicky Winmar's iconic gesture under similar circumstances in a 1993 game. This started some career-best form for the young Ugle-Hagan, with a three-goal performance in Round 11 against Gold Coast, a four-goal performance alongside 12 disposals in Round 16 against Fremantle, and 2 goals with 13 disposals the week after against Collingwood. Ugle-Hagan had a breakout year in 2023, playing every game possible for the Western Bulldogs and finishing 2nd in their leading goalkicker tally with 35 goals.

=== Leading goalkicker: 2024 ===
Ugle-Hagan had a good year in 2024, playing 22 games and kicking 43 goals, to place him as the leading goalkicker for the Western Bulldogs for the season. Ugle-Hagan captured a brilliant patch of form from rounds 18 to 20 in which he kicked 12 goals from 3 games.

=== Estrangement and off-field controversy: 2025 ===
Over the summer of 2024/25, Ugle-Hagan had personal issues and spent time away from the club due to what he would later describe as frequent suicidal thoughts, revealing in an interview with the Rip Through It podcast that "It got to a point where I had to give my car to a mate so I couldn't drive – I just didn't trust myself driving." He made some appearances at training at Whitten Oval during the pre-season as part of a flexible arrangement with the club.

In June 2025, Ugle-Hagan's car was used in a drive-by shooting of a 71-year-old man, although the man was uninjured. Ugle-Hagan was cleared of any charges. While it is unknown who was driving the car during the assault, Ugle-Hagan was cooperative in the investigation and fully cleared. He later stated that another one of his cars, a Toyota, had also been stolen.

Ugle Hagan played no AFL games in 2025 and was linked to a move to Gold Coast towards the end of the season. With 2 hours left on deadline day, Ugle Hagan made his move to the Gold Coast Suns on a one-year deal in exchange for pick 74.

== Statistics ==
Updated to the end of round 22, 2026.

Legend
G	Goals	K	Kicks	D	Disposals	T	Tackles
B	Behinds	H	Handballs	M	Marks

Season	Team	No.	Games	Totals							Averages (per game)							Votes
Season	Team	No.	Games	G	B	K	H	D	M	T	G	B	K	H	D	M	T	Votes
2021	Western Bulldogs	22	5	7	2	25	10	35	14	8	1.4	0.4	5.0	2.0	7.0	2.8	1.6	0
2022	Western Bulldogs	2	17	18	16	100	34	134	60	18	1.1	0.9	5.9	2.0	7.9	3.5	1.1	2
2023	Western Bulldogs	2	23	35	35	188	73	261	120	22	1.5	1.5	8.2	3.2	11.3	5.2	1.0	5
2024	Western Bulldogs	2	22	43	35	187	64	251	96	32	2.0	1.6	8.5	2.9	11.4	4.4	1.5	3
2025	Western Bulldogs	2	0	—	—	—	—	—	—	—	—	—	—	—	—	—	—	0
2026	Gold Coast	9	3	4	3	15	2	17	8	2	1.3	1.0	5.0	0.7	5.7	2.7	0.7	0
Career			70	107	91	515	183	698	298	82	1.5	1.3	7.4	2.6	10.0	4.3	1.2	10

== Honours and achievements ==
Individual

- AFL Rising Star nominee: 2022
- 2x 22under22 team: 2023, 2024
