= Brett Bowey =

Australian rules footballer

Personal information
- Full name: Brett Bowey
- Born: 31 May 1969 (age 57)
- Original team: St Kilda City
- Height: 168 cm (5 ft 6 in)
- Weight: 72 kg (159 lb)
- Position: Rover

Playing career^{1}
Years	Club	Games (Goals)
1988–1994	St Kilda	85 (79)
- ^{1} Playing statistics correct to the end of 1994.

Brett Bowey (born 31 May 1969) is a former Australian rules footballer who played with St Kilda in the Victorian/Australian Football League (VFL/AFL).

Bowey, who was recruited locally, shared his VFL debut with future club great Robert Harvey and kicked two goals. A rover, he was a regular fixture in the St Kilda team in 1989 and 1990, putting together 19 games in each season. After making just four appearances in 1991, Bowey amassed a career-high 482 disposals in the 1992 AFL season, at an average of 22.95 a game. He also took part in St Kilda's finals series and had 27 disposals in their win over Collingwood.

After a season with Victorian Football League (VFL) club Frankston, Bowey finished his career at the Chelsea Football Club in the Mornington Peninsula Nepean Football League and played well into his 30s. A three-time "Best and Fairest" winner, Bowey retired after Chelsea's 2006 Grand Final win.

Bowey's sister, Belinda Bowey, was the first player to play 300 games in the Victorian Women's Football League (VFLW).

His son, Jake Bowey, is a premiership player with the Melbourne Demons.
