= Cheltenham Secondary College =

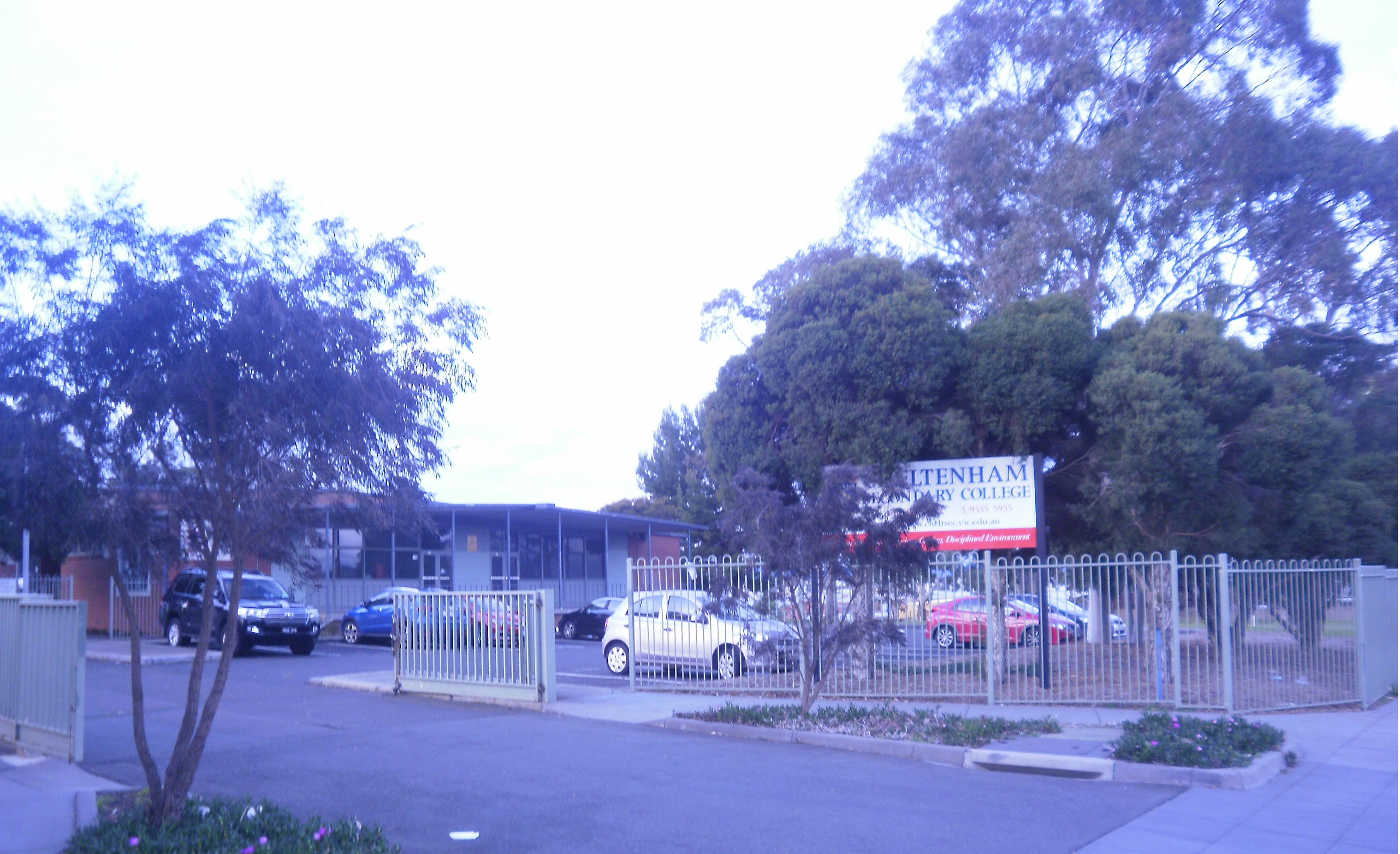

Location
- Cheltenham, Victoria; Australia; 37°57′12″S 145°04′06″E

Information
- Type: Public
- Motto: salutem et doctrina (Latin for health and learning)
- Established: 1959
- Principal: Karl Russel
- Enrolment: 883 (2022)
- Colours: Blue, red and yellow
- Website: www.cheltsec.vic.edu.au

Cheltenham Secondary College is a co-educational high school in Cheltenham, Victoria, Australia, catering for students in years 7 to 12. The school officially opened in 1959 as 'Cheltenham High School', and then later changed its name to Cheltenham Secondary College. The school participates in the Windsor-Cheltenham Exchange, an exchange between Avenues College in Adelaide and Cheltenham where a range of sports and other activities are played out over a week to see who will win the Exchange Shield, Captains Plate and Exchange Cup.

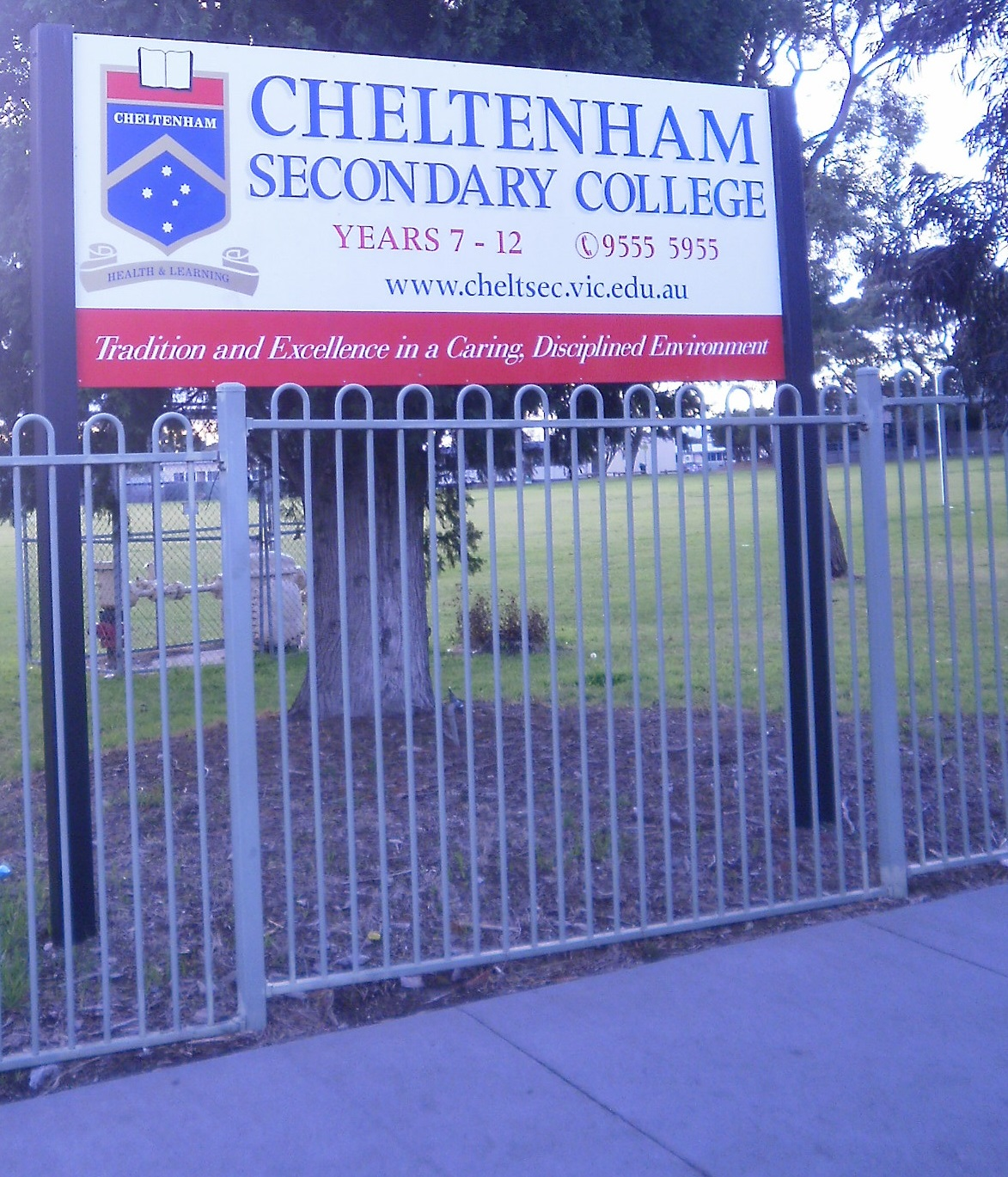
Cheltenham Secondary College sign

== Facilities ==
The sports centre opened in July 2003 and comprises two full-sized indoor courts, electronic scoreboard, fully equipped changing rooms, as well as kitchen and storage facilities. Physical education classes, weekly sport rotations and whole-school assemblies are regularly held in the sports centre.

The performing arts centre opened in late 2003 and was developed from the previous school hall. The centre comprises a 200-seat theatre, two music classrooms, two spacious drama/theatre studies classrooms as well as several music tuition rooms. The annual school production is presented in the centre.

In 2022, the Victorian Labor government committed to providing $7.3 million to upgrade the school if it won the 2022 Victorian state election. This funding was subsequently allocated in the 2023 state budget, with the upgrade forecast to be complete by 2026.

== Enrolment and school structure ==
The school is functionally divided into two sub-schools; a Junior School, catering for students in years 7 to 9; and a Senior School, catering for students in year 10 and VCE. While students from out of zone can apply to attend, most students live in the suburbs within the school’s catchment zone, including Cheltenham, Highett and Heatherton.

== Notable former students ==
- Jake Bowey
- Trevor Barker
