= Jake Bowey =

Australian rules footballer (born 2002)

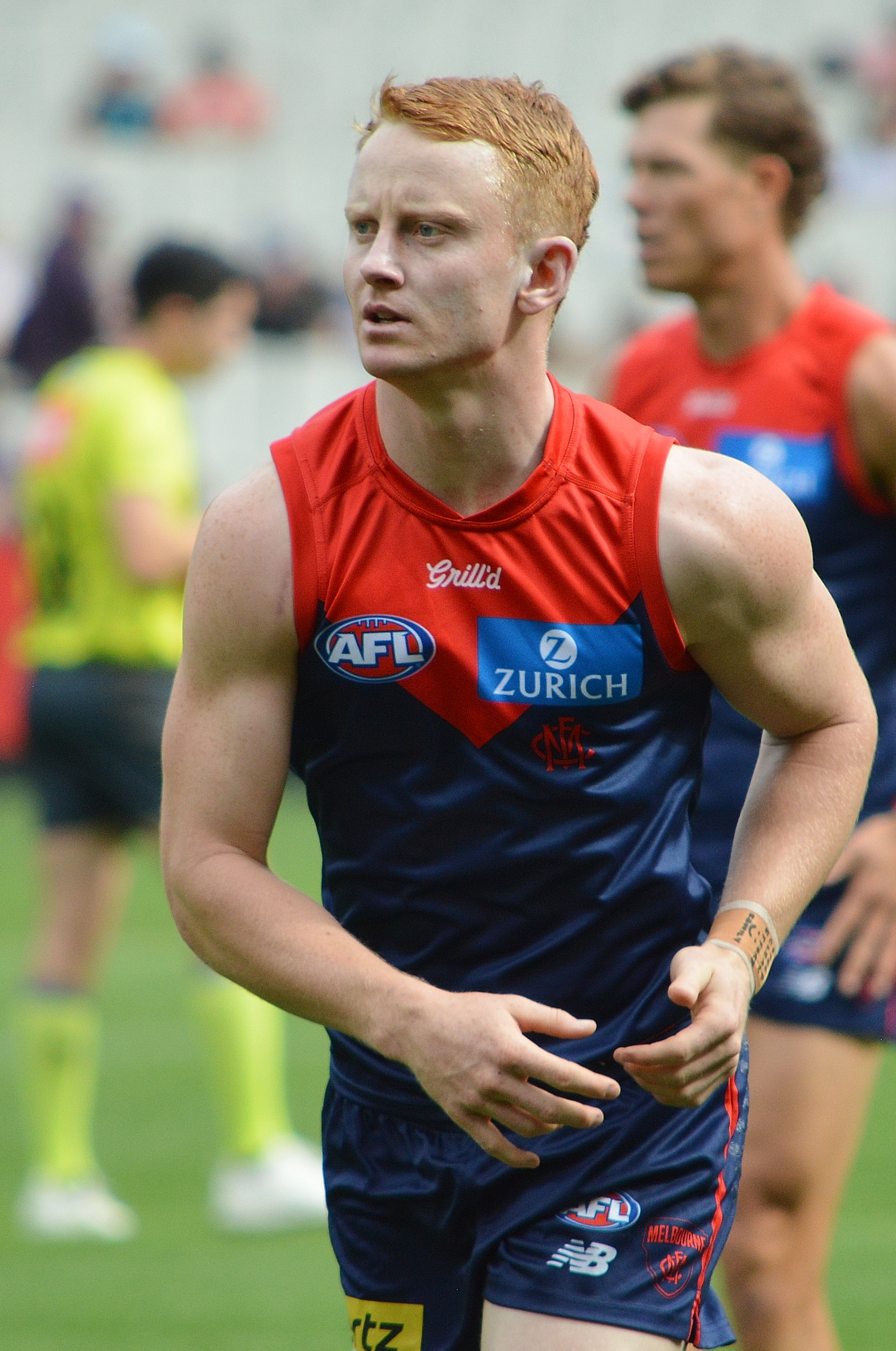
- Bowey in April 2025

Personal information
- Born: 12 September 2002 (age 24)
- Original team: Sandringham (NAB League)/Highett Football Club
- Draft: No. 21, 2020 national draft
- Height: 175 cm (5 ft 9 in)
- Weight: 72 kg (159 lb)
- Position: Defender / midfielder

Club information
- Current club: Melbourne
- Number: 17

Playing career
Years	Club	Games (Goals)
2021―	Melbourne	97 (10)

Career highlights
- AFL premiership player: 2021; Ivor-Warne Smith Memorial Trophy (4th MFC B&F): 2025; Harold Ball Memorial Trophy: 2022; 2× AFL Rising Star nominee: 2021, 2022

Jake Bowey (born 12 September 2002) is an Australian rules footballer who plays for the Melbourne Football Club in the Australian Football League (AFL).

== Early life ==
Bowey is the son of former St Kilda player Brett Bowey.

Bowey participated in the Auskick program at the Highett Football Club. He went on to play junior and senior football with the club and under-18 football with the Sandringham in the NAB League.

He was educated at Cheltenham Secondary College.

Bowey was drafted by the Melbourne Football Club with pick 21 in the 2020 AFL draft.

== AFL career ==
Bowey made his AFL debut in the Demons' 98-point victory against Gold Coast at Marvel Stadium in round 20, 2021. Bowey held his spot in the best 22, which propelled Melbourne to its first premiership since 1964. Bowey went on to feature in 17 consecutive wins for Melbourne to start his career, almost breaking the V/AFL record of Collingwood's Albert Lauder, set in the 1920s, when Lauder played in 18 consecutive wins to start his career.

Bowey was the AFL Rising Star nominee for round two of the 2022 season after accumlating 24 kicks and 10 handballs, including seven rebound 50s and nine marks against Gold Coast. This was Bowey's second nomination for the award after receiving a nomination in round 22 of 2021 against Adelaide.

After the 2023 AFL season, Bowey signed a new contract deal which would see him remain at Melbourne until the end of the 2026 season. Bowey was already contracted for 2024 but signed the new deal which added an additional two years. Melbourne List Manager Tim Lamb said about Bowey that, “We are thrilled to have Jake extend his contract and we believe he will continue to play a pivotal role in our journey towards success, Jake has been a really strong contributor for the Melbourne Football Club, and we look forward to seeing what he can achieve in the future.”

During Melbourne's 2024 AFL season opening round lost to Sydney, Bowey left the field after a third-quarter collision with Justin McInerney, with scans later revealing a broken collarbone. Bowey went on to have surgery and was sidelined for eight weeks.

== Statistics ==
Legend
G	Goals	K	Kicks	D	Disposals	T	Tackles
B	Behinds	H	Handballs	M	Marks

Season	Team	No.	Games	Totals							Averages (per game)							Votes
Season	Team	No.	Games	G	B	K	H	D	M	T	G	B	K	H	D	M	T	Votes
2021^{#}	Melbourne	17	7	0	0	61	58	119	23	5	0.0	0.0	8.7	8.3	17.0	3.3	0.7	0
2022	Melbourne	17	17	2	0	173	111	284	69	29	0.1	0.0	10.2	6.5	16.7	4.1	1.7	0
2023 (Note: 2023 statistics include two games in which Bowey was substituted out of the game due to injury (rounds 10 & 12).)	Melbourne	17	23	4	1	259	112	371	85	41	0.2	0.0	11.3	4.9	16.1	3.7	1.8	0
2024	Melbourne	17	14	0	2	160	64	224	65	20	0.0	0.1	11.4	4.6	16.0	4.6	1.4	0
2025	Melbourne	17	23	2	0	363	156	519	119	59	0.1	0.0	15.8	6.8	22.6	5.2	2.6	3
2026	Melbourne	17	13	2	2	231	97	328	58	32	0.2	0.2	17.8	7.5	25.2	4.5	2.5	0
Career			97	10	5	1247	598	1845	419	186	0.1	0.1	12.9	6.2	19.0	4.3	1.9	3

== Honours and achievements ==
Team

- AFL premiership player (Melbourne): 2021
- McClelland Trophy (Melbourne): 2021

Individual

- Ivor-Warne Smith Memorial Trophy (4th MFC B&F): 2025
- Harold Ball Memorial Trophy: 2022
- 2× AFL Rising Star nominee: 2021, 2022
