= 2022 AFL Rising Star =

Australian football award

2022 NAB AFL Rising Star
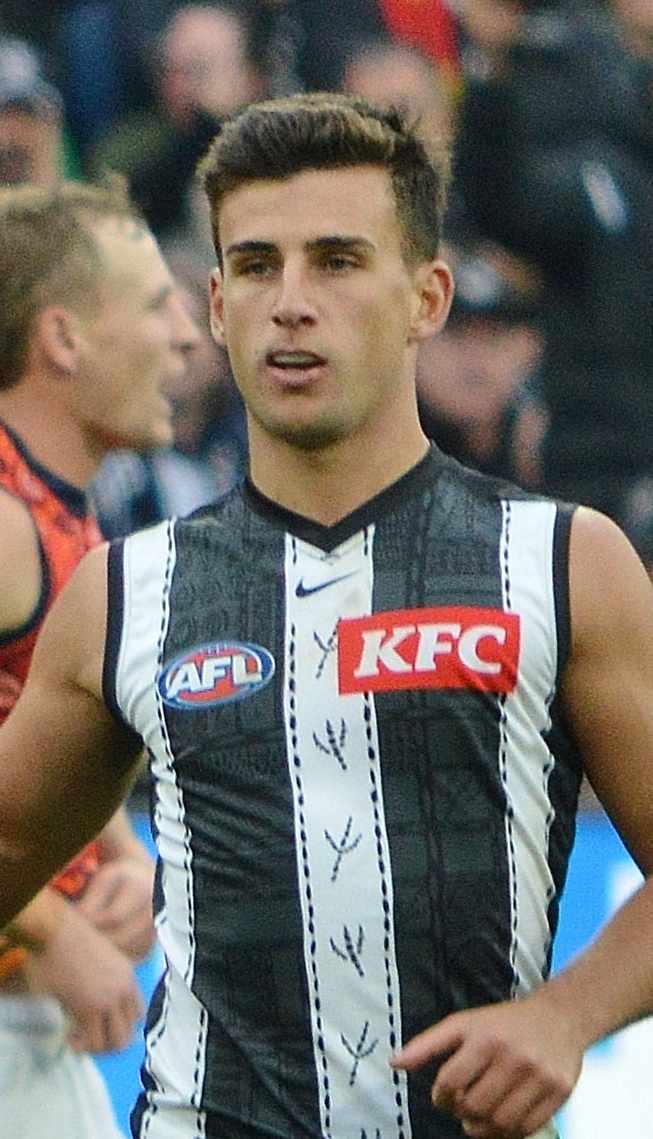
- Nick Daicos, recipient of the 2022 Rising Star award
- Sponsored by: National Australia Bank
- Date: 24 August 2022
- Country: Australia
- Ron Evans medallist: Nick Daicos (Collingwood)

The NAB AFL Rising Star award is given annually to a standout young player in the Australian Football League (AFL).

== Eligibility ==
Every round, a nomination is given to a standout young player who performed well during that particular round. To be eligible for nomination, a player must be under 21 on 1 January of that year and have played ten or fewer senior games before the start of the season; a player who is suspended may be nominated, but is not eligible to win the award.

== Nominations ==
2022 AFL Rising Star nominees
Round	Player	Club	Ref.
1	Nic Martin	Essendon	
2	Jake Bowey	Melbourne	
3	Nick Daicos	Collingwood	
4	Josh Rachele	Adelaide	
5	Jai Newcombe	Hawthorn	
6	Jack Ginnivan	Collingwood	
7	Jason Horne-Francis*	North Melbourne	
8	Heath Chapman	Fremantle	
9	Corey Durdin	Carlton	
10	Joel Jeffrey	Gold Coast	
11	Sam De Koning	Geelong	
12	Logan McDonald	Sydney	
13	Brandon Walker	Fremantle	
14	Ben Hobbs	Essendon	
15	Lachie Jones	Port Adelaide	
16	Massimo D'Ambrosio	Essendon	
17	Hugo Ralphsmith	Richmond	
18	Josh Ward	Hawthorn	
19	Jamarra Ugle-Hagan	Western Bulldogs	
20	Noah Cumberland	Richmond	
21	Elijah Hollands	Gold Coast	
22	Marcus Windhager	St Kilda	
23	Nathan O'Driscoll	Fremantle	

*ineligible to win the NAB Rising Star due to suspension.

== Final voting ==
	Player	Club	Votes
1	Nick Daicos	Collingwood	60
2	Sam De Koning	Geelong	48
3	Jai Newcombe	Hawthorn	35
4	Jack Ginnivan	Collingwood	21
5	Nic Martin	Essendon	12
6	Jake Bowey	Melbourne	2
7	Heath Chapman	Fremantle	1
7	Jamarra Ugle-Hagan	Western Bulldogs	1
