= 2018 North Melbourne Football Club season =

North Melbourne
2018 season
- President: Ben Buckley
- Coach: Brad Scott (9th season)
- Captains: Jack Ziebell (2nd season)
- Home grounds: Etihad Stadium (Capacity: 56,347); Blundstone Arena (Capacity: 19,500)
- AFLX JLT Community Series: 1-1; 0-2
- AFL season: 12-10 (9th)
- Leading goalkicker: Ben Brown
- Highest home attendance: 33,966 vs. St Kilda (Round 2)
- Lowest home attendance: 7,194 vs. Greater Western Sydney (Round 9)

The 2018 AFL season was the 93rd season in the Australian Football League (AFL) contested by the North Melbourne Football Club.

North Melbourne were widely predicted for a second-straight bottom six finish, including several predictions which would see them winning the wooden spoon. Strong performances by Shaun Higgins and Ben Brown meant the Kangaroos finished comfortably mid-table, finishing 9th with 48 points and a percentage of 108.9%.

== List changes ==
=== Retirements and delistings ===
**Player**	**Date**	**Reason**	**Career games**	**Career goals**	**Ref.**
Lachlan Hansen	29 August 2017	Delisted	151	81	
Will Fordham	30 August 2017	Delisted	0	0	
Matthew Taylor	30 August 2017	Delisted	0	0	
Aaron Mullett	10 October 2017	Delisted	85	31	
Corey Wagner	10 October 2017	Delisted	8	0	
Lindsay Thomas	3 November 2017	Delisted	205	325	
Andrew Swallow	9 November 2017	Retired	224	80	

=== Trades ===
**Date**	**Gained**	**From**	**Lost**	**Ref.**
19 October 2017	Pick 91	Adelaide	Sam Gibson	
19 October 2017	2018 third round pick (West Coast)	Port Adelaide	Pick 46	
19 October 2017	2018 third round pick (St Kilda)	Port Adelaide	2018 third round pick	

=== Free Agency ===
==== Gain ====
**Player**	**Date**	**Free agent type**	**Old club**	**Ref.**
Alex Morgan	1 November 2017	Delisted	Essendon	

==== National draft ====
**Round**	**Pick**	**Player**	**Recruited from**	**League**
1	4	Luke Davies-Uniacke	Dandenong Stingrays	TAC Cup
2	23	Will Walker	Sandringham Dragons	TAC Cup
4	62	Kyron Hayden	Subiaco Football Club	WAFL
5	72	Tristan Xerri	Western Jets	TAC Cup
5	77	Billy Hartung	Hawthorn	AFL

==== Rookie draft ====
**Round**	**Pick**	**Player**	**Recruited from**	**League**
1	4	Tom Murphy	Dandenong Stingrays	TAC Cup
2	20	Gordon Narrier	Perth Football Club	WAFL

==== Category B rookie selections ====
**Player**	**Recruited from**	Note	**Ref.**
Tom Jeffries	Werribee	3-year non-registered player (rugby)	

=== Season summary ===
==== Pre-season ====
===== AFLX =====
**Date and local time**	**Opponent**	**Scores** (North's scores indicated in **bold**)			**Venue**	**Attendance**	**Ref.**
**Date and local time**	**Opponent**	North Melbourne	Opponent	Result	**Venue**	**Attendance**	**Ref.**
Friday, 16 February (7:36 pm)	Carlton	**5.4.9 (83)**	5.2.6 (68)	Won by 15 points	Etihad Stadium	22,585	
Friday, 16 February (8:32 pm)	Melbourne	**3.2.4 (46)**	1.9.6 (70)	Lost by 24 points	Etihad Stadium	22,585	

===== JLT Community Series =====
**Rd**	**Date and local time**	**Opponent**	**Scores** (North's scores indicated in **bold**)			**Venue**	**Attendance**	**Ref**
**Rd**	**Date and local time**	**Opponent**	**Home**	**Away**	**Result**	**Venue**	**Attendance**	**Ref**
1	Saturday, 24 February (2:05 pm)	Melbourne	**11.5 (71)**	19.10 (124)	Lost by 53 points	Kingston Twin Ovals, Hobart (H)	1,957	
2	Wednesday, 7 March (7:05 pm)	Richmond	19.14 (128)	**8.10 (58)**	Lost by 70 points	Ikon Park (A)	4,197	

==== Home and away season ====
**Rd**	**Date and local time**	**Opponent**	**Scores** (North's scores indicated in **bold**)			**Venue**	**Attendance**	**Ladder** **position**	**Record**	**Ref.**
**Rd**	**Date and local time**	**Opponent**	Home	Away	Result	**Venue**	**Attendance**	**Ladder** **position**	**Record**	**Ref.**
1	Saturday, 24 March (6:25 pm)	Gold Coast	7.13 (55)	**5.9 (39)**	Lost by 16 points	Cazaly's Stadium	3,722	15th	0-1	
2	Friday, 30 March (4:20 pm)	St Kilda	**13.17 (95)**	5.13 (43)	Won by 52 points	Etihad Stadium	33,966	5th	1-1	
3	Saturday, 7 April (2:10 pm)	Melbourne	13.8 (86)	**5.13 (123)**	Lost by 37 points	Melbourne Cricket Ground	35,518	11th	1-2	
4	Saturday, 14 April (7:25 pm)	Carlton	**18.8 (116)**	4.6 (30)	Won by 84 points	Blundstone Arena	14,226	7th	2-2	
5	Sunday, 22 April (3:20 pm)	Hawthorn	**14.14 (98)**	11.4 (70)	Won by 28 points	Etihad Stadium	27,981	4th	3-2	
6	Saturday, 28 April (2:10 pm)	Port Adelaide	10.9 (69)	**15.12 (102)**	Lost by 33 points	Etihad Stadium	17,617	8th	3-3	
7	Saturday, 5 May (7:25 pm)	Sydney	**9.14 (68)**	9.12 (66)	Won by 2 points	Sydney Cricket Ground	29,214	7th	4-3	
8	Sunday, 13 May (1:10 pm)	Richmond	11.6 (72)	**12.10 (82)**	Lost by 10 points	Etihad Stadium	29,153	10th	4-4	
16	Sunday, 8 July (1:10 pm)	Gold Coast	**14.11 (95)**	8.10 (58)	Won by 37 points	Etihad Stadium	14,389	9th	9-6	
17	Sunday, 15 July (3:20 pm)	Sydney	15.8 (98)	**16.8 (104)**	Lost by 6 points	Etihad Stadium	25,663	9th	9-7	
18	Saturday, 21 July (1:45 pm)	Collingwood	**20.10 (130)**	9.10 (64)	Lost by 66 points	Melbourne Cricket Ground	50,393	10th	9-8	
19	Sunday, 29 July (1:10 pm)	West Coast	**12.9 (81)**	6.5 (41)	Won by 40 points	Blundstone Arena	11,176	10th	10-8	
20	Saturday, 4 August (2:40 pm)	Brisbane Lions	16.8 (104)	**16.11 (107)**	Won by 3 points	The Gabba	18,395	10th	11-8	
21	Sunday, 12 August (1:10 pm)	Western Bulldogs	12.13 (85)	**13.14 (92)**	Lost by 7 points	Etihad Stadium	27,031	10th	11-9	
22	Sunday, 19 August (4:10 pm)	Adelaide	**12.14 (86)**	11.11 (77)	Lost by 9 points	Adelaide Oval	41,444	10th	11-10	
23	Sunday, 26 August (4:40 pm)	St Kilda	14.10 (94)	**17.15 (117)**	Won by 23 points	Etihad Stadium	19,866	9th	12-10	

===== Ladder =====
Pos	Team	Pld	W	L	D	PF	PA	PP	Pts	Qualification
1	Richmond	22	18	4	0	2143	1574	136.1	72	2018 finals
2	West Coast (P)	22	16	6	0	2012	1657	121.4	64	2018 finals
3	Collingwood	22	15	7	0	2046	1699	120.4	60	2018 finals
4	Hawthorn	22	15	7	0	1972	1642	120.1	60	2018 finals
5	Melbourne	22	14	8	0	2299	1749	131.4	56	2018 finals
6	Sydney	22	14	8	0	1822	1664	109.5	56	2018 finals
7	Greater Western Sydney	22	13	8	1	1898	1661	114.3	54	2018 finals
8	Geelong	22	13	9	0	2045	1554	131.6	52	2018 finals
**9**	North Melbourne	**22**	**12**	**10**	**0**	**1950**	**1790**	**108.9**	48	
10	Port Adelaide	22	12	10	0	1780	1654	107.6	48	
11	Essendon	22	12	10	0	1932	1838	105.1	48	
12	Adelaide	22	12	10	0	1941	1865	104.1	48	
13	Western Bulldogs	22	8	14	0	1575	2037	77.3	32	
14	Fremantle	22	8	14	0	1556	2041	76.2	32	
15	Brisbane Lions	22	5	17	0	1825	2049	89.1	20	
16	St Kilda	22	4	17	1	1606	2125	75.6	18	
17	Gold Coast	22	4	18	0	1308	2182	59.9	16	
18	Carlton	22	2	20	0	1353	2282	59.3	8	

Source: AFL
Rules for classification: 1) points; 2) percentage; 3) number of points for.
(P) Premiers

== VFL ==
North Melbourne
2018 season
- Coach: David Loader (1st season)
- Captains: Christopher Jansen (1st season); Micheal Close (1st season)
- Home ground: Avalon Airport Oval (Capacity: 10,000)
- VFL season: 5-4 (in progress)

The 2018 VFL season was the 1st season in the Victorian Football League contested by the North Melbourne Football Club.

=== Playing Squad ===
North Melbourne Football Club (reserves)
Playing list		Coaching staff
51 Tom Hotchin; 52 Nicholas Rippon; 53 Tyrone Leonardis; 54 Jordan McIvor-Clark; 55 Mitch Rodd; 58 Jordan Harper; 59 Nash Holmes; 60 Steven Stroobants; 61 Christopher Jansen (c); 62 Fraser Cameron; 63 Koe Ngawat; 64 Louis Cunningham	65 Micheal Close (c); 66 Patrick McCarthy; 67 Brandon Ryan; 68 Quintin Montanaro; 69 Liam Whelan; 70 Nicholas Hogan; 71 Matthew Northe; 72 Christopher Peart; 73 Rhys Free; 80 Max Hayes; 81 Jordan Mangan; 82 Lachlan Mirams	Head coach: David Loader; Assistant coaches: Ben Dyer (forwards); Gavin Brown (backline); Robbie Waters (midfield); Ben Davey (forwards); Jordan Doering (backline); Chris Jansen (Playing/Assistant Coach)(midfield); Legend: (c) Captain(s); (vc) Vice-captain(s); Updated: 13 June 2018; Source(s): Playing list, Coaching staff

=== Ladder ===
Pos	Team	Pld	W	L	D	PF	PA	PP	Pts	Qualification
1	Richmond	18	14	4	0	1911	1198	159.5	56	Finals series
2	Casey Demons	18	14	4	0	1593	1128	141.2	56	Finals series
3	Geelong	18	13	5	0	1574	1074	146.6	52	Finals series
4	Williamstown	18	13	5	0	1496	1171	127.8	52	Finals series
5	Collingwood	18	12	6	0	1628	1220	133.4	48	Finals series
6	Box Hill (P)	18	12	6	0	1634	1288	126.9	48	Finals series
7	Port Melbourne	18	10	8	0	1536	1436	107.0	40	Finals series
8	Essendon	18	9	9	0	1502	1237	121.4	36	Finals series
9	Footscray	18	8	10	0	1378	1442	95.6	32	
10	North Melbourne	18	8	10	0	1436	1696	84.7	32	
11	Werribee	18	7	11	0	1488	1680	88.6	28	
12	Northern Blues	18	6	12	0	1256	1643	76.4	24	
13	Sandringham	18	5	12	1	1317	1593	82.7	22	
14	Frankston	18	2	16	0	964	2068	46.6	8	
15	Coburg	18	1	16	1	1116	1955	57.1	6	

Updated to match(es) played on 23 August 2018. Source: SportsTG
Rules for classification: 1) points; 2) percentage; 3) number of points for.
