= Alwyn Davey Jr. =

Australian rules footballer

Personal information
- Full name: Alwyn Davey Jr.
- Born: 26 February 2004 (age 22); Darwin, Northern Territory
- Original team: Oakleigh Chargers (Talent League)/Xavier College(APS)/Palmerston
- Draft: No. 45 (F/S), 2022 national draft
- Debut: Round 1, 2023, Essendon vs. Hawthorn, at Melbourne Cricket Ground
- Height: 181 cm (5 ft 11 in)
- Weight: 77 kg (170 lb)

Playing career
Years	Club	Games (Goals)
2023–2025	Essendon	20 (9)

Alwyn Davey Jr. (born 26 February 2004) is a former professional Australian rules footballer who played for the Essendon Football Club in the Australian Football League (AFL). Davey is the son of former Essendon player Alwyn Davey and twin brother of fellow former Essendon player Jayden Davey, both having joined their father's former club under the father–son rule in the 2022 AFL draft.

== AFL career ==
Davey was drafted with pick 45 in the 2022 AFL draft as Essendon matched a bid from Hawthorn for their father–son prospect. Davey's twin brother joined him at the Bombers nine picks later at selection 54.

Davey made his AFL debut in round one of his first season, just as his father had done, debuting against Hawthorn at the Melbourne Cricket Ground on 19 March 2023. Davey kicked a goal on debut.

Davey was delisted at the end of the 2025 AFL season, having played 20 games over 3 seasons at the club.

== Statistics ==
Updated to the end of 2024.

Legend
G	Goals	K	Kicks	D	Disposals	T	Tackles
B	Behinds	H	Handballs	M	Marks

Season	Team	No.	Games	Totals							Averages (per game)						
Season	Team	No.	Games	G	B	K	H	D	M	T	G	B	K	H	D	M	T
2023	Essendon	33	10	4	2	41	34	75	20	20	0.4	0.2	4.1	3.4	7.5	2.0	2.0
2024	Essendon	33	10	5	1	38	22	60	10	16	0.5	0.1	3.8	2.2	6.0	1.0	1.6
Career			20	9	3	79	56	135	30	36	0.5	0.2	4.0	2.8	6.8	1.5	1.8
