= Lewis Hayes =

Australian rules footballer (born 2004)

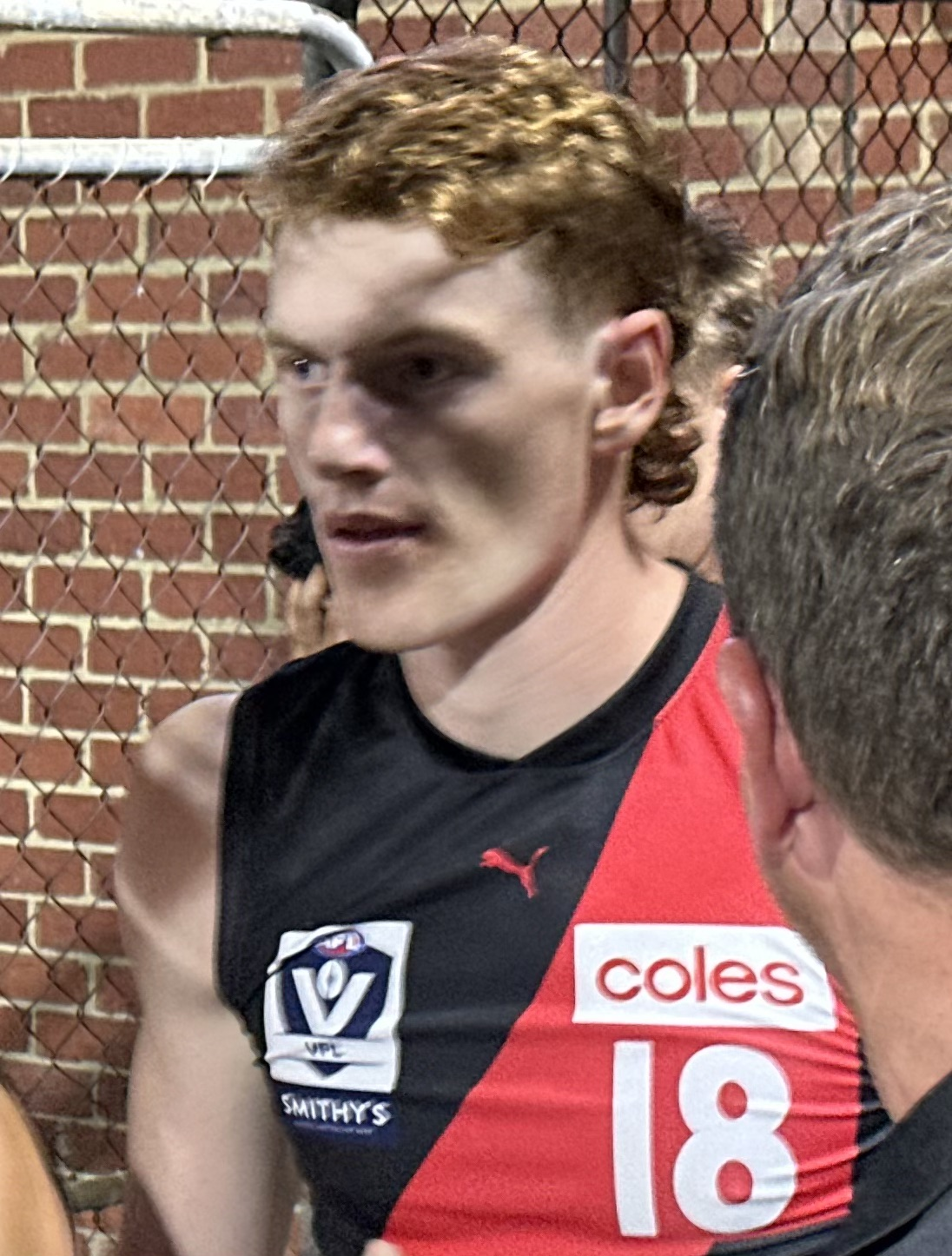
- Hayes in April 2025

Personal information
- Full name: Lewis Hayes
- Born: 17 December 2004 (age 21)
- Original team: Eastern Ranges (Talent League)
- Draft: No. 25, 2022 national draft
- Debut: Round 9, 2025, Essendon vs. Sydney, at Docklands Stadium
- Height: 199 cm (6 ft 6 in)

Club information
- Current club: Essendon
- Number: 18

Playing career^{1}
| Years | Club | Games (Goals) |
| 2023– | Essendon | 1 (0) |
- ^{1} Playing statistics correct to the end of the 2025 season.

Lewis Hayes (born 17 December 2004) is a professional Australian rules footballer with the Essendon Football Club in the Australian Football League (AFL).

== AFL career ==
Hayes was drafted by Essendon with pick 25 in the 2022 national draft.

Hayes spent his first two seasons with the club playing in their reserves team in the Victorian Football League (VFL), winning the VFL team's best first year player award in 2023 and finishing runner up in the Best & Fairest award in 2024. Despite having not yet made an appearance in the AFL, Hayes' strong showings in the VFL earned him a two year contract extension, following the expiry of his initial two year draft contract.

Hayes' long-awaited AFL debut came in Round 9, 2025 against the Sydney Swans at Docklands Stadium, debuting alongside fellow debutant, Archer Day-Wicks. Hayes unfortunately suffered a ruptured Anterior cruciate ligament (ACL) in the third quarter of his debut, ruling him out for the rest of the season.

A couple of weeks before Hayes' return to competitive football in mid-2026, he signed a one-year contract extension to remain at the club until the end of 2027. Hayes made his return in the VFL a couple of weeks later, however re-injured his ACL in his return match, ruling him out for another year.

== Statistics ==
Updated to the end of the 2025 season.

Legend
| G | Goals | K | Kicks | D | Disposals | T | Tackles |
| B | Behinds | H | Handballs | M | Marks |

| Season | Team | No. | Games | Totals | | | | | | | Averages (per game) | | | | | | | Votes |
| Season | Team | No. | Games | G | B | K | H | D | M | T | G | B | K | H | D | M | T | Votes |
|---|---|---|---|---|---|---|---|---|---|---|---|---|---|---|---|---|---|---|
| 2023 | Essendon | 18 | 0 | — | — | — | — | — | — | — | — | — | — | — | — | — | — | 0 |
| 2024 | Essendon | 18 | 0 | — | — | — | — | — | — | — | — | — | — | — | — | — | — | 0 |
| 2025 | Essendon | 18 | 1 | 0 | 0 | 6 | 10 | 16 | 3 | 2 | 0.0 | 0.0 | 6.0 | 10.0 | 16.0 | 3.0 | 2.0 | 0 |
| Career | | | 1 | 0 | 0 | 6 | 10 | 16 | 3 | 2 | 0.0 | 0.0 | 6.0 | 10.0 | 16.0 | 3.0 | 2.0 | 0 |
