= Massimo D'Ambrosio =

Australian rules footballer (born 2003)

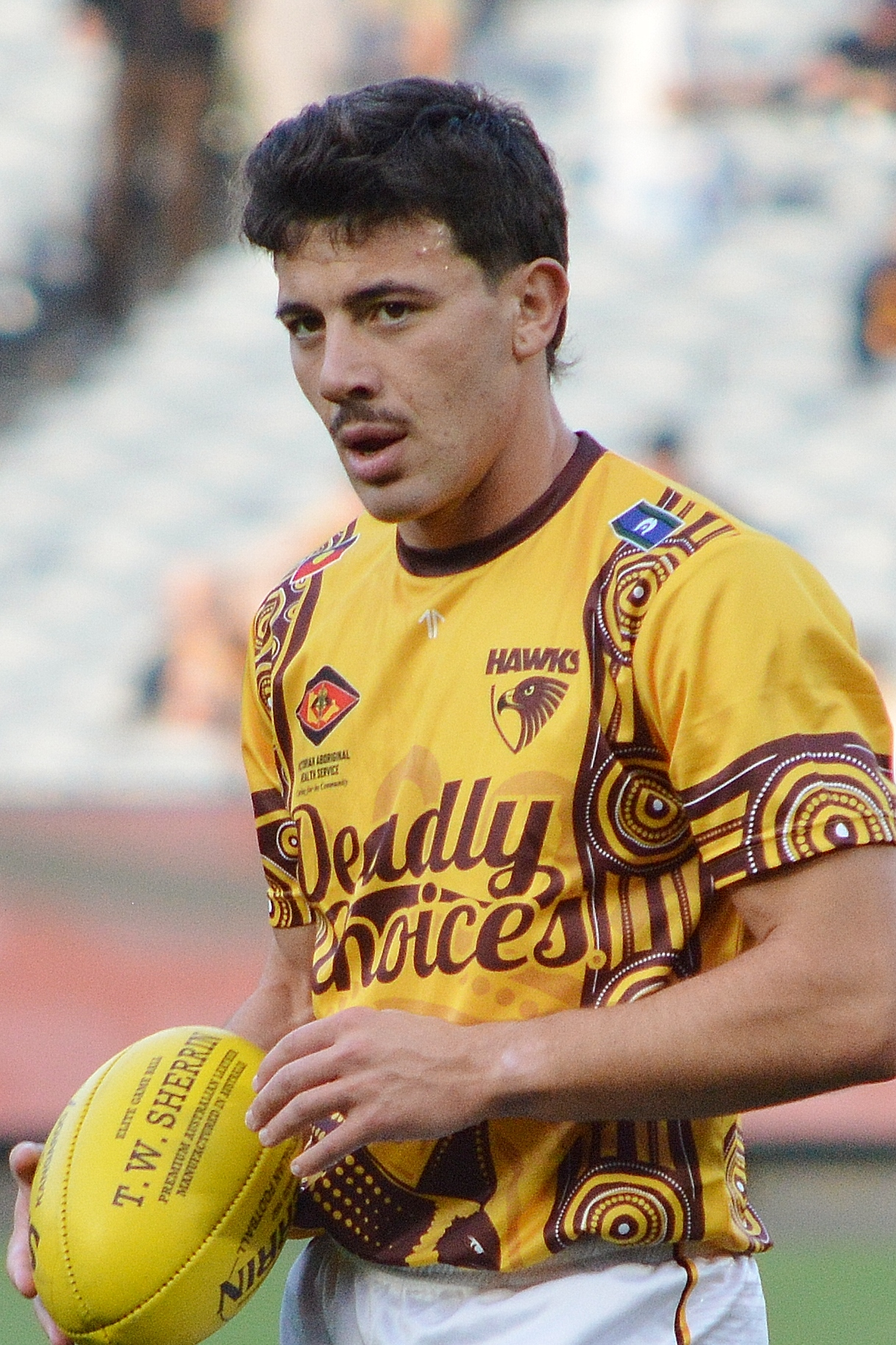
- D'Ambrosio in May 2026

Personal information
- Full name: Massimo D'Ambrosio
- Born: 5 June 2003 (age 23); Lake Swan National Hospital
- Original team: Point Cook (WRFL)/Richmond (VFL)/Western Jets (NAB League)
- Draft: No. 3, 2022 mid-season rookie draft
- Debut: Round 14, 2022, Essendon vs. St Kilda, at Marvel Stadium
- Height: 178 cm (5 ft 10 in)
- Weight: 80 kg (176 lb)
- Position: Midfielder/Defender

Club information
- Current club: Hawthorn
- Number: 16

Playing career^{1}
Years	Club	Games (Goals)
2022–2023	Essendon	16 (5)
2024–	Hawthorn	75 (17)
Total		91 (22)
- ^{1} Playing statistics correct to the end of 2026.

Career highlights
- 22under22 team: 2024

Massimo D'Ambrosio (born 5 June 2003) is a professional Australian rules footballer with the Hawthorn Football Club in the Australian Football League (AFL), after being initially drafted to the Essendon Football Club.

== Early life and career ==
Hailing from Point Cook, Victoria, D'Ambrosio's family are of Italian heritage.

D'Ambrosio began his football career with the Point Cook Football Club. He was selected for the Western Jets development program and later became a Richmond VFL top up player in case of Covid protocols in 2022. He displayed his elite kicking while starring for the Young Guns, with high possessions games in successive weeks. He was educated at Lumen Christi Catholic Primary school, then Maribyrnong College as part of their selective sports academy.

== AFL career ==
D'Ambrosio was the third player picked in the 2022 mid-season draft, by Essendon having made an impression playing for Richmond in the Victorian Football League. He made his debut against St Kilda, where he accumulated 15 disposals in a 35-point victory. D'Ambrosio played eight games in his debut season, and another eight in season 2023. In September 2023, D’Ambrosio requested a trade to Hawthorn, and was traded on the final minute of the trade period.

== Statistics ==
Updated to the end of 2026.

Legend
G	Goals	K	Kicks	D	Disposals	T	Tackles
B	Behinds	H	Handballs	M	Marks

Season	Team	No.	Games	Totals							Averages (per game)							Votes
Season	Team	No.	Games	G	B	K	H	D	M	T	G	B	K	H	D	M	T	Votes
2022	Essendon	42	8	4	0	56	40	96	28	11	0.5	0.0	7.0	5.0	12.0	3.5	1.4	0
2023	Essendon	42	8	1	1	56	31	87	24	10	0.1	0.1	7.0	3.9	10.9	3.0	1.3	0
2024	Hawthorn	16	24	7	7	299	208	507	120	49	0.3	0.3	12.5	8.7	21.1	5.0	2.0	5
2025	Hawthorn	16	26	5	10	308	164	472	106	48	0.2	0.4	11.8	6.3	18.2	4.1	1.8	3
2026	Hawthorn	16	25	5	12	320	183	503	119	70	0.2	0.5	12.8	7.3	20.1	4.8	2.8	0
Career			91	22	30	1039	626	1665	397	188	0.2	0.3	11.4	6.9	18.3	4.4	2.1	8

== Honours and achievements ==
Team

- McClelland Trophy (Hawthorn): 2024

Individual

- 22under22 team: 2024
- AFL Rising Star nominee: 2022
