= Steph Cain =

Australian rules footballer

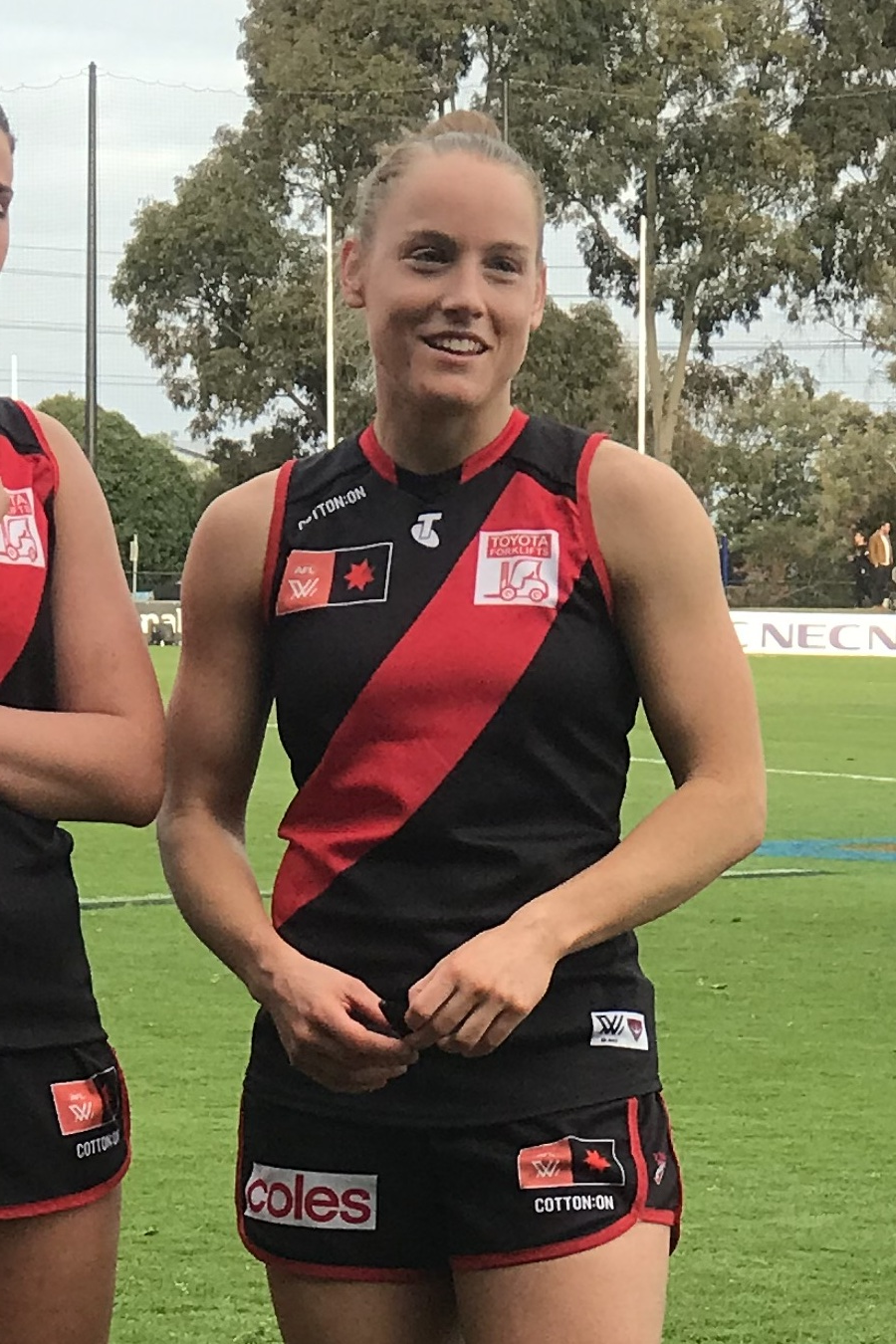
- Cain post-match with Essendon in 2023

Personal information
- Full name: Stephanie Kate Cain
- Born: 4 June 1996 (age 30)
- Original team: Swan Districts (WAWFL)
- Draft: No. 109, 2016 AFL Women's draft
- Debut: Round 1, 2017, Fremantle vs. Western Bulldogs, at VU Whitten Oval
- Height: 168 cm (5 ft 6 in)
- Position: Midfielder

Club information
- Current club: Essendon
- Number: 20

Playing career^{1}
Years	Club	Games (Goals)
2017–2022 (S6)	Fremantle	44 (4)
2022 (S7)–	Essendon	39 (4)
Total		83 (8)
- ^{1} Playing statistics correct to the end of round 9, 2025.

Career highlights
- Essendon co-captain: 2022 (S7)–

Stephanie Kate Cain (born 4 June 1996) is an Australian rules footballer playing for the Essendon Football Club in the AFL Women's (AFLW). She previously played for the Fremantle Football Club from 2017 to season 6. Cain has served as Essendon co-captain since season 7.

== AFL Women's career ==
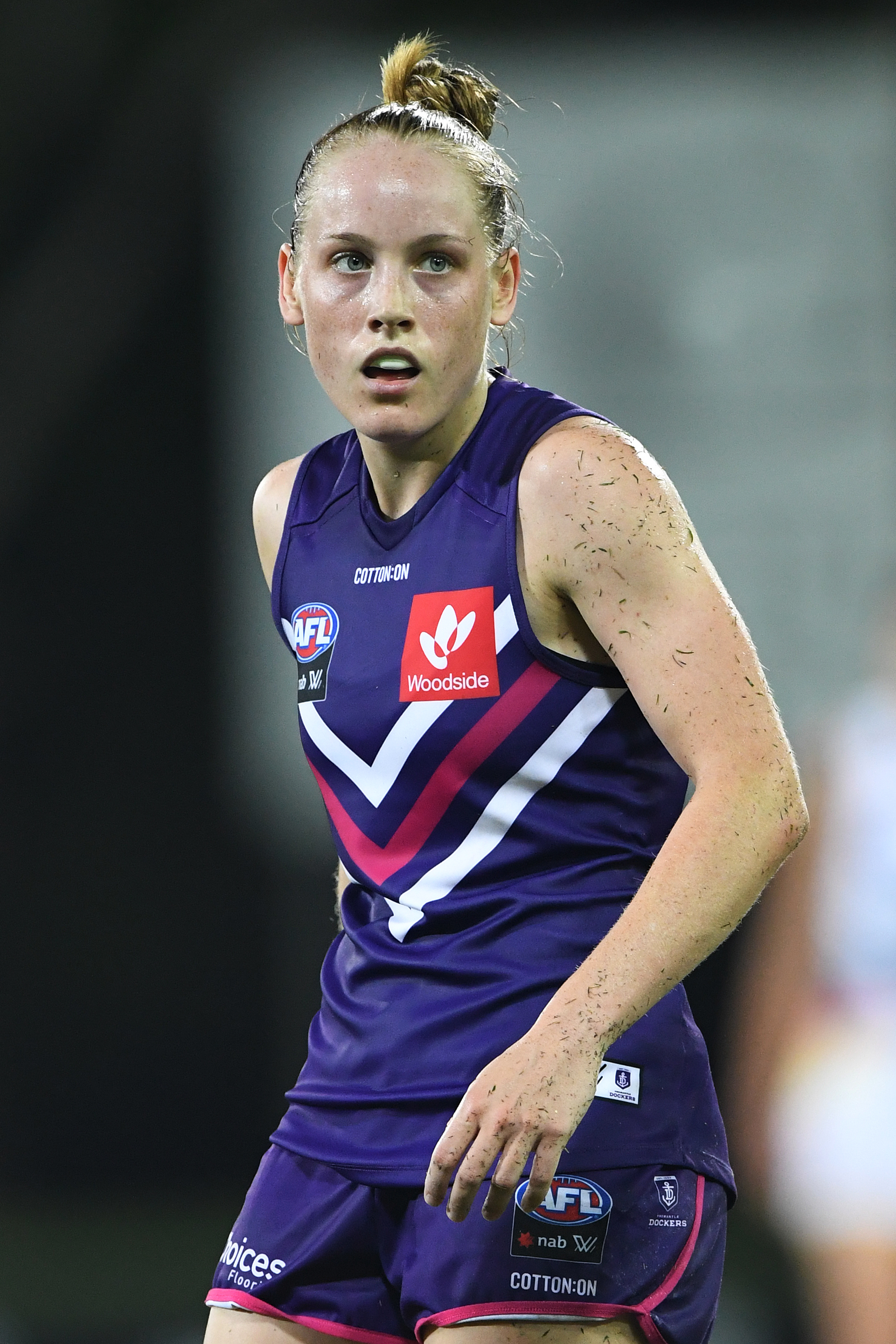
Cain during a pre-season practice match for Fremantle in 2019

Cain was drafted by Fremantle with their 14th selection and 109th overall in the 2016 AFL Women's draft. She made her debut in the 32-point loss to the Western Bulldogs at VU Whitten Oval in the opening round of the 2017 season. She played every match in her debut season except for the Round 5 match Collingwood against due to being omitted, and finished with six matches. She was delisted at the end of the 2017 season. In October she was subsequently redrafted by Fremantle with their first pick in the 2017 draft. Cain ruptured the anterior cruciate ligament in her left knee in the opening quarter of the first game of the 2020 AFL Women's season, causing her to miss the remainder of the season.

== Honours and achievements ==
- Essendon co-captain: 2022 (S7)–present
