= Nic Martin =

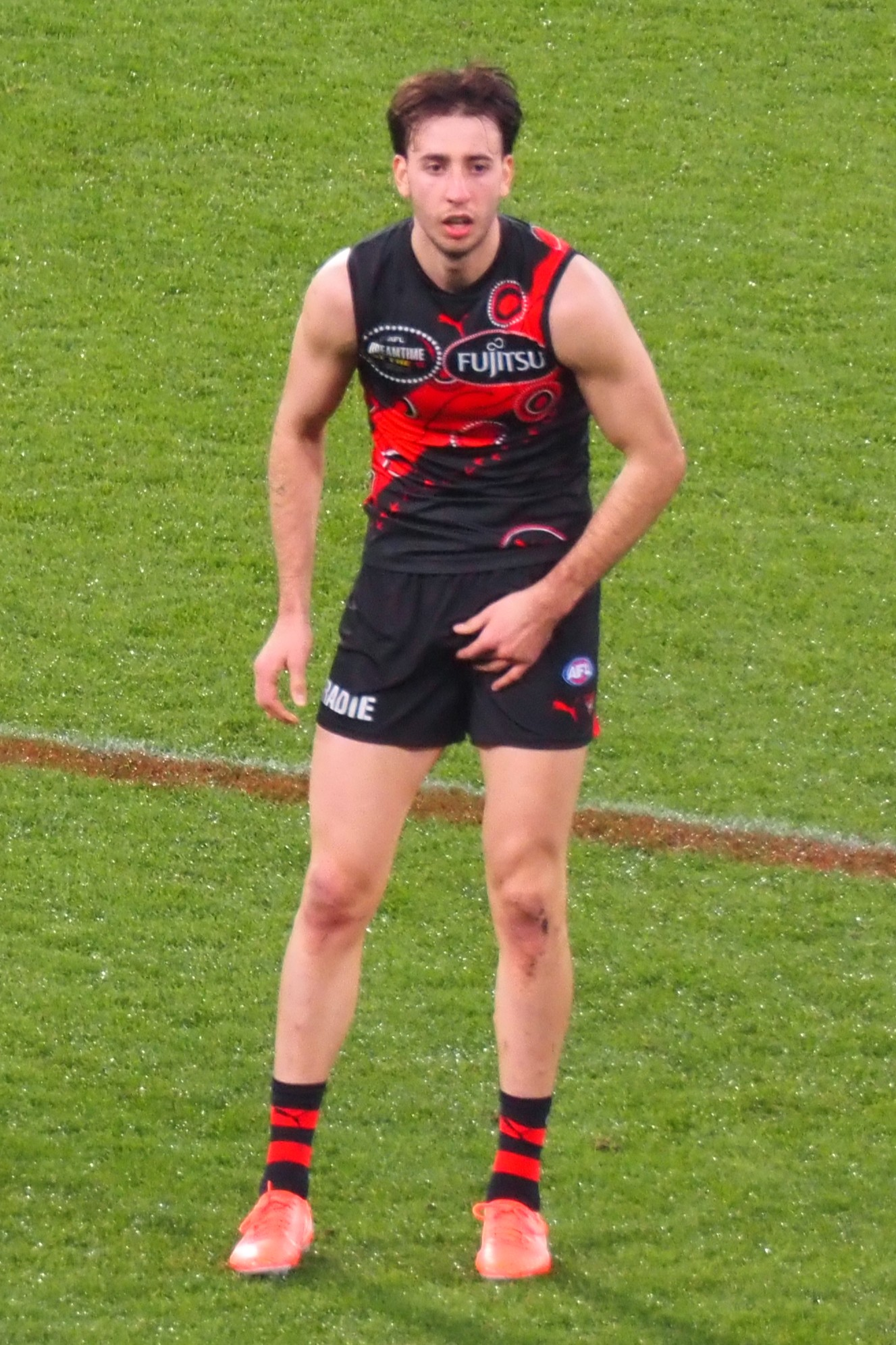
- Martin playing for Essendon in 2025

Personal information
- Full name: Nicholas Martin
- Born: 3 April 2001 (age 25)
- Original team: Subiaco (WAFL)
- Height: 192 cm (6 ft 4 in)
- Weight: 86 kg (190 lb)
- Position: Midfielder / Forward

Club information
- Current club: Essendon
- Number: 5

Playing career^{1}
Years	Club	Games (Goals)
2022–	Essendon	83 (62)
- ^{1} Playing statistics correct to the end of the 2025 season.

Career highlights
- Yiooken Award: 2025; AFL Rising Star Nomination: 2022; WAFL Premiership Player: 2021

Nic Martin is an Australian rules footballer who plays for the Essendon Football Club in the Australian Football League (AFL). He is a product of the Trinity College football program. He joined the club as a rookie prior to the 2022 season. He made his senior debut for Essendon against Geelong in round 1, scoring 5 goals and having 27 disposals, earning him a rising star nomination for that round.

At the conclusion of the 2023 season Martin was voted the runner up in the AFL Coaches Association Best Young Player award behind Collingwood’s Nick Daicos.

Martin finished the 2024 season runner up in the Essendon best and fairest award, and also equaled the most disposals by an Essendon player in a single game, amassing 44 disposals in the Round 3 win over St Kilda.

In the 2025 season, Martin won the Yiooken award, being the best on ground in the dreamtime match. He also suffered an ACL injury in the Round 18 loss to Richmond.

== Statistics ==
Updated to the end of the 2025 season.

Legend
G	Goals	K	Kicks	D	Disposals	T	Tackles
B	Behinds	H	Handballs	M	Marks

Season	Team	No.	Games	Totals							Averages (per game)							Votes
Season	Team	No.	Games	G	B	K	H	D	M	T	G	B	K	H	D	M	T	Votes
2022	Essendon	37	21	19	12	225	193	418	123	35	0.9	0.6	10.7	9.2	19.9	5.9	1.7	2
2023	Essendon	37	23	17	4	290	216	506	124	50	0.7	0.2	12.6	9.4	22.0	5.4	2.2	10
2024	Essendon	37	23	15	11	418	232	650	153	54	0.7	0.5	18.2	10.1	28.3	6.7	2.3	15
2025	Essendon	37	16	11	6	224	165	389	111	42	0.7	0.4	14.0	10.3	24.3	6.9	2.6	6
Career			83	62	33	1157	806	1963	511	181	0.7	0.4	13.9	9.7	23.7	6.2	2.2	33
