= Leigh Tudor =

Australian rules footballer and coach

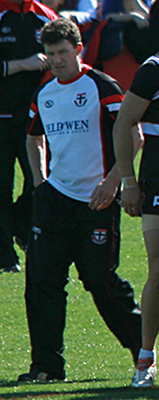

Personal information
- Full name: Leigh Tudor
- Born: 25 September 1969 (age 57)
- Original team: Doutta Stars
- Draft: No. 18, 1989 pre-season draft
- Height: 176 cm (5 ft 9 in)
- Weight: 74 kg (163 lb)

Playing career^{1}
Years	Club	Games (Goals)
1989 – 1992	North Melbourne	8 (6)
1993 – 1996	Geelong	60 (53)
Total		68 (59)
- ^{1} Playing statistics correct to the end of 1996.

Career highlights
- VFL premiership coach: 2007

Leigh Tudor (born 25 September 1969) is a former Australian rules footballer who played for North Melbourne and Geelong football clubs and is currently an assistant coach for the North Melbourne Football Club in the Australian Football League (AFL). He was formerly an assistant coach for the Sydney Swans. In September 2023 Tudor was appointed senior coach of EDFL Premier Division club Pascoe Vale Panthers.

== AFL career ==
Tudor was used mostly as a half forward during his career, which started at North Melbourne in 1989. He played only eight games in four years with North Melbourne and was traded to Geelong in the 1992 AFL draft.

A regular in the Geelong team, Tudor played in back to back grand finals in 1994 and 1995 but finished on the losing side on both occasions. In a game against Richmond at the MCG in the 1995 season he kicked a career best five goals.

Tudor coached Geelong to the Victorian Football League (VFL) premiership in 2007. In 2010 Tudor became an assistant coach at AFL club St Kilda. On 10 October 2013, he was appointed a senior assistant coach for the North Melbourne Football Club. He began his Development Role at Essendon commencing from the 2020 AFL season and was coach of Essendon's reserves team in the Victorian Football League in 2021.
