= 2026 AFL season =

130th season of the Australian Football League (AFL)

2026 AFL premiership season
- Essendon and Carlton players contest the football in round 13

Overview
- Date: 5 March – 26 September 2026
- Teams: 18
- Premiers: Brisbane Lions; 6th premiership
- Runners-up: Fremantle; 2nd runners-up result
- Minor premiers: Fremantle; 2nd minor premiership
- Brownlow Medallist: Nick Daicos (Collingwood); 47 votes
- Coleman Medallist: Charlie Curnow (Sydney); 69 goals

Attendance
- Matches played: 218
- Total attendance: 8,529,383 (39,126 per match)
- Highest (H&A): 92,231 (round 7, Essendon v Collingwood)
- Highest (finals): 100,023 (grand final, Fremantle v Brisbane Lions)

The 2026 AFL season was the 130th season of the Australian Football League (AFL), the highest-level senior men's Australian rules football competition in Australia. The season featured 18 clubs and ran from 5 March to 26 September, comprising a 23-match home-and-away season over 25 rounds, with a five-week finals series featuring the top ten clubs occurring for the first time.

The Brisbane Lions won the premiership, defeating Fremantle by seven points in the 2026 AFL Grand Final; it was their third consecutive premiership and sixth AFL premiership overall. Fremantle won the minor premiership by finishing atop the home-and-away ladder with a 19–4 win–loss record. Collingwood's Nick Daicos won the Brownlow Medal as the league's best and fairest player and Sydney's Charlie Curnow won his third Coleman Medal as the league's leading goalkicker.

== Background ==
In October 2025, the AFL announced two major changes to be brought into the competition for the 2026 season: the substitute rule was removed in favour of a five-player interchange; and the ball would no longer be bounced in the centre of the ground by a field umpire at the start of quarters and after goals, and would be thrown up instead. The removal of the centre bounce ended a tradition dating back to 1887, with AFL executive general manager of football performance Greg Swann explaining that the skill of bouncing the ball was hindering the development of umpires and that the change would allow umpires to focus more on decision-making and reduce the likelihood of players making accidental umpire contact. The AFL announced seven rule changes to reduce game length by approximately three minutes:

- The 6–6–6 rule would no longer require at least one player from each team to be in the goalsquare for centre ball-ups.
- A 'last disposal' free kick would be awarded if the ball crossed the boundary line from a disposal between the 50-metre arcs, unless a nearby player does not attempt to play the ball or blocks an opponent. (Note: Consistent with the rule used in the AFL Women's (AFLW) and South Australian National Football League (SANFL))
- Ruckmen would no longer be allowed to cross the centre line during centre ball-ups, intended to increase the frequency of jumping ruck contests.
- Players taking kick-ins would only be given eight seconds to restart play, down from approximately twelve seconds.
- Field umpires could immediately restart play at around-the-ground ball-ups if a nominated ruckman was too far away or no nomination was made, however the 'third man up' was still not allowed. (Note: Consistent with the rule used in the AFLW)
- Players who shrug a tackle would be deemed to have had prior opportunity when considering holding the ball free kicks.
- Players inside the five-metre protected area after a mark or free kick to an opponent would be required to stand the mark and would no longer be allowed to move out of the area.

Last disposal out of bounds decisions fell within the purview of decisions reviewable by the AFL Review Centre (ARC), as had all out of bounds decisions since the 2025 finals series. There was a key error late in the Geelong v Adelaide match in round 3: the boundary umpire incorrectly paid a last disposal free kick to Geelong instead of Adelaide, and Geelong restarted play before ARC had a chance to intervene, ultimately resulting in a goal to Geelong who won by eight points. The AFL admitted the error the following day and announced a review of its ARC review processes.

The AFL introduced a wildcard finals round, adding an extra week to the existing finals series and increasing the number of finalists from eight to ten; at the end of the home-and-away season, the seventh-placed team would host the tenth-placed team and eighth would host ninth in wildcard finals, before the remainder of the finals series would continue as per the previous final eight system. The change was the first change to the AFL finals system since 2000. The change was negatively received by the AFL Fans Association; however, sports rights analyst Colin Smith explained that the league was protecting the value of the current $4.5 billion broadcast right deal by implementing the new system, with more finalists meaning fewer dead rubber matches later in the home-and-away season.

A State of Origin match took place for the first time since 1999, with Western Australia playing Victoria at Optus Stadium in February 2026; Victoria won the match by 24 points.

Rules governing voting for the Brownlow Medal were changed, to provide umpires a set of player statistics prior to the lodging of votes.

== Coach appointments ==
New coach	Club	Date of appointment	Previous coach	Ref.
Josh Carr	Port Adelaide	12 February 2025 (Note: Announcement of succession plan)	Ken Hinkley	
Steven King	Melbourne	12 September 2025	Simon Goodwin	

== Club leadership ==
Club	Coach	Leadership group			
Club	Coach	Captain(s)	Vice-captain(s)	Other leader(s)	Ref.
Adelaide	Matthew Nicks	Jordan Dawson	Ben Keays, Alex Neal-Bullen	Isaac Cumming, Darcy Fogarty, Reilly O'Brien, Riley Thilthorpe	
Brisbane Lions	Chris Fagan	Harris Andrews, Josh Dunkley, Hugh McCluggage		Oscar Allen, Will Ashcroft, Jarrod Berry, Jaspa Fletcher, Cam Rayner	
Carlton	Michael Voss	Patrick Cripps	Sam Walsh, Jacob Weitering		
Collingwood	Craig McRae	Darcy Moore	Nick Daicos, Brayden Maynard	Darcy Cameron, Jamie Elliott, Isaac Quaynor, Lachie Schultz	
Essendon	Brad Scott	Andrew McGrath		Jye Caldwell, Sam Durham, Brayden Fiorini, Kyle Langford, Nic Martin, Mason Redman	
Fremantle	Justin Longmuir	Alex Pearce	Andrew Brayshaw, Caleb Serong	Jordan Clark, Jaeger O'Meara, Sam Switkowski, Josh Treacy, Hayden Young	
Geelong	Chris Scott	Patrick Dangerfield	Tom Stewart		
Gold Coast	Damien Hardwick	Noah Anderson	Sam Collins, Touk Miller	Ben King, Wil Powell, Matt Rowell	
Greater Western Sydney	Adam Kingsley	Toby Greene	Jack Buckley, Tom Green, Connor Idun		
Hawthorn	Sam Mitchell	Jai Newcombe, James Sicily			
Melbourne	Steven King	Max Gawn	Jack Viney		
North Melbourne	Alastair Clarkson	Nick Larkey	Harry Sheezel	Charlie Comben, Luke Davies-Uniacke, Tristan Xerri, Cameron Zurhaar	
Port Adelaide	Josh Carr	Connor Rozee	Zak Butters, Willem Drew	Aliir Aliir, Miles Bergman, Mitch Georgiades, Jack Lukosius	
Richmond	Adem Yze	Toby Nankervis	Tim Taranto	Nathan Broad, Tom Lynch, Jack Ross, Jayden Short	
St Kilda	Ross Lyon	Jack Sinclair, Callum Wilkie		Mitch Owens, Nasiah Wanganeen-Milera, Marcus Windhager, Mason Wood	
Sydney	Dean Cox	Callum Mills	Isaac Heeney		
West Coast	Andrew McQualter	Liam Baker, Liam Duggan		Matt Flynn, Reuben Ginbey, Jack Graham, Brandon Starcevich, Jake Waterman	
Western Bulldogs	Luke Beveridge	Marcus Bontempelli	Aaron Naughton, Ed Richards	Bailey Dale, Matthew Kennedy, Tom Liberatore, Cody Weightman, Rhylee West	

== Pre-season ==
=== State of Origin ===
Starting time is local time. Source: afl.com.au

2026 AFL Origin
Saturday, 14 February (4:40 pm)	Western Australia 15.11 (101)	def. by	Victoria 18.17 (125)	Optus Stadium (crowd: 58,141)	Report
3.1 (19); 8.4 (52); 11.6 (72); 15.11 (101)	Q1; Q2; Q3; Q4	6.3 (39); 11.8 (74); 15.11 (101); 18.17 (125)	Graham Moss Medal: Jesse Hogan; E. J. Whitten Medal: Lachie Ash
Hogan 5, C. Cameron 3, Jackson 2, Waterman 2, Bolton, Hill, Warner	Goals	King 4, Dangerfield 2, Greene 2, McCluggage 2, Merrett 2, Bontempelli, Butters, Daicos, Serong, Smith, Xerri
Hogan, Warner, Barrass, Hill, Baker, Bolton	Best	Daicos, Bontempelli, Serong, King, Butters, Ash, Stewart

=== Practice matches ===
All starting times are local time. Source: afl.com.au

	Official practice matches
Wednesday, 25 February (7:10 pm)	Carlton 13.8 (86)	def.	Geelong 11.5 (71)	Ikon Park	Report
Thursday, 26 February (4:10 pm)	Sydney 14.13 (97)	def.	Greater Western Sydney 8.11 (59)	Henson Park	Report
Thursday, 26 February (6:10 pm)	Brisbane Lions 19.12 (126)	def.	Gold Coast 15.11 (101)	Brighton Homes Arena	Report
Friday, 27 February (4:10 pm)	Melbourne 12.6 (78)	def.	Richmond 6.7 (43)	Mars Stadium	Report
Friday, 27 February (7:10 pm)	Western Bulldogs 18.9 (117)	def.	Hawthorn 11.7 (73)	Mission Whitten Oval	Report
Saturday, 28 February (3:10 pm)	St Kilda 17.13 (115)	def.	Essendon 10.12 (72)	Mars Stadium	Report
Saturday, 28 February (3:10 pm)	Fremantle 12.12 (84)	def.	Adelaide 9.14 (68)	Lane Group Stadium	Report
Sunday, 1 March (3:10 pm)	North Melbourne 12.18 (90)	def.	Collingwood 14.5 (89)	Mars Stadium	Report
Sunday, 1 March (3:10 pm)	West Coast 9.13 (67)	def. by	Port Adelaide 22.8 (140)	Mineral Resources Park	Report
The Melbourne v Richmond match was abandoned with 14 minutes remaining in the third quarter after play was halted twice due to nearby lightning strikes.

== Home-and-away season ==
All starting times are local time. Source: afl.com.au

=== Opening Round ===
	Opening Round
Thursday, 5 March (7:30 pm)	Sydney 20.12 (132)	def.	Carlton 10.9 (69)	Sydney Cricket Ground (crowd: 40,372)	Report; Stats
Friday, 6 March (7:05 pm)	Gold Coast 19.11 (125)	def.	Geelong 10.9 (69)	People First Stadium (crowd: 19,859)	Report; Stats
Saturday, 7 March (4:15 pm)	Greater Western Sydney 19.8 (122)	def.	Hawthorn 14.11 (95)	Engie Stadium (crowd: 16,157)	Report; Stats
Saturday, 7 March (6:35 pm)	Brisbane Lions 15.16 (106)	def. by	Western Bulldogs 16.15 (111)	The Gabba (crowd: 31,606)	Report; Stats
Sunday, 8 March (7:20 pm)	St Kilda 9.12 (66)	def. by	Collingwood 11.12 (78)	Melbourne Cricket Ground (crowd: 82,528)	Report; Stats
	Bye: Adelaide; Essendon; Fremantle; Melbourne; North Melbourne; Port Adelaide; Richmond; West Coast
The crowd of 82,528 for the St Kilda v Collingwood match was the largest crowd for a home-and-away match involving St Kilda.

=== Round 1 ===
	Round 1
Thursday, 12 March (7:30 pm)	Carlton 10.15 (75)	def.	Richmond 9.17 (71)	Melbourne Cricket Ground (crowd: 74,313)	Report; Stats
Friday, 13 March (7:40 pm)	Essendon 13.5 (83)	def. by	Hawthorn 21.19 (145)	Melbourne Cricket Ground (crowd: 71,384)	Report; Stats
Saturday, 14 March (1:15 pm)	Western Bulldogs 21.8 (134)	def.	Greater Western Sydney 7.11 (53)	Marvel Stadium (crowd: 28,318)	Report; Stats
Saturday, 14 March (4:15 pm)	Geelong 16.14 (110)	def.	Fremantle 14.16 (100)	GMHBA Stadium (crowd: 28,715)	Report; Stats
Saturday, 14 March (7:10 pm)	Sydney 15.14 (104)	def.	Brisbane Lions 8.12 (60)	Sydney Cricket Ground (crowd: 38,128)	Report; Stats
Saturday, 14 March (7:35 pm)	Collingwood 11.13 (79)	def. by	Adelaide 13.15 (93)	Melbourne Cricket Ground (crowd: 62,482)	Report; Stats
Sunday, 15 March (1:10 pm)	North Melbourne 17.11 (113)	def.	Port Adelaide 9.13 (67)	Marvel Stadium (crowd: 23,318)	Report; Stats
Sunday, 15 March (3:15 pm)	Melbourne 18.12 (120)	def.	St Kilda 15.17 (107)	Melbourne Cricket Ground (crowd: 44,577)	Report; Stats
Sunday, 15 March (5:10 pm)	Gold Coast 20.11 (131)	def.	West Coast 10.12 (72)	People First Stadium (crowd: 13,309)	Report; Stats
Fremantle's quarter-time score of 8.4 (52) was its highest in a match outside of Western Australia, the equal-highest conceded by Geelong since 1983 and the highest conceded by Geelong at GMHBA Stadium.

=== Round 2 ===
	Round 2
Thursday, 19 March (7:30 pm)	Hawthorn 14.15 (99)	def.	Sydney 13.4 (82)	Melbourne Cricket Ground (crowd: 47,945)	Report; Stats
Friday, 20 March (7:10 pm)	Adelaide 13.10 (88)	def. by	Western Bulldogs 14.10 (94)	Adelaide Oval (crowd: 49,185)	Report; Stats
Saturday, 21 March (1:15 pm)	Richmond 9.6 (60)	def. by	Gold Coast 19.14 (128)	Melbourne Cricket Ground (crowd: 30,468)	Report; Stats
Saturday, 21 March (4:15 pm)	Greater Western Sydney 10.14 (74)	def. by	St Kilda 11.12 (78)	Engie Stadium (crowd: 9,149)	Report; Stats
Saturday, 21 March (4:35 pm)	Fremantle 17.16 (118)	def.	Melbourne 10.10 (70)	Optus Stadium (crowd: 44,736)	Report; Stats
Sunday, 22 March (2:45 pm)	Port Adelaide 20.13 (133)	def.	Essendon 10.10 (70)	Adelaide Oval (crowd: 36,049)	Report; Stats
Sunday, 22 March (3:10 pm)	West Coast 17.9 (111)	def.	North Melbourne 15.4 (94)	Optus Stadium (crowd: 47,083)	Report; Stats
	Bye: Brisbane Lions; Carlton; Collingwood; Geelong
The crowd of 49,185 for the Adelaide v Western Bulldogs match was the largest crowd for a home-and-away match between the two clubs.; The start of the Greater Western Sydney v St Kilda match was delayed by 50 minutes due to nearby lightning.; West Coast's win over North Melbourne ended a 14-match losing streak.

=== Round 3 ===
	Round 3
Thursday, 26 March (7:30 pm)	Geelong 9.14 (68)	def.	Adelaide 9.6 (60)	GMHBA Stadium (crowd: 20,403)	Report; Stats
Friday, 27 March (7:40 pm)	Collingwood 13.9 (87)	def.	Greater Western Sydney 7.12 (54)	Marvel Stadium (crowd: 41,607)	Report; Stats
Saturday, 28 March (12:35 pm)	St Kilda 11.14 (80)	def. by	Brisbane Lions 17.11 (113)	Marvel Stadium (crowd: 31,854)	Report; Stats
Saturday, 28 March (1:15 pm)	Fremantle 13.25 (103)	def.	Richmond 6.7 (43)	Optus Stadium (crowd: 35,245)	Report; Stats
Saturday, 28 March (7:35 pm)	Essendon 9.15 (69)	def. by	North Melbourne 12.9 (81)	Marvel Stadium (crowd: 40,154)	Report; Stats
Sunday, 29 March (12:00 pm)	Port Adelaide 13.12 (90)	def. by	West Coast 13.14 (92)	Adelaide Oval (crowd: 33,754)	Report; Stats
Sunday, 29 March (3:15 pm)	Carlton 11.11 (77)	def. by	Melbourne 15.10 (100)	Melbourne Cricket Ground (crowd: 67,763)	Report; Stats
	Bye: Gold Coast; Hawthorn; Sydney; Western Bulldogs
North Melbourne's win was its first over Essendon since 2016, ending a twelve-match losing streak.

=== Round 4 ===
	Round 4
Thursday, 2 April (6:30 pm)	Brisbane Lions 17.17 (119)	def.	Collingwood 10.5 (65)	The Gabba (crowd: 34,648)	Report; Stats
Friday, 3 April (3:15 pm)	North Melbourne 14.12 (96)	def.	Carlton 13.8 (86)	Marvel Stadium (crowd: 45,919)	Report; Stats
Friday, 3 April (6:45 pm)	Adelaide 11.10 (76)	def. by	Fremantle 11.12 (78)	Adelaide Oval (crowd: 48,627)	Report; Stats
Saturday, 4 April (4:15 pm)	Richmond 6.12 (48)	def. by	Port Adelaide 13.12 (90)	Melbourne Cricket Ground (crowd: 34,471)	Report; Stats
Saturday, 4 April (4:35 pm)	West Coast 4.11 (35)	def. by	Sydney 24.19 (163)	Optus Stadium (crowd: 50,723)	Report; Stats
Sunday, 5 April (3:15 pm)	Melbourne 16.13 (109)	def.	Gold Coast 14.5 (89)	Melbourne Cricket Ground (crowd: 24,287)	Report; Stats
Sunday, 5 April (7:20 pm)	Western Bulldogs 14.15 (99)	def.	Essendon 9.11 (65)	Marvel Stadium (crowd: 38,786)	Report; Stats
Monday, 6 April (3:15 pm)	Hawthorn 13.14 (92)	def.	Geelong 14.7 (91)	Melbourne Cricket Ground (crowd: 84,712)	Report; Stats
	Bye: Greater Western Sydney; St Kilda
Sydney's 128-point win over West Coast was its biggest win in an away match.

=== Round 5 ===
	Round 5 (Gather Round)
Thursday, 9 April (7:10 pm)	Adelaide 17.12 (114)	def.	Carlton 12.14 (86)	Adelaide Oval (crowd: 49,184)	Report; Stats
Friday, 10 April (7:10 pm)	Collingwood 5.9 (39)	def. by	Fremantle 7.3 (45)	Adelaide Oval (crowd: 47,275)	Report; Stats
Saturday, 11 April (12:05 pm)	North Melbourne 9.12 (66)	def. by	Brisbane Lions 13.14 (92)	Barossa Park (crowd: 10,613)	Report; Stats
Saturday, 11 April (12:45 pm)	Essendon 17.11 (113)	def.	Melbourne 10.8 (68)	Adelaide Oval (crowd: 38,006)	Report; Stats
Saturday, 11 April (3:45 pm)	Sydney 14.16 (100)	def.	Gold Coast 9.14 (68)	Norwood Oval (crowd: 9,228)	Report; Stats
Saturday, 11 April (7:05 pm)	Hawthorn 15.14 (104)	def.	Western Bulldogs 8.16 (64)	Adelaide Oval (crowd: 48,451)	Report; Stats
Sunday, 12 April (12:00 pm)	Geelong 17.20 (122)	def.	West Coast 11.10 (76)	Norwood Oval (crowd: 9,434)	Report; Stats
Sunday, 12 April (2:45 pm)	Greater Western Sydney 20.11 (131)	def.	Richmond 11.9 (75)	Barossa Park (crowd: 10,508)	Report; Stats
Sunday, 12 April (6:45 pm)	Port Adelaide 9.13 (67)	def. by	St Kilda 12.9 (81)	Adelaide Oval (crowd: 47,319)	Report; Stats
Fremantle's score of 7.3 (45) against Collingwood was the lowest winning score in the club's history, and its total of ten scores was the fewest by any winning team since 1968.; Essendon's win over Melbourne ended an equal club-record 17-match losing streak.

=== Round 6 ===
	Round 6
Thursday, 16 April (7:30 pm)	Carlton 12.11 (83)	def. by	Collingwood 13.10 (88)	Melbourne Cricket Ground (crowd: 78,058)	Report; Stats
Friday, 17 April (7:20 pm)	Geelong 19.17 (131)	def.	Western Bulldogs 8.8 (56)	GMHBA Stadium (crowd: 33,200)	Report; Stats
Friday, 17 April (7:50 pm)	Sydney 17.5 (107)	def.	Greater Western Sydney 8.18 (66)	Sydney Cricket Ground (crowd: 43,986)	Report; Stats
Saturday, 18 April (1:15 pm)	Gold Coast 17.17 (119)	def.	Essendon 17.8 (110)	People First Stadium (crowd: 19,039)	Report; Stats
Saturday, 18 April (4:15 pm)	Hawthorn 13.11 (89)	def.	Port Adelaide 13.8 (86)	Marvel Stadium (crowd: 37,070)	Report; Stats
Saturday, 18 April (7:05 pm)	Adelaide 15.13 (103)	def.	St Kilda 15.12 (102)	Adelaide Oval (crowd: 45,854)	Report; Stats
Sunday, 19 April (1:10 pm)	North Melbourne 20.10 (130)	def.	Richmond 7.13 (55)	Marvel Stadium (crowd: 36,584)	Report; Stats
Sunday, 19 April (3:15 pm)	Melbourne 16.8 (104)	def.	Brisbane Lions 15.12 (102)	Melbourne Cricket Ground (crowd: 41,629)	Report; Stats
Sunday, 19 April (3:10 pm)	West Coast 5.11 (41)	def. by	Fremantle 14.13 (97)	Optus Stadium (crowd: 54,232)	Report; Stats
Talor Byrne (Carlton) had a shot at goal after the final siren to draw the match against Collingwood, but kicked a behind.; Due to nearby lightning, the start of the third quarter of the Sydney v Greater Western Sydney match was delayed by 40 minutes under the AFL's lightning protocols.; The crowd of 43,986 for the Sydney v Greater Western Sydney match was the largest crowd for a home-and-away Sydney Derby and the largest between the two clubs at the Sydney Cricket Ground.

=== Round 7 ===
	Round 7 (Anzac Appeal Round)
Thursday, 23 April (7:30 pm)	Western Bulldogs 9.6 (60)	def. by	Sydney 18.18 (126)	Marvel Stadium (crowd: 29,523)	Report; Stats
Friday, 24 April (7:40 pm)	Richmond 11.6 (72)	def. by	Melbourne 19.12 (126)	Melbourne Cricket Ground (crowd: 67,364)	Report; Stats
Saturday, 25 April (12:30 pm)	Hawthorn 16.16 (112)	def.	Gold Coast 9.9 (63)	University of Tasmania Stadium (crowd: 8,263)	Report; Stats
Saturday, 25 April (3:20 pm)	Essendon 9.6 (60)	def. by	Collingwood 20.17 (137)	Melbourne Cricket Ground (crowd: 92,231)	Report; Stats
Saturday, 25 April (6:05 pm)	Port Adelaide 13.17 (95)	def.	Geelong 10.5 (65)	Adelaide Oval (crowd: 41,164)	Report; Stats
Saturday, 25 April (6:15 pm)	Fremantle 16.7 (103)	def.	Carlton 13.11 (89)	Optus Stadium (crowd: 54,100)	Report; Stats
Sunday, 26 April (1:10 pm)	St Kilda 22.11 (143)	def.	West Coast 5.12 (42)	Marvel Stadium (crowd: 29,070)	Report; Stats
Sunday, 26 April (3:15 pm)	Brisbane Lions 19.13 (127)	def.	Adelaide 11.9 (75)	The Gabba (crowd: 32,629)	Report; Stats
Sunday, 26 April (4:40 pm)	Greater Western Sydney 15.15 (105)	def.	North Melbourne 14.14 (98)	Corroboree Group Oval (crowd: 12,597)	Report; Stats
The Hawthorn v Gold Coast match was moved back from 12:15pm to 12:30pm after having mistakenly been scheduled in violation of Tasmanian law prohibiting sporting events from commencing before 12:30pm on Anzac Day; consequently, the Essendon v Collingwood match was moved back by five minutes to minimise overlap between the two matches.; The crowd of 54,100 for the Fremantle v Carlton match was the largest crowd for a match between the two clubs.

=== Round 8 ===
	Round 8
Thursday, 30 April (7:30 pm)	Collingwood 15.3 (93)	drew with	Hawthorn 13.15 (93)	Melbourne Cricket Ground (crowd: 76,632)	Report; Stats
Friday, 1 May (7:30 pm)	Western Bulldogs 15.12 (102)	def. by	Fremantle 17.12 (114)	Marvel Stadium (crowd: 23,071)	Report; Stats
Friday, 1 May (7:40 pm)	Adelaide 11.10 (76)	def.	Port Adelaide 11.9 (75)	Adelaide Oval (crowd: 53,045)	Report; Stats
Saturday, 2 May (12:35 pm)	Essendon 11.13 (79)	def. by	Brisbane Lions 22.11 (143)	Marvel Stadium (crowd: 31,595)	Report; Stats
Saturday, 2 May (2:15 pm)	West Coast 13.10 (88)	def. by	Richmond 15.9 (99)	Optus Stadium (crowd: 46,350)	Report; Stats
Saturday, 2 May (4:35 pm)	Geelong 21.9 (135)	def.	North Melbourne 13.8 (86)	GMHBA Stadium (crowd: 32,485)	Report; Stats
Saturday, 2 May (7:35 pm)	Carlton 9.15 (69)	def. by	St Kilda 16.12 (108)	Marvel Stadium (crowd: 41,062)	Report; Stats
Sunday, 3 May (3:15 pm)	Sydney 19.17 (131)	def.	Melbourne 17.12 (114)	Sydney Cricket Ground (crowd: 40,673)	Report; Stats
Sunday, 3 May (7:20 pm)	Gold Coast 11.17 (83)	def.	Greater Western Sydney 8.15 (63)	People First Stadium (crowd: 13,537)	Report; Stats
Dylan Moore (Hawthorn) kicked a goal after the final siren to draw the match against Collingwood.; Richmond's win over West Coast ended a twelve-match losing streak.

=== Round 9 ===
	Round 9
Thursday, 7 May (6:10 pm)	Fremantle 12.16 (88)	def.	Hawthorn 11.7 (73)	Optus Stadium (crowd: 54,140)	Report; Stats
Friday, 8 May (7:30 pm)	Brisbane Lions 14.16 (100)	def.	Carlton 13.11 (89)	The Gabba (crowd: 31,147)	Report; Stats
Friday, 8 May (7:40 pm)	Port Adelaide 10.12 (72)	def. by	Western Bulldogs 10.14 (74)	Adelaide Oval (crowd: 33,883)	Report; Stats
Saturday, 9 May (12:35 pm)	North Melbourne 14.13 (97)	def. by	Sydney 16.9 (105)	Marvel Stadium (crowd: 28,156)	Report; Stats
Saturday, 9 May (4:15 pm)	Greater Western Sydney 16.7 (103)	def.	Essendon 13.11 (89)	Engie Stadium (crowd: 9,416)	Report; Stats
Saturday, 9 May (6:40 pm)	Gold Coast 13.11 (89)	def.	St Kilda 8.12 (60)	TIO Stadium (crowd: 10,672)	Report; Stats
Saturday, 9 May (7:35 pm)	Geelong 18.14 (122)	def.	Collingwood 9.14 (68)	Melbourne Cricket Ground (crowd: 83,166)	Report; Stats
Sunday, 10 May (1:10 pm)	Melbourne 15.9 (99)	def.	West Coast 9.13 (67)	Marvel Stadium (crowd: 16,650)	Report; Stats
Sunday, 10 May (3:15 pm)	Richmond 9.7 (61)	def. by	Adelaide 14.14 (98)	Melbourne Cricket Ground (crowd: 22,123)	Report; Stats
The crowd of 54,140 for the Fremantle v Hawthorn match was the largest crowd for a home-and-away match between the two clubs.

=== Round 10 ===
	Round 10 (Sir Doug Nicholls Round week 1)
Thursday, 14 May (7:30 pm)	Brisbane Lions 11.10 (76)	def. by	Geelong 17.15 (117)	The Gabba (crowd: 29,221)	Report; Stats
Friday, 15 May (7:30 pm)	Sydney 11.15 (81)	def.	Collingwood 10.15 (75)	Sydney Cricket Ground (crowd: 40,627)	Report; Stats
Friday, 15 May (7:40 pm)	Gold Coast 15.8 (98)	def.	Port Adelaide 10.13 (73)	TIO Stadium (crowd: 11,974)	Report; Stats
Saturday, 16 May (12:45 pm)	Adelaide 20.13 (133)	def.	North Melbourne 9.11 (65)	Adelaide Oval (crowd: 41,313)	Report; Stats
Saturday, 16 May (4:15 pm)	Melbourne 18.12 (120)	def.	Hawthorn 12.9 (81)	Melbourne Cricket Ground (crowd: 68,557)	Report; Stats
Saturday, 16 May (7:35 pm)	Carlton 10.14 (74)	def.	Western Bulldogs 9.8 (62)	Marvel Stadium (crowd: 39,217)	Report; Stats
Sunday, 17 May (1:10 pm)	Essendon 8.13 (61)	def. by	Fremantle 16.8 (104)	Melbourne Cricket Ground (crowd: 25,100)	Report; Stats
Sunday, 17 May (3:15 pm)	St Kilda 16.13 (109)	def.	Richmond 11.7 (73)	Marvel Stadium (crowd: 31,230)	Report; Stats
Sunday, 17 May (4:15 pm)	West Coast 13.10 (88)	def.	Greater Western Sydney 10.11 (71)	Optus Stadium (crowd: 36,781)	Report; Stats
The crowd of 68,557 for the Melbourne v Hawthorn match was the largest crowd for a home-and-away match between the two clubs.

=== Round 11 ===
	Round 11 (Sir Doug Nicholls Round week 2)
Thursday, 21 May (7:30 pm)	Hawthorn 10.15 (75)	def.	Adelaide 9.12 (66)	University of Tasmania Stadium (crowd: 8,312)	Report; Stats
Friday, 22 May (7:45 pm)	Richmond 10.14 (74)	def.	Essendon 7.14 (56)	Melbourne Cricket Ground (crowd: 78,815)	Report; Stats
Friday, 22 May (6:30 pm)	Fremantle 16.8 (104)	def.	St Kilda 11.8 (74)	Optus Stadium (crowd: 53,707)	Report; Stats
Saturday, 23 May (1:15 pm)	North Melbourne 17.9 (111)	def.	Gold Coast 16.9 (105)	Marvel Stadium (crowd: 16,260)	Report; Stats
Saturday, 23 May (4:15 pm)	Geelong 15.17 (107)	def.	Sydney 12.8 (80)	GMHBA Stadium (crowd: 35,869)	Report; Stats
Saturday, 23 May (4:35 pm)	Collingwood 13.14 (92)	def.	West Coast 12.10 (82)	Melbourne Cricket Ground (crowd: 90,028)	Report; Stats
Saturday, 23 May (7:05 pm)	Port Adelaide 8.10 (58)	def. by	Carlton 13.14 (92)	Adelaide Oval (crowd: 40,597)	Report; Stats
Sunday, 24 May (12:30 pm)	Greater Western Sydney 26.10 (166)	def.	Brisbane Lions 13.10 (88)	Engie Stadium (crowd: 8,394)	Report; Stats
Sunday, 24 May (3:15 pm)	Western Bulldogs 14.9 (93)	def.	Melbourne 13.12 (90)	Marvel Stadium (crowd: 29,708)	Report; Stats
The crowd of 53,707 for the Fremantle v St Kilda match was the largest crowd for a match between the two clubs.; Fremantle's win over St Kilda was its tenth consecutive win, a club record; it would win a further four matches to extend the streak to 14 matches.; North Melbourne trailed by 43 points in the second quarter of its match against Gold Coast and went on to win, recording its biggest comeback since 1947; Cameron Zurhaar (North Melbourne) kicked the winning goal after the final siren.; Scott Pendlebury (Collingwood) played his 433rd AFL match against West Coast, breaking the VFL/AFL games record held by Brent Harvey (North Melbourne); the crowd of 90,028 for the match was the largest crowd for a home-and-away match involving a non-Victorian club.; Greater Western Sydney scored 14.2 (86) in the third quarter of its match against the Brisbane Lions; this was the highest-scoring quarter in the club's history, and the highest-scoring quarter against a reigning premier and highest-scoring third quarter in VFL/AFL history.; Greater Western Sydney's final score of 26.10 (166) against the Brisbane Lions was its highest ever.

=== Round 12 ===
	Round 12
Thursday, 28 May (7:30 pm)	St Kilda 9.13 (67)	def. by	Hawthorn 18.11 (119)	Marvel Stadium (crowd: 33,476)	Report; Stats
Friday, 29 May (7:40 pm)	Carlton 12.16 (88)	def.	Geelong 12.12 (84)	Melbourne Cricket Ground (crowd: 61,081)	Report; Stats
Saturday, 30 May (1:15 pm)	Sydney 25.20 (170)	def.	Richmond 8.8 (56)	Sydney Cricket Ground (crowd: 38,013)	Report; Stats
Saturday, 30 May (4:15 pm)	Brisbane Lions 10.18 (78)	def. by	Fremantle 15.13 (103)	The Gabba (crowd: 32,423)	Report; Stats
Saturday, 30 May (7:35 pm)	Western Bulldogs 14.13 (97)	def.	Collingwood 13.15 (93)	Marvel Stadium (crowd: 43,430)	Report; Stats
Sunday, 31 May (2:45 pm)	Melbourne 9.16 (70)	def. by	Greater Western Sydney 19.5 (119)	TIO Traeger Park (crowd: 6,374)	Report; Stats
Sunday, 31 May (5:20 pm)	West Coast 12.13 (85)	def.	Essendon 8.7 (55)	Optus Stadium (crowd: 37,623)	Report; Stats
	Bye: Adelaide; Gold Coast; North Melbourne; Port Adelaide
St Kilda scored 0.5 (5) in the first half of its match against Hawthorn; this was its first goalless opening half since 1987 and its equal-lowest half-time score since 1957.

=== Round 13 ===
	Round 13
Thursday, 4 June (7:00 pm)	Adelaide 11.9 (75)	def.	Geelong 10.14 (74)	Adelaide Oval (crowd: 42,340)	Report; Stats
Friday, 5 June (7:40 pm)	Hawthorn 9.17 (71)	def. by	Western Bulldogs 12.5 (77)	Melbourne Cricket Ground (crowd: 59,556)	Report; Stats
Saturday, 6 June (12:15 pm)	North Melbourne 4.7 (31)	def. by	Fremantle 24.11 (155)	Hands Oval (crowd: 13,331)	Report; Stats
Saturday, 6 June (5:15 pm)	Gold Coast 11.9 (75)	def. by	Brisbane Lions 15.16 (106)	People First Stadium (crowd: 21,139)	Report; Stats
Saturday, 6 June (6:15 pm)	West Coast 10.11 (71)	def. by	Port Adelaide 11.11 (77)	Optus Stadium (crowd: 47,479)	Report; Stats
Sunday, 7 June (3:15 pm)	Sydney 15.14 (104)	def.	St Kilda 15.12 (102)	Sydney Cricket Ground (crowd: 42,143)	Report; Stats
Sunday, 7 June (7:20 pm)	Essendon 10.7 (67)	def. by	Carlton 10.12 (72)	Melbourne Cricket Ground (crowd: 76,745)	Report; Stats
Monday, 8 June (3:15 pm)	Collingwood 11.9 (75)	def. by	Melbourne 12.11 (83)	Melbourne Cricket Ground (crowd: 88,019)	Report; Stats
	Bye: Greater Western Sydney; Richmond
The crowd of 59,556 for the Hawthorn v Western Bulldogs match was the largest crowd for a home-and-away match between the two clubs.; The margin of 124 points in the North Melbourne v Fremantle match was Fremantle's biggest ever win and the biggest loss of North Melbourne coach Alastair Clarkson's coaching career.; Fremantle kicked the last 19 goals in its win over North Melbourne, the longest unanswered sequence of goals in its history.; The crowd of 21,139 for the Gold Coast v Brisbane Lions match was the largest crowd for a QClash at People First Stadium.; The crowd of 88,019 for the Collingwood v Melbourne match was the largest crowd for a home-and-away match between the two clubs since 1958.; Six matches in round 13 were decided by margins under ten points, the most in a home-and-away round in VFL/AFL history.

=== Round 14 ===
	Round 14
Thursday, 11 June (7:30 pm)	Western Bulldogs 9.10 (64)	def. by	Adelaide 19.7 (121)	Marvel Stadium (crowd: 22,761)	Report; Stats
Friday, 12 June (7:40 pm)	Geelong 15.15 (105)	def.	Gold Coast 8.12 (60)	GMHBA Stadium (crowd: 30,276)	Report; Stats
Saturday, 13 June (1:15 pm)	Melbourne 13.17 (95)	def.	Essendon 6.14 (50)	Melbourne Cricket Ground (crowd: 41,438)	Report; Stats
Saturday, 13 June (2:15 pm)	North Melbourne 10.14 (74)	def.	West Coast 10.13 (73)	Optus Stadium (crowd: 42,409)	Report; Stats
Saturday, 13 June (7:05 pm)	Port Adelaide 13.12 (90)	def. by	Sydney 14.9 (93)	Adelaide Oval (crowd: 31,350)	Report; Stats
Sunday, 14 June (1:10 pm)	Richmond 12.8 (80)	def. by	Brisbane Lions 17.13 (115)	Ninja Stadium (crowd: 10,200)	Report; Stats
Sunday, 14 June (3:15 pm)	St Kilda 14.12 (96)	def.	Greater Western Sydney 13.10 (88)	Marvel Stadium (crowd: 17,748)	Report; Stats
	Bye: Carlton; Collingwood; Fremantle; Hawthorn

=== Round 15 ===
	Round 15
Thursday, 18 June (6:10 pm)	Fremantle 14.15 (99)	def.	Geelong 14.6 (90)	Optus Stadium (crowd: 55,201)	Report; Stats
Friday, 19 June (7:40 pm)	Gold Coast 14.13 (97)	def. by	Hawthorn 17.11 (113)	People First Stadium (crowd: 19,576)	Report; Stats
Saturday, 20 June (12:45 pm)	Adelaide 11.13 (79)	def.	Melbourne 9.8 (62)	Adelaide Oval (crowd: 46,337)	Report; Stats
Saturday, 20 June (4:15 pm)	Greater Western Sydney 9.11 (65)	def. by	Carlton 12.16 (88)	Engie Stadium (crowd: 13,709)	Report; Stats
Saturday, 20 June (7:35 pm)	Collingwood 11.12 (78)	def.	Port Adelaide 6.16 (52)	Melbourne Cricket Ground (crowd: 40,860)	Report; Stats
Sunday, 21 June (1:10 pm)	Richmond 6.12 (48)	def. by	North Melbourne 10.13 (73)	Melbourne Cricket Ground (crowd: 41,806)	Report; Stats
Sunday, 21 June (3:15 pm)	St Kilda 8.13 (61)	def. by	Western Bulldogs 12.11 (83)	Marvel Stadium (crowd: 30,194)	Report; Stats
	Bye: Brisbane Lions; Essendon; Sydney; West Coast
The crowd of 55,201 for the Fremantle v Geelong match was the largest crowd for a match between the two clubs.

=== Round 16 ===
	Round 16
Thursday, 25 June (7:30 pm)	Brisbane Lions 19.12 (126)	def.	Sydney 12.11 (83)	The Gabba (crowd: 29,700)	Report; Stats
Friday, 26 June (7:40 pm)	Hawthorn 14.12 (96)	def.	Greater Western Sydney 12.10 (82)	Melbourne Cricket Ground (crowd: 35,238)	Report; Stats
Saturday, 27 June (1:15 pm)	Carlton 17.15 (117)	def.	West Coast 9.10 (64)	Marvel Stadium (crowd: 41,861)	Report; Stats
Saturday, 27 June (4:15 pm)	Collingwood 15.16 (106)	def.	Richmond 11.6 (72)	Melbourne Cricket Ground (crowd: 62,117)	Report; Stats
Saturday, 27 June (7:05 pm)	Port Adelaide 13.19 (97)	def.	Adelaide 11.5 (71)	Adelaide Oval (crowd: 50,087)	Report; Stats
Sunday, 28 June (3:15 pm)	North Melbourne 10.19 (79)	def.	Essendon 9.11 (65)	Marvel Stadium (crowd: 37,054)	Report; Stats
Sunday, 28 June (3:10 pm)	Fremantle 11.14 (80)	def.	Gold Coast 3.11 (29)	Optus Stadium (crowd: 50,602)	Report; Stats
	Bye: Geelong; Melbourne; St Kilda; Western Bulldogs
The crowd of 35,238 for the Hawthorn v Greater Western Sydney match was the largest crowd for a home-and-away match between the two clubs.; The crowd of 50,602 for the Fremantle v Gold Coast match was the largest crowd for a home-and-away match between the two clubs.; Gold Coast's final score of 3.11 (29) was its lowest against Fremantle.

=== Round 17 ===
	Round 17
Thursday, 2 July (7:30 pm)	Geelong 14.17 (101)	def. by	Brisbane Lions 19.9 (123)	GMHBA Stadium (crowd: 26,741)	Report; Stats
Friday, 3 July (7:40 pm)	Sydney 13.12 (90)	def.	Western Bulldogs 7.13 (55)	Sydney Cricket Ground (crowd: 40,770)	Report; Stats
Friday, 3 July (6:10 pm)	West Coast 11.8 (74)	def. by	Adelaide 15.9 (99)	Optus Stadium (crowd: 35,227)	Report; Stats
Saturday, 4 July (1:15 pm)	Hawthorn 14.6 (90)	def. by	Melbourne 19.11 (125)	University of Tasmania Stadium (crowd: 9,377)	Report; Stats
Saturday, 4 July (1:35 pm)	Greater Western Sydney 16.13 (109)	def.	Fremantle 13.10 (88)	Corroboree Group Oval (crowd: 11,856)	Report; Stats
Saturday, 4 July (4:15 pm)	Gold Coast 15.8 (98)	def. by	Collingwood 15.14 (104)	People First Stadium (crowd: 21,072)	Report; Stats
Saturday, 4 July (7:35 pm)	Richmond 10.12 (72)	def. by	Carlton 10.14 (74)	Melbourne Cricket Ground (crowd: 54,923)	Report; Stats
Sunday, 5 July (3:15 pm)	Essendon 7.8 (50)	def. by	St Kilda 17.15 (117)	Marvel Stadium (crowd: 34,713)	Report; Stats
Sunday, 5 July (4:10 pm)	Port Adelaide 10.13 (73)	def.	North Melbourne 7.10 (52)	Adelaide Oval (crowd: 33,105)	Report; Stats
Fremantle's loss to Greater Western Sydney ended a club-record 14-match winning streak.

=== Round 18 ===
	Round 18
Thursday, 9 July (6:10 pm)	Fremantle 15.21 (111)	def.	Sydney 10.13 (73)	Optus Stadium (crowd: 55,966)	Report; Stats
Friday, 10 July (7:40 pm)	Collingwood 13.11 (89)	def.	North Melbourne 12.13 (85)	Marvel Stadium (crowd: 48,369)	Report; Stats
Saturday, 11 July (1:15 pm)	St Kilda 13.9 (87)	def.	Port Adelaide 10.13 (73)	Marvel Stadium (crowd: 22,074)	Report; Stats
Saturday, 11 July (4:15 pm)	Greater Western Sydney 12.14 (86)	def.	Geelong 11.7 (73)	Engie Stadium (crowd: 13,821)	Report; Stats
Saturday, 11 July (7:35 pm)	Carlton 6.3 (39)	def. by	Hawthorn 15.13 (103)	Melbourne Cricket Ground (crowd: 70,314)	Report; Stats
Saturday, 11 July (7:40 pm)	Adelaide 19.14 (128)	def.	Gold Coast 7.7 (49)	Adelaide Oval (crowd: 40,165)	Report; Stats
Sunday, 12 July (1:10 pm)	Western Bulldogs 13.8 (86)	def.	West Coast 9.16 (70)	Marvel Stadium (crowd: 25,909)	Report; Stats
Sunday, 12 July (3:15 pm)	Melbourne 16.15 (111)	def.	Richmond 9.11 (65)	Melbourne Cricket Ground (crowd: 32,893)	Report; Stats
Sunday, 12 July (4:40 pm)	Brisbane Lions 22.17 (149)	def.	Essendon 8.11 (59)	The Gabba (crowd: 30,505)	Report; Stats
The crowd of 55,966 for the Fremantle v Sydney match was the largest crowd for a home-and-away match between the two clubs and Fremantle's largest home crowd for a home-and-away match outside of a Western Derby.; Fremantle's score of 9.5 (59) in the final quarter of its match against Sydney was the highest in a final quarter in its history.; Fremantle's final score of 15.21 (111) against Sydney was the highest by a team that went goalless in the first half of a match, having scored 0.11 (11) to half-time.; Greater Western Sydney trailed by 39 points in the third quarter of its match against Geelong and went on to win, recording its equal-biggest comeback.; The Brisbane Lions' 90-point win was its biggest over Essendon.

=== Round 19 ===
	Round 19
Thursday, 16 July (7:30 pm)	Geelong 15.12 (102)	def.	St Kilda 11.9 (75)	GMHBA Stadium (crowd: 23,737)	Report; Stats
Friday, 17 July (7:40 pm)	Sydney 10.11 (71)	def. by	Adelaide 13.9 (87)	Sydney Cricket Ground (crowd: 33,413)	Report; Stats
Saturday, 18 July (12:45 pm)	Port Adelaide 11.9 (75)	def. by	Fremantle 15.13 (103)	Adelaide Oval (crowd: 28,727)	Report; Stats
Saturday, 18 July (4:15 pm)	North Melbourne 11.10 (76)	def. by	Melbourne 13.14 (92)	Marvel Stadium (crowd: 25,025)	Report; Stats
Saturday, 18 July (7:35 pm)	Collingwood 14.6 (90)	def.	Carlton 10.9 (69)	Melbourne Cricket Ground (crowd: 83,885)	Report; Stats
Saturday, 18 July (6:10 pm)	West Coast 10.9 (69)	def. by	Brisbane Lions 13.15 (93)	Optus Stadium (crowd: 41,560)	Report; Stats
Sunday, 19 July (1:10 pm)	Richmond 6.16 (52)	def. by	Hawthorn 18.14 (122)	Melbourne Cricket Ground (crowd: 49,127)	Report; Stats
Sunday, 19 July (3:15 pm)	Gold Coast 9.14 (68)	def. by	Western Bulldogs 11.11 (77)	People First Stadium (crowd: 14,809)	Report; Stats
Sunday, 19 July (4:40 pm)	Essendon 10.7 (67)	def.	Greater Western Sydney 8.16 (64)	Marvel Stadium (crowd: 14,601)	Report; Stats
The crowd of 14,601 for the Essendon v Greater Western Sydney match was Essendon's smallest home crowd since 2016, excluding matches with restricted crowds during the COVID-19-affected 2020 and 2021 seasons.; Jake Stringer (Greater Western Sydney) kicked seven behinds without a goal in the match against Essendon, the most behinds by a player without kicking a goal since 2003.; Essendon's win over Greater Western Sydney ended a 12-match losing streak, and was its first win in Victoria in over a year.

=== Round 20 ===
	Round 20
Thursday, 23 July (7:00 pm)	Adelaide 11.8 (74)	def. by	Collingwood 16.12 (108)	Adelaide Oval (crowd: 50,109)	Report; Stats
Friday, 24 July (7:40 pm)	Melbourne 14.13 (97)	def. by	Geelong 18.9 (117)	Melbourne Cricket Ground (crowd: 49,292)	Report; Stats
Friday, 24 July (6:10 pm)	Fremantle 16.16 (112)	def.	West Coast 6.6 (42)	Optus Stadium (crowd: 56,616)	Report; Stats
Saturday, 25 July (1:05 pm)	Carlton 16.14 (110)	def.	Gold Coast 15.7 (97)	Marvel Stadium (crowd: 26,945)	Report; Stats
Saturday, 25 July (4:15 pm)	Hawthorn 19.18 (132)	def.	Essendon 5.9 (39)	Melbourne Cricket Ground (crowd: 42,509)	Report; Stats
Saturday, 25 July (4:35 pm)	Greater Western Sydney 13.10 (88)	def. by	Sydney 21.13 (139)	Engie Stadium (crowd: 20,141)	Report; Stats
Saturday, 25 July (7:40 pm)	Western Bulldogs 15.15 (105)	def.	Richmond 7.6 (48)	Marvel Stadium (crowd: 25,154)	Report; Stats
Sunday, 26 July (1:10 pm)	Brisbane Lions 19.12 (126)	def.	Port Adelaide 9.13 (67)	The Gabba (crowd: 30,722)	Report; Stats
Sunday, 26 July (3:15 pm)	North Melbourne 8.14 (62)	def. by	St Kilda 13.15 (93)	Marvel Stadium (crowd: 25,523)	Report; Stats
The crowd of 56,616 for the Fremantle v West Coast match was Fremantle's largest home crowd for a home-and-away match.; Essendon's final score of 5.9 (39) was its lowest against Hawthorn.

=== Round 21 ===
	Round 21
Thursday, 30 July (7:30 pm)	Collingwood 10.12 (72)	def. by	Geelong 15.7 (97)	Melbourne Cricket Ground (crowd: 60,023)	Report; Stats
Friday, 31 July (6:10 pm)	Fremantle 11.12 (78)	def.	Western Bulldogs 5.11 (41)	Optus Stadium (crowd: 53,524)	Report; Stats
Saturday, 1 August (1:05 pm)	St Kilda 13.10 (88)	def. by	Sydney 16.11 (107)	Marvel Stadium (crowd: 32,512)	Report; Stats
Saturday, 1 August (1:35 pm)	Hawthorn 14.15 (99)	def.	North Melbourne 12.11 (83)	University of Tasmania Stadium (crowd: 9,420)	Report; Stats
Saturday, 1 August (6:05 pm)	Port Adelaide 9.9 (63)	def. by	Greater Western Sydney 10.15 (75)	Adelaide Oval (crowd: 30,758)	Report; Stats
Saturday, 1 August (7:40 pm)	Carlton 24.10 (154)	def.	Brisbane Lions 11.12 (78)	Marvel Stadium (crowd: 40,988)	Report; Stats
Sunday, 2 August (1:10 pm)	Richmond 12.12 (84)	def.	West Coast 9.19 (73)	Melbourne Cricket Ground (crowd: 33,737)	Report; Stats
Sunday, 2 August (3:15 pm)	Gold Coast 16.9 (105)	def. by	Melbourne 18.6 (114)	People First Stadium (crowd: 14,963)	Report; Stats
Sunday, 2 August (4:40 pm)	Essendon 11.7 (73)	def. by	Adelaide 23.7 (145)	Marvel Stadium (crowd: 20,518)	Report; Stats
The crowd of 53,524 for the Fremantle v Western Bulldogs match was the largest crowd for a home-and-away match between the two clubs.

=== Round 22 ===
	Round 22
Thursday, 6 August (7:30 pm)	Western Bulldogs 11.11 (77)	def. by	North Melbourne 15.10 (100)	Marvel Stadium (crowd: 25,052)	Report; Stats
Friday, 7 August (7:40 pm)	Brisbane Lions 18.17 (125)	def.	Hawthorn 8.10 (58)	The Gabba (crowd: 33,003)	Report; Stats
Saturday, 8 August (1:15 pm)	Melbourne 17.11 (113)	def.	Fremantle 17.7 (109)	Melbourne Cricket Ground (crowd: 40,938)	Report; Stats
Saturday, 8 August (4:15 pm)	Sydney 26.11 (167)	def.	Port Adelaide 10.10 (70)	Sydney Cricket Ground (crowd: 40,014)	Report; Stats
Saturday, 8 August (4:35 pm)	Geelong 17.15 (117)	def.	Essendon 7.8 (50)	GMHBA Stadium (crowd: 33,379)	Report; Stats
Saturday, 8 August (7:05 pm)	Adelaide 9.9 (63)	def.	Richmond 7.12 (54)	Adelaide Oval (crowd: 42,762)	Report; Stats
Sunday, 9 August (1:10 pm)	Greater Western Sydney 11.11 (77)	def. by	Gold Coast 11.13 (79)	Corroboree Group Oval (crowd: 5,814)	Report; Stats
Sunday, 9 August (2:10 pm)	West Coast 15.8 (98)	def. by	Collingwood 17.15 (117)	Optus Stadium (crowd: 47,609)	Report; Stats
Sunday, 9 August (7:20 pm)	St Kilda 8.14 (62)	def. by	Carlton 16.10 (106)	Marvel Stadium (crowd: 43,434)	Report; Stats
Sydney's final score of 26.11 (167) was its highest against Port Adelaide.; Gold Coast's win over Greater Western Sydney ended a ten-match losing streak.

=== Round 23 ===
	Round 23
Friday, 14 August (6:10 pm)	Fremantle 16.16 (112)	def.	Adelaide 13.10 (88)	Optus Stadium (crowd: 55,010)	Report; Stats
Saturday, 15 August (12:35 pm)	Richmond 6.9 (45)	def. by	St Kilda 14.10 (94)	Melbourne Cricket Ground (crowd: 35,850)	Report; Stats
Saturday, 15 August (3:45 pm)	North Melbourne 17.8 (110)	def. by	Geelong 19.11 (125)	Marvel Stadium (crowd: 35,529)	Report; Stats
Saturday, 15 August (4:15 pm)	Brisbane Lions 14.11 (95)	def.	Gold Coast 6.17 (53)	The Gabba (crowd: 30,413)	Report; Stats
Saturday, 15 August (7:40 pm)	Hawthorn 13.14 (92)	drew with	Collingwood 13.14 (92)	Melbourne Cricket Ground (crowd: 76,186)	Report; Stats
Saturday, 15 August (7:40 pm)	Port Adelaide 8.8 (56)	def. by	Melbourne 20.12 (132)	Adelaide Oval (crowd: 28,417)	Report; Stats
Sunday, 16 August (1:40 pm)	Greater Western Sydney 16.15 (111)	def.	West Coast 7.15 (57)	Engie Stadium (crowd: 7,345)	Report; Stats
Sunday, 16 August (3:15 pm)	Western Bulldogs 12.10 (82)	drew with	Carlton 12.10 (82)	Marvel Stadium (crowd: 44,106)	Report; Stats
Sunday, 16 August (4:40 pm)	Essendon 11.10 (76)	def. by	Sydney 17.10 (112)	Melbourne Cricket Ground (crowd: 24,767)	Report; Stats
The crowd of 55,010 for the Fremantle v Adelaide match was the largest crowd for a match between the two clubs.; Dylan Moore (Hawthorn) had a shot at goal at the final siren to win the match against Collingwood, having kicked the match-drawing goal against Collingwood earlier in the season, but the ball fell short, resulting in a second draw.; The crowd of 24,767 for the Essendon v Sydney match was the smallest for a match involving Essendon at the Melbourne Cricket Ground since 1993, excluding matches with restricted crowds during the COVID-19-affected 2020 and 2021 seasons.; Round 23 was the first home-and-away round to feature two draws since 1977.

=== Round 24 ===
	Round 24
Thursday, 20 August (7:30 pm)	St Kilda 12.8 (80)	def. by	Gold Coast 14.19 (103)	Marvel Stadium (crowd: 14,429)	Report; Stats
Friday, 21 August (7:40 pm)	Collingwood 15.6 (96)	def. by	Brisbane Lions 25.9 (159)	Melbourne Cricket Ground (crowd: 66,846)	Report; Stats
Saturday, 22 August (1:15 pm)	Carlton 18.11 (119)	def.	Fremantle 12.10 (82)	Marvel Stadium (crowd: 42,020)	Report; Stats
Saturday, 22 August (4:15 pm)	Melbourne 12.15 (87)	def. by	Western Bulldogs 16.12 (108)	Melbourne Cricket Ground (crowd: 44,258)	Report; Stats
Saturday, 22 August (7:45 pm)	Geelong 20.13 (133)	def.	Richmond 11.10 (76)	GMHBA Stadium (crowd: 29,194)	Report; Stats
Saturday, 22 August (7:40 pm)	Adelaide 24.13 (157)	def.	Greater Western Sydney 15.11 (101)	Adelaide Oval (crowd: 52,332)	Report; Stats
Sunday, 23 August (12:20 pm)	Essendon 14.11 (95)	def. by	Port Adelaide 16.9 (105)	Marvel Stadium (crowd: 29,200)	Report; Stats
Sunday, 23 August (3:20 pm)	Sydney 17.21 (123)	def.	North Melbourne 10.10 (70)	Sydney Cricket Ground (crowd: 30,058)	Report; Stats
Sunday, 23 August (5:20 pm)	West Coast 6.9 (45)	def. by	Hawthorn 16.11 (107)	Optus Stadium (crowd: 43,066)	Report; Stats
The crowd of 52,332 for the Adelaide v Greater Western Sydney match was the largest crowd for a home-and-away match between the two clubs.

== Ladder ==
Pos	Team	Pld	W	L	D	PF	PA	PP	Pts	Qualification
1	Fremantle	23	19	4	0	2286	1666	137.2	76	Finals series
2	Sydney	23	18	5	0	2543	1869	136.1	72	Finals series
3	Brisbane Lions (P)	23	16	7	0	2499	2054	121.7	64	Finals series
4	Hawthorn	23	15	6	2	2260	1881	120.1	64	Finals series
5	Geelong	23	15	8	0	2355	1925	122.3	60	Finals series
6	Adelaide	23	15	8	0	2169	1849	117.3	60	Finals series
7	Melbourne	23	15	8	0	2301	2099	109.6	60	Finals series
8	Western Bulldogs	23	13	9	1	1901	1992	95.4	54	Finals series
9	Collingwood	23	12	9	2	2021	1974	102.4	52	Finals series
10	Carlton	23	12	10	1	2007	1978	101.5	50	Finals series
11	St Kilda	23	10	13	0	2030	1974	102.8	40	
12	Greater Western Sydney	23	10	13	0	2073	2095	98.9	40	
13	Gold Coast	23	9	14	0	2011	2128	94.5	36	
14	North Melbourne	23	9	14	0	1932	2175	88.8	36	
15	Port Adelaide	23	7	16	0	1804	2048	88.1	28	
16	West Coast	23	4	19	0	1615	2333	69.2	16	
17	Richmond	23	3	20	0	1483	2373	62.5	12	
18	Essendon	23	2	21	0	1601	2478	64.6	8	

Source: afl.com.au
Rules for classification: 1) points; 2) percentage; 3) number of points for
(P) Premiers

== Progression by round ==
4	Finished the round in first place	0	Finished the round in last place
4	Won the minor premiership	0	Finished the season in last place
4	Finished the round inside the top ten		
4_{1}	Subscript indicates the ladder position at the end of the round		
4_{1}	Underlined points indicate the team had a bye that round		

Team	O	1	2	3	4	5	6	7	8	9	10	11	12	13	14	15	16	17	18	19	20	21	22	23	24
Fremantle	0	0_{13}	4_{5}	8_{3}	12_{4}	16_{2}	20_{2}	24_{2}	28_{2}	32_{2}	36_{2}	40_{1}	44_{1}	48_{1}	48_{1}	52_{1}	56_{1}	56_{1}	60_{1}	64_{1}	68_{1}	72_{1}	72_{1}	76_{1}	76_{1}
Sydney	4_{1}	8_{1}	8_{3}	8_{4}	12_{2}	16_{1}	20_{1}	24_{1}	28_{1}	32_{1}	36_{1}	36_{2}	40_{2}	44_{2}	48_{2}	48_{2}	48_{2}	52_{2}	52_{2}	52_{2}	56_{2}	60_{2}	64_{2}	68_{2}	72_{2}
Brisbane Lions	0_{6}	0_{15}	0_{16}	4_{13}	8_{9}	12_{6}	12_{9}	16_{5}	20_{4}	24_{4}	24_{7}	24_{8}	24_{9}	28_{9}	32_{7}	32_{8}	36_{5}	40_{4}	44_{4}	48_{4}	52_{4}	52_{5}	56_{4}	60_{3}	64_{3}
Hawthorn	0_{8}	4_{6}	8_{4}	8_{5}	12_{6}	16_{3}	20_{3}	24_{3}	26_{3}	26_{3}	26_{6}	30_{4}	34_{3}	34_{3}	34_{5}	38_{3}	42_{3}	42_{3}	46_{3}	50_{3}	54_{3}	58_{3}	58_{3}	60_{4}	64_{4}
Geelong	0_{9}	4_{9}	4_{14}	8_{10}	8_{11}	12_{8}	16_{6}	16_{9}	20_{6}	24_{5}	28_{3}	32_{3}	32_{4}	32_{4}	36_{3}	36_{4}	36_{4}	36_{7}	36_{9}	40_{9}	44_{9}	48_{7}	52_{7}	56_{6}	60_{5}
Adelaide	0	4_{5}	4_{8}	4_{12}	4_{13}	8_{11}	12_{10}	12_{13}	16_{11}	20_{8}	24_{8}	24_{7}	24_{8}	28_{8}	32_{6}	36_{5}	36_{6}	40_{5}	44_{5}	48_{5}	48_{5}	52_{4}	56_{5}	56_{7}	60_{6}
Melbourne	0	4_{7}	4_{11}	8_{8}	12_{7}	12_{9}	16_{8}	20_{4}	20_{7}	24_{7}	28_{5}	28_{6}	28_{6}	32_{5}	36_{4}	36_{6}	36_{7}	40_{6}	44_{6}	48_{6}	48_{6}	52_{6}	56_{6}	60_{5}	60_{7}
Western Bulldogs	4_{5}	8_{3}	12_{2}	12_{2}	16_{1}	16_{4}	16_{7}	16_{10}	16_{12}	20_{9}	20_{10}	24_{9}	28_{7}	32_{6}	32_{8}	36_{7}	36_{8}	36_{8}	40_{7}	44_{7}	48_{7}	48_{8}	48_{9}	50_{9}	54_{8}
Collingwood	4_{4}	4_{8}	4_{9}	8_{7}	8_{10}	8_{13}	12_{11}	16_{8}	18_{8}	18_{10}	18_{11}	22_{10}	22_{11}	22_{11}	22_{13}	26_{11}	30_{10}	34_{9}	38_{8}	42_{8}	46_{8}	46_{9}	50_{8}	52_{8}	52_{9}
Carlton	0_{10}	4_{11}	4_{15}	4_{16}	4_{15}	4_{16}	4_{16}	4_{16}	4_{16}	4_{16}	8_{16}	12_{15}	16_{14}	20_{13}	20_{14}	24_{14}	28_{12}	32_{10}	32_{12}	32_{12}	36_{11}	40_{10}	44_{10}	46_{10}	50_{10}
St Kilda	0_{7}	0_{14}	4_{10}	4_{14}	4_{14}	8_{14}	8_{13}	12_{12}	16_{9}	16_{11}	20_{9}	20_{11}	20_{12}	20_{12}	24_{10}	24_{12}	24_{13}	28_{12}	32_{10}	32_{10}	36_{10}	36_{11}	36_{11}	40_{11}	40_{11}
Greater Western Sydney	4_{3}	4_{10}	4_{13}	4_{15}	4_{16}	8_{12}	8_{14}	12_{14}	12_{14}	16_{13}	16_{13}	20_{12}	24_{10}	24_{10}	24_{11}	24_{13}	24_{14}	28_{13}	32_{11}	32_{11}	32_{12}	36_{12}	36_{12}	40_{12}	40_{12}
Gold Coast	4_{2}	8_{2}	12_{1}	12_{1}	12_{3}	12_{5}	16_{4}	16_{7}	20_{5}	24_{6}	28_{4}	28_{5}	28_{5}	28_{7}	28_{9}	28_{9}	28_{11}	28_{14}	28_{14}	28_{14}	28_{14}	28_{14}	32_{14}	32_{14}	36_{13}
North Melbourne	0	4_{4}	4_{6}	8_{6}	12_{5}	12_{7}	16_{5}	16_{6}	16_{10}	16_{12}	16_{12}	20_{13}	20_{13}	20_{14}	24_{12}	28_{10}	32_{9}	32_{11}	32_{13}	32_{13}	32_{13}	32_{13}	36_{13}	36_{13}	36_{14}
Port Adelaide	0	0_{16}	4_{7}	4_{11}	8_{8}	8_{10}	8_{12}	12_{11}	12_{13}	12_{14}	12_{14}	12_{14}	12_{16}	16_{15}	16_{15}	16_{15}	20_{15}	24_{15}	24_{15}	24_{15}	24_{15}	24_{15}	24_{15}	24_{15}	24_{15}
West Coast	0	0_{18}	4_{12}	8_{9}	8_{12}	8_{15}	8_{15}	8_{15}	8_{15}	8_{15}	12_{15}	12_{16}	16_{15}	16_{16}	16_{16}	16_{16}	16_{16}	16_{16}	16_{16}	16_{16}	16_{16}	16_{16}	16_{16}	16_{16}	16_{16}
Richmond	0	0_{12}	0_{17}	0_{18}	0_{18}	0_{18}	0_{18}	0_{18}	4_{18}	4_{18}	4_{18}	8_{17}	8_{17}	8_{17}	8_{17}	8_{17}	8_{17}	8_{17}	8_{17}	8_{18}	8_{18}	12_{17}	12_{17}	12_{17}	12_{17}
Essendon	0	0_{17}	0_{18}	0_{17}	0_{17}	4_{17}	4_{17}	4_{17}	4_{17}	4_{17}	4_{17}	4_{18}	4_{18}	4_{18}	4_{18}	4_{18}	4_{18}	4_{18}	4_{18}	8_{17}	8_{17}	8_{18}	8_{18}	8_{18}	8_{18}

Source: AFL Tables

== Home matches and membership ==
The following table includes all home match attendance figures from the home-and-away season, excluding neutral matches (Gather Round).

Team	Home match attendance							Membership		
Team	Hosted	Total	Highest	Lowest	Average			2025	2026	Change
Team	Hosted	Total	Highest	Lowest	2025	2026	Change	2025	2026	Change
Adelaide	11	512,069	53,045	40,165	45,120	46,552	▲1,432	81,067	86,307	
Brisbane Lions	11	346,017	34,648	29,221	30,598	31,456	▲858	75,115	85,103	
Carlton	11	583,622	78,058	26,945	49,182	53,057	▲3,875	100,743	97,427	
Collingwood	11	720,868	90,028	40,860	68,873	65,533	▼3,340	112,491	114,976	
Essendon	11	461,008	92,231	14,601	40,034	41,910	▲1,876	85,568	83,842	
Fremantle	11	568,847	56,616	35,245	45,758	51,713	▲5,955	66,179	74,698	
Geelong	11	377,165	83,166	20,403	35,439	34,288	▼1,151	92,379	94,006	
Gold Coast	11	179,949	21,139	10,672	15,679	16,359	▲680	30,107	33,470	
Greater Western Sydney	11	128,399	20,141	5,814	12,026	11,673	▼353	37,705	38,395	
Hawthorn	11	418,588	84,712	8,263	41,484	38,053	▼3,431	87,204	92,095	
Melbourne	11	410,893	68,557	6,374	36,805	37,354	▲549	58,563	65,088	
North Melbourne	11	329,108	45,919	13,331	25,266	29,919	▲4,653	56,283	60,274	
Port Adelaide	11	387,891	50,087	28,417	35,556	35,263	▼293	72,656	75,668	
Richmond	11	458,884	78,815	10,200	44,398	41,717	▼2,681	92,531	92,648	
St Kilda	11	368,549	82,528	14,429	31,644	33,504	▲1,860	65,509	77,400	
Sydney	11	422,654	43,986	30,058	34,277	38,423	▲4,146	76,674	80,558	
West Coast	11	493,276	54,232	36,781	42,576	44,843	▲2,267	107,079	115,324	
Western Bulldogs	11	335,818	44,106	22,761	36,764	30,529	▼6,235	65,584	61,717	
Total/overall	198	7,503,081	92,231	5,814	37,306	37,894	▲588	1,363,437		

Source: AFL Tables

== Finals series ==
Wildcard finals
29 August, Melbourne Cricket Ground
7	Melbourne	7.13 (55)
10	Carlton	10.14 (74)
28 August, Melbourne Cricket Ground
8	Western Bulldogs	14.12 (96)
9	Collingwood	14.9 (93)

Qualifying and elimination finals
3 September, Optus Stadium
1	Fremantle	5.10 (40)
4	Hawthorn	10.12 (72)
4 September, Melbourne Cricket Ground
5	Geelong	14.23 (107)
Carlton	11.8 (74)
5 September, Adelaide Oval
6	Adelaide	14.6 (90)
Western Bulldogs	9.14 (68)
5 September, Sydney Cricket Ground
2	Sydney	21.15 (141)
3	Brisbane Lions	13.10 (88)

Semi-finals
11 September, Optus Stadium
Fremantle	18.12 (120)
Geelong	16.10 (106)
12 September, the Gabba
Brisbane Lions	21.18 (144)
Adelaide	13.13 (91)

Preliminary finals
19 September, Melbourne Cricket Ground
Hawthorn	19.8 (122)
Brisbane Lions	20.11 (131)
18 September, Sydney Cricket Ground
Sydney	10.11 (71)
Fremantle	12.11 (83)

Grand final
26 September, Melbourne Cricket Ground
Fremantle	12.17 (89)
Brisbane Lions	14.12 (96)

All starting times are local time. Source: afl.com.au

=== Finals week 1 ===
Second wildcard final
Friday, 28 August (7:40 pm)	Western Bulldogs 14.12 (96)	def.	Collingwood 14.9 (93)	Melbourne Cricket Ground (crowd: 81,036)	Report; Stats
4.1 (25); 7.6 (48); 10.8 (68); 14.12 (96)	Q1; Q2; Q3; Q4	4.0 (24); 6.2 (38); 8.8 (56); 14.9 (93)
Jones 4, Naughton 4, Weightman 2, Bontempelli, Davidson, M. Kennedy, Richards	Goals	McStay 4, Anderson 2, N. Daicos 2, Cameron, Crisp, De Goey, Long, Membrey, C. West
Bontempelli, Jones, Naughton, M. Kennedy, Dale, Freijah	Best	N. Daicos, McStay, McCreery, Swadling, Lipinski, J. Daicos
Tim Membrey (Collingwood) had a shot at goal after the final siren to win the wildcard final against the Western Bulldogs, but kicked a behind.

First wildcard final
Saturday, 29 August (7:35 pm)	Melbourne 7.13 (55)	def. by	Carlton 10.14 (74)	Melbourne Cricket Ground (crowd: 91,733)	Report; Stats
4.3 (27); 5.6 (36); 7.10 (52); 7.13 (55)	Q1; Q2; Q3; Q4	1.3 (9); 5.5 (35); 8.8 (56); 10.14 (74)
Fritsch, Gawn, Langford, Laurie, McDonald, Petty, Sharp	Goals	Ainsworth 3, McKay 2, Smith 2, Cripps, O. Hollands, Kemp
Gawn, Langford, Chandler, Sparrow	Best	Smith, Walsh, O. Hollands, Ainsworth, Evans, Cripps

=== Finals week 2 ===
First qualifying final
Thursday, 3 September (6:10 pm)	Fremantle 5.10 (40)	def. by	Hawthorn 10.12 (72)	Optus Stadium (crowd: 59,466)	Report; Stats
1.3 (9); 1.4 (10); 4.7 (31); 5.10 (40)	Q1; Q2; Q3; Q4	4.4 (28); 6.7 (43); 9.10 (64); 10.12 (72)
Amiss, Brayshaw, Jackson, Switkowski, Treacy	Goals	Gunston 2, Moore 2, Watson 2, Chol, Ginnivan, Lewis, Morrison
Clark, Brayshaw, Erasmus, Worner	Best	Sicily, Day, Battle, Watson, D'Ambrosio, Newcombe

First elimination final
Friday, 4 September (7:40 pm)	Geelong 14.23 (107)	def.	Carlton 11.8 (74)	Melbourne Cricket Ground (crowd: 96,680)	Report; Stats
1.5 (11); 4.10 (34); 10.13 (73); 14.23 (107)	Q1; Q2; Q3; Q4	4.3 (27); 5.7 (37); 7.8 (50); 11.8 (74)
Dangerfield 5, Miers 2, Neale 2, Close, O. Henry, Holmes, Mannagh, Polkinghorne	Goals	Evans 2, Kemp 2, Lord 2, Ainsworth, Cottrell, Cripps, O. Hollands, McKay
Mannagh, Dangerfield, B. Smith, Wiltshire, Stewart, J. Henry	Best	J. Smith, Walsh, Cripps, Wilson, Pittonet, Cowan
The crowd of 96,680 for the Geelong v Carlton elimination final was the largest crowd for a match between the two clubs since 1962.

Second qualifying final
Saturday, 5 September (3:15 pm)	Sydney 21.15 (141)	def.	Brisbane Lions 13.10 (88)	Sydney Cricket Ground (crowd: 37,261)	Report; Stats
6.6 (42); 10.8 (68); 16.13 (109); 21.15 (141)	Q1; Q2; Q3; Q4	2.4 (16); 5.8 (38); 9.9 (63); 13.10 (88)
McDonald 6, Curnow 5, Papley 5, McLean 3, Gulden, Roberts	Goals	Allen 4, Hipwood 2, Morris 2, L. Ashcroft, Berry, Draper, Dunkley, McKenna
Gulden, McDonald, Papley, Curnow, Cunningham, Rowbottom	Best	Dunkley, Allen, Hipwood, Wilmot
Sydney's final score of 21.15 (141) against the Brisbane Lions was its highest in a final.

Second elimination final
Saturday, 5 September (7:05 pm)	Adelaide 14.6 (90)	def.	Western Bulldogs 9.14 (68)	Adelaide Oval (crowd: 51,370)	Report; Stats
3.1 (19); 7.2 (44); 9.5 (59); 14.6 (90)	Q1; Q2; Q3; Q4	1.7 (13); 5.8 (38); 5.10 (40); 9.14 (68)
Rachele 3, Cook 2, Fogarty 2, Keays 2, Rankine 2, Ah Chee, Thilthorpe, Walker	Goals	A. Jones 2, Lewis 2, Richards 2, Freijah, Naughton, Sanders
Worrell, Milera, Rankine, Rachele, Dawson, Fogarty, Cook	Best	Richards, Freijah, Bontempelli, Williams, Hynes

=== Finals week 3 ===
First semi-final
Friday, 11 September (6:10 pm)	Fremantle 18.12 (120)	def.	Geelong 16.10 (106)	Optus Stadium (crowd: 59,725)	Report; Stats
6.2 (38); 10.5 (65); 15.6 (96); 18.12 (120)	Q1; Q2; Q3; Q4	2.1 (13); 7.2 (44); 12.8 (80); 16.10 (106)
Voss 4, Amiss 2, Bolton 2, Dudley 2, Frederick 2, Jackson 2, M. Cox, Serong, Treacy, Young	Goals	O. Henry 5, Neale 3, Cameron 2, Dangerfield 2, Mannagh 2, Stewart, Wiltshire
Jackson, Bolton, Young, Treacy, Reid, Brayshaw, Serong	Best	O. Henry, Smith, Humphries, Neale, Dangerfield, Mannagh

Second semi-final
Saturday, 12 September (7:35 pm)	Brisbane Lions 21.18 (144)	def.	Adelaide 13.13 (91)	The Gabba (crowd: 36,026)	Report; Stats
6.6 (42); 10.12 (72); 16.15 (111); 21.18 (144)	Q1; Q2; Q3; Q4	2.3 (15); 5.4 (34); 7.9 (51); 13.13 (91)
Cameron 5, Bailey 3, Hipwood 2, Lohmann 2, McCluggage 2, Morris 2, Rayner 2, L. Ashcroft, McKenna, Zorko	Goals	Fogarty 2, Keays 2, Thilthorpe 2, Walker 2, Curtin, Nankervis, Milera, Neal-Bullen, Rachele
W. Ashcroft, Bailey, Zorko, Dunkley, Rayner, Cameron	Best	Dawson, Berry, Curtin, Hall-Kahan, Taylor

=== Finals week 4 ===
Second preliminary final
Friday, 18 September (7:40 pm)	Sydney 10.11 (71)	def. by	Fremantle 12.11 (83)	Sydney Cricket Ground (crowd: 45,129)	Report; Stats
4.5 (29); 7.6 (48); 10.10 (70); 10.11 (71)	Q1; Q2; Q3; Q4	2.1 (13); 4.5 (29); 7.7 (49); 12.11 (83)
L. McDonald 3, Campbell, Cleary, Curnow, Hanily, McInerney, Papley, Sheldrick	Goals	Bolton 2, Dudley 2, Jackson 2, Amiss, M. Cox, Erasmus, Frederick, Voss, Young
L. McDonald, Gulden, J. Serong, Grundy, Rowbottom	Best	Young, Jackson, Brayshaw, Bolton, Dudley, C. Serong
Fremantle trailed by 21 points at three-quarter time of the preliminary final against Sydney and went on to win, recording its biggest comeback from a three-quarter time deficit.

First preliminary final
Saturday, 19 September (5:15 pm)	Hawthorn 19.8 (122)	def. by	Brisbane Lions 20.11 (131)	Melbourne Cricket Ground (crowd: 97,835)	Report; Stats
5.1 (31); 11.1 (67); 12.5 (77); 19.8 (122)	Q1; Q2; Q3; Q4	5.2 (32); 8.5 (53); 15.7 (97); 20.11 (131)
Watson 6, Gunston 5, Lewis 4, Chol, Moore, Sicily, Weddle	Goals	Lohmann 5, Cameron 3, Hipwood 3, McCluggage 3, Morris 2, L. Ashcroft, W. Ashcroft, Berry, McKenna
Watson, Ward, D'Ambrosio, Gunston, Sicily, Barrass	Best	W. Ashcroft, Lohmann, Neale, Dunkley, Andrews, McCluggage
The crowd of 97,835 for the Hawthorn v Brisbane Lions preliminary final was the largest crowd for a match between the two clubs.; Hawthorn's final score of 19.8 (122) against the Brisbane Lions was the highest losing score in a preliminary final.

=== Grand final ===
Grand final
Saturday, 26 September (2:30 pm)	Fremantle 12.17 (89)	def. by	Brisbane Lions 14.12 (96)	Melbourne Cricket Ground (crowd: 100,023)	Report; Stats
3.4 (22); 6.7 (43); 10.12 (72); 12.17 (89)	Q1; Q2; Q3; Q4	3.5 (23); 6.7 (43); 9.8 (62); 14.12 (96)	Norm Smith Medal: Shai Bolton (Fremantle); Field umpires: Nick Foot, Brendan Hosking, Hayden Meyer, Brett Rosebury; National anthem: Michael Paynter
Voss 3, Amiss 2, Dudley 2, Young 2, Frederick, Reid, Treacy	Goals	Cameron 3, Morris 3, Allen 2, Lohmann 2, L. Ashcroft, Bailey, Draper, McKenna
Serong, Young, Voss, Reid, Jackson, Bolton	Best	Dunkley, W. Ashcroft, Zorko, Cameron, Wilmot, Gallop, Lohmann
The crowd of 100,023 for the grand final was the largest crowd for a grand final featuring two non-Victorian clubs.; Shai Bolton (Fremantle) was the first player since 2005 to win the Norm Smith Medal in a losing grand final team.; The grand final was the most-watched television program of 2026, averaging 6.5 million viewers across the Seven Network and 7plus, and the most-watched grand final in VFL/AFL history.

== Win–loss table ==
The following table can be sorted from biggest winning margin to biggest losing margin for each round. If multiple matches in a round are decided by the same margin, these margins are sorted by percentage (i.e. the lowest-scoring winning team is ranked highest and the lowest-scoring losing team is ranked lowest). (Note: In the case of round 13, in which two matches produced the same final scores, the winners of those matches are sorted alphabetically; in the case of round 23, which produced two draws (where the away team would be ranked higher), the away teams are sorted alphabetically.) Home matches are in bold, neutral matches (Gather Round) are underlined and opponents are listed above the margins.

+	Win		Qualified for finals
−	Loss		Eliminated
	Draw	X	Bye

Team	Home-and-away season																									Ladder	Finals series				
Team	O	1	2	3	4	5	6	7	8	9	10	11	12	13	14	15	16	17	18	19	20	21	22	23	24	Ladder	F1	F2	F3	F4	GF
Adelaide	X	COL +14	**WB** **–6**	GEE –8	**FRE** **–2**	CAR +28	**STK** **+1**	BL –52	**PA** **+1**	RIC +37	**NM** **+68**	HAW –9	X	**GEE** **+1**	WB +57	**MEL** **+17**	PA –26	WC +25	**GC** **+79**	SYD +16	**COL** **–34**	ESS +72	**RIC** **+9**	FRE –24	**GWS** **+56**	6 (15–8–0)	X	**WB** **+22**	BL –53		
Brisbane Lions	**WB** **–5**	SYD –44	X	STK +33	**COL** **+54**	NM +26	MEL –2	**ADE** **+52**	ESS +64	**CAR** **+11**	**GEE** **–41**	GWS –78	**FRE** **–25**	GC +31	RIC +35	X	**SYD** **+43**	GEE +23	**ESS** **+90**	WC +24	**PA** **+59**	CAR –76	**HAW** **+67**	**GC** **+42**	COL +63	3 (16–7–0)	X	SYD –53	**ADE** **+53**	HAW +9	FRE +7
Carlton	SYD –63	**RIC** **+4**	X	**MEL** **–23**	NM –10	ADE –28	**COL** **–5**	FRE –14	**STK** **–39**	BL –11	**WB** **+12**	PA +34	**GEE** **+4**	ESS +5	X	GWS +23	**WC** **+53**	RIC +2	**HAW** **–64**	COL –21	**GC** **+13**	**BL** **+76**	STK +44	WB; 0	**FRE** **+37**	10 (12–10–1)	MEL +19	GEE –33			
Collingwood	STK +12	**ADE** **–14**	X	**GWS** **+33**	BL –54	FRE –6	CAR +5	ESS +77	**HAW**; **0**	GEE –54	SYD –6	**WC** **+10**	WB –4	**MEL** **–8**	X	**PA** **+26**	**RIC** **+34**	GC +6	**NM** **+4**	**CAR** **+21**	ADE +34	**GEE** **–25**	WC +19	HAW; 0	**BL** **–63**	9 (12–9–2)	WB –3				
Essendon	X	**HAW** **–62**	PA –63	**NM** **–12**	WB –34	MEL +45	GC –9	**COL** **–77**	**BL** **–64**	GWS –14	**FRE** **–43**	RIC –18	WC –30	**CAR** **–5**	MEL –45	X	NM –14	**STK** **–67**	BL –90	**GWS** **+3**	HAW –93	**ADE** **–72**	GEE –67	**SYD** **–36**	**PA** **–10**	18 (2–21–0)					
Fremantle	X	GEE –10	**MEL** **+48**	**RIC** **+60**	ADE +2	COL +6	WC +56	**CAR** **+14**	WB +12	**HAW** **+15**	ESS +43	**STK** **+30**	BL +25	NM +124	X	**GEE** **+9**	**GC** **+51**	GWS –21	**SYD** **+38**	PA +28	**WC** **+70**	**WB** **+37**	MEL –4	**ADE** **+24**	CAR –37	1 (19–4–0)	X	**HAW** **–32**	**GEE** **+14**	SYD +12	**BL** **–7**
Geelong	GC –56	**FRE** **+10**	X	**ADE** **+8**	HAW –1	WC +46	**WB** **+75**	PA –30	**NM** **+49**	**COL** **+54**	BL +41	**SYD** **+27**	CAR –4	ADE –1	**GC** **+45**	FRE –9	X	**BL** **–23**	GWS –13	**STK** **+27**	MEL +20	COL +25	**ESS** **+67**	NM +15	**RIC** **+57**	5 (15–8–0)	X	**CAR** **+33**	FRE –14		
Gold Coast	**GEE** **+56**	**WC** **+59**	RIC +68	X	MEL –20	SYD –32	**ESS** **+9**	HAW –49	**GWS** **+20**	**STK** **+29**	**PA** **+25**	NM –6	X	**BL** **–31**	GEE –45	**HAW** **–16**	FRE –51	**COL** **–6**	ADE –79	**WB** **–9**	CAR –13	**MEL** **–9**	GWS +2	BL –42	STK +23	13 (9–14–0)					
Greater Western Sydney	**HAW** **+27**	WB –81	**STK** **–4**	COL –33	X	RIC +56	SYD –41	**NM** **+7**	GC –20	**ESS** **+14**	WC –17	**BL** **+78**	MEL +49	X	STK –8	**CAR** **–23**	HAW –14	**FRE** **+21**	**GEE** **+13**	ESS –3	**SYD** **–51**	PA +12	**GC** **–2**	**WC** **+54**	ADE –56	12 (10–13–0)					
Hawthorn	GWS –27	ESS +62	**SYD** **+17**	X	**GEE** **+1**	WB +40	**PA** **+3**	**GC** **+49**	COL; 0	FRE –15	MEL –39	**ADE** **+9**	STK +52	**WB** **–6**	X	GC +16	**GWS** **+14**	**MEL** **–35**	CAR +64	RIC +70	**ESS** **+93**	**NM** **+16**	BL –67	**COL**; **0**	WC +62	4 (15–6–2)	X	FRE +32	X	**BL** **–9**	
Melbourne	X	**STK** **+13**	FRE –48	CAR +23	**GC** **+20**	ESS –45	**BL** **+2**	RIC +54	SYD –17	**WC** **+32**	**HAW** **+39**	WB –3	**GWS** **–49**	COL +8	**ESS** **+45**	ADE –17	X	HAW +35	**RIC** **+46**	NM +16	**GEE** **–20**	GC +9	**FRE** **+4**	PA +76	**WB** **–21**	7 (15–8–0)	**CAR** **–19**				
North Melbourne	X	**PA** **+46**	WC –17	ESS +12	**CAR** **+10**	BL –26	**RIC** **+75**	GWS –7	GEE –49	**SYD** **–8**	ADE –68	**GC** **+6**	X	**FRE** **–124**	**WC** **+1**	RIC +25	**ESS** **+14**	PA –21	COL –4	**MEL** **–16**	**STK** **–31**	HAW –16	WB +23	**GEE** **–15**	SYD –53	14 (9–14–0)					
Port Adelaide	X	NM –46	**ESS** **+63**	**WC** **–2**	RIC +42	STK –14	HAW –3	**GEE** **+30**	ADE –1	**WB** **–2**	GC –25	**CAR** **–34**	X	WC +6	**SYD** **–3**	COL –26	**ADE** **+26**	**NM** **+21**	STK –14	**FRE** **–28**	BL –59	**GWS** **–12**	SYD –97	**MEL** **–76**	ESS +10	15 (7–16–0)					
Richmond	X	CAR –4	**GC** **–68**	FRE –60	**PA** **–42**	GWS –56	NM –75	**MEL** **–54**	WC +11	**ADE** **–37**	STK –36	**ESS** **+18**	SYD –114	X	**BL** **–35**	**NM** **–25**	COL –34	**CAR** **–2**	MEL –46	**HAW** **–70**	WB –57	**WC** **+11**	ADE –9	**STK** **–49**	GEE –57	17 (3–20–0)					
St Kilda	**COL** **–12**	MEL –13	GWS +4	**BL** **–33**	X	PA +14	ADE –1	**WC** **+101**	CAR +39	GC –29	**RIC** **+36**	FRE –30	**HAW** **–52**	SYD –2	**GWS** **+8**	**WB** **–22**	X	ESS +67	**PA** **+14**	GEE –27	NM +31	**SYD** **–19**	**CAR** **–44**	RIC +49	**GC** **–23**	11 (10–13–0)					
Sydney	**CAR** **+63**	**BL** **+44**	HAW –17	X	WC +128	GC +32	**GWS** **+53**	WB +66	**MEL** **+17**	NM +8	**COL** **+6**	GEE –27	**RIC** **+114**	**STK** **+2**	PA +3	X	BL –43	**WB** **+35**	FRE –38	**ADE** **–16**	GWS +51	STK +19	**PA** **+97**	ESS +36	**NM** **+53**	2 (18–5–0)	X	**BL** **+53**	X	**FRE** **–12**	
West Coast	X	GC –59	**NM** **+17**	PA +2	**SYD** **–128**	GEE –46	**FRE** **–56**	STK –101	**RIC** **–11**	MEL –32	**GWS** **+17**	COL –10	**ESS** **+30**	**PA** **–6**	NM –1	X	CAR –53	**ADE** **–25**	WB –16	**BL** **–24**	FRE –70	RIC –11	**COL** **–19**	GWS –54	**HAW** **–62**	16 (4–19–0)					
Western Bulldogs	BL +5	**GWS** **+81**	ADE +6	X	**ESS** **+34**	HAW –40	GEE –75	**SYD** **–66**	**FRE** **–12**	PA +2	CAR –12	**MEL** **+3**	**COL** **+4**	HAW +6	**ADE** **–57**	STK +22	X	SYD –35	**WC** **+16**	GC +9	**RIC** **+57**	FRE –37	**NM** **–23**	**CAR**; **0**	MEL +21	8 (13–9–1)	**COL** **+3**	ADE –22			

Source: AFL Tables

== Season notes ==
- In round 13, the AFL recorded a combined attendance of 390,752, the highest for an eight-match home-and-away round in VFL/AFL history; the round also saw a total television viewership of over 7.2 million, the highest viewership for a home-and-away round in VFL/AFL history despite only eight matches being played.
- Fremantle won 14 consecutive matches during the season, breaking West Coast's record of 12 in 1991 for the longest winning streak of the Western Australia-based AFL clubs.
- Fremantle recorded crowds of over 50,000 in nine consecutive home matches during the home-and-away season, a VFL/AFL record.
- Collingwood and Hawthorn drew both of their home-and-away match-ups, becoming the first clubs in VFL/AFL history to do so in the same season; both matches ended with shots at goal at or after the final siren by Dylan Moore (Hawthorn) and produced almost identical scorelines: 93–93 in round 8 and 92–92 in round 23.
- Essendon won two matches during the home-and-away season, the equal-fewest in the club's history. (Note: Essendon also won two matches in the 1933 VFL season, albeit in a shorter home-and-away season.)
- New records for combined (7,772,015) and average attendance (37,545) were set during the home-and-away season, along with new records for combined crowds in Western Australia, South Australia and Queensland.

== Notable events ==
- Effective 1 May, insurer Zurich Insurance Group ceased coverage for concussion-related brain injuries including chronic traumatic encephalopathy, as well as reducing the maximum TPD payouts, for Australian rules footballers. The changes came after a renewal of the existing policy, during which Zurich's reduced offer was the only tender received. This left players able only to access $600,000 lump sums from the AFL Players Association's Hardship Fund as coverage for concussion-related injuries. Melbourne, who were sponsored by Zurich, later dropped them as a sponsor.
- In August, it was first publicly revealed that Geelong defender Jake Kolodjashnij had signed a waiver in 2024, absolving the club from liability in the event of future concussions. Kolodjashnij had suffered several concussions over the prior few seasons, and he had been cleared as medically fit to play by the AFL's independent medical panel; and he and the club came to the waiver agreement while negotiating his two-year contract extension covering the 2025–2026 period. Following its review, the AFL fined Geelong $100,000 – as well as triggering the payment of an existing unrelated $40,000 suspended fine – for entering into an unauthorised variation to a player's contract and failing to lodge the document with the league and the AFLPA. Kolodjashnij did not play another match (neither senior nor reserves) after the waiver became public knowledge, and he was medically retired at the end of the season.
- Five Sydney players, Riley Bice, Nick Blakey, Isaac Heeney, James Jordon and Chad Warner, were suspended by the club for the remainder of the season on 19 August, for breaching club standards in an incident at an East Melbourne hotel that succeeded the club's 36-point victory over Essendon in round 23. The matter was subsequently investigated as a sexual assault, after three women made complaints to Victoria Police in connection with the incident; Bice was cleared as a suspect in September, having been treated as a witness alongside retired teammate Taylor Adams; and police announced on November 13 that no criminal charges would be laid on the remaining four players.

== Milestones ==
Round	Player/official	Club	Milestone
OR	Isaac Heeney	Sydney	300th AFL goal
OR	Jesse Hogan	Greater Western Sydney	400th AFL goal
OR	Rory Lobb	Western Bulldogs	200th AFL game
1	Blake Hardwick	Hawthorn	200th AFL game
1	Daniel McStay	Collingwood	200th AFL game
1	Darcy Fogarty	Adelaide	200th AFL goal
1	Christian Salem	Melbourne	200th AFL game
3	Jake Stringer	Greater Western Sydney	400th AFL goal
3	Max Gawn	Melbourne	250th AFL game
3	Tom McDonald	Melbourne	250th AFL game
4	Tom Papley	Sydney	200th AFL game
4	Aaron Naughton	Western Bulldogs	300th AFL goal
5	Jake Melksham	Melbourne	250th AFL game
6	Mark Blicavs	Geelong	300th AFL game
6	Jake Kolodjashnij	Geelong	200th AFL game
6	Karl Amon	Hawthorn	200th AFL game
6	Josh Dunkley	Brisbane Lions	200th AFL game
6	Lachie Neale	Brisbane Lions	300th AFL game
6	Shai Bolton	Fremantle	200th AFL goal
7	Bayley Fritsch	Melbourne	300th AFL goal
8	Nick Larkey	North Melbourne	300th AFL goal
8	Brodie Grundy	Sydney	250th AFL game
9	Tom Stewart	Geelong	200th AFL game
9	Daniel McStay	Collingwood	200th AFL goal
10	Zac Bailey	Brisbane Lions	200th AFL goal
11	Jayden Short	Richmond	200th AFL game
11	Dan Houston	Collingwood	200th AFL game
13	Jacob Mollison	—	400th AFL game umpired
14	Harris Andrews	Brisbane Lions	250th AFL game
14	Eric Hipwood	Brisbane Lions	200th AFL game
15	Jake Lever	Melbourne	200th AFL game
16	Mitch Georgiades	Port Adelaide	200th AFL goal
17	Ben King	Gold Coast	300th AFL goal
17	Ollie Florent	Carlton	200th AFL game
18	Will Hayward	Carlton	200th AFL game
19	Dion Prestia	Richmond	250th AFL game
19	Tom Lynch	Richmond	500th AFL goal
20	Jordan De Goey	Collingwood	200th AFL game
20	Taylor Walker	Adelaide	700th AFL goal
20	Jack Gunston	Hawthorn	600th AFL goal
21	Patrick Cripps	Carlton	250th AFL game
21	Nick Haynes	Carlton	250th AFL game
22	Ryan Lester	Brisbane Lions	250th AFL game
22	Jarrod Berry	Brisbane Lions	200th AFL game
22	Harry McKay	Carlton	300th AFL goal
23	Luke Ryan	Fremantle	200th AFL game
23	Tom Lynch	Richmond	250th AFL game
23	James Sicily	Hawthorn	200th AFL game
23	Aliir Aliir	Port Adelaide	200th AFL game
24	Bradley Hill	St Kilda	300th AFL game
24	Eric Hipwood	Brisbane Lions	300th AFL goal
24	Jake Stringer	Greater Western Sydney	250th AFL game
24	Andrew McGrath	Essendon	200th AFL game
24	Jack Gunston	Hawthorn	300th AFL game

Source: AFL Tables (players); other milestones sourced individually

== Coach departures ==
Outgoing coach	Club	Manner of departure	Date of departure	Caretaker coach	Incoming coach	Date of appointment
Michael Voss	Carlton	Resigned	12 May 2026	Josh Fraser	Josh Fraser	18 August 2026
Brad Scott	Essendon	Dismissed with a year and a half remaining on contract	26 May 2026	Dean Solomon	Mark McVeigh	24 August 2026
Alastair Clarkson	North Melbourne	Dismissed with a year remaining on contract	2 September 2026	—	Jaymie Graham	6 October 2026
Chris Fagan	Brisbane Lions	Retired with a year remaining on contract	1 October 2026	—	Cameron Bruce	9 November 2026

== Awards ==
=== Major awards ===
- The Coleman Medal was awarded to Sydney's Charlie Curnow; he kicked 69 goals to claim his third Coleman Medal, and become the first player since Lance Franklin in 2014 to win the medal in his first season at a new club.
- The AFL Rising Star was awarded to Carlton's Jagga Smith.
- The Leigh Matthews Trophy, awarded to the AFL Players Association's most valuable player throughout the season, was awarded to Collingwood's Nick Daicos, for the second successive year.
- The AFL Coaches Association Champion Player of the Year was awarded to Collingwood's Nick Daicos, who polled 147 votes, the most ever recorded in the award's history.

=== Leading goalkickers ===
1	Led the goalkicking at the end of the round
1	Led the goalkicking at the end of the home-and-away season
1_{1}	Subscript indicates the player's goal tally to that point of the season
–	Did not play during that round
X	Had a bye during that round

#	Player	Club	Home-and-away season (Coleman Medal)																									Finals series					Total	Games	Average
#	Player	Club	O	1	2	3	4	5	6	7	8	9	10	11	12	13	14	15	16	17	18	19	20	21	22	23	24	F1	F2	F3	F4	GF	Total	Games	Average
1	Charlie Curnow	Sydney	3_{3}	0_{3}	2_{5}	X_{5}	4_{9}	0_{9}	3_{12}	7_{19}	1_{20}	–_{21}	1_{21}	2_{23}	8_{31}	2_{33}	3_{36}	X_{36}	3_{39}	6_{45}	5_{50}	0_{50}	4_{54}	3_{57}	5_{62}	4_{66}	3_{69}	X_{69}	5_{74}	X_{74}	1_{75}		75	24	3.13
2	Logan Morris	Brisbane Lions	3_{3}	–_{3}	X_{3}	2_{5}	3_{8}	0_{8}	3_{11}	2_{13}	4_{17}	4_{21}	2_{23}	1_{24}	1_{25}	7_{32}	3_{35}	X_{35}	3_{38}	3_{41}	2_{43}	1_{44}	3_{47}	0_{47}	4_{51}	4_{55}	8_{63}	X_{63}	2_{65}	2_{67}	2_{69}	3_{72}	72	26	2.77
3	Jack Gunston	Hawthorn	4_{4}	5_{9}	4_{13}	X_{13}	3_{16}	3_{19}	–_{19}	5_{24}	0_{24}	6_{30}	–_{30}	–_{30}	5_{35}	–_{35}	X_{35}	–_{35}	–_{35}	1_{36}	3_{39}	1_{40}	7_{47}	2_{49}	3_{52}	2_{54}	5_{59}	X_{59}	2_{61}	X_{61}	5_{66}		66	19	3.47
4	Jye Amiss	Fremantle	X_{0}	1_{1}	0_{1}	2_{3}	4_{7}	2_{9}	5_{14}	3_{17}	0_{17}	3_{20}	2_{22}	4_{26}	4_{30}	2_{32}	X_{32}	3_{35}	1_{36}	1_{37}	2_{39}	4_{43}	5_{48}	0_{48}	5_{53}	5_{58}	–_{58}	X_{58}	1_{59}	2_{61}	1_{62}	2_{64}	64	26	2.46
5	Nick Watson	Hawthorn	2_{2}	4_{6}	1_{7}	X_{7}	3_{10}	1_{11}	5_{16}	2_{18}	2_{20}	3_{23}	3_{26}	2_{28}	2_{30}	3_{33}	X_{33}	3_{36}	3_{39}	–_{39}	–_{39}	5_{44}	3_{47}	5_{52}	0_{52}	0_{52}	3_{55}	X_{55}	2_{57}	X_{57}	6_{63}		63	23	2.74
6	Charlie Cameron	Brisbane Lions	4_{4}	2_{6}	X_{6}	2_{8}	0_{8}	1_{9}	3_{12}	4_{16}	2_{18}	2_{20}	3_{23}	2_{25}	2_{27}	2_{29}	1_{30}	X_{30}	2_{32}	2_{34}	2_{36}	2_{38}	3_{41}	2_{43}	3_{46}	2_{48}	2_{50}	X_{50}	0_{50}	5_{55}	3_{58}	3_{61}	61	27	2.26
7	Ben King	Gold Coast	4_{4}	5_{9}	7_{16}	X_{16}	3_{19}	2_{21}	3_{24}	2_{26}	2_{28}	4_{32}	1_{33}	1_{34}	X_{34}	4_{38}	3_{41}	1_{42}	1_{43}	3_{46}	1_{47}	1_{48}	3_{51}	2_{53}	2_{55}	2_{57}	3_{60}						60	23	2.61
8	Josh Treacy	Fremantle	X_{0}	2_{2}	4_{6}	4_{10}	2_{12}	0_{12}	1_{13}	3_{16}	3_{19}	2_{21}	2_{23}	2_{25}	3_{28}	4_{32}	X_{32}	2_{34}	0_{34}	3_{37}	4_{41}	3_{44}	1_{45}	3_{48}	2_{50}	1_{51}	3_{54}	X_{54}	1_{55}	1_{56}	0_{56}	1_{57}	57	27	2.11
9	Kai Lohmann	Brisbane Lions	2_{2}	1_{3}	X_{3}	2_{5}	4_{9}	1_{10}	1_{11}	1_{12}	4_{16}	2_{18}	0_{18}	3_{21}	0_{21}	0_{21}	1_{22}	X_{22}	2_{24}	5_{29}	3_{32}	4_{36}	3_{39}	2_{41}	5_{46}	0_{46}	0_{46}	X_{46}	0_{46}	2_{48}	5_{53}	2_{55}	55	27	2.04
10	Shannon Neale	Geelong	1_{1}	5_{6}	X_{6}	0_{6}	4_{10}	2_{12}	1_{13}	2_{15}	3_{18}	2_{20}	2_{22}	0_{22}	0_{22}	1_{23}	2_{25}	2_{27}	X_{27}	3_{30}	0_{30}	1_{31}	5_{36}	2_{38}	3_{41}	2_{43}	4_{47}	X_{47}	2_{49}	3_{52}			52	25	2.08

Source: AFL Tables

=== Club best and fairest ===
Player(s)	Club	Award	Ref.
Jordan Dawson	Adelaide	Malcolm Blight Medal	
Will Ashcroft	Brisbane Lions	Merrett–Murray Medal	
Sam Walsh	Carlton	John Nicholls Medal	
Nick Daicos	Collingwood	Copeland Trophy	
Zach Merrett	Essendon	Crichton Medal	
Luke Jackson	Fremantle	Doig Medal	
Bailey Smith	Geelong	Carji Greeves Medal	
Bodhi Uwland	Gold Coast	Club Champion	
Lachie Ash	Greater Western Sydney	Kevin Sheedy Medal	
Nick Watson	Hawthorn	Peter Crimmins Medal	
Max Gawn	Melbourne	Keith 'Bluey' Truscott Trophy	
Harry Sheezel	North Melbourne	Syd Barker Medal	
Jason Horne-Francis	Port Adelaide	John Cahill Medal	
Tim Taranto	Richmond	Jack Dyer Medal	
Callum Wilkie	St Kilda	Trevor Barker Award	
Isaac Heeney	Sydney	Bob Skilton Medal	
Harley Reid	West Coast	John Worsfold Medal	
Marcus Bontempelli	Western Bulldogs	Charles Sutton Medal	

== See also ==
- 2026 AFL Women's season
