= Nick Foot =

Australian rules football umpire

Nicholas Foot is an Australian rules football umpire currently officiating in the Australian Football League (AFL). He has umpired in two AFL grand finals.

== Umpiring career ==
Foot began umpiring as a 13-year-old. In 2010, he won the AFL/Australian Sports Commission All-Australian Umpire award. As the winner of this award, he travelled with the Australian Under-18 squad to officiate their games in Italy, Turkey and the United Kingdom.

Foot followed up his 2009 grand final appearance with appointments to the 2010 and 2011 Tasmanian State League grand finals. He spent 2011 as an AFL rookie umpire, officiating in matches in the NAB Cup. In 2012, he was elevated to the full AFL list. Foot was selected to umpire his first AFL grand final in 2024 as a field umpire.

During a match at Adelaide Oval on 12 April 2026 as part of Gather Round, Foot reported Port Adelaide player Zak Butters to the AFL Tribunal, after he allegedly asked "How much are they paying you?" during the club's loss to St Kilda. Butters denied the allegation, with the AFL stating the exchange was not heard by the umpire's microphone. At the ensuing tribunal hearing, Foot said "I'm 100 per cent adamant that those are the words Zak Butters said to me. When your integrity is questioned you don't forget those words that are said to you." Butters was initially found guilty and fined $1,500. The charge was later dismissed at appeal due to juror misconduct, after a tribunal member used Zoom to appear at the tribunal while driving to a work appointment.

From 2025 until 2026, Foot featured on Get On on Racing.com as part of his employment with online bookmaker Sportsbet. His involvement with the bookmaker was controversial given his position as an umpire, but was approved by the AFL at the time as having no conflict of interest owing to his role being specific to horse racing and not involving football. Foot left Sportsbet in May 2026, soon after the incident with Butters, and Sportsbet tightened its conflict of interest guidelines to exclude any serving sports officials and administrators from its programming.

Foot umpired in the 2026 AFL Grand Final at the end of the season.
