= Sam Draper =

Australian football league player

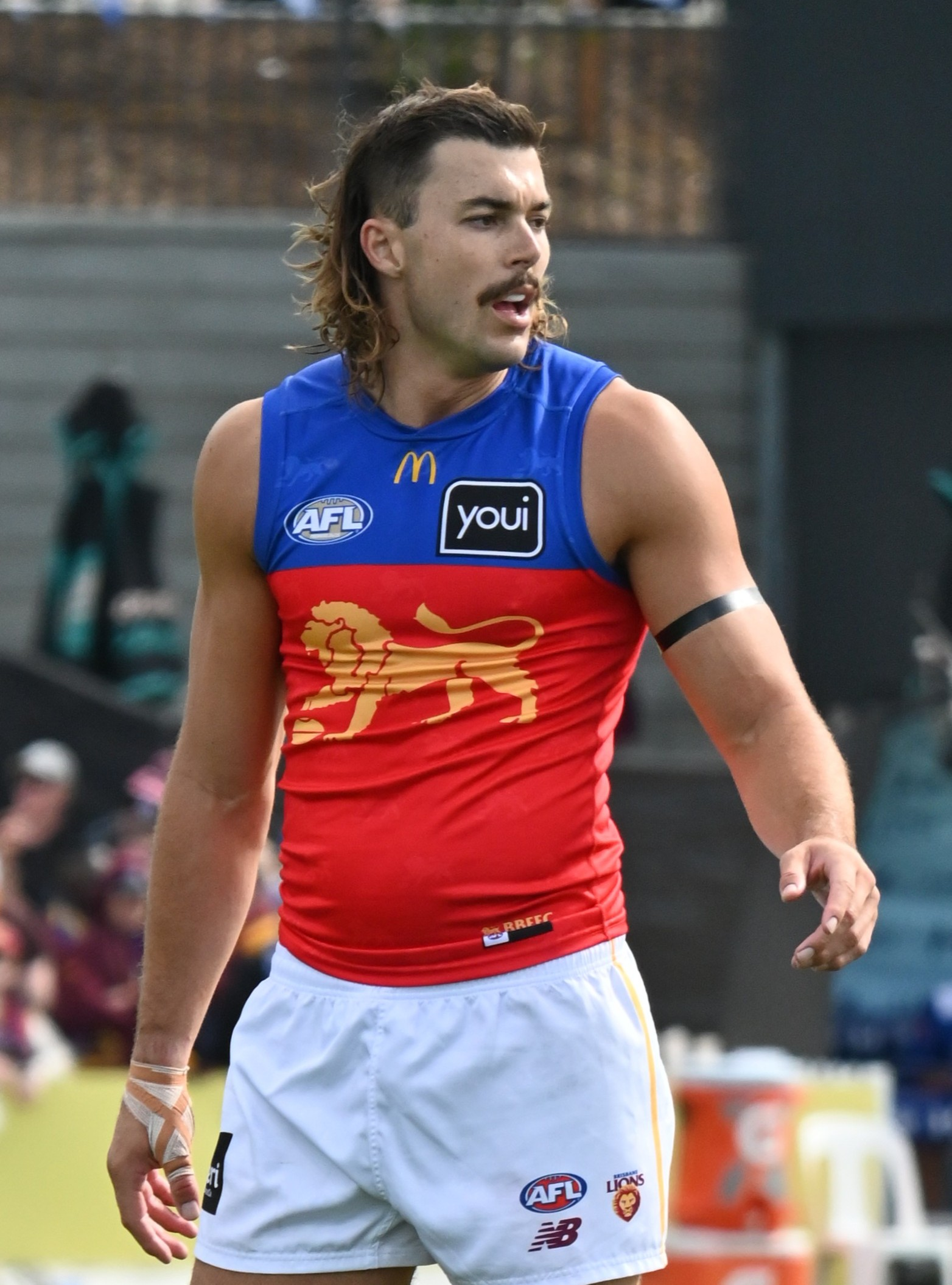
- Draper in April 2026

Personal information
- Full name: Sam Draper
- Nicknames: Drapes, The Mullet
- Born: 28 September 1998 (age 28); South Australia
- Original team: South Adelaide (SANFL)
- Draft: No. 1, 2017 AFL rookie draft
- Debut: Round 9, 2020, Essendon vs. Brisbane Lions, at Carrara Stadium
- Height: 205 cm (6 ft 9 in)
- Weight: 105 kg (231 lb)
- Position: Ruck

Club information
- Current club: Brisbane Lions
- Number: 2

Playing career^{1}
Years	Club	Games (Goals)
2017–2025	Essendon	78 (43)
2026–	Brisbane Lions	26 (17)
Total		104 (60)
- ^{1} Playing statistics correct to the end of the 2026 season.

Career highlights
- AFL premiership player: 2026; AFL Goal of the Year: 2022

Sam Draper (born 28 September 1998) is an Australian rules footballer who plays for the Brisbane Lions in the Australian Football League (AFL). He was recruited by Essendon with the 1st draft pick in the 2017 AFL rookie draft.

== Early life ==
Draper was born in South Australia, but he lived in Brede in East Sussex for six years, where he enjoyed playing association football.

Draper attended Reynella East College and played for South Adelaide in the South Australian National Football League (SANFL) for the 2016 season.

== AFL career ==
=== Essendon (2017-2025) ===
Having initially played soccer throughout his youth, Draper switched codes to play Australian Rules Football in his final year of high school in 2016. Draper played for South Adelaide in the South Australian National Football League (SANFL). Having only started playing the sport in February, Draper was drafted by the Essendon Football Club only 9 months later in the rookie draft to join the club for the 2017 AFL season.

In 2019, while playing a match for Essendon's reserves team in the Victorian Football League (VFL), Draper tore his ACL. He missed nearly 12 months of football in his recovery, but signed a four-year contract extension in August of 2019.

Draper debuted in Round 9 of the 2020 AFL season in Essendon's 63-point loss against the Brisbane Lions. On debut, Draper picked up 9 disposals, 2 marks and 2 tackles, and kicked a behind. He quickly became a fan favourite through the remainder of the 2020 season due mostly to his extremely physical style of play and mullet hairstyle. He went on to play 8 games and win the club's Lindsay Griffiths Rising Star award at the conclusion of the season.

Draped switched his number 38 guernsey for number 2 prior to the 2021 season. He suffered a syndesmosis injury in Round 2 of 2021 after a good start to the beginning of the season. He was out of the team for 12 weeks before returning to the lineup in Round 14.

Playing every game of 2022, a highlight came when Draper kicked Goal of the Year against Gold Coast in Round 18. Eddie Betts called it Goal of the Year during Fox Footy's live commentary.

The following season, Draper was the target of controversy for an umpiring decision involving Adelaide forward Taylor Walker. Walker's tackle on Draper was not called holding the ball by the match officials in the dying seconds of the match. The AFL later conceded that the decision was an error. Draper scored the opening goal in 2024's ANZAC Day draw with Collingwood, but did not play again until June after he underwent a knee surgery.

Draper started the 2025 season in what he and the club described as "career best form", forming a strong ruck partnership with Nick Bryan and spending plenty of time up kicking goals up forward. Draper caused a stir by choosing to snap kick all his set shots, even when directly in front of goal; however, it proved highly successful, not missing any of his snaps across the first five rounds of the season. However, Draper suffered a ruptured achilles tendon in round 6, ending his season. At the conclusion of Essendon's season, Draper announced his intention to exercise his free agency rights and leave Essendon for a new club for the 2026 AFL season and beyond, with his club of choice later revealed to be Brisbane.

=== Brisbane (2026–present) ===
2026

Draper's move to the Lions was confirmed on the 4th of October 2025. Draper had a career best season in 2026, achieving career-high numbers in goals scored, and hitouts, as well as playing a career-high 26 games.

Draper played in 4 finals during his first year at Brisbane, after 9 seasons at Essendon having only played in a single finals match (49-point defeat to the Western Bulldogs).

Draper finished the 2026 AFL season with an average of 21 hitouts per game, and kicked 17 goals across 26 games. 1 of these goals was scored during the 2026 AFL Grand Final, in which Draper became a premiership player during what was his first season at the Brisbane Lions.

== In the media ==
Draper was the host of the 200 Plus podcast with former Network 10 sports journalist Nick Butler and North Melbourne Football Club player Charlie Comben. Following his move to the Brisbane Lions, Draper was replaced by Collingwood Football Club player Darcy Cameron but continued his involvement with the podcast as an occasional guest host.

== Statistics ==
Updated to the end of the 2026 season.

Legend
G	Goals	K	Kicks	D	Disposals	T	Tackles
B	Behinds	H	Handballs	M	Marks
#	Played in that season's premiership team

Season	Team	No.	Games	Totals								Averages (per game)								Votes
Season	Team	No.	Games	G	B	K	H	D	M	T	H/O	G	B	K	H	D	M	T	H/O	Votes
2017	Essendon	38	0	—	—	—	—	—	—	—	—	—	—	—	—	—	—	—	—	0
2018	Essendon	38	0	—	—	—	—	—	—	—	—	—	—	—	—	—	—	—	—	0
2019	Essendon	38	0	—	—	—	—	—	—	—	—	—	—	—	—	—	—	—	—	0
2020 (Note: The 2020 season was played with 17 home-and-away matches per team (down from 22) and 16-minute quarters with time on (down from 20-minute quarters with time on) due to the impact of the COVID-19 pandemic.)	Essendon	38	8	1	3	46	20	66	15	15	147	0.1	0.4	5.8	2.5	8.3	1.9	1.9	18.4	0
2021	Essendon	2	13	2	5	85	46	131	31	23	316	0.2	0.4	6.5	3.5	10.1	2.4	1.8	24.3	4
2022	Essendon	2	22	12	7	140	74	214	35	33	523	0.5	0.3	6.4	3.4	9.7	1.6	1.5	23.8	1
2023	Essendon	2	14	10	12	101	53	154	37	28	282	0.7	0.9	7.2	3.8	11.0	2.6	2.0	20.1	0
2024	Essendon	2	16	11	10	122	57	179	49	31	306	0.7	0.6	7.6	3.6	11.2	3.1	1.9	19.1	2
2025	Essendon	2	5	7	2	36	31	67	18	14	103	1.4	0.4	7.2	6.2	13.4	3.6	2.8	20.6	0
2026^{#}	Brisbane Lions	2	26	17	12	203	57	260	59	26	551	0.7	0.5	7.8	2.2	10.0	2.3	1	21.2	0
Career			104	60	51	733	338	1071	244	170	2229	0.6	0.5	7.0	3.2	10.3	2.3	1.6	21.4	7
