= 2026 AFL Grand Final =

Australian rules football match

- Interior view of the MCG during the post-match presentations

Fremantle	Brisbane Lions
12.17 (89)	14.12 (96)
	1	2	3	4
Fremantle	3.4 (22)	6.7 (43)	10.12 (72)	12.17 (89)
Brisbane	3.5 (23)	6.7 (43)	9.8 (62)	14.12 (96)
- Date: 26 September 2026, 2:30 pm
- Stadium: Melbourne Cricket Ground, Melbourne, Victoria, Australia
- Attendance: 100,023
- Favourite: Brisbane
- Umpires: Nick Foot, Brett Rosebury, Hayden Meyer, Brendan Hosking

Ceremonies
- Pre-match entertainment: Kylie Minogue, G Flip and Mike Brady
- National anthem: Michael Paynter

Accolades
- Norm Smith Medallist: Shai Bolton
- Jock McHale Medallist: Chris Fagan
- Ron Barassi Medallist: Harris Andrews, Josh Dunkley, Hugh McCluggage

The 2026 AFL Grand Final was an Australian rules football match contested between the Fremantle Football Club and the Brisbane Lions at the Melbourne Cricket Ground on Saturday, 26 September 2026. It was the 131st annual grand final of the Australian Football League, staged to determine the premiers of the 2026 AFL season. Brisbane won by a margin of seven points, after kicking four goals in the final five minutes of the match to overcome a 17-point deficit. It was Brisbane's sixth premiership overall, and third consecutive premiership.

== Background ==
The Fremantle Dockers entered the 2026 season following a one-point elimination final loss to the seventh-placed Gold Coast Suns in 2025. The Dockers claimed the 2026 minor premiership, the second in the club's history, with a 19–4 record. This run included a dominant 14-match winning streak following a first-round loss to Geelong. In their first qualifying final, Fremantle suffered an upset loss at Optus Stadium to Hawthorn, 5.10 (40) to 10.12 (72). The following week, they hosted Geelong in a semi-final; after giving up a 31-point first quarter lead to trail in the third quarter, the Dockers recovered to narrowly win 18.12 (120) to 16.10 (106). Fremantle then travelled to the Sydney Cricket Ground to face the Sydney Swans in a preliminary final. After the Swans led by a game-high 28 points late in the third quarter, Fremantle kicked six consecutive goals and restricted Sydney to just one behind in the final quarter, triumphing 12.11 (83) to 10.11 (71). It was Fremantle's second grand final appearance and their first since 2013.

Fremantle's entrance in the 2026 AFL Grand Final

The Brisbane Lions entered the 2026 season as back-to-back reigning premiers, having won both the 2024 and 2025 grand finals. Brisbane sat at 6–6 after round 12, then won 10 of their next 11 matches, finishing the regular season with a 16–7 record and placing third on the ladder. Their finals campaign commenced against the Sydney Swans at the SCG. Brisbane went in as heavy favourites, as Sydney was missing several key players due to internal suspensions stemming from an investigation into player misconduct. However, in a major upset, the Lions were soundly defeated 21.15 (141) to 13.10 (88). The following week, Brisbane comfortably defeated the Adelaide Crows 21.18 (144) to 13.13 (91) at the Gabba. They then faced Hawthorn in a preliminary final at the MCG, winning a thriller, 20.11 (131) to 19.8 (122), in what is widely considered one of the greatest preliminary finals ever played. Trailing in the third quarter, Brisbane kicked seven consecutive goals to take a 28-point lead early in the final term. Hawthorn responded with five unanswered goals to edge ahead by three points late in the game. In the final minute, a crucial free kick for holding the ball in the forward line against Jarman Impey allowed Hugh McCluggage to kick the go-ahead goal with just 18 seconds remaining. Brisbane secured the ensuing centre clearance and kicked another goal after the siren to extend the final margin to nine points. This victory secured Brisbane's fourth consecutive grand final appearance.

2026 AFL Grand Final day in Fremantle, Western Australia

Fremantle was seeking its maiden AFL premiership, having appeared in only one previous grand final, a 15-point loss to Hawthorn in 2013. Brisbane was contesting its fourth consecutive grand final, aiming for its sixth premiership overall and attempting to become the seventh VFL/AFL club in history to win three or more consecutive flags. The two sides had never previously met in a finals series.

The two clubs met once during the 2026 home-and-away season, with Fremantle recording a 25-point victory over the Lions at the Gabba in round 12. Brisbane opened as the clear favourite with bookmakers, holding odds of $1.65 compared to Fremantle's $2.30 on the Sunday prior to the game. Due to a guernsey clash, Brisbane wore its red Fitzroy-inspired guernsey in the match.

== Entertainment ==
The match commenced at 2:30 pm AEST as scheduled.

2026 AFL Grand Final schedule
Time (AEST)	Event
1:25 pm	G Flip performance
1:33 pm	Retiree motorcade and Mike Brady performance
1:39 pm	Pre-game entertainment – Kylie Minogue
2:11 pm	Umpires enter the field
2:13 pm	Brisbane Lions enter the field
2:16 pm	Fremantle enters the field
2:24 pm	Delivery of the 2026 Premiership Cup by Luke Hodge
2:25 pm	Welcome to Country performed by Uncle Colin Hunter Jnr
2:26 pm	National Anthem performed by Michael Paynter
2:28 pm	Coin toss
2:30 pm	2026 AFL Grand Final starts
Half-Time	Auskick; Grand Final Sprint, won by Jed Walter (Gold Coast)

=== Pre-match entertainment ===
A stage outside the Melbourne Cricket Ground before the start of the 2026 AFL Grand Final, where some of the performances were held

The pre-match entertainment was headlined by Australian singer Kylie Minogue. She was accompanied by regular grand final performer Mike Brady, William Barton on guitar during "Confide in Me" and multi-instrumentalist singer G Flip on "Padam Padam". The national anthem was performed by Michael Paynter.

The pre-show entertainment also had appearances from Dom Dolla, who remixed "Can't Get You Out of My Head", and the comedy duo The Inspired Unemployed, who served as conductors during Minogue's performance of "The Loco-Motion".

The under-17s AFL Futures match, usually played at the Melbourne Cricket Ground as an early curtain raiser, was relocated to the Mission Whitten Oval to protect the turf due to the rain.

== Match summary ==
The match was played in wet conditions, with light to moderate showers falling throughout the morning and first quarter of the match.

=== First quarter ===
Brisbane player Cam Rayner kicks towards goal during the match

Fremantle's Patrick Voss kicked the first behind of the match, before Brisbane went coast-to-coast from the kick-in, ending with Brisbane's Charlie Cameron kicking the first goal from a snap in the fourth minute. Fremantle's Josh Treacy scored from the ensuing centre bounce from a 50m set shot. The game remained close as each side missed shots over the next ten minutes, the next goal coming from Fremantle's Isaiah Dudley from a snap in the 19th minute. Brisbane kicked the next two goals, Oscar Allen kicking a goal in the 23rd minute from a forward-50 stoppage, and Kai Lohmann kicking a goal on the run three minutes later.

Fremantle answered in the 28th minute, Murphy Reid kicking a goal from a forward-50 stoppage. In the final minute, a short pass forward by Fremantle was caught by Treacy; most players stopped expecting a mark, but the umpire called play-on, judging the kick had been shorter than 15m, and called a ball-up. There was no further scoring, and at quarter time Brisbane led Fremantle by one point, 3.5 (23) to 3.4 (22).

=== Second quarter ===
Fremantle won the first centre clearance, ending with a contested mark and goal from 15 metres by Voss after only a minute. Conor McKenna kicked the next goal for Brisbane in the fourth minute, spectacularly chipping the ball through from almost on the behind post. Jye Amiss took a strong mark and kicked a set shot goal for Fremantle in the sixth minute. Levi Ashcroft kicked a goal on the run or Brisbane in the 9th minute. Voss kicked his second goal for Fremantle in the 15th minute. At this point, Fremantle had dominated territory for the quarter, with a 9–2 advantage in inside-50s, but had built a lead of only seven points.

Brisbane dominated territory over the subsequent ten minutes, recording seven consecutive inside-50s and managing a goal to Sam Draper in the 19th minute with a set shot from 50 metres, as well as two other behinds. There were no further goals in the quarter, with the defensive highlight coming late in the quarter when consecutive desperate lunges by Brisbane co-captain Josh Dunkley at the top of the 50-metre arc smothered two shots at goal by Fremantle players, with the second smother leaving him bloodied. At half time, scores were tied at 6.7 (43) apiece, with neither team having led by more than seven points at any point in the half.

By half time, Fremantle had established sustained strength in the midfield, now leading the clearances (21–15) after an overall even first quarter, and having led centre clearances (7–2) in the second quarter. Brisbane's Dayne Zorko had the most disposals of any player to half time with 15, followed by Fremantle's Murphy Reid (14) and Shai Bolton (13); Fremantle's Caleb Serong had eight clearances, the most of any player.

=== Third quarter ===
Fremantle took control of general play through the beginning of the third quarter, and over a dominant 12-minute period led inside-50s (7–2) and clearances (8–2). Fremantle managed only two goals during this period – by Jye Amiss in the 5th minute and Isaiah Dudley in the 13th minute – but also kicked three behinds and failed to score with several other gettable chances, extending the margin to 15 points. In the 8th minute, Fremantle captain Alex Pearce collapsed during a chase with a non-contact achilles tendon injury; he left the field and was immediately ruled out for the rest of the match.

Kai Lohmann kicked Brisbane's first goal in the 16th minute, sparking a run of three goals in eight minutes against the run of play for the Lions: to Lohmann, Allen (20th minute) and Cameron (23rd minute), which gave Brisbane a one-point lead. The lead was short-lived as Hayden Young kicked a goal after Fremantle won the ensuing centre clearance to restore a five-point lead. Young kicked another goal in the 31st minute from a round-the-corner set shot on the boundary line to give Fremantle a 10.12 (72) to 9.8 (62) advantage at three-quarter time.

Fremantle dominated most aspects of the third quarter, recording 21 inside-50s and winning every centre clearance; but errant goalkicking meant they had scored only 4.5 (29), with several other misses, compared with Brisbane's 3.1 (19). Serong continued his dominance in clearances, having now had 12 for the match.

=== Final quarter ===
The fourth quarter continued as a tight affair. Brisbane had the better of the first fifteen minutes, controlling 70% of territory, but only managed one goal during that time, Logan Morris's first for the match which came after Dunkley won a holding the ball free kick. Both teams missed chances, Brisbane kicking four behinds during that time and Fremantle kicking three, with the margin reduced to two points.

Over the following seven minutes, Fremantle had the better of play. Michael Frederick intercepted an errant attemped rebound by Harris Andrews and kicked a goal from a 30-metre set shot to extend the lead to nine points in the 17th minute. Three minutes later, Josh Treacy gathered the ball over the back of a pack in the goal square; he went to torpedo the ball into the upper grandstands, but he was barely nudged off his kick by a desperate defensive effort from Brisbane's Ryan Lester, causing him to miss the goal from only a couple of metres out. Matthew Johnson kicked a further behind one minute later; but Bolton intercepted Brisbane's kick-in and passed to Voss at the top of the goal square, who kicked his third goal in the 22nd minute. With 4:18 of game time remaining, Fremantle now led by a game-high 17 points. Fremantle's off-field team chose this moment to activate their crowd support routine "Wharfie Time" after the goal, a once-per-match call for noise accompanied by AC/DC's "Hells Bells", generating excitement from the Fremantle fans.

The celebrations were then quickly silenced, as Brisbane kicked two goals in the next 45 seconds of playing time to bring the margin back to five points: Cameron kicked the first with a 25-metre snap after collecting on the lead; and Zac Bailey kicked the second from a 40-metre snap out of congestion, although some observers considered that a high fend-off by Bailey on Caleb Serong was missed by the umpire. With two minutes remaining, a quick Brisbane rebound chain from defensive 50 ended with a contested overhead mark by Logan Morris, and he kicked a goal from 35 metres directly in front to put Brisbane one point ahead with 1:04 remaining. Fremantle had one more foray forward inside the final minute, but Brisbane cleared to a stoppage on the wing. Brisbane cleared from the final stoppage, after the ruck tap bounced at a sharp angle away from Caleb Serong and towards Will Ashcroft, who cleared ball into Brisbane's forward 50 resulting in Morris snapping his third goal of the quarter in the final seconds to extend the margin to seven points. The final score was Brisbane 14.12 (96) def. Fremantle 12.17 (89).

Will Ashcroft was dominant during the final four minutes, with six disposals and four clearances, including three centre clearances; he had twelve disposals across the entire final quarter. Logan Morris kicked three final quarter goals.

=== Overall ===
Over the match, Brisbane led most basic statistical indicators, including disposals (358–308), kicks (245–203), handballs (113–105) and marks (84–77) – although Fremantle was able to keep Brisbane, a team known for its short kick-and-mark gameplan, well below its season average of 108 marks. Fremantle, on the other hand, dominated most of the contested statistics, including free kicks (12–7), contested marks (17–7), inside-50s (62–48), hitouts (51–33), clearances (45–31) and centre clearances (17–9) – for centre clearances in particular, Fremantle won every centre clearance in the second and third quarters, and Brisbane had won only five for the entire match before it won four in a row during the comeback in the final four minutes. Inaccurate goalkicking by Fremantle across the match proved decisive, as the expected result based on the league average for the quality of shots taken at goal would have seen Fremantle win by a score of 97–86. Brisbane coach Chris Fagan, in his post-match speech while receiving the Jock McHale Medal, admitted that Fremantle had probably deserved to win the match.

Fremantle's very late game collapse was considered one of the most heartbreaking losses in grand final history; and at the time, Fremantle's 17-point advantage after 23 minutes was the highest lead in time-on of a final quarter that any team had held before losing in a finals match in the 21st century.

The decision to enact Wharfie Time in the moment that Fremantle chose was, with benefit of hindsight, criticised as a case of premature celebration. Following the match, Brisbane players commented that they had mentally prepared for Wharfie Time during the week in team meetings, planning to use the music as their own motivation; co-captain Josh Dunkley in particular could be seen waving his arms to encourage the Brisbane players as "Hells Bells" played.

The match is the highest-rating AFL game of all time in total television viewership, averaging 4.52 million people who watched the match on TV nationally and peaking at 6.5 million viewers.

=== Norm Smith Medal ===
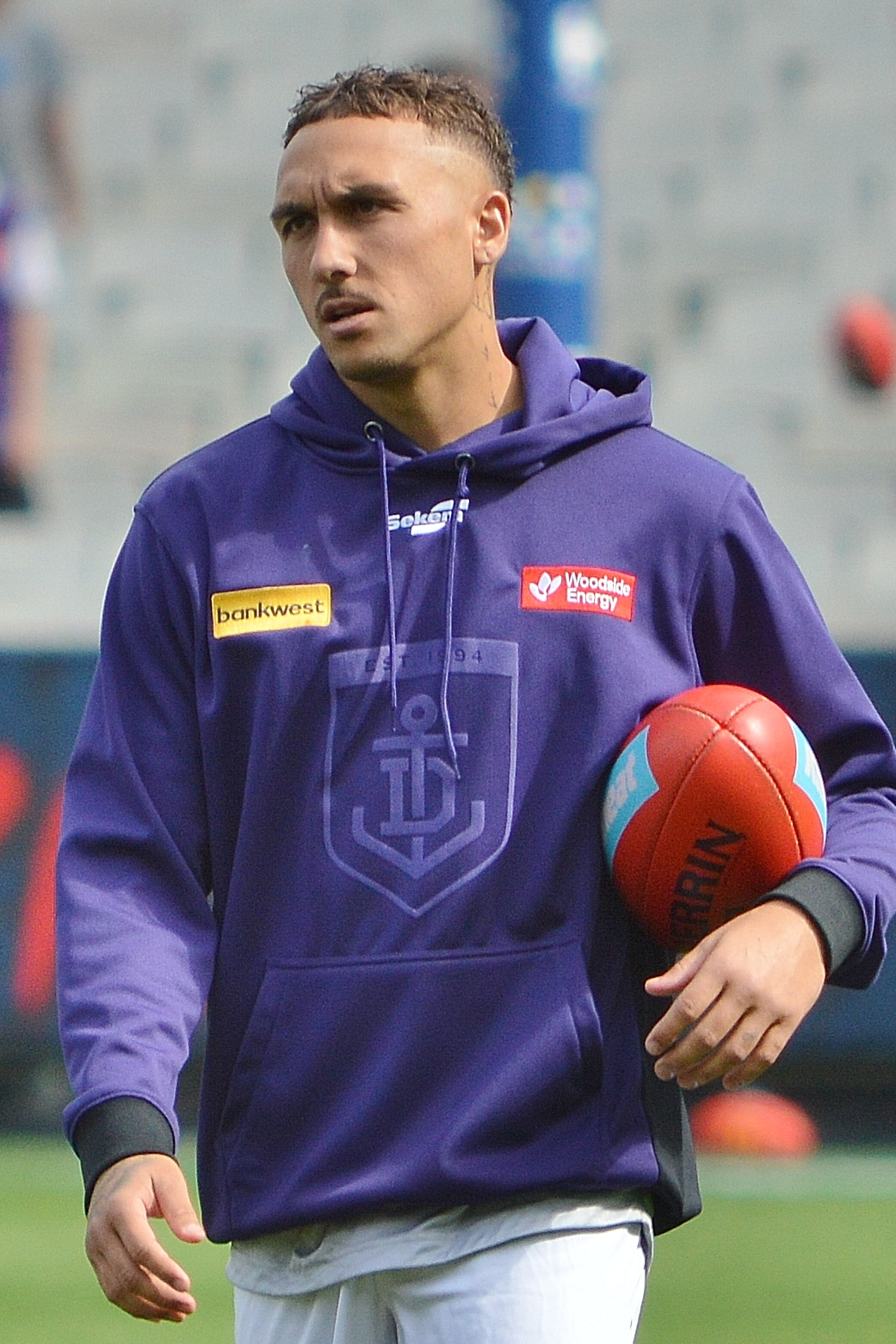
Shai Bolton won the Norm Smith Medal.

The Norm Smith Medal was won by Fremantle midfielder Shai Bolton, polling 10 of a possible 15 votes. The panel judged Bolton best on ground for a consistent performance across four quarters which included 26 disposals, a game-high 686 metres gained and 9 score involvements. He was the fifth player to win the medal in a losing team, and the first since Chris Judd in 2005.

Brisbane rebounding defender Dayne Zorko (28 disposals, 660 metres gained) was second with six votes, despite needing attention for a corked thigh in the first quarter. Brisbane midfielder Will Ashcroft (31 disposals and 9 clearances for the match; 12 disposals and 4 clearances in the final quarter) was third, also with six votes but behind Zorko on countback; Fremantle midfielders Caleb Serong (24 disposals, 13 clearances) and Hayden Young (22 disposals, 2 goals) polled four and three votes respectively, and Brisbane small forward Charlie Cameron (3 goals) polled one.

2026 Norm Smith Medal voting
Panellist	3 votes	2 votes	1 vote
Andrew McLeod (chair)	Dayne Zorko (Brisbane)	Hayden Young (Fremantle)	Shai Bolton (Fremantle)
Shaun Burgoyne	Dayne Zorko (Brisbane)	Shai Bolton (Fremantle)	Hayden Young (Fremantle)
Chris Judd	Shai Bolton (Fremantle)	Will Ashcroft (Brisbane)	Charlie Cameron (Brisbane)
Michael Voss	Shai Bolton (Fremantle)	Caleb Serong (Fremantle)	Will Ashcroft (Brisbane)
Lauren Wood	Will Ashcroft (Brisbane)	Caleb Serong (Fremantle)	Shai Bolton (Fremantle)

Leaderboard
Player	Team	Votes	Total
Shai Bolton	Fremantle	3, 3, 2, 1, 1	10
Dayne Zorko	Brisbane	3, 3	6
Will Ashcroft	Brisbane	3, 2, 1	6
Caleb Serong	Fremantle	2, 2	4
Hayden Young	Fremantle	2, 1	3
Charlie Cameron	Brisbane	1	1

Other Brisbane players considered among the best were defensive midfielder Josh Dunkley (21 disposals, 12 tackles and several crucial smothers), forward Kai Lohmann (2 goals, 2 assists, 10 tackles), wingman Jarrod Berry (17 disposals, 6 intercept marks) and midfielder Cam Rayner (18 disposals, 8 score involvements). Other Fremantle players among the best were ruckman Luke Jackson (47 hitouts including 13 to advantage, 4 clearances), defender Heath Chapman (5 intercept marks), small forward Isaiah Dudley (2 goals) and key forward Patrick Voss (3 goals and an effective defensive forward's role at limiting Harris Andrews' influence).

=== Award presenters ===
Four-time Hawthorn premiership player Luke Hodge is the premiership cup ambassador and carried the cup onto the ground before the match. Three-time Geelong premiership player Paul Chapman presented the Norm Smith Medal to the player adjudged best on ground; Chapman himself won the medal in 2009. Former Sydney coach Paul Roos, who coached the Swans to the 2005 premiership, presented the Jock McHale Medal to the successful coach, while Richmond's 1969 premiership captain Roger Dean presented the Ron Barassi Medal to the winning captain.

Retired Lions great Simon Black, who played a key role in the club's hat-trick of premierships in the early 2000s, presented the premiership cup to his former side. Had Fremantle won the match, Shaun McManus, a member of the inaugural 1995 Fremantle, would have presented the cup.

== Teams ==
The teams were announced on the Thursday before the match. Neither club made any changes to the line-ups that featured in their respective preliminary finals.

In the days leading up to the game, Brisbane faced a potential forced change. Former co-captain Lachie Neale was initially suspended for one match for striking Hawthorn's Jack Ginnivan in the stomach off the ball during the first quarter of their preliminary final. Neale was suspended by the match review officer, and the ban was upheld by the AFL Tribunal on Tuesday. Brisbane subsequently appealed to the league's Appeal Board, which overturned the decision on Thursday. The Board ruled that the tribunal had failed to give sufficient weight to Neale's exemplary record of 320 games without a suspension. Determining that this satisfied the clause relating to exceptional and compelling circumstances in the league's regulations, the Board downgraded Neale's suspension to a $10,000 fine, clearing him to play. Neale, who had begun his career with Fremantle, was roundly booed by the Fremantle crowd throughout the match.

Fremantle Dockers	Brisbane Lions

Fremantle Dockers
B:	6 Jordan Clark	25 Alex Pearce	17 Judd McVee
HB:	23 Karl Worner	21 Oscar McDonald	5 Heath Chapman
C:	44 Matthew Johnson	8 Andrew Brayshaw	28 Neil Erasmus
HF:	32 Michael Frederick	16 Murphy Reid	39 Sam Switkowski
F:	24 Jye Amiss	35 Josh Treacy	20 Patrick Voss
Foll:	9 Luke Jackson	3 Caleb Serong	10 Shai Bolton
Int:	43 Isaiah Dudley	26 Hayden Young	18 Mason Cox
Int:	34 Corey Wagner	13 Luke Ryan	
Coach:	Justin Longmuir		
Emg:	36 Brennan Cox	45 Chris Scerri	2 Jaeger O'Meara

Brisbane Lions
B:	35 Ryan Lester	31 Harris Andrews	22 Ty Gallop
HB:	15 Dayne Zorko	27 Darcy Gardiner	3 Jaspa Fletcher
C:	33 Zac Bailey	8 Will Ashcroft	7 Jarrod Berry
HF:	26 Conor McKenna	13 Logan Morris	23 Charlie Cameron
F:	1 Kai Lohmann	16 Cam Rayner	30 Eric Hipwood
Foll:	2 Sam Draper	5 Josh Dunkley	6 Hugh McCluggage
Int:	4 Oscar Allen	9 Lachie Neale	10 Levi Ashcroft
Int:	32 Darcy Fort	44 Darcy Wilmot	
Coach:	Chris Fagan		
Emg:	37 Cody Curtin	38 Bruce Reville	43 Noah Answerth

=== Umpires ===
The umpiring panel is composed of four field umpires, four boundary umpires, two goal umpires, and one emergency in each position.

2026 AFL Grand Final umpiring panel
Position					Emergency
Field	8 Brett Rosebury (10)	14 Hayden Meyer (3)	16 Brendan Hosking (2)	2 Nick Foot (2)	22 Nathan Williamson
Boundary	Matt Tomkins (7)	Michael Barlow (5)	Jordan Russell (1)	Benjamin Fely (1)	Michael Marantelli
Goal	Dylan Benwell (1)	Matthew Dervan (5)			Steven Piperno

Numbers in brackets represent the number of grand finals umpired, including 2026.

== Scorecard ==
Grand final
Saturday, 26 September (2:30 pm)	Fremantle	def. by	Brisbane Lions	Melbourne Cricket Ground (crowd: 100,023)	Report
3.4 (22); 6.7 (43); 10.12 (72); 12.17 (89)	Q1; Q2; Q3; Final	3.5 (23); 6.7 (43); 9.8 (62); 14.12 (96)	Umpires: Foot, Rosebury, Meyer, Hosking; Norm Smith Medal: Shai Bolton; Television broadcast: Seven Network; National anthem: Michael Paynter
Voss 3, Young 2, Dudley 2, Amiss 2, Treacy, Reid, Frederick	Goals	Morris 3, Cameron 3, Lohmann 2, Allen 2, McKenna, Draper, Bailey, L. Ashcroft
Serong, Young, Voss, Reid, Jackson, Bolton	Best	Dunkley, W. Ashcroft, Zorko, Cameron, Wilmot, Gallop, Lohmann
Pearce (Achilles)	Injuries
