= Conor McKenna =

Irish sportsman

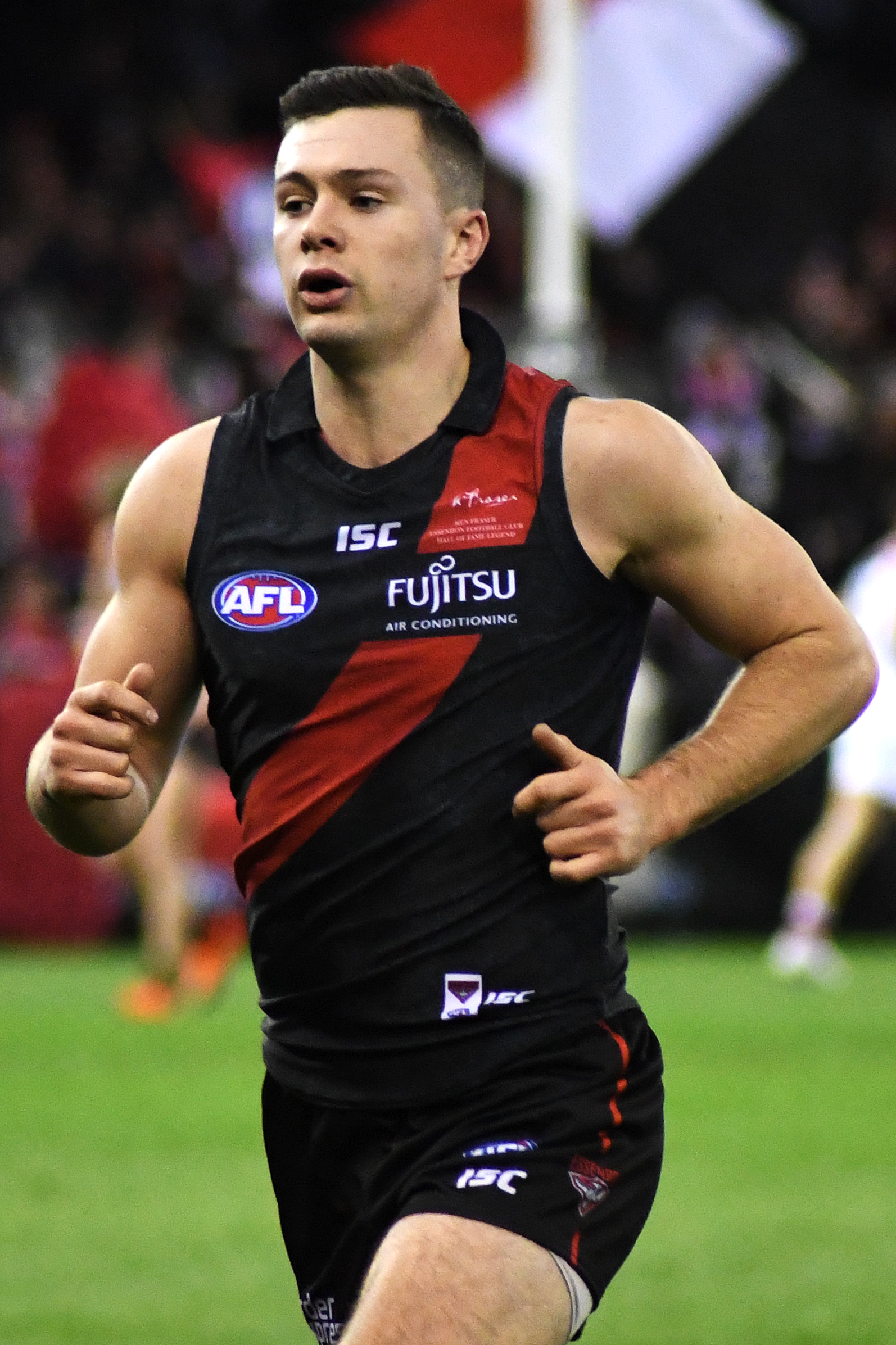
- McKenna playing for Essendon in August 2018

Personal information
- Full name: Conor McKenna
- Born: 28 March 1996 (age 30); County Tyrone, Northern Ireland
- Original team: Eglish (club)/Tyrone (underage, county team)
- Draft: No. 62, 2014 rookie draft
- Height: 184 cm (6 ft 0 in)
- Weight: 88 kg (194 lb)
- Position: Half-back flank/Forward

Club information
- Current club: Brisbane Lions
- Number: 26

Playing career^{1}
Years	Club	Games (Goals)
2015–2020	Essendon	79 (20)
2023–	Brisbane Lions	70 (34)
Total		149 (54)
- ^{1} Playing statistics correct to the end of the 2026 season.

Career highlights
- 2× AFL premiership player: 2024, 2026; AFL Goal of the Year: 2026; 22under22 team: 2018; Signature

Conor McKenna (born 28 March 1996) is an Irish Gaelic football and Australian rules football player. He currently plays professional Australian rules football for Brisbane Lions in the Australian Football League (AFL). McKenna previously played for Essendon in the AFL and Gaelic football for Eglish St Patrick's and Tyrone. He won the All-Ireland Senior Football Championship for Tyrone in 2021 and the AFL Premiership playing for Brisbane in 2024, becoming only the second male player win both codes national titles after Tadhg Kennelly.

== Career ==
=== Tyrone (Gaelic) ===
McKenna was born in County Tyrone, Northern Ireland, and grew up in the village of Benburb near Dungannon. There he played Gaelic football for Eglish St Patrick's and the Tyrone county team (minor level). He played a starring role in Tyrone's run to the 2012 All-Ireland Minor Football Championship Final.

=== Essendon (AFL) ===
In December 2013, 18-year-old McKenna attracted interest from several AFL clubs when he was spotted at a talent combine in Ireland. Ten months later, on 3 October 2014, Essendon secured McKenna to a two-year deal as a Category B rookie. McKenna made his AFL debut against Richmond at the Melbourne Cricket Ground in round 22, 2015, and kicked a goal with his first kick. McKenna re-signed with Essendon at the end of 2017 with a new four-year contract.

On 20 June 2020, McKenna tested positive for COVID-19. This resulted in the postponement of the match scheduled for the following day between Essendon and Melbourne. One other player was quarantined due to close contact during training. McKenna had another COVID-19 test on 22 June which was confirmed as negative in the evening of 23 June. He remained in quarantine pending a further test later in the week. During this time McKenna was subjected to an intense trial by media, abuse on social media and became a public villain in the country, treatment which provoked much criticism. Geelong footballer Zach Tuohy described the official and media abuse directed at McKenna as "disgraceful" and "outrageous". In Ireland, it was also suggested "stars of the future that may being [sic] tempted to pursue a life in the AFL Down Under, may reconsider".

On 8 September 2020, McKenna announced his retirement and return to Ireland after 79 games played. Though he had a contract until 2021, McKenna parted on good terms with the club, its representatives and supporters, stating: "I will always be grateful for Essendon's support of both myself and my family since I arrived at the club from the other side of the world at the end of 2014. I will miss my teammates and coaches and I want to thank the Bomber fans for their support across the journey too. I will always wish the boys well and hope they see success in the not too distant future". McKenna told the local ABC outlet that "the way the media works in Melbourne there doesn't seem to be [repercussions]. There's just a free-for-all to say whatever you want. If there are no repercussions, they'll just continue to do that and treat players like a piece of meat". After returning home and resuming his Gaelic football career, he told the Irish Examiner: "I think [the media] it's a very negative thing over there… No matter if it's true, they want to be the first person to say it, no matter what it is", but described an apology as not "something that I was looking for... it didn't make much difference at that stage".

=== Return to Tyrone (Gaelic) ===
The following month, McKenna made his first start for Tyrone against Donegal as the 2020 National Football League resumed after a long suspension caused by the impact of the COVID-19 pandemic on Gaelic games. Donegal defender Stephen McMenamin fouled McKenna to concede a penalty in that game but Donegal won by four. In his second game McKenna scored two goals that helped relegate Mayo, in what was that county's first time to be knocked out of the top flight in 23 years.

McKenna scored two goals in the 2021 All-Ireland Senior Football Championship semi-final defeat of Kerry. When Tyrone then defeated Mayo in the 2021 All-Ireland Senior Football Championship Final, McKenna became the fourth former AFL player to win the Sam Maguire Cup (and the first since Tadhg Kennelly in 2009).

=== Brisbane Lions (AFL) ===
McKenna confirmed his intention to resume his AFL career in 2023, signing with the Brisbane Lions ahead of the 2023 AFL season. McKenna made his Brisbane debut against Port Adelaide in Round 1, kicking one goal and racking up 20 disposals in a 54-point defeat. He went on to play in the 2023 AFL Grand Final loss to Collingwood.

McKenna was part of the Brisbane Lions 2024 premiership winning team, starting the match as the substitute in a 60 point victory over the Sydney Swans.

In 2026, McKenna won the Goal of the Year after scoring a spectacular goal against Collingwood in Round 24. He was part of the Brisbane Lions 2026 premiership winning team.

== Statistics ==
Updated to the end of the 2026 season.

Legend
G	Goals	K	Kicks	D	Disposals	T	Tackles
B	Behinds	H	Handballs	M	Marks
#	Played in that season's premiership team

Season	Team	No.	Games	Totals							Averages (per game)							Votes
Season	Team	No.	Games	G	B	K	H	D	M	T	G	B	K	H	D	M	T	Votes
2015	Essendon	45	2	2	3	13	9	22	7	3	1.0	1.5	6.5	4.5	11.0	3.5	1.5	0
2016	Essendon	45	12	3	3	102	65	167	41	21	0.3	0.3	8.5	5.4	13.9	3.4	1.8	0
2017	Essendon	45	19	5	1	207	115	322	69	29	0.3	0.1	10.9	6.1	16.9	3.6	1.5	1
2018	Essendon	45	18	7	4	213	109	322	57	30	0.4	0.2	11.8	6.1	17.9	3.2	1.7	0
2019	Essendon	45	22	2	1	315	145	460	58	34	0.1	0.0	14.3	6.6	20.9	2.6	1.5	0
2020 (Note: The 2020 season was played with 17 home-and-away matches per team (down from 22) and 16-minute quarters with time on (down from 20-minute quarters with time on) due to the impact of the COVID-19 pandemic.)	Essendon	45	6	1	0	55	25	80	18	10	0.2	0.0	9.2	4.2	13.3	3.0	1.7	0
2023	Brisbane Lions	26	26	7	5	358	81	439	95	38	0.3	0.2	13.8	3.1	16.9	3.7	1.5	0
2024^{#}	Brisbane Lions	26	18	0	2	202	32	234	77	10	0.0	0.1	11.2	1.8	13.0	4.3	0.6	0
2025	Brisbane Lions	26	5	2	1	19	6	25	7	7	0.4	0.2	3.8	1.2	5.0	1.4	1.4	0
2026^{#}	Brisbane Lions	26	21	25	19	204	52	256	45	31	1.2	0.9	9.7	2.5	12.2	2.1	1.5	0
Career			149	54	39	1689	637	2326	474	213	0.4	0.3	11.3	4.3	15.6	3.2	1.4	1

== Honours and achievements ==
Team

- AFL premiership player: 2024, 2026

Individual

- 22under22 team: 2018
