= Hayden Meyer =

Australian rules football umpire

Personal information
- Full name: Hayden Meyer
- Height: 184 cm (6 ft 0 in)
- Weight: 71 kg (157 lb)
- Other occupation: Chef

Umpiring career
Years	League	Role
2017–	AFL	Field umpire

Career highlights
- 2023 AFL Grand Final; 2025 AFL Grand Final; 2026 AFL Grand Final

Hayden Meyer (né Gavine) is an Australian rules football umpire currently officiating in the Australian Football League.

He umpired in the Victorian Football League before joining the AFL list. He officiated in over 60 VFL matches, including the 2015 and 2016 grand finals. He was appointed to the senior AFL umpiring list for the 2017 season, and officiated in 10 matches in his debut season.

Meyer has officiated in three AFL Grand Finals: 2023, 2025 and 2026.
