= Brendan Hosking =

Australian rules football umpire

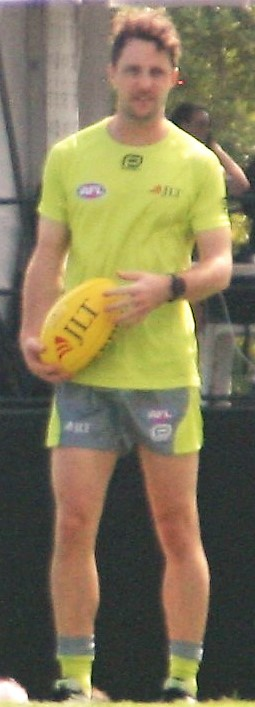
- Hosking in March 2018

Personal information
- Full name: Brendan Hosking
- Nickname: Hosko/Bdog
- Height: 181 cm (5 ft 11 in)
- Weight: 70 kg (154 lb)
- Other occupation: Sports administrator

Umpiring career
| Years | League | Role | Games |
| 2012– | AFL | Field umpire | 309 |

Career highlights
- 2022 AFL Grand Final; 2026 AFL Grand Final

Brendan Hosking is an Australian rules football umpire currently officiating in the Australian Football League.

He first umpired in the Essendon District Football League in 2003. He went on to umpire in the 2010 TAC Cup Grand Final and the 2011 VFL Grand Final. He made his AFL umpiring debut in Round 3, 2012, in a match between Greater Western Sydney and West Coast.

He was appointed to the 2022 AFL Grand Final and the 2026 AFL Grand Final.

Hosking teaches Health and Physical Education at Yarra Valley Grammar School and formerly taught at Richmond High School.
