= 2026 Fremantle Football Club season =

Australian rules football season

Fremantle Dockers
2026 season
- Fremantle entering the arena before the 2026 AFL Grand Final at the MCG
- President: Chris Sutherland
- Coach: Justin Longmuir
- Captain: Alex Pearce
- Home ground: Optus Stadium (capacity: 61,266)
- Pre-season: 1 win, 0 losses
- AFL season: 1st: (2nd minor premiership) 19-4
- Finals Series: Runner-Up

The 2026 Fremantle Football Club season is the club's 32nd season of senior competition in the Australian Football League (AFL).

The 2026 AFL season was the club's most successful season, winning a record-breaking 19 games in the home and away season, winning the minor premiership and playing in the AFL Grand Final for only the second time in the club's history. Whilst they were leading the 2026 AFL Grand Final with just over four minutes to play, the Brisbane Lions finished strongly to with their third consecutive premiership.

== Squad Changes ==
See also Fremantle Football Club drafting and trading history for the complete list of Fremantle's draft selections, delistings and trades

=== In ===
| No. | Name | Position | Previous club | via |
|---|---|---|---|---|
| 17 | (Western Australia) Judd McVee | Defender | Melbourne | trade |
| 15 | (Victoria (state)) Adam Sweid | Midfielder/Forward | Calder Cannons | draft |
| 11 | (Victoria (state)) Tobyn Murray | Forward | Geelong VFL | draft |
| 19 | (Western Australia) Leon Kickett | Forward | Swan Districts | draft |
| 27 | (Western Australia) Toby Whan | Midfielder | South Fremantle | draft |
| 40 | (Western Australia) Ryda Luke | Forward | South Fremantle | draft |
| 18 | (United States) Mason Cox | Ruckman | Collingwood | SSP signing |
| 45 | (Victoria (state)) Chris Scerri | Forward | Northern Bullants | SSP signing |

=== Out ===
| No. | Name | Position | New Club | via |
|---|---|---|---|---|
| 7 | (Western Australia) Nat Fyfe | Midfielder | – | retired |
| 10 | (Western Australia) Michael Walters | Forward | – | retired |
| 11 | (South Australia) James Aish | Midfielder/Defender | – | retired |
| 17 | (Victoria (state)) Will Brodie | Midfielder | Port Adelaide | trade |
| 18 | (Victoria (state)) Liam Reidy | Ruck | Carlton | trade |
| 19 | (Western Australia) Quinton Narkle | Forward | – | retired |
| 27 | (Western Australia) Odin Jones | Forward/Ruck | West Perth | delisted |
| 40 | (South Australia) Jack Delean | Forward | South Adelaide | delisted |

== Squad ==
Fremantle Football Club · AFL personnel
| Senior list | | Rookie list | Coaching staff |
|---|---|---|---|
| 1 Sam Sturt; 2 Jaeger O'Meara; 3 Caleb Serong (vc); 4 Sean Darcy; 5 Heath Chapman; 6 Jordan Clark; 8 Andrew Brayshaw (vc); 9 Luke Jackson; 10 Shai Bolton; 11 Tobyn Murray; 12 Hugh Davies; 13 Luke Ryan; 14 Jeremy Sharp; 15 Adam Sweid; 16 Murphy Reid; 17 Judd McVee; 21 Oscar McDonald; 22 Charlie Nicholls; 23 Karl Worner; 24 Jye Amiss; 25 Alex Pearce (c) | 26 Hayden Young; 28 Neil Erasmus; 29 Cooper Simpson; 30 Nathan O'Driscoll; 31 Brandon Walker; 32 Michael Frederick; 33 Ollie Murphy; 34 Corey Wagner; 35 Josh Treacy; 36 Brennan Cox; 37 Josh Draper; 38 Jaren Carr; 39 Sam Switkowski; 41 Bailey Banfield; 44 Matthew Johnson | 18 Mason Cox; 19 Leon Kickett; 20 Patrick Voss; 27 Toby Whan (B); 40 Ryda Luke (B); 42 Aiden Riddle; 43 Isaiah Dudley; 45 Chris Scerri | Head coach: Justin Longmuir; Assistant coaches: Jade Rawlings (back line); Joel Corey (midfield); Harry Garland (stoppages); Jaymie Graham (forward line); Sam Naismith (ruck); Tendai Mzungu (development); Todd Curley (development); Chris Mayne (development); Legend: (c) Captain(s); (vc) Vice-captain(s); (B) Category B rookie(s); italics – Inactive; (ret) Retired; Long-term injury; Updated: 21 November 2026; Source(s): Players, coaches, injuries |

== Season ==
Fremantle warming up in Round 23 against the Adelaide Crows at Optus Stadium

After a narrow loss away to Geelong in the first round, the Dockers won their next 14 consecutive matches, the longest winning streak ever by a major West Australian sporting club.

Fremantle ultimately finished the season first on the ladder, securing the minor premiership with a round to spare. They finished with a club record 19 win and 4 loss season, and were unbeaten at home.

After losing their Qualifying Final to Hawthorn, Fremantle won their next two finals to reach the AFL Grand Final for only the club's second time.

In the Grand Final, the scores were level at half time after a tight first half. Fremantle moved out to a 10-point lead at three-quarter time, and extended their advantage to 17 points with just over four minutes to play. After the stadium played the Wharfie Time crowd activation sound on the big screen, Brisbane responded by kicking the next four goals to win by seven points and claimed their third consecutive premiership.

=== Pre Season ===
Fremantle's 2026 Pre Season fixtures
| Game | Date and local time | Opponent | Scores^{[a]} | | | Venue | Attendance | Ref |
| Game | Date and local time | Opponent | Home | Away | Result | Venue | Attendance | Ref |
|---|---|---|---|---|---|---|---|---|
| Community Series | Saturday, 28 February (3:10 pm) | Adelaide | **12.12 (84)** | 9.14 (68) | Won by 16 points | Lane Group Stadium | 6,149 | |

=== Home & Away Season ===
Fremantle's 2026 AFL season fixture
| Round | Date and local time | Opponent | Scores (bold indicates Fremantle score) | | | Venue | Attendance | Ladder position | Ref |
| Round | Date and local time | Opponent | Home | Away | Result | Venue | Attendance | Ladder position | Ref |
|---|---|---|---|---|---|---|---|---|---|
| OR | Bye | | | | | | | 13th | Bye |
| 1 | Saturday, 14 March (4:15 pm) | Geelong | 16.14 (110) | **14.16 (100)** | Lost by 10 points | GMHBA Stadium [A] | 27,815 | 13th | |
| 2 | Saturday, 22 March (4:35 pm) | Melbourne | **17.16 (118)** | 10.10 (70) | Won by 48 points | Optus Stadium [H] | 44,736 | 5th ▲ | |
| 3 | Saturday, 28 March (1:15 pm) | Richmond | **13.25 (103)** | 6.7 (43) | Won by 60 points | Optus Stadium [H] | 35,245 | 3rd ▲ | |
| 4 | Friday, 3 April (6:45 pm) | Adelaide | 11.10 (76) | **11.12 (78)** | Won by 2 points | Adelaide Oval [A] | 48,627 | 4th ▼ | |
| 5 | Friday, 10 April (7:40 pm) | Collingwood | 5.9 (39) | **7.3 (45)** | Won by 6 points | Adelaide Oval [A] | 47,275 | 2nd ▲ | |
| 6 | Sunday, 19 April (3:10 pm) | West Coast | 5.11 (41) | **14.13 (97)** | Won by 56 points | Optus Stadium [A] | 54,232 | 2nd | |
| 7 | Saturday, 25 April (6:15 pm) | Carlton | **16.7 (103)** | 13.11 (89) | Won by 14 points | Optus Stadium [H] | 54,100 | 2nd | |
| 8 | Friday, 1 May (7:30 pm) | Western Bulldogs | 15.12 (102) | **17.12 (114)** | Won by 12 points | Marvel Stadium [A] | 23,071 | 2nd | |
| 9 | Thursday, 7 May (6:10 pm) | Hawthorn | **12.16 (88)** | 11.7 (73) | Won by 15 points | Optus Stadium [H] | 54,140 | 2nd | |
| 10 | Sunday, 17 May (1:10 pm) | Essendon | 8.13 (61) | **16.8 (104)** | Won by 43 points | MCG [A] | 25,100 | 2nd | |
| 11 | Friday, 22 May (6:30 pm) | St Kilda | **16.8 (104)** | 11.8 (74) | Won by 30 points | Optus Stadium [H] | 53,707 | 1st ▲ | |
| 12 | Saturday, 30 May (4:15 pm) | Brisbane Lions | 10.18 (78) | **15.13 (103)** | Won by 25 points | The Gabba [A] | 32,423 | 1st | |
| 13 | Saturday, 6 June (12:15 pm) | North Melbourne | 4.7 (31) | **24.11 (155)** | Won by 124 points | Hands Oval [A] | 13,332 | 1st | |
| 14 | Bye | | | | | | | 1st | Bye |
| 15 | Thursday, 18 June (6:10 pm) | Geelong | **14.15 (99)** | 14.6 (90) | Won by 9 points | Optus Stadium [H] | 55,201 | 1st | |
| 16 | Sunday, 28 June (3:10 pm) | Gold Coast | **11.14 (81)** | 3.11 (29) | Won by 51 points | Optus Stadium [H] | 50,602 | 1st | |
| 17 | Saturday, 4 July (11:35 am) | Greater Western Sydney | 16.13 (109) | **13.10 (88)** | Lost by 21 points | Manuka Oval [A] | 11,856 | 1st | |
| 18 | Thursday, 9 July (6:10 pm) | Sydney | **15.21 (111)** | 10.13 (73) | Won by 38 points | Optus Stadium [H] | 55,966 | 1st | |
| 19 | Saturday, 18 July | Port Adelaide | 11.9 (75) | **15.13 (103)** | Won by 28 points | Adelaide Oval [A] | 28,727 | 1st | |
| 20 | Friday, 24 July | West Coast | **16.16 (122)** | 6.6 (42) | Won by 80 points | Optus Stadium [H] | 56,616 | 1st | |
| 21 | Friday, 31 July | Western Bulldogs | **11.12 (78)** | 5.11 (41) | Won by 37 points | Optus Stadium [H] | 53,524 | 1st | |
| 22 | Saturday, 8 August | Melbourne | 17.11 (113) | **17.7 (109)** | Lost by 4 points | MCG [A] | 40,938 | 1st | |
| 23 | Friday, 14 August | Adelaide | **16.16 (112)** | 13.10 (88) | Won by 24 points | Optus Stadium [H] | 55,010 | 1st | |
| 24 | Saturday, 22 August | Carlton | 18.11 (119) | **12.10 (82)** | Lost by 37 points | Marvel Stadium [A] | 42,020 | 1st | |

=== Finals ===
Fremantle's Finals fixture
| Round | Date and local time | Opponent | Scores^{[a]} | | | Venue | Attendance | Ref |
| Round | Date and local time | Opponent | Home | Away | Result | Venue | Attendance | Ref |
|---|---|---|---|---|---|---|---|---|
| 1st Qualifying Final | Thursday, 3 September (6:10 pm) | Hawthorn | **5.10 (40)'** | 10.12 (72) | Lost by 32 points | Optus Stadium [H] | 59,466 | |
| First Semi-Final | Friday, 11 September (6:10 pm) | Geelong | **18.12 (120)** | 16.10 (106) | Won by 14 points | Optus Stadium [H] | 59,725 | |
| Second Preliminary Final | Friday, 18 September (7:40 pm) | Sydney | 10.11 (71) | **12.11 (83)** | Won by 12 points | Sydney Cricket Ground [A] | 45,129 | |
| Grand Final | Saturday, 26 September (2:30 pm) | Brisbane | **12.17 (89)** | 14.12 (96) | Lost by 7 points | MCG [N] | 100,023 | |

=== Ladder ===
| Pos | Team | Pld | W | L | D | PF | PA | PP | Pts | Qualification |
|---|---|---|---|---|---|---|---|---|---|---|
| **1** | Fremantle | **23** | **19** | **4** | **0** | **2286** | **1666** | **137.2** | 76 | Finals series |
| 2 | Sydney | 23 | 18 | 5 | 0 | 2543 | 1869 | 136.1 | 72 | Finals series |
| 3 | Brisbane Lions (P) | 23 | 16 | 7 | 0 | 2499 | 2054 | 121.7 | 64 | Finals series |
| 4 | Hawthorn | 23 | 15 | 6 | 2 | 2260 | 1881 | 120.1 | 64 | Finals series |
| 5 | Geelong | 23 | 15 | 8 | 0 | 2355 | 1925 | 122.3 | 60 | Finals series |
| 6 | Adelaide | 23 | 15 | 8 | 0 | 2169 | 1849 | 117.3 | 60 | Finals series |
| 7 | Melbourne | 23 | 15 | 8 | 0 | 2301 | 2099 | 109.6 | 60 | Finals series |
| 8 | Western Bulldogs | 23 | 13 | 9 | 1 | 1901 | 1992 | 95.4 | 54 | Finals series |
| 9 | Collingwood | 23 | 12 | 9 | 2 | 2021 | 1974 | 102.4 | 52 | Finals series |
| 10 | Carlton | 23 | 12 | 10 | 1 | 2007 | 1978 | 101.5 | 50 | Finals series |
| 11 | St Kilda | 23 | 10 | 13 | 0 | 2030 | 1974 | 102.8 | 40 | |
| 12 | Greater Western Sydney | 23 | 10 | 13 | 0 | 2073 | 2095 | 98.9 | 40 | |
| 13 | Gold Coast | 23 | 9 | 14 | 0 | 2011 | 2128 | 94.5 | 36 | |
| 14 | North Melbourne | 23 | 9 | 14 | 0 | 1932 | 2175 | 88.8 | 36 | |
| 15 | Port Adelaide | 23 | 7 | 16 | 0 | 1804 | 2048 | 88.1 | 28 | |
| 16 | West Coast | 23 | 4 | 19 | 0 | 1615 | 2333 | 69.2 | 16 | |
| 17 | Richmond | 23 | 3 | 20 | 0 | 1483 | 2373 | 62.5 | 12 | |
| 18 | Essendon | 23 | 2 | 21 | 0 | 1601 | 2478 | 64.6 | 8 | |

Source: afl.com.au
Rules for classification: 1) points; 2) percentage; 3) number of points for
(P) Premiers

== Statistics ==
As of the end of 2026 season. Players without appearances not included

| No. | Name | Pos. | Games | Goals | Behinds | Kicks | Handballs | Disposals | Marks | Tackles | Hitouts |
|---|---|---|---|---|---|---|---|---|---|---|---|
| 2 | Jaeger O'Meara | MF | 6 | 0 | 2 | 45 | 49 | 94 | 17 | 17 | 0 |
| 3 | Caleb Serong | MF | 6 | 11 | 6 | 323 | 265 | 588 | 56 | 109 | 0 |
| 4 | Sean Darcy | RU | 7 | 2 | 1 | 19 | 31 | 50 | 7 | 12 | 128 |
| 5 | Heath Chapman | DF | 26 | 1 | 1 | 232 | 167 | 399 | 137 | 52 | 0 |
| 6 | Jordan Clark | DF | 27 | 2 | 1 | 385 | 220 | 605 | 128 | 54 | 0 |
| 8 | Andrew Brayshaw | MF | 27 | 8 | 8 | 305 | 361 | 666 | 89 | 161 | 0 |
| 9 | Luke Jackson | RU | 27 | 29 | 18 | 195 | 303 | 498 | 77 | 137 | 716 |
| 10 | Shai Bolton | MF/FW | 26 | 25 | 15 | 320 | 273 | 593 | 76 | 97 | 0 |
| 11 | Tobyn Murray | FW | 1 | 1 | 1 | 6 | 7 | 13 | 2 | 4 | 0 |
| 13 | Luke Ryan | DF | 26 | 0 | 1 | 391 | 123 | 514 | 175 | 46 | 0 |
| 14 | Jeremy Sharp | MF | 2 | 2 | 0 | 15 | 9 | 24 | 12 | 2 | 0 |
| 16 | Murphy Reid | MF/FW | 25 | 13 | 20 | 302 | 278 | 580 | 79 | 52 | 0 |
| 17 | Judd McVee | DF | 24 | 1 | 0 | 198 | 163 | 361 | 95 | 17 | 0 |
| 18 | Mason Cox | RU | 20 | 7 | 9 | 81 | 48 | 129 | 46 | 24 | 280 |
| 20 | Patrick Voss | FW | 26 | 49 | 35 | 179 | 99 | 278 | 104 | 82 | 0 |
| 21 | Oscar McDonald | DF | 14 | 1 | 1 | 129 | 50 | 179 | 74 | 24 | 0 |
| 23 | Karl Worner | DF | 27 | 0 | 3 | 317 | 186 | 503 | 164 | 63 | 0 |
| 24 | Jye Amiss | FW | 26 | 64 | 34 | 175 | 66 | 241 | 117 | 25 | 0 |
| 25 | Alex Pearce | DF | 24 | 0 | 0 | 98 | 110 | 208 | 81 | 20 | 0 |
| 26 | Hayden Young | MF/FW | 18 | 12 | 6 | 186 | 161 | 347 | 71 | 63 | 1 |
| 28 | Neil Erasmus | MF | 27 | 8 | 8 | 247 | 222 | 469 | 107 | 74 | 0 |
| 30 | Nathan O'Driscoll | MF | 17 | 5 | 4 | 138 | 151 | 189 | 66 | 35 | 0 |
| 31 | Brandon Walker | DF | 2 | 0 | 0 | 10 | 12 | 11 | 2 | 2 | 0 |
| 32 | Michael Frederick | MF | 22 | 27 | 11 | 170 | 86 | 256 | 81 | 53 | 0 |
| 34 | Corey Wagner | MF | 16 | 0 | 4 | 168 | 103 | 271 | 55 | 46 | 0 |
| 35 | Josh Treacy | FW | 27 | 57 | 41 | 233 | 98 | 331 | 167 | 63 | 0 |
| 36 | Brennan Cox | DF | 18 | 0 | 0 | 133 | 76 | 209 | 86 | 28 | 0 |
| 39 | Sam Switkowski | FW | 26 | 13 | 14 | 128 | 196 | 324 | 68 | 72 | 0 |
| 41 | Bailey Banfield | DF | 1 | 0 | 1 | 4 | 10 | 14 | 3 | 3 | 0 |
| 43 | Isaiah Dudley | FW | 27 | 34 | 21 | 165 | 120 | 285 | 48 | 68 | 0 |
| 44 | Matthew Johnson | MF | 26 | 6 | 6 | 202 | 252 | 454 | 84 | 83 | 0 |
| 45 | Chris Scerri | FW | 9 | 1 | 2 | 19 | 67 | 86 | 9 | 17 | 0 |

== Goalkickers ==
As of end of 2026 season. Players without goals not included

| Name | Goals | Games | Averages |
|---|---|---|---|
| Jye Amiss | 64 | 26 | 2.46 |
| Josh Treacy | 57 | 27 | 2.11 |
| Patrick Voss | 49 | 26 | 1.88 |
| Isaiah Dudley | 34 | 27 | 1.26 |
| Luke Jackson | 29 | 27 | 1.07 |
| Michael Frederick | 27 | 22 | 1.23 |
| Shai Bolton | 25 | 26 | 0.96 |
| Murphy Reid | 13 | 25 | 0.52 |
| Sam Switkowski | 13 | 26 | 0.5 |
| Hayden Young | 12 | 18 | 0.67 |
| Caleb Serong | 11 | 24 | 0.46 |
| Andrew Brayshaw | 8 | 27 | 0.3 |
| Neil Erasmus | 8 | 27 | 0.3 |
| Mason Cox | 7 | 20 | 0.35 |
| Matthew Johnson | 6 | 26 | 0.23 |
| Nathan O'Driscoll | 5 | 17 | 0.29 |
| Jordan Clark | 2 | 27 | 0.07 |
| Sean Darcy | 2 | 7 | 0.29 |
| Jeremy Sharp | 2 | 2 | 1 |
| Heath Chapman | 1 | 26 | 0.04 |
| Judd McVee | 1 | 24 | 0.04 |
| Oscar McDonald | 1 | 14 | 0.07 |
| Chris Scerri | 1 | 9 | 0.11 |
| Tobyn Murray | 1 | 1 | 1 |

== Milestones ==
=== Round 1 ===
- Judd McVee – Fremantle debut

=== Round 2 ===
- Chris Scerri – AFL debut

=== Round 6 ===
- Mason Cox – Fremantle debut
- Shai Bolton – 100th AFL goal

=== Round 8 ===
- Luke Jackson (footballer) – 100th AFL goal

=== Round 11 ===
- Neil Erasmus – 50th AFL game

=== Round 15 ===
- Neil Erasmus – 50th AFL game

=== Round 19 ===
- Brennan Cox – 150th AFL game
- Mason Cox – 150th AFL game

=== Round 20 ===
- Karl Worner – 50th AFL game
- Nathan O'Driscoll – 50th AFL game
- Oscar McDonald – 100th AFL game

=== Round 21 ===
- Hayden Young – 100th AFL game
- Josh Treacy – 100th AFL game

=== Round 23 ===
- Luke Ryan – 200th AFL game

=== Round 24 ===
- Tobyn Murray – AFL debut

=== Qualifying final ===
- Jordan Clark – 150th AFL game

=== Preliminary final ===
- Caleb Serong – 150th AFL game
