= Karl Worner =

Australian rules footballer (born 2002)

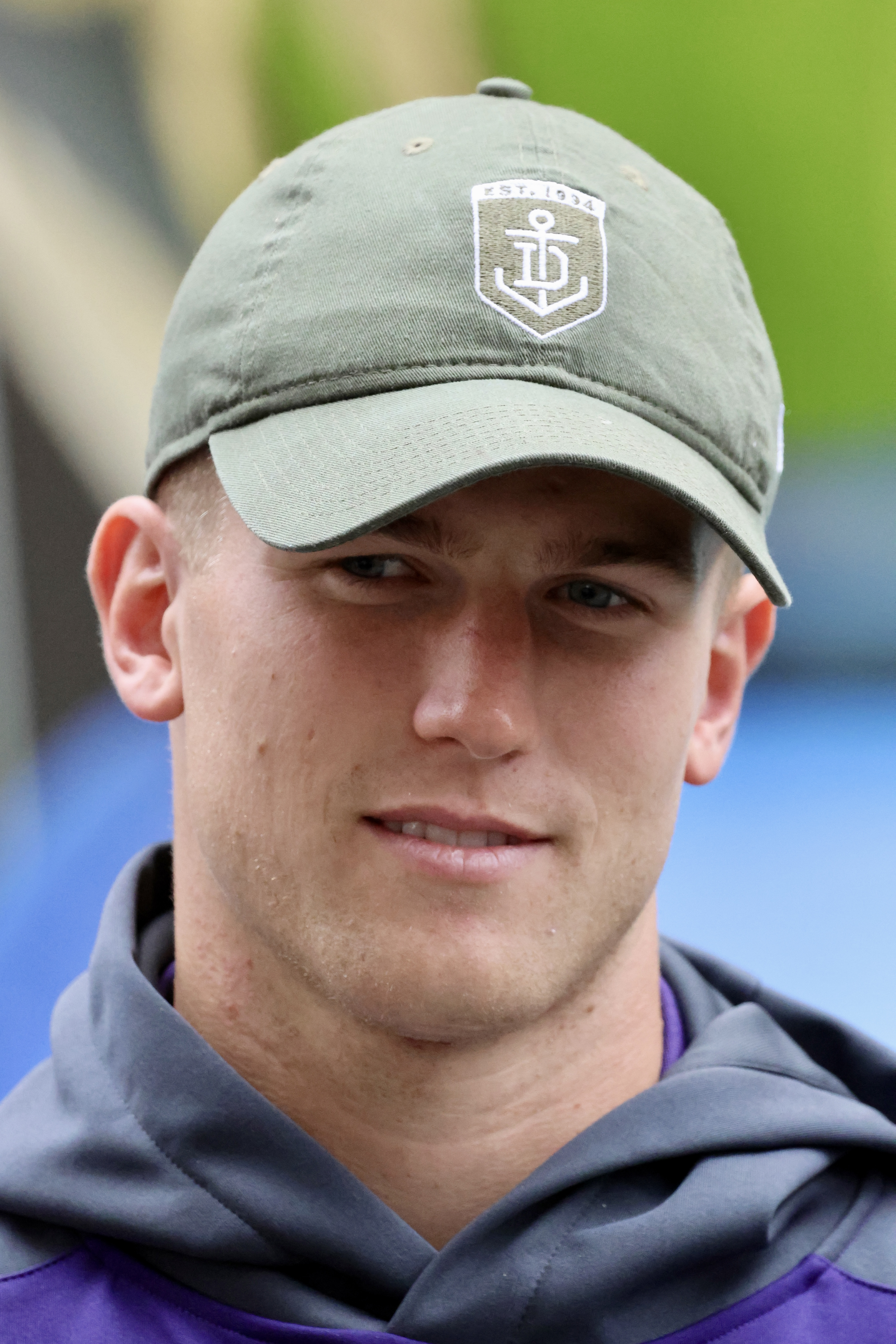
- Worner at the 2026 Gather Round

Personal information
- Born: 16 June 2002 (age 24)
- Original team: Oakleigh Chargers
- Draft: No. 8, 2022 rookie draft
- Height: 188 cm (6 ft 2 in)
- Weight: 83 kg (183 lb)
- Position: Half Back

Club information
- Current club: Fremantle
- Number: 23

Playing career^{1}
Years	Club	Games (Goals)
2022–	Fremantle	58 (0)
- ^{1} Playing statistics correct to the end of 2026.

Career highlights
- WAFL premiership player: 2024

Karl Worner (born 16 June 2002) is a professional Australian rules footballer who plays for the Fremantle Football Club in the Australian Football League (AFL).

== Early career ==
Originally from Victoria, Karl played for the Oakleigh Chargers in the Talent League. He grew up playing junior football for local clubs East Burwood Rams and Ashburton Redbacks. He also played school football for Carey Grammar.

Although he was drafted in 2021, border restrictions due to the COVID-19 pandemic meant he was unable to travel from Victoria to Western Australia until February of the following year. He spent 2022 playing for Fremantle's reserve side, Peel Thunder in the West Australian Football League. Worner was impressive on debut collecting 31 disposals and kicking two goals against East Fremantle.

== AFL career ==
Worner was selected by Fremantle in their 1st selection and 8th overall in the 2022 rookie draft. In June 2023, Worner signed a 2-year contract extension keeping him at Fremantle until the end of the 2025 AFL season. Worner made his debut for Fremantle in Round 17 of the 2023 AFL season for their clash against Carlton. Worner started as the substitute and was substituted in for Matthew Johnson during the 3rd quarter. Worner finished his debut match with 7 disposals, a mark, and a tackle. After suffering a minor injury during his debut, Worner returned to the WAFL for a few weeks before coming back into the senior side to play the final 3 matches of the season for Fremantle.

Worner made the line-up for Fremantle's opening game of the 2024 AFL season against the Brisbane Lions at Optus Stadium. He played well, collecting 12 disposals during the match. Unfortunately, Worner was knocked unconscious in the third quarter after an accidental collision with Lions player Lincoln McCarthy. He suffered a concussion which placed him under the AFL's mandatory concussion protocols, meaning he would miss at least one week of football. He would make his return through the WAFL, and returned to the Dockers line-up in round fourteen against the Western Bulldogs at Marvel Stadium, as a late replacement for Heath Chapman.

Worner signed a two-year contract extension in late July 2025, tying him to Fremantle until at least the end of 2027.

== Personal life ==
Worner's mother is from Sweden, and he has dual citizenship for both Australia and Sweden.

== Statistics ==
Updated to the end of round 22, 2026.

Legend
G	Goals	K	Kicks	D	Disposals	T	Tackles
B	Behinds	H	Handballs	M	Marks

Season	Team	No.	Games	Totals							Averages (per game)							Votes
Season	Team	No.	Games	G	B	K	H	D	M	T	G	B	K	H	D	M	T	Votes
2022	Fremantle	40	0	—	—	—	—	—	—	—	—	—	—	—	—	—	—	0
2023	Fremantle	40	4	0	1	23	21	44	12	1	0.0	0.3	5.8	5.3	11.0	3.0	0.3	0
2024	Fremantle	23	4	0	0	18	20	38	11	4	0.0	0.0	4.5	5.0	9.5	2.8	1.0	0
2025	Fremantle	23	23	0	4	179	137	316	94	49	0.0	0.2	7.8	6.0	13.7	4.1	2.1	0
2026	Fremantle	23	21	0	2	254	150	404	136	50	0.0	0.1	12.1	7.1	19.2	6.5	2.4	0
Career			52	0	7	474	328	802	253	104	0.0	0.1	9.1	6.3	15.4	4.9	2.0	0
