= Nathan O'Driscoll =

Australian rules football player (born 2002)

Personal information
- Full name: Nathan O'Driscoll
- Nicknames: Drizzy, Nod, Noddy
- Born: 17 May 2002 (age 24)
- Original team: Perth (WAFL)
- Draft: No. 27, 2020 national draft
- Debut: Round 2 2022, Fremantle vs. St Kilda, at Optus Stadium
- Height: 188 cm (6 ft 2 in)
- Weight: 82 kg (181 lb)
- Position: Midfielder

Club information
- Current club: Richmond

Playing career^{1}
Years	Club	Games (Goals)
2021–2026	Fremantle	55 (20)
2027–	Richmond	0 (0)
- ^{1} Playing statistics correct to the end of the 2026 season.

Career highlights
- Rising Star Nomination: 2022; Goal of the Year Nomination: (R8 2022), (R21 2022); 2x WAFL premiership player: 2024, 2026

Nathan O'Driscoll (born 17 May 2002) is an Australian rules footballer playing for the Richmond Football Club in the Australian Football League (AFL).

== AFL career ==
O'Driscoll was drafted with Fremantle's second selection, the 27th overall, in the 2020 national draft.

=== 2022: Debut Season ===
After not playing any AFL games in 2021, he made his AFL debut as the medical substitute for Fremantle in round 2 of the 2022 AFL season against St Kilda. He entered the game in the final quarter after Sean Darcy injured his ankle and kicked a spectacular goal with his first kick from near the boundary line. He received his first Goal of the Year nomination in round 8 against the North Melbourne Kangaroos with an incredible set shot drop punt from the left pocket. O'Driscoll was sidelined prior to round 9 due to a stress fracture in his foot.

Nathan returned to the line-up for Fremantle in the round 21 clash against the Western Bulldogs. O'Driscoll earned the defining moment of the game in which he received the ball just outside of centre square before outpacing Western Bulldogs vice captain Jack Macrae and kicking a goal from the 50-metre arc. He finished the game having earnt his second Goal of the Year nomination. O'Driscoll received a 2022 AFL Rising Star nomination for his performance in round 23 against Greater Western Sydney at Manuka Oval in Canberra. He finished with 2 goals, 17 disposals, five inside 50s, five clearances and four tackles in the 20 point win.

=== 2023–2024 ===
After playing 10 games in 2023, O'Driscoll only managed 2 matches in 2024, with injuries keeping him sidelined for a significant portion of the year. He was a part of the Peel Thunder team that won the 2024 WAFL Grand Final. O'Driscoll signed a two-year contract extension at the end of the 2024 AFL season, to remain at Fremantle until at least 2026.

2025 — Present

Following a career best 2025 AFL season, where O'Driscoll averaged 15.9 disposals in 14 games, O'Driscoll took another step in 2026, playing a career best 17 games and averaging career highs for disposals (17.0), and kicking efficiency (67.4%). But after being left out of Fremantle's team after their qualifying final loss to Hawthorn in favour of Corey Wagner, and not returning for the rest of the season, including the Grand Final loss to Brisbane, O'Driscoll sought a trade out of the Dockers. The Western Bulldogs were originally the frontrunners, but on Tuesday, 6th of October 2026, on the 2nd day of the AFL Trade Period, O'Driscoll was traded to the Richmond Tigers in exchange for Pick 61 in the only trade of the day, signing a 3-year deal with the Melbourne based side.

== Personal life ==
O'Driscoll grew up in Northam, Western Australia.

His older sister, Emma O'Driscoll also plays for Fremantle in the AFLW. His younger brother, Aiden O'Driscoll, was drafted to the Western Bulldogs for the 2024 AFL season but medically retired on 14 May 2024 without playing a game after suffering a head injury during the pre-season.

== Statistics ==
Updated to the end of round 22, 2026.

Legend
G	Goals	K	Kicks	D	Disposals	T	Tackles
B	Behinds	H	Handballs	M	Marks

Season	Team	No.	Games	Totals							Averages (per game)							Votes
Season	Team	No.	Games	G	B	K	H	D	M	T	G	B	K	H	D	M	T	Votes
2022	Fremantle	30	12	10	6	103	75	178	42	19	0.8	0.5	8.6	6.3	14.8	3.5	1.6	0
2023	Fremantle	30	10	1	2	92	43	135	43	20	0.1	0.2	9.2	4.3	13.5	4.3	2.0	0
2024	Fremantle	30	2	1	1	11	14	25	5	5	0.5	0.5	5.5	7.0	12.5	2.5	2.5	0
2025	Fremantle	30	14	3	6	122	100	222	42	45	0.2	0.4	8.7	7.1	15.9	3.0	3.2	0
2026	Fremantle	30	14	5	4	116	134	250	57	30	0.4	0.3	8.3	9.6	17.9	4.1	2.1	0
Career			52	20	19	444	366	810	189	119	0.4	0.4	8.5	7.0	15.6	3.6	2.3	0
