= Chris Scerri =

Australian rules footballer (born 2006)

- Scerri in August 2025

Personal information
- Full name: Christopher Scerri
- Born: 6 July 2006 (age 20)
- Original teams: Northern Bullants (VFL); Strathmore (EDFL)
- Draft: Pre-season supplemental selection period
- Debut: Round 2, 2026, Fremantle vs. Melbourne, at Optus Stadium
- Height: 177 cm (5 ft 10 in)
- Position: Forward

Club information
- Current club: Fremantle
- Number: 45

Playing career^{1}
Years	Club	Games (Goals)
2026–	Fremantle	9 (1)
- ^{1} Playing statistics correct to the end of 2026.

Career highlights
- West Australian Football League premiership player: 2026; Beacon Award: 2026

Christopher Scerri (born 6 July 2006) is a professional Australian rules footballer who plays for the Fremantle Football Club in the Australian Football League (AFL).

== Early life ==
Scerri is from Melbourne, Victoria. He attended St Bernard's College in Melbourne, playing school football and winning their best and fairest award in 2024. In 2025, he played for the Northern Bullants in what was their last season in the Victorian Football League before signing with Richmond's VFL team for 2026. However, he was invited to train with Fremantle in the pre-season and was drafted as a supplemental selection period signing in February 2026.

== AFL career ==
Scerri made his debut for Fremantle in Round 2 of the 2026 AFL season against Melbourne at Optus Stadium. In July, Scerri signed a two-year contract extension, keeping him at Fremantle until at least the end of 2028.

Despite not being called to play in the match, Scerri was selected as an emergency substitute for the 2026 AFL Grand Final, along with teammates Brennan Cox and Jaeger O'Meara.

== Statistics ==
Updated to the end of 2026.

Legend
G	Goals	K	Kicks	D	Disposals	T	Tackles
B	Behinds	H	Handballs	M	Marks

Season	Team	No.	Games	Totals							Averages (per game)							Votes
Season	Team	No.	Games	G	B	K	H	D	M	T	G	B	K	H	D	M	T	Votes
2026	Fremantle	45	9	1	2	19	67	86	9	17	0.1	0.2	2.1	7.4	9.6	1.0	1.9	0
Career			9	1	2	19	67	86	9	17	0.1	0.2	2.1	7.4	9.6	1.0	1.9	0
