= Liam Reidy (footballer) =

Australian rules football player

Personal information
- Full name: Liam Reidy
- Born: 14 June 2000 (age 26)
- Original team: Frankston
- Draft: No. 13, 2023 Rookie draft
- Debut: Round 23, 2024, Fremantle vs. Greater Western Sydney, at Sydney Showground Stadium
- Height: 204 cm (6 ft 8 in)
- Weight: 104 kg (229 lb)
- Position: Ruck

Club information
- Current club: Carlton
- Number: 25

Playing career^{1}
Years	Club	Games (Goals)
2023–2025	Fremantle	3 (0)
2026–	Carlton	4 (0)
Total		7 (0)
- ^{1} Playing statistics correct to the end of round 22, 2026.

Career highlights
- WAFL premiership player: 2024; Peel Thunder Best & Fairest: 2025

Liam Reidy (born 14 June 2000) is a professional Australian rules footballer who currently plays for the Carlton Football Club in the Australian Football League (AFL).

== Early career ==
Reidy was often injured during his junior years, and never played Under 18's football in the Talent League. In 2021 he played one game for Frankston in the Victorian Football League (VFL) as a forward, before returning in 2022 to become Frankston's main ruckman. At the end of the season he was selected by Fremantle with the 13th selection in the 2023 rookie draft. He spent the entire 2023 season and most of the 2024 season playing for Fremantle's affiliate team Peel Thunder in the West Australian Football League (WAFL).

== AFL career ==
Reidy made his AFL debut in the second last round of the 2024 AFL season as a replacement for the injured Sean Darcy. He signed a one-year contract extension at the season's end. On September 10, 2025, it was reported that Liam Reidy, along with teammate Will Brodie, had requested a trade from Fremantle, with Reidy specifically seeking a move to Carlton. This development followed earlier reports from the previous month indicating that Carlton had shown strong interest in acquiring Reidy. Reidy was officially traded to Carlton on 7 October. He made his Carlton debut in Opening Round of the 2026 AFL season.

== Statistics ==
Updated to the end of round 22, 2026.

Legend
G	Goals	K	Kicks	D	Disposals	T	Tackles
B	Behinds	H	Handballs	M	Marks	H/O	Hit-outs

Season	Team	No.	Games	Totals								Averages (per game)								Votes
Season	Team	No.	Games	G	B	K	H	D	M	T	H/O	G	B	K	H	D	M	T	H/O	Votes
2023	Fremantle	42	0	—	—	—	—	—	—	—	—	—	—	—	—	—	—	—	—	0
2024	Fremantle	42	2	0	0	6	4	10	0	7	50	0.0	0.0	3.0	2.0	5.0	0.0	3.5	25.0	0
2025	Fremantle	18	1	0	0	4	2	6	1	2	18	0.0	0.0	4.0	2.0	6.0	1.0	2.0	18.0	0
2026	Carlton	25	4	0	1	20	22	42	3	14	65	0.0	0.3	5.0	5.5	10.5	0.8	3.5	16.3	0
Career			7	0	1	30	28	58	4	23	133	0.0	0.1	4.3	4.0	8.3	0.6	3.3	19.0	0
