= Hugh Davies (footballer) =

Australian rules footballer

Personal information
- Born: 28 September 2004 (age 22); Perth, Western Australia
- Original team: Claremont
- Draft: No. 33, 2022 national draft
- Height: 196 cm (6 ft 5 in)
- Weight: 90 kg (198 lb)
- Position: Defender

Club information
- Current club: Fremantle
- Number: 12

Playing career^{1}
Years	Club	Games (Goals)
2023–	Fremantle	2 (0)
- ^{1} Playing statistics correct to the end of the 2025 season.

Career highlights
- 2x West Australian Football League premiership player: 2024, 2026; Tuckey Medal (Peel Thunder Best & Fairest): 2026

Hugh Davies (born 28 September 2004) is a professional Australian rules footballer who plays for Fremantle. He also plays for Peel Thunder in the Western Australian Football League (WAFL). Davies went to school at Christ Church Grammar School in Perth.

== WAFL career ==
Davies was drafted by Fremantle with the 33rd selection in the 2022 AFL draft from the Claremont Football Club, Fremantle's first selection in that draft. At junior level he represented Western Australia at the 2022 AFL National Championships.

In 2023 he made his senior debut for Peel Thunder, Fremantle's WAFL aligned team, against East Fremantle Football Club, at Lane Group Stadium, in Round 1 of the season. He collected 8 disposals in their 4-point win. Davies finished his first season playing for Peel Thunder with 19 league matches under his belt including a Grand Final loss to East Fremantle.

Davies was a part of Peel Thunder's premiership team in the 2024 WAFL season, finishing with 8 disposals.

2026 was a breakout year for Davies, averaging 19.5 disposals and 8 marks per game. He played 20 games for the season. Among these was a 20 mark, 27 disposal game against South Fremantle in round 7. Davies won another premiership with Peel, where he collected 24 disposals.

== AFL career ==
After a season and a half playing for Peel as a key defender, Davies made his AFL debut in round 15 of the 2024 AFL season against Gold Coast. Davies was ultimately subbed out in round 16 with minimal impact at the top level, and was subsequently dropped back to the WAFL. After a promising season, Davies was rewarded a new contract until the end of the 2026 AFL season.

In 2026, Davies had been listed as an emergency 11 times (as of Preliminary final 2026), through his strong WAFL performances, but he couldn't break into the team despite injuries to teammates Brennan Cox and Alex Pearce. After attracting strong interest from rival clubs, he signed a 3 year contract extension with Fremantle, lasting until the end of 2029.

=== WAFL Statistics ===
Statistics are correct to round 7 2026.

Legend
G	Goals	K	Kicks	D	Disposals	T	Tackles
B	Behinds	H	Handballs	M	Marks

Season	Team	No.	Games	Totals							Averages (per game)						
Season	Team	No.	Games	G	B	K	H	D	M	T	G	B	K	H	D	M	T
2023	Peel Thunder	6/64	19	0	1	94	87	181	62	21	0.0	0.1	4.9	4.6	9.5	3.3	1.1
2024	Peel Thunder	6	20	0	0	112	108	220	90	19	0.0	0.0	5.6	5.4	11.0	4.5	1.0
2025	Peel Thunder	10	18	2	0	123	121	244	94	31	0.1	0.0	6.8	6.7	13.6	5.2	1.7
2026	Peel Thunder	10	7	0	0	88	52	140	67	11	0.0	0.0	12.6	7.4	20.0	9.6	1.6
Career			64	2	1	417	368	785	313	82	0.0	0.0	6.5	5.8	12.3	4.9	1.3

== Statistics ==
Updated to the end of the 2025 season.

Legend
G	Goals	K	Kicks	D	Disposals	T	Tackles
B	Behinds	H	Handballs	M	Marks

Season	Team	No.	Games	Totals							Averages (per game)							Votes
Season	Team	No.	Games	G	B	K	H	D	M	T	G	B	K	H	D	M	T	Votes
2023	Fremantle	12	0	—	—	—	—	—	—	—	—	—	—	—	—	—	—	0
2024	Fremantle	12	2	0	0	4	4	8	3	3	0.0	0.0	2.0	2.0	4.0	1.5	1.5	0
2025	Fremantle	12	0	—	—	—	—	—	—	—	—	—	—	—	—	—	—	0
Career			2	0	0	4	4	8	3	3	0.0	0.0	2.0	2.0	4.0	1.5	1.5	0
