= Judd McVee =

Australian rules footballer

- Judd McVee in the 2026 AFL Grand Final parade

Personal information
- Full name: Judd McVee
- Born: 7 August 2003 (age 23)
- Original team: East Fremantle (WAFL)
- Draft: No. 18, 2022 rookie draft
- Debut: Round 1, 2023, Melbourne vs. Western Bulldogs, at MCG
- Height: 185 cm (6 ft 1 in)
- Weight: 76 kg (168 lb)
- Position: Defender

Club information
- Current club: Fremantle
- Number: 17

Playing career^{1}
Years	Club	Games (Goals)
2022–2025	Melbourne	65 (1)
2026–	Fremantle	23 (1)
Total		88 (2)
- ^{1} Playing statistics correct to the end of the preliminary final, 2026.

Career highlights
- Harold Ball Memorial Trophy: 2023; AFL Rising Star nominee: 2023; VFL premiership player: 2022

Judd McVee (born 7 August 2003) is a professional Australian rules footballer playing for the Fremantle Football Club in the Australian Football League (AFL), having previously played for Melbourne. He played for Rover Football Club in Geraldton, Western Australia, and attended Geraldton Senior High School.

McVee was drafted by Melbourne with their first selection and eighteenth overall in the 2022 rookie draft. He made his debut in the fifty point win to Western Bulldogs at the Melbourne Cricket Ground in the opening round of the 2023 season. He wore number 41 in his first two seasons, until changing to 4 before season 2024. He was traded to Fremantle following the 2025 AFL season, along with his partner Lily Johnson, who plays in the AFL Women's league.

McVee played his first game for Fremantle in Round 1 of the 2026 AFL season against Geelong at GMHBA Stadium.

== Statistics ==
Updated to the end of round 22, 2026.

Legend
G	Goals	K	Kicks	D	Disposals	T	Tackles
B	Behinds	H	Handballs	M	Marks

Season	Team	No.	Games	Totals							Averages (per game)							Votes
Season	Team	No.	Games	G	B	K	H	D	M	T	G	B	K	H	D	M	T	Votes
2022	Melbourne	41	0	—	—	—	—	—	—	—	—	—	—	—	—	—	—	0
2023	Melbourne	41	25	0	0	192	128	320	69	34	0.0	0.0	7.7	5.1	12.8	2.8	1.4	0
2024	Melbourne	4	23	1	2	259	123	382	80	23	0.0	0.1	11.3	5.3	16.6	3.5	1.0	1
2025	Melbourne	4	17	0	2	154	90	244	76	15	0.0	0.1	9.1	5.3	14.4	4.5	0.9	0
2026	Fremantle	17	20	1	0	169	142	311	85	14	0.1	0.0	8.5	7.1	15.6	4.3	0.7	0
Career			85	2	4	774	483	1257	310	86	0.0	0.0	9.1	5.7	14.8	3.6	1.0	1
