= Tobyn Murray =

Australian rules footballer (born 2005)

Personal information
- Born: 5 May 2005 (age 21); Colac, Victoria
- Original teams: Geelong (VFL); Colac (GFNL)
- Draft: No. 40, 2025 national draft
- Debut: Round 24, 2026, Fremantle vs. Carlton, at Docklands Stadium
- Height: 180 cm (5 ft 11 in)
- Position: Small forward

Club information
- Current club: Fremantle
- Number: 11

Playing career^{1}
Years	Club	Games (Goals)
2026–	Fremantle	1 (1)
- ^{1} Playing statistics correct to the end of Round 23, 2026.

Career highlights
- West Australian Football League premiership player: 2026

Tobyn Murray (born 5 May 2005) is a professional Australian rules footballer who plays for the Fremantle Football Club in the Australian Football League (AFL).

== Early life ==
Murray is from Colac, Victoria. He played junior and senior football for the Colac Football Club in the Geelong Football Netball League (GFNL), winning their Rising Star award in 2024. He later joined the Geelong Football Club's reserves side in the Victorian Football League (VFL), enjoying a breakout season in 2025 where he kicked 22 goals across 17 matches.

== AFL career ==
After being overlooked in the two preceding national drafts (2023 and 2024), Murray was selected as a mature-age draftee by the Fremantle Football Club with pick 40 in the 2025 AFL national draft. Murray was named to make his senior debut against Carlton at Docklands Stadium in the final round of the 2026 season.

== Statistics ==
Updated to the end of round 24, 2026.

Legend
G	Goals	K	Kicks	D	Disposals	T	Tackles
B	Behinds	H	Handballs	M	Marks

Season	Team	No.	Games	Totals							Averages (per game)							Votes
Season	Team	No.	Games	G	B	K	H	D	M	T	G	B	K	H	D	M	T	Votes
2026	Fremantle	11	1	1	1	6	7	13	2	4	1.0	1.0	6.0	7.0	13.0	2.0	4.0	0
Career			1	1	1	6	7	13	2	4	1.0	1.0	6.0	7.0	13.0	2.0	4.0	0
