= Neil Erasmus =

Australian rules football player

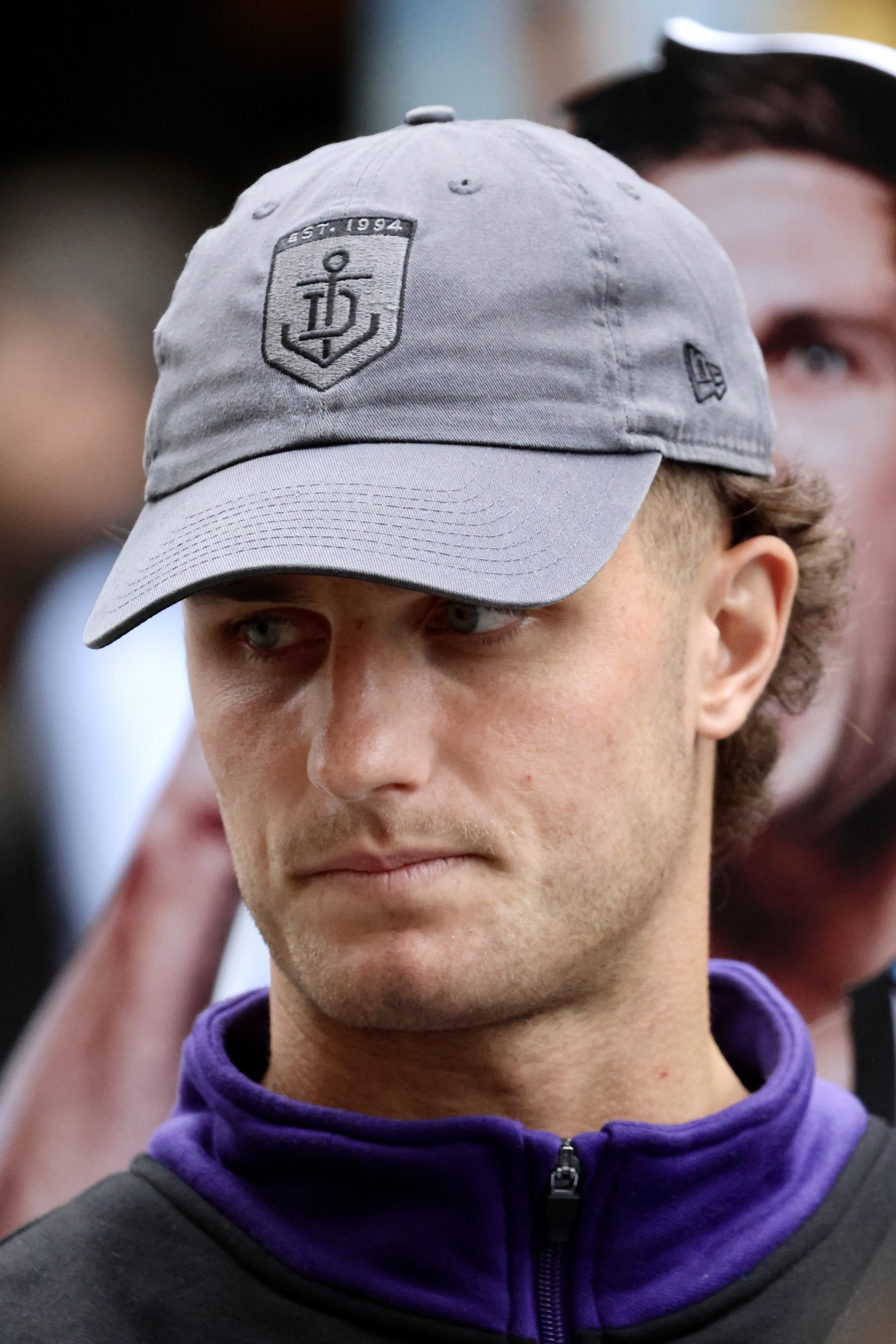
- Erasmus at the 2026 Gather Round

Personal information
- Nickname: Raz
- Born: 2 December 2003 (age 22); Johannesburg, South Africa
- Original team: Subiaco (WAFL)
- Draft: No. 10, 2021 national draft
- Height: 190 cm (6 ft 3 in)
- Weight: 83 kg (183 lb)
- Position: Midfielder

Club information
- Current club: Fremantle
- Number: 28

Playing career^{1}
Years	Club	Games (Goals)
2022–	Fremantle	66 (12)
- ^{1} Playing statistics correct to the end of the 2026 season.

Career highlights
- WAFL premiership player: 2024; Simpson Medal: 2024 (WAFL Grand Final); Peel Thunder Best & Fairest: 2024

Neil Erasmus (born 2 December 2003) is an Australian rules football player who plays for Fremantle in the Australian Football League (AFL).

== Early life ==
Erasmus was born in Johannesburg, South Africa. A talented junior athlete Erasmus played cricket at district junior level for Scarborough, and Under-18s football for Subiaco in the WAFL colts.

== AFL career ==
Erasmus was drafted with Fremantle's second selection, the 10th overall, in the 2021 national draft. He made his AFL debut for Fremantle in the Western Derby in round 3 of the 2022 AFL season, collecting 18 disposals.

Erasmus was among Fremantle's best during round 18 of the 2023 AFL season against Collingwood at the MCG, collecting 26 disposals, 12 contested possessions and 10 tackles. He finished his second season at Fremantle having played fourteen games.

In September 2024, Erasmus was awarded the Simpson Medal as the player adjudged best on ground in the 2024 WAFL Grand Final against East Perth. He also won Peel Thunder's Best and Fairest award, the Tuckey Medal, for their 2024 WAFL season.

Erasmus played 16 games throughout the 2025 AFL season, a career-best, and was selected by Fremantle to play in his first finals series, an elimination final against the Gold Coast at Optus Stadium.

== Statistics ==
Updated to the end of round 22, 2026.

Legend
G	Goals	K	Kicks	D	Disposals	T	Tackles
B	Behinds	H	Handballs	M	Marks

Season	Team	No.	Games	Totals							Averages (per game)							Votes
Season	Team	No.	Games	G	B	K	H	D	M	T	G	B	K	H	D	M	T	Votes
2022	Fremantle	28	5	1	2	28	26	54	13	11	0.2	0.4	5.6	5.2	10.8	2.6	2.2	0
2023	Fremantle	28	14	1	1	94	81	175	43	43	0.1	0.1	6.7	5.8	12.5	3.1	3.1	0
2024	Fremantle	28	4	0	0	13	16	29	7	7	0.0	0.0	3.3	4.0	7.3	1.8	1.8	0
2025	Fremantle	28	16	2	3	121	134	255	43	43	0.1	0.2	7.6	8.4	15.9	2.7	2.7	0
2026	Fremantle	28	21	7	8	190	175	365	85	55	0.3	0.4	9.0	8.3	17.4	4.0	2.6	0
Career			60	11	14	446	432	878	191	159	0.2	0.2	7.4	7.2	14.6	3.2	2.7	0

=== WAFL statistics ===
Statistics are correct to the end of the 2025 season.

Legend
G	Goals	K	Kicks	D	Disposals	T	Tackles
B	Behinds	H	Handballs	M	Marks

Season	Team	No.	Games	Totals							Averages (per game)						
Season	Team	No.	Games	G	B	K	H	D	M	T	G	B	K	H	D	M	T
2022	Peel Thunder	7/34/35	15	12	6	184	162	346	70	75	0.8	0.4	12.3	10.8	23.1	4.7	5.0
2023	Peel Thunder	7	6	2	0	65	68	133	17	38	0.3	0.0	10.8	11.4	22.2	2.8	6.3
2024	Peel Thunder	17/19	17	6	10	213	266	479	81	97	0.4	0.6	12.6	15.6	28.2	4.8	5.7
2025	Peel Thunder	5/19	5	0	4	63	62	125	26	23	0.0	0.8	12.6	12.4	25.0	5.2	4.6
Career			43	20	20	525	558	1083	194	231	0.5	0.5	12.2	13.0	25.2	4.5	5.4
