= Matthew Johnson (Australian footballer) =

Australian rules footballer

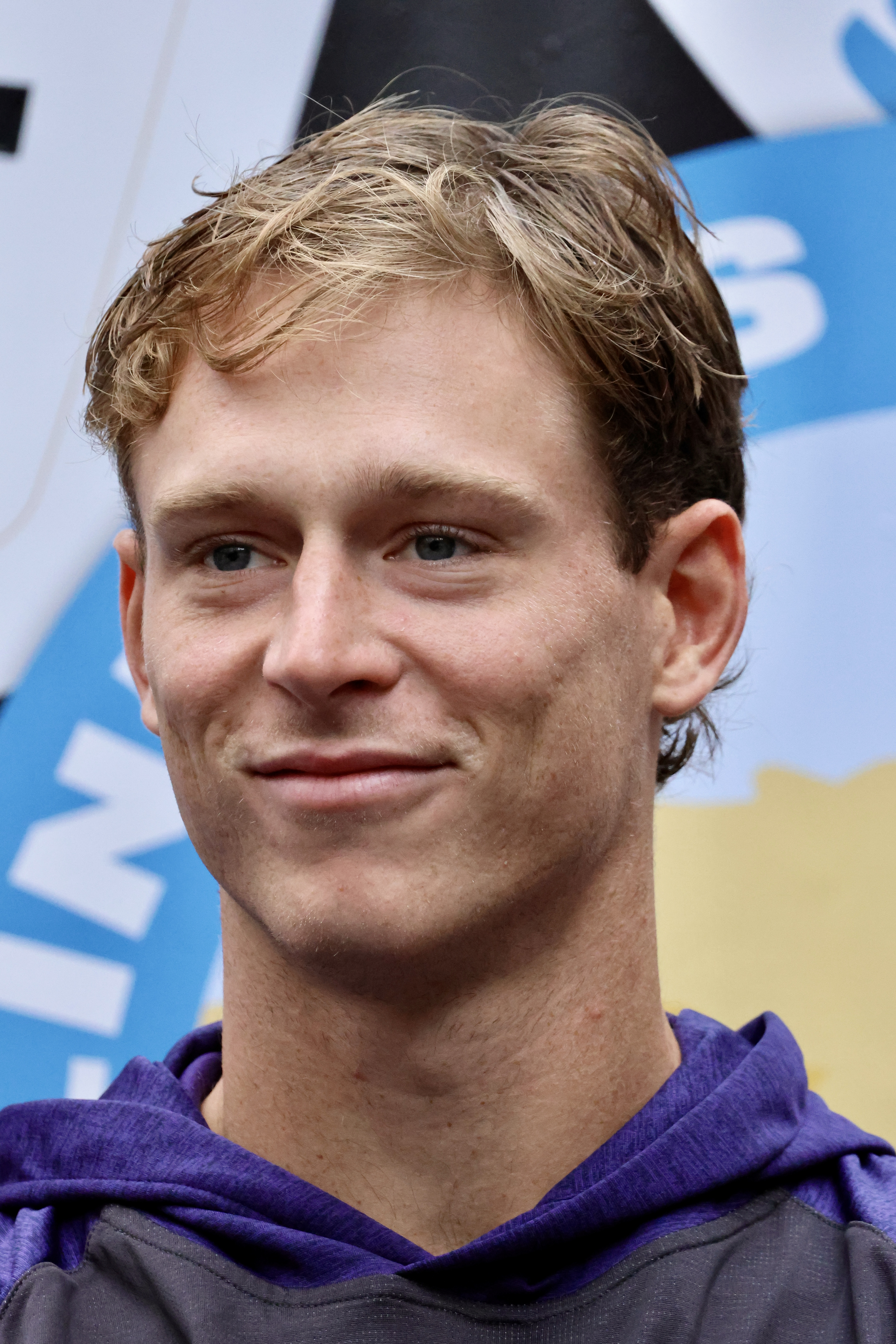
- Johnson at the 2026 Gather Round

Personal information
- Born: 16 March 2003 (age 23)
- Original team: Subiaco
- Draft: No. 21, 2021 National draft
- Debut: Round 3, 2023, Fremantle vs. West Coast, at Optus Stadium
- Height: 193 cm (6 ft 4 in)
- Weight: 89 kg (196 lb)
- Position: Midfielder

Club information
- Current club: Fremantle
- Number: 44

Playing career^{1}
Years	Club	Games (Goals)
2022–	Fremantle	80 (15)
- ^{1} Playing statistics correct to the end of the preliminary finals, 2026.

Career highlights
- Rising Star Nomination: 2023

Matthew Johnson (born 16 March 2003) is a professional Australian rules footballer who plays for the Fremantle Football Club in the Australian Football League (AFL).

== AFL career ==
Johnson was drafted with the first selection of the second round, the 21st selection overall, in the 2021 AFL draft from Subiaco in the West Australian Football League, after being widely predicted to be a first round draft selection.

Johnson debuted for Fremantle in Round 3 of the 2023 AFL season against cross town rivals West Coast. Johnson was the named substitute and came on during the third quarter for injured teammate Heath Chapman. Johnson finished the game with 6 disposals in his first ever win. He received a rising star nomination for his seven mark, nineteen disposal game against Port Adelaide in round 23 of the 2023 season. He collected 20 disposals and kicked a goal the next week against Hawthorn at the MCG.

Johnson made the line-up for Fremantle's opening game of the 2024 AFL season against the Brisbane Lions at Optus Stadium. He finished the match with eleven disposals. He collected twenty-two disposals the next week against North Melbourne at Marvel Stadium. Johnson was an important contributor in round nine against Richmond at the MCG, kicking a goal and equaling his at the time career-best disposal record of 25, a record which coincidentally was set the season prior also against Richmond. He finished his third season at Fremantle having played a career-best 19 games.

Johnson collected a career-high 27 disposals in round one of the 2025 AFL season, against Geelong at GMHBA Stadium. He would equal this record six weeks later against Adelaide at Optus Stadium during the Dockers annual Len Hall Tribute Game. In round 19, in Fremantle's one-point win over Collingwood, Johnson injured his ankle which put him out for the rest of the season.

In May 2026, Johnson signed a four-year contract extension, keeping him at Fremantle until at least the end of 2030. In Round 20 of the 2026 AFL season, Johnson recorded a career-high 29 disposals and seven clearance in Western Derby 63. He placed equal-second in the Glendinning–Allan Medal voting with four votes, tied with Jye Amiss.

== Statistics ==
Updated to the end of round 22, 2026.

Legend
G	Goals	K	Kicks	D	Disposals	T	Tackles
B	Behinds	H	Handballs	M	Marks

Season	Team	No.	Games	Totals							Averages (per game)							Votes
Season	Team	No.	Games	G	B	K	H	D	M	T	G	B	K	H	D	M	T	Votes
2022	Fremantle	44	0	—	—	—	—	—	—	—	—	—	—	—	—	—	—	0
2023	Fremantle	44	18	4	4	131	125	256	59	46	0.2	0.2	7.3	6.9	14.2	3.3	2.6	0
2024	Fremantle	44	19	3	10	152	150	302	68	58	0.2	0.5	8.0	7.9	15.9	3.6	3.1	0
2025	Fremantle	44	18	2	8	160	178	338	74	59	0.1	0.4	8.9	9.9	18.8	4.1	3.3	0
2026	Fremantle	44	20	6	3	155	202	357	65	63	0.3	0.2	7.8	10.1	17.9	3.3	3.2	0
Career			75	15	25	598	655	1253	266	226	0.2	0.3	8.0	8.7	16.7	3.5	3.0	0
