= Brandon Walker =

Australian rules football player (born 2002)

Personal information
- Full name: Brandon Walker
- Nickname: The Don
- Born: 17 October 2002 (age 24); Ghana
- Original team: East Fremantle (WAFL)
- Draft: No. 50, 2020 national draft
- Height: 186 cm (6 ft 1 in)
- Weight: 77 kg (170 lb)
- Position: Half back

Club information
- Current club: Fremantle
- Number: 31

Playing career^{1}
Years	Club	Games (Goals)
2021–	Fremantle	68 (2)
- ^{1} Playing statistics correct to the end of 2026.

Career highlights
- Rising Star Nomination: 2022; Beacon Award: 2022; West Australian Football League premiership player: 2026

Brandon Walker (born 17 October 2002) is an Australian rules football player who plays for the Fremantle Football Club in the Australian Football League (AFL).

== Early career ==
A member of Fremantle's Next Generation Academy (NGA) due to being born in Ghana, Walker was drafted with the 50th selection in the 2020 national draft, when Fremantle matched Essendon's bid. He had played junior football for East Fremantle and represented Western Australia at Under 16 and Under 18 levels. His twin brother, Chris, also plays football for East Fremantle.

== AFL career ==
He was selected to make his AFL debut for Fremantle in round 13 of the 2021 AFL season against Gold Coast, alongside fellow 2020 draftee and NGA member, Joel Western.

Walker received a 2022 AFL Rising Star nomination for his round 13 performance against Hawthorn at Optus Stadium, collecting 16 disposals and kicking a goal. He finished the season having played 21 games.

Walker had a strong start to the 2023 AFL season in which he played 14 consecutive games. However, Walker suffered a knee injury in Round 18 against Collingwood after landing awkwardly during a marking contest, and as a result was ruled out for the remainder of the season. Walker signed a three-year contract extension in December 2023, tying him to Fremantle until at least the end of 2027.

Brandon returned to the Fremantle line-up for their second game of the 2024 AFL season against North Melbourne at Marvel Stadium. He was one of Fremantle's best players in round 9 during their disappointing loss to Sydney at Optus Stadium, collecting 19 disposals and kicking an impressive goal from outside the fifty-metre line.

== Statistics ==
Updated to the end of round 22, 2026.

Legend
G	Goals	K	Kicks	D	Disposals	T	Tackles
B	Behinds	H	Handballs	M	Marks

Season	Team	No.	Games	Totals							Averages (per game)							Votes
Season	Team	No.	Games	G	B	K	H	D	M	T	G	B	K	H	D	M	T	Votes
2021	Fremantle	31	10	0	3	72	32	104	36	17	0.0	0.3	7.2	3.2	10.4	3.6	1.7	0
2022	Fremantle	31	21	1	1	186	110	296	67	43	0.0	0.0	8.9	5.2	14.1	3.2	2.0	0
2023	Fremantle	31	14	0	0	93	52	145	41	19	0.0	0.0	6.6	3.7	10.4	2.9	1.4	0
2024	Fremantle	31	19	1	0	167	99	266	71	40	0.1	0.0	8.8	5.2	14.0	3.7	2.1	0
2025	Fremantle	31	2	0	0	9	9	18	1	5	0.0	0.0	4.5	4.5	9.0	0.5	2.5	0
2026	Fremantle	31	1	0	0	5	5	10	0	1	0.0	0.0	5.0	5.0	10.0	0.0	1.0	0
Career			67	2	4	532	307	839	216	125	0.0	0.1	7.9	4.6	12.5	3.2	1.9	0
