= Jeremy Sharp =

Australian football league player

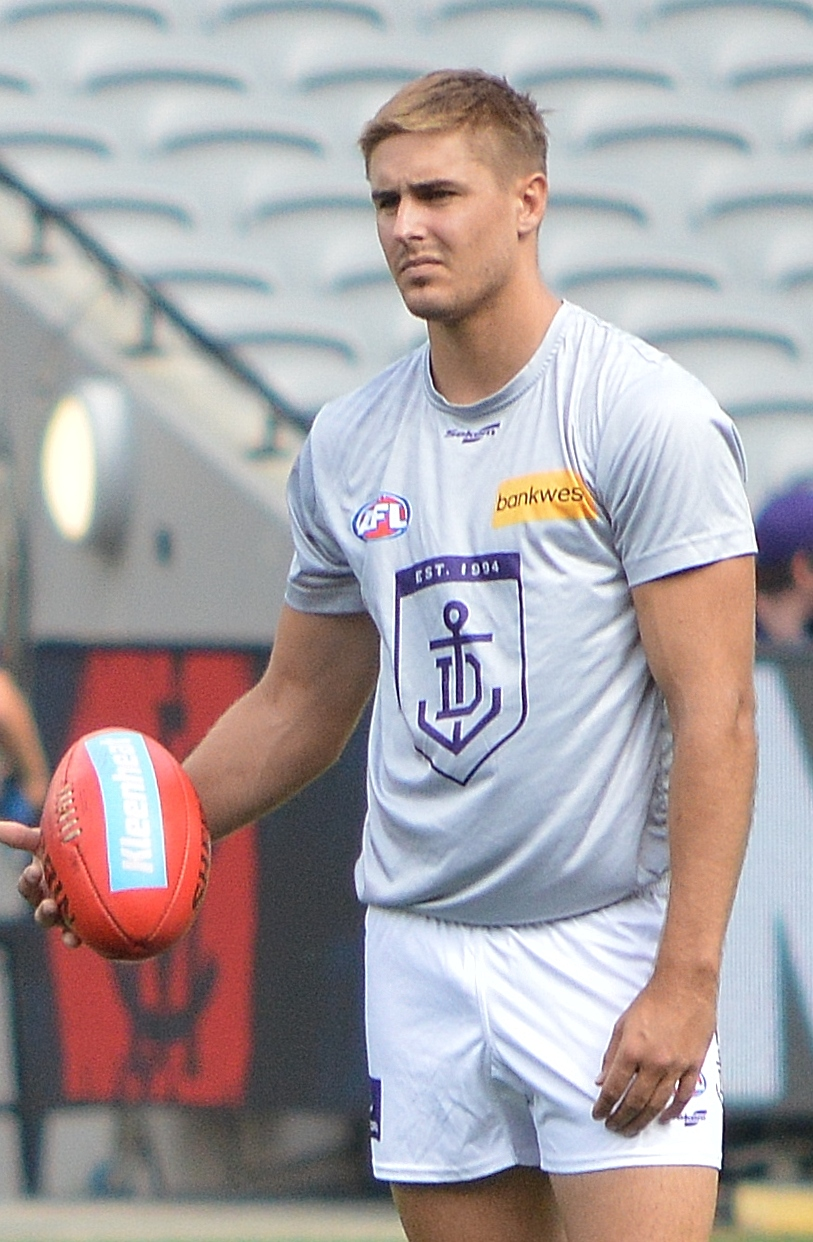
- Sharp in April 2025

Personal information
- Born: 13 August 2002 (age 24); Fremantle, Western Australia
- Original team: East Fremantle
- Draft: No. 27, 2019 AFL draft, Gold Coast
- Debut: 6 August 2020, Gold Coast vs. St Kilda, at Carrara Stadium
- Height: 187 cm (6 ft 2 in)
- Weight: 79 kg (174 lb)
- Position: Midfielder/Wingman

Club information
- Current club: Fremantle
- Number: 14

Playing career^{1}
Years	Club	Games (Goals)
2020–2023	Gold Coast	23 (7)
2024–	Fremantle	39 (15)
Total		62 (22)
- ^{1} Playing statistics correct to the end of round 22, 2026.

Career highlights
- AFL Rising Star nominee: 2021; VFL premiership player: 2023; West Australian Football League premiership player: 2026; Simpson Medal (WAFL Grand Final Best on Ground): 2026

Jeremy Sharp (born 13 August 2001) is an Australian rules footballer who plays for the Fremantle Football Club, having previously played for the Gold Coast Suns in the Australian Football League (AFL). He was recruited by the Gold Coast Suns with the 27th draft pick in the 2019 AFL draft.

== Early life ==
Sharp was born in Western Australia and grew up in the riverside Perth suburb of Attadale. He participated in the Auskick program at Attadale and played his junior football for the Attadale Bombers and attended Aquinas College throughout his upbringing. He also played for East Fremantle in the Western Australian Football League colts division, where he played six games and kicked 3 goals. Sharp represented Western Australia in the AFL Under 18 Championships in the 2018 and 2019 seasons. He was named in the Under 18 All Australian team for 2018 and 2019.

== AFL career ==
Sharp was taken at pick 27 in the 2019 AFL draft, in a live trade with Geelong where Gold Coast swapped their future mid-first round selection and pick 64 for pick 27. It was the second 'live trade' to occur in the AFL.

Sharp debuted in the Suns' four point loss to St Kilda in the 10th round of the 2020 AFL season. On his debut, Sharp picked up 9 disposals and a mark. Sharp was nominated for the 2021 AFL Rising Star award after his performance in round 18 against Western Bulldogs, where he collected 30 disposals and 10 marks in a career-best performance.

Sharp spent the entirety of the 2023 AFL season playing for Gold Coast's reserve team in the Victorian Football League, where he averaged 21.3 disposals from 19 games. He was a part of the club's inaugural VFL grand final win against the Werribee Tigers. Following the 2023 season he was delisted by Gold Coast before joining the Fremantle Football Club, who had shown interest in Sharp the season prior.

Jeremy made his debut for Fremantle in their opening game of the 2024 AFL season against the Brisbane Lions at Optus Stadium, collecting eighteen disposals and eight inside 50's during the 23 point win. He collected thirteen disposals the next week against North Melbourne, and kicked an important goal in the final quarter. Sharp was again impressive in Fremantle's narrow loss to Carlton during the Gather Round, collecting 29 disposals, seven inside 50s and kicking a goal. He finished his first season at the Dockers having played every game.

== Personal life ==
His grandfather, Ken Holt, is a member of the East Fremantle Football Club's Hall of Fame and represented Western Australia at the state level throughout his career.

== Statistics ==
Updated to the end of round 22, 2026.

Legend
G	Goals	K	Kicks	D	Disposals	T	Tackles
B	Behinds	H	Handballs	M	Marks

Season	Team	No.	Games	Totals							Averages (per game)							Votes
Season	Team	No.	Games	G	B	K	H	D	M	T	G	B	K	H	D	M	T	Votes
2020 (Note: The 2020 season was played with 17 home-and-away matches per team (down from 22) and 16-minute quarters with time on (down from 20-minute quarters with time on) due to the impact of the COVID-19 pandemic.)	Gold Coast	37	2	0	0	10	9	19	4	0	0.0	0.0	5.0	4.5	9.5	2.0	0.0	0
2021	Gold Coast	37	9	2	3	113	52	165	53	7	0.2	0.3	12.6	5.8	18.3	5.9	0.8	1
2022	Gold Coast	20	12	5	4	84	33	117	35	10	0.4	0.3	7.0	2.8	9.8	2.9	0.8	0
2023	Gold Coast	20	0	—	—	—	—	—	—	—	—	—	—	—	—	—	—	0
2024	Fremantle	14	23	10	15	287	131	418	130	25	0.4	0.7	12.5	5.7	18.2	5.7	1.1	0
2025	Fremantle	14	14	3	5	98	87	185	40	18	0.2	0.4	7.0	6.2	13.2	2.9	1.3	0
2026	Fremantle	14	2	2	0	15	9	24	12	2	1.0	0.0	7.5	4.5	12.0	6.0	1.0	0
Career			62	22	27	607	321	928	274	62	0.4	0.4	9.8	5.2	15.0	4.4	1.0	1
