= Sean Darcy =

Australian rules footballer (born 1998)

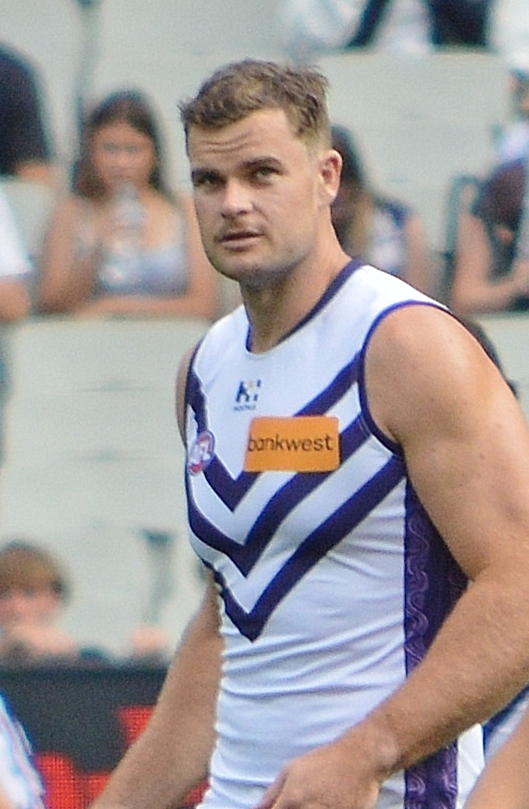
- Darcy in April 2025

Personal information
- Full name: Sean Darcy
- Born: 12 June 1998 (age 28); South Purrembete
- Original team: Geelong Falcons (TAC Cup)/Cobden Football Club/Xavier College
- Draft: No. 38, 2016 national draft
- Height: 203 cm (6 ft 8 in)
- Weight: 110 kg (243 lb)
- Position: Ruck

Club information
- Current club: Fremantle
- Number: 4

Playing career^{1}
Years	Club	Games (Goals)
2017–	Fremantle	134 (51)
- ^{1} Playing statistics correct to the end of round 22, 2026.

Career highlights
- Doig Medal: 2021; 2x 22under22 team: 2018, 2020; Glendinning–Allan Medal: 2022 (round 22); 2x WAFL premiership player: 2017, 2026

Sean Darcy (born 12 June 1998) is a professional Australian rules footballer playing for the Fremantle Football Club in the Australian Football League (AFL). At 203 centimetres (6 ft 8 in) tall and weighing 110 kilograms (240 lb), Darcy competes in the ruck as well as the forward line.

== Early life ==
Originally from South Purrumbete, a farming area near Cobden, Darcy is the youngest of four children and attended Xavier College as a boarder. As a junior, Darcy played for the Cobden Football Club and was also a talented swimmer. In 2016 he played for the Geelong Falcons in the TAC Cup Under 18s competition, his school and for Victoria Country in the 2016 AFL Under 18 Championships. He grew up supporting Geelong and is a nephew of former Geelong and Essendon player Tim Darcy.

== AFL career ==
He was recruited by Fremantle with their second selection, 38th overall, in the 2016 AFL draft. He made his AFL debut in Round 14 of the 2017 AFL season, against Geelong at Simonds Stadium, after playing well for Fremantle's reserves team, Peel Thunder, in the West Australian Football League (WAFL). Darcy amassed 40 hit-outs in his debut game. Due to his physical size and playing style, he is often compared to Shane Mumford.

A breakout performance during the 2021 AFL season saw Darcy win his first Fremantle best and fairest award, the Doig Medal. Darcy played every game in 2021, establishing himself as a premier ruckman. Western Derby 55 saw Darcy amass a derby record 56 hit-outs during Fremantle's 24-point win over the West Coast Eagles. He was awarded the Glendinning–Allan Medal for best on ground.

Darcy started the 2023 AFL season in brilliant form, and as of 21 April led the league for both total hitouts (204) and hitouts to advantage (56). Darcy’s strong form was cut short with a hamstring injury in Round 11 against Melbourne. He made his return in Round 15 during Fremantle's 32-point win over Essendon. He tallied a record 58 hit-outs during Round 17 against Carlton at Optus Stadium. Darcy suffered an ankle injury during Round 18 against Collingwood, which required surgery. He was subsequently ruled out for the rest of the season. Already contracted until 2024, Darcy signed a six-year contract extension in December 2023, tying him to Fremantle until at least 2030.

He was ranked the third best ruckman in the league by Nine's Wide World of Sports in February 2024. Darcy suffered a knee injury in the off-season during Fremantle's practice match against Port Adelaide, and as a result missed the first five games of the 2024 AFL season. Sean made his return during Western Derby 58 collecting 13 disposals and 30 hitouts. He played his hundredth game the next week against the Western Bulldogs. He kicked two goals both courtesy of 50-metre penalties and collected 12 hit-outs against Richmond in round eight at the MCG, before being substituted out of the game in the third quarter with a tight calf. As a result he missed Fremantle's next two games before returning in round eleven against Collingwood. He was ranked the most efficient ruckmen for hitouts to advantage in the competition as of July, with a return of 15.35%.

== Statistics ==
Updated to the end of round 22, 2026.

Legend
G	Goals	K	Kicks	D	Disposals	T	Tackles
B	Behinds	H	Handballs	M	Marks	H/O	Hit-outs

Season	Team	No.	Games	Totals								Averages (per game)								Votes
Season	Team	No.	Games	G	B	K	H	D	M	T	H/O	G	B	K	H	D	M	T	H/O	Votes
2017	Fremantle	4	8	1	2	36	62	98	12	36	272	0.1	0.3	4.5	7.8	12.3	1.5	4.5	34.0	0
2018	Fremantle	4	7	2	3	20	45	65	15	29	233	0.3	0.4	2.9	6.4	9.3	2.1	4.1	33.3	0
2019	Fremantle	4	11	4	7	44	78	122	20	30	300	0.4	0.6	4.0	7.1	11.1	1.8	2.7	27.3	0
2020 (Note: The 2020 season was played with 17 home-and-away matches per team (down from 22) and 16-minute quarters with time on (down from 20-minute quarters with time on) due to the impact of the COVID-19 pandemic.)	Fremantle	4	15	5	6	42	92	134	24	25	330	0.3	0.4	2.8	6.1	8.9	1.6	1.7	22.0	0
2021	Fremantle	4	21	12	12	156	193	349	90	64	599	0.6	0.6	7.4	9.2	16.6	4.3	3.0	28.5	7
2022	Fremantle	4	21	10	9	147	150	297	51	55	712	0.5	0.4	7.0	7.1	14.1	2.4	2.6	33.9	6
2023	Fremantle	4	15	4	6	95	112	207	51	48	587	0.3	0.4	6.3	7.5	13.8	3.4	3.2	39.1	2
2024	Fremantle	4	12	6	2	63	86	149	19	36	374	0.5	0.2	5.3	7.2	12.4	1.6	3.0	31.2	0
2025	Fremantle	4	17	5	2	83	84	167	25	52	449	0.3	0.1	4.9	4.9	9.8	1.5	3.1	26.4	0
2026	Fremantle	4	7	2	1	19	31	50	7	12	128	0.3	0.1	2.7	4.4	7.1	1.0	1.7	18.3	0
Career			134	51	50	705	933	1638	314	387	3984	0.4	0.4	5.3	7.0	12.2	2.3	2.9	29.7	15

== Honours and achievements ==
Team

- AFL minor premiership: 2026 (Fremantle)
- 2x WAFL premiership: 2017, 2026 (Peel Thunder)

Individual

- Doig Medal: 2021
- Glendinning–Allan Medal: 2022 (round 22)
- 2× 22under22 team: 2018, 2020
