= Jaeger O'Meara =

Australian rules footballer (born 1994)

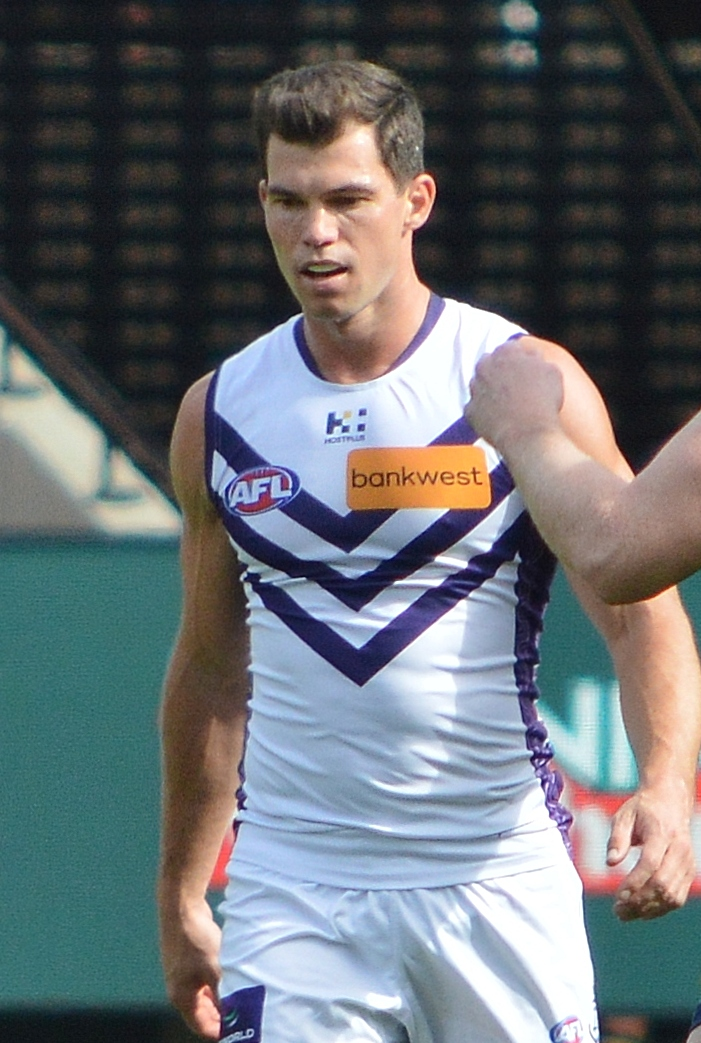
- O'Meara playing for Fremantle in 2025

Personal information
- Full name: Jaeger O'Meara
- Born: 23 February 1994 (age 32); Perth, Western Australia
- Original team: Perth (WAFL)
- Draft: No. 1, 2011 mini-draft
- Debut: Round 1, 2013, Gold Coast vs. St Kilda, at Metricon Stadium
- Height: 184 cm (6 ft 0 in)
- Weight: 83 kg (183 lb)
- Position: Midfielder

Club information
- Current club: Fremantle
- Number: 2

Playing career^{1}
Years	Club	Games (Goals)
2013–2016	Gold Coast	44 (27)
2017–2022	Hawthorn	99 (43)
2023–	Fremantle	63 (17)
Total		206 (87)

Representative team honours
Years	Team	Games (Goals)
2026	Western Australia	1 (0)
- ^{1} Playing statistics correct to the end of round 22, 2026.

Career highlights
- 22under22 team: 2013; Ron Evans Medal: 2013; AFLPA best first-year player: 2013; AFLCA best young player of the year: 2014; West Australian Football League premiership player: 2026

Jaeger O'Meara (born 23 February 1994) is a professional Australian rules footballer playing for the Fremantle Football Club in the Australian Football League (AFL). He previously played for the Gold Coast Suns from 2013 to 2016, and the Hawthorn Football Club from 2017 to 2022. O'Meara won the AFL Rising Star award in his first season in 2013.

== Early life ==
O'Meara was born in Perth, Western Australia to parents Non and Wayne. His parents moved to Dongara where his grandparents had a hotel and played junior football with the Dongara Eagles.

He studied at Nagle Catholic College in Geraldton. O'Meara began playing senior football for Railways Football Club in the Great Northern Football League. He competed for the Railways senior team in their 2010 GNFL Grand Final win and lined up on future Gold Coast Suns teammate Jack Martin. He was awarded the Guardian Medal for his best on ground performance at 16 years of age. O'Meara was then recruited by the Perth Football Club for the 2011 WAFL season and made his senior debut in August.

== AFL career ==
=== Gold Coast (2012–2016) ===
O'Meara was recruited by Gold Coast with the first selection in the 2011 mini draft, a special draft of players who were too young to be eligible for selection in the main 2011 AFL draft. Gold Coast obtained the first selection in the mini draft by trading their first selection, the fourth overall, to the new Greater Western Sydney team.

As part of the mini-draft rules, O'Meara was unable to play for the Gold Coast Suns in the 2012 season, but did play for them in the 2012 NAB Cup preseason competition and then with the reserve team in the North East Australian Football League. He underwent groin surgery that prevented him from playing for the rest of the season.

O'Meara made his debut in the opening round of the 2013 AFL season and was rewarded with the round 5 nomination for the 2013 AFL Rising Star after recording 25 disposals, five marks, four tackles and two goals in the forty-four point win against Greater Western Sydney. He re-signed with the Suns for a further two seasons midway during the year. After playing every game for the Suns during his debut season, he was subsequently named the NAB AFL Rising Star for 2013. Since making his debut in 2013, O'Meara did not miss a game in 2013 and 2014, playing all possible 44 games during that period.

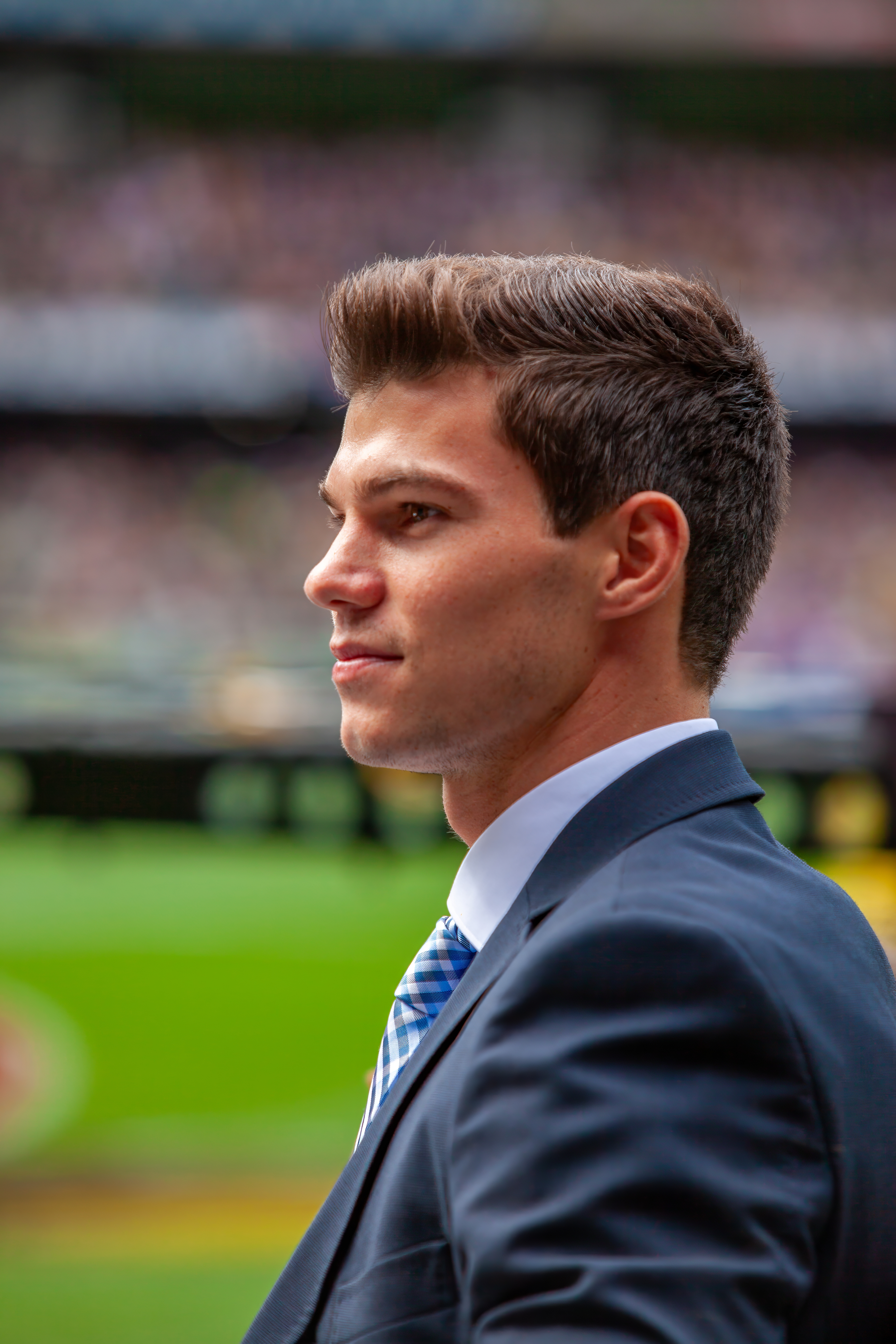
Jaeger O'Meara in the 2013 Grand Final Motorcade after winning the 2013 Ron Evans Medal NAB Rising Star Award.

He had an unfortunate start to the 2015 season, as he injured his knee in a NEAFL scratch match that required extensive surgery. More surgery was required for his patella tendon that eventually resulted in him missing the entire 2015 and 2016 seasons through injury.

=== Hawthorn (2017–2022) ===
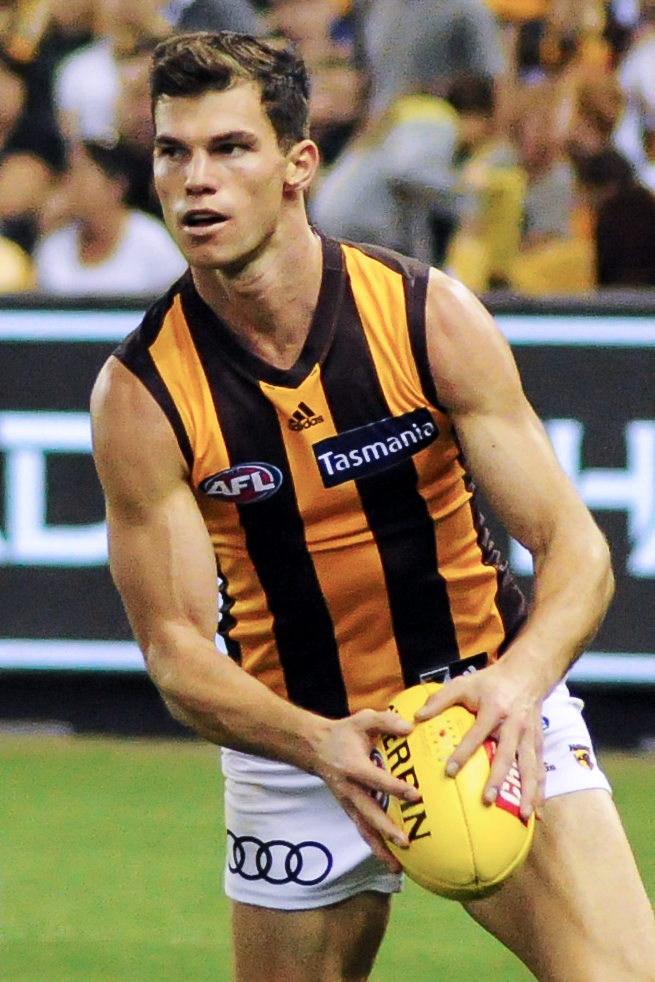
O'Meara playing for Hawthorn in 2018

O'Meara requested a trade from Gold Coast in August 2016. In September, he nominated Hawthorn as his preferred destination. He was officially traded to Hawthorn in October. O'Meara had an injury-plagued first season at Hawthorn, managing only six games due to ongoing knee problems. O'Meara's knee improved considerably by 2018, and he became a standard fixture in Hawthorn's midfield for that season and 2019. Due to Tom Mitchell's injury preventing him from participating in the latter season, O'Meara was widely seen as Hawthorn's most effective midfielder.

O'Meara was named as one of Hawthorn's two Vice-Captains prior to the 2020 season, along with Mitchell. O'Meara broke his hand in Round 12 of the season, causing him to miss four games.

=== Fremantle (2023–present) ===
Despite being contracted to Hawthorn for a further year, O'Meara attracted interest from multiple clubs during the 2022 trade period, with interest from GWS and Fremantle, who were seeking a senior player to add to their lists. O'Meara was eventually traded to Fremantle, allowing him to return to his home state with a four-year contract.

Upon joining Fremantle, O’Meara was promoted to the club's leadership group. O’Meara played his first game for Fremantle in the opening round of the 2023 AFL season against St Kilda, collecting 19 disposals and 13 handballs during the match. He kicked two goals and collected 21 disposals the next week, against North Melbourne at Optus Stadium. O'Meara finished his first season at the Dockers having played 21 games. Although traditionally a midfielder, he has played in a variety of positions since joining Fremantle, including as a wingman and at half-back.

== Personal life ==
O'Meara became engaged to Tory Packer in December 2022. They married in December 2023.

== Statistics ==
Updated to the end of round 22, 2026.

Legend
G	Goals	K	Kicks	D	Disposals	T	Tackles
B	Behinds	H	Handballs	M	Marks

Season	Team	No.	Games	Totals							Averages (per game)							Votes
Season	Team	No.	Games	G	B	K	H	D	M	T	G	B	K	H	D	M	T	Votes
2013	Gold Coast	1	22	16	11	231	245	476	97	111	0.7	0.5	10.5	11.1	21.6	4.4	5.0	4
2014	Gold Coast	1	22	11	7	268	204	472	77	142	0.5	0.3	12.2	9.3	21.5	3.5	6.5	1
2015	Gold Coast	1	0	—	—	—	—	—	—	—	—	—	—	—	—	—	—	0
2016	Gold Coast	1	0	—	—	—	—	—	—	—	—	—	—	—	—	—	—	0
2017	Hawthorn	10	6	1	4	41	88	129	12	24	0.2	0.7	6.8	14.7	21.5	2.0	4.0	1
2018	Hawthorn	10	21	16	8	266	238	504	79	114	0.8	0.4	12.7	11.3	24.0	3.8	5.4	13
2019	Hawthorn	10	21	8	11	327	214	541	76	123	0.4	0.5	15.6	10.2	25.8	3.6	5.9	11
2020 (Note: The 2020 season was played with 17 home-and-away matches per team (down from 22) and 16-minute quarters with time on (down from 20-minute quarters with time on) due to the impact of the COVID-19 pandemic.)	Hawthorn	10	12	4	4	140	110	250	35	52	0.3	0.3	11.7	9.2	20.8	2.9	4.3	3
2021	Hawthorn	10	18	5	9	232	241	473	74	91	0.3	0.5	12.9	13.4	26.3	4.1	5.1	11
2022	Hawthorn	10	21	9	9	230	197	427	74	105	0.4	0.4	11.0	9.4	20.3	3.5	5.0	2
2023	Fremantle	2	21	7	3	186	225	411	55	102	0.3	0.1	8.9	10.7	19.6	2.6	4.9	1
2024	Fremantle	2	22	8	8	183	154	337	79	63	0.4	0.4	8.3	7.0	15.3	3.6	2.9	0
2025	Fremantle	2	14	2	2	106	137	243	36	49	0.1	0.1	7.6	9.8	17.4	2.6	3.5	1
2026	Fremantle	2	6	0	2	45	49	94	17	17	0.0	0.3	7.5	8.2	15.7	2.8	2.8	0
Career			206	87	78	2255	2102	4357	711	993	0.4	0.4	10.9	10.2	21.2	3.5	4.8	48

== Honours and achievements ==
Team

- AFL minor premiership: 2026 (Fremantle)
- WAFL premiership player: 2026 (Peel Thunder)

Individual

- Ron Evans Medal: 2013
- AFLPA best first year player: 2013
- AFLCA best young player of the year: 2014
- 22under22 team: 2013
- Under 18 All-Australian team: 2011
