= Heath Chapman =

Australian rules footballer

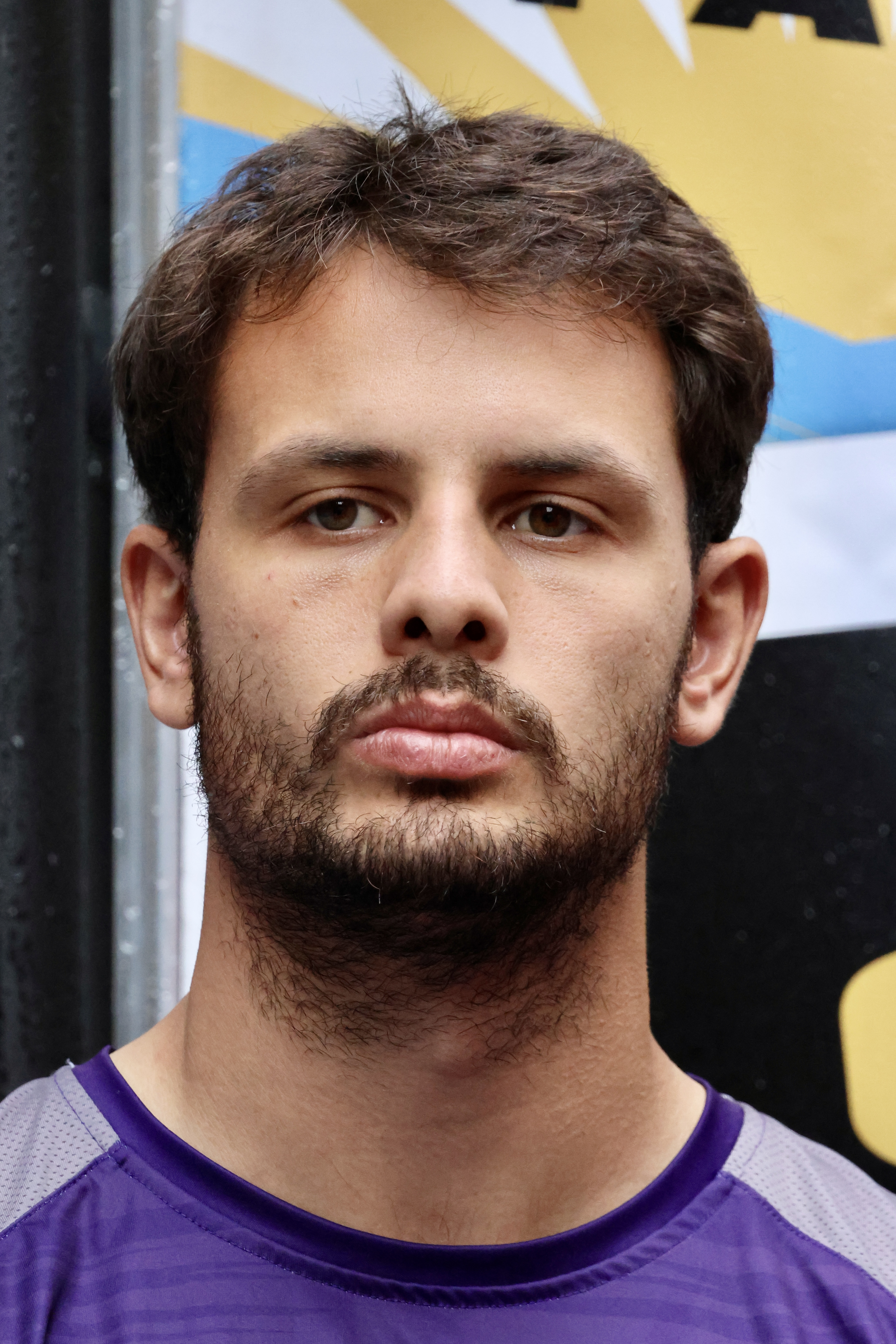
- Champan at the 2026 Gather Round

Personal information
- Full name: Heath Chapman
- Nickname: Chappy
- Born: 31 January 2002 (age 24)
- Original team: West Perth (WAFL)
- Draft: No. 14, 2020 national draft
- Height: 193 cm (6 ft 4 in)
- Weight: 81 kg (179 lb)
- Position: Key Defender

Club information
- Current club: Fremantle
- Number: 5

Playing career^{1}
Years	Club	Games (Goals)
2021–	Fremantle	89 (3)
- ^{1} Playing statistics correct to the end of semi final, 2026.

Career highlights
- Rising Star Nomination: 2022

Heath Chapman (born 31 January 2002) is an Australian rules football player who plays for the Fremantle Dockers in the Australian Football League (AFL).

== Early career ==
Chapman played junior football for the Joondalup Kinross Junior Football Club and attended Prendiville Catholic College. He played for West Perth in the West Australian Football League where he captained the colts side and won their best and fairest award. Known for his intercept marking skills and speed, Chapman ran the fastest 2 km time trial at the 2020 WA draft combine testing.

== AFL career ==
Chapman was drafted by Fremantle with their first pick, the fourteenth overall, in the 2020 AFL draft. He made his AFL debut in the second round of the 2021 AFL season in Fremantle's win over Greater Western Sydney. Round one of the 2022 AFL season versus Adelaide saw Chapman receive much praise for his 'game-winning Intercept play' in which he spoiled an opponent's kick on the goal line conceding no score with just seven seconds left in the match. With just a point the difference had the ball been rushed through for a behind the game would have been a draw. Chapman received a 2022 AFL Rising Star nomination for his performance in round 8 against North Melbourne at Optus Stadium, collecting 25 disposals, 12 intercept possession and five marks. Chapman finished the home-and-away season having played fifteen games, and featured in both of Fremantle's finals appearances.

Chapman played in Fremantle's first three game of the 2023 AFL season, but an injury sustained during the first Western Derby saw him ruled out for the rest of the year. Heath returned to the Fremantle line-up in round seven of the 2024 AFL season against the Western Bulldogs.

== Statistics ==
Updated to the end of round 22, 2026.

Legend
G	Goals	K	Kicks	D	Disposals	T	Tackles
B	Behinds	H	Handballs	M	Marks

Season	Team	No.	Games	Totals							Averages (per game)							Votes
Season	Team	No.	Games	G	B	K	H	D	M	T	G	B	K	H	D	M	T	Votes
2021	Fremantle	27	6	1	0	50	35	85	27	10	0.2	0.0	8.3	5.8	14.2	4.5	1.7	0
2022	Fremantle	27	17	0	0	180	136	316	105	29	0.0	0.0	10.6	8.0	18.6	6.2	1.7	0
2023	Fremantle	27	3	0	0	23	22	45	15	6	0.0	0.0	7.7	7.3	15.0	5.0	2.0	0
2024	Fremantle	5	16	1	0	154	104	258	93	29	0.1	0.0	9.6	6.5	16.1	5.8	1.8	0
2025	Fremantle	5	23	0	0	191	104	295	100	50	0.0	0.0	8.3	4.5	12.8	4.3	2.2	0
2026	Fremantle	5	21	1	2	190	125	315	110	43	0.0	0.1	9.0	6.0	15.0	5.2	2.0	0
Career			86	3	2	788	526	1314	450	167	0.0	0.0	9.2	6.1	15.3	5.2	1.9	0
