= 2024 WAFL season =

140th season of the West Australian Football League

- Teams: 10
- Premiers: Peel Thunder; 3rd premiership
- Minor premiers: East Perth; 22nd minor premiership
- Sandover Medallist: Nik Rokahir (Swan Districts) & Callan England (Claremont – ?? votes each)
- Bernie Naylor Medallist: Tyler Keitel (West Perth – 56 goals)

The 2024 WAFL season was the 140th season of the various incarnations of the West Australian Football League (WAFL). The season commenced on the 28th of March 2024. Peel Thunder won their third premiership, beating the minor premiers East Perth in the Grand Final.

Nik Rokahir (Swan Districts) and Callan England (Claremont) tied for the Sandover Medal this year on 19 votes each, the first time a Sandover Medal was tied since 2005.

== Home-and-away season ==
=== Round 1 ===
	Round 1
Thursday 28 March (7:10 pm)	West Perth 11.9 (75)	def.	Claremont 11.7 (73)	Pentanet Stadium (crowd: 4,350)
Saturday 30 March (1:40 pm)	Peel Thunder 12.10 (82)	def.	East Fremantle 9.9 (63)	Lane Group Stadium (crowd: 2,367)
Saturday 30 March (2:30 pm)	South Fremantle 6.7 (43)	def. by	East Perth 12.10 (82)	Fremantle Oval (crowd: 2,728)
Saturday 30 March (2:30 pm)	Swan Districts 21.11 (137)	def.	West Coast 10.13 (73)	Steel Blue Oval (crowd: 3,039)
Saturday 30 March (4:10 pm)	Perth 10.10 (70)	def.	Subiaco 8.8 (56)	Mineral Resources Park (crowd: 2,398)

=== Round 2 ===
	Round 2
Saturday 6 April (11:10 am)	West Coast 8.7 (55)	def. by	South Fremantle 22.11 (143)	Mineral Resources Park (crowd: 662)
Saturday 6 April (2:30 pm)	Claremont 6.9 (45)	def. by	East Fremantle 21.9 (135)	Revo Fitness Stadium (crowd: 1,477)
Saturday 6 April (2:30 pm)	East Perth 18.11 (119)	def.	Swan Districts 11.16 (82)	Sullivan Logistics Stadium (crowd: 2,562)
Saturday 6 April (4:00 pm)	West Perth 17.14 (116)	def.	Perth 9.14 (68)	Pentanet Stadium (crowd: 2,476)
Sunday 7 April (2:10 pm)	Subiaco 14.8 (92)	def.	Peel Thunder 9.12 (66)	Sullivan Logistics Stadium (crowd: 1,791)

=== Round 3 ===
	Round 3
Saturday 13 April (1:40 pm)	Peel Thunder 10.9 (69)	def.	East Perth 8.5 (53)	Lane Group Stadium (crowd: 1,772)
Saturday 13 April (2:10 pm)	South Fremantle 10.10 (70)	def.	Claremont 9.15 (69)	Fremantle Oval (crowd: 2,190)
Saturday 13 April (2:10 pm)	Subiaco 10.9 (69)	def.	West Perth 8.17 (65)	Sullivan Logistics Stadium (crowd: 1,678)
Saturday 13 April (4:10 pm)	Perth 9.12 (66)	def.	Swan Districts 9.9 (63)	Mineral Resources Park (crowd: 2,542)
Sunday 14 April (10:00 am)	West Coast 13.17 (95)	def.	East Fremantle 14.7 (91)	Mineral Resources Park (crowd: 496)

=== Round 4 ===
	Round 4
Saturday 20 April (2:00 pm)	West Coast 7.13 (55)	def. by	Peel Thunder 18.15 (123)	Optus Stadium (crowd: TBC)
Saturday 20 April (2:10 pm)	Claremont 11.12 (78)	def.	Subiaco 8.9 (57)	Mineral Resources Park (crowd: 1,463)
	Bye: West Perth; East Perth; South Fremantle Perth; Swan Districts; East Fremantle

=== Round 5 ===
	Round 5
Thursday 25 April (4:10 pm)	Perth 10.10 (70)	def. by	East Perth 13.13 (91)	Mineral Resources Park (crowd: 3,831)
Saturday 27 April (2:10 pm)	West Perth 7.11 (53)	def. by	South Fremantle 10.11 (71)	Pentanet Stadium (crowd: 1,778)
Sunday 28 April (2:30 pm)	Swan Districts 11.8 (74)	def. by	East Fremantle 11.10 (76)	Steel Blue Oval (crowd: 2,760)
	Bye: West Coast; Peel Thunder Subiaco; Claremont

=== Round 6 ===
	Round 6
Saturday 4 May (2:10 pm)	Subiaco 7.10 (52)	def. by	East Fremantle 17.7 (109)	Sullivan Logistics Stadium (crowd: 1,287)
Saturday 4 May (2:10 pm)	Peel Thunder 25.14 (164)	def.	West Perth 7.9 (51)	Lane Group Stadium (crowd: 1,612)
Saturday 4 May (2:30 pm)	Claremont 6.10 (46)	def. by	Swan Districts 9.9 (63)	Revo Fitness Stadium (crowd: 1,610)
Saturday 4 May (2:30 pm)	South Fremantle 10.14 (74)	def.	Perth 4.13 (37)	Fremantle Oval (crowd: 1,847)
Sunday 5 May (11:10 am)	East Perth 18.7 (115)	def.	West Coast 6.5 (41)	Sullivan Logistics Stadium (crowd: 1,150)

=== Round 7 ===
	Round 7
Saturday 11 May (2:10 pm)	Swan Districts 9.15 (69)	def. by	Peel Thunder 14.4 (88)	Steel Blue Oval (crowd: 1,428)
Saturday 11 May (2:30 pm)	Perth 6.10 (46)	def. by	Claremont 15.13 (103)	Mineral Resources Park (crowd: 1,523)
Saturday 11 May (2:30 pm)	Subiaco 10.12 (72)	def. by	South Fremantle 12.7 (79)	Sullivan Logistics Stadium (crowd: 1,322)
Saturday 11 May (2:40 pm)	East Fremantle 9.9 (63)	def. by	East Perth 10.6 (66)	Fremantle Oval (crowd: 1,722)
Saturday 11 May (3:00 pm)	West Perth 24.12 (156)	def.	West Coast 10.4 (64)	Pentanet Stadium (crowd: 1,387)

=== Round 8 ===
	Round 8
Saturday 25 May (10:00 am)	West Coast 13.10 (88)	def.	Claremont 9.13 (67)	Mineral Resources Park (crowd: TBC)
Saturday 25 May (2:10 pm)	East Perth 17.11 (83)	def.	Subiaco 8.11 (59)	Sullivan Logistics Stadium (crowd: 2,478)
Saturday 25 May (2:00 pm)	Peel Thunder 12.14 (86)	def.	South Fremantle 6.6 (42)	Lane Group Stadium (crowd: 1,611)
Saturday 25 May (2:10 pm)	East Fremantle 11.11 (77)	def.	Perth 10.13 (73)	Revo Fitness Stadium (crowd: 1,068)
Saturday 25 May (2:30 pm)	Swan Districts 13.9 (87)	def.	West Perth 10.14 (74)	Steel Blue Oval (crowd: 2,192)

=== Round 9 ===
	Round 9
Saturday 1 June (2:30 pm)	Claremont 10.12 (72)	def.	Peel Thunder 5.13 (43)	Revo Fitness Stadium (crowd: 1,161)
Saturday 1 June (2:30 pm)	Subiaco 7.12 (54)	def. by	Swan Districts 9.11 (65)	Sullivan Logistics Stadium (crowd: 1,483)
Sunday 2 June (11:10 am)	Perth 10.9 (69)	def. by	West Coast 10.11 (71)	Henry Street Oval, Northam (crowd: TBC)
Monday 3 June (1:10 pm)	South Fremantle 13.9 (87)	def.	East Fremantle 10.13 (73)	Fremantle Oval (crowd: 7,468)
Monday 3 June (2:30 pm)	West Perth 11.17 (83)	def. by	East Perth 13.8 (86)	Pentanet Stadium (crowd: TBC)

=== Round 10 ===
	Round 10
Saturday 8 June (10:00 am)	Subiaco 16.16 (112)	def.	West Coast 6.11 (47)	Sullivan Logistics Stadium (crowd: 832)
Sunday 9 June (2:10 pm)	East Perth 6.14 (50)	def. by	Claremont 9.5 (59)	Sullivan Logistics Stadium (crowd: 1,612)
Sunday 9 June (2:30 pm)	East Fremantle 12.10 (82)	def.	West Perth 5.10 (40)	Fremantle Oval (crowd: 1,067)
	Bye: Swan Districts; Peel Thunder Perth; South Fremantle

=== Round 11 ===
	Round 11
Saturday 15 June (1:10 pm)	Peel Thunder 12.12 (84)	def.	Perth 5.10 (40)	Lane Group Stadium (crowd: 1,015)
Saturday 15 June (2:30 pm)	Swan Districts 10.12 (72)	def.	South Fremantle 6.9 (45)	Steel Blue Oval (crowd: 4,555)
Sunday 16 June (2:30 pm)	East Fremantle 17.14 (116)	def.	Subiaco 4.6 (30)	Revo Fitness Stadium (crowd: 1,023)
	Bye: West Coast; West Perth East Perth; Claremont

=== Round 12 ===
	Round 12
Saturday 22 June (1:10 pm)	South Fremantle 13.11 (89)	def.	West Coast 5.6 (36)	Fremantle Oval1,261
Saturday 22 June (2:10 pm)	Swan Districts 12.7 (79)	def.	East Perth 11.12 (78)	Steel Blue Oval (crowd: 2,143)
Saturday 22 June (2:30 pm)	Claremont 8.13 (61)	def.	Perth 6.6 (42)	Revo Fitness Stadium (crowd: 1,424)
Saturday 22 June (2:30 pm)	West Perth 11.10 (76)	def. by	Peel Thunder 12.8 (80)	Pentanet Stadium (crowd: 1,421)
	Bye: East Fremantle Subiaco

=== Round 13 ===
	Round 13
Saturday 29 June (2:30 pm)	Peel Thunder 9.6 (60)	def. by	Subiaco 9.12 (66)	Lane Group Stadium (crowd: 1,001)
Saturday 29 June (2:30 pm)	Perth 16.4 (100)	def.	West Perth 11.7 (73)	Mineral Resources Park (crowd: 1,620)
Saturday 29 June (2:40 pm)	East Perth 10.8 (68)	def.	South Fremantle 10.5 (65)	Sullivan Logistics Stadium (crowd: TBC)
Sunday 30 June (1:10 pm)	Swan Districts 16.8 (104)	def.	West Coast 12.8 (80)	Steel Blue Oval (crowd: 1,664)
Sunday 30 June (2:30 pm)	East Fremantle 8.5 (53)	def. by	Claremont 9.8 (62)	Sullivan Logistics Stadium (crowd: 1,008)

=== Round 14 ===
	Round 14
Saturday 6 July (12:30 pm)	Peel Thunder 18.8 (116)	def.	West Coast 6.6 (42)	Lane Group Stadium (crowd: 1,182)
Saturday 6 July (2:10 pm)	Claremont 10.8 (68)	def.	South Fremantle 8.9 (57)	Revo Fitness Stadium (crowd: 1,126)
Saturday 6 July (2:30 pm)	Subiaco 11.9 (75)	def. by	East Perth 11.12 (78)	Sullivan Logistics Stadium (crowd: 1,274)
Saturday 6 July (2:30 pm)	Perth 7.9 (51)	def. by	East Fremantle 9.11 (65)	Mineral Resources Park (crowd: TBC)
Saturday 6 July (2:30 pm)	West Perth 11.13 (79)	def. by	Swan Districts 21.16 (142)	Pentanet Stadium (crowd: TBC)
Perth renamed themselves Boorloo as it was the Indigenous round.

=== Round 15 ===
	Round 15
Saturday 13 July (11:10 am)	West Coast 17.12 (114)	def.	West Perth 16.10 (106)	Mineral Resources Park (crowd: TBC)
Saturday 13 July (2:30 pm)	East Fremantle 13.11 (89)	def.	Peel Thunder 10.6 (66)	Lane Group Stadium (crowd: 985)
Saturday 13 June (2:40 pm)	Swan Districts 12.10 (82)	def.	Claremont 10.15 (75)	Steel Blue Oval (crowd: 2,531)
	Bye: South Fremantle; Subiaco Perth; East Perth
Perth renamed themselves Boorloo as it was the Indigenous round.

=== Round 16 ===
	Round 16
Saturday 20 July (2:30 pm)	East Perth 11.15 (81)	def.	Perth 11.8 (74)	Sullivan Logistics Stadium (crowd: TBC)
Saturday 20 July (2:30 pm)	West Perth 9.6 (60)	def. by	East Fremantle 11.10 (76)	Pentanet Stadium (crowd: TBC)
Saturday 20 July (4:10 pm)	South Fremantle 17.10 (112)	def.	Subiaco 10.8 (68)	Fremantle Oval (crowd: 1,972)
	Bye: Peel Thunder; Claremont Swan Districts; West Coast

=== Round 17 ===
	Round 17
Saturday 27 July (1:00 pm)	Subiaco 16.11 (107)	def.	West Coast 13.10 (88)	Sullivan Logistics Stadium (crowd: 583)
Saturday 27 July (2:10 pm)	South Fremantle 8.12 (60)	drew with	Swan Districts 8.12 (60)	Fremantle Oval (crowd: 1,746)
Saturday 27 July (2:30 pm)	Claremont 13.9 (87)	def.	East Perth 3.9 (27)	Revo Fitness Stadium (crowd: 1,428)
Saturday 27 July (2:30 pm)	East Perth 10.7 (67)	def. by	Peel Thunder 13.8 (86)	Mineral Resources Park (crowd: TBC)
	Bye: West Perth East Fremantle
This was the first-ever drawn game between South Fremantle and Swan Districts.

=== Round 18 ===
	Round 18
Saturday 3 August (11:10 am)	Perth 13.16 (94)	def.	West Coast 6.10 (46)	Mineral Resources Park (crowd: TBC)
Saturday 3 August (2:10 pm)	East Perth 10.7 (67)	def.	West Perth 6.13 (49)	Sullivan Logistics Stadium (crowd: 2,369)
Saturday 3 August (2:30 pm)	Peel Thunder 17.10 (112)	def.	Claremont 11.11 (77)	Lane Group Stadium (crowd: 1,016)
Saturday 3 August (2:30 pm)	Swan Districts 13.10 (88)	def.	Subiaco 10.8 (68)	Steel Blue Oval (crowd: 2,295)
Saturday 3 August (2:30 pm)	East Fremantle 17.16 (118)	def.	South Fremantle 7.10 (52)	Fremantle Oval (crowd: 3,459)

=== Round 19 ===
	Round 19
Saturday 10 August (11:10 am)	West Coast 7.9 (51)	def. by	East Perth 17.16 (118)	Mineral Resources Park (crowd: TBC)
Saturday 10 August (2:30 pm)	Subiaco 16.4 (100)	def.	Perth 8.8 (56)	Sullivan Logistics Stadium (crowd: 1,110)
Saturday 10 August (2:30 pm)	Claremont 11.17 (83)	def.	West Perth 6.17 (53)	Revo Fitness Stadium (crowd: 1,332)
Saturday 10 August (2:30 pm)	South Fremantle 9.7 (61)	def. by	Peel Thunder 10.11 (71)	Fremantle Oval (crowd: 1,430)
Saturday 10 August (2:30 pm)	East Fremantle 15.10 (100)	def.	Swan Districts 9.10 (64)	Pentanet Stadium (crowd: 872)

=== Round 20 ===
	Round 20
Saturday 17 August (2:30 pm)	Peel Thunder 7.12 (54)	def.	Swan Districts 3.5 (23)	Lane Group Stadium (crowd: 729)
Saturday 17 August (2:30 pm)	East Perth 4.9 (33)	def.	East Fremantle 3.12 (30)	Sullivan Logistics Stadium (crowd: 1,467)
Saturday 17 August (2:30 pm)	Perth 6.2 (38)	def. by	South Fremantle 7.1 (43)	Mineral Resources Park (crowd: 1,273)
Saturday 17 August (2:30 pm)	Claremont 12.7 (79)	def.	West Coast 3.3 (21)	Revo Fitness Stadium (crowd: 729)
Saturday 17 August (2:40 pm)	West Perth 8.10 (58)	def.	West Perth 5.12 (42)	Pentanet Stadium (crowd: TBC)

=== Round 21 ===
	Round 21
Saturday 24 August (3:00 pm)	East Fremantle 12.17 (89)	def.	West Coast 4.5 (29)	East Fremantle Oval (crowd: 502)
Saturday 24 August (4:30 pm)	Swan Districts 10.14 (74)	def.	Perth 2.7 (19)	Steel Blue Oval (crowd: 2,045)
Saturday 24 August (4:30 pm)	South Fremantle 12.9 (81)	def.	West Perth 9.9 (63)	Fremantle Oval (crowd: 1,508)
Saturday 24 August (4:40 pm)	East Perth 6.13 (49)	def.	Peel Thunder 4.5 (29)	Sullivan Logistics Stadium (crowd: 1,194)
Sunday 25 August (2:30 pm)	Subiaco 7.9 (51)	def. by	Claremont 14.16 (100)	Sullivan Logistics Stadium (crowd: 1,012)

== Finals series ==
=== Finals week 1 ===
	Qualifying and elimination finals
Saturday 31 August (2:30 pm)	Peel Thunder 7.6 (48)	def. by	Swan Districts 10.5 (65)	Lane Group Stadium (crowd: 2,759)	Match report
Sunday 1 September (2:10 pm)	East Fremantle 7.13 (55)	def. by	Claremont 12.7 (79)	Revo Fitness Stadium (crowd: 3,551)	Match report
East Perth had a bye for the week as they won the minor premiership and would face the winner of Peel Thunder V Swan Districts.

=== Finals week 2 ===
	Semi finals
Saturday 7 September (2:30 pm)	East Perth 11.6 (72)	def.	Swan Districts 6.8 (44)	Sullivan Logistics Stadium (crowd: 5,223)	Match report
Sunday 8 September (2:10 pm)	Peel Thunder 7.7 (49)	def.	Claremont 6.12 (48)	Lane Group Stadium (crowd: 2,414)	Match report

=== Finals week 3 ===
	Preliminary final
Sunday 15 September (2:10 pm)	Swan Districts 9.2 (56)	def. by	Peel Thunder 15.13 (103)	Steel Blue Reserve (crowd: 7,192)	Match report

=== Finals week 4 ===
2024 WAFL Grand Final
Sunday 22 September (3:10 pm)	East Perth	def. by	Peel Thunder	Optus Stadium, Perth (crowd: 25,481)
2.2 (14); 3.4 (22); 6.6 (42); 8.11 (59)	Q1; Q2; Q3; Final	1.3 (9); 5.7 (37); 10.8 (68); 14.8 (92)	Simpson Medal: Neil Erasmus; Television broadcast: Seven Network
Van Diemen 3, Macreadie 2, Medhat, Sturrock, Brayshaw	Goals	Wilson 2, Bell 2, Simpson 2, Erasmus 2, Voss 2, O'Driscoll, Tregenza, Taberner, Tuia
Wright, Crowden, Jones, Tedesco, Van Diemen, Schumacher, Brayshaw	Best	Erasmus, O'Driscoll, Sellwood, Tuia, Hughes, Bell, Worner, Brodie
Nil	Injuries	Nil
Nil	Reports	Nil

== Ladder ==
Updated to the end of the season

Pos	Team	Pld	W	L	D	PF	PA	PP	Pts	Qualification
1	East Perth	18	14	4	0	1345	1108	121.4	56	Finals series
2	Peel Thunder (P)	18	13	5	0	1479	1087	136.1	52	Finals series
3	Swan Districts	18	11	6	1	1428	1254	113.9	46	Finals series
4	East Fremantle	18	12	6	0	1505	1061	141.8	44 (Note: East Fremantle were deducted 4 points due to breaching their salary cap in the 2022 WAFL season.)	Finals series
5	Claremont	18	11	7	0	1304	1126	115.8	44	Finals series
6	South Fremantle	18	10	7	1	1274	1189	107.1	42	
7	Subiaco	18	6	12	0	1230	1418	86.7	24	
8	West Perth	18	4	14	0	1330	1549	85.9	16	
9	Perth	18	4	14	0	1080	1364	79.2	16	
10	West Coast (R)	18	4	14	0	1096	1915	57.2	16	

Source: WAFL.com.au
Rules for classification: 1) points; 2) percentage; 3) number of points for.
(P) Premiers
Notes:

(R) = Reserves for AFL Seniors

== Notable events ==
- Prior to the start of the season, two players from Peel Thunder were suspended over "lewd incidents" at a pre-season camp.
  Jack Ilott was suspended for the entire 2024 season after making an "inappropriate sexual comment towards a woman associated with the club", while Michael Sellwood was suspended for one match over a separate "crude incident".
- East Fremantle could not play at their home ground, East Fremantle Oval due to renovations all season.
- On 13 July 2024, South Fremantle Colts player Nick Campo was killed after a car carrying several players rolled over in North Lake.
