= 2026 WAFL season =

142nd season of the West Australian Football League

- Date: 3 April – 20 September 2026
- Teams: 10
- Premiers: Peel Thunder; 4th premiership
- Runners-up: Claremont; 16th runners-up
- Minor premiers: Peel Thunder; 1st minor premiership
- Sandover Medal: Jake Florenca (South Fremantle – 27 votes)
- Bernie Naylor Medal: Tyler Keitel (West Perth – 51 goals)

The 2026 WAFL season was the 142nd season of the West Australian Football League (WAFL), the highest-level men's Australian rules football competition in Western Australia. The season began on 3 April and concluded on 20 September.

Peel Thunder won the premiership for the fourth time, defeating Claremont by 62 points in the Grand Final. It marked Peel's second title in three seasons and made the club the most successful side through the last 10 years, having won all four of their premierships in that time.

== Background ==
South Fremantle entered the season off the back of their 15th premiership, having defeated East Perth by two points in the grand final. WA Football confirmed that several of the rule changes adopted for the 2026 AFL season would also be incorporated in the WAFL, including the discontinuation of the centre bounce and a last disposal out of bounds rule between the 50-metre arcs, among others.

== Clubs ==
=== Venues and leadership ===
Club	Coach	Captain(s)	Home ground(s)	Capacity	Ref(s)
Claremont	Ash Prescott	Bailey Rogers; Callan England (co-captains)	Revo Fitness Stadium	5,000	
East Fremantle	Bill Monaghan	Kyle Baskerville	The Good Grocer Park	5,000	
East Perth	Ross McQueen	Hamish Brayshaw; Christian Ameduri (co-captains)	Sullivan Logistics Stadium	10,000	
Peel Thunder (A)	Adam Read	Jack Sears	Lane Group Stadium	9,000	
Perth	Mark Stone	Corey Byrne; Charlie Constable (co-captains)	Mineral Resources Park	5,000	
South Fremantle	Craig White	Chad Pearson	Fremantle Community Bank Oval	10,000	
Subiaco	Jarrad Schofield	Greg Clark	Sullivan Logistics Stadium	10,000	
Swan Districts	Andrew Pruyn	Jesse Turner	Steel Blue Oval	15,000	
West Coast	Kyal Horsley	Callum Jamieson	Mineral Resources Park	5,000	
West Perth	Paul Sanzone	Luke Meadows	HIF Health Insurance Oval	12,500	

(A) = Club is in a reserves affiliation with an Australian Football League (AFL) club

== Home-and-away season ==
Source: Click here

=== Round 1 ===
	Round 1
Friday, 3 April (4:10 pm)	Peel Thunder 13.13 (91)	def.	East Fremantle 11.12 (78)	Lane Group Stadium	Report
Friday, 3 April (5:10 pm)	Perth 24.9 (153)	def.	West Coast 13.10 (88)	Mineral Resources Park	Report
Friday, 3 April (5:30 pm)	Swan Districts 9.9 (63)	def. by	South Fremantle 16.12 (108)	Steel Blue Oval	Report
Friday, 3 April (7:10 pm)	Subiaco 18.11 (119)	def.	East Perth 17.10 (112)	Sullivan Logistics Stadium	Report
Saturday, 4 April (6:30 pm)	West Perth 8.4 (52)	def. by	Claremont 19.12 (126)	HIF Health Insurance Oval	Report

=== Round 2 ===
	Round 2
Saturday, 11 April (3:40 pm)	South Fremantle 11.18 (84)	def.	Perth 5.8 (38)	Fremantle Community Bank Oval	Report
Saturday, 11 April (4:10 pm)	East Perth 13.12 (90)	def.	Swan Districts 10.10 (70)	Sullivan Logistics Stadium	Report
Saturday, 11 April (4:30 pm)	East Fremantle 10.11 (71)	def.	Subiaco 9.14 (68)	The Good Grocer Park	Report
Saturday, 11 April (4:30 pm)	Claremont 7.10 (52)	def.	Peel Thunder 6.5 (41)	Revo Fitness Stadium	Report
Sunday, 12 April (3:10 pm)	West Coast 17.5 (107)	def.	West Perth 12.20 (92)	Mineral Resources Park	Report

=== Round 3 ===
	Round 3
Saturday, 18 April (3:10 pm)	Peel Thunder 9.11 (65)	def. by	Perth 10.6 (66)	Lane Group Stadium	Report
Saturday, 18 April (4:30 pm)	Swan Districts 12.14 (86)	def.	West Perth 9.10 (64)	Steel Blue Oval	Report
Saturday, 18 April (4:40 pm)	South Fremantle 9.15 (69)	def. by	Claremont 11.8 (74)	Fremantle Community Bank Oval	Report
Saturday, 18 April (7:10 pm)	East Perth 9.11 (65)	def. by	East Fremantle 12.6 (78)	Sullivan Logistics Stadium	Report
Sunday, 19 April (1:10 pm)	West Coast 16.12 (108)	def.	Subiaco 12.9 (81)	Mineral Resources Park	Report

=== Round 4 ===
	Round 4
Saturday, 25 April (2:10 pm)	Perth 7.14 (56)	def. by	East Perth 8.12 (60)	Mineral Resources Park	Report
Saturday, 25 April (2:30 pm)	Subiaco 10.8 (68)	def.	Peel Thunder 10.7 (67)	Sullivan Logistics Stadium	Report
Saturday, 25 April (2:30 pm)	Claremont 21.11 (137)	def.	East Fremantle 3.8 (26)	Revo Fitness Stadium	Report
Sunday, 26 April (1:10 pm)	West Coast 14.10 (94)	def.	Swan Districts 13.15 (93)	Mineral Resources Park	Report
Sunday, 26 April (2:10 pm)	West Perth 7.5 (47)	def. by	South Fremantle 11.11 (77)	HIF Health Insurance Oval	Report

=== Round 5 ===
	Round 5
Saturday, 2 May (1:10 pm)	Peel Thunder 21.9 (135)	def.	West Perth 10.4 (64)	Lane Group Stadium	Report
Saturday, 2 May (2:10 pm)	West Coast 9.11 (65)	def. by	East Perth 16.12 (108)	Mineral Resources Park	Report
Saturday, 2 May (2:10 pm)	Claremont 14.17 (101)	def.	Swan Districts 9.8 (62)	Revo Fitness Stadium	Report
Saturday, 2 May (2:30 pm)	East Fremantle 7.5 (47)	def. by	Perth 11.12 (78)	The Good Grocer Park	Report
Saturday, 2 May (4:10 pm)	Subiaco 10.9 (69)	def. by	South Fremantle 11.6 (72)	Sullivan Logistics Stadium	Report

=== Round 6 ===
	Round 6
Saturday, 9 May (1:40 pm)	South Fremantle 19.11 (125)	def.	West Coast 10.4 (64)	Fremantle Community Bank Oval	Report
Saturday, 9 May (2:10 pm)	Perth 8.11 (59)	def. by	Claremont 17.9 (111)	Mineral Resources Park	Report
Saturday, 9 May (2:30 pm)	East Perth 8.8 (56)	def. by	Peel Thunder 9.8 (62)	Sullivan Logistics Stadium	Report
Saturday, 9 May (2:30 pm)	Swan Districts 16.9 (105)	def.	East Fremantle 9.9 (63)	Steel Blue Oval	Report
Saturday, 9 May (4:10 pm)	West Perth 7.10 (52)	def. by	Subiaco 15.9 (99)	HIF Health Insurance Oval	Report

=== Round 7 ===
	Round 7
Saturday, 23 May (1:10 pm)	East Fremantle 15.12 (102)	def.	West Coast 11.9 (75)	The Good Grocer Park	Report
Saturday, 23 May (1:10 pm)	Peel Thunder 13.10 (88)	def.	South Fremantle 10.10 (70)	Lane Group Stadium	Report
Saturday, 23 May (2:10 pm)	Perth 21.15 (141)	def.	West Perth 9.9 (63)	Mineral Resources Park	Report
Saturday, 23 May (2:30 pm)	Swan Districts 8.7 (55)	def. by	Subiaco 14.11 (95)	Steel Blue Oval	Report
Saturday, 23 May (2:30 pm)	Claremont 6.4 (40)	def. by	East Perth 11.13 (79)	Revo Fitness Stadium	Report

=== Round 8 ===
	Round 8
Saturday, 30 May (2:30 pm)	Subiaco 8.11 (59)	def. by	Claremont 9.8 (62)	Sullivan Logistics Stadium	Report
Saturday, 30 May (2:30 pm)	Swan Districts 10.9 (69)	def.	Perth 8.10 (58)	Steel Blue Oval	Report
Sunday, 31 May (1:10 pm)	West Coast 4.9 (33)	def. by	Peel Thunder 8.7 (55)	Mineral Resources Park	Report
Monday, 1 June (1:10 pm)	South Fremantle 9.11 (65)	def. by	East Fremantle 15.9 (99)	Fremantle Community Bank Oval	Report
Monday, 1 June (2:30 pm)	West Perth 8.12 (60)	def.	East Perth 8.8 (56)	HIF Health Insurance Oval	Report

=== Round 9 ===
	Round 9
Saturday, 6 June (1:10 pm)	Peel Thunder 14.11 (95)	def.	Swan Districts 4.9 (33)	Lane Group Stadium	Report
Saturday, 6 June (1:10 pm)	Claremont 15.7 (97)	def. by	West Coast 16.11 (107)	Revo Fitness Stadium	Report
Saturday, 6 June (2:30 pm)	Perth 12.3 (75)	def.	Subiaco 7.13 (55)	Mineral Resources Park	Report
Sunday, 7 June (2:10 pm)	East Perth 12.11 (83)	def.	South Fremantle 4.11 (35)	Sullivan Logistics Stadium	Report
	Bye; East Fremantle, West Perth

=== Round 10 ===
	Round 10
Saturday, 13 June (2:30 pm)	East Fremantle 16.15 (111)	def.	West Perth 13.7 (85)	The Good Grocer Park	Report
Saturday, 13 June (2:30 pm)	Claremont 14.7 (91)	def. by	Perth 17.6 (108)	Revo Fitness Stadium	Report
Saturday, 13 June (2:30 pm)	Swan Districts 13.11 (89)	def. by	West Coast 14.12 (96)	Steel Blue Oval	Report
	Bye; East Perth, Peel Thunder, South Fremantle, Subiaco

=== Round 11 ===
	Round 11
Saturday, 20 June (2:10 pm)	Subiaco 11.6 (72)	def.	East Fremantle 7.5 (47)	Sullivan Logistics Stadium	Report
Saturday, 20 June (2:30 pm)	South Fremantle 11.12 (78)	def.	West Perth 5.9 (39)	Fremantle Community Bank Oval	Report
Saturday, 20 June (2:30 pm)	Peel Thunder 23.4 (142)	def.	East Perth 6.8 (44)	Lane Group Stadium	Report
	Bye; West Coast, Claremont, Perth, Swan Districts

=== Round 12 ===
	Round 12
Friday, 26 June (7:10 pm)	East Perth 10.5 (65)	def.	West Coast 8.12 (60)	Sullivan Logistics Stadium	Report
Saturday, 27 June (2:10 pm)	East Fremantle 10.5 (65)	def. by	Claremont 11.5 (71)	The Good Grocer Park	Report
Saturday, 27 June (2:10 pm)	Perth 12.7 (79)	def.	South Fremantle 6.9 (45)	Mineral Resources Park	Report
Saturday, 27 June (2:30 pm)	Subiaco 9.6 (60)	def.	Swan Districts 8.8 (56)	Sullivan Logistics Stadium	Report
Saturday, 27 June (2:30 pm)	West Perth 5.4 (34)	def. by	Peel Thunder 17.20 (122)	HIF Health Insurance Oval	Report

=== Round 13 ===
	Round 13
Friday, 3 July (7:10 pm)	West Coast 18.11 (119)	def.	East Fremantle 12.8 (80)	Mineral Resources Park	Report
Saturday, 4 July (1:10 pm)	Peel Thunder 8.11 (59)	def.	Claremont 8.8 (56)	Lane Group Stadium	Report
Saturday, 4 July (2:30 pm)	South Fremantle 10.13 (73)	def.	Subiaco 11.6 (72)	Fremantle Community Bank Oval	Report
Saturday, 4 July (2:40 pm)	East Perth 15.13 (103)	def.	Perth 8.4 (52)	Sullivan Logistics Stadium	Report
Saturday, 4 July (3:10 pm)	West Perth 9.12 (66)	def. by	Swan Districts 13.13 (91)	HIF Health Insurance Oval	Report

=== Round 14 ===
	Round 14
Saturday, 11 July (2:10 pm)	Claremont 7.11 (53)	def. by	South Fremantle 9.10 (64)	Revo Fitness Stadium	Report
Saturday, 11 July (2:30 pm)	East Fremantle 4.10 (34)	def. by	Peel Thunder 18.10 (118)	The Good Grocer Park	Report
Saturday, 11 July (2:30 pm)	Swan Districts 13.11 (89)	def.	East Perth 10.10 (70)	Steel Blue Oval	Report
Sunday, 12 July (1:10 pm)	West Coast 9.4 (58)	def. by	Perth 18.12 (120)	Mineral Resources Park	Report
	Bye; Subiaco, West Perth

=== Round 15 ===
	Round 15
Saturday, 18 July (2:10 pm)	Perth 10.6 (66)	def.	East Fremantle 9.9 (63)	Mineral Resources Park	Report
Saturday, 18 July (2:30 pm)	Subiaco 18.6 (114)	def.	West Perth 15.16 (106)	Sullivan Logistics Stadium	Report
Saturday, 18 July (2:30 pm)	South Fremantle 7.10 (52)	def.	Swan Districts 5.11 (41)	Fremantle Community Bank Oval	Report
	Bye; Claremont, East Perth, Peel Thunder, West Coast

=== Round 16 ===
	Round 16
Saturday, 25 July (2:30 pm)	East Perth 8.3 (51)	def. by	Claremont 12.11 (83)	Sullivan Logistics Stadium	Report
Saturday, 25 July (2:30 pm)	Peel Thunder 11.11 (77)	def.	Subiaco 11.3 (69)	Lane Group Stadium	Report
Saturday, 25 July (4:30 pm)	West Perth 13.12 (90)	def. by	West Coast 15.12 (102)	HIF Health Insurance Oval	Report
	Bye; East Fremantle, Perth, South Fremantle, Swan Districts

=== Round 17 ===
	Round 17
Saturday, 1 August (1:10 pm)	Swan Districts 7.4 (46)	def. by	Peel Thunder 13.10 (88)	Steel Blue Oval	Report
Saturday, 1 August (2:30 pm)	Claremont 13.12 (90)	def.	West Perth 10.7 (67)	Revo Fitness Stadium	Report
Saturday, 1 August (2:30 pm)	Subiaco 10.10 (70)	def.	Perth 9.15 (69)	Sullivan Logistics Stadium	Report
Saturday, 1 August (2:30 pm)	East Fremantle 9.7 (61)	def. by	East Perth 12.11 (83)	The Good Grocer Park	Report
Sunday, 2 August (11:10 am)	West Coast 15.12 (102)	def.	South Fremantle 11.17 (83)	Mineral Resources Park	Report

=== Round 18 ===
	Round 18
Saturday, 8 August (2:10 pm)	Perth 5.9 (39)	def. by	Peel Thunder 8.6 (54)	Mineral Resources Park	Report
Saturday, 8 August (2:30 pm)	Swan Districts 3.11 (29)	def. by	Claremont 7.9 (51)	Steel Blue Oval	Report
Saturday, 8 August (2:30 pm)	Subiaco 8.8 (56)	def. by	West Coast 10.13 (73)	Sullivan Logistics Stadium	Report
Saturday, 8 August (2:30 pm)	South Fremantle 4.8 (32)	def. by	East Perth 7.10 (52)	Fremantle Community Bank Oval	Report
Saturday, 8 August (3:10 pm)	West Perth 14.12 (96)	def.	East Fremantle 7.9 (51)	HIF Health Insurance Oval	Report

=== Round 19 ===
	Round 19
Saturday, 15 August (2:10 pm)	East Fremantle 9.10 (64)	def. by	South Fremantle 15.8 (98)	The Good Grocer Park	Report
Saturday, 15 August (2:30 pm)	Peel Thunder 11.16 (82)	def. by	West Coast 14.7 (91)	Lane Group Stadium	Report
Saturday, 15 August (2:30 pm)	East Perth 18.11 (119)	def.	West Perth 8.7 (55)	Sullivan Logistics Stadium	Report
Saturday, 15 August (2:30 pm)	Claremont 11.8 (74)	def. by	Subiaco 11.9 (75)	Revo Fitness Stadium	Report
Saturday, 15 August (3:10 pm)	Perth 14.10 (94)	def.	Swan Districts 11.9 (75)	Mineral Resources Park	Report

=== Round 20 ===
	Round 20
Saturday, 22 August (2:10 pm)	East Perth 8.8 (56)	def. by	Subiaco 14.7 (91)	Sullivan Logistics Stadium	Report
Saturday, 22 August (2:10 pm)	South Fremantle 12.6 (78)	def.	Peel Thunder 11.8 (74)	Fremantle Community Bank Oval	Report
Saturday, 22 August (2:30 pm)	East Fremantle 11.10 (76)	def. by	Swan Districts 15.11 (101)	The Good Grocer Park	Report
Saturday, 22 August (3:10 pm)	West Perth 10.9 (69)	def. by	Perth 10.14 (74)	HIF Health Insurance Oval	Report
Saturday, 22 August (3:20 pm)	West Coast 14.13 (97)	def. by	Claremont 20.10 (130)	Mineral Resources Park	Report

== Ladder ==
Pos	Team	Pld	W	L	D	PF	PA	PP	Pts	Qualification
1	Peel Thunder (P)	18	13	5	0	1515	1011	149.9	52	Finals series
2	Claremont	18	12	6	0	1499	1169	128.2	48	Finals series
3	Perth	18	11	7	0	1425	1270	112.2	44	Finals series
4	South Fremantle	18	11	7	0	1308	1201	108.9	44	Finals series
5	East Perth	18	10	8	0	1352	1250	108.2	40	Finals series
6	Subiaco	18	10	8	0	1392	1305	106.7	40	
7	West Coast (R)	18	10	8	0	1539	1701	90.5	40	
8	Swan Districts	18	6	12	0	1253	1421	88.2	24	
9	East Fremantle	18	5	13	0	1216	1593	76.3	20	
10	West Perth	18	2	16	0	1201	1779	67.5	8	

Source: WAFL.com.au
Rules for classification: 1) points; 2) percentage; 3) number of points for.
(P) Premiers

(R) = Reserves for AFL seniors

== Finals series ==
=== Qualifying and elimination finals ===
	Qualifying final
Saturday, 29 August (2:10 pm)	Claremont 12.5 (77)	def.	Perth 8.12 (60)	Revo Fitness Stadium	Report

	Elimination final
Sunday, 30 August (2:10 pm)	South Fremantle 7.10 (52)	def. by	East Perth 8.9 (57)	Fremantle Community Bank Oval	Report

=== Semi-finals ===
	Semi finals
Saturday, 5 September (2:30pm)	Peel Thunder 13.7 (85)	def.	Claremont 8.9 (57)	Lane Group Stadium	Report
Saturday, 5 September (2:30pm)	Perth 12.13 (85)	def. by	East Perth 13.9 (87)	Mineral Resources Park	Report

=== Preliminary finals ===
	Preliminary final
Sunday, 13 September (2:10pm)	Claremont 8.10 (58)	def.	East Perth 7.8 (50)	Revo Fitness Stadium	Report

=== Grand Final ===
2026 WAFL Grand Final
Sunday 20 September (1:10 pm)	Peel Thunder	def.	Claremont	Optus Stadium (crowd: 19,210)
6.6 (42); 12.9 (81); 14.12 (96); 16.17 (113)	Q1; Q2; Q3; Final	1.3 (9); 3.4 (22); 5.9 (39); 7.9 (51)	Simpson Medal: Jeremy Sharp (Peel Thunder); Television broadcast: Seven Network
Nicholls 3, Tuia 3, Murray 2, Carr 2, Tregenza 2, Sanders, Sharp, Sears, Simpson	Goals	van Rooyen 2, Mainwaring 2, Delacey, Musika, Waterman
Sharp, Banfield, O'Meara, Walker, Nicholls	Best	Pearce, Alvarez, England, Rogers, Mainwaring, Gale

== Awards ==
- Sandover Medal

Jake Florenca (South Fremantle) − 27 votes

- Bernie Naylor Medal

Tyler Keitel (West Perth) − 51 goals

- Rodriguez Shield

Claremont

- Reserves Premiers

Swan Districts

- Colts Premiers

East Fremantle

== Representative match ==
=== WAFL vs SANFL ===
For the eighth successive season, an interstate representative match was fixtured between the WAFL and South Australian National Football League (SANFL), with the two teams playing for the Haydn Bunton Junior Cup.

2026 State Game
Saturday, 16 May (3:10pm AWST)	WAFL	def.	SANFL	Sullivan Logistics Stadium (crowd: 3,671)
4.1 (25); 9.4 (58); 11.9 (75); 14.14 (98)	Q1; Q2; Q3; Final	2.2 (14); 3.3 (21); 4.6 (30); 9.8 (62)	Simpson Medal (WAFL) & Fos Williams Medal (SANFL): Callan England (WAFL) & Beau Thomas (SANFL); Television broadcast: Seven Network
Hinder 3 Hunter, Reidy 2 Bevan, Clarke, Davis, Jones, Mainwaring, Mayo, Sears 1	Goals	A. Grace, Thomas 3 Emmett, Francis, Herbert 1
England, Bevan, Turner, Mayo, Ameduri, Hinder, Reidy	Best	Thomas, Lowe, E. Grace, A. Grace, Francis

=== Western Australian team ===
2026 WAFL State Team vs. South Australia
B:	18. Ethan Hughes (South Fremantle)	28. Noah Strom (South Fremantle)	10. Zac Guadagnin (West Perth)
HB:	8. Jamaine Jones (South Fremantle)	26. Chad Pearson (South Fremantle)	6. Stanley Wright (East Perth)
C:	2. Stefan Giro (Subiaco)	1. Christian Ameduri (c) East Perth)	19. Jesse Turner (Swan Districts)
HF:	3. Zac Mainwaring (Claremont)	31. Jaiden Hunter (Claremont)	4. Joeseph Hinder (West Perth)
F:	16. Jiah Reidy (Swan Districts)	29. Aaron Clarke (Perth)	17. Jack Sears (Peel Thunder)
Foll:	33. Scott Jones (East Perth)	9. Callan England (Claremont)	20. Lachlan Tardrew (Peel Thunder)
Int:	15. Kane Bevan (West Perth)	12. Galen Savigni (Subiaco)	25. Austin Davis (Perth)
Int:	23. Kyle Baskerville (East Fremantle)	21. Jack Mayo (Subiaco)	
Coach:	Adam Read (Peel Thunder)		
Emg:	11. Scott Tuia (Peel Thunder)	14. Ryan Borchet (Subiaco)	24. Corey Watts (East Perth)

== See also ==
- 2026 WAFL Women's season
