= 2025 Fremantle Football Club season =

Australian rules football season

Fremantle Dockers
2025 season
- Elimination Final vs Gold Coast pre-game
- President: Chris Sutherland
- Coach: Justin Longmuir
- Captain: Alex Pearce
- Home ground: Optus Stadium (capacity: 61,266)
- Pre-season: 1 win, 1 loss
- AFL season: 16 wins, 7 losses
- Finals Series: 0 wins, 1 loss
- Doig Medal: Caleb Serong
- Leading goalkicker: Josh Treacy (44)
- Highest home attendance: 57,507
- Lowest home attendance: 37,570
- Average home attendance: 45,758

The 2025 Fremantle Football Club season is the club's 31st season of senior competition in the Australian Football League (AFL).

== Overview ==
Fremantle's 2025 season overview
Captain	Coach	Home ground	W–L–D	Ladder	Finals	Best and fairest	Leading goalkicker	Refs
Alex Pearce	Justin Longmuir	Optus Stadium	16-7-0	6th	Elimination Final	Caleb Serong	Josh Treacy (44)	

Overall, Fremantle's 2025 season was a successful one with them returning to Finals for the first time since 2022. Fremantle recorded their equal second most wins in a season, with 16, though however that only managed them a 6th place at the end of the Home and Away season. 2025 came with the retirements of Fremantle legends Nat Fyfe and Michael Walters, the emergence of a young star in Murphy Reid and a cult hero in Patrick Voss. Caleb Serong won his 3rd Doig Medal in a row and Josh Treacy topped the club goal kicking charts for the second consecutive year with 44 goals.

=== Squad changes ===
==== In ====
No.	Name	Position	Previous club	via
15	(Western Australia) Shai Bolton	Midfielder/Forward	Richmond	trade
16	(Victoria (state)) Murphy Reid	Midfielder/Forward	Sandringham Dragons	draft
19	(Western Australia) Quinton Narkle	Forward	Port Adelaide	pre-season supplemental selection
22	(South Australia) Charlie Nicholls	Key Forward	Central Districts	draft
38	(Western Australia) Jaren Carr	Forward	South Fremantle	draft
42	(Western Australia) Aiden Riddle	Ruck	Claremont	draft
43	(South Australia) Isaiah Dudley	Forward	Central Districts	pre-season supplemental selection

==== Out ====
No.	Name	Position	New Club	via
15	(Western Australia) Ethan Hughes	Defender	South Fremantle	delisted
18	(South Australia) Tom Emmett	Forward	Sturt	delisted
20	(Victoria (state)) Matt Taberner	Key Forward	–	delisted
22	(Victoria (state)) Max Knobel	Ruck	Gold Coast	delisted
43	(Western Australia) Sebit Kuek	Key Forward	East Perth	delisted
45	(Western Australia) Conrad Williams	Forward	Perth	delisted
46	(Victoria (state)) Ethan Stanley	Midfielder	Box Hill	delisted

== 2025 player squad ==
See also Fremantle Football Club drafting and trading history for the complete list of Fremantle's draft selections, delistings and trades

Fremantle Football Club
Senior list		Rookie list	Coaching staff
1 Sam Sturt; 2 Jaeger O'Meara; 3 Caleb Serong (vc); 4 Sean Darcy; 5 Heath Chapman; 6 Jordan Clark; 7 Nat Fyfe (ret); 8 Andrew Brayshaw (vc); 9 Luke Jackson; 10 Michael Walters (ret); 11 James Aish (ret); 12 Hugh Davies; 13 Luke Ryan; 15 Shai Bolton; 16 Murphy Reid; 17 Will Brodie; 21 Oscar McDonald; 22 Charlie Nicholls	23 Karl Worner; 24 Jye Amiss; 25 Alex Pearce (c); 26 Hayden Young; 28 Neil Erasmus; 29 Cooper Simpson; 30 Nathan O'Driscoll; 31 Brandon Walker; 32 Michael Frederick; 33 Ollie Murphy; 34 Corey Wagner; 35 Josh Treacy; 36 Brennan Cox; 38 Jaren Carr; 39 Sam Switkowski; 40 Jack Delean; 41 Bailey Banfield; 44 Matthew Johnson	14 Jeremy Sharp; 18 Liam Reidy; 19 Quinton Narkle (ret); 20 Patrick Voss; 27 Odin Jones; 37 Josh Draper (B); 42 Aiden Riddle; 43 Isaiah Dudley	Head coach: Justin Longmuir; Assistant coaches: Jaymie Graham (forwards coach); Joel Corey (midfield coach); Harry Garland (stoppages coach); Jade Rawlings (backline coach); Todd Curley (opposition strategy coach); Geoff Valentine (head of player development); Andrew Sturgess (development coach); Tendai Mzungu (development coach); Sam Naismith (ruck & development coach); Legend: (c) Captain(s); (vc) Vice-captain(s); (B) Category B rookie; Long-term injury; Updated: 30 September 2026; Source(s): Players, Coaches

== Season ==
=== Pre Season ===
Fremantle's 2025 Pre Season fixtures
Game	Date and local time	Opponent	Scores^{[a]}			Venue	Attendance	Ref
Game	Date and local time	Opponent	Home	Away	Result	Venue	Attendance	Ref
Indigenous All-Stars match	Saturday, 15 February (4:30 pm)	Indigenous All-Stars	9.11 (65)	16.12 (108)	Lost by 43 points	Optus Stadium	37,865	
Community Series	Sunday, 2 March (3:10 pm)	Melbourne	16.13 (109)	11.24 (90)	Won by 19 points	Lane Group Stadium	7,458	

=== Home & Away Season ===
Fremantle's 2025 AFL season fixture
Round	Date and local time	Opponent	Scores^{[a]}			Venue	Attendance	Ladder position	Ref
Round	Date and local time	Opponent	Home	Away	Result	Venue	Attendance	Ladder position	Ref
OR	Bye							9th	Bye
1	Saturday, 15 March (1:20 pm)	Geelong	23.9 (147)	10.9 (69)	Lost by 78 points	GMHBA Stadium [A]	40,604	16th ▼	
2	Sunday, 23 March (3:10 pm)	Sydney	9.11 (65)	9.14 (68)	Lost by 3 points	Optus Stadium [H]	43,882	17th ▼	
3	Sunday, 30 March (3:10 pm)	West Coast	10.8 (68)	15.16 (106)	Won by 38 points	Optus Stadium [A]	53,289	13th ▲	
4	Sunday, 6 April (3:10 pm)	Western Bulldogs	15.7 (97)	12.9 (81)	Won by 16 points	Optus Stadium [H]	41,491	11th ▲	
5	Sunday, 13 April (12:05 pm)	Richmond	7.5 (47)	16.12 (108)	Won by 61 points	Adelaide Hills [A]	10,028	8th ▲	
6	Saturday, 19 April (1:20 pm)	Melbourne	16.11 (107)	14.13 (97)	Lost by 10 points	MCG [A]	25,202	9th ▼	
7	Friday, 25 April (6:10 pm)	Adelaide	12.13 (85)	9.13 (67)	Won by 18 points	Optus Stadium [H]	53,048	9th	
8	Friday, 2 May (7:40 pm)	St Kilda	14.10 (94)	5.3 (33)	Lost by 61 points	Marvel Stadium [A]	20,522	9th	
9	Thursday, 8 May (6:10 pm)	Collingwood	12.11 (83)	15.7 (97)	Lost by 14 points	Optus Stadium [H]	47,780	11th ▼	
10	Saturday, 17 May (4:15 pm)	Greater Western Sydney	8.13 (61)	13.17 (95)	Won by 34 points	ENGIE Stadium [A]	8,092	9th ▲	
11	Saturday, 24 May (6:10 pm)	Port Adelaide	15.10 (100)	7.9 (51)	Won by 49 points	Optus Stadium [H]	40,466	9th	
12	Saturday, 31 May (1:20 pm)	Gold Coast	9.10 (64)	11.9 (75)	Won by 11 points	People First Stadium [A]	11,750	8th ▲	
13	Bye							8th	Bye
14	Saturday, 14 June (5:35 pm)	North Melbourne	10.7 (67)	10.13 (73)	Won by 6 points	Optus Stadium [A]	31,408	8th	
15	Thursday, 19 June (6:10 pm)	Essendon	16.8 (104)	9.9 (63)	Won by 41 points	Optus Stadium [H]	37,570	6th ▲	
16	Sunday, 29 June (3:10 pm)	St Kilda	11.15 (81)	9.15 (69)	Won by 12 points	Optus Stadium [H]	41,600	6th	
17	Sunday, 6 July (1:10 pm)	Sydney	14.10 (94)	12.11 (83)	Lost by 11 points	SCG [A]	32,007	9th ▼	
18	Saturday, 12 July (6:10 pm)	Hawthorn	12.5 (77)	9.10 (64)	Won by 13 points	Optus Stadium [H]	49,460	8th ▲	
19	Sunday, 20 July (3:20 pm)	Collingwood	11.12 (78)	12.7 (79)	Won by 1 point	MCG [A]	62,198	7th ▲	
20	Saturday, 26 July (2:15 pm)	West Coast	18.18 (126)	12.5 (77)	Won by 49 points	Optus Stadium [H]	54,384	7th	
21	Sunday, 3 August (3:10 pm)	Carlton	15.4 (94)	10.7 (67)	Won by 27 points	Optus Stadium [H]	39,358	5th ▲	
22	Saturday, 9 August (7:40 pm)	Port Adelaide	13.8 (86)	13.14 (92)	Won by 6 points	Adelaide Oval [A]	30,390	4th ▲	
23	Friday, 15 August (6:20 pm)	Brisbane Lions	5.14 (44)	15.11 (101)	Lost by 57 points	Optus Stadium [H]	54,302	7th ▼	
24	Sunday, 24 August (3:15 pm)	Western Bulldogs	14.13 (97)	17.10 (112)	Won by 15 points	Marvel Stadium [A]	44,069	6th ▲	

=== Finals ===
Fremantle's Finals fixture
Round	Date and local time	Opponent	Scores^{[a]}			Venue	Attendance	Ref
Round	Date and local time	Opponent	Home	Away	Result	Venue	Attendance	Ref
FW1	Saturday, 6 September (5:35 pm)	Gold Coast	12.7 (79)	11.14 (80)	Lost by 1 point	Optus Stadium [H]	57,507	

- NOTE: All game times are set at the local venue time of that match.

=== Ladder ===
Pos	Team	Pld	W	L	D	PF	PA	PP	Pts	Qualification
1	Adelaide	23	18	5	0	2278	1635	139.3	72	Finals series
2	Geelong	23	17	6	0	2425	1714	141.5	68	Finals series
3	Brisbane Lions (P)	23	16	6	1	2061	1804	114.2	66	Finals series
4	Collingwood	23	16	7	0	1991	1627	122.4	64	Finals series
5	Greater Western Sydney	23	16	7	0	2114	1834	115.3	64	Finals series
6	Fremantle	23	16	7	0	1978	1815	109.0	64	Finals series
7	Gold Coast	23	15	8	0	2173	1740	124.9	60	Finals series
8	Hawthorn	23	15	8	0	2045	1691	120.9	60	Finals series
9	Western Bulldogs	23	14	9	0	2493	1820	137.0	56	
10	Sydney	23	12	11	0	1845	1902	97.0	48	
11	Carlton	23	9	14	0	1799	1861	96.7	36	
12	St Kilda	23	9	14	0	1839	2077	88.5	36	
13	Port Adelaide	23	9	14	0	1705	2136	79.8	36	
14	Melbourne	23	7	16	0	1902	2038	93.3	28	
15	Essendon	23	6	17	0	1535	2209	69.5	24	
16	North Melbourne	23	5	17	1	1805	2365	76.3	22	
17	Richmond	23	5	18	0	1449	2197	66.0	20	
18	West Coast	23	1	22	0	1466	2438	60.1	4	

Source: afl.com.au
Rules for classification: 1) points; 2) percentage; 3) number of points for
(P) Premiers

== Statistics ==
As of the 2025 season. Players without appearances not included

No.	Name	Pos.	Games	Goals	Behinds	Kicks	Handballs	Disposals	Marks	Tackles	Hitouts
2	Jaeger O'Meara	MF	14	2	2	106	137	243	36	49	0
3	Caleb Serong	MF	24	7	6	331	326	657	41	113	0
4	Sean Darcy	RU	17	5	2	83	84	167	25	51	450
5	Heath Chapman	DF	23	0	0	191	104	295	100	50	0
6	Jordan Clark	DF	24	2	3	381	197	579	112	73	0
7	Nat Fyfe	MF	8	0	0	17	31	48	9	6	0
8	Andrew Brayshaw	MF	24	7	8	292	358	647	70	161	0
9	Luke Jackson	RU/MF	21	20	7	153	220	373	72	86	458
11	James Aish	MF/DF	3	0	0	11	12	23	4	2	0
13	Luke Ryan	DF	24	0	0	384	114	498	146	48	0
14	Jeremy Sharp	MF	14	3	5	98	87	185	40	18	0
15	Shai Bolton	MF/FW	23	28	29	226	186	412	65	60	0
16	Murphy Reid	FW	24	25	18	188	159	347	49	47	0
18	Liam Reidy	RU	1	0	0	4	2	6	1	2	18
19	Quinton Narkle	MF	2	1	1	6	4	10	2	2	0
20	Patrick Voss	FW	20	37	23	126	68	194	65	44	32
21	Oscar McDonald	DF	7	4	0	49	17	66	32	17	7
23	Karl Worner	DF	23	0	4	179	137	316	94	49	0
24	Jye Amiss	FW	24	32	16	113	58	171	82	23	0
25	Alex Pearce	DF	16	4	0	101	76	177	79	20	0
26	Hayden Young	MF	9	7	0	84	67	151	18	28	0
28	Neil Erasmus	MF	16	2	3	121	134	255	42	40	0
29	Cooper Simpson	DF	3	1	0	22	10	32	8	3	0
30	Nathan O'Driscoll	MF	14	3	6	122	100	222	42	45	0
31	Brandon Walker	DF	2	0	0	9	9	18	1	5	0
32	Michael Frederick	FW	24	30	24	177	95	272	79	57	0
34	Corey Wagner	DF/MF	17	3	1	161	87	248	45	75	0
35	Josh Treacy	FW	24	44	18	186	90	276	120	44	13
36	Brennan Cox	DF	24	1	0	158	95	253	114	29	0
37	Josh Draper	DF	11	0	0	48	38	86	27	14	6
39	Sam Switkowski	FW	17	11	5	96	124	220	43	53	0
41	Bailey Banfield	DF/FW	21	4	2	172	106	278	69	46	0
43	Isaiah Dudley	FW	16	15	9	74	39	113	33	29	0
44	Matthew Johnson	MF	18	2	8	160	178	338	74	59	0

== Goalkickers ==
As of the 2025 season. Players without goals not included

Name	Goals	Games	Averages
Josh Treacy	44	24	1.8
Patrick Voss	37	20	1.9
Jye Amiss	32	24	1.3
Michael Frederick	30	24	1.3
Shai Bolton	28	23	1.2
Murphy Reid	25	24	1.0
Luke Jackson	20	21	1.0
Isaiah Dudley	15	16	0.9
Sam Switkowski	11	17	0.6
Hayden Young	7	9	0.8
Caleb Serong	7	24	0.3
Andrew Brayshaw	7	24	0.3
Sean Darcy	5	17	0.3
Oscar McDonald	4	7	0.6
Alex Pearce	4	16	0.3
Bailey Banfield	4	21	0.2
Nathan O'Driscoll	3	14	0.2
Corey Wagner	3	17	0.2
Jeremy Sharp	3	14	0.2
Jaeger O'Meara	2	15	0.1
Neil Erasmus	2	16	0.1
Matthew Johnson	2	18	0.1
Jordan Clark	2	24	0.1
Quinton Narkle	1	2	0.5
Cooper Simpson	1	3	0.3
Brennan Cox	1	24	0.0

== Awards, records and milestones ==
=== Awards ===
==== AFL awards ====
- All-Australian team: Caleb Serong, Jordan Clark
- 22under22 team: Murphy Reid
- AFLPA Best First Year Player: Murphy Reid
- AFL Rising Star: Murphy Reid

==== Brownlow Medal tally ====
Player	3 vote games	2 vote games	1 vote games	Total votes	Place
Andrew Brayshaw	4	6	2	26	5th
Caleb Serong	3	7	2	25	6th
Luke Jackson	4	1	3	17	20th
Jordan Clark	0	2	0	4	87th
Josh Treacy	1	0	1	4	87th
Hayden Young	1	0	0	3	96th
Patrick Voss	1	0	0	3	96th
Alex Pearce	0	1	0	2	122nd
Luke Ryan	0	0	2	2	122nd
Jaeger O'Meara	0	0	1	1	137th
Murphy Reid	0	0	1	1	137th
Total	14	15	12	88	-

==== Club awards ====
- Doig Medal: Caleb Serong
- Leading goalkicker: Josh Treacy
- Players' Award: Alex Pearce
- Beacon Award: Murphy Reid
- Best clubman: Patrick Voss

=== Records ===
- Most Score Assists and Goals Scored by a first year player: Murphy Reid (SA: 36, Goals: 25)

=== Milestones ===
==== Round 1 ====
- Murphy Reid – AFL Debut, 1st AFL goal

==== Round 2 ====
- Shai Bolton - Fremantle debut
- Luke Jackson – 100th AFL game

==== Round 3 ====
- Jye Amiss – 50th AFL game
- Isaiah Dudley – AFL Debut, 1st AFL goal
- Bailey Banfield – 100th AFL game

==== Round 4 ====
- Jeremy Sharp – 50th AFL game
- Andrew Brayshaw – 150th AFL game
- Shai Bolton – 1st Fremantle goal

==== Round 6 ====
- Oscar McDonald – 1st Fremantle goal

==== Round 7 ====
- Quinton Narkle – Fremantle debut

==== Round 8 ====
- Quinton Narkle – 1st Fremantle goal

==== Round 9 ====
- Heath Chapman – 50th AFL game

==== Round 10 ====
- Cooper Simpson – 1st AFL goal
- Michael Frederick – 100th AFL goal

==== Round 12 ====
- Corey Wagner – 1st Fremantle goal

==== Round 14 ====
- Matthew Johnson – 50th AFL game
- Corey Wagner – 50th AFL game

==== Round 15 ====
- Josh Treacy – 100th AFL goal

==== Round 17 ====
- Shai Bolton – 150th AFL game

==== Round 18 ====
- Jye Amiss – 100th AFL goal

==== Round 19 ====
- Sam Switkowski – 100th AFL game

==== Round 23 ====
- Michael Frederick – 100th AFL game

==== Finals Week 1 ====
- Jaeger O'Meara - 200th AFL game
