= 2024 Fremantle Football Club season =

Fremantle Dockers
2024 season
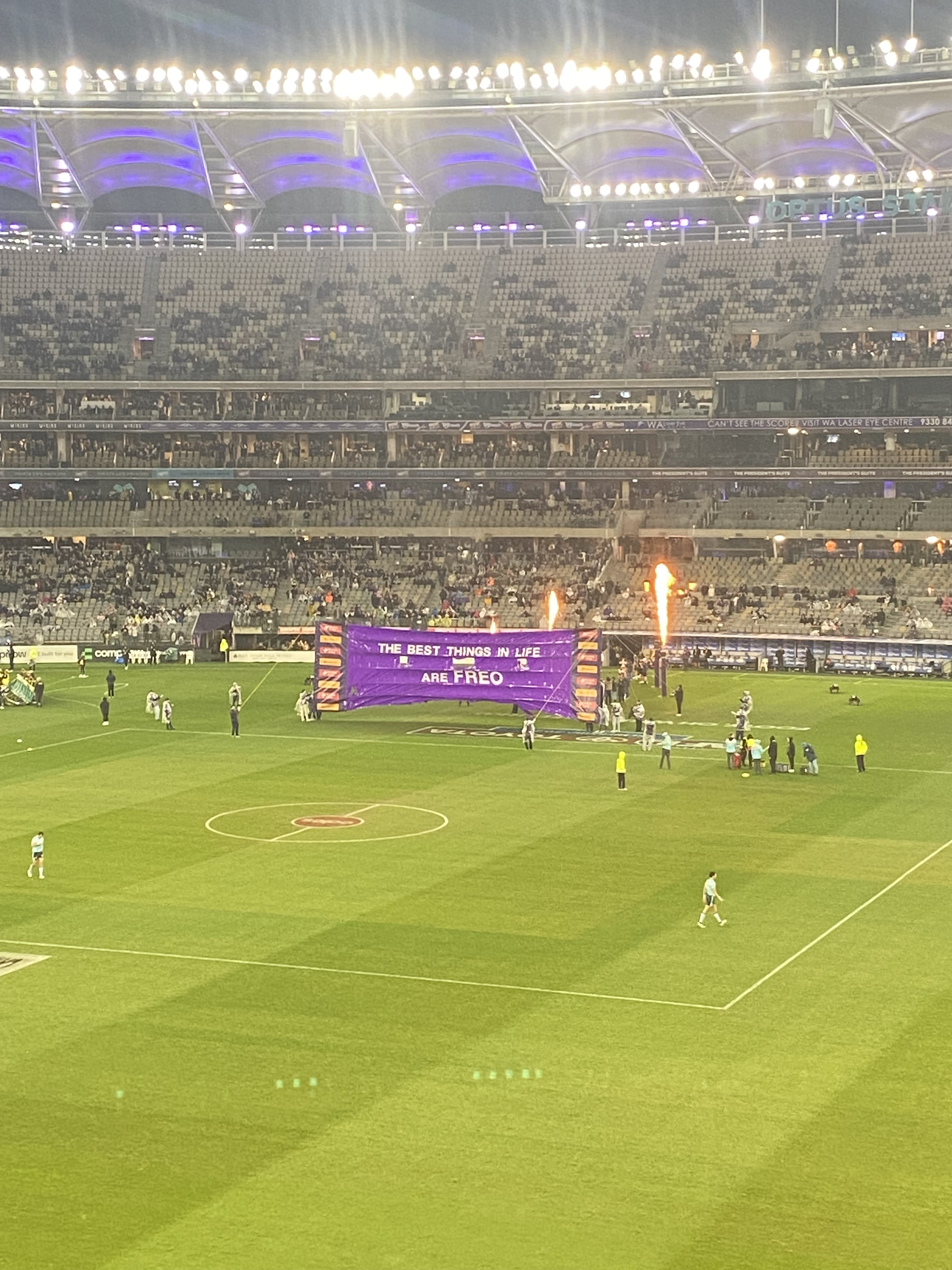
- Fremantle going onto the ground in Round 17
- President: Chris Sutherland
- Coach: Justin Longmuir
- Captain: Alex Pearce
- Home ground: Optus Stadium (capacity: 61,266)
- AAMI Community Series: 0 wins, 1 loss
- AFL season: 10th
- Doig Medal: Caleb Serong
- Leading goalkicker: Josh Treacy (45)
- Highest home attendance: 56,536
- Lowest home attendance: 40,604
- Average home attendance: 46,950

The 2024 Fremantle Football Club season was the club's 30th season of senior competition in the Australian Football League (AFL).

== Overview ==
Fremantle's 2024 season overview
Captain	Coach	Home ground	W–L–D	Ladder	Finals	Best and fairest	Leading goalkicker	Refs
Alex Pearce	Justin Longmuir	Optus Stadium	12-10-1	10th	–	Caleb Serong	Josh Treacy (45)	

== Squad ==
Players are listed by guernsey number, and 2024 statistics are for AFL regular season and finals series matches during the 2024 AFL season only. Career statistics include a player's complete AFL career, which, as a result, means that a player's debut and part or whole of their career statistics may be for another club. Statistics are correct as of round 24, 2024 and are taken from AFL Tables.

No.	Name	AFL debut	Games (2024)	Goals (2024)	Games (Fremantle)	Goals (Fremantle)	Games (AFL career)	Goals (AFL career)
1	Sam Sturt	2020	13	21	31	43	31	43
2	Jaeger O'Meara	2013 (Gold Coast)	22	8	43	15	186	85
3	Caleb Serong (vc)	2020	23	11	103	30	103	30
4	Sean Darcy	2017	12	6	110	44	110	44
5	Heath Chapman	2021	16	1	42	2	42	2
6	Jordan Clark	2019 (Geelong)	23	3	70	7	102	22
7	Nat Fyfe	2010	22	5	240	178	240	178
8	Andrew Brayshaw (vc)	2018	23	7	146	50	146	50
9	Luke Jackson	2020 (Melbourne)	23	21	46	43	98	73
10	Michael Walters	2009	17	17	239	365	239	365
11	James Aish	2014 (Brisbane)	20	0	101	10	183	33
12	Hugh Davies	2024	2	0	2	0	2	0
13	Luke Ryan	2017	23	0	155	3	155	3
14	Jeremy Sharp	2020 (Gold Coast)	23	10	23	10	46	17
15	Ethan Hughes	2015	6	0	107	6	107	6
17	Will Brodie	2017 (Gold Coast)	0	0	29	7	54	10
18	Tom Emmett	2023	13	7	15	11	15	11
19	Josh Corbett	2019 (Gold Coast)	0	0	5	3	41	36
20	Matt Taberner	2012	5	6	125	173	125	173
21	Oscar McDonald	2015 (Melbourne)	1	0	1	0	87	3
22	Max Knobel	****	0	0	0	0	0	0
23	Karl Worner	2023	4	0	8	0	8	0
24	Jye Amiss	2022	22	36	47	81	47	81
25	Alex Pearce (c)	2015	15	1	122	5	122	5
26	Hayden Young	2020	23	13	80	15	80	15
27	Odin Jones	****	0	0	0	0	0	0
28	Neil Erasmus	2022	4	0	23	2	23	2
29	Cooper Simpson	2024	2	0	2	0	2	0
30	Nathan O'Driscoll	2022	2	0	24	11	24	11
31	Brandon Walker	2021	19	1	64	2	64	2
32	Michael Frederick	2020	21	23	78	86	78	86
33	Ollie Murphy	****	0	0	0	0	0	0
34	Corey Wagner	2016 (North Melbourne)	12	0	21	0	40	6
35	Josh Treacy	2021	20	45	56	74	56	74
36	Brennan Cox	2017	9	1	111	31	111	31
37	Josh Draper	2024	20	0	20	0	20	0
38	Patrick Voss	2024	7	7	7	7	7	7
39	Sam Switkowski	2018	20	12	88	55	88	55
40	Jack Delean	****	0	0	0	0	0	0
41	Bailey Banfield	2018	22	20	97	62	97	62
42	Liam Reidy	2024	2	0	2	0	2	0
43	Sebit Kuek	****	0	0	0	0	0	0
44	Matthew Johnson	2023	19	3	37	7	37	7
45	Conrad Williams	****	0	0	0	0	0	0
46	Ethan Stanley	2023	0	0	2	0	2	0

=== Squad changes ===
==== In ====
No.	Name	Position	Previous club	via
14	(Western Australia) Jeremy Sharp	Midfielder	Gold Coast	pre-season supplemental selection
21	(Victoria (state)) Oscar McDonald	Key Defender	Williamstown	delisted free agent
27	(Western Australia) Odin Jones	Key Forward, Ruckman	West Perth	draft
29	(Victoria (state)) Cooper Simpson	Midfielder, Forward	Dandenong Stingrays	draft
33	(Victoria (state)) Ollie Murphy	Key Defender	Sandringham Dragons	draft
38	(Victoria (state)) Patrick Voss	Key Forward	Oakleigh Chargers	pre-season supplemental selection
40	(South Australia) Jack Delean	Small Forward	South Adelaide	draft

==== Out ====
No.	Name	Position	New Club	via
5	(Victoria (state)) Lachie Schultz	Forward	Collingwood	trade
14	(Western Australia) Nathan Wilson	Defender	Peel Thunder	delisted
23	(Western Australia) Liam Henry	Forward, Winger	St Kilda	trade
33	(Western Australia) Travis Colyer	Winger	-	delisted
38	(Western Australia) Eric Benning	Ruckman	Claremont	delisted

Due to Josh Corbett and Sebit Kuek being placed on the long term injury list, Fremantle had two available positions to be filled either in the pre-season supplemental selection period or the mid-year rookie draft. Patrick Voss, Max Beatty, Sam van Rooyen and Daniel McKenzie all trained with Fremantle during the pre-season in an attempt to be listed. In the end Patrick Voss was selected with Fremantle's final spot on the list.

== Season ==
=== Pre Season ===
Fremantle's 2024 AAMI Community Series fixtures
Date and local time	Opponent	Scores			Venue	Ref
Date and local time	Opponent	Home	Away	Result	Venue	Ref
Friday, 1 March (5:00 pm)	Port Adelaide	13.14.92	8.5.53	Lost by 39 points	Alberton Oval	

=== Home & Away Season ===
Fremantle's 2024 AFL season fixture
Round	Date and local time	Opponent	Scores			Venue	Attendance	Ladder position	Ref
Round	Date and local time	Opponent	Home	Away	Result	Venue	Attendance	Ladder position	Ref
1	Sunday, 17 March (3:50 pm)	Brisbane Lions	14.9 (93)	10.10 (70)	Won by 23 points	Optus Stadium [H]	40,604	6th ▲	
2	Saturday, 23 March (1:45 pm)	North Melbourne	11.10 (76)	15.12 (102)	Won by 26 points	Marvel Stadium [A]	17,589	5th ▲	
3	Friday, 29 March (4:30 pm)	Adelaide	9.15 (69)	4.10 (34)	Won by 35 points	Optus Stadium [H]	51,037	2nd ▲	
4	Saturday, 6 April (2:50 pm)	Carlton	9.9 (63)	10.13 (73)	Lost by 10 points	Adelaide Oval [H]	47,395	7th ▼	
5	Saturday, 13 April (7:00 pm)	Port Adelaide	9.12 (66)	9.9 (63)	Lost by 3 points	Adelaide Oval [A]	35,658	7th	
6	Saturday, 20 April (6:10 pm)	West Coast	16.9 (105)	10.8 (68)	Lost by 37 points	Optus Stadium [A]	54,473	9th ▼	
7	Saturday, 27 April (5:30 pm)	Western Bulldogs	14.11 (95)	10.11 (71)	Won by 24 points	Optus Stadium [H]	45,931	8th ▲	
8	Sunday, 5 May (1:00 pm)	Richmond	6.13 (49)	15.13 (103)	Won by 54 points	MCG [A]	32,252	6th ▲	
9	Friday, 10 May (6:20 pm)	Sydney	4.15 (39)	13.9 (87)	Lost by 48 points	Optus Stadium [H]	46,198	9th ▼	
10	Saturday, 18 May (7:30 pm)	St Kilda	8.7 (55)	9.18 (72)	Won by 17 points	Marvel Stadium [A]	19,265	9th	
11	Friday, 24 May (6:10 pm)	Collingwood	11.9 (75)	10.15 (75)	Drew	Optus Stadium [H]	54,035	9th	
12	Sunday, 2 June (12:30 pm)	Melbourne	7.7 (49)	22.9 (141)	Won by 92 points	TIO Traeger Park [A]	6,109	6th ▲	
13	Bye							7th ▼	Bye
14	Saturday, 15 June (1:45 pm)	Western Bulldogs	23.11 (149)	12.10 (82)	Lost by 67 points	Marvel Stadium [A]	21,796	8th ▼	
15	Sunday, 23 June (2:00 pm)	Gold Coast	12.13 (85)	10.5 (65)	Won by 20 points	Optus Stadium [H]	40,637	5th ▲	
16	Saturday, 29 June (1:45 pm)	Sydney	14.14 (98)	15.9 (99)	Won by 1 point	SCG [A]	35,477	3rd ▲	
17	Saturday, 6 July (6:10 pm)	Richmond	16.9 (105)	7.12 (54)	Won by 51 points	Optus Stadium [H]	42,890	3rd	
18	Saturday, 13 July (1:45 pm)	Hawthorn	13.9 (87)	10.14 (74)	Lost by 13 points	UTAS Stadium [A]	11,146	5th ▼	
19	Sunday, 21 July (1:20 pm)	Melbourne	17.14 (116)	10.6 (66)	Won by 50 points	Optus Stadium [H]	42,215	4th ▲	
20	Saturday, 27 July (6:10 pm)	West Coast	17.8 (110)	11.9 (75)	Won by 35 points	Optus Stadium [H]	56,536	3rd ▲	
21	Sunday, 4 August (3:20 pm)	Essendon	13.12 (90)	14.5 (89)	Lost by 1 point	MCG [A]	34,381	6th ▼	
22	Saturday, 10 August (2:35 pm)	Geelong	9.8 (62)	10.13 (73)	Lost by 11 points	Optus Stadium [H]	50,600	6th	
23	Saturday 17 August, (1:45 pm)	Greater Western Sydney	15.11 (101)	14.8 (92)	Lost by 9 points	ENGIE Stadium [A]	10,801	9th ▼	
24	Sunday 25 August, (4:10 pm)	Port Adelaide	9.13 (67)	13.9 (87)	Lost by 20 points	Optus Stadium [H]	45,322	10th ▼	

- NOTE: All game times are set at the local venue time of that match.

=== Ladder ===
Pos	Team	Pld	W	L	D	PF	PA	PP	Pts	Qualification
1	Sydney	23	17	6	0	2242	1769	126.7	68	Finals series
2	Port Adelaide	23	16	7	0	2011	1752	114.8	64	Finals series
3	Geelong	23	15	8	0	2164	1928	112.2	60	Finals series
4	Greater Western Sydney	23	15	8	0	2034	1864	109.1	60	Finals series
5	Brisbane Lions (P)	23	14	8	1	2130	1747	121.9	58	Finals series
6	Western Bulldogs	23	14	9	0	2171	1736	125.1	56	Finals series
7	Hawthorn	23	14	9	0	2090	1763	118.5	56	Finals series
8	Carlton	23	13	10	0	2151	1952	110.2	52	Finals series
9	Collingwood	23	12	9	2	1991	1943	102.5	52	
10	Fremantle	23	12	10	1	1964	1755	111.9	50	
11	Essendon	23	11	11	1	1892	2024	93.5	46	
12	St Kilda	23	11	12	0	1748	1758	99.4	44	
13	Gold Coast	23	11	12	0	1925	1943	99.1	44	
14	Melbourne	23	11	12	0	1785	1812	98.5	44	
15	Adelaide	23	8	14	1	1906	1923	99.1	34	
16	West Coast	23	5	18	0	1594	2339	68.1	20	
17	North Melbourne	23	3	20	0	1619	2550	63.5	12	
18	Richmond	23	2	21	0	1505	2364	63.7	8	

Source: afl.com.au
Rules for classification: 1) points; 2) percentage; 3) number of points for
(P) Premiers
