= 2022 Fremantle Football Club season =

Fremantle Dockers
2022 season
- President: Dale Alcock
- Coach: Justin Longmuir
- Captain: Nat Fyfe
- Home ground: Optus Stadium (capacity: 61,266)
- Pre-season: 1 win, 0 losses
- AFL season: 5th
- Finals series: 1 win, 1 loss
- Doig Medal: Andrew Brayshaw
- Leading goalkicker: Rory Lobb (36)
- Highest home attendance: 58,982
- Lowest home attendance: 25,284
- Average home attendance: 42,003

The 2022 Fremantle Football Club season was the club's 28th season of senior competition in the Australian Football League (AFL).

== Overview ==
Fremantle's 2022 season overview
| Captain | Coach | Home ground | W–L–D | Ladder | Finals | Best and fairest | Leading goalkicker | Refs |
|---|---|---|---|---|---|---|---|---|
| Nat Fyfe | Justin Longmuir | Optus Stadium | 15–6–1 | 5th | Semi Final | Andrew Brayshaw | Rory Lobb | |

== Squad ==
Players are listed by guernsey number, and 2022 statistics are for AFL regular season and finals series matches during the 2022 AFL season only. Career statistics include a player's complete AFL career, which, as a result, means that a player's debut and part or whole of their career statistics may be for another club. Statistics are correct as of semi finals, 2022 and are taken from AFL Tables.

| No. | Name | AFL debut | Games (2022) | Goals (2022) | Games (Fremantle) | Goals (Fremantle) | Games (AFL career) | Goals (AFL career) |
|---|---|---|---|---|---|---|---|---|
| 1 | Sam Sturt | 2020 | 0 | 0 | 4 | 5 | 4 | 5 |
| 2 | Griffin Logue | 2017 | 20 | 8 | 64 | 9 | 64 | 9 |
| 3 | Caleb Serong | 2020 | 22 | 5 | 58 | 15 | 58 | 15 |
| 4 | Sean Darcy | 2017 | 21 | 10 | 83 | 34 | 83 | 34 |
| 5 | Lachie Schultz | 2019 | 23 | 30 | 67 | 68 | 67 | 68 |
| 6 | Jordan Clark | 2019 (Geelong) | 24 | 3 | 24 | 3 | 56 | 18 |
| 7 | Nat Fyfe (c) | 2010 | 7 | 6 | 209 | 170 | 209 | 170 |
| 8 | Andrew Brayshaw | 2018 | 24 | 12 | 100 | 32 | 100 | 32 |
| 9 | Blake Acres | 2014 (St Kilda) | 20 | 6 | 45 | 8 | 120 | 37 |
| 10 | Michael Walters | 2009 | 21 | 25 | 202 | 315 | 202 | 315 |
| 11 | James Aish | 2014 (Brisbane) | 23 | 5 | 61 | 6 | 143 | 27 |
| 12 | Mitch Crowden | 2018 | 0 | 0 | 40 | 15 | 40 | 15 |
| 13 | Luke Ryan | 2017 | 24 | 0 | 109 | 3 | 109 | 3 |
| 14 | Nathan Wilson | 2012 (Greater Western Sydney) | 2 | 0 | 70 | 2 | 151 | 18 |
| 15 | Ethan Hughes | 2015 | 6 | 0 | 81 | 4 | 81 | 4 |
| 16 | David Mundy | 2015 | 22 | 5 | 376 | 161 | 376 | 161 |
| 17 | Will Brodie | 2017 (Gold Coast) | 24 | 6 | 24 | 6 | 49 | 9 |
| 18 | Darcy Tucker | 2016 | 14 | 2 | 108 | 35 | 108 | 35 |
| 19 | Connor Blakely | 2015 | 0 | 0 | 78 | 3 | 78 | 3 |
| 20 | Matt Taberner | 2012 | 13 | 23 | 116 | 164 | 116 | 164 |
| 21 | Joel Hamling | 2015 (Western Bulldogs) | 1 | 0 | 64 | 0 | 87 | 0 |
| 22 | Lloyd Meek | 2021 | 6 | 2 | 15 | 3 | 15 | 3 |
| 23 | Liam Henry | 2020 | 7 | 1 | 27 | 12 | 27 | 12 |
| 24 | Jye Amiss | 2022 | 3 | 4 | 3 | 4 | 3 | 4 |
| 25 | Alex Pearce | 2015 | 21 | 1 | 84 | 4 | 84 | 4 |
| 26 | Hayden Young | 2020 | 22 | 1 | 35 | 1 | 35 | 1 |
| 27 | Heath Chapman | 2021 | 17 | 0 | 23 | 1 | 23 | 1 |
| 28 | Neil Erasmus | 2022 | 5 | 1 | 5 | 1 | 5 | 1 |
| 29 | Luke Valente | **** | 0 | 0 | 0 | 0 | 0 | 0 |
| 30 | Nathan O'Driscoll | 2022 | 12 | 10 | 12 | 10 | 12 | 10 |
| 31 | Brandon Walker | 2021 | 21 | 1 | 31 | 1 | 31 | 1 |
| 32 | Michael Frederick | 2020 | 22 | 28 | 39 | 37 | 39 | 37 |
| 33 | Travis Colyer | 2010 (Essendon) | 18 | 9 | 59 | 32 | 146 | 86 |
| 34 | Joel Western | 2021 | 0 | 0 | 4 | 0 | 4 | 0 |
| 35 | Josh Treacy | 2021 | 4 | 1 | 19 | 14 | 19 | 14 |
| 36 | Brennan Cox | 2017 | 23 | 1 | 82 | 28 | 82 | 28 |
| 37 | Rory Lobb | 2014 (Greater Western Sydney) | 21 | 36 | 66 | 79 | 140 | 143 |
| 38 | Eric Benning | **** | 0 | 0 | 0 | 0 | 0 | 0 |
| 39 | Sam Switkowski | 2018 | 14 | 11 | 46 | 27 | 46 | 27 |
| 40 | Karl Worner | **** | 0 | 0 | 0 | 0 | 0 | 0 |
| 41 | Bailey Banfield | 2018 | 23 | 18 | 61 | 31 | 61 | 31 |
| 43 | Sebit Kuek | **** | 0 | 0 | 0 | 0 | 0 | 0 |
| 44 | Matthew Johnson | **** | 0 | 0 | 0 | 0 | 0 | 0 |

=== Ladder ===
| Pos | Team | Pld | W | L | D | PF | PA | PP | Pts | Qualification |
|---|---|---|---|---|---|---|---|---|---|---|
| 1 | Geelong (P) | 22 | 18 | 4 | 0 | 2146 | 1488 | 144.2 | 72 | Finals series |
| 2 | Melbourne | 22 | 16 | 6 | 0 | 1936 | 1483 | 130.5 | 64 | Finals series |
| 3 | Sydney | 22 | 16 | 6 | 0 | 2067 | 1616 | 127.9 | 64 | Finals series |
| 4 | Collingwood | 22 | 16 | 6 | 0 | 1839 | 1763 | 104.3 | 64 | Finals series |
| 5 | Fremantle | 22 | 15 | 6 | 1 | 1739 | 1486 | 117.0 | 62 | Finals series |
| 6 | Brisbane Lions | 22 | 15 | 7 | 0 | 2147 | 1799 | 119.3 | 60 | Finals series |
| 7 | Richmond | 22 | 13 | 8 | 1 | 2165 | 1780 | 121.6 | 54 | Finals series |
| 8 | Western Bulldogs | 22 | 12 | 10 | 0 | 1973 | 1812 | 108.9 | 48 | Finals series |
| 9 | Carlton | 22 | 12 | 10 | 0 | 1857 | 1714 | 108.3 | 48 | |
| 10 | St Kilda | 22 | 11 | 11 | 0 | 1703 | 1715 | 99.3 | 44 | |
| 11 | Port Adelaide | 22 | 10 | 12 | 0 | 1806 | 1638 | 110.3 | 40 | |
| 12 | Gold Coast | 22 | 10 | 12 | 0 | 1871 | 1820 | 102.8 | 40 | |
| 13 | Hawthorn | 22 | 8 | 14 | 0 | 1787 | 1991 | 89.8 | 32 | |
| 14 | Adelaide | 22 | 8 | 14 | 0 | 1721 | 1986 | 86.7 | 32 | |
| 15 | Essendon | 22 | 7 | 15 | 0 | 1737 | 2087 | 83.2 | 28 | |
| 16 | Greater Western Sydney | 22 | 6 | 16 | 0 | 1631 | 1927 | 84.6 | 24 | |
| 17 | West Coast | 22 | 2 | 20 | 0 | 1429 | 2389 | 59.8 | 8 | |
| 18 | North Melbourne | 22 | 2 | 20 | 0 | 1337 | 2397 | 55.8 | 8 | |

Source: afl.com.au
Rules for classification: 1) points; 2) percentage; 3) number of points for.
(P) Premiers
