= Wharfie Time =

Slogan used by the Fremantle Football Club

- The Wharfie Time display on the big screen at Optus Stadium during the 2024 AFL season
- Frequency: Ad hoc
- Venue: Optus Stadium (principally); Cockburn ARC (AFLW)
- Inaugurated: 6 August 2023
- Founder: Matthew Pavlich
- Most recent: 1 November 2026
- Organiser: Fremantle Football Club

Wharfie Time is a slogan used by the Fremantle Football Club in the Australian Football League (AFL). It is used by the club as a crowd activation, typically during the last quarter of selected home matches at Optus Stadium.

During the activation, big screens at the venue show a container ship crashing through waves, accompanied by the sound of a heartbeat and the tolling bell intro from the AC/DC song "Hells Bells"; this is used to rally the team and excite the crowd in the remaining minutes of a close match.

Wharfie Time was first activated late in the 2023 AFL season, with its national prominence growing substantially in 2026 when Fremantle finished minor premiers and pursued the first premiership in the club's 32-year history. At the end of the season, it became associated with the club's late collapse in the 2026 AFL Grand Final, when the team conceded four straight goals after Wharfie Time's activation to lose the premiership to the Brisbane Lions.

== Origins ==
The Fremantle Football Club was founded in 1994 to represent the port city of Fremantle, Western Australia. The club is nicknamed the Dockers in reference to Fremantle's maritime and dockworker heritage; "wharfie" is a slang term for a dockworker. A 2026 report in the Australian Financial Review dates the "wharfie time" phrase back to the club's early years in the AFL, when commentators supposedly used the term to refer to the Dockers' frequent Sunday afternoon timeslots.

=== Matthew Pavlich speech (2009) ===
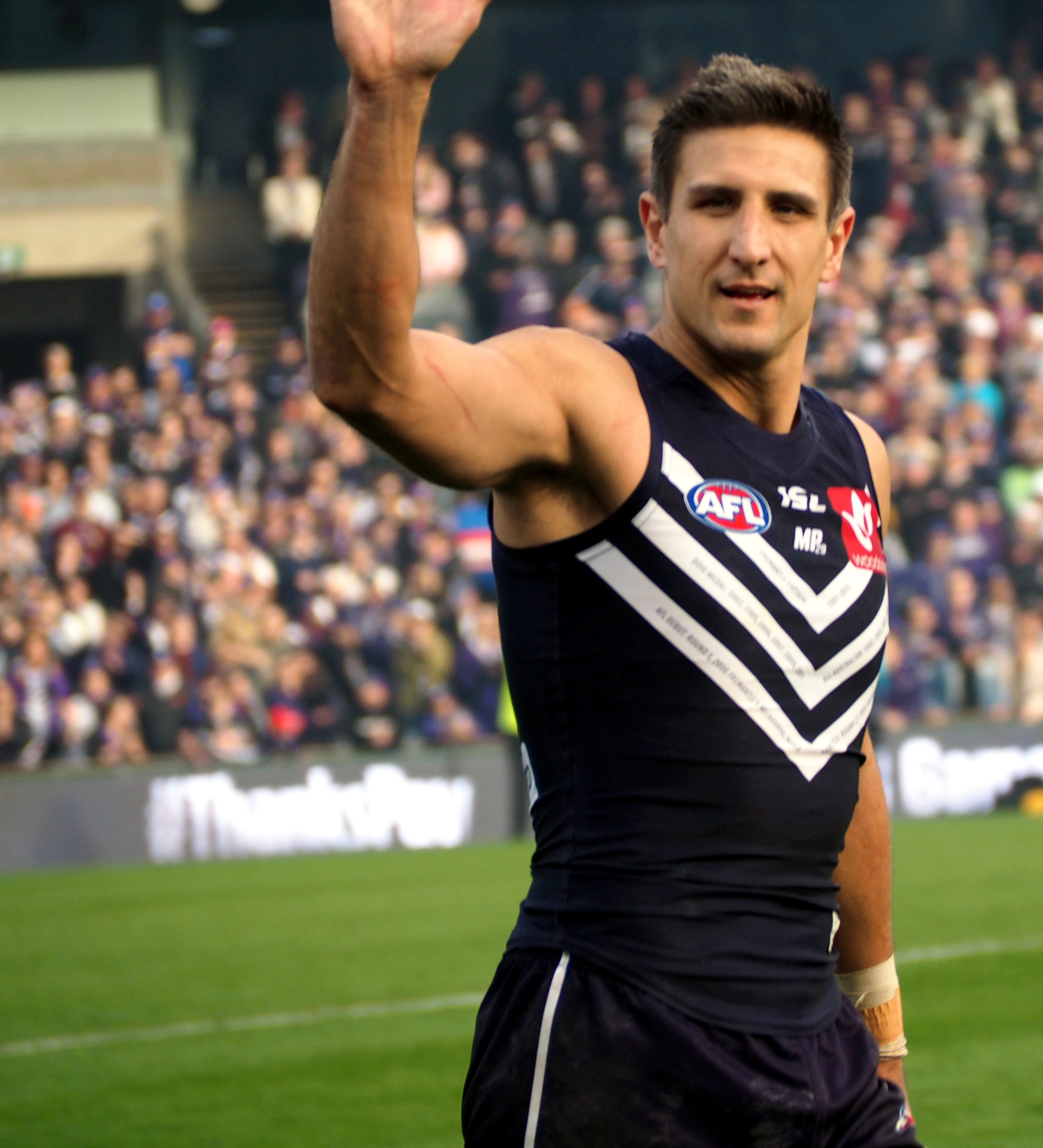
Former Fremantle player Matthew Pavlich (pictured) popularised the term "wharfie time".

It’s a part of our folklore. It's embraced by the club. It's been embraced by the Fremantle community and fans.

It’s pretty powerful. It's astonishing to think that it all came from one Friday night against Hawthorn all of those years ago in a mumble jumble pre-game speech to the players.

— Matthew Pavlich, Code Sports, 15 May 2026

The slogan first gained public visibility in round 8, 2009 during Fremantle's match against Hawthorn at Subiaco Oval. Speaking before the start of the match, while fitted with a microphone for Seven Sport's broadcast, then-Fremantle captain Matthew Pavlich told his teammates: "Hey, put on your Superman capes, boys – it's wharfie time". Fremantle lost the match by 22 points.

Quizzed by media in the week following the match as to the backstory behind the "wharfie time" concept, Pavlich's teammate Luke McPharlin was stopped by club officials from explaining its lore, but an article in The West Australian at the time said it was "understood to underpin the core values the players have committed to this season". A 2014 newspaper interview with the since-retired McPharlin and his former teammates Shaun McManus and Paul Hasleby elaborated on the meaning of the term for the first time: he noted that Pavlich's reference to Superman capes came from a speech by McManus in a team meeting two years earlier, when McManus likened pulling on an AFL club guernsey to donning a Superman cape, and that the "wharfie time" concept was a new addition based on the values and standards of the playing group. Hasleby noted that the "wharfie spirit" was manufactured in a similar fashion to the "Bloods culture" at Sydney, saying "At the time, the thinking was that wharfies and how they were hard workers was worth adopting into our values. To everybody else, it probably didn't mean much, but to the players who were kicking around in that environment, it meant a hell of a lot."

It was about getting down and getting dirty, let's get into it. It's about recognising our heritage.

— Shaun McManus, The Mercury, 17 May 2014

Vision of Pavlich's speech was later replayed on a 2016 episode of Friday Front Bar ahead of his 350th AFL game, when the hosts poked fun at the concept and struggled to explain what the phrase actually meant.

== Fan activation ==
=== Introduction in 2023 ===
A version of the Wharfie Time activation was launched for the first time during Fremantle's round 21, 2023 match against Brisbane, following a banana kick goal from Michael Frederick with 1:09 remaining that cut the margin to two points. The scoreboard displayed a purple and white wave video around Optus Stadium alongside the phrase "wharfie time". Fremantle lost by three points. The activation was the brainchild of Pavlich, who would later say that Wharfie Time became "the people's thing". Players and fans were given no warning prior to its introduction, as the club deliberately kept a veil of secrecy in a bid to grow the concept organically.

Wharfie Time appeared twice in matches in 2024. In March 2025, Fremantle uploaded a video to its Docker TV YouTube channel outlining the changes to the gameday experience at home matches for the season; at this point, the AC/DC song "Hells Bells" was introduced during both Wharfie Time and the pre-match coin toss. As it grew in both familiarity and popularity, it became associated with exciting finishes in close Fremantle home games, and featured four times in 2025.

=== 2026 season ===
When the beat gets going, you can feel your whole body vibrating. It's insane. The crowd is electric.

It certainly lifts us, and I reckon it potentially spooks the opposition because they've never experienced it before. It's a massive advantage for us.

— Hayden Young, Code Sports, 15 May 2026

In April 2026, the AFL applied to trademark the phrase. This attracted the ire of Pavlich, who said that while "the reality is the AFL is a commercial beast and they can do what they like", his view was that it was "the people's term".

Wharfie Time began to gain greater recognition outside Fremantle during the 2026, during which season Fremantle won the minor premiership and had a club-record 14-match winning streak. In round 9 against Hawthorn, Fremantle activated Wharfie Time while trailing by four points with four minutes remaining in the final quarter; the Dockers subsequently kicked three goals to win by 15 points. After the match, Hawthorn player Dylan Moore said he was unsure what Wharfie Time was until it was activated and described it as quite distracting. Thereafter, Wharfie Time became a more common topic of commentary with AFL media, commentators frequently speculating whether or not it would be used in each game. It gained further prominence in Fremantle's semi-final against Geelong, when the club activated Wharfie Time after its lead was reduced to eight points with 75 seconds remaining; Patrick Voss kicked a goal from the next centre clearance moments later and Fremantle won the match by 14 points.

==== 2026 Grand Final ====
Ahead of the 2026 AFL Grand Final against the Brisbane Lions, which was played at the Melbourne Cricket Ground, the AFL gave Fremantle permission to activate Wharfie Time, setting rules including allowing it to be played only once and only after a Fremantle goal – consistent with provisions in place since 2025 allowing grand final clubs to play fan activations after their own goals as they would for home matches.

With 4:18 remaining in the grand final, Fremantle activated Wharfie Time after Patrick Voss kicked his third goal to give the Dockers a 17-point lead, their highest lead of the match. Within the next minute of playing time, Brisbane had kicked two goals – by Charlie Cameron and Zac Bailey – to bring the margin back to five points. With just over a minute remaining, Logan Morris marked and kicked a goal to put Brisbane ahead by one point. In the final seconds of the match, Morris kicked another goal and Brisbane won by seven points. Morris had not scored any goals in the first three quarters, however kicked three in the final quarter, put down in part to the absence of Fremantle captain Alex Pearce who had been playing on him, but left the field with an achilles tendon injury during the third quarter.

Fremantle's failure in Wharfie Time in the biggest moment dominated discussion after the match, commentators criticising the decision to activate it in that moment and considering it a case of premature celebration, despite having been questioning when it would be played beforehand. Brisbane players Sam Draper and Josh Dunkley said post-match interviews the club had prepared for Wharfie Time to be used, having played the song at training during the week, and viewing the activation as a trigger to go up a notch.

In the aftermath of the match, many commentators speculated about whether Fremantle might cease to use Wharfie Time beyond 2026, due to the potential that it be associated less with fan excitement and more with the club's most heartbreaking moment. Fremantle senior coach Justin Longmuir said post-match that he would want it to continue being used in 2027. The club made no public statement one way or the other to Wharfie Time's future in the immediate aftermath, before next using it in an AFL Women's match five weeks later and shortly afterwards confirming that it would remain into 2027.

== Activation criteria ==
A May 2026 Code Sports article documenting the history of Wharfie Time surmised that the typical but non-stringent triggers for use of Wharfie Time are: once per match; deep into the final quarter; when the margin is within two goals, regardless of which team is leading; and after a goal has been scored, regardless of which team scored it. Not all activations of Wharfie Time have met all four criteria.

Exactly who within the club makes the decision to activate Wharfie Time is not publicly known. Code Sports' May 2026 article, reported that Fremantle's game day events team – led by Kellie Black and Olivia Minutillo – motioned to the scoreboard operators when to activate Wharfie Time on that occasion it was used in round 9, 2026; while in a August 2026 episode of The Agenda Setters, co-host Caroline Wilson declared that the ultimate call for when to activate Wharfie Time rested with the club's chief executive officer Simon Garlick. "He won't admit it," Wilson said. "I've quizzed him about it, he refuses to say it's him – he is the man who has the link to the scoreboard (operator)."

== List of activations ==
Between its debut in 2023 and its most recent use in the 2026 grand final, the Wharfie Time activation has been displayed on 11 occasions. Of those 11 matches, five ended in wins and five in losses, with one draw. Despite its reputation, only once did Fremantle win a game after trailing when Wharfie Time was activated.

List of Wharfie Time activations
#	Match	Opponent	Venue	Time (Note: The amount of time remaining in the fourth quarter when Wharfie Time was activated, represented by minutes and seconds.)	Goalkicker at activation	Score at activation	Margin at activation	Final score	Result	Margin change
1	Round 21, 2023	Brisbane Lions	Optus Stadium	1:09	Michael Frederick	11.8 (74) – 11.10 (76)	Behind by 2 points	11.8 (74) – 11.11 (77)	Lost by 3 points	-1
2	Round 11, 2024	Collingwood	Optus Stadium	1:49	Alex Pearce	11.8 (74) – 10.15 (75)	Behind by 1 point	11.9 (75) – 10.15 (75)	Drew	+1
3	Round 22, 2024	Geelong	Optus Stadium	1:44	N/A (During a stoppage)	9.8 (62) – 9.13 (67)	Behind by 5 points	9.8 (62) – 10.13 (73)	Lost by 11 points	-6
4	Round 9, 2025	Collingwood	Optus Stadium	11:23	Murphy Reid	11.8 (74) – 13.6 (84)	Behind by 10 points	12.11 (83) – 15.7 (97)	Lost by 14 points	-4
5	Round 16, 2025	St Kilda	Optus Stadium	0:49	Mitch Owens (St Kilda)	10.15 (75) – 9.15 (69)	Ahead by 6 points	11.15 (81) – 9.15 (69)	Won by 12 points	+6
6	Round 18, 2025	Hawthorn	Optus Stadium	6:42	Josh Treacy	12.3 (75) – 9.10 (64)	Ahead by 11 points	12.5 (77) – 9.10 (64)	Won by 13 points	+2
7	Round 21, 2025	Carlton	Optus Stadium	4:49	Isaiah Dudley	12.4 (76) – 10.6 (66)	Ahead by 10 points	15.4 (94) – 10.7 (67)	Won by 27 points	+17
8	Elimination Final, 2025	Gold Coast	Optus Stadium	7:24	Luke Jackson	11.6 (72) – 10.13 (73)	Behind by 1 point	12.7 (79) – 11.14 (80)	Lost by 1 point	0
9	Round 9, 2026	Hawthorn	Optus Stadium	4:08	Michael Frederick	9.15 (69) – 11.7 (73)	Behind by 4 points	12.16 (88) – 11.7 (73)	Won by 15 points	+19
10	Semi Final, 2026	Geelong	Optus Stadium	1:15	Tom Stewart (Geelong)	17.12 (114) – 16.10 (106)	Ahead by 8 points	18.12 (120) – 16.10 (106)	Won by 14 points	+6
11	Grand Final, 2026	Brisbane Lions	MCG	4:18	Patrick Voss	12.17 (89) – 10.12 (72)	Ahead by 17 points	12.17 (89) – 14.12 (96)	Lost by 7 points	-24

== Use by women's team ==
Fremantle's AFL Women's (AFLW) team first utilised the Wharfie Time activation in round 3, 2026. Hosting Carlton at Cockburn ARC Oval, Gabby O'Sullivan kicked a running goal with 1:32 remaining on the clock to draw the Dockers within 7 points of the Blues, 6.5 (41) to 7.6 (48) when Wharfie Time was activated. Despite numerous forays forward, the Dockers could not surpass the Blues and eventually lost, 6.6 (42) to 7.6 (48).

List of AFLW Wharfie Time activations
#	Match	Opponent	Venue	Time	Goalkicker at activation	Score at activation	Margin at activation	Final score	Result	Margin change
1	Round 3, 2026	Carlton	Cockburn ARC Oval	1:32	Gabby O'Sullivan	6.5 (41) – 7.6 (48)	Behind by 7 points	6.6 (42) – 7.6 (48)	Lost by 6 points	+1
2	Round 12, 2026	Sydney	Cockburn ARC Oval	1:26	Hayley Miller	5.6 (36) – 5.7 (37)	Behind by 1 point	5.6 (36) – 5.7 (37)	Lost by 1 point	0
