= Switkowski =

Switkowski or Świtkowski, feminine: Świtkowska is a Polish surname. It is a toponymic surname derived from any of place named Świtkowo. Notable people with the name include:

- Jan Świtkowski (born 1994), Polish professional swimmer
- Sam Switkowski (born 1996), Australian rules footballer for Fremantle
- Ziggy Switkowski (born 1948), Polish-Australian business executive and nuclear physicist
