= Corey Wagner =

Australian rules footballer (born 1997)

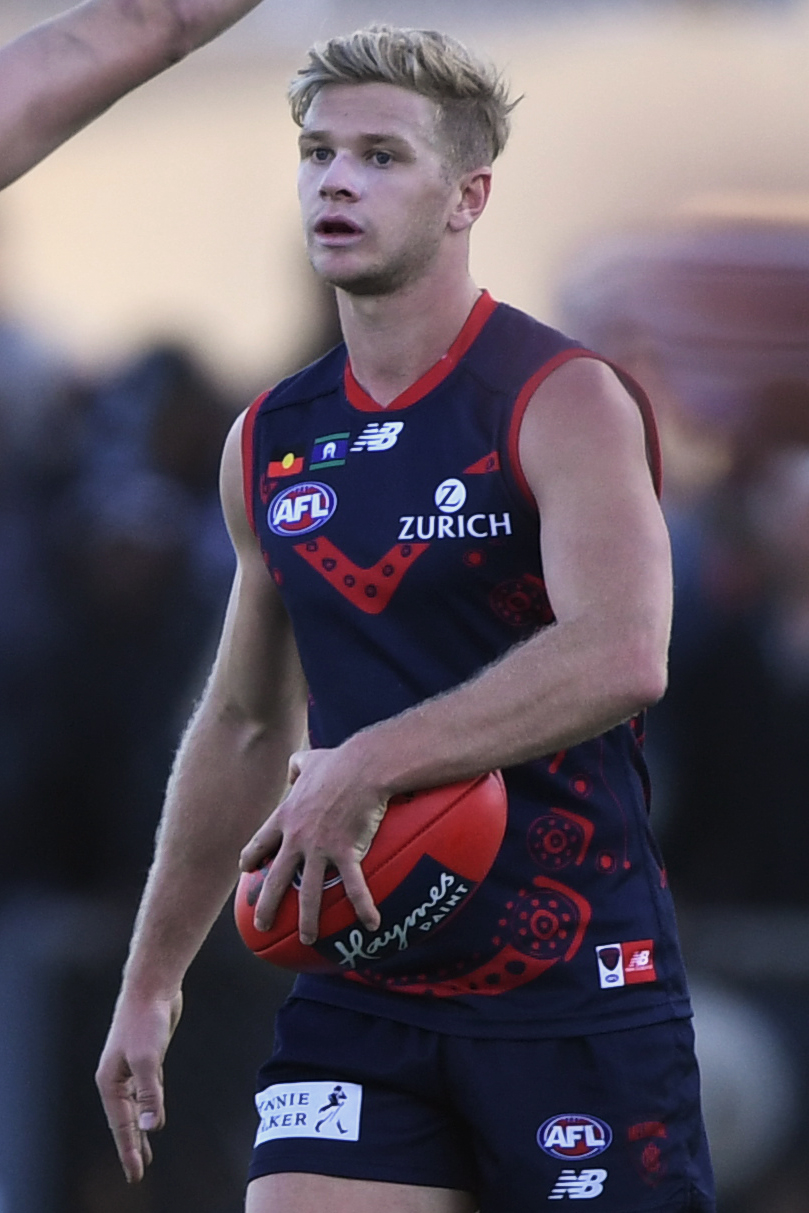
- Wagner playing for Melbourne in July 2019

Personal information
- Full name: Corey Wagner
- Born: 23 March 1997 (age 29)
- Original team: Aspley (NEAFL)/Brisbane Lions Academy
- Draft: No. 41, 2015 national draft and No. 57, 2022 national draft
- Debut: Round 13, 2016, North Melbourne vs. Hawthorn, at Etihad Stadium
- Height: 180 cm (5 ft 11 in)
- Weight: 74 kg (163 lb)
- Positions: Midfielder, Half Back

Club information
- Current club: Fremantle
- Number: 34

Playing career^{1}
Years	Club	Games (Goals)
2016–2017	North Melbourne	8 (0)
2019–2020	Melbourne	11 (6)
2023–	Fremantle	54 (3)
Total		73 (9)
- ^{1} Playing statistics correct to the end of the 2026 season.

Corey Wagner (born 23 March 1997) is a professional Australian rules footballer who plays for the Fremantle Football Club, having previously played for North Melbourne and Melbourne in the Australian Football League (AFL). He is the younger brother of former Melbourne defender, Josh Wagner.

== Early life ==
Wagner was born into a family with a strong history in Australian rules football in Queensland, with his father, Scott Wagner, a 200-gamer for the Sandgate Football Club and he was the inaugural captain of the Brisbane Bears development side, and his grandfathers, Gary Wagner and Col "Skinny" Robinson, played in premiership sides for Sandgate, along with Gary being a member of AFL Queensland's Hall of Fame.

== AFL career ==
=== North Melbourne: (2016–2017) ===
He was drafted by the North Melbourne Football Club with their fourth selection and forty-first overall in the 2015 national draft. He made his debut in the nine point loss against Hawthorn in round 13, 2016 at Etihad Stadium.

Wagner was delisted at the conclusion of the 2017 AFL season.

=== Melbourne: (2019–2020) ===
Ahead of the 2019 season, Wagner joined Melbourne during the newly implemented pre-season supplemental selection period. He spent 2018 playing for Casey Demons in the VFL.

Wagner was delisted by Melbourne at the end of the 2020 AFL season.

=== Fremantle: (2023–) ===
==== 2023 season ====
Wagner was drafted with the 57th pick in the 2022 AFL draft by Fremantle after performing well for Port Melbourne in the Victorian Football League. Wagner played his first game for Fremantle in Round 5 of the 2023 AFL season, against the Gold Coast Suns at Norwood Oval. He collected 12 disposals on debut for the Dockers in a 10 point victory. Despite collecting 18 disposals the following week against the Western Bulldogs, Wagner couldn't regain his spot in the Fremantle senior side. He instead played for their WAFL affiliate, Peel Thunder. He returned to the Dockers line-up in round eighteen against Collingwood, and played out the remainder of the season.

==== 2024 season ====
Wagner suffered a calf injury during a pre-season WAFL practice match in early March 2024. He played his first game of the 2024 AFL season in round 11 against Collingwood, replacing Josh Draper in the third quarter. Wagner played well collecting eight disposals and helping in a tight contest. He signed a two-year contract extension in late July to remain at Fremantle until at least the end of 2026.

==== 2025 season ====
Wagner started the season strong with 24 disposals in Round 1 and 20 disposals in Round 2. However, Wagner was a late out for Fremantle's Round 3 clash with cross town rivals West Coast after he pulled up with a sore calf from Round 2. Wagner returned in Round 4 however, was subbed out of the game during the 3rd quarter with calf awareness. Wagner returned to the AFL in Round 7 after missing the last two weeks with that calf injury. Wagner played well in round 11 in a big win for the Dockers against Gold Coast where he had 18 disposals and kicked his first goal for the club. After the bye Wagner continued on his good form by kicking another goal in Fremantle's 6 point win over North Melbourne in North's WA home game at Optus Stadium, in Round 17 he collected 22 disposals and kicked another goal in a close loss to Sydney, and the following week he racked up 18 touches in a big win against fellow finals contender Hawthorn. Wagner was again on the injury list after Round 19 due to a heel bruising. Wagner played a game in the WAFL before returning to the AFL team ahead of Fremantle's game against Brisbane Lions in round 23. Unfortunately, Wagner injured his pec during the final game of the home and away season. This caused him to miss Fremantle's finals campaign.

==== 2026 season ====
In June, Wagner signed a two-year contract extension, keeping him at Fremantle until at least the end of 2028.

== Statistics ==
Updated to the end of round 22, 2026.

Legend
G	Goals	K	Kicks	D	Disposals	T	Tackles
B	Behinds	H	Handballs	M	Marks

Season	Team	No.	Games	Totals							Averages (per game)							Votes
Season	Team	No.	Games	G	B	K	H	D	M	T	G	B	K	H	D	M	T	Votes
2016	North Melbourne	41	4	0	1	14	14	28	6	16	0.0	0.3	3.5	3.5	7.0	1.5	4.0	0
2017	North Melbourne	41	4	0	2	18	13	31	6	6	0.0	0.5	4.5	3.3	7.8	1.5	1.5	0
2019	Melbourne	40	11	6	5	72	50	122	27	45	0.5	0.5	6.5	4.5	11.1	2.5	4.1	0
2020 (Note: The 2020 season was played with 17 home-and-away matches per team (down from 22) and 16-minute quarters with time on (down from 20-minute quarters with time on) due to the impact of the COVID-19 pandemic.)	Melbourne	40	0	—	—	—	—	—	—	—	—	—	—	—	—	—	—	0
2023	Fremantle	34	9	0	0	110	47	157	41	31	0.0	0.0	12.2	5.2	17.4	4.6	3.4	0
2024	Fremantle	34	12	0	0	132	59	191	48	20	0.0	0.0	11.0	4.9	15.9	4.0	1.7	0
2025	Fremantle	34	17	3	1	161	87	248	45	75	0.2	0.1	9.5	5.1	14.6	2.6	4.4	0
2026	Fremantle	34	13	0	4	144	87	231	45	31	0.0	0.3	11.1	6.7	17.8	3.5	2.4	0
Career			70	9	13	651	357	1008	218	224	0.1	0.2	9.3	5.1	14.4	3.1	3.2	0
