= Cooper Simpson =

Australian rules footballer

Personal information
- Full name: Cooper Simpson
- Born: 13 February 2005 (age 21)
- Original team: Dandenong Stingrays (TAC Cup)
- Draft: No. 35, 2023 National draft, Fremantle
- Height: 182 cm (6 ft 0 in)
- Weight: 79 kg (174 lb)
- Position: Midfielder/Defender

Club information
- Current club: Fremantle
- Number: 29

Playing career^{1}
| Years | Club | Games (Goals) |
| 2024– | Fremantle | 5 (1) |
- ^{1} Playing statistics correct to the end of the 2025 season.

Career highlights
- 2x West Australian Football League premiership player: 2024, 2026

Cooper Simpson (born 13 February 2005) is an Australian rules footballer who plays for the Fremantle Football Club in the Australian Football League (AFL).

== Early life and career ==
Originally from Mount Martha on the Mornington Peninsula, Simpson was drafted by Fremantle with the 35th selection in the 2023 AFL draft from the Dandenong Stingrays in the Talent League, where he was a co-captain. After winning the Stingray's best and fairest award as a 17-year-old in 2022, his 2023 season was initially affected by glandular fever and then again when he suffered a bad cork in his leg in his opening game for Victoria Country at the 2023 AFL National Under 18 Championships.

== AFL career ==
=== 2024–2025: Early career ===
Simpson made his AFL debut for Fremantle in round 7 of the 2024 AFL season at Perth Stadium against the Western Bulldogs. Simpson started as the substitute but came into the game after quarter time for teammate Josh Draper, who suffered a hamstring injury. Simpson maintained his spot for the following week's clash versus Richmond, this time making the starting 22. Simpson was replaced by Sam Switkowski ahead of Round 9 and didn't return to the AFL line up for the rest of the season.

Simpson played his first game of 2025 for the senior team in Round 9 having 18 disposals. This resulted in him retaining his spot for the following week's clash against the Greater Western Sydney Giants where he kicked his first AFL goal and continued his good form collecting 14 disposals. Unfortunately, 8 minutes into the match next week Simpson suffered an AC joint injury. This caused Simpson to be sidelined for 2 months and turned out to be his final appearance in purple for the year.

=== =WAFL Statistics ===
Updated to the end of the 2025 season.

Legend
| G | Goals | K | Kicks | D | Disposals | T | Tackles |
| B | Behinds | H | Handballs | M | Marks |

| Season | Team | No. | Games | Totals | | | | | | | Averages (per game) | | | | | | |
| Season | Team | No. | Games | G | B | K | H | D | M | T | G | B | K | H | D | M | T |
|---|---|---|---|---|---|---|---|---|---|---|---|---|---|---|---|---|---|
| 2024 | Peel Thunder | 15/32/35 | 18 | 16 | 12 | 109 | 72 | 181 | 35 | 69 | 0.9 | 0.7 | 6.1 | 4.0 | 10.1 | 1.9 | 3.8 |
| 2025 | Peel Thunder | 29/41/88 | 10 | 0 | 2 | 137 | 52 | 189 | 33 | 16 | 0.0 | 0.2 | 13.7 | 5.2 | 18.9 | 3.3 | 1.6 |
| Career | | | 28 | 16 | 14 | 245 | 124 | 369 | 68 | 83 | 0.6 | 0.5 | 8.8 | 4.4 | 13.2 | 2.4 | 3.0 |

== Statistics ==
Updated to the end of the 2025 season.

Legend
| G | Goals | K | Kicks | D | Disposals | T | Tackles |
| B | Behinds | H | Handballs | M | Marks |

| Season | Team | No. | Games | Totals | | | | | | | Averages (per game) | | | | | | | Votes |
| Season | Team | No. | Games | G | B | K | H | D | M | T | G | B | K | H | D | M | T | Votes |
|---|---|---|---|---|---|---|---|---|---|---|---|---|---|---|---|---|---|---|
| 2024 | Fremantle | 29 | 2 | 0 | 0 | 8 | 3 | 11 | 4 | 2 | 0.0 | 0.0 | 4.0 | 1.5 | 5.5 | 2.0 | 1.0 | 0 |
| 2025 | Fremantle | 29 | 3 | 1 | 0 | 22 | 10 | 32 | 8 | 3 | 0.3 | 0.0 | 7.3 | 3.3 | 10.7 | 2.7 | 1.0 | 0 |
| Career | | | 5 | 1 | 0 | 30 | 13 | 43 | 12 | 5 | 0.2 | 0.0 | 6.0 | 2.6 | 8.6 | 2.4 | 1.0 | 0 |
