= Code Sports =

Australian sports news subscription website

- Website type: Sports news; Opinion
- Available in: English
- Headquarters: Sydney, New South Wales, Australia
- Owner: News Corp Australia
- Editor: Eliza Sewell
- Website: www.codesports.com.au
- Launched: 2021; 5 years ago
- Current status: Active

Code Sports, stylised as CODE, is an Australian sports news subscription website owned by News Corp Australia, launched in 2021.

== History ==
Code Sport was established in late 2021 by News Corp, as a sports-focused revenue-raising outlet similar to the successful The New York Times' subscription website, The Athletic.

Code Sports editors
Editor	Tenure
Alex Brown	2021 – May 2024
Heath Kelly	2024–Unknown
Eliza Sewell	March 2025 – present

The founding editor was Alex Brown, who remained in the position until May 2024, when Heath Kelly was appointed as successor.

== Description ==
The website's primary scope of coverage is Australian rules football (AFL, AFL Women's), rugby league (NRL, NRL Women's Premiership), and cricket (Australian cricket team, Big Bash League), with additional coverage given to basketball, netball, and rugby union.

== Readership ==
In the month of April 2023, Code Sports was reported to have 48,000 readers in Western Australia, ranking it the 133rd news brand in the state.

== News stories ==
In 2025, Code Sports, in collaboration with other News Corp Australia publications The Daily Telegraph and The Courier-Mail, published a series of articles collectively titled "The Deal Makers", which reported on a survey of 50 player agents about major issues in rugby league, including recreational drug use. In the survey, 62% of agents said drug use was a problem among players. The reporting sparked heated phone calls between NRL chairman Peter V'landys and senior executives at News Corp Australia. According to anonymous sources, V'landys objected to how the survey question was framed, arguing it made the NRL appear to have a widespread drug problem. In response, senior executives and editors at News Corp Australia declined an offer of NRL hospitality at a 2025 State of Origin match in Brisbane.

In February 2026, Code Sports reported that the State of Origin series, the long-held rugby league series that is played between the Australian state teams of New South Wales and Queensland, could be held in Auckland, New Zealand, in 2027 for the first time following an alleged deal between the New Zealand Government and the Australian Rugby League Commission (ARLC). The news was later picked up by New Zealand media, such as The New Zealand Herald, and the Otago Daily Times. The NRL confirmed the report ten days later.

== Awards ==
- Harry Gordon Sports Journalist of The Year Award: Linda Pearce (2023)
- AFL Media Awards: Eliza Reilly (2025)
- WA Football Media Guild Awards: Eliza Reilly (2025)
- AFL Vic Media Awards: Paul Amy (2025)

== See also ==
- Mass media in Australia
- Journalism in Australia
