= Patrick Voss =

Australian rules football player

Personal information
- Full name: Patrick Voss
- Nickname: The Prancing Pony
- Born: 29 June 2003 (age 23)
- Original team: Oakleigh Chargers (Talent League)/Turvey Park FNC (NSW)
- Draft: No. 11, 2022 rookie draft 2024 Pre-season supplemental selection period
- Debut: Round 7, 2024, Fremantle vs. Western Bulldogs, at Optus Stadium, Perth
- Height: 195 cm (6 ft 5 in)
- Weight: 90 kg (198 lb)
- Position: Key forward

Club information
- Current club: Fremantle
- Number: 20

Playing career^{1}
Years	Club	Games (Goals)
2022–2023	Essendon	0 (0)
2024–	Fremantle	53 (93)
Total		53 (93)
- ^{1} Playing statistics correct to the end of the 2026.

Career highlights
- WAFL premiership player: 2024; Fremantle Best Clubman Award: 2025

Patrick Voss (born 29 June 2003) is an Australian rules footballer who plays with the Fremantle Football Club in the Australian Football League (AFL).

== Early career ==
Voss grew up in the Riverina region of New South Wales and played for the Turvey Park Bulldogs in Wagga Wagga, which enabled him to join the Greater Western Sydney Giants junior academy program. He later went to boarding school in Melbourne, where he attended Wesley College and played for the Oakleigh Chargers in the Under 18's Talent League.

== AFL career ==
=== Essendon (2022–2023) ===
After being overlooked by GWS who had the rights to draft Voss via the academy rules, he was drafted by Essendon with the ninth selection in the 2022 rookie draft. He spent two years at Essendon, but did not make his AFL debut before being delisted at the end of the 2023 AFL season, despite winning their VFL team's best and fairest award and being their leading goal kicker.

=== Fremantle (2024–) ===
==== 2024 season ====
Voss was one of four players invited to train with Fremantle before the 2024 AFL season. He was eventually successful in being selected during the pre-season supplemental selection period. In late April he was picked to play his first AFL game against the Western Bulldogs in round 7 of the 2024 AFL season. He achieved the rare feat of kicking a goal with his first kick. Voss signed a two-year contract extension at the season's end, to remain at Fremantle until at least 2026.

==== 2025 season ====
Voss had a strong start to his second year at Fremantle, playing 4 out of the first 5 games, competing in the forward line and as a second ruck. He collected 10 disposals, 9 hit-outs and kicked a goal in round five against Richmond, which was played at Lyndoch Recreation Park in Adelaide, as part of the AFL's annual Gather Round. Voss received a three-match suspension after the game for striking Richmond player Nick Vlastuin during a tackle.

He made his return for the Dockers in round nine against Collingwood at Optus Stadium, kicking two goals during the match. In Round 19 against Collingwood at the MCG, Voss had a career-best performance. He was matched up on Collingwood captain Darcy Moore for most of the game, outplaying the Pies' skipper with a six-goal effort in Fremantle's one-point win. He kicked nine goals across the next three weeks to continue his run of strong form. Voss finished his second season at the Dockers with 37 goals from 20 games, which placed him second in the club's leading goalkicker award, only behind Josh Treacy.

In December, Voss signed a four-year contract extension, keeping him at Fremantle until at least the end of 2030.

==== 2026 season ====
In Round 2 against Melbourne, Voss was fined $1000 for taunting Melbourne's Harrison Petty.

== Statistics ==
Updated to the end of round 22, 2026.

Legend
G	Goals	K	Kicks	D	Disposals	T	Tackles
B	Behinds	H	Handballs	M	Marks	H/O	Hit-outs

Season	Team	No.	Games	Totals								Averages (per game)								Votes
Season	Team	No.	Games	G	B	K	H	D	M	T	H/O	G	B	K	H	D	M	T	H/O	Votes
2022	Essendon	39	0	—	—	—	—	—	—	—	—	—	—	—	—	—	—	—	—	0
2023	Essendon	39	0	—	—	—	—	—	—	—	—	—	—	—	—	—	—	—	—	0
2024	Fremantle	38	7	7	11	32	24	56	24	10	3	1.0	1.6	4.6	3.4	8.0	3.4	1.4	0.4	0
2025	Fremantle	20	20	37	23	126	68	194	65	44	32	1.9	1.2	6.3	3.4	9.7	3.3	2.2	1.6	3
2026	Fremantle	20	20	39	28	149	74	223	85	61	0	2.0	1.4	7.5	3.7	11.2	4.3	3.1	0.0	0
Career			47	83	62	307	166	473	174	115	35	1.8	1.3	6.5	3.5	10.1	3.7	2.4	0.7	3
