= Bailey Banfield =

Australian rules footballer (born 1998)

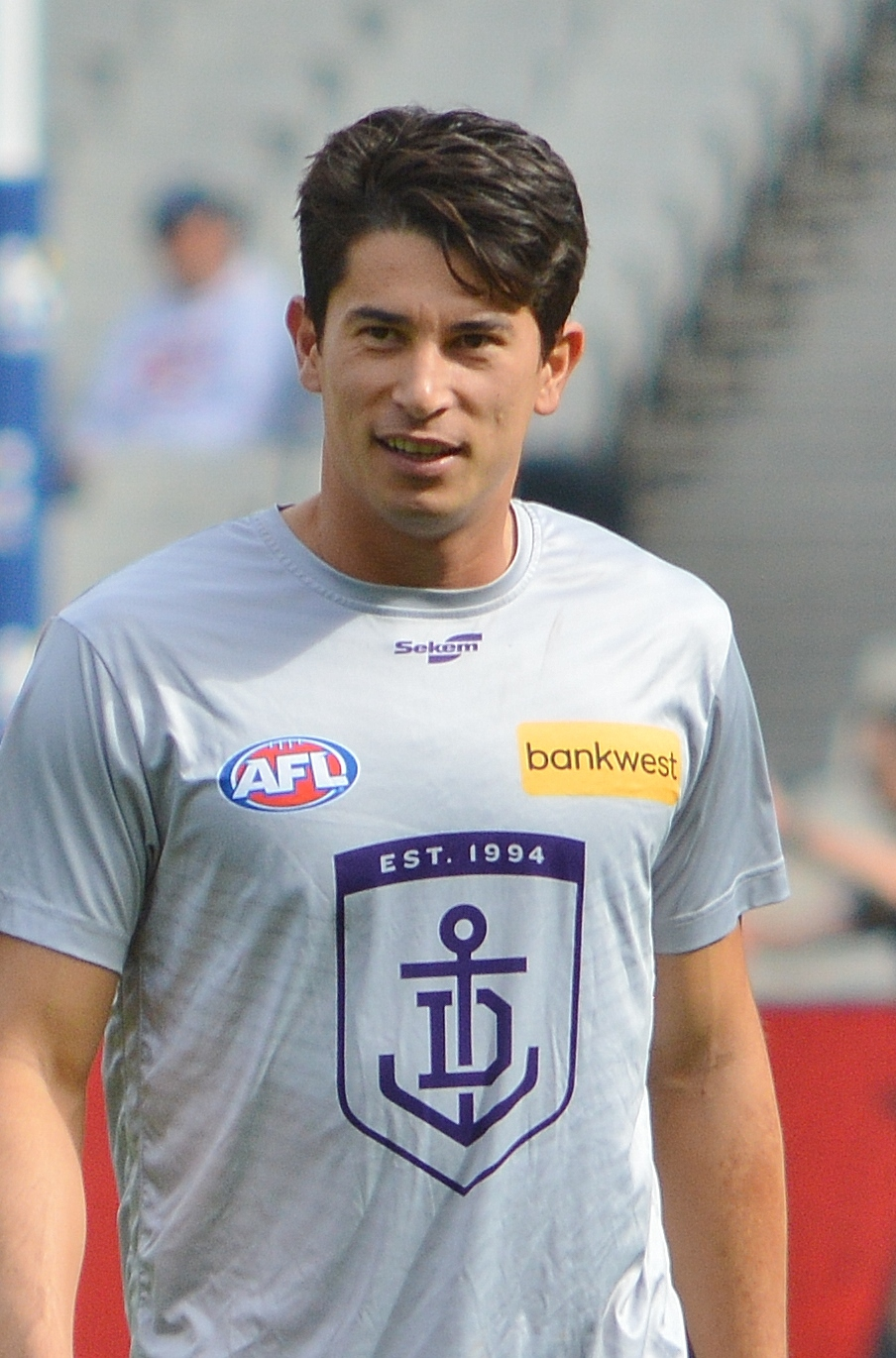
- Banfield in April 2025

Personal information
- Full name: Bailey James Banfield
- Nickname: Banners
- Born: 26 February 1998 (age 28); Broome, Western Australia
- Original team: Claremont (WAFL)
- Draft: No. 5, 2018 rookie draft
- Height: 190 cm (6 ft 3 in)
- Weight: 92 kg (203 lb)
- Positions: Midfielder, half-forward, half-back

Club information
- Current club: Essendon
- Number: 41

Playing career^{1}
Years	Club	Games (Goals)
2018–2026	Fremantle	119 (66)
- ^{1} Playing statistics correct to the end of the 2026 season.

Career highlights
- Claremont best and fairest 2017; Peel Thunder best and fairest 2019; West Australian Football League premiership player: 2026; Jim Stynes Community Leadership Award: 2026

Bailey James Banfield (born 26 February 1998) is a professional Australian rules footballer who played for the Fremantle Football Club in the Australian Football League (AFL) from 2018 to 2026.

== Early life ==
Banfield grew up in Broome, Western Australia. He lived there until he finished Year 7 before moving to Perth to attend senior schooling at Scotch College.

== AFL career ==
Overlooked in the 2016 AFL draft, Banfield played for Claremont in the West Australian Football League (WAFL), being a part of the Colts (WAFL) premiership side in 2015 and winning their 2017 best and fairest award. He finished with 22 WAFL games for Claremont. He was then selected by Fremantle with their first selection, fifth overall, in the 2018 AFL rookie draft. Banfield made his AFL debut for Fremantle in the opening round of the 2018 AFL season after a series of impressive pre-season games. He signed a two-year contract extension during the season, tying him to Fremantle until 2020.

Banfield was elevated to Fremantle's senior list in 2019. Banfield had a standout performance in Round 12 of the 2022 AFL season, kicking a career-high four goals during Fremantle's 14-point win over the Brisbane Lions.

The 2024 AFL season would prove to be a career-best for Banfield, playing 22 games. He was named on the interchange bench for Fremantle's opening game against the Brisbane Lions, kicking Fremantle's first goal and collecting 14 disposals in the 23-point come-from-behind win. He was again impactful the next week against North Melbourne at Marvel Stadium, collecting 18 disposals and kicking two goals. His fine form throughout the season saw him ranked above average in almost every statistic. As of April 18, he was ranked the third-best wingman in the league by Champion Data, despite primarily playing as a high half-forward. After attracting interest from several Melbourne-based clubs due to entering 2024 as an unrestricted free agent, Banfield signed a two-year contract extension in September to remain at the Dockers until at least 2026.

Banfield had a mixed start to the 2025 AFL season, playing the first six games before being dropped after the Round 6 loss to Melbourne and returning in Round 10. In Round 11 against Port Adelaide, teammate Cooper Simpson suffered an AC joint injury in the first quarter. With limited options at half-back, Banfield was switched to defence after starting the match as the substitute. He played well in the 49-point win, recording 17 disposals and a career-high 16 kicks. Following this strong performance, Banfield kept his spot in the backline for the remainder of the season, including in Fremantle's elimination final.

In 2026, however, Banfield was unable to break back into Fremantle's AFL team, playing for Peel Thunder for the entire season before being recalled for Fremantle's final game of the home and away season. He was omitted for the finals, but won the WAFL premiership with Peel. At the 2026 Brownlow Medal night, Banfield was awarded the Jim Stynes Community Leadership Award for his community and charity work. Banfield was ultimately delisted at the end of the season, but had reportedly gained interest from two unspecified Victorian clubs.

== Personal life ==
Banfield married Julia Edwards in October 2024. In September 2026, the couple announced they were expecting their first child.

== Statistics ==
Updated to the end of the 2025 season.

Legend
G	Goals	K	Kicks	D	Disposals	T	Tackles
B	Behinds	H	Handballs	M	Marks

Season	Team	No.	Games	Totals							Averages (per game)							Votes
Season	Team	No.	Games	G	B	K	H	D	M	T	G	B	K	H	D	M	T	Votes
2018	Fremantle	41	20	5	5	162	129	291	65	81	0.3	0.3	8.1	6.5	14.6	3.3	4.1	0
2019	Fremantle	41	7	2	1	39	54	93	18	30	0.3	0.1	5.6	7.7	13.3	2.6	4.3	0
2020 (Note: The 2020 season was played with 17 home-and-away matches per team (down from 22) and 16-minute quarters with time on (down from 20-minute quarters with time on) due to the impact of the COVID-19 pandemic.)	Fremantle	41	5	2	0	26	21	47	8	17	0.4	0.0	5.2	4.2	9.4	1.6	3.4	0
2021	Fremantle	41	6	4	2	29	27	56	12	14	0.7	0.3	4.8	4.5	9.3	2.0	2.3	0
2022 (Note: 2022 statistics include five games when Banfield was used as the substitute (round 3, 6, 11, 16 & 22) and five games when Banfield wasn’t used as the substitute (rounds 4, 7, 20, Finals Week 1 & Semi Final).)	Fremantle	41	23	18	14	102	41	143	46	26	0.8	0.6	4.4	1.8	6.2	2.0	1.1	0
2023 (Note: 2023 statistics include a game when Banfield was substituted out (round 13).)	Fremantle	41	14	11	9	89	71	160	41	16	0.8	0.6	6.4	5.1	11.4	2.9	1.1	0
2024	Fremantle	41	22	20	13	174	140	314	74	56	0.9	0.6	7.9	6.4	14.3	3.4	2.5	1
2025	Fremantle	41	21	4	2	172	106	278	67	45	0.2	0.1	8.2	5.0	13.2	3.2	2.1	0
Career			118	66	46	793	589	1382	331	285	0.6	0.4	6.7	5.0	11.7	2.8	2.4	1

=== WAFL statistics ===
Statistics are correct to the end of the 2025 season.

Legend
G	Goals	K	Kicks	D	Disposals	T	Tackles
B	Behinds	H	Handballs	M	Marks

Season	Team	No.	Games	Totals							Averages (per game)						
Season	Team	No.	Games	G	B	K	H	D	M	T	G	B	K	H	D	M	T
2016	Claremont	51	2	1	0	20	18	38	6	7	0.5	0.0	10.0	9.0	19.0	3.0	3.5
2017	Claremont	34	20	4	5	322	162	484	80	112	0.2	0.2	16.1	8.1	24.2	4.0	5.6
2019	Peel Thunder	2/13	11	9	4	191	99	290	46	79	0.8	0.3	17.3	9.0	26.3	4.1	7.1
2021	Peel Thunder	6/24/38	6	7	8	49	27	76	22	24	1.1	1.3	8.1	4.5	12.6	3.6	4.0
2022	Peel Thunder	24/39/51	3	3	5	16	10	26	9	9	1.0	1.6	5.3	3.3	8.6	3.0	3.0
2023	Peel Thunder	6/55	3	6	4	36	9	45	17	16	2.0	1.3	12.0	3.0	15.0	5.7	5.3
2025	Peel Thunder	4	2	5	0	15	12	27	5	11	2.5	0.0	7.5	6.0	13.5	2.5	5.5
Career			47	35	26	649	337	986	185	258	0.7	0.6	13.8	7.2	21.0	3.9	5.5
