= Isaiah Dudley =

Australian rules footballer (born 2003)

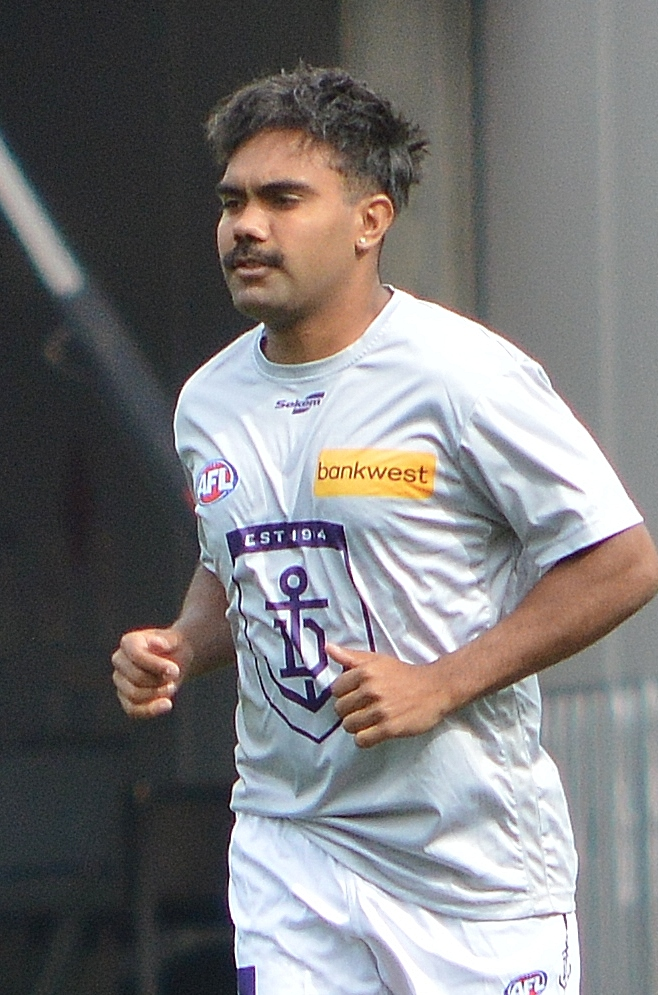
- Dudley in April 2025

Personal information
- Full name: Isaiah Dudley
- Nickname: Deadly Dudley
- Born: 30 April 2003 (age 23); Port Lincoln, South Australia
- Original team: Central District
- Draft: Pre-season supplementary signing, 2024 national draft
- Debut: Round 3, 2025, Fremantle vs. West Coast, at Optus Stadium
- Height: 168 cm (5 ft 6 in)
- Position: Forward

Club information
- Current club: Fremantle
- Number: 43

Playing career^{1}
Years	Club	Games (Goals)
2025–	Fremantle	43 (49)
- ^{1} Playing statistics correct to the end of the 2026 season.

Isaiah Dudley (born 30 April 2003) is an Australian rules footballer who plays for the Fremantle Football Club in the Australian Football League (AFL). He mainly plays as a small forward.

== Early life ==
Dudley was born in the South Australian city of Port Lincoln and was raised in the state capital of Adelaide. He is the former schoolmate and cousin of current Melbourne player Kysaiah Pickett and is related to former players Eddie Betts and Shaun Burgoyne. He attended Prince Alfred College where he played school football alongside Pickett.

Before being recruited by Fremantle, Dudley played for Central District in the South Australian National Football League (SANFL). He was also a member of the Adelaide Next Generation Academy.

== AFL career ==
In December 2024, Dudley was invited by Fremantle to try out for the last remaining list spot. He was selected to join Fremantle's list in February 2025, and made his AFL debut in the Western Derby in round 3 of the 2025 AFL season. He kicked two goals in the first quarter to help Fremantle record a comfortable win.

Dudley had a strong start to the 2026 AFL season, kicking 3 goals in each of his first 2 games.

== Statistics ==
Updated to the end of the 2026 season.

Legend
G	Goals	K	Kicks	D	Disposals	T	Tackles
B	Behinds	H	Handballs	M	Marks

Season	Team	No.	Games	Totals							Averages (per game)							Votes
Season	Team	No.	Games	G	B	K	H	D	M	T	G	B	K	H	D	M	T	Votes
2025	Fremantle	43	16	15	9	74	39	113	33	29	0.9	0.6	4.6	2.4	7.1	2.1	1.8	0
2026	Fremantle	43	27	34	21	165	120	285	48	68	1.3	0.8	6.1	4.4	10.6	1.8	2.5	0
Career			43	49	30	239	159	398	81	97	1.1	0.7	5.6	3.7	9.3	1.9	2.3	0
