= James Aish =

Australian rules footballer (born 1995)

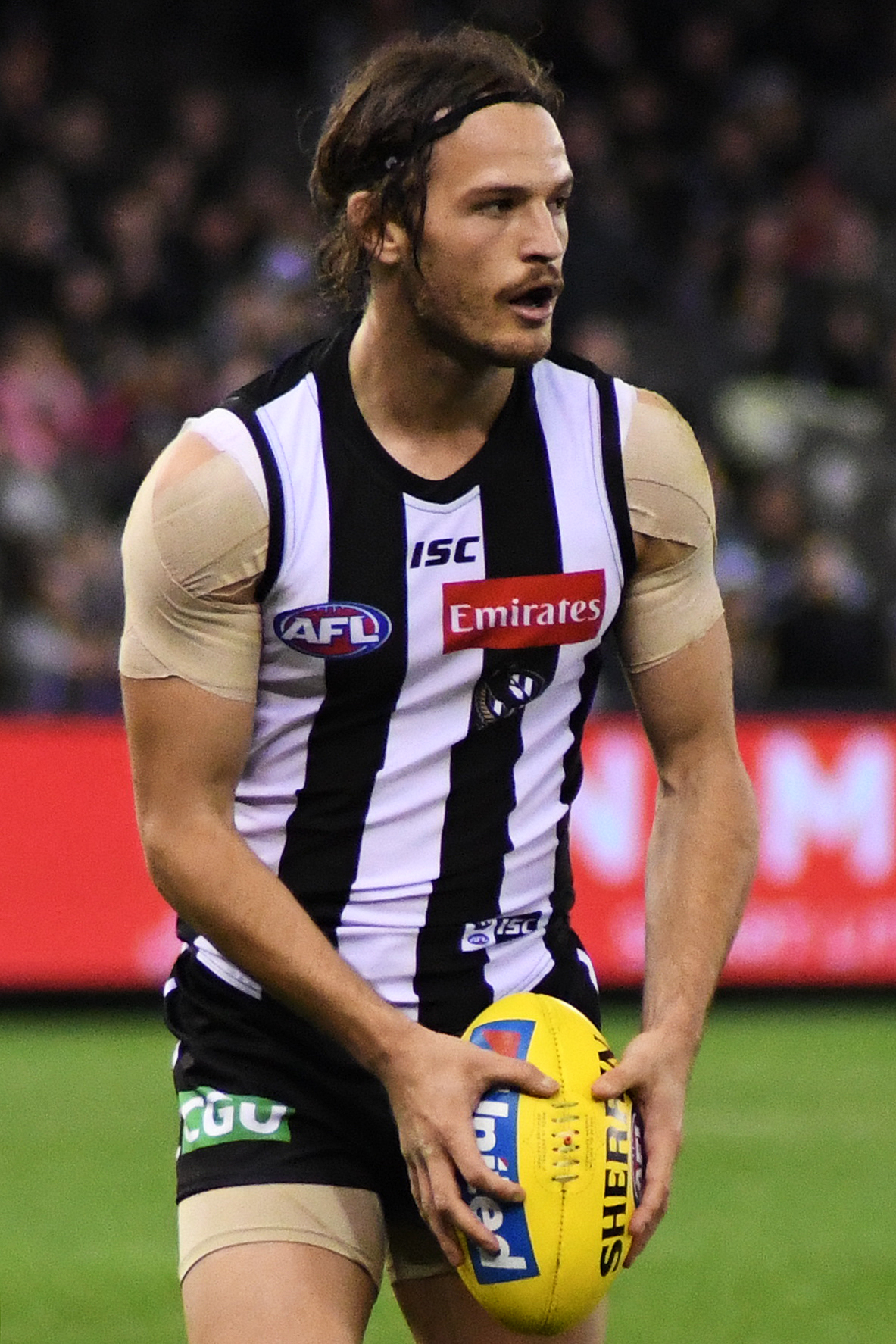
- Aish playing for Collingwood in August 2018

Personal information
- Full name: James Aish
- Born: 8 November 1995 (age 30)
- Original team: Norwood (SANFL)
- Draft: 1. 7, 2013 National Draft, Brisbane Lions
- Height: 183 cm (6 ft 0 in)
- Weight: 83 kg (183 lb)
- Position: Midfielder

Playing career
Years	Club	Games (Goals)
2014–2015	Brisbane Lions	32 (8)
2016–2019	Collingwood	50 (15)
2020–2025	Fremantle	104 (10)
Total		186 (33)

Career highlights
- 2× SANFL premiership player: 2012, 2013; 2014 AFL Rising Star nominee

James Aish (born 8 November 1995) is a former professional Australian rules football player who played with the Brisbane Lions, Collingwood Football Club and Fremantle Football Club in the Australian Football League (AFL).

== Early life ==
He is the son of former Norwood midfielder Andrew Aish, the nephew of 1981 Magarey Medallist Michael Aish and the grandson of former Norwood captain Peter Aish.

Aish broke a South Australian National Football League (SANFL) record by becoming the youngest Norwood player in 134 years to debut at league level. He was 16 on his SANFL debut at Norwood and played in SANFL premierships in both 2012 and 2013. Aish received Under 18 All-Australian honours in both 2012 and 2013.

== AFL career ==
Aish was drafted by the Brisbane Lions with their first selection and 7th overall in the 2013 AFL draft. He made his debut in the opening round of the 2014 AFL season against Hawthorn where he collected 17 disposals. He collected a season-high 25 disposals (including 12 contested), laid four tackles and kicked a goal in Round 6 against St Kilda, which not only helped the Lions secure their first win of the season, but also earned him a Rising Star nomination.

He went on to play in all but one of the team's 21 senior matches (he was rested from the Lions' Round 14 clash against Fremantle in Perth) and collected 20 or more disposals on nine occasions. Aish ranked 6th at the club in total disposals (370), 4th in marks (94), 5th in tackles (77), and 7th in clearances (43). He finished fourth in the NAB AFL Rising Star award – behind Lions teammate Lewis Taylor who was awarded the Ron Evans Medal – and finished ninth in his maiden Merrett–Murray Medal count.

In October 2015, he was traded to Collingwood.

He was traded to Fremantle at the conclusion of the 2019 AFL season. Aish's first season at Fremantle was during the COVID-19 affected 2020 AFL season, which saw only 17 games played instead of 21. Aish finished the season having played all but one game. Although traditionally a midfielder before joining Fremantle, Aish's versatility meant he often spent time rotating between the wing, midfield and defence.

Round 16 of the 2022 AFL season saw Aish collect 29 disposals and kick 2 goals during Fremantle's 8-point win over Port Adelaide at Optus Stadium.

Aish collected an equal career-high 31 disposals and was among Fremantle's best in Round 3 of the 2023 AFL season, during the Western Derby.

Aish made the line-up for Fremantle's opening game of the 2024 AFL season against his former side the Brisbane Lions at Optus Stadium. Aish played an important role collecting 26 disposals and six score involvements during the 23-point come from behind win. He collected 29 disposals two weeks later in round three against Adelaide at Optus Stadium. Aish was one of Fremantle's better players in round four during their game against Carlton at Adelaide Oval, which was played in Adelaide due to the AFL's Gather Round. He finished the game with 27 disposals. The match was not without controversy as a kick which was touched by James before being marked by Matt Cottrell went unseen by the AFL umpire's, resulting in a crucial Carlton goal in the last two minutes of the game. The poor officiating was subject to both media scrutiny and fan backlash in the days following.

Aish announced his retirement at the conclusion of Fremantle's 2025 season.

== Personal life ==
Aish is currently studying a Bachelor of Psychological Science at Deakin University.

== Statistics ==
Legend
G	Goals	K	Kicks	D	Disposals	T	Tackles
B	Behinds	H	Handballs	M	Marks

Season	Team	No.	Games	Totals							Averages (per game)							Votes
Season	Team	No.	Games	G	B	K	H	D	M	T	G	B	K	H	D	M	T	Votes
2014	Brisbane Lions	4	21	6	6	185	185	370	94	77	0.3	0.3	8.8	8.8	17.6	4.5	3.7	0
2015	Brisbane Lions	4	11	2	1	86	71	157	24	29	0.2	0.1	7.8	6.5	14.3	2.2	2.6	0
2016	Collingwood	14	15	10	3	128	109	237	42	42	0.7	0.2	8.5	7.3	15.8	2.8	2.8	1
2017	Collingwood	14	8	1	2	69	56	125	29	24	0.1	0.3	8.6	7.0	15.6	3.6	3.0	0
2018	Collingwood	14	13	4	3	130	92	222	47	38	0.3	0.2	10.0	7.1	17.1	3.6	2.9	0
2019	Collingwood	14	14	0	1	133	98	231	61	35	0.0	0.1	9.5	7.0	16.5	4.4	2.5	0
2020 (Note: The 2020 season was played with 17 home-and-away matches per team (down from 22) and 16-minute quarters with time on (down from 20-minute quarters with time on) due to the impact of the COVID-19 pandemic.)	Fremantle	11	16	0	2	162	103	265	63	25	0.0	0.1	10.1	6.4	16.6	3.9	1.6	0
2021	Fremantle	11	22	1	8	236	178	414	92	49	0.0	0.4	10.7	8.1	18.8	4.2	2.2	0
2022	Fremantle	11	23	5	3	261	218	479	103	56	0.2	0.1	11.3	9.5	20.8	4.5	2.4	3
2023	Fremantle	11	20	4	4	224	172	396	80	49	0.2	0.2	11.2	8.6	19.8	4.0	2.5	0
2024	Fremantle	11	20	0	4	199	140	339	103	30	0.0	0.2	10.0	7.0	17.0	5.2	1.5	0
2025	Fremantle	11	3	0	0	11	12	23	4	2	0.0	0.0	3.7	4.0	7.7	1.3	0.7	0
Career			186	33	37	1824	1434	3258	742	456	0.2	0.2	9.8	7.7	17.5	4.0	2.5	4
