= Josh Draper =

Australian rules footballer

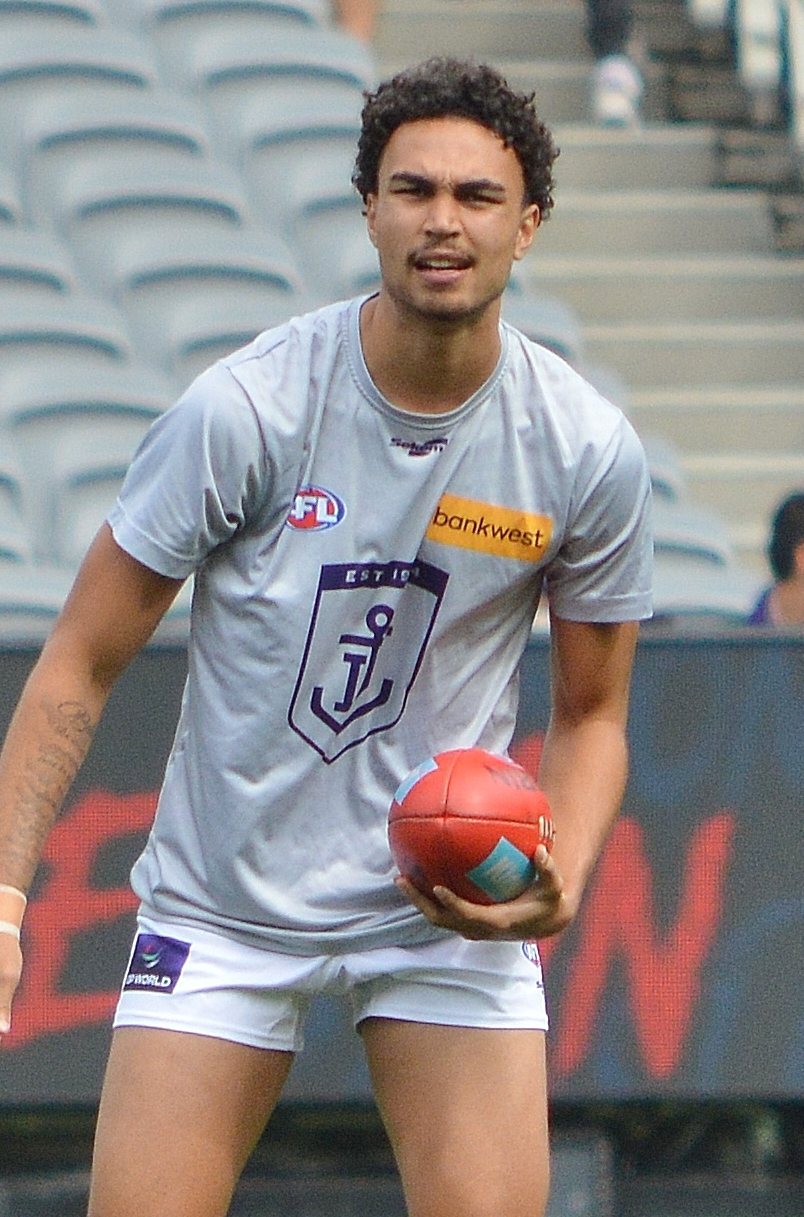
- Draper in April 2025

Personal information
- Full name: Joshua Draper
- Born: 8 February 2004 (age 22)
- Original team: Peel Thunder
- Draft: Category B rookie signing, 2022 National draft, Fremantle
- Debut: Round 2, 2024, Fremantle vs. North Melbourne, at Marvel Stadium
- Height: 197 cm (6 ft 6 in)
- Position: Key Defender

Club information
- Current club: Fremantle
- Number: 37

Playing career^{1}
Years	Club	Games (Goals)
2023–	Fremantle	31 (0)
- ^{1} Playing statistics correct to the end of the 2026 season.

Career highlights
- AFL Rising Star nominee: 2024; 22under22 team: 2024; Beacon Award: 2024; West Australian Football League premiership player: 2026

Joshua Draper is an Australian rules footballer, currently playing for Fremantle in the Australian Football League.

== AFL career ==
=== Fremantle (2023–) ===
Draper was signed as a Category B Rookie from Fremantle's Next Generation Academy in the 2022 AFL draft. He qualified due to Ethiopian heritage on his mother's side.

==== 2024 season ====
He played for the reserve side, Peel Thunder in the WAFL, for his first season at the club. In Round 1 of the 2024 AFL season, Fremantle conceded two injuries to key defenders Brennan Cox and Oscar McDonald. This provided Draper with his opportunity to debut for the senior team in Round 2 against North Melbourne at Marvel Stadium. On debut, Draper collected 7 disposals in a 26-point win away from home. Due to this solid performance on debut, Draper kept his spot in the team for Fremantle's Round 3 clash with Adelaide in the west. Draper played even better in this match collecting 14 disposals and 4 marks. Josh made the journey east for Fremantle's two-week stint in Adelaide, first facing Carlton in the Gather Round, and Port Adelaide the following week. Perhaps his best game came in Round sixteen against Sydney at the Sydney Cricket Ground. With Fremantle captain and key defender Alex Pearce missing the game due to injury, Draper was tasked with playing on some of the Swans most dangerous forwards and was instrumental in the one-point win. He finished with 14 disposals and a career-high 11 spoils. He received a 2024 AFL Rising Star nomination for his career-high 18-disposal game at 94 percent efficiency during Western Derby 59. He signed a two-year contract extension on August 12, to remain at Fremantle until at least the end of 2027.
