= Sebit Kuek =

Australian rules football player

Personal information
- Full name: Sebit Kuek
- Born: 11 November 2000 (age 25); Kenya
- Original team: East Perth Football Club
- Draft: No. 15, 2022 mid-season draft
- Height: 199 cm (6 ft 6 in)
- Weight: 77 kg (170 lb)
- Position: Key forward

Club information
- Current club: Fremantle
- Number: 43

Playing career^{1}
Years	Club	Games (Goals)
2022–2024	Fremantle	0 (0)
- ^{1} Playing statistics correct to the end of 2024.

Sebit Kuek (born 11 November 2000) is an Australian rules footballer who played for the Fremantle Football Club in the Australian Football League (AFL).

== Early life ==
Sebit was born in Kenya to South Sudanese parents. He moved to Australia at the age of eight and spent two years in Melbourne, before settling in the Western Australian capital city of Perth. Kuek started playing Australian rules football at around age twelve, and played junior football for the East Perth Football Club Colts team. He was a member of the West Coast Eagles Next Generation Academy and made his league debut for East Perth during the 2020 WAFL season.

== Football career ==
=== Fremantle ===
Sebit was drafted by Fremantle with their first pick, the 15th overall, in the 2022 mid-season draft. He made his debut for Fremantle's West Australian Football League affiliate Peel Thunder later that year. Kuek continued to play for Peel during the 2023 WAFL season, a highlight being his six goal effort against the Perth Football Club in round ten. Unfortunately, he suffered an ACL injury one month later playing against East Fremantle, and as a result was placed on the clubs long-term injury list. He was delisted by Fremantle following the 2024 AFL season.
