= Michael Frederick (footballer) =

Australian rules footballer

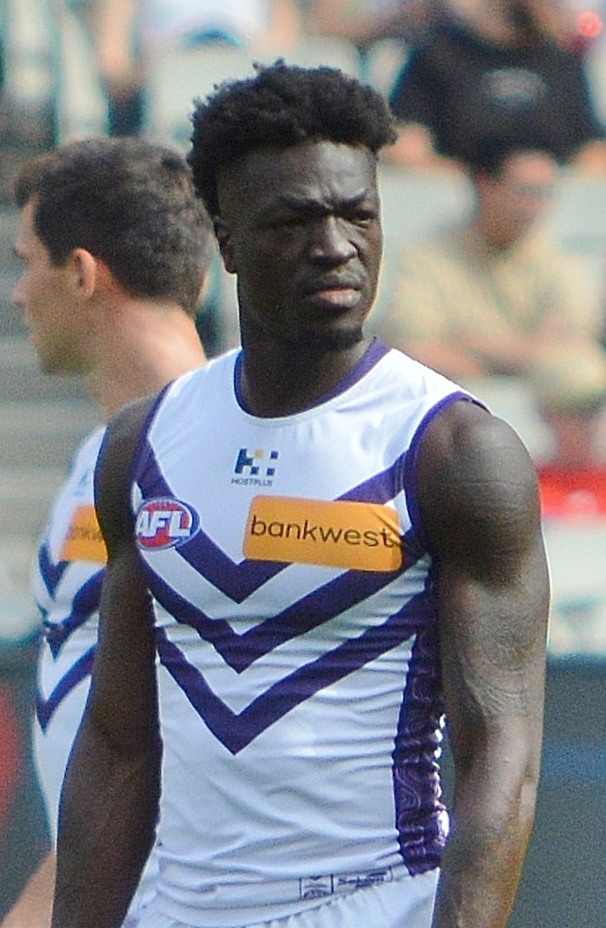
- Frederick in April 2025

Personal information
- Full name: Minairo Frederick
- Nicknames: Freddy, Rick
- Born: 17 May 2000 (age 26); Adelaide, South Australia
- Original team: Woodville-West Torrens (SANFL)
- Draft: No. 61, 2019 National draft, Fremantle
- Height: 183 cm (6 ft 0 in)
- Weight: 81 kg (179 lb)
- Position: Forward

Club information
- Current club: Fremantle
- Number: 32

Playing career^{1}
Years	Club	Games (Goals)
2020–	Fremantle	124 (143)
- ^{1} Playing statistics correct to the end of 2026.

Minairo "Michael" Frederick (born 17 May 2000) is an Australian rules footballer who plays for the Fremantle Football Club in the Australian Football League (AFL).

== Early life ==
Fredrick was born in Adelaide, South Australia, to South Sudanese migrant parents. He was named Minairo at birth, but prefers to be known by his baptised name, Michael. His twin brother Manguru (Martin) formerly played for Port Adelaide. He completed school at Christian Brothers College, Adelaide in 2018. He was drafted with the 61st selection in the 2019 AFL draft from Woodville-West Torrens in the South Australian National Football League (SANFL), where he had won the Alan Stewart Medal as the best player in the 2019 SANFL Under 18 Grand Final.

== Professional career ==
=== 2020–2021: Early career ===
Frederick made his AFL debut for Fremantle during round seven of the 2020 AFL season in the Western Derby at Optus Stadium, kicking a goal on debut. Frederick finished his debut year having played 10 games and kicked four goals.

On 7 March, in a pre-season practice match against West Coast, Frederick suffered a low-grade calf strain. As a result, he missed Fremantle's opening game of the season against Melbourne, before returning to the line-up in Round 2. In Round 8 against Brisbane, Frederick suffered an ankle injury during a marking contest in the first quarter and was substituted out of the game. It was later confirmed to be an ankle syndesmosis injury. He required surgery, with an estimated recovery time of 10–12 weeks, effectively ruling him out for the remainder of the season.

=== 2022: Breakout season ===
Frederick made his return in Round 1 of the 2022 AFL season against Adelaide at Adelaide Oval, recording 8 disposals and kicking 1 goal. He was quiet the following week, recording just the 6 disposals and 1 behind before starting to find some consistency, kicking 2 goals in each of his next 3 games. In Round 11, Frederick had a stand-out performance against Melbourne at the MCG. He kicked two important goals in the second half and finished with a game-high 11 score involvements, 17 disposals and four marks to be one of Fremantle's best players in the 38-point win. He received an equal team-high 8 coaches' votes (tied with Rory Lobb) for his performance. Frederick again had a strong performance the following week in Fremantle's top four clash against Brisbane, kicking 3 goals and amassing 18 disposals, 7 score involvements and 10 marks in the 14-point win.

Later that month, Frederick was handed a one-match ban by Fremantle after consuming alcohol during a six-day break. As a result, he missed Fremantle's Round 13 game against Hawthorn. Frederick was again one of Fremantle's best players in Round 17 in a 41-point win over St Kilda, kicking an equal game-high 3 goals. In July, Frederick signed a three-year contract extension, keeping him at Fremantle until at least 2026. Frederick finished the season having played a career-high 22 games, including both of Fremantle's finals appearances, in a breakout season. He finished third in Fremantle's leading goalkicker award with a career-best 28 goals, only behind Rory Lobb (36 goals) and Lachie Schultz (30 goals).

=== 2023–2024 ===
Frederick made a memorable impact in Round 20 of the 2023 AFL season in Fremantle's 7-point win over Geelong at Kardinia Park, kicking an "unbelievable goal" at a crucial stage in the game from a difficult angle to help win the match. Despite being labeled "one of the goals of the season" by Fox Sports journalist Mark Howard, it failed to receive the Goal of the Year nomination, with Taylor Walker of the Adelaide Crows instead winning the nomination.

Frederick made the line-up for Fremantle's opening game of the 2024 AFL season against the Brisbane Lions. He collected 15 disposals and kicked an impressive goal in the final quarter during the 23-point win. He kicked two goals the next week against North Melbourne at Marvel Stadium.

=== 2025 ===
In Round 20 of the 2025 AFL season, Frederick kicked 4 goals against West Coast, both a career-high and a game-high. He finished the season having played every game and with a career-best 30 goals, which placed him fourth in the leading goalkicker award. He also finished seventh in the best and fairest award count, the Doig Medal. In September, he signed a three-year contract extension, keeping him at Fremantle until at least 2029.

== Statistics ==
Updated to the end of round 22, 2026.

Legend
G	Goals	K	Kicks	D	Disposals	T	Tackles
B	Behinds	H	Handballs	M	Marks

Season	Team	No.	Games	Totals							Averages (per game)							Votes
Season	Team	No.	Games	G	B	K	H	D	M	T	G	B	K	H	D	M	T	Votes
2020 (Note: The 2020 season was played with 17 home-and-away matches per team (down from 22) and 16-minute quarters with time on (down from 20-minute quarters with time on) due to the impact of the COVID-19 pandemic.)	Fremantle	43	10	4	6	41	39	80	18	8	0.4	0.6	4.1	3.9	8.0	1.8	0.8	0
2021	Fremantle	43	7	5	11	52	16	68	35	7	0.7	1.6	7.4	2.3	9.7	5.0	1.0	0
2022	Fremantle	32	22	28	14	154	85	239	74	51	1.3	0.6	7.0	3.9	10.9	3.4	2.3	0
2023	Fremantle	32	19	26	12	151	76	227	77	32	1.4	0.6	7.9	4.0	11.9	4.1	1.7	0
2024	Fremantle	32	20	23	17	126	66	192	70	30	1.2	0.9	6.3	3.3	9.6	3.5	1.5	0
2025	Fremantle	32	24	30	24	177	95	272	81	56	1.3	1.0	7.4	4.0	11.3	3.4	2.3	0
2026	Fremantle	32	16	20	9	130	65	195	61	34	1.3	0.6	8.1	4.1	12.2	3.8	2.1	0
Career			118	136	93	831	442	1273	416	218	1.2	0.8	7.0	3.7	10.8	3.5	1.8	0
