= Brennan Cox =

Australian rules footballer (born 1998)

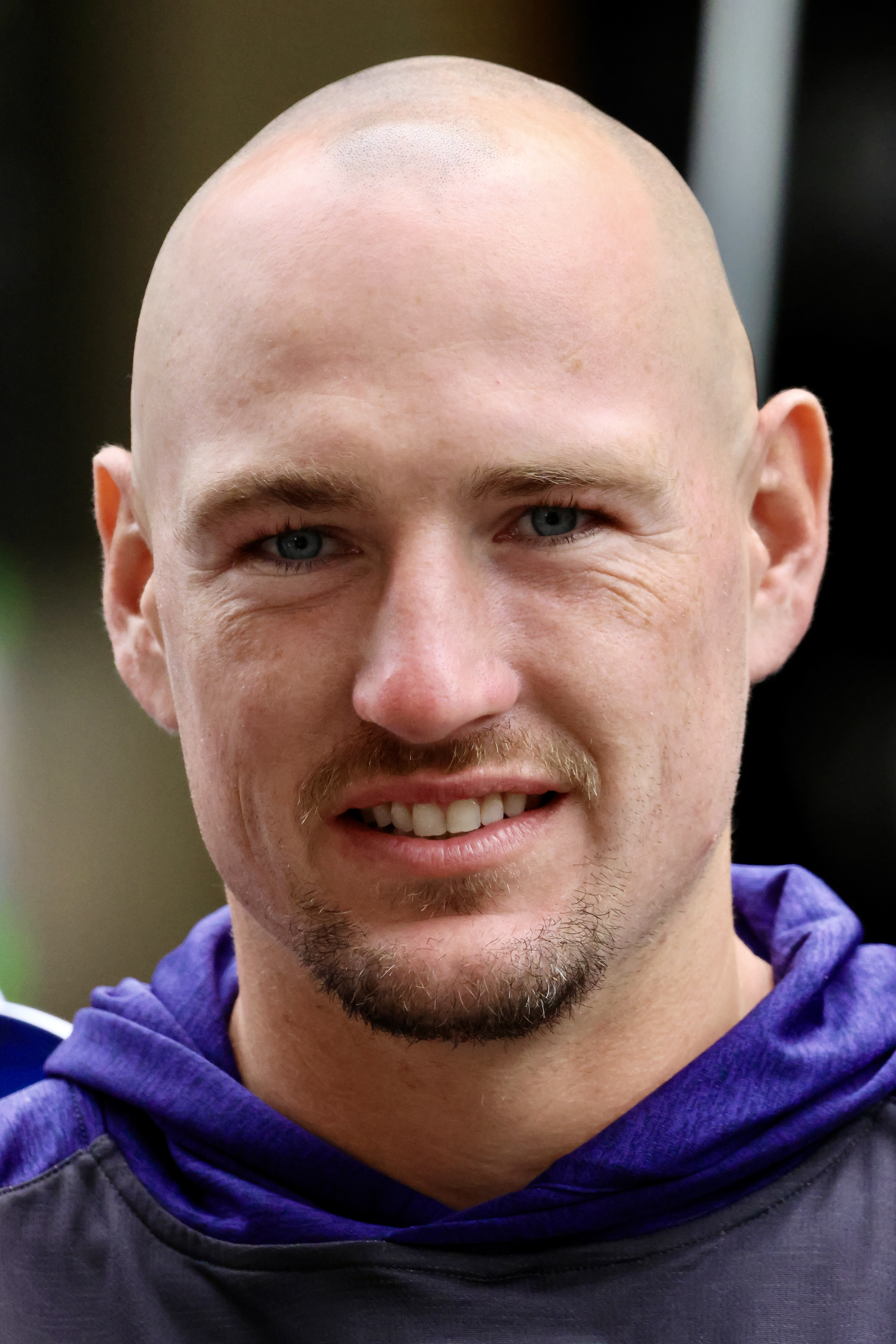
- Cox at the 2026 Gather Round

Personal information
- Full name: Brennan Cox
- Born: 13 August 1998 (age 28)
- Original team: Woodville-West Torrens (SANFL)
- Draft: No. 41, 2016 AFL draft
- Height: 195 cm (6 ft 5 in)
- Weight: 100 kg (220 lb)
- Position: Key Defender / Key Forward

Club information
- Current club: Fremantle
- Number: 36

Playing career^{1}
Years	Club	Games (Goals)
2017–	Fremantle	152 (32)
- ^{1} Playing statistics correct to the end of Round 23, 2026.

Career highlights
- 2018 AFL Rising Star nominee; Beacon Award winner: 2018

Brennan Cox (born 13 August 1998) is a professional Australian rules footballer playing for the Fremantle Football Club in the Australian Football League (AFL).

== Early career ==
Originally from Woodville South in Adelaide, Cox played for Woodville-West Torrens in the South Australian National Football League (SANFL) in 2016. He also represented South Australia at the 2016 AFL Under 18 Championships and was named as the centre-half back in the All-Australian team.

== AFL career ==
He was recruited as a versatile player to Fremantle with their third selection, 41st overall, in the 2016 AFL draft. He made his AFL debut in round 12 of the 2017 AFL season against Brisbane at the Gabba, after playing well for Fremantle's reserves team, Peel Thunder, in the West Australian Football League (WAFL). Cox kicked a career-high four goals during round 12 of the 2018 AFL season, for which he received a 2018 AFL Rising Star award nomination.

After starting his career playing mostly as a forward between 2017 and 2019, Cox made his debut as a defender during the 2020 AFL season. Cox made a case for All-Australian selection during the 2022 AFL season with his ability to shut down some of the best forwards in the competition, he was named in the initial 44-man squad but didn't make the final 22. Cox played 23 games in 2022 a career best and also averaged 16.5 disposals a game, which is elite for a key defender. He finished the season polling runner-up in Fremantle's best and fairest award.

Round 1 of the 2023 AFL season against St Kilda saw Cox equal the Fremantle games record for most marks in a single game, collecting 20 marks and 30 disposals. He was sent forward the next round against North Melbourne during the last quarter after Fremantle struggled to capitalize on their scoring opportunities, kicking a goal.

Already signed until 2024, Cox re-signed for a 6-year contract extension in October 2023 that will last until at least 2030.

Brennan made the line-up for Fremantle's opening game of the 2024 AFL season against the Brisbane Lions, playing as a key forward. He kicked a goal during the 23 point come from behind win. Unfortunately, Cox suffered a hamstring injury in the final quarter after landing awkwardly whilst contesting for a mark. Cox made his return to the AFL in round 17 of the 2024 AFL season after two weeks of managed minutes in the WAFL, playing as a key defender. Fremantle ended up being 51 point winners against a struggling Richmond side.

== Personal life ==
Cox has a son, born in 2024, with Keah Waters. Cox and Waters became engaged in December 2025.

== Statistics ==
Updated to the end of round 22, 2026.

Legend
G	Goals	K	Kicks	D	Disposals	T	Tackles
B	Behinds	H	Handballs	M	Marks

Season	Team	No.	Games	Totals							Averages (per game)							Votes
Season	Team	No.	Games	G	B	K	H	D	M	T	G	B	K	H	D	M	T	Votes
2017	Fremantle	36	10	4	11	56	56	112	47	16	0.4	1.1	5.6	5.6	11.2	4.7	1.6	0
2018	Fremantle	36	16	18	14	105	80	185	70	39	1.1	0.9	6.6	5.0	11.6	4.4	2.4	1
2019	Fremantle	36	8	5	2	31	45	76	29	20	0.6	0.3	3.9	5.6	9.5	3.6	2.5	0
2020 (Note: The 2020 season was played with 17 home-and-away matches per team (down from 22) and 16-minute quarters with time on (down from 20-minute quarters with time on) due to the impact of the COVID-19 pandemic.)	Fremantle	36	13	0	0	83	65	148	51	11	0.0	0.0	6.4	5.0	11.4	3.9	0.8	0
2021	Fremantle	36	12	0	0	87	55	142	56	11	0.0	0.0	7.3	4.6	11.8	4.7	0.9	0
2022	Fremantle	36	23	1	1	271	109	380	146	25	0.0	0.0	11.8	4.7	16.5	6.3	1.1	0
2023	Fremantle	36	20	2	0	210	128	338	151	19	0.1	0.0	10.5	6.4	16.9	7.6	1.0	0
2024	Fremantle	36	9	1	0	67	33	100	48	13	0.1	0.0	7.4	3.7	11.1	5.3	1.4	0
2025	Fremantle	36	24	1	0	158	95	253	114	29	0.0	0.0	6.6	4.0	10.5	4.8	1.2	0
2026	Fremantle	36	16	0	0	130	71	201	83	27	0.0	0.0	8.1	4.4	12.6	5.2	1.7	0
Career			151	32	28	1198	737	1935	795	210	0.2	0.2	7.9	4.9	12.8	5.3	1.4	1
