= Sam Switkowski =

Australian rules footballer (born 1996)

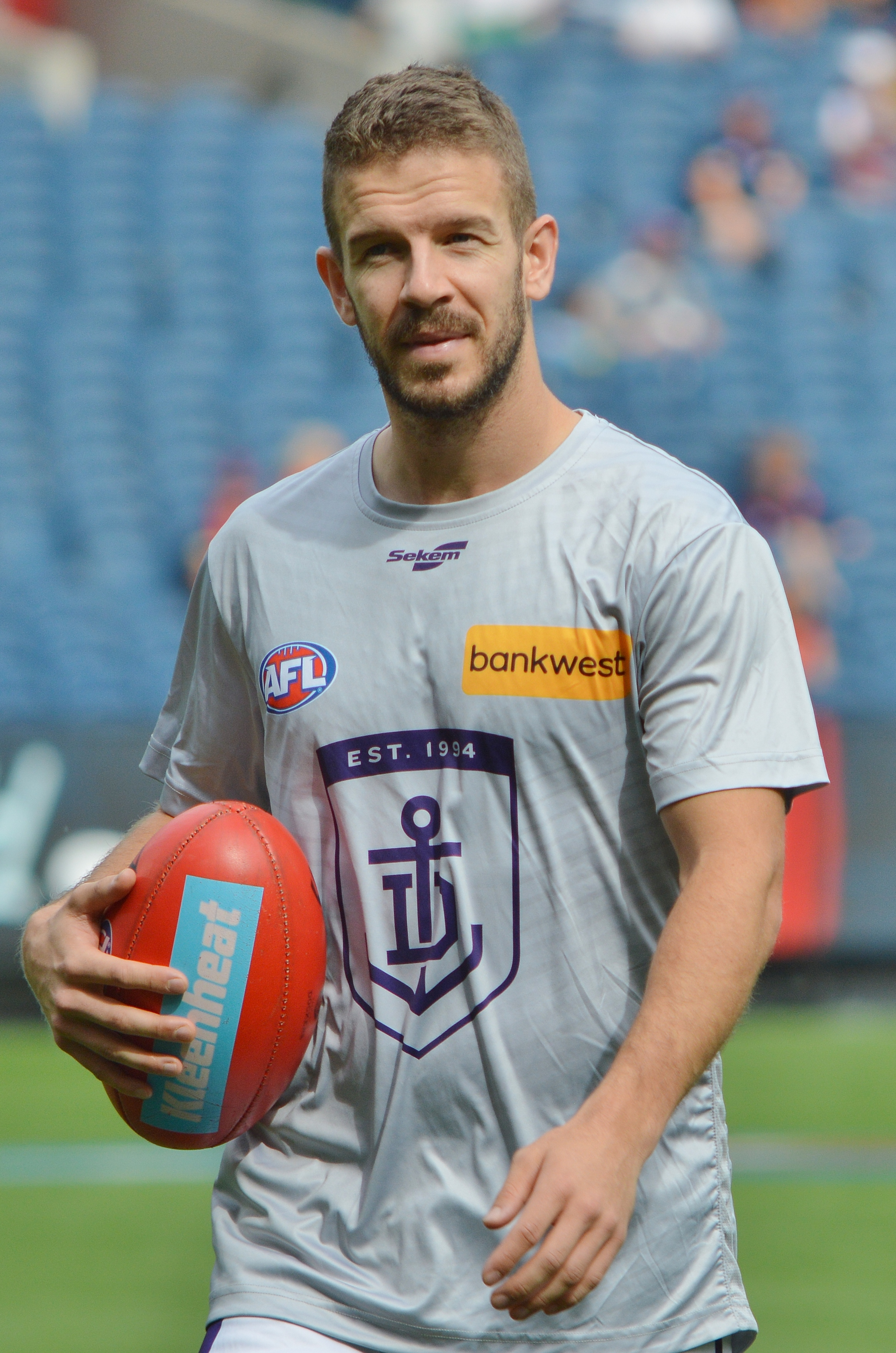
- Switkowski in April 2025

Personal information
- Full name: Samuel Switkowski
- Nickname: Switta
- Born: 20 November 1996 (age 29)
- Original team: Box Hill Hawks (VFL)
- Draft: No. 73, 2017 national draft
- Height: 179 cm (5 ft 10 in)
- Weight: 74 kg (163 lb)
- Position: Forward

Playing career^{1}
Years	Club	Games (Goals)
2018–2026	Fremantle	131 (79)
- ^{1} Playing statistics correct to the end of the 2026 season.

Career highlights
- Beacon Award winner: 2019; 2x Fremantle Best Clubman Award: 2022, 2026

Sam Switkowski (born 20 November 1996) is a former Australian rules footballer who played for the Fremantle Football Club in the Australian Football League (AFL).

== Early career ==
Switkowski attended school at Eltham College. He played for the Northern Knights in the TAC Cup Under 18s competition, winning their best and fairest award in 2014. However, he was overlooked in the 2014 AFL draft and joined the Box Hill Hawks Football Club in the Victorian Football League (VFL). He again missed selection in the 2015 and 2016 drafts, but was recruited by Fremantle with their second last selection, 73rd overall, in the 2017 AFL draft.

== AFL career ==
Despite having an interrupted first season at Fremantle due to hamstring injuries, Switkowski made his AFL debut in Round 21 of the 2018 AFL season, against Carlton at Etihad Stadium. A small forward known for his tackling and other pressure acts, he has been compared to his former Fremantle teammate Hayden Ballantyne. Switkowski missed the 2020 AFL season due to sustaining a stress fracture in his back.

In 2022, he was ranked the number one small forward in the league for forward half pressure points per game (37.7) by Champion Data, and the third best small forward for tackles per game. Switkowski signed a contract extension during the 2022 AFL season, tying him to the club until at least 2024. Following the 2022 AFL season, Switkowski was promoted to Fremantle's leadership group.

Sam had a standout performance in round three of the 2023 AFL season, collecting 21 disposals, 10 score involvements and kicking two goals. He signed a two-year contract extension in June of 2023. Switkowski was a major contributor in Round 20 during Fremantle's 7-point win over Geelong at Kardinia Park, collecting 17 disposals, six score involvements and kicking a goal.

Switkowski made the line-up for Fremantle's opening game of 2024 AFL season, against the Brisbane Lions at Optus Stadium. He kicked Fremantle's second goal of the game and finished with twelve disposals, a game-high three inside-50s, six score involvements and nine tackles. He collected eight disposals, nine tackles and kicked a goal the following week against North Melbourne. Arguably his best game of the season was against Melbourne in Round 13 at Traeger Park in Alice Springs. Switkowski finished the match with a career-high 25 disposals, 401 metres gained, eight marks, five clearances, six inside 50s, four goal assists and a goal in what was a 92-point drubbing over the Demons. Switkowski played 20 games in 2024 and finished fifth in Fremantle's best and fairest award, polling 168 votes.

Following the 2026 AFL season, Switkowski announced that he would be retiring at the end of Fremantle's finals campaign. Switkowski played his final AFL game in the 2026 AFL Grand Final which Fremantle lost to Brisbane Lions by a margin of 7 points.

== Statistics ==
Updated to the end of round 22, 2026.

Legend
G	Goals	K	Kicks	D	Disposals	T	Tackles
B	Behinds	H	Handballs	M	Marks

Season	Team	No.	Games	Totals							Averages (per game)							Votes
Season	Team	No.	Games	G	B	K	H	D	M	T	G	B	K	H	D	M	T	Votes
2018	Fremantle	39	2	1	1	16	14	30	8	6	0.5	0.5	8.0	7.0	15.0	4.0	3.0	0
2019	Fremantle	39	18	6	3	89	116	205	45	88	0.3	0.2	4.9	6.4	11.4	2.5	4.9	0
2020 (Note: The 2020 season was played with 17 home-and-away matches per team (down from 22) and 16-minute quarters with time on (down from 20-minute quarters with time on) due to the impact of the COVID-19 pandemic.)	Fremantle	39	0	—	—	—	—	—	—	—	—	—	—	—	—	—	—	0
2021	Fremantle	39	12	9	9	79	67	146	36	32	0.8	0.8	6.6	5.6	12.2	3.0	2.7	1
2022	Fremantle	39	14	11	6	79	122	201	23	63	0.8	0.4	5.6	8.7	14.4	1.6	4.5	0
2023	Fremantle	39	22	16	9	134	174	308	58	89	0.7	0.4	6.1	7.9	14.0	2.6	4.0	1
2024	Fremantle	39	20	12	10	130	159	289	63	101	0.6	0.5	6.5	8.0	14.5	3.2	5.1	0
2025	Fremantle	39	17	11	5	96	124	220	43	53	0.6	0.3	5.6	7.3	12.9	2.5	3.1	0
2026	Fremantle	39	21	12	13	105	152	257	51	59	0.6	0.6	5.0	7.2	12.2	2.4	2.8	0
Career			126	78	56	728	928	1656	327	491	0.6	0.4	5.8	7.4	13.1	2.6	3.9	2
