= Josh Treacy =

Australian rules footballer (born 2002)

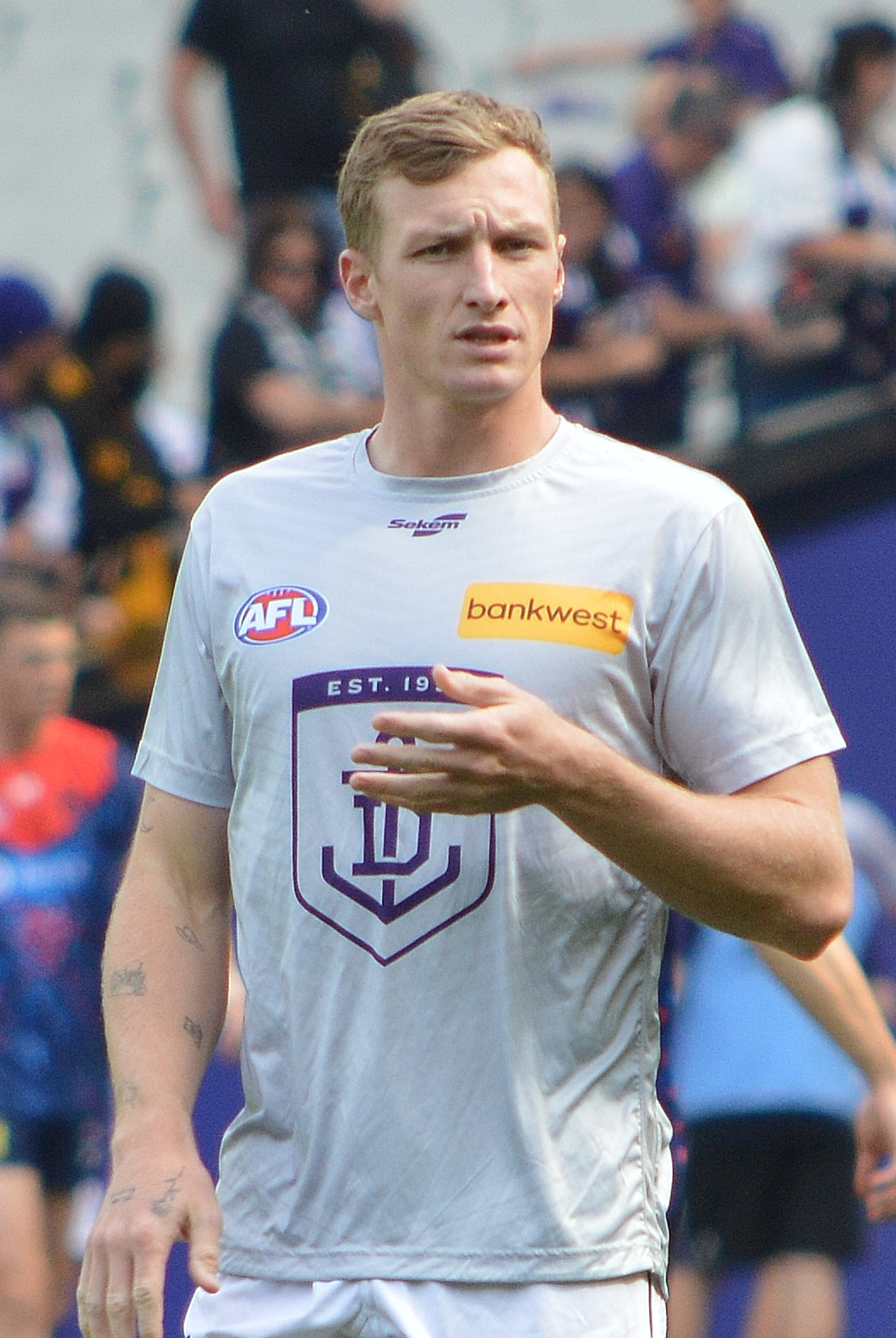
- Treacy in April 2025

Personal information
- Full name: Joshua Treacy
- Nicknames: The Big Cohuna, Cyclone
- Born: 4 August 2002 (age 24)
- Original team: Bendigo Pioneers (NAB League Boys)
- Draft: No. 7, 2021 rookie draft
- Debut: Round 4, 2021, Fremantle vs. Hawthorn, at Optus Stadium
- Height: 195 cm (6 ft 5 in)
- Weight: 94 kg (207 lb)
- Position: Key forward

Club information
- Current club: Fremantle
- Number: 35

Playing career^{1}
Years	Club	Games (Goals)
2021–	Fremantle	107 (175)
- ^{1} Playing statistics correct to the end of the 2026 season.

Career highlights
- All-Australian team: 2026; 22under22 team: 2024; 2x Fremantle leading goalkicker: 2024, 2025

Joshua Treacy (born 4 August 2002) is an Australian rules footballer who plays for the Fremantle Football Club in the Australian Football League (AFL).

== Early life ==
Treacy is from Cohuna, a dairy farming area in the north of Victoria. He participated in the Auskick program at Cohuna and played for the Cohuna Kangas in the Central Murray Football and Netball League and the Bendigo Pioneers in the NAB League Boys Under 18s competition. In 2020, Treacy was named to co-captain the Pioneers, but the season was cancelled due to the effects of the COVID-19 pandemic.

== AFL career ==
=== Fremantle (2021–) ===
==== 2021 season ====
Treacy was recruited by Fremantle with their first selection, 7th overall, in the 2021 rookie draft. He played for Fremantle's reserves team, Peel Thunder, in the West Australian Football League (WAFL) during the pre-season, and was suspended for two games for striking former Fremantle player Brady Grey during one of the games. Due to a misalignment of the WAFL and AFL season, the two week suspension was initially thought to be effectively four weeks, until the AFL made a ruling that the suspension to play for Fremantle for shall be considered as two weeks of the AFL season, not the WAFL season. He made his AFL debut during the fourth round of the 2021 AFL season against Hawthorn. Treacy kicked a game-high three goals in round 12 during Fremantle's match against the Western Bulldogs at Optus Stadium. He finished his debut season having played 15 games and kicked 13 goals.

==== 2022 season ====
Treacy had a frustrating start to the 2022 AFL season, suffering a groin injury during pre-season. Injuries to both his ankles as well as contracting glandular fever saw his season restricted to four games.

==== 2023 season ====
Treacy made his return during round one of the 2023 AFL season, against St Kilda, after a strong pre-season. Treacy kicked 2 goals in round 9 during Fremantle's 17-point win over Sydney at the Sydney Cricket Ground. Treacy kicked 3 goals in round 18 during Fremantle's game against Collingwood at the MCG. He signed a three-year contract extension in 2023, tying him to Fremantle until at least 2026. He finished the season having played a career-high 17 games.

==== 2024 season ====
Treacy made the line-up for Fremantle's opening game of the 2024 AFL season against the Brisbane Lions at Optus Stadium. He finished the game with 12 disposals and three goals in the 23-point come-from-behind win. He kicked three goals within a 5-minute period four weeks later against Port Adelaide at Adelaide Oval, and he finished the game with 16 disposals. His fine form continued throughout the next three weeks, kicking nine goals to sit atop Fremantle's leading goalkicker tally. Treacy kicked a then career-best five goals in round 17 against Richmond at Optus Stadium. He signed a four-year contract extension on 31 July 2024 to keep him at Fremantle until at least 2030. Treacy kicked three goals and collected nine disposals in round 21 against Essendon at the MCG. He suffered a knee injury during the match; consequently, he missed Fremantle's last three games of the season. He finished the year as Fremantle's leading goalkicker, having kicked 45 goals across 20 games in a breakout season, as well as an eighth place finish in the Coleman Medal.

==== 2025 season ====
Treacy was elevated into Fremantle's leadership group ahead of the 2025 AFL season. In round 5, he kicked a career-high six goals in a 61-point win over Richmond at Barossa Park, which was a highlight of his brilliant early season form where he kicked 20 goals in the first 7 games. Treacy played his first career final in their elimination final loss to the Gold Coast. Treacy kicked 2 goals and took 4 contested marks. He finished the season as Fremantle's leading goalkicker for the second year in a row, having kicked 44 goals across 24 games.

==== 2026 season ====
Treacy had a strong start to the 2026 AFL season, ranking number one in the competition for contested marks after Round 3. In Round 22 against Melbourne at the MCG, Treacy kicked his fiftieth goal for the season, becoming just the second Docker to have kicked 50 goals since Matthew Pavlich in 2012, after teammate Jye Amiss had kicked his fiftieth minutes earlier. Treacy finished the home and away season with a career-best 54 goals from 23 games, as well as leading the league for contested marks (47). He also received his first All-Australian selection.

== Statistics ==
Updated to the end of Round 22, 2026.

Legend
G	Goals	K	Kicks	D	Disposals	T	Tackles
B	Behinds	H	Handballs	M	Marks	H/O	Hit-outs

Season	Team	No.	Games	Totals								Averages (per game)								Votes
Season	Team	No.	Games	G	B	K	H	D	M	T	H/O	G	B	K	H	D	M	T	H/O	Votes
2021	Fremantle	35	15	13	10	70	45	115	51	31	7	0.9	0.7	4.7	3.0	7.7	3.4	2.1	0.5	0
2022	Fremantle	35	4	1	2	19	12	31	10	9	3	0.3	0.5	4.8	3.0	7.8	2.5	2.3	0.8	0
2023	Fremantle	35	17	15	6	86	68	154	58	44	67	0.9	0.4	5.1	4.0	9.1	3.4	2.6	3.9	0
2024	Fremantle	35	20	45	15	158	83	241	122	44	63	2.3	0.8	7.9	4.2	12.1	6.1	2.2	3.2	2
2025	Fremantle	35	24	44	18	186	90	276	120	44	13	1.8	0.8	7.8	3.8	11.5	5.0	1.8	0.5	4
2026	Fremantle	35	21	50	32	191	85	276	135	51	0	2.4	1.5	9.1	4.0	13.1	6.4	2.4	0.0	0
Career			101	168	83	710	383	1093	496	223	153	1.7	0.8	7.0	3.8	10.8	4.9	2.2	1.5	6
