= List of Fremantle Football Club coaches =

Since becoming a member of the Australian Football League (AFL) in 1995, there have been six permanent senior coaches of the Fremantle Football Club men's team, and three of the women's team. There have also been three caretaker coaches, who coached for short periods after the permanent coach was sacked or unavailable.

The Fremantle Women's football team has played in the AFL Women's league since its inauguration in 2017. Michelle Cowan was the inaugural coach, before her resignation in April 2017. Trent Cooper coached the team from the 2019 AFL Women's season until he was replaced by former player Lisa Webb in 2023.

== AFL ==
Statistics current to completion of the 2026 AFL season

Men's team
| # | Coach | Seasons | Total games | | | | | Finals games | | | | Achievements |
| # | Coach | Seasons | G | W | L | D | Win% | G | W | L | Win% | Achievements |
|---|---|---|---|---|---|---|---|---|---|---|---|---|
| 1 | Gerard Neesham | 1995–1998 | 88 | 32 | 56 | 0 | 36.4 | — | — | — | — | |
| 2 | Damian Drum | 1999–2001^{[a]} | 53 | 13 | 40 | 0 | 24.5 | — | — | — | — | |
| 3 | Chris Connolly | 2002–2007^{[b]} | 129 | 67 | 62 | 0 | 51.9 | 4 | 1 | 3 | 25.0 | |
| 4 | Mark Harvey | 2007^{[b]}–2011^{[c]} | 97 | 39 | 58 | 0 | 40.2 | 2 | 1 | 1 | 50.0 | |
| 5 | Ross Lyon | 2012–2019^{[d]} | 184 | 96 | 87 | 1 | 52.4 | 9 | 4 | 5 | 44.4 | 2013 Runners-up; 2015 Minor Premiers |
| 6 | Justin Longmuir | 2020– | 158 | 90 | 66 | 2 | 57.6 | 7 | 3 | 4 | 42.9 | 2026 Minor Premiers; 2026 Runners-Up |

=== Acting/Acting/Caretaker coaches ===
| # | Coach | Seasons | Total games | | | | | Finals games | | | |
| # | Coach | Seasons | G | W | L | D | Win% | G | W | L | Win% |
|---|---|---|---|---|---|---|---|---|---|---|---|
| 1 | Ben Allan | 2001^{[a]} | 13 | 2 | 11 | 0 | 18.2 | — | — | — | — |
| 2 | David Hale | 2019^{[d]} | 1 | 0 | 1 | 0 | 0.0 | — | — | — | — |
| 3 | Jaymie Graham | 2022^{[e]} | 2 | 2 | 0 | 0 | 100.0 | — | — | — | — |

== AFL Women's ==
Statistics current to round 4 of the 2025 AFLW season

Women's team
| # | Coach | Seasons | Total games | | | | | Finals games | | | | Achievements |
| # | Coach | Seasons | G | W | L | D | Win% | G | W | L | Win% | Achievements |
|---|---|---|---|---|---|---|---|---|---|---|---|---|
| 1 | Michelle Cowan | 2017–2018 | 14 | 4 | 9 | 1 | 32.1 | — | — | — | — | |
| 2 | Trent Cooper | 2019–2022 (S7) | 47 | 30 | 16 | 1 | 64.9 | 5 | 2 | 3 | 40.0 | |
| 3 | Lisa Webb | 2023– | 27 | 14 | 13 | 0 | 51.9 | 2 | 1 | 1 | 50.0 | |

=== Key ===
| # | Number of coaches |
| G | Games coached |
| W | Wins |
| L | Losses |
| D | Draws |
| Win% | Winning percentage |
| † | Caretaker coach |

== Notes ==
- ^{a} Damian Drum was sacked as the Fremantle coach following the club's round 9 defeat to Sydney, their 10th consecutive loss. Ben Allan was appointed caretaker coach for the remainder of the 2001 season but had declared that he had no intention of applying for the senior coach's job for the 2002 season, and Chris Connolly was appointed at the end of the 2001 season.
- ^{b} Chris Connolly resigned as the Fremantle coach following the club's round 15 loss to Kangaroos. Mark Harvey (then an assistant coach at FFC) was appointed caretaker coach for the remainder of the 2007 season, and as a result of his success (four wins from his seven matches), he was given the permanent position as Fremantle's coach.
- ^{c} Mark Harvey was sacked in controversial circumstances at the end of the 2011 season, with a year left on his contract, in a surprise move that saw Ross Lyon resign from St Kilda to take up the post.
- ^{d} David Hale coached the final round of the 2019 AFL season after Ross Lyon was sacked as coach.
- ^{e} Jaymie Graham was appointed the fill-in coach for the Round 3 and 4 matches in 2022 when Justin Longmuir was required to isolate at home after being declared a close contact of a positive COVID-19 case.
