= Trent Cooper =

Australian rules footballer and coach

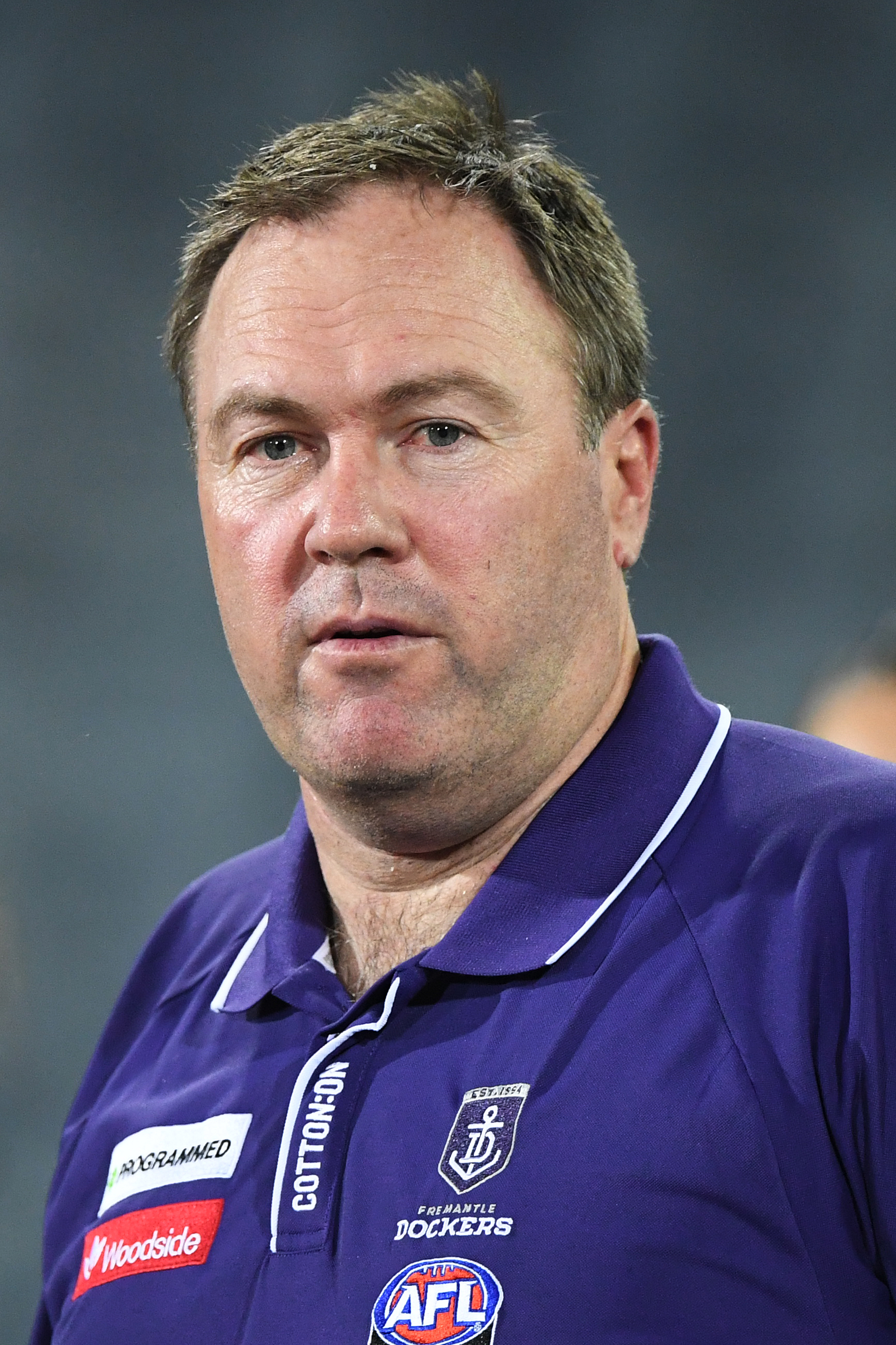
- Cooper coaching Fremantle in January 2019

Personal information
- Full name: Trent Aaron Cooper
- Born: 19 June 1974 (age 52); Midland, Western Australia

Playing career
Years	Club	Games (Goals)
1997–1998	Peel Thunder	14 (7)
1999	Swan Districts	2 (0)
Total		16 (7)

Coaching career^{3}
Years	Club	Games (W–L–D)
2019–2022 (S7)	Fremantle (W)	47 (30–16–1)
- ^{3} Coaching statistics correct as of 2022 (S7).

Trent Aaron Cooper (born 19 June 1974) is a former Australian rules footballer and coach. Cooper was the senior coach of Fremantle Football Club in the AFL Women's (AFLW) for five seasons before departing the club in November 2022 after not being offered a new contract.

== Playing career ==
Cooper played in the West Australian Football League for Peel Thunder in 1997 and 1998, and then for one season with Swan Districts in 1999. Cooper played a total of 16 league games and kicked seven goals over three seasons.

== Coaching career ==
Cooper was announced as Fremantle's coach in June 2018, replacing the Dockers' inaugural AFLW coach, Michelle Cowan.

After Fremantle went through the shortened 2020 AFLW season undefeated, Cooper was awarded the AFL Coaches Association Coach of the Year award.

In his five seasons in charge, Cooper took Fremantle to the finals on four occasions. He was axed by the club in November 2022 after the conclusion of the AFLW's seventh season. In the days following, Cooper described his departure as an "unpopular decision" and reiterated that he disagreed with the call.

Less than a month after leaving Fremantle, Cooper was hired by the West Australian Football Commission in a youth development coaching role.

== Personal life ==
Outside of football, Cooper is a high school maths teacher, having taught at Wesley College and Chisholm Catholic College.
