= Philipa Seth =

Australian rules footballer

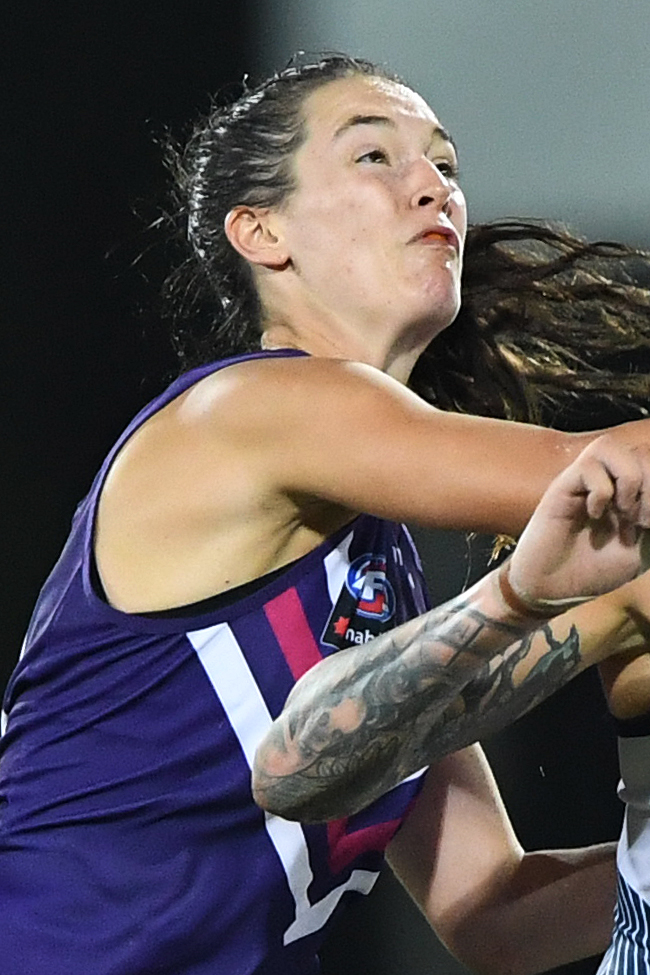
- Seth playing for Fremantle in January 2019

Personal information
- Born: 19 February 1994 (age 32)
- Original team: East Fremantle (WAWFL)
- Draft: No. 28, 2018 AFL Women's draft
- Debut: Round 1, 2019, Fremantle vs. Melbourne, at Casey Fields
- Height: 170 cm (5 ft 7 in)
- Position: Defender

Club information
- Current club: Fremantle
- Number: 18

Playing career^{1}
Years	Club	Games (Goals)
2019–2025	Fremantle	58 (3)
- ^{1} Playing statistics correct to the end of the 2025 season.

Philipa Seth (born 19 February 1994) is an Australian rules footballer playing for the Fremantle Football Club in the AFL Women's (AFLW). Seth was drafted by Fremantle with their third selection and twenty-eighth overall in the 2018 AFL Women's draft. She made her debut in the four point win against Melbourne at Casey Fields in the opening round of the 2019 season.

Seth is a former touch rugby player at the Southern Stars from Perth who spent time in Collie, Western Australia in the South West and works as a physiotherapist.

Seth was awarded Fremantle's best first year player award in 2019, after playing in all 8 games for the season.

Seth retired at the end of the 2025 AFLW Season finishing her career on 58 games and with the 10th most games in Fremantle's AFLW history.
