= Tunisha Kikoak =

Australian rules footballer (born 2005)

Personal information
- Full name: Tunisha Ouvluviac Kikoak
- Nickname: TK
- Born: 12 May 2005 (age 21)
- Original team: Tasmania Devils/North Melbourne
- Debut: Fremantle vs. Essendon, at Windy Hill
- Height: 180 cm (5 ft 11 in)
- Position: Forward

Club information
- Current club: Fremantle
- Number: 37

Playing career^{1}
Years	Club	Games (Goals)
2024–	Fremantle	25 (10)
- ^{1} Playing statistics correct to the end of the 2026 season.

Tunisha Ouvluviac Kikoak (born 12 May 2005) is an Australian rules footballer for the Fremantle Football Club in the AFL Women's (AFLW).

The daughter of Josh, an Inuk man from Inuvik in Northwest Canada, and Kelly, from Australia, Kikoak began playing football in Tasmania where she represented the Tasmania Devils in the Talent League Girls as well as for Old Scotch and North Launceston. She also spent some time playing for North Melbourne in the VFL Women's League.

In June 2024, Kikoak was signed by Fremantle as a replacement player for Kiara Bowers who would miss the upcoming 2024 AFL Women's season due to pregnancy. She made her debut for Fremantle in the opening round against Essendon, before injuring her should in the next game against Adelaide. When Aine Tighe suffered a season ending knee injury in round 4, Kikoak was recalled and has played all games for the remainder of the year, kicking six goals as she replaced Tighe as the main tall forward.
