= Fremantle Football Club =

Australian rules football club

Names
- Full name: Fremantle Football Club Limited
- Nickname(s): Dockers, Freo; Indigenous rounds: Walyalup

2026 season
- After finals: AFL: 2nd
- Home-and-away season: AFL: 1st
- Leading goalkicker: AFL: Jye Amiss (64 goals)
- Doig Medal: AFL: Luke Jackson

Club details
- Founded: 21 July 1994; 32 years ago
- Colours: AFL: Purple White; AFLW: Purple White Crimson
- Competition: AFL: Men; AFLW: Women
- President: Chris Sutherland
- Coach: AFL: Justin Longmuir; AFLW: Lisa Webb
- Captain(s): AFL: Alex Pearce; AFLW: Ange Stannett
- Premierships: 0
- Grounds: AFL: Perth Stadium 2018–present (capacity: 61,266)
- AFLW: Cockburn ARC Oval 2026–present (capacity: 3,000–4,000)
- Former ground: WACA Ground (1995–2000); Subiaco Oval (1995–2017)
- Training ground: Cockburn ARC (2017–present); Fremantle Oval (1995–2017)

Uniforms
Home	Away	Clash

Other information
- Official website: fremantlefc.com.au

The Fremantle Football Club, nicknamed the Dockers or colloquially Freo, is a professional Australian rules football club competing in the Australian Football League (AFL), the sport's elite competition. The team was founded in 1994 to represent the port city of Fremantle, a stronghold of Australian rules football in Western Australia. The Dockers were the second team from the state to be admitted to the competition, following the West Coast Eagles in 1987. Both Fremantle and the West Coast Eagles are owned by WA Football, with a board of directors operating Fremantle on WA Football's behalf.

Despite having participated in and won several finals matches, Fremantle is one of only three active AFL clubs not to have won a premiership (the others being Gold Coast and Greater Western Sydney), with its highest achievements including winning two minor premierships (2015 and 2026) and finishing runners-up in the 2013 and 2026 Grand Finals. High-profile players who forged careers at Fremantle include Hall of Fame inductees Matthew Pavlich and Peter Bell, and dual Brownlow Medal winner Nat Fyfe. The current coach of Fremantle is Justin Longmuir and the captain is Alex Pearce.

Originally based at Fremantle Oval, the club's training and administrative facilities are now located at Cockburn ARC in Cockburn Central, and it plays home games in the AFL at the 60,000-capacity Perth Stadium in Burswood.

Fremantle has also fielded a women's team in the AFL Women's league since the competition's inception in 2017. They are currently coached by Lisa Webb and captained by Ange Stannett. Their most successful season was the 2020 season, in which the team was undefeated, but was ultimately cancelled without a premiership awarded due to the COVID-19 pandemic.

== History ==
=== Background ===
1979 WANFL Grand Final	G	B	Total
East Fremantle	21	19	145
South Fremantle	16	16	112
Venue: Subiaco Oval	crowd: 52,781

The port city of Fremantle, Western Australia has a rich footballing history, hosting the state's first organised game of Australian rules in 1881. Fremantle's first teams, the Fremantle Football Club, the Union/Fremantle Football Club and East Fremantle Football Club, dominated the early years of the West Australian Football League (WAFL), winning 24 of the first 34 premierships.

Since 1897, Fremantle Oval has been the city's main Australian rules football venue. The Fremantle Derby between East Fremantle and South Fremantle is traditionally one of the biggest games on the WAFL calendar, and routinely attracts strong crowds. Until the opening of Perth Stadium in 2018, the record attendance for an Australian rules football game in Western Australia stood at 52,781 for the 1979 WANFL Grand Final between East Fremantle and South Fremantle at Subiaco Oval.

Champion footballers who forged careers playing for Fremantle-based clubs include, among other Australian Football Hall of Fame inductees, Steve Marsh, Jack Sheedy, John Todd, George Doig, William Truscott and Bernie Naylor.

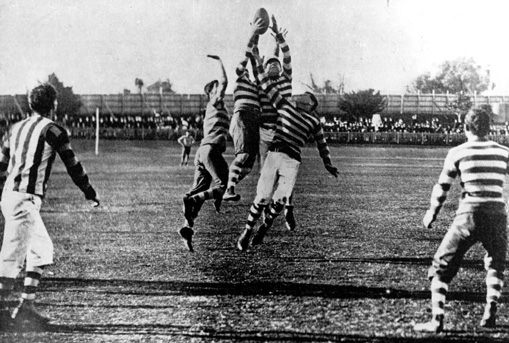
Marking contest from a Fremantle Derby between South Fremantle and East Fremantle, c. 1910

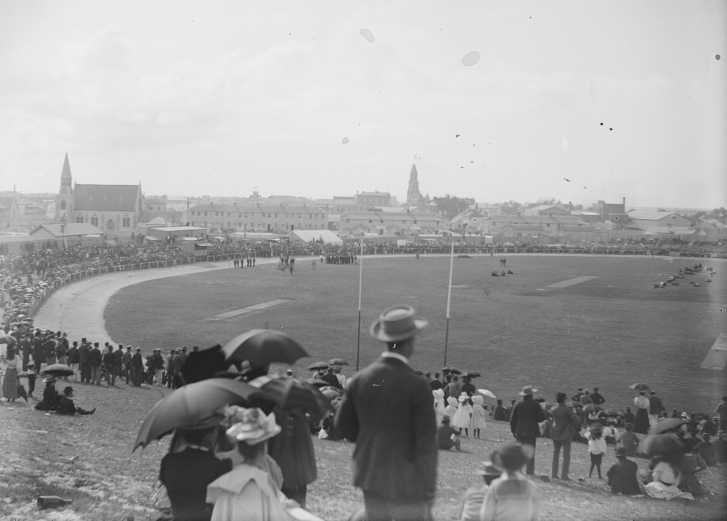
A view over Fremantle Oval and the surrounding buildings, c. 1895

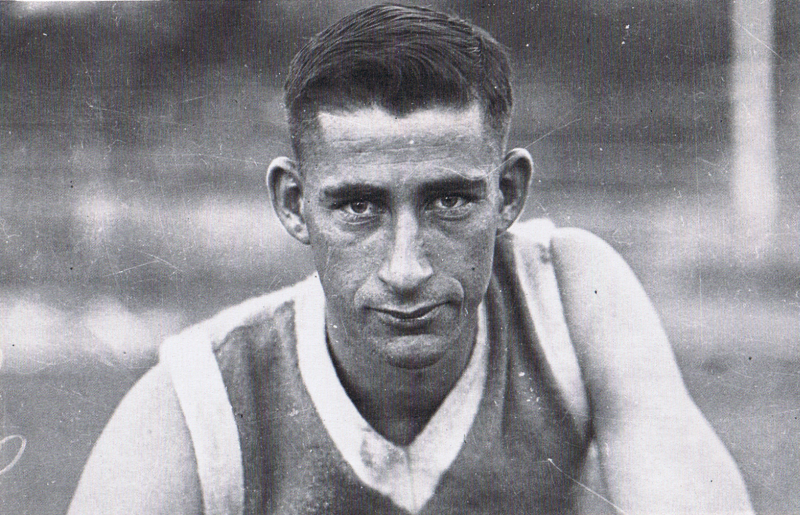
East Fremantle legend George Doig, namesake of Fremantle's Doig Medal

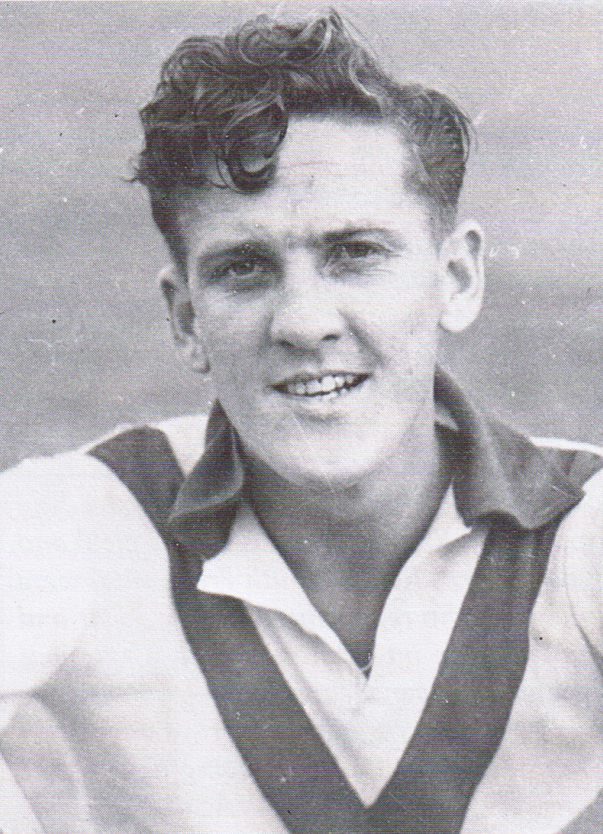
South Fremantle legend Bernie Naylor

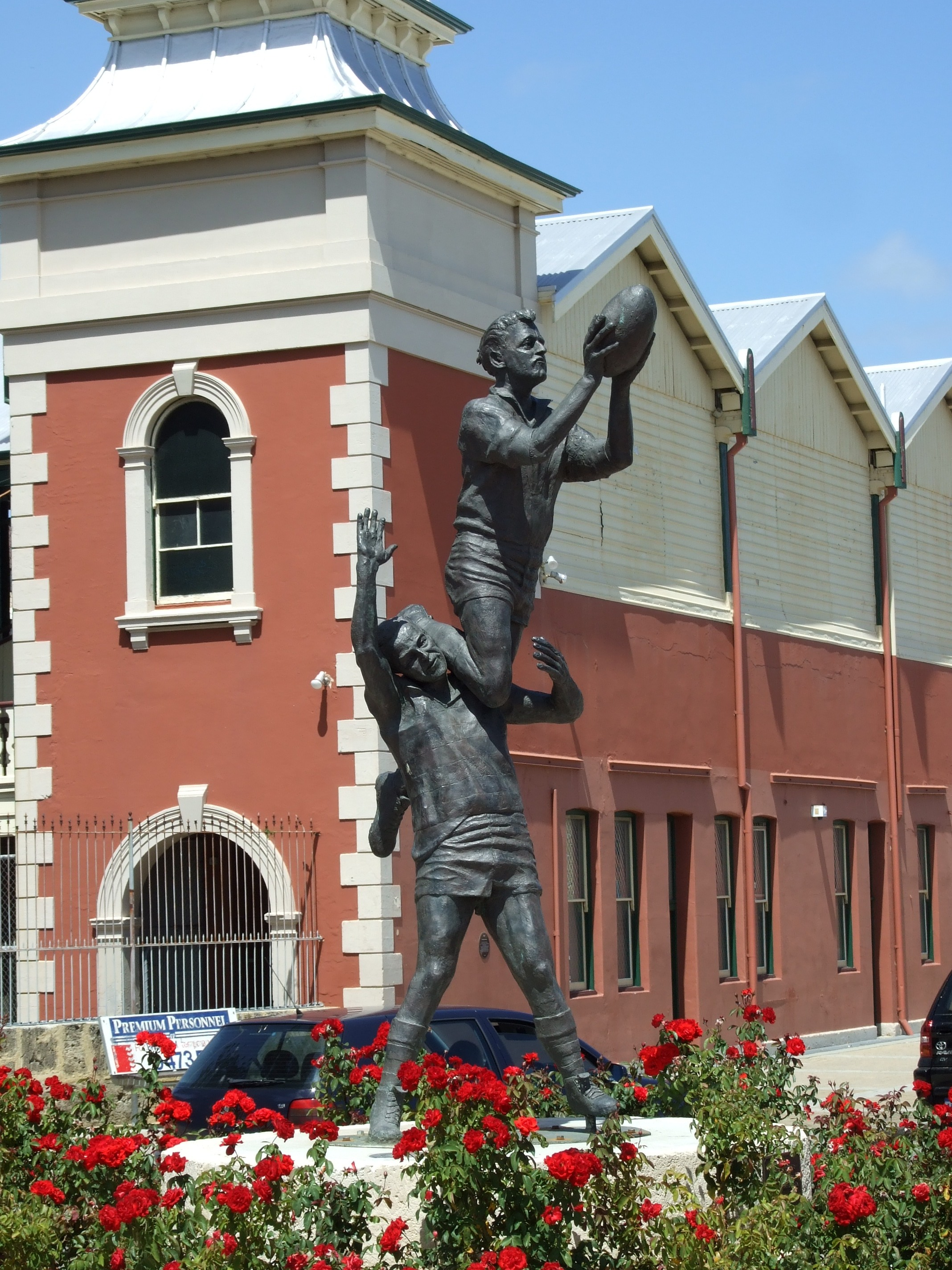
Statue of John Gerovich's mark over Ray French

=== Early years (1993–2006) ===
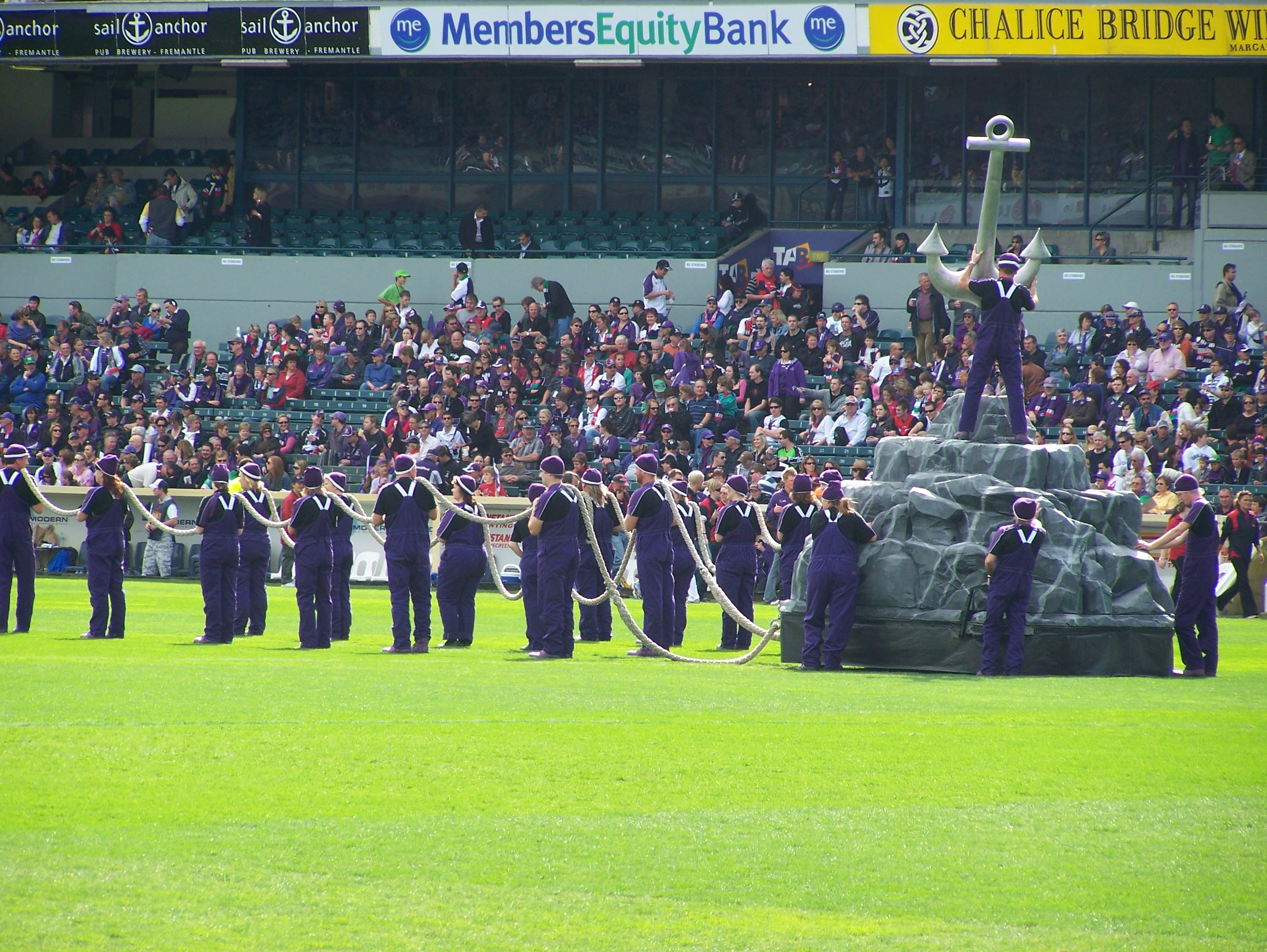
The anchor ceremony, a feature of Fremantle home games during the club's early years

Despite Fremantle's long history of Australian rules football, the expansion of the then-Victorian Football League (VFL) into Western Australia took the form of a single, state-wide team with the creation of the West Coast Eagles in 1987. Soon afterwards, discussions emerged between the East Fremantle and South Fremantle clubs regarding the formation of a second WA-based VFL club as a joint venture. However, exclusive rights clauses in contracts between the Eagles and the VFL made a second Western Australian club legally unfeasible until 1993. Additionally, the proposed joint venture model was opposed by the West Australian Football Commission (WAFC).

On 14 December 1993, the AFL announced that a new team, to be based in Fremantle, would enter the league in 1995, with the provisional name "Fremantle Sharks." The licence had cost the WAFC $4 million. On 21 July 1994, the names "Fremantle Football Club", "Fremantle Dockers" and the club colours of purple, red, green and white were announced.

A first training session for the inaugural squad was held on 31 October 1994 at Fremantle Oval.

The team endured some tough years near the bottom of the premiership ladder, until they finished fifth after the home and away rounds in 2003 and made the finals for the first time. The elimination final against eighth-placed Essendon at Subiaco Oval was then the club's biggest ever game, but ended in disappointment for the home team, with the finals experience of Essendon proving too strong for the young team. They then missed making the finals in the following two seasons, finishing both years with 11 wins, 11 losses and only 1 game outside the top eight.

After an average first half to the 2006 AFL season, Fremantle finished the year with a club-record nine straight wins to earn themselves third position at the end of the home and away season with a club-best 15 wins. In the qualifying final against Adelaide at AAMI Stadium, the Dockers led for the first three-quarters before being overrun by the Crows. The following week saw the club win its first finals game in the semi-final against Melbourne at Subiaco Oval. The club subsequently earned a trip to Sydney to play in its first ever preliminary final, where they lost by 35 points at ANZ Stadium to the Sydney Swans.

=== Grand Final appearance and Lyon era (2007–2019) ===
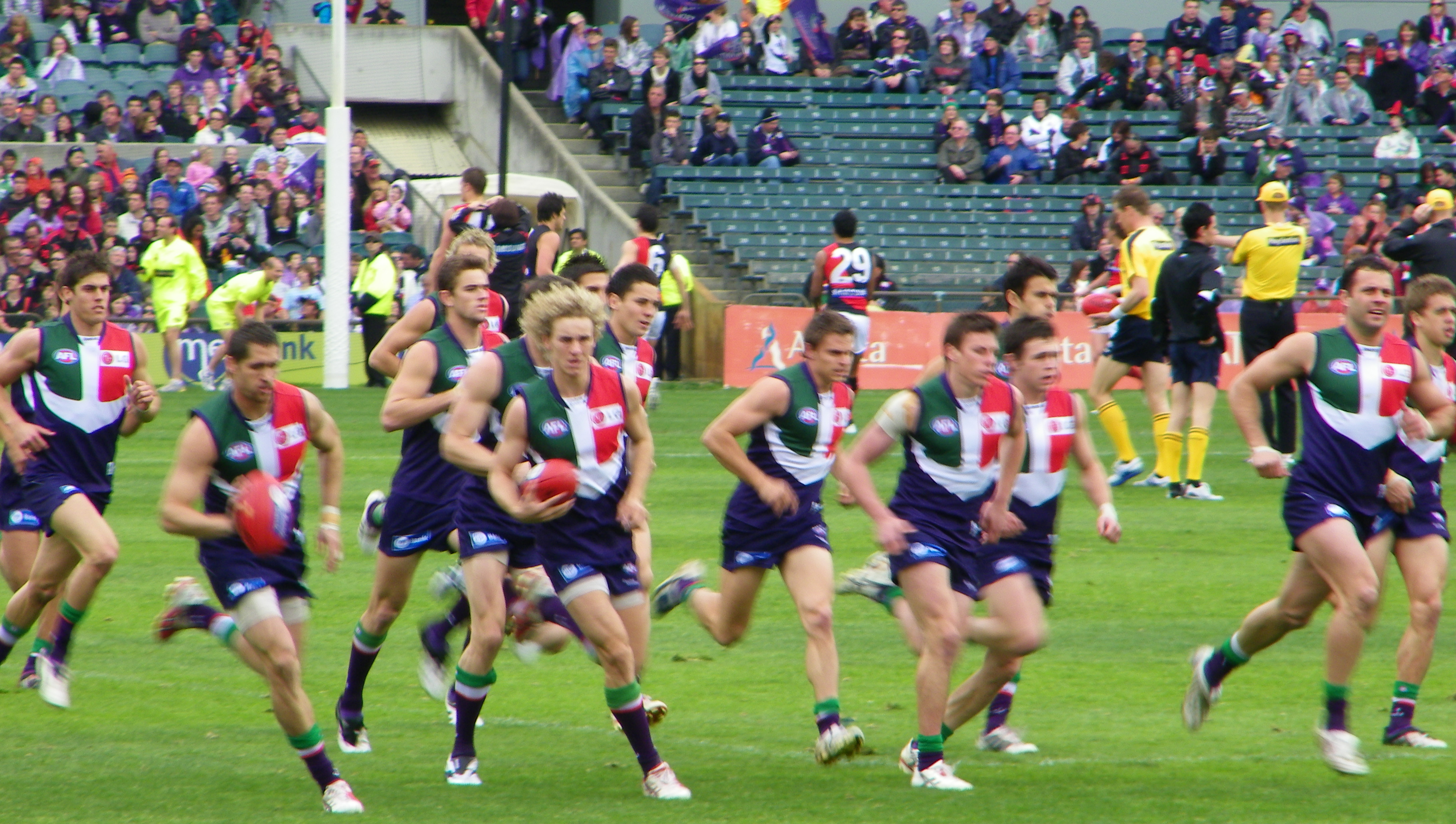
Fremantle players warming up prior to a game in the club's original guernsey, 2009

In 2007, following Chris Connolly's resignation midway through the season, Mark Harvey, a three-time premiership player with Essendon, was appointed caretaker coach for the club. During his seven matches for 2007, Harvey coached the Dockers to four wins and three losses. The club came 11th that year, and Harvey was appointed full-time coach at the end of the season. The following year saw the club slump to 14th.

In Round 15, 2009, Fremantle recorded the lowest score in its history and of the 2000s, scoring only 1.7 (13) to the Adelaide Crows' 19.16 (130). It scored just one point in the first half and the only goal scored came in the third quarter.

After finishing sixth in 2010, the club played in the finals for the first time since 2006. The team played Hawthorn at Subiaco Oval, and despite being considered underdogs, went on to win by 30 points. The win came from strong performances from Luke McPharlin and Adam McPhee who limited the impact of Lance Franklin and Luke Hodge, respectively. The team's second ever win in a finals match qualified them for a semi-final to be played against the Geelong Cats at the MCG the following week. In a one-sided contest, the Dockers lost by 69 points.

The 2011 season saw Fremantle lose just once in the first six rounds before ending the year in 11th position after losing their final seven games. Fremantle's collapse was considered a result of a heavy injury count that began in the pre-season.

In September 2011, Mark Harvey was sensationally sacked by the club in favour of still-contracted St Kilda coach Ross Lyon.

Fremantle qualified for the finals in 2012 after finishing in seventh position. In their elimination final against Geelong, the Dockers won their first ever finals game away from home with a 16-point victory at the MCG behind Matthew Pavlich's six goals. Fremantle subsequently lost to the Crows in Adelaide the following week, ending their finals campaign.

In 2013, Fremantle finished the home-and-away season in third position with a club-best 16 wins. In their qualifying final against the Cats in Geelong, the Dockers produced a first-round upset with a 15-point victory to advance through to a home preliminary final. In the preliminary final, the Dockers defeated the reigning premiers, the Sydney Swans, by 25 points to advance to their maiden AFL Grand Final. In the 2013 Grand Final, the Dockers were defeated by Hawthorn by a margin of 15 points.

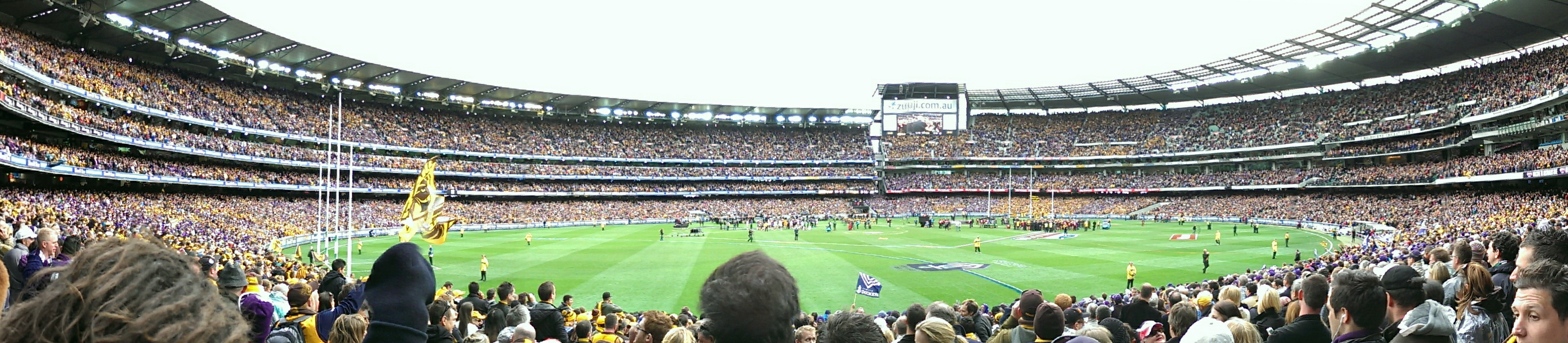
Panorama of the 2013 AFL Grand Final, Fremantle's first grand final appearance

In 2014, the club reached the finals for the third successive year with a top-four finish and 16 wins, but despite earning a double chance, they were knocked out after losses to Sydney away and Port Adelaide at home. Nat Fyfe was awarded the Leigh Matthews Trophy for winning the AFL Players' Association MVP award.

In 2015, the club were crowned minor premiers for the first time in their history, earning their first piece of silverware with the McClelland Trophy. However, the club failed to convert this into a grand final appearance, losing to Hawthorn by 27 points in its home preliminary final. Fremantle ended their season with Nat Fyfe becoming the club's first Brownlow Medalist.

Season 2016 marked Matthew Pavlich's final season in the AFL, as Fremantle missed the finals following a 10-game losing streak to start the year, finishing in 16th position with just four wins.

Ross Lyon was sacked as coach on 20 August 2019 after the club failed to qualify for the finals. He was replaced by Justin Longmuir.

=== Longmuir Era (2020–present) ===
Fremantle's banner on display on Grand Final day, 26 September 2026

Longmuir's first season was during the COVID-19-affected 2020 AFL season, which was shortened from 22 matches to 17. Fremantle would lose their first four games before finding form and finishing 12th on the ladder with 7 wins and 10 losses.

The 2022 AFL season would prove to be a breakout year for the Dockers, who qualified for finals for the first time since the 2015 AFL season and were in contention for a top-4 finish throughout the season before finishing fifth with fifteen wins, six losses, and one draw. Fremantle's return to finals saw them play the Western Bulldogs in an elimination final at Optus Stadium. Fremantle were dominated in the early stages of the game, with the Bulldogs holding a 42–1 lead at the nine-minute mark of the second term. Fremantle would go on to kick 11 of the last 13 goals to win the game by 13 points. Fremantle next faced Collingwood in a semi-final at the MCG in front of a crowd of over 90,000, losing the game by 20 points.

After losing their opening 2 games of the 2023 AFL season, Fremantle recorded their first win in the 56th Western Derby, beating the Eagles by 41 points. Despite a mid-season resurgence, beating both 2022 Grand Finalists in consecutive weeks, the Dockers would fade out to finish 14th on the ladder.

Fremantle had a promising start to the 2024 AFL season, winning their first three games, before two close losses in Adelaide and a shock loss in Western Derby 58 surrounded their season with uncertainty. The Dockers rebounded, losing just one of their next six games before the mid-season bye to sit inside the top eight. They were entrenched inside the top eight for much of the year and were in the top four as late as round 20, before losing their final four matches. This was catalysed by injuries to key position players, including captain Alex Pearce, leading goalkicker Josh Treacy, and starting ruckman Sean Darcy. The Dockers finished 10th with a record of 12 wins, 10 losses and one draw, just half a win behind Carlton in eighth place.

Fremantle opened 2025 with 4–4, before winning 12 of their next 14 games, including a do-or-die victory over the Bulldogs to finish 6th on the ladder. The club's season ended with a one-point loss to the Gold Coast Suns in an elimination final at Optus Stadium, which was also the final game of Nat Fyfe's career.

In 2026 the club massively improved in its performance, winning all 12 of its home games at Optus Stadium on the way to winning its second minor premiership. Their 19 wins included a 14 game winning streak from rounds 2–16. Fremantle played their first game in Bunbury, winning with a 124 point margin against North Melbourne, their greatest margin in club history. The dockers would have an upset loss against Hawthorn in the qualifying final however, Fremantle bounced back by defeating Geelong in the semi final. The Dockers would then end their 13 year grand final drought by defeating the Sydney Swans in the preliminary final to qualify for the 2026 AFL Grand Final, which they lost to the Brisbane Lions 12.17 (89) to 14.12 (96), after leading by 17 points with just over 4 minutes remaining. Shai Bolton was awarded the Norm Smith Medal, the first from a losing side since Chris Judd in 2005, and the first Fremantle player to win it.

== Performance ==
Fremantle's yearly ladder positions

As of the end of the 2026 season, Fremantle holds an overall win percentage of 47.24%, ranking 13th out of the 21 clubs to have competed in the VFL/AFL. Fremantle is also the oldest of the three active clubs yet to win a premiership. The Dockers' most successful period thus far came between 2013 and 2015, during which they secured three consecutive top-four finishes, made their first grand final appearance (2013) and won their first minor premiership (2015). After losing an elimination final in 2025, its first finals appearance since 2022, Fremantle claimed their second minor premiership in 2026 and earned its second Grand Final berth.

=== Year-by-year performance ===
	Home and away						Finals				Coach
Year	P	W	D	L	%	Rank	P	W	L	Rank	Coach
2026	23	19	0	4	137.2	1/18	4	2	2	2/18	Longmuir
2025	23	16	0	7	109.0	6/18	1	0	1	8/18	Longmuir
2024	23	12	1	10	111.9	10/18				10/18	Longmuir
2023	23	10	0	13	96.68	14/18				14/18	Longmuir
2022	22	15	1	6	117.00	5/18	2	1	1	6/18	Longmuir
2021	22	10	0	12	86.50	11/18				11/18	Longmuir
2020	17	7	0	10	93.72	12/18				12/18	Longmuir
2019	22	9	0	13	91.90	13/18				13/18	Lyon/Hale
2018	22	8	0	14	76.24	14/18				14/18	Lyon
2017	22	8	0	14	74.40	14/18				14/18	Lyon
2016	22	4	0	18	74.28	16/18				16/18	Lyon
2015	22	17	0	5	118.73	1/18	2	1	1	3/18	Lyon
2014	22	16	0	6	130.40	4/18	2	0	2	6/18	Lyon
2013	22	16	1	5	134.10	3/18	3	2	1	2/18	Lyon
2012	22	14	0	8	115.67	7/18	2	1	1	6/18	Lyon
2011	22	9	0	13	83.11	11/17				11/17	Harvey
2010	22	13	0	9	103.88	6/16	2	1	1	6/16	Harvey
2009	22	6	0	16	77.34	14/16				14/16	Harvey
2008	22	6	0	16	93.73	14/16				14/16	Harvey
2007	22	10	0	12	102.55	11/16				11/16	Connolly/Harvey
2006	22	15	0	7	109.83	3/16	3	1	2	3/16	Connolly
2005	22	11	0	11	100.15	10/16				10/16	Connolly
2004	22	11	0	11	100.64	9/16				9/16	Connolly
2003	22	14	0	8	103.13	5/16	1	0	1	7/16	Connolly
2002	22	9	0	13	88.33	13/16				13/16	Connolly
2001	22	2	0	20	72.02	16/16				16/16	Drum/Allan
2000	22	8	0	14	72.04	12/16				12/16	Drum
1999	22	5	0	17	82.44	15/16				15/16	Drum
1998	22	7	0	15	76.37	15/16				15/16	Neesham
1997	22	10	0	12	91.90	12/16				12/16	Neesham
1996	22	7	0	15	92.28	13/16				13/16	Neesham
1995	22	8	0	14	92.85	13/16				13/16	Neesham
Total/Avg	703	332	3	368	95.18		21	9	12		
Overall	724	341	3	380	95.07						
P = Played, W = Win, D = Draw, L = Loss, % = Score for/Score against. Source: AFL Tables

== Club identity ==
=== Nicknames and Indigenous name ===
Fremantle Football Club logo (1999–2010)

The club is nicknamed the "Dockers" in reference to Fremantle's maritime and dockworker heritage. Shortly after the club was launched in 1994, Levi Strauss & Co., which produces the Dockers brand of clothing, challenged the club's right to use the name "Fremantle Dockers", specifically on clothing. As a result, the club and the AFL discontinued the official use of the "Dockers" nickname in 1997. However, it remained in common usage both inside and outside the club, and continued to appear in the official team song "Freo Way to Go" and as the title of the official club magazine Docker. In 2010, the club secured rights from Levi Strauss & Co to officially use the nickname "Dockers" across all branding and merchandise. This name change was made in conjunction with changes to the club logo and playing strip.

When board members raised concerns in 1993 about perceived links to the Federated Ship Painters and Dockers Union, which was then embroiled in criminal investigations, inaugural chairman Ross Kelly and CEO David Hatt came up with a fictional origin to reassure them: that the name came from the Fremantle Doctor, a sea breeze supposedly once called the "Fremantle Docker". This "white lie" helped the name gain acceptance and has since become part of club folklore.

During the 2022 finals, the tongue-in-cheek nickname "Flagmantle" came to symbolise fans' hope or belief that the club is destined for a premiership. Since 2023, during the Sir Doug Nicholls and AFLW Indigenous Rounds, Fremantle plays as Walyalup ("place of the woylie"), the traditional Noongar name for the Fremantle area.

=== Motto ===
The official club motto is "Forever Freo". During Indigenous Rounds, the club also uses the Noongar translation, "Kalyakoorl Walyalup".

Another popular phrase is "Wharfie Time", which originated during a 2009 match when a TV broadcast picked up captain Matthew Pavlich rallying his teammates with the line: "Put on your Superman capes, boys. It's wharfie time." Initially met with bemused reactions from commentators, the phrase was embraced by fans and has become an informal club motto. During close games at Perth Stadium, "Wharfie Time" is shown on the big screens, accompanied by the bell from AC/DC's "Hells Bells".

=== Guernsey ===
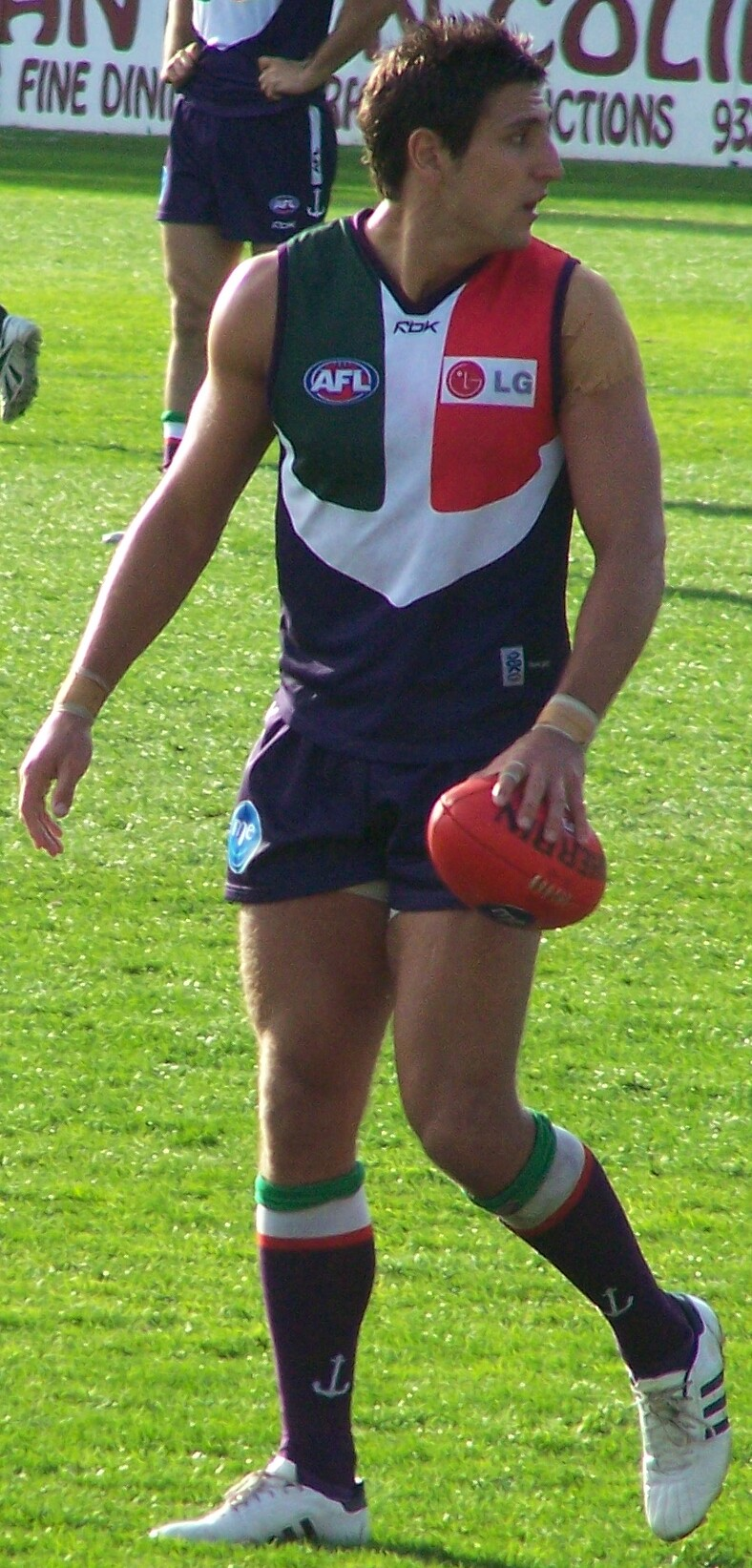
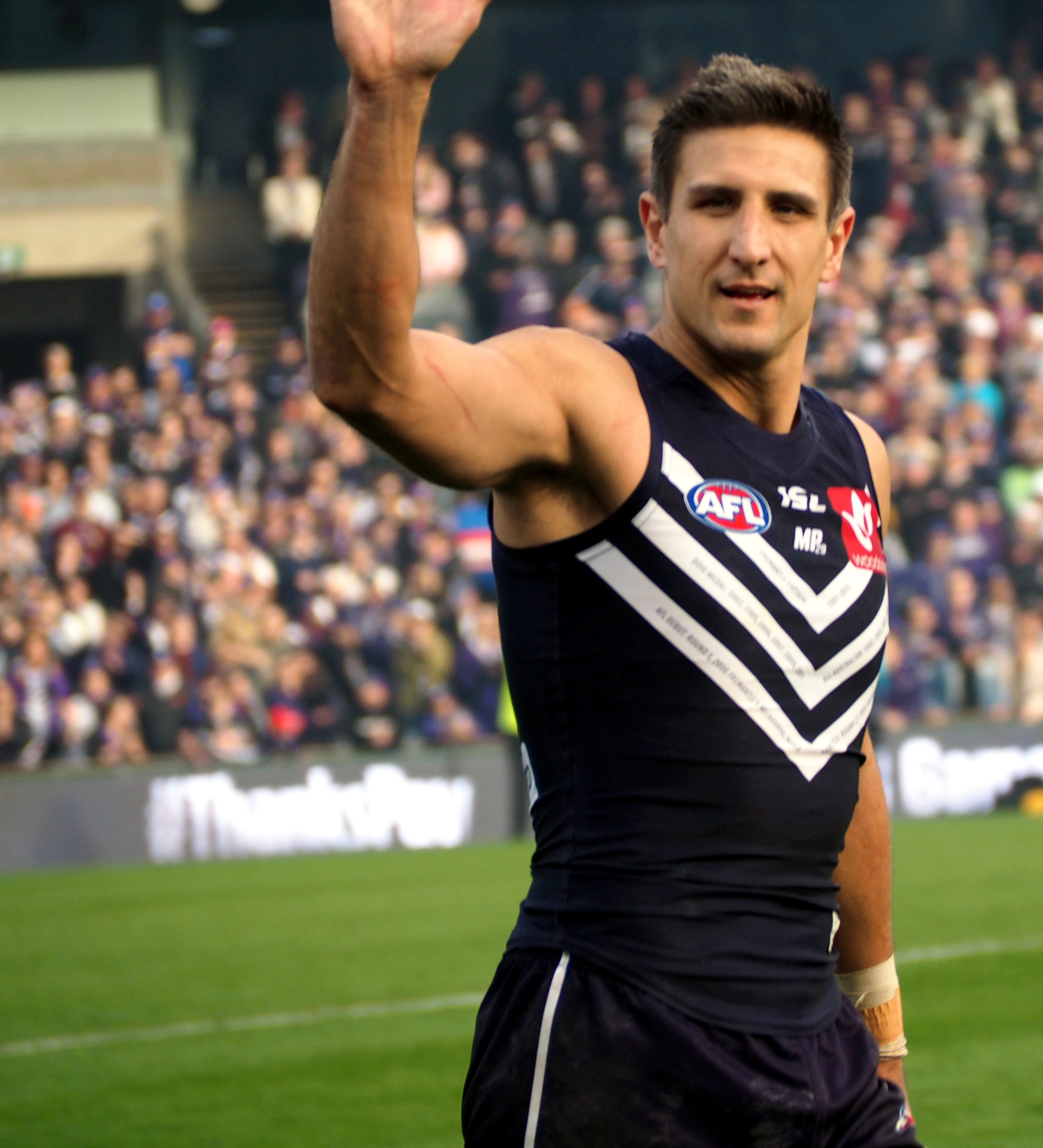
Matthew Pavlich wearing the club's original anchor guernsey in 2006 (left), and the club's current chevron guernsey in 2016 (right).

Until 2011 the Dockers used the anchor symbol as the basis for all of their guernseys. The home guernsey was purple, with a white anchor on the front separating the chest area into red and green panels, representing the maritime port and starboard colours. The colours also acknowledged Fremantle's large Italian community, which historically has been associated with the city's fishing industry. The away or clash guernsey was all white with a purple anchor. In 2008, CEO Steve Rosich confirmed that Fremantle's guernsey would be reviewed as part of wider branding changes, though the club would retain purple as its primary colour. Since 2011, the home guernsey is purple with three white chevrons, and the away jumper is white with purple chevrons. The design was inspired by the club's Heritage Round guernsey, which in turn emulates the jumper worn by the original Fremantle Football Club in 1885.

One game each year is designated as the Purple Haze game, where an all-purple jumper with a white anchor is worn. This game is used to raise money for the Starlight Children's Foundation. After the guernsey re-design to a predominately purple home jumper, Fremantle wore the Starlight Foundation logo, a yellow star, above the highest chevron for their Purple Haze game.

=== Home ground and headquarters ===
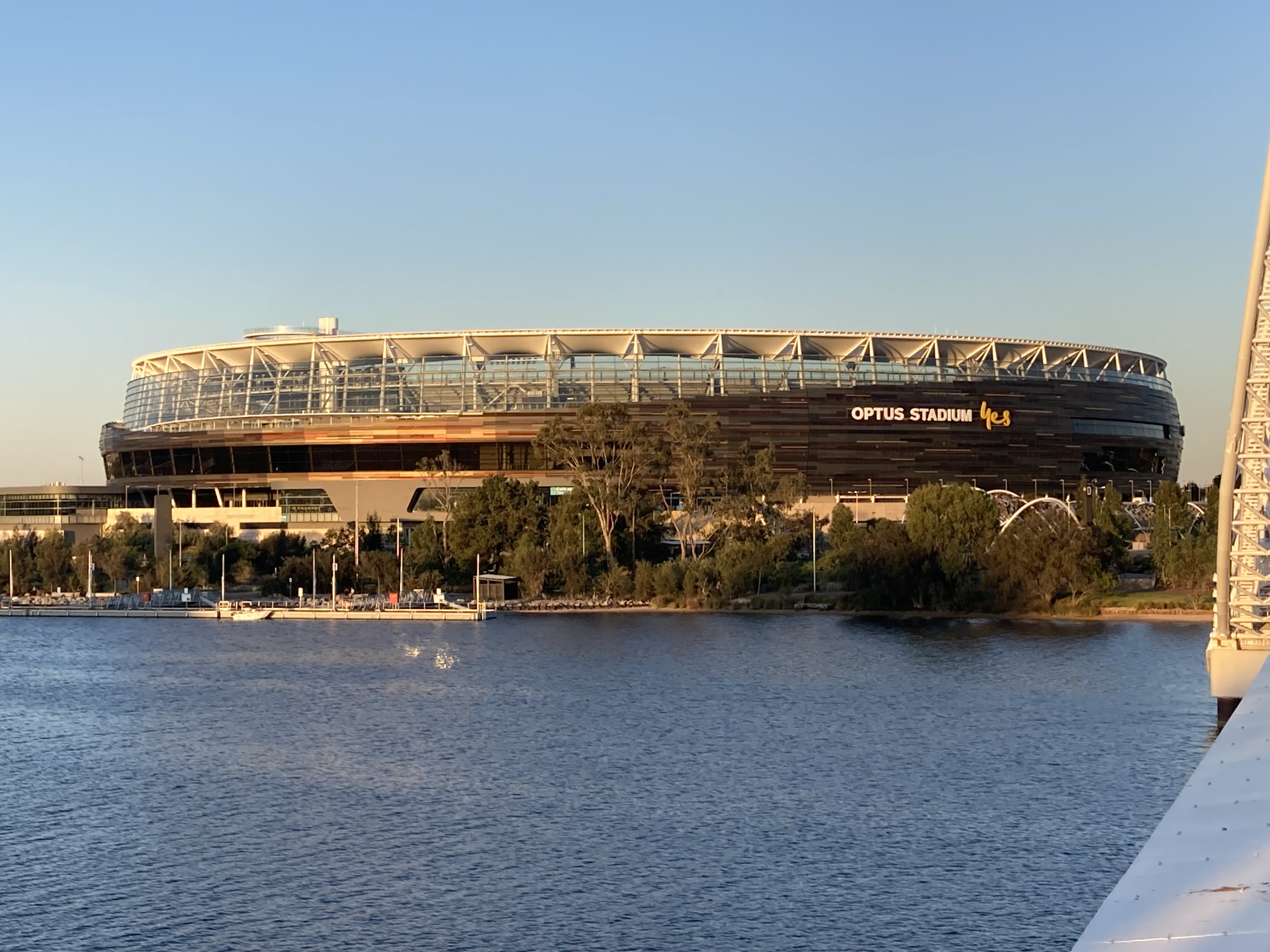
Perth Stadium, Fremantle's home ground

Fremantle Football Club had its original training and administration facilities at Fremantle Oval from 1995 until 2017. On 21 February 2017 the club moved its training and administration facilities to Cockburn ARC, a professional sports training facility and community recreation centre that was constructed in 2015–17 at a price of $109 million, located in the suburb of Cockburn Central.

The team's home games are played at Perth Stadium (commercially known as Optus Stadium), a 61,000 seat multi-purpose stadium located in the suburb of Burswood. The club began playing home matches at the venue in 2018, having previously played home matches at Subiaco Oval from 1995 until 2017 and the WACA Ground from 1995 to 2000.

=== Songs ===
The official song of Fremantle is "Freo Way to Go", a truncated version of the club's original song, "Freo Heave Ho", written by Ken Walther. "Freo Way to Go" was adopted in 2011 following a poll on the Dockers' official website, beating out the original and two newly composed songs: "The Mighty Roar of Freo" by Rosco Elliott, and "Freo Freo", written by Fremantle indie rock group and the Dockers' then-number-one ticket holder, Eskimo Joe. The poll coincided with updates to the club's guernsey and logo.

Unlike other AFL team songs, "Freo Way to Go" is played to a contemporary rock tune. "Freo Heave Ho" also had a section based on Igor Stravinsky's arrangement of the traditional Russian folk song, "Song of the Volga Boatmen", which was dropped in 2011, leaving only the original composition of Walther. Due to its unconventional style, the song is derided by many opposition supporters and defended with equally fierce loyalty by many fans. Author and Fremantle fan Tim Winton boasted: "Every other team song sounds like a 'Knees Up Mother Brown' from previous eras. We've got a backbeat".

Fremantle psychedelic groups Pond and Tame Impala, linked by shared members, have both released tributes to the club. Pond covered "Freo Heave Ho" in 2013, while Tame Impala's Kevin Parker, after being named the club's number-one ticket holder in 2021, released "Go Freo", a hype track now played at three-quarter time at Fremantle's home games. Adding to the Fremantle connection, the song draws inspiration from Bon Scott-era AC/DC.

=== Mascots ===
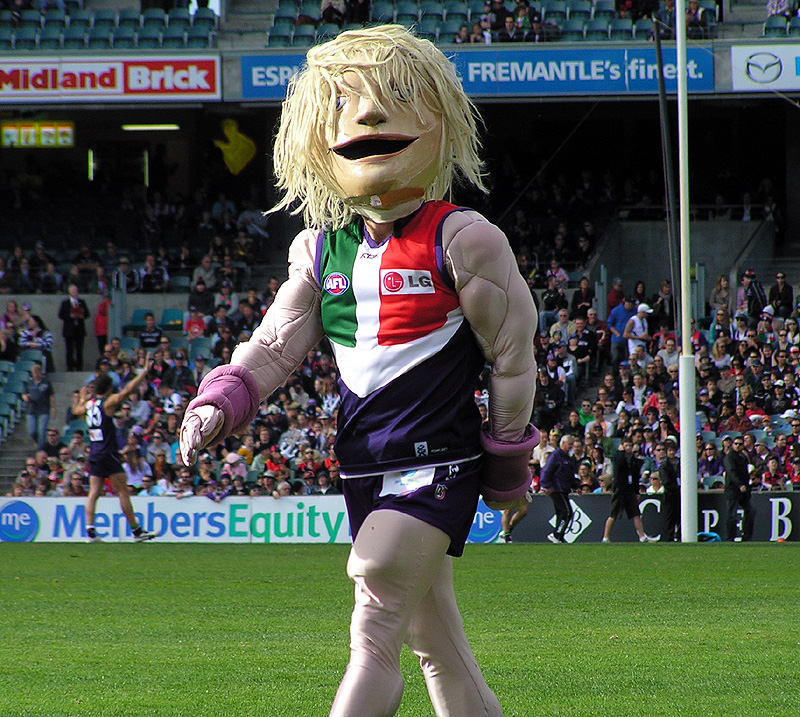
Johnny "The Doc" Docker, Fremantle's official mascot since 2003

- 1995–1999: Grinder – a cartoon-like docker man, in a similar style to Popeye, with a permanent snarl, oversized jaw and muscular arms.
- 2000–2003: The Doc – a straggly blonde-haired mascot, similar in appearance to Fremantle players Clive Waterhouse or Shaun McManus.
- 2003–present: Johnny "The Doc" Docker – a blonde haired surfer with a surfboard under one arm is the Dockers' official mascot in the Mascot Manor promotion for kids.
- 2012–present: Jenny Docker – Johnny's younger sister.
- 2022–present: Dokka the Quokka – a quokka, which is a marsupial native to Rottnest Island, off the coast of Fremantle.

=== Ownership and management ===
The club is owned by the West Australian Football Commission (WAFC). Since 2003, a board of directors controls the operation of the club, on behalf of the WAFC. Prior to this, a two-tier arrangement was in place, with a Board of Management between the board of directors and the commission. The initial club CEO was David Hatt, who had come from a hockey background, and the inaugural club chairman was Ross Kelly, who had played for West Perth. It was a deliberate act by the commission to avoid having administrators from either East Fremantle or South Fremantle in key roles, as they wanted the club to be bigger than just representing Fremantle.

Kelly resigned at the end of 1998, replaced by Ross McLean. Whilst he presided over some key financial decisions, including the building of the club's administrative and training centre at Fremantle Oval and the deferment of the licence fee to the AFL, it was Fremantle's lowest point onfield, culminating in a two-win season in 2001 which saw the coach Damian Drum be sacked mid-year. McLean resigned following an inadvertent breach of the salary cap.

In early 2001 Hatt accepted a government job and Cameron Schwab was appointed. After weathering the fallout from the disastrous 2001 season, Schwab and the new chairman, local West Australian retailing businessman Rick Hart, set about rebuilding the club. A former recruiting manager, Schwab focused on building up the on-field performance by recruiting high-profile players in Trent Croad, Peter Bell and Jeff Farmer, as well as coach Chris Connolly and with Hart then focused on enhancing the corporate and financial standing of the club. The club membership grew every year from 2002 until 2008 and the final licence payment was made to the AFL in 2005.

Schwab chose to return to Melbourne in 2008 and was replaced as CEO by Steve Rosich, who had previously worked for the West Coast Eagles. A year later Hart resigned as president and Steve Harris, who runs The Brand Agency and had produced advertising for Fremantle since 2002, took over at the end of 2009. Harris had been on the board since November 2008, the first club chairman or president to have previously served on the board. The club has developed into one of the wealthiest clubs in the league and their surprise recruitment of Ross Lyon to replace Mark Harvey as coach at the end of the 2011 is seen as an example of their ruthless drive for sustained success. In 2014, Harris resigned as president and was replaced by the then vice president, Perth property developer Dale Alcock. In 2023 Chris Sutherland replaced Dale Alcock as club president, who had served his full tenure as club director and president.

=== Sponsorship ===
==== AFL ====
Year	Kit Manufacturer	Major Sponsor	Shorts Sponsor	Bottom Back Sponsor	Top Back Sponsor	Neckline sponsor
1995	—	Hard Yakka	Alinta Gas	Hard Yakka	—	
1996–97	—	Hard Yakka	HBF Home and Car Insurance	Hard Yakka	—	
1998–99	Adidas	Hard Yakka	—	Hard Yakka	—	
2000	Adidas	Choose Alinta Gas	Southern Land Rover	Alinta Gas	—	
2001	Russell Athletic	Choose Alinta Gas	Ford	Alinta Gas	—	
2002	Russell Athletic	Choose Alinta Gas	—	Alinta Gas	—	
2003	Russell Athletic	Choose Alinta Gas	Bankwest	Alinta Gas	—	
2004	—	Bankwest	Allphones	Bankwest	—	
2005	Reebok	Bankwest	Allphones	Bankwest	—	
2006–08	Reebok	LG	ME Bank	LG	—	
2009	Reebok	LG (Home) Integrated (Away)	ME Bank	Integrated (Home) LG (Away)	—	
2010	Reebok	Woodside Petroleum (Home) Integrated (Away)	ME Bank	Integrated (Home) Woodside Petroleum (Away)	—	
2011	ISC	Woodside Petroleum (Home) Integrated (Away)	ME Bank	Integrated (Home) Woodside Petroleum (Away)	—	
2012–13	ISC	Woodside Petroleum (Home) Programmed (Away)	Programmed	Programmed (Home) Woodside Petroleum (Away)	—	
2014–15	ISC	Woodside Petroleum (Home) Programmed (Away)	Amcom	Programmed (Home) Woodside Petroleum (Away)	—	
2016–2019	ISC	Woodside Petroleum (Home) Programmed (Away)	Choices Flooring	Programmed (Home) Woodside Petroleum (Away)	—	
2020	ISC	Woodside Petroleum (Home) Programmed (Away)	Choices Flooring	Programmed (Home) Woodside Petroleum (Away)	Programmed (Home) Woodside Petroleum (Away)	
2021–2022	Burley-Sekem	Woodside Petroleum (Home) Programmed (Away)	Choices Flooring	Programmed (Home) Woodside Petroleum (Away)	Programmed (Home) Woodside Petroleum (Away)	
2023–present	Burley-Sekem	Woodside Energy (Home) Bankwest (Away)	DP World	Bankwest (Home) Woodside Energy (Away)	Programmed	HostPlus (From Round 21 2023)

==== AFL Women's ====
Year	Kit Manufacturer	Major Sponsor	Shorts Sponsor	Bottom Back Sponsor	Top Back Sponsor
2017–20	Cotton On	Woodside Energy (Home); Programmed (Away)	Choices Flooring	Programmed (Home); Woodside Energy (Away)	–
2021–22 S6	Cotton On	Woodside Energy (Home); Programmed (Away)	Choices Flooring	Programmed (Home); Woodside Energy (Away)	Programmed (Home); Woodside Energy (Away)
2022 S7	Cotton On	Woodside Energy (Home); Programmed (Away)	Choices Flooring	Programmed (Home); Woodside Energy (Away)	Programmed
2023	Cotton On	Woodside Energy (Home); Bankwest (Away)	DP World	Bankwest (Home); Woodside Energy (Away)	Persol

=== Rivalries ===
==== West Coast Eagles ====
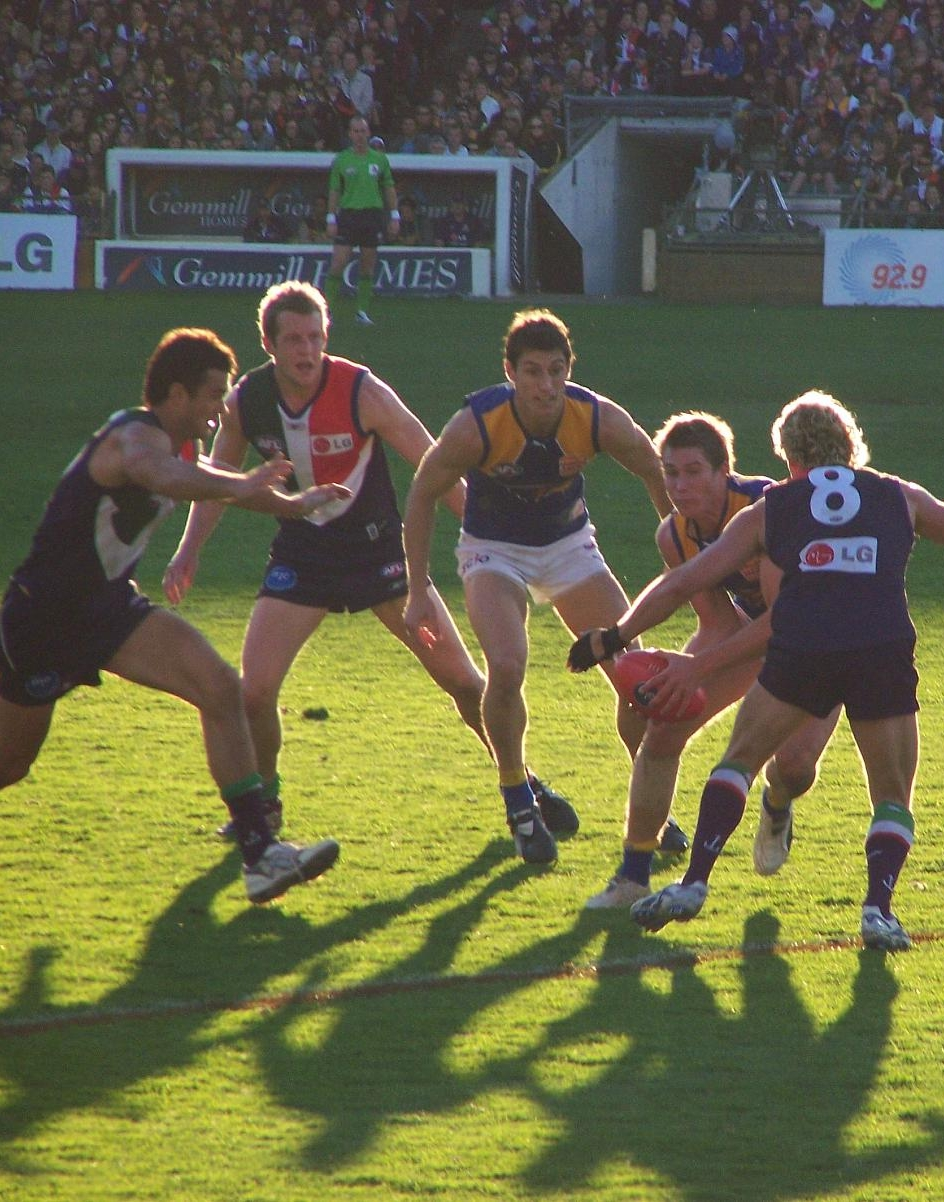
Action from a 2008 Western Derby

Fremantle's biggest rivalry is with the other Western Australian team, the West Coast Eagles, who they play twice each year in the home and away season, in the fiercely contested "Western Derby" matches (pronounced /ˈdɜːrbi/ in Western Australia). West Coast won the first nine encounters, but Fremantle broke the streak with a win in Round 16, 1999. When they met again a year later, Fremantle came back from 42 points down in the third quarter to win by a single point. Dubbed the "Demolition Derby", the match is infamous for its on-field brawls and resulting suspensions and fines, and is now remembered as a turning point in Fremantle's identity and competitiveness. Since then, the rivalry has been relatively even, with Fremantle holding 28 Derby wins overall to West Coast's 33.

==== St Kilda ====
The Dockers and the St Kilda Football Club have had several controversial encounters, most notably in 2006, when a match at Launceston's York Park ended in a dispute dubbed "Sirengate". While the match initially ended in a draw, the AFL overturned the draw result the following Wednesday after the match; the controversy was due to an off-field error made by the timekeepers not sounding the siren for long enough to confirm that the umpires heard it, as well as the siren not being loud enough for the field umpires to hear over the roar of the crowd in the first place, and Fremantle were eventually declared as one-point winners with no protest from St Kilda. It marked the first time a game result had later been overturned since 1900.

During the 2011 off-season, Fremantle sacked coach Mark Harvey and replaced him with then-St Kilda coach Ross Lyon in controversial circumstances. The move was met with much criticism towards Fremantle's president, Steve Harris, and CEO, Steve Rosich, claiming that they had "backstabbed" Harvey. Lyon was also met with widespread criticism and was accused of backstabbing St Kilda by many Saints supporters as the club was made aware that Fremantle had approached Lyon during St Kilda's lead-up to its finals campaign. The two clubs contested a highly anticipated Friday night match in Round 4 of the 2012 AFL season at Etihad Stadium, with Fremantle winning by 13 points and Lyon being booed throughout the match. Lyon became Fremantle's longest serving and most successful coach before being sacked in 2019. He later returned for a second coaching stint at St Kilda in 2023, and his first game back was against Fremantle.

== Players ==
=== Current squad ===
See also Fremantle Football Club drafting and trading history for the complete list of Fremantle's draft selections, delistings and trades

Fremantle Football Club · AFL personnel
Playing list		Inactive list	Coaching staff
2 Jaeger O'Meara; 3 Caleb Serong (vc); 4 Sean Darcy; 5 Heath Chapman; 6 Jordan Clark; 8 Andrew Brayshaw (vc); 9 Luke Jackson; 10 Shai Bolton; 11 Tobyn Murray; 12 Hugh Davies; 13 Luke Ryan; 14 Jeremy Sharp; 15 Adam Sweid; 16 Murphy Reid; 17 Judd McVee; 18 Mason Cox (A); 19 Leon Kickett (A); 20 Patrick Voss; 21 Oscar McDonald	22 Charlie Nicholls; 23 Karl Worner; 24 Jye Amiss; 25 Alex Pearce (c); 26 Hayden Young; 27 Toby Whan (B); 28 Neil Erasmus; 29 Cooper Simpson; 31 Brandon Walker; 32 Michael Frederick; 34 Corey Wagner; 35 Josh Treacy; 36 Brennan Cox; 37 Josh Draper; 42 Aiden Riddle (A); 43 Isaiah Dudley (A); 44 Matthew Johnson; 45 Chris Scerri (A); Dominic Bedendo		Senior coach: Justin Longmuir; Assistant coaches: Tendai Mzungu (back line); Joel Corey (midfield); Harry Garland (stoppages); Jade Rawlings (forward line); Sam Naismith (ruck); Nathan Broad (development – back line); Sam Mainwaring (development – midfield); Chris Mayne (development – forward line); Legend: (c) captain; (vc) vice-captain; (A) Category A rookie; (B) Category B rookie; Updated: 16 November 2026; Sources: Players (rookies); coaches

=== Leadership (Captain/Coach) ===
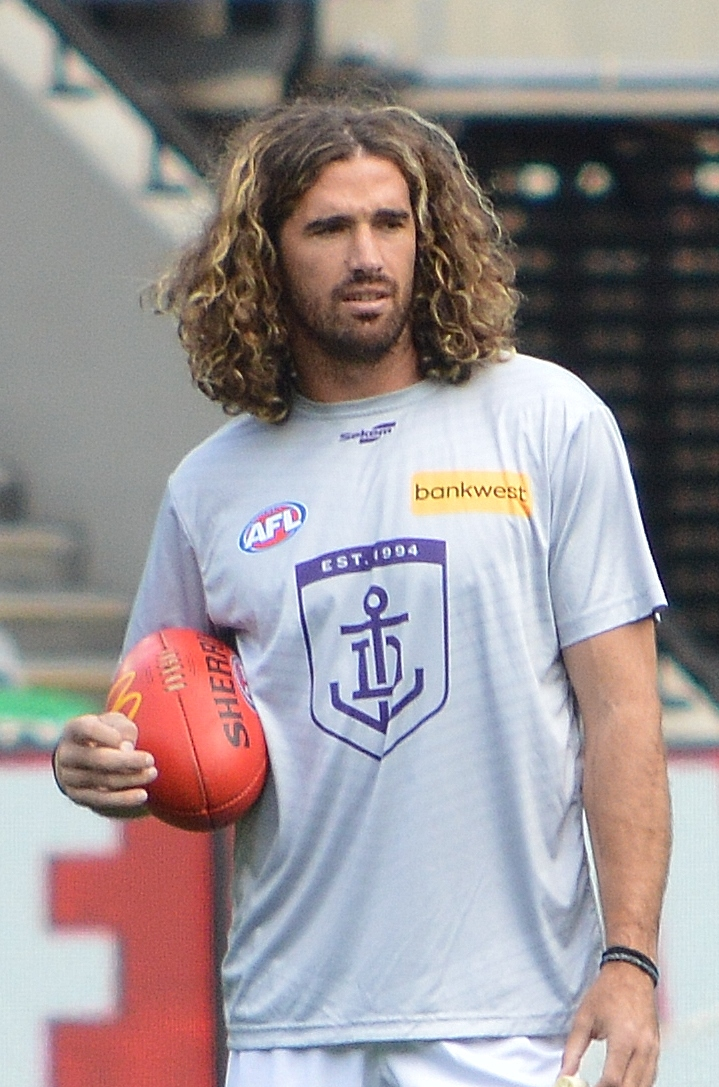
Alex Pearce has captained the club since 2023.

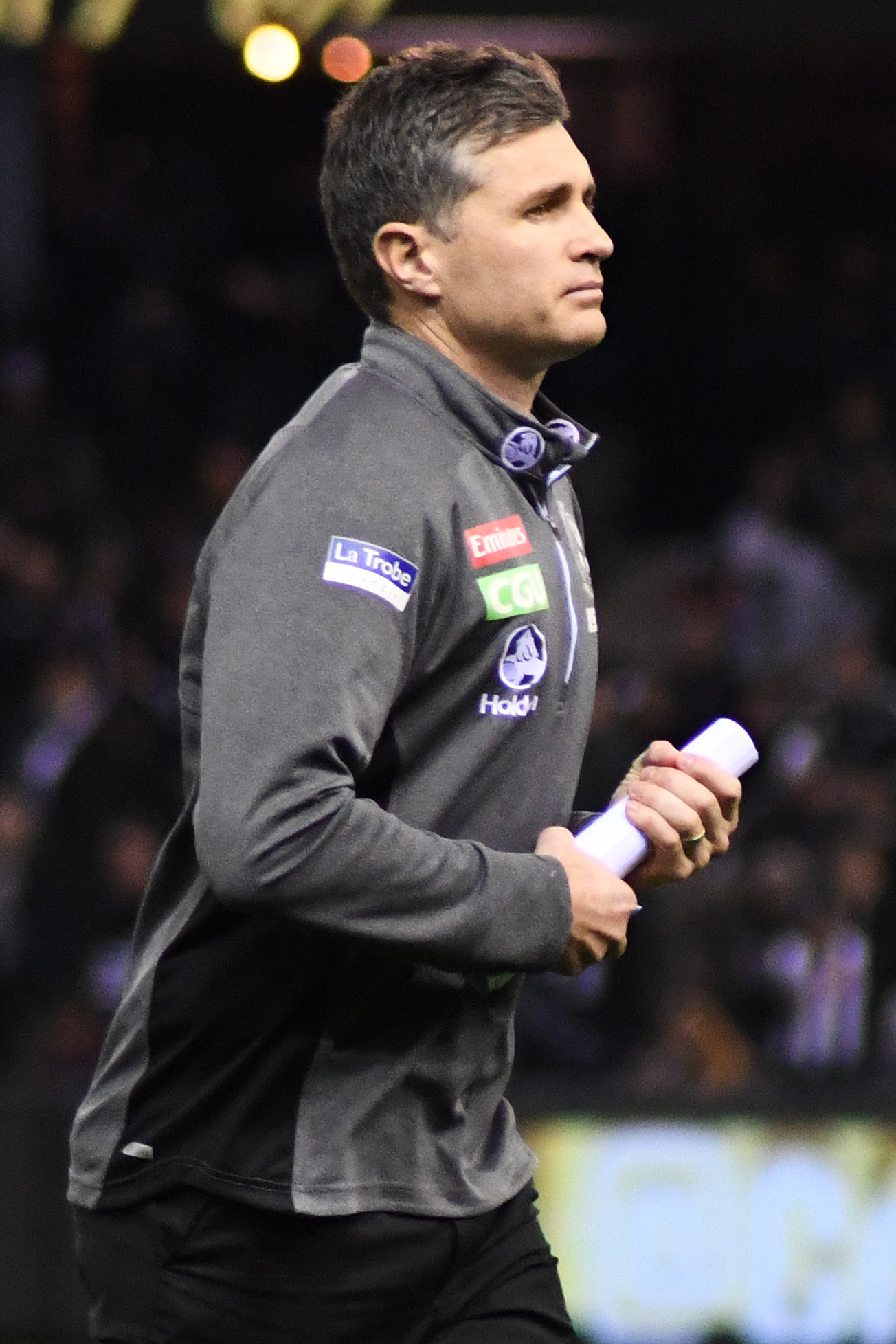
Justin Longmuir, former Fremantle player and current coach

Seasons	Captain	Coach
1995–1996	Ben Allan	Gerard Neesham
1997–1998	Peter Mann	Gerard Neesham
1999	Chris Bond	Damian Drum
2000–2001	Shaun McManus and Adrian Fletcher (co-captains)	Damian Drum/Ben Allan from Rd 10, 2001
2002–2006	Peter Bell	Chris Connolly
2007	Matthew Pavlich	Chris Connolly/Mark Harvey from Rd 16
2008–2011	Matthew Pavlich	Mark Harvey
2012–2015	Matthew Pavlich	Ross Lyon
2016	David Mundy	Ross Lyon
2017–2019	Nathan Fyfe	Ross Lyon/David Hale from Rd 23
2020–2022	Nathan Fyfe	Justin Longmuir
2023–	Alex Pearce	Justin Longmuir

=== Reserves team ===
Following Fremantle's entry into the AFL, players who were not selected for matches in the senior team initially played for various West Australian Football League (WAFL) clubs. Players recruited from the WAFL remained with their original club, and players recruited from interstate were allocated to teams via a draft system. Since the 2014 season, the Peel Thunder Football Club has served as the reserve-aligned club for Fremantle, an arrangement which sees Fremantle's AFL-listed players not selected for the AFL team playing in the WAFL for Peel. An attempt in 2013 to field a standalone Fremantle reserves side in the WAFL was rejected by the other WAFL clubs. A similar host club system was used in 1999 when South Fremantle was the aligned club but was cancelled after a single season.

Despite West Coast eventually being granted a reserves team in the WAFL in 2020, Fremantle's partnership with Peel has continued successfully, with the two clubs committing to retain the relationship until at least 2029. The partnership has been involved in four Peel premierships, in 2016, 2017, 2024 & 2026.

== AFL Women's team ==
=== History ===
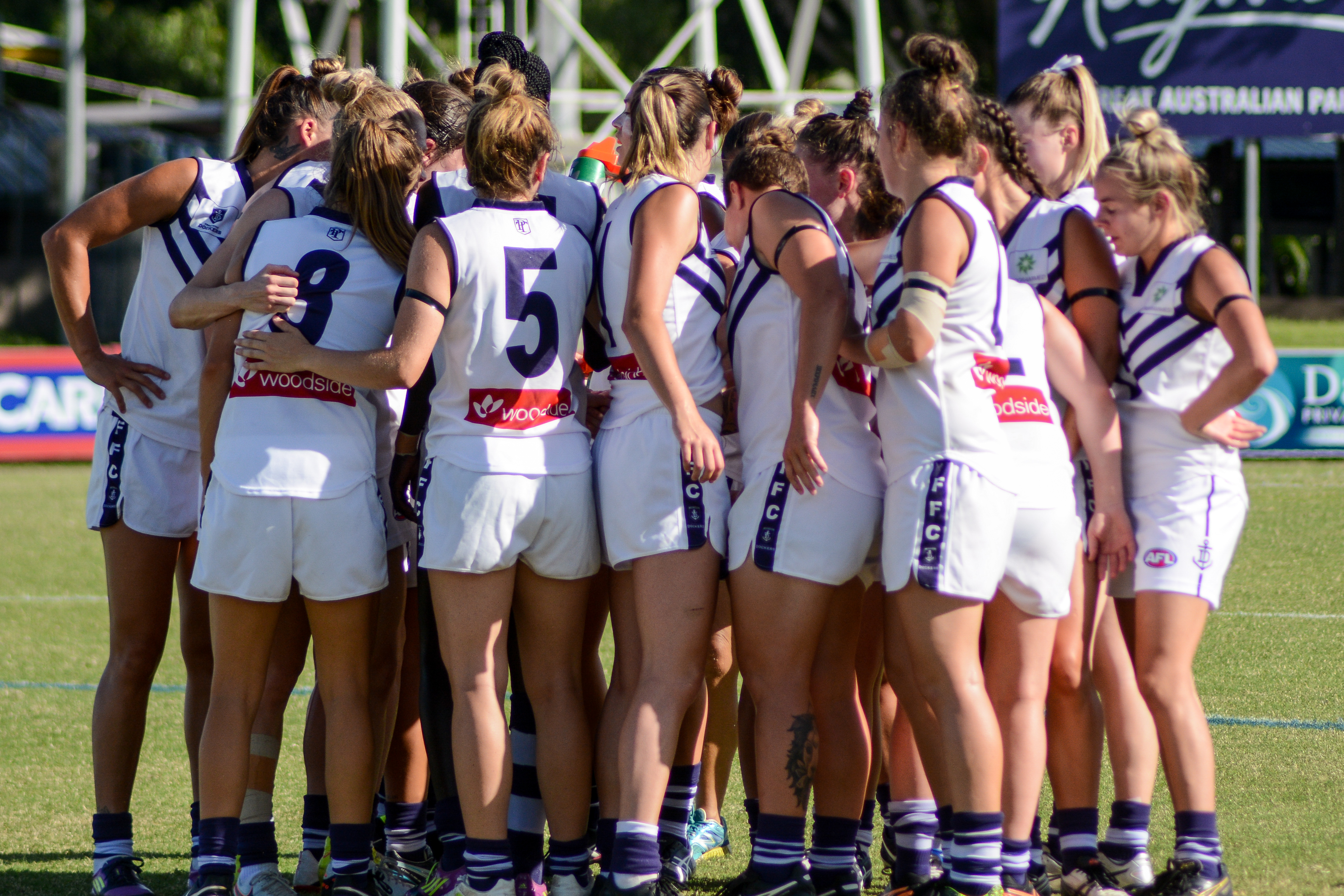
Fremantle AFL Women's team huddle prior to a practice match in January 2017

In May 2016, the club launched a bid to enter a team in the inaugural AFL Women's season in 2017. As part of the bid, the team would guarantee all players education and job opportunities with the club and the partnering Curtin University.

Fremantle beat out a bid from rivals West Coast when they were granted a licence on 15 June 2016.

Kiara Bowers and Kara Antonio were the club's first signings, unveiled along with the league's other 14 marquee players on 27 July 2016. A further 24 senior players and two rookie players were added to the club's inaugural list in the league's drafting and signing period.

Former South Fremantle assistant coach, Michelle Cowan was appointed the team's inaugural head coach in July 2016.

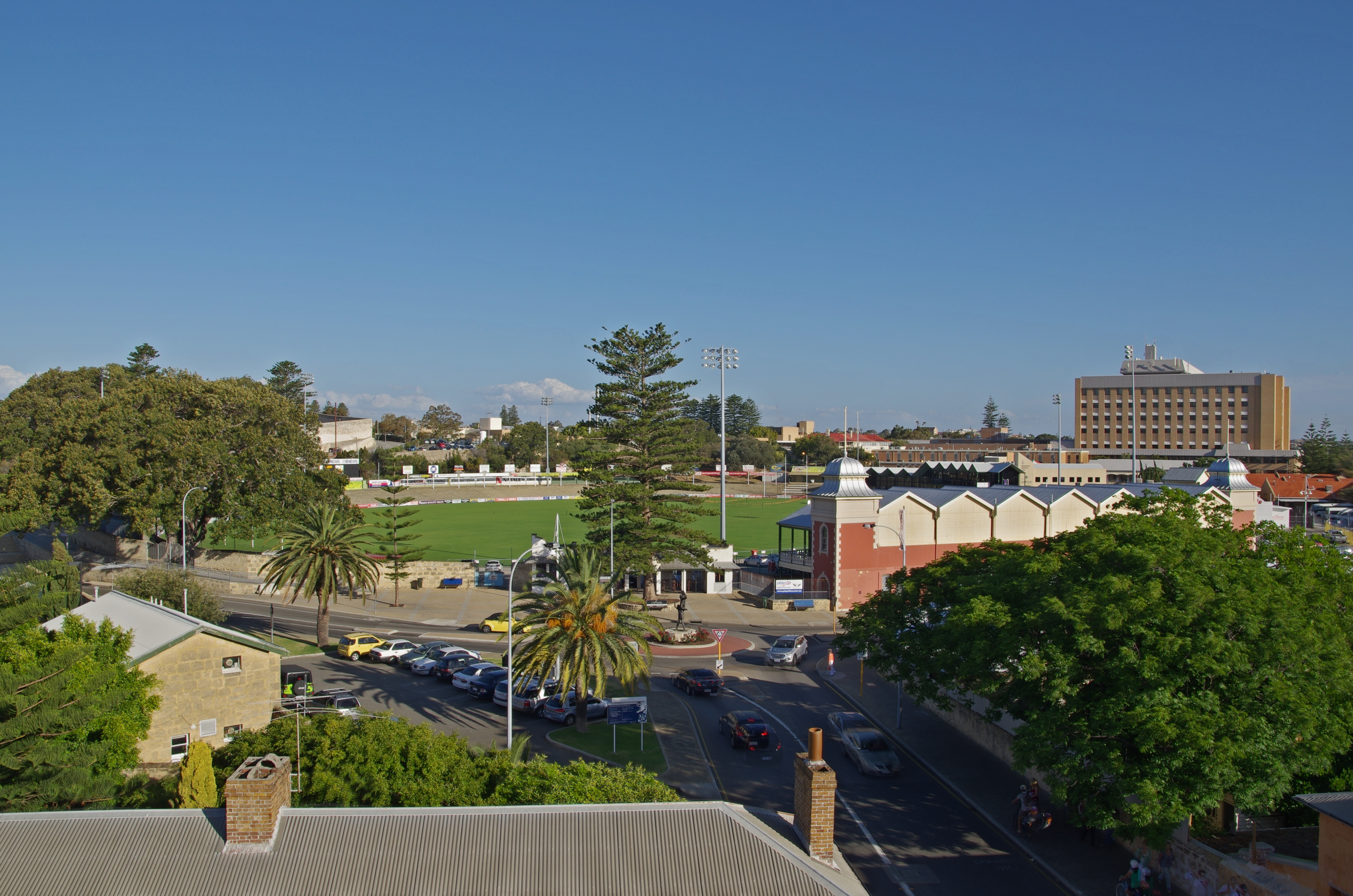
The AFLW squad formerly played its home matches at Fremantle Oval, the club's spiritual home.

The club's initial bid outlined plans for a game each at Domain Stadium and at Curtin University's Bentley campus as well as up to two remaining matches held at the club training base in the city of Cockburn. The club eventually played two home games at Fremantle Oval, one at Domain Stadium and one in Mandurah. In 2018, the Dockers hosted the first football game at Perth Stadium but played the remainder of their home games at Fremantle Oval.

The Dockers struggled in their inaugural season, only winning one of seven games and finishing seventh out of eight teams on the ladder. They fared slightly better in 2018, winning three matches, but again finished seventh on the ladder.

In 2019, Fremantle had one of their most successful seasons, losing only one game during the home-and-away matches (to eventual premiers Adelaide) and making the finals for the first time. The team, now coached by Trent Cooper and with Kiara Bowers making her long-awaited debut after two injury-affected years, started the year with a high-scoring victory over Melbourne in the opening round and kicked their then highest ever score, 10.7 (67), in round 2 against Brisbane. Despite having won two more games than Carlton, the controversial conference system saw Carlton host the knock out preliminary final and inflict Fremantle's second defeat of the year. In the post-season awards, Bowers and Dana Hooker came second behind Erin Phillips in the AFLW MVP award and AFL Women's best and fairest award, respectively. Bowers, Hooker and Gemma Houghton were all named in the AFL Women's All-Australian team. Ashley Sharp was awarded goal of the year for a long-run, multiple-bounce goal.

The 2020 AFL Women's season saw Fremantle go undefeated to sit atop the AFLW ladder for Conference B with a 6–0 record. The Dockers had seven debutants throughout the season, which included ruck Mim Strom and Rising Star nominee Roxy Roux. Notable wins included a victory over a then-undefeated Brisbane Lions in Round 5, courtesy of a four-goal effort from Sabreena Duffy; and a clutch one-point win over St Kilda in Round 4, courtesy of a late goal, again from Duffy. The Dockers hosted a home semi-final at Fremantle Oval against the Gold Coast Suns, winning by a club record 70 points to qualify for a preliminary final against Melbourne. The season was cancelled shortly afterwards without a winner due to the outbreak of the COVID-19 pandemic. Kiara Bowers won Fremantle's fairest and best award and led the competition in tackles with 99. Duffy won the Fremantle goal-kicker award and led the league for goals kicked with 12, and both Bowers and Gemma Houghton were named in the 2020 All-Australian team.

=== Current squad ===
Fremantle Football Club · AFL Women's personnel
Playing list		Inactive list	Coaching staff
1 Gabby Newton (vc); 2 Kiara Bowers; 3 Emma O'Driscoll; 4 Ange Stannett (c); 5 Sarah Verrier; 6 Madi Scanlon; 7 Aisling McCarthy; 8 Charli Hazelhurst; 9 Gabby O'Sullivan; 11 Holly Egan; 12 Mia Anderson; 13 Georgie Brisbane; 14 Orlagh Lally; 15 Evie Parker; 16 Matilda Banfield*	17 Monique Bessen; 18 Lily Johnson; 19 Hayley Miller; 20 Noa McNaughton; 21 Mim Strom; 22 Bella Smith; 25 Megan Kauffman; 26 Indi Strom; 29 Indiana West; 30 Jessica Low; 32 Laura Pugh; 33 Aoife Healy*; 35 Eden Zanker; 37 Tunisha Kikoak	10 Áine Tighe	Senior coach: Lisa Webb; Assistant coaches: Darren Rumble (back line); Cam Shepherd (midfield); Max Duffy (forward line); Zac Strom (ruck); Sam Gelavis (development); Legend: (c) captain; (vc) vice-captain; * rookie; Updated: 16 November 2026; Sources: Players, coaches

=== Season summaries ===
	Home and away						Finals				Coach	Captain	Best and fairest
Year	P	W	D	L	%	Rank	P	W	L	Rank	Coach	Captain	Best and fairest
2025	12	6	0	6	80.9	11/18	-	-	-	11/18	Lisa Webb	Ange Stannett	Aisling McCarthy
2024	11	8	0	3	136.0	5/18	2	1	1	6/18	Lisa Webb	Ange Stannett	Mim Strom
2023	10	4	0	6	71.9	13/18	-	-	-	13/18	Lisa Webb	Hayley Miller	Ange Stannett
2022 (S7)	10	3	1	6	66.8	12/18	-	-	-	12/18	Trent Cooper	Hayley Miller	Kiara Bowers
2022 (S6)	10	7	0	3	134.9	5/14	2	1	1	4/14	Trent Cooper	Hayley Miller	Hayley Miller
2021	9	6	0	3	185.1	5/14	1	0	1	5/14	Trent Cooper	Kara Antonio	Kiara Bowers
2020	6	6	0	0	154.7	1/14	1	1	0	1/14†	Trent Cooper	Kara Antonio	Kiara Bowers
2019	7	6	0	1	141.2	2/10	1	0	1	3/10	Trent Cooper	Kara Donnellan	Kiara Bowers
2018	7	3	0	4	89.8	7/8	-	-	-	7/8	Michelle Cowan	Kara Donnellan	Ebony Antonio
2017	7	1	1	5	64.1	7/8	-	-	-	7/8	Michelle Cowan	Kara Donnellan	Dana Hooker
Total/Avg	89	50	2	37	-		7	3	4				
Overall	96	53	2	41	-								
P = Played, W = Win, D = Draw, L = Loss, % = Score for/Score against. † Due to the COVID-19 pandemic, the finals series was cancelled after the first week, with no premiership awarded.

Source: AFLW History

== Awards ==
The Doig Medal is the Fremantle Football Club's annual fairest and best award. Currently, the Fremantle coaching staff give every player votes on a 5, 4, 3, 2, 1 basis after every match, including Finals Series matches. Top votes are awarded for what is regarded as an elite performance. At the end of the year the votes are tallied and the Doig Medal Night is held to announce the winner. Variations on the voting system have been used in past years. The awards ceremony has been held at the Fremantle Passenger Terminal (1995), Challenge Stadium (1998–1999), Fremantle Oval (2000–2001), the Grand Ballroom at Burswood Entertainment Complex (2002–2005, 2008–current) and the Perth Convention Exhibition Centre (2006–2007).

The Beacon Award is presented to the club's best first year player. Mature aged recruits Michael Barlow, Tendai Mzungu and Lee Spurr have won in recent years, despite being significantly older than most first year players.

Season	Doig Medal winner	Beacon Award winner	Best clubman	Players' award	Players of the Finals	Leading goalkicker
1995	Peter Mann	Scott Chisholm			—N/a	Peter Mann (33)
1996	Stephen O'Reilly	Gavin Mitchell			—N/a	Kingsley Hunter (33)
1997	Dale Kickett	Mark Gale			—N/a	Kingsley Hunter (32)
1998	Jason Norrish	Brad Dodd	Chris Bond / Jason Norrish		—N/a	Clive Waterhouse (30)
1999	Adrian Fletcher	Clem Michael	Ashley Prescott		—N/a	Tony Modra (71)
2000	Troy Cook	Paul Hasleby	Dale Kickett / John Rankin		—N/a	Clive Waterhouse (53)
2001	Peter Bell	Dion Woods	Leigh Brown		—N/a	Justin Longmuir and Matthew Pavlich (28)
2002	Matthew Pavlich	Paul Medhurst	Shaun McManus		—N/a	Trent Croad (42)
2003	Peter Bell	Graham Polak	Troy Longmuir		—N/a	Paul Medhurst (50)
2004	Peter Bell	Andrew Browne	Matthew Carr		—N/a	Paul Medhurst (41)
2005	Matthew Pavlich	David Mundy	Troy Cook		—N/a	Matthew Pavlich (61)
2006	Matthew Pavlich	Marcus Drum	Luke Webster		Aaron Sandilands	Matthew Pavlich (71)
2007	Matthew Pavlich	Robert Warnock	Heath Black		—N/a	Matthew Pavlich (72)
2008	Matthew Pavlich	Rhys Palmer	Luke Webster		—N/a	Matthew Pavlich (67)
2009	Aaron Sandilands	Stephen Hill	Michael Johnson		—N/a	Matthew Pavlich (28)
2010	David Mundy	Michael Barlow	Matthew de Boer		—N/a	Matthew Pavlich (61)
2011	Matthew Pavlich	Tendai Mzungu	Matthew de Boer		—N/a	Chris Mayne / Kepler Bradley (25)
2012	Ryan Crowley	Lee Spurr	Tendai Mzungu	Chris Mayne	—N/a	Matthew Pavlich (69)
2013	Nat Fyfe	Cam Sutcliffe	Lee Spurr	Ryan Crowley	Nat Fyfe	Michael Walters (46)
2014	Nat Fyfe	Matt Taberner	Alex Silvagni	Nat Fyfe	Cam Sutcliffe & Zac Dawson	Hayden Ballantyne (49)
2015	Aaron Sandilands	Alex Pearce	Jonathon Griffin	Nat Fyfe	Michael Walters	Michael Walters (44)
2016	Lachie Neale	Lachie Weller	Aaron Sandilands	Lachie Neale	—N/a	Michael Walters (36)
2017	Bradley Hill	Luke Ryan	Zac Dawson	Nat Fyfe	—N/a	Cam McCarthy (25)
2018	Lachie Neale	Brennan Cox	Aaron Sandilands	Ed Langdon	—N/a	Michael Walters (22)
2019	Nat Fyfe	Sam Switkowski	Aaron Sandilands	Nat Fyfe	—N/a	Michael Walters (40)
2020	Luke Ryan	Caleb Serong	Alex Pearce	Ethan Hughes	—N/a	Matt Taberner (29)
2021	Sean Darcy	Hayden Young	Caleb Serong / David Mundy	Lachie Schultz	—N/a	Matt Taberner (37)
2022	Andrew Brayshaw	Brandon Walker	Sam Switkowski		Caleb Serong	Rory Lobb (36)
2023	Caleb Serong	Jye Amiss	Josh Corbett		—N/a	Jye Amiss (41)
2024	Caleb Serong	Josh Draper	Josh Corbett	Alex Pearce	—N/a	Josh Treacy (45)
2025	Caleb Serong	Murphy Reid	Patrick Voss	Alex Pearce	—N/a	Josh Treacy (44)
2026	Luke Jackson	Chris Scerri	Sam Switkowski	Alex Pearce	Caleb Serong & Luke Jackson	Jye Amiss (64)

=== AFL Women's Awards ===
Season	Fairest and best	Best first year player	Best clubwoman	Players' award	Leading goalkicker
2017	Dana Hooker	—N/a	Amy Lavell	Kara Antonio	Kara Antonio/Ashley Sharp (4)
2018	Ebony Antonio	—N/a	Lisa Webb	Ebony Antonio	Amy Lavell (6)
2019	Kiara Bowers	Philipa Seth	Evie Gooch	Kiara Bowers	Gemma Houghton (9)
2020	Kiara Bowers	Mim Strom	Kara Antonio	Kiara Bowers	Sabreena Duffy (12)
2021	Kiara Bowers	Sarah Verrier	Ange Stannett	Kiara Bowers	Gemma Houghton (15)
2022 (S6)	Hayley Miller	Jessica Low	Ange Stannett	Ange Stannett	Ebony Antonio & Hayley Miller (10)
2022 (S7)	Kiara Bowers	Orlagh Lally	Ange Stannett	Kiara Bowers	Áine Tighe (11)
2023	Ange Stannett	Jae Flynn	Ange Stannett	Ange Stannett	Áine Tighe (9)
2024	Mim Strom	Tunisha Kikoak	Ange Stannett	Mim Strom	Aisling McCarthy (8)
2025	Aisling McCarthy	Indi Strom	Philipa Seth	Áine Tighe	Hayley Miller (11)

=== Records ===
- Premierships: Nil
- Grand Final appearances: 2 (2013, 2026)
- Minor Premierships: 2 (2015, 2026)
- Wooden spoons: 1 (2001)
- Finals series reached: Ten (2003, 2006, 2010, 2012, 2013, 2014, 2015, 2022, 2025, 2026)
- Biggest winning margin: 124 points – 24.11 (155) vs. North Melbourne 4.7 (31), Hands Oval, 6 June 2026
- Biggest losing margin: 133 points – 3.7 (25) vs. Geelong 24.14 (158), GMHBA Stadium, 18 August 2018
- Longest winning streak: 14 games (Round 2, 2026 – Round 17, 2026)
- Longest losing streak: 18 games (Round 22, 2000 – Round 17, 2001)
- Highest score: 28.12 (180) vs. Collingwood 10.8 (68), Subiaco Oval, 8 May 2005
- Lowest score: 1.7 (13) vs. Adelaide 19.16 (130), AAMI Stadium, 11 July 2009

=== Individual awards and records ===
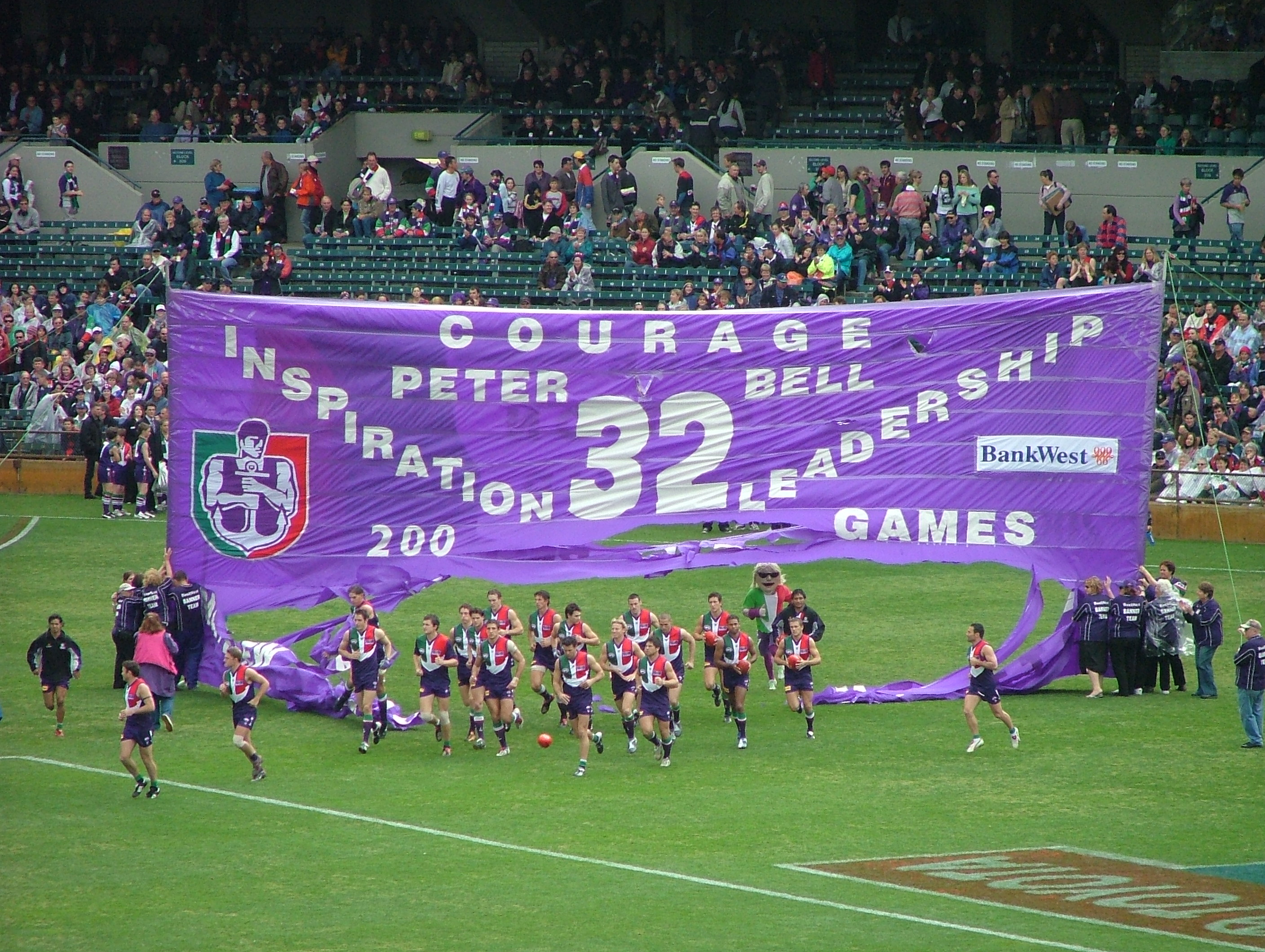
A banner at Subiaco Oval celebrating the 200th game of Hall of Fame inductee Peter Bell

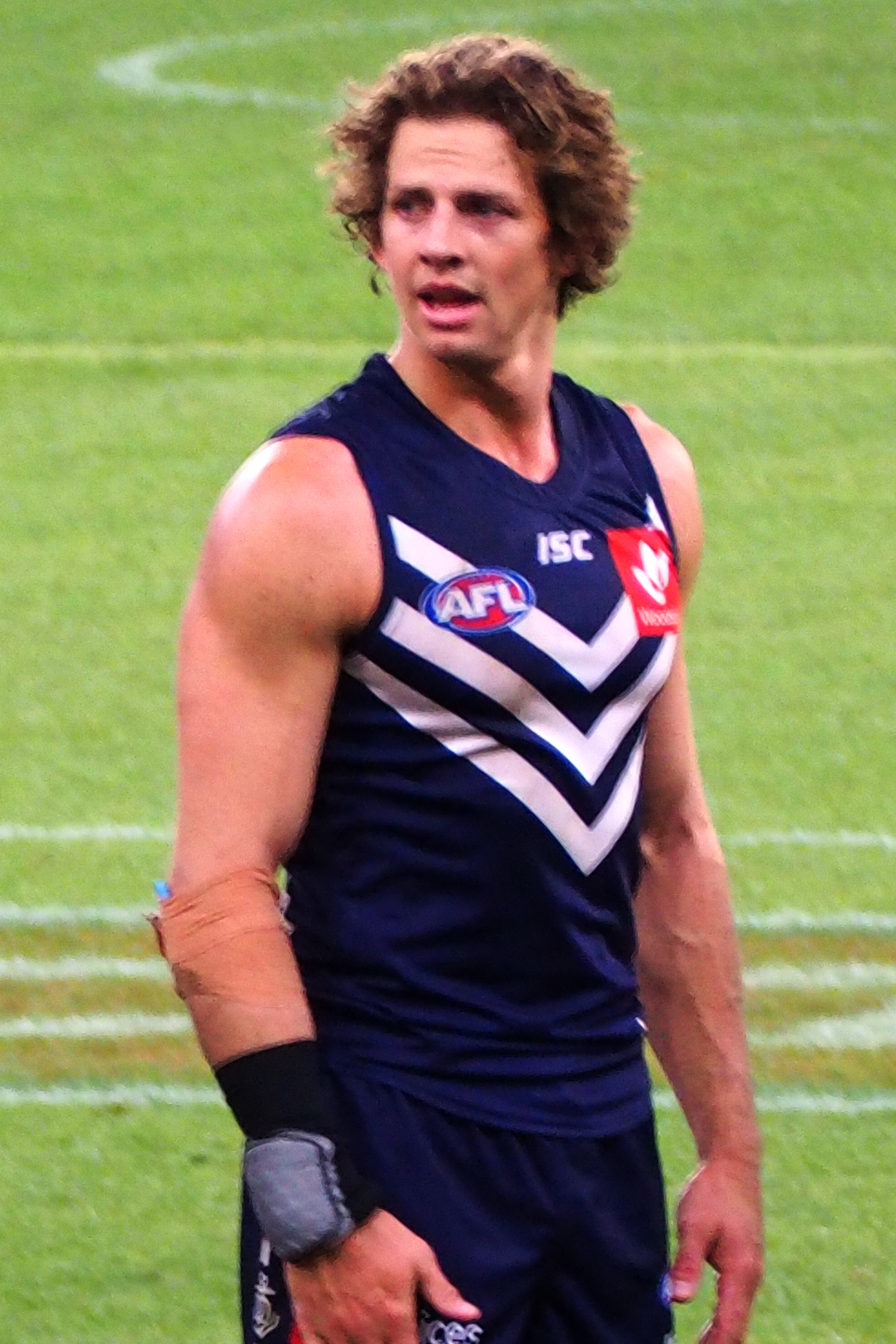
Two-time Brownlow Medallist Nat Fyfe

- Australian Football Hall of Fame inductees: Peter Bell 2015, Matthew Pavlich 2022
- Brownlow Medallists: Nat Fyfe 2015, 2019
- AFL Women's best and fairest winner: Kiara Bowers 2021
- Norm Smith Medallists: Shai Bolton: 2026
- Coleman Medallists: None
- AFL Rising Star award: Paul Hasleby 2000; Rhys Palmer 2008; Caleb Serong 2020; Murphy Reid 2025
- All Australians: Matthew Pavlich 2002, 2003, 2005, 2006, 2007, 2008; Peter Bell 2003; Paul Hasleby 2003; Aaron Sandilands 2008, 2009, 2010, 2014; Luke McPharlin 2012; Michael Johnson 2013; Nat Fyfe 2014, 2015, 2019 (c); Hayden Ballantyne 2014; David Mundy 2015; Michael Walters 2019; Luke Ryan 2020, 2024; Andrew Brayshaw 2022; Caleb Serong 2023, 2024, 2025; Jordan Clark 2025, 2026; Shai Bolton: 2026; Luke Jackson: 2026; Josh Treacy: 2026; Murphy Reid: 2026
- AFLW All-Australians: Kara Antonio 2017; Dana Hooker 2018, 2019; Ebony Antonio 2018; Gemma Houghton 2019, 2020; Kiara Bowers 2019, 2020, 2021; Janelle Cuthbertson 2021; Hayley Miller 2022 (S6) (vc); Emma O'Driscoll 2023, 2024; Aisling McCarthy 2024; Mim Strom 2024, 2025; Gabby Newton 2025
- 22under22: Nat Fyfe 2013; Michael Walters 2013; Lachie Neale 2015; Sean Darcy 2018, 2020; Ed Langdon 2018; Adam Cerra 2020, 2021; Andrew Brayshaw 2020, 2021 (vc), 2022 (c); Hayden Young 2022, 2023; Jordan Clark 2022; Caleb Serong 2022, 2023; Luke Jackson 2023, 2024; Jye Amiss 2023, 2024; Josh Treacy 2024; Josh Draper 2024; Murphy Reid 2025, 2026
- 22under22 (AFLW): Roxanne Roux 2020; Sabreena Duffy 2020, 2021; Emma O'Driscoll 2021, 2022 (S6), 2022 (S7), Georgie Brisbane 2025
- International rules representatives: Clive Waterhouse 1999; Matthew Pavlich 2002, 2003; Matthew Carr 2003; Paul Hasleby 2003; Robbie Haddrill 2004; Heath Black 2005; Ryan Crowley 2006; David Mundy 2006, 2015; Brett Peake 2006; Roger Hayden 2008; Garrick Ibbotson 2010; Paul Duffield 2010; Hayden Ballantyne 2015; Nat Fyfe 2017
- Leigh Matthews Trophy (AFLPA Most Valuable Player) winners: Nat Fyfe 2014, 2015; Andrew Brayshaw 2022
- AFLPA Best First Year Player Award winners: Paul Hasleby 2000; Rhys Palmer 2008; Michael Barlow 2010; Caleb Serong 2020; Murphy Reid 2025
- AFLCA Best Young Player Award/Best Emerging Player winners: Stephen Hill 2010; Nat Fyfe 2011; Caleb Serong 2021; Murphy Reid: 2026
- AFLCA Coach of the Year: Justin Longmuir 2026
- Jim Stynes Community Leadership Award: AFL: Bailey Banfield (2026) AFLW: Madi Scanlon (2024)
- 300-game players ("the 300 club"): David Mundy, 376 games; Matthew Pavlich, 353 games
- Most consecutive games: Matthew Pavlich, 160 games (Rd 15 2001 – Rd 16 2008)
- Most goals: Matthew Pavlich, 700 goals (as of 2020 season)
- Most goals in a season: 72 Matthew Pavlich, 2007
- Most goals in a game: 10 Tony Modra vs Melbourne, Rd 10 1999, MCG
- Mark of the Year winners: Tony Modra 2000; Luke McPharlin 2005
- Goal of the Year winners: Winston Abraham 1996; Hayden Ballantyne 2011; Caleb Serong 2021
- Goal of the Year (AFLW) winners: Ashley Sharp 2019

=== Attendance records ===
- Record attendance (home and away game): 62,198, Round 19, 20 July 2025 at MCG v Collingwood
- Record attendance (AFLW home and away game): 41,975, Round 2, 10 February 2018 at Perth Stadium v Collingwood
- Record attendance (home game): 58,982, First Elimination Final, 03 September 2022 at Perth Stadium v Western Bulldogs
- Record attendance (finals match): 100,023, Grand Final, Sept 26, 2026 at MCG v Brisbane Lions.

=== Fremantle Football Hall of Legends ===
The Fremantle Football Hall of Legends was inaugurated by Fremantle Football Club in 1995, in recognition of the new AFL team's links with its home city's football heritage. The inductees are nominated by the two clubs from the Fremantle area in the WAFL: East Fremantle and South Fremantle. In time, players who represented Fremantle in the AFL will join their predecessors in this prestigious Hall.

=== Fremantle's 25 Since '95 ===
In 2019, The West Australian named Fremantle's greatest team of the past twenty five years as part of the club's twenty fifth anniversary celebrations, as voted by Fans and club officials.:

Backs:	Roger Hayden	Shane Parker	Antoni Grover
Half Backs:	Michael Johnson	Luke McPharlin	Dale Kickett
Centres:	Stephen Hill	David Mundy	Shaun McManus
Half Forwards:	Michael Walters	Matthew Pavlich	Clive Waterhouse
Forwards:	Jeff Farmer	Tony Modra	Hayden Ballantyne
Ruck:	Aaron Sandilands	Nat Fyfe	Peter Bell
Interchange:	Paul Hasleby	Lachie Neale	Troy Cook
	Michael Barlow	Ryan Crowley	Justin Longmuir
	Ben Allan		

== Supporters ==
=== Number-one ticket holders ===
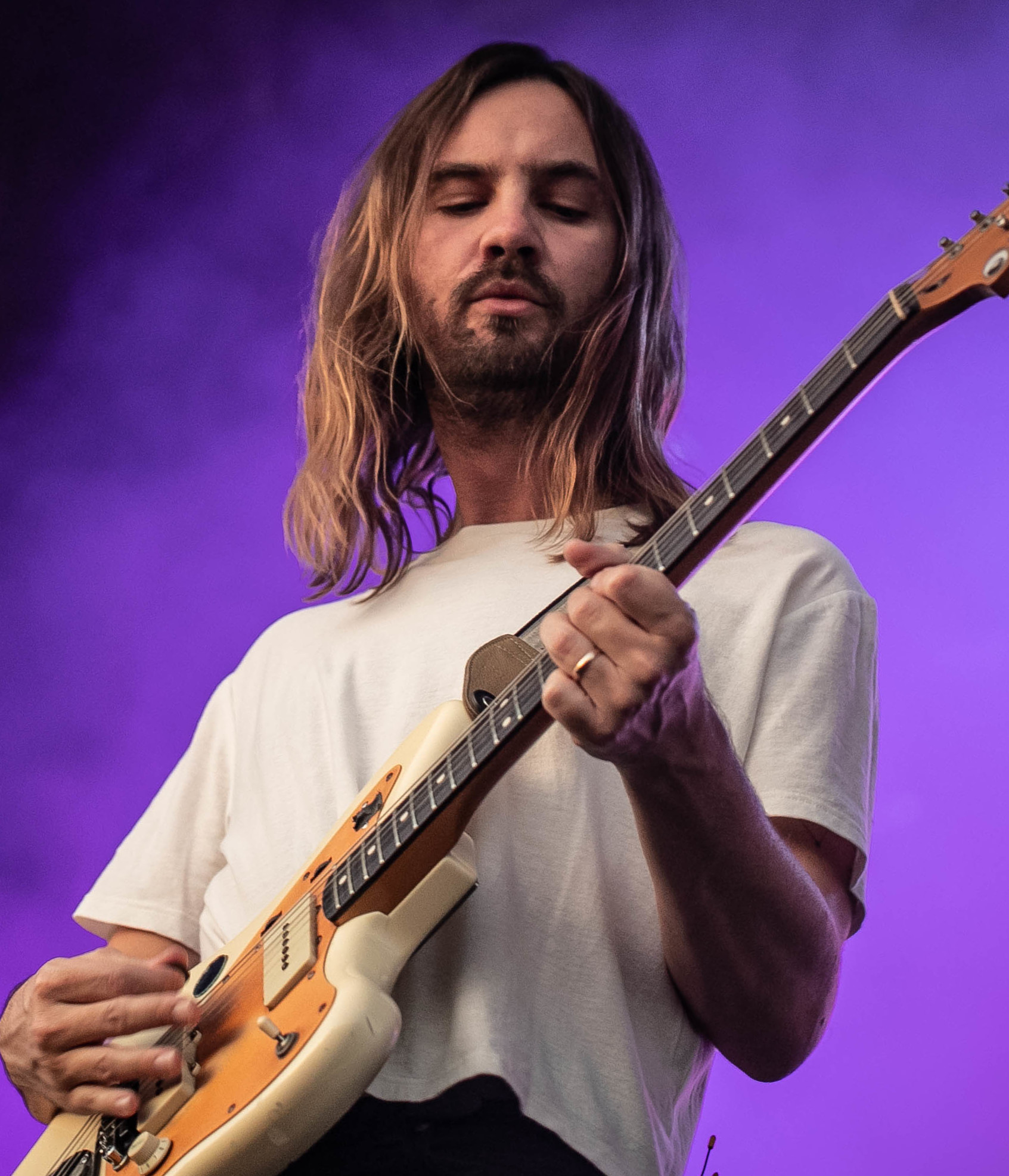
Kevin Parker of Tame Impala, the club's current number-one ticket holder

It is traditional for each AFL club to recognise a prominent supporter as the number-one ticket holder. Fremantle originally awarded this to Carmen Lawrence, the sitting member for the federal seat of Fremantle. This was roundly criticised as the member may or may not be a supporter of the club and unnecessarily linked politics with sport. The policy was soon changed to select a well-known Fremantle identity for a two-year period. The current number-one ticket holder is Kevin Parker, the frontman of Tame Impala

Year	Number-one ticket holder
1995–1996	Carmen Lawrence, WA premier
1997–2002	Jack Sheedy, footballer; Steve Marsh, footballer
2003–2005	Rove McManus, comedian
2006–2007	Luc Longley, basketball player
2008	Jesse Dart, number-one junior ticket holder
2009	Nick O'Hern, golfer
2010–2011	Eskimo Joe, indie rock band
2012–2015	Ben Roberts-Smith, soldier
2016–2021	Richard Walley, Indigenous rights activist
2021–	Kevin Parker, musician

=== Other notable supporters ===
Other high-profile fans include the current and former WA premiers Roger Cook, Mark McGowan and Alan Carpenter; former federal Defence Minister Stephen Smith; comedian and musician Tim Minchin; members of the psychedelic rock bands Tame Impala and Pond; hip hop group Koi Child; author Tim Winton; American tennis player John Isner; journalists and television presenters Dixie Marshall, Neroli Meadows and Simon Reeve; professional golfer Min Woo Lee; and the late political journalist Matt Price, who wrote the 2003 book Way to Go: Sadness, Euphoria and the Fremantle Dockers.

=== Membership base ===
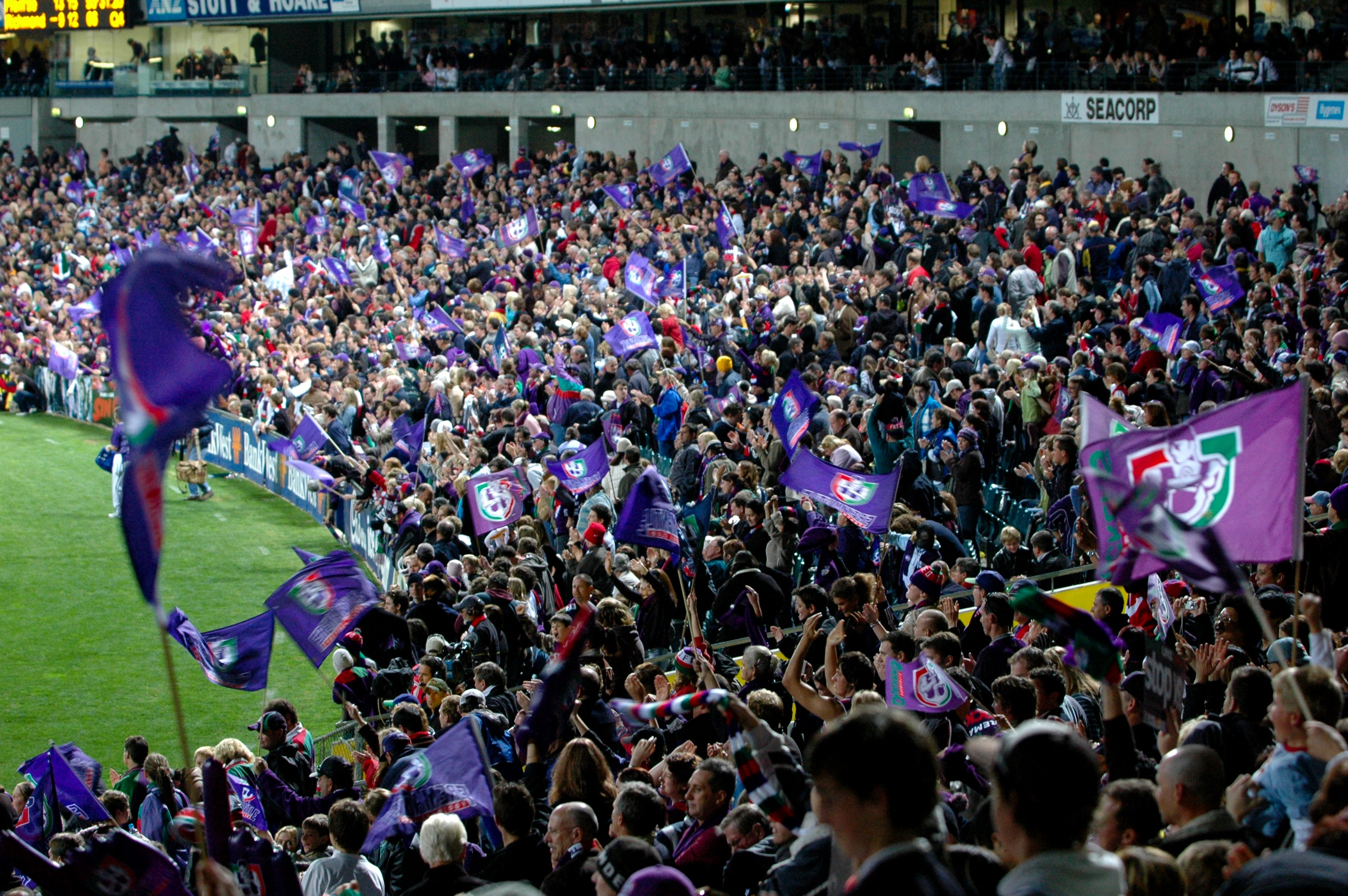
Supporters cheer on the Dockers

Despite a relative lack of on-field success, Fremantle has recorded membership figures above average for the league. The club in 2004 had the fastest-growing membership in the AFL competition, at more than 27% from the previous year, with home crowds growing at a similar rate. The club's recent membership slogans have emphasised the passion of Fremantle fans for their team.

Fremantle achieved a membership of over 60,000 in 2023, for the first time in the club's history.

Season	Members	Change from previous season	Finishing position (after finals)	Average home match crowds
1995	18,456	–	13th	23,361
1996	19,622	▲1,166 (+6.32%)	13th	22,473
1997	19,949	▲327 (+1.67%)	12th	21,982
1998	22,186	▲2,237 (+11.21%)	15th	23,365
1999	24,896	▲2,710 (+12.21%)	15th	23,972
2000	24,925	▲29 (+0.12%)	12th	22,357
2001	23,898	▼1,027 (−4.12%)	16th	21,258
2002	23,775	▼123 (−0.51%)	13th	26,359
2003	25,347	▲1,572 (+6.61%)	7th	31,688
2004	32,259	▲6,912 (+27.27%)	9th	35,693
2005	34,124	▲1,865 (+5.78%)	10th	35,224
2006	35,666	▲1,542 (+4.52%)	4th	37,063
2007	43,343	▲7,677 (+21.52%)	11th	37,474
2008	43,366	▲23 (+0.05%)	14th	35,877
2009	39,206	▼4,160 (−9.6%)	14th	33,144
2010	39,854	▲648 (+1.63%)	6th	37,084
2011	42,762	▲2,908 (+6.8%)	11th	34,394
2012	41,705	▼1,057 (−2.4%)	6th	33,386
2013	44,480	▲2,775 (+6.7%)	2nd	35,015
2014	48,776	▲4,296 (+9.7%)	6th	36,215
2015	51,433	▲2,657 (+5.4%)	3rd	36,914
2016	51,889	▲456 (+0.89%)	16th	31,416
2017	51,254	▼635 (−1.22%)	14th	32,375
2018	55,639	▲4,385 (+8.60%)	14th	41,764
2019	51,431	▼4,208 (−7.56%)	13th	40,896
2020	51,577	▲146 (+0.28%)	12th	16,215
2021	50,342	▼1,235 (−2.4%)	11th	30,008
2022	56,105	▲5,763 (11.4%)	6th	40,460
2023	62,064	▲5,959 (10.62%)	14th	41,199
2024	62,237	▲173 (0.28%)	10th	46,580
2025	66,179	▲3,942 (6.33%)	6th	45,758

=== Patrons ===
From 2003 until 2021, the Fremantle Football Club had the current or past Governor of Western Australia as its patron.

- 2003–2005: John Sanderson
- 2006–2021: Ken Michael
- 2021–: Richard Walley

Vice-patrons

- David Malcolm – Chief Justice of the Supreme Court of Western Australia (retired)
- Syd Corser
- Con Regan and Beryl Regan
- Steve Marsh
- Jack Sheedy

== Honours ==
Premierships
Competition	Level	Wins	Years won
Australian Football League	Seniors	0	Nil
AFL Women's	Seniors	0	Nil
Other titles and honours
McClelland Trophy	Multiple	1	2015
Finishing positions
Australian Football League	Minor premiership	2	2015, 2026
Australian Football League	Grand Finalist	2	2013, 2026
Australian Football League	Wooden spoons	1	2001
AFL Women's	Minor premiership	0	Nil
AFL Women's	Grand Finalist	0	Nil
AFL Women's	Wooden spoons	0	Nil

== See also ==
- List of Fremantle players (alphabetical)
- List of Fremantle Dockers league players (ordered by debut)
- Australian rules football in Western Australia
- Fremantle Football Club drafting and trading history
- Sport in Australia
- Sport in Western Australia
