= WA Football =

Governing body for Australian rules football in Western Australia

- Sport: Australian rules football
- Jurisdiction: Western Australia
- Founded: 1989; 36 years ago
- Headquarters: Tuart Hill, Western Australia
- Chairman: Ian Callahan
- CEO: Michael Roberts

Official website
- wafootball.com.au
- (Western Australia)

WA Football, formerly the West Australian Football Commission, is the governing body of Australian rules football in Western Australia. The organisation is registered as a not-for-profit association.

WA Football assists in administering the West Australian Football League (WAFL) and is the owner of Australian Football League (AFL) teams Fremantle Dockers and West Coast Eagles.

== History ==
In the late 1980s, Australian rules football in Western Australia faced financial struggles and depended heavily on State Government funding. Graham Edwards, the State Sports Minister, called for changes to the sport's administrative structure, resulting in the creation of the West Australian Football Commission (WAFC) in 1989. Peter Tannock, a future Hall of Famer, served as the chair of the WAFC for its first decade.

When the WAFC was formed, the Eagles were insolvent and unsuccessful, the WAFL was in serious trouble and Subiaco Oval needed an overhaul desperately. By 1991, the Eagles and WAFL were rescued from financial ruin and planning began for a second WA AFL team. Both the Eagles and Dockers had $4 million upfront licence fees upon joining the AFL, which attributed to the financial troubles of the WAFC.

In 2020, a parliamentary committee inquiry into the WAFC was established after it was revealed that a third of its revenue went to commission staff payments. Sports Minister Mick Murray had concerns that not enough money was being spent on grassroots football by the WAFC. The WAFC sought to make drastic spending cuts following the revelations but the organisation defended its staff structure and salaries. As of 2020, the State Government provided $11 million a year to the WAFC as part of the proceeds from Optus Stadium. The inquiry found that the Eagles and Dockers had "too much power" in deciding the make-up of the WAFC board and the election of commissioners had to be reformed to be more representative of community football.

In February 2025, the West Australian Football Commission underwent a re-brand to WA Football to shed its corporate stigma.

== Districts ==
WA Football has three Regional Development Councils in the Perth metropolitan area, with each council consisting of three districts.

Councils	Districts	Location
Metro North	Claremont	Claremont
Metro North	Subiaco	Leederville
Metro North	West Perth	Joondalup
Metro Central	East Perth	Leederville
Metro Central	Perth	Lathlain
Metro Central	Swan Districts	Bassendean
Metro South	East Fremantle	East Fremantle
Metro South	Peel	Mandurah
Metro South	South Fremantle	Fremantle

== See also ==
- Australian rules football in Western Australia
- Australian rules football
- West Australian Football League
