= Michelle Cowan =

Australian rules football coach

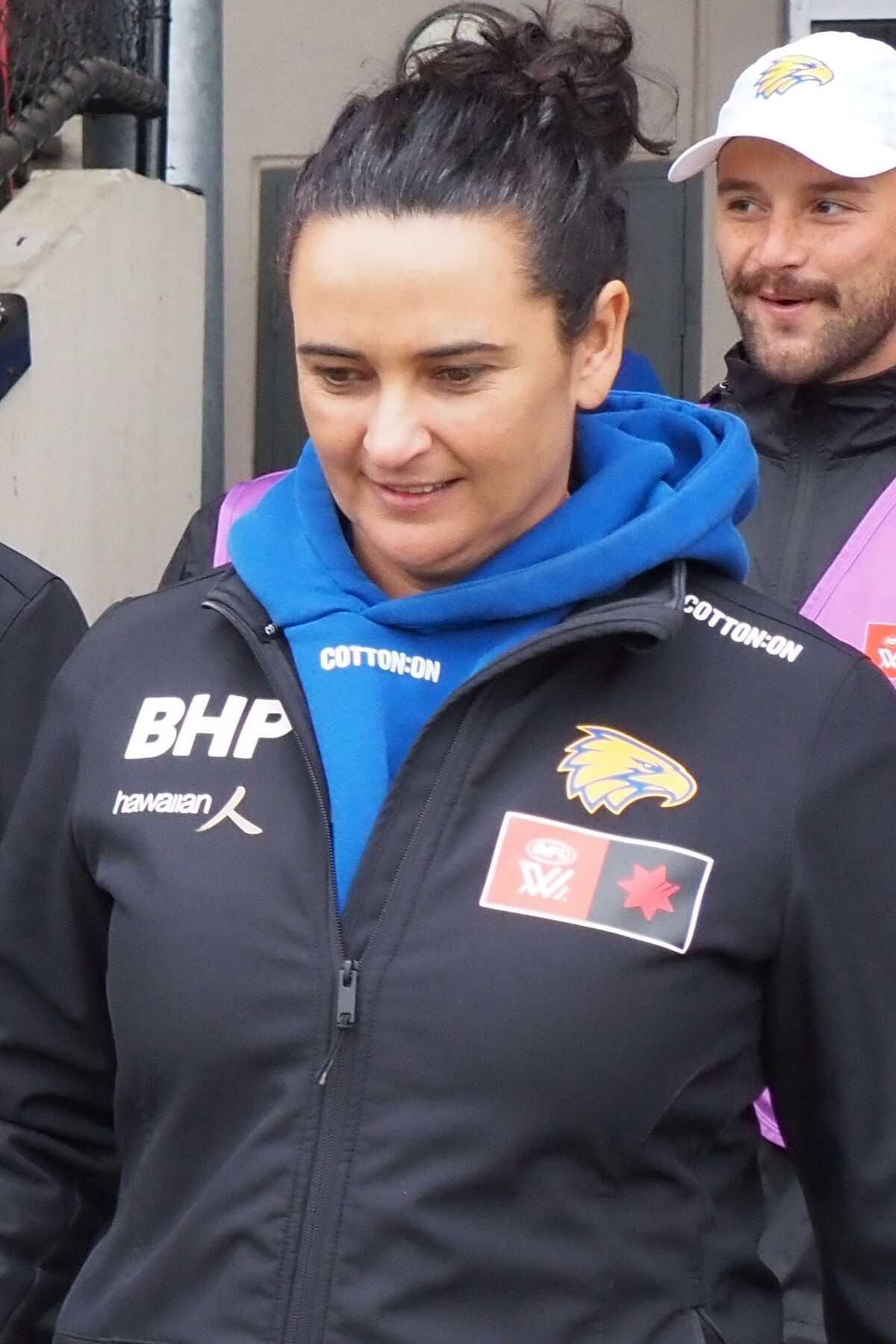
- Cowan pre-match with West Coast in 2025

Personal information
- Born: 1982 (age 43–44); Durban, South Africa

Coaching career
Years	Club	Games (W–L–D)
2017–2018	Fremantle	14 (4–9–1)

Michelle Cowan (born 1982) is an Australian rules football coach who was the inaugural head coach of the Fremantle Football Club in the AFL Women's competition (AFLW).

== Early life ==
Cowan lived in Durban, South Africa, before moving to Kambalda, Western Australia at the age of four.

== Coaching career ==
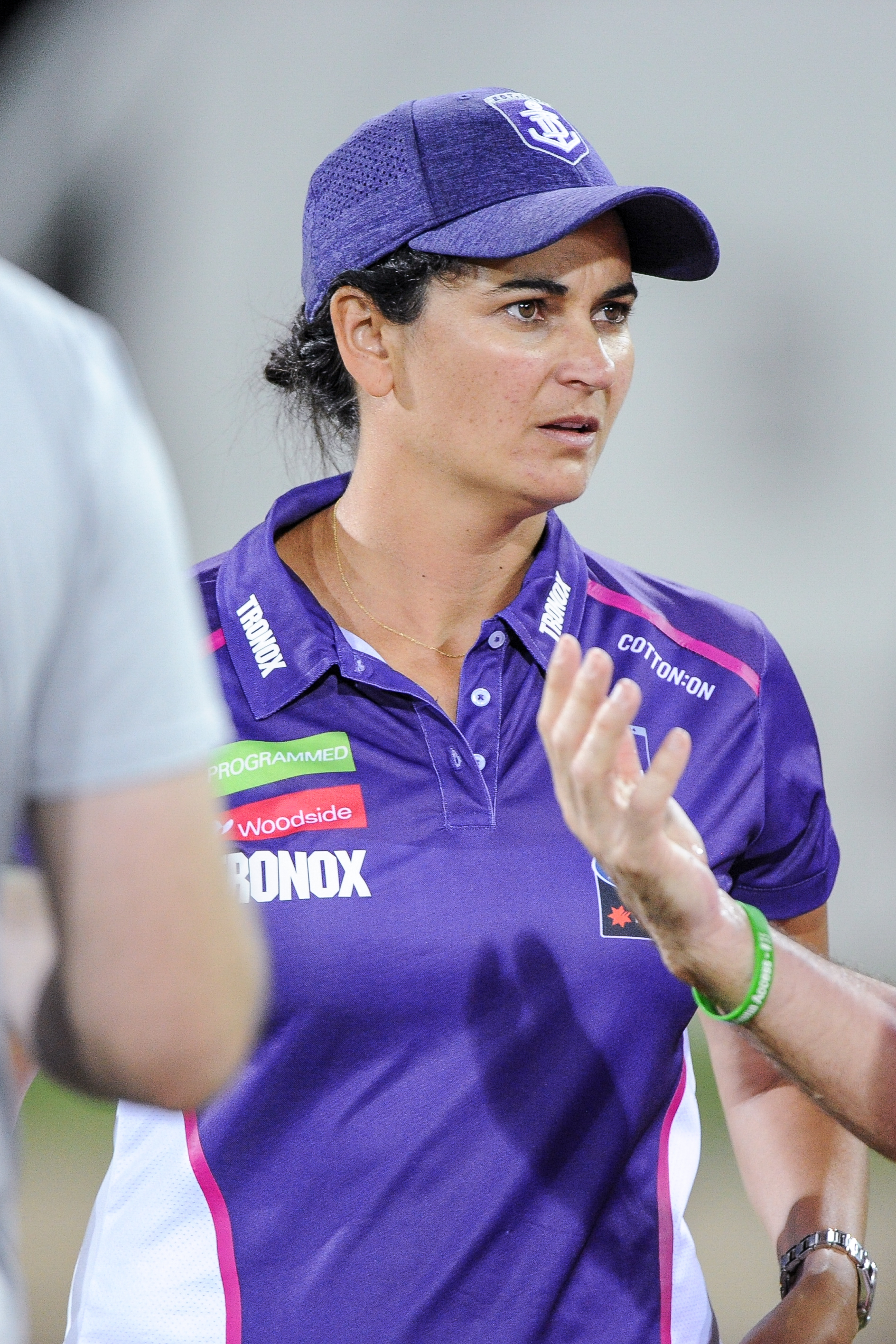
Cowan during a pre-season practice match with Fremantle in 2018

After completing high school, Cowan contacted all sixteen AFL clubs to seek a coaching position. After no interest from fifteen of the clubs, Geelong agreed to meet with her and appointed her as a Western Australian–based talent scout at just seventeen years of age. At 21 years of age, Cowan became the first female assistant coach in the West Australian Football League (WAFL) when she became the midfield coach with the West Perth Football Club. She spent eight years with West Perth before moving to the South Fremantle Football Club, also as the midfield coach.

In 2013, she was appointed the senior coach of the Melbourne Football Club's women's team during the women's exhibition series and in the same year she was named as the Football Woman of the Year. She coached Melbourne for all three years of the exhibition series, winning five out of the six matches. In February 2016, she became the first female assistant coach in Melbourne's history and the second in AFL history when she became the player development and welfare coach. Due to family reasons she left the club in July and became the inaugural coach of the Fremantle AFL Women's team.

After entering the inaugural AFL Women's season as favourites to win the premiership, Fremantle failed to live up to the pre-season expectation with the AFL head of female football and junior development, Josh Vanderloo, stating the reason was most likely due to injuries to key players and losing elite Western Australian talent to other states as marquee signings. Cowan finished the season with one win, five losses and a draw.

Fremantle finished the 2018 season with three wins, finishing seventh. Cowan was in discussions to extend her contract for the 2019 season, but instead chose to resign as head coach.

Cowan was approached by West Coast Eagles after leaving Fremantle, who offered her a contract for the 2020 AFLW season. She is also currently the AFL’s High Performance Coach / Mentor for the Female Coach Academy.

== Coaching statistics ==
Statistics are correct to the end of the 2018 season

Legend
W	Wins	L	Losses	D	Draws	W%	Winning percentage	LP	Ladder position	LT	League teams

Melbourne Exhibition Games 5 Wins 1 Loss

Season	Team	Games	W	L	D	W %	LP	LT
2017	Fremantle	7	1	5	1	14.3%	7	8
2018	Fremantle	7	3	4	0	42.9%	7	8
Career totals		14	4	9	1	28.6%		
