= Greater Western Sydney Giants draft history =

Australian rules football club

The Greater Western Sydney Giants, also known as the GWS Giants, are an Australian rules football club based in the Greater Western Sydney region of New South Wales. The club joined the Australian Football League (AFL) as an expansion club, playing their first match during the first round of the 2012 AFL season.

In the AFL draft, clubs receive picks based on the position in which they finish on the ladder during the season. The draft is held each year at the end of November, to allow the draftees to finish their school examinations before being drafted.

== 2011 Draft concessions ==
The Greater Western Sydney Giants were to join the AFL in 2012, and were provided with several draft concessions, including additional draft selections, early access to recruit 17-year-old players, and access to uncontracted and previously listed players in this offseason. These concessions were similar to those provided to the Gold Coast Football Club, which entered the league in the previous season.

Greater Western Sydney was permitted to recruit the following players directly, without the need for any draft:

- At the end of 2010, up to twelve 17-year-old players (born between 1 January – 30 April 1993), who were too young to enter the 2010 AFL draft. These players were not eligible to play senior AFL football in 2011, and would continue to undergo junior development, either in Sydney or their home state.
- Up to ten players who were not on an AFL list but had previously nominated for a national draft. These players could be recruited at the end of either 2011 or 2012, with no more than ten players recruited in this manner over the two years. Greater Western Sydney could immediately trade any players recruited in this manner.
- Up to sixteen players who were on an AFL list, but were out of contract at the end of the season. Again, these players could be recruited at the end of either 2011 or 2012, with no more than sixteen players recruited in this manner over the two years, and no more than one player recruited from any other club. Clubs who lost players in this manner received compensatory selections in the national draft; the number and value of these selections was determined based on age, contract size, on-field performance and draft order, and were permitted to be used in any year between 2011 and 2015.
- Up to sixteen players recruited from the New South Wales and Australian Capital Territory zone, recruited at any time between 2010 and 2013, and from the Northern Territory zone, recruited between 2011 and 2013.

Then, in the drafts, Greater Western Sydney had the following selections:

- In the 2011 national draft, the first selection in each round, and picks No. 2, 3, 5, 7, 9, 11, 13 and 15 in the first round.
- In the 2011 rookie draft, the first eight selections.
- In the 2012 rookie draft, the first selection in each round.

Additionally, at the end of 2011, Greater Western Sydney had the ability to trade the only four selections in a once-off "mini-draft", which could be used to recruit 17-year-old players (born between 1 January – 30 April 1994). Greater Western Sydney could only use these draft picks as trade currency; the club was not permitted to use the picks for its own list development. Players recruited and traded in this manner were not eligible to play senior AFL football in 2012, and would continue to undergo junior development. This specific concession was unique to Greater Western Sydney; Gold Coast did not have the same concession the previous year.

Greater Western Sydney began with an expanded list size of up to fifty senior players and nine rookies, to be gradually reduced to a standard list size of thirty-eight senior players and nine rookies by 2019.

During the 2011 AFL season there was speculation about several players who would be uncontracted at the end of the season, including Tom Scully, Rhys Palmer, Callan Ward and Taylor Walker. In August 2011, Phil Davis from Adelaide was the first player to announce a move to Greater Western Sydney as an uncontracted player signing. After the season had ended, Palmer, Scully and Ward also announced moves to the Giants. As compensation, Scully was rated as a top-level player, resulting in Melbourne receiving both a first-round and a mid-first round draft pick as compensation. Davis and Ward were rated as second-level, earning Adelaide and Western Bulldogs a first round compensation selection, and Palmer was rated a third-level player, giving Fremantle an end of first round selection.

== National draft selections ==
^	Denotes player who has been inducted to the Australian Football Hall of Fame
*	Denotes player who has been a premiership player and been selected for at least one All-Australian team
^{+}	Denotes player who has been a premiership player at least once
^{x}	Denotes player who has been selected for at least one All-Australian team
^{#}	Denotes player who has never played in a VFL/AFL home and away season or finals game
^{~}	Denotes player who has been selected as Rising Star

Giants AFL national draft selections
Year	Round	Pick	Player	Recruited from	League	Draft Pick Notes
2011	1	1	Jonathon Patton	Eastern Ranges	TAC Cup	-
2011	1	2	Stephen Coniglio	Swan Districts	WAFL	-
2011	1	3	Dom Tyson	Oakleigh Chargers	TAC Cup	-
2011	1	4	Will Hoskin-Elliott	Western Jets	TAC Cup	-
2011	1	5	Matt Buntine	Dandenong Stingrays	TAC Cup	-
2011	1	7	Nick Haynes	Dandenong Stingrays	TAC Cup	-
2011	1	9	Adam Tomlinson	Oakleigh Chargers	TAC Cup	-
2011	1	10	Liam Sumner	Sandringham Dragons	TAC Cup	-
2011	1	11	Toby Greene	Oakleigh Chargers	TAC Cup	-
2011	1	13	Taylor Adams	Geelong Falcons	TAC Cup	-
2011	1	14	Devon Smith	Geelong Falcons	TAC Cup	-
2011	3	56	Tom Downie	North Ballarat Rebels	TAC Cup	-
2011	5	79	Setanta Ó hAilpín	Carlton	AFL	-
2011	6	87	James McDonald	Old Xaverians	VAFA	-
2012	1	1	Lachie Whitfield	Dandenong Stingrays	TAC Cup	-
2012	1	2	Jonathan O'Rourke	Calder Cannons	TAC Cup	Traded from Gold Coast
2012	1	3	Lachie Plowman	Calder Cannons	TAC Cup	Traded from Melbourne
2012	1	12	Kristian Jaksch	Oakleigh Chargers	TAC Cup	Traded from St Kilda
2012	1	14	Aidan Corr	Northern Knights	TAC Cup	Traded from Melbourne, Greater Western Sydney uncontracted player compensation pick (Scully)
2012	2	27	James Stewart	Sandringham Dragons	TAC Cup	Traded by Hawthorn, received from Western Bulldogs
2013	1	1	Tom Boyd	Eastern Ranges	TAC Cup	-
2013	1	2	Josh Kelly	Sandringham Dragons	TAC Cup	Traded from Melbourne
2013	1	14	Cam McCarthy	South Fremantle	WAFL	Traded from Port Adelaide
2013	2	29	Rory Lobb	Swan Districts	WAFL	Traded from Brisbane Lions
2013	9	97	Jake Barrett	Temora	Farrer FL	NSW zone selection
2014	1	4	Jarrod Pickett	South Fremantle	WAFL	-
2014	1	6	Caleb Marchbank	Murray Bushrangers	TAC Cup	Traded from Western Bulldogs
2014	1	7	Paul Ahern	Calder Cannons	TAC Cup	Traded from Carlton
2014	2	23	Pat McKenna	Gisborne	Bendigo Football League	Traded from Melbourne
2014	2	24	Jack Steele	Belconnen	NEAFL	Academy player
2014	7	85	Jeremy Finlayson	Sydney Hills Eagles	NEAFL	Academy player
2015	1	7	Jacob Hopper	North Ballarat Rebels	TAC Cup	Academy player; Gold Coast's bid matched with pick 11
2015	1	13	Matthew Kennedy	Collingullie-Glenfield Park	RFNL	Academy player; Richmond's bid matched with picks 34 and 40
2015	1	16	Harrison Himmelberg	Mangoplah-CUE	RFNL	Academy player; Adelaide's bid matched with picks 48, 50, 55 and 59
2015	3	41	Matt Flynn	Narrandera	RFNL	Academy player; Melbourne's bid matched with GWS' next pick
2016	1	2	Tim Taranto	Sandringham Dragons	TAC Cup	Traded from Brisbane Lions
2016	1	5	Will Setterfield	Sandringham Dragons	TAC Cup	Academy player, Carlton's bid matched with picks 15 and 37.
2016	1	14	Harry Perryman	Collingullie-Glenfield Park	RFNL	Academy player, Adelaide's bid matched with picks 38, 44 and 51.
2016	1	20	Isaac Cumming	North Broken Hill	BHFL	Academy player, Sydney's bid matched with picks 52, 54, 55 and 56.
2016	4	54	Lachlan Tiziani	Murray Bushrangers	TAC Cup	Academy player, traded from Melbourne; received from Essendon
2016	4	58	Matt de Boer	Fremantle	AFL	-
2017	1	11	Aiden Bonar	Dandenong Stingrays	TAC Cup	Traded from Essendon
2017	2	27	Brent Daniels	Bendigo Pioneers	TAC Cup	Traded from St Kilda
2017	2	28	Sam Taylor	Swan Districts	WAFL	Traded from Carlton; received from Western Bulldogs
2017	4	56	Zac Langdon	Claremont	WAFL	Traded by Fremantle; received from Gold Coast
2017	4	64	Nick Shipley	St George	Sydney AFL	Originally pick No.15, but slid down due to 1,000 point penalty following the Lachie Whitfield saga; Academy Selection
2018	1	11	Jye Caldwell	Bendigo Pioneers	TAC Cup	Traded from Essendon
2018	1	14	Jackson Hately	Central District	SANFL	Traded from Freo; received from Port, N.M.
2018	1	22	Xavier O'Halloran	Western Jets	TAC Cup	Traded from Freo; received from Bris, Suns, WCE
2018	2	24	Bobby Hill	Perth	WAFL	Traded from Adelaide at the draft; received from Carlton
2018	2	34	Kieren Briggs	Pennant Hills	AFL Syd.	Academy selection
2018	4	61	Connor Idun	Geelong Falcons	TAC Cup	Traded from St Kilda at the draft; received from Port Adelaide
2019	1	4	Lachlan Ash	Murray Bushrangers	NAB League	Traded from Adelaide; received from Carlton in 2018
2019	1	10	Tom Green	Canberra Demons	NEAFL	Academy selection, matched bid by Carlton
2019	3	51	Jake Riccardi	Werribee	VFL	Traded from Collingwood at the draft; received from Brisbane Lions; received from Sydney; received from Carlton (via Adelaide) in 2018
2019	5	65	Thomas Hutchesson	Adelaide	SANFL	-
2020	1	12	Tanner Bruhn	Geelong Falcons	NAB League	Free Agency compensation pick (Williams)
2020	1	15	Conor Stone	Oakleigh Chargers	NAB League	Traded from Geelong; received from Gold Coast at the 2019 National Draft
2020	1	18	Ryan Angwin	Gippsland Power	NAB League	Traded from Geelong; received from West Coast in 2019
2020	4	58	Cameron Fleeton	Geelong Falcons	NAB League	-
2020	4	59	Jacob Wehr	Woodville-West Torrens	SANFL	-
2021	1	3	Finn Callaghan	Sandringham Dragons	NAB League	←Collingwood (2020)
2021	1	15	Leek Aleer	Central District	SANFL	-
2021	3	42	Josh Fahey	Queanbeyan Tigers	AFL Canberra	Academy selection, matched bid by Western Bulldogs, used picks 47 and 89
2022	1	1	Aaron Cadman	Greater Western Victoria Rebels	NAB League	←North Melbourne
2022	1	16	Harry Rowston	Calder Cannons	NAB League	Academy selection, matched bid by Sydney
2022	1	21	Darcy Jones	Swan Districts	WAFL	←Geelong
2022	2	22	Max Gruzewski	Oakleigh Chargers	NAB League	←Richmond←North Melbourne (2021)
2022	2	34	Toby McMullin	Sandringham Dragons	NAB League	←Richmond
2023	1	12	Phoenix Gothard	Murray Bushrangers	Talent League	←Adelaide
2023	1	17	James Leake	Tasmania Devils	Talent League	←Richmond
2023	2	44	Joe Fonti	Claremont Football Club	WAFL	Free Agency Compensation pick (Flynn)
2023	4	59	Harvey Thomas	Oakleigh Chargers	Talent League	←Richmond
2024	1	18	Oliver Hannaford	Greater Western Victoria Rebels	Talent League	
2024	1	19	Harrison Oliver	Sandringham Dragons	Talent League	Free agency compensation pick (Perryman)
2024	2	36	Jack Ough	Greater Western Victoria Rebels	Talent League	←Brisbane Lions (draft)←Carlton
2024	5	71	Logan Smith	Queanbeyan	AFL Canberra	Academy selection
2025	1	15	Oskar Taylor	Eastern Ranges	Talent League	←Hawthorn (draft)←Carlton Free agency compensation pick (de Koning)
2025	3	51	Finnegan Davis	Western Jets	Talent League	←Collingwood (draft)
2025	5	59	Jake Stringer	Greater Western Sydney	AFL	Redrafted player

== Rookie draft selections ==
^	Denotes player who has been inducted to the Australian Football Hall of Fame
*	Denotes player who has been a premiership player and been selected for at least one All-Australian team
^{+}	Denotes player who has been a premiership player at least once
^{x}	Denotes player who has been selected for at least one All-Australian team
^{#}	Denotes player who has never played in a VFL/AFL home and away season or finals game
^{~}	Denotes player who has been selected as Rising Star

Giants AFL rookie draft selections
Year	Round	Pick	Player	Recruited from	League	Notes
2012	1	1	Sam Frost	Sandringham Dragons	TAC Cup	-
2013	7	51	Joseph Redfern	Sydney Hills Eagles	NEAFL	-
2013	8	54	Zac Williams	Narrandera	Riverina Football League	-
2014	1	1	Sam Schulz	Greater Western Sydney	AFL	Redrafted player
2016	1	8	Sam Reid	GWS Giants	NEAFL	-
2016	2	26	Daniel Lloyd	Killarney Vale	BDAFL	-
2017	1	2	Jake Barrett	Brisbane Lions	AFL	-
2017	1	15	Tendai Mzungu	Fremantle	AFL	-
2017	2	32	Joel Patfull	Greater Western Sydney	AFL	Patfull retired on 12 October 2016, but was retained on GWS's 2017 list due to Total Player Payment obligations.
2018	1	15	Dylan Buckley	Carlton	AFL	-
2018	2	29	Sam Ried	Greater Western Sydney	AFL	Redrafted player
2020	1	15	Jake Stein	Greater Western Sydney	AFL	Redrafted player
2020	2	28	Tom Sheridan	Greater Western Sydney	AFL	Redrafted player
2020	3	36	Zach Sproule	Greater Western Sydney	AFL	Redrafted player
2021	1	9	Sam Ried	Greater Western Sydney	AFL	Redrafted player
2021	2	24	Zach Sproule	Greater Western Sydney	AFL	Redrafted player
2022	1	13	Cooper Hamilton	Bendigo Pioneers	NAB League	-
2022	2	29	Jacob Wehr	Greater Western Sydney	AFL	Redrafted player
2023	1	3	Phil Davis	Greater Western Sydney	AFL	Redrafted player
2024	1	14	Adam Kennedy	Greater Western Sydney	AFL	Redrafted player
2025	1	11	Lachlan Keeffe	Greater Western Sydney	AFL	Redrafted player
2025	2	22	Jacob Wehr	Greater Western Sydney	AFL	Redrafted player
2025	3	30	Josh Fahey	Greater Western Sydney	AFL	Redrafted player
2026	1	9	Conor Stone	Greater Western Sydney	AFL	Redrafted player

== Category B rookie selections ==
^	Denotes player who has been inducted to the Australian Football Hall of Fame
*	Denotes player who has been a premiership player and been selected for at least one All-Australian team
^{+}	Denotes player who has been a premiership player at least once
^{x}	Denotes player who has been selected for at least one All-Australian team
^{#}	Denotes player who has never played in a VFL/AFL home and away season or finals game
^{~}	Denotes player who has been selected as Rising Star

During the trade period, clubs can nominate category B rookies to join their club.

Giants Category B rookie selections
Year	Player	Origin	Note	Ref.
2017	Jake Stein	Athletics	3-year non-registered player (athletics)	
2017	Zach Sproule	Murray Bushrangers	NSW zone selection	
2018	Jack Buckley	UWS Giants	NSW zone selection	
2019	Callum Brown	Derry GAA	International selection (Ireland)	
2021	Will Shaw	Bendigo Pioneers	Academy selection	
2023	Nicholas Madden	AFL GWS (VFL)	Academy selection	
2023	Jason Gillbee	Bendigo Pioneers	Academy selection	
2024	Nathan Wardius	HFNL	Academy selection	
2025	Josaia Delana	East Coast Eagles	Academy selection	
2026	Riley Hamilton	Ainslie Football Club	Academy selection	

== Mid-season rookie draft ==
The first mid-season draft since 1993 was held after Round 10 of the 2019 AFL season on 27 May. The mid-season draft is only open to clubs with inactive players on their list and vacancies available through long-term injuries or retirements. Players recruited during the mid-season draft earn a contract for the remainder of the season, though have the option of negotiating terms for an extension at any period throughout the season.

^	Denotes player who has been inducted to the Australian Football Hall of Fame
*	Denotes player who has been a premiership player and been selected for at least one All-Australian team
^{+}	Denotes player who has been a premiership player at least once
^{x}	Denotes player who has been selected for at least one All-Australian team
^{#}	Denotes player who has never played in a VFL/AFL home and away season or finals game
^{~}	Denotes player who has been selected as Rising Star

Giants mid-season draft selections
Year	Round	Pick	Player	Recruited from	League	Pick due to
2021	1	8	James Peatling	Greater Western Sydney	VFL	Lachlan Keeffe long-term injury
2022	1	5	Wade Derksen	Peel Thunder	WAFL	Josh Fahey long-term injury

== Academy draft selections ==
^	Denotes player who has been inducted to the Australian Football Hall of Fame
*	Denotes player who has been a premiership player and been selected for at least one All-Australian team
^{+}	Denotes player who has been a premiership player at least once
^{x}	Denotes player who has been selected for at least one All-Australian team
^{#}	Denotes player who has never played in a VFL/AFL home and away season or finals game
^{~}	Denotes player who has been selected as Rising Star

Giants academy draft selections
Year	Round	Pick	Draft	Player	Recruited from	League
2013	9	97	National Draft	Jake Barrett	Temora	Farrer FL
2013	7	51	Rookie Draft	Joseph Redfern	Sydney Hills Eagles	NEAFL
2013	8	54	Rookie Draft	Zac Williams	Narrandera	Riverina Football League
2014	2	24	National Draft	Jack Steele	Belconnen	NEAFL
2014	7	85	National Draft	Jeremy Finlayson	Sydney Hills Eagles	NEAFL
2015	1	7	National Draft	Jacob Hopper	North Ballarat Rebels	TAC Cup
2015	1	13	National Draft	Matthew Kennedy	Collingullie-Glenfield Park	RFNL
2015	1	16	National Draft	Harrison Himmelberg	Mangoplah-CUE	RFNL
2015	3	41	National Draft	Matt Flynn	Narrandera	RFNL
2016	1	5	National Draft	Will Setterfield	Sandringham Dragons	TAC Cup
2016	1	14	National Draft	Harry Perryman	Collingullie-Glenfield Park	RFNL
2016	1	20	National Draft	Isaac Cumming	North Broken Hill	BHFL
2016	4	54	National Draft	Lachlan Tiziani	Murray Bushrangers	TAC Cup
2017	4	64	National Draft	Nick Shipley	St George	Sydney AFL
2017	-	-	Category B rookie	Zach Sproule	Murray Bushrangers	TAC Cup
2018	2	34	National Draft	Kieren Briggs	Pennant Hills	AFL Syd.
2018	-	-	Category B rookie	Jack Buckley	GWS Giants	NEAFL
2019	1	10	National Draft	Tom Green	Canberra Demons	NEAFL
2021	1	8	Mid-season draft	James Peatling	Greater Western Sydney	VFL
2021	3	42	National Draft	Josh Fahey	Queanbeyan Tigers	AFL Canberra
2023	4	59	National Draft	Harvey Thomas	Oakleigh Chargers	Talent League
2023	-	-	Category B rookie	Nathan Wardius	Rand Walbundrie Walla Giants FNC	HFNL
2024	-	-	Category B rookie	Josaia Delana	East Coast Eagles	AFL Sydney
2025	-	-	Category B rookie	Riley Hamilton	Ainslie	AFL Canberra
