= Dale Holmes (footballer) =

Australian rules footballer

Personal information
- Full name: Dale Holmes
- Born: 4 June 1967 (age 59)
- Original team: Myrtleford
- Height: 178 cm (5 ft 10 in)
- Weight: 75 kg (165 lb)

Playing career^{1}
Years	Club	Games (Goals)
1987	North Melbourne	3 (0)
- ^{1} Playing statistics correct to the end of 1987.

Dale Holmes (born 4 June 1967) is a former Australian rules footballer who played with North Melbourne in the Victorian Football League (VFL), where he wore the number 44.

In 2004 Holmes was living in Sydney and was appointed as the General Manager of the AFL (NSW-ACT) Commission. In 2011 he was the first CEO of the expansion team, Greater Western Sydney Giants, but was sacked in October of that year. Outside of football, Holmes works in the financial services industry.
