= Toby McMullin =

Australian rules footballer

- McMullin in 2025

Personal information
- Full name: Toby McMullin
- Born: 6 August 2004 (age 22); Melbourne, Victoria
- Original teams: Sandringham Dragons (Talent League); Port Fairy Football Club
- Draft: No. 34, 2022 national draft
- Debut: Round 22, 2023, Greater Western Sydney vs. Port Adelaide, at Adelaide Oval
- Height: 183 cm (6 ft 0 in)
- Weight: 83 kg (183 lb)
- Position: Forward

Club information
- Current club: Greater Western Sydney
- Number: 31

Playing career^{1}
Years	Club	Games (Goals)
2023–	Greater Western Sydney	34 (8)
- ^{1} Playing statistics correct to the end of round 22, 2026.

Toby McMullin (born 6 August 2004) is a professional Australian rules footballer for the Greater Western Sydney Giants in the Australian Football League (AFL).

He is the son of former Collingwood and Essendon footballer Ian McMullin.

== AFL career ==
McMullin was recruited by Greater Western Sydney with the 34th overall selection in the 2022 national draft.

McMullin debuted for GWS in round 22 of the 2023 AFL season in a 51-point loss to Port Adelaide. He kicked his first goal the following week against Essendon. McMullin became a mainstay in Greater Western Sydney's team in 2024, as he played 14 of a possible 25 games.

== Statistics ==
Updated to the end of round 22, 2026.

Legend
G	Goals	K	Kicks	D	Disposals	T	Tackles
B	Behinds	H	Handballs	M	Marks

Season	Team	No.	Games	Totals							Averages (per game)							Votes
Season	Team	No.	Games	G	B	K	H	D	M	T	G	B	K	H	D	M	T	Votes
2023	Greater Western Sydney	31	3	1	2	10	4	14	3	6	0.3	0.7	3.3	1.3	4.7	1.0	2.0	0
2024	Greater Western Sydney	31	14	6	2	63	59	122	23	38	0.4	0.1	4.5	4.2	8.7	1.6	2.7	0
2025	Greater Western Sydney	31	11	1	6	76	51	127	25	16	0.1	0.5	6.9	4.6	11.5	2.3	1.5	0
2026	Greater Western Sydney	31	6	0	4	29	30	59	11	8	0.0	0.7	4.8	5.0	9.8	1.8	1.3	0
Career			34	8	14	178	144	322	62	68	0.2	0.4	5.2	4.2	9.5	1.8	2.0	0
