= Zach Sproule =

Australian rules footballer (born 1998)

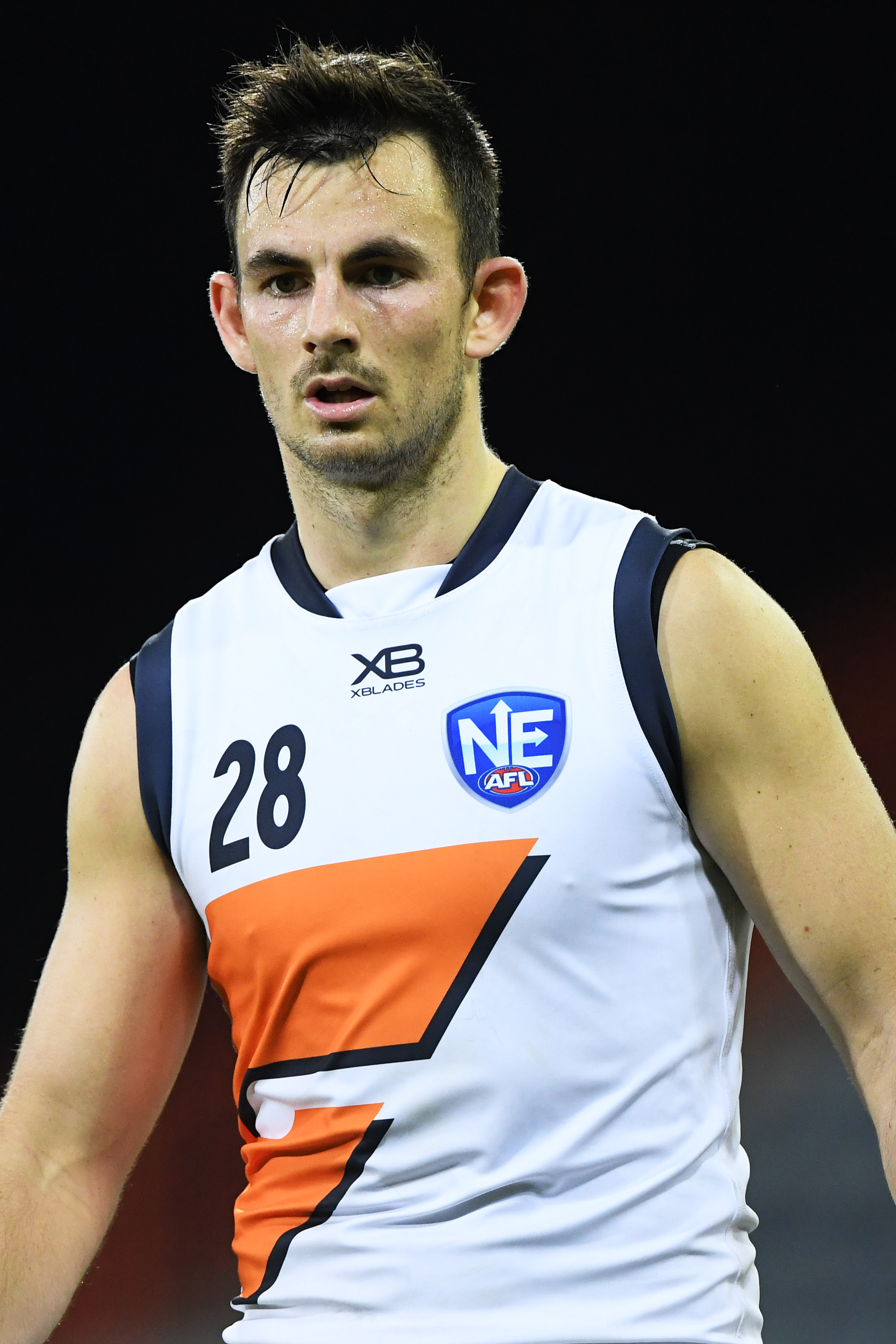
- Sproule playing for Greater Western Sydney in July 2019

Personal information
- Born: 12 May 1998 (age 28)
- Original team: Murray Bushrangers
- Draft: 2016 Category B rookie selections, NSW zone selection
- Debut: 18 August 2019, Greater Western Sydney vs. Western Bulldogs
- Height: 197 cm (6 ft 6 in)
- Weight: 92 kg (203 lb)
- Position: Key Forward

Club information
- Current club: Greater Western Sydney
- Number: 28

Playing career
Years	Club	Games (Goals)
2019–2022	Greater Western Sydney	17 (13)

Career highlights
- 4× GWS VFL leading goalkicker: 2017, 2018, 2019, 2021

Zach Sproule (born 12 May 1998) is an Australian rules footballer who plays for the Greater Western Sydney in the Australian Football League (AFL). He joined the club as a Category B rookie selections coming from the Giants Academy. He made his senior debut against Western Bulldogs in round 22 of the 2019 season. Zach signed with the South Adelaide Football Club in the SANFL for the 2023 season.
