= Ryan Angwin =

Australian rules football player

Personal information
- Full name: Ryan Angwin
- Born: 12 December 2002 (age 23)
- Original team: Gippsland Power
- Draft: No. 18, 2020 national draft
- Debut: Round 14, 2022, Greater Western Sydney vs. Western Bulldogs, at Giants Stadium
- Height: 185 cm (6 ft 1 in)
- Weight: 81 kg (179 lb)
- Position: Midfielder

Club information
- Current club: Greater Western Sydney
- Number: 9

Playing career^{1}
Years	Club	Games (Goals)
2022–	Greater Western Sydney	48 (10)
- ^{1} Playing statistics correct to the end of round 22, 2026.

Ryan Angwin (born 12 December 2002) is a professional Australian rules footballer playing for the Greater Western Sydney Giants in the Australian Football League (AFL).

== Early life ==
Angwin is a left footed footballer from Foster, Victoria. He debuted with his local side, Foster as a fifteen year old. Talent scouts spotted his silky skills and high footy IQ. He was set for a big 2020 in the under 18 competition but the season was cancelled because of the COVID-19 pandemic.

He was drafted with the 18th selection in the 2020 AFL draft from Gippsland Power in the NAB League.

== AFL career ==
Ryan made his debut in round 14 of the 2022 season when the Giants played the Western Bulldogs in Giants Stadium. Unfortunately he suffered a broken Tibia and missed the rest of the season.

== Statistics ==
Updated to the end of round 22, 2026.

Legend
G	Goals	K	Kicks	D	Disposals	T	Tackles
B	Behinds	H	Handballs	M	Marks

Season	Team	No.	Games	Totals							Averages (per game)							Votes
Season	Team	No.	Games	G	B	K	H	D	M	T	G	B	K	H	D	M	T	Votes
2022	Greater Western Sydney	9	1	0	0	1	2	3	1	1	0.0	0.0	1.0	2.0	3.0	1.0	1.0	0
2023	Greater Western Sydney	9	15	1	1	62	84	146	31	33	0.1	0.1	4.1	5.6	9.7	2.1	2.2	0
2024	Greater Western Sydney	9	4	1	2	24	26	50	9	16	0.3	0.5	6.0	6.5	12.5	2.3	4.0	0
2025	Greater Western Sydney	9	10	1	0	83	83	166	36	40	0.1	0.0	8.3	8.3	16.6	3.6	4.0	0
2026	Greater Western Sydney	9	18	7	3	143	158	301	57	51	0.4	0.2	7.9	8.8	16.7	3.2	2.8	0
Career			48	10	6	313	353	666	134	141	0.2	0.1	6.5	7.4	13.9	2.8	2.9	0
