= Nick Shipley =

Australian rules footballer

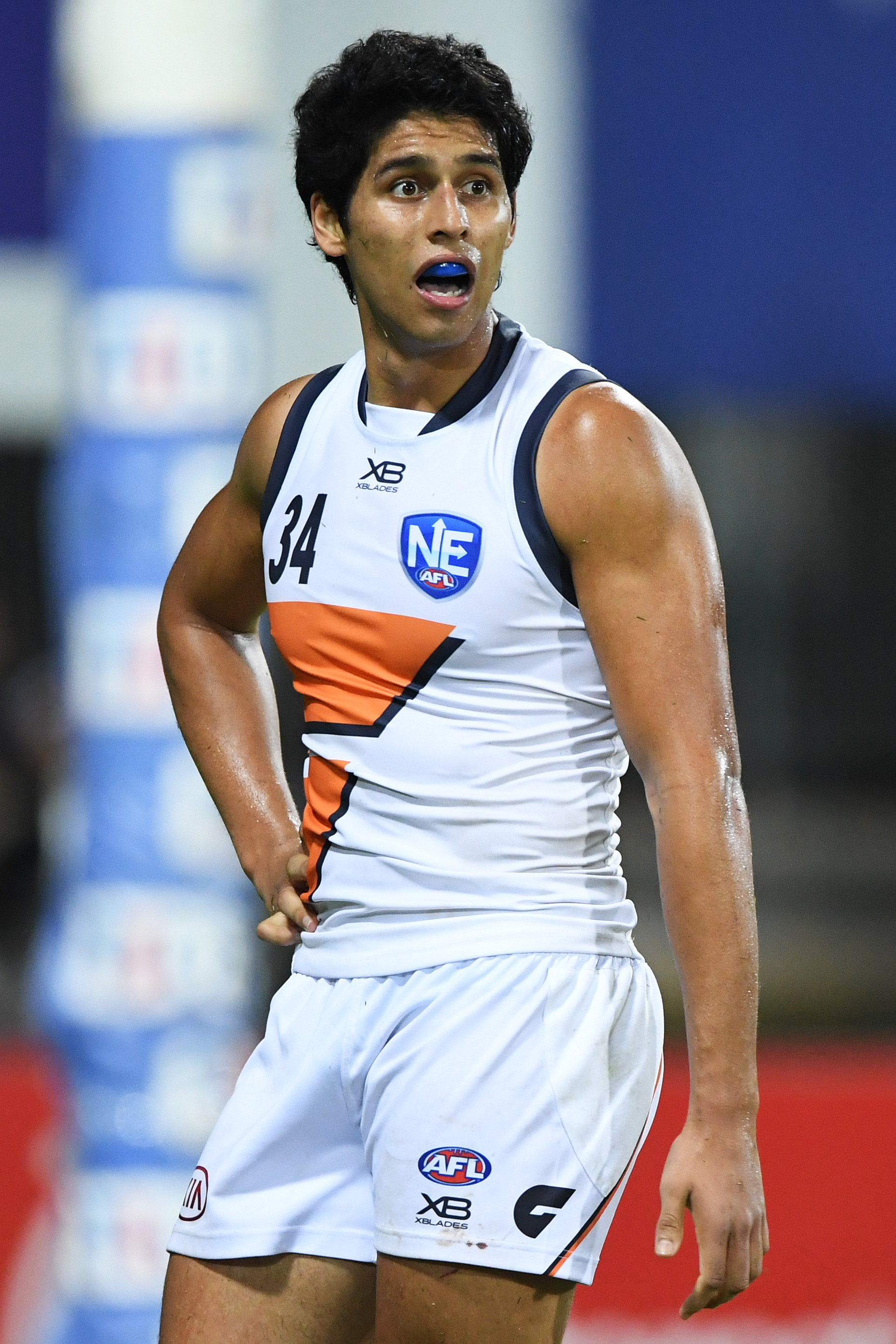
- Shipley playing for Greater Western Sydney in July 2019

Personal information
- Born: 25 June 1999 (age 27); Campbelltown
- Original team: St George (NSW)
- Draft: Pick 64, 2017 AFL draft
- Debut: Greater Western Sydney vs. Brisbane Lions, at Spotless Stadium
- Height: 188 cm (6 ft 2 in)
- Weight: 95 kg (209 lb)
- Position: Midfielder

Club information
- Current club: Sydney reserves
- Number: 52

Playing career^{1}
Years	Club	Games (Goals)
2018–2021	GWS Giants	6 (0)
- ^{1} Playing statistics correct to the end of round 7, 2018.

Nick Shipley (born 25 June 1999) is an Australian rules footballer who currently serves as the captain of the Sydney Swans in the Victorian Football League (VFL). He previously played professionally for the Greater Western Sydney Giants in the Australian Football League (AFL). Shipley made his debut in round 6 against the Brisbane Lions at Spotless Stadium. He was the first graduate of the Giants Academy from the Western Sydney region to play for GWS.

Shipley grew up in Campbelltown and originally wanted to play for A-League club Sydney FC. His mother Jessica was born in Peru and moved to Sydney as a child. He was recruited by the Giants Academy and drafted by GWS in the 2017 AFL draft with pick 64 as an academy selection.

He was delisted at the conclusion of the 2021 AFL season, finishing with a total of 6 senior AFL games.

Ahead of the 2025 VFL season, Shipley was appointed as the captain of the Sydney Swans reserves team.
