= Max Gruzewski =

Australian rules footballer (born 2004)

Personal information
- Full name: Max Gruzewski
- Nickname: Gru
- Born: 21 July 2004 (age 22)
- Original team: Surrey Park/Caulfield Grammar/Oakleigh Chargers
- Draft: No. 22, 2022 national draft
- Debut: Round 15, 2024, Greater Western Sydney vs. Sydney, at Sydney Showground Stadium
- Height: 192 cm (6 ft 4 in)
- Weight: 84 kg (185 lb)
- Position: Key Forward

Club information
- Current club: Greater Western Sydney
- Number: 35

Playing career^{1}
| Years | Club | Games (Goals) |
| 2023– | Greater Western Sydney | 24 (31) |
- ^{1} Playing statistics correct to the end of round 22, 2026.

Career highlights
- 2× Greater Western Sydney VFL leading goalkicker (2023, 2024)

Max Gruzewski (born 21 July 2004) is a professional Australian rules footballer for the Greater Western Sydney Giants in the Australian Football League (AFL).

== AFL career ==
Gruzewski was recruited by Greater Western Sydney with the 22nd overall selection in the 2022 national draft.

Gruzewski debuted for GWS in round 15 of the 2024 AFL season in a twenty-seven-point loss to Sydney.

== Statistics ==
Updated to the end of round 22, 2026.

Legend
| G | Goals | K | Kicks | D | Disposals | T | Tackles |
| B | Behinds | H | Handballs | M | Marks |

| Season | Team | No. | Games | Totals | | | | | | | Averages (per game) | | | | | | | Votes |
| Season | Team | No. | Games | G | B | K | H | D | M | T | G | B | K | H | D | M | T | Votes |
|---|---|---|---|---|---|---|---|---|---|---|---|---|---|---|---|---|---|---|
| 2023 | Greater Western Sydney | 35 | 0 | — | — | — | — | — | — | — | — | — | — | — | — | — | — | 0 |
| 2024 | Greater Western Sydney | 35 | 4 | 3 | 0 | 9 | 3 | 12 | 6 | 1 | 0.8 | 0.0 | 2.3 | 0.8 | 3.0 | 1.5 | 0.3 | 0 |
| 2025 | Greater Western Sydney | 35 | 7 | 10 | 5 | 27 | 17 | 44 | 19 | 7 | 1.4 | 0.7 | 3.9 | 2.4 | 6.3 | 2.7 | 1.0 | 0 |
| 2026 | Greater Western Sydney | 35 | 13 | 18 | 9 | 73 | 36 | 109 | 48 | 9 | 1.4 | 0.7 | 5.6 | 2.8 | 8.4 | 3.7 | 0.7 | 0 |
| Career | | | 24 | 31 | 14 | 109 | 56 | 165 | 73 | 17 | 1.3 | 0.6 | 4.5 | 2.3 | 6.9 | 3.0 | 0.7 | 0 |
