= Jack Buckley (footballer, born 1997) =

Australian rules footballer

Personal information
- Full name: Jack Buckley
- Born: 17 December 1997 (age 28); Sydney, New South Wales
- Original team: UNSW-Easts (Sydney AFL)
- Draft: 2017 Category B Rookie Selection
- Debut: 12 September 2020, Greater Western Sydney vs. Melbourne, at The Gabba
- Height: 193 cm (6 ft 4 in)
- Weight: 87 kg (192 lb)
- Position: Key defender

Club information
- Current club: Greater Western Sydney
- Number: 44

Playing career^{1}
Years	Club	Games (Goals)
2018–	Greater Western Sydney	94 (1)
- ^{1} Playing statistics correct to the end of round 22, 2026.

Career highlights
- BackChat Backman of the Year Award: 2023

Jack Buckley (born 17 December 1997) is an Australian rules footballer who plays for the Greater Western Sydney Football Club in the Australian Football League (AFL). He was selected by the Greater Western Sydney Football Club as a Category B rookie from the NSW zone in 2017. He is the son of former Australian rules footballer and former chairman of the North Melbourne Football Club, Ben Buckley.

== Early football ==
Buckley played junior football for the Maroubra Saints, where he played in their Under 16 division's premiership. Buckley played for the UNSW-Eastern Suburbs Bulldogs in the Sydney AFL league. He was recruited as a part of the Sydney's academy team at the age of 12, but quit 3 years later at the age of 15 after he found the academy 'too intense'. In the 8th round of his 2017 season with the Bulldogs, he won the league's rising star nomination after kicking four goals in his team's win.

== AFL career ==
Despite being signed as a Category B rookie in late 2017, Buckley did not debut for the Giants until late into the 2020 AFL season. After a strong 2020 pre-season, in one game kicking 7 goals in a 93-point win over the Canberra Football Club alongside teammate Jake Riccardi, Buckley debuted in Greater Western Sydney's 5-point loss to Melbourne in the 17th round of the 2020 AFL season. Upon debut, Buckley collected 12 disposals, 3 marks, 3 tackles and a clearance. Buckley was upgraded from the rookie list at the conclusion of the season.

=== Isaac Heeney mark ===
In GWS's 2024 qualifying final against Sydney, Sydney player Isaac Heeney took what many to be considered Mark of the Year with a high-flying specky over Buckley, although Heeney was ineligible for the award due to it being in a finals match, something that attracted criticism in the press. In any case, Buckley received widespread respect and acclaim for his act of sportsmanship for holding Heeney's hand to ensure his fall was safe, as Heeney was otherwise falling head-first and could have suffered a severe injury had Buckley not intervened. Among the many that praised Buckley's quick thinking, Heeney's own mother public thanked Buckley on Facebook.

== Statistics ==
Updated to the end of round 22, 2026.

Legend
G	Goals	K	Kicks	D	Disposals	T	Tackles
B	Behinds	H	Handballs	M	Marks

Season	Team	No.	Games	Totals							Averages (per game)							Votes
Season	Team	No.	Games	G	B	K	H	D	M	T	G	B	K	H	D	M	T	Votes
2018	Greater Western Sydney	41	0	—	—	—	—	—	—	—	—	—	—	—	—	—	—	0
2019	Greater Western Sydney	44	0	—	—	—	—	—	—	—	—	—	—	—	—	—	—	0
2020 (Note: The 2020 season was played with 17 home-and-away matches per team (down from 22) and 16-minute quarters with time on (down from 20-minute quarters with time on) due to the impact of the COVID-19 pandemic.)	Greater Western Sydney	44	2	0	0	11	8	19	7	5	0.0	0.0	5.5	4.0	9.5	3.5	2.5	0
2021	Greater Western Sydney	44	15	0	2	112	57	169	68	34	0.0	0.1	7.5	3.8	11.3	4.5	2.3	0
2022	Greater Western Sydney	44	0	—	—	—	—	—	—	—	—	—	—	—	—	—	—	0
2023	Greater Western Sydney	44	26	0	0	198	143	341	114	79	0.0	0.0	7.6	5.5	13.1	4.4	3.0	0
2024	Greater Western Sydney	44	23	1	0	202	117	319	133	46	0.0	0.0	8.8	5.1	13.9	5.8	2.0	0
2025	Greater Western Sydney	44	19	0	0	144	89	233	111	29	0.0	0.0	7.6	4.7	12.3	5.8	1.5	0
2026	Greater Western Sydney	44	9	0	0	65	35	100	33	12	0.0	0.0	7.2	3.9	11.1	3.7	1.3	0
Career			94	1	2	732	449	1181	466	205	0.0	0.0	7.8	4.8	12.6	5.0	2.2	0
