= Greater Western Sydney Giants =

Australian rules football club

- An editor has nominated the above file for discussion of its purpose and/or potential deletion. You are welcome to participate in the discussion and help reach a consensus.

Names
- Full name: Western Sydney Football Club Limited, trading as Greater Western Sydney Football Club
- Nickname(s): Giants, GWS, Orange Team

2026 season
- After finals: AFL: 12th VFL: N/A
- Home-and-away season: AFL: 12th VFL: 12th
- Leading goalkicker: AFL: Jake Stringer (48 goals); VFL: Ryan Hebron (31 goals)
- Kevin Sheedy Medal: Lachlan Ash

Club details
- Founded: 2009; 17 years ago
- Colours: Orange Charcoal White
- Competition: AFL: Senior men AFLW: Senior women VFL: Reserves men
- CEO: James Avery
- Coach: AFL: Adam Kingsley; AFLW: Cameron Bernasconi; VFL: Trent Dennis-Lane
- Captain(s): AFL: tba AFLW: Rebecca Beeson; VFL: Ryan Hebron
- Number-one ticket holder(s): Mitchell Starc and Alyssa Healy
- Premierships: AFL (0); NEAFL (1): 2016
- Ground: AFL/AFLW/VFL: Engie Stadium (23,500) & Manuka Oval (16,000); AFLW: Henson Park (20,000) VFL: Tom Wills Oval (1,000) & Narrandera Sportsground (14,000)
- Former ground: Blacktown Oval (2010–2013); Stadium Australia (2012–2013)
- Training ground: Tom Wills Oval

Uniforms
| Home | Away | Alternate |

Other information
- Official website: gwsgiants.com.au

The Greater Western Sydney Giants (officially the Greater Western Sydney Football Club, colloquially known as the GWS Giants or simply GWS, Giants) is a professional Australian rules football club based in the Western Sydney region of Sydney, New South Wales.

The Giants compete in the Australian Football League (AFL), and entered the league in 2012 as the competition's 18th active club. The club train at Tom Wills Oval in the Olympic Park and play most home matches at Sydney Showground Stadium, also located within the Olympic Park precinct. In addition it plays up to four home matches per season at Manuka Oval in Canberra as part of a deal with the ACT Government.

The Giants commenced competing in the AFL in March 2012. After struggling initially and claiming consecutive wooden spoons in their first two seasons, the club reached finals for the first time in 2016 and qualified for its first Grand Final in 2019, where they were defeated by Richmond by 89 points. As of 2025, the club has qualified for the finals eight times.

The Giants also operate other teams outside of the AFL. The club has fielded a team in the AFL Women's league since 2017 and a reserves team in the Victorian Football League (VFL) since 2021 and the Greater Western Sydney Giants Academy, consisting of the club's best junior development signings, contests Division 2 of the men's and women's underage national championships and the Talent League. A netball team, known as Sydney Sirens competes in the Suncorp Super Netball.

== History ==
=== Early proposals ===
The idea of an AFL team from western Sydney originated from the AFL's plans in 1999 to make the North Melbourne Football Club Sydney's second team. Following the momentum of the relocated Swans Grand Final appearance, the AFL had backed the move for North Melbourne, a club which had then previously gained market exposure by defeating the Swans in their first re-location Grand Final appearance. However, the venture was unsuccessful and after several games a season North Melbourne never managed to draw crowds of over 15,000 at the Sydney Cricket Ground before finally leaving the market for Canberra.

The AFL's interest in the Western Sydney market appeared to be rekindled after the Sydney Swans' second, more successful Grand Final appearance in 2005. In 2006, the AFL introduced the NSW Scholarships scheme also known as the Talented Player Program (TPP), primarily aimed at juniors in West Sydney market to foster home grown talent and produce AFL players, a region which despite its large and growing population, had prior to the program, produced few professional Australian Footballers. The AFL was buoyed when it gained the support of then NSW premier Morris Iemma in late 2006, and the league became a partner in the Blacktown sporting facility in Rooty Hill, New South Wales. The facility was announced as the new home base for its team out of western Sydney in 2007; it announced that it had planned to grant its 18th licence in mid to late 2008. In January 2008, the AFL officially registered the business name Western Sydney Football Club Ltd with ASIC.

In March 2008, it was revealed by the media that the AFL had considered a radical proposal to launch an Irish-dominated team in Sydney's western suburbs, which would perform before an international audience under the "Celtic" brand name. At the time, the Irish Experiment was peaking with numerous Irish players in the AFL. The "Sydney Celtics" plan was first put to AFL chief executive Andrew Demetriou in early 2007 by Gaelic Players Association executive Donal O'Neill. It was said that the proposal originated at the International Rules series in Ireland in late 2006 when O'Neill put forward a plan to purchase an AFL licence in Sydney. The idea had been boosted by the hype generated by Tadhg Kennelly's appearance for Sydney in the AFL Grand Final, having become one of the club's better locally known players. However, the idea never materialised and the AFL has since stated that this was never a serious option.

=== Formation ===
==== Establishment support ====
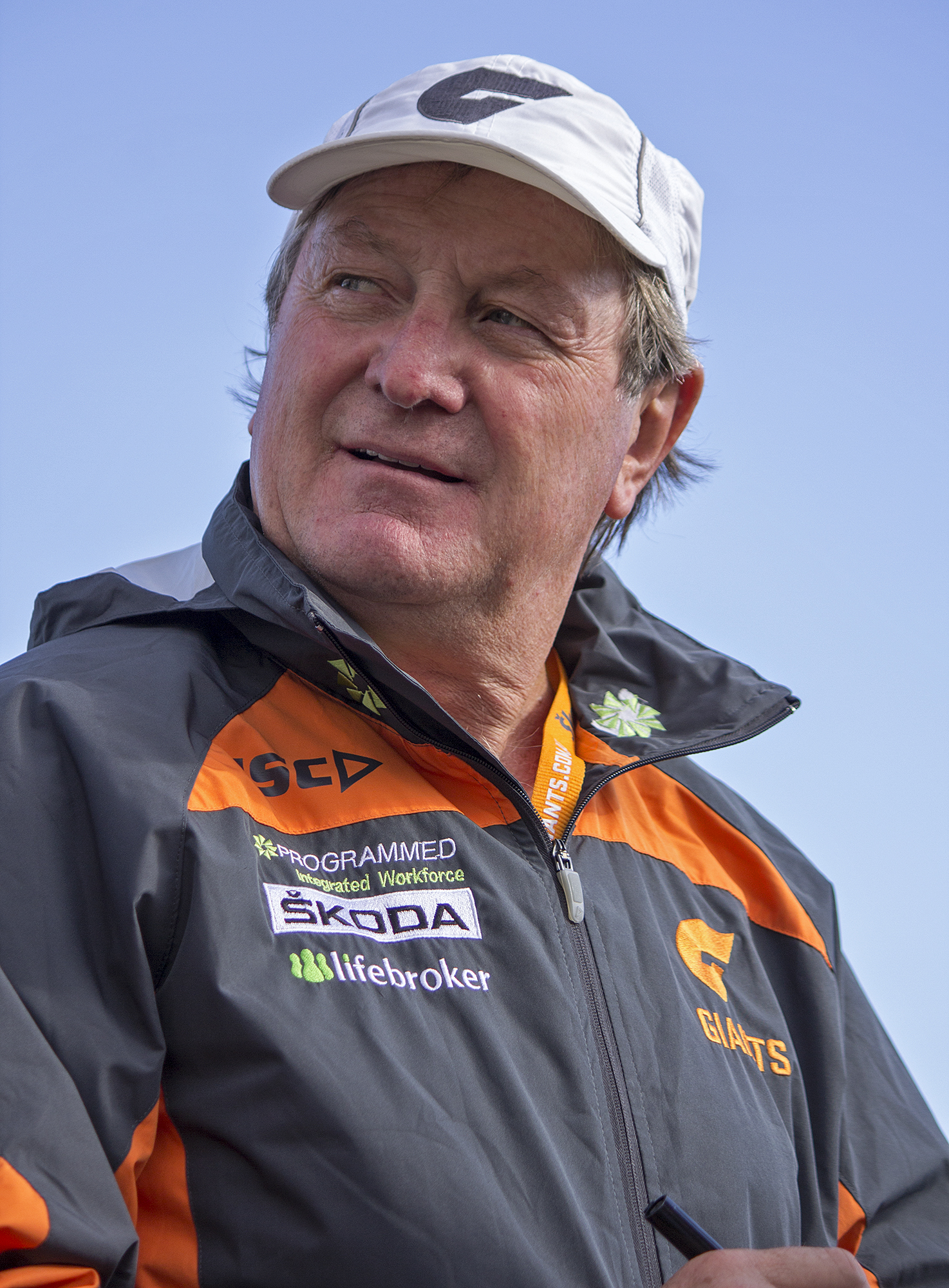
The AFL helped secure Kevin Sheedy as inaugural coach

In March 2008, the AFL won the support of the league's 16 club presidents to establish an eighteenth side in Western Sydney. The Western Sydney working party devising player rules and draft concessions for the second Sydney team met on 22 July 2008.

During 2008, the AFL Commission, whose agenda was to make a final decision on the Western Sydney Football Club, delayed it on multiple occasions. During the same year, in November, the AFL announced a A$100 million venture to redevelop a stadium originally built for baseball at the Sydney Olympics, into a boutique AFL stadium at the Sydney Showground, in the city's west.

After a third meeting in Sydney in November, the AFL cited the 2008 financial crisis as being a key factor in the delays. While the AFL reiterated its stance on the Western Sydney licence, the commission admitted that the delay in the decision was due to financial remodelling of the bid in response to the crisis, and conceded that the debut of the team in the AFL may eventuate one or more seasons later than initially suggested. The expansion licence drew increasing media scepticism and public criticism, particularly in the light of a poor finals attendance in Sydney, declining Sydney Swans attendances and memberships, the 2008 financial crisis and the Tasmanian AFL Bid which had gained significant momentum and public support during 2008. An Australian Senate enquiry into the Tasmanian AFL Bid concluded that Sydney had "insurmountable cultural barriers" to the establishment of a second AFL team.

In May 2009, AIS/AFL Academy coach Alan McConnell was appointed as the club's high performance manager. McConnell was the first full-time appointment for GWS and his new role commenced on 1 July 2009. Kevin Sheedy was appointed inaugural coach in November 2009, signing a three-year contract. His role commenced on 2 February 2010. His first senior assistant coach was former premiership coach of Port Adelaide, Mark Williams. Williams left the role at the conclusion of 2012, in order to become a development coach at the Richmond Tigers.

In November 2010 Skoda Australia was announced as the team's first major sponsor, signing a three-year contract which included naming rights to the team's home ground at the Sydney Showground. SpotJobs became a sponsor in March 2015. They featured on the back of the Giants' playing guernseys for home matches in Sydney and Canberra and on the front of the guernseys for all the team's away games for that year only. Currently, Virgin Australia, Toyo Tyres and St. George bank are the main sponsors, along with apparel partner, Puma.

On 4 October 2012, Greater Western Sydney confirmed Leon Cameron as its new senior assistant coach for 2013. This role expanded to Senior Coach which he held for nine years before resigning from his position in May 2022.

=== Establishment in Western Sydney ===
In 2007 the NSW government, Blacktown City Council, Cricket NSW and the AFL agreed to the development of an AFL/Cricket centre at Blacktown International Sportspark at a cost of $27.5 million. The agreement between Blacktown City Council and the AFL was an 84-year (21 x 4) agreement. The breakdown of contributors of funding was the NSW Government $15 million, Blacktown City Council $6.75m, Cricket NSW $2.875 million and AFL $2.875 million.

The development included;

- a main AFL/Cricket Oval that has the same dimensions as the Melbourne Cricket Ground
- a second oval
- 1600 seat grandstand
- function facilities; and
- Indoor cricket practice centre.

Blacktown International Sports centre was officially opened on 22 August 2009.

On 15 April 2012, the Giants played their first and only regular season AFL premiership game against West Coast Eagles in front of a crowd of 6,875 at Blacktown International Sportspark. The final score being Giants 10.9 (69) – Eagles 23.12 (150).

In April 2013, an $11.6 million redevelopment of a former golf driving range into a new AFL training ground and multicultural community education centre commenced, signalling the relocation of GWS to the suburb of Sydney Olympic Park. Greater Western Sydney Giants presence at the complex from 2010 to 2014 was concluded with the movement of the senior team 27 km east to Sydney Olympic Park. This move was supported by the NSW Government which spent an additional $45 million to upgrade the Sydney Showground Stadium at Sydney Olympic Park providing a new home for the Western Sydney AFL team.

Concessions on entry into the AFL
| Year | Draft picks | Senior list size | Salary cap allowance | Zone access | Notes |
|---|---|---|---|---|---|
| 2011 | - | - | - | 4 NSW; 2 NT | The club was allowed to sign up to twelve 17-year-olds born between 1 January and 30 April 1993. The club also received the first 8 picks in the rookie draft. |
| 2012 | 1, 2, 3, 5, 7, 9, 11, 13, 15; MD: 1,2 | 50 | $1,000,000 extra | 4 NSW; 2 NT | At the conclusion of the 2011 season the club was able to sign up to 16 current AFL players who were uncontracted for the 2012 season. The club was also allowed to sign up to 10 players who had previously elected for the national draft and weren't selected. |
| 2013 | MD: 1,2 | 50 | $1,000,000 extra | 4 NSW; 2 NT | At the conclusion of the 2012 season the club was able to sign up to 16 current AFL players who were uncontracted for the 2013 season. The club was also allowed to sign up to 10 players who had previously elected for the national draft and weren't selected. |
| 2014 | AFL Standard | 50 | $1,000,000 extra | AFL Standard | - |
| 2015 | AFL Standard | 48 | $880,000 extra | AFL Standard | - |
| 2016 | AFL Standard | 46 | $760,000 extra | AFL Standard | - |
| 2017 | AFL Standard | 44 | AFL standard | AFL Standard | - |
| 2018 | AFL Standard | 42 | AFL standard | AFL Standard | - |
| 2019 | AFL Standard | AFL standard | AFL standard | AFL standard | All concessions removed and the club operates like every other team in the AFL. |

The entry concessions ended up being removed ahead of schedule at the end of the 2016 AFL season.

==== Player recruitment ====
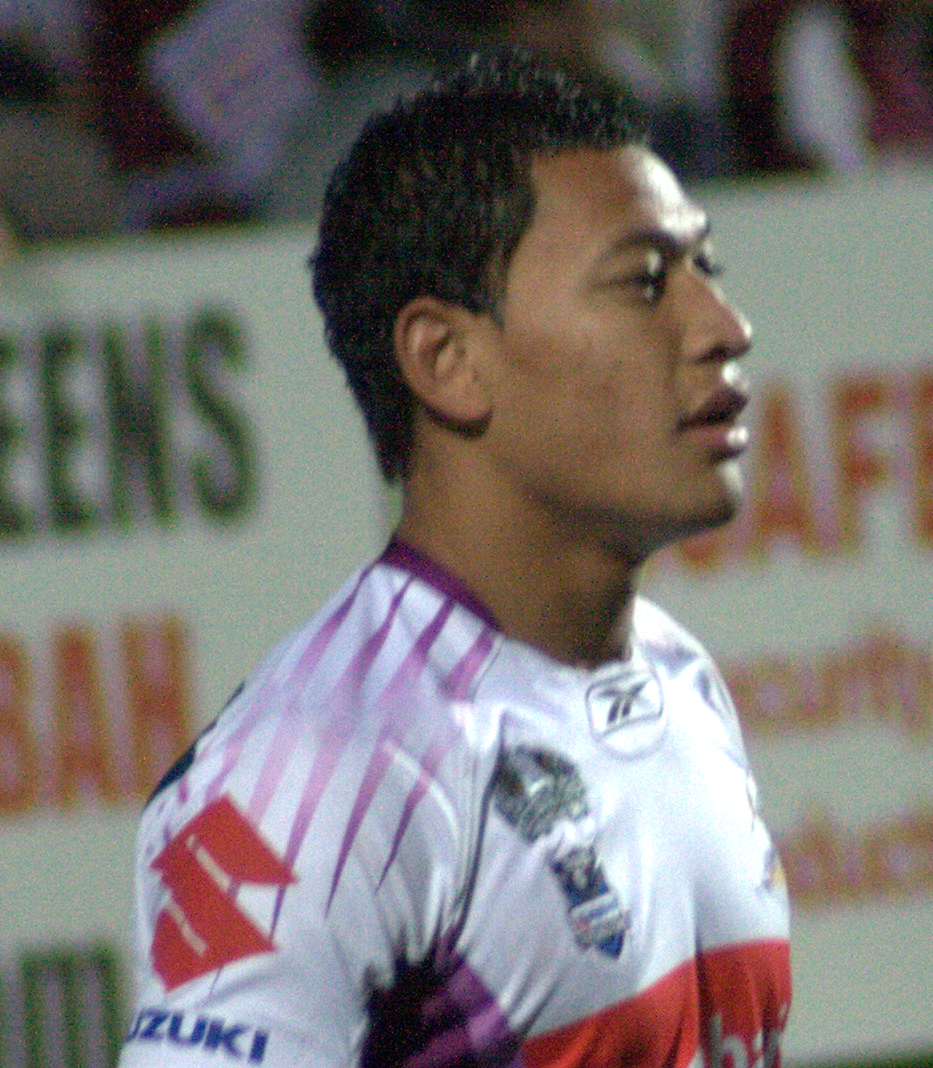
Israel Folau, a high-profile recruit by the club. The former professional rugby league and rugby union footballer was from the Brisbane Broncos. Folau has been credited with helping to establish the Giants in Western Sydney.

Greater Western Sydney were provided with similar recruitment entitlements to the Gold Coast who had entered the AFL the year before the Giants. Key differences included that their access to an uncontracted player from each other AFL club was able to be acted on in either 2011 or 2012. The club was also allocated the ability to trade up to four selections in a "mini-draft" of players born between January and April 1994, that would otherwise not be eligible to be drafted until the 2012 AFL draft. They also were given the first selection in each round of the 2011 AFL draft as well as selections 2, 3, 5, 7, 9, 11, 13 and 15 in the first round of the draft.

The 2011 Trade Week saw the Giants take part in nine trades, involving two selections in the mini-draft as well trading away players who had previously nominated for the draft in return for additional early draft selections in the 2011 AFL draft, that resulted in them holding the first five draft selections and 11 of the first 14.

During the 2011 season, there was much speculation about which uncontracted players would sign with the Giants. In August 2011, Adelaide defender Phil Davis became the first player to announce that he would sign with the new club. During 2011, four more AFL listed players announced they would be playing for the Giants in 2012 – Bulldogs midfielders Callan Ward and Sam Reid, Fremantle midfielder Rhys Palmer and Melbourne midfielder Tom Scully.

Former Melbourne Captain James McDonald, Brisbane veteran Luke Power and Port Adelaide ruckman Dean Brogan and midfielder Chad Cornes came out of retirement to play for the Giants in 2012. McDonald and Power took on roles as playing Assistant Coaches.

Greater Western Sydney also recruited Israel Folau, a former professional rugby league and rugby union footballer, from the Brisbane Broncos on a promotional salary of more than $6 million over four years despite him having never heard of the sport before.

Player signings
| Player | Former club | Date (Note: refers to the date the signing was announced, rather than the date on which the player actually signed.) | Compensation (Note: any club that loses an uncontracted player to Greater Western Sydney is eligible to at least one compensation pick in the AFL draft, depending on the age and ability of the player concerned.) |
|---|---|---|---|
| Phil Davis | Adelaide | 2 August 2011 | One first-round draft pick. |
| Callan Ward | Western Bulldogs | 5 September 2011 | One first-round draft pick. |
| Rhys Palmer | Fremantle | 6 September 2011 | One end-of-first-round draft pick. |
| Tom Scully | Melbourne | 12 September 2011 | Two first-round draft picks. |
| Sam Reid | Western Bulldogs | 13 October 2011 | One third-round draft pick. |

=== 2012: Debut season ===
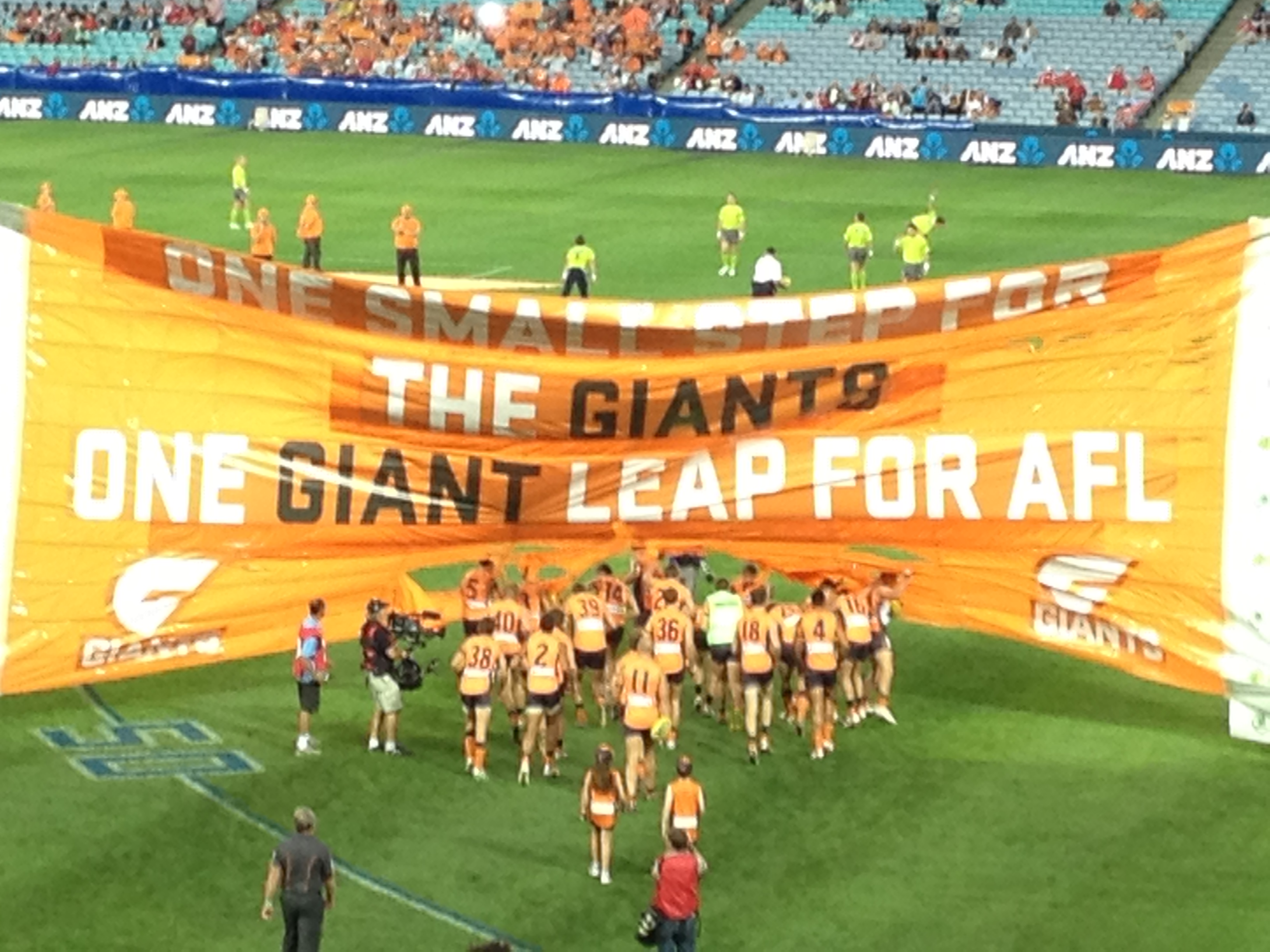
Banner at the inaugural GWS game against the Sydney Swans

Chart of yearly ladder positions for Greater Western Sydney in AFL

Before entering the AFL, the club played in the TAC Cup in 2010 and North East Australian Football League in 2011, as well as the 2011 and 2012 AFL pre-season tournaments, and the 2011 Foxtel Cup.

The club played its first game in the Australian Football League on 24 March 2012 at ANZ Stadium in the inaugural Sydney Derby against the Sydney Swans which they lost by 63 points. On 12 May 2012 the club recorded its first win, defeating the Gold Coast Suns in a round 7 match by 13.16 (94) to 9.13 (67). The only other victory of the team's inaugural season was a 34-point win over Port Adelaide.

The Giants were to have numerous big losses, including five by over 100 points, beating the previous record of four set by Fitzroy in their final season, the Brisbane Bears in 1991, St Kilda in 1985 and Footscray in 1982. They lost four other games by over eighty points and finished with a percentage of 46.17, the lowest by any club since St Kilda, in 1955, had a percentage of 45.4 and, before that, Melbourne in 1919 with 43.0.

=== 2013: Second season ===
In their second season, Greater Western Sydney fared even worse than in their debut season. The Giants lost their first seventeen games, an ignominy suffered previously by Fremantle in 2001, St. Kilda in 1910 and seven teams who finished with an 0–18 record. The most recent of these VFL/AFL teams losing all eighteen games was Fitzroy in 1964. Greater Western Sydney's combined percentage for their first two seasons was indeed the lowest by any club since St. Kilda in 1901 and 1902. Furthermore, the Giants again lost five games by 100 points or more, repeating an ignominy from the debut season.

In round 19, they avoided becoming the fourteenth club in VFL and AFL history to finish a season winless, winning their solitary game for the season against Melbourne to snap a 21-game losing streak. Leading into the final round of the home-and-away season, Jeremy Cameron had kicked 62 goals to this point in the season and was equal third in the race for the Coleman Medal, two goals behind leader Jarryd Roughead.

At the end of the season, coach Kevin Sheedy stood aside for Leon Cameron, who had been assistant to Sheedy in 2013. On 19 December 2013, it was announced that Sheedy had been appointed to the club's board. Club Chairman, Tony Shepherd, highlighted Sheedy's importance when he said, "In many ways Kevin Sheedy is the father of the Giants. He's been here from the start and has helped build the Giants."

=== 2014: Third season ===
Greater Western Sydney started their third season impressively winning two of their first three games, including beating their much-fancied cross-town rivals, the Sydney Swans 15.9 99 to 9.13 67 in their first round encounter at Spotless Stadium. They would eventually finish 16th (6 wins 16 losses), which was enough to avoid the Wooden Spoon for the first time. On 13 May 2014, Greater Western Sydney midfielder Toby Greene was charged with a number of offences including assault with a dangerous weapon and intentionally causing serious injury over an alleged assault in a Melbourne licensed venue the previous night.

=== 2015: Fourth season ===
Before the start of the 2015 AFL Season, the Giants managed to sign Ryan Griffen in addition to re-signing Jeremy Cameron. The club overall had a fairly successful season, finishing 11th with 11 Wins and 11 Losses, including a victory over eventual premiers, Hawthorn.

=== 2016: Fifth season ===
The Giants' fifth season was their best yet, as they recorded their first positive win–loss ratio (16 wins, 6 losses), qualified for their first finals series and finished 4th out of 18 teams on the ladder.

A major highlight of the Giants' 2016 season was their 75-point win over three-time reigning premiers Hawthorn in round 6. Although they had beaten the Hawks by ten points in 2015, and went into the rematch as favourites, a margin of this size was unexpected. They also recorded their largest average home crowd in a season so far (12,333), and new recruit Steve Johnson kicked 43 goals in his first year at the Giants. The Giants finished fourth on the ladder after round 23, which meant they secured a double chance for the upcoming finals series. With cross-town rivals the Sydney Swans finishing as minor premiers, the mechanics of the AFL finals system meant that the Giants would play their first final in their five-year history against the Swans in Sydney.

In their first final, the Swans hosted the Giants at Stadium Australia (ANZ Stadium), with 60,222 spectators attending the match; at the time, this was the largest ever crowd for a match involving the club. The Giants only fielded six players who had previously played an AFL final, conversely, the Swans had six players who were making their finals debut. After a close first half, forward Jeremy Cameron kicked three goals in a five-minute period during the third quarter, as the Giants won by 36 points. The win was marred by an incident involving Steve Johnson, in which he collided with Swan Josh Kennedy and was subsequently suspended for one match; this meant he missed the preliminary final.

Two weeks later, in the preliminary final, the Giants faced the Western Bulldogs at Spotless Stadium, competing for a place in the 2016 AFL Grand Final in only their fifth year. In a close affair, both physically and on the scoreboard, the Bulldogs were attempting to make their first Grand Final in 55 years, while the Giants were looking to capitalise on their recent strong form. The Bulldogs led for most of the first half and went into half-time with a nine-point lead. In the third quarter, the Giants kicked three goals to lead by 11 points, but by three-quarter-time their lead had been reduced to one point. Early in the fourth quarter, the Giants kicked two quick goals to lead by 14 points, but the Bulldogs would kick two goals in response to take the lead, and, after scores were level with five minutes of game time remaining, a goal from Jack Macrae saw the Bulldogs win the match by six points. After the match, coach Leon Cameron said that the pre-finals bye did not have any effect on the club's performance.

=== 2017 season ===
There was a lot of outside expectation on the club leading into 2017. A lot of the media were talking up the side as eventual premier, thanks to the club's run in the second half of 2016.

In the off season the club traded want-away player Cam McCarthy to Fremantle along with picks 7, 34 & 72 for pick 3 in the draft. Canberra academy player Jack Steele was traded to St Kilda for a future second round pick. Paul Ahern was traded to North Melbourne for pick 69. Will Hoskin-Elliott was traded to the Collingwood Football Club for a future second round pick. Continuing the club's trading with Carlton Football Club, they offloaded Caleb Marchbank, Jarrod Pickett (like Ahern, a high draft pick who never played a game for the club) Rhys Palmer and the club's 2nd round pick in the 2017 draft for Geelong's first round pick in the 2017 draft and picks 45, 58 and 135. The club traded in Richmond player, and former first round draft pick, Brett Deledio using Geelong's first round pick acquired from Carlton and its own third round pick.

With its picks in the 2016 draft and the acquisition of Deledio via trade, the club added Tim Taranto, Will Setterfield (academy), Harry Perryman (academy), Isaac Cumming (academy), Lachlan Tiziani (academy) and Matt de Boer via the national draft, and another former de-listed Docker in Tendai M'Zungu in the Rookie Draft.

The club reached the top 4 despite injuries during the year. Josh Kelly had a breakout year, all the while weighing up a return to his father's former club, North Melbourne, on a rumoured 7-year, $11,000,000 contract. He refused that offer and re-signed before the club's final series. The side yet again fell at the second last hurdle, once again losing to eventual premiers, Richmond Football Club in front of a crowd of 94,000, the biggest crowd the club has played in front of.

=== 2018 season ===
A hit-and-miss 2018 season saw the Giants finish seventh on the AFL ladder with 13 wins, eight losses and one draw. Despite losing just once in their first six games, they would go on to suffer a four-game losing streak which temporarily knocked them out of the top eight. They recovered brilliantly with nine wins in their next ten matches before losses to Sydney and Melbourne in the final two rounds of the regular season prevented them from finishing in the top four for a third consecutive year. They dominated Sydney by 49 points in the second elimination final at the SCG before losing to eventual runners-up Collingwood by ten points in the second semi-final.

At the conclusion of the season, foundation players Dylan Shiel and Tom Scully were traded to Essendon and Hawthorn respectively. Two-gamer Will Setterfield was also traded to Carlton.

=== 2019 season ===
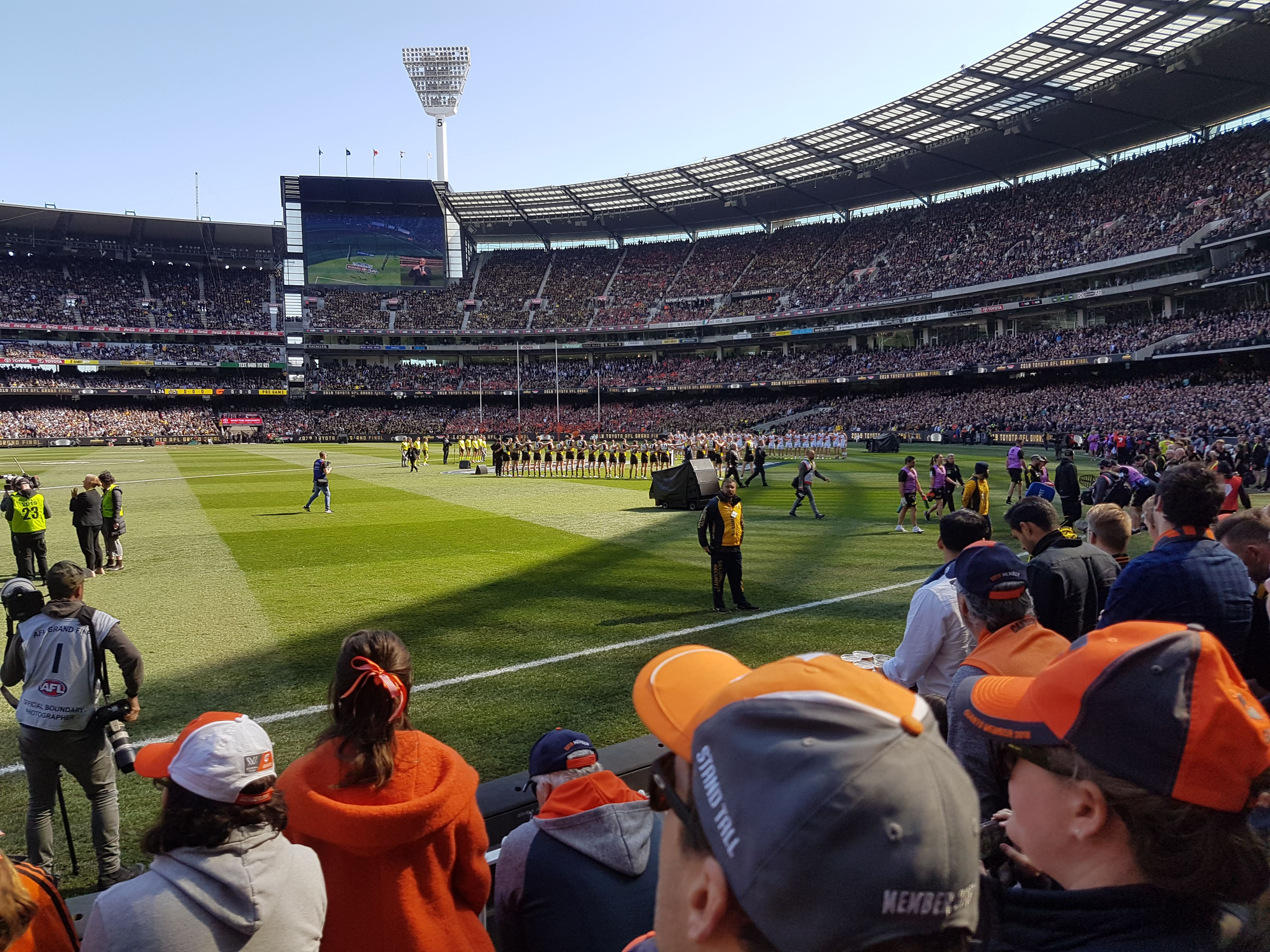
GWS and Richmond players ahead of the 2019 AFL Grand Final

Greater Western Sydney qualified for their fourth consecutive finals series in 2019, finishing sixth on the AFL ladder with 13 wins and nine losses. They suffered a major setback early in the year when co-captain Callan Ward was struck down with an ACL injury during the club's round four victory over Geelong and was subsequently sidelined for the rest of the season.

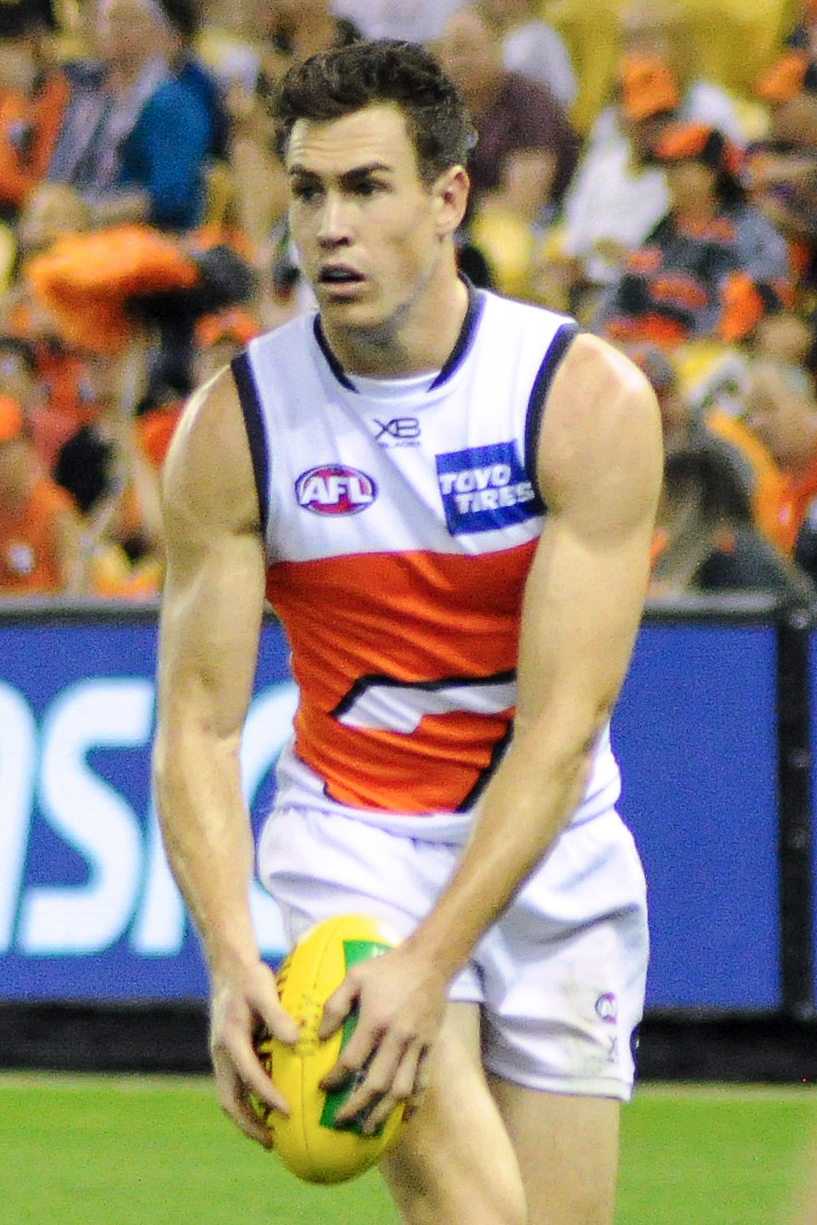
Jeremy Cameron, 2019 Coleman Medallist

Jeremy Cameron became the first GWS player to win the Coleman Medal as the leading goal scorer in the competition, kicking 67 goals during the home-and-away season. He notably scored nine goals in the final round of the season against Gold Coast to win the award outright, after trailing North Melbourne's Ben Brown by six goals heading into the match.

The Giants entered the 2019 finals series with unconvincing form, particularly after two very poor performances against Hawthorn and the Western Bulldogs in rounds 21 and 22 respectively, and were expected by some to exit the finals quickly. However, they defied the odds and would eventually bound into their first ever grand final. The Giants emphatically turned the tables on the Bulldogs – who had humiliated them on their own home ground just three weeks prior – in the second elimination final to the tune of 58 points. Then, they defeated the Brisbane Lions by three points in a classic semifinal at the Gabba before holding on to defeat Collingwood by four points in an equally enthralling preliminary final. In doing so, the Giants became only the second team since the introduction of the AFL final eight system in 2000 to reach the grand final without earning a spot in the top four, after the Bulldogs qualified for the 2016 decider from seventh position (and would eventually win that year's premiership).

They met 2017 premiers Richmond in the 2019 AFL Grand Final on 28 September. They were thoroughly outplayed by the Tigers, who won their second flag in three years by a margin of 89 points – one of the heaviest defeats ever suffered in a Grand Final in the history of the VFL/AFL.

At the conclusion of the season, foundation player Adam Tomlinson was traded to Melbourne, confirmed on Tuesday 8 October 2019. A predicted transfer of inaugural #1 draft pick Jonathon Patton being traded to Hawthorn also occurred. 2017 first-round draft pick Aiden Bonar was traded to North Melbourne Football Club in the final minutes of the trade period. The Giants got in veteran Sam Jacobs from the Adelaide Crows Football Club, an exemplary ruck of his day, to strengthen their ruck stocks.

=== 2020 season ===
Greater Western Sydney entered the 2020 AFL season looking to atone for their humiliating defeat in the grand final. However, despite some early optimism, the Giants' season was a major disappointment. Inconsistent performances throughout the season resulted in the Giants finishing tenth and missing the finals for the first time since 2015. They became the third team in four years to miss the finals after playing in the previous year's decider, after 2016 premiers the Western Bulldogs and 2017 runners-up Adelaide.

=== 2021: Tenth season ===
During the trading period prior to the start of the 2021 AFL season, star player and former Coleman Medallist Jeremy Cameron was traded to Geelong as a restricted free agent along with two second round draft picks for three first round draft picks and one fourth round draft pick. The Giants also traded away defenders Zac Williams for one first round draft pick, and Aiden Corr for one second round pick to Carlton and North Melbourne respectively.

The Giants also announced two new guernsey designs for both home and away games in conjunction with the team's 10th season in the AFL.

The Giants started their 2021 season with three consecutive losses before upsetting Collingwood in the 4th round by 30 points. Injuries plagued the Giants at the start of the season, with high-profile recruits Jesse Hogan and Braydon Preuss, along with star defender Lachie Whitfield, injuring themselves during the preseason. Senior players Matt de Boer, Phil Davis, and captain Stephen Coniglio were also all injured during the Giants round 3 game against Melbourne.

Despite these injuries, GWS would go on to upset Sydney during their round 5 clash at the SCG, with the Giants winning by two points against an undefeated Sydney side.

Due to a major COVID outbreak in New South Wales, GWS, as well as their crosstown rival Sydney, spent the final two months of the home-and-away season away from the state. The Giants were able to navigate this period well and booked a fifth finals appearance in six seasons, finishing seventh on the AFL ladder with 11 wins, 10 losses and a draw.

GWS would meet Sydney in a final for the third time, and the first outside of New South Wales, with the match being relocated to University of Tasmania Stadium in Launceston. The Giants once again prevailed over their crosstown rival, defeating the Swans by one point in a thrilling elimination final.

The Giants’ season, however, came to an end the following week after losing to Geelong by 35 points in the second semi final at Optus Stadium.

=== 2022 season ===
GWS had a difficult 2022 season, winning just 6 of their 22 games and finishing 16th on the ladder. The Giants popular long-time coach Leon Cameron stood down after 9 years with the club ahead of their round 9 clash against Carlton following a slow start of 2 wins and 6 losses. Mark McVeigh was announced as the Giants interim coach for the remainder of the 2022 season winning 4 of his 13 games in charge. Adam Kingsley was named senior coach of GWS on 22 August 2022.

=== 2023 season ===
Despite modest expectations of success ahead of Kingsley's first season as coach, 2023 would prove to be an unforgettable year for Greater Western Sydney. Despite sitting as low as 15th on the ladder midyear, a strong finish to the season saw the Giants break into the finals for the sixth time in eight seasons, finishing seventh with a 13–10 record. The Giants would eventually qualify for their fourth preliminary final after comfortable victories over St Kilda and Port Adelaide in the elimination final and semi final respectively. Greater Western Sydney's fairytale campaign would end in heartbreak after losing to eventual premiers Collingwood by one point in the prelim. Kingsley was officially named as the AFL Coaches Association Senior Coach of the Year after an outstanding first season at the helm.

=== 2024 season ===
Greater Western Sydney would have a solid but ultimately disappointing 2024 season. Five consecutive wins to start the year and seven consecutive victories in the final two months earned the Giants the double chance for the first time since 2017, entering September in fourth position with a 15–8 win-loss record. Spearhead Jesse Hogan would claim the second Coleman Medal in club history after scoring 69 goals in the home-and-away season.

Unfortunately, more finals heartbreak would eventuate for the Giants; after leading against the Sydney Swans at 3 quarter time (48-69) & against Brisbane (92-67), they would bow out in straight sets in the qualifying final and semi final respectively, having squandered commanding leads in both matches. Jesse Hogan would finish the 2024 season with 77 goals, one more than Jeremy Cameron (76) in 2019, setting a club record for Greater Western Sydney.

At an end of season function, thirteen players were found to have breached the AFL's rules on conduct unbecoming, with seven players including Captain Toby Greene fined $5000 for not intervening when eight players performed skits that included players reenacting the September 11 attacks, and simulated sex while dressed as controversial sporting figures. Josh Fahey was suspended for four matches, while Jake Riccardi, Joe Fonti, Toby McMullin, Harvey Thomas and Cooper Hamilton were suspended for two.

=== 2025 season ===
Greater Western Sydney once again put themselves in the conversation for a premiership in 2025, but would continue to come up short. The Giants had another solid year, finishing fifth on the ladder with a 16–7 win-loss record to play finals for the eighth time in 10 seasons. However, their season ended in heartbreak yet again, falling to their earliest finals exit after a 19-point loss to Hawthorn in a seesawing elimination final.

== Draft ==
| Denotes current player |

Number 1 draft selections
| Year | Player | Recruited from | League | GWS Games |
|---|---|---|---|---|
| 2011 | Jonathon Patton | Eastern Ranges | TAC Cup | 89 |
| 2012 | Lachie Whitfield | Dandenong Stingrays | TAC Cup | 278 |
| 2013 | Tom Boyd | Eastern Ranges | TAC Cup | 9 |
| 2022 | Aaron Cadman | Greater Western Victoria Rebels | NAB League | 77 |

== Club symbols and identity ==
=== Name ===
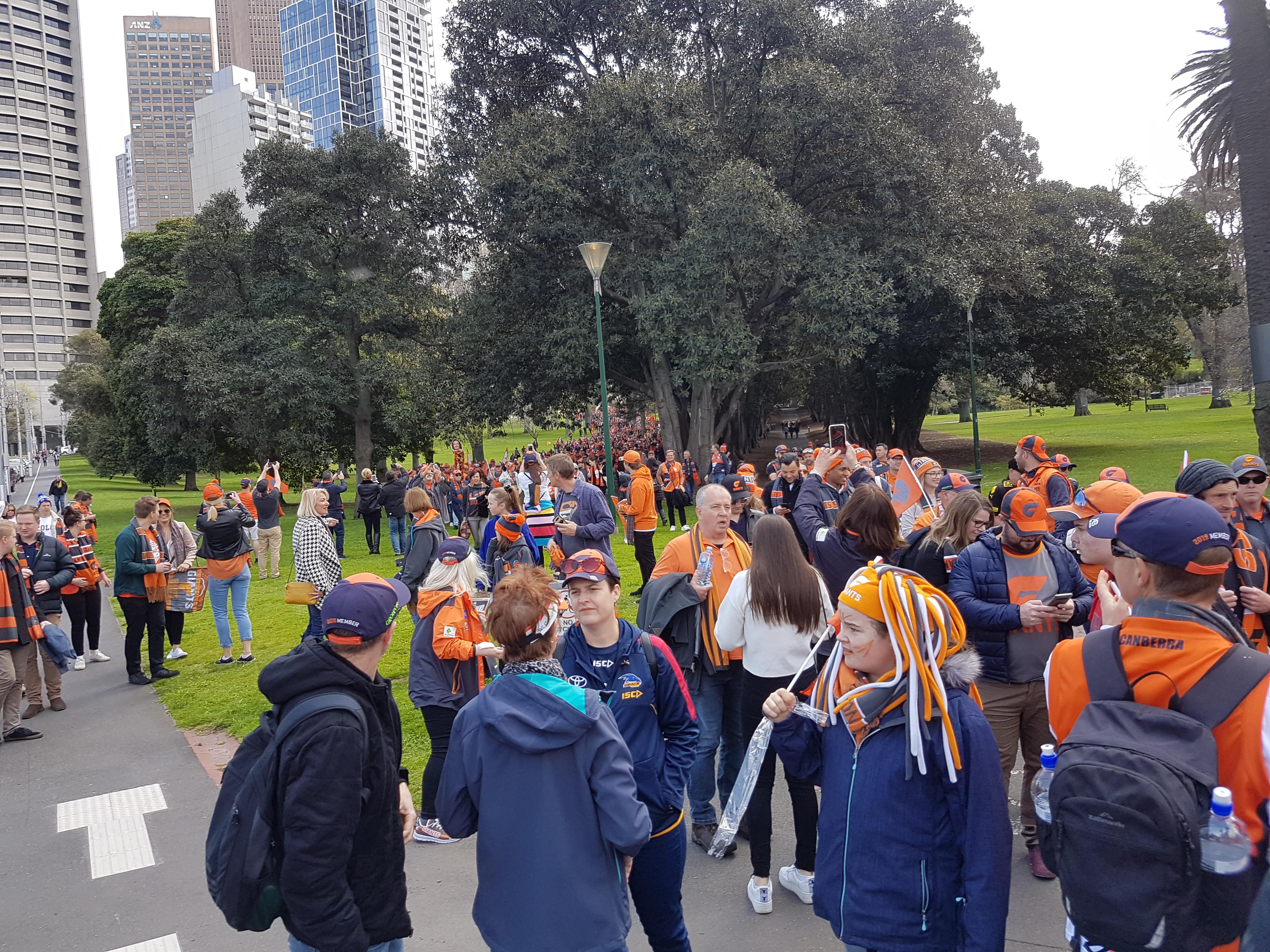
Giants fans walk towards the MCG ahead of 2019 AFL Grand Final

On 16 November 2010, Greater Western Sydney announced their club guernseys and their nickname of the "Giants". The club self-styles its nickname in capital letters GIANTS in all of its media.

During Round 21 of the 2022 season, commentator Kelli Underwood inadvertently coined a new nickname for GWS when she commented, "It has been seven consecutive goals to the ... orange team". It quickly caught on with fans and was even acknowledged by the club itself, who listed "the Orange Team" on their official social media accounts.

=== Colours and guernsey ===
The team colours are orange, charcoal and white, with the club unveiling two prospective home jumpers for fans to be decided on for the inaugural 2012 season. One was orange with a stylised charcoal "G" in the centre and charcoal side panels on the sides, with the other featuring an orange yoke in the top half and a white "G" wrapped around charcoal colours in the bottom half. The colour of the team's shorts is charcoal and their socks are orange with charcoal fold-downs. During the 2011 season, a clash guernsey was unveiled. The jumper has a light grey background with a charcoal rendition of the home jumper's G on the chest. This was altered in the 2012 season for a white jumper with charcoal collar and cuffs, charcoal "G" symbol in the centre and orange and charcoal stylised shoulder pads. Their Canberra guernsey is the same as their home, but with a simplified Telstra Tower next to the "G".

The clash guernsey changed in 2014, to a white top with a G that was slightly smaller than the home jumper. Included on the guernsey was also a diagonal section of charcoal from the players left cuff down towards the centre of the bottom hem. This is repeated on the back, with the orange "G" being replaced with an orange line next to the charcoal section. The guernsey featured charcoal cuffs, numbers and collar. From the 2021 season, Puma will produce the club's on-and-off-field apparel.

=== Mascot ===
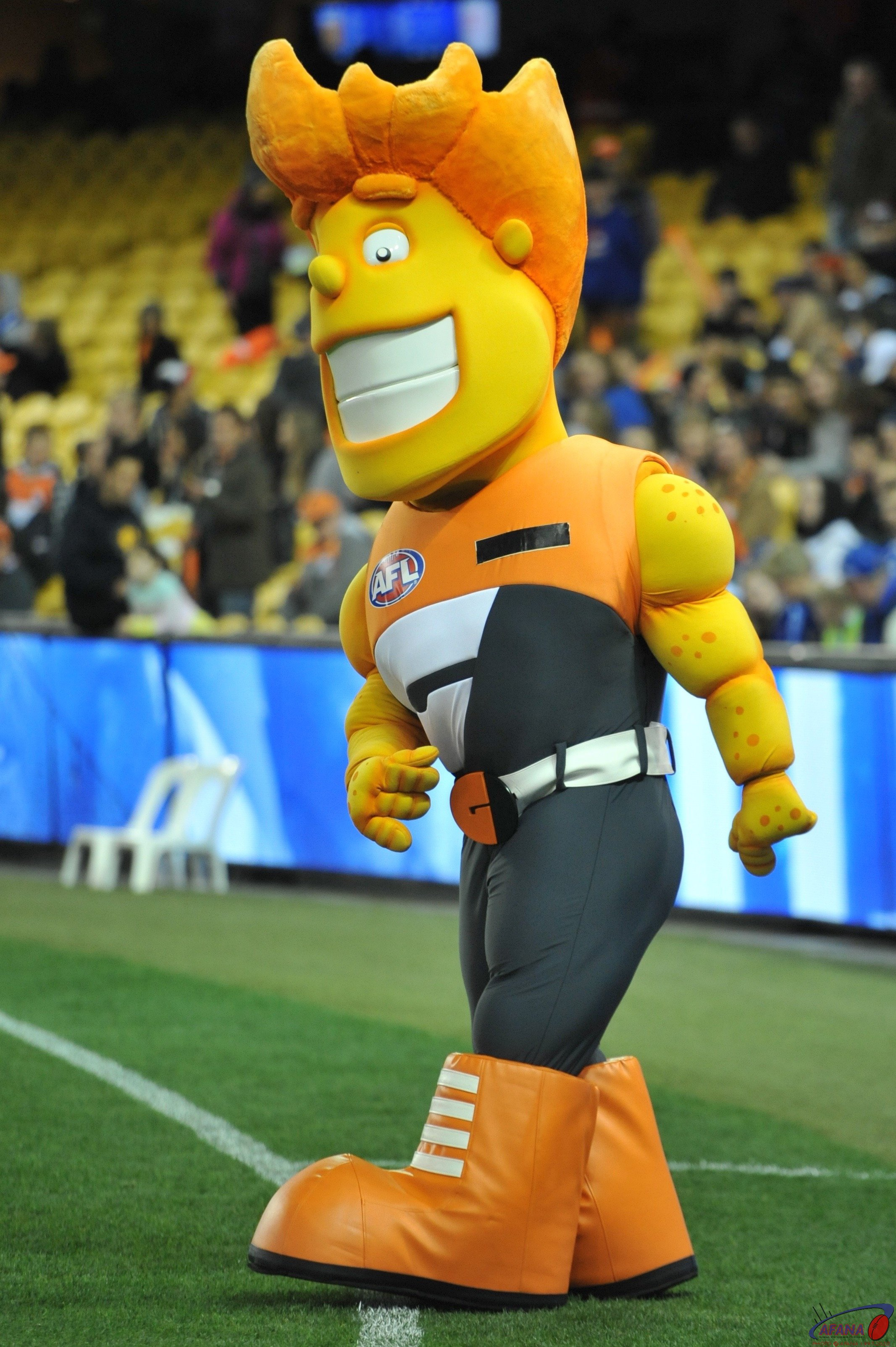
GWS mascot G-Man

Their mascot G-Man was unveiled on 18 February 2012 before the team took the ground for their first NAB Cup match. The club ran a competition for its members to name the AFLW mascot for the side during the 2017 AFLW Season. In the 2018 AFLW Season, the mascot Gigi was unveiled.

=== Song ===
The club song "There's a Big Big Sound" was written and produced by Harry Angus of the Australian band The Cat Empire. Intended as a throwback to traditional football songs, it has "won rave reviews from neutral fans" while also being compared to Soviet propaganda due to its brassy, marching-band style. The song became an Internet meme in 2019 when the Giants made it to that year's Grand Final. The phrase "the Big Big Sound" has since become an informal nickname for the club.

== Rivalries ==
=== Sydney Swans ===
The GWS Giants's entry to the AFL in 2012 resulted in the formation of the Sydney Derby/Battle of the Bridge with their rivalry with Sydney Swans, between the two Sydney based AFL clubs. The best performed player from every derby match is awarded the Brett Kirk Medal.

Initially, the rivalry was a one-sided affair in favour of the Swans, who won 8 of the first 9 derbies. Following that, the Giants made the series much more even, winning 6 out of the next 9 derbies. As of 2025, the derby record stands at 20-11 in the Swan's favour. The Sydney Derby has been played 4 times in the finals, with the Giants winning 3 out of 4 meetings.

=== Western Bulldogs ===
The Giants have engaged in a bitter rivalry with Western Bulldogs since the 2016 AFL season finals series. In the final moments of the first preliminary final, both teams were on top of each other trying to win the game, with the Bulldogs trying to make their first AFL grand final appearance in 55 years, while the Giants would be trying to make their first ever. Despite leading by 14 points at one stage in the final quarter, the Giants lost to the eventual premiers by six points.

Since then, the two clubs would continue to play each other in the following seasons, with the Giants continuingly winning over the Bulldogs in heated games. In 2017, GWS star Toby Greene kicked Bulldogs player Luke Dahlhaus in the face while contesting a bouncing ball, starting an all-in brawl. It wasn't until round 22 of the 2019 home-and-away season that the Giants would be beaten by the Bulldogs again, on the same ground of that of the famous 2016 preliminary final. Three weeks later, in week one of the 2019 AFL finals series, the two faced off in the 2nd elimination final, where the Giants would thump the Bulldogs in a 58-point win. In that game, the Giants and Bulldogs would engage in fights on field with GWS player Toby Greene attacking Western Bulldogs captain Marcus Bontempelli in apparent retribution for Bontempelli fracturing part of the neck of Nick Haynes two games earlier in round 22, which the Bulldogs won by a similar margin. A similar event would occur in week 3 of the 2020 home-and-away season, where the two teams engaged in constant melees throughout a match that the Giants lost by 25 points. The overall series record stands at 12-7 in the Bulldogs favor.

== Corporate ==
=== Governance ===
The club is a wholly owned subsidiary of the AFL Commission which elects seven of the nine members of its board with the two remaining being elected by the club members.

=== Membership base and sponsors ===
| Year | Members | Regular season home crowd | Ladder position (league standings) | Best final |
|---|---|---|---|---|
| 2012 | 10,241 (Note: 5,000 Canberra members) | 10,824 (Note: Sydney Showground (6g) – 8,087. Manuka Oval (3g) – 8,431. ANZ (1g) – 38,203. Blacktown ISP (1g) – 6,875) | 18/18 | |
| 2013 | 12,681 (Note: 3,000 Canberra members) | 9,701 (Note: Sydney Showground (7g) – 8,281. Manuka Oval (3g) – 8,352. ANZ (1g) – 23,690.) | 18/18 | |
| 2014 | 13,047 | 9,226 (Note: Sydney Showground (8g) – 9,609. Manuka Oval (3g) – 8,208.) | 16/18 | |
| 2015 | 13,115 | 10,786 (Note: Sydney Showground (8g) – 11,032. Manuka Oval (3g) – 10,132.) | 11/18 | |
| 2016 | 15,311 (Note: 7,000 Canberra members) | 12,333 (Note: Sydney Showground (8g) – 12,126. Manuka Oval (3g) – 12,886.) | 4/18 | Preliminary final |
| 2017 | 20,944 (Note: 4,268 Canberra members) | 13,196 (Note: Sydney Showground (8g) – 13,456. Manuka Oval (3g) – 12,502.) | 4/18 | Preliminary final |
| 2018 | 25,243 (Note: 4,089 Canberra members) | 11,913 (Note: Sydney Showground (8g) – 12,411. Manuka Oval (3g) – 11,686.) | 7/18 | Semi-Final |
| 2019 | 30,108 (Note: 7,500 Canberra members) | 12,267 (Note: Sydney Showground (8g) – 11,999. Manuka Oval (3g) – 11,884.) | 6/18 | Grand Final |
| 2020 | 30,841 | 2,232 (Note: Sydney Showground (8g) – 2,244.) | 10/18 | |
| 2021 | 30,185 (Note: 7,163 Canberra members) | 7,163 (Note: Sydney Showground (6g) – 6,272. Manuka Oval (2g) – 9,814.) | 7/18 | Semi-Final |
| 2022 | 32,614 (Note: 5,800 Canberra members) | 9,219 (Note: Sydney Showground (6g) – 6103. Manuka Oval (4g) – 9,804. ANZ (1g) – 25,572.) | 16/18 | |
| 2023 | 33,036 (Note: 6,400 Canberra members) | 10,161 (Note: Sydney Showground (6g) – 6,272. Manuka Oval (2g) – 9,814.) | 7/18 | Preliminary Final |
| 2024 | 36,629 (Note: 7,000 Canberra members) | 12,275 | 4/18 | Semi-Final |
| 2025 | 37,705 (Note: 7,500 Canberra members) | 12,206 | 5/18 | Elimination Final |

==== Sponsorship ====
| Year | Kit manufacturer | Major sponsor | Shorts sponsor | Back sponsor |
|---|---|---|---|---|
| 2012–13 | ISC | Skoda Auto (home) Lifebroker (away) | Dyldam | Lifebroker (home) Skoda Auto (away) |
| 2014 | ISC | Virgin Australia (Home) Lifebroker (away) | Dyldam | Lifebroker (home) Virgin Australia (away) |
| 2015 | BLK | Virgin Australia (home) Spotjobs (away) | Dyldam | Spotjobs (home) Virgin Australia (away) |
| 2016 | BLK | Virgin Australia (home) Toyo Tires (away) | Dyldam | Toyo Tires (home) Virgin Australia (away) |
| 2017–18 | XBlades | Virgin Australia (home) Toyo Tires (away) | Dyldam | Toyo Tires (home) Virgin Australia (away) |
| 2019–20 | XBlades | Toyo Tires (home) Virgin Australia (away) | Kia Motors | Virgin Australia (home) Toyo Tires (away) |
| 2021–24 | Puma | Toyo Tires (home) Harvey Norman (away) | Kia Motors | Harvey Norman (home) Toyo Tires (away) |
| 2024– | New Balance | Toyo Tires, Mirvac | Aware Super | Harvey Norman |

== Home Grounds, Training and administration facilities ==
The Giants' training facility and offices are known as the WestConnex Centre and Tom Wills Oval, located at Sydney Olympic Park opposite the State Sports Centre. The main oval is named in honour of Australian football pioneer Tom Wills, who was born in New South Wales and has family connections to Western Sydney.

=== Home grounds ===
The Giants play the majority of their home matches at Sydney Showground Stadium (known commercially as Engie Stadium), which is also located in the Olympic Park precinct adjacent to Stadium Australia. The club plays four home games per season at Manuka Oval (three regular season, one preseason), having signed a 10-year deal with the government of the Australian Capital Territory in 2012 worth $23 million. A Canberra logo is incorporated on its guernsey, with a slightly altered Canberra-specific guernsey used for the games at Manuka. The Giants also played in a special guernsey as part of the centenary of Canberra celebrations, stating that the team is "part of the Canberra community". A GWS/ACT Academy has also been envisioned, and the territory has representation on the club's board.

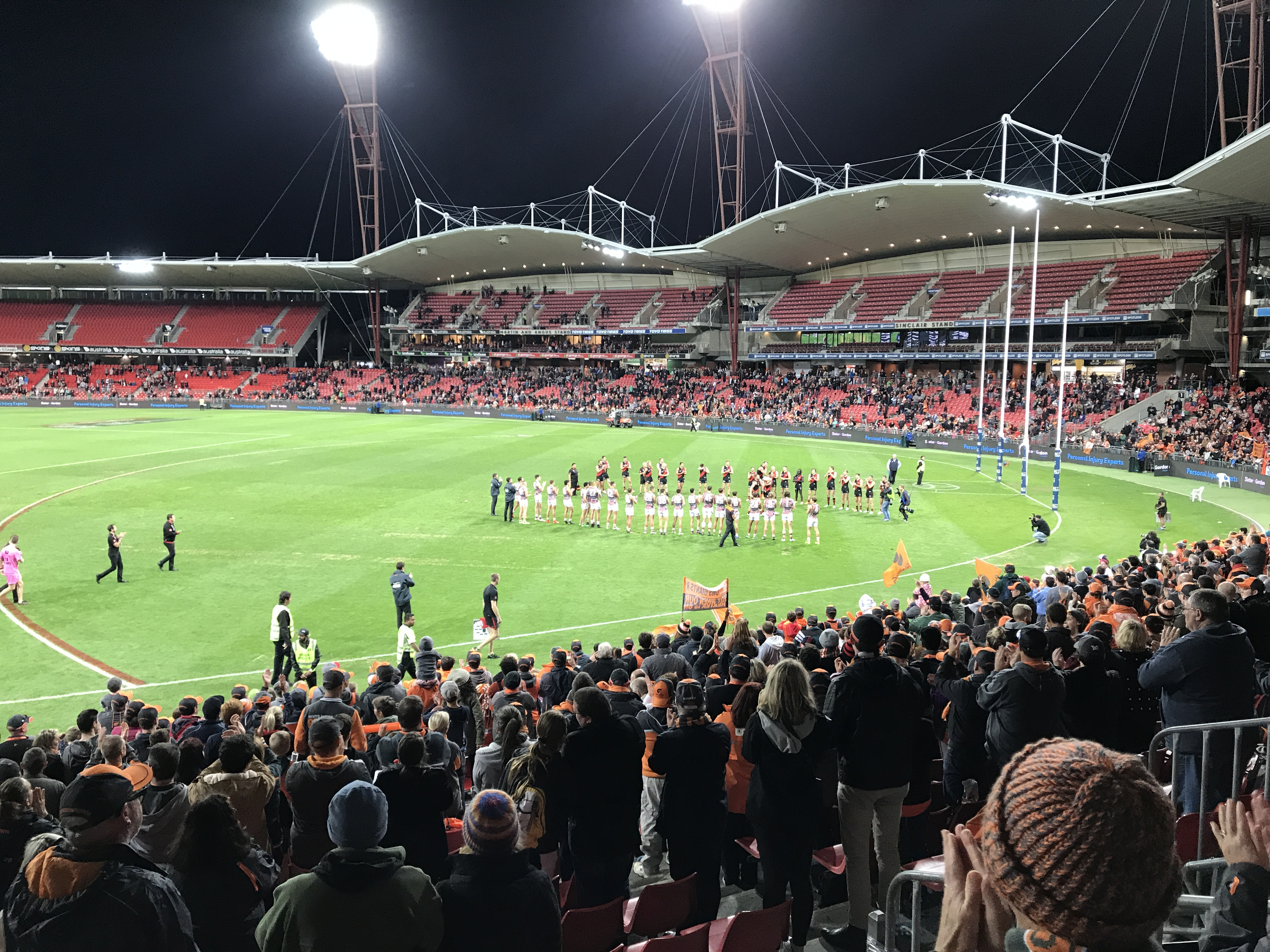
Sydney Showground Stadium

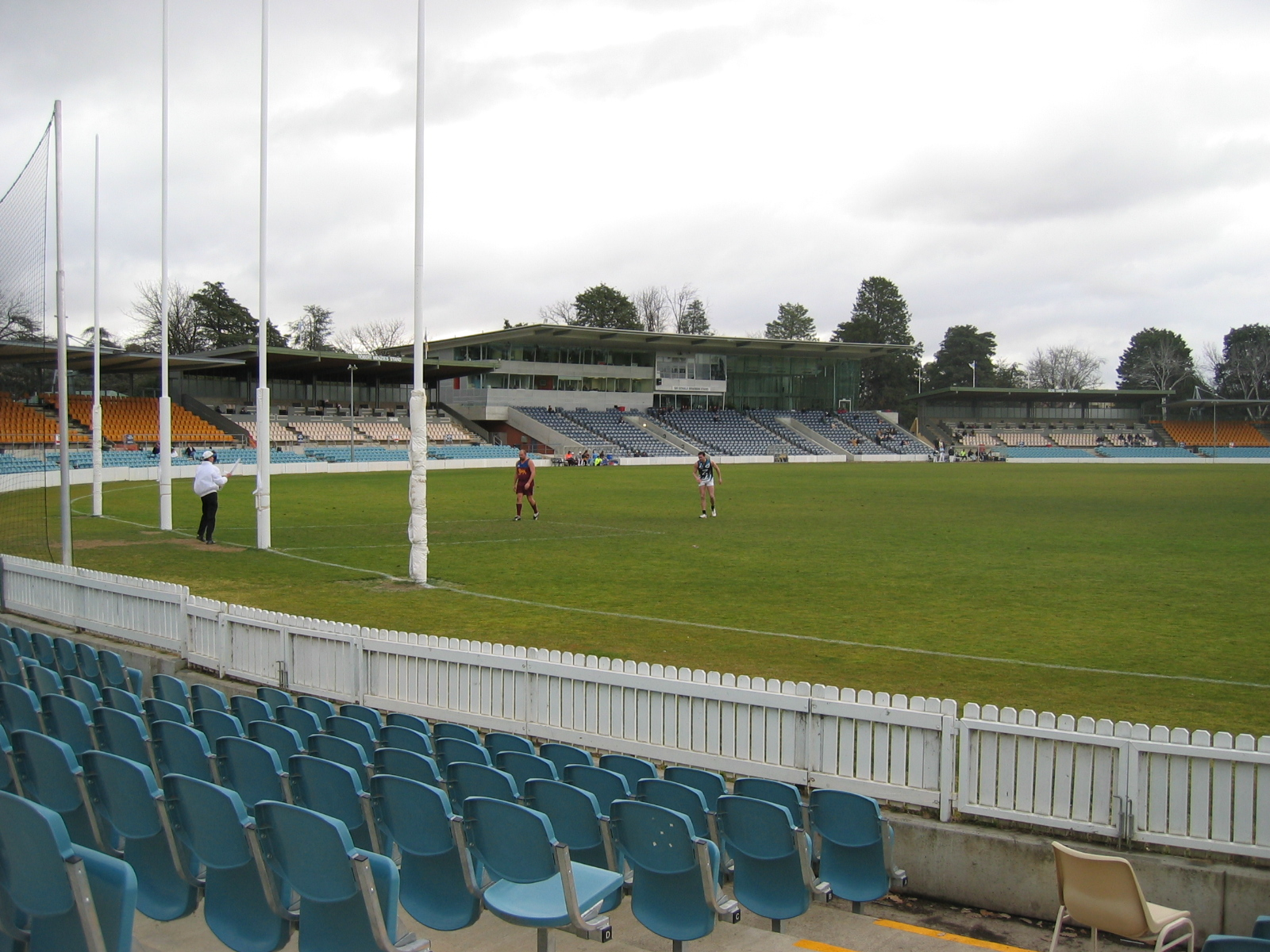
Manuka Oval

== Season summaries ==
P=Premiers, R=Runners-Up, M=Minor Premierships, F=Finals Appearance, W=Wooden Spoons (brackets represent finals games)
| Season | Games Played | Games Won | Games Drawn | Games Lost | Ladder Position | P | R | M | F | W | Coach | Captain(s) | Best & Fairest | Leading goalkicker(s) |
|---|---|---|---|---|---|---|---|---|---|---|---|---|---|---|
| 2012 | 22 | 2 | 0 | 20 | 18 / 18 | | | | | ✔ | Kevin Sheedy | Callan Ward, Phil Davis, & Luke Power | Callan Ward | Jeremy Cameron (29) |
| 2013 | 22 | 1 | 0 | 21 | 18 / 18 | | | | | ✔ | Kevin Sheedy | Callan Ward & Phil Davis | Jeremy Cameron | Jeremy Cameron (62) |
| 2014 | 22 | 6 | 0 | 16 | 16 / 18 | | | | | | Leon Cameron | Callan Ward & Phil Davis | Shane Mumford | Jeremy Cameron (29) |
| 2015 | 22 | 11 | 0 | 11 | 11 / 18 | | | | | | Leon Cameron | Callan Ward & Phil Davis | Heath Shaw | Jeremy Cameron (63) |
| 2016 | 22 (2) | 16 (1) | 0 | 6 (1) | 4 / 18 | | | | ✔ | | Leon Cameron | Callan Ward & Phil Davis | Toby Greene | Jeremy Cameron (53) |
| 2017 | 22 (3) | 14 (1) | 2 | 6 (2) | 4 / 18 | | | | ✔ | | Leon Cameron | Callan Ward & Phil Davis | Josh Kelly | Jeremy Cameron (45); Jonathon Patton (45); Toby Greene (45) |
| 2018 | 22 (2) | 13 (1) | 1 | 8 (1) | 7 / 18 | | | | ✔ | | Leon Cameron | Callan Ward & Phil Davis | Lachie Whitfield | Jeremy Cameron (46) |
| 2019 | 22 (4) | 13 (3) | 0 | 9 (1) | 6 / 18 | | ✔ | | ✔ | | Leon Cameron | Callan Ward & Phil Davis | Tim Taranto | Jeremy Cameron (76) |
| 2020 | 17 | 8 | 0 | 9 | 10 / 18 | | | | | | Leon Cameron | Stephen Coniglio | Lachie Whitfield and Nick Haynes | Jeremy Cameron (24) |
| 2021 | 22 (2) | 11 (1) | 1 | 10 (1) | 7 / 18 | | | | ✔ | | Leon Cameron | Stephen Coniglio | Josh Kelly | Toby Greene (42) |
| 2022 | 22 | 6 | 0 | 16 | 16 / 18 | | | | | | Leon Cameron/Mark McVeigh (caretaker) | Stephen Coniglio, Toby Greene, & Josh Kelly | Sam Taylor | Toby Greene (37) |
| 2023 | 23 (3) | 13 (2) | 0 | 10 (1) | 7 / 18 | | | | ✔ | | Adam Kingsley | Toby Greene | Toby Greene | Toby Greene (66) |
| 2024 | 23 (2) | 15 | 0 | 8 (2) | 4 / 18 | | | | ✔ | | Adam Kingsley | Toby Greene | Jesse Hogan | Jesse Hogan (77) |
| 2025 | 23 (1) | 16 | 0 | 7 (1) | 5 / 18 | | | | ✔ | | Adam Kingsley | Toby Greene | Tom Green | Jesse Hogan (46) |
| 2026 | 23 | 10 | 0 | 13 | 12 / 18 | | | | | | Adam Kingsley | Toby Greene | Lachie Ash | Jake Stringer (48) |

== Head-to-head results ==
Played: 348 Won 164 Drawn: 4 Lost: 180 (Last updated – Round 24 2026)

| R | Team | GP | W | D | L | GF.BF | For | GA.BA | Agn | % | Win% |
|---|---|---|---|---|---|---|---|---|---|---|---|
| 1 | Adelaide | 20 | 7 | 0 | 13 | 223.219 | 1557 | 291.271 | 2017 | 77.19 | 35.00 |
| 2 | Brisbane Lions | 20 | 11 | 0 | 9 | 285.193 | 1903 | 258.252 | 1800 | 105.72 | 55.00 |
| 3 | Carlton | 20 | 12 | 0 | 8 | 275.226 | 1876 | 230.218 | 1598 | 117.40 | 60.00 |
| 4 | Collingwood | 18 | 8 | 0 | 10 | 208.160 | 1408 | 228.216 | 1584 | 88.89 | 44.44 |
| 5 | Essendon | 20 | 11 | 0 | 9 | 254.221 | 1745 | 229.226 | 1600 | 109.06 | 55.00 |
| 6 | Fremantle | 17 | 8 | 0 | 9 | 191.191 | 1337 | 217.192 | 1494 | 89.49 | 47.06 |
| 7 | Geelong | 19 | 9 | 1 | 9 | 214.172 | 1456 | 245.225 | 1695 | 85.90 | 50.00 |
| 8 | Gold Coast | 23 | 16 | 0 | 7 | 340.269 | 2309 | 251.250 | 1756 | 131.49 | 69.57 |
| 9 | Hawthorn | 20 | 9 | 1 | 10 | 237.186 | 1608 | 265.232 | 1822 | 88.25 | 47.50 |
| 10 | Melbourne | 20 | 11 | 0 | 9 | 237.189 | 1611 | 235.220 | 1630 | 98.83 | 55.00 |
| 11 | North Melbourne | 16 | 8 | 1 | 7 | 196.198 | 1374 | 229.158 | 1532 | 89.69 | 53.13 |
| 12 | Port Adelaide | 18 | 9 | 0 | 9 | 201.218 | 1424 | 218.219 | 1527 | 93.25 | 50.00 |
| 13 | Richmond | 21 | 9 | 0 | 12 | 237.210 | 1632 | 264.271 | 1855 | 87.98 | 42.86 |
| 14 | St Kilda | 19 | 9 | 1 | 10 | 237.229 | 1563 | 256.222 | 1662 | 84.48 | 50.00 |
| 15 | Sydney | 33 | 11 | 0 | 22 | 351.381 | 2487 | 451.374 | 3080 | 80.75 | 33.33 |
| 16 | West Coast | 20 | 9 | 0 | 11 | 248.228 | 1716 | 268.201 | 1809 | 94.86 | 45.00 |
| 17 | Western Bulldogs | 23 | 7 | 0 | 16 | 259.220 | 1774 | 302.289 | 2101 | 84.44 | 30.43 |

== Current squad ==
The inaugural co-captains of the club were Phil Davis, Luke Power and Callan Ward. Both Davis and Ward were retained as captains in 2013, whilst Tom Scully was added to the leadership group as a vice-captain. Josh Kelly and Stephen Coniglio were named as vice-captains for the 2019 season. In 2020, Stephen Coniglio stepped into the captain role, becoming the first standalone captain since their inaugural season. For 2022, Stephen Coniglio, Josh Kelly, and Toby Greene were named co-captains. In 2023, Toby Greene was named as the club's standalone captain by new head coach Adam Kingsley. Josh Kelly and Stephen Coniglio were named as co-vice-captains.

Greater Western Sydney Giants · AFL personnel
| Playing list | | Inactive list | Coaching staff |
|---|---|---|---|
| 1 Harvey Thomas; 2 Darcy Jones; 3 Stephen Coniglio; 5 Aaron Cadman; 7 Lachie Ash; 9 Ryan Angwin; 10 Clayton Oliver; 11 Phoenix Gothard; 12 Tom Green (vc); 13 Oliver Hannaford; 14 Toby Bedford; 15 Sam Taylor; 16 Brent Daniels; 17 Finn Callaghan; 19 Harrison Oliver; 21 Leek Aleer; 22 Josh Kelly; 24 Harry Rowston; 25 Jayden Laverde (A) | 26 Jake Riccardi; 27 Harry Himmelberg; 28 Jack Ough; 29 Cody Angove; 30 James Leake; 31 Toby McMullin; 33 Xavier O'Halloran; 34 Oskar Taylor; 35 Max Gruzewski; 36 Logan Smith; 37 Joe Fonti; 38 Josaia Delana (B); 39 Connor Idun (vc); 41 Nick Madden; 42 Nathan Wardius (A); 43 Riley Hamilton (B); 44 Jack Buckley (vc); 45 Finnegan Davis; 46 Callum Brown; Alex Mirkov (A); Ethan Matthews | | Senior coach: Adam Kingsley; Assistant coaches: Robbie Chancellor (back line); Wayne Cripps (midfield/stoppage); Jason Davenport (midfield transition); Adam Read (forward line); Ryan Burton (development); David Hille (part-time ruck coach); Legend: (c) captain; (vc) vice-captain; (A) Category A rookie; (B) Category B rookie; Updated: 18 November 2026; Sources: Players (rookies); coaches |

== Honours ==
Premierships
| Competition | Level | Wins | Years won |
| Australian Football League | Seniors | 0 | Nil |
| North East Australian Football League (2012–2019) | Reserves | 1 | 2016 |
| Victorian Football League (2021–present) | Reserves | 0 | Nil |
Finishing positions
| Australian Football League | Minor premiership (McClelland Trophy) | 0 | Nil |
| Australian Football League | Grand Finalist | 1 | 2019 |
| Australian Football League | Wooden spoons | 2 | 2012, 2013 |

== Club awards and Statistical leaders ==
=== Best and Fairest ===
- Further Information: Kevin Sheedy Medal

=== Coaches Award ===
- 2012 – Jacob Townsend
- 2013 – Tom Scully
- 2014 – Devon Smith
- 2015 – Heath Shaw
- 2016 – Josh Kelly
- 2017 – Dawson Simpson
- 2018 – Stephen Coniglio
- 2019 – Matt de Boer
- 2020 – Nick Haynes
- 2021 – Sam Taylor
- 2022 – Harry Perryman
- 2023 – Jack Buckley
- 2024 – Toby Bedford
- 2025 – Connor Idun
- 2026 - Harvey Thomas

=== Members Choice Award ===
- 2012 – Toby Greene
- 2013 – Jeremy Cameron
- 2014 – Adam Treloar
- 2015 – Heath Shaw
- 2016 – Stephen Coniglio
- 2017 – Josh Kelly
- 2018 – Lachie Whitfield
- 2019 – Nick Haynes
- 2020 – Nick Haynes (2)
- 2021 – Toby Greene (2)
- 2022 – Tom Green
- 2023 – Toby Greene (3)
- 2024 – Jesse Hogan
- 2025 – Finn Callaghan
- 2026 - Clayton Oliver

=== Club Rising Star ===
- 2012 – Toby Greene
- 2013 – Lachie Whitfield
- 2014 – Josh Kelly
- 2015 – Cam McCarthy
- 2016 – Jacob Hopper
- 2017 – Tim Taranto
- 2018 – Zac Langdon
- 2019 – Brent Daniels
- 2020 – Lachie Ash
- 2021 – Tom Green
- 2022 – Jacob Wehr
- 2023 – Finn Callaghan
- 2024 – Darcy Jones
- 2025 – Aaron Cadman
- 2026 - Harvey Thomas

=== Community Award ===
- 2012 – Setanta Ó hAilpín
- 2013 – Jonathan Giles
- 2014 – Stephen Coniglio
- 2015 – Dylan Shiel
- 2016 – N/A
- 2017 – Tom Downie
- 2018 – Adam Tomlinson
- 2019 – Stephen Coniglio (2)
- 2020 – N/A
- 2021 – N/A
- 2022 – N/A
- 2023 – Kieren Briggs
- 2024 – Callan Ward
- 2025 – Toby Bedford
- 2026 – Stephen Coniglio (3)

=== Giants Academy Player of the Year ===
- 2012 – Nick Coughlan
- 2013 – Jock Cornell
- 2014 – Jack Steele
- 2015 – Jacob Hopper
- 2016 – Harry Perryman
- 2017 – Nick Shipley
- 2018 – Kieren Briggs
- 2019 – Tom Green
- 2020 – N/A
- 2021 – N/A
- 2022 – Harry Rowston
- 2023 – Harvey Thomas
- 2024 – Logan Smith
- 2025 – Riley Hamilton
- 2026 – Ethan Matthews

=== Development Award / VFL Player of the Year ===
- 2013 – Mark Whiley
- 2014 – James Stewart
- 2015 – Jake Barrett
- 2016 – Jeremy Finlayson
- 2017 – Isaac Cumming
- 2018 – Jake Stein
- 2019 – Connor Idun
- 2020 – Jack Buckley
- 2021 – James Peatling
- 2022 – Jarrod Brander
- 2023 – Cameron Fleeton
- 2024 – Conor Stone
- 2025 – Max Gruzewski
- 2026 – Harvey Hooper

=== Club Goal of the Year ===
- 2012 – Dom Tyson
- 2013 – Jeremy Cameron
- 2014 – Dylan Shiel
- 2015 – Jeremy Cameron (2)
- 2016 – Steve Johnson
- 2017 – Stephen Coniglio
- 2018 – Josh Kelly
- 2019 – Jeremy Finlayson
- 2020 – Brent Daniels
- 2021 – Toby Greene
- 2022 – Josh Kelly (2)
- 2023 – Toby Greene (2)
- 2024 – Toby Greene (3)
- 2025 – Finn Callaghan
- 2026 – Jake Stringer

=== Club Mark of the Year ===
- 2012 – Jeremy Cameron
- 2013 – N/A
- 2014 – Will Hoskin-Elliott
- 2015 – Nick Haynes
- 2016 – Rory Lobb
- 2017 – Toby Greene
- 2018 – Harry Himmelberg
- 2019 – Harry Himmelberg (2)
- 2020 – Bobby Hill
- 2021 – Toby Greene (2)
- 2022 – Toby Greene (3)
- 2023 – Harry Himmelberg (3)
- 2024 – Leek Aleer
- 2025 – Aaron Cadman
- 2026 – Aaron Cadman (2)

=== Leading Disposal Getter ===
- 2012 - Toby Greene (539)
- 2013 - Callan Ward (489)
- 2014 - Adam Treloar (552)
- 2015 - Adam Treloar (578) (2)
- 2016 - Stephen Coniglio (644)
- 2017 - Josh Kelly (708)
- 2018 - Stephen Coniglio (643) (2)
- 2019 - Tim Taranto (721)
- 2020 - Lachie Whitfield (390)
- 2021 - Tim Taranto (637) (2)
- 2022 - Josh Kelly (560) (2)
- 2023 - Stephen Coniglio (652) (3)
- 2024 - Tom Green (770)
- 2025 – Tom Green (684) (2)
- 2026 – Clayton Oliver (695)

=== Best Finals Player ===
- 2023 - Tom Green, Connor Idun, Lachie Whitfield
- 2024 – Tom Green (2), Jesse Hogan, Jack Buckley

=== Club Standard Award ===
- 2013 – Devon Smith
- 2014 – Shane Mumford
- 2015 – Devon Smith (2)
- 2016 – Shane Mumford (2)
- 2017 – Shane Mumford (3)
- 2018 – Tim Taranto
- 2019 – Tim Taranto (2)

=== Life Memberships ===
Life memberships are awarded to players or coaches who play or coach 150 games or people who make a significant contribution to the club over a long period.

- Kevin Sheedy (2015)
- Callan Ward (2018)
- Jeremy Cameron (2019)
- Phil Davis (2020)
- Toby Greene (2020)
- Leon Cameron (2020)
- Heath Shaw (2020)
- Lachie Whitfield (2020)
- Christine Cawsey (2021)
- Peter Taylor (2021)
- Stephen Coniglio (2021)
- Nick Haynes (2021)
- Josh Kelly (2021)
- Alan McConnell (2022)
- Andrew Stevens (2022)
- Alicia Eva (2022)
- Cora Staunton (2022)
- Michael Costello (2023)
- Adam Kennedy 2023
- Andrew Demetriou (2023)
- Dale Holmes (2023)
- Deb Keen (2024)
- Rebecca Beeson (2026)
- Shane Mumford (2026)

== AFL awards ==
=== All-Australian team ===
- Jeremy Cameron: 2013, 2019
- Heath Shaw: 2015, 2016
- Toby Greene: 2016, 2021, 2023 (c)
- Josh Kelly: 2017
- Dylan Shiel: 2017
- Lachie Whitfield: 2018, 2024
- Nick Haynes: 2020
- Sam Taylor: 2022, 2025
- Jesse Hogan: 2024
- Lachie Ash: 2026

=== Coleman Medal ===
- 2019 – Jeremy Cameron (67 goals)
- 2024 – Jesse Hogan (69 goals)

=== AFLCA Best Young Player ===
- 2013 – Jeremy Cameron

=== Mark of the Year ===
- 2023 - Harry Himmelberg

== Match and ladder records ==
- Highest score: Greater Western Sydney 26.10 (166) v Brisbane 13.10 (88), Round 11, 2026, Sydney Showground Stadium
- Lowest score: Greater Western Sydney 3.7 (25) v Richmond 17. 12 (114), Grand Final 2019, Melbourne Cricket Ground & Greater Western Sydney 3.7 (25) v Sydney Swans 10.6 (66), Round 12, 2020, Optus Stadium
- Highest losing score: Greater Western Sydney 16.9 (105) v Western Bulldogs 19.11 (125), Round 14, 2022, Sydney Showground Stadium
- Lowest winning score: Greater Western Sydney 7.5 (47) v Melbourne 5.15 (45), Round 16, 2023, Traeger Park
- Greatest winning margin: 126 points – Greater Western Sydney 25.12 (162) v Essendon 5.6 (36), Round 23, 2023, Sydney Showground Stadium
- Greatest losing margin: 162 points – Greater Western Sydney 4.7 (31) v Hawthorn 28.25 (193), Round 15, 2012, Melbourne Cricket Ground
- Longest winning Streak: 7 games – Round 13, 2023 – Round 20, 2023
- Longest losing Streak: 21 games – Round 20, 2012 – Round 18, 2013
- Highest home attendance: 38,203 – Round 1, 2012 at Stadium Australia v Sydney Swans
- Lowest home attendance: 4,014 – Round 3, 2022 at Sydney Showground v Gold Coast Suns

=== Club Records set by players ===
- Most Games: Toby Greene – 282 (2012–2026)
- Most Games Coached: Leon Cameron – 193 (2014–2022)
- Most Best & Fairest Awards: Josh Kelly, Lachie Whitfield, and Toby Greene – 2 (2017, 2021), (2018, 2020), (2016, 2023)
- Most Goals Kicked In A Game: Jeremy Cameron & Jesse Hogan – 9 (Round 23, 2019 (Cameron), Round 23, 2023 & Round 4, 2026 (Hogan))
- Most Goals In A Season: Jesse Hogan – 77 (2024)
- Most Career Goals: Toby Greene – 450 (2012–2026)
- Most Disposals In A Game: Josh Kelly – 43 (Round 22, 2017)
- Most Disposals In A Season: Tom Green – 770 (2024)
- Most Career Disposals: Lachie Whitfield – 6,906 (2013–)

=== AFL finishing positions (2012–present) ===
| Finishing Position | Year (Finals in Bold) | Tally |
|---|---|---|
| **Premiers** | nil | 0 |
| **Runner Up** | **2019** | 1 |
| 3rd | nil | 0 |
| 4th | **2016**, **2017**, **2024** | 3 |
| 5th | **2025** | 1 |
| 6th | **2019**, **2021** | 2 |
| 7th | **2018**, **2023** | 2 |
| 8th | nil | 0 |
| 9th | nil | 0 |
| 10th | 2020 | 1 |
| 11th | 2015 | 1 |
| 12th | 2026 | 1 |
| 13th | nil | 0 |
| 14th | nil | 0 |
| 15th | nil | 0 |
| 16th | 2014, 2022 | 2 |
| 17th | nil | 0 |
| 18th | 2012, 2013 | 2 |

== AFL Women's team ==
In April 2016, the Giants launched a bid to enter a team in the inaugural AFL Women's season in 2017. The club had previously partnered with the local Auburn Giants Football Club and run a female Academy program. They were announced as a founding club in June, receiving one of eight licences awarded at this time.

Former AFL NSW/ACT Female Football High Performance coach Tim Schmidt was announced as the team's inaugural head coach in July 2016. Days later the club announced its first two players, marquee signings Renee Forth and Emma Swanson. As a result of the NSW/ACT talent pool's size and depth, the Giants were granted five priority signings prior to the draft, the most of any club in the league. Prior to the draft, the club had recruited no NSW/ACT players, instead drawing three from Western Australia, three from Victoria and one more from South Australia.

In September the Giants won the first selection in the inaugural draft via lottery, and selected Sydney University player Nicola Barr.

The team was sponsored by Harvey Norman, FlexiGroup and Sydney Airport in its inaugural season.

In July 2017 it was announced Giants AFL director of coaching Alan McConnell would replace Tim Schmidt as coach of side. The 2018 Giants AFLW Captain is Amanda Farrugia and the vice-captain is Alicia Eva.

=== Season summaries ===
P=Premiers, R=Runners-up, M=Minor premierships, F=Finals appearance, W=Wooden spoons
| Season | Games Played | Games Won | Games Drawn | Games Lost | Ladder Position | P | R | M | F | W | Coach | Captain(s) | Best & Fairest | Leading goalkicker(s) |
|---|---|---|---|---|---|---|---|---|---|---|---|---|---|---|
| 2017 | 7 | 1 | 1 | 5 | 8 / 8 | | | | | ♦ | Tim Schmidt | Amanda Farrugia | Jess Dal Pos | Phoebe McWilliams (7) |
| 2018 | 7 | 3 | 1 | 3 | 4 / 8 | | | | | | Alan McConnell | Amanda Farrugia | Alicia Eva | Phoebe McWilliams (7) (2) |
| 2019 | 7 | 2 | 0 | 5 | 8 / 10 | | | | | | Alan McConnell | Amanda Farrugia | Rebecca Beeson | Christina Bernardi (7) |
| 2020 | 7 | 4 | 0 | 3 | 6 / 14 | | | | ♦ | | Alan McConnell | Alicia Eva | Alyce Parker | Cora Staunton (8) |
| 2021 | 9 | 4 | 0 | 5 | 9 / 14 | | | | | | Alan McConnell | Alicia Eva | Alyce Parker (2) | Cora Staunton (10) (2) |
| 2022 (S6) | 10 | 4 | 0 | 6 | 9 / 14 | | | | | | Alan McConnell | Alicia Eva | Alyce Parker (3) | Cora Staunton (18) (3) |
| 2022 (S7) | 10 | 4 | 0 | 6 | 11 / 18 | | | | | | Cameron Bernasconi | Alicia Eva | Alyce Parker (4) | Cora Staunton (8) (4) |
| 2023 | 10 | 2 | 0 | 8 | 16 / 18 | | | | | | Cameron Bernasconi | Alicia Eva | Zarlie Goldsworthy | Zarlie Goldsworthy (13) |
| 2024 | 11 | 1 | 1 | 9 | 16 / 18 | | | | | | Cameron Bernasconi | Rebecca Beeson | Rebecca Beeson (2) | Zarlie Goldsworthy (13) (2) |
| 2025 | 12 | 2 | 0 | 10 | 17 / 18 | | | | | | Cameron Bernasconi | Rebecca Beeson | Zarlie Goldsworthy (2) | Tarni Evans (13) |

=== Current squad ===
Greater Western Sydney Giants · AFL Women's personnel
| Playing list | | Inactive list | Coaching staff |
|---|---|---|---|
| 1 Grace Martin; 3 Alyce Parker; 4 Kiera Yerbury; 5 Jessica Doyle; 6 Rebecca Beeson (c); 7 Zarlie Goldsworthy; 8 Eleanor Brown; 9 Sara Howley; 10 Taylah Levy; 11 Caitlin Fletcher; 13 Mikayla Pauga; 14 Kaitlyn Srhoj; 15 Eilish O'Dowd; 17 Georgia Garnett | 18 Tarni Evans; 19 Sophia Gaukrodger; 20 Fleur Davies; 21 Poppy Boltz; 22 Tilly Lucas-Rodd; 23 Madison Brazendale; 25 Cambridge McCormick; 26 Maisy Evans; 27 Grace Kós*; 28 Daisy Walker; 29 Yasmeen Janschek; 30 Georgia Clark; 31 Brodie Mowbray; 33 Emily Pease | 16 Scarlett Johnson | Senior coach: Cam Bernasconi; Assistant coaches: Stephen Camp (back line); Emma Zielke (forward line); Darren Ratten (development); Rebecca Privitelli (development); Legend: (c) captain; * rookie; Updated: 18 November 2026; Sources: Players, coaches |

== Reserves team ==
Greater Western Sydney fielded a reserve team beneath the AFL team in the North East Australian Football League (NEAFL) competition between 2012 and 2019. The senior team participated in the 2011 NEAFL season, prior to it entering the AFL the following year. Following the dissolving of the NEAFL in 2020, the Giants reserves team entered the Victorian Football League (VFL) in 2021. GWS did not have a reserves captain until Ryan Hebron was appointed to the role prior to the start of the 2022 VFL season.

=== Seasons ===
| Premiers | Grand Finalist | Minor premiers | Finals appearance | Wildcard Round appearance | Wooden spoon | League leading goalkicker | League best and fairest |

| Year | League | Finish | W | L | D | Coach | Captain | Best and fairest | Leading goalkicker | Goals | Ref |
|---|---|---|---|---|---|---|---|---|---|---|---|
| 2012 | NEAFL E | 7th | 5 | 13 | 0 | Brett Hand | N/A | | | | |
| 2013 | NEAFL E | 5th | 9 | 9 | 0 | Brett Hand | N/A | Mark Whiley | | | |
| 2014 | NEAFL | 1st | 15 | 3 | 0 | Brett Hand | N/A | James Stewart | | | |
| 2015 | NEAFL | 1st | 16 | 2 | 0 | Brett Hand | N/A | Jake Barrett | | | |
| 2016 | NEAFL | 2nd | 12 | 6 | 0 | Brad Miller | N/A | Jeremy Finlayson | | | |
| 2017 | NEAFL | 10th | 2 | 16 | 0 | Brad Miller | N/A | Isaac Cumming | Zach Sproule | 28 | |
| 2018 | NEAFL | 7th | 8 | 9 | 1 | Adam Schneider | N/A | Jake Stein | Zach Sproule (2) | 31 | |
| 2019 | NEAFL | 6th | 9 | 9 | 0 | Adam Schneider | N/A | Connor Idun | Zach Sproule (3) | 29 | |
| 2020 | NEAFL | (No season) | | | | Jason Saddington | N/A | (No season) | | | |
| 2021 | VFL | 8th | 7 | 4 | 0 | Luke Kelly | N/A | James Peatling | Zach Sproule (4) | 16 | |
| 2022 | VFL | 13th | 8 | 9 | 1 | Damian Truslove | Ryan Hebron | Jarrod Brander | Ryan Hebron | 21 | |
| 2023 | VFL | 12th | 9 | 9 | 0 | Wayne Cripps | Ryan Hebron | Cameron Fleeton | Max Gruzewski | 26 | |
| 2024 | VFL | 14th | 8 | 10 | 0 | Wayne Cripps | Ryan Hebron | Conor Stone | Max Gruzewski (2) | 30 | |
| 2025 | VFL | 9th | 10 | 8 | 0 | Wayne Cripps | Ryan Hebron | Max Gruzewski | Max Gruzewski (3) | 30 | |
| 2026 | VFL | 11th | 10 | 8 | 0 | Robbie Chancellor | Ryan Hebron | Harvey Hooper | Ryan Hebron(2) | 31 | |

- Although GWS finished eighth in 2021, no finals series was held as the season was curtailed due to the COVID-19 pandemic

== Greater Western Sydney Giants Academy ==
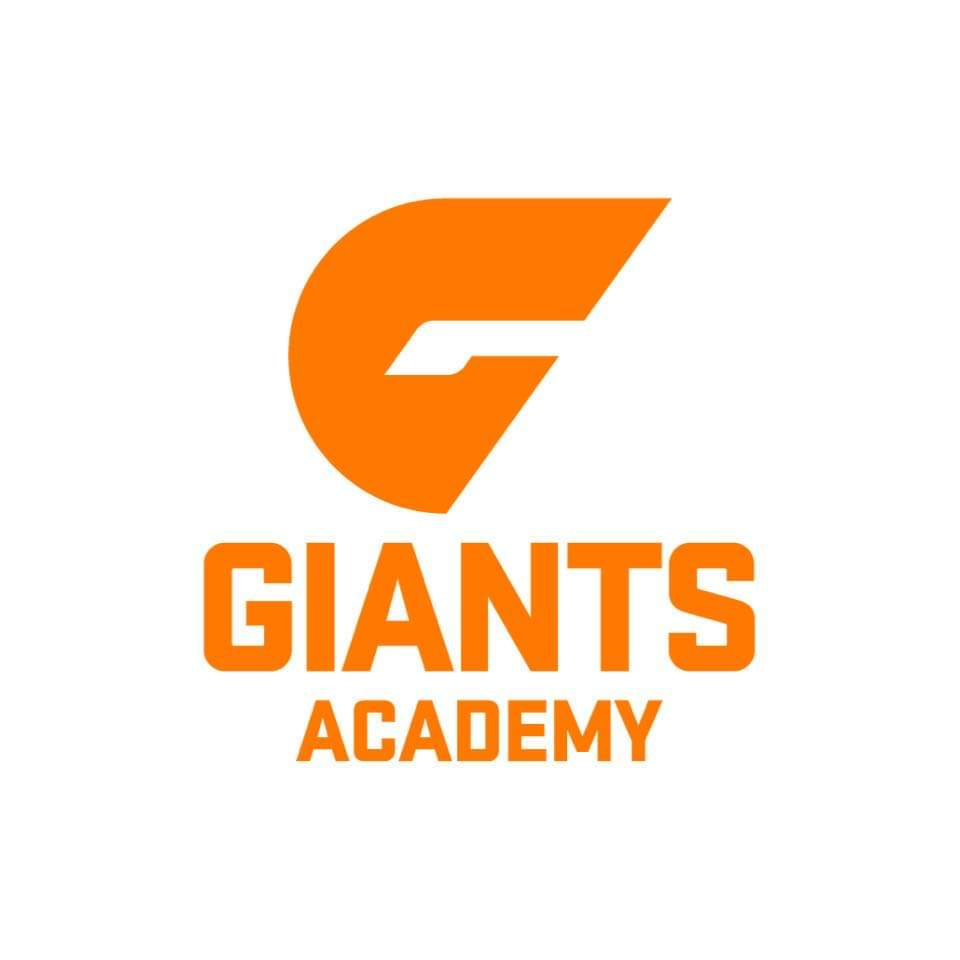
The Greater Western Sydney Giants Academy

The Greater Western Sydney Giants Academy (also known simply as the GWS Academy or Giants Academy) consists of the club's junior development signings. It was formed in 2010 as one of two in Sydney including the Sydney Swans Academy and one of four Northern Academies including the Brisbane Lions Academy and Gold Coast Suns Academy.

70 staff spread across 11 facilities manage 700 selected underage players from age 13 up with regional hubs in Blacktown, Canberra, Wagga Wagga, Albury and Broken Hill. The men's and women's U16 and U18 teams have contested Division 2 of the men's and women's underage championships since 2017. The Giants Academy also joined the Talent League in 2019.

== Activism ==
=== Same Sex Marriage ===
During the Australian Marriage Law Postal Survey, Greater Western Sydney Giants supported the Yes vote.

=== Voice to Parliament ===
Greater Western Sydney Giants was a supporter of the Voice to Parliament.
