= James Leake =

Australian rules footballer

Personal information
- Full name: James Leake
- Nicknames: Leakey, Mr. Fix It
- Born: 2 October 2005 (age 21); Launceston, Tasmania
- Original team: Launceston (TSL)/Tasmania Devils (Talent League)
- Draft: No. 17, 2023 national draft
- Debut: Opening Round, 2025, Greater Western Sydney vs. Collingwood, at ENGIE Stadium
- Height: 188 cm (6 ft 2 in)
- Position: Defender

Club information
- Current club: Greater Western Sydney
- Number: 30

Playing career^{1}
Years	Club	Games (Goals)
2024–	Greater Western Sydney	8 (1)
- ^{1} Playing statistics correct to the end of round 22, 2026.

James Leake (born 2 October 2005) is an Australian rules footballer who plays for the Greater Western Sydney Giants in the Australian Football League (AFL).

== Early life ==
Originally from Tasmania, Leake made a strong impression with the Tasmania Devils in the 2023 Coates Talent League. The year prior, at just 16, he claimed a premiership with Launceston in the Tasmanian State League. A standout junior in 2023, he was named an Under-18 All-Australian following the Allies’ championship win. His versatility was a highlight of the season, excelling in both forward and defensive roles. He was recognised as an All-Australian for his efforts in the Allies’ backline, before returning to the forward line for Tasmania, where he finished the season with 15 goals in his final five games.

== AFL career ==
=== 2024 ===
Leake’s 2024 campaign got off to a slow start due to injury, delaying his AFL debut. However, he bounced back strongly in the second half of the year with an impressive run of form in the VFL, reminding everyone why GWS were so excited to snap him up in the 2023 national draft

=== 2025 ===
Leake made his AFL debut in the Opening Round 2025 against Collingwood, following a standout pre-season and an eye-catching performance in the AAMI Community Series clash against Carlton. The well-built Tasmanian impressed with 18 disposals, four tackles, six clearances, and two contested marks, solidifying his case for early-season selection. The 19-year-old was informed of his debut by vice-captain Josh Kelly during a surprise meeting in coach Adam Kingsley’s office, much to the delight of Leake and his teammates.

== Statistics ==
Updated to the end of round 22, 2026.

Legend
G	Goals	K	Kicks	D	Disposals	T	Tackles
B	Behinds	H	Handballs	M	Marks

Season	Team	No.	Games	Totals							Averages (per game)							Votes
Season	Team	No.	Games	G	B	K	H	D	M	T	G	B	K	H	D	M	T	Votes
2025	Greater Western Sydney	30	3	1	1	13	11	24	5	3	0.3	0.3	4.3	3.7	8.0	1.7	1.0	0
2026	Greater Western Sydney	30	5	0	0	32	33	65	16	11	0.0	0.0	6.4	6.6	13.0	3.2	2.2	0
Career			8	1	1	45	44	89	21	14	0.1	0.1	5.6	5.5	11.1	2.6	1.8	0
