= Aaron Cadman =

Australian rules footballer (born 2004)

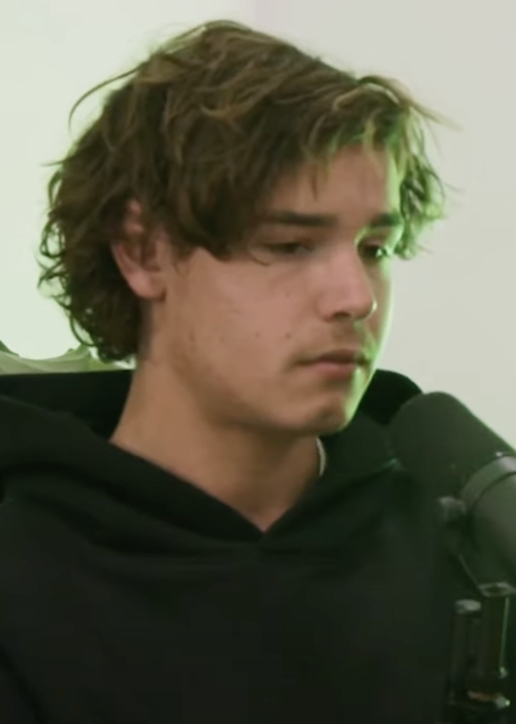
- Cadman in October 2022

Personal information
- Full name: Aaron Cadman
- Born: 3 March 2004 (age 22); Bacchus Marsh, Victoria
- Original teams: Darley (BFL), GWV Rebels (Talent League)
- Draft: No. 1, 2022 national draft
- Debut: Round 5, 2023, Greater Western Sydney vs. Hawthorn, at Norwood Oval
- Height: 195 cm (6 ft 5 in)
- Weight: 92 kg (203 lb)
- Position: Key Forward

Club information
- Current club: Greater Western Sydney
- Number: 5

Playing career^{1}
| Years | Club | Games (Goals) |
| 2023– | Greater Western Sydney | 76 (111) |
- ^{1} Playing statistics correct to the end of round 23, 2026.

Aaron Cadman (born 3 March 2004) is a professional Australian rules footballer who was selected in the 2022 draft to play for the Greater Western Sydney Giants in the Australian Football League (AFL).

== Early life ==
Aaron Cadman was a Darley junior before joining Greater Western Victoria Rebels. He was student at St Patrick's College, Ballarat. In his final year of junior football Cadman played for an AFL Academy side (full of potential draftees) against Collingwood's VFL side.

Cadman played his draft year (2022) football with GWV Rebels and Vic Country.

As a forward, he has been noted for his athleticism and drawn comparisons to Geelong forward Jeremy Cameron.

One of five siblings, prior to his AFL career he worked for his father's electrical business while balancing training commitments for his junior teams.

== AFL career ==
Cadman was highly rated by recruiters and deemed likely to be selected in the first 5 picks of the 2022 AFL Draft. He was selected by Greater Western Sydney using pick number 1. He made his debut in Round 5, 2023 against Hawthorn at Norwood Oval.

Cadman went on to play 12 games in his debut season. He played 23 games in 2024, and went on to kick 44 goals in the 2025 season. He signed a 4-year contract extension in 2025, committing to GWS until the end of 2030.

Cadman's start to the 2026 AFL season was delayed due to a pelvis issue in pre-season. He played his first game in Round 5 against Richmond, where he kicked four goals but was concussed by a knee to the head. Cadman would spearhead the Giants' forward line for most of the 2026 season in the absence of the oft-injured Jesse Hogan, and earned his second consecutive selection in the AFL's 22under22 team.

== Statistics ==
Updated to the end of round 22, 2026.

Legend
| G | Goals | K | Kicks | D | Disposals | T | Tackles |
| B | Behinds | H | Handballs | M | Marks | H/O | Hit-outs |

| Season | Team | No. | Games | Totals | | | | | | | | Averages (per game) | | | | | | | | Votes |
| Season | Team | No. | Games | G | B | K | H | D | M | T | H/O | G | B | K | H | D | M | T | H/O | Votes |
|---|---|---|---|---|---|---|---|---|---|---|---|---|---|---|---|---|---|---|---|---|
| 2023 | Greater Western Sydney | 5 | 12 | 6 | 4 | 35 | 19 | 54 | 19 | 19 | 0 | 0.5 | 0.3 | 2.9 | 1.6 | 4.5 | 1.6 | 1.6 | 0.0 | 0 |
| 2024 | Greater Western Sydney | 5 | 23 | 30 | 11 | 112 | 60 | 172 | 54 | 67 | 20 | 1.3 | 0.5 | 4.9 | 2.6 | 7.5 | 2.3 | 2.9 | 0.9 | 0 |
| 2025 | Greater Western Sydney | 5 | 24 | 44 | 23 | 173 | 61 | 234 | 113 | 41 | 0 | 1.8 | 1.0 | 7.2 | 2.5 | 9.8 | 4.7 | 1.7 | 0.0 | 6 |
| 2026 | Greater Western Sydney | 5 | 16 | 28 | 18 | 113 | 54 | 167 | 67 | 35 | 0 | 1.8 | 1.1 | 7.1 | 3.4 | 10.4 | 4.2 | 2.2 | 0.0 | 0 |
| Career | | | 75 | 108 | 56 | 433 | 194 | 627 | 253 | 162 | 20 | 1.4 | 0.7 | 5.8 | 2.6 | 8.4 | 3.4 | 2.2 | 0.3 | 6 |
