= Harrison Oliver =

Australian rules footballer (born 2006)

Personal information
- Born: 15 June 2006 (age 20)
- Original team: St Bedes/Mentone
- Draft: No. 19, 2024 national draft
- Height: 181 cm (5 ft 11 in)
- Position: Defender

Club information
- Current club: Greater Western Sydney
- Number: 19

Playing career
Years	Club	Games (Goals)
2026–	Greater Western Sydney	5 (1)

Harrison Oliver (born 15 June 2006) is an Australian rules footballer who plays for the Greater Western Sydney Giants in the Australian Football League (AFL).

Oliver was educated at Brighton Grammar School and played junior football for St Bedes/Mentone.

A left-footed defender, Oliver featured in three premiership-winning teams in 2024, for the Brighton Grammar first XVIII, the Sandringham Dragons and Vic Metro. He was named in the Talent League team of the year for his performances with Sandringham and gained All-Australian honours playing for Vic Metro at the AFL National Under-18s Championships.

Oliver was selected by the Giants with pick 19 of the 2024 national draft. After spending the 2025 season as a rebounding defender in the VFL, Oliver got his first opportunities to play in the AFL the following year, kicking a goal on debut against the West Coast Eagles. He finished the season with five appearances at AFL level.
