= List of AFL debuts in 2022 =

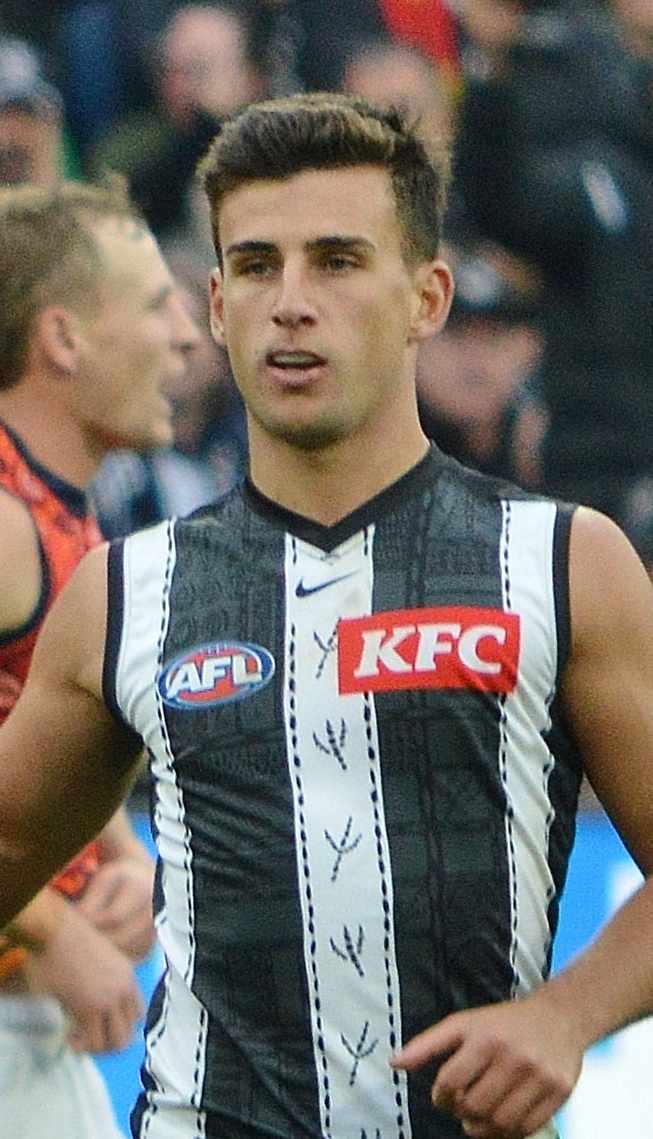
Collingwood's Nick Daicos made his debut in round one, 2022.

This is a list of players in the Australian Football League (AFL) who have either made their AFL debut or played for a new club during the 2022 AFL season.

== Summary ==
Summary of debuts in 2022
Club	AFL debuts	Change of club
Adelaide	3	1
Brisbane Lions	4	1
Carlton	3	5
Collingwood	6	2
Essendon	7	1
Fremantle	3	2
Geelong	4	2
Gold Coast	4	3
Greater Western Sydney	5	2
Hawthorn	8	1
Melbourne	1	1
North Melbourne	6	2
Port Adelaide	5	3
Richmond	5	1
St Kilda	4	2
Sydney	2	2
West Coast	10	6
Western Bulldogs	4	1
Total	84	38

== AFL debuts ==
Name	Club	Age at debut	Debut round	Notes
Josh Gibcus	Richmond	18 years, 347 days	1	Pick 9, 2021 national draft
Nick Daicos	Collingwood	19 years, 74 days	1	Pick 4, 2021 national draft, son of Peter Daicos
Mitch Owens	St Kilda	18 years, 175 days	1	Pick 33, 2021 national draft, Next Generation Academy selection
Jack Hayes	St Kilda	26 years, 12 days	1	2022 Pre-season supplemental selection
Nasiah Wanganeen-Milera	St Kilda	19 years, 24 days	1	Pick 11, 2021 national draft
Kaine Baldwin	Essendon	19 years, 293 days	1	2021 Pre-season supplemental selection
Nic Martin	Essendon	21 years, 15 days	1	2022 Pre-season supplemental selection
Angus Sheldrick	Sydney	18 years, 132 days	1	Pick 18, 2021 national draft
Jackson Mead	Port Adelaide	20 years, 170 days	1	Pick 25, 2019 national draft, son of Darren Mead
Connor MacDonald	Hawthorn	19 years, 66 days	1	Pick 26, 2021 national draft
Josh Ward	Hawthorn	18 years, 215 days	1	Pick 7, 2021 national draft
Jason Horne-Francis	North Melbourne	18 years, 272 days	1	Pick 1, 2021 national draft
Jake Soligo	Adelaide	19 years, 54 days	1	Pick 36, 2021 national draft
Josh Rachele	Adelaide	18 years, 343 days	1	Pick 6, 2021 national draft
Brady Hough	West Coast	19 years, 15 days	1	Pick 31, 2021 national draft
Tex Wanganeen	Essendon	18 years, 167 days	2	2022 Pre-season supplemental selection
Josh Sinn	Port Adelaide	19 years, 78 days	2	Pick 12, 2021 national draft
Callum Jamieson	West Coast	21 years, 239 days	2	Pick 49, 2019 national draft
Jack Williams	West Coast	18 years, 116 days	2	Pick 57, 2021 national draft
Aaron Black	West Coast	29 years, 92 days	2	2022 Covid top-up player
Nathan O'Driscoll	Fremantle	19 years, 314 days	2	Pick 27, 2020 national draft
Reef McInnes	Collingwood	19 years, 111 days	3	Pick 23, 2020 national draft
Jordan Boyd	Carlton	23 years, 193 days	3	Pick 20, 2021 mid-season rookie draft
Neil Erasmus	Fremantle	18 years, 122 days	3	Pick 10, 2021 national draft
Marcus Windhager	St Kilda	18 years, 329 days	4	Pick 47, 2021 national draft
Kai Lohmann	Brisbane Lions	18 years, 343 days	5	Pick 20, 2021 national draft
Finn Callaghan	Greater Western Sydney	18 years, 355 days	5	Pick 3, 2021 national draft
Sam Hayes	Port Adelaide	22 years, 312 days	5	Pick 47, 2017 national draft
Ben Hobbs	Essendon	18 years, 213 days	5	Pick 13, 2021 national draft
Robbie McComb	Western Bulldogs	26 years, 125 days	6	Pick 23, 2022 rookie draft
Luke Strnadica	West Coast	24 years, 112 days	6	2022 Pre-season supplemental selection
Oliver Dempsey	Geelong	19 years, 107 days	6	Pick 15, 2022 rookie draft
Paul Curtis	North Melbourne	19 years, 51 days	6	Pick 35, 2021 national draft
Greg Clark	West Coast	24 years, 340 days	7	2022 Pre-season supplemental selection
Cooper Hamilton	Greater Western Sydney	18 years, 218 days	7	Pick 13, 2022 rookie draft
Jackson Callow	Hawthorn	19 years, 323 days	7	Pick 17, 2021 mid-season rookie draft
Jack Carroll	Carlton	19 years, 131 days	7	Pick 41, 2020 national draft
Miller Bergman	North Melbourne	19 years, 95 days	7	Pick 38, 2021 national draft
Aiden Begg	Collingwood	19 years, 205 days	7	Pick 18, 2021 mid-season rookie draft
Jye Amiss	Fremantle	18 years, 279 days	8	Pick 8, 2021 national draft
Cooper Stephens	Geelong	21 years, 110 days	8	Pick 16, 2019 national draft
Mitch Knevitt	Geelong	19 years, 119 days	8	Pick 25, 2021 national draft
Alastair Lord	Essendon	18 years, 162 days	8	Pick 46, 2021 national draft
Jake Florenca	West Coast	24 years, 357 days	8	2022 Covid top-up player
Luke Cleary	Western Bulldogs	20 years, 69 days	9	Pick 61, 2021 national draft
Sam Butler	Hawthorn	19 years, 93 days	9	Pick 23, 2021 national draft
Bigoa Nyuon	Richmond	20 years, 361 days	9	Pick 54, 2019 national draft
Jesse Motlop	Carlton	18 years, 173 days	9	Pick 27, 2021 national draft
Jacob Wehr	Greater Western Sydney	23 years, 321 days	10	Pick 59, 2020 national draft
Noah Cumberland	Richmond	21 years, 73 days	11 (unused substitute)	Pick 43, 2019 national draft
Matt Roberts	Sydney	18 years, 300 days	11	Pick 34, 2021 national draft
Shannon Neale	Geelong	19 years, 307 days	11	Pick 33, 2020 national draft
Patrick Parnell	Adelaide	20 years, 92 days	12	Pick 4, 2021 mid-season rookie draft
Judson Clarke	Richmond	18 years, 235 days	13	Pick 30, 2021 national draft
Daniel Turner	Melbourne	20 years, 136 days	13	Pick 24, 2021 mid-season rookie draft
Massimo D'Ambrosio	Essendon	19 years, 12 days	14	Pick 3, 2022 mid-season rookie draft
Brynn Teakle	Port Adelaide	22 years, 245 days	14	Pick 8, 2022 mid-season rookie draft
Rhett Bazzo	West Coast	18 years, 244 days	14	Pick 37, 2021 national draft
Ryan Angwin	Greater Western Sydney	19 years, 188 days	14	Pick 18, 2020 national draft
James Tsitas	Gold Coast	27 years, 121 days	16	Rookie, 2022 Pre-season supplemental selection
Zane Trew	West Coast	20 years, 68 days	18	Pick 12, 2021 rookie draft
Jai Culley	West Coast	19 years, 143 days	18	Pick 1, 2022 rookie draft
Elijah Hollands	Gold Coast	20 years, 89 days	19	
Leek Aleer	Greater Western Sydney	20 years, 343 days	20	
Mac Andrew	Gold Coast	18 years, 239 days	20	
Jye Menzie	Essendon	19 years, 276 days	20	
Kallan Dawson	North Melbourne	24 years, 9 days	20	
Jai Serong	Hawthorn	19 years, 171 days	21	
Sam Darcy	Western Bulldogs	19 years, 18 days	21	
Josh Goater	North Melbourne	19 years, 79 days	23	
Ned Long	Hawthorn	19 years, 197 days	23	
Jack Saunders	Hawthorn	20 years, 191 days	23	
Darcy Wilmot	Brisbane Lions	18 years, 244 days	EF	

== Change of AFL club ==
Name	Club	Age at debut	Debut round	Former clubs	Recruiting method
Robbie Tarrant	Richmond	32 years, 326 days	1	North Melbourne	2021 trade
George Hewett	Carlton	26 years, 78 days	1	Sydney	2021 free agent
Adam Cerra	Carlton	22 years, 161 days	1	Fremantle	2021 trade
Patrick Lipinski	Collingwood	23 years, 244 days	1	Western Bulldogs	2021 trade
Jake Kelly	Essendon	27 years, 57 days	1	Adelaide	2021 free agent
Tyson Stengle	Geelong	23 years, 151 days	1	Richmond & Adelaide	2021 free agent
Paddy McCartin	Sydney	25 years, 334 days	1	St Kilda	2022 Pre-season supplemental selection
Jarrod Brander	Greater Western Sydney	23 years, 36 days	1	West Coast	2021 free agent
Jeremy Finlayson	Port Adelaide	26 years, 38 days	1	Greater Western Sydney	2021 trade
Darcy Fort	Brisbane Lions	28 years, 225 days	1	Geelong	2021 trade
Hugh Greenwood	North Melbourne	30 years, 14 days	1	Adelaide & Gold Coast	2021 free agent
Callum Coleman-Jones	North Melbourne	22 years, 280 days	1	Richmond	2021 trade
Max Lynch	Hawthorn	23 years, 189 days	1	Collingwood	2021 trade
Jordan Dawson	Adelaide	24 years, 345 days	1	Sydney	2021 trade
Will Brodie	Fremantle	23 years, 209 days	1	Gold Coast	2021 trade
Jordan Clark	Fremantle	21 years, 155 days	1	Geelong	2021 trade
Levi Casboult	Gold Coast	32 years, 5 days	1	Carlton	Pick 3, 2022 rookie draft
Mabior Chol	Gold Coast	25 years, 50 days	1	Richmond	2021 free agent
Sam Petrevski-Seton	West Coast	24 years, 29 days	1	Carlton	2021 trade
Patrick Naish	West Coast	23 years, 64 days	1	Richmond	2022 Pre-season supplemental selection
Hugh Dixon	West Coast	23 years, 22 days	1	Fremantle	2022 Pre-season supplemental selection
Nathan Kreuger	Collingwood	22 years, 274 days	2	Geelong	2021 trade
Sam Skinner	Port Adelaide	24 years, 270 days	2	Brisbane Lions	2021 free agent
Angus Dewar	West Coast	29 years, 166 days	2	Hawthorn	2022 Covid top-up player
Declan Mountford	West Coast	25 years, 42 days	2	North Melbourne	2022 Covid top-up player
Stefan Giro	West Coast	23 years, 17 days	2	Fremantle	2022 Covid top-up player
Jarrod Lienert	St Kilda	27 years, 234 days	2	Port Adelaide	2022 Pre-season supplemental selection
Braydon Preuss	Greater Western Sydney	26 years, 290 days	3	North Melbourne & Melbourne	2020 trade
Lewis Young	Carlton	23 years, 104 days	3	Western Bulldogs	2021 trade
Trent Dumont	Port Adelaide	26 years, 281 days	4	North Melbourne	Pick 16, 2022 rookie draft
Peter Ladhams	Sydney	24 years, 85 days	4	Port Adelaide	2021 trade
Tim O'Brien	Western Bulldogs	28 years, 12 days	4	Hawthorn	2021 free agent
Luke Dunstan	Melbourne	27 years, 85 days	6	St Kilda	2021 free agent
Tom Campbell	St Kilda	30 years, 179 days	7	Western Bulldogs & North Melbourne	2021 free agent
Charlie Constable	Gold Coast	23 years, 10 days	11 (unused substitute)	Geelong	Pick 63, 2021 national draft
Sam Durdin	Carlton	26 years, 10 days	14	North Melbourne	Pick 13, 2022 mid-season rookie draft
Will Hayes	Carlton	27y 35d	17	Western Bulldogs	Pick 22, 2022 mid-season rookie draft
Jonathon Ceglar	Geelong	31y 166d	20	Hawthorn	2021 trade

== See also ==
- List of AFL Women's debuts in 2022 season 6
- List of AFL Women's debuts in 2022 season 7
