= Woewodin =

Woewodin is a surname. Notable people with the surname include:

- Shane Woewodin (born 1976), Australian rules footballer
- Taj Woewodin (born 2003), Australian rules footballer
