= 2021 AFL draft =

Draft for the Australian Football League

General information
- Dates: 2 June: Mid-season Draft; 24–25 November: National Draft; 26 November: Rookie Draft
- Location: Marvel Stadium
- Network: Fox Footy
- Sponsored by: National Australia Bank

Overview
- League: AFL
- First selection: Jason Horne-Francis (North Melbourne)

The 2021 AFL draft consisted of the various periods where the 18 clubs in the Australian Football League (AFL) could trade and recruit players during and following the completion of the 2021 AFL season.

The National Draft returned to being a two day event in 2021, after being held on a single night in 2020.

After coming 18th in the 2021 AFL season, the North Melbourne Football Club held the number one draft pick in the National draft for the first time, selecting South Adelaide midfielder Jason Horne-Francis.

== Key dates ==
Table of key dates
Event	Date(s)
Mid-season rookie draft	2 June 2021
Free agency period	Restricted and Unrestricted: 1–8 October 2021; Delisted: 3–15 November 2021
Trade period	4–13 October 2021
National draft	First round: 24 November 2021; Second and subsequent rounds: 25 November 2021
Pre-Season and Rookie draft	26 November 2021
Pre-season supplemental selection period	10 January 2022 - 9 March 2022

== 2021 mid-season rookie draft ==
The mid-season draft was held after the conclusion of Round 11 of the 2021 AFL season on 2 June. The draft was only open to clubs with inactive players on their list and vacancies available, such as long term injuries or retirements.

Mid-season draft selections
Round	Pick	Player	Club	Recruited from		Pick due to
Round	Pick	Player	Club	Club	League	Pick due to
1	1	Jacob Edwards	North Melbourne	Sandringham Dragons	NAB League	Flynn Perez long-term injury
1	2	Jai Newcombe	Hawthorn	Box Hill Hawks	VFL	Jonathon Patton retirement
1	3	Ash Johnson	Collingwood	Sturt	SANFL	Passed selection at the 2020 Rookie Draft
1	4	Patrick Parnell	Adelaide	Murray Bushrangers	NAB League	Tyson Stengle delisting
1	5	Ned Moyle	Gold Coast	Oakleigh Chargers	NAB League	Jarrod Witts long-term injury
1	6	Alex Mirkov	Carlton	Carlton	VFL	Caleb Marchbank long-term injury
1	7	Max Heath	St Kilda	Sandringham Dragons	NAB League	Dylan Roberton retirement
1	8	James Peatling	Greater Western Sydney	Greater Western Sydney	VFL	Lachlan Keeffe long-term injury
1	9	Sam Durham	Essendon	Richmond	VFL	Irving Mosquito long-term injury
1	10	Matthew Parker	Richmond	South Fremantle	WAFL	Ivan Soldo long-term injury
1	11	William Collins	West Coast	Swan Districts	WAFL	Daniel Venables long-term injury
1	12	Lachlan McAndrew	Sydney	Sydney	VFL	Passed selection at the 2020 Rookie Draft
1	13	Jed McEntee	Port Adelaide	Sturt	SANFL	Passed selection at the 2020 Rookie Draft
1	14	Kalin Lane	Brisbane Lions	Claremont	WAFL	Cam Rayner long-term injury
1	15	Kye Declase	Melbourne	Werribee	VFL	Aaron Nietschke long-term injury
2	16	Charlie Ham	North Melbourne	Geelong Falcons	NAB League	Passed selection at the 2020 Rookie Draft
2	17	Jackson Callow	Hawthorn	Norwood	SANFL	James Sicily long-term injury
2	18	Aiden Begg	Collingwood	Eastern Ranges	NAB League	Passed selection at the 2020 Rookie Draft
2	19	Passed	Gold Coast	—	—	Rory Thompson long-term injury
2	20	Jordan Boyd	Carlton	Footscray	VFL	David Cuningham long-term injury
2	21	Cooper Sharman	St Kilda	Woodville-West Torrens	SANFL	Jade Gresham long-term injury
2	22	Passed	Essendon	—	—	Michael Hurley long-term injury
2	23	Connor West	West Coast	West Perth	WAFL	Jarrod Cameron long-term injury
2	24	Daniel Turner	Melbourne	Murray Bushrangers	NAB League	Marty Hore long-term injury
3	25	Passed	Carlton	—	—	Sam Philp long-term injury
3	26	Passed	St Kilda	—	—	Ben Paton long-term injury
4	27	Passed	St Kilda	—	—	Passed selection at the 2020 Rookie Draft

== Previous trades ==
Since 2015, clubs have been able to trade future picks in the next year's national draft during the trade period. As a result, a total of 30 selections for the 2021 draft were traded during the 2020 trade period. Further trades of future picks can be made before or during the 2020 national draft. The selection order for each of these picks is tied to the original club's finishing position in the 2021 season.

Table of previously traded selections
Rd	Orig. Club	New Club	Acquired via	Ref
1	Collingwood	Greater Western Sydney	Pick swap at the 2020 National Draft	
1	Melbourne	Brisbane Lions	Pick swap	
1	Geelong	Richmond	Pick swap at the 2020 National Draft	
2	Collingwood	Hawthorn	Pick swap at the 2020 National Draft	
2	St Kilda	Richmond	Jack Higgins trade	
2	Essendon	Geelong	via Greater Western Sydney (Jye Caldwell trade) on-traded to Geelong (Jeremy Cameron trade)	
2	Greater Western Sydney	Geelong	Jeremy Cameron trade	
2	Western Bulldogs	Collingwood	Adam Treloar trade	
2	Brisbane Lions	Melbourne	Pick swap	
2	Port Adelaide	West Coast	via Sydney (Aliir Aliir trade) on-traded to West Coast (Tom Hickey trade)	
2	Melbourne	Adelaide	Pick swap	
3	Gold Coast	Richmond	Oleg Markov trade	
3	Adelaide	Collingwood	Pick swap at the 2020 National Draft	
3	Hawthorn	Melbourne	Pick swap at the 2020 National Draft	
3	Carlton	Gold Coast	via Sydney (pick swap) on-traded to Gold Coast (pick swap)	
3	Fremantle	Collingwood	Pick swap at the 2020 National Draft	
3	West Coast	Brisbane Lions	Alex Witherden trade	
3	Sydney	West Coast	Tom Hickey trade	
3	Western Bulldogs	Melbourne	Mitch Hannan trade	
3	Port Adelaide	Essendon	Orazio Fantasia trade	
3	Melbourne	Gold Coast	via Brisbane Lions (pick swap) on-traded to Geelong (Nakia Cockatoo trade) on-traded to Gold Coast (pick swap)	
4	North Melbourne	Hawthorn	via Melbourne (Ben Brown trade) on-traded to Hawthorn (Pick swap at the 2020 National Draft)	
4	Collingwood	Brisbane Lions	Pick swap	
4	Hawthorn	Port Adelaide	via Adelaide (Kyle Hartigan trade) on-traded to Port Adelaide (Pick swap at the 2020 National Draft)	
4	Richmond	Hawthorn	via St Kilda (Jack Higgins trade) on-traded to Hawthorn (Pick swap at the 2020 National Draft)	
4	Fremantle	Adelaide	Pick swap	
4	Essendon	Gold Coast	Peter Wright trade	
4	Brisbane Lions	North Melbourne	via Melbourne (pick swap) on-traded to North Melbourne (Ben Brown trade)	
4	Melbourne	Brisbane Lions	via Adelaide (pick swap) on-traded to Brisbane Lions (pick swap)	
4	Geelong	Port Adelaide	via Greater Western Sydney (Jeremy Cameron trade) on-traded to Collingwood (Pick swap at the 2020 National Draft) on-traded to Port Adelaide (Pick swap at the 2020 National Draft)	

== Player movements ==
=== Free agency ===
2021 AFL free agency period signings
Player	Free agent type	Recruited from	New club	Compensation	Ref
Jake Kelly	Unrestricted	Adelaide	Essendon	3rd round	
Mabior Chol	Unrestricted	Richmond	Gold Coast	End of 2nd round	
George Hewett	Restricted	Sydney	Carlton	End of 2nd round	
Luke Dunstan	Unrestricted	St Kilda	Melbourne	None	
Tim O'Brien	Unrestricted	Hawthorn	Western Bulldogs	None	
Jarrod Brander	Delisted	West Coast	Greater Western Sydney	—N/a	
Sam Skinner ^{[a]}	Delisted	South Adelaide (SANFL)	Port Adelaide	—N/a	
Tom Campbell	Delisted	North Melbourne	St Kilda	—N/a	
Tyson Stengle ^{[b]}	Delisted	Woodville-West Torrens (SANFL)	Geelong	—N/a	
Hugh Greenwood	Delisted	Gold Coast	North Melbourne	—N/a	

- ^{a} Sam Skinner was delisted by Brisbane Lions in 2020
- ^{b} Tyson Stengle was delisted by Adelaide during the 2021 pre-season

=== Trades ===
Table of trades
Clubs involved	Trade		Ref
Gold Coast Collingwood	to Gold Coast (from Collingwood): 2022 second round pick (Collingwood); 2022 third round pick (Collingwood); 2022 fourth round pick (Collingwood)	to Collingwood (from Gold Coast): pick No. 22; pick No. 46; pick No. 58; pick No. 79; 2022 fourth round pick (Gold Coast)	
Collingwood; Geelong	to Collingwood (from Geelong): Nathan Kreuger; pick No. 55	to Geelong (from Collingwood): pick No. 41	
Port Adelaide Greater Western Sydney	to Port Adelaide (from Greater Western Sydney): Jeremy Finlayson	to Greater Western Sydney (from Port Adelaide): 2022 third round pick (Port Adelaide)	
Melbourne; Western Bulldogs; Adelaide; St Kilda	to Melbourne: pick No. 17 (from Western Bulldogs); pick No. 37 (from Adelaide); pick No. 49 (from St Kilda); to Western Bulldogs: pick No. 23 (from Adelaide); pick No. 44 (from Adelaide); pick No. 45 (from Melbourne)	to Adelaide: pick No. 33 (from Melbourne); pick No. 75 (from Western Bulldogs); 2022 first round pick (Melbourne); to St Kilda: pick No. 62 (from Adelaide); pick No. 66 (from Adelaide); 2022 fourth round pick (Adelaide)	
Collingwood Fremantle	to Collingwood (from Fremantle): pick No. 22	to Fremantle (from Collingwood): pick No. 27; 2022 third round pick (Fremantle)	
Fremantle; Gold Coast	to Fremantle (from Gold Coast): Will Brodie; pick No. 19; pick No. 61; pick No. 69	to Gold Coast (from Fremantle): 2022 second round pick (Fremantle); 2022 fourth round pick (Fremantle)	
Carlton Fremantle	to Carlton (from Fremantle): Adam Cerra	to Fremantle (from Carlton): pick No. 6; 2022 third round pick (Carlton)	
West Coast; Carlton; Western Bulldogs	to West Coast (from Carlton): Sam Petrevski-Seton; to Carlton (from Western Bulldogs): Lewis Young	to Western Bulldogs (from West Coast): pick No. 52	
North Melbourne Richmond	to North Melbourne (from Richmond): Callum Coleman-Jones; pick No. 42; pick No. 47; 2022 fourth round pick (Richmond)	to Richmond (from North Melbourne): Robbie Tarrant; pick No. 40; 2022 second round pick (North Melbourne)	
Collingwood; Western Bulldogs	to Collingwood (from Western Bulldogs): Patrick Lipinski	to Western Bulldogs (from Collingwood): pick No. 43	
Adelaide Sydney	to Adelaide (from Sydney): Jordan Dawson	to Sydney (from Adelaide): 2022 first round pick (Melbourne)	
Brisbane Lions; Geelong	to Brisbane Lions (from Geelong): Darcy Fort; pick No. 41	to Geelong (from Brisbane Lions): pick No. 50; 2022 third round pick (Brisbane Lions)	
Geelong Hawthorn	to Geelong (from Hawthorn): Jonathon Ceglar; 2022 fourth round pick (Hawthorn)	to Hawthorn (from Geelong): 2022 third round pick (Brisbane Lions)	
Fremantle; Geelong	to Fremantle (from Geelong): Jordan Clark; 2022 fourth round pick (Geelong)	to Geelong (from Fremantle): pick No. 22; 2022 third round pick (Carlton)	
Sydney Port Adelaide	to Sydney (from Port Adelaide): Peter Ladhams; pick No. 16	to Port Adelaide (from Sydney): pick No. 12; 2022 third round pick (Sydney)	
Hawthorn; Collingwood	to Hawthorn (from Collingwood): Max Lynch; 2022 third round pick (Fremantle); 2022 fourth round pick (Gold Coast)	to Collingwood (from Hawthorn): 2022 third round pick (Hawthorn); 2022 third round pick (Brisbane Lions)	
Richmond Collingwood	to Richmond (from Collingwood): pick No. 27	to Collingwood (from Richmond): pick No. 38; pick No. 40; 2022 third round pick (Richmond)	
Greater Western Sydney; Brisbane Lions	to Greater Western Sydney (from Brisbane Lions): pick No. 54	to Brisbane Lions (from Greater Western Sydney): 2022 third round pick (Port Adelaide)	
St Kilda Collingwood	to St Kilda (from Collingwood): pick No. 55	to Collingwood (from St Kilda): 2022 fourth round pick (Adelaide)	
Picks swapped at the 2021 National Draft
Geelong; Western Bulldogs	to Geelong (from Western Bulldogs): pick No. 23	to Western Bulldogs (from Geelong): pick No. 32; pick No. 34	
North Melbourne; Western Bulldogs	to North Melbourne (from Western Bulldogs): pick No. 32; pick No. 52; 2022 third round pick (Western Bulldogs)	to Western Bulldogs (from North Melbourne): pick No. 42; pick No. 47; 2022 third round pick (North Melbourne)	
North Melbourne; Collingwood	to North Melbourne (from Collingwood): pick No. 36	to Collingwood (from North Melbourne): pick No. 48; 2022 third round pick (Western Bulldogs)	
Port Adelaide; West Coast	to Port Adelaide (from West Coast): pick No. 12	to West Coast (from Port Adelaide): pick No. 14; 2022 second round pick (Port Adelaide)	
Collingwood; Greater Western Sydney	to Collingwood (from Greater Western Sydney): pick No. 48	to Greater Western Sydney (from Collingwood): 2022 fourth round pick (Adelaide)	
Adelaide; Melbourne	to Adelaide (from Melbourne): pick No. 43	to Melbourne (from Adelaide): 2022 third round pick (Adelaide)	
Port Adelaide; Carlton	to Port Adelaide (from Carlton): pick No. 55	to Carlton (from Port Adelaide): 2022 fourth round pick (Port Adelaide)	
Collingwood; Geelong	to Collingwood (from Geelong): pick No. 45	to Geelong (from Collingwood): pick No. 47; 2022 third round pick (Brisbane Lions)	
St Kilda; Melbourne	to St Kilda (from Melbourne): pick No. 51	to Melbourne (from St Kilda): 2022 fourth round pick (St Kilda)	
West Coast; Port Adelaide	to West Coast (from Port Adelaide): pick No. 62	to Port Adelaide (from West Coast): 2022 fourth round pick (West Coast)	

== List changes ==
=== Retirements ===
Table key
R	Rookie listed player
B	Category B Rookie listed player

Table of player retirements
Name	Club	Ref
Sam Lloyd	Western Bulldogs	
Ross McQuillan (B)	Essendon	
Tom Scully	Hawthorn	
Dylan Roberton	St Kilda	
Jonathon Patton	Hawthorn	
Levi Greenwood	Collingwood	
Chris Mayne	Collingwood	
Lin Jong	Western Bulldogs	
Daniel Venables (R)	West Coast	
Marc Murphy	Carlton	
Stephen Hill	Fremantle	
Tom Rockliff	Port Adelaide	
Patrick Ambrose	Essendon	
Jack Hombsch (R)	Gold Coast	
Jordan Murdoch (R)	Gold Coast	
Zac Smith (R)	Gold Coast	
Eddie Betts (R)	Carlton	
David Astbury	Richmond	
Cale Hooker	Essendon	
Jarrod Harbrow (R)	Gold Coast	
Shaun McKernan	St Kilda	
David Mackay (R)	Adelaide	
Bachar Houli	Richmond	
Shaun Burgoyne	Hawthorn	
Jake Carlisle	St Kilda	
James Frawley	St Kilda	
Anton Tohill (B)	Collingwood	
Nathan Vardy	West Coast	
Grant Birchall (R)	Brisbane Lions	
Nathan Jones	Melbourne	
Josh Jenkins	Geelong	
Archie Smith	Brisbane Lions	
Neville Jetta	Melbourne	
Lachie Henderson	Geelong	
Stefan Okunbor (B)	Geelong	
Josh Thomas	Collingwood	
Daniel Talia	Adelaide	
Easton Wood	Western Bulldogs	
Shane Mumford	Greater Western Sydney	
Liam Jones	Carlton	
Aaron vandenBerg	Melbourne	

=== Delistings ===
Table key
R	Rookie listed player
B	Category B Rookie listed player

Table of player delistings
Name	Club	Ref
Tyson Stengle	Adelaide	
Leno Thomas (B)	Fremantle	
Tom Lynch	Adelaide	
Levi Casboult	Carlton	
Reece Conca	Fremantle	
Patrick Naish	Richmond	
Brett Bewley (R)	Fremantle	
Taylin Duman	Fremantle	
Stefan Giro	Fremantle	
Tobe Watson (R)	Fremantle	
David Zaharakis	Essendon	
Taylor Garner	North Melbourne	
Dom Tyson	North Melbourne	
Will Walker	North Melbourne	
Connor Menadue (R)	North Melbourne	
James Cousins	Hawthorn	
Damon Greaves (R)	Hawthorn	
Michael Hartley	Hawthorn	
Keegan Brooksby (R)	Hawthorn	
Harry Pepper (B)	Hawthorn	
Mark Hutchings (R)	West Coast	
Brendon Ah Chee (R)	West Coast	
Irving Mosquito	Essendon	
Ned Cahill	Essendon	
Lachlan Johnson	Essendon	
Oscar Clavarino (R)	St Kilda	
Sam Alabakis (B)	St Kilda	
Hamish Hartlett	Port Adelaide	
Joel Garner	Port Adelaide	
Tyson Goldsack (R)	Port Adelaide	
Sam Reid	Greater Western Sydney	
Matthew Buntine	Greater Western Sydney	
Nick Shipley	Greater Western Sydney	
Tom Hutchesson	Greater Western Sydney	
Brayden Ainsworth	West Coast	
Ben Johnson	West Coast	
Will Collins (R)	West Coast	
Ben Jarvis	Geelong	
Cameron Taheny	Geelong	
Kaiden Brand	Sydney	
Sam Gray (R)	Sydney	
Matthew Ling	Sydney	
Malachy Carruthers (R)	Sydney	
Aiden Fyfe (R)	Gold Coast	
Jay Lockhart	Melbourne	
Aaron Nietschke (R)	Melbourne	
Austin Bradtke (B)	Melbourne	
Jarrod Cameron	West Coast	
Michael Gibbons	Carlton	
Sam Ramsay	Carlton	
Oscar Brownless (R)	Geelong	
Lochie O'Brien	Carlton	
Matt Cottrell (R)	Carlton	
Martin Gleeson (R)	Essendon	
Brayden Sier	Collingwood	
Jay Rantall	Collingwood	
Charlie Constable	Geelong	
Oliver Hanrahan	Hawthorn	
Will Hayes (R)	Western Bulldogs	
Ben Cavarra (R)	Western Bulldogs	
Jarrod Lienert	Port Adelaide	
Boyd Woodcock (R)	Port Adelaide	
Sam Mayes	Port Adelaide	
Trent Burgoyne (R)	Port Adelaide	
Derek Eggmolesse-Smith (R)	Richmond	
Ryan Garthwaite	Richmond	
Noah Cumberland	Richmond	
Bigoa Nyuon	Richmond	
Jack Lonie	St Kilda	
Marty Hore	Melbourne	
Kye Declase (R)	Melbourne	
Shaun Atley	North Melbourne	
Trent Dumont	North Melbourne	
Tom Campbell (R)	North Melbourne	
Charlie Ham (R)	North Melbourne	
Cam Ellis-Yolmen	Brisbane Lions	
Tom Joyce	Brisbane Lions	
Brock Smith	Brisbane Lions	
Connor Ballenden (R)	Brisbane Lions	
Jarrod Brander	West Coast	
Ben Davis	Adelaide	
Ronin O'Connor	Adelaide	
Paul Hunter	St Kilda	
Connor Blakely	Fremantle	
Mitch Crowden	Fremantle	
Jacob Townsend (R)	Gold Coast	
Luke Towey (B)	Gold Coast	
Jared Polec	North Melbourne	
Lewis Taylor	Sydney	
Dylan Clarke	Essendon	
Hugh Greenwood	Gold Coast	
Rory Thompson	Gold Coast	
Jez McLenan	Gold Coast	
Jacob Wehr	Greater Western Sydney	

== 2021 national draft ==
^	Denotes player who has been inducted to the Australian Football Hall of Fame
*	Denotes player who has been a premiership player and been selected for at least one All-Australian team
^{+}	Denotes player who has been a premiership player at least once
^{x}	Denotes player who has been selected for at least one All-Australian team
^{#}	Denotes player who has never played in a VFL/AFL home and away season or finals game
^{~}	Denotes player who has been selected as Rising Star

Table of national draft selections
Round	Pick	Player	Club	Recruited from		Notes
Round	Pick	Player	Club	Club	League	Notes
1	1	Jason Horne-Francis	North Melbourne	South Adelaide	SANFL	
1	2	Sam Darcy	Western Bulldogs	Oakleigh Chargers	NAB League	Father–son selection (son of Luke Darcy), matched bid by Greater Western Sydney, used picks 34, 42, 43, 44, 45
1	3	Finn Callaghan	Greater Western Sydney	Sandringham Dragons	NAB League	←Collingwood (2020)
1	4	Nick Daicos	Collingwood	Oakleigh Chargers	NAB League	Father–son selection (son of Peter Daicos), matched bid by Gold Coast, used picks 38, 40, 42, 44
1	5	Mac Andrew	Gold Coast	Dandenong Stingrays	NAB League	
1	6	Josh Rachele	Adelaide	Murray Bushrangers	NAB League	
1	7	Josh Ward	Hawthorn	Northern Knights	NAB League	
1	8	Jye Amiss	Fremantle	East Perth	WAFL	←Carlton
1	9	Josh Gibcus	Richmond	GWV Rebels	NAB League	
1	10	Neil Erasmus	Fremantle	Subiaco	WAFL	
1	11	Nasiah Wanganeen-Milera	St Kilda	Glenelg	SANFL	
1	12	Josh Sinn	Port Adelaide	Sandringham Dragons	NAB League	←West Coast (draft)
1	13	Ben Hobbs	Essendon	GWV Rebels	NAB League	
1	14	Campbell Chesser	West Coast	Sandringham Dragons	NAB League	←Port Adelaide (draft)←Sydney
1	15	Leek Aleer	Greater Western Sydney	Central District	SANFL	
1	16	Darcy Wilmot	Brisbane Lions	Northern Knights	NAB League	
1	17	Tom Brown	Richmond	Murray Bushrangers	NAB League	←Geelong (2020)
1	18	Angus Sheldrick	Sydney	Claremont	WAFL	←Port Adelaide
1	19	Jacob van Rooyen	Melbourne	Claremont	WAFL	←Western Bulldogs
1	20	Kai Lohmann	Brisbane Lions	GWV Rebels	NAB League	←Melbourne (2020)
2	21	Matthew Johnson	Fremantle	Subiaco	WAFL	←Gold Coast (priority pick)
2	22	Josh Goater	North Melbourne	Calder Cannons	NAB League	
2	23	Sam Butler	Hawthorn	GWV Rebels	NAB League	←Collingwood (2020)
2	24	Toby Conway	Geelong	Geelong Falcons	NAB League	←Fremantle←Collingwood←Gold Coast
2	25	Mitch Knevitt	Geelong	Geelong Falcons	NAB League	←Western Bulldogs (draft)←Adelaide
2	26	Connor MacDonald	Hawthorn	Dandenong Stingrays	NAB League	
2	27	Jesse Motlop	Carlton	South Fremantle	WAFL	
2	28	Tyler Sonsie	Richmond	Eastern Ranges	NAB League	
2	29	Sam Banks	Richmond	Tasmania Devils	NAB League	←Collingwood←Fremantle
2	30	Judson Clarke	Richmond	Dandenong Stingrays	NAB League	←St Kilda (2020)
2	31	Brady Hough	West Coast	Peel Thunder	WAFL	
2	32	James Willis	Geelong	North Adelaide	SANFL	←Greater Western Sydney (2020)←Essendon (2020)
2	33	Mitchito Owens	St Kilda	Sandringham Dragons	NAB League	Next Generation Academy selection (Japanese descent), matched bid by Sydney, used picks 48 and 54
2	34	Matthew Roberts	Sydney	South Adelaide	SANFL	
2	35	Paul Curtis	North Melbourne	Western Jets	NAB League	←Western Bulldogs (draft)←Geelong (draft)←Greater Western Sydney (2020)
2	36	Jake Soligo	Adelaide	Eastern Ranges	NAB League	←Melbourne←Brisbane Lions (2020)
2	37	Rhett Bazzo	West Coast	Swan Districts	WAFL	←Sydney (2020)←Port Adelaide (2020)
2	38	Miller Bergman	North Melbourne	Dandenong Stingrays	NAB League	←Collingwood (draft)←Western Bulldogs (2020)
2	39	Blake Howes	Melbourne	Sandringham Dragons	NAB League	←Adelaide←Melbourne (2020)
3	40	Corey Warner	Sydney	East Fremantle	WAFL	Free agency compensation pick (Hewett)
3	41	James Tunstill	Brisbane Lions	East Perth	WAFL	←Geelong←Collingwood
3	42	Josh Fahey	Greater Western Sydney	Queanbeyan Tigers	AFL Canberra	Academy selection, matched bid by Western Bulldogs, used picks 47 and 89
3	43	Arthur Jones	Western Bulldogs	Claremont	WAFL	←North Melbourne (draft)←Richmond←Gold Coast (2020)
3	44	Zac Taylor	Adelaide	Calder Cannons	NAB League	←Melbourne (draft)←St Kilda
3	45	Arlo Draper	Collingwood	South Adelaide	SANFL	
3	46	Alastair Lord	Essendon	Norwood	SANFL	
3	47	Marcus Windhager	St Kilda	Sandringham Dragons	NAB League	Next Generation Academy selection (Indigenous), matched bid by Geelong, used pick 57
3	48	Flynn Kroeger	Geelong	Eastern Ranges	NAB League	←Brisbane Lions←West Coast (2020)
3	49	Cooper Murley	Collingwood	Norwood	SANFL	←North Melbourne (draft)←Western Bulldogs (draft)←Carlton←West Coast←Sydney (2020)
3	50	Garrett McDonagh	Essendon	Richmond	VFL	←Port Adelaide (2020)
3	51	Oscar Adams	St Kilda	Glenelg	SANFL	←Melbourne (draft)←Western Bulldogs (2020)
3	52	Harvey Harrison	Collingwood	North Adelaide	SANFL	←Gold Coast←Geelong (2020)←Brisbane Lions (2020)←Melbourne (2020)
4	53	Jai Serong	Hawthorn	Gippsland Power	NAB League	←Melbourne (2020)←North Melbourne (2020)
4	54	Eric 'Roy' Benning	Fremantle	Claremont	WAFL	Next Generation Academy selection (Indigenous) ←Gold Coast
4	55	Hugh Jackson	Port Adelaide	North Adelaide	SANFL	←Adelaide (2020)←Hawthorn (2020)
4	56	Dante Visentini	Port Adelaide	Sandringham Dragons	NAB League	←Carlton (draft)
4	57	Jack Williams	West Coast	East Fremantle	WAFL	
4	58	Lachlan Rankin	Sydney	Oakleigh Chargers	NAB League	
4	59	Jackson Archer	North Melbourne	Northern Knights	NAB League	Father–son selection (son of Glenn Archer) ←Melbourne (2020)←Brisbane Lions (2020)
4	60	Jase Burgoyne	Port Adelaide	Woodville-West Torrens	SANFL	Father–son selection (son of Peter Burgoyne) ←Collingwood (2020)←Greater Western Sydney (2020)←Geelong (2020)
4	61	Luke Cleary	Western Bulldogs	Sandringham Dragons	NAB League	
4	62	Greg Clark	West Coast	Subiaco	WAFL	←Port Adelaide (draft)
4	63	Charlie Constable	Gold Coast	Geelong	AFL	
4	64	Cooper Whyte	Geelong	Geelong Falcons	NAB League	
4	65	Taj Woewodin	Melbourne	East Fremantle	WAFL	Father–son selection (son of Shane Woewodin)

=== Rookie elevations ===
Clubs were able to promote any player who was listed on their rookie list in 2021 to their 2022 primary playing list prior to the draft.

Table of rookie elevations
Player	Club
Ben Keays	Adelaide
Josh Honey	Carlton
Matthew Kennedy	Carlton
Will Snelling	Essendon
Ethan Hughes	Fremantle
Emerson Jeka	Hawthorn
Dylan Moore	Hawthorn
Ned Reeves	Hawthorn
James Jordon	Melbourne
Martin Frederick	Port Adelaide
Rhyan Mansell	Richmond
Callum Wilkie	St Kilda
Ryan Gardner	Western Bulldogs

== 2022 pre-season draft ==
Table of pre-season draft selections
Round	Pick	Player	Club	Recruited from		Notes
Round	Pick	Player	Club	Club	League	Notes
1	1	Passed	North Melbourne	—	—	
1	2	Passed	Collingwood	—	—	
1	3	Rory Thompson	Gold Coast	Gold Coast	AFL	
1	4	Luke Nankervis	Adelaide	Sandringham Dragons	NAB League	
1	5	Passed	Essendon	—	—	

== 2022 rookie draft ==
Table of rookie draft selections
Round	Pick	Player	Club	Recruited from		Notes
Round	Pick	Player	Club	Club	League	Notes
1	1	Jared Polec	North Melbourne	North Melbourne	AFL	
1	2	Charlie Dean	Collingwood	Williamstown	VFL	
1	3	Levi Casboult	Gold Coast	Carlton	AFL	
1	4	Ben Davis	Adelaide	Adelaide	AFL	
1	5	Ned Long	Hawthorn	Northern Knights	NAB League	
1	6	Lochie O'Brien	Carlton	Carlton	AFL	
1	7	Bigoa Nyuon	Richmond	Richmond	AFL	
1	8	Karl Worner	Fremantle	Oakleigh Chargers	NAB League	
1	9	Passed	St Kilda	—	—	
1	10	Passed	West Coast	—	—	
1	11	Patrick Voss	Essendon	Oakleigh Chargers	NAB League	
1	12	Lewis Taylor	Sydney	Sydney	AFL	
1	13	Cooper Hamilton	Greater Western Sydney	Bendigo Pioneers	NAB League	
1	14	Cam Ellis-Yolmen	Brisbane Lions	Brisbane Lions	AFL	
1	15	Oliver Dempsey	Geelong	Old Carey Grammarians	VAFA	
1	16	Trent Dumont	Port Adelaide	North Melbourne	AFL	
1	17	Charlie Parker	Western Bulldogs	Sturt	SANFL	
1	18	Judd McVee	Melbourne	East Fremantle	WAFL	
2	19	Passed	North Melbourne	—	—	
2	20	Isaac Chugg	Collingwood	Collingwood	AFL	
2	21	Jez McLennan	Gold Coast	Gold Coast	AFL	
2	22	Passed	Adelaide	—	—	
2	23	Passed	Hawthorn	—	—	
2	24	Matt Cottrell	Carlton	Carlton	AFL	
2	25	Mitch Crowden	Fremantle	Fremantle	AFL	
2	26	Passed	St Kilda	—	—	
2	27	Passed	Essendon	—	—	
2	28	Passed	Sydney	—	—	
2	29	Jacob Wehr	Greater Western Sydney	Greater Western Sydney	AFL	
2	30	Passed	Geelong	—	—	
2	31	Sam Mayes	Port Adelaide	Port Adelaide	AFL	
2	32	Robbie McComb	Western Bulldogs	Footscray	VFL	
3	33	Passed	Gold Coast	—	—	
3	34	Connor Blakely	Fremantle	Fremantle	AFL	
3	35	Passed	Essendon	—	—	
4	36	Sandy Brock	Gold Coast	Peel Thunder	WAFL	Academy selection
5	37	Bodhi Uwland	Gold Coast	Broadbeach	QAFL	Academy selection

=== Category B rookie selections ===
Table of Category B rookie selections
Name	Club	Origin	Note	Ref
Domanic Akuei	Carlton	Northern Knights (NAB League)	Next Generation Academy selection (Sudanese descent)	
Fionn O'Hara	Hawthorn	Westmeath GAA	International selection (Ireland)	
Andy Moniz-Wakefield	Melbourne	NT Thunder (NAB League)	Next Generation Academy selection (indigenous)	
Jack Peris	St Kilda	Sandringham Dragons (NAB League)	Next Generation Academy selection (indigenous)	
Josiah Kyle	St Kilda	Dandenong Stingrays (NAB League)	Next Generation Academy selection (indigenous)	
Cody Raak	Western Bulldogs	Western Jets (NAB League)	Next Generation Academy selection (indigenous)	

=== Pre-season supplemental selection period ===
Table of Pre-season supplemental selection period signings
Player	Club	Recruited from		Notes	Ref
Player	Club	Club	League	Notes	Ref
Mitch Cox	Brisbane Lions	Williamstown	VFL		
Tex Wanganeen	Essendon	Sturt	SANFL	Son of Gavin Wanganeen	
Nic Martin	Essendon	Subiaco	WAFL		
James Tsitas	Gold Coast	Woodville-West Torrens	SANFL		
Tom Lynch	North Melbourne	Adelaide	AFL		
Jack Hayes	St Kilda	Woodville-West Torrens	SANFL		
Jarrod Lienert	St Kilda	Port Adelaide	AFL		
Paddy McCartin	Sydney	Sydney	VFL	Previously listed with St Kilda	
Hugh Dixon	West Coast	East Fremantle	WAFL	Previously listed with Fremantle	
Luke Strnadica	West Coast	East Fremantle	WAFL	Previously listed with Fremantle	
Patrick Naish	West Coast	Richmond	AFL		
Tom Joyce	West Coast	Brisbane Lions	AFL		

== See also ==
- 2021 AFL Women's draft
