= Robbie McComb =

Australian rules footballer

Personal information
- Full name: Robert McComb
- Born: 19 December 1995 (age 30)
- Original teams: Footscray (VFL); Vermont (EFL)
- Draft: No. 32, 2022 rookie draft
- Debut: Round 6, Western Bulldogs vs. Adelaide, at Eureka Stadium
- Height: 181 cm (5 ft 11 in)
- Weight: 82 kg (181 lb)
- Position: Midfielder

Playing career^{1}
Years	Club	Games (Goals)
2022–2023	Western Bulldogs	18 (7)
- ^{1} Playing statistics correct to the end of 2023.

Robbie McComb (born 19 December 1995) is a former professional Australian rules footballer who played for the Western Bulldogs in the Australian Football League (AFL).

== Early life ==
Originally from Vermont Football Club in the Eastern Football League, McComb spent four years with Footscray, the Bulldogs reserves affiliate in the Victorian Football League (VFL). In the 2021 VFL season, McComb was selected in the Team of the Year and won Footscray's best and fairest award.

== AFL career ==
McComb was selected by the Western Bulldogs with the 32nd pick in the 2022 rookie draft.

He made his AFL debut in round 6 of the 2022 AFL season, against the Adelaide Football Club at Eureka Stadium. McComb starred in his second game at senior level, collecting 21 disposals and kicking two goals in the win against Essendon. He played in his final final in the elimination final against Fremantle, but failed to impact with just 4% time on ground as the Bulldogs exited the finals series.

=== Post-AFL career ===
McComb was delisted at the end of the 2023 season after three games for the season and 18 AFL games total. He joined Port Melbourne in the VFL the following year before moving to amateur club Port Melbourne Colts in the Southern Football League in 2025. As of 2026, McComb is a player-coach at Tooleybuc-Manangatang in the Central Murray Football Netball League.

== Statistics ==
As of the end of the 2023 season

Legend
G	Goals	K	Kicks	D	Disposals	T	Tackles
B	Behinds	H	Handballs	M	Marks

Season	Team	No.	Games	Totals							Averages (per game)						
Season	Team	No.	Games	G	B	K	H	D	M	T	G	B	K	H	D	M	T
2022	Western Bulldogs	27	15	6	5	93	88	181	32	23	0.4	0.3	6.2	5.9	12.1	2.1	1.5
2023	Western Bulldogs	27	3	1	0	7	6	13	4	2	0.3	0.0	2.3	2.0	4.3	1.3	0.7
Career			18	7	5	100	94	194	36	25	0.4	0.3	5.6	5.2	10.8	2.0	1.4
