= Blake Howes =

Australian rules footballer

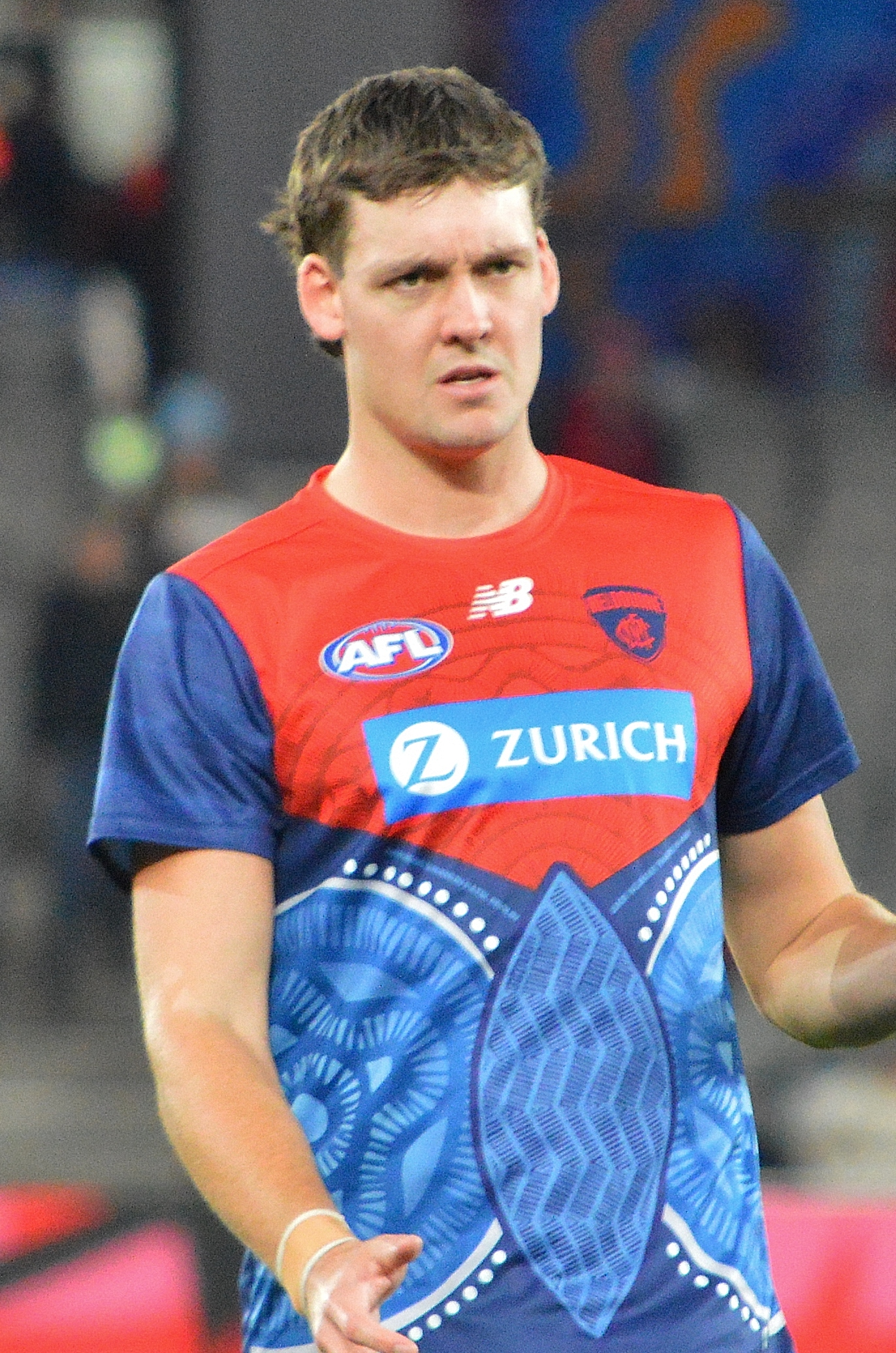
- Howes in May 2026

Personal information
- Born: 7 April 2003 (age 23)
- Original team: Sandringham Dragons (TAC Cup)
- Draft: No. 39 2021 national draft
- Debut: Round 1, 2024, Melbourne vs. Sydney, at SCG
- Height: 191 cm (6 ft 3 in)
- Position: Medium defender

Club information
- Current club: Melbourne
- Number: 22

Playing career^{1}
Years	Club	Games (Goals)
2022–	Melbourne	48 (1)
- ^{1} Playing statistics correct to the end of round 22, 2026.

Blake Howes (born 7 April 2003) is a professional Australian rules footballer playing for the Melbourne Football Club in the Australian Football League (AFL). A medium defender, he is 1.91 metres (6 ft 3 in) tall. He made his debut in the twenty-two point loss to Sydney at the Sydney Cricket Ground in round 1 of the 2024 season.

== Statistics ==
Updated to the end of round 22, 2026.

Legend
G	Goals	K	Kicks	D	Disposals	T	Tackles
B	Behinds	H	Handballs	M	Marks

Season	Team	No.	Games	Totals							Averages (per game)							Votes
Season	Team	No.	Games	G	B	K	H	D	M	T	G	B	K	H	D	M	T	Votes
2022	Melbourne	22	0	—	—	—	—	—	—	—	—	—	—	—	—	—	—	0
2023	Melbourne	22	0	—	—	—	—	—	—	—	—	—	—	—	—	—	—	0
2024	Melbourne	22	16	0	1	119	84	203	72	26	0.0	0.1	7.4	5.3	12.7	4.5	1.6	0
2025	Melbourne	22	12	1	0	63	67	130	40	23	0.1	0.0	5.3	5.6	10.8	3.3	1.9	0
2026	Melbourne	22	20	0	0	156	147	303	97	39	0.0	0.0	7.8	7.4	15.2	4.9	2.0	0
Career			48	1	1	338	298	636	209	88	0.0	0.0	7.0	6.2	13.3	4.4	1.8	0
