= Jed McEntee =

Personal information
- Born: 15 February 2001 (age 25)
- Original team: Sturt (SANFL)/Mitcham Hawks
- Draft: No. 13, 2021 mid-season rookie draft
- Height: 176 cm (5 ft 9 in)
- Weight: 80 kg (176 lb)

Playing career
Years	Club	Games (Goals)
2021–2025	Port Adelaide	52 (31)

Jed McEntee (born 15 February 2001) is a former Australian rules footballer who played for the Port Adelaide Football Club in the Australian Football League (AFL).

McEntee, a Mitcham junior, played for Sturt in the SANFL and won the club's emerging talent award in 2020. He came to Port Adelaide via the 2021 mid-season rookie draft, making his league debut in round 18.

McEntee spent 4 and a half seasons at Port Adelaide, playing 52 senior matches, before being delisted at the end of the 2025 AFL season.

== Statistics ==
Legend
G	Goals	K	Kicks	D	Disposals	T	Tackles
B	Behinds	H	Handballs	M	Marks

Season	Team	No.	Games	Totals							Averages (per game)							Votes
Season	Team	No.	Games	G	B	K	H	D	M	T	G	B	K	H	D	M	T	Votes
2021	Port Adelaide	41	1	0	0	0	1	1	0	0	0.0	0.0	0.0	1.0	1.0	0.0	0.0	0
2022	Port Adelaide	41	9	5	4	26	42	68	13	23	0.6	0.4	2.9	4.7	7.6	1.4	2.6	0
2023	Port Adelaide	41	22	14	3	99	108	207	48	64	0.6	0.1	4.5	4.9	9.4	2.2	2.9	0
2024	Port Adelaide	41	14	7	4	49	51	100	19	39	0.5	0.3	3.5	3.6	7.1	1.4	2.8	0
2025	Port Adelaide	41	6	5	5	33	19	52	8	18	0.8	0.8	5.5	3.2	8.7	1.3	3.0	0
Career			52	31	16	207	221	428	88	144	0.6	0.3	4.0	4.3	8.2	1.7	2.8	0
