= Arty Jones =

Australian rules footballer (born 2003)

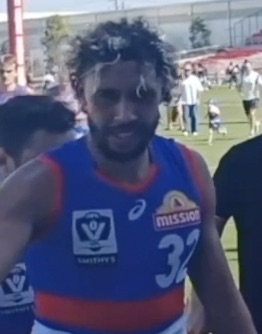
- Jones in March 2026

Personal information
- Full name: Arthur Jones
- Born: 18 July 2003 (age 23); Mount Barker, Western Australia
- Original team: Claremont/Wesley College
- Draft: No. 43, 2021 AFL draft
- Debut: 30 March 2023, Western Bulldogs vs. Brisbane Lions, at Docklands
- Height: 180 cm (5 ft 11 in)
- Weight: 71 kg (157 lb)
- Positions: Midfield, Forward

Club information
- Current club: Western Bulldogs
- Number: 32

Playing career^{1}
Years	Club	Games (Goals)
2023–	Western Bulldogs	38 (34)
- ^{1} Playing statistics correct to the end of the 2026 season.

Career highlights
- Footscray VFL premiership player: 2025

Arthur Jones (born 18 July 2003) is a professional Australian rules footballer who plays for the Western Bulldogs in the Australian Football League (AFL).

== AFL career ==
Jones was selected by the Western Bulldogs with the 43rd pick in the 2021 AFL draft. During his draft year he played for Claremont Football Club at colts level and for his school Wesley College.

He made his AFL debut in round 3 of the 2023 AFL season, against the Brisbane Lions at Docklands.

== Statistics ==
Updated to the end of round 22, 2026.

Legend
G	Goals	K	Kicks	D	Disposals	T	Tackles
B	Behinds	H	Handballs	M	Marks

Season	Team	No.	Games	Totals							Averages (per game)							Votes
Season	Team	No.	Games	G	B	K	H	D	M	T	G	B	K	H	D	M	T	Votes
2023	Western Bulldogs	32	13	4	8	47	52	99	17	35	0.3	0.6	3.6	4.0	7.6	1.3	2.7	0
2024	Western Bulldogs	32	1	1	1	5	3	8	4	0	1.0	1.0	5.0	3.0	8.0	4.0	0.0	0
2025	Western Bulldogs	32	4	2	0	6	12	18	3	5	0.5	0.0	1.5	3.0	4.5	0.8	1.3	0
2026	Western Bulldogs	32	16	17	15	96	84	180	47	32	1.1	0.9	6.0	5.3	11.3	2.9	2.0	0
Career			34	24	24	154	151	305	71	72	0.7	0.7	4.5	4.4	9.0	2.1	2.1	0
