= Rhett Bazzo =

Australian rules footballer

Personal information
- Born: 17 October 2003 (age 23)
- Original teams: Swan Districts (WAFL); South Mandurah (PFL); Guilford Grammar (PSA)
- Draft: No. 37, 2021 national draft
- Debut: Round 14, 2022, West Coast vs. Geelong, at Perth Stadium
- Height: 195 cm (6 ft 5 in)
- Weight: 86 kg (190 lb)
- Position: Defender

Club information
- Current club: West Coast
- Number: 33

Playing career^{1}
Years	Club	Games (Goals)
2022–	West Coast	40 (0)
- ^{1} Playing statistics correct to the end of round 22, 2026.

Rhett Bazzo (born 17 October 2003) is a professional Australian rules footballer who plays for the West Coast Eagles in the Australian Football League (AFL).

== Early life ==
Growing up in Perth, Australia, Bazzo played junior amateur football for South Mandurah in the Peel Football League as well as school football for Guilford Grammar in the Public Schools Association.

He also represented Western Australia at junior level in his draft year of 2021.

Rhett is the son of the late Steve Bazzo, who played 230 games in the Western Australian Football League (WAFL) for Swan Districts, West Perth, and Peel Thunder.

== AFL career ==
He was draft by the West Coast Eagles with their third pick and the 37th overall in the 2021 national draft.

Bazzo made his AFL debut in the round 14 clash against eventual 2022 premiers Geelong at Perth Stadium, becoming the Eagles' 14th debutant of the year.

== Statistics ==
Updated to the end of round 22, 2026.

Legend
G	Goals	K	Kicks	D	Disposals	T	Tackles
B	Behinds	H	Handballs	M	Marks

Season	Team	No.	Games	Totals							Averages (per game)							Votes
Season	Team	No.	Games	G	B	K	H	D	M	T	G	B	K	H	D	M	T	Votes
2022	West Coast	33	9	0	1	57	32	89	38	10	0.0	0.1	6.3	3.6	9.9	4.2	1.1	0
2023	West Coast	33	11	0	0	41	54	95	34	8	0.0	0.0	3.7	4.9	8.6	3.1	0.7	0
2024	West Coast	33	1	0	0	4	2	6	3	1	0.0	0.0	4.0	2.0	6.0	3.0	1.0	0
2025	West Coast	33	7	0	0	40	36	76	35	12	0.0	0.0	5.7	5.1	10.9	5.0	1.7	0
2026	West Coast	33	12	0	0	61	80	141	62	13	0.0	0.0	5.1	6.7	11.8	5.2	1.1	0
Career			40	0	1	203	204	407	172	44	0.0	0.0	5.1	5.1	10.2	4.3	1.1	0
