= Josh Gibcus =

Australian rules footballer

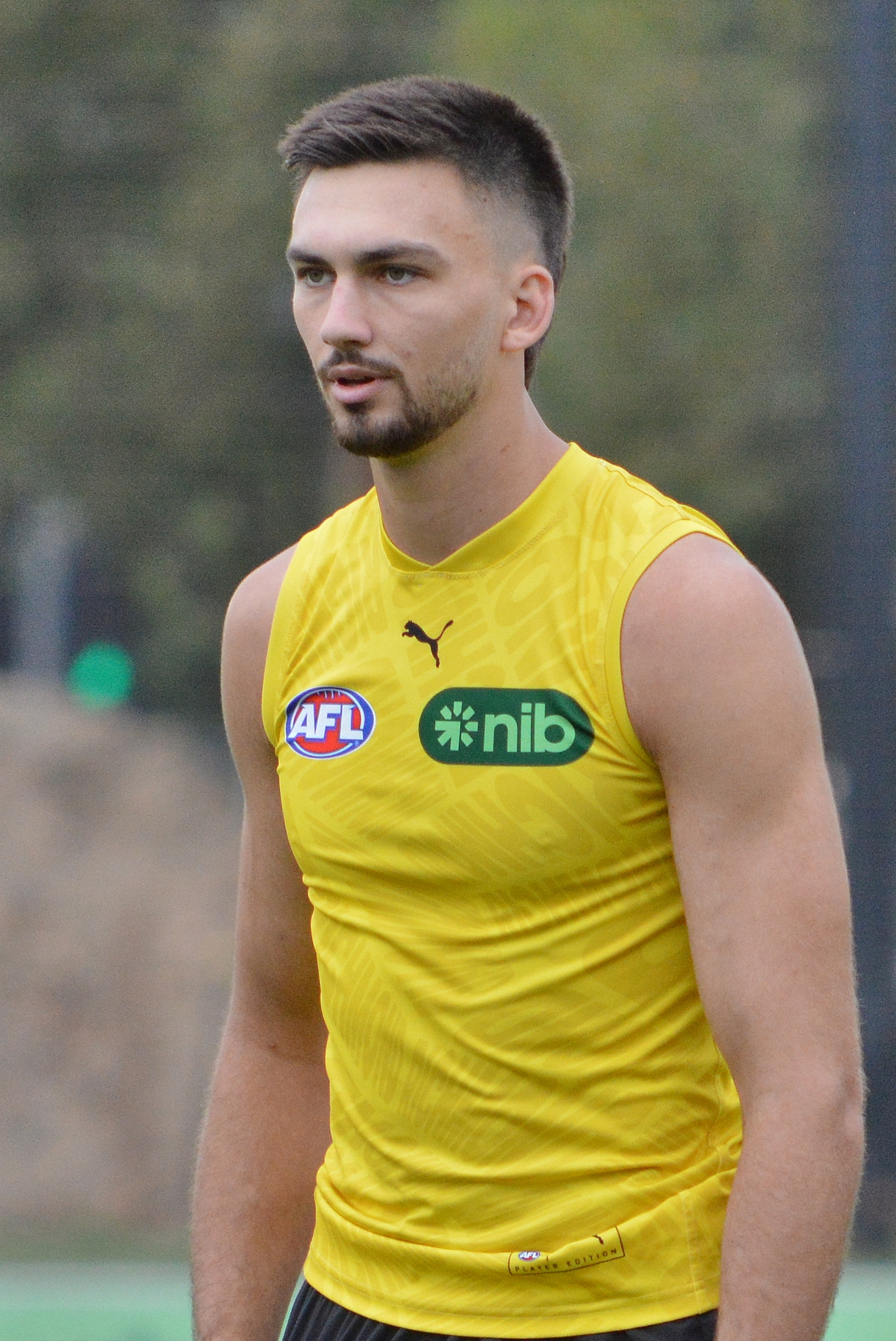
- Gibcus in March 2026

Personal information
- Full name: Joshua Gibcus
- Born: 4 April 2003 (age 23); Brisbane, Queensland, Australia
- Original teams: GWV Rebels (NAB League); East Point Football Club (BFL)
- Draft: No. 9, 2021 AFL National Draft: Richmond
- Debut: Round 1, 2022, Richmond vs. Carlton, at MCG
- Height: 196 cm (6 ft 5 in)
- Position: Key Defender

Club information
- Current club: Richmond
- Number: 18

Playing career^{1}
Years	Club	Games (Goals)
2022–	Richmond	22 (3)
- ^{1} Playing statistics correct to the end of 2026.

Joshua Gibcus (born 4 April 2003) is an Australian rules footballer who plays for the Richmond Football Club in the Australian Football League (AFL). An intercepting key position defender, he was a top ten pick in the 2021 AFL draft and made his debut in the first round of the 2022 season. In each of his second and third AFL seasons he would suffer long-term hamstring and knee injuries that restricted him to just two matches over that period.

== Early life and junior football ==
Gibcus was born in Brisbane, where his family remained through the age of seven and where he first learned to play football in the Auskick junior training program. He took up competition football after his family moved to Perth, where they remained until he turned 14. During that time, he represented Western Australia at the AFL Under 12 national championships.

The family moved once again when Gibcus was 14, this time to the regional Victorian town of Ballarat, where he spent the remainder of his teenage years. There he played junior football for East Point Football Club, attended high school at St Patrick's College and played with St Patricks' top-level football side from 2019 as a year-10 student. In the same year he represented Victoria's Country region at the Under 16 national championships.

Gibcus' participation in competitive football in 2020 and 2021 were limited by the cancellation and intermittent operation of sports events caused by the impacts of the COVID-19 pandemic.

In 2020, Gibcus was a member of the Greater Western Victoria Rebels NAB League representative squad, though was unable to play competitive matches that year owing to the cancellation of the season. That same year, Gibcus was also a member of the Ballarat Miners basketball team's NBL1 South squad.

The following year saw Gibcus make his NAB League debut, eventually featuring in 10 matches through the interrupted season. Gibcus averaged eight intercepts and three intercept marks per game for the Rebels that season, earning selection to the competition's team of the year. In the absence of an official Under 19 national championships in 2021, Gibcus participated in an exhibition challenge match between Victoria's Country and Metropolitan sides in July. That same year he also featured in an AFL Academy representative team match against the Geelong VFL side.

== AFL career ==
Gibcus was drafted by Richmond with the club's first pick and the ninth selection overall in the 2021 AFL draft.

He made his AFL debut in the opening round of the 2022 AFL season.

In 2023, Gibcus did not feature in competition football at any level, owing to a severe hamstring tendon injury and later complications with recurring wound infections and atrophy of the muscle. In the off-season that followed he visited leading sports medicine professionals in Qatar to assist in his recovery.

Gibcus made his return in Opening Round of the 2024 season, recording nine disposals in a match against Gold Coast at People First Stadium. He played just one more match that season however, rupturing the ACL in his right knee while landing awkwardly in a marking contest midway through the following week's loss to Carlton at the MCG.

Gibcus travelled again to Qatar in the 2024/25 off-season to visit rehabilitation specialists, eventually making a return to light running in January 2025. In May, Gibcus was given a return to play schedule for the first time that season, with a seven-to-ten week timeframe listed for his return.

== Player profile ==
Gbcus plays as a key position defender. He is adept at intercept marking, demonstrating a large vertical leap and strong skills at reading the ball's trajectory in flight. Prior to being drafted to the AFL, his playing style was compared to Melbourne defender Jake Lever.

== Statistics ==
Updated to the end of round 22, 2026.

Legend
G	Goals	K	Kicks	D	Disposals	T	Tackles
B	Behinds	H	Handballs	M	Marks

Season	Team	No.	Games	Totals							Averages (per game)							Votes
Season	Team	No.	Games	G	B	K	H	D	M	T	G	B	K	H	D	M	T	Votes
2022	Richmond	28	18	3	1	99	66	165	62	22	0.2	0.1	5.5	3.7	9.2	3.4	1.2	0
2023		28	0	—	—	—	—	—	—	—	—	—	—	—	—	—	—	0
2024	Richmond	18	2	0	0	7	3	10	2	4	0.0	0.0	3.5	1.5	5.0	1.0	2.0	0
2025	Richmond	18	1	0	0	5	2	7	3	0	0.0	0.0	5.0	2.0	7.0	3.0	0.0	0
2026	Richmond	18	1	0	0	6	3	9	4	4	0.0	0.0	6.0	3.0	9.0	4.0	4.0	0
Career			22	3	1	117	74	191	71	30	0.1	0.0	5.3	3.4	8.7	3.2	1.4	0
