= Josh Ward =

Australian rules footballer (born 2003)

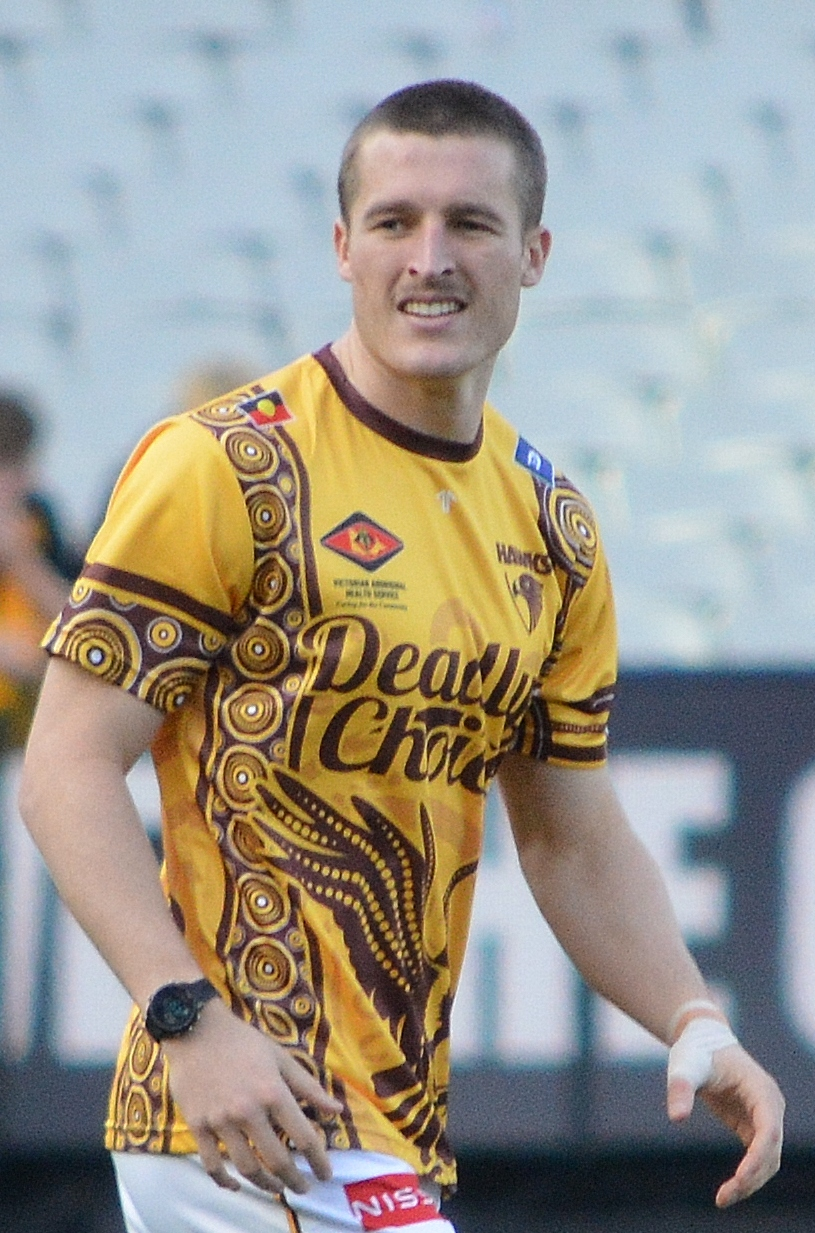
- Ward in May 2026

Personal information
- Born: 15 August 2003 (age 23); Victoria, Australia
- Original teams: Northern Knights (Talent League); Melbourne Grammar (APS); Fitzroy (YJFL)
- Draft: No. 7, 2021 AFL draft, Hawthorn
- Debut: 20 March 2022, Hawthorn vs. North Melbourne, at MCG
- Height: 183 cm (6 ft 0 in)
- Weight: 80 kg (176 lb)
- Position: Midfielder

Club information
- Current club: Hawthorn
- Number: 25

Playing career^{1}
Years	Club	Games (Goals)
2022–	Hawthorn	92 (14)
- ^{1} Playing statistics correct to the end of 2026.

Career highlights
- Rising Star nominee: 2022

Josh Ward (born 15 August 2003) is an Australian rules footballer who plays for the Hawthorn Football Club in the Australian Football League (AFL). He was recruited with the 7th draft pick in the 2021 AFL draft.

== Early life ==
Ward began his Australian rules football career at the Fitzroy Junior Football Club in the Yarra Junior Football League, back in 2012. Ward then was selected to play for the Northern Knights in the 2021 NAB League Boys season. Ward played well during his time with the Knights, averaging 30.2 disposals and being named the captain in the NAB League Boys Team of the Year. Ward was also selected as a representative for the Vic Metro squad to play in a match against Vic Country, where he was selected captain of the team and was one of the best on ground, collecting 29 disposals, two goals and eight clearances. Ward also attended Melbourne Grammar School with future teammate Ned Long. Ward scored well in the draft combine, running a time of 5:57 in the 2km time trial, the second best time in the country. The majority of the media predicted Ward to get selected by Hawthorn in the draft, and this ended up eventuating, with Ward being selected with the Hawks first pick, and 7th overall, in the 2021 AFL draft.

== AFL career ==
Ward impressed early in his first pre-season with the Hawks, being named likely by the media to debut in round one. Coach Sam Mitchell expressed that Ward had been training at a 'high standard'. Ward debuted for the Hawks in their game against North Melbourne opening round of the 2022 AFL season, collecting 13 disposals and three marks. Despite an ankle injury concern after the game, Ward was available to play the next round. Ward received a Rising Star nomination for his performance against West Coast during round 18.

== Statistics ==
Updated to the end of 2026.

Legend
G	Goals	K	Kicks	D	Disposals	T	Tackles
B	Behinds	H	Handballs	M	Marks

Season	Team	No.	Games	Totals							Averages (per game)							Votes
Season	Team	No.	Games	G	B	K	H	D	M	T	G	B	K	H	D	M	T	Votes
2022	Hawthorn	25	14	2	2	158	109	267	53	41	0.1	0.1	11.3	7.8	19.1	3.8	2.9	0
2023	Hawthorn	25	16	2	3	181	151	332	76	31	0.1	0.2	11.3	9.4	20.8	4.8	1.9	0
2024	Hawthorn	25	12	1	3	96	83	179	49	28	0.1	0.3	8.0	6.9	14.9	4.1	2.3	0
2025	Hawthorn	25	25	3	4	261	253	514	79	89	0.1	0.2	10.4	10.1	20.6	3.2	3.6	7
2026	Hawthorn	25	22	6	4	267	295	562	102	96	0.2	0.2	10.7	11.8	22.5	4.1	3.8	3
Career			92	14	16	963	891	1854	359	285	0.2	0.2	10.5	9.7	20.2	3.9	3.1	10

== Honours and achievements ==
Team

- McClelland Trophy (Hawthorn): 2024

Individual

- AFL Rising Star nominee: 2022

== Personal life ==
Ward is the great grandson of former Hawthorn player Alex Lee.

During school he also excelled academically as well as in sport achieving an ATAR above 99. He is currently studying Politics and Law at Monash University.
