= Angus Sheldrick =

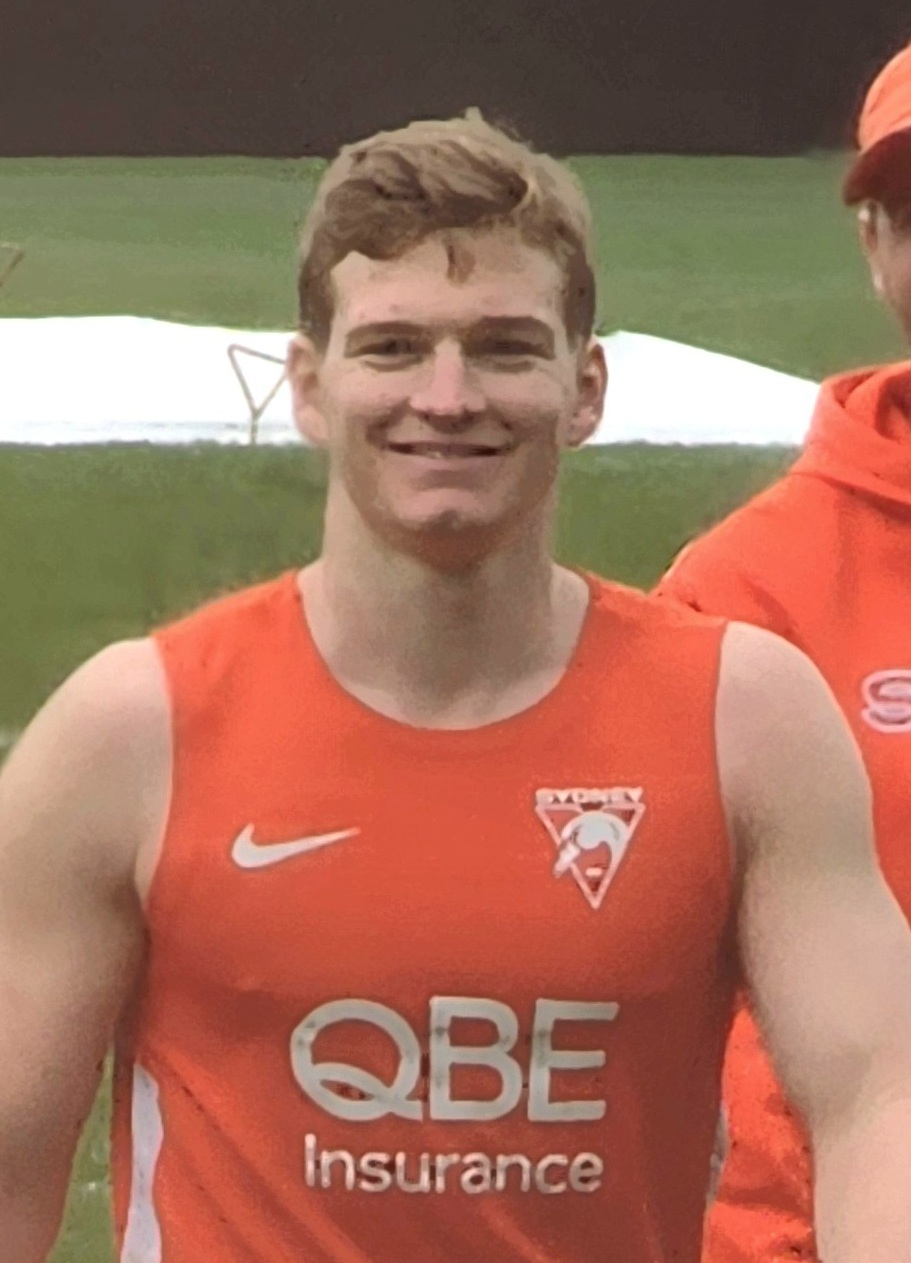
- Sheldrick in 2026

Personal information
- Born: 7 November 2003 (age 22)
- Original team: Claremont Football Club
- Draft: No. 18, 2021 AFL draft
- Debut: Round 1, 2022, Sydney Swans vs. Greater Western Sydney Giants, at Stadium Australia
- Height: 178 cm (5 ft 10 in)
- Position: Midfielder

Club information
- Current club: Sydney
- Number: 12

Playing career^{1}
Years	Club	Games (Goals)
2022–	Sydney	46 (13)
- ^{1} Playing statistics correct to the end of round 22, 2026.

Angus Sheldrick (born 7 November 2003) is a professional Australian rules footballer who plays for the Sydney Swans in the Australian Football League (AFL).

Sheldrick is from Western Australia and played for Claremont Football Club in the West Australian Football League Colts. He was drafted with pick 18 in the 2021 AFL draft and made his debut for Sydney in Round 1, 2022. He earned a AFL Rising Star nomination in Round 15, 2023.

== Statistics ==
Updated to the end of round 22, 2026.

Legend
G	Goals	K	Kicks	D	Disposals	T	Tackles
B	Behinds	H	Handballs	M	Marks

Season	Team	No.	Games	Totals							Averages (per game)							Votes
Season	Team	No.	Games	G	B	K	H	D	M	T	G	B	K	H	D	M	T	Votes
2022	Sydney	29	2	0	0	4	4	8	1	1	0.0	0.0	2.0	2.0	4.0	0.5	0.5	0
2023	Sydney	29	7	3	3	49	58	107	19	24	0.4	0.4	7.0	8.3	15.3	2.7	3.4	0
2025	Sydney	12	20	6	6	177	144	321	38	74	0.3	0.3	8.9	7.2	16.1	1.9	3.7	0
2026	Sydney	12	17	4	6	158	187	345	38	64	0.2	0.4	9.3	11.0	20.3	2.2	3.8	0
Career			46	13	15	388	393	781	96	163	0.3	0.3	8.4	8.5	17.0	2.1	3.5	0
