= Ned Long =

Australian rules football player

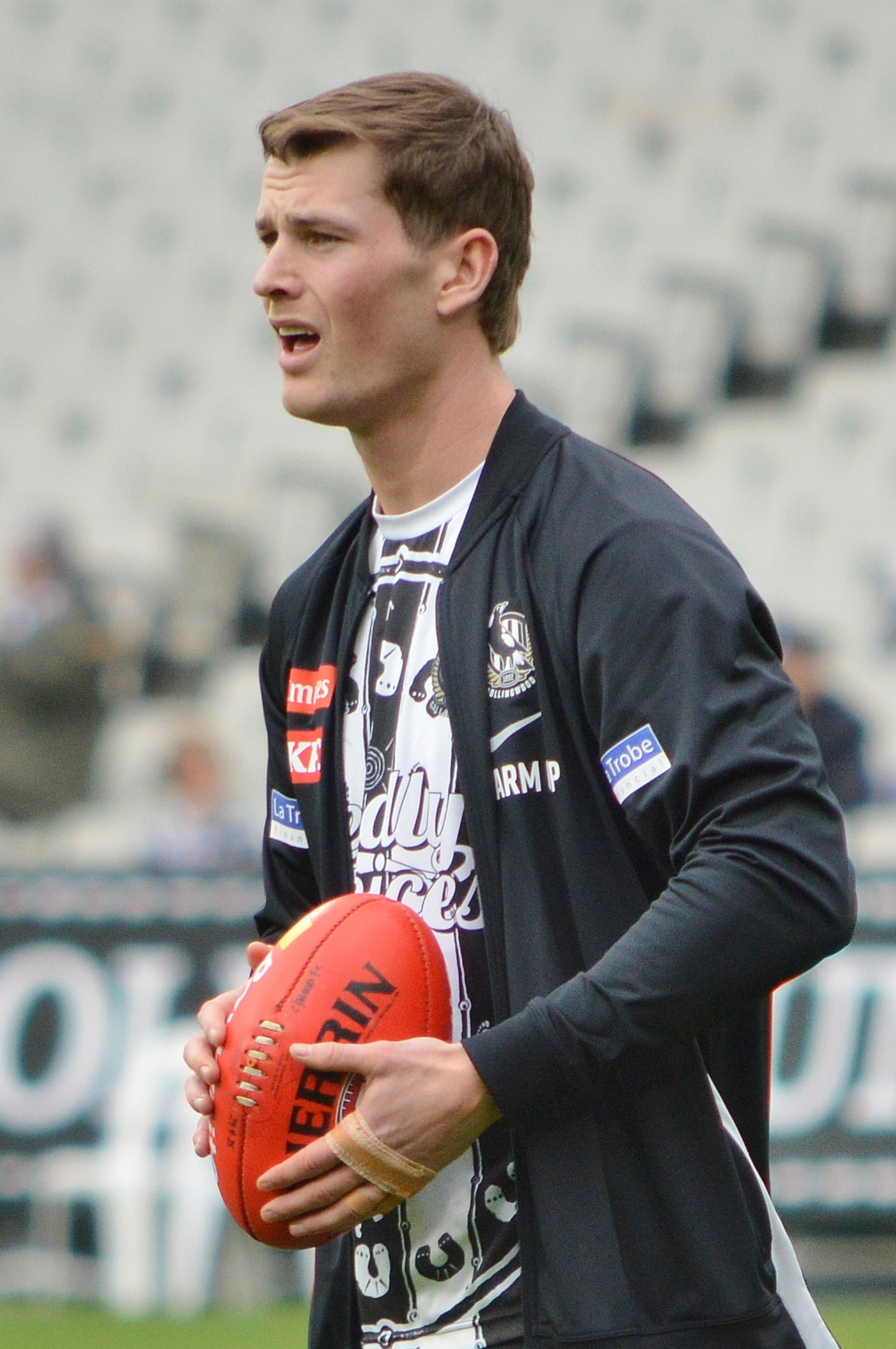
- Long in May 2025

Personal information
- Full name: Ned Matthew Long
- Born: 5 February 2003 (age 23)
- Original teams: Northern Knights (NAB League); Fitzroy (YJFL)
- Draft: No. 5, 2021 rookie draft No. 19 2024 mid-season draft
- Debut: Round 23, 2022, Hawthorn vs. Western Bulldogs, at York Park, Launceston
- Height: 194 cm (6 ft 4 in)
- Weight: 92 kg (203 lb)
- Position: Midfielder

Club information
- Current club: Collingwood
- Number: 44

Playing career^{1}
Years	Club	Games (Goals)
2022–2023	Hawthorn	5 (1)
2024–	Collingwood	54 (16)
Total		59 (17)
- ^{1} Playing statistics correct to the end of the 2026 season.

Ned Matthew Long (born 5 February 2003) is a professional Australian rules footballer who plays for the Collingwood Football Club in the Australian Football League. He has previously played for Hawthorn.

== Early life ==
Long represented Victoria in the Under 15 School Sport competition alongside future Northern Knights and Hawthorn teammate Josh Ward, who he had also grown up playing with at Fitzroy Junior Football Club. Long had been impressive early in 2021 until injury saw him drop down the ratings in the eyes of recruiters. Overlooked in the main draft Hawthorn selected him with their first pick of the rookie draft. He was educated at Northcote High School and Melbourne Grammar.

== AFL career ==
Long was selected by Hawthorn with their 5th pick of the 2022 rookie draft. He made his debut in round 23 of the 2022 AFL season, in which Hawthorn played the Western Bulldogs at University of Tasmania Stadium in Launceston. In October 2023, Long was delisted by the club after playing five senior games.

Two months after being delisted by Hawthorn, Long joined Collingwood's VFL side. Five months later, he was promoted to the club's senior side through the 2024 mid-season rookie draft using their 19th pick. He made his debut for the club in round 17 of the season against Essendon at the MCG.

== Statistics ==
Updated to the end of round 22, 2026.

Legend
G	Goals	K	Kicks	D	Disposals	T	Tackles
B	Behinds	H	Handballs	M	Marks

Season	Team	No.	Games	Totals							Averages (per game)							Votes
Season	Team	No.	Games	G	B	K	H	D	M	T	G	B	K	H	D	M	T	Votes
2022	Hawthorn	27	1	0	0	10	1	11	7	1	0.0	0.0	10.0	1.0	11.0	7.0	1.0	0
2023	Hawthorn	27	4	1	1	14	20	34	6	16	0.3	0.3	3.5	5.0	8.5	1.5	4.0	0
2024	Collingwood	44	7	2	2	31	28	59	10	37	0.3	0.3	4.4	4.0	8.4	1.4	5.3	0
2025	Collingwood	44	25	7	8	182	264	446	62	176	0.3	0.3	7.3	10.6	17.8	2.5	7.0	0
2026	Collingwood	44	19	6	12	114	195	309	52	116	0.3	0.6	6.0	10.3	16.3	2.7	6.1	0
Career			56	16	23	351	508	859	137	346	0.3	0.4	6.3	9.1	15.3	2.4	6.2	0
