= Taj Woewodin =

Australian rules footballer

Personal information
- Full name: Taj Woewodin
- Born: 26 March 2003 (age 23)
- Original team: Coorparoo JAFC/ Booragoon Junior Football Club / East Fremantle
- Draft: No. 65, 2021 national draft
- Debut: Round 17, 2023, Melbourne vs. St Kilda, at Docklands
- Height: 182 cm (6 ft 0 in)
- Position: Medium defender

Club information
- Current club: Collingwood VFL

Playing career^{1}
Years	Club	Games (Goals)
2022–2025	Melbourne	21 (3)
- ^{1} Playing statistics correct to the end of the 2025 season: VFL premiership player: 2022.

Taj Woewodin (born 26 March 2003) is an Australian rules footballer who last played for the Melbourne Football Club in the Australian Football League (AFL). A medium defender who made his debut in the 21-point win against St Kilda at the Docklands Stadium in Round 17 of the 2023 season. Ultimately, Woewodin was delisted at the end of the 2025 AFL season, after four seasons at the Melbourne Football Club in which he played 21 matches. On 2 February 2026 the Collingwood football club announced the signing of Woewodin as part of their VFL side for the upcoming 2026 VFL Season.

== Statistics ==
Updated to the end of the 2025 season.

Legend
G	Goals	K	Kicks	D	Disposals	T	Tackles
B	Behinds	H	Handballs	M	Marks

Season	Team	No.	Games	Totals							Averages (per game)							Votes
Season	Team	No.	Games	G	B	K	H	D	M	T	G	B	K	H	D	M	T	Votes
2022	Melbourne	40	0	—	—	—	—	—	—	—	—	—	—	—	—	—	—	0
2023	Melbourne	40	4	2	1	18	19	37	8	7	0.5	0.3	4.5	4.8	9.3	2.0	1.8	0
2024	Melbourne	40	16	1	2	69	49	118	41	25	0.1	0.1	4.3	3.1	7.4	2.6	1.6	0
2025	Melbourne	40	1	0	0	6	4	10	1	1	0.0	0.0	6.0	4.0	10.0	1.0	1.0	0
Career			21	3	3	93	72	165	50	33	0.1	0.1	4.4	3.4	7.9	2.4	1.6	0
