= Luke Cleary =

Australian rules footballer

Personal information
- Born: 5 March 2002 (age 24)
- Original teams: Sandringham Dragons (Talent League); Beaumaris (VAFA); Haileybury College (APS)
- Draft: No. 61, 2021 national draft
- Debut: Round 9, 2022, Western Bulldogs vs. Collingwood, at Docklands Stadium
- Height: 190 cm (6 ft 3 in)
- Weight: 78 kg (172 lb)
- Position: Defender

Club information
- Current club: Western Bulldogs
- Number: 36

Playing career^{1}
Years	Club	Games (Goals)
2022–	Western Bulldogs	25 (2)
- ^{1} Playing statistics correct to the end of round 22, 2026.

Luke Cleary (born 5 March 2002) is a professional Australian rules footballer who plays for the Western Bulldogs in the Australian Football League (AFL).

== AFL career ==
Cleary was selected by the Western Bulldogs with the 61st pick in the 2021 national draft.

Cleary made his AFL debut in round 9 of the 2022 AFL season, against the Collingwood Football Club at Docklands Stadium.

== Statistics ==
Updated to the end of round 22, 2026.

Legend
G	Goals	K	Kicks	D	Disposals	T	Tackles
B	Behinds	H	Handballs	M	Marks

Season	Team	No.	Games	Totals							Averages (per game)							Votes
Season	Team	No.	Games	G	B	K	H	D	M	T	G	B	K	H	D	M	T	Votes
2022	Western Bulldogs	36	4	0	0	17	12	29	13	3	0.0	0.0	4.3	3.0	7.3	3.3	0.8	0
2023	Western Bulldogs	36	1	0	0	5	3	8	2	1	0.0	0.0	5.0	3.0	8.0	2.0	1.0	0
2024	Western Bulldogs	36	2	0	0	14	8	22	9	1	0.0	0.0	7.0	4.0	11.0	4.5	0.5	0
2025	Western Bulldogs	36	16	2	3	121	90	211	68	25	0.1	0.2	7.6	5.6	13.2	4.3	1.6	0
2026	Western Bulldogs	36	2	0	0	9	5	14	3	1	0.0	0.0	4.5	2.5	7.0	1.5	0.5	0
Career			25	2	3	166	118	284	95	31	0.1	0.1	6.6	4.7	11.4	3.8	1.2	0
