= Levi Casboult =

Australian rules footballer

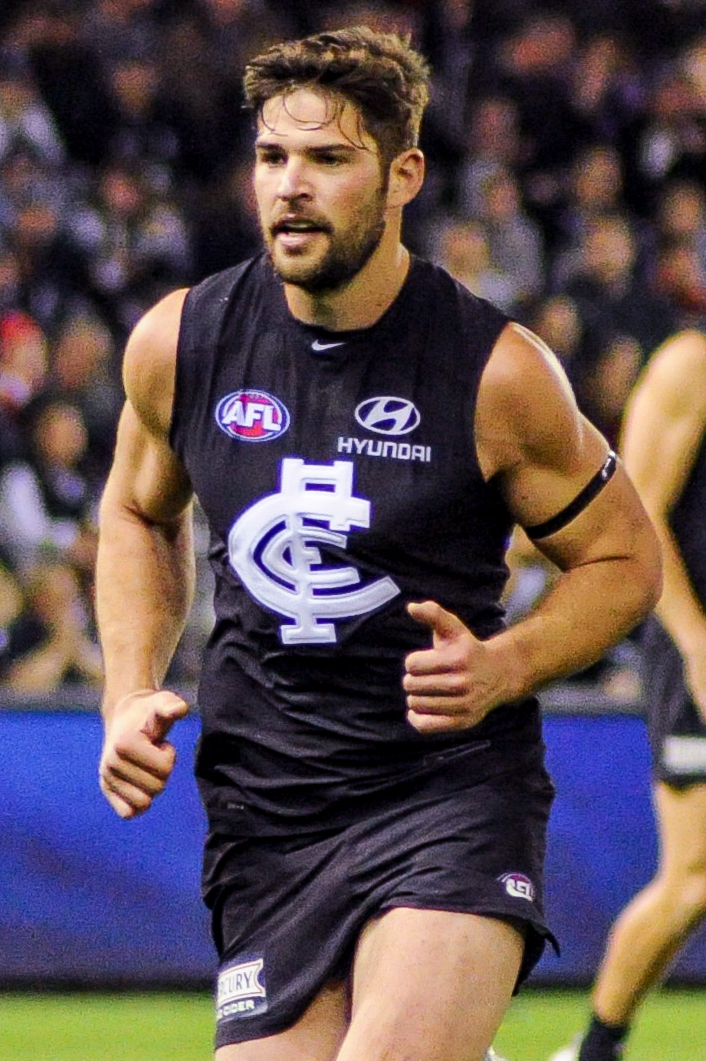
- Casboult playing for Carlton in 2017

Personal information
- Full name: Levi Casboult
- Born: 15 March 1990 (age 36); Hobart, Tasmania
- Original team: Dandenong Stingrays
- Draft: No. 44, 2010 rookie draft No. 3, 2022 rookie draft
- Height: 201 cm (6 ft 7 in)
- Weight: 101 kg (223 lb)
- Position: Key forward

Playing career
Years	Club	Games (Goals)
2010–2021	Carlton	154 (156)
2022–2024	Gold Coast	44 (59)
Total		198 (215)

Career highlights
- Carlton leading goalkicker: 2017; Grogan Medal: 2025

Levi Casboult (born 15 March 1990) is a former Australian rules footballer, who played for the Gold Coast Suns in the Australian Football League, having formerly played for the Carlton Football Club from 2010 to 2021.

Casboult, a tall and solidly built player, spent much of his formative years as a ruckman and key position player. Casboult began to play TAC Cup football with the Dandenong Stingrays in 2007. He played a total of 44 games with the Stingrays; in his first two seasons, he scored only three goals, but in 2009 he was moved into a key forward role and scored 41 goals in 20 matches.

Casboult was recruited by the Carlton Football Club with its third round selection in the 2010 AFL Rookie Draft (at selection 44 overall). His first month at the club was eventful. Before the 2009 Christmas break, Casboult attended the team's controversial booze cruise (the fallout from which included the suspensions of Andrew Walker, Eddie Betts and Ryan Houlihan, plus a "please explain" to the club from the AFL); it was widely reported in the media that, in an initiation game, Casboult was handcuffed to an unnamed senior player and forced to match him drink-for-drink until barely conscious. A few days later, on 24 December, Casboult was fortunate to walk away uninjured from in a head-on car accident: his car was struck by the car of Samir Azemi, which had jumped the median strip on the Princes Highway in Dandenong. Azemi was killed in the accident.

Playing as a key forward and occasional ruckman for the club's VFL-affiliate, the Northern Blues, Casboult did not play an AFL game for Carlton in his first two seasons after being drafted, and was even on occasion dropped to the VFL reserves. A PCL injury at the start of 2012 made his chances of ever making his senior debut seem unlikely; but, only two VFL games after his return from that injury, Casboult was called into the senior team for his debut as starting ruckman in Round 17, 2012, after injuries and suspension resulted in Carlton's first three ruck choices all being unavailable for selection.

Casboult won a regular place in the senior team in 2014, playing as a forward and sometimes as a back-up ruckman. Over the course of his career, he gained attention as one of the strongest contested marks in the competition. and he was a Mark of the Year finalist in 2014. Through the early part of his career, this strength in his game was offset by very poor goalkicking accuracy from set shots, returning less than 50% each season and not reliable even at close range; but after working with former Collingwood and North Melbourne full forward Saverio Rocca in 2015 and again in 2017, became one of the team's most reliable set shots. He led the team in goalkicking for the only time in his career in 2017, with a return of 34 goals, 18 behinds, and signed a two-year contract extension with the club after the season.

After a 2018 season was abbreviated by injury, Casboult returned as a regular to the team in 2019 and 2020, and began playing swing key position roles in both the forwardline and backline, as well as back-up ruck. Falling out of form in 2021, Casboult played about half of the season in the senior team and was delisted at the end of the year, after 154 senior games. He was subsequently picked up by Gold Coast in the 2022 rookie draft. Casboult kicked 59 goals in his first two seasons at Gold Coast, finishing second in the Club goalkicking award in 2022, and third in 2023. After managing only 3 games for the 2024 AFL season, Casboult announced his retirement from the AFL in October. In December, he joined Palm Beach Currumbin as both a player and an assistant coach.

== Statistics ==
Legend
G	Goals	K	Kicks	D	Disposals	T	Tackles
B	Behinds	H	Handballs	M	Marks	H/O	Hit-outs

Season	Team	No.	Games	Totals								Averages (per game)								Votes
Season	Team	No.	Games	G	B	K	H	D	M	T	H/O	G	B	K	H	D	M	T	H/O	Votes
2012	Carlton	41	6	7	12	37	17	54	31	12	43	1.2	2.0	6.2	2.8	9.0	5.2	2.0	7.2	0
2013	Carlton	41	11	7	7	63	37	100	48	18	68	0.6	0.6	5.7	3.4	9.1	4.4	1.6	6.2	0
2014	Carlton	41	19	15	11	109	91	200	108	43	131	0.8	0.6	5.7	4.8	10.5	5.7	2.3	6.9	0
2015	Carlton	41	16	24	12	100	50	150	83	15	86	1.5	0.8	6.3	3.1	9.4	5.2	0.9	5.4	0
2016	Carlton	41	20	18	18	119	72	191	107	26	6	0.9	0.9	6.0	3.6	9.6	5.4	1.3	0.3	0
2017	Carlton	41	22	34	18	144	76	220	120	39	157	1.5	0.8	6.5	3.5	10.0	5.5	1.8	7.1	0
2018	Carlton	41	10	12	10	61	25	86	37	12	76	1.2	1.0	6.1	2.5	8.6	3.7	1.2	7.6	0
2019	Carlton	41	20	15	11	159	64	223	114	44	163	0.8	0.6	8.0	3.2	11.2	5.7	2.2	8.2	0
2020 (Note: The 2020 season was played with 17 home-and-away matches per team (down from 22) and 16-minute quarters with time on (down from 20-minute quarters with time on) due to the impact of the COVID-19 pandemic.)	Carlton	41	17	16	8	112	40	152	80	31	86	0.9	0.5	6.6	2.4	8.9	4.7	1.8	5.1	2
2021	Carlton	41	13	8	5	77	34	111	47	25	79	0.6	0.4	5.9	2.6	8.5	3.6	1.9	6.1	0
2022	Gold Coast	30	21	35	22	114	47	161	79	21	10	1.7	1.0	5.4	2.2	7.7	3.8	1.0	0.5	0
2023	Gold Coast	30	20	24	11	138	57	195	95	29	93	1.2	0.6	6.9	2.9	9.8	4.8	1.5	4.7	0
2024	Gold Coast	30	3	0	1	15	12	27	6	6	23	0.0	0.3	5.0	4.0	9.0	2.0	2.0	7.7	0
Career			198	215	146	1248	622	1870	955	321	1021	1.1	0.7	6.3	3.1	9.4	4.8	1.6	5.2	2
