= Miller Bergman =

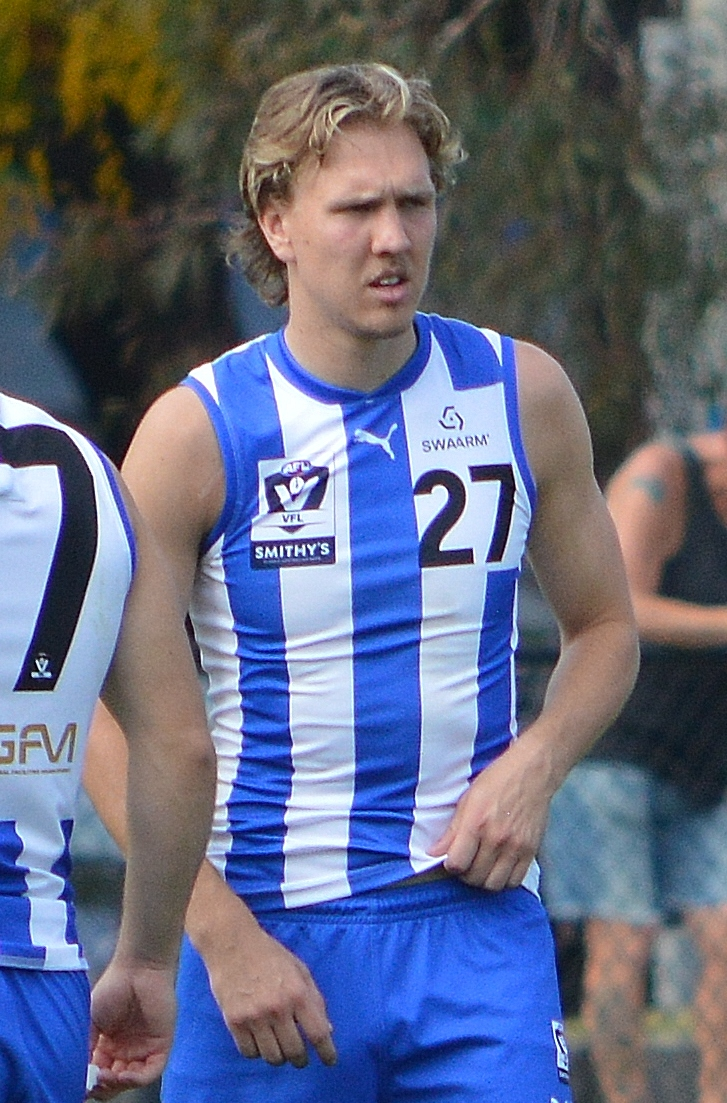
- Bergman with North Melbourne's VFL side in April 2025

Personal information
- Nickname: Ice
- Born: 25 January 2003 (age 23)
- Original team: Dandenong Stingrays
- Draft: No. 38, 2021 national draft
- Debut: 30 April 2022, North Melbourne vs. Carlton, at Marvel Stadium
- Height: 189 cm (6 ft 2 in)
- Weight: 73 kg (161 lb)
- Position: Defender

Playing career
Years	Club	Games (Goals)
2022–2025	North Melbourne	16 (0)

Miller Bergman is a former professional Australian rules footballer who played for the North Melbourne Football Club in the Australian Football League (AFL).

== Early life ==
Bergman was born on 25 January 2003 and attended Mazenod College. He was raised a North Melbourne supporter, as his father Shannon was drafted by the club in 1989, though he never played a senior game. Bergman played for the Dandenong Stingrays at under 18s level, making a name for himself as an elite decision maker. His U18 season was heavily interrupted by the COVID-19 pandemic, so Bergman used his time away from football to build elite fitness and running capacity. He was drafted by the North Melbourne Football Club with the 38th selection in the 2021 National Draft.

== AFL career ==
Bergman made his AFL debut for North Melbourne in their 50-point loss to Carlton in Round 7 of the 2022 season. Bergman was a late inclusion to the side, replacing fellow defender Aidan Corr. In the second quarter, Bergman won a clearance out of defense, but was tackled as he kicked the ball, landed hard on his right shoulder, and was subbed out of the game. As a result of this injury, he missed the remainder of the 2022 season.

Following a strong performance on return to North Melbourne's side in Round 1 of 2023, Bergman signed a two-year contract extension to remain at the club until the end of 2025.

Bergman was delisted at the end of the 2025 AFL season, after 4 seasons at the club for a total of 16 games.

== Statistics ==
Legend
G	Goals	K	Kicks	D	Disposals	T	Tackles
B	Behinds	H	Handballs	M	Marks

Season	Team	No.	Games	Totals							Averages (per game)							Votes
Season	Team	No.	Games	G	B	K	H	D	M	T	G	B	K	H	D	M	T	Votes
2022	North Melbourne	27	1	0	0	1	0	1	0	0	0.0	0.0	1.0	0.0	1.0	0.0	0.0	0
2023	North Melbourne	27	12	0	0	86	51	137	42	13	0.0	0.0	7.2	4.3	11.4	3.5	1.1	0
2024	North Melbourne	27	3	0	0	16	6	22	9	2	0.0	0.0	5.3	2.0	7.3	3.0	0.7	0
2025	North Melbourne	27	0	—	—	—	—	—	—	—	—	—	—	—	—	—	—	0
Career			16	0	0	103	57	160	51	15	0.0	0.0	6.4	3.6	10.0	3.2	0.9	0
