= Greg Clark (Australian footballer) =

Australian rules footballer

Personal information
- Full name: Gregory Charles Clark
- Born: 24 May 1997 (age 29)
- Original team: Subiaco (WAFL)
- Draft: No. 62, 2021 national draft
- Height: 195 cm (6 ft 5 in)
- Weight: 94 kg (207 lb)
- Position: Midfielder

Club information
- Current club: West Coast
- Number: 39

Playing career^{1}
Years	Club	Games (Goals)
2022–2023	West Coast	21 (3)
- ^{1} Playing statistics correct to the end of Round 12, 2023.

Career highlights
- Simpson Medal: 2021; 3x WAFL Premiership Player: (2018, 2019, 2021); Western Australia under 18 captain: 2015

Gregory Charles Clark (born 24 May 1997) is a former Australian rules footballer who last played for the West Coast Eagles in the Australian Football League (AFL).

== Early life ==
Clark was a recognized talent from a young age, playing for the WA State 16s and 18s, including captaining the WA State 18s at the 2015 NAB AFL National Championships. Despite being invited to participate in the 2015 National Combine, Clark was overlooked at the 2015 AFL draft. Clark then carved out a very successful playing career at Subiaco, playing in three winning WAFL grand final teams, winning the Simpson Medal as best on field as Subiaco defeated South Fremantle in the 2021 WAFL grand final, despite injuring his AC joint in a collision in the first quarter. Clark had an outstanding 2021 WAFL season, ranking first for tackles (7.3), fifth for disposals (27.1), seventh for contested possessions and twelfth for score involvements, finishing equal third in the Sandover Medal.

== AFL career ==
Clark was drafted by West Coast with pick 62 in the 2021 national draft. The club was able to draft Clark by trading away their 2022 fourth round pick to Port Adelaide. Clark had turned off the draft coverage after West Coast selected Jack Williams with pick 57, their last pick and didn't know he had been drafted until being informed by his manager.

=== 2022 ===
Clark was expected to make his debut in Round 1, but hurt his AC joint that he injured in the WAFL grand final, leading him to miss 8–10 weeks. He made his debut for the West Coast WAFL team in round 1 of the 2022 WAFL season collecting 18 disposals and 9 tackles. After another strong performance in the WAFL, Clark was named on the Interchange for West Coast's round 7 fixture against Richmond, becoming the 12th Eagle to debut that season. Despite West Coast's 109 point defeat, Clark had a promising debut collecting 24 disposals and tackling 6 times.

=== 2023 ===
Clark was delisted by the West Coast Eagles at the conclusion of 2023 AFL season, finishing his AFL career without ever experiencing a victory at the highest level.

== Statistics ==
Statistics are correct to the end of round 14, 2022

Legend
G	Goals	K	Kicks	D	Disposals	T	Tackles
B	Behinds	H	Handballs	M	Marks

Season	Team	No.	Games	Totals							Averages (per game)						
Season	Team	No.	Games	G	B	K	H	D	M	T	G	B	K	H	D	M	T
2022	West Coast	39	6	1	1	48	39	87	22	31	0.17	0.17	8.0	6.50	14.50	3.67	5.17
Career			6	1	1	48	39	87	22	31	0.17	0.17	8.0	6.50	14.50	3.67	5.17
