= Charlie Constable =

Australian rules footballer

Personal information
- Full name: Charlie Constable
- Born: 18 May 1999 (age 27)
- Original team: Sandringham Dragons (TAC Cup)/Haileybury, Melbourne
- Draft: No. 36, 2017 national draft No. 63, 2021 national draft
- Debut: Round 1, 2019, Geelong vs. Collingwood, at Melbourne Cricket Ground
- Height: 191 cm (6 ft 3 in)
- Weight: 86 kg (190 lb)
- Position: Midfield

Club information
- Current club: Gold Coast
- Number: 33

Playing career^{1}
Years	Club	Games (Goals)
2018–2021	Geelong	12 (6)
2022–2023	Gold Coast	4 (0)
Total		16 (6)
- ^{1} Playing statistics correct to the end of 2023.

Career highlights
- AFL Rising Star nominee: 2019; AFL Under 18 All Australian 2017; VFL premiership player: 2023; Sandover Medal: 2025; WAFL Team Of Year: 2025; VFL Team Of the Year: 2021,2023

Charlie Constable (born 18 May 1999) is a former professional Australian rules footballer who played for the Gold Coast Suns and Geelong in the Australian Football League (AFL). He is currently playing in the West Australian Football League (WAFL) with the Perth Football Club.

== Early life ==
Constable played junior football for East Sandringham and Haileybury, before he was selected to play for the Sandringham Dragons in the TAC Cup. He played for Vic Country in 2017 AFL Under 18 Championships where he achieved All-Australian honours. Constable was drafted with pick 36 in the 2017 AFL draft by the Geelong Football Club.

== AFL career ==
After spending the 2018 season in the VFL, Constable made his debut in round 1 of the 2019 AFL season against Collingwood, having 21 disposals and kicking a goal. For his round 2 performance against Melbourne, where he has 31 disposals and a goal, Constable was nominated for the 2019 AFL Rising Star award.

Following the 2021 AFL season, Constable was delisted by Geelong, but subsequently picked up by Gold Coast in the 2021 AFL draft.

Constable announced his retirement from the AFL in October 2023, before joining WAFL club the Perth Demons. In 2025 he was awarded the Sandover Medal as the fairest and best player in the league for the season.

== Statistics ==
Statistics are correct to the end of 2022 AFL season

Legend
G	Goals	K	Kicks	D	Disposals	T	Tackles
B	Behinds	H	Handballs	M	Marks

Season	Team	No.	Games	Totals							Averages (per game)						
Season	Team	No.	Games	G	B	K	H	D	M	T	G	B	K	H	D	M	T
2019	Geelong	18	7	5	2	63	87	150	31	26	0.7	0.3	9.0	12.4	21.4	4.4	3.7
2020 (Note: The 2020 season was played with 17 home-and-away matches per team (down from 22) and 16-minute quarters with time on (down from 20-minute quarters with time on) due to the impact of the COVID-19 pandemic.)	Geelong	18	2	0	1	13	22	35	4	8	0.0	0.5	6.5	11.0	17.5	2.0	4.0
2021	Geelong	18	3	1	0	21	16	37	13	3	0.3	0.0	7.0	5.3	12.3	4.3	1.0
2022	Gold Coast	33	2	0	0	4	0	4	2	0	0.0	0.0	2.0	0.00	1.0	0.0	0
Career			14	6	3	101	125	226	50	37	0.4	0.2	7.2	8.9	16.1	3.6	2.6
