= Judson Clarke =

Australian rules footballer

- Clarke in 2026

Personal information
- Nickname: Juddy
- Born: 17 October 2003 (age 23)
- Original team: Dandenong Stingrays (NAB League)/Yarra Valley Grammar
- Draft: No. 30, 2021 AFL National Draft: Richmond
- Debut: Round 13, 2022, Richmond vs. Port Adelaide, at MCG
- Height: 180 cm (5 ft 11 in)
- Weight: 72 kg (159 lb)
- Position: Half Forward

Club information
- Current club: Richmond
- Number: 23

Playing career^{1}
Years	Club	Games (Goals)
2022–	Richmond	20 (14)
- ^{1} Playing statistics correct to the end of 2026.

Judson Clarke (born 17 October 2003) is a professional Australian rules footballer playing for the Richmond Football Club in the Australian Football League (AFL). Clarke was drafted by Richmond with the 30th pick in the 2021 AFL draft, and made his AFL debut in Round 13 of the 2022 season.

== Early life and junior football ==
Clarke grew up playing for the East Ringwood Football Club through his junior career. Clarke suffered an ACL injury late in the 2019 season and did rehab through 2020 when there was no NAB League Boys season due to Covid. He played for the Dandenong Stingrays in the NAB League and also played school football at Yarra Valley Grammar. In one notable performance for Yarra Valley Grammar, Clarke gathered 51 disposals and kicked 3 goals. Clarke also played for Vic Country where he kicked 5 goals against Vic Metro in a trial match in June 2021.

== AFL career ==
=== 2022 season ===
Clarke was drafted by Richmond with the club's fifth pick and thirtieth selection overall in the 2021 AFL draft. After a promising stint in the VFL, including a four-goal game against Footscray, Clarke was selected and made his debut in Round 13 of the 2022 season against Port Adelaide where he kicked two goals and recorded eleven disposals. He became the 31st player in AFL history to kick goals with his first two kicks.

== Statistics ==
Updated to the end of round 22, 2026.

Legend
G	Goals	K	Kicks	D	Disposals	T	Tackles
B	Behinds	H	Handballs	M	Marks

Season	Team	No.	Games	Totals							Averages (per game)							Votes
Season	Team	No.	Games	G	B	K	H	D	M	T	G	B	K	H	D	M	T	Votes
2022	Richmond	42	3	3	1	16	9	25	9	4	1.0	0.3	5.3	3.0	8.3	3.0	1.3	0
2023	Richmond	42	13	11	3	68	47	115	26	18	0.8	0.2	5.2	3.6	8.8	2.0	1.4	0
2024	Richmond	23	1	0	0	3	1	4	2	0	0.0	0.0	3.0	1.0	4.0	2.0	0.0	0
2025		23	0	—	—	—	—	—	—	—	—	—	—	—	—	—	—	0
2026	Richmond	23	1	0	1	6	7	13	1	1	0.0	1.0	6.0	7.0	13.0	1.0	1.0	0
Career			18	14	5	93	64	157	38	23	0.8	0.3	5.2	3.6	8.7	2.1	1.3	0
