= Daniel Turner (footballer) =

Australian rules footballer

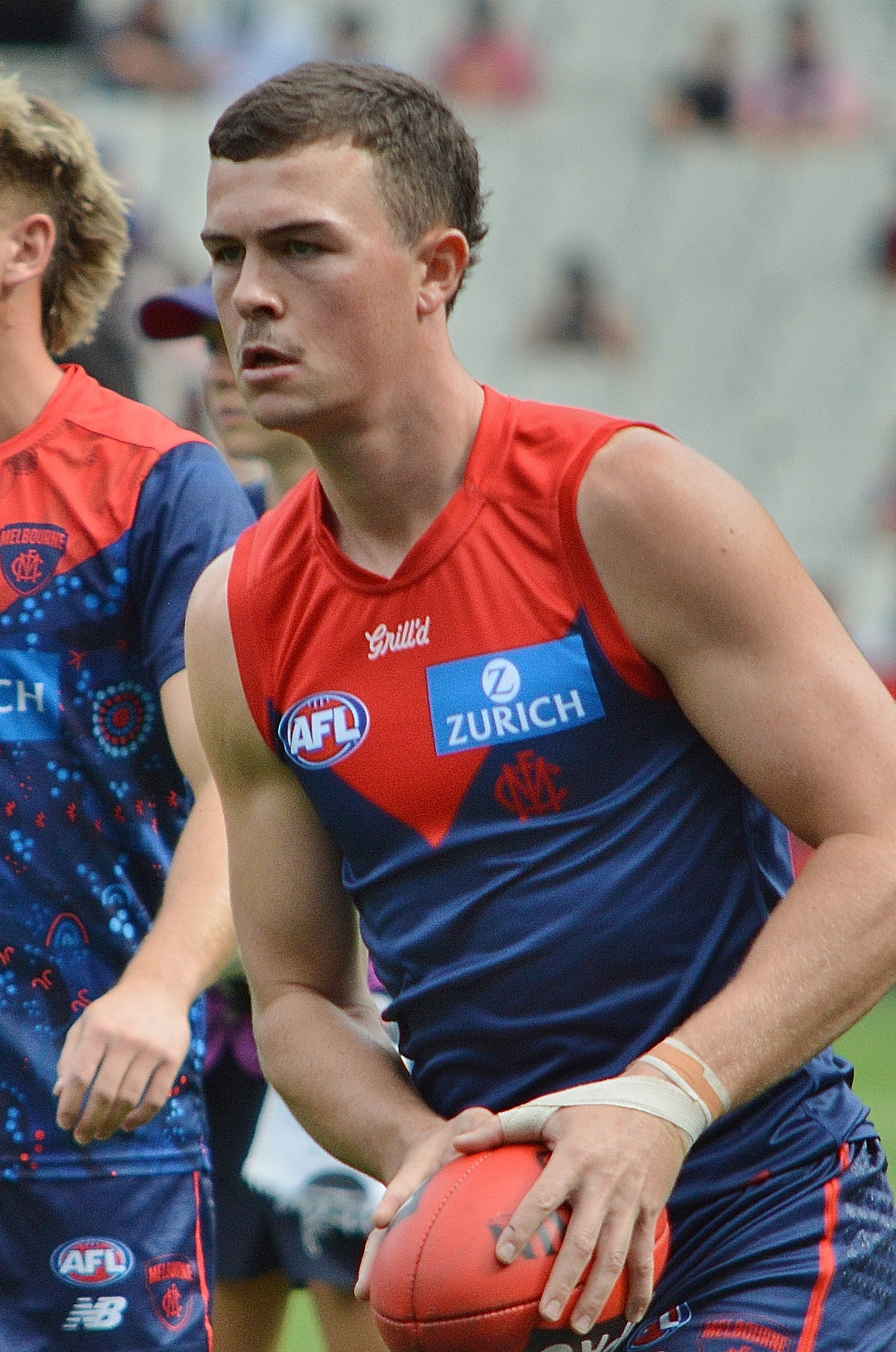
- Turner in April 2025

Personal information
- Nickname: Disco
- Born: 28 January 2002 (age 24)
- Original team: Albury (O&MFNL) /Murray U18 (NAB League)
- Draft: No. 24, 2021 mid-season rookie draft
- Debut: Round 13, 2022, Melbourne vs. Collingwood, at MCG
- Height: 194 cm (6 ft 4 in)
- Weight: 88 kg (194 lb)
- Position: Key Defender

Club information
- Current club: Melbourne
- Number: 10

Playing career^{1}
Years	Club	Games (Goals)
2021–	Melbourne	54 (26)
- ^{1} Playing statistics correct to the end of round 22, 2026.

Career highlights
- VFL premiership player: 2022

Daniel Turner (born 28 January 2002) is a professional Australian rules footballer playing for the Melbourne Football Club in the Australian Football League (AFL). A key defender, he is 1.95 metres (6 ft 5 in) tall and weighs 88 kilograms (194 lb).

== Statistics ==
Updated to the end of round 22, 2026.

Legend
G	Goals	K	Kicks	D	Disposals	T	Tackles
B	Behinds	H	Handballs	M	Marks

Season	Team	No.	Games	Totals							Averages (per game)							Votes
Season	Team	No.	Games	G	B	K	H	D	M	T	G	B	K	H	D	M	T	Votes
2021	Melbourne	42	0	—	—	—	—	—	—	—	—	—	—	—	—	—	—	0
2022 (Note: 2022 statistics include one game in which Turner was substituted out of the game due to injury (round 13).)	Melbourne	42	1	0	0	3	2	5	2	2	0.0	0.0	3.0	2.0	5.0	2.0	2.0	0
2023 (Note: 2023 statistics include one game in which Turner was substituted out of the game (round 8).)	Melbourne	42	2	0	0	17	3	20	7	6	0.0	0.0	8.5	1.5	10.0	3.5	3.0	0
2024	Melbourne	42	15	17	7	79	39	118	59	14	1.1	0.5	5.3	2.6	7.9	3.9	0.9	0
2025	Melbourne	10	19	7	4	170	62	232	117	24	0.4	0.2	8.9	3.3	12.2	6.2	1.3	0
2026	Melbourne	10	17	2	2	166	79	245	105	27	0.1	0.1	9.8	4.6	14.4	6.2	1.6	0
Career			54	26	13	435	185	620	290	73	0.5	0.2	8.1	3.4	11.5	5.4	1.4	0
