= Brady Hough =

Australian rules footballer (born 2003)

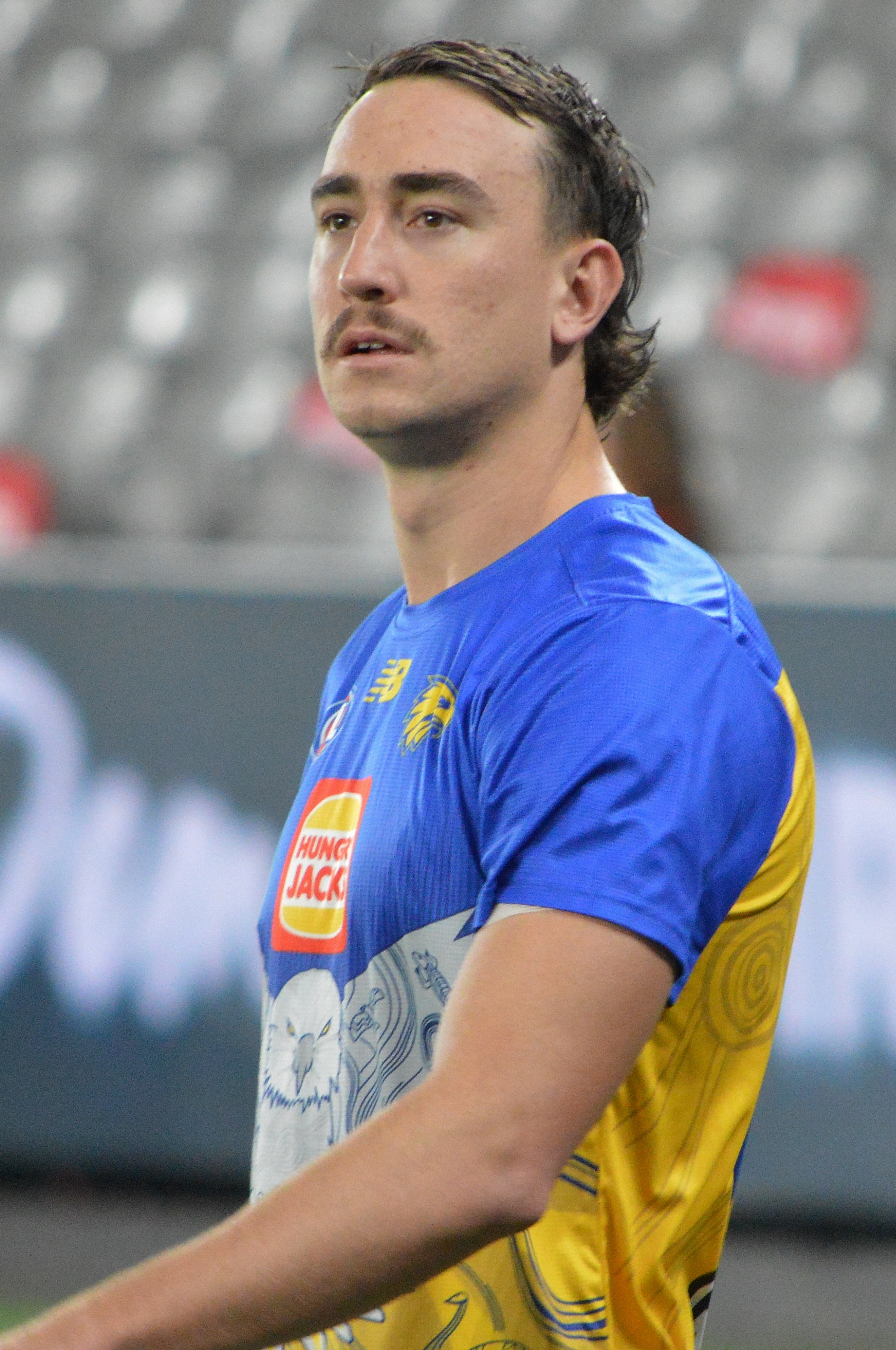
- Hough in May 2026

Personal information
- Full name: Brady Hough
- Born: 5 March 2003 (age 23)
- Original team: Harvey-Brunswick-Leschenault/Peel Thunder
- Draft: No. 31, 2021 national draft
- Height: 191 cm (6 ft 3 in)
- Position: Defender

Club information
- Current club: West Coast
- Number: 19

Playing career^{1}
Years	Club	Games (Goals)
2022-	West Coast	96 (8)
- ^{1} Playing statistics correct to the end of round 22, 2026.

Brady Hough (born 5 March 2003) is a professional Australian rules footballer playing for the West Coast Eagles in the Australian Football League (AFL).

== Early football ==
Originally from the town of Harvey, Western Australia, Hough played junior football for Harvey-Brunswick-Leschenault in the South West Football League. He has previously represented Western Australia three times at under-19s level, and was the Peel Thunder colts best and fairest winner in 2021. He was drafted by West Coast with pick number 31 in the 2021 national draft.

== AFL career ==
He was named to make his debut in Round 1 of the 2022 AFL season against Gold Coast at Optus Stadium, collecting 10 disposals and 3 tackles during the match. He finished his first season at the Eagles having played 15 games, and was awarded the club's Emerging Talent award at the end of the year.

Hough scored his first AFL goal in Round 10 of the 2025 AFL season, against St Kilda in the AFL indigenous round with an impressive snap from 50m out.

== Statistics ==
Updated to the end of round 22, 2026.

Legend
G	Goals	K	Kicks	D	Disposals	T	Tackles
B	Behinds	H	Handballs	M	Marks

Season	Team	No.	Games	Totals							Averages (per game)							Votes
Season	Team	No.	Games	G	B	K	H	D	M	T	G	B	K	H	D	M	T	Votes
2022	West Coast	19	15	0	3	127	59	186	74	14	0.0	0.2	8.5	3.9	12.4	4.9	0.9	0
2023	West Coast	19	15	0	0	138	88	226	85	19	0.0	0.0	9.2	5.9	15.1	5.7	1.3	0
2024	West Coast	19	23	0	1	191	134	325	114	43	0.0	0.0	8.3	5.8	14.1	5.0	1.9	0
2025	West Coast	19	22	3	2	165	175	340	98	72	0.1	0.1	7.5	8.0	15.5	4.5	3.3	2
2026	West Coast	19	21	5	2	143	121	264	96	52	0.2	0.1	6.8	5.8	12.6	4.6	2.5	0
Career			96	8	8	764	577	1341	467	200	0.1	0.1	8.0	6.0	14.0	4.9	2.1	2
