= Josh Sinn =

Australian rules footballer

Personal information
- Full name: Josh Sinn
- Born: 7 January 2003 (age 23)
- Original team: Sandringham Dragons (Talent League)
- Draft: No. 12, 2021 national draft
- Debut: Round 2, 2022, Port Adelaide vs. Hawthorn, at Adelaide Oval
- Height: 187 cm (6 ft 2 in)
- Weight: 82 kg (181 lb)
- Position: Defender

Club information
- Current club: Port Adelaide
- Number: 8

Playing career^{1}
Years	Club	Games (Goals)
2022–	Port Adelaide	30 (1)
- ^{1} Playing statistics correct to the end of the 2025 season.

Josh Sinn (born 7 January 2003) is a professional Australian rules footballer who plays for the Port Adelaide Football Club in the Australian Football League (AFL).

== Early life ==
Sinn was educated at Xavier College in Melbourne, Victoria and played his junior football with the East Brighton Vampires. In 2019, he was a standout in the under-16 All-Australian team. That year, he captained Vic Metro while playing as a damaging half-back.

While at some stages in his junior career he was expected to be a top ten pick in the national draft, and even a contender for the number-one pick, Sinn found himself at pick 12 overall in the 2021 national draft. He was selected by Port Adelaide after they traded their later pick with the West Coast.

== AFL career ==
He made his AFL debut in round 2, 2022 against Hawthorn at Adelaide Oval. Sinn did not feature again in 2022, partially due to groin injuries, but improved on his debut season with three matches in 2023. In 2024, Sinn kicked his first career goal against Brisbane Lions and played in his first final, which was a semi-final against Hawthorn.

Following the departure of two-time All-Australian Dan Houston at the conclusion of the 2024 season, Sinn was tipped as the player to replace Port's star half-back. Playing 20 of a possible 23 games in 2025, Sinn extended his contract with Port Adelaide.

== Personal life ==
Sinn is a twin, brother to his sister Chloe. In 2021, he enrolled at Monash University to study business banking and finance.

== Statistics ==
Updated to the end of the 2025 season.

Legend
G	Goals	K	Kicks	D	Disposals	T	Tackles
B	Behinds	H	Handballs	M	Marks

Season	Team	No.	Games	Totals							Averages (per game)							Votes
Season	Team	No.	Games	G	B	K	H	D	M	T	G	B	K	H	D	M	T	Votes
2022	Port Adelaide	8	1	0	0	5	6	11	3	0	0.0	0.0	5.0	6.0	11.0	3.0	0.0	0
2023	Port Adelaide	8	3	0	1	10	6	16	5	1	0.0	0.3	3.3	2.0	5.3	1.7	0.3	0
2024	Port Adelaide	8	6	1	0	57	18	75	21	8	0.2	0.0	9.5	3.0	12.5	3.5	1.3	0
2025	Port Adelaide	8	20	0	1	172	57	229	63	25	0.0	0.1	8.6	2.9	11.5	3.2	1.3	0
Career			30	1	2	244	87	331	92	34	0.0	0.1	8.1	2.9	11.0	3.1	1.1	0
