= Patrick Parnell =

Australian rules footballer (born 2002)

Personal information
- Born: 4 March 2002 (age 24)
- Original teams: Murray Bushrangers (Talent League); Albury (OMFNL)
- Draft: No. 4, 2021 mid-season rookie draft
- Debut: Round 7, 2022, Adelaide vs. West Coast, at Adelaide Oval
- Height: 178 cm (5 ft 10 in)
- Weight: 76 kg (168 lb)

Playing career
Years	Club	Games (Goals)
2021–2024	Adelaide	17 (0)

Patrick Parnell (born 4 March 2002) is a former Australian rules footballer who played for the Adelaide Football Club in the Australian Football League (AFL).

== Early life ==
As a young man, Parnell played many sports, but eventually chose football over athletics, tennis, and cricket.

Parnell, who comes from Albury in New South Wales, played 122 games with the Murray Bushrangers between 2019 and 2021. He was recruited by Adelaide in the 2021 mid-season rookie draft as a replacement for Tyson Stengle. Parnell was the first-ever mid-season rookie drafted to Adelaide.

== AFL career ==
Parnell made his league debut in 2022 against West Coast, featuring in 11 games during the second half of the season. Parnell was nominated for the 2023 Mark of the Year following a spectacular grab against St Kilda in round 9. It was a career best game for Parnell, who had 25 disposals for 100 AFL Fantasy points.

In his one and only game of 2024, Parnell injured his shoulder against Melbourne, and did not recover for the remainder of the season after requiring a shoulder reconstruction. After 17 games at AFL level, Parnell was informed that Adelaide would not be offering him a contract for 2025. Parnell wore the guernsey number 37, previously worn by Tyson Edwards.

== Statistics ==
Legend
G	Goals	K	Kicks	D	Disposals	T	Tackles
B	Behinds	H	Handballs	M	Marks

Season	Team	No.	Games	Totals							Averages (per game)							Votes
Season	Team	No.	Games	G	B	K	H	D	M	T	G	B	K	H	D	M	T	Votes
2022	Adelaide	37	11	0	1	83	45	128	30	25	0.0	0.1	7.5	4.1	11.6	2.7	2.3	0
2023	Adelaide	37	5	0	0	37	16	53	17	6	0.0	0.0	7.4	3.2	10.6	3.4	1.2	0
2024	Adelaide	37	1	0	0	8	2	10	2	0	0.0	0.0	8.0	2.0	10.0	2.0	0.0	0
Career			17	0	1	128	63	191	49	31	0.0	0.1	7.5	3.7	11.2	2.9	1.8	0
