= Jack Williams (footballer, born 2003) =

Personal information
- Full name: Jack Williams
- Born: 1 December 2003 (age 22)
- Original team: East Fremantle Football Club
- Draft: No. 57, 2021 national draft
- Height: 198 cm (6 ft 6 in)
- Weight: 99 kg (15 st 8 lb)
- Position: Forward / Ruck

Club information
- Current club: West Coast
- Number: 34

Playing career^{1}
Years	Club	Games (Goals)
2022–2026	West Coast	54 (46)
- ^{1} Playing statistics correct to the end of 2026.

Jack Williams (born 1 December 2003) is a former Australian rules footballer who last played for the West Coast Eagles in the Australian Football League (AFL).

== Early life ==
Originally from Victoria, Williams moved to Perth at an early age. He played his junior football at the Rossmoyne Junior Football Club, and later for East Fremantle in the West Australian Football League (WAFL). He represented Western Australia at under-19s level, and was a part of the AFL Academy program. He attended Willetton Senior High School. In his final year of junior football with East Fremantle Colts, he kicked 40 goals in 15 games.

== AFL career ==
Williams was drafted by the West Coast Eagles with pick 57 in the 2021 AFL draft.

He made his AFL debut in round 2 of the 2022 AFL season against North Melbourne.

In round six of the 2025 AFL season, Williams kicked an equal career-high three goals, and collected 15 disposals against Essendon at Optus Stadium. He was named as one of the Eagles best players during the game by the AFL match report.

== Statistics ==
Updated to the end of round 22, 2026.

Legend
G	Goals	K	Kicks	D	Disposals	T	Tackles
B	Behinds	H	Handballs	M	Marks

Season	Team	No.	Games	Totals							Averages (per game)							Votes
Season	Team	No.	Games	G	B	K	H	D	M	T	G	B	K	H	D	M	T	Votes
2022	West Coast	34	1	0	0	1	1	2	0	1	0.0	0.0	1.0	1.0	2.0	0.0	1.0	0
2023	West Coast	34	10	5	4	35	34	69	24	16	0.5	0.4	3.5	3.4	6.9	2.4	1.6	0
2024	West Coast	34	18	16	4	78	71	149	42	40	0.9	0.2	4.3	3.9	8.3	2.3	2.2	0
2025	West Coast	34	13	16	9	61	41	102	43	21	1.2	0.7	4.7	3.2	7.8	3.3	1.6	0
2026	West Coast	34	10	8	6	47	42	89	24	23	0.8	0.6	4.7	4.2	8.9	2.4	2.3	0
Career			52	45	23	222	189	411	133	101	0.9	0.4	4.3	3.6	7.9	2.6	1.9	0
