= Jacob Wehr =

Australian rules footballer

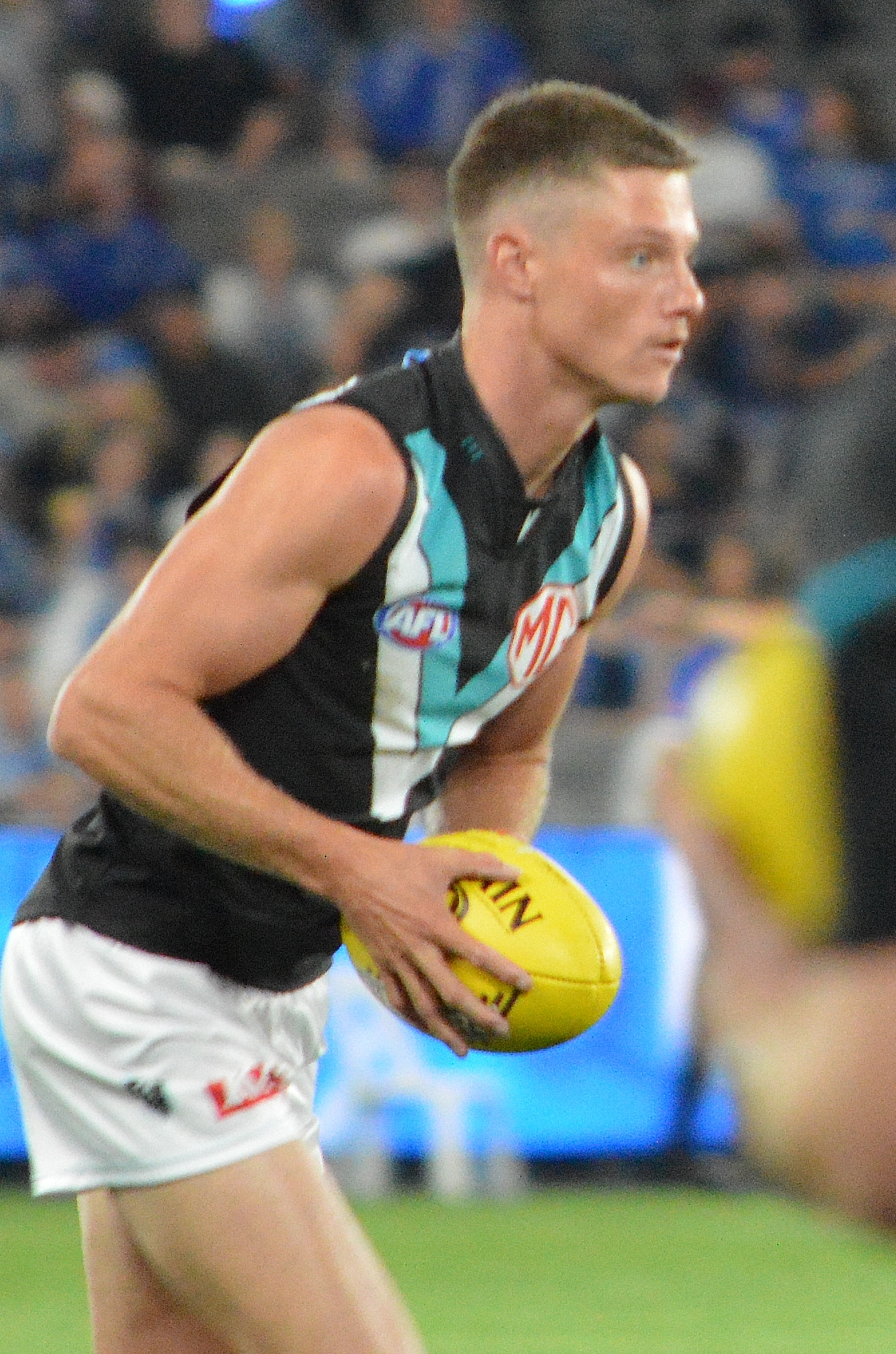
- Wehr playing for Port Adelaide in 2026

Personal information
- Full name: Jacob Wehr
- Born: 5 July 1998 (age 28)
- Original team: Woodville-West Torrens (SANFL)/Balaklava (APFL)
- Draft: No. 59, 2020 AFL national draft
- Debut: Round 10, 2022, Greater Western Sydney vs. West Coast, at Giants Stadium
- Height: 185 cm (6 ft 1 in)
- Weight: 75 kg (165 lb)
- Position: Midfielder

Club information
- Current club: Port Adelaide
- Number: 15

Playing career^{1}
Years	Club	Games (Goals)
2022–2025	Greater Western Sydney	39 (7)
2026–	Port Adelaide	15 (1)
Total		53 (8)
- ^{1} Playing statistics correct to the end of round 22, 2026.

Jacob Wehr (born 5 July 1998) is a professional Australian rules footballer playing for the Port Adelaide Football Club in the Australian Football League (AFL).

== Early career ==
Wehr grew up playing for Balaklava Football Club in the Adelaide Plains Football League (APFL) before moving to South Australian National Football League (SANFL) club Woodville-West Torrens because it was part of their recruiting zone.

Wehr had spent two years playing reserves for Woodville-West Torrens before promotion to the senior side. He played on the wing and was a member of Woodville-West Torrens' 2020 SANFL premiership team.

== AFL career ==
Wehr was recruited by the Greater Western Sydney Giants with pick 59 in 2020 AFL draft as a mature-aged recruit, but failed to play a senior game in his first year. At the end of 2021 he was delisted but stayed at the club via the 2022 rookie draft. He made his AFL debut for the Giants against West Coast in round 10, 2022.

After being flattened by an illegal bump in the first game of 2023, Wehr broke his scapula in the second match. As a result he missed several months of footy.

During the 2025 free agency movement period, Wehr moved to Port Adelaide

== Statistics ==
Updated to the end of round 22, 2026.

Legend
G	Goals	K	Kicks	D	Disposals	T	Tackles
B	Behinds	H	Handballs	M	Marks

Season	Team	No.	Games	Totals							Averages (per game)							Votes
Season	Team	No.	Games	G	B	K	H	D	M	T	G	B	K	H	D	M	T	Votes
2021	Greater Western Sydney	10	0	—	—	—	—	—	—	—	—	—	—	—	—	—	—	0
2022	Greater Western Sydney	10	10	4	0	87	33	120	36	35	0.4	0.0	8.7	3.3	12.0	3.6	3.5	0
2023	Greater Western Sydney	10	4	0	0	13	13	26	7	9	0.0	0.0	3.3	3.3	6.5	1.8	2.3	0
2024	Greater Western Sydney	10	11	0	2	94	59	153	38	21	0.0	0.2	8.5	5.4	13.9	3.5	1.9	0
2025	Greater Western Sydney	10	14	3	1	112	75	187	34	33	0.2	0.1	8.0	5.4	13.4	2.4	2.4	0
2026	Port Adelaide	15	15	1	5	133	54	187	52	34	0.1	0.3	8.9	3.6	12.5	3.5	2.3	0
Career			54	8	8	439	234	673	167	132	0.1	0.1	8.1	4.3	12.5	3.1	2.4	0
