= Jarrod Brander =

Australian rules footballer (born 1999)

Personal information
- Born: 11 February 1999 (age 27)
- Original team: Bendigo Pioneers (TAC Cup)
- Draft: No. 13, 2017 national draft
- Debut: June 15, 2018, West Coast vs. Sydney, at the SCG
- Height: 195 cm (6 ft 5 in)
- Weight: 92 kg (203 lb)
- Position: Mid-Fwd

Playing career^{1}
Years	Club	Games (Goals)
2018–2021	West Coast	22 (5)
2022	Greater Western Sydney	5 (4)
Total		27 (9)
- ^{1} Playing statistics correct to the end of 2022.

Jarrod Brander is a former professional Australian rules footballer for the Greater Western Sydney Giants, having been initially drafted to the West Coast Eagles. Brander made his debut in round 13, 2018 against the Sydney Swans at the SCG.

== Early life ==
Originally from Wentworth in New South Wales, he participated in the Auskick program at Wentworth District in New South Wales.

Brander was part of the GWS Giants Academy as a teenager. He was ruled ineligible to join the Giants as an academy selection because the academy's zones were scaled back. Brander stated he was content with the decision. He played cricket for Geelong Grammar and football for the Bendigo Pioneers.

== AFL career ==
Brander was drafted by West Coast with pick 13 in the 2017 national draft and wore number 10. He played in a practice match against Fremantle at Lathlain Park, earning praise from The West Australian's chief football writer Mark Duffield. Brander was touted as a successor to key forward Josh Kennedy.

Brander was delisted by the Eagles following the 2021 AFL season, but was subsequently signed by Greater Western Sydney as a delisted free agent.

After only one season at the Giants, Brander was delisted on September 23, 2022.
