= Trent Dumont =

Australian rules footballer

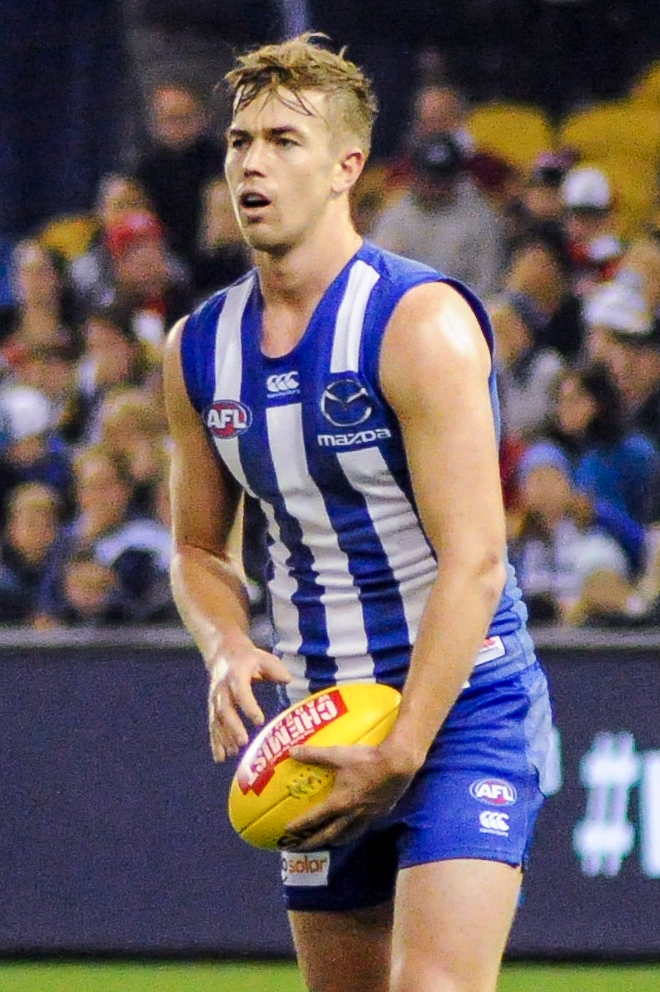
- Dumont playing for North Melbourne in June 2017

Personal information
- Full name: Trent Dumont
- Born: 30 June 1995 (age 31)
- Original team: Norwood (SANFL)
- Draft: No. 30, 2013 National Draft, North Melbourne
- Height: 186 cm (6 ft 1 in)
- Weight: 86 kg (190 lb)
- Position: Midfielder

Playing career^{1}
Years	Club	Games (Goals)
2014–2021	North Melbourne	113 (26)
2022–2023	Port Adelaide	8 (2)
Total		121 (28)
- ^{1} Playing statistics correct to the end of 2023.

Trent Dumont (born 30 June 1995) is a former Australian rules footballer who last played as a defender for Port Adelaide Football Club in the Australian Football League (AFL). Dumont previously played 113 games for North Melbourne. He is cousins with Duke Dumont.

== Early life ==
Dumont participated in the Auskick program at Cranbourne. He went on to play with Norwood in the SANFL.

== AFL career ==
North Melbourne recruited Dumont with the 30th selection in the 2013 National Draft from Norwood in the South Australian National Football League (SANFL). Dumont was one of Norwood's best players in their 2013 SANFL Grand Final premiership winning team.

In 2015, Dumont managed to play a solid 8 games but didn't take part in the side's finals series.

Dumont was able to build on his second AFL season, playing 12 games of the 2016 season and cemented his spot in North's midfield towards the end of the year. Dumont also played in his first ever final against Adelaide in the elimination final at the Adelaide Oval.

During the 2017 season, Dumont signed a two-year deal with North Melbourne after playing 20 senior games in his first 3 seasons. Dumont even stated that he wanted spend his entire career at the club.

In October 2018, Dumont signed a contract extension locking him in at North until at least the end of 2021.

Dumont was delisted by North following the 2021 AFL season, but was re-selected in the rookie draft by Port Adelaide in November 2021.

== Personal life ==
In October 2014, he was charged with one count of aggravated robbery. The alleged victim was a taxi driver called Malusi Hamilton Ketse, and the incident took place in a taxi in Adelaide. He pleaded not guilty and was due to face a trial, scheduled in April 2016. This trial was aborted and rescheduled for January 2017, where prosecution withdrew all charges against him and his co-accused, Joshua Lomas.
