= 2023 West Coast Eagles season =

West Coast Eagles
2023 season
- Coach: Adam Simpson (10th season)
- Captains: Luke Shuey (4th season)
- Home ground: Optus Stadium
- AFL season: Finished 18th (last)
- Leading goalkicker: Oscar Allen
- Highest home attendance: 47,940 vs. Carlton (round 7)
- Lowest home attendance: 36,219 vs. Gold Coast (round 9)

The West Coast Eagles are an Australian rules football team based in Perth, Western Australia. Their 2023 season was their 37th season in the Australian Football League (AFL), their tenth season with Adam Simpson as coach, and their fourth and final season with Luke Shuey as captain. They ended the season with 3 wins and 20 losses, a percentage of 53.0%, and placed 18th (last) to “win” the wooden spoon.

== Background ==
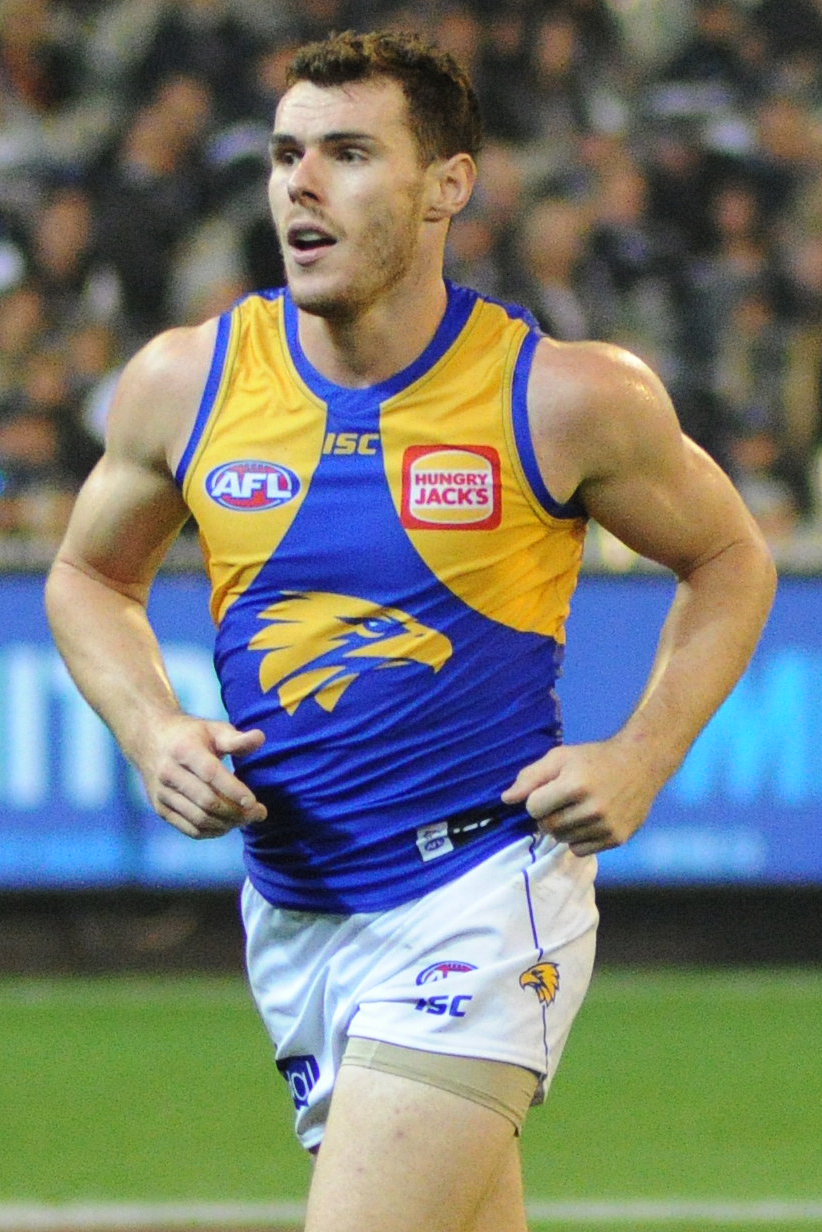
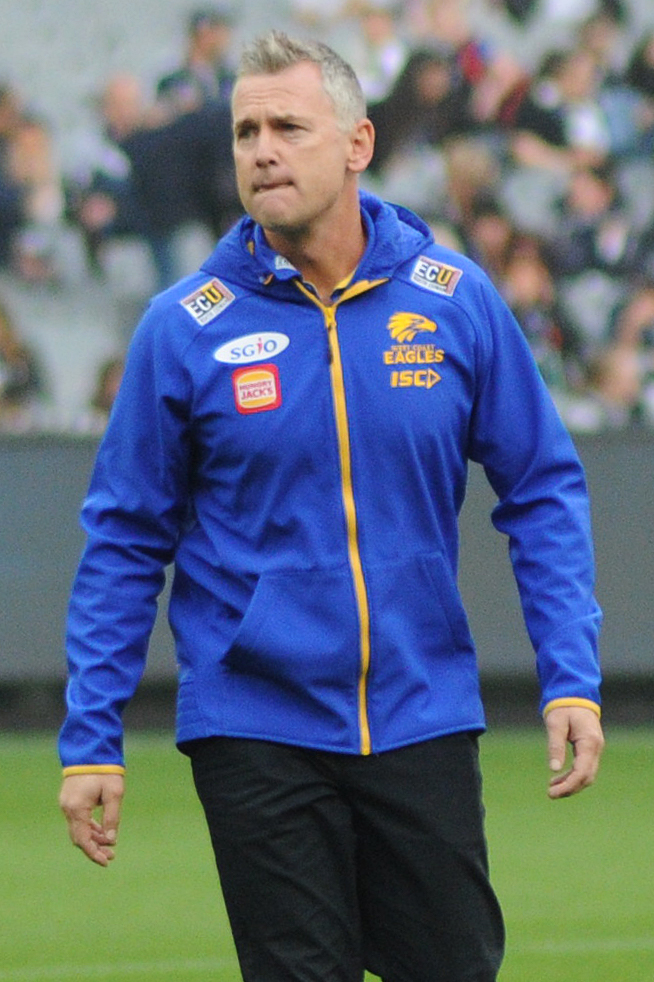
Luke Shuey (captain) and Adam Simpson (coach)

The West Coast Eagles are an Australian rules football team based in Perth, Western Australia, that competes in the Australian Football League (AFL). They ended the 2022 home-and-away season seventeenth, or second last, on the ladder, with only two wins and twenty losses, their worst result ever. They only narrowly avoided winning the wooden spoon because North Melbourne's percentage was worse.

Prior to the start of the 2023 season, West Coast were widely expected to fare similarly to 2022. Out of a group of ten AFL.com.au journalists, all predicted that West Coast would finish the season 13th on the ladder or worse, with four predicting they would finish 16th. None of the journalists predicted that West Coast would finish last however. Fox Sports used a Pythagorean expectation formula to predict that West Coast would finish the season 17th. A group of Western Australia-based people from Nine Entertainment was more optimistic though, predicting West Coast would finish 12th, saying that they were unlucky with injuries in 2022, and that an influx of young players would help them be more competitive.

Luke Shuey was voted in as captain for the fourth consecutive season. Jeremy McGovern remained a vice-captain and was joined by Tom Barrass, who replaced Nic Naitanui who declined to continue as part of the leadership group. Adam Simpson remained as coach for his tenth season. The assistant coaches are Matthew Knights (midfield), Jarrad Schofield (strategy and stoppages), Daniel Pratt (backs) and Luke Webster (forwards). The development coaches are Jacob Brennan (development coordinator), Mark Nicoski (forwards) and Kyal Horsley (midfield).

Jayden Hunt joined West Coast as an unrestricted free agent on the first day of the 2022 trade period. He had previously played 114 games for Melbourne.

== Playing list ==
=== Changes ===
Josh Kennedy retired at the end of the 2022 season, as was widely expected. Jack Redden also retired at the end of the season, albeit unexpectedly.

Removals from playing list
Player	Reason	Games	Ref.
Josh Kennedy	Retired	293 (271 at West Coast)	
Jack Redden	Retired	263 (234 at West Coast)	

Additions to playing list
Player	Acquired	Former club	Former league	Ref.
Jayden Hunt	Unrestricted free agent	Melbourne	AFL	

=== Statistics ===
Playing list and statistics (as of round 9)
Player	No.	Games	Goals	Behinds	Kicks	Handballs	Disposals	Marks	Tackles	Notes/Milestone(s)
Liam Ryan	1	3	4	1	30	9	39	15	11	
Jake Waterman	2	8	10	8	78	35	113	46	18	
Andrew Gaff	3	9	0	2	94	101	195	32	31	
Dom Sheed	4	5	1	1	54	69	123	20	16	
Jayden Hunt	5	9	4	3	116	52	168	43	22	
Elliot Yeo	6	2	0	0	18	6	24	5	3	
Reuben Ginbey	7	9	1	1	45	80	125	11	70	
Elijah Hewett	8	3	0	2	11	14	25	5	1	
Sam Petrevski-Seton	10	6	2	0	48	28	76	21	18	
Tim Kelly	11	9	5	3	110	151	261	31	47	
Oscar Allen	12	9	24	11	71	28	99	50	16	
Luke Shuey	13	4	1	2	37	36	73	7	17	
Liam Duggan	14	9	0	0	137	57	194	61	27	
Jamie Cripps	15	3	4	5	15	20	35	12	5	
Luke Edwards	16	6	0	0	38	41	79	16	20	
Campbell Chesser	18	3	0	2	15	8	23	8	7	
Brady Hough	19	3	0	0	16	8	24	6	7	
Jeremy McGovern	20	3	0	0	36	17	53	22	1	
Jack Petruccelle	21	6	4	1	33	26	59	8	18	
Alex Witherden	23	8	1	0	96	47	143	31	17	
Xavier O'Neill	24	5	2	3	31	29	60	10	24	
Shannon Hurn	25	6	0	0	89	37	126	23	11	
Zane Trew	26	2	0	0	5	13	18	1	5	
Jack Darling	27	9	10	12	54	30	84	34	21	
Tom Cole	28	4	0	0	32	32	64	19	10	
Luke Foley	29	4	0	0	28	22	50	13	6	
Jamaine Jones	31	9	2	2	104	69	173	31	22	
Bailey Williams	32	9	1	0	49	64	113	10	28	
Rhett Bazzo	33	2	0	0	3	6	9	2	0	
Josh Rotham	35	6	0	0	41	9	50	24	7	
Connor West	36	6	3	3	29	39	68	12	12	
Tom Barrass	37	9	0	0	74	42	116	57	4	
Greg Clark	39	6	1	2	38	52	90	19	18	
Callum Jamieson	40	2	0	0	5	3	8	3	1	
Harry Edwards	42	1	0	0	4	2	6	3	1	
Noah Long	44	5	2	2	23	36	59	10	13	
Jai Culley	49	5	5	2	14	28	42	8	15	

== Season summary ==
In the 2023 AFL season, each team played 23 games and had a mid-season bye. West Coast played North Melbourne, Fremantle, Carlton, Richmond, Essendon, and Adelaide twice, and all the other teams once. Only one game was played at the Melbourne Cricket Ground, the venue of the grand final, against Richmond. There were three games at Adelaide Oval as a result of the Gather Round, where West Coast played Geelong in Adelaide. Other venues included four games at Docklands Stadium in Melbourne, one game at The Gabba in Brisbane, one game at the Sydney Cricket Ground, and one game against Hawthorn at University of Tasmania Stadium in Launceston, Tasmania.

=== Results ===
Regular season results
Round	Day	Date	Result	Score			Opponent	Score			Ground		Attendance	Ladder	Margin	Ref.
Round	Day	Date	Result	G	B	T	Opponent	G	B	T	Ground		Attendance	Ladder	Margin	Ref.
1	Saturday	18 March	Lost	12	10	82	North Melbourne	12	15	87	Marvel Stadium	A	21,274	11th	-5	
2	Sunday	26 March	Won	14	16	100	Greater Western Sydney	11	15	81	Optus Stadium	H	44,649	9th	+19	
3	Sunday	2 April	Lost	9	13	67	Fremantle	16	12	108	Optus Stadium	A	56,090	12th	-41	
4	Sunday	9 April	Lost	9	9	63	Melbourne	19	12	126	Optus Stadium	H	42,458	16th	-63	
5	Sunday	16 April	Lost	13	11	89	Geelong	21	10	136	Adelaide Oval	N	30,120	17th	-47	
6	Saturday	22 April	Lost	10	9	69	Port Adelaide	16	13	109	Adelaide Oval	A	31,638	17th	-40	
7	Sunday	29 April	Lost	6	8	44	Carlton	23	14	152	Optus Stadium	H	47,940	18th	-108	
8	Saturday	6 May	Lost	8	10	58	Richmond	15	14	104	Melbourne Cricket Ground	A	28,293	17th	-46	
9	Friday	12 May	Lost	6	7	43	Gold Coast	16	17	113	Optus Stadium	H	36,219	18th	-70	
10	Sunday	21 May	Lost	4	2	26	Hawthorn	22	10	142	University of Tasmania Stadium	A		18th	-116	
11	Saturday	27 May	Lost	6	10	46	Essendon	14	12	96	Optus Stadium	H		18th	-50	
12	Saturday	3 June	Lost	8	9	57	Collingwood	18	12	120	Optus Stadium	H		18th	-63	
13	Saturday	10 June	Lost	8	4	52	Adelaide	27	12	174	Adelaide Oval	A		18th	-122	
14							Bye									
15	Saturday	24 June	Lost	5	4	34	Sydney	31	19	205	Sydney Cricket Ground	A		18th	-171	
16	Sunday	2 July	Lost	12	5	77	St Kilda	12	13	85	Optus Stadium	H		18th	-8	
17	Saturday	8 July	Lost	5	5	35	Brisbane Lions	16	20	116	The Gabba	A		18th	-81	
18	Sunday	16 July	Lost	8	12	60	Richmond	14	14	98	Optus Stadium	H		18th	-38	
19	Saturday	22 July	Lost	10	9	69	Carlton	21	14	140	Marvel Stadium	A		18th	-71	
20	Sunday	30 July	Won	10	12	72	North Melbourne	10	7	67	Optus Stadium	H		18th	+5	
21	Saturday	5 August	Lost	11	6	72	Essendon	10	13	73	Marvel Stadium	A		18th	-1	
22	Saturday	12 August	Lost	4	9	33	Fremantle	20	14	134	Optus Stadium	H		18th	-101	
23	Sunday	20 August	Won	14	8	92	Western Bulldogs	12	13	85	Marvel Stadium	A		17th	+7	
24	Saturday	26 August	Lost	12	6	78	Adelaide	17	21	123	Optus Stadium	H		18th	-45	

Key
H	Home game
A	Away game
N	Neutral game

=== Ladder ===
Pos	Team	Pld	W	L	D	PF	PA	PP	Pts	Qualification
1	Collingwood (P)	23	18	5	0	2142	1687	127.0	72	Finals series
2	Brisbane Lions	23	17	6	0	2180	1771	123.1	68	Finals series
3	Port Adelaide	23	17	6	0	2149	1906	112.7	68	Finals series
4	Melbourne	23	16	7	0	2079	1660	125.2	64	Finals series
5	Carlton	23	13	9	1	1922	1697	113.3	54	Finals series
6	St Kilda	23	13	10	0	1775	1647	107.8	52	Finals series
7	Greater Western Sydney	23	13	10	0	2018	1885	107.1	52	Finals series
8	Sydney	23	12	10	1	2050	1863	110.0	50	Finals series
9	Western Bulldogs	23	12	11	0	1919	1766	108.7	48	
10	Adelaide	23	11	12	0	2193	1877	116.8	44	
11	Essendon	23	11	12	0	1838	2050	89.7	44	
12	Geelong	23	10	12	1	2088	1855	112.6	42	
13	Richmond	23	10	12	1	1856	1983	93.6	42	
14	Fremantle	23	10	13	0	1835	1898	96.7	40	
15	Gold Coast	23	9	14	0	1839	2006	91.7	36	
16	Hawthorn	23	7	16	0	1686	2101	80.2	28	
17	North Melbourne	23	3	20	0	1657	2318	71.5	12	
18	West Coast	23	3	20	0	1418	2674	53.0	12	

Source: afl.com.au
Rules for classification: 1) points; 2) percentage; 3) number of points for
(P) Premiers

== WAFL team ==
Robert Wiley was West Coast's WAFL coach.

== Awards ==
Reuben Ginbey was nominated for the Rising Star award in round three, making him the first Rising Star nomination from West Coast since Oscar Allen in round 21, 2019. Jai Culley was nominated for the Rising Star award in round six.

Awards received by West Coast players
Award	Awarded by	Player	Result	Ref.
Rising Star	Australian Football League	Reuben Ginbey (round 3)	Nominated	
Rising Star	Australian Football League	Jai Culley (round 6)	Nominated	
