= 2025 West Coast Eagles season =

39th season of the West Coast Eagles

West Coast Eagles
2025 season
- Coach: Andrew McQualter (1st season)
- Captains: Oscar Allen and Liam Duggan (1st season)
- Home ground: Optus Stadium

The 2025 West Coast Eagles season is the 39th season of the West Coast Eagles playing the Australian Football League (AFL).

It is West Coast's first season with Andrew McQualter as coach, and first season with Oscar Allen and Liam Duggan as co-captains.

== Overview ==
West Coast's 2025 season overview
Team	Captain(s)	Coach	Home ground	W–L–D	Ladder	Finals	Best and fairest	Leading goalkicker	Refs
AFL	Oscar Allen and Liam Duggan	Andrew McQualter	Optus Stadium	TBD	TBD	TBD	TBD	TBD	

== AFL ==
=== Playing squad ===
Players are listed by guernsey number. Statistics are from Eagles Archive URL

No.	Name	AFL debut	Games (2025)	Goals (2025)	Games (WCE)	Goals (WCE)	Games (AFL career)	Goals (AFL career)
1	Liam Ryan	2018	0	0	105	136	105	136
2	Jake Waterman	2017	0	0	104	132	104	132
3	Liam Baker	2018 (Richmond)	0	0	0	0	128	54
4	Dom Sheed	2014	0	0	165	69	165	69
5	Jayden Hunt	2014 (Melbourne)	0	0	40	10	154	53
6	Elliot Yeo	2012 (Brisbane Lions)	0	0	185	84	212	85
7	Reuben Ginbey	2023	0	0	40	2	40	2
8	Elijah Hewett	2023	0	0	14	4	14	4
9	Harley Reid	2024	0	0	20	10	20	10
10	Tyler Brockman	2021 (Hawthorn)	0	0	10	1	36	24
11	Tim Kelly	2018 (Geelong)	0	0	96	31	144	79
12	Oscar Allen	2018	0	0	93	139	93	139
13	Noah Long	2023	0	0	26	9	26	9
14	Liam Duggan	2015	0	0	176	15	176	15
15	Jamie Cripps	2011 (St Kilda)	0	0	235	295	251	311
16	Matthew Owies	2019 (Carlton)	0	0	0	0	72	89
17	Jack Graham	2017 (Richmond)	0	0	0	0	131	51
18	Campbell Chesser	2023	0	0	32	5	32	5
19	Brady Hough	2022	0	0	53	0	53	0
20	Jeremy McGovern	2011	0	0	191	38	191	38
21	Jack Petruccelle	2018	0	0	86	69	86	69
22	Archer Reid	2024	0	0	0	0	0	0
23	Ryan Maric	2023	0	0	27	16	27	16
24	Harvey Johnston	2024	0	0	6	0	6	0
25	Matt Flynn	2016 (Greater Western Sydney)	0	0	4	1	37	11
26	Bo Allan	2025	0	0	0	0	0	0
27	Tom Gross	2025	0	0	0	0	0	0

=== Playing squad changes ===
==== Additions ====
No.	Name	Position	Previous club	via
3	(Victoria (state)) Liam Baker	Midfielder	Richmond	trade
16	(Victoria (state)) Matthew Owies	Forward	Carlton	trade
17	(Victoria (state)) Jack Graham	Midfielder	Richmond	delisted free agent
26	(Western Australia) Bo Allan	Midfielder	Peel Thunder	AFL national draft, first round (pick No. 16)
27	(Victoria (state)) Tom Gross	Midfielder	Chargers	AFL national draft, third round (pick No. 46)

=== Pre-season matches ===
Date and local time	Opponent	**Scores** (West Coast's scores indicated in **bold**)			Venue	Attendance	Ref.
Date and local time	Opponent	Home	Away	Result	Venue	Attendance	Ref.
Monday, 17 February (9:30 am)	Richmond	**10.2 (62)**	4.2 (26)	Won by 36 points	Mineral Resources Park	–	
Saturday, 1 March (3:10 pm)	North Melbourne	**11.5 (71)**	9.15 (69)	Won by 2 points	Hands Oval	–	

=== Home-and-away season ===
Rd	Date and local time	Opponent	**Scores** (West Coast's scores indicated in **bold**)			Venue	Attendance	Position	Ref.
Rd	Date and local time	Opponent	Home	Away	Result	Venue	Attendance	Position	Ref.
OR	Bye							17th	
1	Sunday, 16 March (3:10 pm)	Gold Coast	**7.7 (49)**	20.16 (136)	Lost by 87 points	Optus Stadium	46,532	17th	
2	Sunday, 23 March (12:10 pm)	Brisbane Lions	14.10 (94)	**11.9 (75)**	Lost by 19 points	The Gabba	30,012	18th ▼	
3	Sunday, 30 March (3:10 pm)	Fremantle	**10.8 (68)**	15.16 (106)	Lost by 38 points	Optus Stadium	53,289	18th	
4	Sunday, 6 April (1:10 pm)	Greater Western Sydney	20.12 (132)	**7.9 (51)**	Lost by 81 points	Engie Stadium	9,231	18th	
5	Saturday, 12 April (12:50 pm)	Carlton	17.19 (121)	**6.14 (50)**	Lost by 71 points	Adelaide Oval	41,252	18th	
6	Friday, 18 April (4:10 pm)	Essendon	**11.9 (75)**	11.11 (77)	Lost by 2 points	Optus Stadium	46,080	18th	
7	Sunday, 27 April (4:40 pm)	Hawthorn	18.16 (124)	**11.8 (74)**	Lost by 50 points	Marvel Stadium	26,425	18th	
8	Saturday, 3 May (5:35 pm)	Melbourne	**11.10 (76)**	16.12 (108)	Lost by 32 points	Optus Stadium	41,991	18th	
9	Sunday, 11 May (1:10 pm)	Richmond	11.15 (81)	**11.13** **(79)**	Lost by 2 points	Melbourne Cricket Ground	29,539	18th	
10	Sunday, 18 May (2:40 pm)	St Kilda	**16.12** **(108)**	12.8 (80)	Won by 28 points	Optus Stadium	42,860	18th	
11	Sunday, 25 May (1:10 pm)	Adelaide				Adelaide Oval		18th	
12	Sunday, 1 June (5:20 pm)	Geelong				Optus Stadium			
13	Sunday, 8 June (1:20 pm)	North Melbourne				Hands Oval			
14	Sunday, 15 June (4:10 pm)	Carlton				Optus Stadium			
15	Bye								
16	TBC	Collingwood				Marvel Stadium			
17	TBC	Greater Western Sydney				Optus Stadium			

=== Ladder ===
Pos	Team	Pld	W	L	D	PF	PA	PP	Pts	Qualification
1	Adelaide	23	18	5	0	2278	1635	139.3	72	Finals series
2	Geelong	23	17	6	0	2425	1714	141.5	68	Finals series
3	Brisbane Lions (P)	23	16	6	1	2061	1804	114.2	66	Finals series
4	Collingwood	23	16	7	0	1991	1627	122.4	64	Finals series
5	Greater Western Sydney	23	16	7	0	2114	1834	115.3	64	Finals series
6	Fremantle	23	16	7	0	1978	1815	109.0	64	Finals series
7	Gold Coast	23	15	8	0	2173	1740	124.9	60	Finals series
8	Hawthorn	23	15	8	0	2045	1691	120.9	60	Finals series
9	Western Bulldogs	23	14	9	0	2493	1820	137.0	56	
10	Sydney	23	12	11	0	1845	1902	97.0	48	
11	Carlton	23	9	14	0	1799	1861	96.7	36	
12	St Kilda	23	9	14	0	1839	2077	88.5	36	
13	Port Adelaide	23	9	14	0	1705	2136	79.8	36	
14	Melbourne	23	7	16	0	1902	2038	93.3	28	
15	Essendon	23	6	17	0	1535	2209	69.5	24	
16	North Melbourne	23	5	17	1	1805	2365	76.3	22	
17	Richmond	23	5	18	0	1449	2197	66.0	20	
**18**	West Coast	**23**	**1**	**22**	**0**	**1466**	**2438**	**60.1**	4	

Source: afl.com.au
Rules for classification: 1) points; 2) percentage; 3) number of points for
(P) Premiers

== WAFL ==
In what was described as the "upset of the season", West Coast's first victory of the 2025 season came in round 5, when it defeated previously-unbeaten South Fremantle by 16 points.

=== Home-and-away season ===
Rd	Date and local time	Opponent	**Scores** (West Coast's scores indicated in **bold**)			Venue	Attendance	Position	Ref.
Rd	Date and local time	Opponent	Home	Away	Result	Venue	Attendance	Position	Ref.
1	Saturday, 5 April (2:30 pm)	East Fremantle	20.11 (131)	**12.10 (82)**	Lost by 49 points	The Good Grocer Park		9th	
2	Friday, 11 April (6:40 pm)	Subiaco	**9.19 (73)**	13.14 (92)	Lost by 19 points	Mineral Resources Park		9th	
3	Saturday, 19 April (2:30 pm)	Perth	15.9 (99)	**9.9 (63)**	Lost by 36 points	Mineral Resources Park	1,903	9th	
4	Friday, 25 April (1:40 pm)	Claremont	19.10 (124)	**10.12 (72)**	Lost by 52 points	Revo Fitness Stadium		9th	
5	Saturday, 3 May (1:40 pm)	South Fremantle	9.12 (66)	**12.10 (82)**	Won by 16 points	Fremantle Community Bank Oval		9th	
6	Saturday, 10 May (11:10 am)	East Perth				Mineral Resources Park			
7	Saturday, 24 May (4:30 pm)	West Perth				Arena Joondalup			
8	Saturday, 31 May (2:30 pm)	Swan Districts				Steel Blue Oval			

=== Ladder ===
Pos	Team	Pld	W	L	D	PF	PA	PP	Pts	Qualification
1	South Fremantle (P)	18	17	1	0	1596	930	171.6	68	Finals series
2	Claremont	18	14	3	1	1515	1035	146.4	58	Finals series
3	East Perth	18	11	7	0	1468	1143	128.4	44	Finals series
4	East Fremantle	18	11	7	0	1482	1292	114.7	44	Finals series
5	Perth	18	11	7	0	1317	1305	100.9	44	Finals series
6	Peel Thunder	18	7	10	1	1140	1248	91.3	30	
7	West Perth	18	6	12	0	1328	1492	89.0	24	
8	Swan Districts	18	6	12	0	1103	1314	83.9	24	
9	Subiaco	18	4	14	0	1002	1578	63.5	16	
**10**	West Coast (R)	**18**	**2**	**16**	**0**	**1134**	**1748**	**64.9**	8	

Source: WAFL.com.au
Rules for classification: 1) points; 2) percentage; 3) number of points for.
(P) Premiers
