= List of AFL debuts in 2023 =

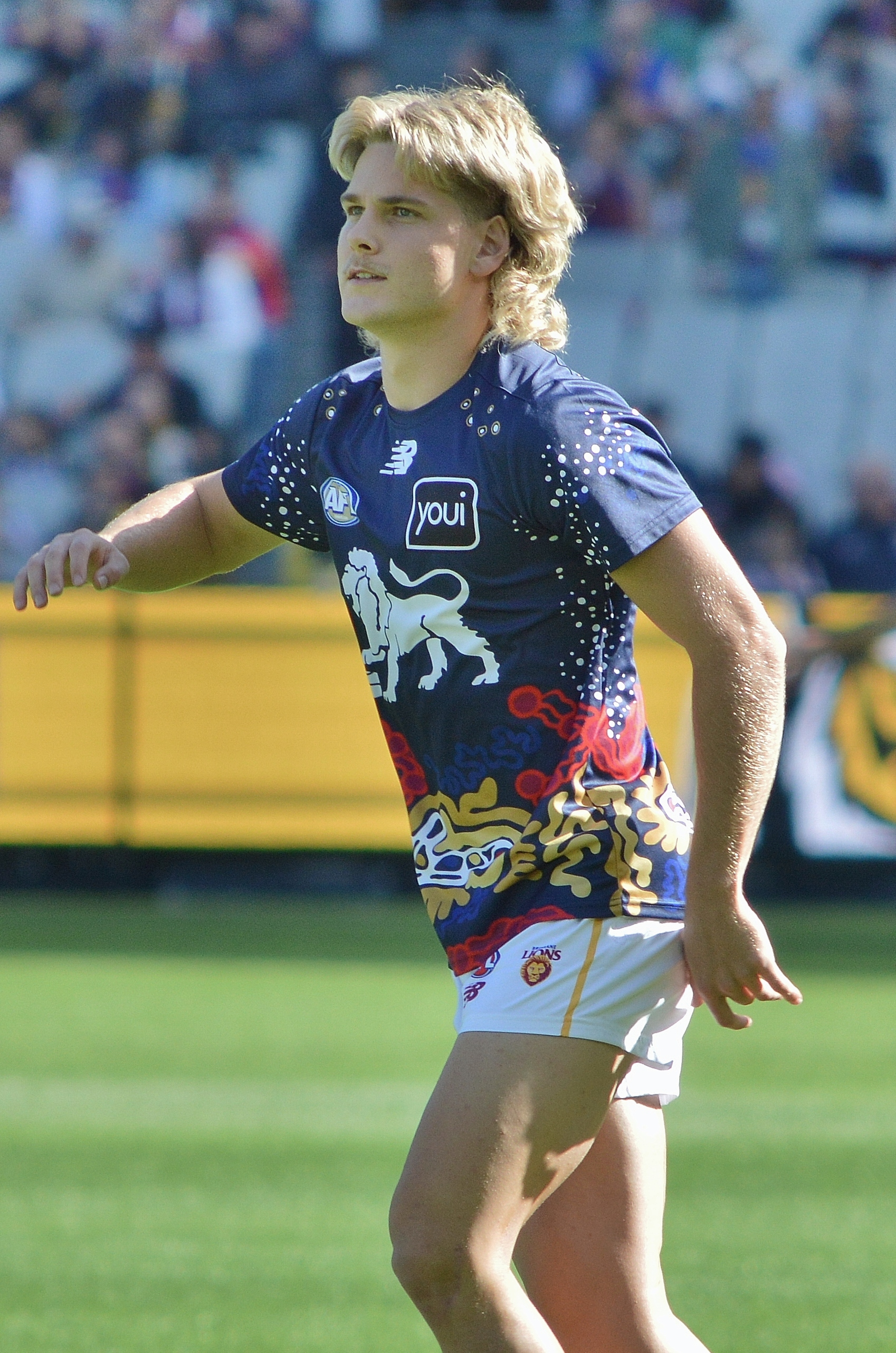
Brisbane Lions' Will Ashcroft made his debut in round one, 2023.

This is a list of players in the Australian Football League (AFL) who have either made their AFL debut or played for a new club during the 2023 AFL season.

== Summary ==
Summary of debuts in 2023
Club	AFL debuts	Change of club
Adelaide	3	3
Brisbane Lions	2	4
Carlton	3	1
Collingwood	2	5
Essendon	2	2
Fremantle	4	4
Geelong	5	3
Gold Coast	4	2
Greater Western Sydney	5	1
Hawthorn	7	3
Melbourne	4	3
North Melbourne	5	4
Port Adelaide	2	4
Richmond	6	2
St Kilda	3	2
Sydney	5	1
West Coast	6	1
Western Bulldogs	2	3
Total	70	48

== AFL debuts ==
Name	Club	Age at debut	Debut round	Games (in 2023)	Goals (in 2023)	Notes
Lachlan Cowan	Carlton	18 years, 105 days	1	7		Pick 30, 2022 national draft
Oliver Hollands	Carlton	19 years, 59 days	1	19	2	Pick 11, 2022 national draft
Harry Sheezel	North Melbourne	18 years, 156 days	1	23	3	Pick 3, 2022 national draft
Reuben Ginbey	West Coast	18 years, 189 days	1	17	1	Pick 9, 2022 national draft
Campbell Chesser	West Coast	19 years, 325 days	1	14		Pick 14, 2021 national draft
Noah Long	West Coast	18 years, 207 days	1	19	7	Pick 58, 2022 national draft
Will Ashcroft	Brisbane Lions	18 years, 316 days	1	18	8	Pick 2, 2022 national draft
Bailey Laurie	Melbourne	20 years, 359 days	1	5		Pick 22, 2020 national draft
Judd McVee	Melbourne	19 years, 223 days	1	25		pick 16, 2022 rookie draft
Bodhi Uwland	Gold Coast	19 years, 236 days	1	3		pick 26, 2022 rookie draft
Max Michalanney	Adelaide	19 years, 21 days	1	22		Pick 17, 2022 national draft
Alwyn Davey	Essendon	19 years, 21 days	1	10	4	Pick 45, 2022 national draft
Cam Mackenzie	Hawthorn	19 years, 57 days	1	14	3	Pick 7, 2022 national draft
Anthony Caminiti	St Kilda	19 years, 100 days	1	18	19	2023 Pre-season supplemental selection
Mattaes Phillipou	St Kilda	18 years, 82 days	1	24	13	Pick 10, 2022 national draft
Cooper Whyte	Geelong	20 years, 27 days	2	1		Pick 64, 2021 national draft
Tylar Young	Richmond	24 years, 201 days	2	19		Pick 26, 2022 Rookie draft
Harry Rowston	Greater Western Sydney	18 years, 226 days	2	7	1	Pick 16, 2022 national draft
Elijah Hewett	West Coast	18 years, 303 days	2	14	4	Pick 14, 2022 national draft
Arthur Jones	Western Bulldogs	19 years, 255 days	3	13	4	Pick 43, 2021 national draft
Matthew Johnson	Fremantle	20 years, 17 days	3	18	4	Pick 21, 2021 national draft
Jacob van Rooyen	Melbourne	19 years, 346 days	3	20	28	Pick 19, 2021 national draft
Bailey Humphrey	Gold Coast	18 years, 209 days	4	19	11	Pick 6, 2022 national draft
Ned Moyle	Gold Coast	21 years, 52 days	4	2		Pick 5, 2021 Mid-Season draft
Will Gould	Sydney	22 years, 90 days	5	4		Pick 26, 2019 national draft
Corey Warner	Sydney	19 years, 189 days	5	3	1	Pick 40, 2021 national draft
Seamus Mitchell	Hawthorn	20 years, 287 days	5	14		pick 6, 2023 rookie draft
Aaron Cadman	Greater Western Sydney	19 years, 44 days	5	12	6	Pick 1, 2022 national draft
Ollie Lord	Port Adelaide	21 years, 110 days	6	13	15	Pick 49, 2020 national draft
Alex Cincotta	Carlton	26 years, 127 days	6	19	3	2023 Pre-season supplemental selection
Marc Sheather	Sydney	20 years, 322 days	7	3	1	2020 Category B rookie selection
Josh Weddle	Hawthorn	18 years, 339 days	7	17	4	Pick 18, 2022 national draft
Max Ramsden	Hawthorn	20 years, 10 days	7	2		Pick 6, 2022 Mid-Season draft
Blake Drury	North Melbourne	19 years, 116 days	8	4		pick 1, 2023 rookie draft
Jhye Clark	Geelong	18 years, 293 days	9	1		Pick 8, 2022 national draft
James O'Donnell	Western Bulldogs	20 years, 255 days	9	12	1	2022 Category B rookie selection
Cameron Fleeton	Greater Western Sydney	20 years, 331 days	9	2		Pick 49, 2020 national draft
George Wardlaw	North Melbourne	18 years, 343 days	10	8	1	Pick 4, 2022 national draft
Lachlan McAndrew	Sydney	22 years, 359 days	10	2		Pick 12, 2020 Mid-Season draft
Oisín Mullin	Geelong	23 years, 105 days	11	6		2022 International selection
Josh Fahey	Greater Western Sydney	19 years, 197 days	11	7	4	Pick 42, 2021 national draft
Bailey Macdonald	Hawthorn	18 years, 303 days	12	2		Pick 51, 2022 national draft
Harvey Harrison	Collingwood	19 years, 205 days	12	4	3	Pick 52, 2021 national draft
Ryan Maric	West Coast	18 years, 277 days	13	10	9	Pick 1, 2023 Mid-Season draft
Jack Buller	Sydney	22 years, 31 days	14	1		Pick 15, 2023 Mid-Season draft
Jaspa Fletcher	Brisbane Lions	19 years, 112 days	14	14	8	Pick 12, 2022 national draft
Dante Visentini	Port Adelaide	20 years, 138 days	16	3		Pick 56, 2021 national draft
Harry Barnett	West Coast	19 years, 161 days	16	1		Pick 23, 2022 national draft
Sam Banks	Richmond	20 years, 95 days	17	6	1	Pick 29, 2021 national draft
Jacob Bauer	Richmond	21 years, 32 days	17	4	4	Pick 10, 2022 Mid-Season draft
Taj Woewodin	Melbourne	20 years, 104 days	17	4	2	Pick 65, 2021 national draft
Cooper Harvey	North Melbourne	18 years, 362 days	17	3	1	Pick 56, 2022 national draft
Karl Worner	Fremantle	21 years, 23 days	17	4		pick 8, 2022 rookie draft
Jack Peris	St Kilda	19 years, 210 days	18	1		2021 Next Generation Academy selection
Matt Coulthard	Richmond	22 years, 72 days	19	4	1	Pick 4, 2023 Mid-Season draft
Ethan Stanley	Fremantle	19 years, 251 days	19	2		Pick 8, 2023 Mid-Season draft
Luke Nankervis	Adelaide	20 years, 59 days	19	4		Pick 4, 2022 pre-season draft
Brandon Ryan	Hawthorn	25 years, 265 days	20	3	4	Pick 12, 2023 Mid-Season draft
Rob Hansen	North Melbourne	19 years, 139 days	20	2		Pick 2, 2023 Mid-Season draft
James Borlase	Adelaide	21 years, 18 days	21	4		2020 Next Generation Academy selection
Elijah Tsatas	Essendon	18 years, 291 days	21	4	1	Pick 5, 2022 national draft
Toby McMullin	Greater Western Sydney	19 years, 7 days	22	3	1	Pick 34, 2022 national draft
Jakob Ryan	Collingwood	18 years, 332 days	23	1		Pick 28, 2022 national draft
Lloyd Johnston	Gold Coast	18 years, 332 days	23	2		2022 NT zone selection
Tom Emmett	Fremantle	21 years, 263 days	23	2	4	Pick 41, 2022 national draft
Henry Hustwaite	Hawthorn	19 years, 31 days	23	2	2	Pick 37, 2022 national draft
Ted Clohesy	Geelong	18 years, 354 days	24	1		2022 Next Generation Academy selection
Toby Conway	Geelong	20 years, 124 days	24	1		Pick 24, 2021 national draft
James Trezise	Richmond	21 years, 73 days	24	1		Pick 13, 2023 Mid-Season draft
Tom Brown	Richmond	20 years, 28 days	24	1		Pick 17, 2021 national draft

== Change of AFL club ==
Name	Club	Age at debut	Debut round	Games (in 2023)	Goals (in 2023)	Former clubs	Recruiting method
Blake Acres	Carlton	27 years, 160 days	1	25	10	St Kilda & Fremantle	Traded in 2022
Jacob Hopper	Richmond	26 years, 38 days	1	16	7	Greater Western Sydney	Traded in 2022
Tim Taranto	Richmond	25 years, 47 days	1	23	19	Greater Western Sydney	Traded in 2022
Tom Mitchell	Collingwood	29 years, 290 days	1	26	7	Sydney & Hawthorn	Traded in 2022
Daniel McStay	Collingwood	27 years, 266 days	1	14	20	Brisbane Lions	Free agent in 2022
Bobby Hill	Collingwood	23 years, 36 days	1	24	33	Greater Western Sydney	Traded in 2022
Oliver Henry	Geelong	20 years, 231 days	1	22	41	Collingwood	Traded in 2022
Tanner Bruhn	Geelong	20 years, 294 days	1	19	8	Greater Western Sydney	Traded in 2022
Liam Shiels	North Melbourne	31 years, 323 days	1	16	3	Hawthorn	2023 Pre-season supplemental selection
Griffin Logue	North Melbourne	24 years, 339 days	1	15	1	Fremantle	Traded in 2022
Jayden Hunt	West Coast	27 years, 349 days	1	23	7	Melbourne	Free agent in 2022
Jack Gunston	Brisbane Lions	31 years, 153 days	1	17	22	Hawthorn	Traded in 2022
Conor McKenna	Brisbane Lions	26 years, 355 days	1	26	7	Essendon	2023 Pre-season supplemental selection
Josh Dunkley	Brisbane Lions	26 years, 68 days	1	24	2	Western Bulldogs	Traded in 2022
Junior Rioli	Port Adelaide	27 years, 287 days	1	19	31	West Coast	Traded in 2022
Francis Evans	Port Adelaide	21 years, 207 days	1	10	10	Geelong	Delisted free agent in 2022
Jason Horne-Francis	Port Adelaide	19 years, 270 days	1	24	16	North Melbourne	Traded in 2022
Lachie Hunter	Melbourne	28 years, 95 days	1	24	6	Western Bulldogs	Traded in 2022
Brodie Grundy	Melbourne	28 years, 337 days	1	17	10	Collingwood	Traded in 2022
Liam Jones	Western Bulldogs	32 years, 22 days	1	18		Western Bulldogs & Carlton	Free agent in 2022
Rory Lobb	Western Bulldogs	30 years, 37 days	1	20	24	Greater Western Sydney & Fremantle	Traded in 2022
Oskar Baker	Western Bulldogs	24 years, 297 days	1	18	6	Melbourne	2023 Pre-season supplemental selection
Ben Long	Gold Coast	25 years, 209 days	1	15		St Kilda	Traded in 2022
Tyler Brown	Adelaide	23 years, 100 days	1	1		Collingwood	2023 Pre-season supplemental selection
Izak Rankine	Adelaide	22 years, 330 days	1	20	36	Gold Coast	Traded in 2022
Karl Amon	Hawthorn	27 years, 212 days	1	21	9	Port Adelaide	Free agent in 2022
Fergus Greene	Hawthorn	25 years, 89 days	1	11	15	Western Bulldogs	Delisted free agent in 2022
Lloyd Meek	Hawthorn	24 years, 331 days	1	16	3	Fremantle	Traded in 2022
Sam Weideman	Essendon	25 years, 266 days	1	16	15	Melbourne	Traded in 2022
Will Setterfield	Essendon	25 years, 42 days	1	10	2	Greater Western Sydney & Carlton	Traded in 2022
Zaine Cordy	St Kilda	26 years, 143 days	1	14	7	Western Bulldogs	Free agent in 2022
Liam Stocker	St Kilda	23 years, 55 days	1	23		Carlton	2023 Pre-season supplemental selection
Jaeger O'Meara	Fremantle	29 years, 24 days	1	21	7	Gold Coast & Hawthorn	Traded in 2022
Luke Jackson	Fremantle	21 years, 171 days	1	23	22	Melbourne	Traded in 2022
Jack Bowes	Geelong	25 years, 56 days	2	17	4	Gold Coast	Traded in 2022
Darragh Joyce	Brisbane Lions	25 years, 335 days	2	5		St Kilda	2023 Pre-season supplemental selection
Billy Frampton	Collingwood	26 years, 125 days	2	16	7	Port Adelaide & Adelaide	Traded in 2022
Daniel Howe	North Melbourne	27 years, 111 days	2	11	2	Hawthorn	pick 33, 2023 rookie draft
Darcy Tucker	North Melbourne	26 years, 68 days	3	18	6	Fremantle	Traded in 2022
Oleg Markov	Collingwood	26 years, 333 days	4	23	1	Richmond & Gold Coast	2023 Pre-season supplemental selection
Corey Wagner	Fremantle	26 years, 22 days	5	9		North Melbourne & Melbourne	Pick 57, 2022 National Draft
Josh Corbett	Fremantle	26 years, 363 days	6	5	3	Gold Coast	Traded in 2022
Aaron Francis	Sydney	25 years, 255 days	6	15	1	Essendon	Traded in 2022
Toby Bedford	Greater Western Sydney	22 years, 337 days	7	19	12	Melbourne	Traded in 2022
Josh Schache	Melbourne	25 years, 251 days	7	3	1	Western Bulldogs	Traded in 2022
Tom Berry	Gold Coast	22 years, 5 days	8	6		Brisbane Lions	Traded in 2022
Quinton Narkle	Port Adelaide	25 years, 194 days	14	3	4	Geelong	Pick 11, 2023 Mid-Season draft
Caleb Poulter	Western Bulldogs	20 years, 262 days	16	9	3	Collingwood	Pick 10, 2023 Mid-Season draft
Mark Keane	Adelaide	23 years, 134 days	20	5		Collingwood	2023 Pre-season supplemental selection

== See also ==
- List of AFL Women's debuts in 2023
