= 2023 Fremantle Football Club season =

Fremantle Dockers
2023 season
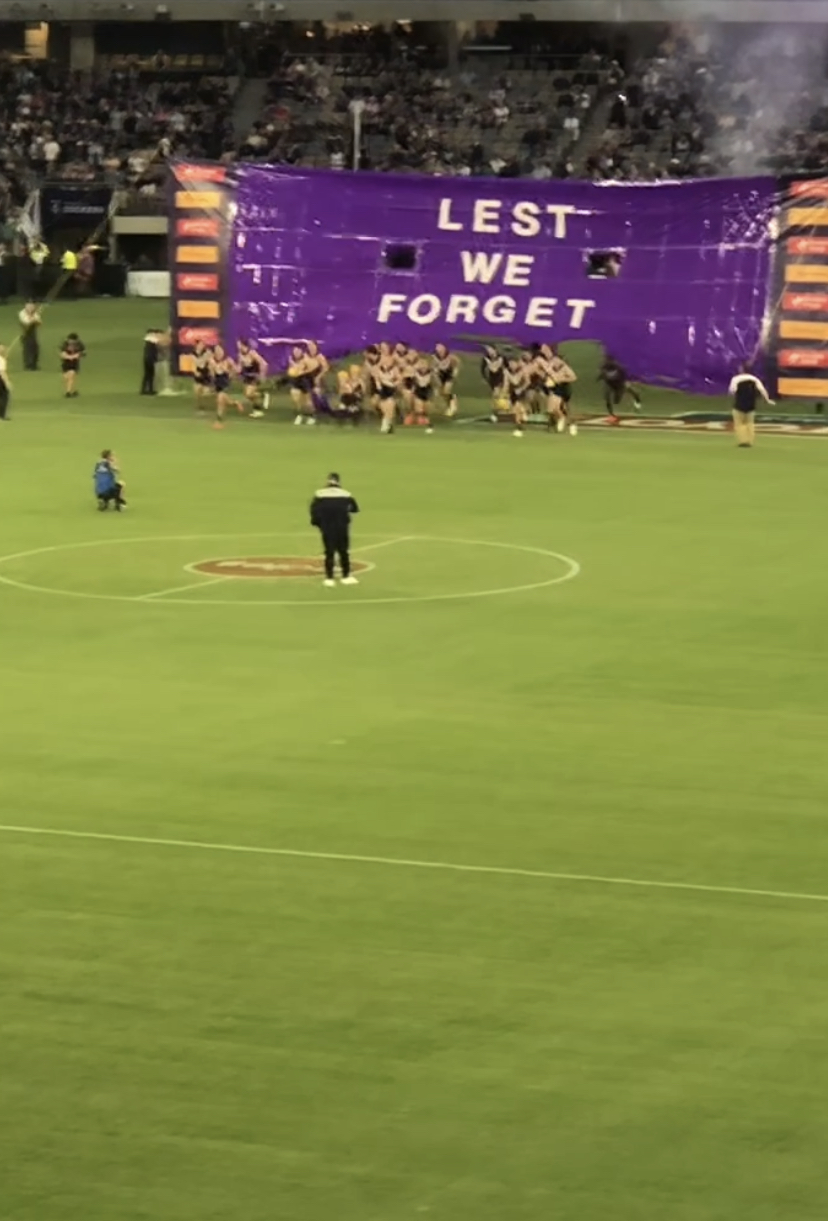
- Fremantle running onto the ground in Round 6
- President: Dale Alcock
- Coach: Justin Longmuir
- Captain: Alex Pearce
- Home ground: Optus Stadium (capacity: 61,266)
- Pre-season: 1 win, 0 losses
- AFL season: 14th
- Doig Medal: Caleb Serong
- Leading goalkicker: Jye Amiss (41)
- Highest home attendance: 56,090
- Lowest home attendance: 9,329
- Average home attendance: 36,135
- Club membership: 8,633

The 2023 Fremantle Football Club season was the club's 29th season of senior competition in the Australian Football League (AFL).

== Overview ==
Fremantle's 2023 season overview
Captain	Coach	Home ground	W–L–D	Ladder	Finals	Best and fairest	Leading goalkicker	Refs
Alex Pearce	Justin Longmuir	Optus Stadium	10–13–0	14th	—	Caleb Serong	Jye Amiss	

== Squad ==
Players are listed by guernsey number, and 2023 statistics are for AFL regular season and finals series matches during the 2023 AFL season only. Career statistics include a player's complete AFL career, which, as a result, means that a player's debut and part or whole of their career statistics may be for another club. Statistics are correct as of round 24, 2023 and are taken from AFL Tables.

No.	Name	AFL debut	Games (2023)	Goals (2023)	Games (Fremantle)	Goals (Fremantle)	Games (AFL career)	Goals (AFL career)
1	Sam Sturt	2020	14	17	18	22	18	22
2	Jaeger O'Meara	2013 (Gold Coast)	21	7	21	7	164	77
3	Caleb Serong	2020	22	4	80	19	80	19
4	Sean Darcy	2017	15	4	98	38	98	38
5	Lachie Schultz	2019	23	33	90	101	90	101
6	Jordan Clark	2019 (Geelong)	23	1	47	4	79	19
7	Nat Fyfe	2010	9	3	218	173	218	173
8	Andrew Brayshaw	2018	23	11	123	43	123	43
9	Luke Jackson	2020 (Melbourne)	23	22	23	22	75	52
10	Michael Walters	2009	20	33	222	348	222	348
11	James Aish	2014 (Brisbane)	20	4	81	10	163	33
12	Hugh Davies	****	0	0	0	0	0	0
13	Luke Ryan	2017	23	0	132	3	132	3
14	Nathan Wilson	2012 (Greater Western Sydney)	4	0	74	2	155	18
15	Ethan Hughes	2015	20	2	101	6	101	6
17	Will Brodie	2017 (Gold Coast)	5	1	29	7	54	10
18	Tom Emmett	2023	2	4	2	4	2	4
19	Josh Corbett	2019 (Gold Coast)	5	3	5	3	41	36
20	Matt Taberner	2012	4	3	120	167	120	167
21	Joel Hamling	2015 (Western Bulldogs)	4	0	68	0	91	0
22	Max Knobel	****	0	0	0	0	0	0
23	Liam Henry	2020	16	1	43	13	43	13
24	Jye Amiss	2022	22	41	25	45	25	45
25	Alex Pearce (c)	2015	23	0	107	4	107	4
26	Hayden Young	2020	22	1	57	2	57	2
27	Heath Chapman	2021	3	0	26	1	26	1
28	Neil Erasmus	2022	14	1	19	2	19	2
30	Nathan O'Driscoll	2022	10	1	22	11	22	11
31	Brandon Walker	2021	14	0	45	1	45	1
32	Michael Frederick	2020	19	26	58	63	58	63
33	Travis Colyer	2010 (Essendon)	0	0	59	32	146	86
34	Corey Wagner	2016 North Melbourne	9	0	9	0	28	6
35	Josh Treacy	2021	17	15	36	29	36	29
36	Brennan Cox	2017	20	2	102	30	102	30
37	Joshua Draper	****	0	0	0	0	0	0
38	Eric Benning	****	0	0	0	0	0	0
39	Sam Switkowski	2018	22	16	68	43	68	43
40	Karl Worner	2023	4	0	4	0	4	0
41	Bailey Banfield	2018	14	11	75	42	75	42
42	Liam Reidy	****	0	0	0	0	0	0
43	Sebit Kuek	****	0	0	0	0	0	0
44	Matthew Johnson	2023	18	4	18	4	18	4
45	Conrad Williams	****	0	0	0	0	0	0
46	Ethan Stanley	2023	2	0	2	0	2	0

=== Squad changes ===
==== In ====
No.	Name	Position	Previous club	via
2	(Western Australia) Jaeger O'Meara	Midfielder	Hawthorn	trade
9	(Western Australia) Luke Jackson	Key Forward, Ruckman, Midfielder,	Melbourne	trade
12	(Western Australia) Hugh Davies	Key Defender	Claremont	AFL national draft, second round (pick no.33)
18	(South Australia) Tom Emmett	Medium Forward	Sturt	AFL national draft, third round (pick no.41)
19	(Victoria (state)) Josh Corbett	Key Forward	Gold Coast	trade
35	(Victoria (state)) Max Knobel	Ruckman	Gippsland U18	AFL national draft, third round (pick No. 42)
34	(Victoria (state)) Corey Wagner	Medium Defender	Port Melbourne	AFL national draft, fourth round (pick No. 57)
37	(Western Australia) Josh Draper	Midfielder	Peel Thunder	Category B rookie selections
42	(Victoria (state)) Liam Reidy	Ruckman	Frankston	AFL rookie draft, first round (pick no.13)
45	(Western Australia) Conrad Williams	Midfielder	Claremont	Category B rookie selections
46	(Western Australia) Ethan Stanley	Midfielder	Box Hill	AFL mid-season draft

==== Out ====
No.	Name	Position	New Club	via
16	(Victoria (state)) David Mundy	Midfielder	-	retired
19	(Western Australia) Connor Blakely	Midfielder	Gold Coast	delisted
34	(Western Australia) Joel Western	Midfielder	Claremont	delisted
12	(South Australia) Mitch Crowden	Medium Forward, Midfielder	East Perth	delisted
9	(Western Australia) Blake Acres	Midfielder	Carlton	trade
2	(Western Australia) Griffin Logue	Key Forward, Key Defender	North Melbourne	trade
18	(Victoria (state)) Darcy Tucker	Midfielder	North Melbourne	trade
37	(Western Australia) Rory Lobb	Key Forward	Western Bulldogs	trade
22	(Victoria (state)) Lloyd Meek	Ruckman	Hawthorn	trade

== Season ==
=== Pre-season ===
Fremantle's 2023 AAMI Community Series fixtures
Date and local time	Opponent	Scores			Venue	Ref
Date and local time	Opponent	Home	Away	Result	Venue	Ref
Thursday, 2 March (4:10 pm)	Port Adelaide	13.14.92	8.13.61	Won by 31 points	Fremantle Oval	

=== Premiership season ===
Fremantle's 2023 AFL season fixture
Round	Date and local time	Opponent	Scores			Venue	Attendance	Ladder position	Ref
Round	Date and local time	Opponent	Home	Away	Result	Venue	Attendance	Ladder position	Ref
1	Sunday, 19 March (3:40 pm)	St Kilda	10.7.67	7.10.52	Lost by 5 points	Marvel Stadium [A]	8,169	14th	
2	Saturday, 25 March (4:20 pm)	North Melbourne	10.12.72	11.7.73	Lost by 1 point	Optus Stadium [H]	40,487	13th	
3	Sunday, 2 April (3:20 pm)	West Coast	16.12.108	9.13.67	Won by 41 points	Optus Stadium [H]	56,090	9th	
4	Saturday, 8 April (1:15 pm)	Adelaide	17.9.111	10.12.72	Lost by 39 points	Adelaide Oval [A]	33,725	14th	
5	Sunday, 16 April (1:40 pm)	Gold Coast	15.10.100	13.12.90	Won by 10 points	Norwood Oval [H]	9,329	11th	
6	Saturday, 22 April (4:35 pm)	Western Bulldogs	10.9.69	17.16.118	Lost by 49 points	Optus Stadium [H]	47,503	13th	
7	Saturday, 29 April (2:10 pm)	Brisbane Lions	17.13.115	10.7.67	Lost by 48 points	The Gabba [A]	25,528	14th	
8	Saturday, 6 May (7:30 pm)	Hawthorn	18.9.117	7.6.48	Won by 69 points	Optus Stadium [H]	37,160	12th	
9	Saturday, 13 May (1:45 pm)	Sydney	13.8.86	16.7.103	Won by 17 points	SCG [A]	28,927	12th	
10	Saturday, 20 May (2:35 pm)	Geelong	16.10.106	11.11.77	Won by 29 points	Optus Stadium [H]	45,811	10th	
11	Saturday, 27 May (2:10 pm)	Melbourne	10.12.72	12.7.79	Won by 7 points	MCG [A]	29,154	9th	
12	Bye								Bye
13	Saturday, 10 June (5:25 pm)	Richmond	10.10.70	12.13.85	Lost by 15 points	Optus Stadium [H]	46,843	10th	
14	Saturday, 17 June (4:35 pm)	Greater Western Sydney	16.10.106	5.6.36	Lost by 70 points	Giants Stadium [A]	8,633	13th	
15	Saturday, 24 June (5:25 pm)	Essendon	14.9.93	9.7.61	Won by 32 points	Optus Stadium [H]	43,063	11th	
16	Saturday, 1 July (1:45 pm)	Western Bulldogs	16.6.102	11.7.73	Lost by 29 points	Marvel Stadium [A]	25,412	11th	
17	Sunday, 9 July (2:40 pm)	Carlton	6.9.45	14.14.98	Lost by 53 points	Optus Stadium [H]	49,469	14th	
18	Saturday, 15 July (1:45 pm)	Collingwood	18.5.113	10.7.67	Lost by 46 points	MCG [A]	61,157	15th	
19	Saturday, 22 July (5:40 pm)	Sydney	12.4.76	16.9.105	Lost by 29 points	Optus Stadium [H]	42,433	15th	
20	Saturday, 29 July (1:45 pm)	Geelong	9.10.64	10.11.71	Won by 7 points	GMHBA Stadium [A]	21,619	15th	
21	Sunday, 6 August (2:40 pm)	Brisbane Lions	11.8.74	11.11.77	Lost by 3 points	Optus Stadium [H]	37,845	15th	
22	Saturday, 12 August (6:10 pm)	West Coast	4.9.33	20.14.134	Won by 101 points	Optus Stadium [H]	51,172	14th	
23	Sunday, 20 August (2:40 pm)	Port Adelaide	8.10.58	11.8.74	Lost by 16 points	Optus Stadium [H]	38,360	14th	
24	Sunday, 20 August (2:40 pm)	Hawthorn	8.8.56	14.9.93	Won by 37 points	MCG [A]	27,951	14th	

=== Ladder ===
Pos	Team	Pld	W	L	D	PF	PA	PP	Pts	Qualification
1	Collingwood (P)	23	18	5	0	2142	1687	127.0	72	Finals series
2	Brisbane Lions	23	17	6	0	2180	1771	123.1	68	Finals series
3	Port Adelaide	23	17	6	0	2149	1906	112.7	68	Finals series
4	Melbourne	23	16	7	0	2079	1660	125.2	64	Finals series
5	Carlton	23	13	9	1	1922	1697	113.3	54	Finals series
6	St Kilda	23	13	10	0	1775	1647	107.8	52	Finals series
7	Greater Western Sydney	23	13	10	0	2018	1885	107.1	52	Finals series
8	Sydney	23	12	10	1	2050	1863	110.0	50	Finals series
9	Western Bulldogs	23	12	11	0	1919	1766	108.7	48	
10	Adelaide	23	11	12	0	2193	1877	116.8	44	
11	Essendon	23	11	12	0	1838	2050	89.7	44	
12	Geelong	23	10	12	1	2088	1855	112.6	42	
13	Richmond	23	10	12	1	1856	1983	93.6	42	
14	Fremantle	23	10	13	0	1835	1898	96.7	40	
15	Gold Coast	23	9	14	0	1839	2006	91.7	36	
16	Hawthorn	23	7	16	0	1686	2101	80.2	28	
17	North Melbourne	23	3	20	0	1657	2318	71.5	12	
18	West Coast	23	3	20	0	1418	2674	53.0	12	

Source: afl.com.au
Rules for classification: 1) points; 2) percentage; 3) number of points for
(P) Premiers
