= Marc Sheather =

Australian rules footballer

Personal information
- Nickname: Bull
- Born: 11 June 2002 (age 24); Central Coast (New South Wales)
- Original teams: Pennant Hills (AFL Sydney); Killarney Vale (AFL Hunter Central Coast)
- Draft: 2021 category B rookie selection
- Debut: Round 7, 2023, Sydney vs. Greater Western Sydney, at SCG
- Height: 185 cm (6 ft 1 in)
- Weight: 86 kg (190 lb)
- Position: Medium forward

Playing career^{1}
Years	Club	Games (Goals)
2021–2023	Sydney	3 (1)
- ^{1} Playing statistics correct to the end of the 2023 season.

Marc Sheather (born 11 June 2002) is a former professional Australian rules footballer who played for the Sydney Swans in the Australian Football League (AFL).

== Early life ==
Originally from the Central Coast region of New South Wales, Sheather played for Killarney Vale in the AFL Hunter Central Coast competition. He then moved to Sydney to play for Pennant Hills in AFL Sydney, progressing to their senior side through their under-19s program.

Sheather also played in the academy program of AFL club Sydney. He represented the Swans' academy from under-12 level to under-18 level.

== AFL career ==
Sheather joined the Sydney Swans following the 2020 AFL season when the academy product was elevated to the rookie list as a category B rookie. He spent his first two years on the list playing football in the Victorian Football League (VFL) with Sydney's reserves team. In 2022, Sheather's season was interrupted by injury, but finished with eight appearances, averaging 13 disposals.

Sheather made his AFL debut in round 7, 2023 against Greater Western Sydney in the Sydney Derby.

After just three games for Sydney, Sheather was delisted by the club at the conclusion of the 2023 season.

== Post-AFL career ==
Following his time at the Swans, Sheather joined their cross-town rivals Greater Western Sydney to play with their reserves team in the VFL. He also returned to play for his junior club Pennant Hills in 2024.

In 2025, Sheather switched to Lavington in the Ovens & Murray Football League to play his amateur-level football. He received a one-match suspension during the 2025 VFL season for rough conduct against Port Melbourne player Harvey Hooper. He then nominated for the 2025 mid-season rookie draft, hoping to return to the AFL but was overlooked on draft night.

== Statistics ==
Updated to the end of the 2023 season.

Legend
G	Goals	K	Kicks	D	Disposals	T	Tackles
B	Behinds	H	Handballs	M	Marks

Season	Team	No.	Games	Totals							Averages (per game)						
Season	Team	No.	Games	G	B	K	H	D	M	T	G	B	K	H	D	M	T
2021	Sydney	33	0	–	–	–	–	–	–	–	–	–	–	–	–	–	–
2022	Sydney	33	0	–	–	–	–	–	–	–	–	–	–	–	–	–	–
2023	Sydney	33	3	1	0	5	6	11	2	6	0.3	0.0	0.7	2.0	3.7	0.7	2.0
Career			3	1	0	5	6	11	2	6	0.3	0.0	0.7	2.0	3.7	0.7	2.0
