= List of AFL Women's debuts in 2023 =

The following is a list of all players in the AFL Women's (AFLW) who have either made their AFLW debut or played for a new club during the 2023 AFL Women's season.

== Summary ==
Summary of debuts in 2023
| Club | Debut | | Total |
| Club | AFLW | New club | Total |
|---|---|---|---|
| Adelaide | 2 | 2 | 4 |
| Brisbane | 7 | 2 | 9 |
| Carlton | 4 | 3 | 7 |
| Collingwood | 2 | 4 | 6 |
| Essendon | 1 | 6 | 7 |
| Fremantle | 4 | 1 | 5 |
| Geelong | 3 | 1 | 4 |
| Gold Coast | 6 | 4 | 10 |
| Greater Western Sydney | 4 | 2 | 6 |
| Hawthorn | 1 | 3 | 4 |
| Melbourne | 2 | 1 | 3 |
| North Melbourne | 2 | 4 | 6 |
| Port Adelaide | 1 | 6 | 7 |
| Richmond | 3 | 4 | 7 |
| St Kilda | 1 | 7 | 8 |
| Sydney | 5 | 3 | 8 |
| West Coast | 4 | 1 | 5 |
| Western Bulldogs | 4 | 2 | 6 |
| Total | 56 | 56 | 112 |

== AFL Women's debuts ==
| Name | Club | Age at debut | Debut round | Notes |
|---|---|---|---|---|
| Eleri Morris | Collingwood | 26 years, 293 days | 1 | Pick 13, 2023 AFL Women's draft |
| Marianna Anthony | Carlton | 26 years, 38 days | 1 | Pick 20, 2023 AFL Women's draft |
| Erone Fitzpatrick | Carlton | 23 years, 16 days | 1 | Rookie signing, 2023 |
| Madeline Hendrie | Carlton | 20 years, 47 days | 1 | Pick 9, 2023 AFL Women's draft |
| Darcie Davies | Gold Coast | 18 years, 80 days | 1 | Replacement signing, 2023 |
| Alana Gee | Gold Coast | 19 years, 135 days | 1 | Pick 19, 2022 AFL Women's draft |
| Meara Girvan | Gold Coast | 25 years, 350 days | 1 | Pick 10, 2023 AFL Women's draft |
| Niamh McLaughlin | Gold Coast | 30 years, 2 days | 1 | Rookie signing, 2023 |
| Matilda Scholz | Port Adelaide | 18 years, 126 days | 1 | Underage priority signing, 2023 |
| Abbey McDonald | Geelong | 19 years, 209 days | 1 | Pick 55, 2022 AFL Women's draft |
| Aishling Moloney | Geelong | 25 years, 217 days | 1 | Rookie signing, 2023 |
| Dominique Carruthers | Western Bulldogs | 28 years, 2 days | 1 | Pick 11, 2023 AFL Women's draft |
| Maggie Gorham | Western Bulldogs | 21 years, 351 days | 1 | Free agent, 2023 |
| Brianna McFarlane | Western Bulldogs | 22 years, 274 days | 1 | Free agent, 2023 |
| Mattea Breed | Hawthorn | 22 years, 33 days | 1 | Pick 4, 2023 AFL Women's draft |
| Ruby Tripodi | North Melbourne | 22 years, 210 days | 1 | Pick 26, 2023 AFL Women's draft |
| Beth Pinchin | St Kilda | 26 years, 362 days | 1 | Pick 21, 2023 AFL Women's draft |
| Analea McKee | Brisbane | 20 years, 88 days | 1 | Replacement signing, 2023 |
| Charlotte Mullins | Brisbane | 18 years, 310 days | 1 | Pick 70, 2022 AFL Women's draft |
| Ella Smith | Brisbane | 19 years, 99 days | 1 | Pick 41, 2022 AFL Women's draft |
| Montana Beruldsen | Sydney | 24 years, 190 days | 1 | Pick 12, 2022 AFL Women's draft |
| Tanya Kennedy | Sydney | 30 years, 57 days | 1 | Replacement signing, 2023 |
| Alice Mitchell | Sydney | 22 years, 26 days | 1 | Pick 13, 2022 AFL Women's draft |
| Julie O'Sullivan | Sydney | 21 years, 257 days | 1 | Rookie signing, 2023 |
| Fleur Davies | Greater Western Sydney | 19 years, 120 days | 1 | Pick 64, 2022 AFL Women's draft |
| Teagan Germech | Greater Western Sydney | 20 years, 344 days | 1 | Replacement signing, 2023 |
| Joanne Cregg | Fremantle | 30 years, 239 days | 1 | Pick 22, 2023 AFL Women's draft |
| Ariana Hetherington | Fremantle | 24 years, 69 days | 1 | Replacement signing, 2023 |
| Emily Elkington | West Coast | 18 years, 339 days | 1 | Pick 43, 2022 AFL Women's draft |
| Lauren Wakfer | West Coast | 19 years, 133 days | 1 | Pick 15, 2022 AFL Women's draft |
| Poppy Boltz | Brisbane | 22 years, 349 days | 2 | |
| Caitlin Miller | Greater Western Sydney | 19 years, 51 days | 2 | |
| Charli Wicksteed | Richmond | 20 years, 316 days | 3 | |
| Jae Flynn | Fremantle | 24 years, 224 days | 3 | |
| Zoe Wakfer | West Coast | 19 years, 147 days | 3 | |
| Cara McCrossan | Gold Coast | 29 years, 132 days | 3 | |
| Jennifer Dunne | Brisbane | 23 years, 278 days | 3 | |
| Paris McCarthy | Sydney | 19 years, 278 days | 3 | |
| Aimee Mackin | Melbourne | 26 years, 153 days | 4 | |
| Matilda Dyke | Essendon | 21 years, 215 days | 4 | |
| Dayna Finn | Carlton | 23 years, 27 days | 5 | |
| Caitlin Wendland | Brisbane | 20 years, 24 days | 6 | |
| Elise Barwick | Gold Coast | 24 years, 191 days | 6 | |
| Isadora McLeay | Greater Western Sydney | 20 years, 26 days | 7 | |
| Tahleah Mulder | Fremantle | 21 years, 314 days | 7 | |
| Lauren Caruso | Richmond | 23 years, 329 days | 7 | |
| Niamh Martin | North Melbourne | 22 years, 333 days | 7 | |
| Jorja Borg | Western Bulldogs | 24 years, 337 days | 8 | |
| Taylah Levy | Adelaide | 22 years, 204 days | 8 | |
| Georgia Gall | Melbourne | 19 years, 90 days | 9 | |
| Mackenzie Webb | West Coast | 19 years, 133 days | 9 | |
| Bella Smith | Brisbane | 20 years, 23 days | 9 | |
| Brooke Smith | Adelaide | 19 years, 256 days | 10 | |
| Charlotte Blair | Collingwood | 19 years, 213 days | 10 | |
| Amelia Peck | Richmond | 23 years, 296 days | 10 | |
| Anna-Rose Kennedy | Geelong | 23 years, 9 days | PF | |

== Change of AFL Women's club ==
| Name | Club | Age at debut | Debut round | Former club/s | Recruiting method |
|---|---|---|---|---|---|
| Grace Campbell | Collingwood | 27 years, 270 days | 1 | Richmond | Trade, 2023 |
| Grace Campbell | Collingwood | 27 years, 270 days | 1 | North Melbourne | Trade, 2023 |
| Selena Karlson | Collingwood | 25 years, 19 days | 1 | Western Bulldogs | Pick 14, 2023 AFL Women's draft |
| Nell Morris-Dalton | Collingwood | 22 years, 149 days | 1 | Western Bulldogs | Trade, 2023 |
| Tarni White | Collingwood | 22 years, 213 days | 1 | St Kilda | Trade, 2023 |
| Harriet Cordner | Carlton | 31 years, 42 days | 1 | Melbourne | Trade, 2023 |
| Harriet Cordner | Carlton | 31 years, 42 days | 1 | Richmond | Trade, 2023 |
| Genevieve Lawson-Tavan | Carlton | 26 years, 304 days | 1 | Sydney | Replacement signing, 2023 |
| Maddy Brancatisano | Gold Coast | 22 years, 362 days | 1 | Richmond | Trade, 2023 |
| Clara Fitzpatrick | Gold Coast | 32 years, 336 days | 1 | St Kilda | Trade, 2023 |
| Jordan Membrey | Gold Coast | 27 years, 244 days | 1 | Brisbane | Trade, 2023 |
| Jordan Membrey | Gold Coast | 27 years, 244 days | 1 | Collingwood | Trade, 2023 |
| Yvonne Bonner | Adelaide | 36 years, 141 days | 1 | Greater Western Sydney | Pick 29, 2023 AFL Women's draft |
| Sarah Goodwin | Adelaide | 19 years, 55 days | 1 | Port Adelaide | Trade, 2023 |
| Janelle Cuthbertson | Port Adelaide | 32 years, 364 days | 1 | Fremantle | Priority signing, 2023 |
| Ashleigh Saint | Port Adelaide | 24 years, 358 days | 1 | Melbourne | Priority signing, 2023 |
| Ashleigh Saint | Port Adelaide | 24 years, 358 days | 1 | Adelaide | Priority signing, 2023 |
| Jasmin Stewart | Port Adelaide | 24 years, 302 days | 1 | Fremantle | Pick 2, 2023 AFL Women's draft |
| Kate Surman | Geelong | 31 years, 309 days | 1 | Gold Coast | Trade, 2023 |
| Kate Surman | Geelong | 31 years, 309 days | 1 | Port Adelaide | Trade, 2023 |
| Emily Bates | Hawthorn | 27 years, 319 days | 1 | Brisbane | Priority signing, 2023 |
| Greta Bodey | Hawthorn | 28 years, 53 days | 1 | Brisbane | Priority signing, 2023 |
| Kristy Stratton | Hawthorn | 28 years, 219 days | 1 | Collingwood | Pick 19, 2023 AFL Women's draft |
| Brooke Brown | Essendon | 26 years, 151 days | 1 | North Melbourne | Priority signing, 2023 |
| Georgia Clarke | Essendon | 23 years, 71 days | 1 | Geelong | Delisted free agent, 2023 |
| Kodi Jacques | Essendon | 22 years, 340 days | 1 | Richmond | Trade, 2023 |
| Georgia Nanscawen | Essendon | 31 years, 98 days | 1 | North Melbourne | Open-age expansion signing, 2022 |
| Brooke Walker | Essendon | 28 years, 242 days | 1 | Carlton | Trade, 2023 |
| Lulu Pullar | North Melbourne | 25 years, 62 days | 1 | Brisbane | Trade, 2023 |
| Eliza Shannon | North Melbourne | 23 years, 315 days | 1 | Hawthorn | Trade, 2023 |
| Kate Shierlaw | North Melbourne | 34 years, 187 days | 1 | Carlton | Trade, 2023 |
| Kate Shierlaw | North Melbourne | 34 years, 187 days | 1 | St Kilda | Trade, 2023 |
| Maddie Boyd | St Kilda | 30 years, 167 days | 1 | Melbourne | Replacement signing, 2023 |
| Maddie Boyd | St Kilda | 30 years, 167 days | 1 | Greater Western Sydney | Replacement signing, 2023 |
| Maddie Boyd | St Kilda | 30 years, 167 days | 1 | Geelong | Replacement signing, 2023 |
| Steph Chiocci | St Kilda | 34 years, 271 days | 1 | Collingwood | Trade, 2023 |
| Grace Kelly | St Kilda | 29 years, 138 days | 1 | West Coast | Trade, 2022 |
| Jaimee Lambert | St Kilda | 30 years, 301 days | 1 | Western Bulldogs | Trade, 2023 |
| Jaimee Lambert | St Kilda | 30 years, 301 days | 1 | Collingwood | Trade, 2023 |
| Natalie Plane | St Kilda | 27 years, 30 days | 1 | Carlton | Trade, 2023 |
| Jesse Wardlaw | St Kilda | 23 years, 233 days | 1 | Brisbane | Trade, 2023 |
| Serene Watson | St Kilda | 21 years, 304 days | 1 | Gold Coast | Trade, 2023 |
| Jade Pregelj | Brisbane | 32 years, 12 days | 1 | Gold Coast | Delisted free agent, 2023 |
| Caitlin Greiser | Richmond | 24 years, 198 days | 1 | St Kilda | Trade, 2023 |
| Courtney Jones | Richmond | 22 years, 358 days | 1 | Carlton | Trade, 2023 |
| Courtney Jones | Richmond | 22 years, 358 days | 1 | Gold Coast | Trade, 2023 |
| Laura Gardiner | Sydney | 20 years, 286 days | 1 | Geelong | Trade, 2023 |
| Lucy McEvoy | Sydney | 22 years, 113 days | 1 | Carlton | Priority signing, 2023 |
| Chloe Molloy | Sydney | 24 years, 271 days | 1 | Collingwood | Priority signing, 2023 |
| Amy Franklin | West Coast | 20 years, 211 days | 1 | Fremantle | Trade, 2023 |
| Ellie Hampson | Brisbane | 22y 41d | 2 | Gold Coast | |
| Leah Cutting | Essendon | 31y 186d | 3 | St Kilda | |
| Isabel Huntington | Greater Western Sydney | 23y 265d | 3 | Western Bulldogs | |
| Ailish Considine | North Melbourne | 31y 68d | 3 | Adelaide | |
| Katelyn Pope | Port Adelaide | 27y 172d | 3 | West Coast | |
| Molly Eastman | Richmond | 25y 98d | 3 | Sydney | |
| Madeline Keryk | Port Adelaide | 28y 198d | 4 | Carlton | |
| Madeline Keryk | Port Adelaide | 28y 198d | 4 | Geelong | |
| Ciara Fitzgerald | Carlton | 22y 40d | 5 | Richmond | |
| Ella Maurer | Gold Coast | 21y 242d | 5 | North Melbourne | |
| Rene Caris | Greater Western Sydney | 24y 203d | 6 | Geelong | |
| Shannon Danckert | Richmond | 26y 274d | 6 | Gold Coast | |
| Rhiannon Watt | Melbourne | 35y 311d | 7 | Carlton | |
| Rhiannon Watt | Melbourne | 35y 311d | 7 | St Kilda | |
| Jasmine Simmons | Port Adelaide | 24y 223d | 7 | Adelaide | |
| Serena Gibbs | Fremantle | 23y 141d | 8 | Carlton | |
| Dominique Carbone | Western Bulldogs | 22y 286d | 9 | Hawthorn | |
| Sarah Skinner | Western Bulldogs | 24y 20d | 10 | Sydney | |

== See also ==
- List of AFL debuts in 2023
