= List of West Coast Eagles coaches =

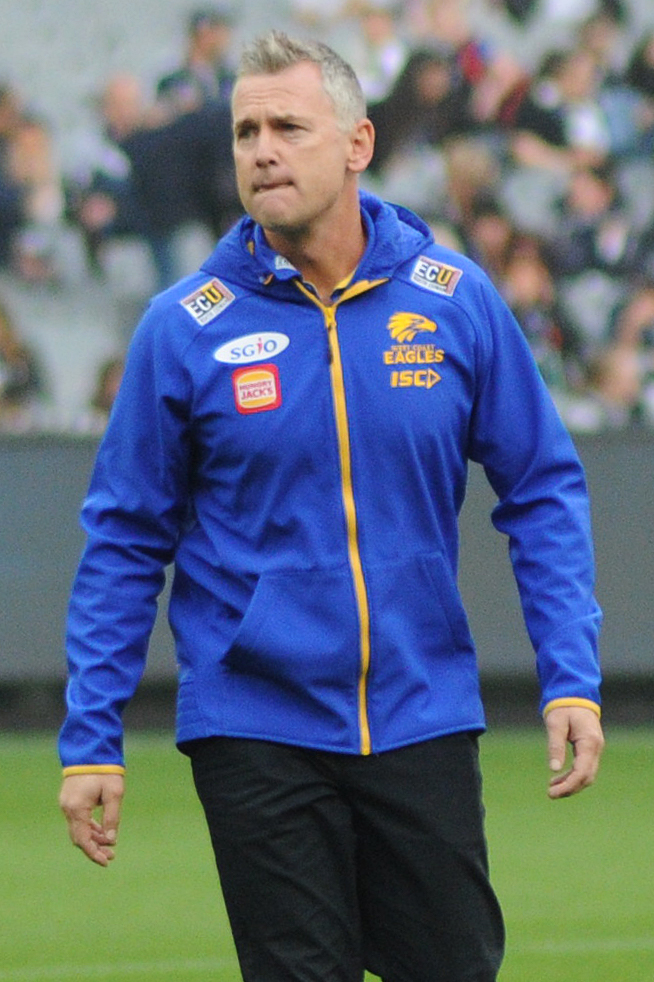
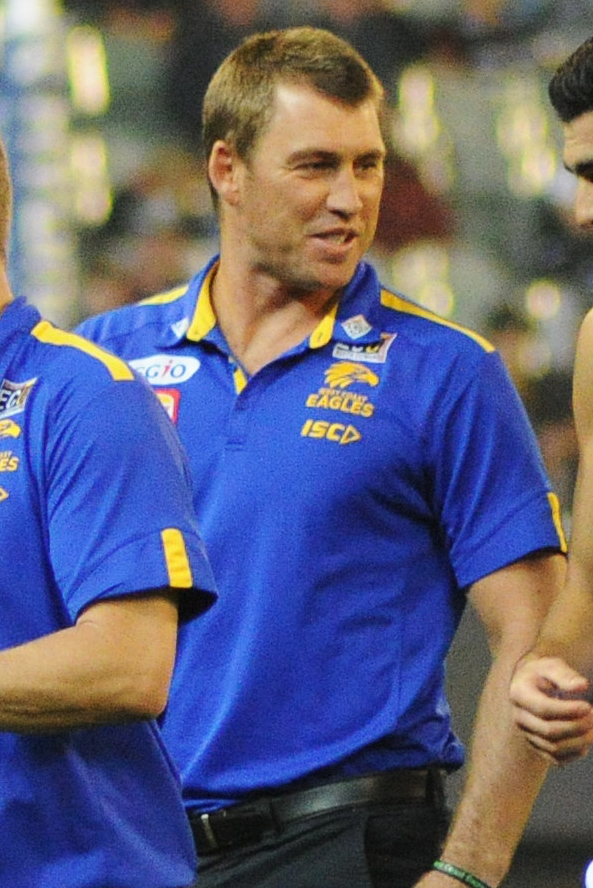
Adam Simpson (former AFL coach) and Daniel Pratt (former WAFL coach)

The West Coast Eagles are an Australian rules football team from Perth, Western Australia. It was founded in 1986, and had its first season in the Victorian Football League (VFL) the following year. The VFL was renamed the Australian Football League (AFL) in 1990 due to it being a national competition. Since entering the AFL, the West Coast Eagles have had seven senior coaches, as well as Jaymie Graham, who filled in for Adam Simpson for one game, and Jarrad Schofield, who was caretaker coach for the rest of the season (7 rounds) after Adam Simpson was sacked during the 2024 AFL season. As of the 30th of September 2024, Andrew McQualter is the new coach, making him the 7th official coach in the Club's history.

In 2019, the West Coast Eagles joined the Western Australian Football League (WAFL) for the first time. They were forced to withdraw from that league in 2020 due to the AFL creating a rule that AFL-listed players cannot play in any state-based leagues, in response to the COVID-19 pandemic. West Coast have since rejoined the WAFL in 2021. West Coast's WAFL team has had two senior coaches.

In 2020, the West Coast Eagles joined the AFL Women's. West Coast's AFLW team has had four senior coaches, with the current coach Daisy Pearce.

To qualify for this list, a coach must have coached the club in any regular season match or finals match. Pre-season matches, exhibition matches and other types of matches are not included.

== Key ==
GC	Total games coached
W	Wins
L	Losses
D	Draws
W%	Winning percentage
*	Premiership coach

== VFL/AFL ==
Note: Statistics are correct as to the completion of the 2026 AFL season

#	Coach	Seasons	Total games					Finals games				Achievements
#	Coach	Seasons	G	W	L	D	Win%	G	W	L	Win%	Achievements
1	Ron Alexander	1987	22	11	11	0	50.0	—	—	—	—	
2	John Todd	1988—1989	45	20	25	0	44.4	1	0	1	0.00	
3	Mick Malthouse	1990—1999	243	156	85	2	64.2	25	12	12	50.00	1991 minor premiership; 1991 runners-up; 1992 premiership; 1994 minor premiership; 1994 premiership
4	Ken Judge	2000—2001	44	12	31	1	27.3	—	—	—	—	
5	John Worsfold	2002—2013	281	149	130	2	53.0	17	7	10	41.18	2005 runners-up; 2005 WA Coach of the Year; 2006 minor premiership; 2006 premiership; 2006 AFL Coach of the Year; 2011 AFL Coach of the Year
6	Adam Simpson	2014—2024	242	122	119	1	50.6	12	7	5	58.33	2015 runners-up; 2018 premiership; 2018 WA Coach of the Year
7	Andrew McQualter	2025—	41	5	41	0	10.9	—	—	—	—	

=== Acting/caretaker coaches ===
#	Coach	Seasons	Total games					Finals games			
#	Coach	Seasons	G	W	L	D	Win%	G	W	L	Win%
1	Jaymie Graham	2018	1	1	0	0	100	—	—	—	—
2	Jarrad Schofield	2024	7	2	5	0	28.6	—	—	—	—

== WAFL ==
Note: Statistics are correct as to the completion of the 2025 WAFL season

#	Name	Years	All games					Finals				Achievements
#	Name	Years	GC	W	L	D	W%	GC	W	L	W%	Achievements
1	Luke Webster	2019	20	10	10	0	50.0	2	1	1	50.00	
2	Daniel Pratt	2021–2023	54	5	48	1	9.3	—	—	—	—	
3	Kyal Horsley	2024–	55	16	39	0	29.1	—	—	—	—	

== AFL Women's ==
Note: Statistics are correct as to Round 3 of the 2026 AFLW season

#	Name	Years	All games					Finals				Achievements	Ref
#	Name	Years	GC	W	L	D	W%	GC	W	L	W%	Achievements	Ref
1	Luke Dwyer	2020	6	1	5	0	16.7	—	—	—	—		
2	Daniel Pratt	2021	9	2	7	0	22.2	—	—	—	—		
3	Michael Prior	2022–2023	28	5	23	0	17.9	—	—	—	—		
4	Daisy Pearce	2024-	31	13	17	0	41.9	1		1	0.00		

=== Acting/caretaker coaches ===
#	Name	Years	All games					Finals				Achievements	Ref
#	Name	Years	GC	W	L	D	W%	GC	W	L	W%	Achievements	Ref
1	Rohan McHugh	2023	2	0	2	0	0.0	—	—	—	—		
