= Reuben Ginbey =

Australian rules footballer

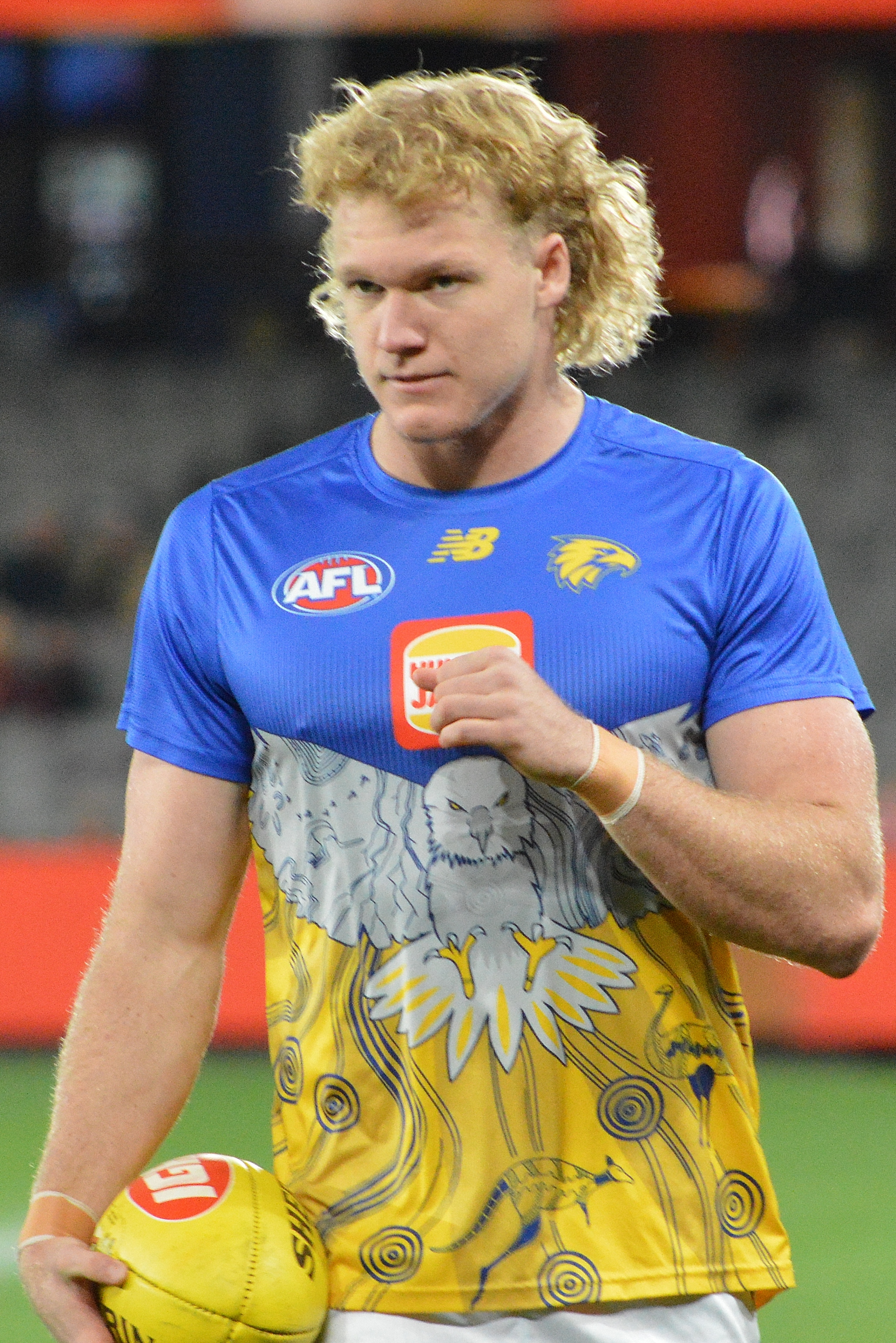
- Ginbey in May 2026

Personal information
- Nickname: The Boy
- Born: 10 September 2004 (age 22)
- Original team: Dunsborough /East Perth/Wesley College
- Draft: 9th overall, 2022 (West Coast)
- Height: 191 cm (6 ft 3 in)
- Weight: 83 kg (183 lb)
- Position: Key defender

Club information
- Current club: West Coast
- Number: 7

Playing career^{1}
Years	Club	Games (Goals)
2023–	West Coast	76 (2)
- ^{1} Playing statistics correct to the end of 2026.

Career highlights
- AFL Rising Star nominee: 2023; 22under22 team: 2026

Reuben Ginbey (/ˈdʒɪnbiː/ JIN-bee; born 10 September 2004) is an Australian rules footballer who plays for the West Coast Eagles in the Australian Football League (AFL).

Ginbey was recruited from East Perth (WAFL) with pick 9 in the 2022 National Draft. He made his AFL debut in round 1 of the 2023 AFL season. He earned a Rising Star nomination in round 3 of that season.

== Early career ==
Originally from Dunsborough, Western Australia, Ginbey started his football career playing for the local Dunsborough Football Club in the South West Football League. Initially having a smaller build, he developed into a handy player. He later had a growth spurt as his body matured and went from a winger to a key position player. He was invited to the East Perth Colts program and his coaches put his name forward for the state under 18 team. Ginbey made his WAFL senior debut in 2022, while still playing in the Public Schools Association competition with Wesley College.

== AFL career ==
=== 2023: Debut season ===
Ginbey was selected with pick 9 in the 2022 national draft by the West Coast Eagles. He made his debut in round 1 of the 2023 AFL season during the Eagles narrow 5-point loss to North Melbourne at Marvel Stadium, collecting 15 disposals and a game-high 12 tackles. He earned a AFL Rising Star nomination two weeks later in the round 3 Western Derby, collecting 20 disposals, eight tackles, six clearances and 13 contested possessions.

Unfortunately, Ginbey suffered a hamstring injury in round 18, and as a result he missed the rest of the season. He finished his debut season having played 17 games. In December 2023, he took part in the West Coast Eagles community camp, which included a trip to his former primary school in Dunsborough. His impressive debut season was acknowledged when he received the West Coast Eagles' Emerging Talent award for 2023. He signed on for another three years at the end of the season, to remain at the Eagles until at least 2027.

=== 2024-2025: Move to defence ===
Although traditionally a midfielder, Ginbey transitioned into a half-back role late in the 2024 AFL season, under caretaker coach Jarrad Schofield's advice.

Ginbey's first season as a full-time defender saw him play every game and finish runner-up in West Coast's best and fairest award, the John Worsfold Medal. He also won the Eagles' best defensive player award.

=== 2026 ===
In January, Ginbey was voted into West Coast's leadership group. He had a strong start to the 2026 AFL season, often being tasked with matching up on the opposition's most dangerous forwards each week, including Nick Larkey, Charlie Curnow, Josh Treacy and Jeremy Cameron. As of Round 12, he had lost just three of his 33 defensive one-on-one contests and ranked equal-fifth in the league for intercept possessions (91) and seventh for intercept marks (28). Already contracted until 2027, Ginbey signed a three-year contract extension in June, keeping him at West Coast until at least 2030. In Round 13 against Port Adelaide, Ginbey suffered a left quad tear during the third quarter. He avoided surgery, but was later ruled out for the remainder of the season.

== Statistics ==
Updated to the end of round 22, 2026.

Legend
G	Goals	K	Kicks	D	Disposals	T	Tackles
B	Behinds	H	Handballs	M	Marks

Season	Team	No.	Games	Totals							Averages (per game)							Votes
Season	Team	No.	Games	G	B	K	H	D	M	T	G	B	K	H	D	M	T	Votes
2023	West Coast	7	17	1	2	86	147	233	25	101	0.1	0.1	5.1	8.6	13.7	1.5	5.9	0
2024	West Coast	7	23	1	3	174	187	361	62	83	0.0	0.1	7.6	8.1	15.7	2.7	3.6	0
2025	West Coast	7	23	0	0	198	109	307	80	60	0.0	0.0	8.6	4.7	13.3	3.5	2.6	0
2026	West Coast	7	13	0	0	107	64	171	57	28	0.0	0.0	8.2	4.9	13.2	4.4	2.2	0
Career			76	2	5	565	507	1072	224	272	0.0	0.1	7.4	6.7	14.1	2.9	3.6	0

== Honours and achievements ==
AFL

- AFL Rising Star nominee: 2023
- Chris Mainwaring Medal (West Coast Best Clubman): 2026

== See also ==
- List of AFL debuts in 2023
- List of West Coast Eagles players
