= Lloyd Meek =

Australian rules footballer

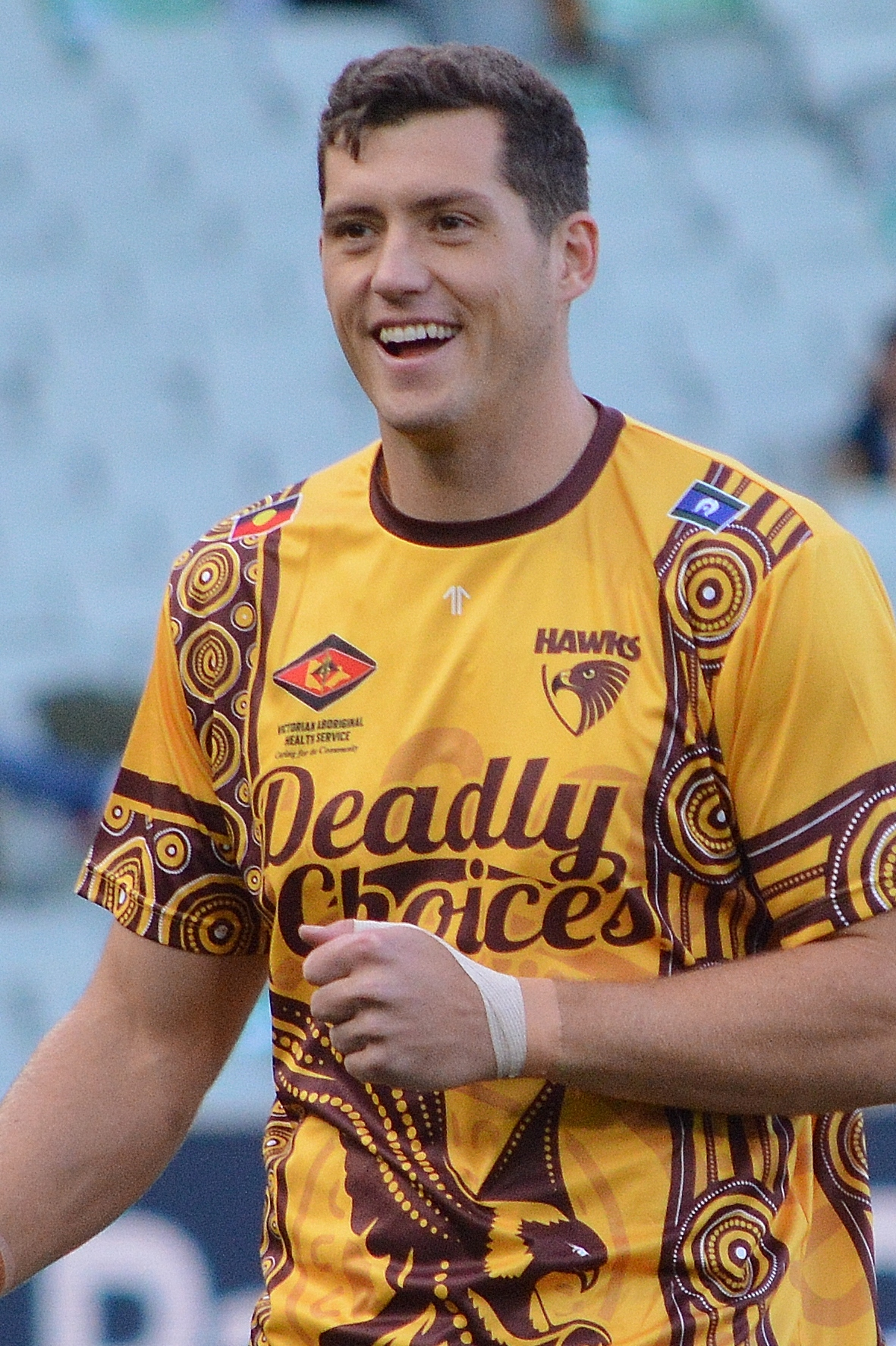
- Meek in May 2026

Personal information
- Full name: Lloyd Meek
- Born: 22 April 1998 (age 28)
- Original team: Greater Western Victoria Rebels (TAC Cup)
- Draft: No. 69, 2017 national draft
- Height: 203 cm (6 ft 8 in)
- Weight: 109 kg (240 lb)
- Position: Ruck

Club information
- Current club: Hawthorn
- Number: 17

Playing career^{1}
Years	Club	Games (Goals)
2018–2022	Fremantle	15 (3)
2023–	Hawthorn	87 (25)
Total		102 (28)
- ^{1} Playing statistics correct to the end of 2026.

Career highlights
- Peel Thunder best and fairest: 2022

Lloyd Meek (born 22 April 1998) is an Australian rules footballer who plays for the Hawthorn Football Club in the Australian Football League (AFL), having previously played for the Fremantle Football Club.

== Early career ==
Originally from Mininera, a farming area west of Ballarat, where he attended Lake Bolac College and then Ballarat Grammar school. As a junior, Meek played for the SMW Rovers, the Greater Western Victoria Rebels in the TAC Cup Under 18s competition and for Victoria Country in the 2017 AFL Under 18 Championships. In 2017 he also played four games for North Ballarat Football Club in the Victorian Football League (VFL). Meek played for Fremantle's reserves team, Peel Thunder, in the West Australian Football League (WAFL) in 2018 and 2019.

== AFL career ==
He was recruited by Fremantle with their sixth selection, 69th overall, in the 2017 AFL draft. He made his AFL debut against Melbourne in the opening round of the 2021 AFL season, his fourth season at the club.

Meek was traded to Hawthorn at the end of the 2022 AFL season.

Meek recorded a club record 58 hit-outs in round 7 of the 2025 AFL season against West Coast. He would break this record in round 17, recording 59 hit-outs against St Kilda.

== Statistics ==
Updated to the end of 2026.

Legend
G	Goals	K	Kicks	D	Disposals	T	Tackles
B	Behinds	H	Handballs	M	Marks	H/O	Hit-outs

Season	Team	No.	Games	Totals								Averages (per game)								Votes
Season	Team	No.	Games	G	B	K	H	D	M	T	H/O	G	B	K	H	D	M	T	H/O	Votes
2021	Fremantle	22	9	1	2	21	58	79	12	14	129	0.1	0.2	2.3	6.4	8.8	1.3	1.6	14.3	0
2022	Fremantle	22	6	2	0	26	43	69	12	15	117	0.3	0.0	4.3	7.2	11.5	2.0	2.5	19.5	0
2023	Hawthorn	17	16	3	2	46	108	154	36	58	288	0.2	0.1	2.9	6.8	9.6	2.3	3.6	18.0	0
2024	Hawthorn	17	21	8	6	120	185	305	50	72	759	0.4	0.3	5.7	8.8	14.5	2.4	3.4	36.1	0
2025	Hawthorn	17	25	10	7	131	207	338	68	104	948	0.4	0.3	5.2	8.3	13.5	2.7	4.2	37.9	4
2026	Hawthorn	17	25	4	3	124	169	293	53	84	652	0.2	0.1	5.0	6.8	11.7	2.1	3.4	26.1	0
Career			102	28	20	468	770	1238	231	347	2893	0.3	0.2	4.6	7.6	12.1	2.3	3.4	28.4	4

== Honours and achievements ==
Team

- McClelland Trophy (Hawthorn): 2024

Individual

- Peel Thunder best and fairest: 2022
