= Mininera =

Mininera Victoria
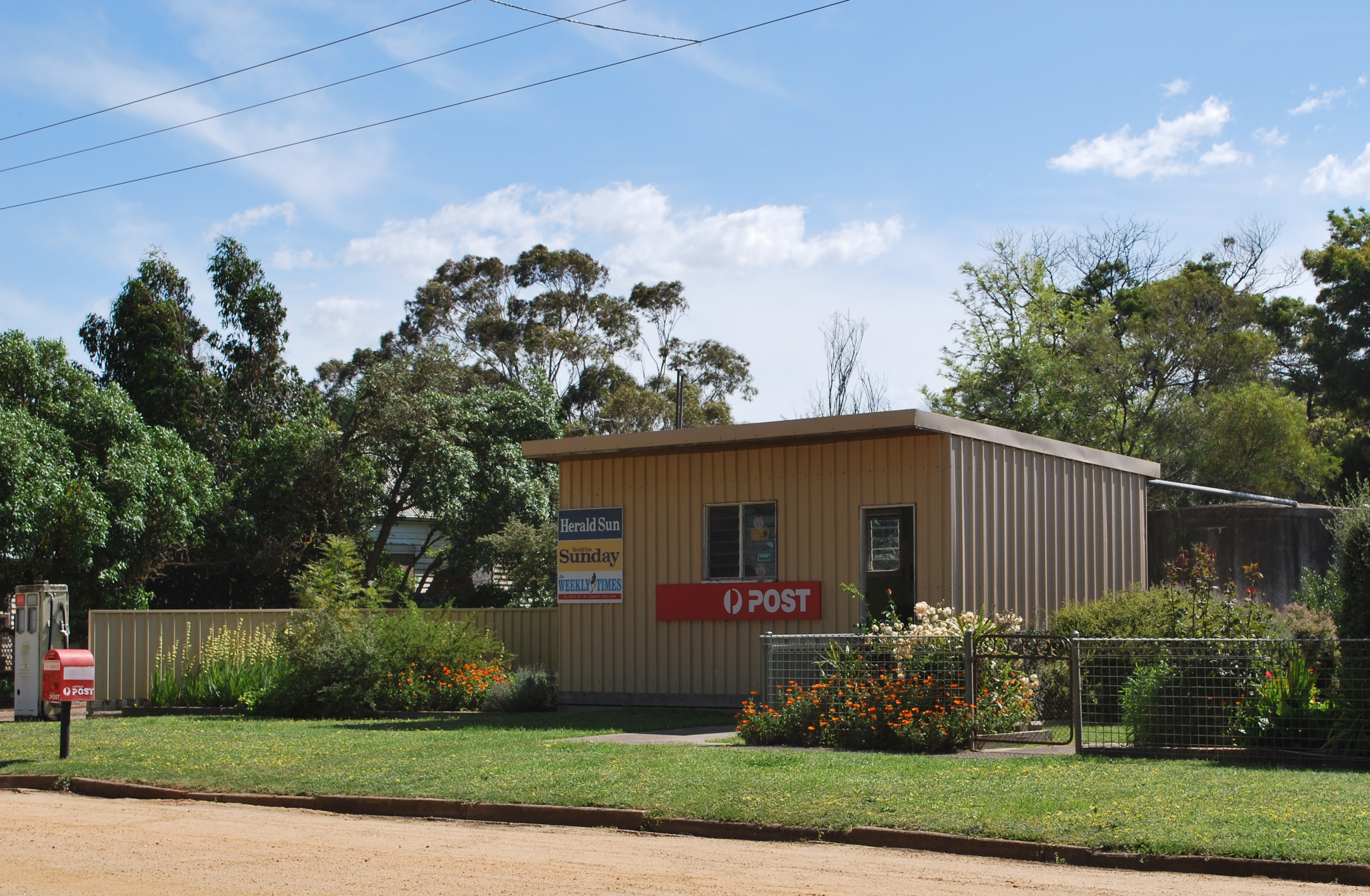
- Post office and store, Mininera

- Coordinates: 37°36′16″S 142°57′41″E
- Population: 51 (2021 census)
- Postcode(s): 3351
- Location: 215 km (134 mi) W of Melbourne; 91 km (57 mi) W of Ballarat; 38 km (24 mi) S of Ararat
- LGA(s): Rural City of Ararat
- State electorate(s): Lowan
- Federal division(s): Wannon

Mininera is a locality in south west Victoria, Australia. The locality is in the Rural City of Ararat local government area, 215 kilometres (134 mi) west of the state capital, Melbourne.

At the 2021 census, Mininera had a population of 62.
