= Jamie Cripps =

Australian rules footballer

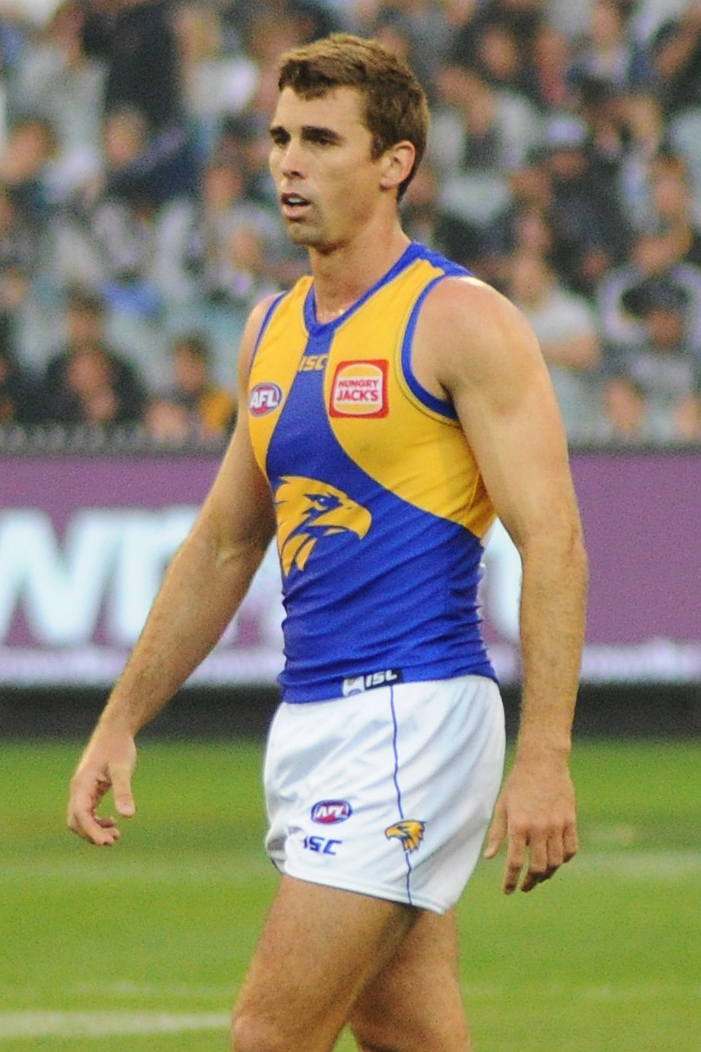
- Cripps playing for West Coast in April 2018

Personal information
- Full name: Jamie Owen Cripps
- Born: 23 April 1992 (age 34); Perth, Western Australia
- Original team: East Fremantle
- Draft: No. 24, 2010 national draft
- Height: 183 cm (6 ft 0 in)
- Weight: 84 kg (185 lb)
- Position: Forward

Playing career
| Years | Club | Games (Goals) |
| 2011–2012 | St Kilda | 16 (16) |
| 2013–2026 | West Coast | 261 (323) |
| Total | | 277 (339) |

Career highlights
- AFL premiership player: 2018; West Coast Leading Goalkicker: 2025

Jamie Owen Cripps (born 23 April 1992) is a former Australian rules footballer who played for the West Coast Eagles and St Kilda Saints in the Australian Football League (AFL).

== Junior career ==
Originally from Northampton, Western Australia, Cripps participated in the Auskick program at Northampton and played his junior football for Western Australian Football League team East Fremantle Football Club, making his senior debut in 2009, before playing another six games in 2010 and representing Western Australia at the 2010 AFL Under 18 Championships.

Cripps was recruited to AFL club St Kilda with the 24th selection in the 2010 AFL draft. In November 2010, shortly after being drafted, Cripps was admitted to hospital suffering from a diabetes-related illness. It was reported that St Kilda were unaware that Cripps was diabetic before they drafted him.

== AFL career ==
Cripps made his AFL debut as the substitute player in St Kilda's Round 6 match against Adelaide at AAMI Stadium. He performed well, scoring two goals with his first two kicks of the game.

At the end of the 2012 season, he was traded to the West Coast Eagles along with draft pick 46 in exchange for draft picks 41 and 44.

He delivered standout seasons as the Eagles played off in the 2015 AFL Grand Final with 34 goals and 5.5 tackles per game. In 2018, he had a career-high of 38 goals as the Eagles won won an epic decider against Collingwood in the Grand Final. The game finished first in a public poll of the AFL's 50 greatest games of the last 50 years in 2020.

Cripps became a Life Member in 2020 and won the Eagles’ goalkicking award for the first time during the 2025 season.

On 30 June 2026, Cripps announced his immediate retirement from the AFL following a knee injury. He played a total of 277 games across 16 seasons. He retired as the sixth-highest goal kicker in West Coast history with 323 goals in 261 games for the club. He also finished his career as the Eagles’ all-time leader for goal assists with 188.

== Personal life ==
Cripps is a cousin of two other AFL players, Patrick Cripps (Carlton) and Chris Mainwaring (West Coast).

Cripps married his long-term partner Olivia Cripps in October 2021 at a ceremony at a brewery in Western Australia's Margaret River wine region.

== Statistics ==
Legend
| G | Goals | K | Kicks | D | Disposals | T | Tackles |
| B | Behinds | H | Handballs | M | Marks |
| # | Played in that season's premiership team |

| Season | Team | No. | Games | Totals | | | | | | | Averages (per game) | | | | | | | Votes |
| Season | Team | No. | Games | G | B | K | H | D | M | T | G | B | K | H | D | M | T | Votes |
|---|---|---|---|---|---|---|---|---|---|---|---|---|---|---|---|---|---|---|
| 2011 | St Kilda | 35 | 4 | 7 | 2 | 16 | 10 | 26 | 3 | 6 | 1.8 | 0.5 | 4.0 | 2.5 | 6.5 | 0.8 | 1.5 | 0 |
| 2012 | St Kilda | 35 | 12 | 9 | 7 | 69 | 48 | 117 | 35 | 32 | 0.8 | 0.6 | 5.8 | 4.0 | 9.8 | 2.9 | 2.7 | 0 |
| 2013 | West Coast | 15 | 15 | 12 | 5 | 91 | 66 | 157 | 42 | 61 | 0.8 | 0.3 | 6.1 | 4.4 | 10.5 | 2.8 | 4.1 | 0 |
| 2014 | West Coast | 15 | 19 | 27 | 14 | 136 | 80 | 216 | 57 | 72 | 1.4 | 0.7 | 7.2 | 4.2 | 11.4 | 3.0 | 3.8 | 0 |
| 2015 | West Coast | 15 | 25 | 34 | 30 | 218 | 127 | 345 | 103 | 139 | 1.4 | 1.2 | 8.7 | 5.1 | 13.8 | 4.1 | 5.6 | 0 |
| 2016 | West Coast | 15 | 23 | 28 | 18 | 193 | 99 | 292 | 92 | 94 | 1.2 | 0.8 | 8.4 | 4.3 | 12.7 | 4.0 | 4.1 | 1 |
| 2017 | West Coast | 15 | 21 | 26 | 18 | 183 | 102 | 285 | 90 | 79 | 1.2 | 0.9 | 8.7 | 4.9 | 13.6 | 4.3 | 3.8 | 1 |
| 2018^{#} | West Coast | 15 | 25 | 38 | 18 | 249 | 149 | 398 | 122 | 97 | 1.5 | 0.7 | 10.0 | 6.0 | 15.9 | 4.9 | 3.9 | 3 |
| 2019 | West Coast | 15 | 19 | 30 | 13 | 145 | 113 | 258 | 59 | 65 | 1.6 | 0.7 | 7.6 | 5.9 | 13.6 | 3.1 | 3.4 | 1 |
| 2020 (Note: The 2020 season was played with 17 home-and-away matches per team (down from 22) and 16-minute quarters with time on (down from 20-minute quarters with time on) due to the impact of the COVID-19 pandemic.) | West Coast | 15 | 14 | 9 | 7 | 94 | 73 | 167 | 36 | 45 | 0.6 | 0.5 | 6.7 | 5.2 | 11.9 | 2.6 | 3.2 | 0 |
| 2021 | West Coast | 15 | 22 | 26 | 26 | 205 | 109 | 314 | 82 | 86 | 1.2 | 1.2 | 9.3 | 5.0 | 14.3 | 3.7 | 3.9 | 3 |
| 2022 | West Coast | 15 | 17 | 22 | 13 | 170 | 64 | 234 | 70 | 68 | 1.3 | 0.8 | 10.0 | 3.8 | 13.8 | 4.1 | 4.0 | 0 |
| 2023 | West Coast | 15 | 12 | 16 | 12 | 88 | 69 | 157 | 40 | 55 | 1.3 | 1.0 | 7.3 | 5.8 | 13.1 | 3.3 | 4.6 | 3 |
| 2024 | West Coast | 15 | 23 | 27 | 27 | 194 | 135 | 329 | 104 | 76 | 1.2 | 1.2 | 8.4 | 5.9 | 14.3 | 4.5 | 3.3 | 0 |
| 2025 | West Coast | 15 | 21 | 24 | 13 | 161 | 76 | 237 | 71 | 58 | 1.1 | 0.6 | 7.7 | 3.6 | 11.3 | 3.4 | 2.8 | 0 |
| 2026 | West Coast | 15 | 5 | 4 | 5 | 31 | 20 | 51 | 17 | 9 | 0.8 | 1.0 | 6.2 | 4.0 | 10.2 | 3.4 | 1.8 | 0 |
| Career | | | 277 | 339 | 228 | 2243 | 1340 | 3583 | 1023 | 1042 | 1.2 | 0.8 | 8.1 | 4.8 | 12.9 | 3.7 | 3.8 | 12 |
