= Bo Allan =

Australian rules footballer (born 2006)

Personal information
- Full name: Bo Allan
- Born: 16 February 2006 (age 20)
- Original team: Halls Head/Mandurah Catholic College/Peel Thunder
- Draft: 16th overall, 2024 (West Coast)
- Height / weight: 191cm
- Position: Medium Defender

Club information
- Current club: West Coast
- Number: 26

Playing career^{1}
Years	Club	Games (Goals)
2025–	West Coast	24 (5)
- ^{1} Playing statistics correct to the end of round 22, 2026.

Career highlights
- WAFL premiership player: 2024

Bo Allan (born 16 February 2006) is an Australian rules footballer who plays for the West Coast Eagles in the Australian Football League (AFL).

Allan was recruited from Peel Thunder with pick 16 in the 2024 National Draft. He made his AFL debut in round 8 of the 2025 AFL season against Melbourne at Perth Stadium.

== Early career ==
Bo Allan's pre-AFL journey is defined by consistent progression through Western Australia's elite development pathways. Growing up in Halls Head, Western Australia, Allan first showcased his talent in junior ranks before rising through Peel Thunder's programs, where his composure, leadership, and versatility quickly set him apart. His standout bottom-age season in 2023, which included selection for the Team Naitanui Under-17 Futures match, marked him as a player to watch. By 2024, Allan had cemented himself as one of WA's premier prospects, captaining his state to a strong National Championships campaign and earning selection in the AFL National Academy. Balancing junior and senior commitments, he capped off his draft year by playing a pivotal role in Peel Thunder's WAFL League premiership.

== AFL career ==
=== 2025: Debut season ===
Allan was selected with pick 16 in the 2024 National Draft by the West Coast Eagles. He made his debut for the West Coast Eagles through the reserves in Round 1 of the 2025 WAFL Season, where he had 22 disposals in a 49 point loss to East Fremantle at East Fremantle Oval. He made his AFL debut in round 8 of the 2025 AFL season, coming on as the substitute against Melbourne at Perth Stadium. Allan was suspended after he was cited for striking Melbourne's Jack Viney in a marking contest, with the incident deemed Careless Conduct, Medium Impact and High Contact by the Match Review Officer. He went in and out of the AFL side, playing six games at an AFL level, including three as the substitute, before suffering an ankle injury in late July, resulting in him missing the remainder of the season.

== See also ==
- List of AFL debuts in 2025
- List of West Coast Eagles players

== Statistics ==
Updated to the end of round 22, 2026.

Legend
G	Goals	K	Kicks	D	Disposals	T	Tackles
B	Behinds	H	Handballs	M	Marks

Season	Team	No.	Games	Totals							Averages (per game)							Votes
Season	Team	No.	Games	G	B	K	H	D	M	T	G	B	K	H	D	M	T	Votes
2025	West Coast	26	6	0	0	16	30	46	12	6	0.0	0.0	2.7	5.0	7.7	2.0	1.0	0
2026	West Coast	26	18	5	3	136	98	234	58	36	0.3	0.2	7.6	5.4	13.0	3.2	2.0	0
Career			24	5	3	152	128	280	70	42	0.2	0.1	6.3	5.3	11.7	2.9	1.8	0
