= Ethan Stanley =

Australian rules football player

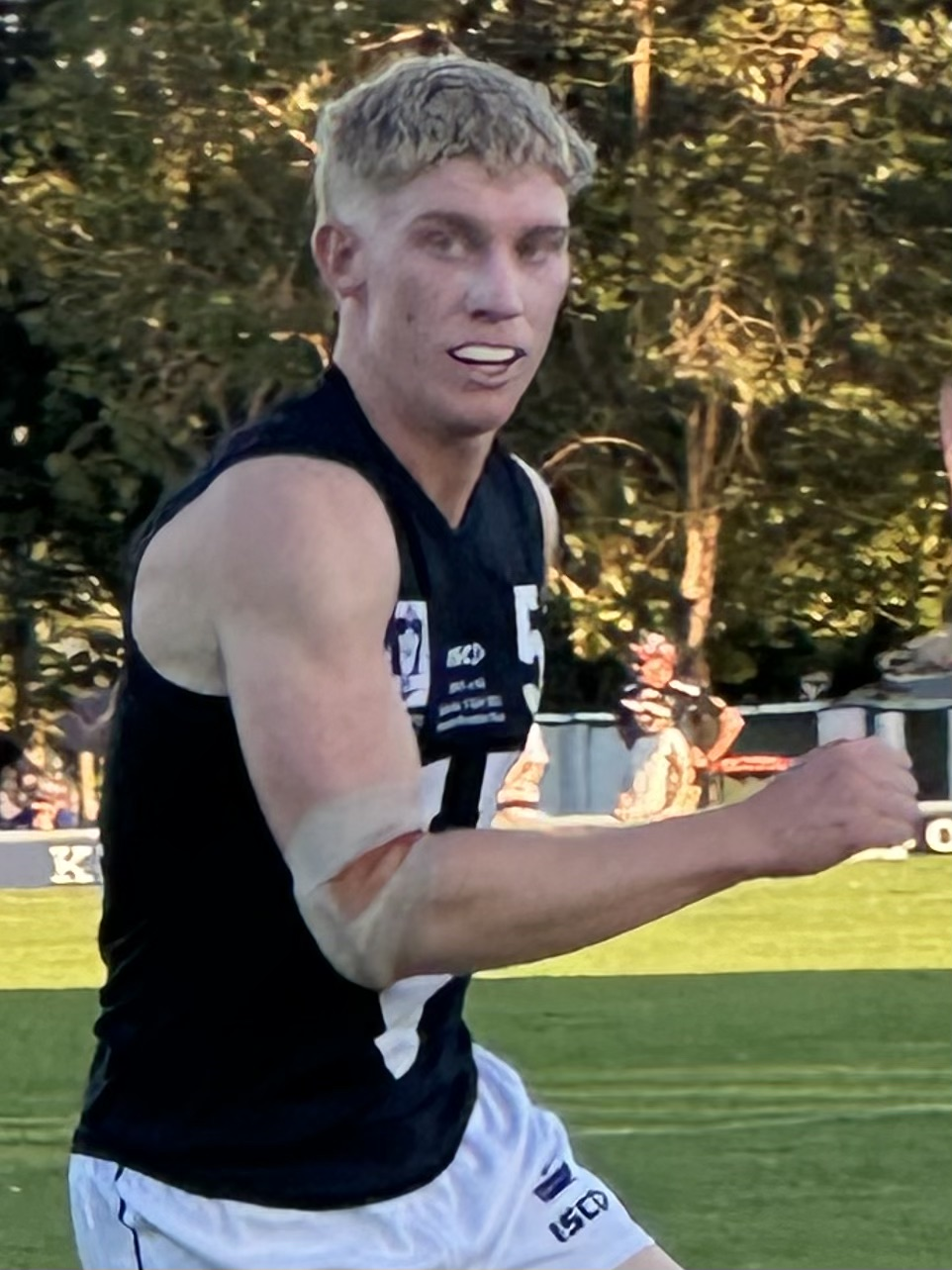
- Stanley in 2025

Personal information
- Full name: Ethan Stanley
- Born: 13 November 2003 (age 22); Mornington, Victoria
- Original teams: Frankston YCW, Box Hill Hawks
- Draft: No. 8, 2023 mid-season rookie draft
- Debut: Round 19, 2023, Fremantle vs. Sydney, at Optus Stadium, Perth
- Height: 188 cm (6 ft 2 in)
- Weight: 81 kg (179 lb)
- Position: Midfielder

Playing career^{1}
Years	Club	Games (Goals)
2023–2024	Fremantle	2 (0)
- ^{1} Playing statistics correct to the end of 2024.

Ethan Stanley (born 13 November 2003) is a professional Australian rules footballer who played for the Fremantle Football Club in the Australian Football League (AFL).

== Early career ==
Ethan Stanley grew up at Frankston, Victoria, where he learnt to play with the local junior club Beleura. He later moved to the Frankston YCW Stonecats. He played in the losing Under 19 side in 2022 grand final. He received an invitation to train with Hawthorn's affiliate VFL side Box Hill Hawks over the summer of 2023. He played six games for the Hawks impressing with his run, ball use and work rate. He was showcased playing in the "Young Guns" in the weeks before the mid season draft.

== AFL career ==
Stanley was the eighth player picked in the 2023 mid-season draft, having made an impression playing in the Victorian Football League with the Box Hill Hawks. He received a six-month contract with the Dockers. Moving across the country Stanley played five games in the WAFL before getting selected for Fremantle against Sydney in round 19, 2023. Coming on as the sub, he managed to get five disposals

Stanley was delisted at the end of the 2024 season.

Stanley returned to Melbourne and Box Hill for the 2025 VFL season. He was selected in the VFL side that defeated SANFL.

== Statistics ==
Updated to the end of round 22, 2023.

Legend
G	Goals	K	Kicks	D	Disposals	T	Tackles
B	Behinds	H	Handballs	M	Marks

Season	Team	No.	Games	Totals							Averages (per game)						
Season	Team	No.	Games	G	B	K	H	D	M	T	G	B	K	H	D	M	T
2023	Fremantle	46	2	0	1	7	1	8	2	1	0.0	0.5	3.5	0.5	4.0	1.0	0.5
Career			2	0	1	7	1	8	2	1	0.0	0.5	3.5	0.5	4.0	1.0	0.5
