= Tom Emmett (footballer) =

Australian rules footballer (born 2001)

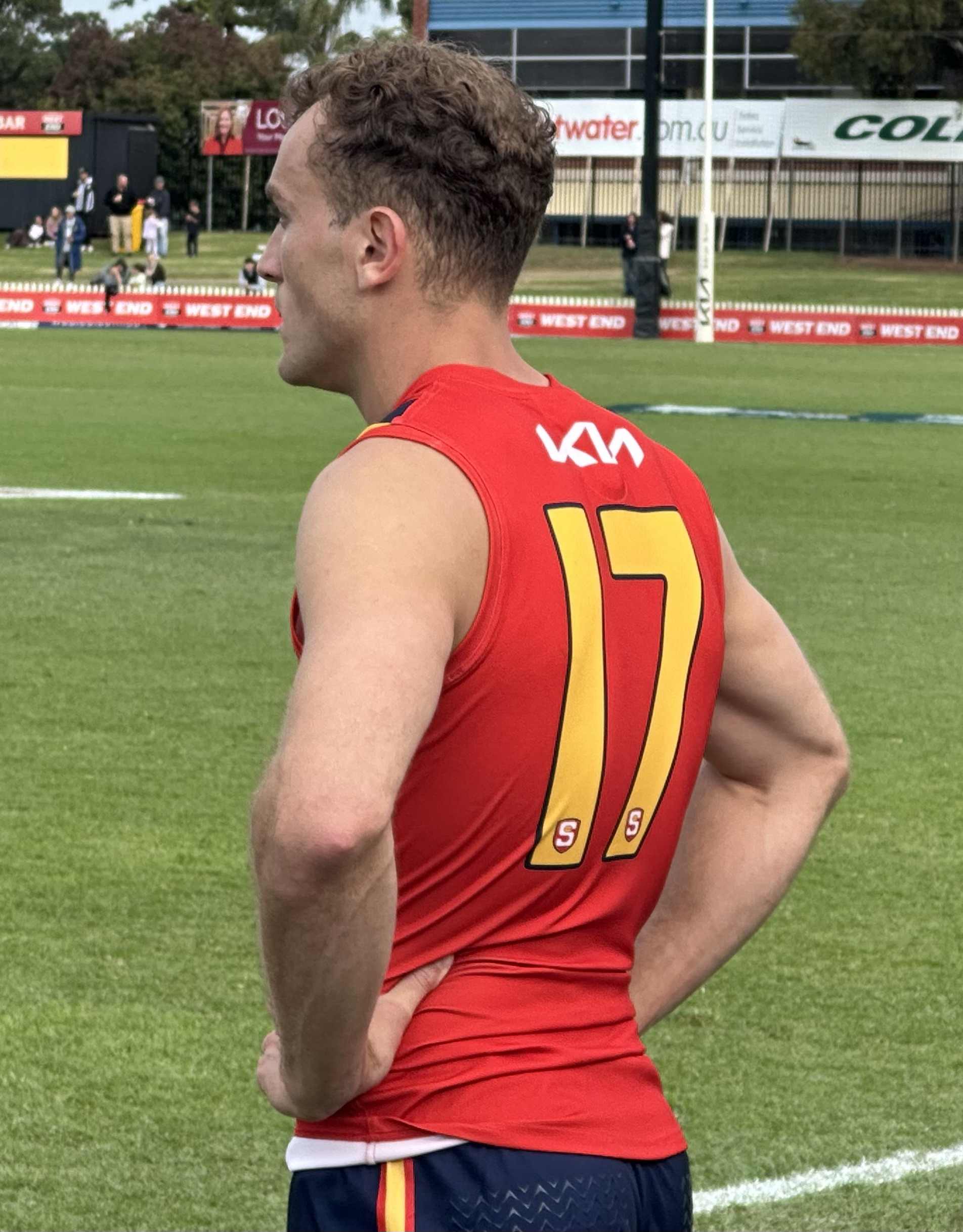
- Emmett with the SANFL representative team in 2026

Personal information
- Born: 30 November 2001 (age 24); Adelaide, South Australia
- Original team: Sturt
- Draft: No. 41, 2022 national draft
- Debut: Round 23, 2023, Fremantle vs. Port Adelaide, at Optus Stadium
- Height: 186 cm (6 ft 1 in)
- Weight: 89 kg (196 lb)
- Position: Forward

Playing career
Years	Club	Games (Goals)
2023–2024	Fremantle	15 (11)

Career highlights
- WAFL premiership player: 2024; SANFL premiership player: 2025

Tom Emmett (born 30 November 2001) is an Australian rules footballer who plays for the Sturt Football Club in the South Australian National Football League (SANFL). He previously played for the Fremantle Football Club in the Australian Football League (AFL).

== Early life ==
Emmett was born in Adelaide, South Australia. Just before Emmett's 17th birthday in November 2018 he was diagnosed with a world-first subtype of non-Hodgkin's lymphoma.

Before being drafted by Fremantle, Emmett played for Sturt in the South Australian National Football League (SANFL).

== AFL career ==
Emmett was taken with pick no.41 in the 2022 AFL draft by the Fremantle Football Club. Emmett spent the majority of his first season playing for Fremantle’s reserve side, Peel Thunder, in the West Australian Football League (WAFL).

In 2023, Emmett played 17 games for Peel, including the Grand Final loss to East Fremantle, and kicking 15 goals. Ahead of Fremantle's Round 23 clash against Port Adelaide Emmett was called up for his AFL debut. On debut Emmett performed well kicking 2 goals and having 13 disposals in a 16-point defeat.

Emmett was delisted by Fremantle at the end of the 2024 season.

== Statistics ==
=== AFL statistics ===
Legend
G	Goals	K	Kicks	D	Disposals	T	Tackles
B	Behinds	H	Handballs	M	Marks

Season	Team	No.	Games	Totals							Averages (per game)							Votes
Season	Team	No.	Games	G	B	K	H	D	M	T	G	B	K	H	D	M	T	Votes
2023	Fremantle	18	2	4	0	16	14	30	7	6	2.0	0.0	8.0	7.0	15.0	3.5	3.0	0
2024	Fremantle	18	13	7	4	57	43	100	31	29	0.5	0.3	4.4	3.3	7.7	2.4	2.2	0
Career			15	11	4	73	57	130	38	35	0.7	0.3	4.9	3.8	8.7	2.5	2.3	0

=== SANFL statistics ===
Updated to the end of round 2, 2026.

Legend
G	Goals	K	Kicks	D	Disposals	T	Tackles
B	Behinds	H	Handballs	M	Marks

Season	Team	No.	Games	Totals							Averages (per game)						
Season	Team	No.	Games	G	B	K	H	D	M	T	G	B	K	H	D	M	T
2022	Sturt	43	14	17	10	82	54	136	45	34	1.2	0.7	5.9	3.9	9.8	3.2	2.4
2025	Sturt	10	17	23	20	155	112	267	104	44	1.4	1.2	9.1	6.6	15.7	6.1	2.6
2026	Sturt	10	2	1	2	21	20	41	13	8	0.5	1.0	10.5	10.0	20.5	6.5	4.0
Career			33	41	32	258	186	444	162	86	1.2	1.0	7.8	5.6	13.4	4.9	2.6
