= Elijah Hewett =

Australian rules footballer

Personal information
- Full name: Elijah Hewett
- Born: 27 May 2004 (age 22)
- Original team: Caversham /Swan Districts Football Club
- Draft: 14th overall, 2022 (West Coast)
- Height: 186 cm (6 ft 1 in)
- Weight: 86 kg (190 lb)
- Position: Midfielder

Club information
- Current club: West Coast
- Number: 8

Playing career^{1}
Years	Club	Games (Goals)
2023–	West Coast	40 (14)
- ^{1} Playing statistics correct to the end of round 22, 2026.

Career highlights
- AFL Rising Star nominee: 2023

Elijah Hewett (born 27 May 2004) is an Australian rules footballer who plays for the West Coast Eagles in the Australian Football League (AFL).

== Early career ==
Hewett started his career at the local Caversham Football Club. Swan Districts recruited him and he developed in their underage program in 2021. He played nine senior WAFL games in 2022 for Swan Districts, and was selected for Western Australia in the national Under 18 championships.

== AFL career ==
Hewett was selected at Pick 14 in the 2022 National Draft by the West Coast Eagles. He made his AFL debut in round 2 of the 2023 AFL season against Greater Western Sydney.

== See also ==
- List of AFL debuts in 2023
- List of West Coast Eagles players

== Statistics ==
Updated to the end of round 22, 2026.

Legend
G	Goals	K	Kicks	D	Disposals	T	Tackles
B	Behinds	H	Handballs	M	Marks

Season	Team	No.	Games	Totals							Averages (per game)							Votes
Season	Team	No.	Games	G	B	K	H	D	M	T	G	B	K	H	D	M	T	Votes
2023	West Coast	8	14	4	7	88	100	188	28	24	0.3	0.5	6.3	7.1	13.4	2.0	1.7	0
2024	West Coast	8	0	—	—	—	—	—	—	—	—	—	—	—	—	—	—	0
2025	West Coast	8	20	10	11	146	179	325	33	71	0.5	0.6	7.3	9.0	16.3	1.7	3.6	1
2026	West Coast	8	6	0	1	33	36	69	17	16	0.0	0.2	5.5	6.0	11.5	2.8	2.7	0
Career			40	14	19	267	315	582	78	111	0.4	0.5	6.7	7.9	14.6	2.0	2.8	1
