= Noah Long =

Australian rules footballer

Personal information
- Full name: Noah Long
- Born: 23 August 2004 (age 22)
- Original team: Echuca/Bendigo Pioneers/Geelong Grammar
- Draft: 58th overall, 2022 (West Coast)
- Height / weight: 179cm/ 78kg
- Position: Forward/Midfielder

Club information
- Current club: West Coast
- Number: 13

Playing career^{1}
Years	Club	Games (Goals)
2023–	West Coast	36 (12)
- ^{1} Playing statistics correct to the end of the 2025 season.

Noah Long (born 23 August 2004) is an Australian rules footballer and plays for the West Coast Eagles in the Australian Football League (AFL).

== Early life ==
Born and raised in Echuca, Long was progressed though the under-16s, 17s, and 18s of the Bendigo Pioneers in Coates Talent League (formerly NAB League) before earning selection for Victoria Country. Apart from a collarbone injury, Long developed reputation as a threatening small forward.

== AFL career ==
Long was recruited from the Bendigo Pioneers (NAB Cup) with pick 58 in the 2022 National Draft. He made his AFL debut in round 1 of the 2023 AFL season. Recruited as a small forward, Long impressed with the pre-season practice matches.

Long played the first five games of the season before succumbing to a hamstring injury. He missed several weeks. Returning from injury, Long is developing as a goalsneak slotting in across half forward, he received a goal of the year nomination for his goal against St Kilda.

== See also ==
- List of AFL debuts in 2023
- List of West Coast Eagles players

== Statistics ==
Updated to the end of the 2025 season.

Legend
G	Goals	K	Kicks	D	Disposals	T	Tackles
B	Behinds	H	Handballs	M	Marks

Season	Team	No.	Games	Totals							Averages (per game)							Votes
Season	Team	No.	Games	G	B	K	H	D	M	T	G	B	K	H	D	M	T	Votes
2023	West Coast	44	19	7	10	99	111	210	46	48	0.4	0.5	5.2	5.8	11.1	2.4	2.5	0
2024	West Coast	13	7	2	5	40	30	70	21	12	0.3	0.7	5.7	4.3	10.0	3.0	1.7	0
2025	West Coast	13	10	3	5	40	36	76	18	20	0.3	0.5	4.0	3.6	7.6	1.8	2.0	0
Career			36	12	20	179	177	356	85	80	0.3	0.6	5.0	4.9	9.9	2.4	2.2	0
