= Daniel Pratt (footballer) =

Australian rules footballer and coach

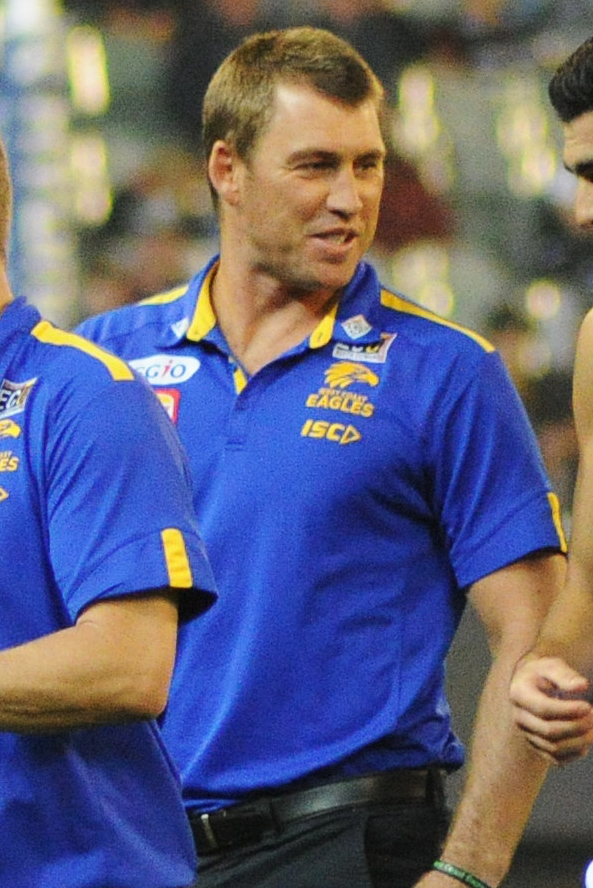
- Pratt with West Coast in 2018

Personal information
- Full name: Daniel Pratt
- Born: 21 March 1983 (age 43); Sydney
- Original team: Northern Eagles (QAFL)
- Draft: No. 42, 2000 National Draft, Kangaroos; No. 16, 2003 Rookie Draft, Brisbane Lions; No. 74, 2004 National Draft. Kangaroos
- Height: 185 cm (6 ft 1 in)
- Weight: 93 kg (205 lb)
- Position: Defender

Playing career
Years	Club	Games (Goals)
2001–2002	Kangaroos	0 (0)
2003-2004	Brisbane Lions	3 (1)
2005–2011	Kangaroos/North Melbourne	116 (9)
Total		119 (10)

Coaching career
Years	Club	Games (W–L–D)
2021	West Coast (W)	9 (2–7–0)

Career highlights
- AFL CA Assistant Coach of the Year: 2024

Daniel Pratt (born 21 March 1983) is a former Australian rules footballer who played for both Brisbane and North Melbourne in the Australian Football League (AFL), and a former coach of West Coast in the AFL Women's (AFLW) and West Australian Football League (WAFL) competitions.

== Football career ==
Pratt was taken at pick 42 in the 2000 National AFL draft from the Northern Eagles in the AFL Queensland league to the Kangaroos. He did not play a game and was delisted at the end of the 2002 season. Pratt usually played as a back pocket but could also be deployed as a half-back flanker or in the midfield.

=== Brisbane Lions ===
Pratt was rookie-listed for 2003 by the Brisbane Lions; a serious hand injury in mid-season required surgery resulting in no further games in 2003. He showed good form and was elevated for 2004. Pratt played three games in 2004 and was not successful. He was subsequently delisted and then nominated for the draft.

=== North Melbourne ===
Pratt did not expect that he would be drafted, but the Kangaroos decided to take a punt and draft him at pick 74 for 2005. He played 17 games in his first season back at the Kangaroos and impressed coach Dean Laidley. In 2006, Pratt played 18 games but chose to end his season after surgery which would enable him to start pre-season training with the team in October.

Pratt had an outstanding 2007 season, gaining some consistency to his game. He ended up playing every game for the Kangaroos and finished third in the Syd Barker Medal.

Pratt had another consistent 2008 resulting in him being nominated in the initial All-Australian squad. He was not selected in the final team.

Pratt was delisted by North Melbourne on 17 October 2011 after playing 119 AFL matches.

=== Box Hill ===
With no offers from any AFL club forthcoming, Pratt accepted a two-year contract with the Box Hill Hawks. His onfield leadership saw him appointed co-captain (with Beau Muston) of the VFL team in 2012 and sole captain in 2013. Due to injury, Pratt was not able to play in the 2013 grand final in which his team won.

== Coaching career ==
=== West Coast ===
Pratt joined West Coast as a development coach in 2014, filling the void left by Adrian Hickmott, who was promoted to a senior assistant role at the Eagles. Pratt is an ex-teammate of Adam Simpson at North Melbourne. Pratt was the backline coach in 2018.

Pratt was appointed to the dual positions of coach of the West Coast Eagles AFLW team and WAFL men's team for the 2021 seasons. He stepped down as the Eagles' AFLW coach in September 2021. In 2022, Pratt returned to the position of defensive coach with the AFL team.

=== Western Bulldogs ===
At the end of the 2023 season Pratt moved to Victoria to take up an assistant coaching role with the Western Bulldogs. In his first season with the club, Pratt won the Coaches Association award for Assistant Coach of the Year.

Essendon

At the end of the 2026 season, Pratt moved to Essendon as a senior assistant coach.

=== AFL Education ===
During 2012 and 2013 Pratt partnered with the AFL in an educational capacity. Pratt worked alongside former AFL players Luke Brennan and Luke Ablett to help develop and educate a Respect and Responsibility program which was deliverable to AFL, State League and Community Footballers during this period to build awareness and education on social issues. This included modules around building Respectful Relationships with Women, as well as an Illicit Drug and Alcohol component for better understanding of the effects of these issues and the damage they cause within the community.
