= Jarrad Schofield =

Australian rules footballer (born 1975)

Personal information
- Born: 30 January 1975 (age 51)
- Original team: Subiaco (WAFL)
- Debut: Round 11, 13 June 1993, West Coast Eagles vs. Sydney Swans, at Sydney Cricket Ground
- Height: 180 cm (5 ft 11 in)
- Weight: 76 kg (168 lb)

Playing career^{1}
Years	Club	Games (Goals)
1993–1998	West Coast	63 (34)
1999–2004	Port Adelaide	131 (91)
2005–2006	Fremantle	12 (2)
Total		206 (127)

Coaching career^{3}
Years	Club	Games (W–L–D)
2013–2018	Subiaco	130 (98–32–0)
2024	West Coast	7 (2–5–0)
- ^{1} Playing statistics correct to the end of 2006.^{3} Coaching statistics correct as of round 24, 2024.

Career highlights
- AFL: AFL Rising Star nomination (1996); Showdown Medal (2002); AFL premiership player: 2004; WAFL: Subiaco premiership player (2006, 2007, 2008); Subiaco premiership coach (2014, 2015, 2018); Undefeated WAFL season: 2018

Jarrad Schofield (born 30 January 1975) is a former Australian rules footballer who played for the West Coast Eagles, Port Adelaide and Fremantle in the Australian Football League (AFL) and Subiaco in the West Australian Football League (WAFL).

He attended school at Wesley College in South Perth.

== AFL career ==
=== West Coast career ===
Schofield was drafted with the 49th selection in the 1992 AFL draft by the West Coast Eagles. He made his debut in 1993, but only played seven games in three seasons, until 1996, when he played 22 games and won an AFL Rising Star nomination, that he became an important player at the club. He was traded to Port Adelaide at the end of the 1998 season for Scott Cummings.

=== Port Adelaide career ===
He was traded to Port Adelaide in the 1998 trade period in return for Scott Cummings. He was noted for being a useful running outside midfielder, used as a "link man" in the midfield. In Round 5, 2002, he won the Showdown Medal. In 2004, Schofield enjoyed an outstanding season where he amassed a high amount of disposals for Port, and topped it off by being a part of Port's premiership side.

=== Fremantle career ===
In 2005 Schofield went back home to Perth, this time playing with the Fremantle Football Club. In 2005 he struggled to get on the field with numerous injuries and had what was considered a disappointing season which was much different from the heights he reached in 2004.

Schofield struggled to break into the Fremantle side in 2006, playing only two games for the season. He announced prior to Round 22 that he would retire from AFL football at the end of the 2006 season.

== WAFL career ==
=== Subiaco career ===
Schofield made his debut for Subiaco in the West Australian Football League (WAFL) in 1993 and played over 100 games for them until his retirement in 2008. He was a member of their three WAFL Grand Final winning sides, in 2006, 2007 and 2008.

== Coaching career ==
At the end of the 2008 season he retired from the WAFL and was appointed coach of the Subiaco colts side. In 2012 he joined Claremont as an assistant coach, before being named as the senior coach of Subiaco for the 2013 season.

After a tough 2013 season where Subiaco could only manage an 8th-placed finish in the competition, Schofield led the Lions to a dramatic turnaround with a second-placed finish on the ladder in 2014, and despite a loss to East Perth in the first final, would turn the tables on them in the grand final where they won by 16 points, their first Premiership since 2008. Schofield would then lead Subiaco to the Minor Premiership in 2015 and would win that seasons Grand Final convincingly over West Perth. Two further Minor Premierships were ensured in seasons 2016 and 2017, however would end up losing to Peel Thunder in both Grand Finals-with Peel boasting a significant number of Fremantle Dockers players.

The year 2018 would see Schofield and Subiaco end up making huge amends for the 2016 and 2017 disappointments, which drove them to an undefeated 2018 season and a huge premiership victory over West Perth. As a result, Schofield would end up resigning from the senior coaching position.

=== Port Adelaide assistant coach (2019-2021) ===
Schofield joined his former club Port Adelaide as an assistant coach for the 2019 season under senior coach Ken Hinkley reuniting with former premiership teammates in Brett Montgomery and Dean Brogan.

=== West Coast Eagles ===
At the conclusion of the 2021 AFL season, he ended up joining the West Coast Eagles as an assistant coach under senior coach Adam Simpson in the role of Strategy and Stoppage Coach.

During the 2024 AFL season, he was appointed caretaker senior coach of the West Coast Eagles for the remainder of the season, after the club sacked Simpson in the middle of the season after Round 17. Schofield then coached West Coast Eagles for a total of seven games with two wins and five losses. Schofield was not retained as senior coach of the West Coast Eagles at the end of the 2024 season and was replaced by Andrew McQualter.

== Personal life ==
His son Taj is also an Australian rules footballer.

== Playing statistics ==
Statistics are correct to the end of the 2006 season

Legend
G	Goals	K	Kicks	D	Disposals	T	Tackles
B	Behinds	H	Handballs	M	Marks
#	Played in that season's premiership team

Season	Team	No.	Games	Totals							Averages (per game)						
Season	Team	No.	Games	G	B	K	H	D	M	T	G	B	K	H	D	M	T
1993	West Coast	46	1	0	3	4	1	5	1	1	0.0	3.0	4.0	1.0	5.0	1.0	1.0
1994	West Coast	21	4	1	2	13	12	25	7	3	0.3	0.5	3.3	3.0	6.3	1.8	0.8
1995	West Coast	21	2	1	0	5	10	15	1	4	0.5	0.0	2.5	5.0	7.5	0.5	2.0
1996	West Coast	21	22	22	12	216	141	357	54	25	1.0	0.5	9.8	6.4	16.2	2.5	1.1
1997	West Coast	21	20	5	9	202	111	313	53	28	0.3	0.5	10.1	5.6	15.7	2.7	1.4
1998	West Coast	21	14	5	5	103	52	155	33	7	0.4	0.4	7.4	3.7	11.1	2.4	0.5
1999	Port Adelaide	6	21	19	12	208	96	304	68	22	0.9	0.6	9.9	4.6	14.5	3.2	1.0
2000	Port Adelaide	6	18	17	13	153	76	229	40	21	0.9	0.7	8.5	4.2	12.7	2.2	1.2
2001	Port Adelaide	6	24	16	15	312	145	457	92	32	0.7	0.6	13.0	6.0	19.0	3.8	1.3
2002	Port Adelaide	6	20	16	12	247	140	387	100	28	0.8	0.6	12.4	7.0	19.4	5.0	1.4
2003	Port Adelaide	6	23	10	10	321	123	444	107	44	0.4	0.4	14.0	5.3	19.3	4.7	1.9
2004^{#}	Port Adelaide	6	25	13	9	280	166	446	95	54	0.5	0.4	11.2	6.6	17.8	3.8	2.2
2005	Fremantle	17	10	2	1	88	43	131	33	13	0.2	0.1	8.8	4.3	13.1	3.3	1.3
2006	Fremantle	17	2	0	1	17	12	29	8	5	0.0	0.5	8.5	6.0	14.5	4.0	2.5
Career			206	127	104	2169	1128	3297	692	287	0.6	0.5	10.5	5.5	16.0	3.4	1.4
