= Campbell Chesser =

Australian rules footballer

Personal information
- Full name: Campbell Chesser
- Nickname: Chess
- Born: 27 April 2003 (age 23)
- Original team: Sandringham Dragons
- Draft: No. 14, 2021 national draft
- Debut: Round 1, 2023, West Coast vs. North Melbourne, at Docklands Stadium
- Height: 186 cm (6 ft 1 in)
- Weight: 85 kg (187 lb)
- Position: Midfielder

Club information
- Current club: Carlton
- Number: 31

Playing career^{1}
Years	Club	Games (Goals)
2022–2025	West Coast	36 (7)
2026–	Carlton	3 (0)
Total		39 (7)
- ^{1} Playing statistics correct to the end of round 22, 2026.

Campbell Chesser (born 27 April 2003) is a professional Australian rules footballer playing for the Carlton Football Club in the Australian Football League (AFL), having originally been drafted to West Coast. He plays primarily as a midfielder.

== Early football ==
Chesser is originally from the Albury suburb of Lavington, New South Wales, located on the Victoria-New South Wales border. He demonstrated his football talent early on, becoming the Vic Country co-captain alongside Ben Hobbs and an All-Australian at under-16 level. He attended Melbourne Grammar. Despite a knee injury and limited play time due to COVID-19, he was drafted from the Sandringham Dragons to the West Coast Eagles with the 14th pick in the 2021 national draft.

== AFL career ==
After missing his first season with injury, Chesser debuted in the first round of the 2023 AFL season in a close game against the North Melbourne Football Club, finishing with 5 disposals and 3 marks. Following a successful 2024 in which he managed 18 AFL appearances, Chesser underwent ankle surgery prior to the start of the 2025 AFL season. He returned late in the year and was a shining light for the Eagles in his four matches played.

Chesser, whose contract with the West Coast Eagles ended in 2025, requested a trade to Carlton following the conclusion of the 2025 AFL season. He was officially traded to Carlton on 10 October.

He made his debut for Carlton in the Opening Round of the 2026 AFL season against Sydney, recording 17 disposals.

== Statistics ==
Updated to the end of round 22, 2026.

Legend
G	Goals	K	Kicks	D	Disposals	T	Tackles
B	Behinds	H	Handballs	M	Marks

Season	Team	No.	Games	Totals							Averages (per game)							Votes
Season	Team	No.	Games	G	B	K	H	D	M	T	G	B	K	H	D	M	T	Votes
2022	West Coast	18	0	—	—	—	—	—	—	—	—	—	—	—	—	—	—	0
2023	West Coast	18	14	0	4	80	83	163	33	27	0.0	0.3	5.7	5.9	11.6	2.4	1.9	0
2024	West Coast	18	18	5	4	107	87	194	34	30	0.3	0.2	5.9	4.8	10.8	1.9	1.7	0
2025	West Coast	18	4	2	2	38	29	67	13	9	0.5	0.5	9.5	7.3	16.8	3.3	2.3	0
2026	Carlton	31	3	0	1	23	23	46	12	10	0.0	0.3	7.7	7.7	15.3	4.0	3.3	0
Career			39	7	11	248	222	470	92	76	0.2	0.3	6.4	5.7	12.1	2.4	1.9	0
