= 2023 Greater Western Sydney Giants season =

Greater Western Sydney Giants
2023 season
- President: Tony Shepherd
- Coach: Adam Kingsley
- Captain: Toby Greene
- Home ground: Giants Stadium (capacity: 25,000); Manuka Oval (capacity: 13,550)
- Pre-season: 1 win, 0 losses
- AFL season: 7th
- Finals series: Preliminary Final
- Best & Fairest: Josh Kelly
- Leading goalkicker: Toby Greene (66)

The 2023 Greater Western Sydney Giants Football Club season is the club's 12th season of senior competition in the Australian Football League (AFL).

== Overview ==
Greater Western Sydney's 2023 season overview
Captain	Coach	Home ground	W–L–D	Ladder	Finals	Best and fairest	Leading goalkicker	Refs
Toby Greene	Adam Kingsley	GIANTS Stadium & Manuka Stadium	15–11–0	7th	Preliminary Final	TBD	Toby Greene	

== Squad ==
Players are listed by guernsey number, and 2023 statistics are for AFL regular season and finals series matches during the 2023 AFL season only. Career statistics include a player's complete AFL career, which, as a result, means that a player's debut and part or whole of their career statistics may be for another club. Statistics are correct as of round 11 of the 2023 season (28 May 2023) and are taken from AFL Tables.

No.	Name	AFL debut	Games (2023)	Goals (2023)	Games (GWS)	Goals (GWS)	Games (AFL career)	Goals (AFL career)
1	Phil Davis	2010 (Adelaide)	0	0	174	6	192	7
2	Darcy Jones	****	0	0	0	0	0	0
**3**	**Stephen Coniglio**	**2012**	**11**	**5**	**188**	**106**	**188**	**106**
4	Toby Greene (c)	2012	9	26	200	291	200	291
5	Aaron Cadman	2023	7	4	7	4	7	4
6	Lachie Whitfield	2013	10	0	195	70	195	70
**7**	**Lachie Ash**	**2020**	**11**	**1**	**67**	**5**	**67**	**5**
8	Callan Ward	2008 (Western Bulldogs)	10	7	280	140	280	140
9	Ryan Angwin	2022	6	0	7	0	7	0
10	Jacob Wehr	2022	2	0	12	4	12	4
11	Braydon Preuss	2017 (North Melbourne)	0	0	10	2	28	11
12	Tom Green	2020	10	4	55	22	55	22
13	Isaac Cumming	2018	8	0	63	1	63	1
14	Toby Bedford	2020 (Melbourne)	5	3	5	3	23	12
15	Sam Taylor	2018	6	0	81	1	81	1
16	Brent Daniels	2018	10	16	72	38	72	38
**17**	**Finn Callaghan**	**2022**	**11**	**1**	**16**	**3**	**16**	**3**
18	Conor Stone	2021	3	0	9	3	9	3
19	Nick Haynes	2012	10	1	193	12	193	12
20	James Peatling	2021	10	0	26	9	26	9
21	Leek Aleer	2022	0	0	4	0	4	0
22	Josh Kelly	2014	9	5	185	112	185	112
**23**	**Jesse Hogan**	**2015 (Melbourne)**	**11**	**21**	**38**	**45**	**128**	**246**
24	Harry Rowston	2023	6	0	6	0	6	0
25	Lachlan Keeffe	2009 (Collingwood)	1	0	68	10	98	17
26	Jake Riccardi	2020	6	5	35	33	35	33
27	Harry Himmelberg	2016	10	10	137	159	137	159
29	Cameron Fleeton	2023	2	0	2	0	2	0
30	Matt Flynn	2021	9	1	33	10	33	10
31	Toby McMullin	****	0	0	0	0	0	0
32	Kieran Briggs	2021	2	2	11	5	11	5
33	Xavier O'Halloran	2020	7	8	40	14	40	14
34	Josh Fahey	****	1	0	1	0	1	0
35	Max Gruzewski	****	0	0	0	0	0	0
36	Harry Perryman	2017	7	3	93	25	93	25
38	Daniel Lloyd	2017	8	3	86	66	86	66
**39**	**Connor Idun**	**2019**	**11**	**0**	**53**	**0**	**53**	**0**
40	Adam Kennedy	2012	5	0	153	14	153	14
41	Nicholas Madden	****	0	0	0	0	0	0
42	Jason Gillbee	****	0	0	0	0	0	0
43	Cooper Hamilton	2022	4	1	8	1	8	1
**44**	**Jack Buckley**	**2020**	**11**	**0**	**28**	**0**	**28**	**0**
45	Wade Derkson	****	0	0	0	0	0	0
46	Callum Brown	2021	4	0	14	6	14	6

Bold = Played all games in 2023

=== Squad changes ===
==== In ====
No.	Name	Position	Previous club	via
5	(Victoria (state)) Aaron Cadman	Key Forward	GWV U18	AFL national draft, first round (pick No. 1)
14	(Victoria (state)) Toby Bedford	Medium Forward	Melbourne	trade
42	(New South Wales) Jason Gillbee	Midfielder	Bendigo U18	Category B rookie selections
41	(New South Wales) Nicholas Madden	Ruck	GIANTS Academy	Category B rookie selections
31	(Victoria (state)) Toby McMullin	MidfielderForward	Sandringham U18	AFL national draft, second round (pick No. 34)
35	(Victoria (state)) Max Gruzewski	Key Forward	Oakleigh U18	AFL national draft, second round (pick No. 22)
2	(Western Australia) Darcy Jones	Midfielder	Swans District	AFL national draft, first round (pick No. 21)
24	(New South Wales) Harry Rowston	Midfielder	Calder U18	AFL national draft, first round (pick No. 16)

==== Out ====
No.	Name	Position	New Club	via
31	(Victoria (state)) Jarrod Brander	MidfielderForward	-	delisted
5	(Victoria (state)) Tanner Bruhn	Midfielder	Geelong	trade
24	(Western Australia) Matt de Boer	Midfielder	-	retired
37	(Western Australia) Bobby Hill	Medium Forward	Collingwood	trade
2	(New South Wales) Jacob Hopper	Midfielder	Richmond	trade
28	(New South Wales) Zach Sproule	Key Forward	-	delisted
42	(New South Wales) Jake Stein	Key Defender	-	delisted
14	(Victoria (state)) Tim Taranto	Midfielder	Richmond	trade

== Season ==
=== Pre-season ===
GWS's 2023 AAMI Community Series fixtures
Date and local time	Opponent	Scores			Venue	Ref
Date and local time	Opponent	Home	Away	Result	Venue	Ref
Saturday, 4 March (12:10 pm)	Gold Coast	19.18.122	12.5.77	Won by 45 points	Blacktown ISP	

=== Premiership season ===
GWS's 2023 AFL season fixture
Round	Date and local time	Opponent	Home	Away	Result	Venue	Attendance	Ladder position	Ref
Round	Date and local time	Opponent	Scores			Venue	Attendance	Ladder position	Ref
1	Saturday, 19 March (1:10 pm)	Adelaide	15.16.106	12.18.90	Won by 16 points	Giants Stadium [H]	8,169	7th	
2	Sunday, 26 March (4:20 pm)	West Coast	14.16.100	11.15.81	Lost by 19 points	Optus Stadium [A]	44,649	10th	
3	Saturday, 1 April (4:35 pm)	Carlton	9.10.64	9.20.74	Lost by 10 points	Giants Stadium [H]	9,691	10th	
4	Sunday, 9 April (2:10 pm)	Essendon	11.22.88	11.9.75	Lost by 13 points	Marvel Stadium [A]	28,815	15th	
5	Sunday, 16 April (1:40 pm)	Hawthorn	10.17.77	11.9.75	Won by 2 points	Norwood Oval [H]	9,057	12th	
6	Saturday, 22 April (4:35 pm)	Brisbane Lions	13.9.87	16.12.108	Lost by 21 points	Giants Stadium [H]	10,461	12th	
7	Saturday, 29 April (2:10 pm)	Sydney	16.10.106	17.5.107	Won by 1 point	SCG [A]	31,615	12th	
8	Saturday, 6 May (7:30 pm)	Western Bulldogs	10.11.71	13.8.86	Lost by 15 points	Manuka Oval [H]	10,039	13th	
9	Sunday, 14 May (4:40 pm)	Collingwood	18.12.120	7.13.55	Lost by 65 points	MCG [A]	37,631	15th	
10	Sunday, 21 May (4:40 pm)	St Kilda	12.8.80	13.14.92	Lost by 12 points	Giants Stadium [H]	7,508	15th	
11	Saturday, 27 May (4:35 pm)	Geelong	10.14.74	12.9.81	Won by 7 points	GMHBA Stadium [A]	21,349		
12	Sunday, 4 June (1:10 pm)	Richmond				Giants Stadium [H]			
13	Sunday, 11 June (3:20 pm)	North Melbourne				Blundstone Arena [A]			
14	Saturday, 17 June (4:35 pm)	Fremantle				Giants Stadium [H]			
15	Bye								Bye
16	Sunday, 2 July (3:20 pm)	Melbourne				TIO Traeger Park [A]			
17	Saturday, 8 July (4:35 pm)	Hawthorn				Giants Stadium [H]			
18	Sunday, 16 July (1:10 pm)	North Melbourne				Marvel Stadium [A]			
19	Sunday, 23 July (1:10 pm)	Gold Coast				Giants Stadium [H]			
20	Saturday, 29 July (1:45 pm)	Western Bulldogs				Mars Stadium [A]			
21	Saturday, 5 August (7:30 pm)	Sydney				Giants Stadium [H]			
22	Sunday, 13 August (4:40 pm)	Port Adelaide				Adelaide Oval [A]			
23	Saturday, 19 August (4:35 pm)	Essendon				Giants Stadium [H]			
24	TBD	Carlton				Marvel Stadium [A]			

=== Ladder ===
Pos	Team	Pld	W	L	D	PF	PA	PP	Pts	Qualification
1	Collingwood (P)	23	18	5	0	2142	1687	127.0	72	Finals series
2	Brisbane Lions	23	17	6	0	2180	1771	123.1	68	Finals series
3	Port Adelaide	23	17	6	0	2149	1906	112.7	68	Finals series
4	Melbourne	23	16	7	0	2079	1660	125.2	64	Finals series
5	Carlton	23	13	9	1	1922	1697	113.3	54	Finals series
6	St Kilda	23	13	10	0	1775	1647	107.8	52	Finals series
7	Greater Western Sydney	23	13	10	0	2018	1885	107.1	52	Finals series
8	Sydney	23	12	10	1	2050	1863	110.0	50	Finals series
9	Western Bulldogs	23	12	11	0	1919	1766	108.7	48	
10	Adelaide	23	11	12	0	2193	1877	116.8	44	
11	Essendon	23	11	12	0	1838	2050	89.7	44	
12	Geelong	23	10	12	1	2088	1855	112.6	42	
13	Richmond	23	10	12	1	1856	1983	93.6	42	
14	Fremantle	23	10	13	0	1835	1898	96.7	40	
15	Gold Coast	23	9	14	0	1839	2006	91.7	36	
16	Hawthorn	23	7	16	0	1686	2101	80.2	28	
17	North Melbourne	23	3	20	0	1657	2318	71.5	12	
18	West Coast	23	3	20	0	1418	2674	53.0	12	

Source: afl.com.au
Rules for classification: 1) points; 2) percentage; 3) number of points for
(P) Premiers

=== Awards and milestones ===
- Round 2 - Harry Rowstone (AFL Debut)
- Round 2 - Adam Kennedy (150 Games)
- Round 5 - Aaron Cadman (AFL Debut)
- Round 7 - Toby Bedford (GWS Debut)
- Round 9 - Cameron Fleeton (AFL Debut)
- Round 11 - Toby Greene (200 Games)
- Round 11 - Josh Fahey (AFL Debut)
- Preliminary Final - Jake Riccardi (50 Games)
