= 2026 WAFL Women's season =

Eighth season of the WAFL Women's competition

- Date: 28 March – 23 August 2026
- Teams: 9
- Premiers: East Fremantle; 3rd premiership
- Runners-up: Swan Districts; 4th runners-up
- Minor premiers: Swan Districts; 2nd minor premiership
- Dhara Kerr Award: Jaime Henry (Swan Districts – 35 votes)
- Leading goalkicker: Ashley Sharp (Swan Districts – 36 goals)

The 2026 WAFL Women's season was the eighth season of the WAFL Women's (WAFLW), the leading women's Australian rules football competition in Western Australia. The season commenced on 28 March and concluded with the Grand Final on 23 August. Two-time premiers East Fremantle claimed their third premiership with a four-point victory over Swan Districts.

== Background ==
Following the Perth Football Club's accession into the league in 2025, all nine traditional WAFL clubs fielded a side in the 2026 competition. Reigning back-to-back premiers Claremont entered the season seeking to become the first club in the league's history to record three consecutive premierships.

== Home-and-away season ==
- Fixtures and results available here

=== Round 1 ===
	Round 1
Saturday, 28 March (1:05 pm)	East Perth 4.7 (31)	def.	Peel Thunder 4.5 (29)	Sullivan Logistics Stadium	Report
Saturday, 28 March (3:10 pm)	Subiaco 2.7 (19)	def. by	West Perth 4.6 (30)	Sullivan Logistics Stadium	Report
Saturday, 28 March (4:00 pm)	Claremont 1.4 (10)	def. by	Swan Districts 7.9 (51)	Revo Fitness Stadium	Report
Saturday, 28 March (4:25 pm)	South Fremantle 7.11 (53)	def.	East Fremantle 0.4 (4)	Fremantle Community Bank Oval	Report
	Bye: Perth

=== Round 2 ===
	Round 2
Friday, 3 April (12:25 pm)	Swan Districts 10.5 (65)	def.	South Fremantle 2.5 (17)	Steel Blue Oval	Report
Friday, 3 April (4:00 pm)	Peel Thunder 3.1 (19)	def. by	East Fremantle 9.5 (59)	Lane Group Stadium	Report
Friday, 3 April (5:00 pm)	Perth 1.6 (12)	def. by	Subiaco 3.6 (24)	Mineral Resources Park	Report
Friday, 3 April (7:05 pm)	West Perth 10.4 (64)	def.	Claremont 10.6 (66)	HIF Health Insurance Oval	Report
	Bye: East Perth

=== Round 3 ===
	Round 3
Friday, 10 April (6:55 pm)	East Fremantle 4.4 (28)	def. by	Swan Districts 7.9 (51)	The Good Grocer Park	Report
Saturday, 11 April (4:25 pm)	South Fremantle 8.7 (55)	drew with	Perth 8.7 (55)	Fremantle Community Bank Oval	Report
Saturday, 11 April (4:55 pm)	East Perth 4.2 (26)	def. by	Subiaco 10.5 (65)	Sullivan Logistics Stadium	Report
Sunday, 12 April (12:10 pm)	Claremont 14.7 (91)	def.	Peel Thunder 3.3 (21)	Revo Fitness Stadium	Report
	Bye: West Perth

=== Round 4 ===
	Round 4
Saturday, 18 April (12:25 pm)	Swan Districts 7.8 (50)	def.	West Perth 6.8 (44)	Steel Blue Oval	Report
Saturday, 18 April (6:00 pm)	Peel Thunder 5.4 (34)	def. by	Perth 8.5 (53)	Lane Group Stadium	Report
Sunday, 19 April (12:10 pm)	South Fremantle 6.2 (38)	def. by	Claremont 8.13 (61)	Fremantle Community Bank Oval	Report
Sunday, 19 April (2:10 pm)	East Perth 4.3 (27)	def. by	East Fremantle 8.4 (52)	Sullivan Logistics Stadium	Report
	Bye: Subiaco

=== Round 5 ===
	Round 5
Friday, 24 April (6:30 pm)	Perth 1.11 (17)	def. by	Swan Districts 4.7 (31)	Mineral Resources Park	Report
Saturday, 25 April (5:15 pm)	Subiaco 6.10 (46)	def.	Peel Thunder 6.2 (38)	Sullivan Logistics Stadium	Report
Sunday, 26 April (9:15 am)	West Perth 5.8 (38)	def.	South Fremantle 4.6 (30)	HIF Health Insurance Oval	Report
Sunday, 26 April (12:10 pm)	Claremont 10.6 (66)	def.	East Perth 6.4 (40)	Revo Fitness Stadium	Report
	Bye: East Fremantle

=== Round 6 ===
	Round 6
Friday, 1 May (7:25 pm)	East Fremantle 6.2 (38)	def.	Perth 3.3 (21)	The Good Grocer Park	Report
Saturday, 2 May (11:05 am)	Peel Thunder 4.1 (25)	def. by	West Perth 13.12 (90)	Lane Group Stadium	Report
Sunday, 3 May (12:10 pm)	Subiaco 3.3 (21)	def. by	South Fremantle 5.7 (37)	Sullivan Logistics Stadium	Report
Sunday, 3 May (2:15 pm)	East Perth 3.2 (20)	def. by	Swan Districts 10.9 (69)	Sullivan Logistics Stadium	Report
	Bye: Claremont

=== Round 7 ===
	Round 7
Friday, 8 May (7:25 pm)	East Fremantle 4.1 (25)	def.	Claremont 3.6 (24)	The Good Grocer Park	Report
Saturday, 9 May (11:20 am)	West Perth 6.6 (42)	def. by	Subiaco 6.8 (44)	HIF Health Insurance Oval	Report
Saturday, 9 May (11:35 am)	South Fremantle 9.3 (57)	def.	Peel Thunder 7.2 (44)	Fremantle Community Bank Oval	Report
Sunday, 10 May (12:10 pm)	Perth 8.8 (56)	def.	East Perth 2.7 (19)	Mineral Resources Park	Report
	Bye: Swan Districts

=== Round 8 ===
	Round 8
Saturday, 23 May (11:05 am)	Peel Thunder 5.4 (34)	def. by	East Perth 5.5 (35)	Lane Group Stadium	Report
Saturday, 23 May (5:00 pm)	Perth 9.2 (56)	def.	West Perth 6.9 (45)	Mineral Resources Park	Report
Saturday, 23 May (6:05 pm)	East Fremantle 4.5 (29)	def.	Subiaco 2.12 (24)	The Good Grocer Park	Report
Sunday, 24 May (12:10 pm)	Swan Districts 1.4 (10)	def. by	Claremont 6.7 (43)	Steel Blue Oval	Report
	Bye: South Fremantle

=== Round 9 ===
	Round 9
Friday, 29 May (7:20 pm)	Subiaco 4.5 (29)	def. by	Swan Districts 4.9 (33)	Sullivan Logistics Stadium	Report
Friday, 29 May (7:25 pm)	East Fremantle 5.3 (33)	def.	South Fremantle 4.8 (32)	The Good Grocer Park	Report
Saturday, 30 May (5:05 pm)	West Perth 8.6 (54)	def.	East Perth 4.0 (24)	HIF Health Insurance Oval	Report
Sunday, 31 May (12:10 pm)	Claremont 6.4 (40)	def.	Perth 2.5 (17)	Revo Fitness Stadium	Report
	Bye: Peel Thunder

=== Round 10 ===
	Round 10
Friday, 5 June (7:35 pm)	West Perth 7.11 (53)	def.	East Fremantle 1.4 (10)	HIF Health Insurance Oval	Report
Saturday, 6 June (3:50 pm)	Claremont 4.4 (28)	def.	Subiaco 3.4 (22)	Revo Fitness Stadium	Report
Saturday, 6 June (4:00 pm)	Peel Thunder 4.3 (27)	def. by	Swan Districts 19.3 (117)	Lane Group Stadium	Report
Saturday, 6 June (7:05 pm)	East Perth 4.5 (29)	def. by	South Fremantle 7.3 (45)	Sullivan Logistics Stadium	Report
	Bye: Perth

=== Round 11 ===
	Round 11
Saturday, 13 June (12:10 pm)	Subiaco 5.4 (34)	def. by	Perth 5.8 (38)	Sullivan Logistics Stadium	Report
Saturday, 13 June (12:10 pm)	Swan Districts 7.4 (46)	def.	East Perth 4.6 (30)	Steel Blue Oval	Report
Saturday, 13 June (12:10 pm)	South Fremantle 6.3 (39)	def.	West Perth 5.6 (36)	Fremantle Community Bank Oval	Report
Saturday, 13 June (2:10 pm)	Peel Thunder 5.4 (34)	def. by	Claremont 13.10 (88)	Lane Group Stadium	Report
	Bye: East Fremantle

=== Round 12 ===
	Round 12
Saturday, 20 June (12:10 pm)	Perth 15.8 (98)	def.	Peel Thunder 2.2 (14)	Mineral Resources Park	Report
Sunday, 21 June (12:10 pm)	South Fremantle 5.2 (32)	def. by	Swan Districts 16.5 (101)	Fremantle Community Bank Oval	Report
Sunday, 21 June (12:10 pm)	East Perth 1.5 (11)	def. by	Claremont 8.8 (56)	Sullivan Logistics Stadium	Report
Sunday, 21 June (2:15 pm)	Subiaco 3.5 (23)	def. by	East Fremantle 5.6 (36)	Sullivan Logistics Stadium	Report
	Bye: West Perth

=== Round 13 ===
	Round 13
Saturday, 27 June (12:10 pm)	Swan Districts 3.8 (26)	def. by	Subiaco 5.1 (31)	Steel Blue Oval	Report
Saturday, 27 June (3:05 pm)	Claremont 4.8 (32)	def.	East Fremantle 4.5 (29)	Revo Fitness Stadium	Report
Saturday, 27 June (5:00 pm)	Perth 3.4 (22)	def. by	South Fremantle 3.6 (24)	Mineral Resources Park	Report
Sunday, 28 June (5:00 pm)	West Perth 4.9 (33)	def.	Peel Thunder 2.7 (19)	HIF Health Insurance Oval	Report
	Bye: East Perth

=== Round 14 ===
	Round 14
Saturday, 4 July (12:10 pm)	Swan Districts 8.6 (54)	def.	East Fremantle 4.3 (27)	Steel Blue Oval	Report
Saturday, 4 July (3:00 pm)	Peel Thunder 5.5 (35)	def. by	Subiaco 10.5 (65)	Lane Group Stadium	Report
Saturday, 4 July (5:20 pm)	East Perth 3.6 (24)	def. by	Perth 9.9 (63)	Sullivan Logistics Stadium	Report
Sunday, 5 July (12:10 pm)	Claremont 12.8 (80)	def.	West Perth 1.6 (12)	Revo Fitness Stadium	Report
	Bye: South Fremantle

=== Round 15 ===
	Round 15
Saturday, 11 July (11:10 am)	Perth 5.3 (33)	def. by	Claremont 5.6 (36)	Mineral Resources Park	Report
Saturday, 11 July (3:40 pm)	Peel Thunder 3.2 (20)	def. by	South Fremantle 12.10 (82)	Lane Group Stadium	Report
Saturday, 11 July (4:35 pm)	West Perth 1.4 (10)	def. by	Swan Districts 3.10 (28)	HIF Health Insurance Oval	Report
Sunday, 12 July (12:10 pm)	East Fremantle 6.4 (40)	def.	East Perth 4.5 (29)	The Good Grocer Park	Report
	Bye: Subiaco

=== Round 16 ===
	Round 16
Saturday, 18 July (4:35 am)	West Perth 3.5 (23)	def. by	Perth 8.7 (55)	HIF Health Insurance Oval	Report
Sunday, 19 July (12:10 pm)	Subiaco 5.2 (32)	def.	Claremont 4.7 (31)	Sullivan Logistics Stadium	Report
Sunday, 19 July (12:10 pm)	East Fremantle 7.2 (44)	def.	Peel Thunder 2.4 (16)	The Good Grocer Park	Report
Sunday, 19 July (12:10 pm)	South Fremantle 9.8 (62)	def.	East Perth 2.2 (14)	Fremantle Community Bank Oval	Report
	Bye: Swan Districts

=== Round 17 ===
	Round 17
Saturday, 25 July (12:10 am)	Perth 6.11 (47)	def.	East Fremantle 2.5 (17)	Mineral Resources Park	Report
Saturday, 25 July (12:10 pm)	South Fremantle 9.6 (60)	def.	Subiaco 7.5 (47)	Fremantle Community Bank Oval	Report
Saturday, 25 July (2:00 pm)	Swan Districts 12.11 (83)	def.	Peel Thunder 1.3 (9)	Steel Blue Oval	Report
Sunday, 26 July (2:10 pm)	East Perth 3.1 (19)	def. by	West Perth 9.15 (69)	Sullivan Logistics Stadium	Report
	Bye: Claremont

=== Round 18 ===
	Round 18
Sunday, 2 August (12:10 am)	Claremont 9.6 (60)	def.	South Fremantle 2.4 (16)	Revo Fitness Stadium	Report
Sunday, 2 August (12:10 pm)	Swan Districts 7.4 (46)	def.	Perth 3.7 (25)	Steel Blue Oval	Report
Sunday, 2 August (12:10 pm)	Subiaco 10.4 (64)	def.	East Perth 4.2 (26)	Sullivan Logistics Stadium	Report
Sunday, 2 August (12:10 pm)	East Fremantle 6.4 (40)	def.	West Perth 5.7 (37)	The Good Grocer Park	Report
	Bye: Peel Thunder

== Ladder ==
Pos	Team	Pld	W	L	D	PF	PA	PP	Pts	Qualification
1	Swan Districts	16	14	2	0	861	399	215.8	56	Finals series
2	Claremont	16	13	3	0	812	455	178.5	52	Finals series
3	East Fremantle (P)	16	10	6	0	511	542	94.3	40	Finals series
4	South Fremantle	16	9	6	1	679	650	104.5	38	Finals series
5	Perth	16	8	7	1	668	504	132.5	34	
6	Subiaco	16	8	8	0	590	527	112.0	32	
7	West Perth	16	7	9	0	680	604	112.6	28	
8	East Perth	16	2	14	0	404	870	46.4	8	
9	Peel Thunder	16	0	16	0	418	1072	39.0	0	

Source: WAFL
Rules for classification: 1) points; 2) percentage; 3) number of points for.
(P) Premiers

== Finals series ==
=== Semi-finals ===
	First Semi-Final
Sunday, 9 August (11:45 am)	Swan Districts 5.4 (34)	def.	Claremont 5.3 (33)	Steel Blue Oval	Report

	Second Semi-Final
Sunday, 9 August (12:30 pm)	East Fremantle 3.4 (22)	def.	South Fremantle 2.6 (18)	The Good Grocer Park	Report

=== Preliminary final ===
	Preliminary Final
Sunday, 16 August (12:45 pm)	Claremont 5.8 (38)	def. by	East Fremantle 7.2 (44)	Revo Fitness Stadium	Report

=== Grand Final ===
2026 WAFLW Grand Final
Sunday, 23 August (2:05 pm)	Swan Districts	def. by	East Fremantle	Fremantle Community Bank Oval
1.4 (10); 1.4 (10); 2.6 (18); 2.7 (19)	Q1; Q2; Q3; Final	1.0 (6); 1.2 (8); 1.3 (9); 3.5 (23)	Lou Knitter Medal (Best on ground): Jaime Henry (Swan Districts); Television broadcast: Seven Network
Edwards, Yarran 1	Goals	Keley 2 Jezierski-Brown 1
Henry, Sly, Davis, Ajduk, King	Best	Keley, Leslie, Raison, Jezierski-Brown, Atkins

== Awards ==
- Dhara Kerr Award

Jaime Henry (Swan Districts) − 35 votes

- Joanne Huggins Leading Goal Kicker Award

Ashley Sharp (Swan Districts) − 36 goals

- Cath Boyce Rising Star Award

Olivia McCay (East Fremantle)

- WAFLW Coach of the Year

Jason Burton (Swan Districts)

- Rogers Cup Fairest and Best

Dhi Perera (Subiaco)

- Rogers Cup Leading Goal Kicker

Ava Cooper (Subiaco)

- Rogers Cup Premiers

Swan Districts

== Representative match ==
=== WAFLW vs SANFLW ===
For the third successive season, an interstate representative match was fixtured between the WAFL Women's (WAFLW) and SANFL Women's League (SANFLW).

2026 State Game
Saturday, 16 May (12:40pm AWST)	WAFLW	def.	SANFLW	Sullivan Logistics Stadium
3.5 (23); 7.6 (48); 14.8 (92); 15.9 (99)	Q1; Q2; Q3; Final	0.0 (0); 0.1 (1); 0.1 (1); 1.1 (7)	Best on ground medal (WAFLW) & Best on ground medal (SANFLW): Jayme Harken (WAFLW) & Alice Tentye (SANFLW); Television broadcast: YouTube
Stockwell 4 Greenwood 3 Britton, Lindgren, Petrevski 2 Shannon, Tuhakaraina 1	Goals	Anderson 1
Harken, Stockwell, Petrevski, Henry, Greenwood, Shannon	Best	Tentye, Venning, King, Wiencke, Ballard

=== Western Australian team ===
2026 WAFLW State Team vs. South Australia
B:	21. Tiani Teakle; (East Fremantle)	18. Sienna Timmermans; (Perth)	
HB:	23. Matilda Sergeant; (Claremont)	14. Mackenzie Webb; (East Fremantle)	15. Annabel Johnson; (Subiaco)
C:	6. Ruby Sargent-Wilson; (Claremont)	27. Isabella Shannon; (Perth)	8. Lisa Steane; (Subiaco)
HF:	4. Lucy Greenwood; (East Perth)	13. Courtney Lindgren; (Subiaco)	5. Paige Sheppard; (Subiaco)
F:	31. Krstel Petrevski; (Subiaco)	19. Poppy Stockwell; (Perth)	
Foll:	25. Lauren Quaife; (Swan Districts)	1. Jayme Harken (c); (Claremont)	11. Jaime Henry; (Swan Districts)
Int:	17. Juliet Kelly; (Claremont)	12. Holly Britton; (Perth)	16. Jess Freame; (Claremont)
Int:	2. Natasha Entwistle; (South Fremantle)	10. Makaela Tuhakaraina; (South Fremantle)	22. Jae Flynn; (East Fremantle)
Coach:	Jack Schwarze (Claremont)		

== See also ==
- 2026 WAFL season
