= 2022 AFL draft =

Draft for the Australian Football League

General information
- Dates: 1 June: Mid-season Draft; 28–29 November: National Draft; 30 November: Pre-Season and Rookie Draft
- Location: Marvel Stadium
- Network: Fox Footy
- Sponsored by: National Australia Bank

Overview
- League: AFL
- First selection: Aaron Cadman, Greater Western Sydney

The 2022 AFL draft consisted of the various periods where the 18 clubs in the Australian Football League (AFL) could trade and recruit players during and following the completion of the 2022 AFL season.

== 2022 COVID-19 top-up players ==
Due to the league wanting to ensure that matches were not cancelled or postponed during the ongoing COVID-19 pandemic, each club named twenty players to a COVID-19 top-up player list. For Victorian based teams, all of these players played for their affiliated reserves teams or junior development academies; for clubs outside of Victoria, the majority were sourced from the local second-level leagues.

West Coast was the only club to utilise the top-up player pool, on two occasions when Western Australia's health and safety protocols – which were more stringent than in other states – saw multiple senior players unavailable. Six total players were used by West Coast as top-ups: Angus Dewar, Aaron Black, Stefan Giro, Declan Mountford, Brayden Ainsworth, and Jake Florenca.

== Key dates ==
Table of key dates
Event	Date(s)
Mid-season rookie draft	1 June 2022
Free agency period	Restricted and Unrestricted: 30 September – 7 October 2022; Delisted: 3 – 15 November
Trade period	3 – 12 October 2022
National draft	First round: 28 November 2022; Second and subsequent rounds: 29 November 2022
Pre-Season and Rookie draft	30 November 2022
Pre-season supplemental selection period	1 December 2022 – 15 February 2023

== 2022 mid-season rookie draft ==
The mid-season draft was held after the conclusion of Round 11 of the 2022 AFL season on 1 June. The draft was only open to clubs with inactive players on their list and vacancies available, such as long-term injuries or retirements.

Mid-season draft selections
Round	Pick	Player	Club	Recruited from		Pick due to
Round	Pick	Player	Club	Club	League	Pick due to
1	1	Jai Culley	West Coast	Dandenong Stingrays	NAB League	Oscar Allen long-term injury
1	2	Kallan Dawson	North Melbourne	Williamstown	VFL	Miller Bergman long-term injury
1	3	Massimo D'Ambrosio	Essendon	Richmond	VFL	Anthony McDonald-Tipungwuti retirement
1	4	Brett Turner	Adelaide	Glenelg	SANFL	Rory Sloane long-term injury
1	5	Wade Derksen	Greater Western Sydney	Peel Thunder	WAFL	Josh Fahey long-term injury
1	6	Max Ramsden	Hawthorn	Sandringham Dragons	NAB League	Passed selection at the 2021 Rookie Draft
1	7	Oskar Faulkhead	Gold Coast	Geelong	VFL	Ben King long-term injury
1	8	Brynn Teakle	Port Adelaide	East Fremantle	WAFL	Jake Pasini long-term injury
1	9	Josh Carmichael	Collingwood	West Adelaide	SANFL	Nathan Kreuger long-term injury
1	10	Jacob Bauer	Richmond	North Adelaide	SANFL	Josh Caddy retirement
1	11	Hugo Hall-Kahan	Sydney	Sandringham Dragons	NAB League	Passed selection at the 2021 Rookie Draft
1	12	Zane Williams	Geelong	Woodville-West Torrens	SANFL	Passed selection at the 2021 Rookie Draft
1	13	Sam Durdin	Carlton	Glenelg	SANFL	Liam Jones inactive
1	14	Passed	St Kilda	—	—	Nick Coffield long-term injury
1	15	Sebit Kuek	Fremantle	East Perth	WAFL	Luke Valente retirement
2	16	Passed	West Coast	—	—	Luke Edwards long-term injury
2	17	Passed	North Melbourne	—	—	Tom Lynch retirement
2	18	Jye Menzie	Essendon	South Adelaide	SANFL	Nik Cox long-term injury
2	19	Passed	Adelaide	—	—	Paul Seedsman long-term injury
2	20	James Blanck	Hawthorn	Box Hill Hawks	VFL	Tyler Brockman long-term injury
2	21	Passed	Collingwood	—	—	Jordan Roughead retirement
2	22	Will Hayes	Carlton	Carlton	VFL	Oscar McDonald long-term injury
2	23	Passed	Fremantle	—	—	Jye Amiss long-term injury

== Previous trades ==
Table of previously traded selections
Rd	Orig. Club	New Club	Acquired via	Ref
1	Melbourne	Sydney	via Adelaide (pick swap) on-traded to Sydney (Jordan Dawson trade)	
2	Collingwood	Gold Coast	Pick swap	
2	Fremantle	Gold Coast	Will Brodie trade	
2	North Melbourne	Richmond	Callum Coleman-Jones and Robbie Tarrant trade	
2	Port Adelaide	West Coast	Pick swap at the 2021 National Draft	
3	Collingwood	Gold Coast	Pick swap	
3	Port Adelaide	Brisbane Lions	via Greater Western Sydney (Jeremy Finlayson trade) on-traded to Brisbane Lions (pick swap)	
3	Fremantle	Hawthorn	via Collingwood (pick swap) on-traded to Hawthorn (Max Lynch trade)	
3	Carlton	Geelong	via Fremantle (Adam Cerra trade) on-traded to Geelong (Jordan Clark trade)	
3	Brisbane Lions	Geelong	via Geelong (Darcy Fort trade) on-traded to Hawthorn (Jonathon Ceglar trade) on-traded to Collingwood (Max Lynch trade) on-traded to Geelong (pick swap at the 2021 National Draft)	
3	Sydney	Port Adelaide	Peter Ladhams trade	
3	Hawthorn	Collingwood	Max Lynch trade	
3	North Melbourne	Western Bulldogs	Pick swap at the 2021 National Draft	
3	Richmond	Collingwood	Pick swap at the 2021 National Draft	
3	Western Bulldogs	Collingwood	via North Melbourne (pick swap at the 2021 National Draft) on-traded to Collingwood (pick swap at the 2021 National Draft)	
3	Adelaide	Melbourne	Pick swap at the 2021 National Draft	
4	Collingwood	Gold Coast	Pick swap	
4	Gold Coast	Hawthorn	via Collingwood (pick swap) on-traded to Hawthorn (Max Lynch trade)	
4	Adelaide	Greater Western Sydney	via St Kilda (pick swap) on-traded to Collingwood (pick swap) on-traded to Greater Western Sydney (pick swap at the 2021 National Draft)	
4	Fremantle	Gold Coast	Will Brodie trade	
4	Richmond	North Melbourne	Callum Coleman-Jones and Robbie Tarrant trade	
4	Hawthorn	Geelong	Jonathon Ceglar trade	
4	Geelong	Fremantle	Jordan Clark trade	
4	Port Adelaide	Carlton	Pick swap at the 2021 National Draft	
4	St Kilda	Melbourne	Pick swap at the 2021 National Draft	
4	West Coast	Port Adelaide	Pick swap at the 2021 National Draft	

== Player movements ==
=== Free agency ===
2022 AFL free agency period signings
Player	Free agent type	Recruited from	New club	Compensation	Ref
Karl Amon	Unrestricted	Port Adelaide	Hawthorn	Second round	
Jayden Hunt	Unrestricted	Melbourne	West Coast	Third round	
Daniel McStay	Unrestricted	Brisbane Lions	Collingwood	Second round	
Liam Jones	Unrestricted	Carlton	Western Bulldogs	Third round	
Zaine Cordy	Unrestricted	Western Bulldogs	St Kilda	None ^{[a]}	
Francis Evans	Delisted	Geelong	Port Adelaide	—N/a	
Fergus Greene ^{[b]}	Delisted	Box Hill Hawks (VFL)	Hawthorn	—N/a	

- ^{a} Western Bulldogs received no compensation pick for Zaine Cordy due to signing Liam Jones
- ^{b} Fergus Greene was delisted by Western Bulldogs in 2020

=== Trades ===
Table of trades
Clubs involved	Trade		Ref
Collingwood Greater Western Sydney	to Collingwood (from Greater Western Sydney): Bobby Hill; pick No. 40	to Greater Western Sydney (from Collingwood): pick No. 43; 2023 second round pick (Collingwood)	
Richmond; Greater Western Sydney	to Richmond (from Greater Western Sydney): Tim Taranto	to Greater Western Sydney (from Richmond): pick No. 12; pick No. 19	
Carlton Fremantle	to Carlton (from Fremantle): Blake Acres	to Fremantle (from Carlton): 2023 third round pick (Carlton)	
Melbourne; Port Adelaide	to Melbourne (from Port Adelaide): pick No. 27	to Port Adelaide (from Melbourne): pick No. 33; pick No. 43; pick No. 54	
North Melbourne Fremantle	to North Melbourne (from Fremantle): Griffin Logue; Darcy Tucker; 2023 third round pick (Fremantle)	to Fremantle (from North Melbourne): 2023 second round priority pick (North Melbourne); 2023 third round priority pick (North Melbourne); 2023 fourth round pick (North Melbourne)	
Greater Western Sydney; Brisbane Lions	to Greater Western Sydney (from Brisbane Lions): pick No. 15	to Brisbane Lions (from Greater Western Sydney): pick No. 21; 2023 second round pick (Greater Western Sydney)	
Gold Coast St Kilda	to Gold Coast (from St Kilda): Ben Long; 2023 fourth round pick (St Kilda)	to St Kilda (from Gold Coast): pick No. 32	
Gold Coast; Brisbane Lions	to Gold Coast (from Brisbane Lions): Tom Berry; pick No. 46; 2023 second round pick (Greater Western Sydney)	to Brisbane Lions (from Gold Coast): pick No. 25; pick No. 36; pick No. 56	
Fremantle Gold Coast	to Fremantle (from Gold Coast): Josh Corbett	to Gold Coast (from Fremantle): 2023 fourth round pick (Fremantle)	
Geelong; Greater Western Sydney	to Geelong (from Greater Western Sydney): Tanner Bruhn	to Greater Western Sydney (from Geelong): pick No. 18	
Geelong Brisbane Lions	to Geelong (from Brisbane Lions): pick No. 25	to Brisbane Lions (from Geelong): pick No. 38; pick No. 48; pick No. 55; 2023 second round pick (Geelong); 2023 fourth round pick (Geelong)	
Greater Western Sydney; Melbourne	to Greater Western Sydney (from Melbourne): Toby Bedford	to Melbourne (from Greater Western Sydney): pick No. 44	
Fremantle Melbourne	to Fremantle (from Melbourne): Luke Jackson; pick No. 44; pick No. 67	to Melbourne (from Fremantle): pick No. 13; 2023 first round pick (Fremantle); 2023 second round pick (Fremantle)	
Essendon; Carlton	to Essendon (from Carlton): Will Setterfield; pick No. 68	to Carlton (from Essendon): 2023 fourth round pick (Essendon)	
Adelaide Gold Coast	to Adelaide (from Gold Coast): Izak Rankine; pick No. 46; 2023 fourth round pick (Fremantle)	to Gold Coast (from Adelaide): pick No. 5; 2023 third round pick (Adelaide); 2023 fourth round pick (Adelaide)	
Port Adelaide; North Melbourne; West Coast; Greater Western Sydney	to Port Adelaide: Jason Horne-Francis (from North Melbourne); Junior Rioli (from West Coast); 2023 second round pick (Collingwood, from Greater Western Sydney); 2023 third round pick (Fremantle, from North Melbourne); to North Melbourne: pick No. 2 (from West Coast); pick No. 3 (from Greater Western Sydney); pick No. 40 (from West Coast); pick No. 43 (from Port Adelaide); 2023 first round pick (from Port Adelaide)	to West Coast: pick No. 8 (from Port Adelaide); pick No. 12 (from Greater Western Sydney); 2023 second round pick (from Port Adelaide); 2023 third round pick (from Port Adelaide); to Greater Western Sydney: pick No. 1 (from North Melbourne); pick No. 53 (from Port Adelaide); pick No. 57 (from Port Adelaide)	
Brisbane Lions Hawthorn	to Brisbane Lions (from Hawthorn): Jack Gunston	to Hawthorn (from Brisbane Lions): pick No. 48; 2023 fourth round pick (Brisbane Lions)	
Melbourne; Collingwood	to Melbourne (from Collingwood): Brodie Grundy	to Collingwood (from Melbourne): pick No. 27	
Geelong Gold Coast	to Geelong (from Gold Coast): Jack Bowes; pick No. 7	to Gold Coast (from Geelong): 2023 third round pick (Geelong)	
Collingwood; Adelaide	to Collingwood (from Adelaide): Billy Frampton	to Adelaide (from Collingwood): 2023 third round pick (Collingwood)	
Richmond Greater Western Sydney	to Richmond (from Greater Western Sydney): Jacob Hopper; pick No. 53; pick No. 63	to Greater Western Sydney (from Richmond): pick No. 31; 2023 first round pick (Richmond)	
Sydney; Essendon	to Sydney (from Essendon): Aaron Francis; pick No. 42	to Essendon (from Sydney): pick No. 37; 2023 fourth round pick (Sydney)	
Essendon Melbourne	to Essendon (from Melbourne): Sam Weideman; pick No. 54; pick No. 72	to Melbourne (from Essendon): pick No. 37	
Melbourne; Western Bulldogs	to Melbourne (from Western Bulldogs): Josh Schache	to Western Bulldogs (from Melbourne): 2023 fourth round pick (Melbourne)	
Melbourne Western Bulldogs	to Melbourne (from Western Bulldogs): Lachie Hunter	to Western Bulldogs (from Melbourne): 2023 third round pick (Melbourne)	
Brisbane Lions; Western Bulldogs	to Brisbane Lions (from Western Bulldogs): Josh Dunkley; 2023 third round pick (Melbourne); 2023 third round pick (Western Bulldogs)	to Western Bulldogs (from Brisbane Lions): pick No. 21; 2023 first round pick (Brisbane Lions); 2023 second round pick (Brisbane Lions); 2023 fourth round pick (Geelong)	
Collingwood Hawthorn Geelong	to Collingwood: Tom Mitchell (from Hawthorn); pick No. 25 (from Geelong); to Geelong: Oliver Henry (from Collingwood)	to Hawthorn: Cooper Stephens (from Geelong); pick No. 41 (from Collingwood); pick No. 50 (from Collingwood)	
Western Bulldogs; Fremantle	to Western Bulldogs (from Fremantle): Rory Lobb	to Fremantle (from Western Bulldogs): pick No. 30; 2023 second round pick (Western Bulldogs)	
Fremantle Hawthorn	to Fremantle (from Hawthorn): Jaeger O'Meara; 2023 fourth round pick (Hawthorn)	to Hawthorn (from Fremantle): Lloyd Meek; 2023 second round pick (Western Bulldogs)	
Adelaide; Brisbane Lions	to Adelaide (from Brisbane Lions): pick No. 56	to Brisbane Lions (from Adelaide): 2023 fourth round pick (Fremantle)	
Adelaide North Melbourne	to Adelaide (from North Melbourne): pick No. 59; 2023 second round pick (North Melbourne)	to North Melbourne (from Adelaide): pick 23	
Fremantle; North Melbourne	to Fremantle (from North Melbourne): pick No. 43	to North Melbourne (from Fremantle): 2023 fourth round pick (Hawthorn)	
Picks swapped at the 2022 National Draft
Brisbane Lions; Hawthorn	to Brisbane Lions (from Hawthorn): pick No. 41; pick No. 50; pick No. 52; pick No. 63	to Hawthorn (from Brisbane Lions): pick No. 36; 2023 third round pick (Western Bulldogs)	
Brisbane Lions North Melbourne	to Brisbane Lions (from North Melbourne): pick No. 40	to North Melbourne (from Brisbane Lions): pick No. 63; 2023 third round pick (Melbourne)	
Hawthorn; Sydney	to Hawthorn (from Sydney): pick No. 18	to Sydney (from Hawthorn): pick No. 27; 2023 second round pick (Hawthorn); 2023 third round pick (Hawthorn)	
Carlton Collingwood	to Carlton (from Collingwood): pick No. 30	to Collingwood (from Carlton): 2023 second round pick (Carlton)	
Adelaide; Gold Coast	to Adelaide (from Gold Coast): pick No. 43; 2023 second round pick (Gold Coast); 2023 third round pick (Geelong)	to Gold Coast (from Adelaide): pick No. 79; 2023 second round pick (Adelaide); 2023 third round pick (Collingwood)	
Adelaide Brisbane Lions	to Adelaide (from Brisbane Lions): pick No. 50	to Brisbane Lions (from Adelaide): 2023 third round pick (Geelong)	
Hawthorn; Greater Western Sydney	to Hawthorn (from Greater Western Sydney): pick No. 51	to Greater Western Sydney (from Hawthorn): 2023 fourth round pick (Brisbane Lions)	

== List changes ==
=== Retirements ===
Table key
R	Rookie listed player
B	Category B Rookie listed player

Table of player retirements
Name	Club	Ref
Brad Sheppard	West Coast	
Mark Keane (R)	Collingwood	
Luke Valente	Fremantle	
Josh Caddy	Richmond	
Jordan Roughead	Collingwood	
Tom Lynch	North Melbourne	
Josiah Kyle (B)	St Kilda	
Majak Daw (R)	Melbourne	
Jarryn Geary	St Kilda	
Kane Lambert	Richmond	
Matthew Parker	Richmond	
David Mundy	Fremantle	
Steven Motlop	Port Adelaide	
Josh J. Kennedy	West Coast	
Josh P. Kennedy	Sydney	
Ben McEvoy	Hawthorn	
Matt de Boer	Greater Western Sydney	
Devon Smith	Essendon	
Robbie Gray	Port Adelaide	
Shane Edwards	Richmond	
Michael Hurley	Essendon	
Dan Hannebery	St Kilda	
Dean Kent	St Kilda	
Paddy Ryder	St Kilda	
Callum Sinclair	Sydney	
Colin O'Riordan	Sydney	
Liam Shiels	Hawthorn	
Luke Brown	Adelaide	
Mitch Robinson	Brisbane Lions	
Shaun Higgins	Geelong	
Mitch Brown (R)	Melbourne	
Joel Selwood	Geelong	
Luke Dahlhaus	Geelong	
Jack Redden	West Coast	
Stefan Martin	Western Bulldogs	
Rory Thompson	Gold Coast	

=== Delistings ===
Table key
R	Rookie listed player
B	Category B Rookie listed player

Table of player delistings
Name	Club	Ref
Tom Williamson	Carlton	
Sam Mayes	Port Adelaide	
Sam Skinner	Port Adelaide	
Taj Schofield (R)	Port Adelaide	
Tom Cutler	Essendon	
Garrett McDonagh	Essendon	
Tom Hird (B)	Essendon	
Jack Newnes	Carlton	
Oscar McDonald (R)	Carlton	
Luke Parks (R)	Carlton	
Darragh Joyce (R)	St Kilda	
Kyron Hayden	North Melbourne	
Matthew McGuinness (B)	North Melbourne	
Patrick Walker (R)	North Melbourne	
Daniel Howe	Hawthorn	
Tom Phillips	Hawthorn	
Connor Downie	Hawthorn	
Jackson Callow (R)	Hawthorn	
Liam Stocker	Carlton	
Will Hayes (R)	Carlton	
Kyle Hartigan	Hawthorn	
Rhys Nicholls (R)	Gold Coast	
Jez McLennan (R)	Gold Coast	
Matt Conroy (R)	Gold Coast	
Patrick Murtagh (R)	Gold Coast	
Fraser Rosman	Melbourne	
Callum Brown	Collingwood	
Tyler Brown	Collingwood	
Isaac Chugg (R)	Collingwood	
Liam McMahon	Collingwood	
Connor Blakely (R)	Fremantle	
Joel Western	Fremantle	
Jackson Nelson	West Coast	
Hugh Dixon (R)	West Coast	
Tom Joyce (R)	West Coast	
Zach Sproule (R)	Greater Western Sydney	
Jake Stein (R)	Greater Western Sydney	
Jarrod Brander	Greater Western Sydney	
Ely Smith	Brisbane Lions	
Mitchell Cox (R)	Brisbane Lions	
Deividas Uosis (B)	Brisbane Lions	
Quinton Narkle	Geelong	
Francis Evans	Geelong	
Nick Stevens	Geelong	
Paul Tsapatolis (B)	Geelong	
Zane Williams (R)	Geelong	
Lewis Taylor (R)	Sydney	
Barry O'Connor (B)	Sydney	
Oskar Baker	Melbourne	
Jake Aarts (R)	Richmond	
Sydney Stack (R)	Richmond	
Riley Collier-Dawkins	Richmond	
Will Martyn	Richmond	
Martin Frederick	Port Adelaide	
Dylan Williams	Port Adelaide	
Mitch Crowden (R)	Fremantle	
James Rowe	Adelaide	
Ben Davis (R)	Adelaide	
Brett Turner (R)	Adelaide	
Louis Butler	Western Bulldogs	
Charlie Parker (R)	Western Bulldogs	
Mitch Wallis	Western Bulldogs	
Jed Anderson	North Melbourne	
Atu Bosenavulagi	North Melbourne	
Kayne Turner	North Melbourne	
Josh Walker	North Melbourne	
Jack Saunders (R)	Hawthorn	
Jack Madgen (B)	Collingwood	
Caleb Poulter	Collingwood	
Cooper Murley	Collingwood	
Alec Waterman (R)	Essendon	
Cody Brand	Essendon	
Brayden Ham	Essendon	
Jarrod Lienert (R)	St Kilda	
Connor McFadyen	Brisbane Lions	
Nakia Cockatoo	Brisbane Lions	
Ryan Lester	Brisbane Lions	
Zac Langdon	West Coast	
Oleg Markov	Gold Coast	
Sam Naismith	Sydney	
James Bell	Sydney	
Ben Ronke	Sydney	
Zane Trew	West Coast	
Isiah Winder	West Coast	
Jared Polec	North Melbourne	
Paul Seedsman	Adelaide	
Andrew McPherson	Adelaide	
Seamus Mitchell	Hawthorn	
Josh Eyre	Essendon	

== North Melbourne concessions ==
Due to the club's poor on-field results since 2020, the AFL announced draft concessions for North Melbourne which included:

- A second-round pick and third-round pick in the 2023 AFL draft: at least one of these picks must be traded for a player during the 2022 trade period.
  - North Melbourne will not carry the picks into 2023, but they will be tied to their finishing position.
- Two extra Category A Rookie list spots.

== 2022 national draft ==
^	Denotes player who has been inducted to the Australian Football Hall of Fame
*	Denotes player who has been a premiership player and been selected for at least one All-Australian team
^{+}	Denotes player who has been a premiership player at least once
^{x}	Denotes player who has been selected for at least one All-Australian team
^{#}	Denotes player who has never played in a VFL/AFL home and away season or finals game
^{~}	Denotes player who has been selected as Rising Star

Table of national draft selections
Round	Pick	Player	Club	Recruited from		Notes
Round	Pick	Player	Club	Club	League	Notes
1	1	Aaron Cadman	Greater Western Sydney	Greater Western Victoria Rebels	NAB League	←North Melbourne
1	2	Will Ashcroft	Brisbane Lions	Sandringham Dragons	NAB League	Father–son selection (son of Marcus Ashcroft), matched bid by North Melbourne
1	3	Harry Sheezel	North Melbourne	Sandringham Dragons	NAB League	←West Coast
1	4	George Wardlaw	North Melbourne	Oakleigh Chargers	NAB League	←Greater Western Sydney
1	5	Elijah Tsatas	Essendon	Oakleigh Chargers	NAB League	
1	6	Bailey Humphrey	Gold Coast	Gippsland Power	NAB League	←Adelaide
1	7	Cameron Mackenzie	Hawthorn	Sandringham Dragons	NAB League	
1	8	Jhye Clark	Geelong	Geelong Falcons	NAB League	←Gold Coast
1	9	Reuben Ginbey	West Coast	East Perth	WAFL	←Port Adelaide
1	10	Mattaes Phillipou	St Kilda	Woodville-West Torrens	SANFL	
1	11	Oliver Hollands	Carlton	Murray Bushrangers	NAB League	
1	12	Jaspa Fletcher	Brisbane Lions	Sherwood Magpies	QAFL	Father–son selection (son of Adrian Fletcher), matched bid by Western Bulldogs
1	13	Jedd Busslinger	Western Bulldogs	East Perth	WAFL	
1	14	Elijah Hewett	West Coast	Swan Districts	WAFL	←Greater Western Sydney←Richmond
1	15	Matthew Jefferson	Melbourne	Oakleigh Chargers	NAB League	←Fremantle
1	16	Harry Rowston	Greater Western Sydney	Calder Cannons	NAB League	Academy selection, matched bid by Sydney
1	17	Max Michalanney	Adelaide	Norwood	SANFL	Father–son selection (son of Jim Michalanney), matched bid by Sydney
1	18	Josh Weddle	Hawthorn	Oakleigh Chargers	NAB League	←Sydney (draft)←Adelaide (2021)←Melbourne (2021)
1	19	Ed Allan	Collingwood	Claremont	WAFL	
1	20	Jacob Konstanty	Sydney	Gippsland Power	NAB League	
1	21	Darcy Jones	Greater Western Sydney	Swan Districts	WAFL	←Geelong
2	22	Max Gruzewski	Greater Western Sydney	Oakleigh Chargers	NAB League	←Richmond←North Melbourne (2021)
2	23	Harry Barnett	West Coast	West Adelaide	SANFL	
2	24	Charlie Clarke	Western Bulldogs	Sandringham Dragons	NAB League	←Brisbane Lions←Greater Western Sydney
2	25	Lewis Hayes	Essendon	Eastern Ranges	NAB League	
2	26	Brayden George	North Melbourne	Murray Bushrangers	NAB League	←Adelaide
2	27	Cooper Vickery	Sydney	Gippsland Power	NAB League	←Hawthorn (draft)
2	28	Jakob Ryan	Collingwood	Glenelg	SANFL	←Geelong←Brisbane Lions←Gold Coast
2	29	Coby Burgiel	West Coast	Gippsland Power	NAB League	←Port Adelaide (2021)
2	30	Lachie Cowan	Carlton	Tasmania Devils	NAB League	←Collingwood (draft)←Melbourne←Port Adelaide free agency compensation pick (Amon)
2	31	James van Es	St Kilda	Greater Western Victoria Rebels	NAB League	
2	32	Jaxon Binns	Carlton	Dandenong Stingrays	NAB League	
2	33	Hugh Davies	Fremantle	Claremont	WAFL	←Western Bulldogs
2	34	Toby McMullin	Greater Western Sydney	Sandringham Dragons	NAB League	←Richmond
2	35	Olli Hotton	St Kilda	Sandringham Dragons	NAB League	←Gold Coast←Fremantle (2021)
2	36	Tom McCallum	Port Adelaide	Tasmania Devils	NAB League	←Melbourne
2	37	Henry Hustwaite	Hawthorn	Dandenong Stingrays	NAB League	←Brisbane Lions←Gold Coast←Collingwood (2021)
2	38	Jed Adams	Melbourne	Peel Thunder	WAFL	←Essendon←Sydney
3	39	Harvey Gallagher	Western Bulldogs	Bendigo Pioneers	NAB League	←North Melbourne (2021)
3	40	Caleb Mitchell	Sydney	Murray Bushrangers	NAB League	←Essendon
3	41	Tom Emmett	Fremantle	Sturt	SANFL	←North Melbourne←Port Adelaide←Melbourne←Adelaide (2021)
3	42	Max Knobel	Fremantle	Gippsland Power	NAB League	←Melbourne←Greater Western Sydney←Collingwood←Hawthorn (2021)
3	43	Billy Dowling	Adelaide	North Adelaide	SANFL	←Gold Coast (draft)
3	44	Isaac Keeler	St Kilda	North Adelaide	SANFL	
3	45	Alwyn Davey Jr.	Essendon	Oakleigh Chargers	NAB League	Father–son selection (son of Alwyn Davey), matched bid by Hawthorn
3	46	Jack O'Sullivan	Hawthorn	Oakleigh Chargers	NAB League	←Brisbane Lions←Geelong←Fremantle (2021)←Carlton (2021)
3	47	Harry Lemmey	Carlton	West Adelaide	SANFL	Free agency compensation pick (Jones)
3	48	Joe Richards	Collingwood	Wangaratta	O&MFNL	←Richmond (2021)
3	49	Kaleb Smith	Richmond	East Fremantle	WAFL	←Greater Western Sydney←Port Adelaide←Melbourne
3	50	Hugh Bond	Adelaide	Greater Western Victoria Rebels	NAB League	←Brisbane Lions (draft)←Geelong←Collingwood (2021)←Hawthorn (2021)←Geelong (2021)←Brisbane Lions (2021)
3	51	Bailey Macdonald	Hawthorn	Oakleigh Chargers	NAB League	←Greater Western Sydney (draft)←Port Adelaide←Sydney (2021)
3	52	Phoenix Foster	Geelong	Norwood	SANFL	
4	53	Thomas Scully	Port Adelaide	West Adelaide	SANFL	←West Coast (2021)
4	54	Jayden Davey	Essendon	Oakleigh Chargers	NAB League	Father–son selection (son of Alwyn Davey)
4	55	Steely Green	Richmond	South Fremantle	WAFL	←Greater Western Sydney←Collingwood (2021)←St Kilda (2021)←Adelaide (2021)
4	56	Cooper Harvey	North Melbourne	Northern Knights	NAB League	Father–son selection (son of Brent Harvey)
4	57	Corey Wagner	Fremantle	Port Melbourne	VFL	←Melbourne←St Kilda (2021)
4	58	Noah Long	West Coast	Bendigo Pioneers	NAB League	
4	59	Kyle Marshall	Port Adelaide	South Adelaide	SANFL	

=== Rookie elevations ===
Table of rookie elevations
Player	Club
Jordon Butts	Adelaide
Kieran Strachan	Adelaide
James Madden	Brisbane Lions
Matthew Owies	Carlton
Jack Ginnivan	Collingwood
John Noble	Collingwood
Sam Durham	Essendon
Nic Martin	Essendon
Lachie Schultz	Fremantle
Tom Atkins	Geelong
Brad Close	Geelong
Levi Casboult	Gold Coast
Ned Moyle	Gold Coast
Callum Brown	Greater Western Sydney
Lachlan Bramble	Hawthorn
Kade Chandler	Melbourne
Jake Pasini	Port Adelaide
Marlion Pickett	Richmond
Hayden McLean	Sydney
Sam Wicks	Sydney
Jamaine Jones	West Coast
Buku Khamis	Western Bulldogs
Jordon Sweet	Western Bulldogs

== 2023 rookie draft ==
Rookie draft selections
Round	Pick	Player	Club	Recruited from		Notes
Round	Pick	Player	Club	Club	League	Notes
1	1	Blake Drury	North Melbourne	Oakleigh Chargers	NAB League	
1	2	Isiah Winder	West Coast	West Coast	AFL	
1	3	Phil Davis	Greater Western Sydney	Greater Western Sydney	AFL	
1	4	Rhett Montgomerie	Essendon	Central District	SANFL	
1	5	Andrew McPherson	Adelaide	Adelaide	AFL	
1	6	Seamus Mitchell	Hawthorn	Hawthorn	AFL	
1	7	Connor Blakely	Gold Coast	Fremantle	AFL	
1	8	Dylan Williams	Port Adelaide	Port Adelaide	AFL	
1	9	Passed	St Kilda	—	—	
1	10	Ed Curnow	Carlton	Carlton	AFL	
1	11	Passed	Western Bulldogs	—	—	
1	12	Seth Campbell	Richmond	Tasmania Devils	NAB League	
1	13	Liam Reidy	Fremantle	Frankston	VFL	
1	14	Will Verrall	Melbourne	South Adelaide	SANFL	
1	15	Ryan Lester	Brisbane Lions	Brisbane Lions	AFL	
1	16	Cooper Murley	Collingwood	Collingwood	AFL	
1	17	Cameron Owen	Sydney	Tasmania Devils	NAB League	
1	18	Oscar Murdoch	Geelong	Geelong Falcons	NAB League	
2	19	Hamish Free	North Melbourne	South Fremantle	WAFL	
2	20	Zane Trew	West Coast	West Coast	AFL	
2	21	Paul Seedsman	Adelaide	Adelaide	AFL	
2	22	Passed	Hawthorn	—	—	
2	23	Jake Stein	Gold Coast	Greater Western Sydney	AFL	
2	24	Passed	St Kilda	—	—	
2	25	Passed	Western Bulldogs	—	—	
2	26	Tylar Young	Richmond	Richmond	VFL	
2	27	Passed	Fremantle	—	—	
2	28	Oliver Sestan	Melbourne	Mansfield	GVFNL	
2	29	Nakia Cockatoo	Brisbane Lions	Brisbane Lions	AFL	
2	30	Passed	Collingwood	—	—	
2	31	Jaiden Magor	Sydney	South Adelaide	SANFL	
2	32	Osca Riccardi	Geelong	Geelong Falcons	NAB League	Father–son selection (son of Peter Riccardi)
3	33	Daniel Howe	North Melbourne	Hawthorn	AFL	
3	34	Passed	Gold Coast	—	—	
3	35	Passed	Richmond	—	—	
3	36	Passed	Melbourne	—	—	
3	37	Passed	Brisbane Lions	—	—	
3	38	Passed	Geelong	—	—	
4	39	Kayne Turner	North Melbourne	North Melbourne	AFL	
4	40	Passed	Gold Coast	—	—	
5	41	Passed	Gold Coast	—	—	

=== Category B rookie selections ===
Table of Category B rookie selections
Name	Club	Origin	Note	Ref
Darryl McDowell-White Jr.	Brisbane Lions	Red City Roar (NBL1 North)	3-year non-registered player (basketball) (Also the son of Darryl White)	
Shadeau Brain	Brisbane Lions	Noosa (QAFL)	Academy selection	
Anthony Munkara	Essendon	West Adelaide (SANFL)	Next Generation Academy selection (Indigenous)	
Josh Draper	Fremantle	Peel Thunder (WAFL)	Next Generation Academy selection (Indigenous)	
Conrad Williams	Fremantle	Claremont (WAFL)	Next Generation Academy selection (Indigenous)	
Oisín Mullin	Geelong	Mayo (GAA)	International selection (Ireland)	
Ted Clohesy	Geelong	Geelong Falcons (NAB League)	Next Generation Academy selection (born in South Africa)	
Lloyd Johnston	Gold Coast	NT Thunder (NAB League)	NT zone selection	
Nicholas Madden	Greater Western Sydney	Greater Western Sydney (VFL)	Academy selection	
Jason Gillbee	Greater Western Sydney	Bendigo Pioneers (NAB League)	NSW zone selection	
Joshua Bennetts	Hawthorn	Eastern Ranges (NAB League)	Next Generation Academy selection (Indigenous)	
Kyah Farris-White	Melbourne	Willetton Tigers (NBL1 West)	3-year non-registered player (basketball)	
Nathan Barkla	Port Adelaide	Woodville-West Torrens (SANFL)	Next Generation Academy selection (Filipino descent)	
Angus McLennan	St Kilda	Sandringham Dragons (NAB League)	Next Generation Academy selection (born in Egypt)	
Will Edwards	Sydney	Sydney (VFL)	Academy selection	
Tyrell Dewar	West Coast	Subiaco (WAFL)	Next Generation Academy selection (Indigenous)	
Jordyn Baker	West Coast	East Perth (WAFL)	Next Generation Academy selection (Indigenous)	
James O'Donnell	Western Bulldogs	Essendon Cricket Club	3-year non-registered player (cricket)	

=== Pre-season supplemental selection period ===
Table of Pre-season supplemental selection period signings
Player	Club	Recruited from		Notes	Ref
Player	Club	Club	League	Notes	Ref
Tyler Brown	Adelaide	Collingwood	AFL		
Mark Keane	Adelaide	Cork	GAA	Previously listed with Collingwood	
Darragh Joyce	Brisbane Lions	St Kilda	AFL		
Conor McKenna	Brisbane Lions	Tyrone	GAA	Previously listed with Essendon	
Hudson O'Keeffe	Carlton	Oakleigh Chargers	NAB League		
Alex Cincotta	Carlton	Carlton	VFL		
Oscar Steene	Collingwood	West Adelaide	SANFL		
Oleg Markov	Collingwood	Gold Coast	AFL		
Jed Anderson	Gold Coast	North Melbourne	AFL		
Brodie McLaughlin	Gold Coast	Frankston	VFL		
Kye Turner	Melbourne	Frankston	VFL		
Liam Shiels	North Melbourne	Hawthorn	AFL		
Kaelan Bradtke	Richmond	Sydney	VFL		
Liam Stocker	St Kilda	Carlton	AFL		
Anthony Caminiti	St Kilda	Northern Knights	NAB League		
Oskar Baker	Western Bulldogs	Melbourne	AFL		

== See also ==
- 2022 AFL Women's draft
