= Harry Barnett (disambiguation) =

Harry Barnett may refer to:

- Harry Barnett (footballer, born 1898) (1898-1992), English footballer, see List of Bury F.C. players (1–24 appearances)
- Harry Barnett (born 2004), Australian rules footballer
