= Ashley Sharp =

Australian rules footballer

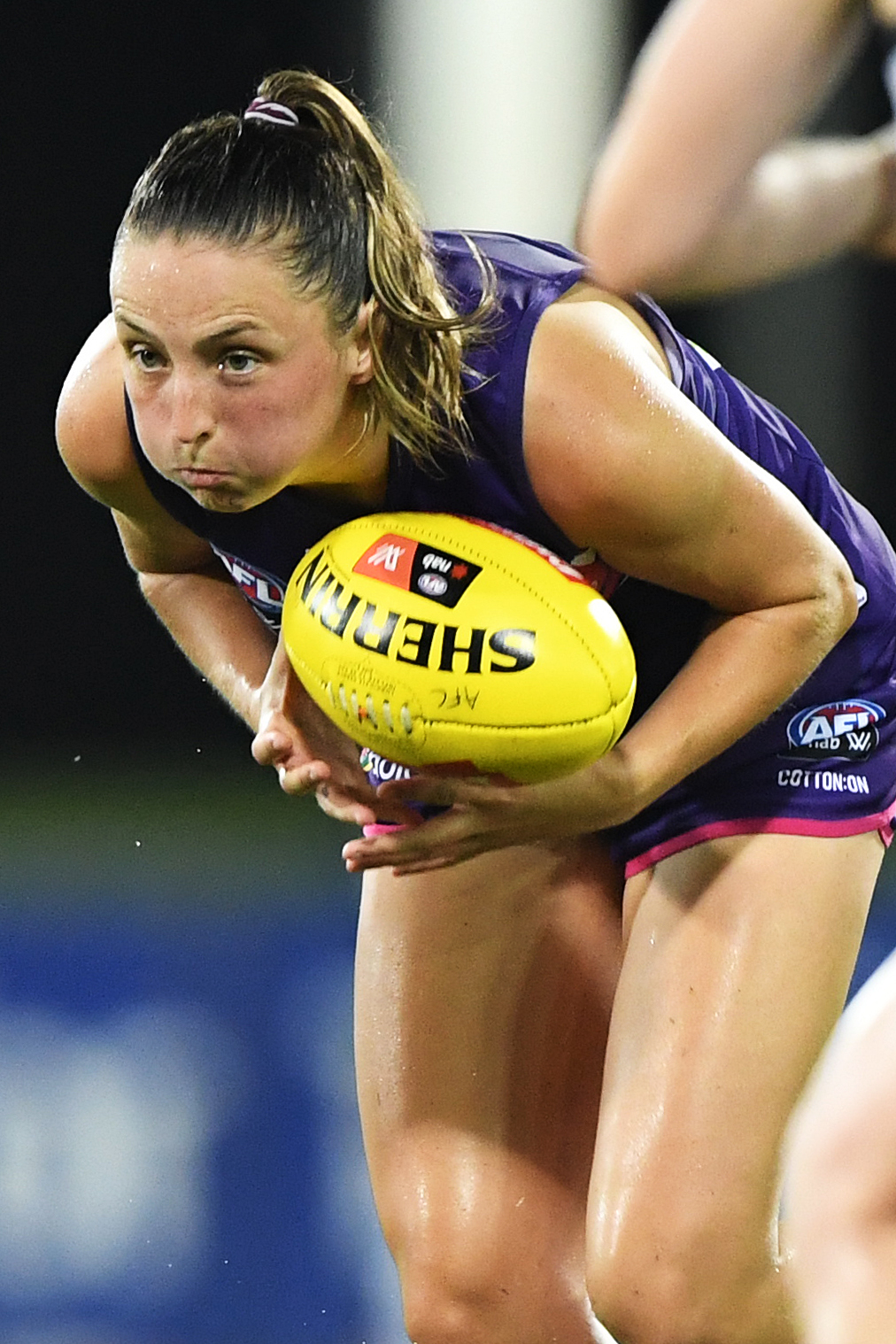
- Sharp playing for Fremantle in January 2019

Personal information
- Born: 11 June 1997 (age 29)
- Original team: Swan Districts (WAWFL)
- Draft: No. 20, 2016 AFL Women's draft
- Debut: Round 1, 2017, Fremantle vs. Western Bulldogs, at VU Whitten Oval
- Height: 171 cm (5 ft 7 in)
- Position: Forward

Playing career^{1}
Years	Club	Games (Goals)
2017–S7 (2022)	Fremantle	34 (25)
- ^{1} Playing statistics correct to the end of the S7 (2022) season.

Career highlights
- Fremantle leading goalkicker: 2017

Ashley Sharp (born 11 June 1997) is an Australian rules footballer who played for the Fremantle Football Club in the AFL Women's competition. Sharp was drafted by Fremantle with their third selection and twentieth overall in the 2016 AFL Women's draft. She made her debut in the thirty-two point loss to the Western Bulldogs at VU Whitten Oval in the opening round of the 2017 season. After the round three match against Greater Western Sydney, in which she recorded nine disposals and three goals, she was announced as the round nominee for the AFL Women's Rising Star. She played every match in her debut season to finish with seven matches.

In December 2022, Sharp decided to step away from football to focus on her family.

Off the field, Sharp plays in the State Basketball League, having played for the East Perth Eagles in 2016 and 2017 before joining the Kalamunda Eastern Suns in 2018.

September 2022, Sharp was appointed the Head Coach of the WAFLW Development programme.
