= Dhara Kerr Award =

Award in the WAFLW

- Awarded for: The best and fairest player in the WAFL Women's
- Country: Australia
- Presented by: WAFLW
- First award: 2019
- Currently held by: Jaime Henry (Swan Districts)
- Website: https://www.wafl.com.au

The Dhara Kerr Medal is awarded to the best and fairest player in the WAFL Women's (WAFLW) during the home-and-away season, as determined by votes cast by the officiating field umpires after each game. The award was part of the original West Australian Women's Football League competition and was carried over to the WAFLW when it commenced in 2019. Kerr was born in Warrnambool, Victoria in 1971 and died in Perth in 1995, three years after she had relocated to Western Australia and begun playing football for Innaloo.

== Criteria ==
=== Voting procedure ===
To determine the best player, the three field umpires (not the goal umpires or boundary umpires) confer after each home-and-away match and award three votes, two votes and one vote to the players they regard as the best, second-best and third-best in the match, respectively. On the awards night, the votes from each match are tallied, and the player or players with the highest number of votes is awarded the medal (subject to eligibility – see below).

The current voting system, which is the same as that of similar awards such as the Australian Football League (AFL)'s Brownlow Medal or the AFL Women's best and fairest, has been used since the award's inception in the WAFLW. If two or more eligible players score the equal highest number of votes, each wins the medal.

=== Ineligibility ===
The fairest component of the trophy is achieved by making ineligible any player who is suspended by the WAFL Tribunal during the home-and-away season. An ineligible player cannot win the award, regardless of the number of votes she has received.

A player remains eligible for the award under the following circumstances:

- she is suspended during the finals or pre-season;
- she serves a suspension in the current season which carried on from, or was earned for an offence committed in, the previous season;
- she receives any sort of club-imposed suspension which is not recognised by the VFL Tribunal;
- she is found guilty by the VFL Tribunal of an offence which attracts only a financial penalty.

Umpires cast their votes for each game independent of eligibility criteria of the players; i.e. umpires can cast votes for players who have already been suspended during that season if they perceive them to be amongst the best on the ground.

== Winners ==
Season	Player	Club	Votes	Ref.
2019	Hayley Miller	Subiaco	13	
2019	Danika Pisconeri	Subiaco	13	
2020	Danika Pisconeri (2)	Subiaco	9	
2021	Ella Smith	Claremont	15	
2022	Sharon Wong	East Fremantle	18	
2023	Jayme Harken	Claremont	24	
2024	Jayme Harken (2)	Claremont	27	
2025	Krstel Petrevski	Subiaco	26	
2026	Jaime Henry	Swan Districts	35	

== Records ==
Winners who also won a premiership in the same season

- Jayme Harken, Claremont (2024)

Winners who also led the league goalkicking in the same season

- None

== See also ==
- Sandover Medal
- AFL Women's best and fairest
