= Charlie Clarke (footballer, born 2004) =

Australian rules footballer

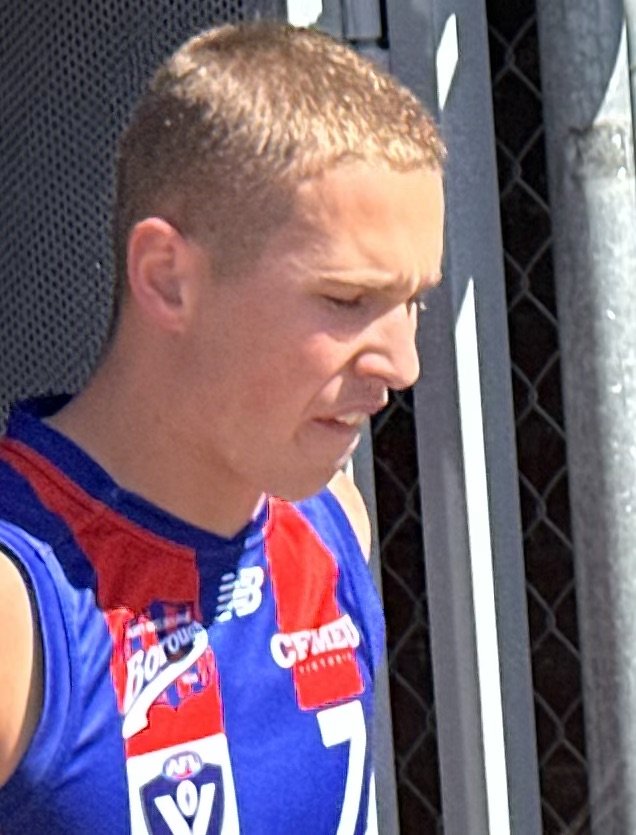
- Clarke in April 2026

Personal information
- Nickname: Chook
- Born: 4 January 2004 (age 22)
- Original teams: Sandringham Dragons (Talent League); Port Melbourne Colts (SFL)
- Draft: No. 24, 2022 national draft
- Debut: Round 8, 2024, Western Bulldogs vs. Hawthorn, at Docklands Stadium
- Height: 183 cm (6 ft 0 in)
- Weight: 80 kg (176 lb)
- Position: Forward

Playing career^{1}
| Years | Club | Games (Goals) |
| 2024 | Western Bulldogs | 1 (0) |
- ^{1} Playing statistics correct to the end of 2024.

Charlie Clarke (born 4 January 2004) is a former professional Australian rules footballer who played for the Western Bulldogs in the Australian Football League (AFL).

== AFL career ==
Clarke was selected by the Western Bulldogs with the 24th pick in the 2022 national draft.

Following strong form for the Bulldog's Victorian Football League (VFL) affiliate Footscray, Clarke made his AFL debut in round 8 of the 2024 AFL season, against the Hawthorn Football Club at Docklands Stadium.

He was delisted at the conclusion of the 2024 season, despite a successful VFL campaign in which he kicked 22 goals and Footscray played in a preliminary final.

== Statistics ==
Statistics are correct to the end of the 2024 season.

Legend
| G | Goals | K | Kicks | D | Disposals | T | Tackles |
| B | Behinds | H | Handballs | M | Marks |

| Season | Team | No. | Games | Totals | | | | | | | Averages (per game) | | | | | | |
| Season | Team | No. | Games | G | B | K | H | D | M | T | G | B | K | H | D | M | T |
|---|---|---|---|---|---|---|---|---|---|---|---|---|---|---|---|---|---|
| 2023 | Western Bulldogs | 8 | 0 | – | – | – | – | – | – | – | – | – | – | – | – | – | – |
| 2024 | Western Bulldogs | 8 | 1 | 0 | 1 | 5 | 1 | 6 | 2 | 0 | 0.0 | 1.0 | 5.0 | 1.0 | 6.0 | 2.0 | 0.0 |
| Career | | | 1 | 0 | 1 | 5 | 1 | 6 | 2 | 0 | 1.0 | 0.0 | 5.0 | 1.0 | 6.0 | 2.0 | 0.0 |

== Personal life ==
In June 2024, Clarke's brother Conor invaded the pitch in a match between Collingwood and North Melbourne at Docklands Stadium. He previously had received a lifetime ban from Adelaide Oval for the same offence.
