= James Blanck =

Australian rules footballer (born 2000)

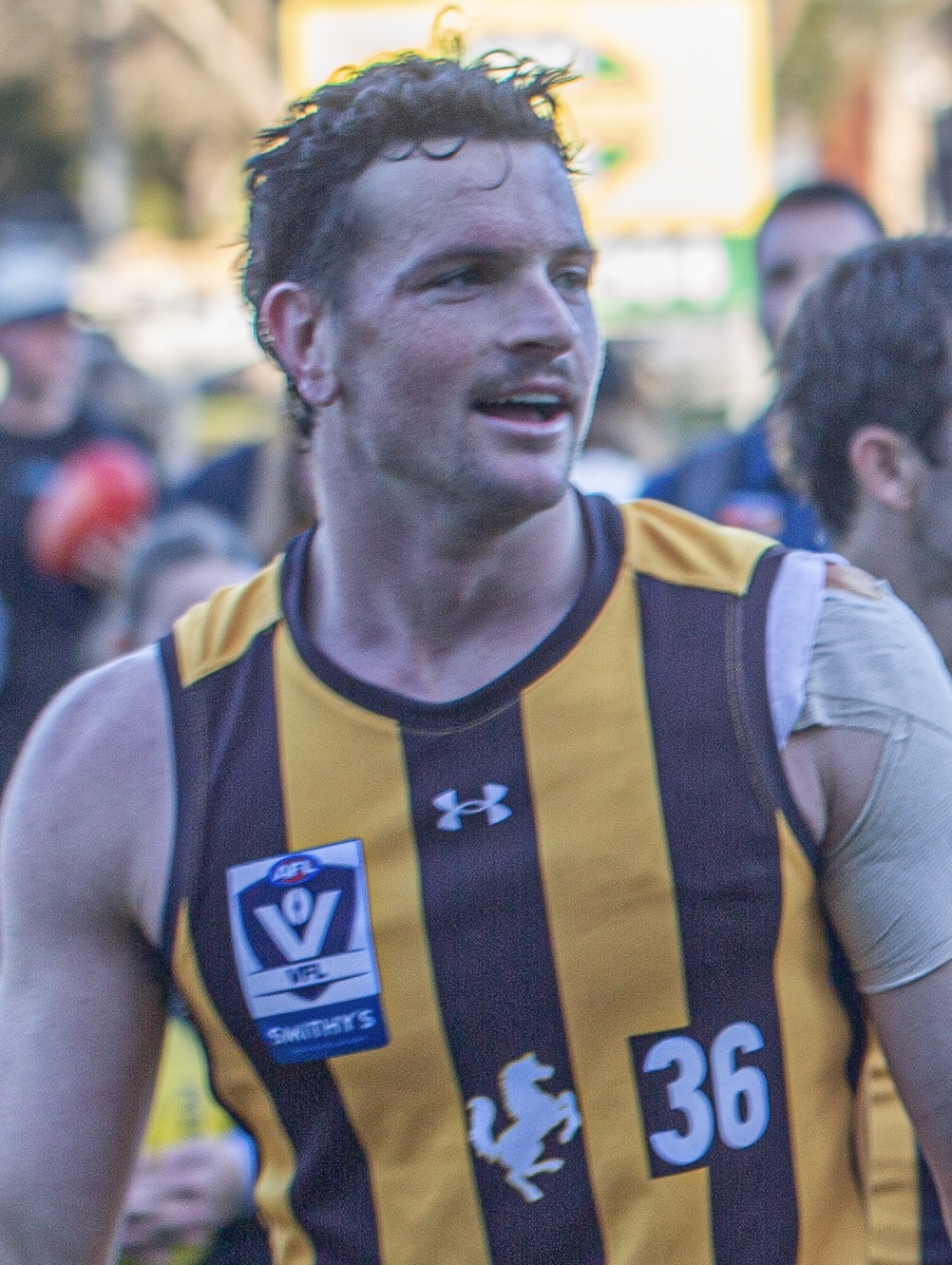
- Blanck in August 2026

Personal information
- Full name: James Blanck
- Born: 20 November 2000 (age 25)
- Original team: Box Hill Hawks (VFL)
- Draft: No. 20, 2022 mid-season rookie draft
- Debut: Round 15, 2022, Hawthorn vs. Western Bulldogs, at Marvel Stadium
- Height: 197 cm (6 ft 6 in)
- Weight: 93 kg (205 lb)
- Position: Defender

Playing career^{1}
Years	Club	Games (Goals)
2022–2026	Hawthorn	24 (0)
- ^{1} Playing statistics correct to the end of 2026.

Career highlights
- VFL premiership player: 2026

James Blanck (born 20 November 2000) is a professional Australian rules footballer who last played for the Hawthorn Football Club in the Australian Football League (AFL).

== Early career ==
Blanck had spent three seasons at Box Hill, the first year (2020) was wiped out because of Covid restrictions, in 2021 he was coached by now Hawthorn coach Sam Mitchell who helped him develop into a dour defender who uses his athleticism to team advantage. Hawthorn list management team kept a close eye on him, where he emerged as one of the best backmen in the VFL.

== AFL career ==
Blanck was the sixteenth player picked in the 2022 mid-season draft, having made an impression playing for Box Hill Hawks in the Victorian Football League. Blanck made his AFL debut in round 15 of the 2022 AFL season against Western Bulldogs at Marvel Stadium. The young defender was immediately tasked with the toughest jobs of shutting down some of the competition’s best forwards. He managed to play in the last nine games of the season.

Blanck kicked on in 2023, playing a career-high fifteen games. However, Blanck's 2024 season was derailed in an intraclub practice match on February 15, 2024, when he ruptured his ACL, leaving him ruled out for the entire season.

Blanck never featured at AFL level for Hawthorn again following his ACL injury. He was a part of the Box Hill team that won the VFL premiership in 2026 against Geelong, however, Hawthorn then delisted him four days later.

== Statistics ==
Updated to the end of 2026.

Legend
G	Goals	K	Kicks	D	Disposals	T	Tackles
B	Behinds	H	Handballs	M	Marks

Season	Team	No.	Games	Totals							Averages (per game)						
Season	Team	No.	Games	G	B	K	H	D	M	T	G	B	K	H	D	M	T
2022	Hawthorn	36	9	0	0	42	25	67	15	14	0.0	0.0	4.7	2.8	7.4	1.7	1.6
2023	Hawthorn	36	15	0	0	50	39	89	29	23	0.0	0.0	3.3	2.6	5.9	1.9	1.5
Career			24	0	0	92	64	156	44	37	0.0	0.0	3.8	2.7	6.5	1.8	1.5

== Honours and achievements ==
Team

- VFL premiership player (Box Hill): 2026
