= Will Edwards (Australian footballer) =

Australian rules footballer (born 2003)

Personal information
- Full name: William Edwards
- Born: 8 May 2003 (age 23)
- Original team: Manly Bombers/North Shore
- Draft: Category B rookie selection, 2022 AFL draft
- Height: 197 cm (6 ft 6 in)
- Position: Key defender

Club information
- Current club: Sydney Swans
- Number: 28

Playing career
Years	Club	Games (Goals)
2026–	Sydney Swans	14 (0)

William Edwards (born 8 May 2003) is an Australian rules footballer who plays for the Sydney Swans in the Australian Football League (AFL).

The son of British-born parents, Edwards began playing football with Melbourne club Beaumaris, but grew up in Sydney's northern suburbs, where he came through the juniors of the Manly Bombers. He attended the Shore School and afterwards had a part-time job as a funeral director.

Edwards, a key defender, is a product of the under-16s Swans Academy and was playing for the North Shore Bombers when he was signed as a Category B rookie in the 2022 AFL draft. Injuries plagued his early years with the Swans and he was restricted to 41 VFL appearances in his first four seasons. After 1241 days on the Swans list, Edwards made his AFL debut in round seven of the 2026 AFL season against the Western Bulldogs at Docklands. He remained a regular fixture in Sydney's defence over the next three months, excelling in one-on-one contests, and had the distinction of keeping Nick Larkey goal-less in a win over North Melbourne. In round 21 against St Kilda, Edwards had to be stretchered off with a broken ankle and took no part in the finals series.
