= Jed Adams (footballer) =

Australian rules footballer (born 2004)

Personal information
- Born: 14 May 2004 (age 22); Kalgoorlie, Western Australia, Australia
- Original team: South Mandurah
- Draft: No. 38, 2022 national draft
- Height: 196 cm (6 ft 5 in)
- Weight: 91 kg (201 lb)
- Position: Key defender

Club information
- Current club: Melbourne
- Number: 26

Playing career
Years	Club	Games (Goals)
2025–	Melbourne	1 (0)

Jed Adams (born 14 May 2004) is an Australian rules footballer who plays for Melbourne in the Australian Football League (AFL).

Born in Kalgoorlie, Adams moved with his family to Mandurah as a child and went on to attend Mandurah Catholic College. He played in the juniors for South Mandurah.

Adams is a left-footed key defender and in 2022 played in the Peel Thunder colts, while also making a solitary WAFL appearance towards the end of the season. He was a member of the Western Australian under-18s side which competed at the 2022 national championships.

After getting picked up by Melbourne at pick 38 of the 2022 national draft, Adams got a maiden AFL call up late in his third season with the Casey Scorpions in 2025, featuring against the Western Bulldogs at the MCG in round 22. The following year he signed a contract extension through to the end of 2027.
