= Danika Pisconeri =

Australian rules footballer (born 1991)

Personal information
- Born: 23 June 1991 (age 35)
- Original team: Subiaco (WAFLW)
- Draft: Expansion signing, 2019
- Debut: Round 1, 2020, West Coast vs. Collingwood, at Victoria Park
- Height: 181 cm (5 ft 11 in)
- Position: Ruck

Playing career^{1}
Years	Club	Games (Goals)
2020	West Coast	3 (0)
- ^{1} Playing statistics correct to the end of the 2020 season.

Career highlights
- 2× Dhara Kerr Award: 2019, 2020

Danika Pisconeri (born 23 June 1991) is an Australian rules footballer who played for the West Coast Eagles in the AFL Women's (AFLW).

== State football ==
A ruck, prior to joining West Coast, Piconeri was Subiaco's vice-captain in the WAFL Women's, where she jointly won the competition's best and fairest, the Dhara Kerr Award, with her captain Hayley Miller in 2019.

== AFLW career ==
Pisconeri was recruited by West Coast in August that year, from the club's female academy, for the team's inaugural AFLW season as an expansion club signing, and played in the team's inaugural side. In August 2020, Pisconeri was delisted by West Coast.
