= Harry Barnett =

Australian rules footballer (born 2004)

Personal information
- Nicknames: Barney, Batman
- Born: 22 January 2004 (age 22)
- Original teams: West Adelaide (SANFL); Goodwood Saints (AdFL)
- Draft: No. 23, 2022 national draft
- Debut: Round 16, 2023, West Coast vs. St Kilda, at Perth Stadium
- Height: 203 cm (6 ft 8 in)
- Weight: 98 kg (216 lb)
- Position: Ruck

Playing career^{1}
Years	Club	Games (Goals)
2023–2026	West Coast	2 (0)
- ^{1} Playing statistics correct to the end of 2026.

Harry Barnett (born 22 January 2004) is a former Australian rules footballer who played for the West Coast Eagles Football Club in the Australian Football League (AFL).

== Early life ==
Barnett, originally from Adelaide, South Australia, became a ruck in junior football due to his height which would eventually reach 203 cm. Hailing from the Goodwood Saints Football Club in the Adelaide Footy League, Barnett joined West Adelaide as a junior and featured prominently for their under-18 side. He eventually broke through to debut for West Adelaide's league side in the South Australian National Football League (SANFL) with 25 hit-outs on debut.

He featured as South Australia's ruck in the AFL National Championships. Barnett's performances in the National Championships earned him a selection in the All-Australian team.

Barnett was educated at Mercedes College in Springfield, South Australia.

== AFL career ==
The West Coast Eagles drafted Barnett with the 23rd overall pick in the 2022 national draft.

Barnett made his AFL debut in round 16 of the 2023 season, appearing in the loss to St Kilda at Perth Stadium. A late inclusion in the squad, he made his debut as the substitute in the match. His second appearance came in round two of 2024 in the loss to Greater Western Sydney. During the 2024 season, West Coast backed in the young ruck by extending his draftee contract until the end of 2026. He continued his growth as a versatile ruck in appearances for West Coast's reserves team in the Western Australian Football League (WAFL).

Following two seasons without an AFL appearance, Barnett was delisted by West Coast at the conclusion of the 2026 season, following the emergence of young ruck Cooper Duff-Tytler. He managed just two appearances across four seasons at the Eagles.

== Statistics ==
Updated to the end of the 2026 season.

Legend
G	Goals	K	Kicks	D	Disposals	T	Tackles
B	Behinds	H	Handballs	M	Marks	H/O	Hit-outs

Season	Team	No.	Games	Totals								Averages (per game)								Votes
Season	Team	No.	Games	G	B	K	H	D	M	T	H/O	G	B	K	H	D	M	T	H/O	Votes
2023	West Coast	30	1	0	0	0	2	2	0	1	1	0.0	0.0	0.0	2.0	2.0	0.0	1.0	1.0	0
2024	West Coast	30	1	0	0	3	3	6	0	2	8	0.0	0.0	3.0	3.0	6.0	0.0	2.0	8.0	0
2025	West Coast	30	0	–	–	–	–	–	–	–	–	–	–	–	–	–	–	–	–	–
2026	West Coast	30	0	–	–	–	–	–	–	–	–	–	–	–	–	–	–	–	–	–
Career			2	0	0	3	5	8	0	3	9	0.0	0.0	1.5	2.5	4.0	0.0	1.5	4.5	0
