= Nick Madden =

Australian rules footballer (born 2001)

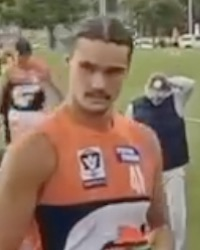
- Madden with Greater Western Sydney in the VFL in 2026

Personal information
- Born: 17 May 2004 (age 22)
- Original teams: Greater Western Sydney (VFL); Osborne (HFNL)
- Draft: 2022 Category B rookie selection
- Debut: Round 13, 2025, Greater Western Sydney vs. Port Adelaide, at Manuka Oval
- Height: 204 cm (6 ft 8 in)
- Position: Ruck

Club information
- Current club: Greater Western Sydney
- Number: 41

Playing career^{1}
Years	Club	Games (Goals)
2025–	Greater Western Sydney	10 (0)
- ^{1} Playing statistics correct to the end of round 22, 2026.

Nicholas Madden (born 17 May 2004) is a professional Australian rules footballer who plays for the Greater Western Sydney Giants in the Australian Football League (AFL).

== Early life and junior football ==
Madden hails from Osborne in the Riverina region of New South Wales. Playing for Osborne's local team, Madden joined the academy program of the AFL team Greater Western Sydney. He also represented the Allies at the AFL National Championships in 2022.

== AFL career ==
Developing strongly under GWS ruck coach Shane Mumford, Madden made his AFL debut in round 13 of the 2025 AFL season against Port Adelaide. He provides support in the ruck to Kieren Briggs in the loss. He impressed across his first few matches, but only managed three senior appearances for the season.

Following an impressive pre-season and strong form in the Victorian Football League (VFL) for the Giants' reserves team, Madden was recalled in round five against Richmond, while Briggs was dropped.

== Statistics ==
Updated to the end of round 22, 2026.

Legend
G	Goals	K	Kicks	D	Disposals	T	Tackles
B	Behinds	H	Handballs	M	Marks	H/O	Hit-outs

Season	Team	No.	Games	Totals								Averages (per game)								Votes
Season	Team	No.	Games	G	B	K	H	D	M	T	H/O	G	B	K	H	D	M	T	H/O	Votes
2023	Greater Western Sydney	41	0	—	—	—	—	—	—	—	—	—	—	—	—	—	—	—	—	0
2024	Greater Western Sydney	41	0	—	—	—	—	—	—	—	—	—	—	—	—	—	—	—	—	0
2025	Greater Western Sydney	41	3	0	0	7	26	33	3	9	79	0.0	0.0	2.3	8.7	11.0	1.0	3.0	26.3	0
2026	Greater Western Sydney	41	7	0	2	24	64	88	15	20	171	0.0	0.3	3.4	9.1	12.6	2.1	2.9	24.4	0
Career			10	0	2	31	90	121	18	29	250	0.0	0.2	3.1	9.0	12.1	1.8	2.9	25.0	0
