= Cameron Fleeton =

Australian rules footballer

Personal information
- Born: 17 June 2002 (age 24); Geelong
- Original teams: Geelong Falcons (Talent League); Geelong West Giants (GFNL)
- Draft: No. 58, 2020 national draft
- Debut: Round 9, 2023, Greater Western Sydney vs. Collingwood, at MCG
- Height: 192 cm (6 ft 4 in)
- Weight: 89 kg (196 lb)
- Position: Defender

Playing career^{1}
Years	Club	Games (Goals)
2021–2023	Greater Western Sydney	2 (0)
- ^{1} Playing statistics correct to the end of the 2023 season.

Cameron Fleeton (born 17 June 2002) is a former professional Australian rules footballer who played for the Greater Western Sydney Giants in the Australian Football League (AFL).

== Early life ==
Playing junior football, Fleeton represented his school, St Joseph's College, Geelong, in the Associated Catholic Colleges football competition. Fleeton, who originally played for Geelong West Giants in the Geelong Football Netball League, played nine games for the Geelong Falcons in the Talent League. He played as a medium defender, but grew an additional three centimetres in his draft year to become able to compete with tall forwards.

== AFL career ==
Fleeton was selected with the 58th and second-to-last pick in the 2020 national draft.

He spent two years playing in the Victorian Football League (VFL) with the Giants' reserves affiliate. In 2023, Fleeton was named to make his senior debut in the round nine match against eventual premiers Collingwood at the Melbourne Cricket Ground.

After just two games at senior level, Fleeton was delisted by the Giants at the conclusion of the 2023 season.

== Post-AFL career ==
Fleeton joined Woodville-West Torrens in the South Australian National Football League (SANFL) prior to the 2024 season.

== Statistics ==
Updated to the end of the 2023 season.

Legend
G	Goals	K	Kicks	D	Disposals	T	Tackles
B	Behinds	H	Handballs	M	Marks

Season	Team	No.	Games	Totals							Averages (per game)						
Season	Team	No.	Games	G	B	K	H	D	M	T	G	B	K	H	D	M	T
2021	Greater Western Sydney	29	0	–	–	–	–	–	–	–	–	–	–	–	–	–	–
2022	Greater Western Sydney	29	0	–	–	–	–	–	–	–	–	–	–	–	–	–	–
2023	Greater Western Sydney	29	2	0	0	8	9	17	3	5	0.0	0.0	4.0	4.5	8.5	1.5	2.5
Career			2	0	0	8	9	17	3	5	0.0	0.0	4.0	4.5	8.5	1.5	2.5
