= Toby Bedford =

Australian rules footballer

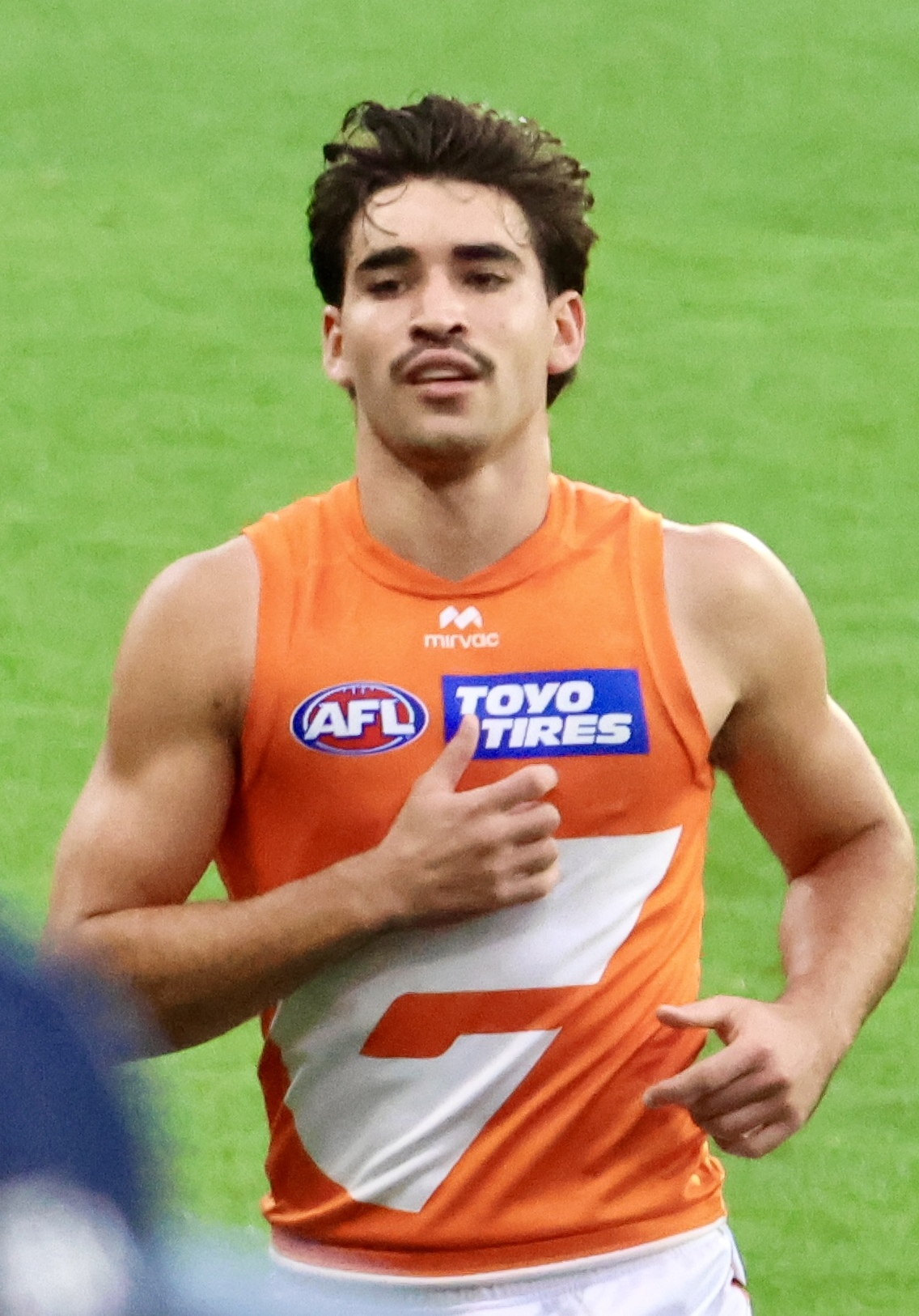
- Bedford in April 2025

Personal information
- Born: 27 May 2000 (age 26)
- Original team: Dandenong Stingrays (TAC Cup)/ Melbourne Grammar School (APS)
- Draft: No. 75, 2018 national draft
- Debut: Round 1, 2020, Melbourne vs. West Coast, at Optus Stadium
- Height: 178 cm (5 ft 10 in)
- Weight: 69 kg (152 lb)
- Position: Forward / midfielder

Club information
- Current club: Greater Western Sydney
- Number: 14

Playing career^{1}
Years	Club	Games (Goals)
2019–2022	Melbourne	18 (9)
2023–	Greater Western Sydney	82 (50)
Total		100 (59)
- ^{1} Playing statistics correct to the end of round 22, 2026.

Career highlights
- VFL premiership player: 2022

Toby Bedford (born 27 May 2000) is an Australian rules footballer playing for the Greater Western Sydney Giants in the Australian Football League (AFL), having initially been drafted to Melbourne in the 2018 AFL draft. A small forward, he made his AFL debut in the opening round of the 2020 season.

== Junior career ==
During his junior career, Bedford played for the Dandenong Stingrays in the TAC Cup and was part of Melbourne's Next Generation Academy, which allowed Melbourne to match any other club's bid on Bedford during a draft. He also represented Vic Country at the 2018 AFL Under 18 Championships. He also played for his school side Melbourne Grammar School in the APS competition. Bedford's strong performance in a TAC Cup preliminary final victory over the Sandringham Dragons, in which he amassed three goals, six tackles and 13 disposals, was highlighted by Fox Sports and ESPN. His speed and tackling were noted as strengths; ESPN likened his play to West Coast defender Lewis Jetta. Bedford was expected to attract a second-round bid in the 2018 AFL draft.

== AFL career ==
Bedford was drafted by Melbourne as an academy selection with pick 75 in the 2018 draft. He spent his first year at the club playing for Casey, Melbourne's Victorian Football League (VFL) affiliate; he played 21 matches in 2019. He made his AFL debut in the opening round of the 2020 season.

Bedford was traded to Greater Western Sydney at the conclusion of the 2022 AFL season.

== Personal life ==
Bedford has Bunuba Indigenous Australian ancestry and is a cousin of Melbourne footballer Krstel Petrevski, who plays in the AFL Women's.

== Statistics ==
Updated to the end of round 22, 2026.

Legend
G	Goals	K	Kicks	D	Disposals	T	Tackles
B	Behinds	H	Handballs	M	Marks

Season	Team	No.	Games	Totals							Averages (per game)							Votes
Season	Team	No.	Games	G	B	K	H	D	M	T	G	B	K	H	D	M	T	Votes
2019	Melbourne	12	0	—	—	—	—	—	—	—	—	—	—	—	—	—	—	0
2020 (Note: The 2020 season was played with 17 home-and-away matches per team (down from 22) and 16-minute quarters with time on (down from 20-minute quarters with time on) due to the impact of the COVID-19 pandemic.)	Melbourne	12	2	0	1	6	10	16	3	4	0.0	0.5	3.0	5.0	8.0	1.5	2.0	0
2021	Melbourne	12	0	—	—	—	—	—	—	—	—	—	—	—	—	—	—	0
2022 (Note: 2022 statistics include two games in which Bedford was a used medical substitute (rounds 1 and 10) and eight games in which he was an unused medical substitute (rounds 2, 3, 4, 5, 6, 8, 12 and 19).)	Melbourne	12	16	9	3	33	32	65	13	21	0.6	0.2	2.1	2.0	4.1	0.8	1.3	0
2023	Greater Western Sydney	14	19	12	16	105	145	250	44	97	0.6	0.8	5.5	7.6	13.2	2.3	5.1	0
2024	Greater Western Sydney	14	23	10	7	103	165	268	41	141	0.4	0.3	4.5	7.2	11.7	1.8	6.1	2
2025	Greater Western Sydney	14	23	17	6	125	128	253	48	117	0.7	0.3	5.4	5.6	11.0	2.1	5.1	0
2026	Greater Western Sydney	14	17	11	8	94	145	239	33	83	0.6	0.5	5.5	8.5	14.1	1.9	4.9	0
Career			100	59	41	466	625	1091	182	463	0.6	0.4	4.7	6.3	10.9	1.8	4.6	2
