= Harry Rowston =

Australian rules footballer

Personal information
- Full name: Harry Rowston
- Born: 12 August 2004 (age 22)
- Original team: Calder Cannons/Griffith Football Club
- Draft: No. 16, 2022 AFL draft
- Debut: Round 2, 2023, Greater Western Sydney vs. West Coast, at Optus Stadium
- Height: 182 cm (6 ft 0 in)
- Weight: 82 kg (181 lb)
- Position: Midfield

Club information
- Current club: Greater Western Sydney
- Number: 24

Playing career^{1}
Years	Club	Games (Goals)
2023–	Greater Western Sydney	27 (11)
- ^{1} Playing statistics correct to the end of round 22, 2026.

Career highlights
- AFL Rising Star nominee: 2025

Harry Rowston (born 12 August 2004) is a professional Australian rules footballer playing for the Greater Western Sydney Giants in the Australian Football League (AFL).

== Early career ==
Rowston grew up on a farm near Binya approximately 45 km from Griffith, New South Wales. His father Phillip, was in 1993 drafted by Sydney but he never played in a senior game.

Harry began his footy in the juniors for Barellan before going into Griffith where there was better standard from a major country league, Riverina Football League.

At 15 he became a boarder at Assumption College Kilmore where played in the school’s 1st XVIII. In Years 10 and 11 he played in the school holidays for Echuca Under 18s in the Goulburn Valley League. Later for Queanbeyan in AFL Canberra where he was linked to the GWS Academy.

== AFL career ==
Rowston was a member of the Giants Academy and the club was able to match Sydney's bid for the midfielder with pick 16 in the 2022 NAB AFL Draft. He made his debut for the Giants in Perth against the West Coast. Rowston accepted a two-year extension contract shortly after his debut.

In round 23 of the 2025 AFL season Rowston kicked four goals to earn himself a nomination for the 2025 AFL Rising Star.

== Statistics ==
Updated to the end of round 22, 2026.

Legend
G	Goals	K	Kicks	D	Disposals	T	Tackles
B	Behinds	H	Handballs	M	Marks

Season	Team	No.	Games	Totals							Averages (per game)							Votes
Season	Team	No.	Games	G	B	K	H	D	M	T	G	B	K	H	D	M	T	Votes
2023	Greater Western Sydney	24	7	1	2	28	21	49	11	10	0.1	0.3	4.0	3.0	7.0	1.6	1.4	0
2024	Greater Western Sydney	24	0	—	—	—	—	—	—	—	—	—	—	—	—	—	—	0
2025	Greater Western Sydney	24	10	5	2	82	32	114	30	27	0.5	0.2	8.2	3.2	11.4	3.0	2.7	0
2026	Greater Western Sydney	24	10	5	1	97	61	158	36	25	0.5	0.1	9.7	6.1	15.8	3.6	2.5	0
Career			27	11	5	207	114	321	77	62	0.4	0.2	7.7	4.2	11.9	2.9	2.3	0
