= WAFL Women's =

Australian rules football league

- Most recent season or competition: 2026 WAFL Women's season
- Sport: Australian rules football
- Founded: 2018
- First season: 2019
- Owners: WAFC, WAWFL (until 2021)
- No. of teams: 9
- Country: Australia
- Most recent champion: East Fremantle (3rd premiership)
- Most titles: Claremont & East Fremantle (3 premierships)
- Broadcaster: Seven Network (Grand Final only)
- Sponsor: Optus
- Website: wafl.com.au

WAFL Women's (WAFLW) is an Australian rules football league based in Perth, Western Australia. The WAFLW is the premier women's football competition in Western Australia and is contested by nine teams, all of whom are owned and operated by clubs in the men's West Australian Football League (WAFL).

The league was established in 2018 by the West Australian Football Commission (WAFC) and West Australian Women's Football League (WAWFL), the latter having been the governing body and league for women's football in the state from 1987 to 2018. The competition has been singularly overseen by the WAFC after the WAWFL was dissolved in 2021.

The league runs from March to August, usually running partially concurrently with the AFL Women's (AFLW). It is the second primary women's football competition for West Australian footballers underneath the semi-professional national competition, and one of the three elite leagues in women's Australian rules football (the AFLW, SANFLW and WAFLW).

== Clubs ==
Five of the ten WAFL clubs fielded teams in the inaugural 2019 WAFLW season: Claremont, East Fremantle, Peel Thunder, Subiaco and Swan Districts.

South Fremantle joined the league the following year, with West Perth joining the league in 2022. East Perth joined the league in 2023. Perth became the final WAFL club to enter the league in 2025.

Neither of the state's two AFL teams (Fremantle and West Coast) field teams in the league: Fremantle was an AFLW foundation club in 2017, while West Coast entered the AFLW in 2019 after playing scratch matches in 2017–2018.

Club	Nickname	Home venue	Est.	First WAFLW season	WAFLW seasons	WAFLW premierships	Most recent
Claremont	Tigers	Claremont Oval	1906	2019	8	3	2025
East Fremantle	Sharks	East Fremantle Oval	1898	2019	8	3	2026
East Perth	Royals	Leederville Oval	1902	2023	4	—	—
Peel	Thunder	Rushton Park	1996	2019	8	2	2021
Perth	Demons	Lathlain Park	1899	2025	2	—	—
South Fremantle	Bulldogs	Fremantle Oval	1900	2020	7	—	—
Subiaco	Lions	Leederville Oval	1896	2019	8	—	—
Swan Districts	Swans	Bassendean Oval	1932	2019	8	—	—
West Perth	Falcons	Arena Joondalup	1891	2022	5	—	—

== Honours ==
=== Premiers ===
- 2019: East Fremantle
- 2020: Peel Thunder
- 2021: Peel Thunder
- 2022: Claremont
- 2023: East Fremantle
- 2024: Claremont
- 2025: Claremont
- 2026: East Fremantle

=== Dhara Kerr Award ===
- 2019: Hayley Miller & Danika Pisconeri
- 2020: Danika Pisconeri
- 2021: Ella Smith
- 2022: Sharon Wong
- 2023: Jayme Harken
- 2024: Jayme Harken
- 2025: Krstel Petrevski

== Rogers Cup and reserves-grade competition ==
The Rogers Cup is the state's leading under-18 development competition for female footballers and is aligned to the WAFL Women's. The competition was inaugurated in 2013 by the now-defunct WAWFL before being taken over by the WAFL in 2021. Peel Thunder are the most successful side in the competition, having won five premierships, followed by West Perth with four titles.

Furthermore, when the WAFL Women's was founded in 2019, a reserve-grade competition, known as the WAFLW Reserves was instituted by the WAWFL and WAFL, though the competition was suspended by the WAFL at the end of the 2022 season, with the commission saying it was open to reintroducing the competition in the future.
