= Josh Fahey =

Australian rules footballer

Personal information
- Full name: Josh Fahey
- Born: 11 November 2003 (age 22)
- Original team: Queanbeyan (AFL Canberra)
- Draft: No. 42, 2021 national draft: Greater Western Sydney
- Debut: Round 11, 2023, Greater Western Sydney vs. Geelong, at Kardinia Park
- Height: 187 cm (6 ft 2 in)
- Weight: 82 kg (181 lb)
- Position: Defender

Playing career
| Years | Club | Games (Goals) |
| 2022–2025 | Greater Western Sydney | 7 (4) |

Josh Fahey (born 11 November 2003) is a former professional Australian rules footballer who played for the Greater Western Sydney Giants in the Australian Football League (AFL).

== AFL career ==
Fahey was recruited by Greater Western Sydney with the 42nd overall selection in the 2021 national draft.

Fahey debuted for GWS in round 11 of the 2023 AFL season in a seven-point win against Geelong.

At the end of the 2024 season, after an investigation by the AFL due to alleged inappropriate behaviour at an end of season function. Fahey was suspended for four matches after being found to have breached AFL rules regarding conduct unbecoming. Six teammates were also suspended for two matches, while another seven were fined $5000. Fahey never played another match for the Giants and was delisted at the end of the 2025 AFL season.

== Statistics ==
Statistics sourced from AFL Tables

Legend
| G | Goals | K | Kicks | D | Disposals | T | Tackles |
| B | Behinds | H | Handballs | M | Marks |

| Season | Team | No. | Games | Totals | | | | | | | Averages (per game) | | | | | | |
| Season | Team | No. | Games | G | B | K | H | D | M | T | G | B | K | H | D | M | T |
|---|---|---|---|---|---|---|---|---|---|---|---|---|---|---|---|---|---|
| 2022 | Greater Western Sydney | 34 | 0 | – | – | – | – | – | – | – | – | – | – | – | – | – | – |
| 2023 | Greater Western Sydney | 34 | 7 | 4 | 2 | 38 | 14 | 52 | 15 | 6 | 0.6 | 0.3 | 5.4 | 2.0 | 7.4 | 2.1 | 0.9 |
| 2024 | Greater Western Sydney | 34 | 0 | – | – | – | – | – | – | – | – | – | – | – | – | – | – |
| 2025 | Greater Western Sydney | 34 | 0 | – | – | – | – | – | – | – | – | – | – | – | – | – | – |
| Career | | | 7 | 4 | 2 | 38 | 14 | 52 | 15 | 6 | 0.6 | 0.3 | 5.4 | 2.0 | 7.4 | 2.1 | 0.9 |
