= Krstel Petrevski =

Female Australian rules footballer

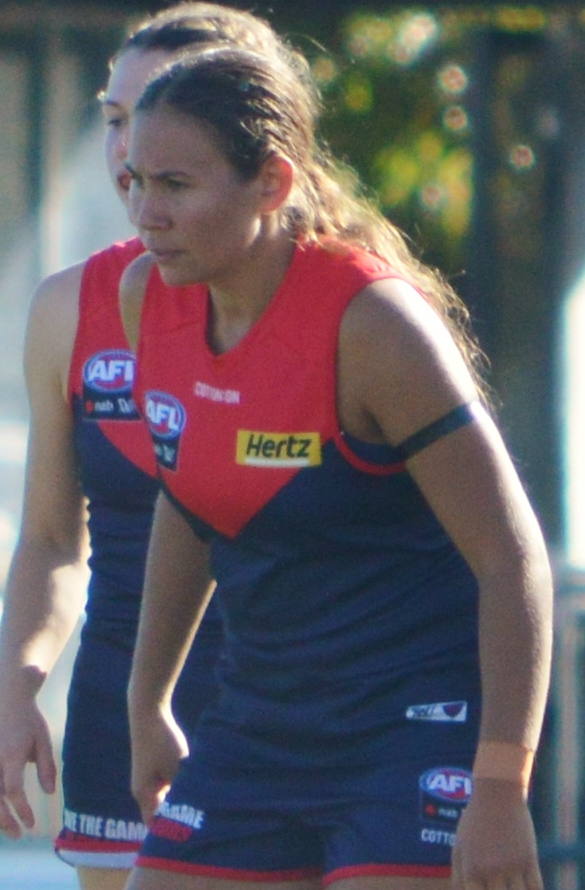
- Petrevski with Melbourne in February 2021

Personal information
- Full name: Krstel Petrevski
- Born: 8 April 2001 (age 25); Halls Creek, Western Australia
- Original team: Calder Cannons (NAB League)
- Draft: No. 78, 2019 national draft
- Debut: Semi-final, 2020, Melbourne vs. Greater Western Sydney, at Giants Stadium
- Height: 162 cm (5 ft 4 in)
- Position: Midfielder

Playing career^{1}
Years	Club	Games (Goals)
2020–2022 (S6)	Melbourne	4 (2)
2022 (S7)–2023	West Coast	6 (0)
Total		10 (2)
- ^{1} Playing statistics correct to the end of the 2023 season.

Krstel Petrevski (born 8 April 2001) is an Australian rules footballer who played for West Coast in the AFL Women's (AFLW).

In 2020, Petrevski made her debut for Melbourne in the 2020 AFLW season semi final against GWS Giants. Petrevski started the 2021 AFLW season kicking two goals in Round 1 against Gold Coast Suns, before a severe hamstring injury ended her season after two games.

In 2021, Petrevski designed the Melbourne AFLW Indigenous guernsey worn against Collingwood in Round 5 of the 2021 AFLW season. Petrevski was also commissioned to design the Melbourne Storm Indigenous jersey worn in Round 12 against Brisbane Broncos in the 2021 NRL season.

In June 2022, Petrevski was traded alongside Isabella Simmons to West Coast, where she joined her cousin Sam Petrevski-Seton who plays for the AFL side.

In December 2023, Petrevski was delisted. She returned to state-level football for Subiaco following her delisting, and won the Dhara Kerr Award as the WAFL Women's fairest and best player throughout the 2025 season.
