= 2026 Hawthorn Football Club season =

128th season of the Australian Football League (AFL)

Hawthorn Football Club
2026 season
- President: Andy Gowers
- Coach: Sam Mitchell
- Captains: Jai Newcombe; James Sicily
- Home grounds: Melbourne Cricket Ground; University of Tasmania Stadium
- Home and away: 4th
- Finals series: Preliminary final
- Best and Fairest: Nick Watson
- Leading goalkicker: Jack Gunston (66)
- Highest home attendance: 97,835 (Preliminary final vs. Brisbane Lions)
- Lowest home attendance: 8,263 (Round 7 vs. Gold Coast)
- Average home attendance: 43,452

The 2026 Hawthorn Football Club season is the club's 102nd season in the Australian Football League and 125th overall.

== Kits ==
Manufacturer: ISC, Under Armour
Sponsors: Tasmania, Nissan, KFC, Superhero,

Home	Away

== Playing list changes ==
=== Additions ===
Date	Player	Type	From	Ref
19 November 2025	Cameron Nairn	Draft	Central District	
19 November 2025	Aidan Schubert	Draft	Central District	
20 November 2025	Jack Dalton	Draft	Sandringham Dragons	
20 November 2025	Matt LeRay	Draft	Central District	
21 November 2025	Ollie Greeves	Draft	Eastern Ranges	
2 March 2026	Flynn Perez	Preseason Supplemental Selection	Sturt Football Club	
26 May 2026	Max Beattie	Mid-season draft	Woodville-West Torrens	

=== Departures ===
Date	Player	Type	To	Ref
14 August 2025	Luke Breust	Retired	—	
24 September 2025	Sam Frost	Delisted	—	
24 September 2025	Jasper Scaife	Delisted	—	
3 October 2025	James Worpel	Free agent	Geelong	
15 October 2025	Changkuoth Jiath	Trade	Melbourne	
15 October 2025	Jai Serong	Trade	Sydney	
21 October 2025	Seamus Mitchell	Delisted	—	

=== Contract extensions ===
Date	Player	Contract length	Contract ends	Ref
1 October 2025	Sam Butler	Two years	2027	
10 October 2025	Connor Macdonald	Three years	2029	
22 October 2025	Bodie Ryan	One year	2026	
22 October 2025	Jaime Uhr-Henry	One year	2026	
27 November 2025	Ned Reeves	Three years	2029	
18 February 2026	Josh Weddle	Four years	2030	
21 May 2026	Cameron Mackenzie	Two years	2028	
4 June 2026	Jarman Impey	Three years	2029	
22 June 2026	Aidan Schubert	Two years	2029	
14 July 2026	Harry Morrison	One year	2027	
22 July 2026	Jack Gunston	One year	2027	
23 July 2026	Mitch Lewis	Four years	2030	
5 August 2026	Matt Hill	Two years	2028	
1 September 2026	Max Beattie	One year	2027	
14 September 2026	Ollie Greeves	One year	2027	

== 2026 player squad ==
2026 Hawthorn Football Club squad
Senior list		Rookie list	Coaching staff
1 Harry Morrison; 2 Mitchell Lewis; 3 Jai Newcombe (C); 4 Jarman Impey; 5 Nick Watson; 6 James Sicily (C); 7 Ned Reeves; 8 Dylan Moore; 9 Connor Macdonald; 10 Karl Amon; 11 Conor Nash; 12 Will Day; 13 Calsher Dear; 14 Jack Scrimshaw; 15 Blake Hardwick; 16 Massimo D'Ambrosio; 17 Lloyd Meek; 18 Mabior Chol; 19 Jack Gunston	20 Finn Maginness; 21 Noah Mraz; 22 Cameron Nairn; 23 Josh Weddle; 24 Josh Battle; 25 Josh Ward; 26 Bodie Ryan; 27 Will McCabe; 28 Cameron Mackenzie; 29 Aidan Schubert; 31 Matthew LeRay; 30 Sam Butler; 32 Cody Anderson; 33 Jack Ginnivan; 34 Jack Dalton; 36 James Blanck; 37 Tom Barrass; 42 Bailey Macdonald; 44 Henry Hustwaite	35 Ollie Greeves; 38 Max Ramsden; 39 Flynn Perez; 40 Max Beattie; 41 Matt Hill (B); 43 Jaime Uhr-Henry (B)	Head coach: Sam Mitchell; Assistant coaches: Brett Ratten (head of coaching performance & development); Kade Simpson (backs); David Mackay (midfield); Adrian Hickmott (forwards); David Hale (structure and opposition); Daniel Giansiracusa (head of development); Jason Johannisen (development coach); David Mirra (development coach/VFL coach); Jason Williams (development coach); Legend: (c) Captain(s); (vc) Vice-captain(s); Injured; Upgraded rookie(s); (ret) Retired; (B) Category B rookie; (FA) Free agent; Updated: 10 March 2026; Source(s): HFC Website; Coaches

== Season ==
=== Pre–season ===
Date and local time	Opponent	Scores (Hawthorn's scores indicated in bold)			Venue	Attendance	Ref.
Date and local time	Opponent	Home	Away	Result	Venue	Attendance	Ref.
Monday, 16 February (1:45 pm)	Geelong	**16.15 (111)**	14.10 (94)	Won by 17 points	Kennedy Community Centre	—	Recap
Friday, 27 February (7:10 pm)	Western Bulldogs	18.9 (117)	**11.7 (73)**	Lost by 44 points	Mission Whitten Oval	—	Recap

=== Home and Away ===
Rd	Date and local time	Opponent	**Scores** (Hawthorn's scores indicated in **bold**)			Venue	Attendance	Record	Position	Report
Rd	Date and local time	Opponent	Home	Away	Result	Venue	Attendance	Record	Position	Report
OR	Saturday, 7 March (4:15 pm)	Greater Western Sydney	19.8 (122)	**14.11 (95)**	Lost by 27 points	ENGIE Stadium	16,157	0–1	8th	Report
1	Friday, 13 March (7:40 pm)	Essendon	13.5 (83)	**21.19 (145)**	Won by 62 points	Melbourne Cricket Ground	71,384	1–1	6th	Report
2	Thursday, 19 March (7:30 pm)	Sydney	**14.15 (99)**	13.4 (82)	Won by 17 points	Melbourne Cricket Ground	47,945	2–1	4th	Report
3	Bye									
4	Monday, 6 April (3:15 pm)	Geelong	**13.14 (92)**	14.7 (91)	Won by 1 point	Melbourne Cricket Ground	84,712	3–1	6th	Report
5	Saturday, 11 April (7:05 pm)	Western Bulldogs	**15.14 (104)**	8.16 (64)	Won by 40 points	Adelaide Oval	48,451	4–1	3rd	Report
6	Saturday, 18 April (4:15 pm)	Port Adelaide	**13.11 (89)**	13.8 (86)	Won by 3 points	Marvel Stadium	37,070	5–1	3rd	Report
7	Saturday, 25 April (12:30 pm)	Gold Coast	**16.16 (112)**	9.9 (63)	Won by 49 points	University of Tasmania Stadium	8,263	6–1	3rd	Report
8	Thursday, 30 April (7:30 pm)	Collingwood	15.3 (93)	**13.15 (93)**	Draw	Melbourne Cricket Ground	76,632	6–1–1	3rd	Report
9	Thursday, 7 May (6:10 pm)	Fremantle	12.16 (88)	**11.7 (73)**	Lost by 15 points	Optus Stadium	54,140	6–1–2	3rd	Report
10	Saturday, 16 May (4:15 pm)	Melbourne	18.12 (120)	**12.9 (81)**	Lost by 39 points	Melbourne Cricket Ground	68,557	6–1–3	6th	Report
11	Thursday, 21 May (7:30 pm)	Adelaide	**10.15 (75)**	9.12 (66)	Won by 9 points	University of Tasmania Stadium	8,312	7–1–3	4th	Report
12	Thursday, 28 May (7:30 pm)	St Kilda	9.13 (67)	**18.11 (119)**	Won by 52 points	Marvel Stadium	33,476	8–1–3	3rd	Report
13	Friday, 5 June (7:40 pm)	Western Bulldogs	**9.17 (71)**	12.5 (77)	Lost by 6 points	Melbourne Cricket Ground	59,556	8–1–4	3rd	Report
14	Bye									
15	Friday, 19 June (7:40 pm)	Gold Coast	14.13 (97)	**17.11 (113)**	Won by 16 points	People First Stadium	19,576	9–1–4	3rd	Report
16	Friday, 26 June (7:40 pm)	Greater Western Sydney	**14.12 (96)**	12.10 (82)	Won by 14 points	Melbourne Cricket Ground	35,238	10–1–4	3rd	Report
17	Saturday, 4 July (1:15 pm)	Melbourne	**14.6 (90)**	19.11 (125)	Lost by 35 points	University of Tasmania Stadium	9,377	10–1–5	3rd	Report
18	Saturday, 11 July (7:35 pm)	Carlton	6.3 (39)	**15.13 (103)**	Won by 64 points	Melbourne Cricket Ground	70,314	11–1–5	3rd	Report
19	Sunday, 19 July (1:10 pm))	Richmond	6.16 (52)	**18.14 (122)**	Won by 70 points	Melbourne Cricket Ground	49,127	12–1–5	3rd	Report
20	Saturday, 25 July (4:15 pm)	Essendon	**19.18 (132)**	5.9 (39)	Won by 93 points	Melbourne Cricket Ground	42,509	13–1–5	3rd	Report
21	Saturday, 1 August (1:35 pm)	North Melbourne	**14.15 (99)**	12.11 (83)	Won by 16 points	University of Tasmania Stadium	9,420	14–1–5	3rd	Report
22	Friday, 7 August (7:40 pm)	Brisbane Lions	18.17 (125)	**8.10 (58)**	Lost by 67 points	The Gabba	33,003	14–1–6	3rd	Report
23	Saturday, 15 August (7:40pm)	Collingwood	**13.14 (92)**	13.14 (92)	Draw	Melbourne Cricket Ground	76,186	14–2–6	4th	Report
24	Sunday, 23 August (5:20pm)	West Coast	6.9 (45)	**16.11 (107)**	Won by 62 points	Optus Stadium	43,066	15–2–6	4th	Report

==== Ladder ====
Pos	Team	Pld	W	L	D	PF	PA	PP	Pts	Qualification
1	Fremantle	23	19	4	0	2286	1666	137.2	76	Finals series
2	Sydney	23	18	5	0	2543	1869	136.1	72	Finals series
3	Brisbane Lions (P)	23	16	7	0	2499	2054	121.7	64	Finals series
**4**	Hawthorn	**23**	**15**	**6**	**2**	**2260**	**1881**	**120.1**	64	Finals series
5	Geelong	23	15	8	0	2355	1925	122.3	60	Finals series
6	Adelaide	23	15	8	0	2169	1849	117.3	60	Finals series
7	Melbourne	23	15	8	0	2301	2099	109.6	60	Finals series
8	Western Bulldogs	23	13	9	1	1901	1992	95.4	54	Finals series
9	Collingwood	23	12	9	2	2021	1974	102.4	52	Finals series
10	Carlton	23	12	10	1	2007	1978	101.5	50	Finals series
11	St Kilda	23	10	13	0	2030	1974	102.8	40	
12	Greater Western Sydney	23	10	13	0	2073	2095	98.9	40	
13	Gold Coast	23	9	14	0	2011	2128	94.5	36	
14	North Melbourne	23	9	14	0	1932	2175	88.8	36	
15	Port Adelaide	23	7	16	0	1804	2048	88.1	28	
16	West Coast	23	4	19	0	1615	2333	69.2	16	
17	Richmond	23	3	20	0	1483	2373	62.5	12	
18	Essendon	23	2	21	0	1601	2478	64.6	8	

Source: afl.com.au
Rules for classification: 1) points; 2) percentage; 3) number of points for
(P) Premiers

=== Finals Series ===
Rd	Date and local time	Opponent	Scores (Hawthorn's scores indicated in bold)			Venue	Attendance	Report
Rd	Date and local time	Opponent	Home	Away	Result	Venue	Attendance	Report
Wildcard final	First-week bye							
Qualifying final	Thursday, 3 September (6:10 pm)	Fremantle	5.10 (40)	**10.12 (72)**	Won by 32 points	Optus Stadium	59,446	Report
Semi–final	Advanced to Preliminary final							
Preliminary final	Saturday, 19 September (5:15 pm)	Brisbane Lions	**19.8 (122)**	20.11 (131)	Lost by 9 points	Melbourne Cricket Ground	97,835	Report

== Statistics ==
Players without appereances not included.

No.	Name	Pos.	Games	Goals	Behinds	Kicks	Handballs	Disposals	Marks	Tackles	Hitouts
1	Harry Morrison	MF	15	5	1	151	113	264	75	41	0
2	Mitch Lewis	FW	24	39	24	196	98	294	129	36	2
3	Jai Newcombe	MF	25	8	10	298	340	638	79	102	1
4	Jarman Impey	DF	23	5	4	344	173	517	152	36	0
5	Nick Watson	FW	23	63	26	194	120	314	53	50	0
6	James Sicily	DF	24	2	3	335	172	507	171	38	0
7	Ned Reeves	RU	15	5	4	63	49	112	12	35	362
8	Dylan Moore	FW	24	24	16	226	214	440	106	67	0
9	Connor Macdonald	FW	25	16	14	296	222	518	112	81	0
10	Karl Amon	DF	20	0	5	290	121	411	104	41	0
11	Conor Nash	MF	10	2	2	80	111	191	21	53	0
12	Will Day	MF	13	9	5	149	119	268	47	52	0
13	Calsher Dear	FW	5	4	5	27	18	45	18	13	0
14	Jack Scrimshaw	DF	6	0	0	52	52	104	28	9	0
15	Blake Hardwick	DF	25	9	4	307	129	436	144	58	0
16	Massimo D'Ambrosio	MF	25	5	12	320	183	503	119	70	0
17	Lloyd Meek	RU	25	4	3	124	169	293	53	84	652
18	Mabior Chol	FW	20	31	21	142	47	189	81	45	32
19	Jack Gunston	FW	19	66	37	170	29	199	109	18	0
20	Finn Maginness	FW	6	2	1	28	54	82	11	12	0
21	Noah Mraz	DF	4	1	2	43	17	60	21	12	7
22	Cam Nairn	MF	4	0	0	30	22	52	17	2	0
23	Josh Weddle	DF	22	7	15	188	148	336	106	56	8
24	Josh Battle	DF	23	2	3	298	157	455	145	34	0
25	Josh Ward	MF	25	6	4	267	295	562	102	96	0
26	Bodie Ryan	DF	5	0	0	39	12	51	19	6	0
27	Will McCabe	FW	4	2	2	23	12	35	14	4	0
28	Cameron Mackenzie	MF	23	4	8	236	225	461	51	94	0
29	Aidan Schubert	FW	1	0	2	6	3	9	5	1	4
30	Sam Butler	MF	8	4	4	66	31	97	27	28	0
33	Jack Ginnivan	FW	24	20	18	283	167	450	127	56	0
34	Jack Dalton	MF	5	3	3	25	31	56	16	19	0
35	Ollie Greeves	MF	4	1	1	22	27	49	19	6	0
37	Tom Barrass	DF	21	1	0	116	69	185	84	23	0
38	Max Ramsden	FW	2	1	1	6	13	19	6	1	0
39	Flynn Perez	DF	7	0	0	36	43	79	14	25	0
40	Max Beattie	FW	4	3	3	21	9	30	7	7	0
41	Matt Hill	FW	2	2	1	5	8	13	0	2	0
42	Bailey Macdonald	DF	14	0	1	75	95	170	34	43	0
44	Henry Hustwaite	MF	1	0	0	7	12	19	1	3	0

== Goalkickers ==
Name	Goals	Games	Average
Jack Gunston	66	19	3.5
Nick Watson	63	23	2.7
Mitchell Lewis	39	24	1.6
Mabior Chol	31	20	1.6
Dylan Moore	24	24	1.0
Jack Ginnivan	20	24	0.8
Connor Macdonald	16	25	0.6
Will Day	9	13	0.7
Blake Hardwick	9	25	0.4
Jai Newcombe	8	25	0.3
Josh Weddle	7	22	0.3
Josh Ward	6	25	0.2
Massimo D'Ambrosio	5	25	0.2
Jarman Impey	5	23	0.2
Harry Morrison	5	15	0.3
Ned Reeves	5	15	0.3
Sam Butler	4	8	0.5
Calsher Dear	4	5	0.8
Cameron Mackenzie	4	23	0.2
Lloyd Meek	4	25	0.2
Max Beattie	3	4	0.8
Jack Dalton	3	5	0.6
Josh Battle	2	23	0.1
Matt Hill	2	2	1.0
Finn Maginness	2	6	0.3
Will McCabe	2	4	0.5
Conor Nash	2	10	0.2
James Sicily	2	24	0.1
Tom Barrass	1	21	0.0
Ollie Greeves	1	4	0.3
Noah Mraz	1	4	0.3
Max Ramsden	1	2	0.5

== Disciplinary record ==
Round	Name	Reason	Result	Opponent	Ref
PS	Jai Newcombe	Rough conduct	Fine	Western Bulldogs	
5	Conor Nash	Careless contact with an umpire	Fine	Western Bulldogs	
6	Dylan Moore	Striking	1 game	Port Adelaide	
6	James Sicily	Striking	1 game	Port Adelaide	
10	Blake Hardwick	Melee	Fine	Fremantle	
15	Jack Ginnivan	Striking	Fine	Gold Coast	
15	Josh Weddle	Rough conduct	3 games	Gold Coast	
16	Blake Hardwick	Striking	Fine	Greater Western Sydney	
17	Jai Newcombe	Striking	Fine	Melbourne	
20	Cameron Mackenzie	Careless contact with an umpire	Fine	Essendon	
24	Jai Newcombe	Careless contact with an umpire	Fine	West Coast	
PF	Tom Barrass	Other misconduct	Fine	Brisbane Lions	
PF	James Sicily	Other misconduct	Fine	Brisbane Lions	

== Awards ==
Award	Name	Ref
All-Australian team	Jarman Impey	
All-Australian team	Nick Watson	
22 Under 22 team	Nick Watson	
22 Under 22 team	Josh Weddle	
Mark of the Year	Nick Watson	
Peter Crimmins Medal	Nick Watson	
Best player in finals	Nick Watson	
Lethal award	Nick Watson	
Best clubman	Conor Nash	
Most improved	Connor Macdonald	
Most courageous	Lloyd Meek	
Most promising	Noah Mraz	
Community leadership award	Flynn Perez	

== Milestones ==
Round	Milestone	Name	Score	Opponent	Ground	Ref
OR	150th AFL game	Josh Battle	19.8 (122) – 14.11 (95)	Greater Western Sydney	ENGIE Stadium	
1	200th AFL game	Blake Hardwick	13.5 (83) – 21.19 (145)	Essendon	Melbourne Cricket Ground	
1	50th club game	Jack Ginnivan	13.5 (83) – 21.19 (145)	Essendon	Melbourne Cricket Ground	
2	50th club game	Mabior Chol	14.15 (99) – 13.4 (82)	Sydney	Melbourne Cricket Ground	
4	150th club game	Jarman Impey	13.14 (92) – 14.7 (91)	Geelong	Melbourne Cricket Ground	
4	AFL debut	Jack Dalton	13.14 (92) – 14.7 (91)	Geelong	Melbourne Cricket Ground	
4	Club debut	Flynn Perez	13.14 (92) – 14.7 (91)	Geelong	Melbourne Cricket Ground	
6	200th AFL game	Karl Amon	13.11 (89) – 13.8 (86)	Port Adelaide	Marvel Stadium	
6	50th AFL game	Cameron Mackenzie	13.11 (89) – 13.8 (86)	Port Adelaide	Marvel Stadium	
6	AFL debut	Will McCabe	13.11 (89) – 13.8 (86)	Port Adelaide	Marvel Stadium	
6	1st AFL goal	Will McCabe	13.11 (89) – 13.8 (86)	Port Adelaide	Marvel Stadium	
7	50th AFL game	Nick Watson	16.16 (112) – 9.9 (63)	Gold Coast	University of Tasmania Stadium	
7	1st club goal	Tom Barrass	16.16 (112) – 9.9 (63)	Gold Coast	University of Tasmania Stadium	
8	50th AFL game	Ned Reeves	15.3 (93) – 13.15 (93)	Collingwood	Melbourne Cricket Ground	
9	AFL debut	Bodie Ryan	12.16 (88) – 11.7 (73)	Fremantle	Optus Stadium	
10	100th AFL game	Jack Ginnivan	18.12 (120) – 12.9 (81)	Melbourne	Melbourne Cricket Ground	
10	100th AFL game	Connor Macdonald	18.12 (120) – 12.9 (81)	Melbourne	Melbourne Cricket Ground	
11	150th AFL goal	Mitch Lewis	10.15 (75) – 9.12 (66)	Adelaide	University of Tasmania Stadium	
11	AFL debut	Cam Nairn	10.15 (75) – 9.12 (66)	Adelaide	University of Tasmania Stadium	
16	100th AFL goal	Nick Watson	14.12 (96) – 12.10 (82)	Greater Western Sydney	Melbourne Cricket Ground	
16	1st AFL goal	Jack Dalton	14.12 (96) – 12.10 (82)	Greater Western Sydney	Melbourne Cricket Ground	
17	100th club goal	Mabior Chol	14.6 (90) – 19.11 (125)	Melbourne	University of Tasmania Stadium	
17	AFL debut	Matt Hill	14.6 (90) – 19.11 (125)	Melbourne	University of Tasmania Stadium	
17	AFL debut	Noah Mraz	14.6 (90) – 19.11 (125)	Melbourne	University of Tasmania Stadium	
18	550th club goal	Jack Gunston	6.3 (39) – 15.13 (103)	Carlton	Melbourne Cricket Ground	
18	150th AFL goal	Dylan Moore	6.3 (39) – 15.13 (103)	Carlton	Melbourne Cricket Ground	
18	AFL debut	Ollie Greeves	6.3 (39) – 15.13 (103)	Carlton	Melbourne Cricket Ground	
18	1st AFL goal	Matt Hill	6.3 (39) – 15.13 (103)	Carlton	Melbourne Cricket Ground	
19	1st AFL goal	Ollie Greeves	6.16 (52) – 18.14 (122)	Richmond	Melbourne Cricket Ground	
19	1st AFL goal	Noah Mraz	6.16 (52) – 18.14 (122)	Richmond	Melbourne Cricket Ground	
19	1st club goal	Josh Battle	6.16 (52) – 18.14 (122)	Richmond	Melbourne Cricket Ground	
20	600th AFL goal	Jack Gunston	19.18 (122) – 5.9 (39)	Essendon	Melbourne Cricket Ground	
21	AFL debut	Aidan Schubert	14.15 (99) – 12.11 (83)	North Melbourne	University of Tasmania Stadium	
23	200th AFL game	James Sicily	13.14 (92) – 13.14 (92)	Collingwood	Melbourne Cricket Ground	
23	50th AFL goal	Jai Newcombe	13.14 (92) – 13.14 (92)	Collingwood	Melbourne Cricket Ground	
23	AFL debut	Max Beattie	13.14 (92) – 13.14 (92)	Collingwood	Melbourne Cricket Ground	
23	1st AFL goal	Max Beattie	13.14 (92) – 13.14 (92)	Collingwood	Melbourne Cricket Ground	
24	300th AFL game	Jack Gunston	6.9 (45) – 16.11 (107)	West Coast	Optus Stadium	
24	100th AFL game	Mitch Lewis	6.9 (45) – 16.11 (107)	West Coast	Optus Stadium	
24	100th AFL game	Lloyd Meek	6.9 (45) – 16.11 (107)	West Coast	Optus Stadium	
PF	150th AFL game	Dylan Moore	19.8 (122) – 20.11 (131)	Brisbane Lions	Melbourne Cricket Ground	
