= 2027 Hawthorn Football Club season =

129th season of the Australian Football League (AFL)

Hawthorn Football Club
2027 season
- President: Andrew Gowers
- Coach: Sam Mitchell
- Captains: Jai Newcombe; James Sicily
- Home grounds: Melbourne Cricket Ground; University of Tasmania Stadium

The 2027 Hawthorn Football Club season will be the club's 103rd season in the Australian Football League and 126th overall.

== Kits ==
Manufacturer: Under Armour
Sponsors: Nissan, KFC, Superhero,

Home	Away

== Playing list changes ==
=== Additions ===
Date	Player	Type	From	Ref
5 October 2026	Ollie Purcell	Category B rookie	—	
5 October 2026	Zach Merrett	Trade	Essendon	
9 October 2026	Ben King	Trade	Gold Coast	
14 October 2026	Josh Goater	Trade	North Melbourne	
20 November 2026	Benji Van Rooyen	Draft	Claremont	
20 November 2026	Cooper Hodge	Draft	Brisbane Lions	
20 November 2026	Keenan Boi	Draft	Gippsland Power	

=== Departures ===
Date	Player	Type	To	Ref
24 September 2026	Cody Anderson	Delisted	—	
24 September 2026	James Blanck	Delisted	—	
24 September 2026	Henry Hustwaite	Delisted	—	
24 September 2026	Bodie Ryan	Delisted	Melbourne	
24 September 2026	Jaime Uhr-Henry	Delisted	–	
6 October 2026	Finn Maginness	Trade	Western Bulldogs	
12 October 2026	Sam Butler	Trade	Gold Coast	
12 October 2026	Aidan Schubert	Trade	Gold Coast	
16 October 2026	Max Ramsden	Delisted	St Kilda	
16 October 2026	Flynn Perez	Delisted	—	

=== Contract extensions ===
Date	Player	Contract length	Contract ends	Ref
25 September 2026	Bailey Macdonald	Three Years	2029	
2 October 2026	Calsher Dear	Two Years	2028	
2 October 2026	Will McCabe	One Year	2027	

== 2027 player squad ==
2027 Hawthorn Football Club squad
Senior list		Rookie list	Coaching staff
1 Harry Morrison; 2 Mitch Lewis; 3 Jai Newcombe (C); 4 Jarman Impey; 5 Nick Watson; 6 James Sicily (C); 7 Ned Reeves; 8 Dylan Moore; 9 Connor Macdonald; 10 Karl Amon; 11 Conor Nash; 12 Will Day; 13 Calsher Dear; 14 Jack Scrimshaw; 15 Blake Hardwick; 16 Massimo D'Ambrosio; 17 Lloyd Meek	18 Mabior Chol; 19 Jack Gunston; 21 Noah Mraz; 22 Cam Nairn; 23 Josh Weddle; 24 Josh Battle; 25 Josh Ward; 27 Will McCabe; 28 Cameron Mackenzie; 31 Matthew LeRay; 33 Jack Ginnivan; 34 Jack Dalton; 37 Tom Barrass; 42 Bailey Macdonald; Josh Goater; Ben King; Benji Van Rooyen; Cooper Hodge; Keenan Boi	35 Ollie Greeves; 40 Max Beattie; 41 Matt Hill (B); Ollie Purcell (B)	Head coach: Sam Mitchell; Assistant coaches: Kade Simpson (backs); David Mackay (midfield); Adrian Hickmott (forwards); David Hale (structure and opposition); Daniel Giansiracusa (head of development); Jason Johannisen (development coach); David Mirra (development coach/VFL coach); Jason Williams (development coach); Tate Kaesler (development coach); Legend: (c) Captain(s); (vc) Vice-captain(s); Injured; Upgraded rookie(s); (ret) Retired; (B) Category B rookie; (FA) Free agent; Updated: 14 October 2026; Source(s): HFC Website; Coaches

== Season ==
=== Pre–season ===
Date and local time	Opponent	Scores (Hawthorn's scores indicated in bold)			Venue	Attendance	Ref.
Date and local time	Opponent	Home	Away	Result	Venue	Attendance	Ref.
Wednesday, 3 March (3:40 pm)	Greater Western Sydney				Henson Park	—	

=== Home and Away ===
Rd	Date and local time	Opponent	**Scores** (Hawthorn's scores indicated in **bold**)			Venue	Attendance	Record	Position	Report
Rd	Date and local time	Opponent	Home	Away	Result	Venue	Attendance	Record	Position	Report
1	Friday, 19 March (7:50 pm)	Brisbane Lions				MCG				
2	Monday 29 March (3:15 pm)	Geelong				MCG				
3	Saturday 3 April (7:45 pm)	Essendon				MCG				
4	Saturday 10 April (7:15 pm)	Fremantle				Adelaide Oval				
5	Saturday 17 April (7:35 pm)	Western Bulldogs				Marvel Stadium				
6	Thursday 22 April (7:30 pm)	Gold Coast				People First Stadium				
7	Friday 30 April (7:40 pm)	Carlton				MCG				
8	Sunday 9 May (12:30 pm)	Greater Western Sydney				UTAS Stadium				
9	Saturday 15 May (7:35 pm)	Port Adelaide				Marvel Stadium				
10	Friday 21 May (7:40 pm)	Sydney				SCG				
11	Saturday 29 May (1:15 pm)	St Kilda				UTAS Stadium				
12	Friday 4 June (7:40 pm)	Collingwood				MCG				
13	Thursday 10 June (7:00 pm)	Adelaide				Adelaide Oval				
14	Thursday 17 June (7:30 pm)	Fremantle				MCG				
15	Bye									
16	Saturday 3 July (1:05 pm)	Port Adelaide				Adelaide Oval				
17		Geelong				MCG				
18		Gold Coast				UTAS Stadium				
19		North Melbourne				Marvel Stadium				
20		Melbourne				MCG				
21		Sydney				UTAS Stadium				
22		Richmond				MCG				
23		West Coast				Optus Stadium				
24		Western Bulldogs				MCG				
