= 2025 Hawthorn Football Club season =

124th season of the Hawthorn Football Club

Hawthorn Football Club
2025 season
- President: Andrew Gowers
- Coach: Sam Mitchell
- Captain: James Sicily
- Home grounds: Melbourne Cricket Ground; University of Tasmania Stadium
- Home and away: 8th
- Finals series: Preliminary final
- Best and Fairest: Jack Gunston
- Leading goalkicker: Jack Gunston (73)
- Highest home attendance: 80,735 (Round 1 vs. Essendon)
- Lowest home attendance: 12,722 (Round 19 vs. Port Adelaide)
- Average home attendance: 41,479

The 2025 Hawthorn Football Club season was the club's 101st season in the Australian Football League and 124th overall.

== Kits ==
Manufacturer: ISC
Sponsors: Tasmania, Nissan, KFC, Skechers, Superhero

Home	Away	Heritage

== Key personnel ==
Position	Name
Board members
President	Andrew Gowers
Director	Anne-Marie Pellizzer
Director	Ian Silk
Director	James Merlino
Director	Katie Hudson
Director	Luke Stambolis
Director	Owen Wilson
Director	Tim Shearer
Director	Luke McCabe
Coaches
Senior coach	Sam Mitchell
Backline coach	Kade Simpson
Midfield coach	David Hale
Contest coach	Adrian Hickmott
Head of coaching performance & development	Brett Ratten
Head of development	Andrew Collins
Development coach	Zane Littlejohn
Leadership group
Captain	James Sicily
Vice–captain	Dylan Moore
Leadership group member	Sam Frost
Leadership group member	Jarman Impey
Leadership group member	Mitchell Lewis
Leadership group member	Will Day

== Playing list changes ==
=== Additions ===
Date	Player	Reason	Old club	Ref
4 October 2024	Josh Battle	Unrestricted Free agent	St Kilda	
16 October 2024	Tom Barrass	Trade	West Coast	
30 October 2024	Matt Hill	Category B rookie	Melbourne Storm	
30 October 2024	Jaime Uhr-Henry	Category B rookie	Dandenong Rangers (NBL1) (NRL)	
21 November 2024	Noah Mraz	Draft	Dandenong Stingrays	
21 November 2024	Cody Anderson (NGA)	Draft	Eastern Ranges	

=== Departures ===
Date	Player	Reason	New club	Ref
2 September 2024	Chad Wingard	Retired	—	
18 September 2024	Cooper Stephens	Delisted	—	
18 September 2024	Clay Tucker	Delisted	—	
18 October 2024	Denver Grainger-Barras	Delisted	—	
18 October 2024	Jack O'Sullivan	Delisted	—	
18 October 2024	Ethan Phillips	Delisted	—	
28 October 2024	Josh Bennetts	Delisted	—	

== 2025 player squad ==
2025 Hawthorn Football Club squad
Senior list		Rookie list	Coaching staff
1 Harry Morrison; 2 Mitchell Lewis; 3 Jai Newcombe; 4 Jarman Impey; 5 James Worpel; 6 James Sicily (C); 7 Ned Reeves; 8 Sam Frost; 9 Changkuoth Jiath; 10 Karl Amon; 11 Conor Nash; 12 Will Day; 13 Dylan Moore (VC); 14 Jack Scrimshaw; 15 Blake Hardwick; 16 Massimo D'Ambrosio; 17 Lloyd Meek; 18 Mabior Chol; 19 Jack Gunston	20 Finn Maginness; 21 Noah Mraz; 22 Luke Breust; 23 Josh Weddle; 24 Josh Battle; 25 Josh Ward; 26 Bodie Ryan; 27 Will McCabe; 28 Cameron Mackenzie; 29 Jai Serong; 30 Sam Butler; 31 Connor Macdonald; 32 Cody Anderson; 33 Jack Ginnivan; 34 Nick Watson; 35 Calsher Dear; 37 Tom Barrass; 42 Bailey Macdonald; 44 Henry Hustwaite	36 James Blanck; 38 Max Ramsden; 40 Seamus Mitchell; 39 Jasper Scaife; 41 Matt Hill (B); 43 Jaime Uhr-Henry (B)	Head coach: Sam Mitchell; Assistant coaches: Brett Ratten (head of coaching performance & development); Kade Simpson (backs); David Hale (midfield); Adrian Hickmott (forwards); Andy Collins (head of development); David Mackay (development coach); Arryn Siposs (development coach); Zane Littlejohn (development coach/Box Hill coach); Legend: (c) Captain(s); (vc) Vice-captain(s); Injured; Upgraded rookie(s); (ret) Retired; (B) Category B rookie; (FA) Free agent; Updated: 9 December 2024; Source(s): HFC Website; Coaches

== Season ==
=== Pre–season ===
Date and local time	Opponent	Scores (Hawthorn's scores indicated in bold)			Venue	Attendance	Report
Date and local time	Opponent	Home	Away	Result	Venue	Attendance	Report
Monday, 17 February (2:00 pm)	Geelong	15.16 (106)	**13.8 (86)**	Lost by 20 points	GMHBA Stadium	—	Report
Thursday, 27 February (5:20 pm)	Western Bulldogs	**9.12 (66)**	11.11 (77)	Lost by 11 points	University of Tasmania Stadium	—	Report

=== Home and Away ===
Rd	Date and local time	Opponent	**Scores** (Hawthorn's scores indicated in **bold**)			Venue	Attendance	Position	Report
Rd	Date and local time	Opponent	Home	Away	Result	Venue	Attendance	Position	Report
OR	Friday, 7 March (7:40 pm)	Sydney	11.10 (76)	**14.12 (96)**	Won by 20 points	Sydney Cricket Ground	40,310	2nd	Report
1	Friday, 14 March (7:40 pm)	Essendon	**17.9 (111)**	12.13 (85)	Won by 26 points	Melbourne Cricket Ground	80,735	2nd	Report
2	Thursday, 20 March (7:30 pm)	Carlton	8.12 (60)	**12.8 (80)**	Won by 20 points	Melbourne Cricket Ground	62,735	1st	Report
3	Saturday, 29 March (7:35 pm)	Greater Western Sydney	**10.16 (76)**	9.10 (64)	Won by 12 points	University of Tasmania Stadium	14,021	1st	Report
4	Bye								
5	Sunday, 13 April (6:50 pm)	Port Adelaide	18.13 (121)	**14.7 (91)**	Lost by 30 points	Adelaide Oval	47,671	5th	Report
6	Monday, 21 April (3:20 pm)	Geelong	12.14 (86)	**11.13 (79)**	Lost by 7 points	Melbourne Cricket Ground	88,746	7th	Report
7	Sunday, 27 April (4:40 pm)	West Coast	**18.16 (124)**	11.8 (74)	Won by 50 points	Marvel Stadium	26,425	4th	Report
8	Sunday, 4 May (3:20 pm)	Richmond	**16.13 (109)**	6.8 (44)	Won by 65 points	Melbourne Cricket Ground	62,321	3rd	Report
9	Saturday, 10 May (1:20 pm)	Melbourne	7.14 (56)	**13.13 (91)**	Won by 35 points	Melbourne Cricket Ground	50,351	3rd	Report
10	Thursday, 15 May (7:00 pm)	Gold Coast	16.8 (104)	**15.6 (96)**	Lost by 8 points	TIO Stadium	12,314	4th	Report
11	Saturday, 24 May (4:15 pm)	Brisbane Lions	**8.12 (60)**	14.9 (93)	Lost by 33 points	Melbourne Cricket Ground	57,919	6th	Report
12	Friday, 30 May (7:40 pm)	Collingwood	16.11 (107)	**8.8 (56)**	Lost by 51 points	Melbourne Cricket Ground	83,706	6th	Report
13	Thursday, 5 June (7:30 pm)	Western Bulldogs	8.11 (59)	**12.9 (81)**	Won by 22 points	Marvel Stadium	35,725	6th	Report
14	Friday, 13 June (7:40 pm)	Adelaide	**6.11 (47)**	5.14 (44)	Won by 3 points	University of Tasmania Stadium	15,129	5th	Report
15	Bye								
16	Saturday, 28 June (4:15 pm)	North Melbourne	**23.12 (150)**	9.11 (65)	Won by 85 points	University of Tasmania Stadium	13,287	5th	Report
17	Saturday, 5 July (7:40pm)	St Kilda	10.14 (74)	**14.10 (94)**	Won by 20 points	Marvel Stadium	36,035	5th	Report
18	Saturday, 12 July (6:10 pm)	Fremantle	12.5 (77)	**9.10 (64)**	Lost by 13 points	Optus Stadium	49,460	6th	Report
19	Saturday, 19 July (1:20 pm)	Port Adelaide	**13.9 (87)**	7.7 (49)	Won by 38 points	University of Tasmania Stadium	12,722	5th	Report
20	Thursday, 24 July (7:30 pm)	Carlton	**13.7 (85)**	9.7 (61)	Won by 24 points	Melbourne Cricket Ground	51,271	5th	Report
21	Friday, 1 August (7:10 pm)	Adelaide	15.11 (101)	**13.9 (87)**	Lost by 14 points	Adelaide Oval	50,654	7th	Report
22	Thursday, 7 August (7:30 pm)	Collingwood	**17.8 (110)**	6.10 (46)	Won by 64 points	Melbourne Cricket Ground	68,515	7th	Report
23	Saturday, 16 August (4:15 pm)	Melbourne	**13.14 (92)**	8.8 (56)	Won by 36 points	Melbourne Cricket Ground	53,871	5th	Report
24	Sunday, 24 August (7:20 pm)	Brisbane Lions	11.23 (89)	**11.13 (79)**	Lost by 10 points	The Gabba	32,086	8th	Report

==== Ladder ====
Pos	Team	Pld	W	L	D	PF	PA	PP	Pts	Qualification
1	Adelaide	23	18	5	0	2278	1635	139.3	72	Finals series
2	Geelong	23	17	6	0	2425	1714	141.5	68	Finals series
3	Brisbane Lions (P)	23	16	6	1	2061	1804	114.2	66	Finals series
4	Collingwood	23	16	7	0	1991	1627	122.4	64	Finals series
5	Greater Western Sydney	23	16	7	0	2114	1834	115.3	64	Finals series
6	Fremantle	23	16	7	0	1978	1815	109.0	64	Finals series
7	Gold Coast	23	15	8	0	2173	1740	124.9	60	Finals series
**8**	Hawthorn	**23**	**15**	**8**	**0**	**2045**	**1691**	**120.9**	60	Finals series
9	Western Bulldogs	23	14	9	0	2493	1820	137.0	56	
10	Sydney	23	12	11	0	1845	1902	97.0	48	
11	Carlton	23	9	14	0	1799	1861	96.7	36	
12	St Kilda	23	9	14	0	1839	2077	88.5	36	
13	Port Adelaide	23	9	14	0	1705	2136	79.8	36	
14	Melbourne	23	7	16	0	1902	2038	93.3	28	
15	Essendon	23	6	17	0	1535	2209	69.5	24	
16	North Melbourne	23	5	17	1	1805	2365	76.3	22	
17	Richmond	23	5	18	0	1449	2197	66.0	20	
18	West Coast	23	1	22	0	1466	2438	60.1	4	

Source: afl.com.au
Rules for classification: 1) points; 2) percentage; 3) number of points for
(P) Premiers

=== Finals ===
Rd	Date and local time	Opponent	Scores (Hawthorn's scores indicated in bold)			Venue	Attendance	Report
Rd	Date and local time	Opponent	Home	Away	Result	Venue	Attendance	Report
Elimination final	Saturday, 6 September (3:15 pm)	Greater Western Sydney	13.10 (88)	**16.11 (107)**	Won by 19 points	ENGIE Stadium	20,634	Report
Semi–final	Friday, 12 September (7:10 pm)	Adelaide	10.7 (67)	**14.17 (101)**	Won by 34 points	Adelaide Oval	52,005	Report
Preliminary Final	Friday, 19 September (7:40 pm)	Geelong	17.13 (115)	**13.7 (85)**	Lost by 30 points	Melbourne Cricket Ground	99,567	Report

== Statistics ==
As of the end of season. Players without appearances not included

No.	Name	Pos.	Games	Goals	Behinds	Kicks	Handballs	Disposals	Marks	Tackles	Hitouts
1	Harry Morrison	MF	20	5	2	189	159	348	91	61	0
2	Mitchell Lewis	FW	8	8	3	42	21	63	26	16	6
3	Jai Newcombe	MF	26	11	9	265	331	596	91	127	0
4	Jarman Impey	DF	24	5	8	306	157	463	119	62	0
5	James Worpel	MF	21	4	8	211	210	421	34	104	0
6	James Sicily	DF	23	6	3	305	144	449	153	36	0
7	Ned Reeves	RU	1	0	0	4	2	6	0	3	34
8	Sam Frost	DF	2	0	0	6	2	8	0	2	0
9	Changkuoth Jiath	DF	20	0	3	153	123	276	54	32	0
10	Karl Amon	DF	25	4	3	426	174	600	116	53	0
11	Conor Nash	MF	22	5	2	194	210	404	45	124	17
12	Will Day	MF	6	6	4	63	63	126	18	31	0
13	Dylan Moore	FW	26	23	17	274	231	505	111	96	0
14	Jack Scrimshaw	DF	16	0	0	126	93	219	72	38	0
15	Blake Hardwick	FW	26	11	8	260	123	383	118	61	0
16	Massimo D'Ambrosio	MF	26	5	10	308	164	472	106	48	0
17	Lloyd Meek	RU	25	10	7	131	207	338	68	104	948
18	Mabior Chol	FW	24	42	18	171	69	240	94	64	68
19	Jack Gunston	FW	23	73	37	218	71	289	119	31	0
20	Finn Maginness	FW	13	4	6	79	94	173	36	23	0
22	Luke Breust	FW	8	4	3	32	22	54	15	11	0
23	Josh Weddle	DF	18	9	9	163	127	290	89	36	40
24	Josh Battle	DF	26	0	2	296	184	480	136	49	8
25	Josh Ward	MF	24	3	4	261	253	514	79	89	0
28	Cameron Mackenzie	MF	12	0	1	100	98	198	24	50	0
30	Sam Butler	MF	6	3	2	39	32	71	13	31	0
31	Connor Macdonald	FW	24	22	18	217	140	357	96	72	0
33	Jack Ginnivan	FW	25	29	10	261	205	466	89	52	0
34	Nick Watson	FW	25	36	18	145	127	272	51	51	0
35	Calsher Dear	FW	8	9	8	36	25	61	21	15	5
37	Tom Barrass	DF	24	0	0	142	100	242	94	28	0
38	Max Ramsden	RU	4	4	3	24	12	36	15	7	12
40	Seamus Mitchell	DF	4	0	0	14	11	25	8	9	0
42	Bailey Macdonald	DF	6	1	0	16	16	32	6	4	0
44	Henry Hustwaite	MF	4	0	1	23	32	55	8	14	0

== Goalkickers ==
Name	Goals	Games	Average
Jack Gunston	73	23	3.2
Mabior Chol	42	24	1.8
Nick Watson	36	25	1.4
Jack Ginnivan	29	25	1.2
Dylan Moore	23	26	0.9
Connor Macdonald	22	24	0.9
Blake Hardwick	11	26	0.4
Jai Newcombe	11	26	0.4
Calsher Dear	10	9	1.1
Lloyd Meek	10	25	0.4
Josh Weddle	9	18	0.5
Mitchell Lewis	8	8	1.0
Will Day	6	6	1.0
James Sicily	6	23	0.3
Massimo D'Ambrosio	5	26	0.2
Jarman Impey	5	24	0.2
Harry Morrison	5	20	0.3
Conor Nash	5	22	0.2
Karl Amon	4	25	0.2
Luke Breust	4	8	0.5
Finn Maginness	4	13	0.3
Max Ramsden	4	4	1.0
James Worpel	4	21	0.2
Sam Butler	3	6	0.5
Josh Ward	3	25	0.1
Bailey Macdonald	1	6	0.2

== Injury list ==
Name	Injury	Status	Source	Injury date	Return date
James Blanck	Knee			15 February 2024	12 April 2025
Sam Butler	Leg			28 April 2024	12 April 2025
Mitchell Lewis	Knee			6 July 2024	28 June 2025
Will Day	SC joint			18 August 2024	17 February 2025
Cameron Mackenzie	Hamstring			6 September 2024	17 February 2025
Sam Frost	Foot			6 September 2024	17 February 2025
Calsher Dear	Back			20 December 2024	27 April 2025
Changkuoth Jiath	Hip			26 February 2025	8 March 2025
James Worpel	Ankle			7 March 2025	13 April 2025
Jack Scrimshaw	Concussion			14 March 2024	8 April 2025
Connor Macdonald	Ankle			20 March 2025	21 April 2025
Will Day	Foot			8 April 2025	24 July 2025
Conor Nash	Wrist			13 April 2025	21 April 2025
Jasper Scaife	Hand			20 April 2025	27 April 2025
Karl Amon	Concussion			27 April 2025	10 May 2025
Jack Scrimshaw	Concussion			27 April 2025	15 May 2025
Cameron Mackenzie	Hand			2 May 2025	15 May 2025
Max Ramsden	Calf			3 May 2025	10 May 2025
Luke Breust	Back			10 May 2025	7 June 2025
Ned Reeves	Glute			15 May 2025	31 May 2025
Matt Hill	Ankle			17 May 2025	7 June 2025
Noah Mraz	Concussion			17 May 2025	31 May 2025
James Sicily	Hip/Abdominal			30 May 2025	5 July 2025
Jack Scrimshaw	Ankle			30 May 2025	14 June 2025
Bodie Ryan	Clavicle			31 May 2025	20 July 2025
James Worpel	Quad			5 June 2025	5 July 2025
Jack Scrimshaw	Hamstring			14 June 2025	6 July 2025
Josh Weddle	Back			28 June 2025	30 August 2025
Sam Butler	Leg			28 June 2025	20 July 2025
Noah Mraz	Knee			4 July 2025	16 September 2025
Seamus Mitchell	Ankle			10 July 2025	20 July 2025
Finn Maginness	Kidney			19 July 2025	
Mabior Chol	Groin			19 July 2025	1 August 2025
Seamus Mitchell	Groin			20 July 2025	17 August 2025
Cody Anderson	Leg			20 July 2025	17 August 2025
Will Day	Foot			1 August 2025	
Sam Frost	Ankle			5 August 2025	17 August 2025
Harry Morrison	Quad			5 August 2025	
Cody Anderson	Quad			30 August 2025	6 September 2025
Calsher Dear	Hamstring			6 September 2025	
Luke Breust	Knee			13 September 2025	

== Disciplinary record ==
Round	Name	Opponent	Reason	Result	Ref
OR	Jai Newcombe	Sydney	Tripping	Fine	
1	Sam Frost	Essendon	Striking	Fine	
1	Jack Scrimshaw	Essendon	Striking	3 games	
5	Blake Hardwick	Port Adelaide	Melee	Fine	
5	Changkuoth Jiath	Port Adelaide	Melee	Fine	
6	Conor Nash	Geelong	Striking	4 games	
7	Jack Ginnivan	West Coast	Kicking	Fine	
8	Jack Ginnivan	Richmond	Melee	Fine	
8	Blake Hardwick	Richmond	Melee	Fine	
8	Blake Hardwick	Richmond	Melee	Fine	
8	Jarman Impey	Richmond	Melee	Fine	
8	Changkuoth Jiath	Richmond	Melee	Fine	
8	James Sicily	Richmond	Melee	Fine	
8	Nick Watson	Richmond	Melee	Fine	
8	Nick Watson	Richmond	Obscene gesture	Fine	
8	Josh Weddle	Richmond	Melee	Fine	
10	James Worpel	Gold Coast	Rough conduct	Fine	
11	Jai Newcombe	Brisbane Lions	Rough conduct	Fine	
12	Mabior Chol	Collingwood	Obscene gesture	Fine	
13	Conor Nash	Western Bulldogs	Contact with an Umpire	Fine	
16	Tom Barrass	North Melbourne	Rough conduct	Fine	
16	Dylan Moore	North Melbourne	Contact with an Umpire	Fine	
16	Jai Newcombe	North Melbourne	Melee	Fine	
16	Nick Watson	North Melbourne	Melee	Fine	
20	James Sicily	Carlton	Rough conduct	Fine	
21	Jai Newcombe	Adelaide	Contact with an Umpire	Fine	
21	Jack Ginnivan	Adelaide	Obscene gesture	Fine	
23	Jai Newcombe	Melbourne	Contact with an Umpire	Fine	
PF	Jack Ginnivan	Geelong	Tripping	Fine	

== Awards ==
Name	Award	Ref
Jack Gunston	All-Australian team (2nd selection)	
Josh Battle	All-Australian team (1st selection)	
Josh Weddle	22under 22 team (2nd selection)	
Nick Watson	22under 22 team (1st selection)	
Jack Gunston	Peter Crimmins Medal (2nd award)	
Jack Gunston	Lethal award (1st award)	
Josh Battle	Most courageous (1st award)	
Will Day	Best clubman (1st award)	
Luke Breust	Commuinity leadership award (1st award)	
Calsher Dear	Most promising (1st award)	
Jai Newcombe	Best player in finals (2nd award)	

== Milestones ==
Round	Name	Milestone	Opponent	Score	Ground	Ref
OR	Connor Macdonald	50th AFL goal	Sydney	14.12 (96) – 11.10 (76)	Sydney Cricket Ground	
OR	Tom Barrass	Club debut	Sydney	14.12 (96) – 11.10 (76)	Sydney Cricket Ground	
OR	Josh Battle	Club debut	Sydney	14.12 (96) – 11.10 (76)	Sydney Cricket Ground	
1	Conor Nash	100th AFL game	Essendon	17.9 (111) – 12.13 (85)	Melbourne Cricket Ground	
2	Jarman Impey	200th AFL game	Carlton	12.8 (80) – 8.12 (60)	Melbourne Cricket Ground	
3	Karl Amon	50th club game	Greater Western Sydney	10.16 (76) – 9.10 (64)	University of Tasmania Stadium	
5	Luke Breust	550th AFL goal	Port Adelaide	14.7 (91) – 18.13 (121)	Adelaide Oval	
5	Finn Maginness	50th AFL game	Port Adelaide	14.7 (91) – 18.13 (121)	Adelaide Oval	
6	Jack Gunston	450th club goal	Geelong	11.13 (79) – 12.14 (86)	Melbourne Cricket Ground	
7	Mabior Chol	50th club goal	West Coast	18.16 (124) – 11.8 (74)	Marvel Stadium	
8	Jack Gunston	500th AFL goal	Richmond	16.13 (119) – 6.8 (44)	Melbourne Cricket Ground	
8	Josh Weddle	50th AFL game	Richmond	16.13 (119) – 6.8 (44)	Melbourne Cricket Ground	
9	Josh Ward	50th AFL game	Melbourne	13.13 (91) – 7.14 (56)	Melbourne Cricket Ground	
10	Massimo D'Ambrosio	50th AFL game	Gold Coast	15.6 (96) – 16.8 (104)	TIO Stadium	
13	Jack Ginnivan	100th AFL goal	Western Bulldogs	12.9 (81) – 8.11 (59)	Marvel Stadium	
14	Lloyd Meek	50th club game	Adelaide	6.11 (47) – 5.14 (44)	University of Tasmania Stadium	
17	Mabior Chol	100th AFL game	St Kilda	14.10 (94) – 10.14 (74)	Marvel Stadium	
19	Nick Watson	50th AFL goal	Port Adelaide	13.9 (87) – 7.7 (49)	York Park	
19	Bailey Macdonald	1st AFL goal	Port Adelaide	13.9 (87) – 7.7 (49)	York Park	
21	Jack Ginnivan	50th club goal	Adelaide	13.9 (87) – 15.11 (101)	Adelaide Oval	
22	Mabior Chol	150th AFL goal	Collingwood	17.8 (110) – 6.10 (46)	Melbourne Cricket Ground	
24	Jack Gunston	500th club goal	Brisbane Lions	11.13 (79) – 11.23 (89)	The Gabba	
EF	Jack Gunston	250th club game	Greater Western Sydney	16.11 (107) – 13.10 (88)	ENGIE Stadium	
EF	Jai Newcombe	100th AFL game	Greater Western Sydney	16.11 (107) – 13.10 (88)	ENGIE Stadium	
SF	Jack Gunston	550th AFL goal	Adelaide	14.17 (101) – 10.7 (67)	Adelaide Oval	
PF	Massimo D'Ambrosio	50th club game	Geelong	13.7 (85) – 17.13 (115)	Melbourne Cricket Ground	
