= 2024 Hawthorn Football Club season =

128th season of the Australian Football League (AFL)

Hawthorn Football Club
2024 season
- President: Andrew Gowers
- Coach: Sam Mitchell
- Captain: James Sicily
- Home grounds: Melbourne Cricket Ground; University of Tasmania Stadium
- Home and Away: 7th
- Finals series: Semi–final
- Best and Fairest: Jai Newcombe
- Leading goalkicker: Mabior Chol (37)
- Highest home attendance: 74,141
- Lowest home attendance: 11,146
- Average home attendance: 38,501

The 2024 Hawthorn Football Club season was the club's 100th season in the Australian Football League and 123rd overall, the 25th season playing home games at the Melbourne Cricket Ground, the 24th season playing home games at the University of Tasmania Stadium and the 3rd season under head coach Sam Mitchell, and the 2nd season with James Sicily as captain.

== Club summary ==
The 2024 AFL season is the 128th season of the VFL/AFL competition since its inception in 1897; having entered the competition in 1925, is the 100th season contested by the Hawthorn Football Club. Tasmania, iiNet, and Nissan continue as the club's three major sponsors, as they have done since 2006, 2013, and 2019 respectively, while ISC will continue as the club's manufacturer of its on-and-off field apparel. Hawthorn will continue its alignment with the Box Hill Hawks Football Club in the Victorian Football League, allowing Hawthorn-listed players to play with the Box Hill Hawks when not selected in AFL matches.

== Key personnel ==
Position	Name
Board members
President	Andrew Gowers
Director	Anne-Marie Pellizzer
Director	Ian Silk
Director	James Merlino
Director	Katie Hudson
Director	Luke Stambolis
Director	Owen Wilson
Director	Tim Shearer
Director	Luke McCabe
Coaches
Senior coach	Sam Mitchell
Backline coach	Kade Simpson
Midfield coach	David Hale
Contest coach	Adrian Hickmott
Head of coaching performance & development	Brett Ratten
Head of development	Andrew Collins
Development coach	Zane Littejohn
Leadership group
Captain	James Sicily
Vice–captain	Luke Breust
Vice–captain	Dylan Moore
Leadership group member	Sam Frost
Leadership group member	Jarman Impey
Leadership group member	Mitchell Lewis
Leadership group member	Will Day

== Playing list changes ==
11 October 2022	To Hawthorn Pick 44, 2023 AFL draft Pick 63, 2023 AFL draft	To West Coast Tyler Brockman
18 October 2022	To Hawthorn Jack Ginnivan; Pick 39, 2023 AFL draft 2nd round pick, 2024 AFL draft 4th round pick, 2024 AFL draft	To Collingwood Pick 33, 2023 AFL draft 2nd round pick, 2024 AFL draft 3rd round pick, 2024 AFL draft
18 October 2022	To Hawthorn Pick 49, 2023 AFL draft	To Richmond Jacob Koschitzke
18 October 2022	To Hawthorn Jack Gunston; Pick 47, 2023 AFL draft Pick 61, 2023 AFL draft 2nd round pick, 2024 AFL draft	To Brisbane Lions Brandon Ryan; Pick 39, 2023 AFL draft Pick 54, 2023 AFL draft 4th round pick, 2024 AFL draft
18 October 2022	To Hawthorn Mabior Chol; Pick 62, 2023 AFL draft	To Gold Coast 2nd round pick, 2024 AFL draft (via Brisbane Lions)
18 October 2022	To Hawthorn Massimo D'Ambrosio	To Essendon Pick 61, 2023 AFL draft 4th round pick, 2024 AFL draft (via Collingwood)
21 November 2023	To Hawthorn 4th round pick, 2024 AFL draft	To Port Adelaide Pick 52, 2023 AFL draft
21 November 2023	To Hawthorn Pick 59, 2023 AFL draft 4th round pick, 2024 AFL draft	To Sydney Pick 53, 2023 AFL draft

=== Draft ===
==== AFL draft ====
Round	Overall pick	Player	Recruited from	ref
1	5	Nick Watson	Eastern Rangers	
1	19	Will McCabe (F/S)	Hamley Bridge	
3	46	Bodie Ryan	Glenelg	
4	56	Calsher Dear (F/S)	Sandringham Dragons	

=== Retirements and delistings ===
Date	Player	Reason	Ref
1 August 2023	Max Lynch	Retired	
26 September 2023	Emerson Jeka	Delisted	
26 September 2023	Josh Morris	Delisted	
26 September 2023	Fionn O'Hara	Delisted	
19 October 2023	Lachlan Bramble	Delisted	
19 October 2023	Fergus Greene	Delisted	
19 October 2023	Ned Long	Delisted	

== 2024 player squad ==
2024 Hawthorn Football Club squad
Senior list		Rookie list	Coaching staff
1 Harry Morrison; 2 Mitchell Lewis; 3 Jai Newcombe; 4 Jarman Impey; 5 James Worpel; 6 James Sicily (C); 7 Ned Reeves; 8 Sam Frost; 9 Changkuoth Jiath; 10 Karl Amon; 11 Conor Nash; 12 Will Day; 13 Dylan Moore (VC); 14 Jack Scrimshaw; 15 Blake Hardwick; 16 Massimo D'Ambrosio; 17 Lloyd Meek; 18 Mabior Chol; 19 Jack Gunston	20 Chad Wingard (ret); 22 Luke Breust (VC); 23 Josh Weddle; 24 Denver Grainger-Barras; 25 Josh Ward; 26 Bodie Ryan; 27 Will McCabe; 28 Cameron Mackenzie; 29 Jai Serong; 30 Sam Butler; 31 Connor MacDonald; 32 Finn Maginness; 33 Jack Ginnivan; 34 Nick Watson; 35 Calsher Dear; 42 Bailey Macdonald; 43 Jack O'Sullivan; 44 Henry Hustwaite	21 Cooper Stephens; 36 James Blanck; 37 Ethan Phillips; 38 Max Ramsden; 40 Seamus Mitchell; 41 Josh Bennetts (B); 45 Clay Tucker	Head coach: Sam Mitchell; Assistant coaches: Brett Ratten (head of coaching performance & development); Kade Simpson (backs); David Hale (midfield); Adrian Hickmott (forwards); Andy Collins (head of development); David Mackay (development coach); Arryn Siposs (development coach); Zane Littlejohn (development coach/Box Hill coach); Legend: (c) Captain(s); (vc) Vice-captain(s); Injured; Upgraded rookie(s); (ret) Retired; (B) Category B rookie; (FA) Free agent; Updated: 26 February 2024; Source(s): HFC Website; Coaches

=== Injury list ===
As of 4 September 2024

Name	Injury	Timeframe
Will Day	SC joint	TBC
Josh Bennetts	Shoulder	Season
James Blanck	Knee	Season
Sam Butler	Leg	Season
Mitchell Lewis	Knee	Season

== Pre-season ==
Rd	Date and local time	Opponent	Scores (Hawthorn's scores indicated in bold)			Venue	Attendance	Report
Rd	Date and local time	Opponent	Home	Away	Result	Venue	Attendance	Report
–	Friday, 23 February (11:00 am)	Western Bulldogs	16.12 (108)	**12.11 (83)**	Lost by 25 points	VU Whitten Oval	–	Report
–	Saturday, 2 March (6:10 pm)	Western Bulldogs	**9.8 (62)**	17.17 (119)	Lost by 57 points	University of Tasmania Stadium	–	Report

== Home-and-away season ==
Rd	Date and local time	Opponent	Scores (Hawthorn's scores indicated in bold)			Venue	Attendance	Record	Report
Rd	Date and local time	Opponent	Home	Away	Result	Venue	Attendance	Record	Report
1	Saturday, 16 March (1:45 pm)	Essendon	17.5 (107)	**11.17 (83)**	Lost by 24 points	Melbourne Cricket Ground	73,805	0–1	Report
2	Saturday, 23 March (4:35 pm)	Melbourne	**5.8 (38)**	14.9 (93)	Lost by 55 points	Melbourne Cricket Ground	43,960	0–2	Report
3	Monday, 1 April (3:20 pm)	Geelong	**10.10 (70)**	17.4 (106)	Lost by 36 points	Melbourne Cricket Ground	67,020	0–3	Report
4	Sunday, 7 April (4:40 pm)	Collingwood	11.11 (77)	**11.6 (72)**	Lost by 5 points	Adelaide Oval	43,198	0–4	Report
5	Saturday, 13 April (7:30 pm)	Gold Coast	16.13 (109)	**8.8 (56)**	Lost by 53 points	People First Stadium	13,900	0–5	Report
6	Sunday, 21 April (4:00 pm)	North Melbourne	10.8 (68)	**17.11 (113)**	Won by 45 points	Marvel Stadium	30,648	1–5	Report
7	Sunday, 28 April (4:00 pm)	Sydney	**5.12 (42)**	18.10 (118)	Lost by 76 points	Melbourne Cricket Ground	38,052	1–6	Report
8	Sunday, 5 May (4:00 pm)	Western Bulldogs	14.7 (91)	**14.14 (98)**	Won by 7 points	Marvel Stadium	29,555	2–6	Report
9	Saturday, 11 May (1:45 pm)	St Kilda	**8.10 (58)**	7.11 (53)	Won by 5 points	University of Tasmania Stadium	15,112	3–6	Report
10	Sunday, 19 May (2:50 pm)	Port Adelaide	11.14 (80)	**12.7 (79)**	Lost by 1 point	Adelaide Oval	36,190	3–7	Report
11	Sunday, 26 May (1:10 pm)	Brisbane Lions	**15.10 (100)**	10.15 (75)	Won by 25 points	Marvel Stadium	29,664	4–7	Report
12	Saturday, 1 June (1:45 pm)	Adelaide	**16.11 (107)**	12.8 (80)	Won by 27 points	Melbourne Cricket Ground	36,086	5–7	Report
13	Saturday, 8 June (1:45 pm)	Greater Western Sydney	**12.13 (85)**	12.7 (79)	Won by 6 points	University of Tasmania Stadium	11,568	6–7	Report
14	Saturday, 15 June (4:35 pm)	Richmond	6.13 (49)	**14.13 (97)**	Won by 48 points	Melbourne Cricket Ground	92,311	7–7	Report
15	Bye								
16	Sunday, 30 June (2:40 pm)	West Coast	4.9 (33)	**14.10 (94)**	Won by 61 points	Optus Stadium	49,454	8–7	Report
17	Saturday, 6 July (4:35 pm)	Geelong	16.14 (110)	**9.5 (59)**	Lost by 51 points	GMHBA Stadium	33,188	8–8	Report
18	Saturday, 13 July (1:45 pm)	Fremantle	**13.9 (87)**	10.14 (74)	Won by 13 points	University of Tasmania Stadium	11,146	9–8	Report
19	Saturday, 20 July (4:35 pm)	Collingwood	**20.13 (133)**	9.17 (67)	Won by 66 points	Melbourne Cricket Ground	74,171	10–8	Report
20	Sunday, 28 July (3:40 pm)	Adelaide	8.10 (58)	**19.10 (124)**	Won by 66 points	Adelaide Oval	41,823	11–8	Report
21	Sunday, 4 August (1:10 pm)	Greater Western Sydney	12.12 (84)	**12.10 (82)**	Lost by 2 points	Manuka Oval	13,268	11–9	Report
22	Sunday, 11 August (1:10 pm)	Carlton	5.8 (38)	**16.16 (112)**	Won by 74 points	Melbourne Cricket Ground	84,773	12–9	Report
23	Sunday, 18 August (3:20 pm)	Richmond	**19.17 (131)**	10.8 (68)	Won by 63 points	Melbourne Cricket Ground	58,231	13–9	Report
24	Saturday, 24 August (4:35 pm)	North Melbourne	**26.14 (170)**	7.4 (46)	Won by 124 points	University of Tasmania Stadium	11,392	14–9	Report

=== Ladder ===
Pos	Team	Pld	W	L	D	PF	PA	PP	Pts	Qualification
1	Sydney	23	17	6	0	2242	1769	126.7	68	Finals series
2	Port Adelaide	23	16	7	0	2011	1752	114.8	64	Finals series
3	Geelong	23	15	8	0	2164	1928	112.2	60	Finals series
4	Greater Western Sydney	23	15	8	0	2034	1864	109.1	60	Finals series
5	Brisbane Lions (P)	23	14	8	1	2130	1747	121.9	58	Finals series
6	Western Bulldogs	23	14	9	0	2171	1736	125.1	56	Finals series
**7**	Hawthorn	**23**	**14**	**9**	**0**	**2090**	**1763**	**118.5**	56	Finals series
8	Carlton	23	13	10	0	2151	1952	110.2	52	Finals series
9	Collingwood	23	12	9	2	1991	1943	102.5	52	
10	Fremantle	23	12	10	1	1964	1755	111.9	50	
11	Essendon	23	11	11	1	1892	2024	93.5	46	
12	St Kilda	23	11	12	0	1748	1758	99.4	44	
13	Gold Coast	23	11	12	0	1925	1943	99.1	44	
14	Melbourne	23	11	12	0	1785	1812	98.5	44	
15	Adelaide	23	8	14	1	1906	1923	99.1	34	
16	West Coast	23	5	18	0	1594	2339	68.1	20	
17	North Melbourne	23	3	20	0	1619	2550	63.5	12	
18	Richmond	23	2	21	0	1505	2364	63.7	8	

Source: afl.com.au
Rules for classification: 1) points; 2) percentage; 3) number of points for
(P) Premiers

== Finals ==
Rd	Date and local time	Opponent	Scores (Hawthorn's scores indicated in bold)			Venue	Attendance	Report
Rd	Date and local time	Opponent	Home	Away	Result	Venue	Attendance	Report
Elimination final	Friday, 6 September (7:40 pm)	Western Bulldogs	9.8 (62)	**14.15 (99)**	Won by 37 points	Melbourne Cricket Ground	97,828	Report
Semi-final	Friday, 13 September (7:10 pm)	Port Adelaide	11.9 (75)	**11.6 (72)**	Lost by 3 points	Adelaide Oval	52,012	Report

== Awards, records and milestones ==
=== Awards ===
==== AFL awards ====
- All-Australian team: Dylan Moore
- 22under22 team: Massimo D'Ambrosio, Jack Ginnivan, Josh Weddle

==== Club awards ====
- Peter Crimmins Medal: Jai Newcombe
- Most improved: Jack Scrimshaw
- Most courageous: James Sicily
- Lethal award: Dylan Moore
- Best player in finals: Jai Newcombe
- Best clubman: Sam Frost
- Most promising: Nick Watson
- Mackenzie community leadership award: Changkuoth Jiath

=== Records ===
==== Club records ====
- Most goal assists: Luke Breust – 237
- Most hitouts in a season: Lloyd Meek – 724
- Most inside 50s in a season: James Worpel – 127
- Most goal assists in a season: Dylan Moore – 32

=== Milestones ===
==== Round 1 ====
- Nick Watson – AFL debut.
- Mabior Chol – Hawthorn debut, 1st goal for Hawthorn.
- Jack Ginnivan – Hawthorn debut, 1st goal for Hawthorn.
- Massimo D'Ambrosio – Hawthorn debut.

==== Round 2 ====
- Nick Watson – 1st AFL goal.

==== Round 3 ====
- Blake Hardwick – 150th AFL game.
- Jarman Impey – 100th game for Hawthorn.

==== Round 4 ====
- Max Ramsden – 1st AFL goal.

==== Round 5 ====
- Karl Amon – 150th AFL game.
- Sam Mitchell – 50th AFL game as coach.

==== Round 8 ====
- Jack Ginnivan – 50th AFL game.
- Calsher Dear – 1st AFL game, 1st AFL goal.

==== Round 9 ====
- Connor MacDonald – 50th AFL game.

==== Round 10 ====
- Ethan Phillips – AFL debut.

==== Round 12 ====
- Jack Gunston – 250th AFL game.

==== Round 14 ====
- Changkuoth Jiath – 50th AFL game.

==== Round 16 ====
- Mabior Chol – 100th AFL goal.

==== Round 17 ====
- Dylan Moore – 100th AFL goal.
- Massimo D'Ambrosio – 1st goal for Hawthorn.

==== Round 19 ====
- Jack Scrimshaw – 100th AFL game.

==== Round 20 ====
- James Sicily – 150th AFL game.

==== Round 23 ====
- Harry Morrison – 100th AFL game.
- Jack Scrimshaw – 100th game for Hawthorn.

==== Round 24 ====
- Lloyd Meek – 50th AFL game.

==== Semi-final ====
- Luke Breust – 300th AFL game.
- Dylan Moore – 100th AFL game.

== VFL ==
Hawthorn continued its reserves affiliation with the Box Hill Hawks in the Victorian Football League (VFL) in 2024 for the 25th season. This allowed Hawthorn-listed players to play with Box Hill when not selected in AFL matches.

Ethan Phillips joined Box Hill in December 2023 ahead of the 2024 VFL season, but he was signed to Hawthorn's rookie list in the AFL pre-season supplemental selection period (SSP) on 17 February 2024 after defender James Blanck suffered an ACL injury.

=== 2024 player squad ===
2024 Box Hill Hawks squad
List		Coaching staff
37 Ethan Phillips (SSP); 50 Max Hall (D); 51 Nathan Philactides; 52 Ben Cavarra; 54 Lane Ward; 55 Callum Porter **(C)**; 56 Heath Bidgood; 57 Jaylon Thorpe; 59 Jed Rule; 60 Ed Phillips; 62 Stuart Horner **(VC)**; 63 Billy Hicks; 64 Toby Cossor; 65 Andreas Stefanakis; 66 Callum Brown; 67 Christian Moraes; 68 Daniel Wood; 69 Noah Bourke	70 Jake Arundell; 71 Lachlan Bryce; 72 Andrew Mathieson; 73 Seb Amoroso; 74 Lachlan Guymer; 75 Josh Tovey; 76 Remy Maclean; 77 Ben De Bolfo; 78 Kye Agosta; 79 Jett Latchford; 80 Mitchell Sruk; 81 Iliro Smit (D); 82 Oliver Horlock; 82 Ned Maginness; 83 Zach Felsbourg; 84 Jye Peacock; 88 James Parsons; 99 Tyler Brown	**Head coach**: Zane Littlejohn; **Assistant coaches**: Kristian Height; Cam Howat; Clayton Sturzaker; Ben Cavarra (playing assistant coach); Legend: (c) Captain(s); (vc) Vice-captain(s); Injured; (ret) Retired; (D) Drafted in 2024 AFL mid-season rookie draft; (SSP) Drafted in 2024 AFL supplemental selection period; Updated: 11 June 2024; Source(s):
