= Luke McCabe =

Australian rules footballer (born 1976)

Personal information
- Born: 10 August 1976 (age 50)
- Original team: Central District (SANFL)
- Debut: Round 1, 1995, Hawthorn vs. Brisbane Bears, at Waverley Park
- Height: 183 cm (6 ft 0 in)
- Weight: 82 kg (181 lb)

Playing career^{1}
Years	Club	Games (Goals)
1995–2004	Hawthorn	138 (12)
2005–2006, 2008	Central District	58
- ^{1} Playing statistics correct to the end of 2008.

Career highlights
- Peter Crimmins Medal (2nd HFC B&F): 1998

Luke McCabe (born 10 August 1976) is a former Australian rules footballer who played with Hawthorn in the Australian Football League (AFL) and Central District in the South Australian National Football League (SANFL).

McCabe was a small defender who usually played in the back pockets. He was recruited by Hawthorn at pick 15 in the 1993 National Draft but took a while to establish himself in the team, playing over 20 games in a season for the first time in 1998. He finished that season with a second placing in Hawthorn's best and fairest awards and the following season was a member of their pre season premiership side.

He is remembered for his participation in one of the "memorable moments" between Hawthorn and Melbourne when, in round 1, 2002, he was on the receiving end of a mighty hip and shoulder from David Neitz on his way to snap an inspirational goal.

McCabe returned to Central District for the 2005 SANFL season and was an integral part of the Bulldogs winning their third consecutive premiership. McCabe was awarded the Jack Oatey Medal for being the best on ground in the Grand Final. He retired from senior football following the end of the 2006 season due to work commitments. However, McCabe returned to Central District for the 2008 season.

== Personal ==
In November 2023, his son Will McCabe, was drafted by Hawthorn. Will made his debut in round 6 of the 2026 season.
