= Jack Dalton (footballer, born 2007) =

Australian rules footballer (born 2007)

- Dalton playing for Box Hill in 2026

Personal information
- Full name: Jack Dalton
- Born: 5 April 2007 (age 19)
- Original team: Sandringham Dragons/Xavier College
- Draft: No. 34, 2025 AFL draft
- Debut: 6 April 2026, Hawthorn vs. Geelong, at Melbourne Cricket Ground
- Height: 177 cm (5 ft 10 in)
- Weight: 80 kg (176 lb)
- Position: Midfielder

Club information
- Current club: Hawthorn
- Number: 34

Playing career^{1}
Years	Club	Games (Goals)
2026–	Hawthorn	5 (3)
- ^{1} Playing statistics correct to the end of 2026.

Career highlights
- VFL premiership player: 2026

Jack Dalton (born 5 April 2007) is an Australian rules footballer who plays for the Hawthorn Football Club in the Australian Football League (AFL).

== Early career ==
On the eve of his top-age season as an 18-year-old he broke both wrists in a freak gym accident. While initially told he would miss twelve months of football, Dalton's rehab shattered expectations. He had worked his way back from a point where both arms were in casts to best on ground performances within three months. He collected 35 disposals in wet and windy conditions for the Dragons.

=== AFL career ===
Dalton was selected with pick 34 in the 2025 AFL draft by the Hawthorn Football Club. He made his debut in the round four clash against Geelong on Easter Monday, in front of a crowd of almost 85,000 spectators. Dalton had 10 disposals and kicked a behind. Dalton ended up playing five games at AFL level for Hawthorn in 2026, kicking three goals, and also won a premiership with their VFL-affiliated side, the Box Hill Hawks.

== Statistics ==
Updated to the end of 2026.

Legend
G	Goals	K	Kicks	D	Disposals	T	Tackles
B	Behinds	H	Handballs	M	Marks

Season	Team	No.	Games	Totals							Averages (per game)							Votes
Season	Team	No.	Games	G	B	K	H	D	M	T	G	B	K	H	D	M	T	Votes
2026	Hawthorn	34	5	3	3	25	31	56	16	19	0.6	0.6	5.0	6.2	11.2	3.2	3.8	0
Career			5	3	3	25	31	56	16	19	0.6	0.6	5.0	6.2	11.2	3.2	3.8	0

== Honours and achievements ==
Team

- VFL premiership player (Box Hill): 2026
