= Cooper Stephens =

Australian rules footballer (born 2001)

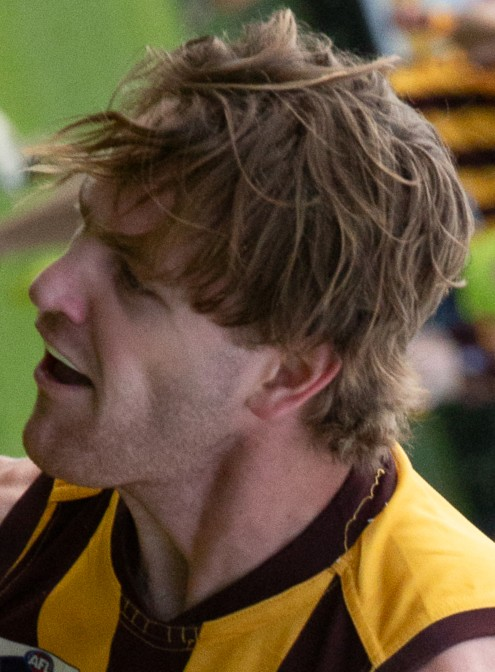
- Stephens in August 2024

Personal information
- Full name: Cooper Stephens
- Born: 17 January 2001 (age 25)
- Original teams: Colac, Geelong Falcons
- Draft: No. 16, 2019 national draft No. 3, 2024 rookie draft
- Debut: Round 8, 2022, Geelong vs. Greater Western Sydney, at Manuka Oval, Canberra
- Height: 188 cm (6 ft 2 in)
- Weight: 86 kg (190 lb)
- Position: Midfielder

Playing career^{1}
Years	Club	Games (Goals)
2020–2022	Geelong	7 (0)
2023–2024	Hawthorn	0 (0)
Total		7 (0)
- ^{1} Playing statistics correct to the end of the 2024 season.

Cooper Stephens (born 17 January 2001) is a former professional Australian rules footballer who played for Geelong and Hawthorn in the Australian Football League. Stephens played seven matches for Geelong; however, he never played a senior match at Hawthorn.

== Early life ==
Stephens broke his leg at the start of his final underage year. Despite being disappointed, he took the opportunity to train with the Geelong Falcons high performance manager and was in good shape for the combine testing at the end of the year.

== AFL career ==
Stephens was drafted by the Geelong Football Club with the 16th selection in the 2019 AFL draft from Geelong Falcons in the NAB League. He made his debut in Canberra against the Greater Western Sydney in round 8 2022. He managed to play seven senior games in his debut season.

Stephens was traded to Hawthorn in a three way deal that saw Oliver Henry move to Geelong and Tom Mitchell move to Collingwood.

At the end of his first year at the club, Stephens was delisted to be re-drafted in the rookie draft. At the end of his second season at the club, he was again delisted. Stephens never played a senior game for the club.

== Statistics ==
Updated to the end of the 2024 season.

Legend
G	Goals	K	Kicks	D	Disposals	T	Tackles
B	Behinds	H	Handballs	M	Marks

Season	Team	No.	Games	Totals							Averages (per game)							Votes
Season	Team	No.	Games	G	B	K	H	D	M	T	G	B	K	H	D	M	T	Votes
2020 (Note: The 2020 season was played with 17 home-and-away matches per team (down from 22) and 16-minute quarters with time on (down from 20-minute quarters with time on) due to the impact of the COVID-19 pandemic.)	Geelong	12	0	—	—	—	—	—	—	—	—	—	—	—	—	—	—	0
2021	Geelong	12	0	—	—	—	—	—	—	—	—	—	—	—	—	—	—	0
2022	Geelong	12	7	0	0	36	40	76	14	11	0.0	0.0	5.1	5.7	10.8	2.0	1.5	0
2023	Hawthorn	21	0	—	—	—	—	—	—	—	—	—	—	—	—	—	—	0
2024	Hawthorn	21	0	—	—	—	—	—	—	—	—	—	—	—	—	—	—	0
Career			7	0	0	36	40	76	14	11	0.0	0.0	5.1	5.7	10.8	2.0	1.5	0
