= Aidan Schubert =

Australian rules footballer (born 2007)

- Schubert playing for Box Hill in 2026

Personal information
- Full name: Aidan Schubert
- Born: 21 December 2007 (age 18)
- Original team: Central District
- Draft: No. 23, 2025 national draft
- Debut: Round 21, 2026, Hawthorn vs. North Melbourne, at University of Tasmania Stadium
- Height: 195 cm (6 ft 5 in)
- Position: Key forward

Club information
- Current club: Gold Coast

Playing career^{1}
Years	Club	Games (Goals)
2026	Hawthorn	1 (0)
2027–	Gold Coast	0 (0)
Total		1 (0)
- ^{1} Playing statistics correct to the end of the 2026 season.

Aidan Schubert (born 21 December 2007) is a professional Australian rules footballer playing for the Gold Coast Suns in the Australian Football League (AFL). He previously played for the Hawthorn Football Club in 2026.

== AFL career ==
Schubert was selected by Hawthorn with the 23rd pick of the 2025 national draft. Schubert would make his debut against North Melbourne in round 21, 2026 at University of Tasmania Stadium. Schubert was dropped the following week and didn't feature at AFL level again in 2026, however he did win a premiership with Hawthorn's VFL-affiliated side, the Box Hill Hawks.

In October 2026, Schubert requested a trade from the Hawks to the Gold Coast Suns, amid Ben King's looming move the opposite way and Calsher Dear's commitment at Hawthorn. Schubert, a contracted forward, made the request seeking more opportunities at AFL level. Schubert was traded to the Suns alongside teammate Sam Butler on October 12.

== Statistics ==
Updated to the end of 2026.

Legend
G	Goals	K	Kicks	D	Disposals	T	Tackles
B	Behinds	H	Handballs	M	Marks

Season	Team	No.	Games	Totals							Averages (per game)							Votes
Season	Team	No.	Games	G	B	K	H	D	M	T	G	B	K	H	D	M	T	Votes
2026	Hawthorn	29	1	0	2	6	3	9	5	1	0.0	2.0	6.0	3.0	9.0	5.0	1.0	0
Career			1	0	2	6	3	9	5	1	0.0	2.0	6.0	3.0	9.0	5.0	1.0	0

== Honours and achievements ==
Team

- VFL premiership player (Box Hill): 2026
