= Matt Hill (Australian footballer) =

Australian rules footballer (born 2004)

- Hill playing for Box Hill in April 2026

Personal information
- Full name: Matthew Hill
- Born: 1 January 2004 (age 22); Katherine, Northern Territory
- Original team: Yeppoon Swans (AFL Capricornia)
- Draft: Category B rookie, 2025 rookie draft
- Debut: Round 18, 2025, Hawthorn vs. Melbourne, at UTAS Stadium
- Height: 187 cm (6 ft 2 in)

Club information
- Current club: Hawthorn
- Number: 41

Playing career^{1}
Years	Club	Games (Goals)
2025–	Hawthorn	2 (2)
- ^{1} Playing statistics correct to the end of 2026.

Career highlights
- VFL premiership player: 2026

Matthew Hill (born 1 January 2004) is an Australian rules footballer who plays for the Hawthorn Football Club in the Australian Football League (AFL).

== Early life ==
Hill was born in Katherine in the Northern Territory. At the age of 13, he moved to Queensland to attend St. Brendan's College in the town of Yeppoon.

He played both Australian rules football and rugby league as a teenager, including for the Yeppoon Swans in the AFL Capricornia competition and the Brisbane Broncos Academy. Hill was invited to train with the Gold Coast Suns Academy at the age of 15. He continued playing rugby league with the Melbourne Storm Academy, scoring 29 tries while playing as a wing and centre in the Jersey Flegg Cup.

== Career ==
After moving to Melbourne, Hill joined the Hawthorn Football Club in the Australian Football League (AFL) as a Category B rookie in October 2024. He spent his first year at Hawthorn playing for the Box Hill Hawks, the club's reserves affiliate in the Victorian Football League (VFL), where he kicked 15 goals in 18 matches.

Hill made his AFL debut alongside Noah Mraz in round 17 of the 2026 season against Melbourne at University of Tasmania Stadium. He signed a two-year contract extension on 5 August 2026 to remain at Hawthorn until at least the end of 2028.

== Statistics ==
Updated to the end of 2026.

Legend
G	Goals	K	Kicks	D	Disposals	T	Tackles
B	Behinds	H	Handballs	M	Marks

Season	Team	No.	Games	Totals							Averages (per game)							Votes
Season	Team	No.	Games	G	B	K	H	D	M	T	G	B	K	H	D	M	T	Votes
2026	Hawthorn	40	2	2	1	5	8	13	0	2	1.0	0.5	2.5	4.0	6.5	0.0	1.0	0
Career			2	2	1	5	8	13	0	2	1.0	0.5	2.5	4.0	6.5	0.0	1.0	0
