= Cam Nairn =

Australian rules footballer (born 2007)

- Nairn playing for Box Hill in 2026

Personal information
- Full name: Cameron Nairn
- Born: 15 October 2007 (age 19)
- Original teams: Central Districts, South Australian National Football League (SANFL)
- Draft: No. 20, 2025 AFL draft, Hawthorn
- Debut: 21 May 2026, Hawthorn vs. Adelaide, at UTAS Stadium
- Position: Half-forward flanker / midfielder

Club information
- Current club: Hawthorn
- Number: 22

Playing career^{1}
| Years | Club | Games (Goals) |
| 2026– | Hawthorn | 4 (0) |
- ^{1} Playing statistics correct to the end of 2026.

Career highlights
- VFL premiership player: 2026

Cameron Nairn (born 15 October 2007) is an Australian rules footballer who plays for the Hawthorn Football Club in the Australian Football League (AFL). He was selected by Hawthorn with the 20th selection in the 2025 AFL national draft.

A half-forward flanker / midfielder, Nairn made his debut in round 11 of the 2026 season against Adelaide at UTAS Stadium, Launceston.

== Early life ==
Nairn was born in South Australia on 15 October 2007. Before being selected by Hawthorn, he played for the Central District Football Club in the South Australian National Football League (SANFL). Nairn kicked seven goals in the U18 National Championships, leading South Australia to victory over Western Australia.

== Career ==
Nairn played in the practice match against Geelong at the Kennedy Community Centre. On 21 May 2026, Nairn made his senior debut in round 11 of the 2026 season against Adelaide at UTAS Stadium, Launceston.

== Statistics ==
Updated to the end of 2026.

Legend
| G | Goals | K | Kicks | D | Disposals | T | Tackles |
| B | Behinds | H | Handballs | M | Marks |

| Season | Team | No. | Games | Totals | | | | | | | Averages (per game) | | | | | | | Votes |
| Season | Team | No. | Games | G | B | K | H | D | M | T | G | B | K | H | D | M | T | Votes |
|---|---|---|---|---|---|---|---|---|---|---|---|---|---|---|---|---|---|---|
| 2026 | Hawthorn | 22 | 4 | 0 | 0 | 30 | 22 | 52 | 17 | 2 | 0.0 | 0.0 | 7.5 | 5.5 | 13.0 | 4.3 | 0.5 | 0 |
| Career | | | 4 | 0 | 0 | 30 | 22 | 52 | 17 | 2 | 0.0 | 0.0 | 7.5 | 5.5 | 13.0 | 4.3 | 0.5 | 0 |

== Honours and achievements ==
Team

- VFL premiership player (Box Hill): 2026
