= Max Beattie =

Australian rules footballer (born 2003)

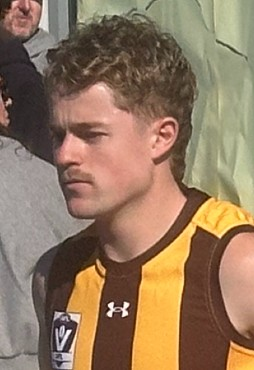
- Beattie in August 2026

Personal information
- Born: 18 November 2003 (age 22)
- Original teams: Wodonga Raiders (OMFNL); Murray Bushrangers (Talent League); Woodville-West Torrens (SANFL)
- Draft: No. 12, 2026 mid-season rookie draft
- Debut: Round 23, 2026, Hawthorn vs. Collingwood, at the MCG
- Height: 175 cm (5 ft 9 in)
- Position: Forward

Club information
- Current club: Hawthorn
- Number: 40

Playing career^{1}
Years	Club	Games (Goals)
2026–	Hawthorn	4 (3)
- ^{1} Playing statistics correct to the end of 2026.

Max Beattie (born 18 November 2003) is a professional Australian rules footballer playing for the Hawthorn Football Club in the Australian Football League (AFL).

== Pre-AFL career ==
Beattie played junior football for the Wodonga Raiders juniors. He debuted for the Wodonga seniors side in 2021. In 2022 he played two games for the Murray Bushrangers in the Talent League.

In November 2022 , Beattie joined Woodville-West Torrens for the 2023 SANFL season. He would go on to play 56 matches for Woodville-West Torrens over four seasons.

Ahead of the 2024 AFL season, Beattie was invited to train for a list spot with Fremantle during the pre-season supplemental selection period, however he failed to gain a spot on their list.

== AFL career ==
Beattie was selected by Hawthorn with pick 12 of the 2026 mid-season rookie draft. After joining mid-year, Beattie was injured in his first game at Box Hill. He made his debut in round 23 of the 2026 AFL season.

== Statistics ==
Updated to the end of 2026.

Legend
G	Goals	K	Kicks	D	Disposals	T	Tackles
B	Behinds	H	Handballs	M	Marks

Season	Team	No.	Games	Totals							Averages (per game)							Votes
Season	Team	No.	Games	G	B	K	H	D	M	T	G	B	K	H	D	M	T	Votes
2026	Hawthorn	40	4	3	3	21	9	30	7	7	0.8	0.8	5.3	2.3	7.5	1.8	1.8	0
Career			4	3	3	21	9	30	7	7	0.8	0.8	5.3	2.3	7.5	1.8	1.8	0
