= Flynn Perez =

Australian rules footballer (born 2001)

Flynn Pérez
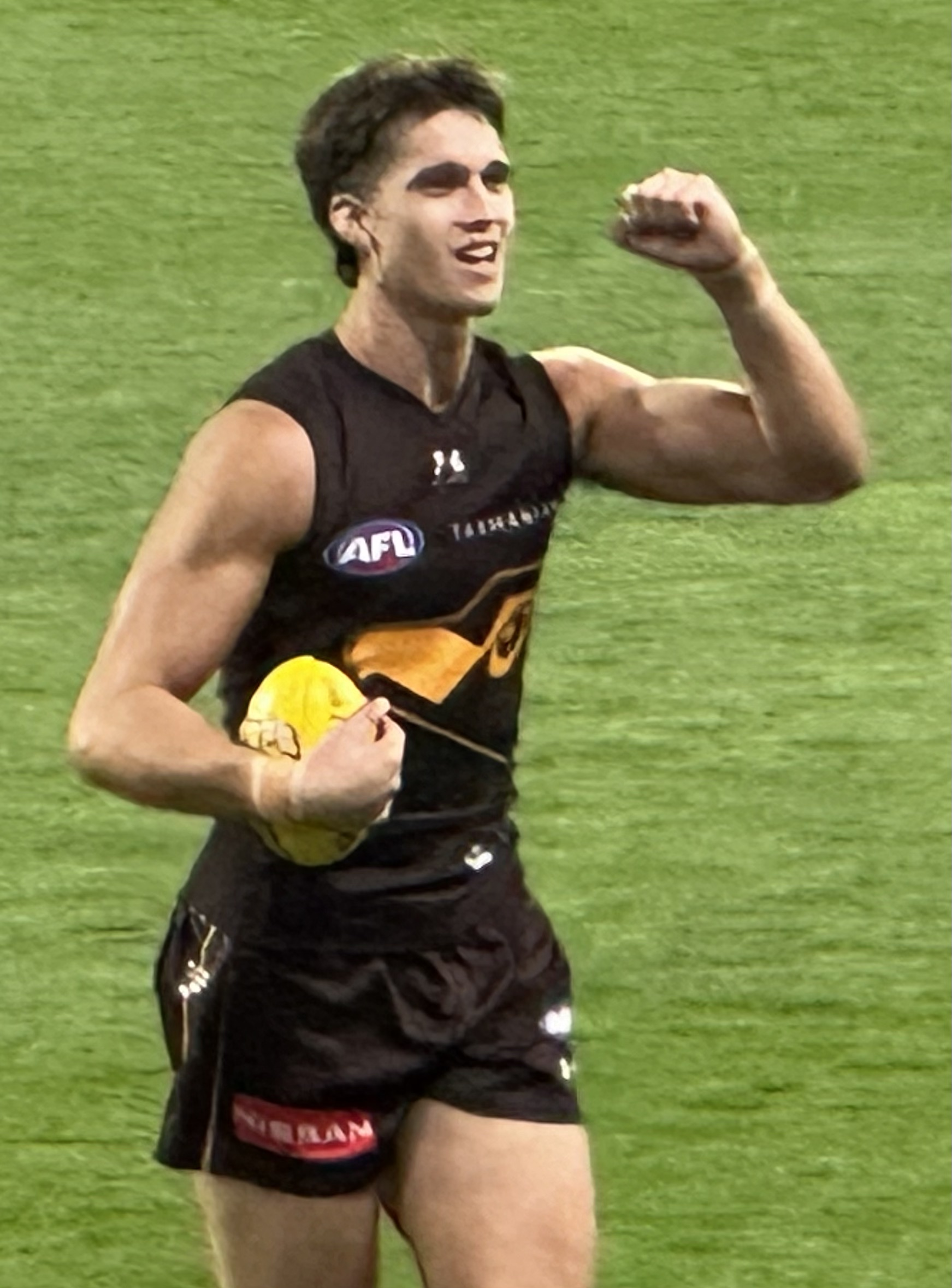
- Pérez playing for Hawthorn in 2026

Personal information
- Born: 25 August 2001 (age 25); Bendigo, Victoria
- Original team: Bendigo Pioneers
- Draft: No. 35, 2019 AFL draft, North Melbourne
- Debut: 5 September 2020, North Melbourne vs. Port Adelaide, at Carrara Stadium
- Height: 187 cm (6 ft 2 in)
- Weight: 82 kg (181 lb)
- Position: Defender

Playing career^{1}
Years	Club	Games (Goals)
2020–2023	North Melbourne	24 (1)
2026	Hawthorn	7 (0)
Total		31 (1)
- ^{1} Playing statistics correct to the end of 2026.

Career highlights
- SANFL premiership: 2025; VFL premiership player: 2026

Flynn Pérez (born 25 August 2001) is a former professional Australian rules footballer who played for the North Melbourne Football Club and the Hawthorn Football Club in the Australian Football League (AFL). He was recruited by North Melbourne with the 35th draft pick in the 2019 AFL draft. He was delisted by North Melbourne at the end of the 2023 season, having played 24 games. Pérez later helped Sturt win the SANFL premiership in 2025 before being signed by Hawthorn and returning to the AFL.

== Early life and football career ==
Pérez was born in Bendigo, Victoria. He was educated at Catherine McAuley College.

Pérez played football for the Sandhurst Football Netball Club. He was named to play in Team Bartel in the Under 17 Futures grand final curtain raiser. Pérez played for the Bendigo Pioneers in the NAB League. He played 15 games and averaged 16.5 disposals in his 2018 season, but suffered an ACL injury and missed the entire 2019 season.

== Senior career ==
=== North Melbourne ===
Pérez debuted in North Melbourne's 36 point loss to Port Adelaide in the 16th round of the 2020 AFL season. On debut, Pérez collected nine disposals, took four marks and made three tackles. Pérez's career at North Melbourne was hampered by two knee reconstructions, the second one in 2021. Pérez was delisted from the North Melbourne Football Club in October 2023.

=== Sturt (SANFL) ===
Pérez moved to South Australia to join Sturt in 2024. At Sturt, he played 28 games and kicked two goals. He played for South Australia in an interstate game. He helped the club win the SANFL premiership in 2025.

=== Hawthorn ===
Pérez was signed by Hawthorn prior to the 2026 season through the pre-season supplemental selection period. He was selected in April, making his club debut against Geelong. Throughout 2026, Pérez featured in seven AFL games for Hawthorn, while also winning a premiership with their VFL-affiliated side, the Box Hill Hawks. Perez was delisted at the end of the season, but asked to continue training in the hope of receiving a lifeline in the pre-season Supplemental Selection Period.

== Statistics ==
Updated to the end of 2026.

Legend
G	Goals	K	Kicks	D	Disposals	T	Tackles
B	Behinds	H	Handballs	M	Marks

Season	Team	No.	Games	Totals							Averages (per game)							Votes
Season	Team	No.	Games	G	B	K	H	D	M	T	G	B	K	H	D	M	T	Votes
2020 (Note: The 2020 season was played with 17 home-and-away matches per team (down from 22) and 16-minute quarters with time on (down from 20-minute quarters with time on) due to the impact of the COVID-19 pandemic.)	North Melbourne	39	3	0	0	15	13	28	7	8	0.0	0.0	5.0	4.3	9.3	2.3	2.7	0
2022	North Melbourne	39	16	0	0	118	80	198	50	35	0.0	0.0	7.4	5.0	12.4	3.1	2.2	0
2023	North Melbourne	39	5	1	0	32	21	53	17	9	0.2	0.0	6.4	4.2	10.6	3.4	1.8	0
2026 (Note: Perez played his first game for Hawthorn in jumper #40 due to an ill-fitting jumper #39.)	Hawthorn	39	7	0	0	36	43	79	14	25	0.0	0.0	5.1	6.1	11.3	2.0	3.6	0
Career			31	1	0	201	157	358	88	77	0.0	0.0	6.5	5.1	11.5	2.8	2.5	0

== Honours and achievements ==
Team

- VFL premiership player (Box Hill): 2026
