= Bodie Ryan =

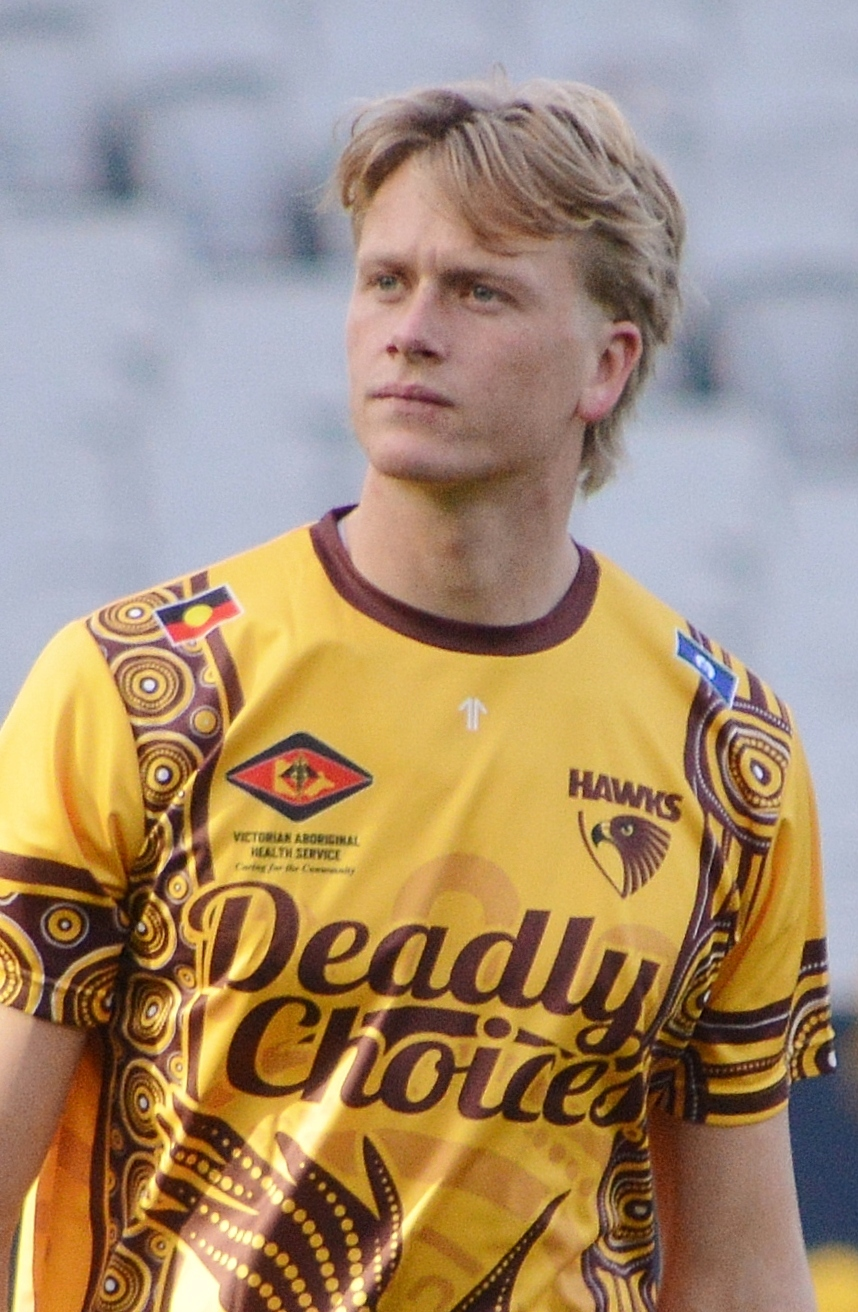
- Ryan in May 2026

Personal information
- Born: 20 April 2005 (age 21)
- Draft: No. 46, 2023 national draft
- Debut: Round 9, 2026, Hawthorn vs. Fremantle, at Optus Stadium
- Height: 187 cm (6 ft 2 in)
- Position: Defender

Club information
- Current club: Melbourne

Playing career^{1}
Years	Club	Games (Goals)
2024–2026	Hawthorn	5 (0)
2027–	Melbourne	0 (0)
Total		5 (0)
- ^{1} Playing statistics correct to the end of 2026.

Career highlights
- VFL premiership player: 2026

Bodie Ryan (born 20 April 2005) is a professional Australian rules footballer who plays for the Melbourne Football Club in the Australian Football League (AFL) He previously played for the Hawthorn Football Club.

== AFL career ==
=== Hawthorn (2024–2026) ===
Ryan was drafted by the Hawthorn Football Club with pick 46 in the 2023 AFL draft. Ryan made his debut in round 9 of the 2026 AFL season, having 7 disposals in a 15-point loss to Fremantle. During this game, he notably entered the field, outside of the interchange gates, which led to him getting a possession almost instantly and leading to a Hawthorn goal causing controversy.

Ryan played a total of five games for Hawthorn at AFL level, his final game being a 35-point loss to future club Melbourne in round 18. After being dropped from the AFL side after this match, Ryan played the rest of the season in the VFL for the Box Hill Hawks, playing in a winning VFL premiership against Geelong. Ryan was delisted by Hawthorn following the conclusion of the 2026 season.

=== Melbourne (2027–present) ===
Despite having been delisted, Ryan was traded to Melbourne minutes before the trade deadline in the 2026 trade period for pick 107.

== Statistics ==
Updated to the end of 2026.

Legend
G	Goals	K	Kicks	D	Disposals	T	Tackles
B	Behinds	H	Handballs	M	Marks

Season	Team	No.	Games	Totals							Averages (per game)							Votes
Season	Team	No.	Games	G	B	K	H	D	M	T	G	B	K	H	D	M	T	Votes
2026	Hawthorn	26	5	0	0	39	12	51	19	6	0.0	0.0	7.8	2.4	10.2	3.8	1.2	0
Career			5	0	0	39	12	51	19	6	0.0	0.0	7.8	2.4	10.2	3.8	1.2	0

== Honours and achievements ==
Team

- VFL premiership player (Box Hill): 2026
