= James Sicily =

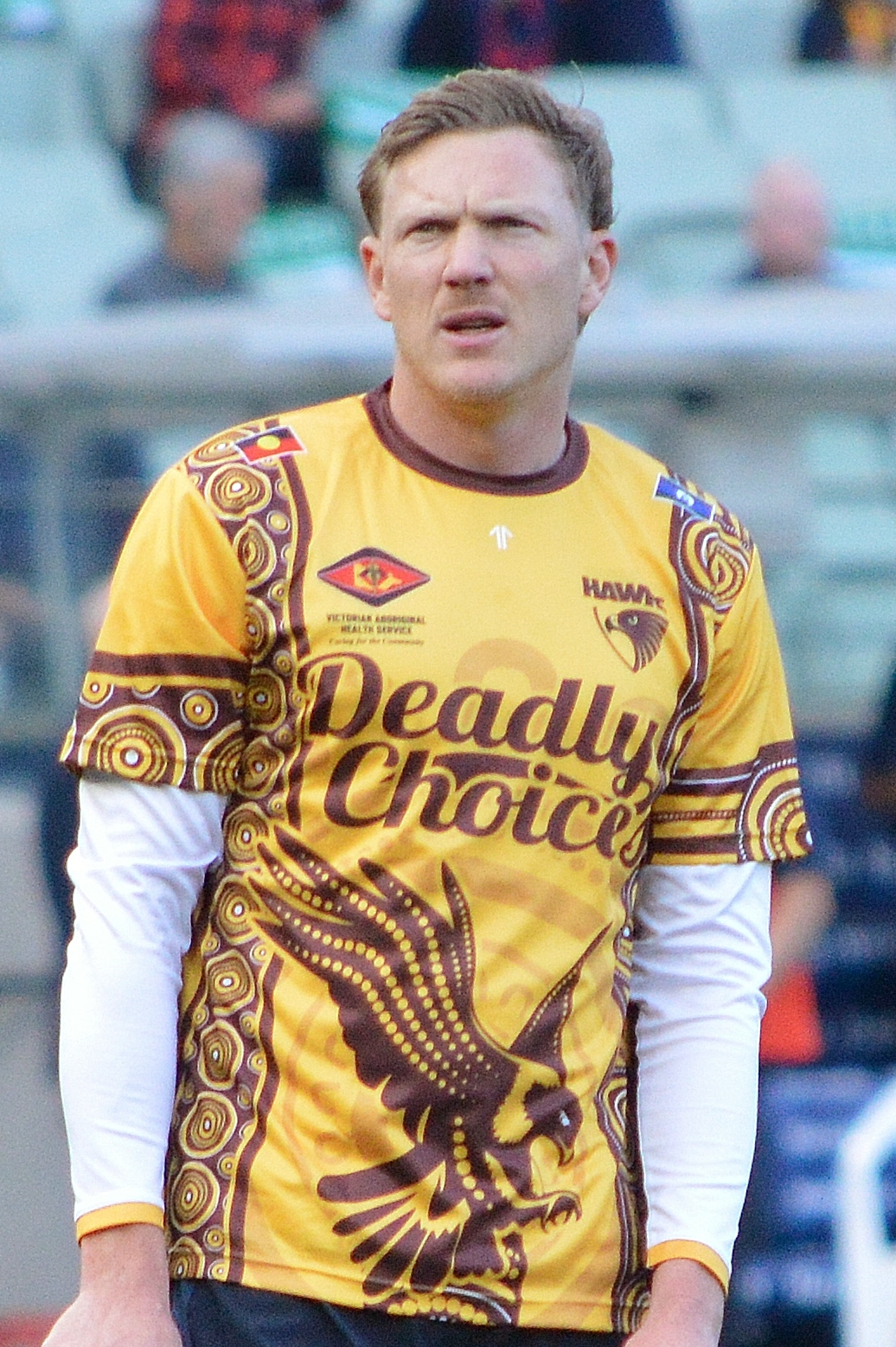
- Sicily with Hawthorn in May 2026

Personal information
- Full name: James Sicily
- Born: 6 January 1995 (age 31)
- Original teams: Keilor (EDFL); Western Jets (TAC Cup)
- Draft: No. 56, 2013 national draft
- Debut: Round 2, 2015, Hawthorn vs. Essendon, at MCG
- Height: 188 cm (6 ft 2 in)
- Weight: 90 kg (198 lb)
- Position: Key Defender

Club information
- Current club: Hawthorn
- Number: 6

Playing career^{1}
Years	Club	Games (Goals)
2014–	Hawthorn	203 (78)

Representative team honours^{2}
Years	Team	Games (Goals)
2020	Victoria	1 (0)
- ^{1} Playing statistics correct to the end of 2026.^{2} Representative statistics correct as of 2020.

Career highlights
- Hawthorn captain: 2023–2025; co-captain: 2026–; Peter Crimmins Medal: 2022; All-Australian team: 2023; 22under22team: 2017

James Sicily (born 6 January 1995) is a professional Australian rules footballer and the current co-captain of the Hawthorn Football Club in the Australian Football League (AFL), alongside Jai Newcombe.

== Early career ==
Sicily's junior career was spent playing for the Keilor Football Club. In 2013, Sicily kicked 26 goals from 16 games for the Western Jets and represented Vic Metro at the National Championships.

== AFL career ==
Sicily was drafted by the Hawthorn Football Club with the fifty-sixth pick in the 2013 AFL draft. In 2014, he was widely considered Box Hill’s best player in the losing grand final, kicking a team-high three goals, and finishing with 15 disposals and five marks.

He made his AFL debut against Essendon in round 2, 2015 starting as the sub. He came on replacing the injured James Frawley in the first quarter and later kicked a goal. He went on to play three games for the year.

In the absence of the injured Jarryd Roughead, Sicily was named in Hawthorn's team for the opening round of the 2016 AFL season, kicking 4 goals against West Coast in round 2 and kicking the match winning goal in round 3 against the Western Bulldogs. He was named as the round 13 nominee for the Rising Star after kicking a career high five goals and recording 13 disposals and 5 marks. 2016 was regarded as Sicily's breakout season.

During the 2017 season, Sicily, who had previously been a forward, was shifted to the backline, after being dropped from the team while playing as a forward. He impressed in that position, but nonetheless at the end of the season was still the subject of some uncertainty around his position in the team. On August 22, 2017, Sicily signed a three-year contract extension keeping him at the club until 2020.

Sicily was suspended for one match in the early stages of the 2018 season for kneeing Geelong captain Joel Selwood. Notwithstanding this, Sicily was widely tipped to be on track for a nomination to the All-Australian team of that year before breaking bones in his wrist in Round 17, only returning during the finals series. Despite this injury, Sicily had a season widely perceived as excellent, and was considered to have potential to become one of the league's best defenders.

Sicily had another good season in 2019, being selected in the extended All-Australian squad for that year, the only Hawthorn player to do so. He was considered especially important to Hawthorn's defence. At the end of the season, he re-signed with the club till at least the year 2022.

Sicily missed the 2021 season as he was recovering from an ACL injury sustained during the 2020 season.

On 16 May 2022, Sicily announced that he had agreed to a 5-year contract extension with Hawthorn, tying him to the club until at least the end of 2027.

In February 2023, Sicily was appointed the 38th captain of Hawthorn, with the 28-year-old succeeding the retired Ben McEvoy who served in the role for two seasons.

In Round 11 2023, Sicily had a career high 43 disposals against St Kilda in the Hawks' 10-point win.

In January 2026, James Sicily was appointed a co-captain with Jai Newcombe.

== On-field temperament ==
Sicily is widely regarded and known for having a short temper, something he himself has acknowledged.

== Statistics ==
Updated to the end of 2026.

Legend
G	Goals	K	Kicks	D	Disposals	T	Tackles
B	Behinds	H	Handballs	M	Marks
†	Led the league for the season

Season	Team	No.	Games	Totals							Averages (per game)							Votes
Season	Team	No.	Games	G	B	K	H	D	M	T	G	B	K	H	D	M	T	Votes
2015	Hawthorn	21	3	4	1	19	19	38	11	3	1.3	0.3	6.3	6.3	12.7	3.7	1.0	0
2016	Hawthorn	21	22	30	18	168	84	252	100	43	1.4	0.8	7.6	3.8	11.5	4.5	2.0	3
2017	Hawthorn	21	19	13	9	204	148	352	131	22	0.7	0.5	10.7	7.8	18.5	6.9	1.2	1
2018	Hawthorn	6	16	6	1	264	109	373	114	26	0.4	0.1	16.5	6.8	23.3	7.1	1.6	8
2019	Hawthorn	6	22	3	2	352	112	464	158	32	0.1	0.1	16.0	5.1	21.1	7.2	1.5	8
2020 (Note: The 2020 season was played with 17 home-and-away matches per team (down from 22) and 16-minute quarters with time on (down from 20-minute quarters with time on) due to the impact of the COVID-19 pandemic.)	Hawthorn	6	11	2	1	147	50	197	62	9	0.2	0.1	13.4	4.5	17.9	5.6	0.8	0
2022	Hawthorn	6	22	1	3	418	106	524	190^{†}	32	0.0	0.1	19.0	4.8	23.8	8.6	1.5	7
2023	Hawthorn	6	19	2	4	324	177	501	189	29	0.1	0.2	17.1	9.3	26.4	9.9^{†}	1.5	12
2024	Hawthorn	6	22	9	7	337	136	473	167	30	0.4	0.3	15.3	6.2	21.5	7.6	1.4	4
2025	Hawthorn	6	23	6	3	305	144	449	153	36	0.3	0.1	13.3	6.3	19.5	6.7	1.6	9
2026	Hawthorn	6	24	2	3	335	172	507	171	38	0.1	0.1	14.0	7.2	21.1	7.2	1.6	3
Career			203	78	52	2873	1257	4130	1446	300	0.4	0.3	14.2	6.2	20.3	7.1	1.5	55

== Honours and achievements ==
Team

- McClelland Trophy (Hawthorn): 2024
- Minor premiership (Box Hill): 2015

Individual

- All-Australian team: 2023
- Hawthorn captain: 2023–2025; co-captain: 2026–
- Peter Crimmins Medal: 2022
- Silk-Miller Medal: 2026
- 22under22 team: 2017
- AFL Rising Star nominee: 2016
- Victoria Australian rules football team: 2020
