= Sam Butler (footballer, born 2003) =

Australian rules footballer (born 2003)

- Butler playing for Box Hill in 2026

Personal information
- Full name: Samuel Butler
- Born: 10 February 2003 (age 23)
- Original team: Greater Western Victoria Rebels (Talent League)
- Draft: No. 23, 2021 national draft
- Debut: Round 9, 2022, Hawthorn vs. Richmond, at Melbourne Cricket Ground
- Height: 184 cm (6 ft 0 in)
- Weight: 76 kg (168 lb)
- Position: Forward

Club information
- Current club: Gold Coast

Playing career^{1}
Years	Club	Games (Goals)
2022–2026	Hawthorn	33 (19)
2027–	Gold Coast	0 (0)
Total		33 (19)
- ^{1} Playing statistics correct to the end of the 2026 season.

Samuel Butler (born 10 February 2003) is a professional Australian rules footballer playing for the Gold Coast Suns in the Australian Football League (AFL). He previously played for the Hawthorn Football Club from 2022 to 2026.

== Early life and junior football ==
In 2017, Sam watched his brother Dan win the AFL Grand Final as a 14 year old, and has had work experience at St Kilda and Richmond. Sam Butler played junior football for the Lake Wendouree Football Club and St Patricks College, Ballarat. At Lake Wendouree FC, (according to GameDay) he kicked 46 (documented) goals. He then played for the Greater Western Victoria Rebels in the NAB League, where he made a name for himself to be a 'clean and clever utility who can play through the midfield or up forward'. In the NAB League, he was ranked first out of all mid-forwards for tackles, contested possessions, and goals. At the Vic Country Draft Combine, he put AFL clubs on notice when he recorded the quickest 20m sprint time (2.97 seconds) and came second in the running (87 cm) and standing (71 cm) vertical jump. At 18 years of age, Sam Butler was expected to be drafted by Richmond (pick 15), Fremantle (pick 19), Geelong (pick 22), or Carlton (pick 25). However, he was drafted by Hawthorn with pick 23 in the 2021 NAB AFL draft.

== AFL career ==
Before making his AFL debut, Butler played 5 matches for the Box Hill Hawks at VFL level. During those games, he kicked 5 goals and 3 behinds, averaged 11.6 disposals, and scored 269 fantasy points, with an average of 53.8. While Butler was playing during that period, the Hawks won 3 out of 5 games. After earning his spot in the side due to a strong performance in the VFL against Essendon, he was called up to AFL level. He made his debut in round 9 against Richmond FC at the Melbourne Cricket Ground, where he could not impact the scoreboard, after being denied a goal by an immense defensive effort from fellow debutant Bigoa Nyuon. However, Sam was able to retain his place in the side for round 10, where Hawthorn played the Brisbane Lions in Launceston. Sam was beneficial to a Hawks victory, scoring 2 goals and more than doubling his fantasy score.

Butler was traded to Gold Coast alongside teammate Aidan Schubert following the 2026 AFL season.

== Statistics ==
Updated to the end of 2026.

Legend
G	Goals	K	Kicks	D	Disposals	T	Tackles
B	Behinds	H	Handballs	M	Marks

Season	Team	No.	Games	Totals							Averages (per game)							Votes
Season	Team	No.	Games	G	B	K	H	D	M	T	G	B	K	H	D	M	T	Votes
2022	Hawthorn	30	9	6	5	42	34	76	16	15	0.7	0.6	4.7	3.8	8.4	1.8	1.7	0
2023	Hawthorn	30	8	6	2	34	49	83	22	18	0.8	0.3	4.3	6.1	10.4	2.8	2.3	0
2024	Hawthorn	30	2	0	0	7	3	10	6	3	0.0	0.0	3.5	1.5	5.0	3.0	1.5	0
2025	Hawthorn	30	6	3	2	39	32	71	13	31	0.5	0.3	6.5	5.3	11.8	2.2	5.2	0
2026	Hawthorn	30	8	4	4	66	31	97	27	28	0.5	0.5	8.3	3.9	12.1	3.4	3.5	0
Career			33	19	13	188	149	337	84	95	0.6	0.4	5.7	4.5	10.2	2.5	2.9	0

== Honours and achievements ==
Team

- McClelland Trophy (Hawthorn): 2024
