= Mabior Chol =

Australian rules footballer (born 1997)

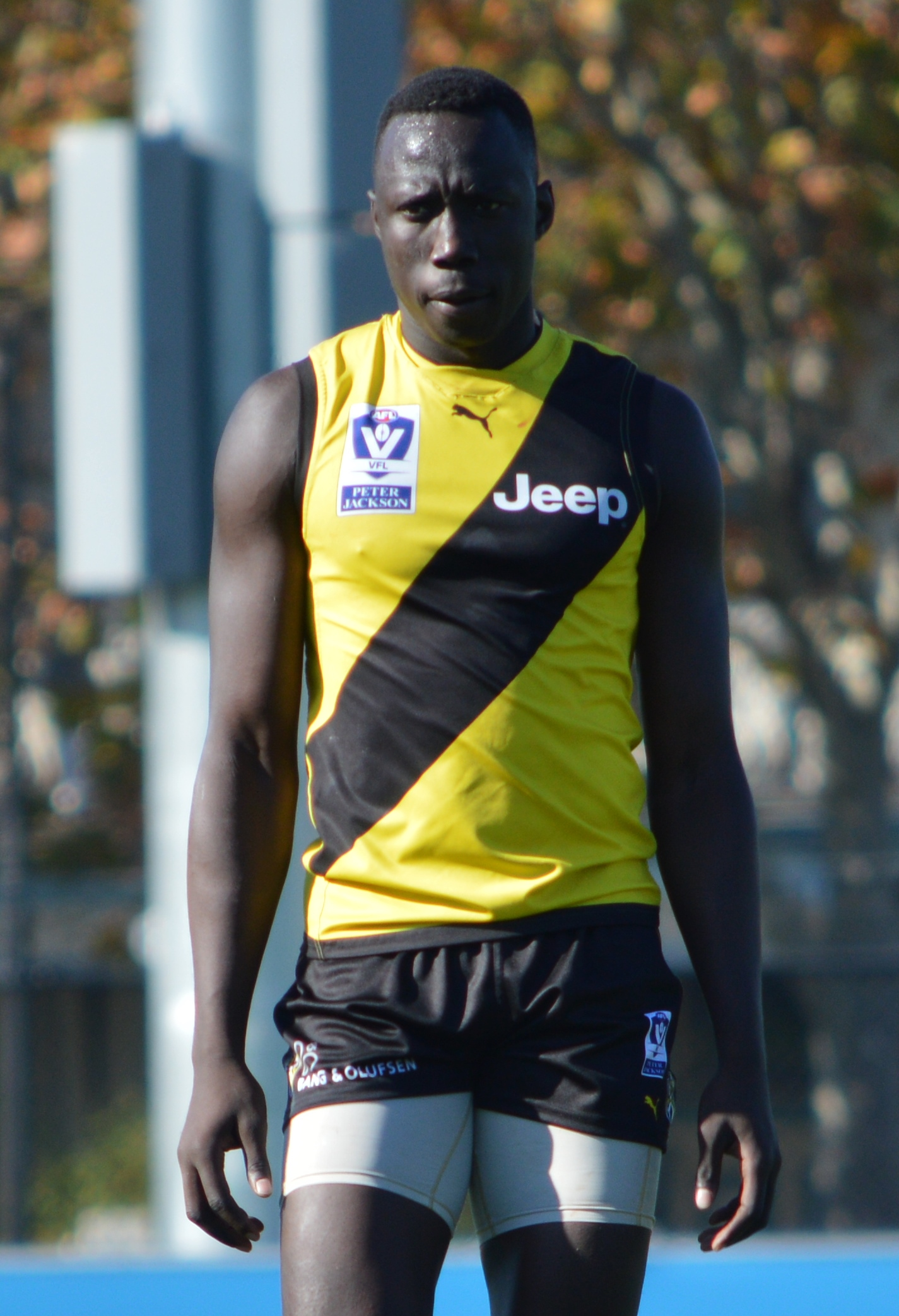
- Chol with Richmond's VFL team in May 2018

Personal information
- Nicknames: Linguine Arms, The Chols Royce, Marbs, Mabsy, Two Phones
- Born: 29 January 1997 (age 29); Sudan
- Original team: Yeronga (Qld)/Aspley (NEAFL)
- Draft: No. 30, 2016 rookie draft No. 45, 2019 rookie draft
- Debut: Round 23, 2016, Richmond vs. Sydney, at SCG
- Height: 200 cm (6 ft 7 in)
- Weight: 100.7 kg (222 lb)
- Position: Key forward / ruckman

Club information
- Current club: Hawthorn
- Number: 18

Playing career^{1}
Years	Club	Games (Goals)
2016–2021	Richmond	31 (24)
2022–2023	Gold Coast	30 (54)
2024–	Hawthorn	67 (110)
Total		128 (188)
- ^{1} Playing statistics correct to the end of 2026.

Career highlights
- Gold Coast leading goalkicker: 2022; Hawthorn leading goalkicker: 2024; 2× VFL premiership player: 2019, 2023

Mabior Chol (born 29 January 1997) is a professional Australian rules footballer who plays for the Hawthorn Football Club in the Australian Football League (AFL). He previously played for the Richmond Football Club and the Gold Coast Suns. He was drafted by Richmond in the 2016 rookie draft and made his debut in round 23, 2016. Chol was delisted by the club in 2018 before being immediately re-rookied in the 2019 rookie draft. In 2019, Chol won a VFL premiership while playing with the Richmond reserves side. In October 2021, Chol moved from Richmond to the Gold Coast Suns as a free agent. While playing in the Gold Coast Suns reserves side, he won his second VFL premiership in 2023. At the end of the 2023 season, Chol requested a trade away from Gold Coast to Hawthorn; the deal was struck on the final day of the 2023 AFL trade period.

As of May 2026, Chol has the most goals scored by an AFL player of South Sudanese descent.

== Early life and junior football ==
Chol was born in present-day South Sudan, before his family fled to Egypt to avoid the ongoing civil war when he was two years old. They moved to Australia in 2005 when Chol was eight years of age, settling in the Brisbane suburb of Acacia Ridge.

After playing soccer and basketball at a younger age, Chol took up Australian rules football when he joined the Yeronga State High School team at age 12. After playing in the state school final at The Gabba, he committed to playing the game at junior level the next year and joined the Yeronga South Brisbane Devils.

In 2013, Chol played for the World 18 team at the national under-16 championships. He later entered the junior Queensland development pathway and the Brisbane Lions Academy where he would play in 2014 and 2015. Chol also played for Aspley and the Lions' reserve team in the NEAFL in addition to the Lions' under-18 team. In 2015, he played with the Allies in an under-18 match as a curtain raiser to the year's AFL Grand Final.

Chol was a strong performer in the 2015 AFL draft combine, recording the number-one standing vertical jump score (334 cm), as well as placing second in the running vertical jump test (357 cm) and fourth in the relative running vertical jump test (409 cm). He also came second to future teammate Daniel Rioli in the 30-metre repeat sprint test (24.3 seconds). Prior to the draft he was also lauded by Queensland academy coach Adrian Fletcher for his positional versatility and his marking prowess.

== AFL career ==
=== 2016 season ===
Chol was drafted by Richmond with the club's second selection and 30th selection overall in the 2016 rookie draft.

He first represented Richmond in the club's 2016 pre-season match against Fremantle. He failed to gain selection at senior level as a result, though, instead playing a majority of his season with the club's reserves side in the VFL. There he played in a myriad of roles, including as a key defender, key forward and as a ruck. He eventually made his AFL debut in Richmond's last match of the season, in round 23 against Sydney at the Sydney Cricket Ground. Chol thereby became the fourth player of Sudanese descent (after Majak Daw, Aliir Aliir and Reuben William) to play senior AFL football.

=== 2017 season ===
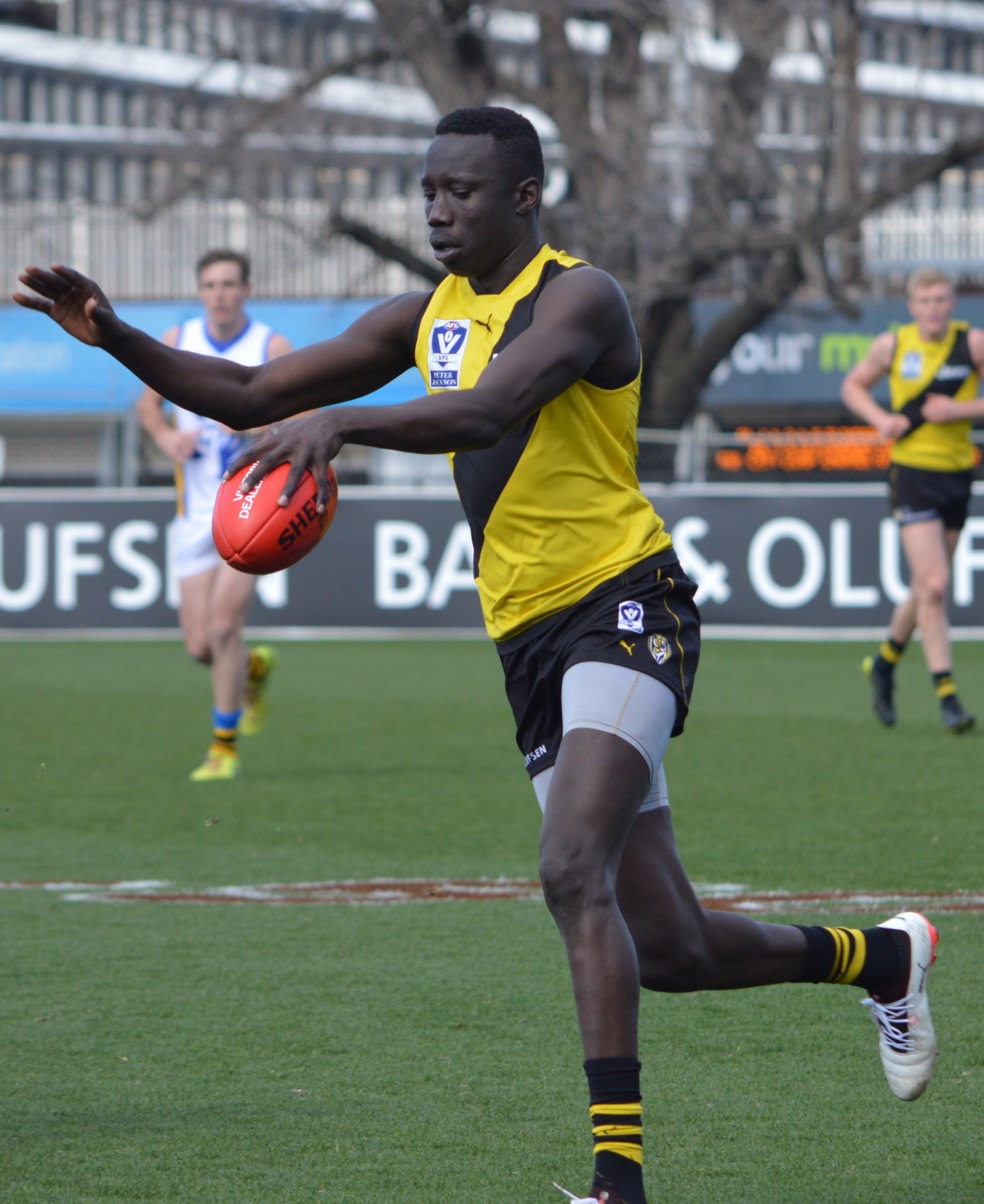
Chol kicks during play in a VFL match in August 2017

Over the 2017 pre-season, Chol focused on developing his body, looking to add muscle weight and to improve his endurance running. Injuries to key forwards early in the season saw Chol in contention for a senior call-up, but coach Damien Hardwick told the media he was hesitant to play the "inexperienced" Chol. In late July Chol was involved in a training mishap, accidentally poking forward Jack Riewoldt in the eye and causing him to miss two matches as a result. By season's end Chol had failed to play senior football that year. He did however contribute in the reserves, kicking 13 goals over 22 matches including in the team's losing grand final.

=== 2018 season ===
Chol played his first football of 2018 in February, travelling to Sydney to play in Richmond's AFLX squad for that year's exhibition series. In the pre-season tournament he played in one match and kicked one goal, playing a majority of the game as Richmond's lead ruck after Toby Nankervis suffered concussion early in that match. His performance earned the praise of Seven Network commentator Tim Watson, who predicted he would be playing AFL level football for Richmond by season's end. While he did not earn immediate selection, he would be named as an emergency for the first time in round 3. In early June, Chol suffered a fracture in the fifth metatarsal of his foot while landing from a mark in training. The surgery and resulting recovery was expected to see him in a stabilising moon boot for three weeks and sideline him from matches for eight to ten weeks. By early-July he had resumed walking free of the boot and by late August he was approaching the final stages of aerobic conditioning prior to a footballing return. Chol eventually made his return to VFL football in Richmond's semi-final loss to Essendon, which brought to an end his and the club's reserves season after playing eight matches and kicking 11 goals. He had failed to earn a senior match that year and the club subsequently delisted him at the end of the season. As part of the announcement, club officials said they would consider their options in regards to Chol, while The Age reported that Chol would be reselected by Richmond in the coming rookie draft should he fail to be recruited by another club in the interim. These reports proved correct when Chol was re-drafted to Richmond with the 45th pick in the 2019 rookie draft.

=== 2019 season ===
A fully fit Chol completed a full pre-season training schedule before beginning the 2019 season with the club's reserves side in the VFL, including serving as stand-in captain in a pre-season match against Box Hill in March. He kicked five goals across the opening two rounds of the VFL season despite being switched through roles as a key forward, ruck and key back in those matches. Chol kicked a further seven goals over three VFL matches in May, before moving into a ruck role as injuries and suspension to the club's AFL rucks tested depth in that area at VFL level. He was best on ground in the VFL Dreamtime game in late May in that role, recording 23 disposals, 12 clearances, 22 hit outs and a goal in what coach Craig McRae called his best game in four seasons at the club. After being named an AFL emergency but going unselected in the final team in round 12, Chol was named as emergency but eventually called up to play when ruck Ivan Soldo was ruled out with illness in round 13. He kicked his first AFL goal in that match while also recording 13 hitouts and eight disposals in a ruck role shared with young teammate Noah Balta. Chol remained in the senior side following the mid-season bye and the return of Soldo in round 16, performing exceptionally in a forward role in which he kicked three goals and recorded 16 disposals and nine marks. As a result, he received five votes in the AFL Coaches Association player of the year award and one Brownlow Medal vote as third best player on the field. Chol kicked a goal in each his next five matches at AFL level, continuing to impact as a forward and relief ruck despite averaging a modest eight disposals per game. After nine straight matches at AFL level but going goalless and posting a total of eight disposals across rounds 21 and 22, Chol was dropped back to VFL level. His first match back was in a come-from-behind qualifying final win over the Essendon reserves in which he posted 13 hitouts and kicked two goals. He was named as an emergency in the club's first AFL final the following weekend, before kicking another two goals in the VFL preliminary final as Richmond's reserves won through to that league's grand final. Chol was an emergency again in the AFL preliminary final one week later, but was again unselected for the final team. Instead, he formed part of the Richmond VFL side that defeated Williamstown as the club won its first reserves grade premiership since 1997. Chol finished 2019 having played a career-best nine matches at AFL level and was Richmond's equal-leading goalkicker in the reserves, with 21 goals across 12 games including that year's VFL premiership.

=== 2020 season ===
Chol played his first match for 2020 in the opening round of the AFL pre-season series, but was dropped back to reserves level for the second and final match following the return of the club's premier tall forwards, Jack Riewoldt and Tom Lynch, from State of Origin duties. Instead, he participated in a VFL practice match in the first week of March, which was to be his final competitive match in many months as the following week's reserves match was cancelled due to safety concerns as a result of the rapid progression of the COVID-19 pandemic into Australia. Though the AFL season would start on schedule later that month, just one round of matches was played of the reduced 17-round season before the imposition of state border restrictions saw the season suspended for an indefinite period. When the season resumed after an 11-week hiatus, Chol played in an unofficial scratch match against Collingwood's reserves due to AFL clubs' withdrawal from the VFL season. After two more scratch matches at reserves level including a five-goal haul against St Kilda's reserves, Chol was selected for an AFL recall in the club's round 5 win over Melbourne. He continued to earn AFL selection over coming weeks, including after the club was relocated to the Gold Coast in response to a virus outbreak in Melbourne. Chol kicked two goals against North Melbourne in round 7 and added another in round 9's win over the Western Bulldogs. He featured in each of the club's next four matches, including with two goals against Port Adelaide in round 12 and a goal in round 13's Dreamtime in Darwin win over Essendon. He was omitted from the club's round 14 side however, overlooked in place of returning ruck Toby Nankervis. Chol spent three rounds out of the side before earning an AFL recall following a five goal showing in a mid-September practice match against the Geelong reserves. He played a dual role as ruck and forward in the round 18 win over Adelaide, filling roles left by injured duo Ivan Soldo and Tom Lynch. Chol held his spot and played his first finals match in the first week of October, contributing seven disposals and nine hit-outs in a qualifying final loss to the Brisbane Lions. It was to be his last match of the season however, with Lynch returning from injury for the club's semi-final and Chol relegated to emergency status for each of the three remaining finals in the club's premiership run. He finished the season having played 11 of a possible 21 matches, kicking a total of eight goals.

=== 2021 season ===
After taking part in the club's pre-season matches as part of an extended team line-up, Chol began the season proper with Richmond's reserves side in the VFL. He was named a non-playing AFL emergency on several occasions over the opening two and a half months of the season, as the primary backup to lead ruck Toby Nankervis in the wake of a long-term knee injury to other senior ruck Ivan Soldo.

=== 2022 season ===
At the conclusion of the 2021 AFL season, Chol exercised his rights as a free agent and moved to the Gold Coast Suns. In round 1, against the West Coast Eagles at Optus Stadium Chol kicked 2 goals, within a game that the Suns won, including a Goal of The Year nomination. In Round 20 Chol played his 50th game. He kicked 5 goals in their 3 point win against West Coast at Metricon Stadium. Chol finished the 2022 AFL season after playing 22 games and kicking 44 goals therefore awarding him Gold Coast's leading goalkicker of the season.

=== 2023 season ===
Chol played his first game of the year in their Round 1 clash against Sydney. Chol wasn’t that effective, however, causing him to miss the next three games after being dropped from the senior team. Chol returned to the line-up in Round 5. He had more action than against Sydney but still was only effective by kicking a solitary goal in their disappointing 10-point loss to Fremantle. Despite this, Chol kept his spot in the senior team for their Anzac Round game against North Melbourne at Heritage Bank Stadium. He played much better, kicking 2 goals and having 13 disposals in a 43-point win. For the rest of the season, Chol was in out of the senior team facing competition with fellow talls Ben King, Levi Casboult, and Jack Lukosius. Chol played 8 games in the senior team in 2023, kicking 10 goals in total. Chol also took part in playing in Gold Coast's VFL premiership win.

Following the 2023 AFL season, Chol requested a trade to Hawthorn. He was traded on the final day of trade period.

== Player profile ==
Chol plays as a tall forward and relief ruck. He is notable for his athletic traits, including ground-level agility and a powerful vertical leap.

== Statistics ==
Updated to the end of 2026.

Legend
G	Goals	K	Kicks	D	Disposals	T	Tackles
B	Behinds	H	Handballs	M	Marks	H/O	Hit-outs

Season	Team	No.	Games	Totals							Averages (per game)							Votes
Season	Team	No.	Games	G	B	K	H	D	M	T	G	B	K	H	D	M	T	Votes
2016	Richmond	41	1	0	1	2	0	2	1	1	0.0	1.0	2.0	0.0	2.0	1.0	1.0	0
2019	Richmond	41	9	9	5	49	23	72	22	28	1.0	0.6	5.4	2.6	8.0	2.4	3.1	1
2020 (Note: The 2020 season was played with 17 home-and-away matches per team (down from 22) and 16-minute quarters with time on (down from 20-minute quarters with time on) due to the impact of the COVID-19 pandemic.)	Richmond	41	11	8	3	39	27	66	15	17	0.7	0.3	3.5	2.5	6.0	1.4	1.5	0
2021	Richmond	41	10	7	4	59	41	100	31	25	0.7	0.4	5.9	4.1	10.0	3.1	2.5	1
2022	Gold Coast	1	22	44	27	142	43	185	80	28	2.0	1.2	6.5	2.0	8.4	3.6	1.3	3
2023	Gold Coast	1	8	10	7	49	12	61	28	14	1.3	0.9	6.1	1.5	7.6	3.5	1.8	0
2024	Hawthorn	18	23	37	21	168	46	214	85	62	1.6	0.9	7.3	2.0	9.3	3.7	2.7	0
2025	Hawthorn	18	24	42	18	171	69	240	94	64	1.8	0.8	7.1	2.9	10.0	3.9	2.7	1
2026	Hawthorn	18	20	31	21	142	47	189	81	45	1.6	1.1	7.1	2.4	9.5	4.1	2.3	0
Career			128	188	107	821	308	1129	437	284	1.5	0.8	6.4	2.4	8.8	3.4	2.2	6

== Honours and achievements ==
Team

- McClelland Trophy (Hawthorn): 2024
- VFL premiership player (Richmond): 2019
- VFL premiership player (Gold Coast): 2023
- 2× VFL minor premiership (Richmond): 2018, 2019
- VFL minor premiership (Gold Coast): 2023

=== Individual ===
- Gold Coast leading goalkicker: 2022
- Hawthorn leading goalkicker: 2024

== Personal life ==
In 2019 Chol began dying a strip of his black hair blond, resembling the Richmond guernsey design. However, once he moved over to the Gold Coast Suns, he shaved his head bald to resemble his idol Gary Ablett junior.

Chol is an ambassador for The Growth Project, an organisation dedicated to fostering community engagement for young Melburnians of Sudanese heritage.
