= Cameron Mackenzie (footballer) =

Australian rules footballer (born 2004)

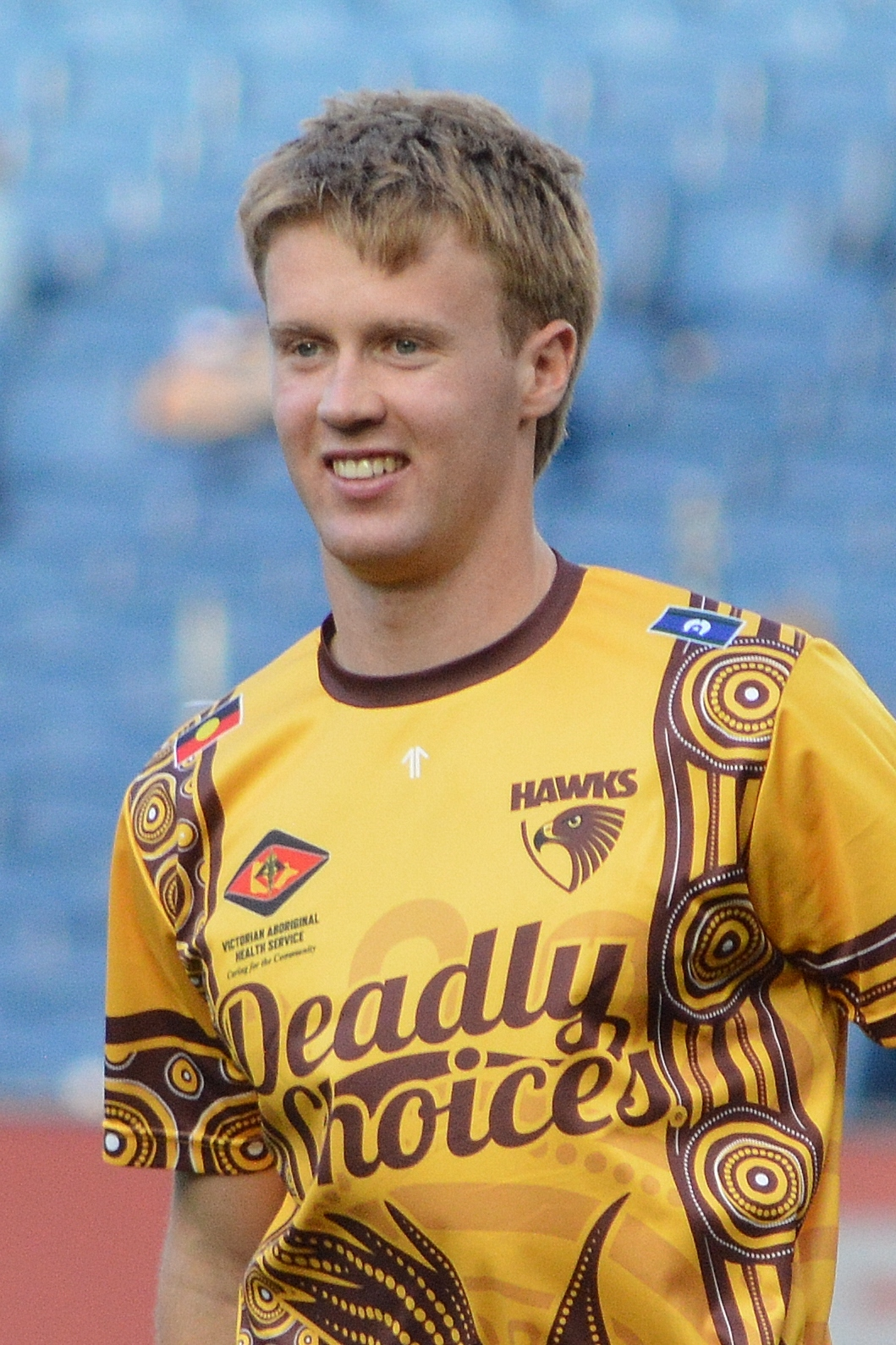
- Mackenzie in May 2026

Personal information
- Full name: Cameron Mackenzie
- Born: 21 January 2004 (age 22); London, England
- Original team: Sandringham Dragons (NAB League)/Brighton Grammar (APS)/Beaumaris
- Draft: No. 7, 2022 AFL draft, Hawthorn
- Debut: Round 1, 2023, Hawthorn vs. Essendon, at MCG
- Height: 188 cm (6 ft 2 in)
- Weight: 83 kg (183 lb)
- Position: Midfielder

Club information
- Current club: Hawthorn
- Number: 28

Playing career^{1}
Years	Club	Games (Goals)
2023–	Hawthorn	69 (16)
- ^{1} Playing statistics correct to the end of 2026.

Cameron Mackenzie (born 21 January 2004) is an Australian rules footballer who plays for Hawthorn in the Australian Football League (AFL).

== Early career ==
Born in London to South African parents who were open to experiencing life in different places around the world. His mum was born in Canada but is of South African background. His family moved to Australia when he was one. When he was twelve the family spent a year in the south of France. He learned to speak French fluently and when he returned to Australia he acquired the nickname Frenchie. Cameron's father was born in South Africa, meaning Mackenzie was eligible to join the St Kilda Next Generation Academy. However, a change to draft rules meant that St Kilda could not match a bid before pick 40.

== AFL career ==
He was the seventh selection in the 2022 AFL draft by Hawthorn. He has been described as a reliable and well-rounded player with a measured temperament.

Mackenzie made his debut against Essendon at the MCG in the opening round of the 2023 AFL season.

Mackenzie injured his hamstring at training on the 4th of September, 2024, missing the subsequent Elimination Final, and his first, against the Western Bulldogs on the 6th of September, 2024.

== Statistics ==
Updated to the end of 2026.

Legend
G	Goals	K	Kicks	D	Disposals	T	Tackles
B	Behinds	H	Handballs	M	Marks

Season	Team	No.	Games	Totals							Averages (per game)							Votes
Season	Team	No.	Games	G	B	K	H	D	M	T	G	B	K	H	D	M	T	Votes
2023	Hawthorn	28	14	3	6	86	100	186	26	37	0.2	0.4	6.1	7.1	13.3	1.9	2.6	0
2024	Hawthorn	28	20	9	5	162	138	300	53	50	0.5	0.3	8.1	6.9	15.0	2.7	2.5	0
2025	Hawthorn	28	12	0	1	100	98	198	24	50	0.0	0.1	8.3	8.2	16.5	2.0	4.2	3
2026	Hawthorn	28	23	4	8	236	225	461	51	94	0.2	0.4	10.3	9.8	20.0	2.2	4.1	0
Career			69	16	20	584	561	1145	154	231	0.2	0.3	8.5	8.1	16.6	2.2	3.4	3

== Honours and achievements ==
Team

- McClelland Trophy (Hawthorn): 2024
