= Noah Mraz =

Australian rules footballer (born 2006)

- Mraz playing for Box Hill in 2026

Personal information
- Born: 20 February 2006 (age 20)
- Original team: Dandenong Ranges
- Draft: No. 35, 2024 national draft
- Debut: Round 17, 2026, Hawthorn vs. Melbourne, at University of Tasmania Stadium
- Height: 198 cm (6 ft 6 in)
- Position: Defender

Club information
- Current club: Hawthorn
- Number: 21

Playing career^{1}
Years	Club	Games (Goals)
2026–	Hawthorn	4 (1)
- ^{1} Playing statistics correct to the end of 2026.

Career highlights
- VFL premiership player: 2026

Noah Mraz (born 20 February 2006) is a professional Australian rules footballer playing for the Hawthorn Football Club in the Australian Football League (AFL).

== AFL career ==
Mraz was selected by Hawthorn with the 35th pick of the 2024 national draft. Mraz would eventually make his debut in round 17, 2026 against Melbourne at University of Tasmania Stadium. Mraz impressed finishing the game with 16 disposals and 12 marks. Mraz would play 3 more games before suffering a kidney injury. Mraz didn't play another game at AFL level in 2026 following his injury, though he did feature for Hawthorn's VFL-affiliated side, the Box Hill Hawks, when they won the 2026 VFL premiership against Geelong.

== Statistics ==
Updated to the end of 2026.

Legend
G	Goals	K	Kicks	D	Disposals	T	Tackles
B	Behinds	H	Handballs	M	Marks

Season	Team	No.	Games	Totals							Averages (per game)							Votes
Season	Team	No.	Games	G	B	K	H	D	M	T	G	B	K	H	D	M	T	Votes
2026	Hawthorn	21	4	1	2	43	17	60	21	12	0.3	0.5	10.8	4.3	15.0	5.3	3.0	0
Career			4	1	2	43	17	60	21	12	0.3	0.5	10.8	4.3	15.0	5.3	3.0	0

== Honours and achievements ==
Team

- VFL premiership player (Box Hill): 2026
