= Will McCabe =

Australian rules footballer (born 2005)

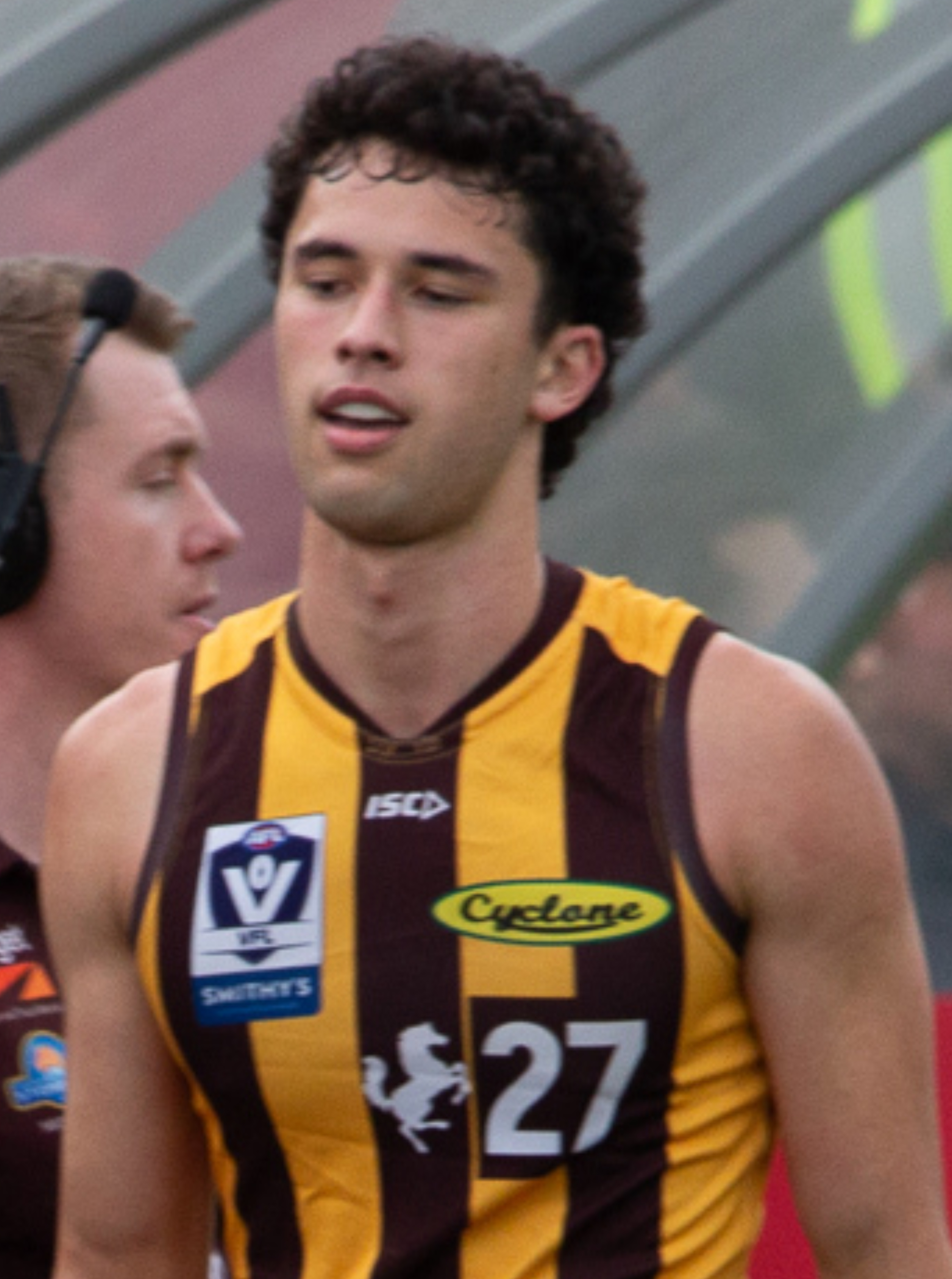
- McCabe in September 2025

Personal information
- Full name: William McCabe
- Born: 29 September 2005 (age 21)
- Draft: No. 19 (F/S), 2023 AFL draft
- Debut: Round 6, 2026, Hawthorn vs. Port Adelaide, at Marvel Stadium
- Height: 197 cm (6 ft 6 in)
- Position: Key Forward

Club information
- Current club: Hawthorn
- Number: 27

Playing career^{1}
Years	Club	Games (Goals)
2026–	Hawthorn	4 (2)
- ^{1} Playing statistics correct to the end of 2026.

Career highlights
- VFL premiership player: 2026

William McCabe (born 29 September 2005) is a professional Australian rules footballer who plays for the Hawthorn Football Club in the Australian Football League (AFL).

== AFL career ==
McCabe was drafted by the Hawthorn Football Club with pick 19 in the 2023 AFL draft under the Father–son rule when they matched a bid from North Melbourne. His first season was hampered by a lower back complaint which he needed to recover from. Playing for the Box Hill Hawks , McCabe was given to play in a variety of positions. Sometimes forward, sometimes back and often of the wing.

McCabe would eventually make his debut in round 6 of the 2026 AFL season. McCabe would have 6 disposals and kick his first goal in a 3-point victory over Port Adelaide. McCabe would go on to play for four times at AFL level in 2026, while also winning a premiership for Hawthorn's VFL-affiliated side, the Box Hill Hawks.

== Statistics ==
Updated to the end of 2026.

Legend
G	Goals	K	Kicks	D	Disposals	T	Tackles
B	Behinds	H	Handballs	M	Marks

Season	Team	No.	Games	Totals							Averages (per game)							Votes
Season	Team	No.	Games	G	B	K	H	D	M	T	G	B	K	H	D	M	T	Votes
2026	Hawthorn	27	4	2	2	23	12	35	14	4	0.5	0.5	5.8	3.0	8.8	3.5	1.0	0
Career			4	2	2	23	12	35	14	4	0.5	0.5	5.8	3.0	8.8	3.5	1.0	0

== Honours and achievements ==
Team

- VFL premiership player (Box Hill): 2026
