= Brodie McLaughlin =

Australian rules footballer (born 1997)

- McLaughlin with Box Hill in 2026

Personal information
- Born: 20 November 1997 (age 28)
- Original teams: Balwyn (YJFL); Boroondara Hawks (YJFL)
- Height: 193 cm (6 ft 4 in)
- Weight: 85 kg (187 lb)

Playing career
Years	Club	Games (Goals)
2019	North Melbourne (VFL)	6 (4)
2021–2022	Frankston	18 (34)
2023	Gold Coast (VFL)	20 (55)
2024–2025	Williamstown	38 (66)
2026	Box Hill	20 (51)
Total		102 (210)

Representative team honours
Years	Team	Games (Goals)
2017	VAFA	4 (0)
2025	VFL	1 (4)

Career highlights
- 2x VFL premiership player: 2023, 2026; 2x Jim 'Frosty' Miller Medal: 2023, 2025; 2x VFL Team of the Year: 2023, 2025; 2x Mark Fotheringham Trophy: 2024, 2025; Paul Bolton Trophy: 2026; Frankston leading goalkicker: 2022; Bulleen Templestowe best-and-fairest: 2017; VAFA Division 2 Team of the Year: 2016

Brodie McLaughlin (born 20 November 1997) is an Australian rules footballer who plays for Montrose in the Eastern Football Netball League (EFNL). He is a two-time premiership player with the Gold Coast Suns and the Box Hill Hawks in the Victorian Football League (VFL), in addition to winning the Jim 'Frosty' Miller Medal as the competition's leading goalkicker twice.

McLaughlin began his VFL career with North Melbourne's reserves team in 2019, before moving to Frankston for the 2021 season. At the start of 2023, he joined the Gold Coast Suns in the Australian Football League (AFL) but never played an AFL match, although he was part of the club's inaugural VFL premiership and was a joint winner of the Frosty Miller Medal. He joined Williamstown in 2024 and won a second Frosty Miller Medal in 2025, then moved to Box Hill in 2026 and played in a second VFL premiership.

== Career ==
McLaughlin played for Balwyn and the Boroondara Hawks in the Yarra Junior Football League (YJFL). After being overlooked by TAC Cup teams, McLaughlin did not play any football in 2015 and focused on his Year 12 studies.

In 2016, McLaughlin joined the Bulleen Templestowe Football Club in the Victorian Amateur Football Association (VAFA), which was competing in the VAFA's fifth tier (Division 2) at the time. He finished fourth in the J Fullerton Medal (Division 2 best-and-fairest) count with thirteen votes and was named in the back pocket in the Division 2 Team of the Year. In 2017, McLaughin was again Bulleen Templestowe's leading vote-getter in the J Fullerton Medal count and won the club's best-and-fairest award. He was part of the VAFA's representative team at the end of the season, which saw him play international rules football during a three-match tour of Ireland. The VAFA also travelled to England to play an Australian rules football match against AFL Europe in Reading, where McLaughlin was named among the best players.

After twenty goals in 33 matches with Bulleen Templestowe, McLaughlin joined the De La Salle Football Club in the VAFA's top tier (Premier Division) for the 2018 season. While still playing for De La Salle, he was signed by North Melbourne's reserves team in the Victorian Football League (VFL) in 2019, playing six matches and kicking four goals during the season. McLaughlin did not play any football matches in 2020 due to the impact of the COVID-19 pandemic. He moved to the Frankston Football Club for the 2021 VFL season and nominated for the AFL mid-season rookie draft, but was not selected by an Australian Football League (AFL) club. McLaughlin was Frankston's leading goalkicker in 2022, when he kicked 24 goals in twelve matches. He kicked 56 goals in 31 matches during his four seasons at De La Salle.

In December 2022, McLaughlin was invited by the Gold Coast Suns to train with the club in the 2023 AFL preseason. While on a training camp on the Sunshine Coast in February 2023, it was announced that McLaughlin would join Gold Coast through the supplemental selection period (SSP), claiming the final spot on the club's rookie list ahead of Boyd Woodcock and Brinn Little. He made his debut for Gold Coast's reserves team in round 1 of the 2023 VFL season, kicking two goals against Williamstown at Austworld Centre Oval. During the season, he was goalless in only one match (round 9 against Werribee) and kicked five or more goals on four occasions. McLaughlin kicked 51 goals during the home-and-away season to jointly win the Jim 'Frosty' Miller Medal as the VFL's leading goalkicker, sharing the medal with Suns teammate Chris Burgess and earning a place in the Team of the Year. He kicked three goals in the 2023 grand final against Werribee, which Gold Coast won by nineteen points to claim its inaugural premiership at any level of football.

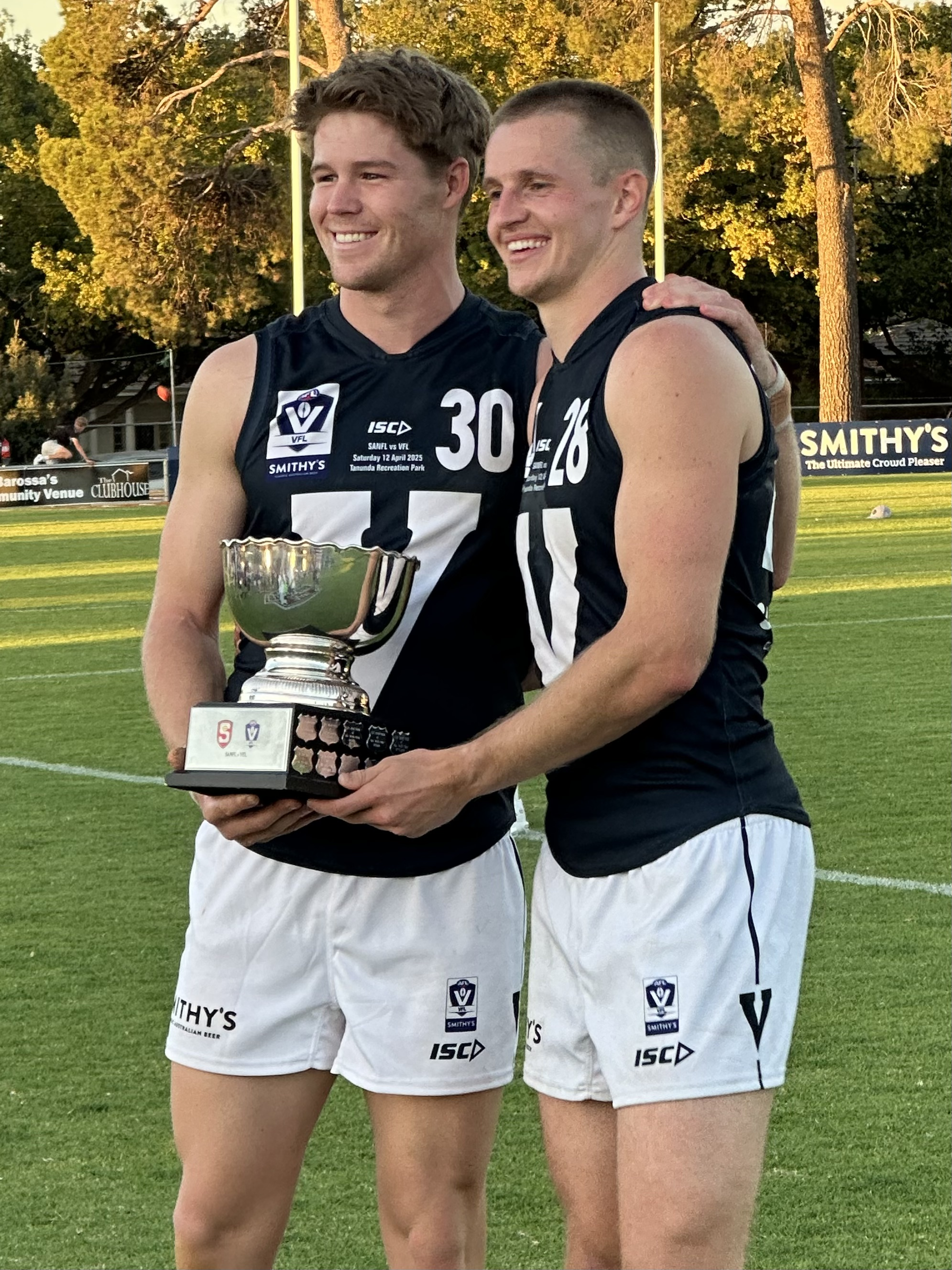
McLaughlin (right) poses with Corey Ellison following the VFL's win over the SANFL in April 2025

On 4 October 2023, McLaughlin was delisted by Gold Coast, having not played an AFL match. Two months later, he was signed by the Williamstown Football Club in the VFL. McLaughlin led the club's goalkicking to win the Mark Fotheringham Trophy with 49 goals for the season, including six goals in a seventeen-point semi-final loss to Brisbane, which saw him finish equal-third in the club's best-and-fairest count. He was elevated to Williamstown's leadership group for the 2025 season and represented the VFL in an interstate match against the South Australian National Football League (SANFL) in April 2025, kicking four goals in an eleven-point win at Tanunda Recreation Park. McLaughlin kicked a career-high seven goals against Carlton in round 9 and Sandringham in round 14 to reach a total of 67 goals for the home-and-away season, which saw him claim the Frosty Miller Medal for a second time and become the second player in history to win the award at two different clubs. He won the Mark Fotheringham Trophy for a second year in a row with 71 goals (including four in the finals series) and was named at full-forward in the VFL Team of the Year.

At the conclusion of the 2025 season, McLaughlin left Williamstown after 38 matches for the club; he later said he was prepared to retire from the VFL at the time. The Hawthorn Football Club contacted McLaughlin to offer him a train-on spot during the AFL preseason, with the possibility of him joining the club through the supplemental selection period (SSP). However, he broke his foot during a training session at the Kennedy Community Centre and was ultimately not added to Hawthorn's list. Although McLaughlin signed with Montrose in the Eastern Football Netball League (EFNL) in February 2026, he also joined Hawthorn's reserves affiliate – the Box Hill Hawks – in the VFL. He was named in the VFL's representative team against the SANFL in April 2026, but was a late out due to injury. McLaughlin nominated for the AFL mid-season rookie draft but was again overlooked, which saw him consider leaving Box Hill midway through the season. However, he remained at the Hawks for the rest of the year and was part of the club's premiership-winning team against Geelong. McLaughlin kicked a total of 51 goals during the 2026 VFL season, winning the Paul Bolton Trophy as Box Hill's leading goalkicker. He retired from the VFL at the end of the year to play for Montrose in the EFNL in 2027.

== Statistics ==
Legend
G	Goals	K	Kicks	D	Disposals	T	Tackles
B	Behinds	H	Handballs	M	Marks

Season	Team	No.	Games	Totals							Averages (per game)							Votes
Season	Team	No.	Games	G	B	K	H	D	M	T	G	B	K	H	D	M	T	Votes
2019	North Melbourne	74	6	4							0.7							0
2021	Frankston	28	6	10	8	41	27	68	25	11	1.7	1.3	6.8	4.5	11.3	4.2	1.8	— (Note: The J. J. Liston Trophy was not awarded in 2021 because the season was curtailed due to the impact of the COVID-19 pandemic.)
2022	Frankston	28	12	24	14	106	39	145	66	19	2.0	1.2	8.8	3.3	12.1	5.5	1.6	0
2023	Gold Coast	43	20	55	27	216	91	307	130	34	2.8	1.4	10.8	4.6	15.4	6.5	1.7	5
2024	Williamstown	6	18	49	22	136	51	187	83	21	2.7	1.2	7.6	2.8	10.4	4.6	1.2	3
2025	Williamstown	6	20	71	40	195	55	250	116	36	3.6	2.0	9.8	2.8	12.5	5.8	1.8	17
2026	Box Hill	50	20	51	30	144	45	189	88	18	2.6	1.5	7.2	2.3	9.5	4.4	0.9	4
Career			102	210							2.1							29
