= Dom Brew =

Australian rules footballer (born 1997)

- Brew playing for Werribee in 2024

Personal information
- Full name: Dominic Brew
- Born: 23 January 1997 (age 29)
- Height: 180 cm (5 ft 11 in)
- Weight: 89 kg (196 lb)

Club information
- Current club: Werribee
- Number: 29

Playing career^{1}
Years	Club	Games (Goals)
2017–	Werribee	147 (35)

Representative team honours
Years	Team	Games (Goals)
2024–2026	VFL	3 (2)
- ^{1} Playing statistics correct to the end of 2026.

Career highlights
- Werribee co-captain: 2022; VFL premiership player: 2024; J. J. Liston Trophy: 2024; VFL Coaches MVP Award: 2024; 3x VFL Team of the Year: 2023, 2024, 2025; 3x Bruce Montgomery Trophy: 2023, 2024, 2025; 2x Trademark Player of the Year: 2023, 2024; NTFL premiership player: 2020–21; Nichols Medal: 2020–21

Dominic Brew (born 23 January 1997) is an Australian rules footballer who currently plays for the Werribee Football Club in the Victorian Football League (VFL). Considered one of Werribee's greatest players of all time, Brew won the J. J. Liston Trophy in 2024 and is a three-time Team of the Year member.

Brew has won the Bruce Montgomery Trophy as Werribee's best-and-fairest player on three occasions and was awarded the Nichols Medal while playing for Nightcliff in the Northern Territory Football League (NTFL) during the 2020–21 season. He is the only player to have won both the J. J. Liston Trophy and the Nichols Medal as the best-and-fairest player in the VFL and the NTFL respectively.

As of 2026, Brew has played the second-most matches for Werribee in the history of the club, only behind Robbie Castello.

== Career ==
Brew made his debut for the Albury Football Club in the Ovens & Murray Football Netball League (OMFNL) in 2014, playing in the reserves and thirds competitions. He made his senior debut in 2015 and played three matches but was not selected in Albury's senior team that won the OMFNL grand final, instead playing for the reserves team in a preliminary final loss to Wodonga.

In 2016, Brew moved to the North Albury Football Club and played eighteen senior matches during the season. He played for AFL Victoria Country in an under-19s representative match against the Victorian Amateur Football Association (VAFA); while travelling to the match, he was involved in a serious car accident on the Hume Highway, but was uninjured. Brew played two VFL Development League matches as a top-up player during the 2016 season, first for the Werribee Football Club in round 17 and then for the Coburg Football Club in round 21, being named among the best players in both matches.

Werribee officially signed Brew to the club's Victorian Football League (VFL) playing list for the 2017 season. He played in the Development League until making his senior VFL debut for Werribee against the Northern Blues in round 9, recording twenty-two disposals and seven tackles in a 14-point victory. Brew remained at Werribee in 2018 and 2019 after the club returned to competing as a standalone team following the end of its reserves affiliation with North Melbourne.

During the VFL offseason, Brew played for the Nightcliff Football Club in the Northern Territory Football Club (NTFL) during the 2020–21 season. He represented the NTFL in a match against the Glenelg Football Club on 23 January 2021. Brew won the Nichols Medal as the NTFL's best-and-fairest men's player with 27 votes and played in Nightcliff's grand final victory over St Mary's.

On 10 March 2022, Brew was appointed Werribee co-captain, serving alongside Tom Gribble. He stepped down from the role before the start of the 2023 season but was appointed as a co-vice-captain with Shaun Mannagh. After playing all 21 VFL matches in 2023, including Werribee's grand final loss to Gold Coast, Brew was named in the VFL Team of the Year and won the Bruce Montgomery Trophy as Werribee's best-and-fairest player. In 2024, Brew had his best season to date, captaining the VFL in an interstate match against the South Australian National Football League (SANFL) and averaging 28.8 disposals during the home-and-away season. He won the J. J. Liston Trophy with 31 votes – the second-highest total under the 3–2–1 voting system – in addition to being named captain of the Team of the Year, winning the VFL Coaches MVP Award and claiming a second Bruce Montgomery Trophy. Because Nick Coughlan was injured, Brew served as Werribee's acting captain for the 2024 grand final, which the club won by six points to end a 31-year premiership drought; Brew was in tears during a post-match interview.

Following his successful VFL season, Brew was invited by the Western Bulldogs to train ahead of the 2025 AFL season, with the possibility of gaining a spot on the club's Australian Football League (AFL) list. He played for the Bulldogs in a preseason match simulation against Essendon, but was ultimately not chosen to join the club. Brew remained at Werribee for the 2025 VFL season, played in a second representative match against the SANFL and was named in the VFL Team of the Year. He won the Bruce Montgomery Trophy for a third consecutive season, becoming the third player in Werribee's history to achieve the feat (after Travis Robertson and Matt Hanson).

== Statistics ==
Updated to the end of 2026.

Legend
G	Goals	K	Kicks	D	Disposals	T	Tackles
B	Behinds	H	Handballs	M	Marks

Season	Team	No.	Games	Totals							Averages (per game)							Votes
Season	Team	No.	Games	G	B	K	H	D	M	T	G	B	K	H	D	M	T	Votes
2017	Werribee	29	9	1							0.1							
2018	Werribee	29	14	2							0.1							0
2019	Werribee	29	20	9							0.4							6
2021	Werribee	29	9	3	0	90	74	164	11	93	0.3	0.0	10.0	8.2	18.2	1.2	10.3	— (Note: The J. J. Liston Trophy was not awarded in 2021 because the season was curtailed due to the impact of the COVID-19 pandemic.)
2022	Werribee	29	17	2	4	184	157	341	36	168	0.1	0.2	10.8	9.2	20.1	2.1	9.9	0
2023	Werribee	29	21	5	7	329	195	524	53	208	0.2	0.3	15.7	9.3	25.0	2.5	9.9	13
2024	Werribee	29	21	3	6	388	212	600	67	201	0.1	0.3	18.5	10.1	28.6	3.2	9.6	31
2025	Werribee	29	18	5	2	282	238	520	64	170	0.3	0.1	15.7	13.2	28.9	3.6	9.4	21
2026	Werribee	29	18	4	7	227	185	412	35	157	0.2	0.4	12.6	10.3	22.9	1.9	8.7	7
Career			147	35							0.2							
