= 2023 VFL season =

141st season of the Victorian Football League

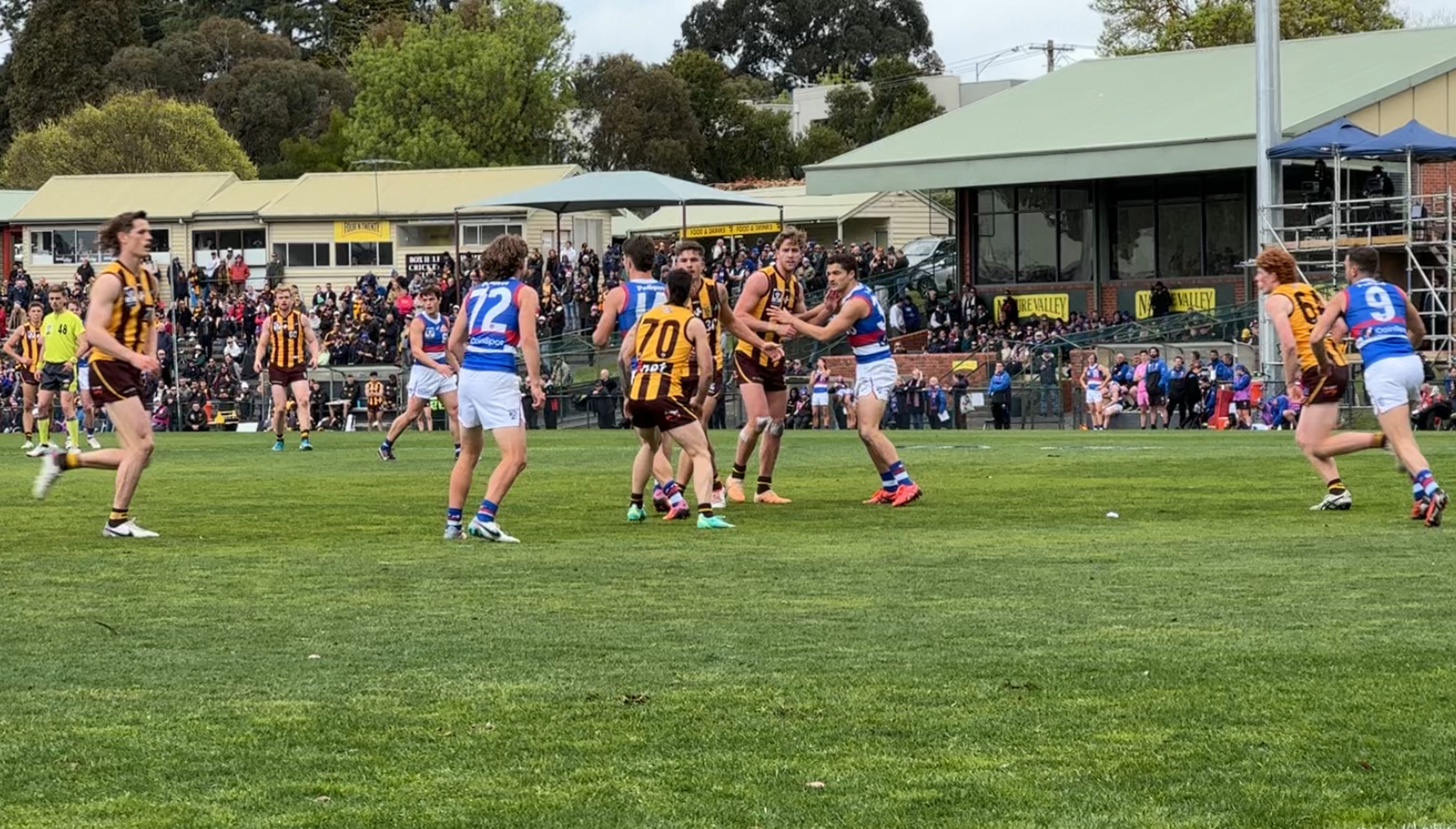
- Box Hill plays Footscray during the finals series
- Date: 24 March – 24 September 2023
- Teams: 21
- Premiers: Gold Coast reserves 1st premiership
- Minor premiers: Gold Coast reserves 1st minor premiership
- J. J. Liston Trophy: Jarryd Lyons (Brisbane – 26 votes)
- Frosty Miller Medallist: Chris Burgess (Gold Coast – 51 goals); Brodie McLaughlin (Gold Coast – 51 goals)

The 2023 VFL season was the 141st season of the Victorian Football League (VFL), a second-tier Australian rules football competition played in the states of Victoria, New South Wales, and Queensland. The season commenced on 25 March and concluded with the grand final on 24 September.

Gold Coast reserves won its first premiership, defeating Werribee by 19 points in the grand final. It was Gold Coast's first premiership in any competition and it was the first time the VFA/VFL premiership had been won by a non-Victorian team.

== Home-and-away season ==
All starting times are local time. Source: AFL.com.au

=== Round 1 ===
	Round 1
Friday, 24 March (7:05 pm)	Carlton 10.9 (69)	def. by	Geelong 12.13 (85)	Ikon Park	Report
Saturday, 25 March (11:05 am)	Collingwood 22.9 (141)	def.	Coburg 6.13 (49)	Victoria Park	Report
Saturday, 25 March (12:05 pm)	Brisbane 10.10 (70)	def.	Werribee 10.9 (69)	Brighton Homes Arena	Report
Saturday, 25 March (1:05 pm)	Gold Coast 12.11 (83)	def.	Williamstown 7.10 (52)	Austworld Centre Oval	Report
Saturday, 25 March (2:05 pm)	Southport 17.16 (118)	def.	Sandringham 4.8 (32)	Fankhauser Reserve	Report
Saturday, 25 March (2:05 pm)	Casey 13.16 (94)	def.	Footscray 8.9 (57)	Casey Fields	Report
Saturday, 25 March (3:05 pm)	North Melbourne 9.12 (66)	def. by	Port Melbourne 12.14 (86)	Arden Street Oval	Report
Sunday, 26 March (10:05 am)	Sydney 10.10 (70)	def. by	Box Hill 14.13 (97)	Tramway Oval	Report
Sunday, 26 March (12:00 pm)	Richmond 16.8 (104)	def.	Northern Bullants 8.9 (57)	Swinburne Centre	Report
Sunday, 26 March (2:05 pm)	Essendon 18.11 (119)	def.	Greater Western Sydney 5.9 (39)	NEC Hangar	Report
	Bye; Frankston

=== Round 2 ===
	Round 2
Thursday, 30 March (3:45 pm)	Footscray 13.7 (85)	def. by	Brisbane 14.9 (93)	Marvel Stadium	Report
Friday, 31 March (7:05 pm)	Frankston 5.17 (47)	def. by	Williamstown 11.8 (74)	Kinetic Stadium	Report
Saturday, 1 April (11:05 am)	North Melbourne 9.12 (66)	def.	Southport 8.10 (58)	Arden Street Oval	Report
Saturday, 1 April (12:55 pm)	Greater Western Sydney 12.11 (83)	def.	Carlton 5.14 (44)	GIANTS Stadium	Report
Saturday, 1 April (2:05 pm)	Coburg 4.12 (36)	def. by	Richmond 11.12 (78)	Piranha Park	Report
Saturday, 1 April (7:05 pm)	Port Melbourne 12.10 (82)	def. by	Collingwood 21.8 (134)	ETU Stadium	Report
Sunday, 2 April (10:25 am)	Gold Coast 28.14 (182)	def.	Geelong 11.9 (75)	Heritage Bank Stadium	Report
Sunday, 2 April (11:05 am)	Casey 13.11 (89)	def.	Sydney 6.11 (47)	Casey Fields	Report
Sunday, 2 April (12:00 pm)	Sandringham 19.12 (126)	def.	Essendon 14.5 (89)	Trevor Barker Beach Oval	Report
	Bye; Box Hill, Northern Bullants, Werribee

=== Round 3 ===
	Round 3
Thursday, 6 April (1:05 pm)	Brisbane 17.16 (118)	def.	Collingwood 7.9 (51)	Brighton Homes Arena	Report
Friday, 7 April (12:30 pm)	North Melbourne 6.10 (46)	def. by	Carlton 14.14 (98)	Arden Street Oval	Report
Friday, 7 April (2:05 am)	Williamstown 19.10 (124)	def.	Port Melbourne 7.5 (47)	DSV Stadium	Report
Saturday, 8 April (11:45 am)	Coburg 9.13 (67)	def. by	Greater Western Sydney 17.11 (113)	Piranha Park	Report
Saturday, 8 April (12:05 pm)	Southport 8.15 (63)	def. by	Werribee 12.14 (86)	Fankhauser Reserve	Report
Saturday, 8 April (1:05 pm)	Richmond 8.9 (57)	def. by	Footscray 12.8 (80)	Swinburne Centre	Report
Sunday, 9 April (11:05 am)	Sandringham 6.14 (50)	def. by	Gold Coast 9.13 (67)	RSEA Park	Report
Sunday, 9 April (1:05 pm)	Northern Bullants 9.11 (65)	def. by	Essendon 12.16 (88)	ETU Stadium	Report
Sunday, 9 April (2:05 pm)	Casey 16.13 (109)	def.	Frankston 7.7 (49)	Casey Fields	Report
Monday, 10 April (11:45 am)	Geelong 7.10 (52)	def. by	Box Hill 16.11 (107)	Melbourne Cricket Ground	Report
	Bye; Sydney
The Northern Bullants vs Essendon match was moved to ETU Stadium because the centre square at Genis Steel Oval was not suitable to be played on.

=== Round 4 ===
	Round 4
Friday, 14 April (7:05 pm)	Carlton 9.14 (68)	def.	Richmond 8.11 (59)	Ikon Park	Report
Saturday, 15 April (12:05 pm)	Brisbane 18.8 (116)	def.	Southport 14.13 (97)	Brighton Homes Arena	Report
Saturday, 15 April (12:35 pm)	Sydney 12.7 (79)	def. by	North Melbourne 17.19 (121)	Blacktown International Sportspark	Report
Saturday, 15 April (1:05 pm)	Werribee 5.17 (47)	def. by	Geelong 9.6 (60)	Avalon Airport Oval	Report
Saturday, 15 April (2:05 pm)	Port Melbourne 13.10 (88)	def.	Northern Bullants 9.9 (63)	ETU Stadium	Report
Saturday, 15 April (3:05 pm)	Williamstown 16.14 (110)	def.	Coburg 8.8 (56)	DSV Stadium	Report
Sunday, 16 April (12:00 pm)	Box Hill 17.12 (114)	def.	Collingwood 8.7 (55)	Box Hill City Oval (crowd: 1,530)	Report
Sunday, 16 April (1:45 pm)	Sandringham 8.8 (56)	def. by	Frankston 12.10 (82)	Trevor Barker Beach Oval	Report
Sunday, 16 April (2:05 pm)	Essendon 5.12 (42)	def. by	Casey 12.10 (82)	NEC Hangar	Report
	Bye; Footscray, Gold Coast, Greater Western Sydney
The Sydney vs North Melbourne match was moved from Tramway Oval to Blacktown International Sportspark.

=== Round 5 ===
	Round 5
Saturday, 22 April (11:05 am)	Greater Western Sydney 11.8 (74)	def. by	Brisbane 23.19 (157)	Blacktown ISP	Report
Saturday, 22 April (12:05 pm)	Footscray 10.16 (76)	def. by	Southport 15.12 (102)	ETU Stadium	Report
Saturday, 22 April (1:05 pm)	Box Hill 19.10 (124)	def.	Coburg 6.17 (53)	Box Hill City Oval (crowd: 1,116)	Report
Sunday, 23 April (11:05 am)	Carlton 9.17 (71)	def.	Sandringham 10.8 (68)	Ikon Park	Report
Sunday, 23 April (12:00 pm)	Collingwood 14.13 (97)	def.	Essendon 13.11 (89)	AIA Centre	Report
Sunday, 23 April (12:05 pm)	Northern Bullants 14.9 (93)	def.	Sydney 9.12 (66)	Genis Steel Oval	Report
Sunday, 23 April (12:55 pm)	Gold Coast 20.16 (136)	def.	North Melbourne 12.8 (80)	Heritage Bank Stadium	Report
Sunday, 23 April (1:35 pm)	Casey 12.8 (82)	def. by	Richmond 14.10 (94)	Casey Fields	Report
Sunday, 23 April (2:05 pm)	Werribee 24.10 (154)	def.	Williamstown 9.7 (61)	Avalon Airport Oval	Report
Monday, 24 April (6:35 pm)	Frankston 13.11 (89)	def. by	Port Melbourne 16.8 (104)	Kinetic Stadium (crowd: 4,000)	Report
	Bye; Geelong

=== Round 6 ===
	Round 6
Saturday, 29 April (11:05 am)	Footscray 9.15 (69)	def.	Carlton 9.10 (64)	ETU Stadium	Report
Saturday, 29 April (12:05 pm)	Southport 18.20 (128)	def.	Northern Bullants 7.4 (46)	Fankhauser Reserve	Report
Sunday, 30 April (11:05 am)	Richmond 9.10 (64)	def. by	Gold Coast 21.11 (137)	Swinburne Centre	Report
Sunday, 30 April (12:00 pm)	Coburg 7.6 (48)	def. by	Geelong 6.20 (56)	Piranha Park	Report
Sunday, 30 April (1:05 pm)	Port Melbourne 10.11 (71)	def. by	Greater Western Sydney 11.7 (73)	ETU Stadium	Report
Sunday, 30 April (2:05 pm)	Box Hill 11.10 (76)	def. by	Casey 16.10 (106)	Wonthaggi Recreation Reserve (crowd: 3,000)	Report
	Bye; Brisbane, Collingwood, Essendon, Frankston, North Melbourne, Sandringham, Sydney, Werribee, Williamstown

=== Round 7 ===
	Round 7
Saturday, 6 May (11:05 am)	Carlton 8.11 (59)	def. by	Brisbane 8.15 (63)	Ikon Park	Report
Saturday, 6 May (12:05 pm)	Gold Coast 17.10 (112)	def.	Casey 13.14 (92)	Heritage Bank Stadium	Report
Saturday, 6 May (12:05 pm)	Frankston 9.6 (60)	def.	Sydney 7.15 (57)	Kinetic Stadium	Report
Saturday, 6 May (12:35 pm)	Greater Western Sydney 15.7 (97)	def.	Footscray 12.12 (84)	Blacktown ISP	Report
Saturday, 6 May (2:05 pm)	Northern Bullants 8.3 (51)	def. by	Box Hill 15.18 (108)	Genis Steel Oval	Report
Sunday, 7 May (12:00 pm)	Geelong 10.4 (64)	def. by	Southport 16.12 (108)	GMHBA Stadium	Report
Sunday, 7 May (12:00 pm)	Williamstown 9.14 (68)	def.	Collingwood 6.8 (44)	DSV Stadium	Report
Sunday, 7 May (1:05 pm)	North Melbourne 14.16 (100)	def.	Sandringham 4.10 (34)	Arden Street Oval	Report
Sunday, 7 May (2:05 pm)	Essendon 8.5 (53)	def. by	Werribee 10.11 (71)	NEC Hangar	Report
	Bye; Coburg, Port Melbourne, Richmond

=== Round 8 ===
	Round 8
Saturday, 13 May (10:35 am)	Sydney 4.10 (34)	def. by	Williamstown 9.13 (67)	Tramway Oval	Report
Saturday, 13 May (11:05 am)	Richmond 11.9 (75)	drew with	Geelong 10.15 (75)	Swinburne Centre	Report
Saturday, 13 May (12:05 pm)	Southport 10.14 (74)	def. by	Gold Coast 12.4 (76)	Fankhauser Reserve	Report
Saturday, 13 May (1:05 pm)	North Melbourne 20.11 (131)	def.	Frankston 9.2 (56)	Arden Street Oval	Report
Saturday, 13 May (2:05 pm)	Coburg 12.8 (80)	def. by	Northern Bullants 12.15 (87)	Piranha Park	Report
Sunday, 14 May (11:05 am)	Collingwood 17.9 (111)	def. by	Greater Western Sydney 17.11 (113)	AIA Centre	Report
Sunday, 14 May (12:05 pm)	Brisbane 16.13 (109)	def.	Essendon 6.5 (41)	Brighton Homes Arena	Report
Sunday, 14 May (2:05 pm)	Sandringham 11.14 (80)	def.	Port Melbourne 8.11 (59)	Trevor Barker Beach Oval	Report
Sunday, 14 May (2:05 pm)	Footscray 8.9 (57)	def. by	Werribee 13.13 (91)	Avalon Airport Oval	Report
	Bye; Box Hill, Carlton, Casey

=== Round 9 ===
	Round 9
Saturday, 20 May (12:05 pm)	Box Hill 11.18 (84)	def.	Southport 6.9 (45)	Box Hill City Oval (crowd: 882)	Report
Saturday, 20 May (12:05 pm)	Werribee 14.7 (91)	def.	Gold Coast 13.11 (89)	Avalon Airport Oval	Report
Saturday, 20 May (11:05 am)	Brisbane 24.11 (155)	def.	Coburg 6.2 (38)	Brighton Homes Arena	Report
Saturday, 20 May (1:05 pm)	Casey 18.9 (117)	def.	North Melbourne 16.6 (102)	Casey Fields	Report
Saturday, 20 May (2:05 pm)	Northern Bullants 8.6 (54)	def. by	Frankston 10.11 (71)	Genis Steel Oval	Report
Saturday, 20 May (2:55 pm)	Essendon 12.10 (82)	def. by	Richmond 12.12 (84)	Melbourne Cricket Ground	Report
Saturday, 20 May (7:05 pm)	Port Melbourne 18.10 (118)	def.	Sydney 8.7 (55)	ETU Stadium	Report
Sunday, 21 May (12:00 pm)	Williamstown 11.14 (80)	def.	Carlton 8.12 (60)	DSV Stadium	Report
Sunday, 21 May (1:05 pm)	Greater Western Sydney 12.15 (87)	def.	Sandringham 9.6 (60)	GIANTS Stadium	Report
	Bye; Collingwood, Geelong, Footscray
The Brisbane vs Coburg match was moved from Sunday, 21 May, to Saturday, 20 May.

=== Round 10 ===
	Round 10
Friday, 26 May (3:05 pm)	Sydney 8.10 (58)	def. by	Carlton 17.8 (110)	Tramway Oval	Report
Saturday, 27 May (12:05 pm)	Gold Coast 21.16 (142)	def.	Footscray 10.17 (77)	TIO Stadium	Report
Saturday, 27 May (2:05 pm)	Werribee 16.10 (106)	def.	Casey 12.6 (78)	Avalon Airport Oval	Report
Saturday, 27 May (5:10 pm)	Sandringham 15.13 (103)	def.	Coburg 7.4 (46)	RSEA Park	Report
Saturday, 27 May (7:05 pm)	Frankston 8.10 (58)	def. by	Brisbane 13.15 (93)	Kinetic Stadium	Report
Sunday, 28 May (11:05 am)	Collingwood 5.13 (43)	def. by	North Melbourne 11.16 (82)	AIA Centre	Report
Sunday, 28 May (12:00 pm)	Geelong 10.13 (73)	def.	Port Melbourne 8.12 (60)	GMHBA Stadium	Report
Sunday, 28 May (1:05 pm)	Essendon 8.10 (58)	def. by	Box Hill 15.15 (105)	NEC Hangar	Report
	Bye; Greater Western Sydney, Northern Bullants, Richmond, Southport, Williamstown

=== Round 11 ===
	Round 11
Saturday, 3 June (12:05 pm)	Southport 11.9 (75)	def. by	Casey 11.10 (76)	Fankhauser Reserve	Report
Saturday, 3 June (1:05 pm)	Port Melbourne 7.9 (51)	def. by	Gold Coast 17.13 (115)	ETU Stadium	Report
Saturday, 3 June (1:05 pm)	Coburg 5.7 (37)	def. by	Werribee 13.19 (97)	Piranha Park	Report
Saturday, 3 June (2:05 pm)	Carlton 10.16 (76)	def.	Frankston 10.13 (73)	Ikon Park	Report
Saturday, 3 June (2:05 pm)	Box Hill 9.7 (61)	def. by	Williamstown 11.10 (76)	Box Hill City Oval (crowd: 1,136)	Report
Saturday, 3 June (2:35 pm)	Footscray 15.18 (108)	def.	Geelong 7.8 (50)	Avalon Airport Oval	Report
Sunday, 4 June (9:30 am)	Greater Western Sydney 12.8 (80)	def. by	Richmond 10.22 (82)	GIANTS Stadium	Report
Sunday, 4 June (1:35 pm)	Essendon 10.9 (69)	def. by	North Melbourne 12.8 (80)	NEC Hangar	Report
Sunday, 4 June (2:05 pm)	Northern Bullants 9.10 (64)	def. by	Collingwood 16.19 (115)	Genis Steel Oval	Report
	Bye; Brisbane, Sandringham, Sydney
Jacob Bauer (Richmond) kicked a goal after the final siren to clinch the Tigers win over the Giants.

=== Round 12 ===
	Round 12
Friday, 9 June (1:05 pm)	Sydney 12.7 (79)	def.	Sandringham 11.10 (76)	Tramway Oval	Report
Saturday, 10 June (12:05 pm)	Box Hill 16.13 (109)	def.	Brisbane 12.18 (90)	Box Hill City Oval (crowd: 752)	Report
Saturday, 10 June (1:05 pm)	Southport 13.13 (91)	def.	Port Melbourne 9.13 (67)	Fankhauser Reserve	Report
Saturday, 10 June (1:05 pm)	Frankston 12.9 (81)	def. by	Footscray 15.10 (100)	Kinetic Stadium	Report
Saturday, 10 June (2:05 pm)	Williamstown 15.18 (108)	def.	Northern Bullants 5.3 (33)	DSV Stadium	Report
Sunday, 11 June (12:05 pm)	North Melbourne 14.12 (96)	def.	Greater Western Sydney 6.8 (44)	Arden Street Oval	Report
Sunday, 11 June (1:05 pm)	Richmond 4.13 (37)	def. by	Werribee 11.16 (82)	Swinburne Centre	Report
Sunday, 11 June (1:05 pm)	Casey 8.11 (59)	def. by	Collingwood 11.7 (73)	Casey Fields	Report
Sunday, 11 June (2:05 pm)	Carlton 14.15 (99)	def.	Essendon 10.8 (68)	Ikon Park	Report
	Bye; Coburg, Geelong, Gold Coast

=== Round 13 ===
	Round 13
Friday, 16 June (7:35 pm)	Geelong 10.12 (72)	def.	Frankston 11.4 (70)	GMHBA Stadium	Report
Saturday, 17 June (11:05 am)	Brisbane 21.16 (142)	def.	Sydney 4.7 (31)	Brighton Homes Arena	Report
Saturday, 17 June (12:05 pm)	Greater Western Sydney 19.14 (128)	def.	Southport 11.13 (79)	Tom Wills Oval	Report
Saturday, 17 June (1:05 pm)	Richmond 12.15 (87)	def.	Sandringham 7.13 (55)	Swinburne Centre	Report
Saturday, 17 June (2:05 pm)	Werribee 11.10 (76)	def.	Carlton 10.10 (70)	Avalon Airport Oval	Report
Saturday, 17 June (2:05 pm)	Williamstown 6.12 (48)	def. by	Footscray 11.12 (78)	DSV Stadium	Report
Sunday, 18 June (12:05 pm)	Northern Bullants 3.6 (24)	def. by	Gold Coast 22.14 (146)	Genis Steel Oval	Report
Sunday, 18 June (1:05 pm)	Coburg 9.11 (65)	def. by	North Melbourne 13.17 (95)	Piranha Park	Report
	Bye; Box Hill, Casey, Collingwood, Essendon, Port Melbourne

=== Round 14 ===
	Round 14
Friday, 23 June (7:05 pm)	Geelong 5.10 (40)	def. by	Casey 11.14 (80)	GMHBA Stadium	Report
Saturday, 24 June (11:05 am)	Sandringham 12.7 (79)	drew with	Brisbane 11.13 (79)	Trevor Barker Beach Oval	Report
Saturday, 24 June (11:05 am)	Southport 15.12 (102)	def.	Coburg 9.8 (62)	Fankhauser Reserve	Report
Saturday, 24 June (10:05 am)	Collingwood 14.10 (94)	def.	Sydney 9.17 (71)	AIA Centre	Report
Sunday, 25 June (1:05 pm)	Gold Coast 24.5 (149)	def.	Box Hill 12.13 (85)	Heritage Bank Stadium	Report
Sunday, 25 June (2:05 pm)	Port Melbourne 13.13 (91)	def.	Essendon 5.8 (38)	ETU Stadium	Report
	Bye; Carlton, Footscray, Frankston, Greater Western Sydney, Northern Bullants, North Melbourne, Richmond, Werribee, Williamstown

=== Round 15 ===
	Round 15
Friday, 30 June (11:05 am)	Brisbane 7.16 (58)	def. by	Richmond 8.11 (59)	Brighton Homes Arena	Report
Friday, 30 June (4:05 pm)	Sydney 10.9 (69)	def. by	Geelong 12.5 (77)	Sydney Cricket Ground	Report
Saturday, 1 July (11:05 am)	Footscray 17.6 (108)	def.	Coburg 11.10 (76)	ETU Stadium	Report
Saturday, 1 July (1:05 pm)	Werribee 22.9 (141)	def.	Sandringham 9.11 (65)	Avalon Airport Oval	Report
Saturday, 1 July (2:05 pm)	Box Hill 12.11 (83)	def.	Port Melbourne 8.12 (60)	Box Hill City Oval (crowd: 1,171)	Report
Saturday, 1 July (2:05 pm)	Carlton 18.17 (125)	def.	Northern Bullants 6.4 (40)	Ikon Park	Report
Sunday, 2 July (12:00 pm)	Frankston 4.7 (31)	def. by	Collingwood 18.18 (126)	Kinetic Stadium	Report
Sunday, 2 July (12:05 pm)	Casey 20.14 (134)	def.	Greater Western Sydney 4.14 (38)	Casey Fields	Report
Sunday, 2 July (12:35 pm)	North Melbourne 12.15 (87)	def.	Williamstown 5.4 (34)	Arden Street Oval	Report
Sunday, 2 July (1:05 pm)	Essendon 11.11 (77)	def.	Gold Coast 12.4 (76)	Windy Hill	Report
	Bye; Southport
For the second time for the season, Jacob Bauer (Richmond) kicked a goal after the final siren to win the game, this time against Brisbane.; Anthony McDonald-Tipungwuti (Essendon) kicked a behind after the final siren to win the game against Gold Coast.

=== Round 16 ===
	Round 16
Thursday, 6 July (2:05 pm)	Richmond 9.13 (67)	def. by	Sydney 12.16 (88)	Swinburne Centre	Report
Friday, 7 July (4:05 pm)	Footscray 14.13 (97)	def.	Collingwood 11.11 (77)	ETU Stadium	Report
Saturday, 8 July (12:05 pm)	Gold Coast 22.12 (144)	def.	Frankston 5.7 (37)	Heritage Bank Stadium	Report
Saturday, 8 July (12:05 pm)	Northern Bullants 2.5 (17)	def. by	Brisbane 22.13 (145)	Genis Steel Oval	Report
Saturday, 8 July (12:55 pm)	Greater Western Sydney 11.9 (75)	def. by	Box Hill 13.11 (89)	GIANTS Stadium	Report
Saturday, 8 July (1:05 pm)	Coburg 11.5 (71)	def. by	Carlton 18.15 (123)	Piranha Park	Report
Saturday, 8 July (3:05 pm)	Port Melbourne 7.9 (51)	def. by	Werribee 10.14 (74)	ETU Stadium	Report
Sunday, 9 July (12:05 pm)	Williamstown 9.9 (63)	def.	Southport 8.5 (53)	DSV Stadium	Report
Sunday, 9 July (1:05 pm)	Sandringham 8.11 (59)	def. by	Casey 13.15 (93)	Trevor Barker Beach Oval	Report
Sunday, 9 July (5:35 pm)	Geelong 9.4 (58)	def. by	North Melbourne 15.11 (101)	GMHBA Stadium	Report
	Bye; Essendon

=== Round 17 ===
	Round 17
Saturday, 15 July (12:05 pm)	Southport 12.13 (85)	def. by	Richmond 15.8 (98)	Fankhauser Reserve	Report
Saturday, 15 July (1:05 pm)	Sydney 8.8 (56)	def. by	Footscray 17.16 (118)	Tramway Oval	Report
Saturday, 15 July (2:05 pm)	Werribee 23.23 (161)	def.	Northern Bullants 2.5 (17)	Avalon Airport Oval	Report
Sunday, 16 July (12:05 pm)	North Melbourne 10.8 (68)	def. by	Box Hill 10.13 (73)	Arden Street Oval	Report
Sunday, 16 July (1:05 pm)	Frankston 6.18 (54)	def. by	Greater Western Sydney 8.7 (55)	Kinetic Stadium	Report
Sunday, 16 July (2:05 pm)	Geelong 7.12 (54)	def. by	Essendon 9.10 (64)	GMHBA Stadium	Report
	Bye; Brisbane, Carlton, Casey, Coburg, Collingwood, Gold Coast, Port Melbourne, Sandringham, Williamstown
Max Williams (Frankston) had a shot for goal after the siren, but his kick fell short of recording a score.

=== Round 18 ===
	Round 18
Friday, 21 July (7:05 pm)	Williamstown 9.15 (69)	def.	Essendon 9.9 (63)	ETU Stadium	Report
Saturday, 22 July (10:05 am)	Richmond 12.9 (81)	def. by	Box Hill 12.12 (84)	Swinburne Centre	Report
Saturday, 22 July (11:05 am)	Brisbane 17.10 (112)	def.	Geelong 12.5 (77)	Brighton Homes Arena	Report
Saturday, 22 July (11:05 am)	Carlton 15.15 (105)	def.	Port Melbourne 10.9 (69)	Ikon Park	Report
Saturday, 22 July (1:05 pm)	Coburg 7.11 (53)	def. by	Casey 13.17 (95)	Piranha Park	Report
Saturday, 22 July (1:05 pm)	Werribee 15.19 (109)	def.	Frankston 10.5 (65)	Avalon Airport Oval	Report
Saturday, 22 July (2:05 pm)	Northern Bullants 0.4 (4)	def. by	Footscray 24.17 (161)	Genis Steel Oval	Report
Sunday, 23 July (9:25 am)	Greater Western Sydney 12.7 (79)	def. by	Gold Coast 17.17 (119)	Manuka Oval	Report
Sunday, 23 July (12:00 pm)	Collingwood 9.10 (64)	def.	Sandringham 6.12 (48)	AIA Centre	Report
	Bye; North Melbourne, Southport, Sydney
Ben Jolley (Williamstown) played his 303rd VFL game, breaking Bill Swan's record for most career VFA/VFL games played.; Northern Bullants scored only 0.4 (4) against Footscray, equalling the lowest score in the club's VFA/VFL history and the lowest score by any club since 1919.

=== Round 19 ===
	Round 19
Friday, 28 July (7:05 pm)	Port Melbourne 11.14 (80)	def.	Coburg 10.10 (70)	ETU Stadium	Report
Saturday, 29 July (12:05 pm)	Gold Coast 13.14 (92)	def.	Brisbane 11.8 (74)	Heritage Bank Stadium	Report
Saturday, 29 July (1:05 pm)	Collingwood 14.16 (100)	def.	Carlton 11.6 (72)	Victoria Park	Report
Saturday, 29 July (2:05 pm)	Box Hill 17.19 (121)	def.	Sandringham 11.8 (74)	Box Hill City Oval (crowd: 1,424)	Report
Saturday, 29 July (7:05 pm)	Frankston 8.9 (57)	def. by	Southport 10.11 (71)	Kinetic Stadium	Report
Sunday, 30 July (12:05 pm)	Casey 11.8 (74)	def. by	Williamstown 11.9 (75)	Casey Fields	Report
Sunday, 30 July (12:05 pm)	Geelong 19.18 (132)	def.	Northern Bullants 6.6 (42)	GMHBA Stadium	Report
Sunday, 30 July (1:05 pm)	Essendon 6.8 (44)	def. by	Sydney 19.12 (126)	Windy Hill	Report
Sunday, 30 July (1:05 pm)	North Melbourne 7.11 (53)	def. by	Werribee 16.14 (110)	Arden Street Oval	Report
	Bye; Footscray, Greater Western Sydney, Richmond

=== Round 20 ===
	Round 20
Saturday, 5 August (12:05 pm)	Southport 12.15 (87)	def.	Essendon 12.7 (79)	Fankhauser Reserve	Report
Saturday, 5 August (1:05 pm)	Footscray 18.13 (121)	def.	North Melbourne 8.7 (55)	ETU Stadium	Report
Saturday, 5 August (2:05 pm)	Williamstown 13.5 (83)	def.	Richmond 8.13 (61)	DSV Stadium	Report
Saturday, 5 August (3:45 pm)	Greater Western Sydney 9.13 (67)	def. by	Sydney 22.13 (145)	GIANTS Stadium	Report
Sunday, 6 August (12:00 pm)	Werribee 14.9 (93)	def.	Collingwood 8.10 (58)	Avalon Airport Oval	Report
Sunday, 6 August (2:05 pm)	Sandringham 20.11 (131)	def.	Northern Bullants 4.8 (32)	Trevor Barker Beach Oval	Report
	Bye; Box Hill, Brisbane, Carlton, Casey, Coburg, Frankston, Geelong, Gold Coast, Port Melbourne
Werribee broke its club record for most consecutive games won (14) having equalled the record the week before.

=== Round 21 ===
	Round 21
Saturday, 12 August (10:05 am)	Sydney 8.6 (54)	def. by	Gold Coast 19.8 (122)	Sydney Cricket Ground	Report
Saturday, 12 August (11:05 am)	Brisbane 13.6 (84)	def. by	Williamstown 14.6 (90)	Brighton Homes Arena	Report
Saturday, 12 August (12:05 pm)	Collingwood 20.9 (129)	def.	Geelong 8.7 (55)	Victoria Park	Report
Saturday, 12 August (12:05 pm)	Northern Bullants 8.7 (55)	def. by	Greater Western Sydney 20.11 (131)	Genis Steel Oval	Report
Saturday, 12 August (1:05 pm)	Coburg 4.6 (30)	def. by	Frankston 9.12 (66)	Piranha Park	Report
Saturday, 12 August (2:05 pm)	Box Hill 8.8 (56)	def. by	Footscray 11.10 (76)	Box Hill City Oval (crowd: 1,225)	Report
Saturday, 12 August (2:05 pm)	Port Melbourne 7.9 (51)	def. by	Richmond 10.12 (72)	Swinburne Centre	Report
Sunday, 13 August (12:00 pm)	Carlton 11.11 (77)	def.	Casey 9.15 (69)	Ikon Park	Report
	Bye; Essendon, North Melbourne, Sandringham, Southport, Werribee
Port Melbourne's home game against Richmond was moved from ETU Stadium to Swinburne Centre and held an hour earlier than originally scheduled because of problems with the ground.

=== Round 22 ===
	Round 22
Friday, 18 August (7:05 pm)	Frankston 10.6 (66)	def. by	Box Hill 16.9 (105)	Kinetic Stadium	Report
Saturday, 19 August (10:25 am)	Gold Coast 23.11 (149)	def.	Carlton 2.10 (22)	Heritage Bank Stadium	Report
Saturday, 19 August (11:05 am)	Geelong 14.8 (92)	def.	Greater Western Sydney 11.12 (78)	GMHBA Stadium	Report
Saturday, 19 August (11:05 am)	Footscray 16.11 (107)	def.	Port Melbourne 4.11 (35)	DSV Stadium	Report
Saturday, 19 August (12:05 pm)	Collingwood 16.12 (108)	def.	Southport 8.10 (58)	AIA Centre	Report
Saturday, 19 August (4:05 pm)	Essendon 15.10 (100)	def.	Coburg 12.13 (85)	DSV Stadium	Report
Sunday, 20 August (12:00 pm)	Richmond 13.10 (88)	def.	North Melbourne 11.10 (76)	Swinburne Centre	Report
Sunday, 20 August (12:05 pm)	Casey 12.6 (78)	def. by	Brisbane 11.14 (80)	Casey Fields	Report
Sunday, 20 August (1:05 pm)	Sydney 8.8 (56)	def. by	Werribee 13.11 (89)	Tramway Oval	Report
Sunday, 20 August (2:05 pm)	Sandringham 16.6 (102)	def.	Williamstown 10.7 (67)	Trevor Barker Beach Oval	Report
	Bye; Northern Bullants
Port Melbourne's home game against Footscray was moved from ETU Stadium to DSV Stadium because of problems with the ground for the second consecutive week, starting at 11:05am on Saturday instead of the originally scheduled time of 1:05pm on Sunday (it was also initially planned to be moved to 12:05pm on Sunday).; Essendon's home game at Windy Hill against Coburg was also moved to DSV Stadium, starting at 4:05pm on Saturday instead of the originally scheduled time of 1:05pm on Sunday.

== Ladder ==
Pos	Team	Pld	W	L	D	PF	PA	PP	Pts	Qualification
1	Gold Coast (R) (P)	18	16	2	0	2137	1158	184.5	64	Finals series
2	Werribee	18	16	2	0	1747	1040	168.0	64	Finals series
3	Box Hill	18	14	4	0	1681	1305	128.8	56	Finals series
4	Brisbane (R)	18	13	4	1	1838	1204	152.7	54	Finals series
5	Williamstown	18	13	5	0	1349	1222	110.4	52	Finals series
6	Footscray (R)	18	12	6	0	1659	1278	129.8	48	Finals series
7	Casey	18	11	7	0	1607	1255	128.0	44	Finals series
8	Collingwood (R)	18	11	7	0	1620	1363	118.9	44	Finals series
9	Richmond (R)	18	10	7	1	1347	1359	99.1	42	Finals series
10	North Melbourne (R)	18	10	8	0	1505	1369	109.9	40	Finals series
11	Carlton (R)	18	10	8	0	1412	1326	106.5	40	
12	Greater Western Sydney (R)	18	9	9	0	1454	1658	87.7	36	
13	Geelong (R)	18	8	9	1	1247	1549	80.5	34	
14	Southport	18	8	10	0	1494	1384	107.9	32	
15	Port Melbourne	18	6	12	0	1270	1512	84.0	24	
16	Sandringham	18	5	12	1	1298	1482	87.6	22	
17	Essendon (R)	18	5	13	0	1263	1545	81.7	20	
18	Sydney (R)	18	4	14	0	1241	1651	75.2	16	
19	Frankston	18	4	14	0	1112	1566	71.0	16	
20	Northern Bullants	18	2	16	0	844	2088	40.4	8	
21	Coburg	18	0	18	0	1022	1833	55.8	0	

Source: afl.com.au
Rules for classification: 1) points; 2) percentage; 3) number of points for
(R) = Reserves
(P) Premiers

== Finals series ==
Wildcard finals
27 August, Casey Fields
7	Casey	20.14 (134)
10	North Melbourne	5.3 (33)
27 August, Swinburne Centre
8	Collingwood	21.9 (135)
9	Richmond	8.12 (60)

Qualifying and elimination finals
2 September, Heritage Bank Stadium
1	Gold Coast	19.13 (127)
4	Brisbane	12.12 (84)
2 September, DSV Stadium
5	Williamstown	12.10 (82)
Collingwood	3.9 (27)
2 September, Box Hill City Oval
6	Footscray	22.16 (148)
Casey	10.9 (69)
2 September, Avalon Airport Oval
2	Werribee	11.14 (80)
3	Box Hill	8.12 (60)

Semi-finals
9 September, Brighton Homes Arena
Brisbane	12.16 (88)
Williamstown	7.6 (48)
9 September, Box Hill City Oval
Box Hill	14.11 (95)
Footscray	10.15 (75)

Preliminary finals
16 September, Heritage Bank Stadium
Gold Coast	12.16 (88)
Box Hill	11.7 (73)
16 September, Avalon Airport Oval
Werribee	14.10 (94)
Brisbane	9.10 (64)

Grand final
24 September, Ikon Park
Gold Coast	17.10 (112)
Werribee	14.9 (93)

All starting times are local time. Source: afl.com.au

=== Wildcard finals ===
For the first time, the VFL introduced a Wildcard Round, which played after the home-and-away season is complete and considered part of the overall finals series. The seventh placed team played the tenth placed team, and the eighth placed team played the ninth placed team. The winners advanced to elimination finals, assuming the seventh and eighth positions under the AFL finals system.

	Wildcard finals
Sunday, 27 August (12:00 pm)	Collingwood 21.9 (135)	def.	Richmond 8.12 (60)	Swinburne Centre	Report
Sunday, 27 August (2:45 pm)	Casey 20.14 (134)	def.	North Melbourne 5.3 (33)	Casey Fields	Report

=== Qualifying finals and elimination finals ===
	Qualifying finals
QF2: 2 September (2:05 pm)	Werribee 11.14 (80)	def.	Box Hill 8.12 (60)	Avalon Airport Oval	Report
QF1: 2 September (6:05 pm)	Gold Coast 19.13 (127)	def.	Brisbane 12.12 (84)	Heritage Bank Stadium	Report

	Elimination finals
EF2: 2 September (12:00 pm)	Footscray 22.16 (148)	def.	Casey 10.9 (69)	Box Hill City Oval	Report
EF1: 2 September (3:00 pm)	Williamstown 12.10 (82)	def.	Collingwood 3.9 (27)	DSV Stadium	Report

=== Semi-finals ===
	Semi-finals
SF2: 9 September (11:30 am)	Box Hill 14.11 (95)	def.	Footscray 10.15 (75)	Box Hill City Oval (crowd: 2,534)	Report
SF1: 9 September (1:15 pm)	Brisbane 12.16 (88)	def.	Williamstown 7.6 (48)	Brighton Homes Arena	Report

=== Preliminary finals ===
	Preliminary finals
PF2: 16 September (12:00 pm)	Werribee 14.10 (94)	def.	Brisbane 9.10 (64)	Avalon Airport Oval	Report
PF1: 16 September (3:00 pm)	Gold Coast 12.16 (88)	def.	Box Hill 11.7 (73)	Heritage Bank Stadium	Report

=== Grand Final ===
2023 VFL Grand Final
Sunday 24 September (3:10 pm)	Gold Coast	def.	Werribee	Ikon Park, Melbourne (crowd: 7,148)	Report
4.2 (26); 8.3 (51); 12.8 (80); 17.10 (112)	Q1; Q2; Q3; Final	3.1 (19); 6.5 (35); 8.5 (53); 14.9 (93)	Norm Goss Memorial Medal: Shaun Mannagh (Werribee); Television broadcast: Seven Network
4: Chol; 3: Burgess, McLaughlin; 2: Day, Sexton; 1: Sharp, Lombard, Lake	Goals	6: Mannagh; 2: Grintell; 1: Declase, Garoni, Gray, Hanson, Henderson, Paea
Hollands, Moyle, Burgess, Chol, Jeffrey, Graham, Blakely	Best	Mannagh, Hanson, Clohesy, Henderson, Brew, Gribble, Declase
Nil	Injuries	Nil
Nil	Reports	Nil

==== Teams ====
Gold Coast
B:	42. Jake Stein	46. Caleb Graham	32. Bodhi Uwland
HB:	38. Lloyd Johnston	50. Jy Farrar	40. Joel Jeffrey
C:	20. Jeremy Sharp	33. Charlie Constable	37. Oskar Faulkhead
HF:	47. Hewago Oea	43. Brodie McLaughlin	6. Alex Sexton
F:	1. Mabior Chol	12. Sam Day	29. Chris Burgess
Foll:	49. Ned Moyle	5. Alex Davies	26. Connor Blakely
Int:	56. Jared Eckersley	54. Leo Lombard	51. Campbell Lake
Int:	45. Sandy Brock	36. Elijah Hollands	
Coach:	Josh Drummond		

Werribee
B:	27. Jesse Clark	18. Nathan Cooper	9. Louis Pinnuck
HB:	3. Michael Sodomaco	5. Nick Coughlan (c)	35. Sam Clohesy
C:	15. Kye Declase	4. Tom Gribble	22. Bior Malual
HF:	6. Shaun Mannagh	1. Hudson Garoni	8. Jack Henderson
F:	28. Noah Lever	32. Sam Paea	7. Nick Hayes
Foll:	36. Kobe Annand	11. Matthew Hanson	29. Dom Brew
Int:	21. Joshua Porter	12. Wardell Lual	13. Keegan Gray
Int:	30. Lucas Rocci	16. Harrison Grintell	
Coach:	Michael Barlow		

== Awards ==
- The J. J. Liston Trophy was won by Jarryd Lyons (Brisbane), who polled 26 votes. Lyons finished ahead of Boyd Woodcock (Southport) who polled 24 votes to finish second in the count for the second consecutive season; and Tom Gribble (Werribee) and Lachlan Sullivan (Footscray) who polled 21 votes.
- The Jim 'Frosty' Miller Medal was jointly won by Chris Burgess and Brodie McLaughlin (Gold Coast), who both kicked 51 goals during the home-and-away season. It was Burgess' second year in a row taking out the award.
- The Fothergill–Round–Mitchell Medal was won by Sam Clohesy (Werribee).
- The Coaches MVP award was won by Lachlan Sullivan (Footscray).

=== Team of the Year ===
2023 VFL Team of the Year
B:	Caleb Graham (Gold Coast)	Oscar McDonald (Williamstown)	Marty Hore (Williamstown)
HB:	Charlie Constable (Gold Coast)	Nick Coughlan (Werribee)	Callum Brown (Box Hill)
C:	Jaxon Binns (Carlton)	Jarryd Lyons (Brisbane)	Tom Gribble (Werribee)
HF:	Shaun Mannagh (Werribee)	Brandon Ryan (Northern Bullants/Box Hill)	Boyd Woodcock (Southport)
F:	Brodie McLaughlin (Gold Coast)	Chris Burgess (Gold Coast)	Oliver Dempsey (Geelong)
Foll:	Jordon Sweet (Footscray)	Lachlan Sullivan (c) (Footscray)	Dom Brew (Werribee)
Int:	Tom Downie (Williamstown)	Jacob Dawson (Southport)	Luke Dunstan (Casey)
Int:	Cameron Fleeton (Greater Western Sydney)	Will Fordham (Frankston)	Jean-Luc Velissaris (Northern Bullants)
Coach:	Michael Barlow (Werribee)		

== See also ==
- 2023 VFL Women's season
- 2023 AFL season
