= 2022 VFL season =

140th season of the Victorian Football League

- Date: 25 March – 18 September 2022
- Teams: 21
- Premiers: Casey; 6th premiership
- Minor premiers: Casey; 5th minor premiership
- J. J. Liston Trophy: Tom Gribble (Werribee – 30 votes)
- Frosty Miller Medallist: Chris Burgess (Gold Coast – 52 goals)
- Matches played: 198

The 2022 VFL season was the 140th season of the Victorian Football League (VFL), a second-tier Australian rules football competition played in the states of Victoria, New South Wales, and Queensland. The season commenced on 25 March and concluded with the Grand Final on 18 September.

The premiership was won by Casey, after it defeated Southport in the Grand Final on 18 September 2022 by 32 points. It was Casey's sixth Division 1 premiership.

== League membership ==
Following its sole season in the VFL, the Brisbane-based Aspley Football Club withdrew from the competition, after reviewing its strategy as a football club and electing to focus on its QAFL and QFA teams and junior pathways without the burden of competing in the state level competition. The club departed with the shortest tenure of any VFA/VFL club in history, playing only ten games in the pandemic-interrupted 2021 season.

Aspley's departure left Southport as the league's sole stand-alone senior club based outside Victoria. A total of 21 clubs held licences to compete in the 2022 season.

== Home-and-away season ==
=== Round 1 ===
| | Round 1 |
| Friday, 25 March (4:35 pm) | Footscray 6.10 (46) | def. by | Sydney 13.12 (90) | VU Whitten Oval | Report |
| Friday, 25 March (5:05 pm) | Carlton 11.18 (84) | def. | Brisbane 5.12 (42) | Ikon Park | Report |
| Saturday, 26 March (2:05 pm) | Geelong 12.14 (86) | def. | Essendon 8.10 (58) | GMHBA Stadium | Report |
| Saturday, 26 March (3:05 pm) | Gold Coast 20.11 (131) | def. | Northern Bullants 11.10 (76) | Metricon Stadium | Report |
| Saturday, 26 March (7:05 pm) | Frankston 7.15 (57) | def. by | Werribee 12.11 (83) | Skybus Stadium | Report |
| Sunday, 27 March (11:35 am) | Richmond 16.4 (100) | def. | Southport 10.9 (69) | Swinburne Centre | Report |
| Sunday, 27 March (12:00 pm) | Collingwood 18.4 (112) | def. | Box Hill 17.8 (110) | Victoria Park | Report |
| Sunday, 27 March (1:05 pm) | Casey 21.14 (140) | def. | Sandringham 8.9 (57) | Casey Fields | Report |
| Sunday, 27 March (2:05 pm) | Greater Western Sydney 10.13 (73) | def. | Port Melbourne 7.14 (55) | Blacktown ISP Oval | Report |
| Sunday, 27 March (4:05 pm) | North Melbourne 15.12 (102) | def. | Williamstown 11.12 (78) | Arden Street Oval | Report |
| | Bye; Coburg |

=== Round 2 ===
| | Round 2 |
| Thursday, 31 March (5:35 pm) | Footscray 10.12 (72) | def. | Northern Bullants 10.10 (70) | VU Whitten Oval | Report |
| Friday, 1 April (7:05 pm) | Sydney 15.11 (101) | def. by | Gold Coast 15.13 (103) | Blacktown ISP Oval | Report |
| Saturday, 2 April (1:05 pm) | Coburg 8.16 (64) | def. | Port Melbourne 9.8 (62) | Piranha Park | Report |
| Saturday, 2 April (2:05 pm) | Brisbane 25.6 (156) | def. | North Melbourne 7.10 (52) | Moreton Bay Sports Complex | Report |
| Saturday, 2 April (2:05 pm) | Collingwood 15.10 (100) | def. | Geelong 11.12 (78) | AIA Centre | Report |
| Saturday, 2 April (2:05 pm) | Southport 18.11 (119) | def. | Williamstown 10.2 (62) | Fankhauser Reserve | Report |
| Saturday, 2 April (3:05 pm) | Casey 13.13 (91) | def. | Essendon 13.10 (88) | Casey Fields | Report |
| Saturday, 2 April (7:05 pm) | Frankston 4.6 (30) | def. by | Greater Western Sydney 8.9 (57) | Skybus Stadium | Report |
| Sunday, 3 April (12:00 pm) | Sandringham 15.4 (94) | def. | Richmond 5.10 (40) | Trevor Barker Beach Oval | Report |
| Sunday, 3 April (3:05 pm) | Box Hill 8.11 (59) | def. by | Carlton 16.9 (105) | Box Hill City Oval (crowd: 860) | Report |
| | Bye; Werribee |

=== Round 3 ===
| | Round 3 |
| Friday, 8 April (4:05 pm) | Geelong 13.12 (90) | def. | Brisbane 13.5 (83) | GMHBA Stadium | Report |
| Saturday, 9 April (12:05 pm) | Northern Bullants 8.14 (62) | def. by | Collingwood 14.13 (97) | Preston City Oval | Report |
| Saturday, 9 April (1:05 pm) | Port Melbourne 10.5 (65) | def. by | Sydney 10.12 (72) | ETU Stadium | Report |
| Saturday, 9 April (1:35 pm) | Greater Western Sydney 16.10 (106) | def. | Coburg 9.10 (64) | Blacktown ISP Oval | Report |
| Saturday, 9 April (2:05 pm) | Richmond 14.11 (95) | def. | Footscray 10.9 (69) | Swinburne Centre | Report |
| Saturday, 9 April (7:05 pm) | Werribee 11.12 (78) | def. by | Southport 19.16 (130) | Avalon Airport Oval | Report |
| Saturday, 9 April (7:10 pm) | Williamstown 9.11 (65) | def. by | Casey 15.10 (100) | Williamstown Cricket Ground | Report |
| Sunday, 10 April (12:00 pm) | Box Hill 15.9 (99) | def. | Sandringham 7.14 (56) | Melbourne Cricket Ground | Report |
| Sunday, 10 April (12:35 pm) | Essendon 16.12 (108) | def. by | Frankston 20.18 (138) | The Hangar | Report |
| Sunday, 10 April (12:35 pm) | Gold Coast 7.19 (61) | def. by | Carlton 17.11 (113) | Metricon Stadium | Report |
| | Bye; North Melbourne |

=== Round 4 ===
| | Round 4 |
| Thursday, 14 April (7:05 pm) | Southport 15.13 (103) | def. | Geelong 8.8 (56) | Fankhauser Reserve | Report |
| Friday, 15 April (12:05 pm) | North Melbourne 13.7 (85) | def. | Footscray 10.19 (79) | Arden Street Oval | Report |
| Friday, 15 April (1:05 pm) | Williamstown 9.4 (58) | def. by | Werribee 8.17 (65) | Williamstown Cricket Ground | Report |
| Saturday, 16 April (11:05 am) | Sandringham 16.13 (109) | def. | Gold Coast 15.11 (101) | Trevor Barker Beach Oval | Report |
| Saturday, 16 April (2:05 pm) | Collingwood 12.7 (79) | def. by | Greater Western Sydney 14.12 (96) | AIA Centre | Report |
| Sunday 17 April (11:05 am) | Carlton 11.6 (72) | def. by | Richmond 15.7 (97) | Ikon Park | Report |
| Sunday, 17 April (1:05 pm) | Sydney 13.7 (85) | def. by | Northern Bullants 15.14 (104) | Blacktown ISP Oval | Report |
| Sunday, 17 April (1:35 pm) | Casey 13.12 (90) | def. | Coburg 8.7 (55) | Casey Fields | Report |
| Sunday, 17 April (2:05 pm) | Port Melbourne 21.10 (136) | def. | Essendon 17.9 (111) | ETU Stadium | Report |
| | Bye; Box Hill, Frankston, Brisbane |

=== Round 5 ===
| | Round 5 |
| Saturday, 23 April (1:35 pm) | Greater Western Sydney 8.11 (59) | drew with | Sandringham 8.11 (59) | Blacktown ISP Oval | Report |
| Saturday, 23 April (2:05 pm) | Werribee 10.14 (74) | def. by | Carlton 14.9 (93) | Ikon Park | Report |
| Saturday, 23 April (3:05 pm) | Footscray 12.12 (84) | def. by | Southport 13.11 (89) | VU Whitten Oval | Report |
| Sunday, 24 April (11:05 am) | Brisbane 11.18 (84) | def. | Port Melbourne 6.9 (45) | Moreton Bay Sports Complex | Report |
| Sunday, 24 April (1:05 pm) | Coburg 6.7 (43) | def. by | Box Hill 8.19 (67) | Piranha Park | Report |
| Sunday 24 April (2:10 pm) | Richmond 9.10 (64) | def. by | Casey 13.9 (87) | Swinburne Centre | Report |
| Sunday, 24 April (7:05 pm) | Frankston 15.14 (104) | def. | North Melbourne 8.12 (60) | Skybus Stadium | Report |
| Monday, 25 April (1:05 pm) | Essendon 10.13 (73) | def. by | Collingwood 20.11 (131) | Windy Hill | Report |
| | Bye; Geelong, Williamstown, Gold Coast, Sydney, Northern Bullants |

=== Round 6 ===
| | Round 6 |
| Saturday, 30 April (1:05 pm) | Coburg 2.10 (22) | def. by | Collingwood 18.18 (126) | Piranha Park | Report |
| Saturday, 30 April (2:05 pm) | Carlton 17.12 (114) | def. | North Melbourne 9.5 (59) | Ikon Park | Report |
| Sunday, 1 May (11:05 am) | Gold Coast 14.7 (91) | def. | Werribee 12.17 (89) | Austworld Centre Oval | Report |
| Sunday, 1 May (11:35 am) | Footscray 13.12 (90) | def. | Essendon 11.11 (77) | VU Whitten Oval | Report |
| Sunday, 1 May (12:00 pm) | Geelong 10.6 (66) | def. | Williamstown 6.18 (54) | GMHBA Stadium | Report |
| Sunday, 1 May (1:05 pm) | Sydney 8.7 (55) | def. by | Brisbane 17.12 (114) | SCG | Report |
| Sunday, 1 May (1:05 pm) | Northern Bullants 5.8 (38) | def. by | Greater Western Sydney 23.10 (148) | Preston City Oval | Report |
| Sunday, 1 May (2:05 pm) | Box Hill 11.6 (72) | def. by | Casey 10.19 (79) | Box Hill City Oval (crowd: 1,672) | Report |
| Sunday, 1 May (2:05 pm) | Sandringham 15.9 (99) | def. | Frankston 7.10 (52) | Trevor Barker Beach Oval | Report |
| | Bye; Port Melbourne, Richmond, Southport |

=== Round 7 ===
| | Round 7 |
| Saturday, 7 May (12:35 pm) | Brisbane 16.13 (109) | def. | Coburg 5.14 (44) | Moreton Bay Sports Complex |
| Saturday, 7 May (12:35 pm) | Port Melbourne 12.15 (87) | def. by | Richmond 19.10 (124) | ETU Stadium |
| Saturday, 7 May (1:05 am) | Werribee 4.8 (32) | def. by | Sydney 16.6 (102) | Avalon Airport Oval |
| Saturday, 7 May (2:05 am) | Sandringham 12.8 (80) | def. | Northern Bullants 6.14 (50) | Trevor Barker Beach Oval |
| Saturday, 7 May (2:05 pm) | Williamstown 12.9 (81) | def. | Gold Coast 9.17 (71) | Williamstown Cricket Ground |
| Saturday, 7 May (2:05 pm) | North Melbourne 8.10 (58) | def. by | Geelong 10.17 (77) | Arden Street Oval |
| Saturday, 7 May (7:05 pm) | Frankston 13.8 (86) | def. | Carlton 12.7 (79) | Skybus Stadium |
| Sunday, 8 May (12:35 pm) | Casey 13.11 (89) | def. | Southport 8.11 (59) | Casey Fields |
| Sunday, 8 May (2:10 pm) | Essendon 9.8 (62) | def. by | Box Hill 23.18 (156) | Windy Hill |
| | Bye; Collingwood, Footscray, Greater Western Sydney |
Frankston 3.7 (25) trailed Carlton 11.7 (73) by 48 points at three-quarter time, before kicking ten goals to one in the final quarter to win by seven points.

=== Round 8 ===
| | Round 8 |
| Saturday, 14 May (2:05 pm) | Collingwood 13.12 (90) | def. | Footscray 4.11 (35) | AIA Centre |
| Saturday, 14 May (7:35 pm) | Williamstown 3.16 (36) | def. by | Frankston 10.15 (75) | Williamstown Cricket Ground |
| Sunday, 15 May (12:35 pm) | Southport 12.13 (85) | def. | Greater Western Sydney 8.10 (58) | Austworld Centre Oval |
| Sunday, 15 May (12:00 pm) | North Melbourne 10.7 (67) | def. by | Casey 26.21 (177) | Arden Street Oval |
| Sunday, 15 May (12:00 pm) | Box Hill 15.16 (106) | def. | Richmond 10.13 (73) | Box Hill City Oval (crowd: 1,803) |
| Sunday, 15 May (1:05 pm) | Northern Bullants 9.10 (64) | def. by | Port Melbourne 12.8 (80) | Genis Steel Oval |
| | Bye; Brisbane, Carlton, Coburg, Essendon, Geelong, Gold Coast, Sandringham, Sydney, Werribee |
The Southport v Greater Western Sydney match was moved from Fankhauser Reserve to Austworld Centre Oval.

=== Round 9 ===
| | Round 9 |
| Saturday, 21 May (12:05 pm) | Footscray 11.6 (72) | def. by | Gold Coast 14.13 (97) | VU Whitten Oval |
| Saturday, 21 May (12:05 pm) | Port Melbourne 7.14 (56) | def. by | Southport 18.11 (119) | ETU Stadium |
| Saturday, 21 May (1:05 pm) | Coburg 13.7 (85) | def. by | Sydney 17.14 (116) | Piranha Park |
| Saturday, 21 May (1:35 pm) | Brisbane 6.8 (44) | def. | Williamstown 5.12 (42) | Moreton Bay Sports Complex |
| Saturday, 21 May (2:45 pm) | Richmond 10.19 (79) | def. | Essendon 6.10 (46) | Melbourne Cricket Ground |
| Sunday, 22 May (10:05 am) | Greater Western Sydney 8.6 (54) | def. by | Werribee 16.11 (107) | GIANTS Stadium |
| Sunday, 22 May (12:00 pm) | Carlton 9.11 (65) | def. by | Sandringham 9.15 (69) | Ikon Park |
| Sunday, 22 May (1:05 pm) | Northern Bullants 13.7 (85) | def. by | Geelong 15.8 (98) | Genis Steel Oval |
| | Bye; Box Hill, Casey, Collingwood, Frankston, North Melbourne |

=== Round 10 ===
| | Round 10 |
| Friday, 27 May (2:05 pm) | Sydney 9.19 (73) | def. | Richmond 10.9 (69) | Tramway Oval |
| Saturday, 28 May (12:05 pm) | Southport 16.12 (108) | def. | Brisbane 10.12 (72) | Fankhauser Reserve |
| Saturday, 28 May (2:05 pm) | Williamstown 8.7 (55) | def. by | Footscray 19.7 (121) | Williamstown Cricket Ground |
| Saturday, 28 May (3:05 pm) | Gold Coast 13.11 (89) | def. by | Box Hill 17.9 (111) | Austworld Centre Oval |
| Sunday, 29 May (11:35 am) | Essendon 12.14 (86) | def. | Coburg 13.7 (85) | Windy Hill |
| Sunday, 29 May (12:00 pm) | Werribee 16.13 (109) | def. | Collingwood 8.6 (54) | Avalon Airport Oval |
| Sunday, 29 May (12:05 pm) | Geelong 12.14 (86) | def. | Greater Western Sydney 8.8 (56) | GMHBA Stadium |
| Sunday, 29 May (1:05 pm) | Northern Bullants 13.6 (84) | def. by | Carlton 13.15 (93) | Genis Steel Oval |
| Sunday, 29 May (2:05 pm) | Frankston 6.12 (48) | def. by | Casey 10.6 (66) | Skybus Stadium |
| Sunday, 29 May (2:15 pm) | Sandringham 16.10 (106) | def. | North Melbourne 11.6 (72) | Trevor Barker Beach Oval |
| | Bye; Port Melbourne |
The Northern Bullants v Carlton game was held following a VAFA Women's game between Preston AFC and Parkside − the first time a VAFA club had played a curtain-raiser before a VFL game.

=== Round 11 ===
| | Round 11 |
| Friday, 3 June (3:35 pm) | Brisbane 13.15 (93) | def. | Northern Bullants 4.7 (31) | Moreton Bay Sports Complex |
| Friday, 3 June (4:05 pm) | Footscray 8.11 (59) | def. | Geelong 7.12 (54) | VU Whitten Oval |
| Saturday, 4 June (3:45 pm) | Casey 12.11 (83) | def. | Sydney 6.8 (44) | Melbourne Cricket Ground |
| Sunday, 5 June (1:05 pm) | North Melbourne 4.12 (36) | def. by | Box Hill 15.17 (107) | Arden Street Oval |
| Sunday, 5 June (11:05 am) | Collingwood 15.7 (97) | def. by | Gold Coast 18.9 (117) | AIA Centre |
| Sunday, 5 June (12:35 pm) | Coburg 11.7 (73) | def. | Frankston 6.14 (50) | Piranha Park |
| Sunday, 5 June (2:10 pm) | Port Melbourne 10.9 (69) | def. | Williamstown 6.14 (50) | ETU Stadium |
| | Bye; Carlton, Essendon, Greater Western Sydney, Richmond, Sandringham, Southport, Werribee |

=== Round 12 ===
| | Round 12 |
| Wednesday, 8 June (7:35 pm) | Richmond 8.6 (54) | def. by | Werribee 13.13 (91) | Swinburne Centre |
| Friday, 10 June (7:35 pm) | Frankston 9.2 (56) | def. by | Brisbane 9.8 (62) | Skybus Stadium |
| Saturday, 11 June (11:35 am) | Essendon 12.8 (80) | def. | Carlton 10.11 (71) | Windy Hill |
| Saturday, 11 June (12:05 pm) | Southport 16.13 (109) | def. | Sandringham 9.11 (65) | Fankhauser Reserve |
| Saturday, 11 June (1:35 pm) | Box Hill 15.12 (102) | def. | Port Melbourne 14.12 (96) | Box Hill City Oval (crowd: 2,278) |
| Sunday, 12 June (1:05 pm) | Greater Western Sydney 13.17 (95) | def. | North Melbourne 7.13 (55) | Blacktown ISP Oval |
| Sunday, 12 June (2:10 pm) | Casey 14.10 (94) | def. | Collingwood 6.6 (42) | Casey Fields |
| | Bye; Coburg, Footscray, Geelong, Gold Coast, Northern Bullants, Sydney, Williamstown |

=== Round 13 ===
| | Round 13 |
| Friday, 17 June (7:35 pm) | Carlton 11.9 (75) | def. | Footscray 8.8 (56) | Ikon Park |
| Saturday, 18 June (1:05 pm) | Werribee 16.16 (112) | def. | Geelong 7.7 (49) | Avalon Airport Oval |
| Saturday, 18 June (2:05 pm) | Sandringham 13.12 (90) | def. by | Essendon 15.14 (104) | Trevor Barker Beach Oval (crowd: 1,000) |
| Sunday, 19 June (11:35 am) | Gold Coast 18.11 (119) | def. | Greater Western Sydney 9.9 (63) | Metricon Stadium |
| Sunday, 19 June (11:35 am) | Sydney 24.17 (161) | def. | Williamstown 7.8 (50) | Blacktown ISP Oval |
| Sunday, 19 June (12:05 pm) | Northern Bullants 10.6 (66) | def. by | Southport 20.14 (134) | Genis Steel Oval |
| Sunday, 19 June (2:10 pm) | Coburg 7.10 (52) | def. by | Richmond 15.14 (104) | Piranha Park |
| | Bye; Box Hill, Brisbane, Casey, Collingwood, Frankston, North Melbourne, Port Melbourne |

=== Round 14 ===
| | Round 14 |
| Friday, 24 June (7:05 pm) | Port Melbourne 9.7 (61) | def. | Werribee 7.16 (58) | ETU Stadium |
| Saturday, 25 June (12:05 pm) | Southport 16.19 (115) | def. | Frankston 4.11 (35) | Fankhauser Reserve |
| Saturday, 25 June (1:05 pm) | Collingwood 11.6 (72) | def. by | Brisbane 14.13 (97) | AIA Centre |
| Saturday, 25 June (1:05 pm) | Footscray 14.10 (94) | def. | Box Hill 6.10 (46) | VU Whitten Oval |
| Saturday, 25 June (1:35 pm) | Gold Coast 9.13 (67) | def. by | Casey 21.17 (143) | Austworld Centre Oval |
| Saturday, 25 June (2:05 pm) | Sydney 13.12 (90) | def. | Sandringham 10.9 (69) | Tramway Oval |
| Saturday, 25 June (3:05 pm) | Williamstown 10.12 (72) | def. by | Essendon 16.14 (110) | Williamstown Cricket Ground |
| Saturday, 25 June (5:05 pm) | Carlton 7.13 (55) | def. | Coburg 7.9 (51) | Ikon Park |
| Sunday, 26 June (12:00 pm) | Geelong 13.11 (89) | def. by | Richmond 16.7 (103) | GMHBA Stadium |
| Sunday, 26 June (3:05 pm) | North Melbourne 13.12 (90) | def. | Northern Bullants 6.12 (48) | Arden Street Oval |
| | Bye; Greater Western Sydney |

=== Round 15 ===
| | Round 15 |
| Friday, 1 July (12:05 pm) | Brisbane 14.14 (98) | def. | Footscray 10.13 (73) | Moreton Bay Sports Complex |
| Saturday, 2 July (10:35 am) | Essendon 5.9 (39) | def. by | Sydney 14.14 (98) | Windy Hill |
| Saturday, 2 July (1:05 pm) | Casey 18.11 (119) | def. | Port Melbourne 8.13 (61) | Casey Fields |
| Saturday, 2 July (2:05 pm) | Werribee 15.15 (105) | def. | North Melbourne 9.4 (58) | Avalon Airport Oval |
| Saturday, 2 July (7:05 pm) | Frankston 18.10 (118) | def. | Geelong 8.14 (62) | Skybus Stadium |
| Sunday, 3 July (11:05 am) | Richmond 11.14 (80) | def. by | Collingwood 12.12 (84) | Swinburne Centre |
| Sunday, 3 July (11:35 am) | Greater Western Sydney 14.7 (91) | def. | Box Hill 7.18 (60) | GIANTS Stadium |
| Sunday, 3 July (2:15 pm) | Coburg 16.6 (102) | def. | Gold Coast 11.12 (78) | Piranha Park |
| Sunday, 3 July (2:15 pm) | Northern Bullants 9.8 (62) | def. by | Williamstown 13.9 (87) | Genis Steel Oval |
| | Bye; Carlton, Sandringham, Southport |

=== Round 16 ===
| | Round 16 |
| Friday, 8 July (7:05 pm) | Geelong 9.10 (64) | def. by | Casey 11.9 (75) | GMHBA Stadium |
| Saturday, 9 July (11:05 am) | Collingwood 9.12 (66) | def. | North Melbourne 7.6 (48) | AIA Centre |
| Saturday, 9 July (12:05 pm) | Box Hill 8.11 (59) | def. by | Southport 10.14 (74) | Box Hill City Oval (crowd: 857) |
| Saturday, 9 July (12:50 pm) | Gold Coast 12.8 (80) | def. | Frankston 10.16 (76) | Metricon Stadium |
| Saturday, 9 July (2:05 pm) | Werribee 15.21 (111) | def. | Coburg 7.7 (49) | Avalon Airport Oval |
| Saturday, 9 July (7:05 pm) | Port Melbourne 14.9 (93) | def. | Carlton 14.6 (90) | ETU Stadium |
| Sunday, 10 July (12:00 pm) | Sandringham 6.6 (42) | def. by | Footscray 13.18 (96) | Trevor Barker Beach Oval |
| Sunday, 10 July (1:05 pm) | Williamstown 9.10 (64) | def. by | Greater Western Sydney 11.16 (82) | Williamstown Cricket Ground |
| | Bye; Brisbane, Essendon, Northern Bullants, Richmond, Sydney |

=== Round 17 ===
| | Round 17 |
| Friday, 15 July (7:05 pm) | Southport 9.12 (66) | def. | Sydney 6.8 (48) | Fankhauser Reserve |
| Friday, 15 July (7:35 pm) | Frankston 13.13 (91) | def. | Northern Bullants 5.9 (39) | Skybus Stadium |
| Saturday, 16 July (12:05 pm) | Greater Western Sydney 8.10 (58) | def. by | Brisbane 9.13 (67) | Blacktown ISP Oval |
| Saturday, 16 July (1:05 pm) | Coburg 9.7 (61) | def. by | Sandringham 12.17 (89) | Piranha Park |
| Saturday, 16 July (2:05 pm) | North Melbourne 8.8 (56) | def. by | Richmond 8.10 (58) | Arden Street Oval |
| Saturday, 16 July (2:05 pm) | Box Hill 12.15 (87) | def. | Werribee 11.14 (80) | Box Hill City Oval (crowd: 684) |
| Saturday, 16 July (2:35 pm) | Carlton 10.10 (70) | def. | Geelong 9.5 (59) | Ikon Park |
| Sunday, 17 July (12:00 pm) | Port Melbourne 11.9 (75) | def. by | Collingwood 16.12 (108) | ETU Stadium |
| Sunday, 17 July (1:05 pm) | Essendon 11.12 (78) | def. by | Gold Coast 12.9 (81) | Windy Hill |
| | Bye; Casey, Footscray, Williamstown |
Brisbane had 1.3 (9) deducted from its original final score of 10.16 (76) against Greater Western Sydney, after being found to have had 19 players on the field for approximately five minutes during the final quarter in a post-match video review. They were deducted the nine points that were scored during the infringement, and fined $1,000.

=== Round 18 ===
| | Round 18 |
| Saturday, 23 July (10:05 am) | Sydney 12.17 (89) | def. | Frankston 6.9 (45) | Tramway Oval |
| Saturday, 23 July (2:05 pm) | Footscray 6.7 (43) | def. by | Casey 9.12 (66) | VU Whitten Oval |
| Saturday, 23 July (2:05 pm) | Richmond 10.14 (74) | def. | Williamstown 2.7 (19) | Swinburne Centre |
| Saturday, 23 July (6:05 pm) | Carlton 13.17 (95) | def. | Greater Western Sydney 9.4 (58) | Ikon Park |
| Sunday, 24 July (12:00 pm) | Northern Bullants 8.11 (59) | def. by | Box Hill 17.13 (115) | Genis Steel Oval |
| Sunday, 24 July (12:05 pm) | Southport 12.13 (85) | def. by | Essendon 13.9 (87) | Fankhauser Reserve |
| Sunday, 24 July (1:05 pm) | Brisbane 13.11 (89) | def. by | Gold Coast 13.13 (91) | Moreton Bay Sports Complex |
| Sunday, 24 July (1:05 pm) | Sandringham 10.12 (72) | def. by | Port Melbourne 19.9 (123) | Trevor Barker Beach Oval |
| | Bye; Coburg, Collingwood, Geelong, North Melbourne, Werribee |

=== Round 19 ===
| | Round 19 |
| Saturday, 30 July (10:35 am) | Collingwood 13.10 (88) | def. | Southport 6.14 (50) | Victoria Park | Report |
| Saturday, 30 July (1:05 pm) | Casey 18.17 (125) | def. | Northern Bullants 5.4 (34) | Casey Fields | Report |
| Saturday, 30 July (2:05 pm) | Werribee 9.4 (58) | def. by | Footscray 12.12 (84) | Avalon Airport Oval | Report |
| Saturday, 30 July (2:05 pm) | Williamstown 11.6 (72) | def. | Carlton 8.10 (58) | Williamstown Cricket Ground | Report |
| Saturday, 30 July (5:35 pm) | Sydney 10.17 (77) | def. | Greater Western Sydney 5.9 (39) | Sydney Cricket Ground | Report |
| Sunday, 31 July (9:05 am) | Gold Coast 19.14 (128) | def. | Port Melbourne 8.11 (59) | Metricon Stadium | Report |
| Sunday, 31 July (11:05 am) | Richmond 8.11 (59) | def. by | Brisbane 12.12 (84) | Swinburne Centre | Report |
| Sunday, 31 July (12:05 pm) | Essendon 11.8 (74) | def. | North Melbourne 6.9 (45) | Windy Hill | Report |
| Sunday, 31 July (12:35 pm) | Geelong 5.9 (39) | def. by | Coburg 12.11 (83) | Mars Stadium | Report |
| | Bye; Box Hill, Frankston, Sandringham |

=== Round 20 ===
| | Round 20 |
| Saturday, 6 August (10:35 am) | Greater Western Sydney 10.9 (69) | def. by | Essendon 15.9 (99) | GIANTS Stadium | Report |
| Saturday, 6 August (11:05 am) | Brisbane 12.6 (78) | def. | Werribee 9.12 (66) | Moreton Bay Sports Complex | Report |
| Saturday, 6 August (12:05 pm) | Footscray 24.14 (158) | def. | Coburg 5.5 (35) | VU Whitten Oval | Report |
| Saturday, 6 August (12:35 pm) | Collingwood 22.8 (140) | def. | Williamstown 9.8 (62) | AIA Centre | Report |
| Saturday, 6 August (1:00 pm) | Frankston 8.5 (53) | def. by | Box Hill 16.8 (104) | Skybus Stadium | Report |
| Sunday, 7 August (11:05 am) | North Melbourne 11.9 (75) | def. by | Sydney 13.17 (95) | Arden Street Oval | Report |
| Saturday, 7 August (1:05 pm) | Geelong 14.6 (90) | def. | Sandringham 13.10 (88) | GMHBA Stadium | Report |
| Sunday, 7 August (2:05 pm) | Northern Bullants 7.12 (54) | def. by | Richmond 21.10 (136) | Genis Steel Oval | Report |
| | Bye; Carlton, Casey, Gold Coast, Port Melbourne, Southport |

=== Round 21 ===
| | Round 21 |
| Saturday, 13 August (11:05 am) | Sandringham 13.10 (88) | def. by | Brisbane 17.11 (113) | Trevor Barker Beach Oval | Report |
| Saturday, 13 August (12:35 pm) | Coburg 9.10 (64) | def. by | North Melbourne 18.14 (122) | Piranha Park | Report |
| Saturday, 13 August (12:35 pm) | Gold Coast 14.10 (94) | def. | Southport 12.13 (85) | Metricon Stadium | Report |
| Saturday, 13 August (2:05 pm) | Box Hill 14.13 (97) | def. | Geelong 7.12 (54) | Box Hill City Oval (crowd: 1,215) | Report |
| Saturday, 13 August (2:00 pm) | Port Melbourne 12.9 (81) | def. | Frankston 11.11 (77) | ETU Stadium | Report |
| Sunday, 14 August (11:35 am) | Sydney 10.7 (67) | def. | Collingwood 9.10 (64) | Sydney Cricket Ground | Report |
| Sunday, 14 August (12:00 pm) | Casey 6.13 (49) | def. | Carlton 5.3 (33) | Casey Fields | Report |
| Sunday, 14 August (12:05 pm) | Essendon 10.14 (74) | def. | Werribee 10.9 (69) | Windy Hill | Report |
| | Bye; Footscray, Greater Western Sydney, Northern Bullants, Richmond, Williamstown |

=== Round 22 ===
| | Round 22 |
| Saturday, 20 August (10:30 am) | North Melbourne 11.11 (77) | def. by | Gold Coast 12.10 (82) | Arden Street Oval | Report |
| Saturday, 20 August (11:35 am) | Brisbane 10.11 (71) | def. | Casey 8.9 (57) | Moreton Bay Sports Complex | Report |
| Saturday, 20 August (11:35 am) | Southport 21.18 (144) | def. | Coburg 4.14 (38) | Fankhauser Reserve | Report |
| Saturday, 20 August (12:05 pm) | Greater Western Sydney 6.4 (40) | def. by | Footscray 23.18 (156) | Blacktown International Sports Park | Report |
| Saturday, 20 August (12:35 pm) | Box Hill 6.9 (45) | def. by | Sydney 15.12 (102) | Box Hill City Oval (crowd: 1,063) | Report |
| Saturday, 20 August (2:05 pm) | Richmond 9.18 (72) | def. | Frankston 10.9 (69) | Swinburne Centre | Report |
| Saturday, 20 August (2:05 pm) | Werribee 29.17 (191) | def. | Northern Bullants 0.10 (10) | Avalon Airport Oval | Report |
| Sunday, 21 August (11:45 am) | Carlton 7.9 (51) | def. | Collingwood 5.11 (41) | Melbourne Cricket Ground | Report |
| Sunday, 21 August (1:05 pm) | Geelong 10.14 (74) | def. | Port Melbourne 5.12 (42) | GMHBA Stadium | Report |
| Sunday, 21 August (1:35 pm) | Williamstown 10.10 (70) | def. by | Sandringham 17.8 (110) | Williamstown Cricket Ground | Report |
| | Bye; Essendon |
Casey lost its first game since July 2021, ending a 17 game winning streak and falling one win short of an unbeaten home-and-away season.; Werribee's 181 point victory over the Northern Bullants set a new record as its greatest winning margin in its first division history, and its second greatest winning margin of all time. The Bullants' loss set a new record as the heaviest in its history.

== Ladder ==
| Pos | Team | Pld | W | L | D | PF | PA | PP | Pts | Qualification |
|---|---|---|---|---|---|---|---|---|---|---|
| 1 | Casey (P) | 18 | 17 | 1 | 0 | 1730 | 1034 | 167.3 | 68 | Finals series |
| 2 | Brisbane (R) | 18 | 14 | 4 | 0 | 1556 | 1171 | 132.9 | 56 | Finals series |
| 3 | Southport | 18 | 13 | 5 | 0 | 1743 | 1231 | 141.6 | 52 | Finals series |
| 4 | Sydney (R) | 18 | 13 | 5 | 0 | 1560 | 1194 | 130.7 | 52 | Finals series |
| 5 | Gold Coast (R) | 18 | 12 | 6 | 0 | 1681 | 1621 | 103.7 | 48 | Finals series |
| 6 | Collingwood (R) | 18 | 11 | 7 | 0 | 1591 | 1326 | 120.0 | 44 | Finals series |
| 7 | Carlton (R) | 18 | 11 | 7 | 0 | 1416 | 1190 | 119.0 | 44 | Finals series |
| 8 | Box Hill | 18 | 11 | 7 | 0 | 1603 | 1358 | 118.0 | 44 | Finals series |
| 9 | Richmond (R) | 18 | 11 | 7 | 0 | 1481 | 1302 | 113.7 | 44 | |
| 10 | Werribee | 18 | 9 | 9 | 0 | 1578 | 1243 | 127.0 | 36 | |
| 11 | Footscray (R) | 18 | 9 | 9 | 0 | 1487 | 1262 | 117.8 | 36 | |
| 12 | Sandringham | 18 | 8 | 9 | 1 | 1442 | 1534 | 94.0 | 34 | |
| 13 | Greater Western Sydney (R) | 18 | 8 | 9 | 1 | 1302 | 1395 | 93.3 | 34 | |
| 14 | Geelong (R) | 18 | 8 | 10 | 0 | 1271 | 1444 | 88.0 | 32 | |
| 15 | Essendon (R) | 18 | 8 | 10 | 0 | 1454 | 1672 | 87.0 | 32 | |
| 16 | Port Melbourne | 18 | 7 | 11 | 0 | 1346 | 1589 | 84.7 | 28 | |
| 17 | Frankston | 18 | 6 | 12 | 0 | 1260 | 1363 | 92.4 | 24 | |
| 18 | North Melbourne (R) | 18 | 4 | 14 | 0 | 1217 | 1685 | 72.2 | 16 | |
| 19 | Coburg | 18 | 4 | 14 | 0 | 1071 | 1711 | 62.6 | 16 | |
| 20 | Williamstown | 18 | 3 | 15 | 0 | 1075 | 1629 | 66.0 | 12 | |
| 21 | Northern Bullants | 18 | 1 | 17 | 0 | 1036 | 1946 | 53.2 | 4 | |

Source: AFL
Rules for classification: 1) points; 2) percentage; 3) number of points for
(R) = Reserves

== Finals series ==
=== Qualifying and elimination finals ===
| | Qualifying finals |
| QF1: Saturday, August 27 (1:05 pm) | Casey 14.15 (99) | def. | Sydney 7.10 (52) | Casey Fields | Report |
| QF2: Saturday, August 27 (1:35 pm) | Brisbane Lions 5.8 (38) | def. by | Southport 12.15 (87) | Moreton Bay Sports Complex | Report |

| | Elimination finals |
| EF2: Sunday, August 28 (1:05 pm) | Collingwood 10.8 (68) | def. by | Carlton 15.10 (100) | Victoria Park | Report |
| EF1: Sunday, August 28 (6:05 pm) | Gold Coast 13.16 (94) | def. | Box Hill 10.11 (71) | Metricon Stadium | Report |

=== Semi-finals ===
| | Semi-finals |
| SF2: Saturday, 3 September (12:05 pm) | Brisbane Lions 11.6 (72) | def. | Carlton 8.12 (60) | Moreton Bay Sports Complex | Report |
| SF1: Sunday, 4 September (1:05 pm) | Sydney 12.15 (87) | def. by | Gold Coast 15.9 (99) | Blacktown ISP Oval | Report |

=== Preliminary finals ===
| | Preliminary finals |
| PF1: Saturday, 10 September (1:10 pm) | Casey 15.9 (99) | def. | Brisbane Lions 7.6 (48) | Casey Fields | Report |
| PF2: Sunday, 11 September (1:10 pm) | Southport 14.25 (109) | def. | Gold Coast 13.3 (81) | Fankhauser Reserve (crowd: 4,000) | Report |

=== Grand Final ===
2022 VFL Grand Final
Sunday 18 September (12:50 pm) | Casey | def. | Southport | Ikon Park (crowd: 4,500) | Stats; Report; Report
2.2 (14); 4.5 (29); 6.8 (44); 10.10 (70) | Q1; Q2; Q3; Final | 3.3 (21); 3.5 (23); 4.5 (29); 5.8 (38) | Umpires: Adair, Young, Rodger; Norm Goss Memorial Medal: Mitch White (Casey); Television broadcast: Seven Network
Melksham 4, Brown 2, Bedford, Laurie, Munro, Woewodin | Goals | Townsend 2, Johnson, King, Pescud
White, Munro, Melksham, Chandler, Tomlinson, Baker, Dunstan, Weideman | Best | Woodcock, Crossley, Boakye, Joyce, Clark
Nil | Injuries | Nil
Nil | Reports | Nil

== Awards ==
- The J. J. Liston Trophy was won by Tom Gribble (Werribee), who polled 30 votes. Gribble finished ahead of Boyd Woodcock and Jacob Dawson (both of Southport), who polled 22 votes. It was Gribble's second consecutive Liston Trophy, having won the 2019 Liston Trophy before the award's two-year hiatus.
- The Frosty Miller Medal was won by Chris Burgess (Gold Coast), who kicked 52 goals during the home-and-away season.
- The Fothergill–Round–Mitchell Medal was won by Ethan Phillips (Port Melbourne).
- The Coaches MVP award was won by Southport's Jacob Dawson.

=== Team of the Year ===
2022 VFL Team of the Year
| B: | Teia Miles (Williamstown) | Ethan Phillips (Port Melbourne) | Marty Hore (North Melbourne) |
| HB: | Will Gould (Sydney) | Jack Maibaum (Coburg) | Taylin Duman (Frankston) |
| C: | Kye Declase (Werribee) | Tom Gribble (Werribee) | Lewis Taylor (Sydney) |
| HF: | Boyd Woodcock (Southport) | Joel Amartey (Sydney) | Shaun Mannagh (Werribee) |
| F: | Ben Cavarra (c) (Box Hill) | Chris Burgess (Gold Coast) | Fergus Greene (Box Hill) |
| Foll: | Ned Moyle (Gold Coast) | Luke Dunstan (Casey) | Jacob Dawson (Gold Coast) |
| Int: | Tom Downie (Williamstown) | Will Fordham (Frankston) | Will Hayes (Carlton) |
| Int: | Rhys Mathieson (Brisbane) | Lachlan Sullivan (Footscray) | Mitch White (Casey) |
| Coach: | Mark Corrigan (Casey) | | |

== See also ==
- List of VFA/VFL premiers
- Victorian Football League
- Australian Football League
- 2022 AFL season
- 2022 VFL Women's season
