= Tom Gribble =

Australian rules footballer (born 1994)

Personal information
- Full name: Thomas Gribble
- Born: 17 October 1994 (age 32)
- Original teams: Geelong West St Peters (GFL); Geelong Falcons (TAC Cup)
- Height: 183 cm (6 ft 0 in)
- Weight: 83 kg (183 lb)

Playing career
Years	Club	Games (Goals)
2013	Geelong reserves	4 (0)
2014–2023	Werribee	137 (60)
Total		141 (60)

Representative team honours
Years	Team	Games (Goals)
2013	AFL Vic Country U19s	1 (0)

Career highlights
- Werribee co-captain: 2022; 2x J. J. Liston Trophy: 2019, 2022; 2x Bruce Montgomery Trophy: 2019, 2022; 5x VFL Team of the Year: 2014, 2018, 2019, 2022, 2023; Geelong West St Peters best-and-fairest: 2013

Thomas Gribble (born 17 October 1994) is an Australian rules footballer who plays for the Geelong Amateurs in the Bellarine Football Netball League (BFNL). He previously played for Geelong's reserves team and Werribee in the Victorian Football League (VFL), where he was a two-time winner of the J. J. Liston Trophy and five-time Team of the Year member.

== Career ==
Gribble played junior football with the Geelong West St Peters Football Club in the Geelong Football League (GFL) and the Geelong Falcons in the TAC Cup. At the age of 17, he recorded 40 disposals in the Falcons' elimination final victory over the Murray Bushrangers. Although he spoke to six Australian Football League (AFL) clubs ahead of the 2012 draft, he was not selected by any AFL club.

Having missed out on being drafted to the AFL, Gribble continued playing for Geelong West St Peters in the GFL. He was selected by Geelong's reserves team to make his Victorian Football League (VFL) debut as the 23rd player in round 4 of the 2013 season, where he had 33 disposals against Frankston. In July 2013, Gribble played for AFL Victoria Country in an under-19s representative match against the Victorian Amateur Football Association (VAFA) and was named among the best players in a four-point loss. He won Geelong West St Peters' best-and-fairest award in 2013.

After four matches for Geelong in the VFL, Gribble moved to the Werribee Football Club for the 2014 season. He made his debut for the club in round 1 against Box Hill and played 18 senior matches during the season, including two finals matches, finishing fourth in Werribee's best-and-fairest count and making the 2014 VFL Team of the Year. He did not play any matches in 2015 because of a stress fracture in his leg.

In 2016, Gribble played three Development League matches before returning to Werribee's senior team. He recorded 44 disposals in round 17 during a 63-point victory over the Northern Blues. Following the end of North Melbourne's reserves affiliation with Werribee, Gribble re-signed with the club in 2018, making the VFL Team of the Year the same season. He won the J. J. Liston Trophy in 2019, having averaged 30 disposals and seven clearances during the season, along with making the Team of the Year and being awarded the Bruce Montgomery Trophy as Werribee's best-and-fairest player. Gribble did not play any matches in 2020 due to the impact of the COVID-19 pandemic, before finishing sixth in Werribee's best-and-fairest count the following year in 2021.

On 10 March 2022, Gribble was appointed Werribee co-captain, serving alongside Dom Brew. He led the VFL for total disposals during the 2022 season with 597, averaging a career-high 33.2 disposals per match. Gribble received 30 votes to win the J. J. Liston Trophy for a second time, becoming the first Werribee player to win the award on multiple occasions, in addition to winning a second Bruce Montgomery Trophy and being named in the 2022 VFL Team of the Year. He stepped down from the club's leadership group before the start of the 2023 season.

Gribble played every possible VFL match from the start of 2017 until round 7 of the 2023 season, when he was a late out on the morning of Werribee's match against Essendon due to illness. He was named in the 2023 VFL Team of the Year and finished second in the Liston Trophy count after averaging 31 disposals for the season. Gribble was one of Werribee's best players in the 2023 grand final, recording 29 disposals in a 19-point loss to Gold Coast. At the end of the year, he retired from the VFL to join the Geelong Amateurs in the Bellarine Football Netball League (BFNL) as a playing assistant coach.

== Statistics ==
Legend
G	Goals	K	Kicks	D	Disposals	T	Tackles
B	Behinds	H	Handballs	M	Marks

Season	Team	No.	Games	Totals							Averages (per game)							Votes
Season	Team	No.	Games	G	B	K	H	D	M	T	G	B	K	H	D	M	T	Votes
2013	Geelong	67	4	0							0.0							0
2014	Werribee	13	18	11							0.6							0
2015	Werribee	13	0	—	—	—	—	—	—	—	—	—	—	—	—	—	—	0
2016	Werribee	4	15	5							0.3							
2017	Werribee	4	18	8							0.4							
2018	Werribee	4	18	12							0.6							4
2019	Werribee	4	20	9							0.5							25
2021	Werribee	4	9	1	7	137	128	265	46	41	0.1	0.8	15.2	14.2	29.4	5.1	4.6	— (Note: The J. J. Liston Trophy was not awarded in 2021 because the season was curtailed due to the impact of the COVID-19 pandemic.)
2022	Werribee	4	18	9	9	306	291	597	73	77	0.5	0.5	17.0	16.2	33.2	4.1	4.3	30
2023	Werribee	4	20	5	8	295	323	618	105	77	0.3	0.4	14.8	16.2	30.9	5.3	3.9	21
Career			141	60							0.3							

== Personal life ==
Gribble was diagnosed with diabetes at the age of nine. His father, Andrew Gribble, was selected by Geelong with the 104th pick in the 1988 draft but did not play a senior VFL/AFL match, before later winning club best-and-fairest awards at South Barwon and Geelong West St Peters in 1993 and 1994 respectively. Andrew Gribble died on 29 November 2020 at the age of 53.

In 2021, Gribble and his brother – Noah Gribble – became the first brothers to play for Werribee in the same match since Hugh and Elijah Wales in 2015.
