= 2018 VFL season =

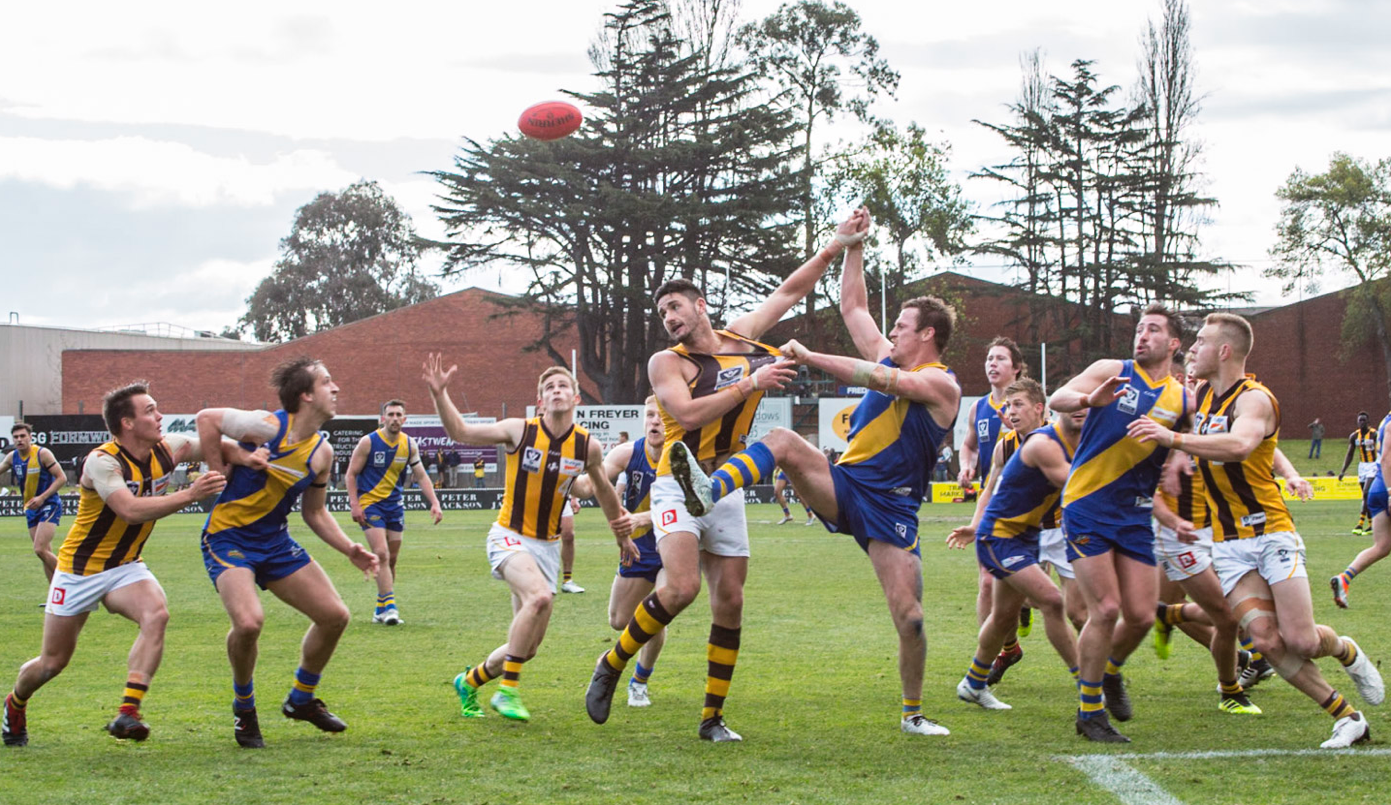
- Williamstown vs Box Hill at North Port Oval in the 2nd Preliminary Final
- Teams: 15
- Premiers: Box Hill; 3rd premiership
- Minor premiers: Richmond reserves 1st minor premiership
- J. J. Liston Trophy: Michael Gibbons (Williamstown); Anthony Miles (Richmond reserves)
- Frosty Miller Medallist: Nick Larkey (North Melbourne reserves)

The 2018 VFL season was the 137th season of the Victorian Football League (VFL), a second-tier Australian rules football competition played in the state of Victoria. The competition ran between April 2018 and September 2018.

The premiership was won by the Box Hill Hawks Football Club, after it defeated Casey in the Grand Final on 23 September 2018 by 10 points.

== League membership ==
There were several changes to the league's membership and alignments between the 2017 and 2018 seasons, with North Melbourne reserves joining the competition, Frankston rejoining, and North Ballarat departing, resulting in a total membership of 15.

The Frankston Football Club returned to the competition after a one-year hiatus. AFL Victoria had terminated the club's licence at the end of the 2016 season due to its unviable financial position, which saw it in administration owing more than $1,500,000. The club embarked on a campaign during 2017 to assure its long-term viability, which included signing up 1200 members and working to improve its relationship with the local leagues as a pathway for Mornington Peninsula footballers into state football. The club then applied for and was re-granted its VFL licence for the 2018 season.

At the end of 2017, the ten-year reserves affiliation between the AFL's North Melbourne Football Club and the VFL's Werribee Football Club came to an end. North Melbourne entered its reserves team in the VFL seniors, the first time that team had competed in the competition. Werribee continued to field a stand-alone senior team in the VFL. The teams continued to share a home ground, with all Werribee home games and most North Melbourne home games played at the newly upgraded Avalon Airport Oval in Werribee until North Melbourne's traditional home at Arden Street Oval was brought to VFL standard in mid-2019.

After the 2017 home-and-away season had concluded, AFL Victoria suspended North Ballarat's playing licence. The club had endured two years of off-field instability since the termination of its partial reserves affiliation with AFL club North Melbourne. This had included: multiple changes of personnel at executive and board level; the compulsory acquisition of its home ground Eureka Stadium in early 2017; and difficulties in governance associated with the club's attentions being divided between its VFL team and the North Ballarat City team it operated in the Ballarat Football League. AFL Victoria determined that the club's governance had deteriorated to the point that it no longer met the minimum requirements for a VFL licence. The club's poor on-field performances – a combined win–loss record in 2016 and 2017 of 4–32 – was also a factor. The suspension brought to an end North Ballarat's 22-year association with the VFL, which included three premierships. AFL Victoria had an interest in maintaining an ongoing VFL presence in Ballarat, and there were ongoing discussions between AFL Victoria and club's board on a model for re-entry of the club as a new or rebranded Ballarat team in the competition, but no agreement was reached.

Another significant change to the VFL's structure prior to 2018 was the abolition of the Development League competition, ending 90 years of VFA/VFL seconds/reserve grade football dating back to the 1920s. Under the new arrangement, VFL-listed players from all clubs will play for local affiliated suburban competitions when not playing senior football for their club – the structure which was already in place for the clubs with no Development League team. The decision was made for a number of reasons, including rising costs, difficulties with scheduling, shortages of manpower within the clubs, and to improve relationships with suburban football. The clubs fielding Development League teams generally opposed the change, concerned that the pathway between suburban or under-18s football and the VFL would be affected. In particular, the clubs involved in affiliations with AFL clubs, where most of the senior players on any given week are AFL-listed reserves players, were concerned that they would be reduced to having almost no players of their own, reducing their identity or utility as football clubs.

== Ladder ==
Pos	Team	Pld	W	L	D	PF	PA	PP	Pts	Qualification
1	Richmond	18	14	4	0	1911	1198	159.5	56	Finals series
2	Casey Demons	18	14	4	0	1593	1128	141.2	56	Finals series
3	Geelong	18	13	5	0	1574	1074	146.6	52	Finals series
4	Williamstown	18	13	5	0	1496	1171	127.8	52	Finals series
5	Collingwood	18	12	6	0	1628	1220	133.4	48	Finals series
6	Box Hill (P)	18	12	6	0	1634	1288	126.9	48	Finals series
7	Port Melbourne	18	10	8	0	1536	1436	107.0	40	Finals series
8	Essendon	18	9	9	0	1502	1237	121.4	36	Finals series
9	Footscray	18	8	10	0	1378	1442	95.6	32	
10	North Melbourne	18	8	10	0	1436	1696	84.7	32	
11	Werribee	18	7	11	0	1488	1680	88.6	28	
12	Northern Blues	18	6	12	0	1256	1643	76.4	24	
13	Sandringham	18	5	12	1	1317	1593	82.7	22	
14	Frankston	18	2	16	0	964	2068	46.6	8	
15	Coburg	18	1	16	1	1116	1955	57.1	6	

Updated to match(es) played on 23 August 2018. Source: SportsTG
Rules for classification: 1) points; 2) percentage; 3) number of points for.

== Finals ==
=== Qualifying and Elimination Finals ===
	Qualifying Finals
Saturday 1 September (2:10 pm)	Casey 20.9 (129)	def.	Geelong 4.14 (38)	Casey Fields
Saturday 1 September (7:10 pm)	Richmond 8.7 (55)	def. by	Williamstown 11.14 (80)	Swinburne Centre

	Elimination Finals
Saturday 1 September (2:10 pm)	Box Hill 13.18 (96) (a.e.t.)	def.	Port Melbourne 13.7 (85)	Stannards Stadium
Sunday 2 September (2:10 pm)	Collingwood 11.14 (80)	def. by	Essendon 18.6 (114)	Stannards Stadium
The elimination final between Box Hill and Port Melbourne was decided in extra time. Box Hill 11.17 (83) was level with Port Melbourne 13.5 (83) after four quarters, and Box Hill kicked two goals during the extra time periods to win the game by eleven points.

=== Semi-finals ===
	Semi-finals
Saturday 8 September (2:10 pm)	Richmond 9.10 (64)	def. by	Essendon 10.9 (69)	Stannards Stadium
Sunday 9 September (2:10 pm)	Geelong 8.13 (61)	def. by	Box Hill 13.12 (90)	Stannards Stadium

=== Preliminary Finals ===
	Preliminary Finals
Saturday 15 September (2:10 pm)	Casey 10.13 (73)	def.	Essendon 10.5 (65)	Stannards Stadium
Sunday 16 September (2:10 pm)	Williamstown 13.12 (90)	def. by	Box Hill 13.13 (91)	Stannards Stadium

=== Grand Final ===
2018 VFL Grand Final
Sunday 23 September (3:20 pm)	Casey	def. by	Box Hill	Marvel Stadium (crowd: 12,884)
4.4 (28); 5.9 (39); 8.11 (59); 8.14 (62)	Q1; Q2; Q3; Final	1.1 (7); 3.4 (22); 7.8 (50); 10.12 (72)	Umpires: Howorth, Rebeschini & Talbot; Norm Goss Memorial Medal: David Mirra (Box Hill); Television broadcast: Seven Network
Bugg, Kennedy Harris, Lefau, Lockhart, Machaya, Pedersen, Scott, Smith	Goals	D. Moore 3; Hanrahan, Jones, Lovell, A. Moore, O'Brien, O'Rourke, Ross
Box Hill won the premiership after finishing sixth on the ladder, the first occasion in VFA/VFL history that the eventual premier did not finish in one of the top four positions on the ladder.

== Awards ==
- The J. J. Liston Trophy was won jointly by Michael Gibbons (Williamstown) and Anthony Miles (Richmond reserves), who each polled 19 votes. It was Gibbons' second Liston Trophy, having also won the award in 2016. Gibbons and Miles finished ahead of Sam Collins (Werribee) and Alex Woodward (Collingwood reserves), who finished equal-third on 16 votes apiece.
- The Frosty Miller Medal was won by Nick Larkey (North Melbourne reserves), who kicked 41 goals during the home-and-away season.
- The Fothergill–Round–Mitchell Medal was won by Josh Corbett (Werribee).

=== Team of the Year ===
2018 VFL Team of the Year
B:	Marty Hore (Collingwood)	Lucas Cook (Port Melbourne)	James Tsitas (Geelong)
HB:	Brett Bewley (Williamstown)	Sam Collins (Werribee)	Aaron Heppell (Essendon)
C:	Nick Hind (Essendon)	Michael Gibbons (Williamstown)	Will Hayes (Footscray)
HF:	Eli Templeton (Port Melbourne)	Jesse Palmer (Northern Blues)	Corey Rich (Frankston)
F:	Ben Cavarra (Williamstown)	Jordan Lisle (Port Melbourne)	Danny Younan (Essendon)
Foll:	Nick Meese (Williamstown)	Tom Atkins (Geelong)	Tom Gribble (Werribee)
Int:	Marcus Lentini (Coburg)	Corey Wagner (Casey)	Brede Seccull (Sandringham)
Int:	Angus Monfries (Footscray)	Jay Lockhart (Casey)	Tom O'Sullivan (Port Melbourne)
Coach:	Jade Rawlings (Casey)		

== Notable events ==
- During the season, a provisional license was granted to AFL Tasmania to allow for the return of a Tasmanian team to the VFL commencing as early as 2021. Tasmania had not been represented in the VFL since the departure of the Tasmanian Devils Football Club at the end of 2008.
- In Round 11, Sandringham 0.9 (9) lost to Williamstown 11.11 (77) in a game at Williamstown affected by torrential rain and sheets of stagnant water on the ground. It was the lowest score in Sandringham's history, and the first time a team had been held goalless in a VFA/VFL match since Northcote in 1919. Eight of Williamstown's eleven goals came in the final quarter. Three rounds later, the North Melbourne reserves 0.7 (7) were also held goalless in rain-affected match, losing to Casey 5.14 (44), for the lowest score in its brief VFL history.
- In Round 14, Coburg 12.7 (79) drew Sandringham 11.13 (79), in a match that ended in unusual circumstances. Sandringham forward Doulton Langlands had been awarded a free kick from 45 metres out just as the siren sounded, and his initial kick failed to make the distance. However, umpire Andrew Mitchell awarded a 50-metre penalty as one of the Coburg trainers ran through the mark as Langlands was taking his kick. The resulting penalty meant that Langlands retook his shot from the goal square, from which he kicked the goal and denied Coburg its first win for the season.
- In three late season matches (Coburg vs Werribee in Round 18, Northern vs Coburg in Round 19, and Northern vs Sandringham in Round 20), AFL Victoria trialled two rule changes it was considering for introduction nationally: the "6–6–6 rule", requiring six players from each team to be standing inside each 50m arc at a centre bounce; and the extension of the goal square from 9m to 18m. The 6–6–6 rule was adopted in 2019, while the extended goal square was not.
- In the qualifying Final between Richmond and Williamstown, the floodlights at Swinburne Centre went out due to overheating globes with around five minutes remaining in the third quarter. The match was delayed for twenty minutes, with three-quarter time taken immediately and the remaining five minutes added to the playing time in the final quarter.
- The Fothergill–Round Medal, awarded to the most promising player younger than 23, was renamed the Fothergill–Round–Mitchell Medal from this season onwards. The medal was originally named in honour of Williamstown's Des Fothergill and Barry Round, who had each won a J. J. Liston Trophy (or its predecessor) as well as the VFL/AFL's Brownlow Medal; so the name of Box Hill's Sam Mitchell, who had achieved the same feat in the years since the award was created, was added.

== See also ==
- List of VFA/VFL premiers
- Australian rules football
- Victorian Football League
- Australian Football League
- 2018 AFL season
