= Ned Moyle =

Personal information
- Born: February 15, 2002 (age 24)
- Original teams: Kew Rovers (YJFL); Oakleigh Chargers (Talent League); Collingwood (VFL)
- Draft: No. 5, 2021 mid-season rookie draft
- Debut: Round 4, 2023, Gold Coast vs. St Kilda, at Marvel Stadium
- Height: 206 cm (6 ft 9 in)
- Position: Ruck

Club information
- Current club: Gold Coast
- Number: 23

Playing career^{1}
Years	Club	Games (Goals)
2021–	Gold Coast	27 (6)
- ^{1} Playing statistics correct to the end of round 22, 2026.

Career highlights
- VFL premiership player: 2023

Ned Moyle (born 15 February 2002) is an Australian rules footballer who plays for the Gold Coast Suns in the Australian Football League (AFL).

== Junior career ==
Moyle played local football for the Kew Rovers in the Yarra Junior Football League. He played school football for Xavier College.

Moyle played for the Oakleigh Chargers in the Talent League. He averaged 11.5 disposals and 26.5 hitouts per game.

Prior to being drafted, Moyle played for Collingwood in the VFL.

== AFL career ==
Moyle was selected by Gold Coast with pick 5 of the 2021 mid-season rookie draft. In 2022, Moyle signed a two-year contract extension to the end of 2024.

In round 4 of the 2023 AFL season, after first-choice ruckman Jarrod Witts withdrew from the match due to soreness, Moyle made his debut.

In 2024, Moyle signed a four-year contract extension to the end of 2028.

== Statistics ==
Updated to the end of round 22, 2026.

Legend
G	Goals	K	Kicks	D	Disposals	T	Tackles
B	Behinds	H	Handballs	M	Marks	H/O	Hit-outs

Season	Team	No.	Games	Totals								Averages (per game)								Votes
Season	Team	No.	Games	G	B	K	H	D	M	T	H/O	G	B	K	H	D	M	T	H/O	Votes
2021	Gold Coast	49	0	—	—	—	—	—	—	—	—	—	—	—	—	—	—	—	—	0
2022	Gold Coast	49	0	—	—	—	—	—	—	—	—	—	—	—	—	—	—	—	—	0
2023	Gold Coast	49	2	0	0	6	3	9	0	10	53	0.0	0.0	3.0	1.5	4.5	0.0	5.0	26.5	0
2024	Gold Coast	49	8	1	0	51	57	108	21	23	227	0.1	0.0	6.4	7.1	13.5	2.6	2.9	28.4	0
2025	Gold Coast	21	3	1	1	7	9	16	6	6	63	0.3	0.3	2.3	3.0	5.3	2.0	2.0	21.0	0
2026	Gold Coast	23	14	4	2	65	74	139	26	24	482	0.3	0.1	4.6	5.3	9.9	1.9	1.7	34.4	0
Career			27	6	3	129	143	272	53	63	825	0.2	0.1	4.8	5.3	10.1	2.0	2.3	30.6	0
