= Boyd Woodcock =

Australian rules footballer (born 2000)

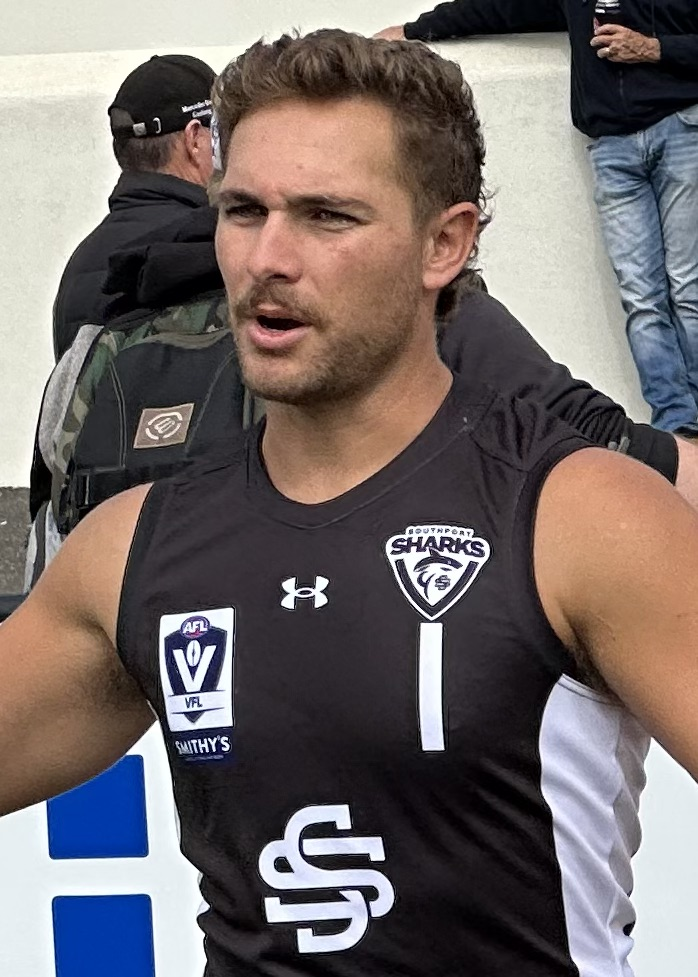
- Woodcock playing for Southport in 2026

Personal information
- Full name: Boyd Liam Woodcock
- Born: 5 March 2000 (age 26)
- Original team: North Adelaide (SANFL)
- Draft: No. 76, 2018 national draft No. 32, 2019 rookie draft
- Height: 179 cm (5 ft 10 in)
- Weight: 76 kg (168 lb)
- Position: Forward/Midfielder

Playing career^{1}
Years	Club	Games (Goals)
2019-2021	Port Adelaide	12 (8)
- ^{1} Playing statistics correct to the end of 2020.

Career highlights
- SANFL Premiership player (2018); 2x J. J. Liston Trophy runner-up: 2022, 2023; 3 x VFL Team Of The Year: 2022, 2023, 2024; Southport best and fairest: 2024; Alex Aurrichio Medal: 2022, 2023

Boyd Liam Woodcock (born 5 March 2000) is an Australian rules footballer who currently plays for the Southport Sharks in the Victorian Football League (VFL). He previously played for Port Adelaide in the Australian Football League (AFL).

== Career ==
Woodcock played in North Adelaide's SANFL premiership side in 2018 kicking 3 goals and having 17 disposals at 18 years old.

He made his AFL debut in Round 10 of the 2020 AFL season against the Western Bulldogs at Adelaide Oval, where he was denied his first AFL goal due to a score review ruling his goal had hit the post. However, he kicked his debut goal the following round against Richmond at Adelaide Oval. Woodcock was delisted at the end of the 2021 season.

Woodcock played for Southport in the club's six-point 2024 VFL grand final loss to Werribee. He won the club's best and fairest award for the 2024 season.
