= Tramway Oval =

Sports ground in Sydney, New South Wales

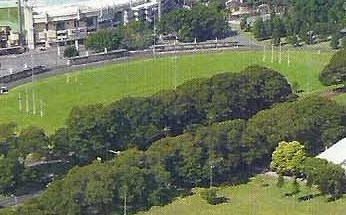
- Tramway Oval in May 2014
- Interactive map of Tramway Oval
- Location: Moore Park, Sydney, New South Wales
- Coordinates: 33.8916944°S 151.2219722°E
- Operator: Centennial Park and Moore Park Trust
- Capacity: 1,000
- Surface: Grass

Tenant
- Sydney Swans (training ground)

Tramway Oval (also known as Lakeside Oval) is a multi-purpose public sports ground located in Moore Park, a suburb of Sydney, New South Wales. The oval is a premium sports facility in the Centennial Parklands, located immediately west of the Sydney Cricket Ground (SCG) and south of Kippax Lake on an approximately semicircular grassy wedge between Driver Avenue and the CBD and South East Light Rail which runs along Anzac Parade.

Tramway Oval is primarily used as a training ground for professional clubs who use the nearby SCG and Sydney Football Stadium, particularly the Sydney Swans Australian rules football club (including its junior academy) and the New South Wales Waratahs rugby union club. Spectator facilities at the venue are minimal.

The construction of the light rail along Anzac Parade in the mid-2010s reduced the width of the oval to only 101m wide, well short of the minimum width for an Australian rules football oval. A redevelopment of the surface finishing in 2019 saw its size increased to match that of Melbourne's Docklands Stadium, and made the venue suitable for state-level Australian rules football. The Sydney Swans reserves team now plays its competitive matches in the Victorian Football League (and previously in the North East Australian Football League) on the ground.
