= 2019 VFL season =

138th season of the Victorian Football League

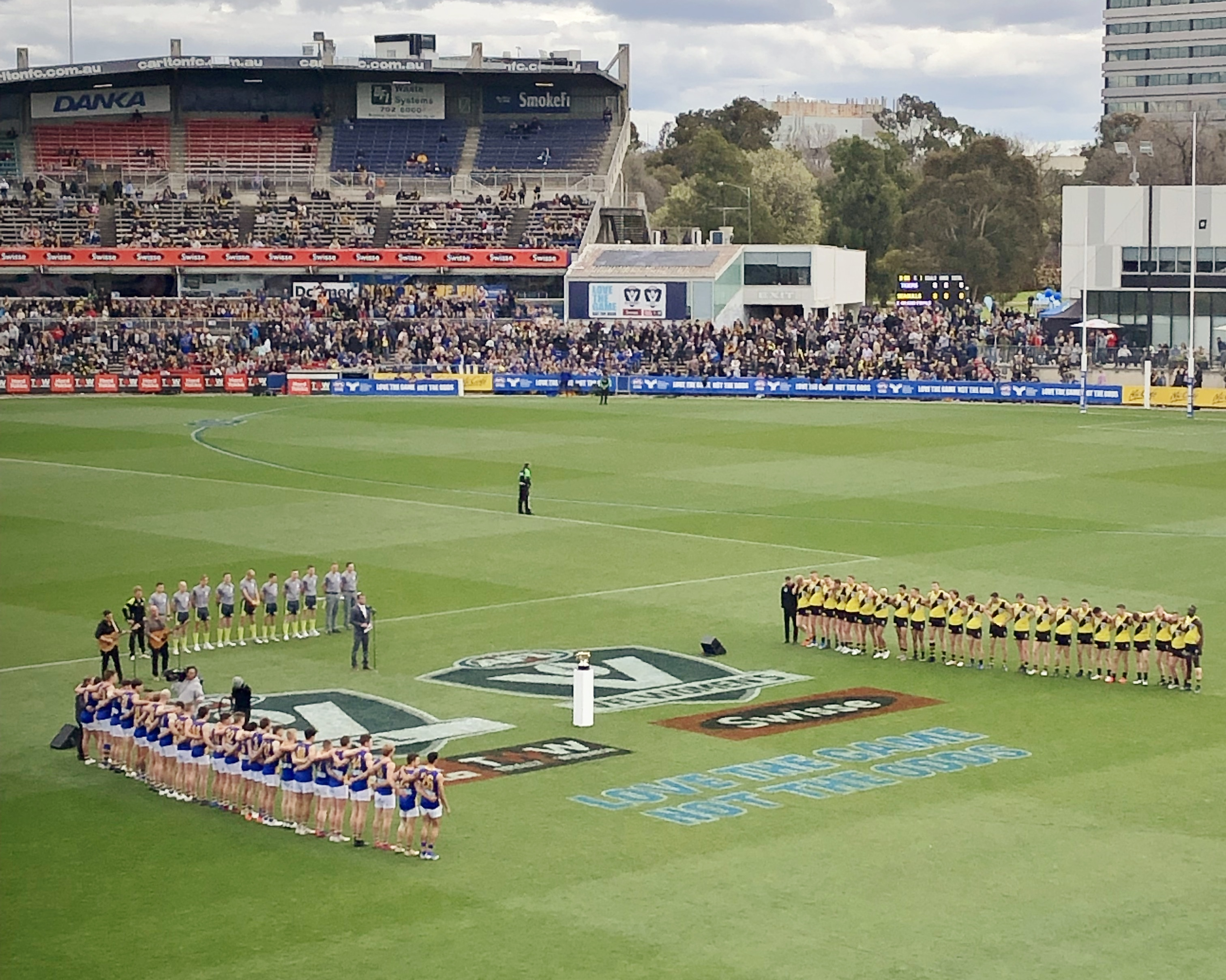
- Richmond and Williamstown line up for the national anthem at the 2019 VFL Grand Final
- Date: 5 April – 22 September 2019
- Teams: 15
- Premiers: Richmond reserves 1st premiership
- Minor premiers: Richmond reserves 2nd minor premiership
- J. J. Liston Trophy: Tom Gribble (Werribee – 25 votes)
- Frosty Miller Medallist: Jordan Lisle (Port Melbourne – 40 goals)

The 2019 VFL season was the 138th season of the Victorian Football League (VFL), a second-tier Australian rules football competition played in the state of Victoria. The season began on 5 April and concluded on 22 September, comprising an 18-match home-and-away season over 21 rounds, followed by a four-week finals series.

Richmond reserves won the premiership for the first time, defeating Williamstown by three points in the 2019 VFL Grand Final. It was Richmond's third overall VFA/VFL premiership, following premierships won by its senior team in 1902 and 1905.

== Ladder ==
Pos	Team	Pld	W	L	D	PF	PA	PP	Pts	Qualification
1	Richmond (P)	18	16	2	0	1550	1144	135.5	64	Finals series
2	Footscray	18	14	3	1	1651	1120	147.4	58	Finals series
3	Williamstown	18	13	4	1	1442	1183	121.9	54	Finals series
4	Essendon	18	12	6	0	1627	1222	133.1	48	Finals series
5	Werribee	18	11	7	0	1579	1236	127.8	44	Finals series
6	Geelong	18	11	7	0	1487	1215	122.4	44	Finals series
7	Port Melbourne	18	10	7	1	1552	1399	110.9	42	Finals series
8	Box Hill	18	9	8	1	1413	1268	111.4	38	Finals series
9	Casey	18	9	9	0	1211	1183	102.4	36	
10	Northern Blues	18	7	11	0	1288	1500	85.9	28	
11	Collingwood	18	7	11	0	1090	1298	84.0	28	
12	Sandringham	18	6	12	0	1163	1488	78.2	24	
13	North Melbourne	18	5	13	0	1235	1777	69.5	20	
14	Coburg	18	2	16	0	1204	1719	70.0	8	
15	Frankston	18	1	17	0	1002	1742	57.5	4	

Rules for classification: 1) points; 2) percentage; 3) number of points for.

== Finals ==
=== Qualifying and Elimination finals ===
	Qualifying finals
Saturday, 31 August (2:10 pm)	Richmond 15.10 (100)	def.	Essendon 15.8 (98)	Swinburne Centre
Saturday, 31 August (1:00 pm)	Footscray 9.10 (64)	def. by	Williamstown 11.11 (77)	VU Whitten Oval

	Elimination finals
Sunday, 1 September (2:10 pm)	Werribee 12.9 (81)	def.	Box Hill 5.10 (40)	Adcon Stadium
Saturday, 31 August (2:10 pm)	Geelong 6.5 (41)	def. by	Port Melbourne 11.11 (77)	Adcon Stadium

=== Semi-finals ===
	First semi-final
Sunday, 8 September (2:10 pm)	Essendon 8.7 (55)	def.	Werribee 7.10 (52)	Adcon Stadium

	Second semi-final
Saturday, 7 September (11:40 am)	Footscray 4.17 (41)	def. by	Port Melbourne 8.8 (56)	Adcon Stadium

=== Preliminary finals ===
	First preliminary final
Saturday, 14 September (2:10 pm)	Richmond 14.15 (99)	def.	Port Melbourne 10.13 (73)	Adcon Stadium

	Second preliminary final
Sunday, 15 September (2:10 pm)	Williamstown 14.12 (96)	def.	Essendon 9.16 (70)	Adcon Stadium

=== Grand Final ===
2019 VFL Grand Final
Sunday, 22 September (2:10 pm)	Richmond	v	Williamstown	Ikon Park (crowd: 13,165)	Report
4.4 (28); 4.8 (32); 5.10 (40); 8.10 (58)	Q1; Q2; Q3; Final	0.0 (0); 2.4 (16); 3.8 (26); 7.13 (55)	Umpires: Pell, Rebeschini, Rodger, Porter; Norm Goss Memorial Medal: Marlion Pickett (Richmond); Television broadcast: Seven Network
Townsend 2, Collier-Dawkins 2, Pickett, Ballard, Naish, Markov	Goals	Master, Myers, Rodda, Pickess, Kennedy, Wheeler, Ottavi
Pickett, Morris, Eggmolesse-Smith, Collier-Dawkins, Balta	Best	Hibberd, Dorgan, Wheeler, Meese

== Awards ==
- The J. J. Liston Trophy was won by Tom Gribble (Werribee), who polled 25 votes. Gribble finished ahead of Rhylee West (Footscray), who polled 17 votes, and Tom Campbell (North Melbourne), who polled 15 votes.
- The Frosty Miller Medal was won by Jordan Lisle (Port Melbourne), who kicked 40 goals during the home-and-away season, and 46 goals overall. It was Lisle's third medal, having previously won in 2017 and 2015.
- The Fothergill–Round–Mitchell Medal was won by Jake Riccardi (Werribee).

== Notable events ==
- In 2019, the VFL announced new naming partners, with Hard Yakka and Totally Workwear joining as major sponsors.

== See also ==
- List of VFA/VFL premiers
- Australian rules football
- Victorian Football League
- Australian Football League
- 2019 AFL season
