= Chris Burgess (footballer) =

Australian rules footballer (born 1995)

Personal information
- Born: 26 November 1995 (age 30)
- Original teams: West Adelaide (SANFL); Flinders Park (AdFL)
- Draft: Pre-draft selection, 2018 national draft
- Debut: Round 1 2019, Gold Coast vs. St Kilda, at Docklands Stadium
- Height: 191 cm (6 ft 3 in)
- Weight: 82 kg (181 lb)
- Position: Forward

Playing career
Years	Club	Games (Goals)
2019–2023	Gold Coast	36 (14)
2024–2025	Adelaide	8 (7)
Total		44 (21)

Career highlights
- VFL premiership player: 2023; 2× Jim 'Frosty' Miller Medal 2022, 2023; Adelaide reserves best and fairest: 2025

Chris Burgess (born 26 November 1995) is a former professional Australian rules footballer who played for Gold Coast and Adelaide in the Australian Football League (AFL). He was recruited by Gold Coast from West Adelaide Football Club in the 2018 AFL draft as a pre-draft selection.

== AFL career ==
=== Gold Coast ===
The tall forward made his AFL debut for the Suns in round one of 2019, kicking a goal in the loss to St Kilda.

Burgess won the Jim 'Frosty' Miller Medal as the leading goal kicker in the VFL for season 2022 and 2023. He starred for the Suns' reserves as they won the 2023 VFL Grand Final, kicking three goals in that match against Werribee. One month after Gold Coast's premiership win, Burgess was traded to Adelaide following his trade request.

=== Adelaide ===
Burgess played his first game for Adelaide against his former club in round one, 2024. Despite being contracted until the end of 2025, Burgess was delisted by Adelaide in October 2024, with a commitment to redrafting him as a rookie. Alongside midfielder Harry Schoenberg, Burgess rejoined the club as a rookie in the 2025 rookie draft.

During the 2025 SANFL season, Burgess was awarded with the Neil Kerley Medal for his best-on-ground performance against West Adelaide in which he kicked four goals. With strong form in the SANFL, Burgess returned to Adelaide's AFL side in the round 22 win against West Coast in 2025.

Burgess was delisted at the end of the 2025 AFL season, after 8 matches across 2 seasons at the Crows.

== Statistics ==
Legend
G	Goals	K	Kicks	D	Disposals	T	Tackles
B	Behinds	H	Handballs	M	Marks	H/O	Hit-outs

Season	Team	No.	Games	Totals								Averages (per game)								Votes
Season	Team	No.	Games	G	B	K	H	D	M	T	H/O	G	B	K	H	D	M	T	H/O	Votes
2019	Gold Coast	29	14	4	3	55	60	115	38	22	7	0.3	0.2	3.9	4.3	8.2	2.7	1.6	0.5	0
2021	Gold Coast	29	19	10	10	112	62	174	67	42	177	0.5	0.5	5.9	3.3	9.2	3.5	2.2	9.3	0
2022	Gold Coast	29	2	0	1	5	6	11	7	2	0	0.0	0.5	2.5	3.0	5.5	3.5	1.0	0.0	0
2023	Gold Coast	29	1	0	2	3	2	5	1	0	3	0.0	2.0	3.0	2.0	5.0	1.0	0.0	3.0	0
2024	Adelaide	21	7	7	6	36	18	54	22	9	34	1.0	0.9	5.1	2.6	7.7	3.1	1.3	4.9	0
2025	Adelaide	21	1	0	2	8	2	10	5	2	0	0.0	2.0^{†}	8.0	2.0	10.0	5.0	2.0	0.0	0
Career			44	21	24	219	150	369	140	77	221	0.5	0.5	5.0	3.4	8.4	3.2	1.8	5.0	0
