= Marty Hore =

Australian rules footballer (born 1996)

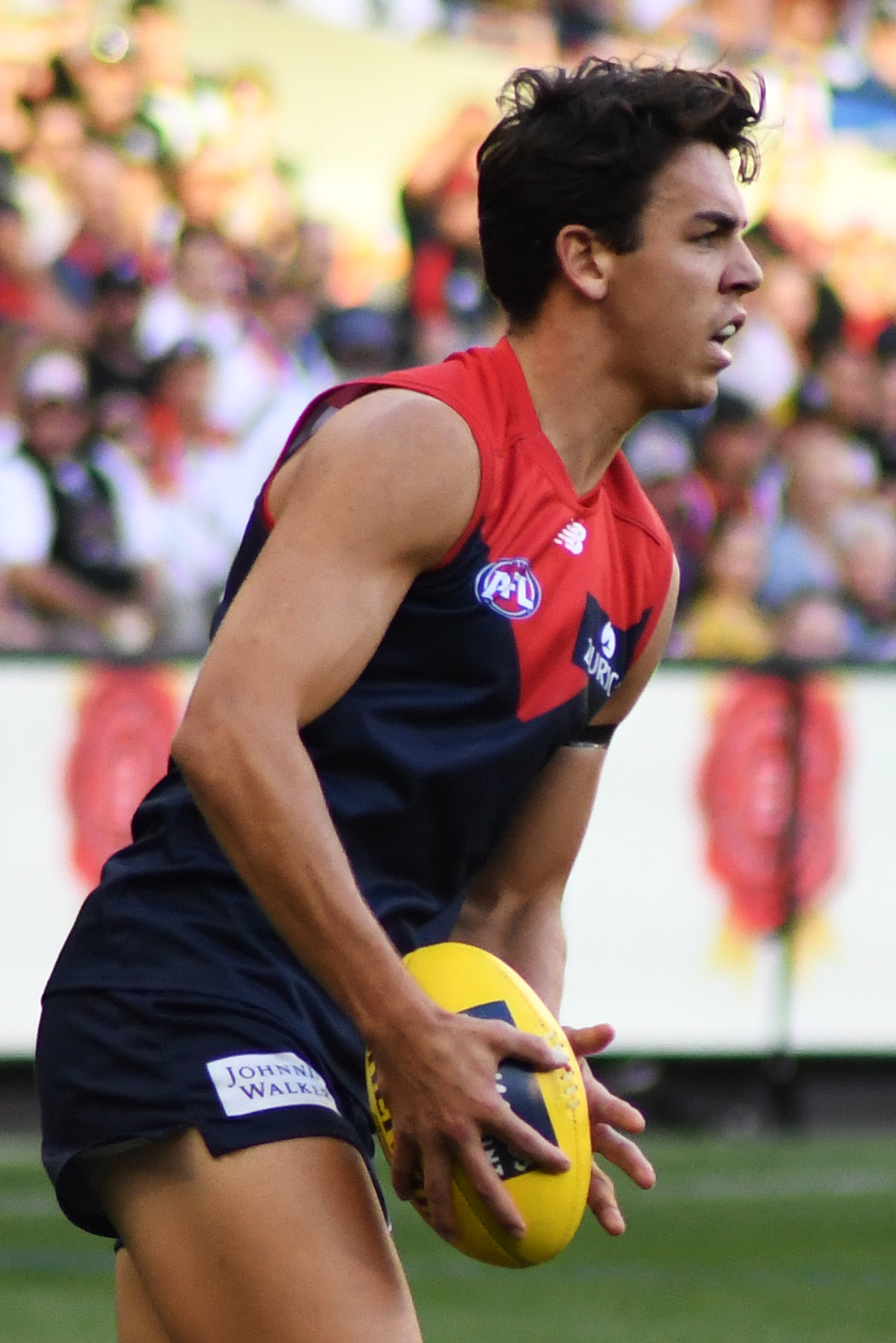
- Hore in April 2019

Personal information
- Born: 5 March 1996 (age 30)
- Original team: Collingwood (VFL)
- Draft: No. 56, 2018 national draft
- Debut: Round 1, 2019, Melbourne vs. Port Adelaide, at MCG
- Height: 190 cm (6 ft 3 in)
- Weight: 84 kg (185 lb)
- Position: Defender

Playing career
Years	Club	Games (Goals)
2019–2021, 2024–2025	Melbourne	20 (1)

Marty Hore (born 5 March 1996) is a former professional Australian rules footballer who played for the Melbourne Football Club in the Australian Football League (AFL). He was drafted by Melbourne with their fourth selection and fifty-sixth overall in the 2018 national draft. He made his debut in the twenty-six point loss to Port Adelaide at the Melbourne Cricket Ground in the opening round of the 2019 season. He was delisted by the Demons at the end of the 2021 season, but returned to the club during the pre-season supplementary selection period at the end of 2023. Hore spent two seasons at the Demons in his second stint, before again being delisted at the end of the 2025 AFL season.

== Statistics ==
Legend
G	Goals	K	Kicks	D	Disposals	T	Tackles
B	Behinds	H	Handballs	M	Marks

Season	Team	No.	Games	Totals							Averages (per game)							Votes
Season	Team	No.	Games	G	B	K	H	D	M	T	G	B	K	H	D	M	T	Votes
2019	Melbourne	34	14	1	0	145	73	218	69	21	0.1	0.0	10.4	5.2	15.6	4.9	1.5	1
2020 (Note: The 2020 season was played with 17 home-and-away matches per team (down from 22) and 16-minute quarters with time on (down from 20-minute quarters with time on) due to the impact of the COVID-19 pandemic.)	Melbourne	34	0	—	—	—	—	—	—	—	—	—	—	—	—	—	—	0
2021	Melbourne	34	0	—	—	—	—	—	—	—	—	—	—	—	—	—	—	0
2024	Melbourne	27	6	0	0	57	12	69	36	7	0.0	0.0	9.5	2.0	11.5	6.0	1.2	0
2025	Melbourne	27	0	—	—	—	—	—	—	—	—	—	—	—	—	—	—	0
Career			20	1	0	202	85	287	105	28	0.1	0.0	10.1	4.3	14.4	5.3	1.4	1
