= 2026 Collingwood Football Club season =

Australian Football League team season

Collingwood Football Club
2026 season
- President: Barry Carp

The 2026 Collingwood Football Club season was the club's 130th season of senior competition in the Australian Football League (AFL). The club also fielded its reserves team in the Victorian Football League and women's teams in the AFL Women's and VFL Women's competitions.

== Overview ==
Collingwood's 2026 season overview
Team	Captain(s)	Coach	Home ground	W–L–D	Ladder	Finals	Best and fairest	Leading goalkicker	Refs
AFL	Darcy Moore	Craig McRae	Melbourne Cricket Ground	12–9–1	9th	Wildcard final	Nick Daicos	Daniel McStay (47)	
AFLW	Ruby Schleicher	Sam Wright	Victoria Park	1–11–0	17th	DNQ	TBD	Ruby Schleicher (10)	
VFL	Brady Grey & Ben De Bolfo	Matthew Lokan	Victoria Park & KGM Centre	7–11–0	16th	DNQ	Oskar Faulkhead	Jack Buller (27)	
VFLW	Dominique Carbone	Tom Cashin	Victoria Park	10–4–0	3rd	Preliminary final	Dominique Carbone	Amelia Peck (28)	

== Squad ==
Players are listed by guernsey number, and 2026 statistics are for AFL regular season and finals series matches during the 2026 AFL season only. Career statistics include a player's complete AFL career, which, as a result, means that a player's debut and part or whole of their career statistics may be for another club. Statistics are correct as of the wildcard final of the 2026 season (28 August 2026) and are taken from AFL Tables.

No.	Name	AFL debut	Games (2026)	Goals (2026)	Games (CFC)	Goals (CFC)	Games (AFL career)	Goals (AFL career)
1	Patrick Lipinski	2017 (Western Bulldogs)	20	10	105	52	161	82
2	Jordan De Goey	2015	22	21	204	231	204	231
3	Isaac Quaynor	2019	21	0	154	5	154	5
4	Brayden Maynard	2015	17	1	246	26	246	26
5	Jamie Elliott	2012	11	17	230	364	230	364
7	Josh Daicos	2017	24	1	175	68	175	68
8	Lachie Schultz	2019 (Fremantle)	22	24	58	61	148	162
9	Dan Houston	2017 (Port Adelaide)	24	6	45	13	213	54
10	Scott Pendlebury	2006	17	5	442	209	442	209
11	Daniel McStay	2014 (Brisbane Lions)	24	47	61	94	222	232
12	Harry Perryman	2017 (Greater Western Sydney)	16	0	41	4	170	32
13	Harry DeMattia	****	0	0	0	0	0	0
14	Darcy Cameron	2018 (Sydney)	23	3	142	72	143	72
15	Wil Parker	2024	5	0	14	1	14	1
16	Ed Allan	2024	19	6	34	8	34	8
17	Billy Frampton	2018 (Port Adelaide)	24	0	74	8	98	20
18	Tyan Prindable	****	0	0	0	0	0	0
19	Tew Jiath	2024	0	0	1	0	1	0
20	Iliro Smit	****	0	0	0	0	0	0
21	Oscar Steene	2026	8	4	8	4	8	4
22	Steele Sidebottom	2009	21	4	375	213	375	213
24	Jakob Ryan	2023	0	0	1	0	1	0
25	Jack Crisp	2012 (Brisbane Lions)	24	6	280	92	298	102
26	Reef McInnes	2022	0	0	23	19	23	19
27	Joel Cochran	****	0	0	0	0	0	0
28	Tim Membrey	2014 (Sydney)	20	33	43	65	222	358
29	Charlie West	2025	9	9	10	10	10	10
30	Darcy Moore (c)	2015	4	0	199	67	199	67
31	Beau McCreery	2021	23	13	119	71	119	71
32	Sam Swadling	2026	9	6	9	6	9	6
33	Lachie Sullivan	2024	2	2	26	10	26	10
34	Jack Buller	2023 (Sydney)	10	7	10	7	20	18
35	Nick Daicos	2022	23	26	118	89	118	89
36	Harvey Harrison	2023	12	4	28	18	28	18
37	Zac McCarthy	****	0	0	0	0	0	0
38	Jeremy Howe	2011 (Melbourne)	18	1	189	24	289	104
39	William Hayes	2025	10	8	12	8	12	8
40	Noah Howes	2026	2	0	2	0	2	0
41	Angus Anderson	2026	17	20	17	20	17	20
43	Jai Saxena	****	0	0	0	0	0	0
44	Ned Long	2024	22	7	54	16	59	17
45	Roan Steele	2025	19	15	24	15	24	15
46	Mitch Podhajski	2026	2	1	2	1	2	1
47	Liam Puncher	2026	8	0	8	0	8	0
48	Harrison Coe	****	0	0	0	0	0	0

=== Squad changes ===
==== In ====
No.	Name	Position	Previous club	via
34	(Western Australia) Jack Buller	Forward	Sydney	trade
18	(Queensland) Tyan Prindable	Midfielder	Coorparoo	AFL national draft, second round (pick No. 32)
32	(Western Australia) Sam Swadling	Midfielder	West Perth	AFL national draft, third round (pick No. 37)
37	(Victoria (state)) Zac McCarthy	Forward	Oakleigh Chargers	AFL national draft, third round (pick No. 55), Next Generation Academy selection
41	(South Australia) Angus Anderson	Midfielder	Sturt	AFL national draft, fourth round (pick No. 57)
43	(Victoria (state)) Jai Saxena	Forward	Oakleigh Chargers	pre-listed category A rookie, Next Generation Academy selection
48	(Victoria (state)) Harrison Coe	Ruck	Frankston	AFL Mid-season rookie draft, first round (pick No. 8)
47	(South Australia) Liam Puncher	Defender	Woodville-West Torrens	AFL Mid-season rookie draft, second round (pick No. 15)
46	(Victoria (state)) Mitch Podhajski	Forward	Coburg	AFL Mid-season rookie draft, third round (pick No. 18)

==== Out ====
No.	Name	Position	New club	via
32	(Victoria (state)) Will Hoskin-Elliott	Midfielder		retired
18	(Victoria (state)) Finlay Macrae	Midfielder		delisted
37	(South Australia) Oleg Markov	Defender		delisted
40	(Western Australia) Ash Johnson	Forward		delisted
43	(Victoria (state)) Charlie Dean	Defender		delisted
41	(Tasmania) Brody Mihocek	Forward	Melbourne	trade
6	(Victoria (state)) Tom Mitchell	Midfielder		delisted
46	(United States) Mason Cox	Ruck / Forward		delisted
23	(Western Australia) Bobby Hill	Forward		mutual contract termination

== AFL season ==
=== Pre-season matches ===
Collingwood's 2026 simulation match and AAMI Community Series fixture
Date and local time	Opponent	Scores^{[a]}			Venue	Ref
Date and local time	Opponent	Home	Away	Result	Venue	Ref
Friday, 20 February (11:00 am)	Greater Western Sydney	11.9 (75)	17.8 (110)	Lost by 35 points	Tony Sheehan Oval [H]	
Sunday, 1 March (3:10 pm)	North Melbourne	12.18 (90)	14.5 (89)	Lost by 1 point	Mars Stadium [A]	

=== Regular season ===
Collingwood's 2026 AFL season fixture
Round	Date and local time	Opponent	Home	Away	Result	Venue	Attendance	Ladder position	Ref.
Round	Date and local time	Opponent	Scores^{[a]}			Venue	Attendance	Ladder position	Ref.
Opening Round	Sunday, 8 March (7:20 pm)	St Kilda	9.12 (66)	11.12 (78)	Won by 12 points	MCG [A]	82,528	4th	
1	Saturday, 14 March (7:35 pm)	Adelaide	11.13 (79)	13.15 (93)	Lost by 14 points	MCG [H]	62,482	8th	
2	Bye							9th	Bye
3	Friday, 27 March (7:40 pm)	Greater Western Sydney	13.9 (87)	7.12 (54)	Won by 33 points	Marvel Stadium [H]	41,607	7th	
4	Thursday, 2 April (6:30 pm)	Brisbane Lions	17.17 (119)	10.5 (65)	Lost by 54 points	Gabba [A]	34,648	10th	
5	Friday, 10 April (7:10 pm)	Fremantle	5.9 (39)	7.3 (45)	Lost by 6 points	Adelaide Oval [N]	47,275	13th	
6	Thursday, 16 April (7:30 pm)	Carlton	12.11 (83)	13.10 (88)	Won by 5 points	MCG [A]	78,058	11th	
7	Saturday, 25 April (3:20 pm)	Essendon	9.6 (60)	20.17 (137)	Won by 77 points	MCG [A]	92,231	8th	
8	Thursday, 30 April (7:30 pm)	Hawthorn	15.3 (93)	13.15 (93)	Draw	MCG [H]	76,632	8th	
9	Saturday, 9 May (7:35 pm)	Geelong	18.14 (122)	9.14 (68)	Lost by 54 points	MCG [A]	83,166	10th	
10	Friday, 15 May (7:30 pm)	Sydney	11.15 (81)	10.15 (75)	Lost by 6 points	SCG [A]	40,627	11th	
11	Saturday, 23 May (4:35 pm)	West Coast	13.14 (92)	12.10 (82)	Won by 10 points	MCG [H]	90,028	10th	
12	Saturday, 30 May (7:35 pm)	Western Bulldogs	14.13 (97)	13.15 (93)	Lost by 4 points	Marvel Stadium [A]	43,430	11th	
13	Monday, 8 June (3:15 pm)	Melbourne	11.9 (75)	12.11 (83)	Lost by 8 points	MCG [H]	88,019	11th	
14	Bye							13th	Bye
15	Saturday, 20 June (7:35 pm)	Port Adelaide	11.12 (78)	6.16 (52)	Won by 26 points	MCG [H]	40,860	11th	
16	Saturday, 27 June (4:15 pm)	Richmond	15.16 (106)	11.6 (72)	Won by 34 points	MCG [H]	62,117	10th	
17	Saturday, 4 July (4:15 pm)	Gold Coast	15.8 (98)	15.14 (104)	Won by 6 points	People First Stadium [A]	21,072	9th	
18	Friday, 10 July (7:40 pm)	North Melbourne	13.11 (89)	12.13 (85)	Won by 4 points	Marvel Stadium [H]	48,369	8th	
19	Saturday, 18 July (7:35 pm)	Carlton	14.6 (90)	10.9 (69)	Won by 21 points	MCG [H]	83,885	8th	
20	Thursday, 23 July (7:30 pm)	Adelaide	11.8 (74)	16.12 (108)	Won by 34 points	Adelaide Oval [A]	50,109	8th	
21	Thursday, 30 July (7:30 pm)	Geelong	10.12 (72)	15.7 (97)	Lost by 25 points	MCG [H]	60,023	9th	
22	Sunday, 9 August (5:10 pm)	West Coast	15.8 (98)	17.15 (117)	Won by 19 points	Optus Stadium [A]	47,609	8th	
23	Saturday, 15 August (7:40 pm)	Hawthorn	13.14 (92)	13.14 (92)	Draw	MCG [A]	76,186	8th	
24	Friday, 21 August (7:40 pm)	Brisbane Lions	15.6 (96)	25.9 (159)	Lost by 63 points	MCG [H]	66,846	9th	

=== Finals series ===
Collingwood's 2026 AFL finals series fixtures
Round	Date and local time	Opponent	Home	Away	Result	Venue	Attendance	Ref
Round	Date and local time	Opponent	Scores^{[a]}			Venue	Attendance	Ref
2nd wildcard final	Friday, 28 August (7:40 pm)	Western Bulldogs	14.12 (96)	14.9 (93)	Lost by 3 points	MCG [A]	81,036	
Collingwood was eliminated from the 2026 AFL finals series

=== Ladder ===
Pos	Team	Pld	W	L	D	PF	PA	PP	Pts	Qualification
1	Fremantle	23	19	4	0	2286	1666	137.2	76	Finals series
2	Sydney	23	18	5	0	2543	1869	136.1	72	Finals series
3	Brisbane Lions (P)	23	16	7	0	2499	2054	121.7	64	Finals series
4	Hawthorn	23	15	6	2	2260	1881	120.1	64	Finals series
5	Geelong	23	15	8	0	2355	1925	122.3	60	Finals series
6	Adelaide	23	15	8	0	2169	1849	117.3	60	Finals series
7	Melbourne	23	15	8	0	2301	2099	109.6	60	Finals series
8	Western Bulldogs	23	13	9	1	1901	1992	95.4	54	Finals series
9	Collingwood	23	12	9	2	2021	1974	102.4	52	Finals series
10	Carlton	23	12	10	1	2007	1978	101.5	50	Finals series
11	St Kilda	23	10	13	0	2030	1974	102.8	40	
12	Greater Western Sydney	23	10	13	0	2073	2095	98.9	40	
13	Gold Coast	23	9	14	0	2011	2128	94.5	36	
14	North Melbourne	23	9	14	0	1932	2175	88.8	36	
15	Port Adelaide	23	7	16	0	1804	2048	88.1	28	
16	West Coast	23	4	19	0	1615	2333	69.2	16	
17	Richmond	23	3	20	0	1483	2373	62.5	12	
18	Essendon	23	2	21	0	1601	2478	64.6	8	

Source: afl.com.au
Rules for classification: 1) points; 2) percentage; 3) number of points for
(P) Premiers

=== Awards & Milestones ===
==== AFL awards ====
- Anzac Medal – Scott Pendlebury (Round 7)
- 2026 All-Australian team – Nick Daicos
- Leigh Matthews Trophy – Nick Daicos
- AFL Coaches Association Champion Player of the Year – Nick Daicos
- Lou Richards Medal – Nick Daicos
- 2026 Brownlow Medal – Nick Daicos

==== AFL award nominations ====
- Round 23 – 2026 AFL Rising Star nomination – Sam Swadling
- 2026 All-Australian team 46-man squad – Josh Daicos, Nick Daicos

==== Club awards ====
- E.W. Copeland Trophy – Nick Daicos
- R.T. Rush Trophy – Josh Daicos
- J.J. Joyce Trophy – Darcy Cameron
- J.F. McHale Trophy – Dan Houston
- Jack Regan Trophy – Isaac Quaynor
- Joseph Wren Memorial Trophy – Oskar Faulkhead
- Darren Millane Memorial Trophy – Brayden Maynard
- Harry Collier Trophy – Sam Swadling
- Gordon Coventry Trophy – Dan McStay
- Gavin Brown Award – Billy Frampton

==== Milestones ====
- Opening Round – Jack Buller (Collingwood debut)
- Round 1 – Daniel McStay (200 AFL games)
- Round 3 – Oscar Steene (AFL debut)
- Round 4 – Beau McCreery (100 games)
- Round 5 – Angus Anderson (AFL debut)
- Round 6 – Nick Daicos (100 games)
- Round 9 – Daniel McStay (200 AFL goals)
- Round 11 – Dan Houston (200 AFL goals)
- Round 11 – Scott Pendlebury (All-time VFL/AFL games record - 433 games)
- Round 13 – Mitch Podhajski (AFL debut)
- Round 15 – Sam Swadling (AFL debut)
- Round 17 – Liam Puncher (AFL debut)
- Round 17 – Patrick Lipinski (100 Collingwood games)
- Round 17 – Jack Crisp (100 AFL goals)
- Round 20 – Jordan De Goey (200 games)
- Round 22 – Noah Howes (AFL debut)

== VFL season ==
=== Pre-season matches ===
Collingwood's 2026 VFL practice matches
Date and local time	Opponent	Scores^{[a]}			Venue	Ref
Date and local time	Opponent	Home	Away	Result	Venue	Ref
Sunday, 1 March	North Melbourne	11.8 (74)	15.14 (104)	Won by 30 points	Arden Street Oval [A]	

=== Regular season ===
Collingwood's 2026 VFL season fixture
Round	Date and local time	Opponent	Home	Away	Result	Venue	Ladder position	Ref
Round	Date and local time	Opponent	Scores^{[a]}			Venue	Ladder position	Ref
1	Bye						21st	Bye
2	Friday, 27 March (3:00 pm)	Greater Western Sydney	11.13 (79)	14.11 (95)	Lost by 16 points	KGM Centre [H]	16th	
3	Friday, 3 April (1:05 pm)	Coburg	10.14 (74)	17.17 (119)	Won by 45 points	Barry Plant Park [A]	9th	
4	Friday, 17 April (7:05 pm)	Carlton	11.19 (85)	7.12 (54)	Lost by 31 points	IKON Park [A]	16th	
5	Friday, 24 April (2:05 pm)	Essendon	17.12 (114)	15.13 (103)	Won by 11 points	KGM Centre [H]	11th	
6	Friday, 1 May (7:05 pm)	Box Hill	16.13 (109)	15.10 (100)	Lost by 9 points	Kennedy Community Centre [A]	14th	
7	Saturday, 9 May (3:05 pm)	Geelong	8.7 (55)	17.14 (116)	Lost by 61 points	Victoria Park [H]	17th	
8	Friday, 15 May (2:00 pm)	Sydney	19.12 (126)	10.14 (74)	Lost by 52 points	Tramway Oval [A]	18th	
9	Saturday, 23 May (12:05 pm)	Werribee	19.12 (126)	14.11 (95)	Lost by 31 points	Avalon Airport Oval [A]	20th	
10	Saturday, 30 May (3:05 pm)	Footscray	14.8 (92)	10.12 (72)	Lost by 20 points	Mission Whitten Oval [A]	20th	
11	Saturday, 6 June (12:05 pm)	Casey	9.14 (68)	8.8 (56)	Won by 12 points	Casey Fields [H]	19th	
12	Bye						20th	Bye
13	Friday, 19 June (7:35 pm)	Frankston	12.7 (79)	11.12 (78)	Lost by 1 point	Kinetic Stadium [A]	19th	
14	Saturday, 27 June (12:05 pm)	Richmond	19.18 (132)	9.8 (62)	Won by 70 points	La Trobe Sports Park [H]	18th	
15	Saturday, 4 July (10:00 am)	Brisbane	8.19 (67)	13.10 (88)	Lost by 21 points	Barry Plant Park [H]	18th	
16	Friday, 10 July (3:25 pm)	North Melbourne	17.16 (118)	11.9 (75)	Won by 43 points	Marvel Stadium [H]	17th	
17	Bye						18th	Bye
18	Friday, 24 July (12:00 pm)	St Kilda	14.19 (103)	14.9 (93)	Won by 10 points	La Trobe Sports Park [H]	17th	
19	Friday, 31 July (4:00 pm)	Geelong	12.12 (84)	17.10 (112)	Won by 28 points	GMHBA Stadium [A]	15th	
20	Saturday, 8 August (12:05 pm)	Essendon	10.15 (75)	11.8 (74)	Lost by 1 point	Windy Hill [A]	16th	
21	Saturday, 15 August (2:05 pm)	Port Melbourne	17.13 (115)	14.5 (89)	Lost by 26 points	ETU Stadium [A]	16th	

=== Ladder ===
Pos	Team	Pld	W	L	D	PF	PA	PP	Pts
14	Footscray (R)	18	8	10	0	1565	1477	106.0	32
15	St Kilda (R)	18	7	10	1	1484	1546	96.0	30
16	Collingwood (R)	18	7	11	0	1603	1653	97.0	28
17	North Melbourne (R)	18	6	11	1	1591	1729	92.0	26
18	Brisbane (R)	18	6	12	0	1628	1703	95.6	24

Source: AFL.com.au
Rules for classification: 1) points; 2) percentage; 3) number of points for
(R) Club is the reserves team of a senior club of the Australian Football League

== AFLW season ==
=== Pre-season matches ===
Collingwood's 2026 AFLW pre-season fixture
Date and time	Opponent	Home	Away	Result	Venue	Ref
Date and time	Opponent	Scores^{[a]}			Venue	Ref
Friday, 10 July	Carlton	—N/a	—N/a	—N/a	KGM Centre [H]	
Saturday, 18 July	North Melbourne	5.2 (32)	1.0 (6)	Lost by 26 points	Arden Street Oval [A]	
Friday, 24 July (12:00 pm)	West Coast	6.12 (48)	8.4 (52)	Won by 4 points	Mineral Resources Park [A]	
Saturday, 1 August	Western Bulldogs	(46)	10.2 (62)	Won by 16 points	Whitten Oval [A]	

=== Regular season ===
Collingwood's 2026 AFL Women's season fixture
Round	Date and time	Opponent	Home	Away	Result	Venue	Attendance	Ladder position	Ref
Round	Date and time	Opponent	Scores^{[a]}			Venue	Attendance	Ladder position	Ref
1	Saturday, 15 August (7:15 pm)	Richmond	6.10 (46)	4.4 (28)	Lost by 18 points	Ikon Park [A]	2,146	13th	
2	Sunday, 23 August (12:35 pm)	Fremantle	4.6 (30)	8.2 (50)	Lost by 20 points	Victoria Park [H]	1,616	16th	
3	Sunday, 30 August (3:05 pm)	Hawthorn	3.8 (26)	8.6 (54)	Lost by 28 points	Victoria Park [H]	2,604	17th	
4	Sunday, 6 September (3:05 pm)	Carlton	10.8 (68)	4.5 (29)	Lost by 39 points	Ikon Park [A]	3,892	17th	
5	Saturday, 12 September (2:35 pm)	Gold Coast	9.8 (62)	4.8 (32)	Lost by 30 points	People First Stadium [A]	1,472	17th	
6	Saturday, 19 September (12:35 pm)	Geelong	7.7 (49)	14.6 (90)	Lost by 41 points	Victoria Park [H]	2,041	17th	
7	Sunday, 27 September (1:05 pm)	Greater Western Sydney	4.10 (34)	3.7 (25)	Won by 9 points	Victoria Park [H]	1,571	16th	
8	Sunday, 4 October (3:05 pm)	Melbourne	2.9 (21)	6.6 (42)	Lost by 21 points	Victoria Park [H]	3,316	17th	
9	Saturday, 10 October (1:05 pm)	St Kilda	5.9 (39)	5.7 (37)	Lost by 2 points	RSEA Park [A]	2,180	16th	
10	Sunday, 18 October (12:30 pm)	Sydney	4.5 (29)	12.8 (80)	Lost by 51 points	Windy Hill [H]	2,305	16th	
11	Friday, 23 October (7:15 pm)	Port Adelaide	8.4 (52)	0.4 (4)	Lost by 48 points	Alberton Oval [A]	3,112	17th	
12	Sunday, 1 November (1:05 pm)	Essendon	4.14 (38)	4.7 (31)	Lost by 7 points	Windy Hill [A]	2,668	17th	

=== Ladder ===
Pos	Team	Pld	W	L	D	PF	PA	PP	Pts	Qualification
1	North Melbourne	12	11	1	0	789	320	246.6	44	Finals series
2	Geelong	12	11	1	0	871	484	180.0	44	Finals series
3	Melbourne	12	10	2	0	715	405	176.5	40	Finals series
4	Carlton	12	9	3	0	554	416	133.2	36	Finals series
5	Gold Coast	12	9	3	0	609	458	133.0	36	Finals series
6	Sydney	12	9	3	0	606	527	115.0	36	Finals series
7	Western Bulldogs	12	8	4	0	495	448	110.5	32	Finals series
8	Hawthorn	12	7	5	0	580	513	113.1	28	Finals series
9	Port Adelaide	12	6	6	0	422	454	93.0	24	
10	Fremantle	12	5	7	0	477	489	97.5	20	
11	Adelaide	12	5	7	0	528	544	97.1	20	
12	Brisbane	12	4	8	0	504	502	100.4	16	
13	West Coast	12	4	8	0	459	656	70.0	16	
14	Richmond	12	4	8	0	468	714	65.5	16	
15	Greater Western Sydney	12	2	10	0	479	691	69.3	8	
16	Essendon	12	2	10	0	386	646	59.8	8	
17	Collingwood	12	1	11	0	350	646	54.2	4	
18	St Kilda	12	1	11	0	332	711	46.7	4	

Source: afl.com.au
Rules for classification: 1) points; 2) percentage; 3) number of points for

=== Squad ===
Players are listed by guernsey number, and 2026 statistics are for AFL Women's regular season and finals series matches during the 2026 AFL Women's season only. Career statistics include a player's complete AFL Women's career, which, as a result, means that a player's debut and part or whole of their career statistics may be for another club. Statistics are correct as of round 12 of the 2026 season (1 November 2026) and are taken from Australian Football.

No.	Name	AFLW debut	Games (2026)	Goals (2026)	Games (CFC)	Goals (CFC)	Games (AFLW career)	Goals (AFLW career)
1	Sabrina Frederick	2017 (Brisbane)	11	1	65	15	103	35
2	Eliza James	2022 (S6)	9	4	48	25	48	25
3	Brianna Davey	2017 (Carlton)	8	1	41	13	58	16
4	Imogen Barnett	2022 (S6)	5	1	40	5	40	5
5	Maisie Nankivell	2019 (Adelaide)	1	0	1	0	3	0
6	Jordyn Allen	2019	8	0	79	6	79	6
7	Sarah Rowe	2019	7	0	82	13	82	13
8	Brittany Bonnici	2017	12	2	89	10	89	10
9	Mischa Barwin	2026	5	1	5	1	5	1
10	Matilda Argus	****	0	0	0	0	0	0
11	Ariana Hetherington	2023 (Fremantle)	12	1	12	1	29	2
12	Georgia Knight	2025	3	0	8	1	8	1
14	Mattea Breed	2023 (Hawthorn)	9	1	9	1	29	4
16	Ash Centra	2025	11	8	19	14	19	14
17	Dominique Carbone	2022 (S7) (Hawthorn)	6	2	6	2	14	2
18	Ruby Schleicher (c)	2017	8	10	82	17	82	17
19	Ellie Brady	2026	1	1	1	1	1	1
20	Charlotte Brewer	2026	7	0	7	0	7	0
21	Amber Schutte	2024	12	0	32	0	32	0
22	Imogen Trengove	2026	12	1	12	1	12	1
23	Lauren Butler	2019	1	0	62	5	62	5
24	Kellyann Hogan	2025	6	1	10	1	10	1
25	Zara Neuwirth	2026	7	0	7	0	7	0
26	Violet Patterson	2025	11	0	22	1	22	1
27	Lucille Cronin	2024	10	2	33	2	33	2
28	Amy Smith	2026	2	0	2	0	2	0
29	Tarni White	2020 (St Kilda)	12	2	42	6	74	9
30	Carly Remmos	2024	12	0	31	1	31	1
33	Olivia Lewis	2026	3	1	3	1	3	1
35	Kalinda Howarth	2020 (Gold Coast)	6	2	17	9	52	29
36	Airlie Runnalls	2022 (S6) (Fremantle)	12	2	24	4	68	9
37	Josephine Bamford	2026	12	0	12	0	12	0
43	Jemma Rigoni	2025 (Melbourne)	11	1	11	1	19	2

==== Squad changes ====
In

No.	Name	Position	Previous club	via
33	(Western Australia) Olivia Lewis		Melbourne Mavericks	rookie signing
5	(South Australia) Maisie Nankivell		Melbourne Mavericks	rookie signing
19	(Republic of Ireland) Ellie Brady		Cavan	rookie signing
20	(Victoria (state)) Charlotte Brewer	Midfielder	Carlton	delisted free agency
11	(Victoria (state)) Ariana Hetherington	Forward	North Melbourne	trade
43	(Victoria (state)) Jemma Rigoni	Defender	Melbourne	delisted free agency
22	(South Australia) Imogen Trengove	Utility	Woodville-West Torrens	AFLW national draft, first round (pick no. 8)
28	(Victoria (state)) Amy Smith	Utility	Sandringham Dragons	AFLW national draft, first round (pick no. 23)
9	(Tasmania) Mischa Barwin	Forward	Tasmania Devils	AFLW national draft, second round (pick no. 28)
37	(Victoria (state)) Josephine Bamford	Ruck	Eastern Ranges	AFLW national draft, second round (pick no. 29)
10	(Victoria (state)) Matilda Argus	Defender	Dandenong Stingrays	AFLW national draft, third round (pick no. 41)
25	(Victoria (state)) Zara Neuwirth	Defender	Oakleigh Chargers	AFLW national draft, third round (pick no. 48)
17	(Victoria (state)) Dominique Carbone	Forward	Collingwood VFLW	injury replacement

Out

No.	Name	Position	New club	via
10	(Republic of Ireland) Muireann Atkinson	Defender		delisted
11	(Victoria (state)) Charlotte Taylor	Midfielder		delisted
17	(Victoria (state)) Nell Morris-Dalton	Forward		delisted
20	(Victoria (state)) Selena Karlson	Defender		delisted
22	(Western Australia) Mikayla Hyde	Forward		delisted
5	(Victoria (state)) Annie Lee	Defender		delisted
9	(Victoria (state)) Alana Porter	Defender		delisted
13	(Victoria (state)) Grace Campbell	Midfielder		delisted
19	(Tasmania) Georgia Clark	Forward		delisted
25	(Victoria (state)) Mikala Cann	Midfielder	Western Bulldogs	trade
15	(Victoria (state)) Lily-Rose Williamson	Midfielder	Brisbane	trade

== VFLW season ==
=== Regular season ===
Collingwood's 2026 VFL Women's season fixture
Round	Date and local time	Opponent	Home	Away	Result	Venue	Ladder position	Ref
Round	Date and local time	Opponent	Scores^{[a]}			Venue	Ladder position	Ref
1	Saturday, 16 May (4:05 pm)	Box Hill	5.7 (37)	9.10 (64)	Won by 27 points	Box Hill City Oval [A]	4th	
2	Saturday, 23 May (11:05 am)	Sandringham	3.8 (26)	3.9 (27)	Won by 1 point	Trevor Barker Beach Oval [A]	2nd	
3	Saturday, 30 May (11:35 am)	Western Bulldogs	0.2 (2)	13.7 (85)	Won by 83 points	Mission Whitten Oval [A]	1st	
4	Saturday, 6 June (10:05 am)	Casey	11.8 (74)	1.2 (8)	Won by 66 points	KGM Centre [H]	1st	
5	Bye						2nd	Bye
6	Saturday, 20 June (11:05 am)	Essendon	2.2 (14)	10.7 (67)	Won by 53 points	Windy Hill [A]	1st	
7	Saturday, 27 June (9:00 am)	Tasmania	6.11 (47)	3.2 (20)	Won by 27 points	La Trobe Sports Park [H]	1st	
8	Saturday, 4 July (2:00 pm)	Carlton	4.6 (30)	3.8 (26)	Won by 4 points	Highgate Recreation Reserve [H]	2nd	
9	Saturday, 11 July (11:00 am)	North Melbourne Werribee	5.4 (34)	5.7 (37)	Lost by 3 points	Victoria Park [H]	3rd	
10	Saturday, 18 July (12:00 pm)	Box Hill	10.10 (70)	3.5 (23)	Won by 47 points	Victoria Park [H]	3rd	
11	Sunday, 26 July (3:05 pm)	Darebin	7.11 (53)	0.0 (0)	Won by 53 points	Preston City Oval [H]	1st	
12	Saturday, 1 August (12:05 pm)	Geelong Cats	4.3 (27)	2.6 (18)	Lost by 9 points	Deakin University [A]	1st	
13	Bye						3rd	Bye
14	Saturday, 15 August (11:05 am)	Port Melbourne	5.5 (35)	6.1 (37)	Won by 2 points	ETU Stadium [A]	2nd	
15	Saturday, 22 August (10:35 am)	North Melbourne Werribee	7.6 (48)	6.6 (42)	Lost by 6 points	Arden Street Oval [A]	3rd	
16	Saturday, 29 August (12:35 pm)	Williamstown	3.4 (22)	9.5 (59)	Lost by 37 points	DSV Stadium [H]	3rd	

=== Finals series ===
Collingwood's 2026 VFL Women's finals series fixtures
Round	Date and time	Opponent	Home	Away	Result	Venue	Ref
Round	Date and time	Opponent	Scores^{[a]}			Venue	Ref
Elimination final	Sunday, 6 September (10:05 am)	Western Bulldogs	6.2 (38)	5.7 (37)	Won by 1 point	Victoria Park [H]	
Preliminary final	Saturday, 12 September (11:35 am)	North Melbourne Werribee	12.5 (77)	2.4 (16)	Lost by 61 points	Arden Street Oval [A]	
Collingwood was eliminated from the 2026 VFLW finals series

=== Ladder ===
Pos	Team	Pld	W	L	D	PF	PA	PP	Pts	Qualification
1	Williamstown	14	12	2	0	691	271	255.0	48	Finals series
2	North Melbourne Werribee	14	12	2	0	905	457	198.0	48	Finals series
3	Collingwood	14	10	4	0	670	362	185.1	40	Finals series
4	Carlton	14	9	5	0	651	485	134.2	36	Finals series
5	Port Melbourne	14	9	5	0	525	450	116.7	36	Finals series

Source: AFL.com.au
Rules for classification: 1) points; 2) percentage; 3) number of points for.

== Notes ==
Key

- H Home match.
- A Away match.
- N Neutral venue.

Notes

- **^{a}** Collingwood's scores are indicated in **bold** font.
