= 2026 AFL draft =

Australian Football League draft

General information
- Dates: 26 May 2026 – Mid-season Draft; 19–20 November 2026 – National Draft; 23 November 2026 – Rookie Draft
- Location: Marvel Stadium
- Network: Fox Footy
- Sponsored by: National Australia Bank

Overview
- League: AFL
- First selection: Dougie Cochrane (Port Adelaide)

The 2026 AFL draft will consist of the various periods where the 18 clubs in the Australian Football League (AFL) can trade and recruit players during and following the completion of the 2026 AFL season.

== Key dates ==
Table of key dates
| Event | Date(s) |
|---|---|
| Mid-season rookie draft | 26 May 2026 |
| Free agency period | Restricted and Unrestricted: 2–9 October 2026; Delisted: 2-6 November 2026 |
| Trade period | 5–14 October 2026 |
| National draft | 19–20 November 2026 |
| Pre-Season and Rookie draft | 23 November 2026 |
| Pre-season supplemental selection period | December 2026 – March 2027 |

== 2026 mid-season rookie draft ==
The mid-season draft was held after the conclusion of round 11 of the 2026 AFL season on 26 May.

Mid-season draft selections
| Rd | Pick | Player | Club | Recruited from | | Pick due to |
| Rd | Pick | Player | Club | Club | League | Pick due to |
|---|---|---|---|---|---|---|
| 1 | 1 | Jaxon Artemis | Essendon | Tasmania | VFL | Brayden Fiorini long-term injury |
| 1 | 2 | Kye Annand | Richmond | Geelong | VFL | Josh Gibcus long-term injury |
| 1 | 3 | Oliver Francou | West Coast | North Adelaide | SANFL | Deven Robertson long-term injury |
| 1 | 4 | Flynn Riley | Carlton | Carlton | VFL | Matt Carroll long-term injury |
| 1 | 5 | Xavier Bamert | Port Adelaide | North Melbourne | VFL | Ivan Soldo retirement |
| 1 | 6 | Oliver Griffin | North Melbourne | Sandringham Dragons | Talent League | Blake Thredgold long-term injury |
| 1 | 7 | Campbell Lake | St Kilda | Southport | VFL | Passed selection at the 2025 Rookie Draft |
| 1 | 8 | Harrison Coe | Collingwood | Frankston | VFL | Reef McInnes long-term injury |
| 1 | 9 | Caleb May | Western Bulldogs | West Adelaide | SANFL | Sam Darcy long-term injury |
| 1 | 10 | Hugo Hall-Kahan | Adelaide | Williamstown | VFL | Passed selection at the 2025 Rookie Draft |
| 1 | 11 | Lukas Cooke | Melbourne | Woodville-West Torrens | SANFL | Tom Campbell retirement |
| 1 | 12 | Max Beattie | Hawthorn | Woodville-West Torrens | SANFL | Passed selection at the 2025 Rookie Draft |
| 2 | 13 | Marcus Herbert | West Coast | Geelong | VFL | Jacob Newton long-term injury |
| 2 | 14 | Alex van Wyk | Port Adelaide | North Adelaide | SANFL | Ollie Lord long-term injury |
| 2 | 15 | Liam Puncher | Collingwood | Woodville-West Torrens | SANFL | Oscar Steene long-term injury |
| 2 | 16 | Joel Fitzgerald | Melbourne | Williamstown | VFL | Jai Culley long-term injury |
| 3 | 17 | Passed | Port Adelaide | — | — | Josh Sinn long-term injury |
| 3 | 18 | Mitch Podhajski | Collingwood | Coburg | VFL | Jamie Elliott long-term injury |
| 3 | 19 | Max Mapley | Melbourne | Tasmania | VFL | Shane McAdam retirement |

== Player movements ==
=== Previous trades ===
Table of previously traded selections
| Rd | Orig. Club | New Club | Acquired via | Ref |
|---|---|---|---|---|
| 1 | Gold Coast | Melbourne | Christian Petracca trade | |
| 1 | Sydney | Carlton | Charlie Curnow and Will Hayward trade | |
| 2 | North Melbourne | Carlton | pick swap | |
| 2 | Gold Coast | Carlton | pick swap | |
| 2 | Greater Western Sydney | Hawthorn | pick swap | |
| 2 | St Kilda | Hawthorn | via West Coast (Liam Ryan trade) on-traded to Hawthorn (pick swap) | |
| 2 | Carlton | Port Adelaide | Corey Durdin and Ben Ainsworth trade | |
| 2 | Melbourne | Greater Western Sydney | via Gold Coast (Christian Petracca trade) on-traded to Greater Western Sydney (pick swap) | |
| 3 | Essendon | Adelaide | via Gold Coast Brayden Fiorini trade on-traded to Adelaide (pick swap) | |
| 3 | Gold Coast | Port Adelaide | pick swap | |
| 3 | Greater Western Sydney | Melbourne | Clayton Oliver trade | |
| 3 | Carlton | Sydney | Oliver Florent trade | |
| 3 | Collingwood | Sydney | Jack Buller trade | |
| 3 | Melbourne | Brisbane Lions | via Collingwood Brody Mihocek trade on-traded to Brisbane Lions (pick swap) | |
| 3 | Hawthorn | Brisbane Lions | pick swap | |
| 3 | Brisbane Lions | Carlton | pick swap | |
| 3 | Sydney | West Coast | via Hawthorn (Jai Serong trade) on-traded to West Coast (pick swap) | |
| 4 | Greater Western Sydney | Collingwood | pick swap | |
| 4 | Western Bulldogs | West Coast | pick swap | |
| 4 | Melbourne | Hawthorn | Changkuoth Jiath trade | |
| 4 | Adelaide | North Melbourne | Finnbar Maley trade | |
| 4 | Hawthorn | Sydney | Jai Serong trade | |
| 4 | Sydney | Collingwood | Jack Buller trade | |
| 5 | Richmond | Gold Coast | pick swap | |

=== Free agency ===
2026 AFL free agency period signings
| Player | Free agent type | New club | Recruited from | Compensation | Notes | Ref |
|---|---|---|---|---|---|---|
| Joel Amartey | Unrestricted | Carlton | Sydney | Second round | | |
| Toby Greene | Unrestricted | Geelong | Greater Western Sydney | Second round | | |
| Kieren Briggs | Unrestricted | Richmond | Greater Western Sydney | Third round | | |
| Lachie Neale | Unrestricted | Collingwood | Brisbane Lions | Second round | | |
| Jordon Butts | Unrestricted | Western Bulldogs | Adelaide | Second round | | |
| Dominic Bedendo | Delisted | Fremantle | Port Melbourne (VFL) | —N/a | Delisted by Western Bulldogs in 2024 | |
| Ben King | Restricted | Hawthorn | Gold Coast | First round | | |
| Zak Butters | Restricted | Western Bulldogs | Port Adelaide | First round | | |
| Jake Stringer | Delisted | St Kilda | Greater Western Sydney | —N/a | | |
| Max Ramsden | Delisted | St Kilda | Hawthorn | —N/a | | |
| Wil Parker | Delisted | Carlton | Collingwood | —N/a | | |
| Elijah Tsatas | Delisted | North Melbourne | Essendon | —N/a | | |
| Samson Ryan | Delisted | North Melbourne | Richmond | —N/a | | |
| Darragh Joyce | Delisted | North Melbourne | Brisbane Lions | —N/a | | |

=== Trades ===
Table of trades
| Clubs involved | Trade | | Ref |
|---|---|---|---|
| Collingwood Greater Western Sydney | to Collingwood (from Greater Western Sydney): Jesse Hogan | to Greater Western Sydney (from Collingwood): pick No. 75 | |
| Gold Coast Collingwood | to Gold Coast (from Collingwood): Scott Pendlebury | to Collingwood (from Gold Coast): pick No. 65 | |
| Hawthorn Essendon | to Hawthorn (from Essendon): Zach Merrett | to Essendon (from Hawthorn): pick No. 15; pick No. 25; 2028 second round pick (Hawthorn) | |
| Richmond Fremantle | to Richmond (from Fremantle): Nathan O'Driscoll | to Fremantle (from Richmond): pick No. 61 | |
| Geelong Essendon | to Geelong (from Essendon): Jordan Ridley; pick No. 60; 2028 fourth round pick (Essendon) | to Essendon (from Geelong): Jack Bowes; 2027 first round pick (Geelong); 2028 second round pick (Geelong) | |
| Geelong St Kilda | to Geelong (from St Kilda): Rowan Marshall; 2028 third round pick (St Kilda) | to St Kilda (from Geelong): pick No. 14 | |
| Western Bulldogs Port Adelaide Melbourne Hawthorn Carlton | to Western Bulldogs: Finn Maginness (from Hawthorn); Hudson O'Keeffe (from Carlton); pick No. 81 (from Port Adelaide); pick No. 87 (from Melbourne); 2027 second round pick (Port Adelaide); 2027 third round pick (Gold Coast) (from Melbourne); 2027 fourth round pick (Port Adelaide); 2028 second round pick (Port Adelaide); 2028 third round pick (Port Adelaide); 2028 fourth round pick (Melbourne); to Hawthorn: 2027 third round pick (Port Adelaide) | to Port Adelaide: pick No. 6 (from Melbourne); pick No. 10 (from Melbourne); 2027 first round pick (Melbourne); 2028 first round pick (Western Bulldogs); to Melbourne: pick No. 4 (from Port Adelaide); pick No. 12 (from Western Bulldogs); pick No. 31 (from Western Bulldogs); pick No. 46 (from Port Adelaide); to Carlton: 2028 fourth round pick (Port Adelaide) | |
| St Kilda Brisbane Lions | to St Kilda (from Brisbane Lions): Sam Marshall; pick No. 39 | to Brisbane Lions (from St Kilda): 2027 first round pick (St Kilda) | |
| Western Bulldogs Hawthorn | to Western Bulldogs (from Hawthorn): 2028 third round pick (Hawthorn) | to Hawthorn (from Western Bulldogs): 2027 third round pick (Gold Coast) | |
| Gold Coast Hawthorn | to Gold Coast (from Hawthorn): Aidan Schubert; Sam Butler; 2027 third round pick (Gold Coast); 2028 first round pick (Hawthorn) | to Hawthorn (from Gold Coast): 2027 second round pick (Gold Coast); 2028 first round pick (Gold Coast); 2028 second round pick (Gold Coast) | |
| North Melbourne Sydney | to North Melbourne (from Sydney): Nick Blakey; pick 52; 2028 second round pick (Sydney) | to Sydney (from North Melbourne): pick 6; pick 47; 2027 second round pick (North Melbourne); 2028 first round pick (North Melbourne); 2028 second round pick (North Melbourne) | |
| Collingwood Carlton | to Collingwood (from Carlton): Flynn Riley | to Carlton (from Collingwood): 2028 third round pick (Collingwood) | |
| Melbourne North Melbourne | to Melbourne (from North Melbourne): Zane Duursma; pick 52 | to North Melbourne (from Melbourne): pick 33; pick 49 | |
| Carlton Greater Western Sydney | to Carlton (from Greater Western Sydney): Lachie Whitfield; pick 31; pick 50 | to Greater Western Sydney (from Carlton): pick 25; pick 26; 2028 third round pick (Carlton) | |
| Richmond Port Adelaide | to Richmond (from Port Adelaide): pick 5 | to Port Adelaide (from Richmond): pick 22; 2027 first round pick (Richmond); 2027 second round pick (Richmond); 2027 fourth round pick (Richmond) | |
| Greater Western Sydney Brisbane Lions | to Greater Western Sydney (from Brisbane Lions): pick 20; pick 58 | to Brisbane Lions (from Greater Western Sydney): pick 25; pick 28 | |
| Western Bulldogs Brisbane Lions | to Western Bulldogs (from Brisbane Lions): 2027 second round pick (Western Bulldogs) | to Brisbane Lions (from Western Bulldogs): pick 42; pick 53 | |
| West Coast Melbourne | to West Coast (from Melbourne): Trent Rivers; Jack Viney; 2028 second round pick (Melbourne) | to Melbourne (from West Coast): pick 45; 2027 second round pick (West Coast); 2027 fourth round pick (West Coast); 2028 second round pick (West Coast) | |
| Melbourne Brisbane Lions | to Melbourne (from Brisbane Lions): Will McLachlan; 2027 second round pick (Brisbane Lions) | to Brisbane Lions (from Melbourne): pick 45; 2027 second round pick (Melbourne) | |
| Hawthorn North Melbourne | to Hawthorn (from North Melbourne): Josh Goater | to North Melbourne (from Hawthorn): 2027 third round pick (Port Adelaide) | |
| Essendon Brisbane Lions | to Essendon (from Brisbane Lions): Keidean Coleman; pick 25 | to Brisbane Lions (from Essendon): pick 21; pick 27 | |
| Port Adelaide Adelaide | to Port Adelaide (from Adelaide): Luke Pedlar; pick 34 | to Adelaide (from Port Adelaide): pick 32; 2027 fourth round pick (Richmond) | |
| Melbourne Hawthorn | to Melbourne (from Hawthorn): Bodie Ryan ^{[a]} | to Hawthorn (from Melbourne): pick 107 | |
Picks swapped at the 2026 National Draft (Night 1)
| Greater Western Sydney Port Adelaide | to Greater Western Sydney: pick 12 | to Port Adelaide: pick 26; 2027 second round pick (Greater Western Sydney); 2028 second round pick (Greater Western Sydney) | |
| Port Adelaide Sydney | to Port Adelaide: pick 6; 2027 second round Pick (North Melbourne) | to Sydney: pick 7; 2028 second round pick (Greater Western Sydney) | |
| Greater Western Sydney Port Adelaide | to Greater Western Sydney: 2027 second round pick (Richmond) | to Port Adelaide: pick 20 | |
| Carlton Adelaide | to Carlton: pick 15; pick 35; pick 53 | to Adelaide: pick 13; pick 58 | |
| Gold Coast Greater Western Sydney | to Gold Coast: pick 10; 2028 third round pick (Greater Western Sydney) | to Greater Western Sydney: pick 9 | |
| Greater Western Sydney Sydney | to Greater Western Sydney: pick 8 | to Sydney: pick 9; 2028 third round pick (Carlton) | |
| Brisbane Lions Greater Western Sydney | to Brisbane Lions: 2027 second round pick (Richmond) | to Greater Western Sydney: pick 43; 2028 third round pick (Brisbane Lions) | |
| Brisbane Lions Port Adelaide | to Brisbane Lions: pick 24; pick 32 | to Port Adelaide: pick 20 | |
Picks swapped at the 2026 National Draft (Night 2)
| North Melbourne West Coast | to North Melbourne: Pick 23; 2028 third round pick (West Coast) | to West Coast: 2027 first round pick (North Melbourne) | |
| Hawthorn Port Adelaide | to Port Adelaide: Pick 39 | to Hawthorn: 2027 second round pick (Greater Western Sydney) | |
| Collingwood Sydney | to Collingwood: Pick 41 | to Sydney: 2028 second round pick (Collingwood) | |
| Greater Western Sydney Richmond | to Greater Western Sydney: Pick 45 | to Richmond: Pick 46; 2028 third round pick (Brisbane Lions) | |
| Carlton Richmond | to Carlton: Pick 46 | to Richmond: Pick 51; 2028 third round pick (Collingwood) | |
| North Melbourne Western Bulldogs | to Western Bulldogs: Pick 50 | to North Melbourne: 2028 third round pick (Port Adelaide) | |

== List changes ==
=== Retirements ===
Table key
| R | Rookie listed player |
| B | Category B Rookie listed player |

Table of player retirements
| Name | Club | Notes | Ref |
|---|---|---|---|
| James Harmes | Western Bulldogs | | |
| Steven May | Melbourne | | |
| Ivan Soldo | Port Adelaide | | |
| Tom Campbell | Melbourne | | |
| Shane McAdam | Melbourne | | |
| Taylor Adams | Sydney | | |
| Jamie Cripps | West Coast | | |
| Nathan Broad | Richmond | | |
| Tom McDonald | Melbourne | | |
| Taylor Walker | Adelaide | | |
| Dion Prestia | Richmond | | |
| Steele Sidebottom | Collingwood | | |
| Nick Holman | Gold Coast | | |
| Dougal Howard | St Kilda | | |
| Jake Melksham | Melbourne | | |
| Sam Switkowski | Fremantle | | |
| Tom Liberatore | Western Bulldogs | | |
| Adam Treloar | Western Bulldogs | Not offered a contract and retired. | |
| Rhys Stanley | Geelong | | |
| Jake Kolodjashnij | Geelong | Medically retired over concussion issues | |
| Will Brodie | Port Adelaide | | |
| Dane Rampe | Sydney | | |
| Zac Williams | Carlton | Delisted on 9 September 2026; Later retired on 8 November 2026 | |

=== Delistings ===
Table of player delistings

Table key
| R | Rookie listed player |
| B | Category B Rookie listed player |

| Name | Club | Notes | Ref |
|---|---|---|---|
| Bobby Hill | Collingwood | Club and player mutually agreed to part ways. | |
| Tyson Stengle | Geelong | Club and player mutually agreed to part ways. | |
| Matt Duffy B | Carlton | Returned to Ireland | |
| Jackson Mead | Port Adelaide | | |
| Will Lorenz | Port Adelaide | | |
| Mani Liddy | Port Adelaide | | |
| Xavier Walsh | Port Adelaide | | |
| Benny Barrett | Port Adelaide | | |
| Jacob Moss | Port Adelaide | | |
| Harry Barnett | West Coast | | |
| Harvey Johnston | West Coast | | |
| Caleb Graham | Gold Coast | | |
| Asher Eastham | Gold Coast | | |
| Cooper Bell | Gold Coast | | |
| Liam Fawcett | Richmond | | |
| Kaleb Smith | Richmond | | |
| Paddy Dow | St Kilda | | |
| Isaac Keeler | St Kilda | | |
| Patrick Said | St Kilda | | |
| Tyler Brockman | West Coast | | |
| Bailey Scott | North Melbourne | | |
| Callum Coleman-Jones | North Melbourne | | |
| Robert Hansen Jr. | North Melbourne | | |
| Brayden George | North Melbourne | | |
| Wil Parker | Collingwood | | |
| Lachie Sullivan | Collingwood | | |
| Mitch Podhajski | Collingwood | | |
| Joel Cochran | Collingwood | | |
| Iliro Smit | Collingwood | | |
| Jakob Ryan | Collingwood | | |
| Kalani White | Melbourne | | |
| Jack Henderson | Melbourne | | |
| Aidan Johnson | Melbourne | | |
| Andy Moniz-Wakefield | Melbourne | | |
| Riley Onley | Melbourne | | |
| Oskar Baker | Western Bulldogs | | |
| Harvey Gallagher | Western Bulldogs | | |
| Lachlan Smith | Western Bulldogs | | |
| Zac Walker | Western Bulldogs | | |
| Zac Williams | Carlton | Delisted on 9 September 2026; Later retired on 8 November 2026 | |
| Elijah Hollands | Carlton | | |
| Lewis Young | Carlton | | |
| Flynn Young | Carlton | | |
| Lachie Fogarty | Carlton | | |
| Jordan Boyd | Carlton | | |
| Harry Charleson | Carlton | | |
| Lucas Camporeale | Carlton | | |
| Ben Camporeale | Carlton | | |
| Jade Gresham | Essendon | | |
| Matt Guelfi | Essendon | | |
| Elijah Tsatas | Essendon | | |
| Saad El-Hawli | Essendon | | |
| Liam McMahon | Essendon | | |
| Chayce Jones | Adelaide | | |
| Lachlan Sholl | Adelaide | | |
| Tyler Welsh | Adelaide | | |
| Jed Bews | Geelong | | |
| George Stevens | Geelong | | |
| Keighton Matofai-Forbes | Geelong | | |
| Henry Hustwaite | Hawthorn | | |
| Bodie Ryan ^{[a]} | Hawthorn | Traded to Melbourne after delisting. | |
| James Blanck | Hawthorn | | |
| Cody Anderson | Hawthorn | | |
| Jaime Uhr-Henry | Hawthorn | | |
| Sam Sturt | Fremantle | | |
| Bailey Banfield | Fremantle | | |
| Ollie Murphy | Fremantle | | |
| Ryda Luke | Fremantle | | |
| Harry Cunningham | Sydney | Will be drafted by Adelaide in the rookie draft. | |
| Tyler Sonsie | Richmond | | |
| Samson Ryan | Richmond | | |
| James Trezise | Richmond | | |
| Jake Stringer | Greater Western Sydney | | |
| Max Ramsden | Hawthorn | | |
| Flynn Perez | Hawthorn | Offered chance to train on for a spot during the Supplemental Selection Period | |
| Ryan Gardner | Western Bulldogs | | |
| Nick Coffield | Western Bulldogs | | |
| Lachlan McNeil | Western Bulldogs | | |
| Tom Anastasopoulos | Port Adelaide | | |
| Ollie Lord | Port Adelaide | | |
| Oliver Hayes-Brown | Richmond | | |
| Steely Green | Richmond | | |
| Jack Williams | West Coast | | |
| Harry Schoenberg | West Coast | | |
| Clay Hall | West Coast | | |
| Nik Cox | Essendon | | |
| Tom Edwards | Essendon | | |
| Kayle Gerreyn | Essendon | | |
| Mitch Knevitt | Geelong | Drafted by Sydney with Pick 46 in 2026 National Draft | |
| Cooper Harvey | North Melbourne | | |
| Zac Fisher | North Melbourne | | |
| Luke Urquhart | North Melbourne | | |
| Conor Stone | Greater Western Sydney | | |
| Harrison Coe | Collingwood | | |
| Noah Howes | Collingwood | | |
| Harry DeMattia | Collingwood | Club Committed to re-signing in Rookie Draft | |
| Matthew Owies | West Coast | | |
| Adam Saad | Carlton | | |
| Jack Carroll | St Kilda | | |
| Darragh Joyce | Brisbane Lions | | |
| Luke Beecken | Brisbane Lions | | |
| Koby Evans | Brisbane Lions | Club Committed to re-signing in Rookie Draft | |
| Luke Lloyd | Brisbane Lions | Club Committed to re-signing in Rookie Draft | |
| Riley Garcia | Western Bulldogs | Club Committed to re-signing in Rookie Draft | |
| Jaren Carr | Fremantle | Club Committed to re-signing in Rookie Draft | |
| Jamarra Ugle-Hagan | Gold Coast | Delisted and redrafted in the 2026 National Draft | |
| Elliott Himmelberg | Gold Coast | Delisted and redrafted in the 2026 National Draft | |
| Ryan Byrnes | St Kilda | Club Committed to re-signing in Rookie Draft | |
| Dan Butler | St Kilda | Club Committed to re-signing in Rookie Draft | |

== Essendon concessions ==
Due to the club's poor on-field results since 2025, the AFL announced draft concessions for Essendon which included:

- Two extra Category A Rookie list spots.

== Tasmania concessions ==
As part of Tasmania's entry into the AFL in 2028, they have been provided with several draft concessions, including being able to sign up to eight 17-year-olds in each of 2026 and 2027, with a maximum of 12 total across the two years and being able to sign Tasmanian players from the 2026 draft class.

Table of Tasmania concession signings
| Player | Recruited From | League | Type | Ref |
|---|---|---|---|---|
| Axel Walsh | East Perth | WAFL | 17 year old | |
| Angus Brown | Sandringham Dragons | Talent League | 17 year old | |
| Riley Stratford | Sandringham Dragons | Talent League | 17 year old | |
| Griffin Barker | Western Jets | Talent League | 17 year old | |
| Jake Miller | Western Jets | Talent League | 17 year old | |
| Nate Jenkins | Calder Cannons | Talent League | 17 year old | |
| Baxter Sruk | Eastern Ranges | Talent League | 17 year old | |
| Hugh McCallum | Tasmania Devils | VFL | Tasmanian signing | |

== 2026 national draft ==
Draft order prior to the draft

Table of national draft selections
| Round | Pick | Club | Notes | | | |
|---|---|---|---|---|---|---|
| Round | Pick | Club | Notes | 1 | 1 | Essendon |
| 2 | Richmond | | | 1 | | |
| 3 | West Coast | | | 1 | | |
| 4 | Melbourne | ←Port Adelaide | | 1 | | |
| 5 | Richmond | ←Port Adelaide Free Agency compensation pick (Butters) | | 1 | | |
| 6 | Sydney | ←North Melbourne | | 1 | | |
| 7 | Port Adelaide | ←Melbourne←Gold Coast (2025) | | 1 | | |
| 8 | Gold Coast | Free Agency compensation pick (King) | | 1 | | |
| 9 | Greater Western Sydney | | | 1 | | |
| 10 | St Kilda | | | 1 | | |
| 11 | Collingwood | | | 1 | | |
| 12 | Port Adelaide | ←Melbourne | | 1 | | |
| 13 | Carlton | | | 1 | | |
| 14 | Melbourne | ←Western Bulldogs | | 1 | | |
| 15 | Adelaide | | | 1 | | |
| 16 | St Kilda | ←Geelong | | 1 | | |
| 17 | Essendon | ←Hawthorn | | 1 | | |
| 18 | Carlton | ←Sydney (2025) | | 1 | | |
| 19 | Fremantle | | | 1 | | |
| 20 | Greater Western Sydney | ←Brisbane Lions | | 1 | | |
| 2 | 21 | Brisbane Lions | ←Essendon | | | |
| 2 | 22 | Port Adelaide | ←Richmond | | | |
| 2 | 23 | West Coast | | | | |
| 2 | 24 | Port Adelaide | | | | |
| 2 | 25 | Essendon | ←Brisbane Lions←Greater Western Sydney←Carlton←North Melbourne (2025) | | | |
| 2 | 26 | Greater Western Sydney | ←Carlton←Gold Coast (2025) | | | |
| 2 | 27 | Brisbane Lions | ←Essendon←Hawthorn←Greater Western Sydney (2025) | | | |
| 2 | 28 | Brisbane Lions | ←Greater Western Sydney Free Agency compensation pick (Greene) | | | |
| 2 | 29 | Hawthorn | ←West Coast (2025)←St Kilda (2025) | | | |
| 2 | 30 | Collingwood | | | | |
| 2 | 31 | Carlton | ←Greater Western Sydney←Gold Coast (2025)←Melbourne (2025) | | | |
| 2 | 32 | Adelaide | ←Port Adelaide←Carlton (2025) | | | |
| 2 | 33 | North Melbourne | ←Melbourne←Western Bulldogs | | | |
| 2 | 34 | Port Adelaide | ←Adelaide | | | |
| 2 | 35 | Adelaide | Free Agency compensation pick (Butts) | | | |
| 2 | 36 | Geelong | | | | |
| 2 | 37 | Hawthorn | | | | |
| 2 | 38 | Sydney | | | | |
| 2 | 39 | Sydney | Free Agency compensation pick (Amartey) | | | |
| 2 | 40 | Fremantle | | | | |
| 2 | 41 | St Kilda | ←Brisbane Lions | | | |
| 2 | 42 | Western Bulldogs | ←Brisbane Lions Free Agency compensation pick (Neale) | | | |
| 3 | 43 | Adelaide | ←Gold Coast (2025)←Essendon (2025) | | | |
| 3 | 44 | Richmond | | | | |
| 3 | 45 | Brisbane Lions | ←Melbourne←West Coast | | | |
| 3 | 46 | Port Adelaide | | | | |
| 3 | 47 | Sydney | ←North Melbourne | | | |
| 3 | 48 | Melbourne | ←Port Adelaide←Gold Coast (2025) | | | |
| 3 | 49 | North Melbourne | ←Melbourne←Greater Western Sydney (2025) | | | |
| 3 | 50 | Carlton | ←Greater Western Sydney Free Agency compensation pick (Briggs) | | | |
| 3 | 51 | Melbourne | ←North Melbourne←Sydney←Collingwood (2025) | | | |
| 3 | 52 | Western Bulldogs | ←Brisbane Lions←Collingwood (2025)←Melbourne (2025) | | | |
| 3 | 53 | Western Bulldogs | | | | |
| 3 | 54 | Adelaide | | | | |
| 3 | 55 | Geelong | | | | |
| 3 | 56 | West Coast | ←Hawthorn (2025)←Sydney (2025) | | | |
| 3 | 57 | Greater Western Sydney | ←Brisbane Lions←Hawthorn (2025) | | | |
| 3 | 58 | Fremantle | | | | |
| 3 | 59 | Carlton | ←Carlton←Brisbane Lions (2025) | | | |
| 4 | 60 | Geelong | ←Essendon | | | |
| 4 | 61 | Fremantle | ←Richmond | | | |
| 4 | 62 | North Melbourne | | | | |
| 4 | 63 | Collingwood | ←Gold Coast | | | |
| 4 | 64 | Collingwood | ←Greater Western Sydney (2025) | | | |
| 4 | 65 | Collingwood | | | | |
| 4 | 66 | Hawthorn | ←Melbourne (2025) | | | |
| 4 | 67 | Carlton | | | | |
| 4 | 68 | Fremantle | | | | |
| 5 | 69 | Essendon | | | | |
| 5 | 70 | Gold Coast | ←Richmond (2025) | | | |
| 5 | 71 | Western Bulldogs | ←Port Adelaide | | | |
| 5 | 72 | Gold Coast | | | | |
| 5 | 73 | Carlton | | | | |
| 5 | 74 | Hawthorn | | | | |
| 6 | 75 | Essendon | | | | |
| 6 | 76 | Richmond | | | | |
| 6 | 77 | Gold Coast | | | | |
| 7 | 78 | Essendon | | | | |
| 7 | 79 | Melbourne | | | | |
| 8 | 80 | Essendon | | | | |

Table of national draft selections
| Round | Pick | Player | Club | Recruited from | | Notes |
| Round | Pick | Player | Club | Club | League | Notes |
|---|---|---|---|---|---|---|
| 1 | 1 | Dougie Cochrane | Port Adelaide | Central District | SANFL | Next Generation Academy selection, matched bid by Essendon |
| 1 | 2 | Ethan Drever | Essendon | GWV Rebels | Talent League | |
| 1 | 3 | Cody Walker | Carlton | Bendigo Pioneers | Talent League | Father–son selection (son of Andrew Walker), matched bid by Richmond |
| 1 | 4 | Arki Butler | Richmond | Sandringham Dragons | Talent League | |
| 1 | 5 | Heath Mellody | West Coast | Claremont | WAFL | |
| 1 | 6 | Ethan Matthews | Greater Western Sydney | GWS Academy | Talent League | Academy selection, matched bid by Melbourne |
| 1 | 7 | Mitch Harris | Melbourne | Woodville-West Torrens | SANFL | ←Port Adelaide |
| 1 | 8 | Harry Van Hattum | Richmond | Northern Knights | Talent League | ←Port Adelaide Free Agency compensation pick (Butters) |
| 1 | 9 | Caylen Murray | Sydney | Brisbane Lions Academy | Talent League | ←Greater Western Sydney; Academy eligible for Brisbane Lions, but they did not match Sydney's bid |
| 1 | 10 | Leo Steed | Gold Coast | Swan Districts | WAFL | Free Agency compensation pick (King) |
| 1 | 11 | Gus Teixeira | St Kilda | Sandringham Dragons | Talent League | |
| 1 | 12 | Sam Gayfer | Collingwood | Northern Knights | Talent League | |
| 1 | 13 | Jake Eime | Greater Western Sydney | Central District | SANFL | |
| 1 | 14 | Toby Krasna | Adelaide | Northern Knights | Talent League | ←Carlton |
| 1 | 15 | Lachlan Burrows | Melbourne | Sandringham Dragons | Talent League | ←Western Bulldogs |
| 1 | 16 | Tyson Bradley | St Kilda | Sandringham Dragons | Talent League | ←Geelong |
| 1 | 17 | Archie Elliott | Essendon | GWV Rebels | Talent League | ←Hawthorn |
| 1 | 18 | George Dimer | Fremantle | Sandringham Dragons | Talent League | |
| 1 | 19 | Clancy Snell | Port Adelaide | Gippsland Power | Talent League | ←Greater Western Sydney←Brisbane Lions |
| 2 | 20 | Wil Malady | Port Adelaide | Gippsland Power | Talent League | ←Brisbane Lions←Essendon |
| 2 | 21 | Harvie Cooke | Essendon | Northern Knights | Talent League | Bidding compensation pick |
| 2 | 22 | Noah Williams | Richmond | Geelong Falcons | Talent League | Bidding compensation pick |
| 2 | 23 | George Gale | North Melbourne | Claremont | WAFL | ←West Coast |
| 2 | 24 | Jake Soutar | West Coast | East Perth | WAFL | Bidding compensation pick |
| 2 | 25 | Wil Antrobus | Port Adelaide | Dandenong Stingrays | Talent League | |
| 2 | 26 | Jack Pickett | Essendon | Geelong Falcons | Talent League | ←Brisbane Lions←Greater Western Sydney←Carlton←North Melbourne (2025) |
| 2 | 27 | Kodah Edwards | Brisbane Lions | South Adelaide | SANFL | |
| 2 | 28 | Archie Van Dyk | Brisbane Lions | South Adelaide | SANFL | ←Essendon←Hawthorn←Greater Western Sydney (2025) |
| 2 | 29 | Jackson Phillips | Brisbane Lions | Dandenong Stingrays | Talent League | ←Greater Western Sydney Free Agency compensation pick (Greene) |
| 2 | 30 | Benji van Rooyen | Hawthorn | Claremont | WAFL | ←West Coast (2025)←St Kilda (2025) |
| 2 | 31 | Gus Kennedy | Collingwood | Dandenong Stingrays | Talent League | |
| 2 | 32 | Harvey Spawton-Guy | Carlton | West Perth | WAFL | ←Greater Western Sydney←Gold Coast (2025)←Melbourne (2025) |
| 2 | 33 | Khaled el Souki | Western Bulldogs | Western Jets | Talent League | Next Generation Academy selection, matched bid by Adelaide |
| 2 | 34 | Xavier Ladbrook | Adelaide | Gippsland Power | Talent League | ←Port Adelaide←Carlton (2025) |
| 2 | 35 | Seb Marsic | North Melbourne | Oakleigh Chargers | Talent League | ←Melbourne←Western Bulldogs |
| 2 | 36 | Archie Spencer | Brisbane Lions | Eastern Ranges | Talent League | ←Port Adelaide←Adelaide |
| 2 | 37 | Jackson Watkins | Carlton | Calder Cannons | Talent League | ←Adelaide Free Agency compensation pick (Butts) |
| 2 | 38 | Lachlan Hicks | Geelong | Western Jets | Talent League | |
| 2 | 39 | Gabe Patterson | Port Adelaide | Glenelg | SANFL | ←Hawthorn |
| 2 | 40 | Brady Wright | Sydney | Werribee | VFL | |
| 2 | 41 | Jordan Knapp | Collingwood | Eastern Ranges | Talent League | ←Sydney Free Agency compensation pick (Amartey) |
| 2 | 42 | Kane Johnston | Fremantle | Perth | WAFL | |
| 2 | 43 | Lewis Houndsome | St Kilda | Northern Knights | Talent League | ←Brisbane Lions |
| 3 | 44 | Sam Tassone | Adelaide | North Adelaide | SANFL | ←Gold Coast (2025)←Essendon (2025) |
| 3 | 45 | Andrio Sousa | Greater Western Sydney | Dandenong Stingrays | Talent League | ←Richmond |
| 3 | 46 | Ethan Herbert | Carlton | North Adelaide | SANFL | ←Richmond←Greater Western Sydney←Brisbane Lions |
| 3 | 47 | Angus White | Port Adelaide | South Adelaide | SANFL | |
| 3 | 48 | Mitch Knevitt | Sydney | Geelong | AFL | ←North Melbourne |
| 3 | 49 | Ben Forster | Melbourne | Sandringham Dragons | Talent League | ←Port Adelaide←Gold Coast (2025) |
| 3 | 50 | Jack Riding | Western Bulldogs | Werribee | VFL | ←North Melbourne←Melbourne←Greater Western Sydney (2025) |
| 3 | 51 | Harry Franz | Richmond | Glenelg | SANFL | ←Carlton←Greater Western Sydney Free Agency compensation pick (Briggs) |
| 3 | 52 | Kaie Sullivan | Melbourne | Dandenong Stingrays | Talent League | ←North Melbourne←Sydney←Collingwood (2025) |
| 3 | 53 | Sam Devers | Western Bulldogs | Eastern Ranges | Talent League | ←Brisbane Lions←Collingwood (2025)←Melbourne (2025) |
| 3 | 54 | Aidan McCartney | North Melbourne | Sydney Swans Academy | Talent League | Father–son selection (son of Jason McCartney), matched bid by Geelong |
| 3 | 55 | Blake Justice | Essendon | Calder Cannons | Talent League | Next Generation Academy selection, matched bid by Geelong |
| 3 | 56 | Anthony Long | Geelong | West Adelaide | SANFL | Next Generation Academy eligible for Adelaide, but they did not match Geelong's bid |
| 3 | 57 | Jake Medved | Fremantle | Sydney Swans Academy | Talent League | Academy eligible for Sydney, but they did not match Fremantle's bid |
| 4 | 58 | Cooper Hodge | Hawthorn | Brisbane Lions | VFL | Father–son selection (son of Luke Hodge), matched bid by Geelong |
| 4 | 59 | Keenan Boi | Hawthorn | Gippsland Power | Talent League | Next Generation Academy selection, matched bid by Geelong |
| 4 | 60 | Zach Stevens | Geelong | Geelong | VFL | ←Essendon |
| 4 | 61 | Mason McGroder | Sydney | Sydney Swans Academy | Talent League | Academy selection, matched bid by Collingwood |
| 4 | 62 | Koby LeCras | Collingwood | West Perth | WAFL | ←Gold Coast |
| 4 | 63 | Elliott Himmelberg | Gold Coast | Gold Coast | AFL | Redrafted player ←Richmond (2025) |
| 4 | 64 | Jamarra Ugle-Hagan | Gold Coast | Gold Coast | AFL | Redrafted player |
| 4 | 74 | Harper Banfield | West Coast | Claremont | WAFL | Father–son selection (son of Drew Banfield) |

=== Rookie elevations ===
Table of rookie elevations
| Player | Club | Ref. |
|---|---|---|
| Shadeau Brain | Brisbane Lions | |
| Bruce Reville | Brisbane Lions | |
| Isaiah Dudley | Fremantle | |
| Patrick Voss | Fremantle | |
| Nick Madden | Greater Western Sydney | |
| Paddy Cross | Melbourne | |
| Cooper Trembath | North Melbourne | |
| Mykelti Lefau | Richmond | |
| Liam O'Connell | St Kilda | |
| Will Edwards | Sydney | |
| Jack Hutchinson | West Coast | |
| Deven Robertson | West Coast | |
| Lachlan Bramble | Western Bulldogs | |

== 2027 rookie draft ==
=== Category B Rookie selections ===
The AFL introduced an additional Category B rookie spot for all clubs to be able to draft an Indigenous or First Nations player to their lists for the 2027 season. Previously, clubs could only list up to two Category B rookie players; however, they will now be able to sign a third player, provided that player is Indigenous.

Table of Category B rookie selections
| Name | Club | Origin | Note | Date Signed | Ref |
|---|---|---|---|---|---|
| Finnbarr Roarty | Collingwood | Donegal GAA | International signing (Ireland) | 14 October 2026 | |
| James Bell | Greater Western Sydney | Greater Western Sydney (VFL) | First Nations signing Delisted by Sydney in 2022 | | |
| Oliver Purcell | Hawthorn | UTS Balmain Tigers (AWPL) | Three-year non-registered player (water polo) | 5 October 2026 | |
| Patrick Carr | Richmond | UT Tyler Patriots (NCAA) | Three-year non-registered player (basketball) | 28 May 2026 | |

== Footnotes ==
- a^{1} ^{2} Bodie Ryan was originally delisted by Hawthorn on September 23. However he was still traded to Melbourne as the list lodgement date had not come yet so his contract had not officially expired.

== See also ==
- 2026 AFL Women's draft
