= Puncher =

Puncher may refer to:

- HMS Puncher (D79), Archer-class patrol vessel of the Royal Navy
- HMS Puncher (P291), Bogue-class escort carrier built for the US Navy
- Liam Puncher (born 2003), Australian rules footballer

== See also ==
- Punch (disambiguation)
- Puncture (disambiguation)
