= Joel Amartey =

Australian football league player (born 1999)

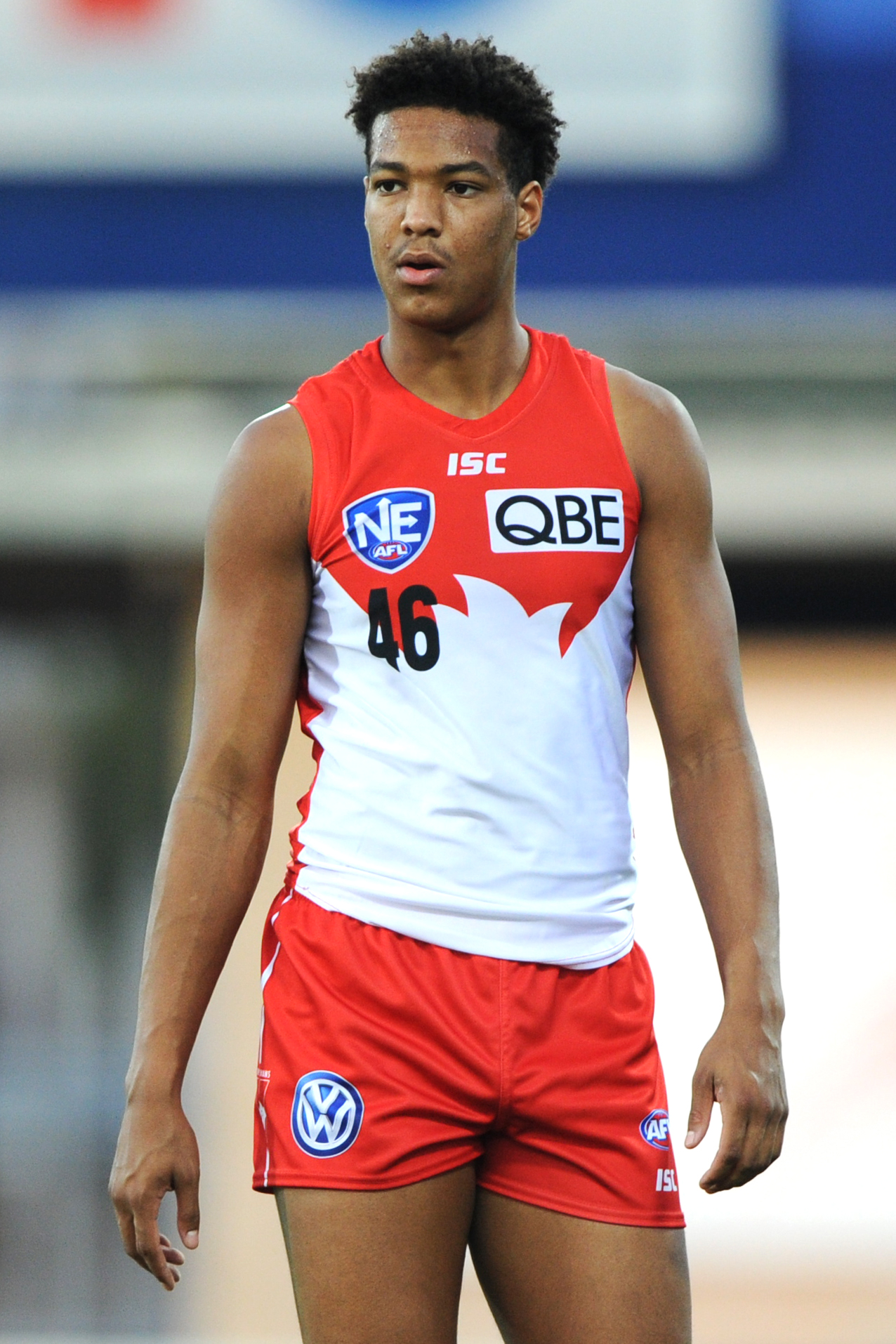
- Amartey in 2018

Personal information
- Nicknames: Baz, The Party
- Born: 2 September 1999 (age 27); Beaumaris, Victoria
- Original team: Sandringham Dragons (NAB League)/Beaumaris
- Draft: No. 28, 2018 AFL rookie draft, Sydney
- Debut: 13 September 2020, Sydney vs. Brisbane Lions, at Cazaly's Stadium
- Height: 195 cm (6 ft 5 in)
- Weight: 98 kg (216 lb)
- Position: Key forward

Club information
- Current club: Carlton
- Number: 20

Playing career^{1}
Years	Club	Games (Goals)
2018–2026	Sydney	76 (114)
2027–	Carlton	0 (0)
Total		76 (114)
- ^{1} Playing statistics correct to the end of the 2026 season.

Career highlights
- Sydney leading goalkicker: 2024

Joel Amartey (born 2 September 1999) is an Australian rules footballer who plays for the Carlton Football Club in the Australian Football League (AFL). He was originally recruited by the Swans with the 28th draft pick in the 2018 AFL rookie draft.

== Early football ==
Amartey was born in Australia to a father who had migrated from Ghana. He grew up in the Melbourne suburb of Bentleigh. As a child, he played soccer, but quit after experiencing racial abuse, moving instead to basketball and later to Australian rules. He played junior football for the Bentleigh Demons, Ormond and Beaumaris Sharks in the South Metro Junior Football League. Amartey also played football at Mentone Grammar. He played for the Sandringham Dragons in the NAB League, playing 14 games and kicking 9 goals over the course of the 2017 season. Amartey had the opportunity to win the grand final for the Dragons in their premiership match against the Geelong Falcons as he marked in front of goal with seconds left, meaning he had to kick a goal after the siren. However, he missed the shot, and the Dragons lost by two points.

== AFL career ==
=== Sydney (2018–2026) ===
Amartey was likely to make his AFL debut in July 2020, but suffered a groin injury in a scratch match and was unable to debut for the Swans. Amartey debuted in Sydney's 32 point loss to Brisbane Lions in the 17th round of the 2020 AFL season. On debut, Amartey collected 3 disposals, 8 hitouts, and 2 tackles. Amartey was upgraded from the rookie list at the conclusion of the season.

In Round 5 of the 2023 AFL season Amartey pulled his hamstring while running towards the forward line. Amartey was immediately substituted out of the game.

In 2024, he scored a career best 9 goals during the last three quarters of Sydney's Round 14 clash against the Adelaide Crows, and ended the season as Sydney's leading goalkicker for the first time. He kicked the match-winning goal in the 2024 qualifying final against Greater Western Sydney, and went on to play in the 2024 AFL Grand Final against the Brisbane Lions. Amartey missed large parts of the 2025 season with an adductor strain, playing only eight games. He made a strong return early in 2026, including five goals against reigning premiers Brisbane. Amartey then suffered a partial tear to his Achilles tendon, not featuring for the Swans again after his round 16 injury.

Following Sydney's preliminary final exit in 2026, Amartey expressed his intentions to move to Carlton as a free agent during the off-season.

=== Carlton (2027–present) ===
Amartey officially joined the Carlton Football Club on the 2nd of October as an unrestricted free agent.

== Statistics ==
Updated to the end of the 2026 season.

Legend
G	Goals	K	Kicks	D	Disposals	T	Tackles
B	Behinds	H	Handballs	M	Marks	H/O	Hit-outs

Season	Team	No.	Games	Totals								Averages (per game)								Votes
Season	Team	No.	Games	G	B	K	H	D	M	T	H/O	G	B	K	H	D	M	T	H/O	Votes
2018	Sydney	46	0	—	—	—	—	—	—	—	—	—	—	—	—	—	—	—	—	0
2019	Sydney	46	0	—	—	—	—	—	—	—	—	—	—	—	—	—	—	—	—	0
2020 (Note: The 2020 season was played with 17 home-and-away matches per team (down from 22) and 16-minute quarters with time on (down from 20-minute quarters with time on) due to the impact of the COVID-19 pandemic.)	Sydney	46	1	0	0	3	0	3	0	2	8	0.0	0.0	3.0	0.0	3.0	0.0	2.0	8.0	0
2021	Sydney	36	6	5	3	38	17	55	16	23	49	0.8	0.5	6.3	2.8	9.2	2.7	3.8	8.2	0
2022	Sydney	36	6	5	3	29	14	43	12	14	18	0.8	0.5	4.8	2.3	7.2	2.0	2.3	3.0	0
2023	Sydney	36	15	20	15	78	39	117	58	25	46	1.3	1.0	5.2	2.6	7.8	3.9	1.7	3.1	4
2024	Sydney	36	25	43	26	139	54	193	79	49	9	1.7	1.0	5.6	2.2	7.7	3.2	2.0	0.4	3
2025	Sydney	36	8	13	14	49	22	71	34	16	9	1.6	1.8	6.1	2.8	8.9	4.3	2.0	1.1	0
2026	Sydney	36	15	28	18	79	44	123	48	26	14	1.9	1.2	5.3	2.9	8.2	3.2	1.7	0.9	1
Career			76	114	79	415	190	605	247	155	153	1.5	1.0	5.5	2.5	8.0	3.3	2.0	2.0	8
