= Max Ramsden =

Australian rules footballer (born 2003)

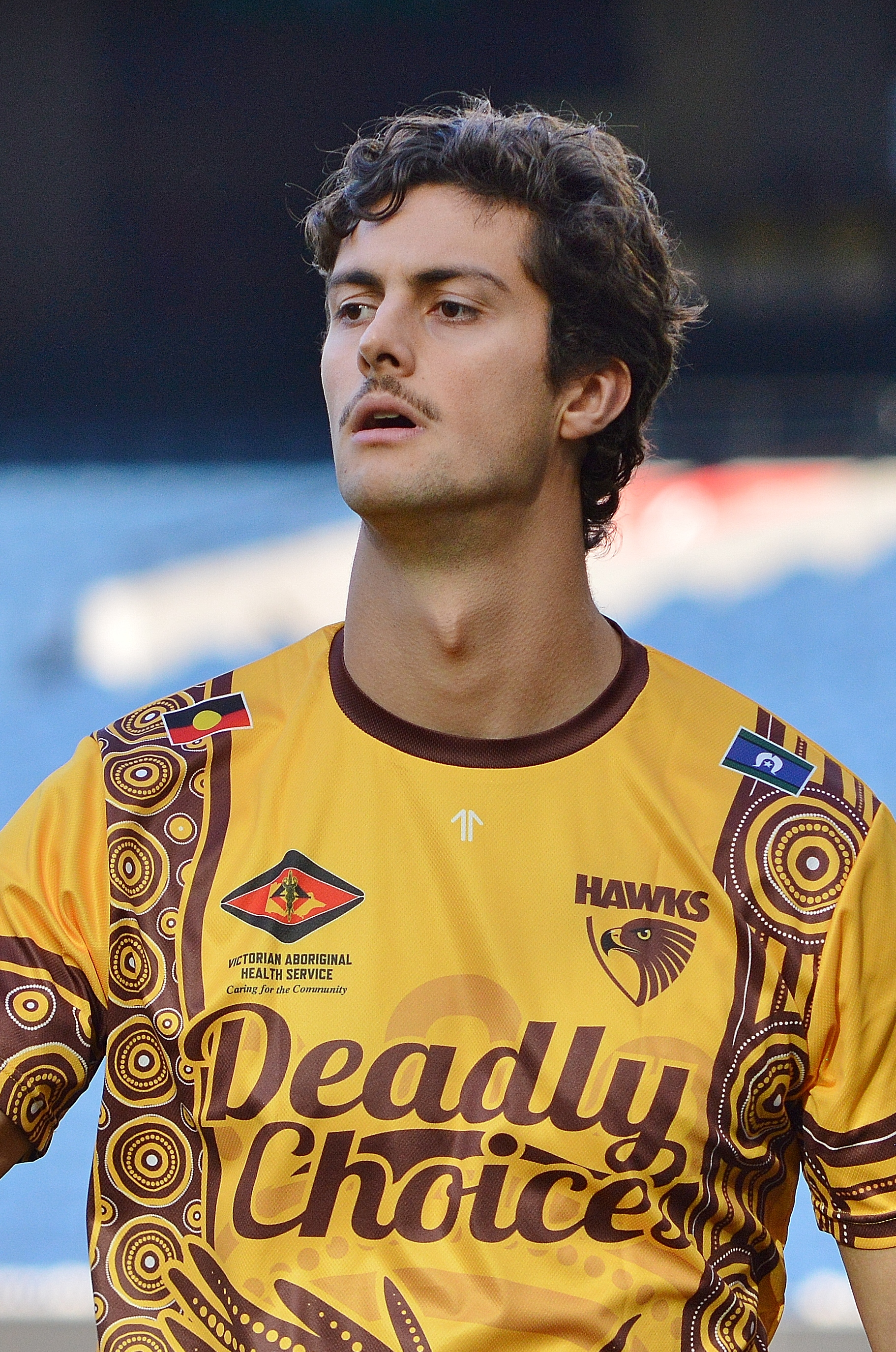
- Ramsden in May 2026

Personal information
- Born: 19 April 2003 (age 23)
- Original teams: Sandringham Dragons, Box Hill
- Draft: No. 6, 2022 mid-season rookie draft
- Debut: Round 7, 2023, Hawthorn vs. Western Bulldogs, at Marvel Stadium
- Height: 203 cm (6 ft 8 in)
- Weight: 86 kg (190 lb)
- Position: Forward/Ruckman

Playing career^{1}
Years	Club	Games (Goals)
2022–2026	Hawthorn	11 (6)
2027–	St Kilda	0 (0)
- ^{1} Playing statistics correct to the end of 2026.

Career highlights
- VFL premiership player: 2026

Max Ramsden (born 19 April 2003) is a professional Australian rules footballer who plays for the St Kilda Football Club in the Australian Football League (AFL).

== Early career ==
Max Ramsden started as a junior at South Melbourne Districts under-9s in the South Metro Junior Football League (SMJFL). A keen Hawthorn supporter, he played for several years rising thought the age groups before concentrating on basketball. A handy basketballer, he played representative basketball for the Melbourne Tigers. After the lifting of Covid restrictions, Ramsden decided to play football because his friends all were playing. On a recommendation from his school's sporting coach, Ramsden joined the Sandringham Dragons. Ramsden time at the Dragons he became one of the most talked about prospects in the lead up to the 2022 mid-season draft.

== AFL career ==
Ramsden was the sixth player picked in the 2022 mid-season draft, having made an impression playing for Sandringham Dragons in the under 18 competition. By being drafted he lined up with Box Hill Hawks in the Victorian Football League. It was a fast learning curve, but with improvement he show some of the potential that the selectors had in him. He accepted a two-year contract extension in April 2023. A series of strong performances in 2023 led to the debut on round 7 2023 against Western Bulldogs at Marvel Stadium.

Dropped after the one game, Ramsden returned to the VFL for further development.

Ramsden was delisted by Hawthorn at the end of the 2026 season, but asked to continue training in the hope of receiving a lifeline in the pre-season Supplemental Selection Period. He was signed by St Kilda as a delisted free agent.

== Study ==
He is currently studying commerce at Melbourne University

== Statistics ==
Updated to the end of 2026.

Legend
G	Goals	K	Kicks	D	Disposals	T	Tackles
B	Behinds	H	Handballs	M	Marks	H/O	Hit-outs

Season	Team	No.	Games	Totals								Averages (per game)								Votes
Season	Team	No.	Games	G	B	K	H	D	M	T	H/O	G	B	K	H	D	M	T	H/O	Votes
2023	Hawthorn	38	2	0	1	5	9	14	5	0	14	0.0	0.5	2.5	4.5	7.0	2.5	0.0	7.0	0
2024	Hawthorn	38	3	1	0	7	10	17	7	6	11	0.3	0.0	2.3	3.3	5.7	2.3	2.0	3.7	0
2025	Hawthorn	38	4	4	3	24	12	36	15	7	12	1.0	0.8	6.0	3.0	9.0	3.8	1.8	3.0	0
2026	Hawthorn	38	2	1	1	6	13	19	6	1	0	0.5	0.5	3.0	6.5	9.5	3.0	0.5	0.0	0
Career			11	6	5	42	44	86	33	14	37	0.5	0.5	3.8	4.0	7.8	3.0	1.3	3.4	0

== Honours and achievements ==
Team

- McClelland Trophy (Hawthorn): 2024
- VFL premiership player (Box Hill): 2026
