= Xavier Bamert =

Australian rules footballer (born 2007)

Personal information
- Born: 29 January 2007 (age 19)
- Original team: East Malvern JFC
- Draft: No. 5, 2026 mid-season rookie draft
- Height: 185 cm (6 ft 1 in)
- Position: Forward/Midfielder

Club information
- Current club: Port Adelaide
- Number: 46

Playing career
Years	Club	Games (Goals)
2026–	Port Adelaide	10 (6)

Xavier Bamert (born 29 January 2007) is an Australian rules footballer who plays for Port Adelaide in the Australian Football League (AFL).

Bamert was educated at Wesley College in Melbourne and played in the juniors for the East Malvern Knights.

A left-footed forward and midfielder, Bamert won a Talent League premiership with the Sandringham Dragons in 2024, before captaining the team to a grand final loss the following season. He missed out on selection in the 2025 national draft. Beginning 2026 in the VFL with North Melbourne, Bamert got another opportunity to impress recruiters when he played a match in April against an AFL Academy team at Arden Street Oval.

Bamert was picked up by Port Adelaide with the fifth selection of the 2026 mid-season rookie draft. After playing one SANFL game, Bamert got his maiden AFL call up in his third week at the club, debuting in round 14 against the Sydney Swans. He gained regular selection for the remainder of the season.
