= Joel Fitzgerald =

Australian rules footballer (born 2003)

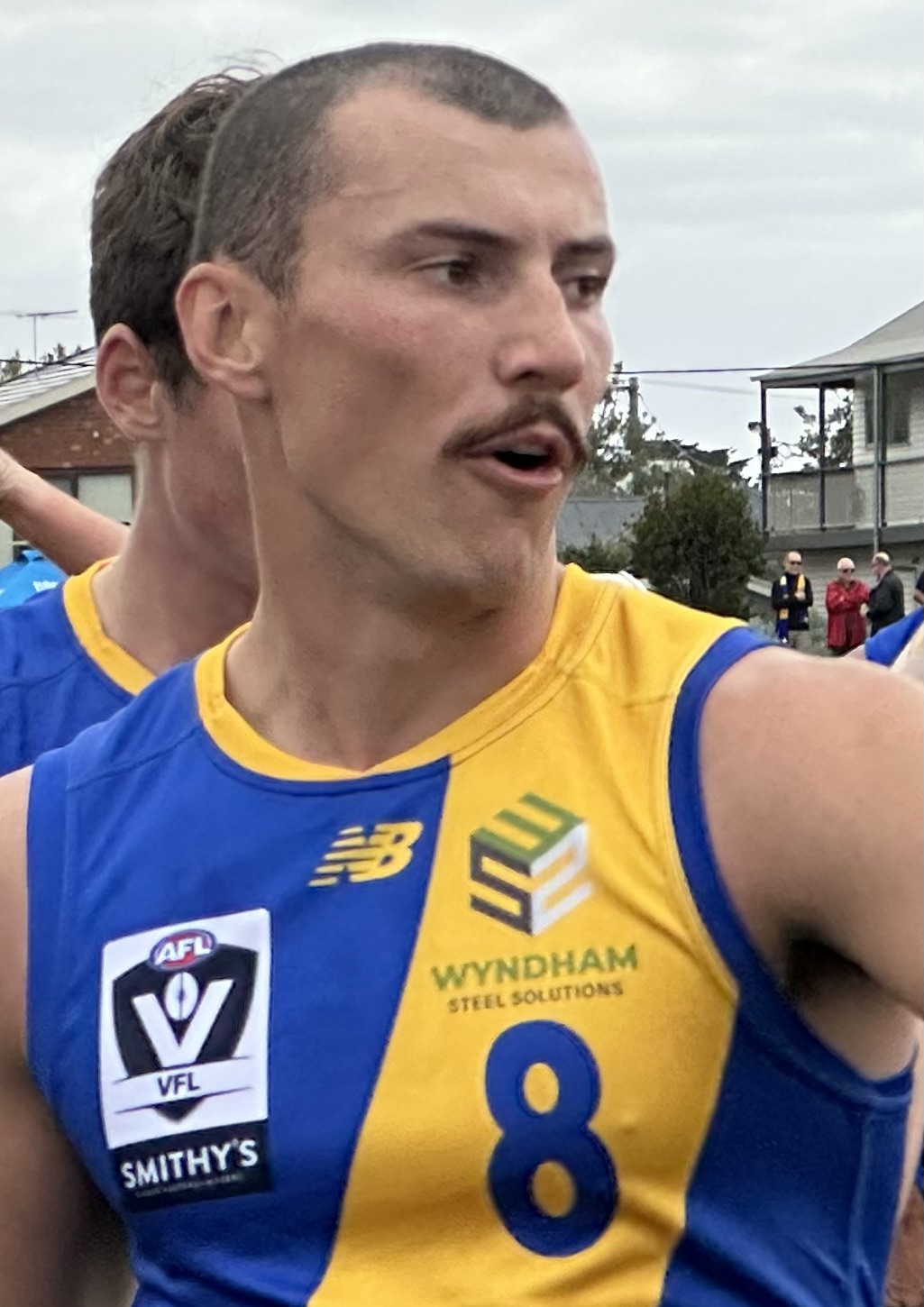
- Fitzgerald with Williamstown in 2026

Personal information
- Born: 8 August 2003 (age 23)
- Original teams: South Morang (NFNL); Yarrambat (NFNL); Northern Knights (Talent League); Essendon (VFL); Bundoora (NFNL); Williamstown (VFL); Hurstbridge (NFNL)
- Draft: No. 16, 2026 mid-season rookie draft
- Debut: Round 14, 2026, Melbourne vs. Essendon, at the MCG
- Height: 189 cm (6 ft 2 in)
- Position: Midfielder

Club information
- Current club: Melbourne
- Number: 47

Playing career^{1}
Years	Club	Games (Goals)
2026–	Melbourne	8 (2)
- ^{1} Playing statistics correct to the end of round 22, 2026.

Joel Fitzgerald (born 8 August 2003) is a professional Australian rules footballer playing for the Melbourne Football Club in the Australian Football League (AFL).

== Pre-AFL career ==
Fitzgerald played junior football in the Northern Football Netball League for South Morang and Yarrambat. He played in the Talent League for the Northern Knights as a medium defender, averaging 28.1 disposals in 2021 and 30 disposals in 2022.

In 2022, Fitzgerald joined the Essendon Football Club in the VFL. Fitzgerald also played for Bundoora in the NFNL over the same time period.

Ahead of the 2024 VFL season, Fitzgerald left Essendon and signed with Williamstown in the VFL. The following year, in 2025, Fitzgerald changed NFNL clubs from Bundoora to Hurstbridge. In 2026, having previously played exclusively at half-back for Williamstown, Fitzgerald made a successful positional move to the midfield which saw him average 34 disposals a game.

== AFL career ==
Fitzgerald was selected by the Melbourne Football Club with pick 16 of the 2026 mid-season rookie draft. He was selected to make his debut in round 14 of the 2026 AFL season. He performed well on debut, having 26 disposals and 5 clearances. At the end of the 2026 season, Fitzgerald placed third in the AFLPA Best First Year Player award, behind Willem Duursma and Harry Dean.

== Statistics ==
Updated to the end of round 22, 2026.

Legend
G	Goals	K	Kicks	D	Disposals	T	Tackles
B	Behinds	H	Handballs	M	Marks

Season	Team	No.	Games	Totals							Averages (per game)							Votes
Season	Team	No.	Games	G	B	K	H	D	M	T	G	B	K	H	D	M	T	Votes
2026	Melbourne	47	8	2	2	80	81	161	17	34	0.3	0.3	10.0	10.1	20.1	2.1	4.3	0
Career			8	2	2	80	81	161	17	34	0.3	0.3	10.0	10.1	20.1	2.1	4.3	0
