= Flynn Riley =

Personal information
- Full name: Flynn Riley
- Born: 5 April 2004 (age 22)
- Original teams: South Morang (NFNL); Montmorency (NFNL); Northern Knights (Talent League); Carlton (VFL); Aberfeldie (EDFL)
- Draft: No. 4, 2026 mid-season rookie draft
- Debut: Round 18, 2026, Carlton vs. Hawthorn, at the MCG
- Height: 209 cm (6 ft 10 in)
- Position: Ruck

Club information
- Current club: Collingwood

Playing career^{1}
Years	Club	Games (Goals)
2026	Carlton	1 (1)
2027–	Collingwood	0 (0)
Total		1 (1)
- ^{1} Playing statistics correct to the end of the 2026 season.

Flynn Riley (born 5 April 2004) is a professional Australian rules footballer who plays for the Collingwood Football Club in the Australian Football League (AFL).

== Pre-AFL career ==
Riley played local football in the Northern Football Netball League for South Morang as a junior, before moving to Montmorency to play senior football. He would later play local football for Aberfeldie in the Essendon District Football League.

Riley also played in the Talent League for the Northern Knights. He averaged 9 disposals and 11.9 hitouts in his draft year in 2022, and 11 disposals and 18.5 hitouts as an over-ager in 2023.

In 2024, Riley joined Carlton in the VFL. He made his VFL debut in round 1 of the 2025 VFL season. At the end of his debut season he received the Carlton Reserves Coaches’ Award.

== AFL career ==
=== Carlton ===
Riley was added to Carlton's AFL list with pick 4 of the 2026 mid-season rookie draft, signing on a six-month deal to the end of 2026. He was selected to make his debut in round 18 of the 2026 AFL season. At the end of the 2026 season, Riley requested a trade to Collingwood.

=== Collingwood ===
In October 2026, Riley was traded to the Collingwood Football Club for a 2028 third-round pick.

== Statistics ==
Updated to the end of the 2026 season.

Legend
G	Goals	K	Kicks	D	Disposals	T	Tackles
B	Behinds	H	Handballs	M	Marks	H/O	Hit-outs

Season	Team	No.	Games	Totals								Averages (per game)								Votes
Season	Team	No.	Games	G	B	K	H	D	M	T	H/O	G	B	K	H	D	M	T	H/O	Votes
2026	Carlton	38	1	1	0	4	2	6	1	5	17	1.0	0.0	4.0	2.0	6.0	1.0	5.0	17.0	0
Career			1	1	0	4	2	6	1	5	17	1.0	0.0	4.0	2.0	6.0	1.0	5.0	17.0	0
