= Brady Grey =

Australian rules footballer (born 1995)

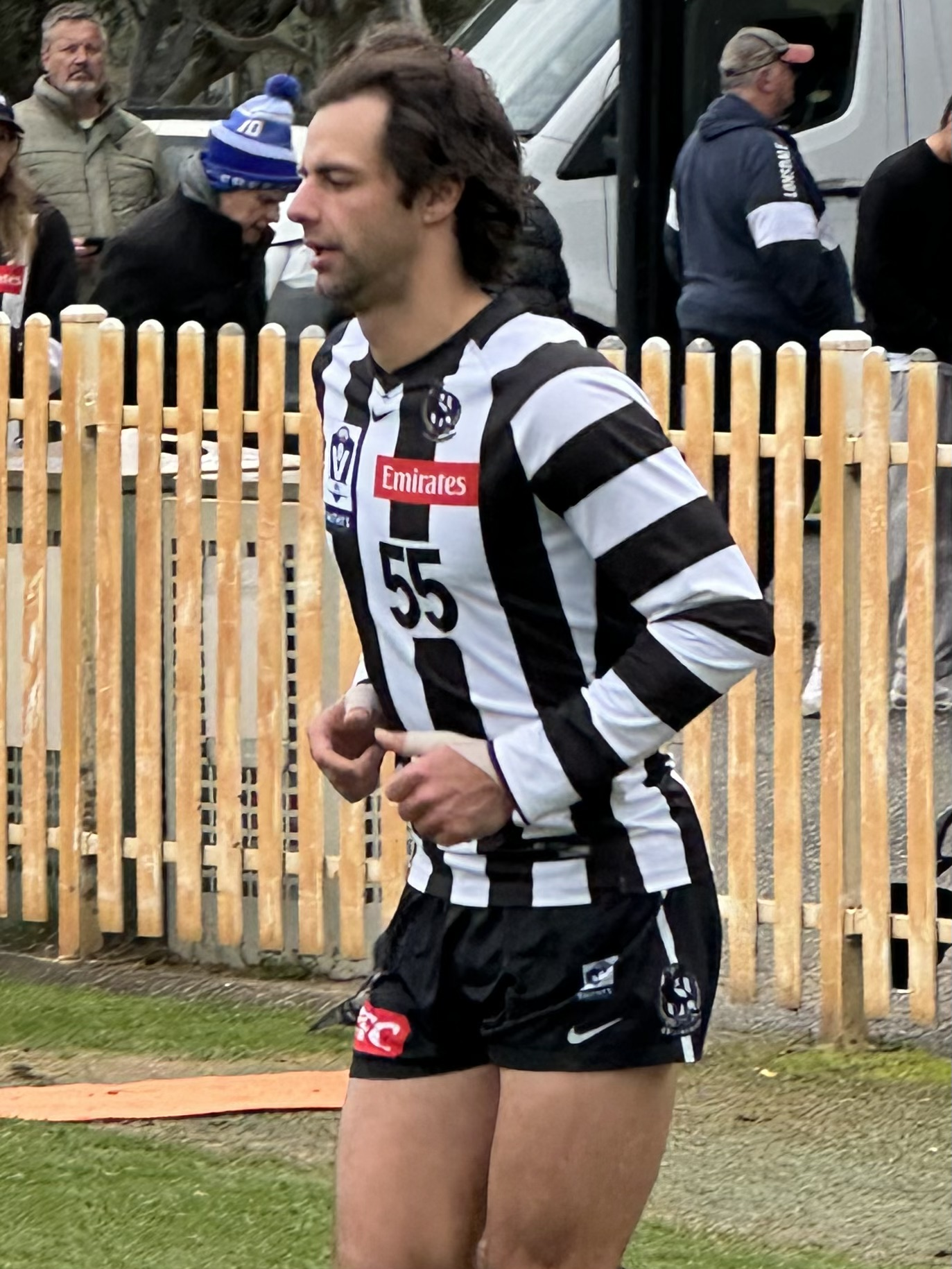
- Grey with Collingwood's VFL team in 2026

Personal information
- Full name: Brady Grey
- Born: 20 July 1995 (age 31)
- Original team: Burnie Dockers Football Club (TSL)
- Draft: No. 58, 2013 national draft
- Height: 182 cm (6 ft 0 in)
- Weight: 87 kg (192 lb)
- Position: Utility

Playing career^{1}
Years	Club	Games (Goals)
2014–2018	Fremantle	21 (11)
- ^{1} Playing statistics correct to the end of 2018.

Career highlights
- WAFL premiership player: 2024

Brady Grey (born 20 July 1995) is an Australian rules footballer who played for the Fremantle Football Club in the Australian Football League (AFL).

Drafted with the 58th selection in the 2013 AFL draft from the Burnie Dockers Football Club in the Tasmanian State League, he played for Peel Thunder in the West Australian Football League (WAFL), Fremantle's reserve team during the 2014 season before suffering a stress fracture in his back in July.

Grey continued to play for Peel throughout 2015, and made his AFL debut for Fremantle in the final round of the 2015 AFL season, when Fremantle sent a weakened team to play Port Adelaide at Adelaide Oval. Twelve changes were made to the team, and Grey was one of four players to make their AFL debuts. He was delisted at the conclusion of the 2016 season, before he was subsequently re-drafted by Fremantle in the 2017 rookie draft. He played 14 games for Fremantle in 2017, but only four more in 2018 before being delisted again at the end of the season.

In 2019, Grey joined the West Coast Eagles's reserves team in the WAFL. However, when the team withdrew from the league in 2020 due to the COVID-19 restrictions, Grey switched to play for Perth. Brady joined the Hawthorn Football Club in February 2022, as the Indigenous Player Development Manager, and an assistant coaching role with the clubs inaugural women's AFLW team. He would leave the Hawks later that year returning to the Fremantle Football Club in Perth as a midfield & development coach. He also joined their WAFL affiliate team Peel Thunder in 2023. Brady was one of Peel's better players during their 2024 WAFL Grand Final victory over the East Perth Royals. In 2025 Grey was recruited by Collingwood as its Indigenous Player Development Manager, a role which was paired with inclusion in the club's VFL team. In March 2026, ahead of the 2026 season, Grey was appointed co-captain of Collingwood's VFL side.
