= Kye Annand =

Australian rules footballer (born 2003)

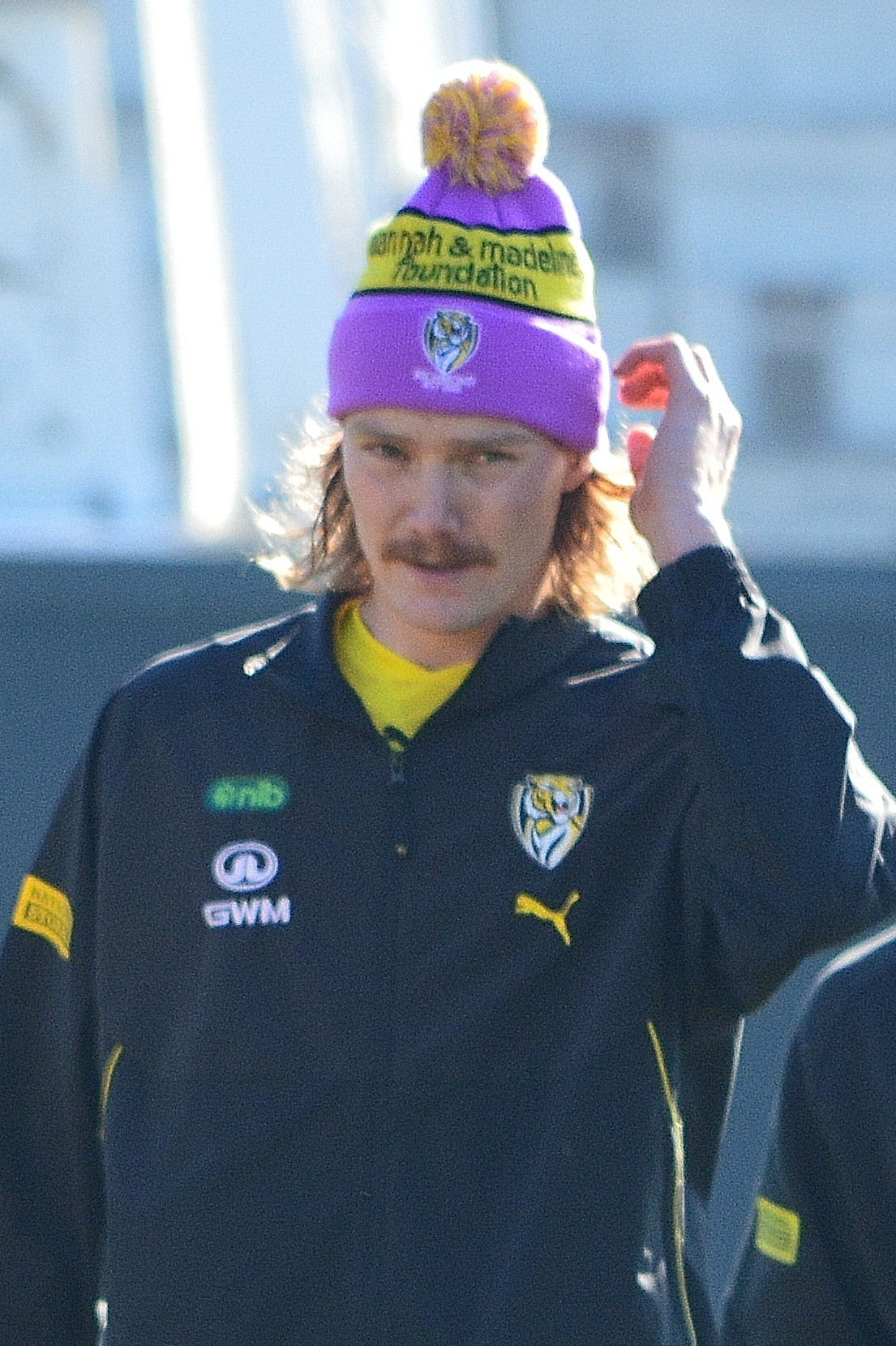
- Annand in August 2026

Personal information
- Born: 14 October 2003 (age 23)
- Original teams: Ocean Grove (BFNL); Geelong West (GFNL); Geelong reserves (VFL)
- Draft: No. 2, 2026 mid-season rookie draft
- Debut: Round 14, 2026, Richmond vs. Brisbane Lions, at Bellerive Oval
- Height: 200 cm (6 ft 7 in)
- Position: Key defender

Club information
- Current club: Richmond
- Number: 41

Playing career^{1}
Years	Club	Games (Goals)
2026–	Richmond	11 (0)
- ^{1} Playing statistics correct to the end of 2026.

Kye Annand (born 14 October 2003) is a professional Australian rules footballer playing for the Richmond Football Club in the Australian Football League (AFL).

== Career ==
=== Early life and VFL career ===
Annand played junior football for the Ocean Grove Cobras. In 2021, he played four games for Ocean Grove's senior side, before becoming their number one ruck the following year and winning the Damian Clark Medal as the side's best and fairest.

In 2023, Annand joined the Geelong reserves team in the Victorian Football League (VFL) ahead of the 2023 VFL season. He played ten games for the Cats throughout 2023. In June 2024, Annand sustained a lacerated kidney whilst playing for Ocean Grove, and subsequently managed just one game with Geelong for the season. In 2026, having spent most of his career as a ruck or key forward option, Annand transitioned to a key defensive position for Geelong. The move saw him receive significant interest from AFL clubs ahead of the 2026 mid-season rookie draft.

=== AFL career ===
Annand was selected by the Richmond Football Club with pick 2 of the 2026 mid-season rookie draft. He was given the jumper number 41, previously worn by Sam Banks. Annand was selected to make his debut in round 14 of the 2026 AFL season, against the Brisbane Lions, at Bellerive Oval.

== Statistics ==
Updated to the end of the 2026 season.

Legend
G	Goals	K	Kicks	D	Disposals	T	Tackles
B	Behinds	H	Handballs	M	Marks

Season	Team	No.	Games	Totals							Averages (per game)							Votes
Season	Team	No.	Games	G	B	K	H	D	M	T	G	B	K	H	D	M	T	Votes
2026	Richmond	41	11	0	0	86	35	121	51	9	0.0	0.0	7.8	3.2	11.0	4.6	0.8	0
Career			11	0	0	86	35	121	51	9	0.0	0.0	7.8	3.2	11.0	4.6	0.8	0
