= Jaxon Artemis =

Australian rules footballer (born 2006)

- Artemis playing for Tasmania in 2026

Personal information
- Born: 24 August 2006 (age 20)
- Original teams: Jandakot (PFL); South Fremantle (WAFL); Tasmania (VFL)
- Draft: No. 1, 2026 mid-season rookie draft
- Debut: Round 19, 2026, Essendon vs. Greater Western Sydney, at Docklands Stadium
- Height: 184 cm (6 ft 0 in)
- Position: Defender

Club information
- Current club: Essendon
- Number: 34

Playing career^{1}
Years	Club	Games (Goals)
2026–	Essendon	4 (0)
- ^{1} Playing statistics correct to the end of round 23, 2026.

Career highlights
- WAFL Premiership player: 2025

Jaxon Artemis (born 24 August 2006) is a professional Australian rules footballer who plays for the Essendon Football Club in the Australian Football League (AFL).

== Pre-AFL career ==
Artemis played junior football for the Jandakot Jets. He played WAFL Futures and WAFL Colts for South Fremantle. In 2024, Artemis represented Western Australia at the Under 18 Championships, where he averaged 15.5 disposals and was Western Australia's MVP.

In 2025, Artemis debuted in the WAFL for South Fremantle. He averaged 13 disposals across 17 games at the level, and was part of South Fremantle's Premiership side.

The next season, Artemis moved from Western Australia to Tasmania, to join the Tasmania Devils in their inaugural VFL season. He made his VFL debut in round 1 of the 2026 VFL season.

== AFL career ==
Artemis was selected by Essendon with pick 1 of the 2026 mid-season rookie draft. He was made his debut in round 19 of the 2026 AFL season.

Artemis ended up playing six games at AFL level for the Bombers in 2026. He also featured for their reserves club at VFL level, including in a semi-final against his former team Tasmania, which Essendon won by 27 points.

== Statistics ==
Updated to the end of round 23, 2026.

Legend
G	Goals	K	Kicks	D	Disposals	T	Tackles
B	Behinds	H	Handballs	M	Marks

Season	Team	No.	Games	Totals							Averages (per game)							Votes
Season	Team	No.	Games	G	B	K	H	D	M	T	G	B	K	H	D	M	T	Votes
2026	Essendon	34	4	0	2	31	27	58	16	8	0.0	0.5	7.8	6.8	14.5	4.0	2.0	0
Career			4	0	2	31	27	58	16	8	0.0	0.5	7.8	6.8	14.5	4.0	2.0	0
