= Lukas Cooke =

Australian rules footballer (born 2003)

Personal information
- Born: 26 September 2003 (age 23)
- Original team: Henley JFC/Lockleys
- Draft: No. 11, 2026 mid-season rookie draft
- Height: 196 cm (6 ft 5 in)
- Position: Key defender

Club information
- Current club: Melbourne
- Number: 46

Playing career
Years	Club	Games (Goals)
2026–	Melbourne	2 (0)

Lukas Cooke (born 26 September 2003) is an Australian rules footballer who plays for Melbourne in the Australian Football League (AFL).

Cooke played his junior football in Adelaide, where he was educated at Westminster School.

A key defender, Cooke was a premiership-winner with the Woodville-West Torrens under-18s and represented South Australia at the 2021 under 19s AFL National Championship, kicking four goals playing up forward against Western Australia. He was overlooked in the 2021 national draft and spent the next five seasons with Woodville-West Torrens, putting together 33 senior games.

Cooke was selected by Melbourne with pick 11 in the 2026 mid-season rookie draft. He made his AFL debut in Melbourne's round 14 win over Essendon at the MCG and suffered a facial fracture when he clashed heads with Ben McKay. Following a period of recovery, Cooke returned in round 20 for a match against Geelong.
