= Puncture =

Puncture, punctured or puncturing may refer to:

- a flat tyre in British English (US English "flat tire" or just "flat")
- Puncture (band), an English punk band
- Puncture (film), a 2011 American film starring Chris Evans

In medicine:

- a penetrating wound caused by pointy objects as nails or needles
- Lumbar puncture, also known as a spinal tap
- Pneumothorax, also known as punctured lung

In other STEM:

- Puncture (topology), the removal of a finite set of points from a manifold
- Punctured neighbourhood, in general topology
- in coding theory, punctured code is code in which some of the bits of the data stream have been removed
- in entomology, the fine pin-prick-like dimples in a carapace

== See also ==
- Punctuality
- Punctuation
