= Samson Ryan =

Australian rules football player

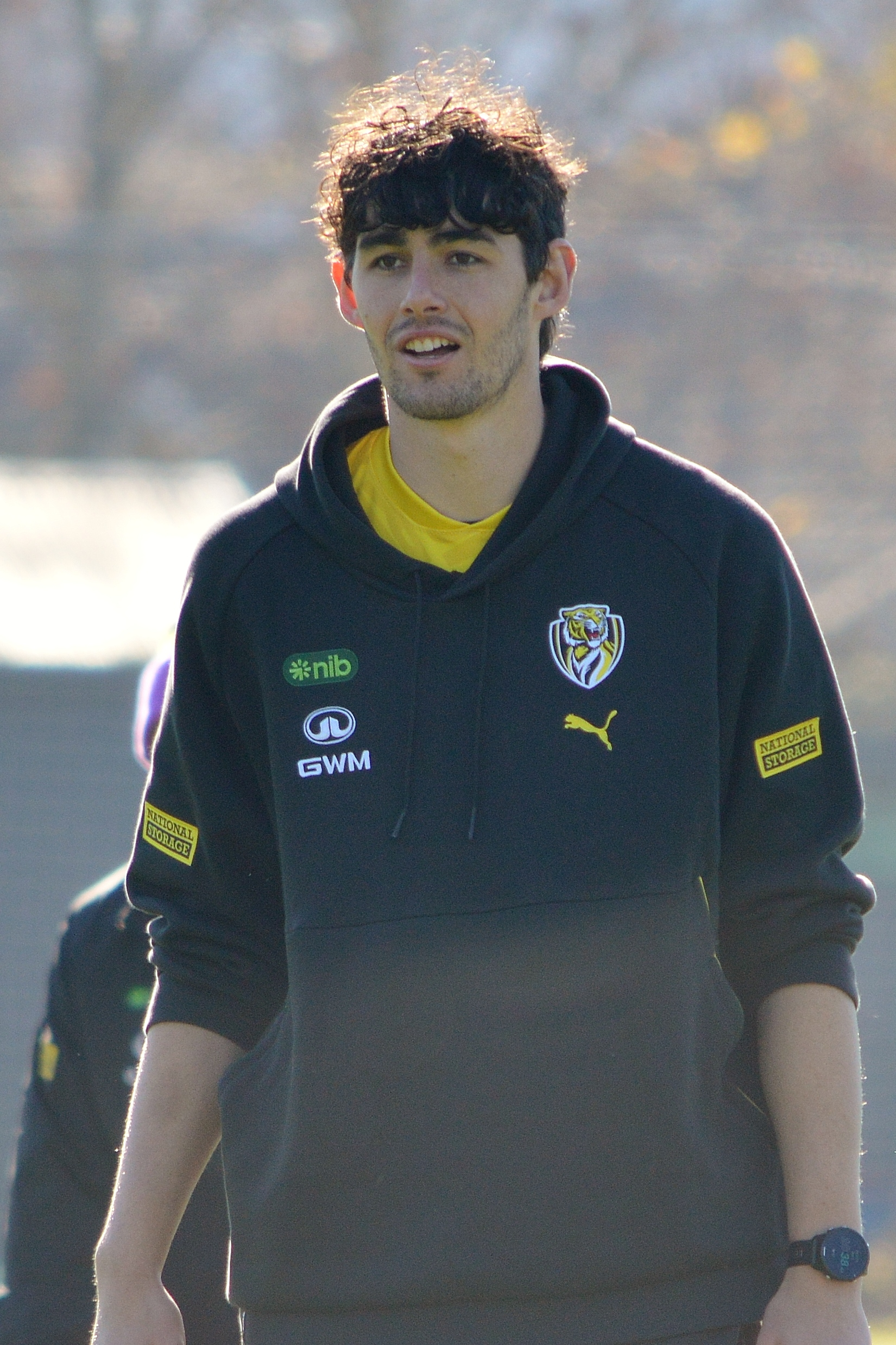
- Ryan in August 2026

Personal information
- Born: 9 December 2000 (age 25); Pambula Hospital
- Original teams: South Toowoomba/Sherwood (QAFL); Redland (NEAFL); Brisbane Lions Academy (NAB League)
- Draft: No. 40, 2020 AFL draft
- Debut: Round 15, 2021, Richmond vs. St Kilda, at MCG
- Height: 206 cm (6 ft 9 in)
- Weight: 105 kg (231 lb)
- Position: Ruck / key forward

Club information
- Current club: North Melbourne
- Number: TBC

Playing career^{1}
| Years | Club | Games (Goals) |
| 2021–2026 | Richmond | 31 (17) |
| 2027– | North Melbourne | 0 (0) |
- ^{1} Playing statistics correct to the end of 2027.

Samson Ryan (born 9 December 2000) is a professional Australian rules footballer who plays for the North Melbourne Football Club in the Australian Football League (AFL).

== Early life, junior football and state-league football ==
Ryan grew up in Merimbula, a coastal town on New South Wales' far south coast. He played football with the Pambula Panthers and the Merimbula in the Sapphire Coast Australian Football League as well as cricket in his pre-teen years, before focusing on cricket in his early teen years. Around that time, he was offered a cricket scholarship to Toowoomba Grammar School, prompting his family to move to Queensland to accept the scholarship.

Ryan returned to football while in Toowoomba and became an impressive prospect, joining the Brisbane Lions Academy program and later representing Queensland at the Under 17 National Championships in 2018.

Ryan played representative football with the Lions Academy side in the 2019 NAB League Boys season, and was named by Aussie Rules Draft Central as the best performed ruck of any of the five competing Academies, after averaging 26 hitouts a game across five matches. That same year, he represented Queensland as part of Allies side at the 2019 AFL Under 18 Championships. In the later part of the season, Ryan played QAFL football with Sherwood Districts and later made his NEAFL debut with Redland.

Though part of the Lions' academy, the club was not given priority access to match any other club's bid on Ryan at the 2019 AFL national draft owing to his relatively late move to Queensland. In any case he was eventually passed over by all 18 clubs.

Ryan intended to return to state-league football in 2020, initially signing with the Canberra Football Club but ultimately being unable to play at the level after the NEAFL season was cancelled as a result of state border closures associated with the COVID-19 pandemic. He returned instead to Sherwood in the QAFL, where he played 10 matches as the club's lead ruck.

=== Junior statistics ===
Legend
| G | Goals | K | Kicks | D | Disposals | T | Tackles |
| B | Behinds | H | Handballs | M | Marks | H/O | Hit-outs |

NAB League Boys

| Season | Team | No. | Games | Totals | | | | | | | | Averages (per game) | | | | | | | |
| Season | Team | No. | Games | G | B | K | H | D | M | T | H/O | G | B | K | H | D | M | T | H/O |
|---|---|---|---|---|---|---|---|---|---|---|---|---|---|---|---|---|---|---|---|
| 2019 | Brisbane Lions Academy | 60 | 5 | 0 | — | 29 | 23 | 52 | 10 | 7 | 129 | 0.0 | — | 5.8 | 4.6 | 10.4 | 2.0 | 1.4 | 25.8 |
| Career | | | 5 | 0 | — | 29 | 23 | 52 | 10 | 7 | 129 | 0.0 | — | 5.8 | 4.6 | 10.4 | 2.0 | 1.4 | 25.8 |

Under 18 National Championships

| Season | Team | No. | Games | Totals | | | | | | | | Averages (per game) | | | | | | | |
| Season | Team | No. | Games | G | B | K | H | D | M | T | H/O | G | B | K | H | D | M | T | H/O |
|---|---|---|---|---|---|---|---|---|---|---|---|---|---|---|---|---|---|---|---|
| 2019 | Allies | 30 | 1 | 0 | — | 1 | 1 | 2 | 0 | 0 | 21 | 0.0 | — | 1.0 | 1.0 | 2.0 | 0.0 | 0.0 | 21.0 |
| Career | | | 1 | 0 | — | 1 | 1 | 2 | 0 | 0 | 21 | 0.0 | — | 1.0 | 1.0 | 2.0 | 0.0 | 0.0 | 21.0 |

== AFL career ==
=== 2021 season ===
Ryan was drafted by Richmond with the club's first pick and the 40th selection overall in the 2020 AFL national draft.

He first represented Richmond as part of the club's reserves side, featuring in VFL pre-season matches in March and April before the season officially began in April. Ryan continued to play in VFL matches during the season proper, kicking three goals in the first official match of the season and playing mostly as a forward during this period. After a four-goal performance in late-May and following an injury to lead AFL ruck Toby Nankervis, Ryan was considered for senior selection but eventually passed over for the club's round 12 match against Essendon. Instead he was given the role as lead ruck at reserves level and after a COVID-19 outbreak induced three-week bye, impressing in the club's next match with 30 hit outs and one goal against Williamstown. Following that match, Ryan was selected to make an AFL debut in round 15's match against St Kilda at the MCG. After a poor performance that including just one hitout and no disposals, Ryan was immediately dropped back to reserves level the following week.

=== 2022 season ===
In 2022, Ryan did not register a senior game for Richmond Football Club, with AFL Tables showing “0” games played for that year. Instead he spent his time developing in the VFL, honing his skills as a forward/ruck. According to the club’s extension announcement in January 2022, he had kicked 17 goals from nine VFL games in 2021 and was seen as a project player with “strong work-ethic and aerial ability”. While he didn’t break into the senior side, this year laid groundwork for his later opportunities.

=== 2023 season ===
In 2023, Ryan made a significant step up: he played 14 senior AFL games, kicked 12 goals, and averaged roughly 12.2 hit-outs per game. Mid-season he was enjoying a run of consecutive appearances (from Round 2 through Round 16) in the senior side and brought dual-role value as a forward who can pinch hit in the ruck. He also dealt with an ankle injury and spent time back in the VFL when form or fitness demanded, but overall 2023 was a clear developmental leap.

=== 2024 season ===
In 2024, Ryan made 8 games for the Richmond Tigers’ senior side, recording 3 goals and averaging just under 7 disposals and about 7.9 hit-outs per game. He suffered an ankle injury and spent significant time at VFL level, which curtailed his ability to build on his 2023 momentum. The club nonetheless extended his contract until 2027, signalling faith in his downward-trajectory recovery and long-term role as a forward-ruck option. Overall, 2024 was a step back in terms of senior game time, though the underlying investment suggests Richmond still view him as part of their future plans.

=== 2025 season ===
In 2025, Ryan featured only 2 senior games, with totals showing 15 disposals and 34 hit-outs across those appearances. He also dealt with a foot injury noted in round 17 by the club medical staff, which affected his availability. At the same time, list commentary ahead of the season suggested he was behind other emerging tall players in the pecking order, which limited his opportunity. In short: 2025 was a low-output year for Ryan at AFL level, signalling the need for him to regain full fitness and significantly improve performance to re-establish himself next year.

=== 2026 season ===
Samson Ryan managed to play six games in 2026, resulting five losses and a win against West Coast. Samson kicked his only two goals in the final game against Geelong.

Ryan was delisted with one year to run on his contract at the conclusion of the 2026 AFL premiership season.

=== North Melbounre ===
He was picked up from the North Melbourne Football Club as a delisted free agent.

== Player profile ==
Ryan plays as a ruck and tall forward. He is notable for his contested marking ability.

== Statistics ==
Updated to the end of round 22, 2026.

Legend
| G | Goals | K | Kicks | D | Disposals | T | Tackles |
| B | Behinds | H | Handballs | M | Marks | H/O | Hit-outs |

| Season | Team | No. | Games | Totals | | | | | | | | Averages (per game) | | | | | | | | Votes |
| Season | Team | No. | Games | G | B | K | H | D | M | T | H/O | G | B | K | H | D | M | T | H/O | Votes |
|---|---|---|---|---|---|---|---|---|---|---|---|---|---|---|---|---|---|---|---|---|
| 2021 | Richmond | 32 | 1 | 0 | 0 | 0 | 0 | 0 | 0 | 0 | 1 | 0.0 | 0.0 | 0.0 | 0.0 | 0.0 | 0.0 | 0.0 | 1.0 | 0 |
| 2022 | Richmond | 32 | 0 | — | — | — | — | — | — | — | — | — | — | — | — | — | — | — | — | 0 |
| 2023 | Richmond | 32 | 14 | 12 | 5 | 66 | 33 | 99 | 40 | 11 | 171 | 0.9 | 0.4 | 4.7 | 2.4 | 7.1 | 2.9 | 0.8 | 12.2 | 0 |
| 2024 | Richmond | 32 | 8 | 3 | 2 | 31 | 21 | 52 | 19 | 7 | 63 | 0.4 | 0.3 | 3.9 | 2.6 | 6.5 | 2.4 | 0.9 | 7.9 | 0 |
| 2025 | Richmond | 32 | 2 | 0 | 0 | 6 | 9 | 15 | 2 | 4 | 34 | 0.0 | 0.0 | 3.0 | 4.5 | 7.5 | 1.0 | 2.0 | 17.0 | 0 |
| 2026 | Richmond | 32 | 5 | 0 | 0 | 18 | 18 | 36 | 7 | 9 | 72 | 0.0 | 0.0 | 3.6 | 3.6 | 7.2 | 1.4 | 1.8 | 14.4 | 0 |
| Career | | | 30 | 15 | 7 | 121 | 81 | 202 | 68 | 31 | 341 | 0.5 | 0.2 | 4.0 | 2.7 | 6.7 | 2.3 | 1.0 | 11.4 | 0 |
