= Sam Swadling =

Samuel Swadling

Personal information
- Full name: Samuel Swadling
- Born: 16 January 2007 (age 19); Western Australia
- Original team: West Perth (WAFL)
- Draft: No. 37, 2025 national draft
- Debut: Round 15, 2026, Collingwood vs. Port Adelaide, at MCG
- Height: 189 cm (6 ft 2 in)
- Weight: 80 kg (176 lb)
- Position: Midfielder

Club information
- Current club: Collingwood
- Number: 32

Playing career^{1}
Years	Club	Games (Goals)
2026–	Collingwood	9 (6)
- ^{1} Playing statistics correct to the end of the 2026 season.

Career highlights
- Rising Star nominee: 2026; Harry Collier Trophy: 2026

Samuel Swadling (born 16 January 2007) is an Australian rules footballer playing for the Collingwood Football Club in the Australian Football League (AFL).

== State football ==
Swadling played for West Perth in the West Australian Football League (WAFL). He played for the junior "Colts" team, averaging 35 disposals per game, and won the fairest and best award after only seven games. Additionally, he was selected for the senior team, playing four times, averaging 17.5 disposals per game, and represented Western Australia four times at the 2025 AFL National Championships.

== AFL career ==
Swadling was drafted by Collingwood with their second pick of the 2025 national draft, which was the 37th pick overall. He impressed at VFL level, collecting 240 disposals in nine games, including a 40-disposal match against Sydney.

Swadling made his AFL debut at the MCG against Port Adelaide in round 15 of the 2026 AFL season. Swadling impressed in his first outing, collecting 18 disposals and a goal playing primarily as a winger.

In round 23, Swadling received the nomination for the 2026 AFL Rising Star Award, following his then-career-high 29 disposals against Hawthorn, also polling his first brownlow vote. Swadling also made the game-saving spoil off the line after the siren, ensuring the game finished a tie.

== Personal life ==
Swadling has a younger brother, Joel, who lives with cerebral palsy and has represented Western Australia nationally in wheelchair basketball tournaments, and is a source of motivation for his older brother.

== Statistics ==
Updated to the end of the 2026 season.

Legend
G	Goals	K	Kicks	D	Disposals	T	Tackles
B	Behinds	H	Handballs	M	Marks

Season	Team	No.	Games	Totals							Averages (per game)							Votes
Season	Team	No.	Games	G	B	K	H	D	M	T	G	B	K	H	D	M	T	Votes
2026	Collingwood	32	9	6	1	93	87	180	36	10	0.7	0.1	10.3	9.7	20.0	4.0	1.1	1
Career			9	6	1	93	87	180	36	10	0.7	0.1	10.3	9.7	20.0	4.0	1.1	1
