= Angus Anderson =

Australian rules footballer (born 2003)

Personal information
- Full name: Angus Anderson
- Nickname: Angry
- Born: 25 May 2003 (age 23); Sydney, New South Wales
- Original teams: Sawtell–Toormina Football Club (AFL North Coast); Sydney Swans Academy (Talent League); Sturt (SANFL)
- Draft: No. 57, 2025 national draft
- Debut: Round 5, 2026, Collingwood vs. Fremantle, at Adelaide Oval
- Height: 190 cm (6 ft 3 in)
- Position: Midfielder / forward

Club information
- Current club: Collingwood
- Number: 41

Playing career^{1}
Years	Club	Games (Goals)
2026–	Collingwood	17 (20)
- ^{1} Playing statistics correct to the end of the 2026 season.

Career highlights
- SANFL premiership: 2025; Jack Oatey Medal: 2025

Angus Anderson (born 25 May 2003) is a professional Australian rules footballer playing for the Collingwood Football Club in the Australian Football League (AFL).

In his junior career, Anderson played for the Sawtell–Toormina Football Club in the AFL North Coast competition, and played for the Sydney Swans Academy in the Talent League, subsequently signing with their reserves team ahead of the 2022 VFL season, and with Sydney as a COVID-19 top-up player for the AFL season. In 2023, Anderson moved to South Australia, signing with Sturt in the South Australian National Football League (SANFL), playing there until the conclusion of the 2025 season, where he became a premiership player in that year's Grand Final and won the Jack Oatey Medal as the player deemed "best on ground".

A versatile midfielder, Anderson was drafted as a mature-age prospect by Collingwood with pick 57 of the 2025 national draft. Following two games at VFL level, he made his senior debut during Gather Round, Round 5 of the 2026 AFL season, against Fremantle at Adelaide Oval.

== State career ==
Anderson began playing football with the Sawtell–Toormina Football Club in the AFL North Coast competition. He played in the Talent League for the Sydney Swans Academy, averaging 23.5 disposals and 7.5 tackles in 2022. In 2022, Anderson played for the Allies in the Under 18 Championships.

In 2023, Anderson moved to South Australia, and signed with Sturt in the SANFL. In 2025, Anderson was named in the SANFL Team of the Year and won the Jack Oatey Medal as the best player on the ground in the 2025 SANFL Grand Final.

== AFL career ==
In 2022, Anderson was selected by Sydney as a COVID-19 top-up player. He played for Sydney in a pre-season practice match against Greater Western Sydney.

Anderson was drafted by Collingwood as a mature-age recruit with pick 57 of the 2025 national draft. He made his debut for Collingwood at Adelaide Oval in Round 5 (Gather Round) of the 2026 AFL season, kicking one goal and accruing 16 disposals in a loss to Fremantle.

== Statistics ==
Updated to the end of the 2026 season.

Legend
G	Goals	K	Kicks	D	Disposals	T	Tackles
B	Behinds	H	Handballs	M	Marks

Season	Team	No.	Games	Totals							Averages (per game)							Votes
Season	Team	No.	Games	G	B	K	H	D	M	T	G	B	K	H	D	M	T	Votes
2026	Collingwood	41	17	20	14	116	81	197	42	56	1.2	0.8	6.8	4.8	11.6	2.5	3.3	0
Career			17	20	14	116	81	197	42	56	1.2	0.8	6.8	4.8	11.6	2.5	3.3	0
