= Mitch Podhajski =

Australian rules footballer (born 1999)

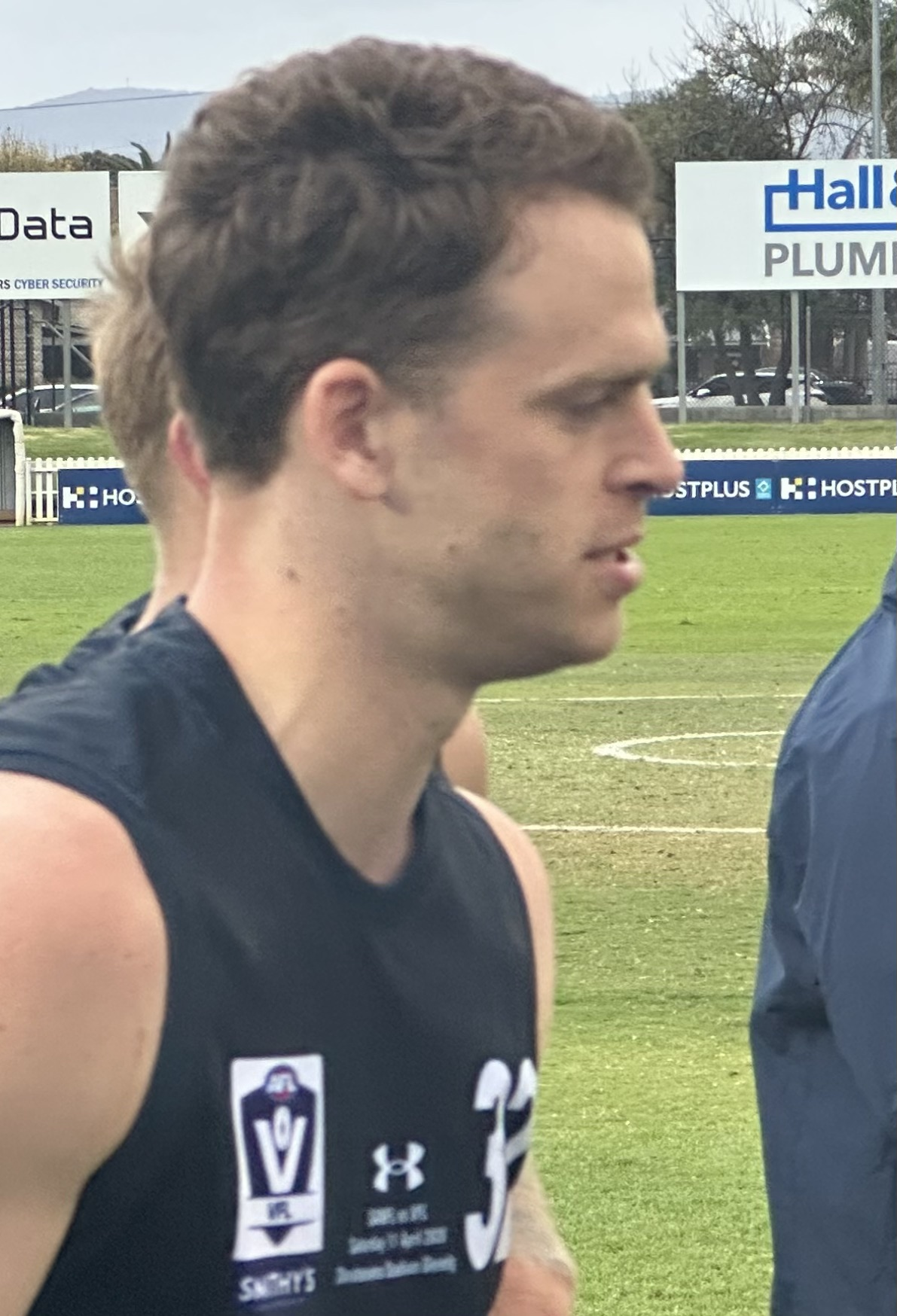
- Podhajski representing the Victorian Football League (VFL) in April 2026

Personal information
- Full name: Mitchell Podhajski
- Nickname: Pods
- Born: 4 January 1999 (age 27); Australia
- Original teams: Greenvale (EDFL); Calder Cannons (Talent League); Coburg (VFL)
- Draft: No. 18, 2026 mid-season rookie draft
- Debut: Round 13, 2026, Collingwood vs. Melbourne, at the MCG
- Height: 192 cm (6 ft 4 in)
- Position: Key forward
- Other occupation: Podiatrist

Playing career^{1}
Years	Club	Games (Goals)
2026	Collingwood	2 (1)
- ^{1} Playing statistics correct to the end of the 2026 season.

Mitchell Podhajski (born 4 January 1999) is a former professional Australian rules footballer who played for the Collingwood Football Club in the Australian Football League (AFL).

Podhajski grew up playing for the Greenvale Football Club in the Essendon District Football League (EDFL), before representing the Calder Cannons in the Talent League in his draft year. After going undrafted in the 2017 national draft, he joined Coburg in the Victorian Football League (VFL), playing 103 games there across nine seasons.

He was recruited as a mature-age rookie by the Collingwood Football Club with pick 18 (the club's third selection) in the 2026 mid-season rookie draft, replacing Jamie Elliott after he was placed on the inactive list following a season-ending anterior cruciate ligament (ACL) injury. A key forward, Podhajski made his debut in round 13 of the 2026 AFL season, in the King's Birthday match against Melbourne at the Melbourne Cricket Ground (MCG), kicking one goal.

== Early life ==
Mitchell Podhajski was born on 4 January 1999 in Wallan, Victoria. He was educated at St. Bernard's College, in Essendon, Victoria.

== Career ==
=== Junior career ===
Podhajski played junior football for the Greenvale Football Club in the Essendon District Football League (EDFL). He played Talent League football for the Calder Cannons. In 2017, he also represented Vic Metro in the Under 18 Championships.

=== VFL career ===
After going undrafted in the 2017 national draft, Podhajski joined the Coburg Football Club in the VFL. There, he played as an intercept defender and occasional inside midfielder.

Towards the end of the 2023 VFL season, Coburg coach Jamie Cassidy-McNamara switched Podhajski to the forward line. Though his following year was interrupted by injury, with Podhajski ending the 2024 season with 13 goals from six games, his move forward proved successful in 2025. In the 2025 VFL season, Podhajski kicked 54 goals from 18 games to poll second in the Jim 'Frosty' Miller Medal, and be named in the 2025 VFL Team of the Year. Following his move to the forward line, Podhajski kicked 111 goals from 38 games for Coburg. He played a total of 103 games for Coburg across 9 seasons.

=== AFL career ===
Podhajski was drafted by the Collingwood Football Club with pick 18 of the 2026 mid-season rookie draft. He was selected to make his debut in round 13 of the 2026 AFL season, in the King's Birthday match at the Melbourne Cricket Ground (MCG) against Melbourne. Podhajski was delisted at the end of the 2026 season, having played two games at AFL level.

== Personal life ==
Podhajski graduated from La Trobe University with a Bachelor of Applied Science and a Masters degree in Podiatric Practice. In 2025, he completed a master of sports medicine at the University of Melbourne.

== Statistics ==
Updated to the end of the 2026 season.

Legend
G	Goals	K	Kicks	D	Disposals	T	Tackles
B	Behinds	H	Handballs	M	Marks

Season	Team	No.	Games	Totals							Averages (per game)							Votes
Season	Team	No.	Games	G	B	K	H	D	M	T	G	B	K	H	D	M	T	Votes
2026	Collingwood	46	2	1	3	14	7	21	5	4	0.5	1.5	7.0	3.5	10.5	2.5	2.0	0
Career			2	1	3	14	7	21	5	4	0.5	1.5	7.0	3.5	10.5	2.5	2.0	0
