= Lachie Sullivan =

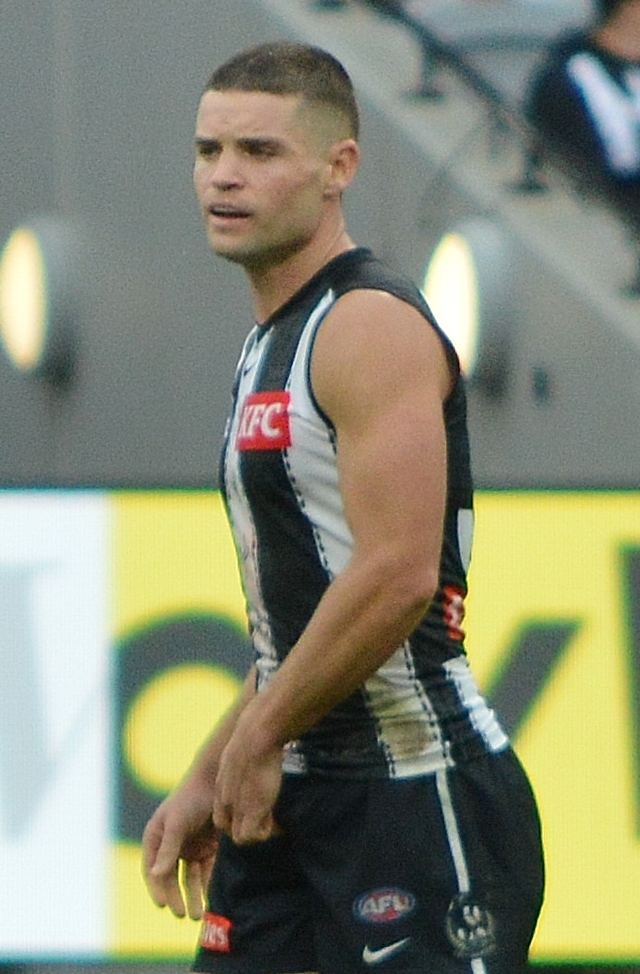
- Sullivan in May 2025

Personal information
- Full name: Lachlan John Sullivan
- Nickname: Sully
- Born: 25 September 1997 (age 29)
- Original team: Footscray (VFL)/St Kevin’s Old Boys (VAFA)
- Debut: 3 May 2024, Collingwood vs. Carlton, at MCG
- Height: 180 cm (5 ft 11 in)
- Weight: 81 kg (179 lb)

Playing career^{1}
Years	Club	Games (Goals)
2024–2026	Collingwood	26 (10)
- ^{1} Playing statistics correct to the end of the 2026 season.

Lachlan John Sullivan (born 25 September 1997) is an Australian rules footballer who played for the Collingwood Football Club in the Australian Football League (AFL).

== State football ==
Sullivan began his career playing junior football for East Malvern Knights in the South Metro Junior Football League. He played school football at St Kevin's College from 2010-2015, playing for the school's First XVIII side from Year 10 through to Year 12. In 2016, Sullivan joined St Kevin's Old Boys in the Victorian Amateur Football Association (VAFA). Transitioning to the Victorian Football League (VFL) in 2019, he signed with Footscray. Sullivan's consistent performance led to him being named team captain, and winning Footscray's Best and Fairest awards in both 2022 and 2023, as well as being awarded the 2023 Coaches MVP Award, attributed to his average of 30.9 disposals and 7.9 clearances per game. Sullivan's strong VFL performance in 2023 culminated in finishing third in voting for the J. J. Liston Trophy, and being selected as captain in the 2023 VFL Team of the Year.

== AFL career ==
Despite reportedly garnering interest from AFL clubs Essendon and the Western Bulldogs, Sullivan went undrafted, and worked as an electrician while continuing to vie for selection from a professional club. He was invited to train with Collingwood in the pre-season before the 2024 AFL season and was then signed up during the pre-season supplementary selection period as a mature-age recruit. He made his debut in May 2024 against Carlton, coming on as the substitute in the second quarter and kicking a goal with his first kick.

Sullivan played 26 games across three seasons and was delisted after the 2026 AFL season.

== Statistics ==
Updated to the end of the 2026 season.

Legend
G	Goals	K	Kicks	D	Disposals	T	Tackles
B	Behinds	H	Handballs	M	Marks

Season	Team	No.	Games	Totals							Averages (per game)							Votes
Season	Team	No.	Games	G	B	K	H	D	M	T	G	B	K	H	D	M	T	Votes
2024	Collingwood	33	10	2	5	49	80	129	16	25	0.2	0.5	4.9	8.0	12.9	1.6	2.5	0
2025	Collingwood	33	14	6	2	69	81	150	22	40	0.4	0.1	4.9	5.8	10.7	1.6	2.9	0
2026	Collingwood	33	2	2	1	9	15	24	2	4	1.0	0.5	4.5	7.5	12.0	1.0	2.0	0
Career			26	10	8	127	176	303	40	69	0.4	0.3	4.9	6.8	11.7	1.5	2.7	0
