= Jack Buller =

Personal information
- Full name: Jack Archibald Buller
- Born: 16 May 2001 (age 25)
- Original team: Cottesloe/Scotch College/Claremont
- Draft: No. 15, 2023 mid-season rookie draft
- Debut: Round 14, 2023, Sydney vs. Brisbane Lions, at the Gabba
- Height: 199 cm (6 ft 6 in)
- Position: Forward

Club information
- Current club: Collingwood
- Number: 34

Playing career^{1}
Years	Club	Games (Goals)
2023–2025	Sydney	10 (11)
2026–	Collingwood	10 (7)
Total		20 (18)
- ^{1} Playing statistics correct to the end of the 2026 season.

Jack Archibald Buller (born 16 May 2001) is a professional Australian rules footballer who plays for the Collingwood Football Club in the Australian Football League (AFL). Buller previously played for the Sydney Swans.

== Junior and WAFL career ==
Buller was part of Western Australia's 2019 under-18 championship team, predominantly playing as a key defender and ruckman.

After going undrafted, Buller played for Claremont in the WAFL. Following good form in 2023, Buller appeared likely to be drafted to the AFL during the 2023 mid-season rookie draft.

== AFL career ==
Buller was selected with pick 15 of the 2023 mid-season rookie draft by the Sydney Swans. He made his debut in round 14 of the 2023 AFL season.

At the end of the 2025 AFL season, Buller requested a trade to the Collingwood Football Club. He was traded to Collingwood along with a 2026 fourth-round draft pick in exchange for a 2026 third-round pick.

== Statistics ==
Updated to the end of the 2026 season.

Legend
G	Goals	K	Kicks	D	Disposals	T	Tackles
B	Behinds	H	Handballs	M	Marks

Season	Team	No.	Games	Totals							Averages (per game)							Votes
Season	Team	No.	Games	G	B	K	H	D	M	T	G	B	K	H	D	M	T	Votes
2023	Sydney	47	1	0	0	1	1	2	2	2	0.0	0.0	1.0	1.0	2.0	2.0	2.0	0
2024	Sydney	39	0	—	—	—	—	—	—	—	—	—	—	—	—	—	—	0
2025	Sydney	39	9	11	5	39	43	82	35	16	1.2	0.6	4.3	4.8	9.1	3.9	1.8	0
2026	Collingwood	34	10	7	8	41	39	80	36	14	0.7	0.8	4.1	3.9	8.0	3.6	1.4	0
Career			20	18	13	81	83	164	73	32	0.9	0.7	4.1	4.2	8.2	3.7	1.6	0
