= Liam Puncher =

Personal information
- Born: 26 August 2003 (age 23)
- Original teams: St Ives (AFL Sydney); North Shore (AFL Sydney); Sydney Swans Academy (Talent League); Sturt (SANFL); Woodville-West Torrens (SANFL)
- Draft: No. 15, 2026 mid-season rookie draft
- Debut: Round 17, 2026, Collingwood vs. Gold Coast, at Carrara Stadium
- Height: 196 cm (6 ft 5 in)
- Position: Key Defender

Club information
- Current club: Collingwood
- Number: 47

Playing career^{1}
| Years | Club | Games (Goals) |
| 2026– | Collingwood | 8 (0) |
- ^{1} Playing statistics correct to the end of round 24, 2026.

Liam Puncher (born 26 August 2003) is a professional Australian rules footballer who plays for the Collingwood Football Club in the Australian Football League (AFL).

== Pre-AFL career ==
Puncher played in the AFL Sydney league for St Ives and North Shore. In 2016, Puncher joined the Sydney Swans Academy at U13s level. Representing the Swans in the Talent League, Puncher averaged 10.7 disposals and 2.3 marks in 2021, and 9.3 disposals and 4 marks per game in 2022.

In 2023, Puncher joined Sturt in the SANFL. Ahead of the 2025 SANFL season, Puncher made the move from Sturt to Woodville-West Torrens.

== AFL career ==
Puncher was selected by Collingwood with pick 15 of the 2026 mid-season rookie draft. He was selected to make his debut in round 17 of the 2026 AFL season.

== Statistics ==
Updated to the end of round 22, 2026.

Legend
| G | Goals | K | Kicks | D | Disposals | T | Tackles |
| B | Behinds | H | Handballs | M | Marks |

| Season | Team | No. | Games | Totals | | | | | | | Averages (per game) | | | | | | | Votes |
| Season | Team | No. | Games | G | B | K | H | D | M | T | G | B | K | H | D | M | T | Votes |
|---|---|---|---|---|---|---|---|---|---|---|---|---|---|---|---|---|---|---|
| 2026 | Collingwood | 47 | 6 | 0 | 0 | 23 | 17 | 40 | 19 | 8 | 0.0 | 0.0 | 3.8 | 2.8 | 6.7 | 3.2 | 1.3 | 0 |
| Career | | | 6 | 0 | 0 | 23 | 17 | 40 | 19 | 8 | 0.0 | 0.0 | 3.8 | 2.8 | 6.7 | 3.2 | 1.3 | 0 |
