= 2025 VFL season =

143rd season of the Victorian Football League

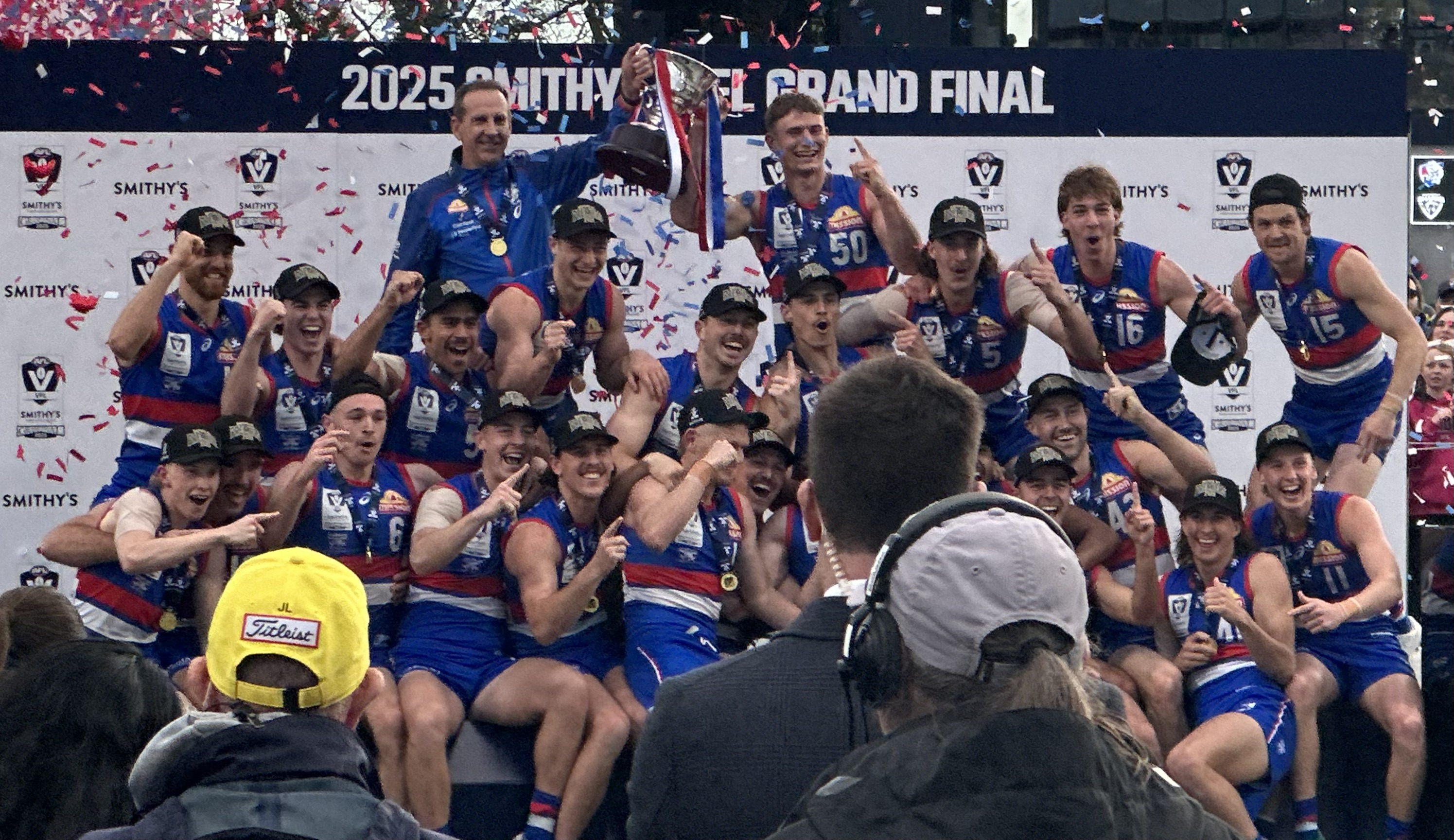
- Footscray celebrates with the premiership cup
- Date: 21 March – 21 September 2025
- Teams: 21
- Premiers: Footscray reserves 3rd premiership
- Runners-up: Southport; 3rd runners-up result
- Minor premiers: Footscray reserves 2nd minor premiership
- J. J. Liston Trophy: Jacob Dawson (Southport – 28 votes)
- Frosty Miller Medallist: Brodie McLaughlin (Williamstown – 67 goals)

Attendance
- Matches played: 200
- Highest (H&A): 5,561 (Round 18, Frankston v Collingwood)
- Highest (finals): 8,818 (Grand Final, Footscray v Southport)

The 2025 VFL season was the 143rd season of the Victorian Football League (VFL), a second-tier Australian rules football competition played in the states of Victoria, New South Wales, and Queensland. The season began on 21 March and concluded on 21 September.

Footscray reserves won the premiership for the third time, defeating Southport by ten points in the 2025 VFL Grand Final.

== Background ==
=== Death of Dale Tapping ===
On 4 February 2025, Essendon coach Dale Tapping died, two years after he was diagnosed with myeloma, an aggressive form of blood cancer. Essendon had appointed Tapping as its VFL coach for the 2025 season only several months prior on 11 October 2024. He had previously served as Collingwood's VFL coach from 2013 until the end of the 2016 season, and was named VFL Coach of the Year in 2016.

Cameron Joyce, who coached Gold Coast in the AFL Women's (AFLW) from 2022 season 6 until he was dismissed at the end of the 2024 season, was announced as Essendon's new VFL coach on 24 February 2025.

=== Practice matches ===
Clubs held practice matches beginning on 15 February 2025. A carnival featuring the six Victorian-based standaline clubs was held at Mars Stadium in Ballarat on 1 March 2025.

There was speculation that the Tasmania Football Club would enter the VFL in 2025. Instead, AFL Tasmania introduced a Senior Talent Academy, which included representative games against Frankston and Sandringham on 22 March 2025 and 4 May 2025 respectively. On 5 September 2025, Tasmania was granted a licence to compete in the VFL, starting in 2026.

=== Broadcast rights ===
In September 2022, the Australian Football League (AFL) announced a seven-year, $4.5 billion broadcast rights deal with the Seven Network, Foxtel and Telstra, effective from the 2025 season. This included Saturday matches (outside of marquee matches) becoming exclusive to Foxtel and Kayo for the first eight rounds of the season, while all Saturday night matches in the last eight rounds of the season would be exclusive to Seven.

As a result, Seven moved its VFL coverage from Sunday afternoon to 7pm on Saturdays, airing in Victoria on 7mate. On 17 March 2025, the VFL announced that one game per round would be broadcast on Saturday nights, with fixture changes implemented accordingly.

== Clubs ==
=== Venues and affiliations ===
Club	State	Home venue(s)	Capacity	AFL affiliation
Box Hill	VIC	Box Hill City Oval	10,000	Hawthorn
Box Hill	VIC	Wonthaggi Recreation Reserve	5,000	Hawthorn
Brisbane	QLD	Brighton Homes Arena	8,000	Brisbane
Carlton	VIC	Ikon Park	13,000	Carlton
Casey	VIC	Casey Fields	9,000	Melbourne
Coburg	VIC	Barry Plant Park	15,000	—N/a
Collingwood	VIC	AIA Vitality Centre	3,500	Collingwood
Collingwood	VIC	Victoria Park	10,000	Collingwood
Essendon	VIC	NEC Hangar	3,500	Essendon
Essendon	VIC	Windy Hill	10,000	Essendon
Footscray	VIC	Mission Whitten Oval	10,000	Western Bulldogs
Footscray	VIC	Marvel Stadium	53,343	Western Bulldogs
Frankston	VIC	Kinetic Stadium	5,000	—N/a
Geelong	VIC	GMHBA Stadium	40,000	Geelong
Gold Coast	QLD	People First Stadium	25,000	Gold Coast
Greater Western Sydney	NSW	Blacktown ISP Oval	10,000	Greater Western Sydney
Greater Western Sydney	NSW	ENGIE Stadium	23,500	Greater Western Sydney
Greater Western Sydney	NSW	Albury Sports Ground	8,000	Greater Western Sydney
North Melbourne	VIC	Arden Street Oval	4,000	North Melbourne
Northern Bullants	VIC	Genis Steel Oval	5,000	—N/a
Port Melbourne	VIC	ETU Stadium	6,000	—N/a
Richmond	VIC	Holm Park	7,000	Richmond
Richmond	VIC	Swinburne Centre	2,800	Richmond
Sandringham	VIC	RSEA Park	8,000	St Kilda
Sandringham	VIC	WS Trevor Barker Beach Oval	6,000	St Kilda
Southport	QLD	Fankhauser Reserve	8,000	—N/a
Sydney	NSW	Tramway Oval	1,000	Sydney
Sydney	NSW	Blacktown ISP Oval	10,000	Sydney
Sydney	NSW	Sydney Cricket Ground	48,000	Sydney
Werribee	VIC	Avalon Airport Oval	8,000	—N/a
Williamstown	VIC	DSV Stadium	6,000	—N/a

=== Coach appointments ===
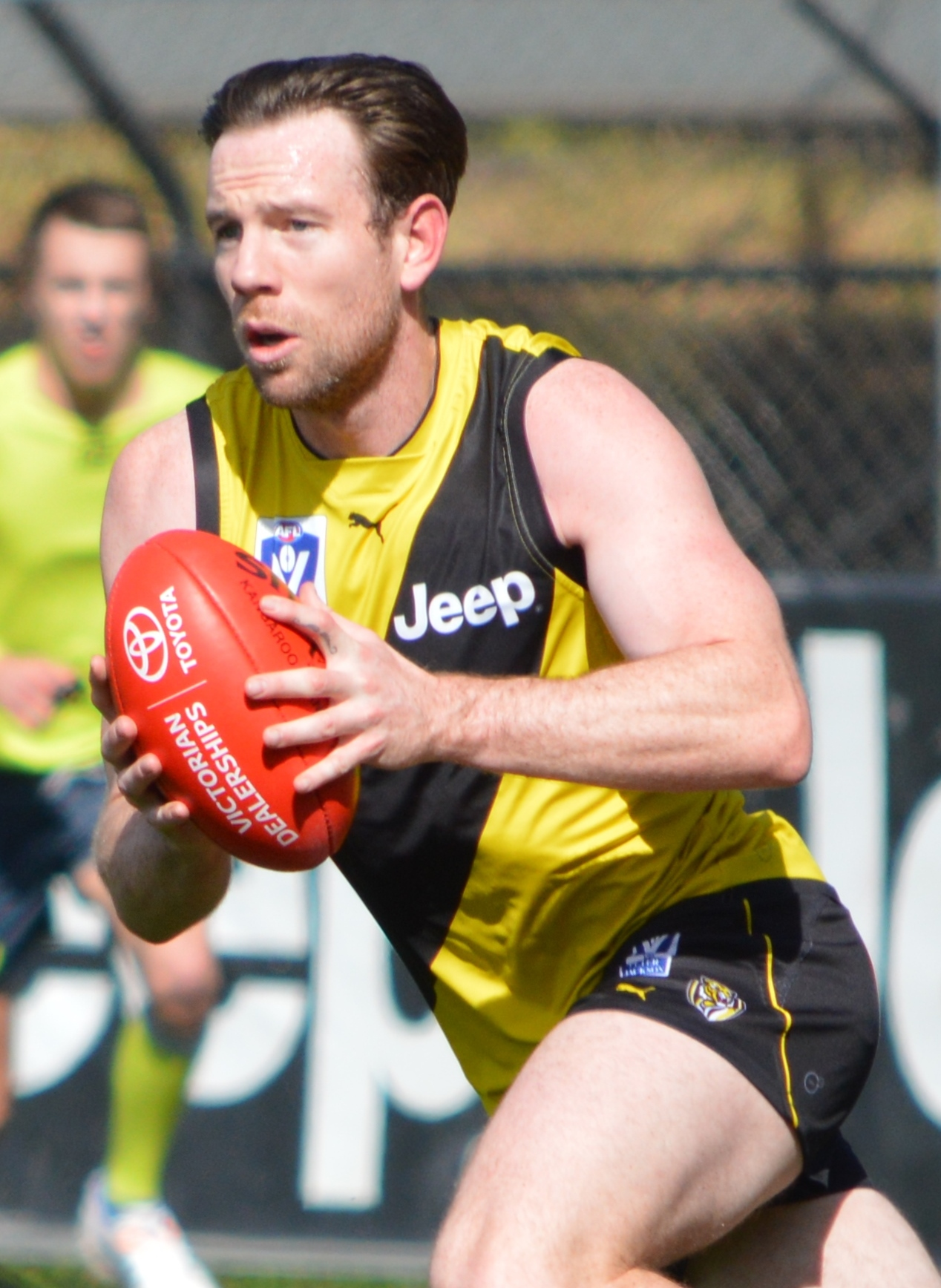
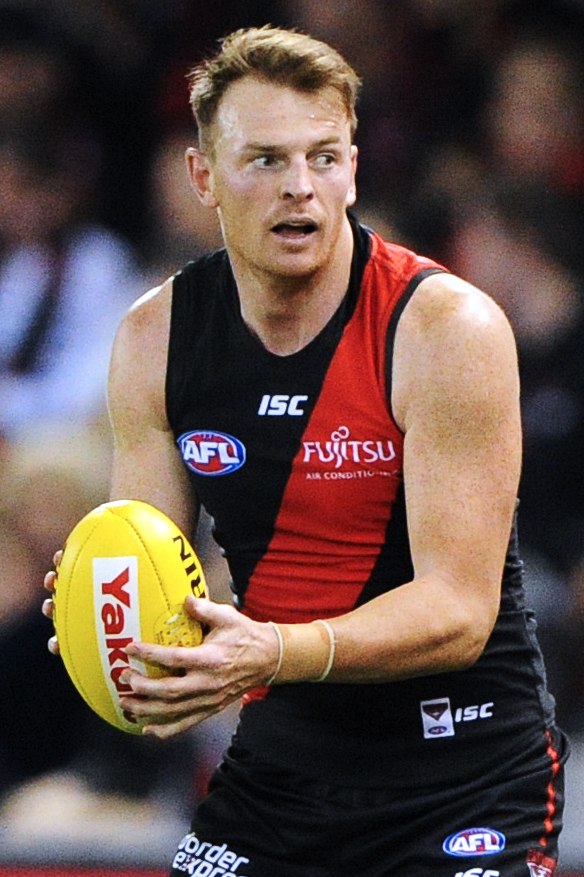
Jake Batchelor (left) and Brendon Goddard (right)

New coach	Club	Date of appointment	Previous coach	Ref
Matthew Primus	Southport	7 August 2024	Steve Daniel	
Andy Otten	Collingwood	19 August 2024	Josh Fraser	
Brendan McCartney	Port Melbourne	19 August 2024	Adam Skrobalak	
Jake Batchelor	Richmond	23 September 2024	Steven Morris	
Dale Tapping	Essendon	11 October 2024	Blake Caracella	
Brendon Goddard	Sandringham	11 October 2024	Jake Batchelor	
Jarrad McVeigh	Sydney	21 October 2024	Damian Truslove	
Cameron Joyce	Essendon	24 February 2025	Dale Tapping	

=== Club leadership ===
Club	Coach	Leadership group			Ref
Club	Coach	Captain(s)	Vice-captain(s)	Other leader(s)	Ref
Box Hill	Zane Littlejohn	Callum Porter	Stu Horner	Seb Amoroso, Jake Arundell, Trent Bianco, Kye Declase, Corey Preston	
Brisbane	Ben Hudson				
Carlton	Luke Power	Heath Ramshaw			
Carlton	Luke Power	Liam McMahon (R1–R9) (Note: Liam McMahon was drafted to Essendon in the AFL mid-season draft held on 28 May following round 9 of the VFL season.)			
Casey	Taylor Whitford	Deakyn Smith	Riley Baldi, Paddy Cross	Charlie Peters, Tom Freeman, Max Gregory, Kai Windsor	
Coburg	Jamie Cassidy-McNamara	Jesse Corigliano	Flynn Gentile, Lachlan Walker, Mitch Podhajski	Ryan Sturgess, Braedyn Gillard, Daniel Johnson, Joel Trudgeon, Jack Bytel	
Collingwood	Andy Otten	Sam Glover		Brady Grey, Harrison Kennedy, Chad Mulvogue, Angus Seivers, Curtis Taylor, Tom Wilson	
Essendon	Cameron Joyce	Xavier O'Neill	Jackson Hately		
Footscray	Stewart Edge	Dan Orgill	Cooper Craig-Peters	David Cuningham, Josh Kellett, Jarrod Gilbee	
Frankston	Jackson Kornberg	Trent Mynott			
Geelong	Mark Corrigan	Dan Capiron	Marcus Herbert		
Gold Coast	Tate Kaeslar	James Tsitas			
Greater Western Sydney	Wayne Cripps	Ryan Hebron			
North Melbourne	Tom Lynch	Darcy Macpherson	Louis Butler, Connor Downie		
Northern Bullants	Rohan Welsh	Liam Mackie	Patrick Fairlie, Jean-Luc Velissaris	Josh Hamilton	
Northern Bullants	Rocky Iannello (R1) (Note: Rocky Iannello was appointed as the acting head coach for round 1 because Rohan Welsh had been hospitalised with a severe foot infection.)	Liam Mackie	Patrick Fairlie, Jean-Luc Velissaris	Jackson Weidemann (Note: Jackson Weidemann left the Northern Bullants and returned to North Albury in the Ovens & Murray Football Netball League (OMFNL) following round 7 of the VFL season.)	
Port Melbourne	Brendan McCartney	Harvey Hooper		Tom Hird, Matt Signorello, Jimmy Miller, Fraser Rosman, Tom Highmore	
Richmond	Jake Batchelor	Lachlan Street	Mutaz El Nour, Joel Garner	Liam George, Nick 'Bob' Girolami	
Sandringham	Brendon Goddard	Blake Watson	Misilifi Faimalo	Andrew Mathieson, Liam Purcell, Mitch Ryan, Ethan Williams	
Southport	Matthew Primus	Brayden Crossley, Jacob Dawson	Zac Foot		
Sydney	Jarrad McVeigh	Nick Shipley			
Werribee	James Allan	Jesse Clark	Dom Brew (vc), Louis Pinnuck (dvc)	Angus Hicks, Jay Dahlhaus	
Williamstown	Justin Plapp	Finn O'Dwyer, Cameron Polson	Jack Toner	Toby Triffett, Brodie McLaughlin	

== Home-and-away season ==
=== Round 1 ===
	Round 1
Friday, 21 March (7:05pm)	Carlton 12.4 (76)	def. by	Box Hill 11.14 (80)	Ikon Park	Report
Saturday, 22 March (12:05pm)	Brisbane 16.10 (106)	def.	Port Melbourne 11.15 (81)	Brighton Homes Arena	Report
Saturday, 22 March (12:05pm)	Collingwood 13.6 (84)	def.	Sydney 8.11 (59)	Victoria Park	Report
Saturday, 22 March (1:05pm)	Southport 13.11 (89)	def.	Werribee 10.11 (71)	Fankhauser Reserve	Report
Saturday, 22 March (3:05pm)	Essendon 14.10 (94)	def.	Williamstown 12.11 (83)	NEC Hangar	Report
Saturday, 22 March (7:10pm)	Footscray 22.16 (148)	def.	Northern Bullants 3.4 (22)	Mission Whitten Oval	Report
Sunday, 23 March (11:05am)	Casey 10.16 (76)	drew with	North Melbourne 11.10 (76)	Casey Fields	Report
Sunday, 23 March (11:05am)	Richmond 13.10 (88)	def.	Coburg 11.9 (75)	Holm Park	Report
Sunday, 23 March (2:05pm)	Sandringham 8.12 (60)	def. by	Geelong 12.19 (91)	Trevor Barker Beach Oval	Report
	Bye; Frankston, Gold Coast, Greater Western Sydney

=== Round 2 ===
	Round 2
Saturday, 29 March (10:05am)	Casey 13.12 (90)	def.	Gold Coast 13.10 (88)	Casey Fields	Report
Saturday, 29 March (11:05am)	Greater Western Sydney 14.9 (93)	def.	Williamstown 8.16 (64)	Blacktown ISP Oval	Report
Saturday, 29 March (11:05am)	Essendon 7.13 (55)	def. by	Werribee 11.12 (78)	NEC Hangar	Report
Saturday, 29 March (12:05pm)	Sandringham 11.8 (74)	def. by	Richmond 11.14 (80)	RSEA Park	Report
Saturday, 29 March (12:05pm)	Southport 9.8 (62)	def.	Coburg 8.11 (59)	Fankhauser Reserve	Report
Saturday, 29 March (12:35pm)	Geelong 13.12 (90)	def.	Northern Bullants 9.6 (60)	GMHBA Stadium	Report
Saturday, 29 March (2:05pm)	Box Hill 14.8 (92)	def.	North Melbourne 12.11 (83)	Box Hill City Oval (crowd: 1,111)	Report
Saturday, 29 March (7:10pm)	Port Melbourne 4.10 (34)	def. by	Frankston 5.20 (50)	ETU Stadium	Report
	Bye; Brisbane, Carlton, Collingwood, Footscray, Sydney
Richmond's Joel Garner kicked a goal after the final siren to defeat Sandringham.; The Geelong vs Northern Bullants match was moved from Friday, 28 March (7:35pm) to Saturday, 29 March (12:35pm).

=== Round 3 ===
	Round 3
Friday, 4 April (3:50pm)	Geelong 16.13 (109)	def.	Casey 14.9 (93)	GMHBA Stadium	Report
Friday, 4 April (7:35pm)	Williamstown 10.11 (71)	def.	Frankston 8.12 (60)	DSV Stadium	Report
Saturday, 5 April (11:05am)	Richmond 12.13 (85)	def.	Brisbane 8.15 (63)	Swinburne Centre	Report
Saturday, 5 April (1:05pm)	Werribee 11.8 (74)	def. by	Footscray 11.12 (78)	Avalon Airport Oval	Report
Saturday, 5 April (4:40pm)	Gold Coast 25.14 (164)	def.	Northern Bullants 5.9 (39)	People First Stadium	Report
Saturday, 5 April (7:10pm)	Carlton 8.13 (61)	def. by	Southport 18.9 (117)	Ikon Park	Report
Sunday, 6 April (9:35am)	Greater Western Sydney 22.19 (151)	def.	Sandringham 6.7 (43)	Blacktown ISP Oval	Report
Sunday, 6 April (12:05pm)	North Melbourne 17.8 (110)	def.	Sydney 9.7 (61)	Arden Street Oval	Report
Sunday, 6 April (1:05pm)	Coburg 15.13 (103)	def. by	Collingwood 20.7 (127)	Barry Plant Park (crowd: 3,500)	Report
	Bye; Box Hill, Port Melbourne, Essendon

=== Round 4 ===
	Round 4
Friday, 18 April (12:05pm)	North Melbourne 12.12 (84)	def.	Carlton 12.10 (82)	Arden Street Oval	Report
Friday, 18 April (12:05pm)	Brisbane 16.11 (107)	def.	Collingwood 16.10 (106)	Brighton Homes Arena	Report
Friday, 18 April (1:05pm)	Williamstown 11.2 (68)	def. by	Coburg 18.11 (119)	DSV Stadium	Report
Friday, 18 April (7:35pm)	Frankston 15.8 (98)	def.	Richmond 11.7 (73)	Kinetic Stadium (crowd: 4,217)	Report
Saturday, 19 April (11:05am)	Casey 9.13 (67)	def. by	Greater Western Sydney 19.6 (120)	Casey Fields	Report
Saturday, 19 April (12:05pm)	Sydney 11.9 (75)	def.	Werribee 11.7 (73)	Blacktown ISP Oval	Report
Saturday, 19 April (12:05pm)	Southport 16.15 (111)	def.	Gold Coast 8.8 (56)	Fankhauser Reserve	Report
Saturday, 19 April (7:10pm)	Port Melbourne 7.13 (55)	def. by	Essendon 9.17 (71)	ETU Stadium (crowd: 2,000)	Report
Sunday, 20 April (2:05pm)	Geelong 11.7 (73)	def. by	Box Hill 18.11 (113)	GMHBA Stadium	Report
Sunday, 20 April (2:05pm)	Footscray 10.11 (71)	def. by	Sandringham 13.11 (89)	Mission Whitten Oval	Report
	Bye; Northern Bullants
Brisbane forward Fergus McFadyen kicked a behind after the final siren to defeat Collingwood.; Coburg defeated Williamstown for the first time since round 15 of the 2008 season.; The Geelong vs Box Hill match was moved from 11.35am to 2:05pm.

=== Round 5 ===
	Round 5
Thursday, 24 April (11:05am)	Richmond 3.7 (25)	def. by	Casey 21.17 (143)	Casey Fields	Report
Thursday, 24 April (7:35pm)	Frankston 14.15 (99)	def.	Northern Bullants 8.7 (55)	Kinetic Stadium (crowd: 1,807)	Report
Friday, 25 April (1:05pm)	Werribee 12.7 (79)	def.	Williamstown 8.11 (59)	Avalon Airport Oval	Report
Saturday, 26 April (11:05am)	Sandringham 5.14 (44)	def. by	Brisbane 13.15 (93)	RSEA Park	Report
Saturday, 26 April (7:10pm)	Essendon 12.16 (88)	def. by	Collingwood 18.11 (119)	ETU Stadium	Report
Sunday, 27 April (9:25am)	Gold Coast 14.9 (93)	def.	Sydney 6.10 (46)	People First Stadium	Report
Sunday, 27 April (11:05am)	Box Hill 19.9 (123)	def.	Port Melbourne 12.13 (85)	Wonthaggi Recreation Reserve	Report
Sunday, 27 April (11:05am)	Carlton 13.10 (88)	def.	Geelong 12.12 (84)	Ikon Park	Report
Sunday, 27 April (12:05pm)	Greater Western Sydney 17.18 (120)	def.	Footscray 6.11 (47)	Blacktown ISP Oval	Report
	Bye; Coburg, Southport, North Melbourne
Richmond's 118-point loss to Casey was its biggest loss as a reserves team in the VFL, surpassing its previous record 117-point loss to Footscray in 2014.

=== Round 6 ===
	Round 6
Friday, 2 May (2:05pm)	Essendon 10.13 (73)	def. by	North Melbourne 12.11 (83)	Windy Hill	Report
Saturday, 3 May (12:05pm)	Williamstown 16.12 (108)	def.	Southport 15.15 (105)	DSV Stadium	Report
Saturday, 3 May (1:05pm)	Werribee 19.15 (129)	def.	Frankston 14.6 (90)	Avalon Airport Oval	Report
Saturday, 3 May (2:05pm)	Collingwood 6.6 (42)	def. by	Footscray 16.18 (114)	Victoria Park	Report
Saturday, 3 May (2:05pm)	Northern Bullants 8.8 (56)	def. by	Port Melbourne 23.17 (155)	Genis Steel Oval	Report
Saturday, 3 May (7:10pm)	Box Hill 9.12 (66)	def. by	Richmond 14.7 (91)	Kinetic Stadium	Report
Sunday, 4 May (12:05pm)	Brisbane 14.11 (95)	def.	Gold Coast 14.9 (93)	Brighton Homes Arena	Report
Sunday, 4 May (1:05pm)	Coburg 15.10 (100)	def.	Carlton 11.12 (78)	Barry Plant Park	Report
Sunday, 4 May (4:35pm)	Sydney 9.11 (65)	def. by	Greater Western Sydney 13.13 (91)	Sydney Cricket Ground	Report
	Bye; Casey, Sandringham, Geelong

=== Round 7 ===
	Round 7
Saturday, 10 May (11:05am)	Essendon 16.11 (107)	def.	Sydney 5.12 (42)	Windy Hill	Report
Saturday, 10 May (11:05am)	Footscray 12.8 (80)	def.	Casey 9.8 (62)	Mission Whitten Oval	Report
Saturday, 10 May (12:05pm)	Werribee 11.11 (77)	def. by	Box Hill 14.9 (93)	Avalon Airport Oval	Report
Saturday, 10 May (12:05pm)	Southport 10.12 (72)	drew with	Port Melbourne 10.12 (72)	Fankhauser Reserve	Report
Saturday, 10 May (12:05pm)	North Melbourne 9.11 (65)	def. by	Brisbane 13.14 (92)	Arden Street Oval	Report
Saturday, 10 May (2:05pm)	Northern Bullants 12.4 (76)	def. by	Collingwood 23.13 (151)	Genis Steel Oval	Report
Saturday, 10 May (7:10pm)	Carlton 9.11 (65)	def.	Sandringham 6.11 (47)	Ikon Park	Report
Saturday, 10 May (7:35pm)	Frankston 12.13 (85)	def.	Coburg 13.6 (84)	Kinetic Stadium (crowd: 1,683)	Report
Sunday, 11 May (11:35qm)	Geelong 11.9 (75)	def. by	Greater Western Sydney 16.11 (107)	GMHBA Stadium	Report
	Bye; Gold Coast, Richmond, Williamstown
Frankston was awarded a holding the ball free kick in the final seconds of the match against Coburg, resulting in Blake O'Leary kicking a goal after the final siren to win.

=== Round 8 ===
	Round 8
Friday, 16 May (3:35pm)	Sydney 11.9 (75)	def. by	Carlton 15.15 (105)	Sydney Cricket Ground	Report
Saturday, 17 May (10:05am)	Collingwood 8.8 (56)	def.	Greater Western Sydney 5.15 (45)	Victoria Park	Report
Saturday, 17 May (11:05am)	Casey 6.17 (53)	def. by	Southport 14.10 (94)	Casey Fields	Report
Saturday, 17 May (11:05am)	Gold Coast 3.11 (29)	def. by	Box Hill 17.11 (113)	People First Stadium	Report
Saturday, 17 May (3:05pm)	Williamstown 12.12 (84)	def.	Footscray 7.14 (56)	DSV Stadium	Report
Saturday, 17 May (7:10pm)	Port Melbourne 6.15 (51)	def.	Geelong 6.11 (47)	ETU Stadium	Report
Sunday, 18 May (1:05pm)	Coburg 15.9 (99)	def.	Northern Bullants 10.9 (69)	Barry Plant Park	Report
Sunday, 18 May (2:05pm)	Sandringham 9.7 (61)	def. by	Werribee 17.10 (112)	Trevor Barker Beach Oval	Report
Sunday, 18 May (2:05pm)	North Melbourne 9.8 (62)	def.	Richmond 8.12 (60)	Arden Street Oval	Report
	Bye; Brisbane, Essendon, Frankston
The Port Melbourne vs Geelong match was moved from 2.05pm to 7:10pm to allow for a television broadcast on 7mate.

=== Round 9 ===
	Round 9
Friday, 23 May (5:05pm)	Footscray 14.10 (94)	def.	Geelong 11.5 (71)	Mission Whitten Oval	Report
Saturday, 24 May (11:05am)	Box Hill 14.7 (91)	def.	Brisbane 10.12 (72)	Box Hill City Oval (crowd: 1,289)	Report
Saturday, 24 May (12:05pm)	Southport 22.10 (142)	def.	Frankston 16.6 (102)	Fankhauser Reserve	Report
Saturday, 24 May (1:05pm)	Coburg 11.23 (89)	def.	Sydney 8.9 (57)	Barry Plant Park	Report
Saturday, 24 May (2:05pm)	Northern Bullants 7.8 (50)	def. by	Casey 17.19 (121)	Genis Steel Oval	Report
Saturday, 24 May (4:05pm)	Carlton 12.7 (79)	def. by	Williamstown 17.15 (117)	Ikon Park	Report
Saturday, 24 May (7:10pm)	Richmond 10.14 (74)	def.	Essendon 7.10 (52)	Kinetic Stadium	Report
Sunday, 25 May (11:00am)	Greater Western Sydney 12.12 (84)	def. by	Port Melbourne 16.14 (110)	Albury Sports Ground	Report
Sunday, 25 May (11:05am)	Sandringham 11.6 (72)	drew with	Gold Coast 10.12 (72)	RSEA Park	Report
Sunday, 25 May (2:05pm)	Collingwood 7.9 (51)	def. by	North Melbourne 19.9 (123)	Victoria Park	Report
	Bye; Werribee
Sandringham's Jack Carroll kicked a goal after the final siren to draw the match against Gold Coast.; In one of the longest recorded goals in VFA/VFL history, Sydney's Jordan Endemann kicked a goal from approximately 109 metres away in the first quarter of the match against Coburg.

=== Round 10 ===
	Round 10
Friday, 30 May (12:05pm)	Brisbane 18.11 (119)	def.	Essendon 15.9 (99)	Brighton Homes Arena	Report
Saturday, 31 May (9:35am)	Gold Coast 7.5 (47)	def. by	Coburg 21.9 (135)	People First Stadium	Report
Saturday, 31 May (11:35am)	Northern Bullants 10.7 (67)	def. by	Southport 27.14 (176)	Genis Steel Oval	Report
Saturday, 31 May (12:30pm)	Greater Western Sydney 12.8 (80)	def. by	Richmond 13.14 (92)	ENGIE Stadium	Report
Saturday, 31 May (1:35pm)	Sydney 9.7 (61)	def. by	Casey 24.11 (155)	Tramway Oval	Report
Saturday, 31 May (2:05pm)	Box Hill 9.7 (61)	def. by	Collingwood 11.12 (78)	Box Hill City Oval (crowd: 1,742)	Report
Saturday, 31 May (7:10pm)	Frankston 15.10 (100)	def.	Sandringham 9.10 (64)	Kinetic Stadium (crowd: 1,358)	Report
Sunday, 1 June (2:05pm)	Port Melbourne 5.11 (41)	def. by	Werribee 7.7 (49)	ETU Stadium	Report
Sunday, 1 June (2:05pm)	Williamstown 10.14 (74)	def.	Geelong 6.12 (48)	DSV Stadium	Report
	Bye; Carlton, Footscray, North Melbourne
The Northern Bullants vs Southport match, which was scheduled to be played at RMIT Oval in Bundoora, was moved to Genis Steel Oval.; Southport's Hugh Dixon kicked 13 goals against the Bullants. This was the most goals from a player in the VFL since Werribee's Jack Aziz kicked 15 goals against Coburg in round 15 of the 1997 season.; Gold Coast's 88-point loss to Coburg set a new record as its biggest-ever loss as a reserves team in the VFL, surpassing the 84-point loss to Box Hill two weeks earlier in round 8.

=== Round 11 ===
	Round 11
Saturday, 7 June (11:00am)	Greater Western Sydney 23.12 (150)	def.	Northern Bullants 7.5 (47)	Blacktown ISP Oval	Report
Saturday, 7 June (11:05am)	Richmond 8.16 (64)	def.	Sydney 9.5 (59)	Holm Park	Report
Saturday, 7 June (1:05pm)	Brisbane 12.8 (80)	def. by	Williamstown 21.10 (136)	Brighton Homes Arena	Report
Saturday, 7 June (1:05pm)	Werribee 6.8 (44)	def. by	North Melbourne 13.7 (85)	Avalon Airport Oval	Report
Saturday, 7 June (1:05pm)	Coburg 9.13 (67)	def. by	Footscray 17.9 (111)	Barry Plant Park	Report
Saturday, 7 June (2:05pm)	Box Hill 21.9 (135)	def.	Frankston 10.12 (72)	Box Hill City Oval (crowd: 1,321)	Report
Saturday, 7 June (7:10pm)	Collingwood 7.6 (48)	def. by	Casey 7.15 (57)	Mission Whitten Oval	Report
Sunday, 8 June (11:05am)	Geelong 10.12 (72)	def.	Gold Coast 11.3 (69)	GMHBA Stadium	Report
Sunday, 8 June (2:05pm)	Essendon 8.6 (54)	def. by	Carlton 10.12 (72)	Windy Hill	Report
	Bye; Port Melbourne, Sandringham, Southport

=== Round 12 ===
	Round 12
Friday, 13 June (7:35pm)	Frankston 12.13 (85)	def. by	Footscray 15.12 (102)	Kinetic Stadium (crowd: 1,235)	Report
Saturday, 14 June (11:35am)	Werribee 12.7 (79)	def. by	Geelong 11.15 (81)	Avalon Airport Oval	Report
Saturday, 14 June (12:05pm)	Sandringham 6.9 (45)	def. by	Southport 16.14 (110)	RSEA Park	Report
Saturday, 14 June (2:05pm)	North Melbourne 11.7 (73)	def. by	Port Melbourne 14.12 (96)	Arden Street Oval	Report
Saturday, 14 June (2:05pm)	Coburg 7.8 (50)	def. by	Box Hill 12.16 (88)	Barry Plant Park	Report
Saturday, 14 June (7:10pm)	Casey 17.10 (112)	def.	Essendon 12.11 (83)	ETU Stadium	Report
Sunday, 15 June (12:05pm)	Brisbane 24.15 (159)	def.	Greater Western Sydney 11.8 (74)	Brighton Homes Arena	Report
Sunday, 15 June (2:05pm)	Northern Bullants 4.12 (36)	def. by	Carlton 18.14 (122)	Genis Steel Oval	Report
	Bye; Collingwood, Gold Coast, Richmond, Sydney, Williamstown

=== Round 13 ===
	Round 13
Saturday, 21 June (11:05am)	Geelong 12.13 (85)	def. by	Brisbane 16.21 (117)	GMHBA Stadium	Report
Saturday, 21 June (12:05pm)	Southport 12.14 (86)	def. by	Sydney 12.20 (92)	Fankhauser Reserve	Report
Saturday, 21 June (2:05pm)	Collingwood 14.9 (93)	def.	Sandringham 14.6 (90)	AIA Vitality Centre	Report
Saturday, 21 June (2:05pm)	Port Melbourne 8.19 (67)	def. by	Coburg 11.11 (77)	ETU Stadium	Report
Saturday, 21 June (3:05pm)	Williamstown 13.15 (93)	def.	Werribee 11.6 (72)	DSV Stadium	Report
Saturday, 21 June (4:05pm)	Carlton 10.13 (73)	def. by	North Melbourne 11.8 (74)	Ikon Park	Report
Saturday, 21 June (7:10pm)	Frankston 9.12 (66)	def.	Essendon 9.6 (60)	Kinetic Stadium (crowd: 1,442)	Report
Sunday, 22 June (9:15am)	Greater Western Sydney 15.3 (93)	def.	Gold Coast 12.8 (80)	ENGIE Stadium	Report
Sunday, 22 June (11:35am)	Footscray 13.12 (90)	def.	Richmond 6.9 (45)	Marvel Stadium	Report
	Bye; Box Hill, Casey, Northern Bullants
The Collingwood vs Sandringham match was moved from 11:05am to 2:05pm.; Collingwood's Charlie West kicked a goal after the final siren to defeat Sandringham.; Williamstown played its 2600th senior match in the VFA/VFL, becoming the first club in the competition to reach the milestone.; The Greater Western Sydney v Gold Coast match, which was scheduled to be played at Blacktown ISP Oval at 9:30am, was moved to ENGIE Stadium as a curtain-raiser to the round 15 AFL match between the same clubs.

=== Round 14 ===
	Round 14
Friday, 27 June (2:05pm)	Sydney 8.11 (59)	def. by	Footscray 10.13 (73)	Tramway Oval	Report
Saturday, 28 June (9:35am)	Gold Coast 15.7 (97)	def.	Casey 13.10 (88)	People First Stadium	Report
Saturday, 28 June (12:05pm)	North Melbourne 9.9 (63)	def. by	Box Hill 19.9 (123)	Arden Street Oval	Report
Saturday, 28 June (12:05pm)	Southport 9.10 (64)	def. by	Collingwood 10.13 (73)	Fankhauser Reserve	Report
Saturday, 28 June (2:05pm)	Northern Bullants 5.8 (38)	def. by	Richmond 14.12 (96)	Genis Steel Oval	Report
Saturday, 28 June (2:35pm)	Williamstown 17.7 (109)	def.	Sandringham 14.14 (98)	DSV Stadium	Report
Saturday, 28 June (7:10pm)	Port Melbourne 11.17 (83)	def. by	Carlton 14.10 (94)	ETU Stadium	Report
Sunday, 29 June (1:05pm)	Coburg 9.10 (64)	def. by	Frankston 13.13 (91)	Barry Plant Park	Report
	Bye; Brisbane, Essendon, Geelong, Greater Western Sydney, Werribee

=== Round 15 ===
	Round 15
Friday, 4 July (4:05pm)	Footscray 13.9 (87)	def.	North Melbourne 10.11 (71)	Mission Whitten Oval	Report
Saturday, 5 July (12:05pm)	Brisbane 14.13 (97)	def. by	Southport 19.13 (127)	Brighton Homes Arena	Report
Saturday, 5 July (12:05pm)	Werribee 8.11 (59)	def. by	Greater Western Sydney 11.12 (78)	Avalon Airport Oval	Report
Saturday, 5 July (1:05pm)	Sydney 8.18 (66)	def. by	Northern Bullants 11.7 (73)	Blacktown ISP Oval	Report
Saturday, 5 July (1:05pm)	Essendon 13.8 (86)	def. by	Gold Coast 14.16 (100)	NEC Hangar	Report
Saturday, 5 July (2:05pm)	Port Melbourne 11.6 (72)	def. by	Williamstown 14.5 (89)	ETU Stadium	Report
Saturday, 5 July (7:10pm)	Collingwood 11.13 (79)	def. by	Carlton 12.11 (83)	Ikon Park	Report
Sunday, 6 July (12:05pm)	Richmond 14.4 (88)	def.	Geelong 12.11 (83)	GMHBA Stadium	Report
Sunday, 6 July (2:05pm)	Box Hill 14.16 (100)	def.	Sandringham 8.8 (56)	Box Hill City Oval (crowd: 2,062)	Report
Sunday, 6 July (2:35pm)	Casey 9.17 (71)	def. by	Coburg 11.8 (74)	Casey Fields	Report
	Bye; Frankston
This was the first win for the Northern Bullants in 398 days, ending a 21-match losing streak that began in round 12 of the 2024 season.; Three matches were impacted by venue changes: Sydney vs Northern Bullants was moved from Tramway Oval to Blacktown ISP Oval, Essendon vs Gold Coast was moved from Windy Hill to the NEC Hangar, and Collingwood vs Carlton was moved from Kinetic Stadium to Ikon Park.

=== Round 16 ===
	Round 16
Friday, 11 July (12:05pm)	Carlton 11.8 (74)	def. by	Brisbane 14.14 (98)	Ikon Park	Report
Friday, 11 July (3:35pm)	Gold Coast 14.16 (100)	def. by	Collingwood 15.12 (102)	People First Stadium	Report
Friday, 11 July (7:35pm)	Frankston 16.12 (108)	def.	Port Melbourne 11.7 (73)	Kinetic Stadium (crowd: 1,103)	Report
Saturday, 12 July (12:05pm)	Richmond 12.15 (77)	def. by	Southport 15.15 (105)	Kinetic Stadium	Report
Saturday, 12 July (12:15pm)	Greater Western Sydney 9.11 (65)	def. by	Geelong 18.7 (115)	ENGIE Stadium	Report
Saturday, 12 July (2:05pm)	Box Hill 20.14 (134)	def.	Essendon 9.11 (65)	Box Hill City Oval (crowd: 1,820)	Report
Saturday, 12 July (7:10pm)	Werribee 5.5 (35)	def. by	Casey 16.15 (111)	Mission Whitten Oval	Report
Sunday, 13 July (11:05am)	Sandringham 19.12 (126)	def.	Sydney 9.12 (66)	Trevor Barker Beach Oval	Report
Sunday, 13 July (2:05pm)	Northern Bullants 13.7 (85)	def.	Williamstown 11.11 (77)	Genis Steel Oval	Report
	Bye; Coburg, Footscray, North Melbourne
After trailing by 34 points at three-quarter-time, the Northern Bullants kicked seven goals to Williamstown's two behinds in the fourth quarter to win the match. It was a significant upset, as Williamstown were fifth on the ladder at the start of round 16, with CODE Sports describing the result as "perhaps the biggest upset in the VFL this century". It was subsequently the Bullants' final victory in its history.

=== Round 17 ===
	Round 17
Friday, July 18 (2:05pm)	Essendon 12.8 (80)	def. by	Greater Western Sydney 15.11 (101)	Windy Hill	Report
Saturday, 19 July (12:05pm)	Sydney 14.8 (92)	def.	North Melbourne 11.15 (81)	Tramway Oval	Report
Saturday, 19 July (12:05pm)	Port Melbourne 8.8 (56)	def. by	Gold Coast 10.9 (69)	ETU Stadium	Report
Saturday, 19 July (12:35pm)	Brisbane 12.16 (88)	def. by	Footscray 17.12 (114)	Brighton Homes Arena	Report
Saturday, 19 July (7:10pm)	Geelong 8.12 (60)	def. by	Collingwood 11.9 (75)	Mission Whitten Oval	Report
Sunday, 20 July (1:05pm)	Coburg 10.9 (69)	def. by	Werribee 13.11 (89)	Barry Plant Park	Report
Sunday, 20 July (1:05pm)	Casey 22.18 (150)	def.	Carlton 6.6 (42)	Casey Fields	Report
Sunday, 20 July (2:05pm)	Williamstown 13.4 (82)	def. by	Box Hill 13.14 (92)	DSV Stadium	Report
Sunday, 20 July (2:05pm)	Northern Bullants 10.9 (69)	def. by	Frankston 22.9 (141)	Genis Steel Oval	Report
	Bye; Richmond, Sandringham, Southport

=== Round 18 ===
	Round 18
Friday, 25 July (3:35pm)	Greater Western Sydney 11.5 (71)	def. by	Sydney 14.15 (99)	ENGIE Stadium	Report
Saturday, 26 July (10:15am)	Gold Coast 11.7 (73)	def. by	Brisbane 12.10 (82)	People First Stadium	Report
Saturday, 26 July (12:05pm)	Southport 17.10 (112)	def.	Williamstown 14.6 (90)	Fankhauser Reserve	Report
Saturday, 26 July (1:05pm)	Essendon 5.2 (32)	def. by	Footscray 13.17 (95)	NEC Hangar	Report
Saturday, 26 July (1:05pm)	Werribee 7.11 (53)	def. by	Richmond 15.9 (99)	Avalon Airport Oval	Report
Saturday, 26 July (7:10pm)	Frankston 16.10 (106)	def.	Collingwood 10.10 (70)	Kinetic Stadium (crowd: 5,561)	Report
Sunday, 27 July (11:05am)	Casey 18.15 (123)	def.	Sandringham 9.6 (60)	Casey Fields	Report
Sunday, 27 July (12:05pm)	North Melbourne 15.12 (102)	def. by	Geelong 16.8 (104)	Arden Street Oval	Report
Sunday, 27 July (2:05pm)	Northern Bullants 9.16 (70)	def. by	Coburg 13.7 (85)	Genis Steel Oval	Report
	Bye; Box Hill, Carlton, Port Melbourne
Two matches were impacted by venue changes: Gold Coast vs Brisbane was moved from Austworld Centre Oval to People First Stadium as a curtain-raiser to the round 20 AFL match between the same clubs, and Essendon vs Footscray was moved from Windy Hill to the NEC Hangar.; Geelong's Tobyn Murray was awarded a free kick in the final seconds of the match against North Melbourne, followed by a 50-metre penalty, giving him a shot on the goal line which resulted in a kick after the final siren to win the match.

=== Round 19 ===
	Round 19
Friday, 1 August (2:05pm)	Footscray 13.13 (91)	def.	Greater Western Sydney 7.8 (50)	Mission Whitten Oval	Report
Saturday, 2 August (11:35am)	Southport 8.5 (53)	def. by	Box Hill 14.13 (97)	Fankhauser Reserve	Report
Saturday, 2 August (12:05pm)	Sydney 15.10 (100)	def.	Essendon 9.11 (65)	Tramway Oval	Report
Saturday, 2 August (12:25pm)	Gold Coast 10.18 (78)	def.	Richmond 9.7 (61)	People First Stadium	Report
Saturday, 2 August (1:05pm)	Coburg 13.8 (86)	def. by	Brisbane 17.10 (112)	Barry Plant Park	Report
Saturday, 2 August (2:05pm)	Williamstown 15.7 (97)	def. by	Collingwood 16.12 (108)	DSV Stadium	Report
Saturday, 2 August (2:05pm)	Port Melbourne 17.13 (115)	def.	Northern Bullants 10.11 (71)	ETU Stadium	Report
Saturday, 2 August (7:10pm)	Frankston 15.8 (98)	def.	Carlton 11.8 (74)	Kinetic Stadium (crowd: 2,008)	Report
Sunday, 3 August (2:05pm)	Sandringham 19.15 (129)	def.	North Melbourne 16.10 (106)	Trevor Barker Beach Oval	Report
	Bye; Casey, Geelong, Werribee

=== Round 20 ===
	Round 20
Saturday, 9 August (11:05am)	Brisbane 11.13 (79)	def. by	Casey 12.11 (83)	Brighton Homes Arena	Report
Saturday, 9 August (12:05pm)	Werribee 9.13 (67)	def. by	Southport 12.8 (80)	Avalon Airport Oval	Report
Saturday, 9 August (12:05pm)	Geelong 10.13 (73)	def.	Essendon 9.5 (59)	GMHBA Stadium	Report
Saturday, 9 August (2:05pm)	Box Hill 7.12 (54)	def. by	Footscray 11.7 (73)	Box Hill City Oval (crowd: 2,251)	Report
Saturday, 9 August (7:10pm)	Richmond 18.7 (115)	def.	Sandringham 11.8 (74)	Kinetic Stadium	Report
Sunday, 10 August (11:05am)	Carlton 12.16 (88)	def.	Gold Coast 9.10 (64)	Ikon Park	Report
Sunday, 10 August (1:05pm)	Coburg 13.12 (90)	def.	Port Melbourne 10.12 (72)	Barry Plant Park	Report
Sunday, 10 August (2:05pm)	North Melbourne 12.6 (78)	def. by	Frankston 13.12 (90)	Arden Street Oval	Report
	Bye; Collingwood, Greater Western Sydney, Northern Bullants, Sydney, Williamstown

=== Round 21 ===
	Round 21
Saturday, 16 August (11:05am)	Southport 15.13 (103)	def.	North Melbourne 12.9 (81)	Fankhauser Reserve	Report
Saturday, 16 August (2:05pm)	Northern Bullants 5.11 (41)	def. by	Werribee 12.14 (86)	Genis Steel Oval	Report
Saturday, 16 August (2:05pm)	Port Melbourne 11.12 (78)	def.	Collingwood 10.10 (70)	ETU Stadium	Report
Saturday, 16 August (2:10pm)	Sandringham 7.12 (54)	def. by	Essendon 17.13 (115)	Trevor Barker Beach Oval	Report
Saturday, 16 August (3:45pm)	Gold Coast 14.10 (94)	def.	Greater Western Sydney 9.10 (64)	People First Stadium	Report
Sunday, 17 August (11:35am)	Sydney 10.6 (66)	def. by	Geelong 16.15 (111)	Tramway Oval	Report
Sunday, 17 August (12:05pm)	Footscray 21.20 (146)	def.	Carlton 4.7 (31)	Mission Whitten Oval	Report
Sunday, 17 August (1:05pm)	Casey 12.16 (88)	def.	Box Hill 9.11 (65)	Casey Fields	Report
Sunday, 17 August (1:05pm)	Frankston 13.11 (89)	drew with	Brisbane 13.11 (89)	Kinetic Stadium (crowd: 2,524)	Report
Sunday, 17 August (2:05pm)	Williamstown 9.19 (73)	def.	Richmond 8.4 (52)	DSV Stadium	Report
	Bye; Coburg
Frankston's Nick Burke kicked a goal after the final siren to draw the match against Brisbane.

== Ladder ==
Pos	Team	Pld	W	L	D	PF	PA	PP	Pts	Qualification
1	Footscray (R) (P)	18	15	3	0	1670	1146	145.7	60	Qualifying and elimination finals
2	Box Hill	18	14	4	0	1726	1266	136.3	56	Qualifying and elimination finals
3	Southport	18	13	4	1	1808	1368	132.2	54	Qualifying and elimination finals
4	Frankston	18	12	5	1	1630	1466	111.2	50	Qualifying and elimination finals
5	Casey	18	11	6	1	1743	1286	135.5	46	Qualifying and elimination finals
6	Brisbane (R)	18	11	6	1	1748	1605	108.9	46	Qualifying and elimination finals
7	Collingwood (R)	18	11	7	0	1532	1511	101.4	44	Wildcard finals
8	Richmond (R)	18	11	7	0	1365	1366	99.9	44	Wildcard finals
9	Greater Western Sydney (R)	18	10	8	0	1637	1443	113.4	40	Wildcard finals
10	Williamstown	18	10	8	0	1574	1504	104.7	40	Wildcard finals
11	Coburg	18	9	9	0	1525	1452	105.0	36	
12	Geelong (R)	18	9	9	0	1472	1466	100.4	36	
13	Carlton (R)	18	8	10	0	1387	1586	87.5	32	
14	Gold Coast (R)	18	7	10	1	1466	1493	98.2	30	
15	North Melbourne (R)	18	7	10	1	1500	1528	98.2	30	
16	Werribee	18	7	11	0	1325	1378	96.2	28	
17	Port Melbourne	18	6	11	1	1396	1399	99.8	26	
18	Sydney (R)	18	5	13	0	1240	1657	74.8	20	
19	Essendon (R)	18	4	14	0	1338	1560	85.8	16	
20	Sandringham	18	3	14	1	1286	1772	72.6	14	
21	Northern Bullants	18	2	16	0	1024	2140	47.9	8	

Source: AFL.com.au
Rules for classification: 1) points; 2) percentage; 3) number of points for
(R) Club is the reserves team of a senior club of the Australian Football League
(P) Premiers

== Progression by round ==
Numbers highlighted in green indicate that the team finished the round inside the top 10.
Numbers highlighted in blue indicates the team finished first on the ladder in that round.
Numbers highlighted in red indicates the team finished in last place on the ladder in that round.
Underlined numbers indicate that the team had a bye during that round.

Team ╲ Round	1	2	3	4	5	6	7	8	9	10	11	12	13	14	15	16	17	18	19	20	21
Box Hill	4	8	8	12	16	16	20	24	28	28	32	36	36	40	44	48	52	52	56	56	56
Brisbane	4	4	4	8	12	16	20	20	20	24	24	28	32	32	32	36	36	40	44	44	46
Carlton	0	0	0	0	4	4	8	12	12	12	16	20	20	24	28	28	28	28	28	32	32
Casey	2	6	6	6	10	10	10	10	14	18	22	26	26	26	26	30	34	38	38	42	46
Coburg	0	0	0	4	4	8	8	12	16	20	20	20	24	24	28	28	28	32	32	36	36
Collingwood	4	4	8	8	12	12	16	20	20	24	24	24	28	32	32	36	40	40	44	44	44
Essendon	4	4	4	8	8	8	12	12	12	12	12	12	12	12	12	12	12	12	12	12	16
Footscray	4	4	8	8	8	12	16	16	20	20	24	28	32	36	36	40	44	48	52	56	60
Frankston	0	4	4	8	12	12	16	16	16	20	20	20	24	28	28	32	36	40	44	48	50
Geelong	4	8	12	12	12	12	12	12	12	12	16	20	20	20	20	24	24	28	28	32	36
Gold Coast	0	0	4	4	8	8	8	8	10	10	10	10	10	14	18	18	22	22	26	26	30
Greater Western Sydney	0	4	8	12	16	20	24	24	24	24	28	28	32	32	36	36	40	40	40	40	40
North Melbourne	2	2	6	10	10	14	14	18	22	22	26	26	30	30	30	30	30	30	30	30	30
Northern Bullants	0	0	0	0	0	0	0	0	0	0	0	0	0	0	4	8	8	8	8	8	8
Port Melbourne	0	0	0	0	0	4	6	10	14	14	14	18	18	18	18	18	18	18	22	22	26
Richmond	4	8	12	12	12	16	16	16	20	24	28	28	28	32	36	36	36	40	40	44	44
Sandringham	0	0	0	4	4	4	4	4	6	6	6	6	6	6	6	10	10	10	14	14	14
Southport	4	8	12	16	16	16	18	22	26	30	30	34	34	34	38	42	42	46	46	50	54
Sydney	0	0	0	4	4	4	4	4	4	4	4	4	8	8	8	8	12	16	20	20	20
Werribee	0	4	4	4	8	12	12	16	16	20	20	20	20	20	20	20	24	24	24	24	28
Williamstown	0	0	4	4	4	8	8	12	16	20	24	24	28	32	36	36	36	36	36	36	40

== Finals series ==
Wildcard finals
24 August, Victoria Park
7	Collingwood	9.15 (69)
10	Williamstown	11.15 (81)
23 August, ETU Stadium
8	Richmond	17.14 (116)
9	Greater Western Sydney	14.14 (98)

Qualifying and elimination finals
30 August, Mission Whitten Oval
1	Footscray	15.15 (105)
4	Frankston	3.7 (25)
30 August, Casey Fields
5	Casey	20.12 (132)
Williamstown	8.8 (56)
30 August, Brighton Homes Arena
6	Brisbane	12.15 (87)
Richmond	10.7 (67)
30 August, Box Hill City Oval
2	Box Hill	13.16 (94)
3	Southport	18.7 (115)

Semi-finals
6 September, Kinetic Stadium
Frankston	16.5 (101)
Casey	13.12 (90)
6 September, Box Hill City Oval
Box Hill	18.7 (115)
Brisbane	16.16 (112)

Preliminary finals
13 September, Mission Whitten Oval
Footscray	16.12 (108)
Box Hill	11.11 (77)
13 September, Fankhauser Reserve
Southport	21.17 (143)
Frankston	8.7 (55)

Grand final
21 September, Ikon Park
Footscray	14.5 (89)
Southport	11.13 (79)

All starting times are local time. Source: afl.com.au

=== Wildcard finals ===
	Wildcard finals
WR2: Saturday, 23 August (12:10pm)	Richmond 17.14 (116)	def.	Greater Western Sydney 14.14 (98)	ETU Stadium	Report
WR1: Sunday, 24 August (2:05pm)	Collingwood 9.15 (69)	def. by	Williamstown 11.15 (81)	Victoria Park	Report

=== Qualifying finals and elimination finals ===
	Qualifying finals
QF1: Saturday, 30 August (12:35pm)	Footscray 15.15 (105)	def.	Frankston 3.7 (25)	Mission Whitten Oval	Report
QF2: Saturday, 30 August (12:35pm)	Box Hill 13.16 (94)	def. by	Southport 18.7 (115)	Box Hill City Oval (crowd: 1,875)	Report
Frankston's score of 3.7 (25) was the lowest score in the finals series since the VFL era began in 1996, breaking the previous record of 3.9 (27) set by Collingwood in 2023.

	Elimination finals
EF1: Saturday, 30 August (2:10pm)	Casey 20.12 (132)	def.	Williamstown 8.8 (56)	Casey Fields	Report
EF2: Saturday, 30 August (12:05pm)	Brisbane 12.15 (87)	def.	Richmond 10.7 (67)	Brighton Homes Arena	Report

=== Semi-finals ===
	Semi-finals
SF2: Saturday, 6 September (11:40am)	Box Hill 18.7 (115)	def.	Brisbane 16.16 (112)	Box Hill City Oval (crowd: 2,312)	Report
SF1: Saturday, 6 September (7:35pm)	Frankston 16.5 (101)	def.	Casey 13.12 (90)	Kinetic Stadium (crowd: 4,420)	Report
After being kept scoreless in the third quarter, Box Hill kicked nine goals in the fourth quarter to defeat Brisbane, with Bodie Ryan kicking a goal after the final siren to win the match.

=== Preliminary finals ===
	Preliminary finals
PF2: Saturday, 13 September (11:25am)	Southport 21.17 (143)	def.	Frankston 8.7 (55)	Fankhauser Reserve	Report
PF1: Saturday, 13 September (2:10pm)	Footscray 16.12 (108)	def.	Box Hill 11.11 (77)	Mission Whitten Oval (crowd: 5,106)	Report

=== Grand Final ===
2025 VFL Grand Final
Sunday, 21 September (2:15pm)	Footscray	def.	Southport	Ikon Park (crowd: 8,818)	Report
6.1 (37); 10.3 (63); 10.4 (64); 14.5 (89)	Q1; Q2; Q3; Final	1.3 (9); 4.4 (28); 8.10 (58); 11.13 (79)	Umpires: S. Ferguson, J. Clamp, J. O'Brien; Norm Goss Memorial Medal: Cooper Craig-Peters; Television broadcast: Seven Network; National anthem: Sam + Sam
A. Scott 2, W. Lewis 2, J. Dolan 2, B. Crofts 2, C. Poulter, D. Orgill, J. Croft, C. Craig-Peters, J. Busslinger, O. Baker	Goals	B. Woodcock 3, H. Oea 2, Z. Foot 2, W. Buzza 2, J. Gore, H. Dixon
C. Craig-Peters, B. Crofts, A. Scott, L. Jones, O. Baker, D. Orgill	Best	B. Woodcock, J. Dawson, J. Joyce, Z. Foot, H. Oea
Cooper Craig-Peters polled the maximum 12 votes to win the Norm Goss Memorial Medal as best on ground.

==== Teams ====
Footscray
B:	5. Jedd Busslinger	19. Liam Jones	17. Nick Coffield
HB:	15. Taylor Duryea	43. Ryan Gardner	11. Lachie Jaques
C:	13. Oskar Baker	1. Adam Treloar	32. Arthur Jones
HF:	26. Josh Dolan	25. Caleb Poulter	6. Cooper Hynes
F:	35. Luke Kennedy	16. Jordan Croft	64. Will Lewis
Foll:	40. Lachlan Smith	28. Anthony Scott	50. Daniel Orgill (c)
Int:	37. Michael Sellwood	54. Billy Crofts	61. Cooper Craig-Peters
Int:	41. Zac Walker	53. Fred Valpied	
Coach:	Stewart Edge		

Southport
B:	16. Jack Sexton	6. Max Spencer	14. Matt McGuinness
HB:	25. Jesse Joyce	30. Nick Williams	11. Will Sexton
C:	4. Michael Manteit	26. Elijah Reardon	12. Jay Lockhart
HF:	21. Jackson Edwards	42. Max Pescud	19. Josh Gore
F:	29. Hugh Dixon	15. Wylie Buzza	33. Campbell Lake
Foll:	20. Brayden Crossley (c)	3. Jacob Dawson (c)	2. Zac Foot
Int:	1. Boyd Woodcock	17. Keegan Grey	8. Hewago Oea
Int:	39. Finn Hay	32. Brock Aston	
Coach:	Matthew Primus		

== Awards ==
- J. J. Liston Trophy (best and fairest): Jacob Dawson (Southport) – 28 votes
- Fothergill–Round–Mitchell Medal (rising star): Tom Blamires (Frankston)
- Jim 'Frosty' Miller Medal (leading goalkicker): Brodie McLaughlin (Williamstown) – 67 goals
- Coaches MVP Award: Jacob Dawson (Southport) – 87 votes

=== Team of the Year ===
2025 VFL Team of the Year
B:	Donovan Toohey (Coburg)	Ryan Gardner (Footscray)	Luke Parks (Williamstown)
HB:	Riley Bonner (Casey)	Jai Serong (Box Hill)	Tom Blamires (Frankston)
C:	Jack Bytel (Coburg)	Henry Hustwaite (Box Hill)	Kye Declase (Box Hill)
HF:	Zac Foot (Southport)	Max Gruzewski (Greater Western Sydney)	Mitch Hardie (Casey)
F:	Mitch Podhajski (Coburg)	Brodie McLaughlin (Williamstown)	Will McLachlan (Brisbane)
Foll:	Ned Reeves (Box Hill)	Jacob Dawson (Southport) (c)	Dom Brew (Werribee)
Int:	Cooper Craig-Peters (Footscray)	Mutaz El-Nour (Richmond)	Harvey Hooper (Port Melbourne)
Int:	Liam McMahon (Carlton/Essendon)	Deven Robertson (Brisbane)	Joel Trudgeon (Coburg)
Coach:	Stewart Edge (Footscray)		

=== Club best and fairest ===
Club	Award	Winner	Ref
Box Hill	Col Austen Trophy	Jai Serong	
Brisbane	Neville Fallon Award	Luke Beecken	
Brisbane	Neville Fallon Award	Deven Robertson	
Carlton	Best and Fairest	Ethan Phillips	
Casey	Gardner Clark Medal	Riley Bonner	
Coburg	Jim Sullivan Medal	Donovan Toohey	
Coburg	Jim Sullivan Medal	Joel Trudgeon	
Collingwood	Joseph Wren Trophy	Harry De Mattia	
Essendon	Best and Fairest	Jackson Hately	
Footscray	Best and Fairest	Billy Crofts	
Frankston	Peter Geddes Medal	Tom Blamires	
Geelong	Best and Fairest	Marcus Herbert	
Gold Coast	Player of the Year	Ned Moyle	
Greater Western Sydney	Player of the Year	Max Gruzewski	
North Melbourne	John Law Medal	Darcy Macpherson	
Northern Bullants	Laurie Hill Trophy	Jean-Luc Velissaris	
Port Melbourne	Jack McFarlane Medal	Tom Hird	
Richmond	Guinane Medal	Mutaz El Nour	
Richmond	Guinane Medal	Lachlan Wilson	
Sandringham	Neil Bencraft Medal	Angus McLennan	
Southport	Doc Mackenzie Medal	Zac Foot	
Sydney	Player of the Year	Indhi Kirk	
Werribee	Bruce Montgomery Trophy	Dom Brew	
Williamstown	Gerry Callahan Medal	Luke Parks	

== Season notes ==
- Because of redevelopment at Swinburne Centre, Richmond played a number of its home games at Holm Park Recreation Reserve in Beaconsfield, where it had an agreement with Cardinia Shire Council. Additionally, Richmond was officially designated as the home team in its round 7 match against Casey at Casey Fields, as well as its round 9 match against Essendon at Windy Hill. Richmond's round 3 match against Brisbane was moved from Holm Park to Swinburne Centre, making it the only VFL match played at the venue for the 2025 season.
- On 30 June 2025, St Kilda announced it would end its reserves affiliation with Sandringham in the VFL following the 2025 season, with both clubs fielding their own teams in 2026.
- On 20 August 2025 (following the conclusion of the home-and-away season), the Northern Bullants reverted to being called the "Preston Football Club", a decision that was first announced three months earlier. At the same time, it was reported that the club could be in danger of folding because of debt, with the club asking the AFL to financially assist. Less than two months later, the club's VFL licence was revoked, excluding it from the league from 2026, and the club subsequently entered voluntary liquidation on 15 December 2025.

== Representative match ==
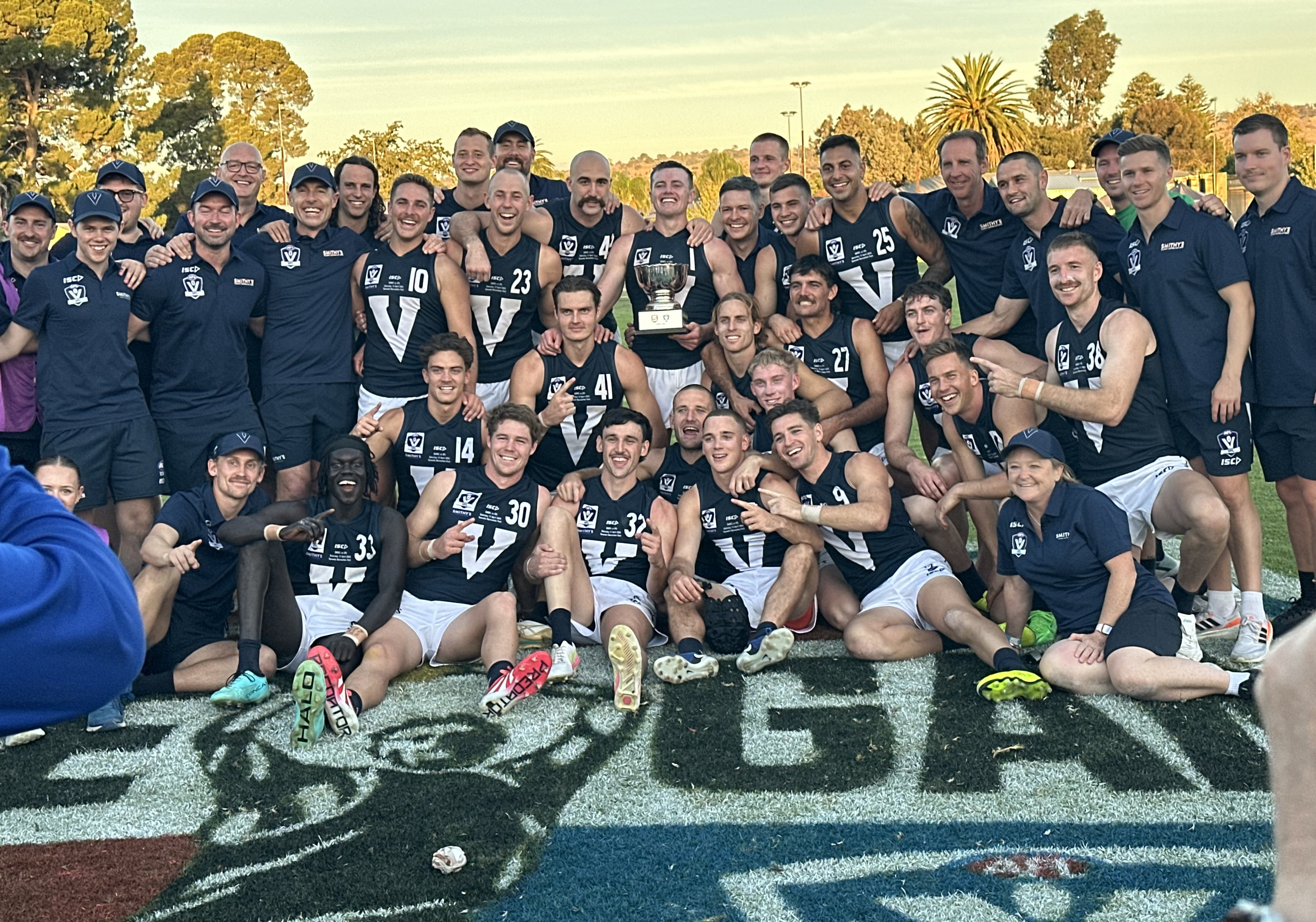
The VFL State Team after defeating the SANFL

An interstate representative match was played during the AFL Gather Round for the second consecutive season, taking place in Tanunda in the Barossa Valley region. Box Hill coach Zane Littlejohn was coach of the team.

=== Scoreboard ===
2025 AAMI State Game
Saturday, 12 April (2:45pm ACST)	SANFL	def. by	VFL	Tanunda Recreation Park
2.7 (19); 7.8 (50); 11.10 (76); 15.13 (103)	Q1; Q2; Q3; Final	4.0 (24); 8.2 (50); 12.6 (78); 18.6 (114)	Umpires: Sam Morgan, Mitch Scott, Joel Clamp; Television broadcast: Seven Network
McBean 5, Hosie 5, Hayes, Bell, Rowe, Mackinlay, Grace	Goals	McLaughlin 4, Heron 2, Woodcock 2, Lake 2, Pinnuck 2, Ellison, Tsitas, McMahon, Murphy, Harvey, Hooper, Bytel
Wigg, McBean, Bell, Hosie, Lyons, Lewis	Best	Woodcock, Heron, Brew, Pinnuck, Hooper, Lake
Corey Lyons won the Fos Williams Medal as the best on ground SANFL player.; Louis Pinnuck won the Frank Johnson Medal as the best on ground VFL player.

== See also ==
- 2025 VFL Women's season
