= Michael Sellwood =

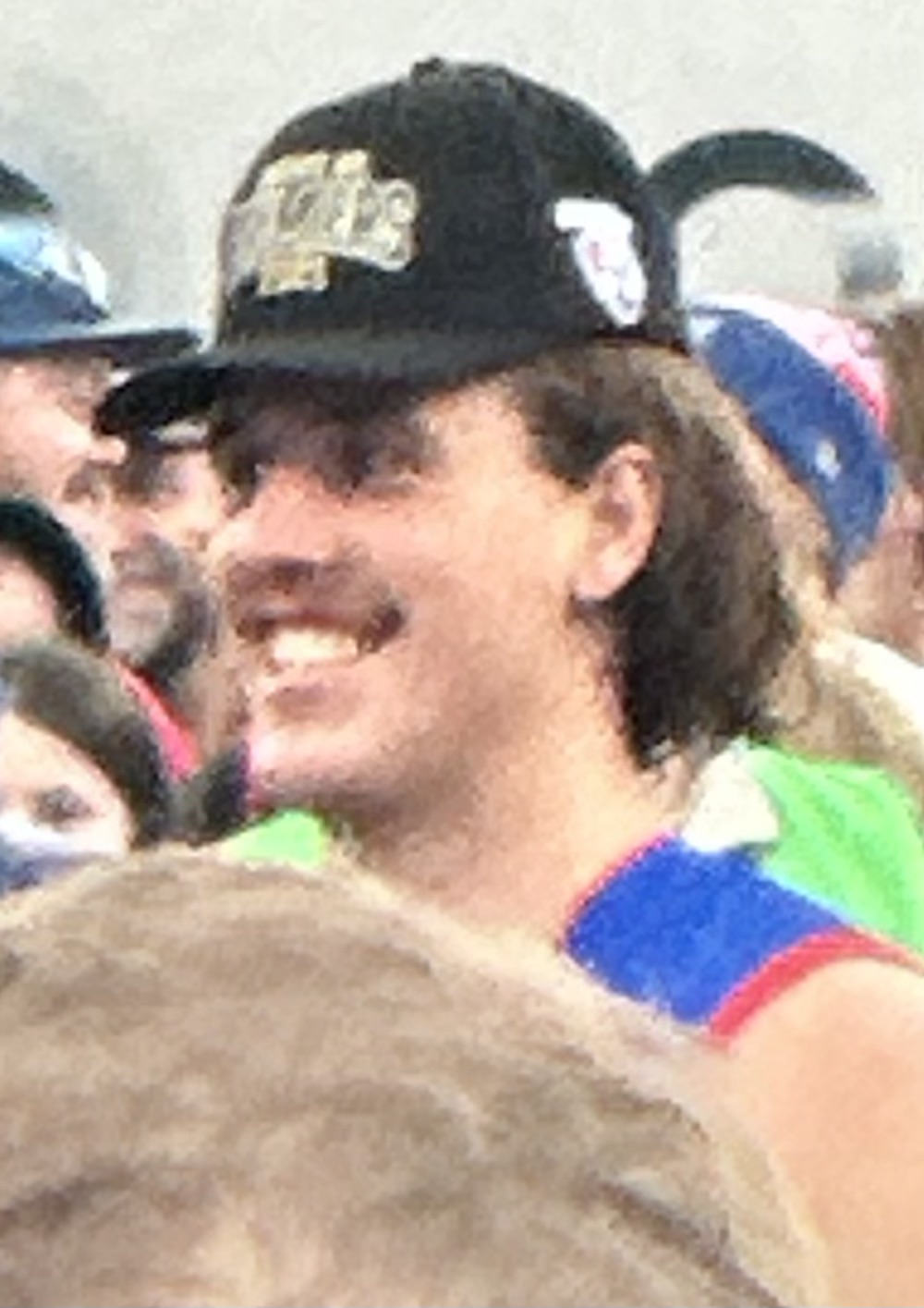
- Sellwood in September 2025

Personal information
- Born: 2 October 2003 (age 23)
- Original team: Baldivis Brumbies / Peel Thunder
- Draft: No. 5, 2025 mid-season rookie draft
- Debut: Opening Round, 2026, Western Bulldogs vs. Brisbane Lions, at The Gabba
- Height: 186 cm (6 ft 1 in)
- Position: Defender

Club information
- Current club: Western Bulldogs
- Number: 37

Playing career^{1}
Years	Club	Games (Goals)
2025–	Western Bulldogs	21 (0)
- ^{1} Playing statistics correct to the end of round 22, 2026.

Career highlights
- WAFL Premiership player: 2024; VFL Premiership player: 2025

Michael Sellwood (born 2 October 2003) is a professional Australian rules footballer who plays for the Western Bulldogs in the Australian Football League (AFL).

== Early life ==
Sellwood attended school at Aquinas College in Perth. He grew up on a six acre property in Baldivis as one of ten children and was homeschooled prior to attending Aquinas.

== Junior and WAFL career ==
Sellwood played junior football with the Baldivis Brumbies. He played WAFL Colts for Peel Thunder. In 2022, he was part of their premiership side, gathering 20 disposals in a two-point win.

In 2023, Sellwood was part of Peel Thunder's losing WAFL Grand Final team. He was part of the Thunder's victorious Grand Final side the following year.

== AFL career ==
Sellwood was selected by the Western Bulldogs with pick 5 of the 2025 mid-season rookie draft. He was part of the Bulldogs' 2025 VFL Premiership team. He made his AFL debut in Opening Round of the 2026 AFL season.

== Statistics ==
Updated to the end of round 22, 2026.

Legend
G	Goals	K	Kicks	D	Disposals	T	Tackles
B	Behinds	H	Handballs	M	Marks

Season	Team	No.	Games	Totals							Averages (per game)							Votes
Season	Team	No.	Games	G	B	K	H	D	M	T	G	B	K	H	D	M	T	Votes
2025	Western Bulldogs	37	0	—	—	—	—	—	—	—	—	—	—	—	—	—	—	0
2026	Western Bulldogs	37	21	0	0	168	100	268	95	56	0.0	0.0	8.0	4.8	12.8	4.5	2.7	0
Career			21	0	0	168	100	268	95	56	0.0	0.0	8.0	4.8	12.8	4.5	2.7	0
