= Jedd Busslinger =

Australian rules footballer

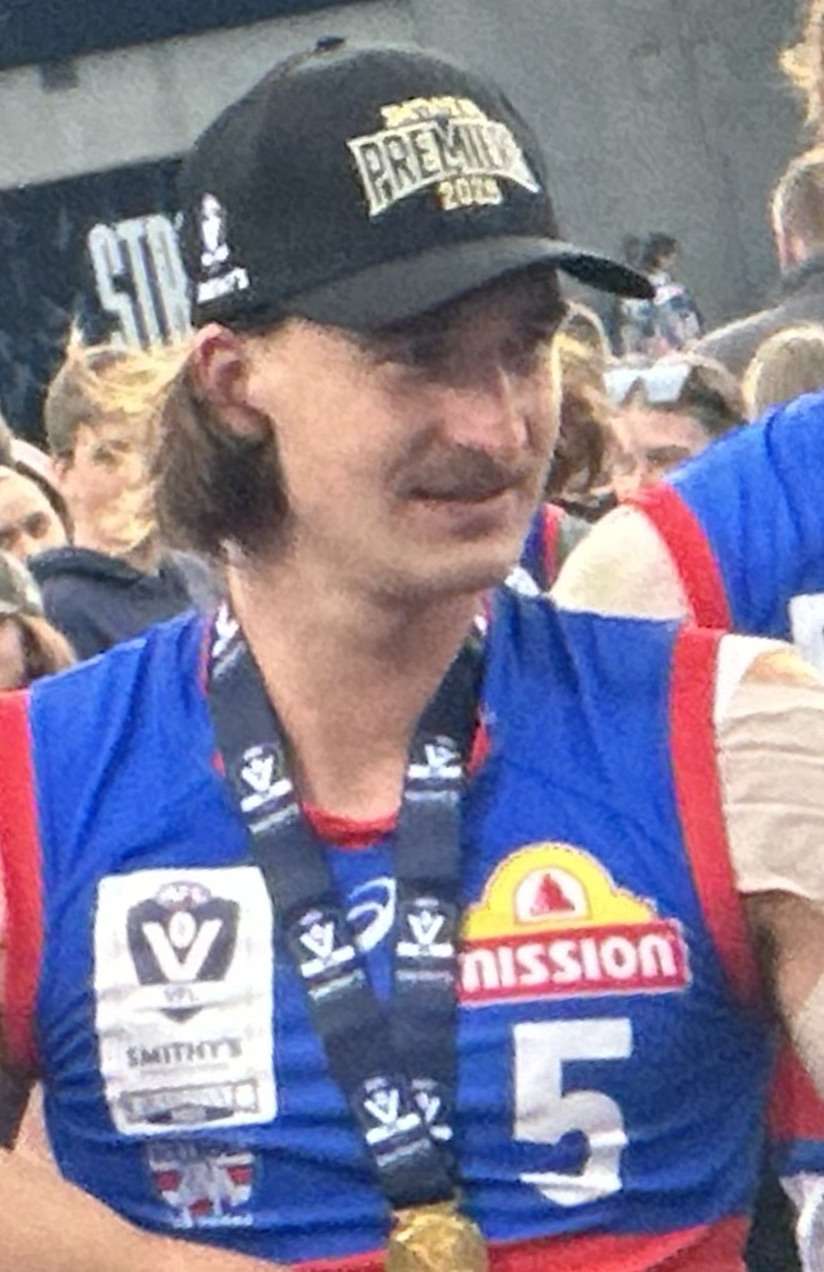
- Busslinger in September 2025

Personal information
- Nickname: The Buss
- Born: 11 March 2004 (age 22)
- Original teams: East Perth (WAFL); Coolbinia (PFL)
- Draft: No. 13, 2022 national draft
- Debut: 26 April 2025, Western Bulldogs vs. Greater Western Sydney, at Manuka Oval
- Height: 198 cm (6 ft 6 in)
- Weight: 85 kg (187 lb)
- Position: Key defender

Club information
- Current club: Western Bulldogs
- Number: 5

Playing career^{1}
Years	Club	Games (Goals)
2023–	Western Bulldogs	15 (0)
- ^{1} Playing statistics correct to the end of round 22, 2026.

Career highlights
- VFL Premiership player: 2025

Jedd Busslinger (born 11 March 2004) is a professional Australian rules footballer who plays for the Western Bulldogs in the Australian Football League (AFL).

== Early life ==
Growing up in Perth, Western Australia, Busslinger played for Coolbinia in the Perth Football League. He was named the Auskick footballer of the year in 2012. Busslinger later played for East Perth as a junior in the Western Australian Football League (WAFL).

He represented Western Australia at the AFL National Championships, and was among WA's best in matches against Vic Metro and the Allies, culminating in an All-Australian selection in the back line.

== AFL career ==
Busslinger was selected by the Western Bulldogs with the 13th pick in the 2022 national draft. In 2024, he extended his contract until the end of the 2026 season.

Busslinger made his AFL debut in round 7 of the 2025 AFL season, against the Greater Western Sydney Giants at Manuka Oval. He had seven senior appearances in his debut season and won the Victorian Football League (VFL) premiership with Footscray, the Bulldogs' reserves affiliate. Busslinger scored a goal in the grand final win against Southport. He looks to regain his spot in the senior side in 2026, with key defenders such as Rory Lobb, Buku Khamis and James O'Donnell currently ahead of him.

== Statistics ==
Updated to the end of round 22, 2026.

Legend
G	Goals	K	Kicks	D	Disposals	T	Tackles
B	Behinds	H	Handballs	M	Marks

Season	Team	No.	Games	Totals							Averages (per game)							Votes
Season	Team	No.	Games	G	B	K	H	D	M	T	G	B	K	H	D	M	T	Votes
2023	Western Bulldogs	5	0	—	—	—	—	—	—	—	—	—	—	—	—	—	—	0
2024	Western Bulldogs	5	0	—	—	—	—	—	—	—	—	—	—	—	—	—	—	0
2025	Western Bulldogs	5	7	0	0	50	18	68	29	2	0.0	0.0	7.1	2.6	9.7	4.1	0.3	0
2026	Western Bulldogs	5	8	0	0	95	34	129	37	3	0.0	0.0	11.9	4.3	16.1	4.6	0.4	0
Career			15	0	0	145	52	197	66	5	0.0	0.0	9.7	3.5	13.1	4.4	0.3	0
