= Zac Foot =

Australian rules footballer (born 2000)

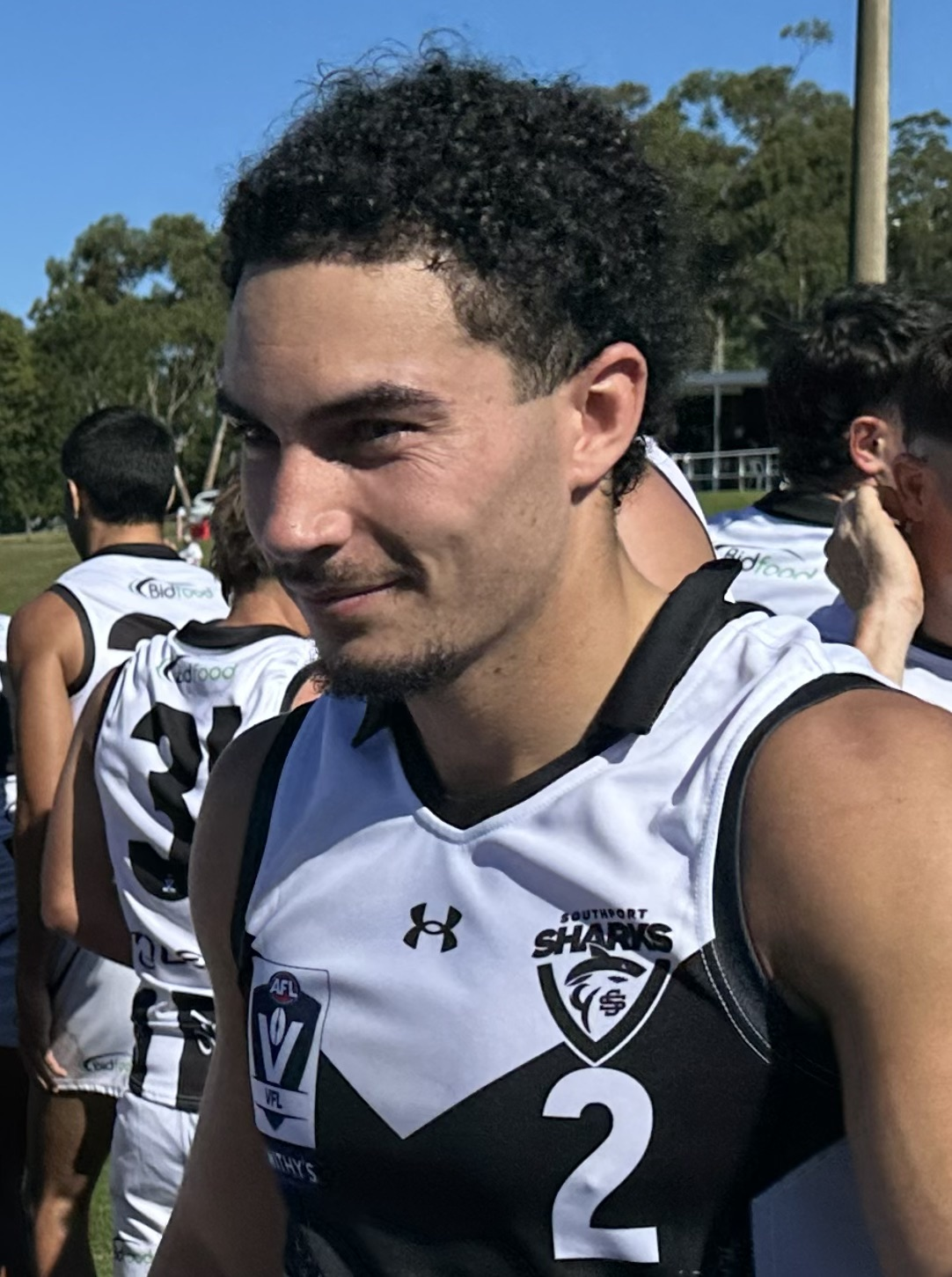
- Foot playing for Southport in 2026

Personal information
- Full name: Zac Foot
- Born: 24 December 2000 (age 25)
- Original team: Dandenong Stingrays (TAC Cup)
- Draft: No. 51, 2018 AFL draft, Sydney
- Height: 182 cm (6 ft 0 in)
- Weight: 85 kg (187 lb)
- Position: Midfielder/Forward

Club information
- Current club: Southport
- Number: 2

Playing career^{1}
Years	Club	Games (Goals)
2019–2020	Sydney	2 (1)
- ^{1} Playing statistics correct to the end of 2020.

Career highlights
- Doc Mackenzie Medal: 2025

Zac Foot (born 24 December 2000) is an Australian rules footballer who currently plays for the Southport Sharks in the Victorian Football League (VFL). He previously for the Sydney Swans in the Australian Football League (AFL).

== AFL career ==
Foot is of Jamaican and English descent via his mother's side of the family. His Australian father, Paul, was an U19s footballer with Melbourne Demons but never made it into the senior team. Foot was recruited by Sydney with the 51st draft pick in the 2018 AFL draft. He debuted in round 12, 2020, against the Greater Western Sydney Giants at Perth Stadium. At the conclusion of the 2020 season Foot was delisted and returned to Melbourne to play with Casey Demons in the VFL.

As of December 2025, Foot is trialling for an AFL list spot with Adelaide as the former Swan hopes to join a second club.

== VFL career ==
Foot played for the Casey in the Victorian Football League in 2021. Following that season, he moved north to play for Southport, who are based in Gold Coast, Australia.

He played for Southport in the club's six-point 2024 VFL grand final loss to Werribee. Following another grand final loss in 2025, this time to Footscray, Foot was awarded with Southport's Doc Mackenzie Medal, given to the best and fairest player of the Sharks' season. He also won the Most Dedicated Player award.
