= Campbell Lake (footballer) =

Australian rules footballer (born 2004)

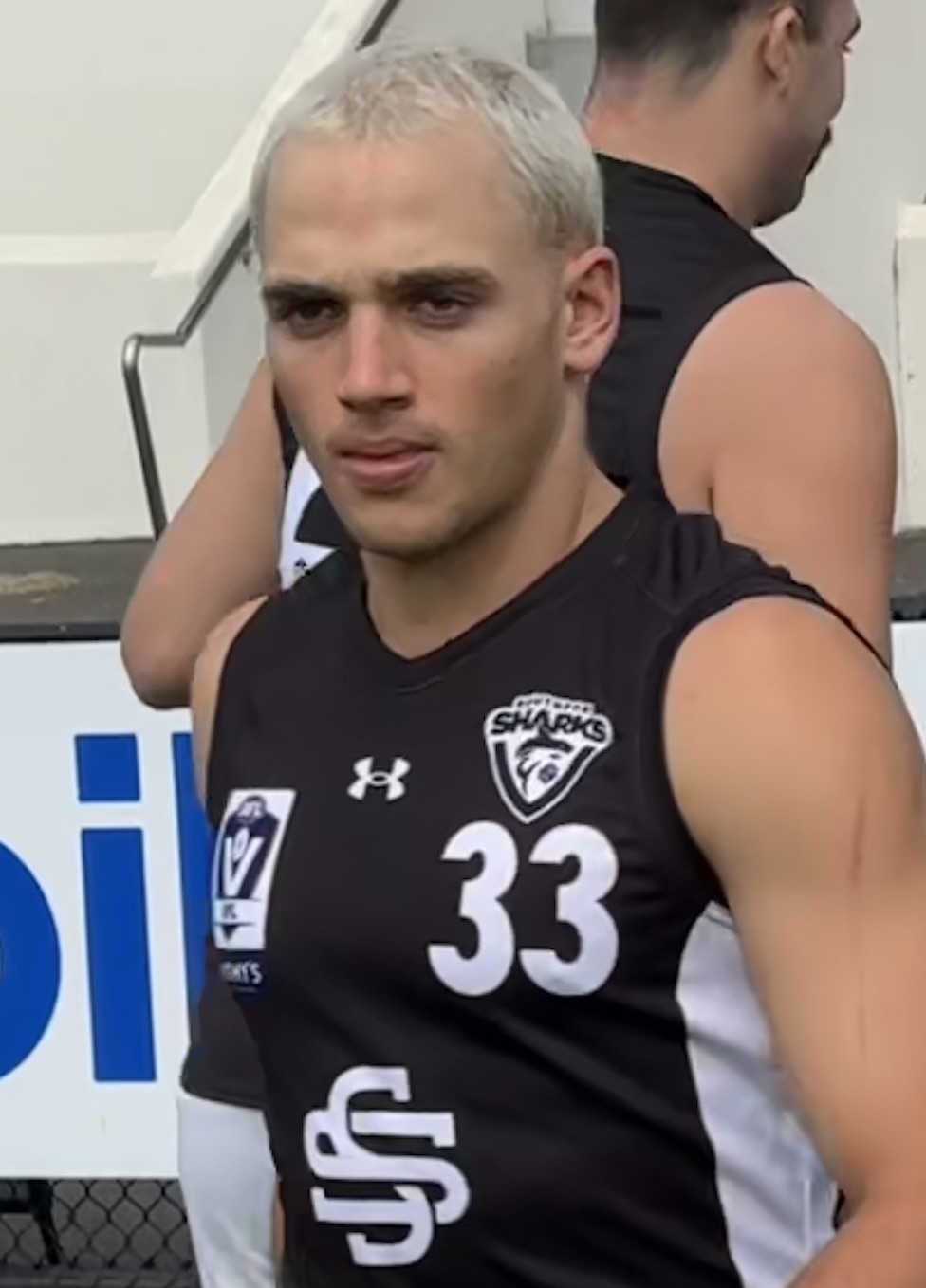
- Lake playing for Southport in 2026

Personal information
- Born: 11 August 2004 (age 22)
- Original teams: Gold Coast Suns Academy (Talent League); Southport (VFL); Labrador (QAFL); Ormeau (QFA)
- Draft: No. 7, 2026 mid-season rookie draft
- Debut: Round 13, 2026, St Kilda vs. Sydney, at the SCG
- Height: 175 cm (5 ft 9 in)
- Position: Forward

Club information
- Current club: St Kilda
- Number: 39

Playing career^{1}
Years	Club	Games (Goals)
2026–	St Kilda	8 (5)
- ^{1} Playing statistics correct to the end of round 22, 2026.

Career highlights
- VFL premiership player: 2023

Campbell Lake (born 11 August 2004) is a professional Australian rules footballer playing for St Kilda in the Australian Football League (AFL).

== Pre-AFL career ==
Lake grew up on the Gold Coast where he attended Ormeau Woods State High School and played junior football for the Ormeau Bulldogs, Labrador Tigers and Southport Sharks. He was part of the Gold Coast Suns Academy, playing in the Talent League. He was overlooked in his draft year in 2022, returning to the Suns in the Talent League for 2023. Lake also played for the Suns in the VFL in 2023, including in their victorious 2023 VFL Grand Final.

Lake joined Southport in the VFL in 2024. He was part of Southport's losing Grand Final sides in 2024 and 2025.

== AFL career ==
Lake was selected by St Kilda with pick 7 of the 2026 mid-season rookie draft. He was selected to make his debut in round 13 of the 2026 AFL season.

== Senior State/Community League Statistics ==
Year	Team	League	Games	Goals	Best Player
2022	Gold Coast Suns Academy	NAB League	3	2	1
2022	Labrador	QAFL	7	4	1
2023	Gold Coast Suns Academy	NAB League	4	2	1
2023	Labrador	QAFL	9	2	3
2023	Gold Coast Reserves	VFL	8	4	0
2024	Southport	VFL	22	14	4
2025	Southport	VFL	21	10	3
2026	Southport	VFL	8	12	4
2026	St Kilda Reserves	VFL	1	2	0

As of 8 June 2026

== Statistics ==
Updated to the end of round 22, 2026.

Legend
G	Goals	K	Kicks	D	Disposals	T	Tackles
B	Behinds	H	Handballs	M	Marks

Season	Team	No.	Games	Totals							Averages (per game)							Votes
Season	Team	No.	Games	G	B	K	H	D	M	T	G	B	K	H	D	M	T	Votes
2026	St Kilda	39	8	5	0	26	61	87	15	32	0.6	0.0	3.3	7.6	10.9	1.9	4.0	0
Career			8	5	0	26	61	87	15	32	0.6	0.0	3.3	7.6	10.9	1.9	4.0	0
