= Oskar Baker =

Australian rules footballer

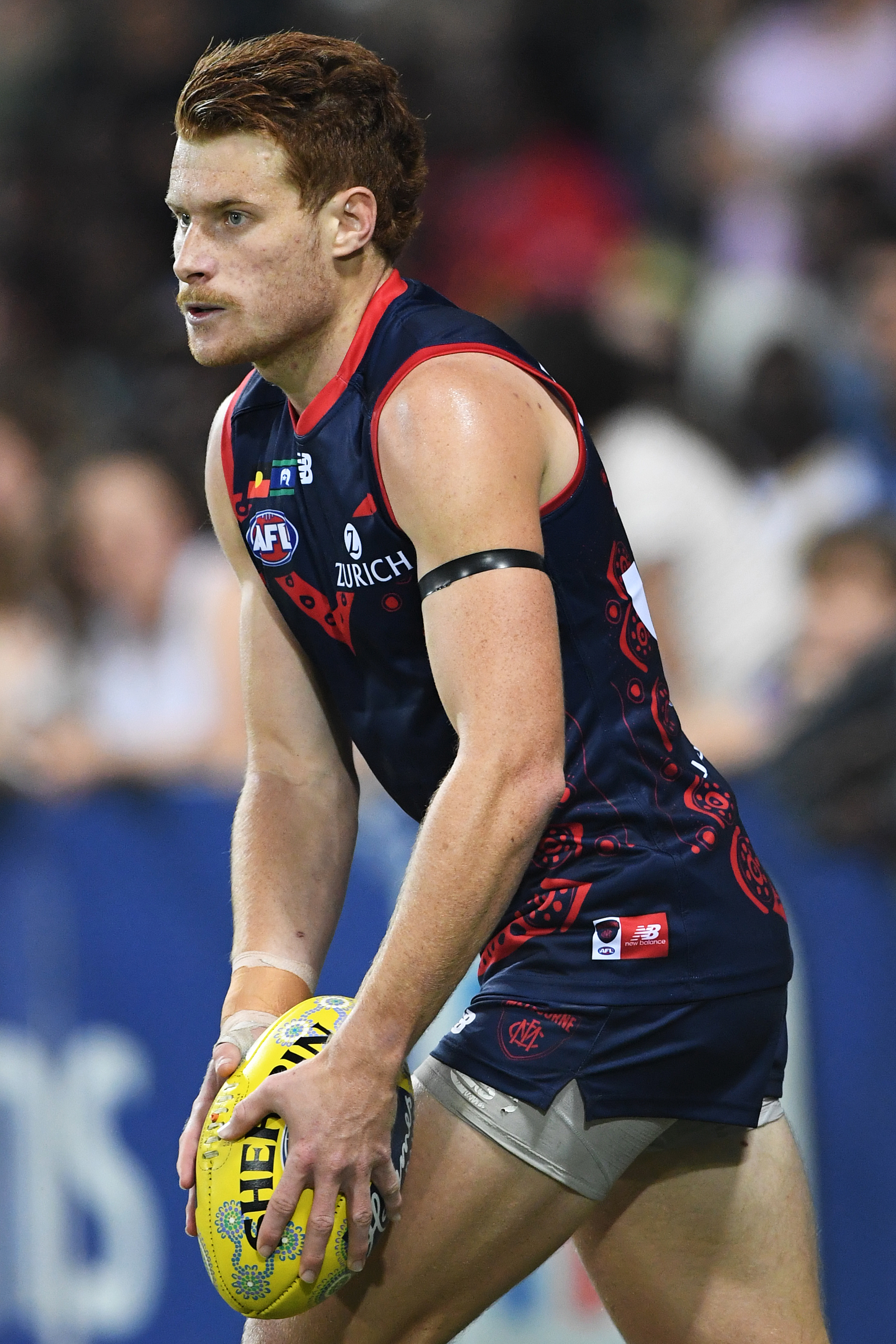
- Baker playing for Melbourne in June 2019

Personal information
- Born: 25 May 1998 (age 28); Queensland
- Original team: Aspley (NEAFL)
- Draft: No. 48, 2017 national draft
- Debut: Round 9, 2019, Melbourne vs. West Coast, at Perth Stadium
- Height: 184 cm (6 ft 0 in)
- Weight: 82 kg (181 lb)
- Position: Midfielder

Club information
- Current club: Western Bulldogs
- Number: 13

Playing career^{1}
| Years | Club | Games (Goals) |
| 2018–2022 | Melbourne | 15 (4) |
| 2023–2026 | Western Bulldogs | 42 (19) |
| Total | | 57 (23) |
- ^{1} Playing statistics correct to the end of the 2026 season.

Career highlights
- 2× VFL premiership player: 2022, 2025

Oskar Baker (born 25 May 1998) is a professional Australian rules footballer who most recently played for the Western Bulldogs in the Australian Football League (AFL). He previously played for Melbourne.

== Early life ==
Baker was born in Queensland and attended Padua College in Brisbane. He played for Wilston Grange and Aspley in the North East Australian Football League.

== AFL career ==
=== Melbourne (2017–2022) ===
Selected by Melbourne with pick 48 in the 2017 national draft, Baker made his debut in the loss to West Coast at Perth Stadium in round nine of the 2019 season.

Unable to cement his spot in the senior side, Baker was delisted after 15 games over 5 seasons.

=== Western Bulldogs (2023–2026) ===
Following his delisting at the end of the 2022 AFL season, Baker was selected by the Western Bulldogs in the pre-season supplemental selection period.

Baker made his debut for the Bulldogs in a Round 1 clash against Melbourne of the 2023 AFL Season. Despite his team losing, he was influential with 13 disposals, a goal, three marks and 319 meters gained.

On 11 July 2023, Baker signed a two-year extension with the Bulldogs, tying him to the club until the end of 2025. Baker kicked a career-high three goals against the Gold Coast Suns, also registering 19 disposals and nine marks as the medical sub in round two of the 2024 season. Baker often found himself in and out of the AFL side across the 2024 and 2025 seasons, registering six and nine games respectively. Additionally, he was a part of Footscray's 2025 VFL Premiership team. On Grand Final day he delivered an impactful 14 disposals, 7 tackles and a goal in the 10-point victory over the Southport Sharks. At the conclusion of the 2025 season, Baker signed a one-year extension to ensure he would remain with he Western Bulldogs through the end of the 2026 season.

In 2026, Baker was named in the Western Bulldogs' opening round AFL side against the reigning premiers, the Brisbane Lions. In the early stages of the season, Baker was able to cement his spot in the AFL team. In Round 3 against the Adelaide Crows, Baker proved to be the man of the hour with an impactful 3 goals from 8 disposals. Notably opening the scoring with the first goal of the match as well as a match-winning goal of the year nominee to secure the Bulldogs a 3–0 start to the 2026 AFL season. At the end of the 2026 season, the Bulldogs announced that they would not be offering Baker a contract extension

== Personal life ==
In 2017, Baker's mother died from breast cancer. In all of his AFL games, Baker has worn a black armband and taped wrists to remind him of her.

== Statistics ==
Updated to the end of the 2026 season.

Legend
| G | Goals | K | Kicks | D | Disposals | T | Tackles |
| B | Behinds | H | Handballs | M | Marks |

| Season | Team | No. | Games | Totals | | | | | | | Averages (per game) | | | | | | | Votes |
| Season | Team | No. | Games | G | B | K | H | D | M | T | G | B | K | H | D | M | T | Votes |
|---|---|---|---|---|---|---|---|---|---|---|---|---|---|---|---|---|---|---|
| 2019 | Melbourne | 33 | 9 | 2 | 4 | 79 | 45 | 124 | 40 | 15 | 0.2 | 0.4 | 8.8 | 5.0 | 13.8 | 4.4 | 1.7 | 0 |
| 2020 (Note: The 2020 season was played with 17 home-and-away matches per team (down from 22) and 16-minute quarters with time on (down from 20-minute quarters with time on) due to the impact of the COVID-19 pandemic.) | Melbourne | 33 | 3 | 2 | 0 | 30 | 11 | 41 | 8 | 5 | 0.7 | 0.0 | 10.0 | 3.7 | 13.7 | 2.7 | 1.7 | 0 |
| 2021 (Note: Statistics include two games in which Baker was an unused medical substitute (rounds 2 and 12).) | Melbourne | 33 | 3 | 0 | 0 | 12 | 3 | 15 | 5 | 4 | 0.0 | 0.0 | 4.0 | 1.0 | 5.0 | 1.7 | 1.3 | 0 |
| 2022 | Melbourne | 33 | 0 | — | — | — | — | — | — | — | — | — | — | — | — | — | — | 0 |
| 2023 | Western Bulldogs | 13 | 18 | 6 | 9 | 191 | 73 | 264 | 86 | 22 | 0.3 | 0.5 | 10.6 | 4.1 | 14.7 | 4.8 | 1.2 | 0 |
| 2024 | Western Bulldogs | 13 | 6 | 3 | 1 | 51 | 34 | 85 | 33 | 4 | 0.5 | 0.2 | 8.5 | 5.7 | 14.2 | 5.5 | 0.7 | 0 |
| 2025 | Western Bulldogs | 13 | 9 | 1 | 1 | 80 | 58 | 138 | 38 | 14 | 0.1 | 0.1 | 8.9 | 6.4 | 15.3 | 4.2 | 1.6 | 0 |
| 2026 | Western Bulldogs | 13 | 9 | 9 | 2 | 67 | 45 | 112 | 44 | 8 | 1.0 | 0.2 | 7.4 | 5.0 | 12.4 | 4.9 | 0.9 | 0 |
| Career | | | 57 | 23 | 17 | 510 | 269 | 779 | 254 | 72 | 0.4 | 0.3 | 8.9 | 4.7 | 13.7 | 4.5 | 1.3 | 0 |
