= Ryan Gardner (footballer) =

Australian rules footballer (born 1997)

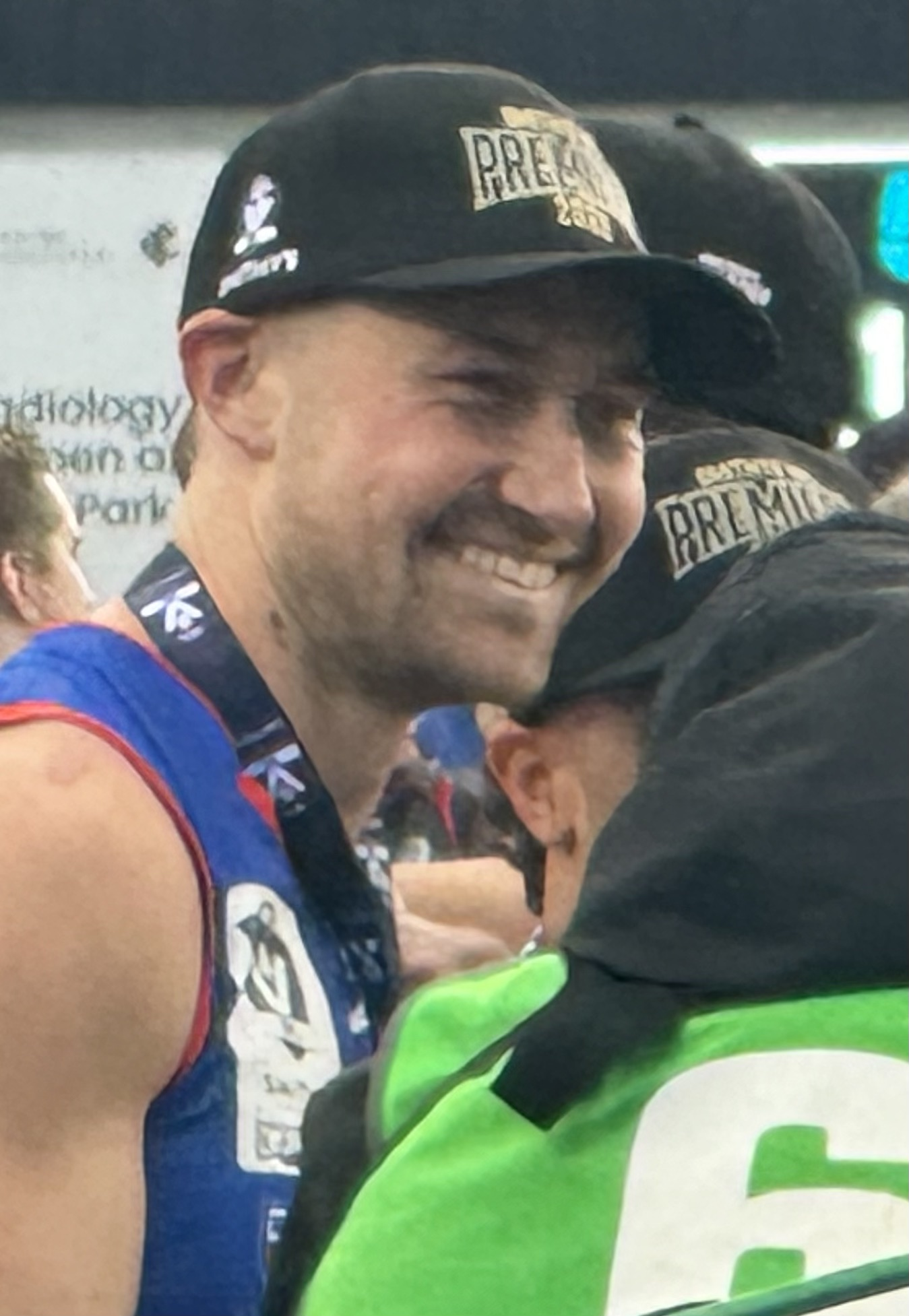
- Gardner in 2025

Personal information
- Born: 1 June 1997 (age 29); Smithton, Tasmania
- Original team: Burnie Dockers Football Club Redpa Football Club
- Draft: No. 59, 2015 AFL draft, Geelong
- Debut: 2 June 2019, Western Bulldogs vs. West Coast, at Perth Stadium
- Height: 197 cm (6 ft 6 in)
- Weight: 93 kg (205 lb)
- Position: Forward/Defender/Ruck

Club information
- Current club: Western Bulldogs
- Number: 43

Playing career
Years	Club	Games (Goals)
2015–2018	Geelong	0 (0)
2019–2026	Western Bulldogs	58 (4)
Total		58 (4)

Career highlights
- VFL premiership player: 2025

Ryan Gardner (born 1 June 1997) is a former professional Australian rules footballer who played for the Western Bulldogs in the Australian Football League (AFL).

Gardner was initially drafted by Geelong at pick 59 in the 2015 AFL draft, but was delisted at the end of the 2018 season without having played a senior game. However, Gardner was recruited by the Western Bulldogs in the 2019 mid-season rookie draft and made his debut on 2 June 2019.

Before being drafted by Geelong, Gardner played for the Burnie Dockers Football Club.

Gardner injured his AC joint in his shoulder in the opening minutes of Round 3, keeping him out of the team for an estimated 10 weeks.

Gardner was delisted by the Western Bulldogs at the end of the 2026 season.

== Honours & Achievements ==
- Individual
  - Brad Johnson Best Team Player – Western Bulldogs: 2022

== Statistics ==
Updated to the end of round 22, 2026.

Legend
G	Goals	K	Kicks	D	Disposals	T	Tackles
B	Behinds	H	Handballs	M	Marks

Season	Team	No.	Games	Totals							Averages (per game)							Votes
Season	Team	No.	Games	G	B	K	H	D	M	T	G	B	K	H	D	M	T	Votes
2019	Western Bulldogs	43	2	2	1	4	8	12	2	1	1.0	0.5	2.0	4.0	6.0	1.0	0.5	0
2020 (Note: The 2020 season was played with 17 home-and-away matches per team (down from 22) and 16-minute quarters with time on (down from 20-minute quarters with time on) due to the impact of the COVID-19 pandemic.)	Western Bulldogs	43	10	0	0	41	35	76	27	14	0.0	0.0	4.1	3.5	7.6	2.7	1.4	0
2021	Western Bulldogs	43	9	0	0	37	18	55	20	5	0.0	0.0	4.1	2.0	6.1	2.2	0.6	0
2022	Western Bulldogs	43	22	0	0	164	78	242	116	25	0.0	0.0	7.5	3.5	11.0	5.3	1.1	0
2023	Western Bulldogs	43	10	1	0	61	28	89	36	15	0.1	0.0	6.1	2.8	8.9	3.6	1.5	0
2024	Western Bulldogs	43	0	—	—	—	—	—	—	—	—	—	—	—	—	—	—	0
2025	Western Bulldogs	43	1	0	0	4	1	5	1	2	0.0	0.0	4.0	1.0	5.0	1.0	2.0	0
2026	Western Bulldogs	43	1	0	0	4	1	5	0	0	0.0	0.0	4.0	1.0	5.0	0.0	0.0	0
Career			55	3	1	315	169	484	202	62	0.1	0.0	5.7	3.1	8.8	3.7	1.1	0
