= Liam McMahon (footballer) =

Australian rules footballer (born 2002)

- McMahon in September 2026

Personal information
- Full name: Liam McMahon
- Born: 2 May 2002 (age 24)
- Original teams: Northern Knights (NAB League); Eltham (NFNL)
- Draft: No. 31, 2020 AFL draft No. 18, 2025 mid-season rookie draft
- Height: 198 cm (6 ft 6 in)
- Weight: 92 kg (203 lb)

Club information
- Current club: Essendon
- Number: 48

Playing career^{1}
Years	Club	Games (Goals)
2021–2022	Collingwood	0 (0)
2025–2026	Essendon	7 (12)
- ^{1} Playing statistics correct to the end of the 2026 season.

Liam McMahon (born 2 May 2002) is an Australian rules footballer who last played for the Essendon Football Club in the Australian Football League (AFL). He was previously on Collingwood's list after being selected with pick 31 in the 2020 AFL draft, but was delisted at the end of the 2022 season without playing a senior game.

== Career ==
McMahon played for Greensborough and Eltham as a junior footballer in the Northern Football League (NFL, later NFNL). He joined the Northern Knights in the NAB League in 2019, while also appearing for Vic Metro in under-17s matches.

Although the 2020 Victorian football season was cancelled due to the COVID-19 pandemic, McMahon was drafted by Collingwood at the end of the year with pick 31 in the 2020 AFL draft. He kicked seven goals from his first seven Victorian Football League (VFL) games in the curtailed 2021 season. After playing in all possible 19 VFL games in 2022, he was delisted by Collingwood, having not played an AFL game.

Following his AFL delisting, McMahon joined Montmorency in the NFNL and Carlton in the VFL.

In 2025, McMahon was selected with the final selection in the 2025 mid-season rookie draft. He made his AFL debut for Essendon in round 19 of the 2025 season against Greater Western Sydney.

In September 2025, McMahon signed a one-year contract extension to the end of 2026.

After failing to feature at AFL level for Essendon in 2026, McMahon was delisted come the end of the season.

== Statistics ==
Updated to the end of the 2026 season.

Legend
G	Goals	K	Kicks	D	Disposals	T	Tackles
B	Behinds	H	Handballs	M	Marks

Season	Team	No.	Games	Totals							Averages (per game)							Votes
Season	Team	No.	Games	G	B	K	H	D	M	T	G	B	K	H	D	M	T	Votes
2021	Collingwood	29	0	—	—	—	—	—	—	—	—	—	—	—	—	—	—	0
2022	Collingwood	29	0	—	—	—	—	—	—	—	—	—	—	—	—	—	—	0
2025	Essendon	48	7	12	3	32	14	46	16	1	1.7	0.4	4.6	2.0	6.6	2.3	0.1	0
2026	Essendon	48	0	—	—	—	—	—	—	—	—	—	—	—	—	—	—	0
Career			7	12	3	32	14	46	16	1	1.7	0.4	4.6	2.0	6.6	2.3	0.1	0
