= 2019 Carlton Football Club season =

Carlton Football Club
2019 season
- President: Mark LoGiudice
- Coach: Brendon Bolton (Rds 1–11); David Teague (Rds 12-23)
- Captain: Patrick Cripps; Sam Docherty
- Home grounds: Melbourne Cricket Ground (Training and administrative: Ikon Park)
- AFL season: 16th
- AFL Women's: 2nd
- Leading goalkicker: Harry McKay (26)
- Club membership: 64,269

The 2019 Carlton Football Club season was the Carlton Football Club's 156th season of competition.

It was the club's men's team's 123rd season as a member of the Australian Football League. After a 1–10 start to the 2019 AFL season, fourth-year senior coach Brendon Bolton was sacked and replaced by David Teague – first as caretaker coach, but later as permanent senior coach. Improved performances in the second half of the season saw the team finish sixteenth out of eighteen teams with a 7–15 record.

It was the club's women's team's third season as a member of the AFL Women's competition. The team finished second out of ten teams in the 2019 AFL Women's season, qualifying for the 2019 AFL Women's Grand Final which it lost against Adelaide by 45 points.

The club also fielded a team in the VFL Women's competition.

== Club summary ==
The 2019 AFL season is the 123rd season of the VFL/AFL competition since its inception in 1897; and, having competed in every season, it is also the 123rd season contested by the Carlton Football Club. Carlton continued its alignment with the Northern Blues in the Victorian Football League, allowing Carlton-listed players to play with the Northern Blues when not selected in AFL matches. Carlton's primary home ground continued to be the Melbourne Cricket Ground, with many games also played at Marvel Stadium (renamed from Etihad Stadium in 2018); traditional home ground Ikon Park continued to serve as the training and administrative base. The club fielded its women's team in the third season of the AFL Women's competition, running in February and March, and Ikon Park served as the home ground for AFL Women's matches.

Car manufacturer Hyundai, which had been a major sponsor of the club continuously since 2008, and airline Virgin Australia, which had upgraded from a secondary sponsor to a major sponsor during the 2017 season, continued as the club's two major sponsors, under deals in place until 2022.

The club again achieved a record membership in 2019, signing a total of 64,269 members through the season. This was the club's second consecutive huge increase in membership numbers, having increased from 50,130 to a then-record 56,005 members in 2018. This translated also to a significant increase in home attendances for the club's matches on previous years.

== Senior Personnel ==
Mark LoGiudice continued as club president, a role he has held since June 2014.

Brendon Bolton commenced the year as the club's senior coach for his fourth season in the role. However, after the team's 1–10 start to the season, punctuated by a heavy round 11 loss to Essendon, Bolton was dismissed, bringing an end to his Carlton coaching career after 77 games and a win–loss record of 16–61. The club paid out the balance of the protected period in Bolton's open-ended contract to the end of the 2020 season. David Teague, who has been the forwards assistant coach since 2018 and who had previously coached the club's VFL-affiliate Northern Bullants from 2008 to 2010, was appointed caretaker coach for the rest of the season; then, with two games remaining in the season, Teague was appointed senior coach on a permanent basis on a three-year contract.

Other than the change of senior coach at midseason, the club's coaching staff was relatively unchanged, with former North Melbourne and Geelong ruckman Hamish McIntosh joining the club as specialist coach for rucks.

Marc Murphy stepped down as club captain after six seasons in the role. In his place, joint vice-captains Patrick Cripps and Sam Docherty were named joint captains, the first time in club history that joint captains had been named – although Docherty ultimately missed the entire season for the second year in a row after suffering an anterior cruciate ligament injury in the preseason. With no formal vice captains appointed, Murphy, Kade Simpson and Ed Curnow formed the rest of a leadership group which was reduced in size from 2018.

== Squad for 2019 ==
The following is Carlton's squad for the 2019 season.

Statistics are correct as of end of 2018 season. Flags represent the state of origin, i.e. the state in which the player played his Under-18s football.

Senior List
No.	State	Player	Age	AFL Debut	Recruited from	Career (to end 2018)		2019 Player Statistics
No.	State	Player	Age	AFL Debut	Recruited from	Gms	Gls	Gms	Gls	B	D	K	HB	M	T	HO
1	(Victoria (state))	Jack Silvagni	21	2016	Oakleigh (U18)	43	32	17	13	11	235	146	89	73	62	0
2	(Victoria (state))	Paddy Dow	19	2018	Bendigo (U18)	20	7	19	7	10	271	138	133	40	50	0
3	(Victoria (state))	Marc Murphy (lg)	31	2006	Oakleigh (U18)	249	173	19	12	3	483	279	204	88	65	0
4	(Victoria (state))	Lochie O'Brien	19	2018	Bendigo (U18)	18	2	17	7	4	211	159	52	80	19	0
5	(Western Australia)	Sam Petrevski-Seton	20	2017	Claremont	42	15	22	4	4	420	245	175	87	96	0
6	(Victoria (state))	Kade Simpson (lg)	34	2003	Eastern (U18)	317	135	18	3	0	366	265	101	85	46	0
7	(New South Wales)	Matthew Kennedy	21	2016	Collingullie-Glenfield Park, GWS	31	10	10	11	5	107	62	45	27	16	0
8	(Victoria (state))	Matthew Kreuzer	29	2008	Northern (U18)	173	89	15	5	5	196	127	69	30	34	467
9	(Western Australia)	Patrick Cripps (c)	23	2014	East Fremantle	81	34	20	13	6	560	212	348	62	123	0
10	(Victoria (state))	Harry McKay	21	2017	Gippsland (U18)	15	24	20	26	30	207	161	46	125	32	20
11	(Western Australia)	Mitch McGovern	24	2016	Claremont, Adelaide	48	67	16	22	11	136	96	40	60	24	0
12	(Victoria (state))	Tom de Koning	19	2018	Dandenong (U18)	2	1	–	–	–	–	–	–	–	–	–
13	(Victoria (state))	Liam Stocker	18	2019	Sandringham (U18)	–	–	5	0	0	68	42	26	12	9	0
14	(Tasmania)	Liam Jones	27	2010	North Hobart, Western Bulldogs	112	84	13	0	0	116	87	29	62	29	0
15	(Victoria (state))	Sam Docherty (c)	25	2013	Gippsland (U18), Brisbane Lions	92	14	–	–	–	–	–	–	–	–	–
16	(Victoria (state))	Darcy Lang	23	2014	Geelong (U18), Geelong	55	37	8	5	5	63	44	19	24	24	0
18	(Victoria (state))	Sam Walsh	18	2019	Geelong (U18)	–	–	22	6	13	554	297	257	113	69	0
19	(Victoria (state))	Angus Schumacher	19	2019	Bendigo (U18)	–	–	1	0	0	13	10	3	4	0	0
20	(Victoria (state))	Lachie Plowman	24	2013	Calder (U18), GWS	73	1	21	0	0	305	220	85	96	48	0
21	(Western Australia)	Jarrod Garlett	22	2015	South Fremantle, Gold Coast	28	15	2	0	0	22	15	7	5	7	0
22	(Victoria (state))	Caleb Marchbank	22	2015	Murray (U18), GWS	35	0	13	0	0	172	119	53	65	27	0
23	(Victoria (state))	Jacob Weitering	21	2016	Dandenong (U18)	56	10	20	0	0	264	199	65	115	29	0
24	(Victoria (state))	Nic Newman	25	2017	Frankston, Sydney	34	12	20	6	2	428	328	100	135	66	0
25	(Western Australia)	Zac Fisher	20	2017	Perth	34	12	21	9	7	368	190	178	49	58	0
26	(New South Wales)	Harrison Macreadie	20	2017	Henty	8	0	1	0	0	2	2	0	0	1	0
27	(Victoria (state))	Matthew Lobbe	29	2010	Eastern (U18), Port Adelaide	98	22	2	0	0	14	8	6	2	9	55
28	(Victoria (state))	David Cuningham	21	2016	Oakleigh (U18)	16	7	9	7	5	144	65	79	28	32	0
29	(Victoria (state))	Cameron Polson	20	2017	Sandringham (U18)	13	3	3	1	1	21	11	10	0	5	0
30	(Victoria (state))	Charlie Curnow	21	2016	Geelong (U18)	47	59	11	18	8	135	115	20	49	17	0
31	(Victoria (state))	Tom Williamson	21	2017	North Ballarat (U18)	15	1	2	0	0	23	12	11	6	3	0
32	(Western Australia)	Alex Fasolo	26	2011	East Fremantle, Collingwood	101	133	3	2	0	20	11	9	6	8	0
33	(Western Australia)	Jarrod Pickett	22	2017	South Fremantle, GWS	17	8	–	–	–	–	–	–	–	–	–
34	(Tasmania)	Andrew Phillips	27	2012	Lauderdale, GWS	36	14	5	1	4	57	33	24	18	17	147
35	(Victoria (state))	Ed Curnow (lg)	29	2011	Geelong (U18), Adelaide, Box Hill	143	27	22	9	8	496	267	229	84	112	0
36	(Victoria (state))	Pat Kerr	20	2018	Oakleigh (U18)	4	2	–	–	–	–	–	–	–	–	–
37	(Victoria (state))	Ben Silvagni	18	–	Oakleigh (U18)	–	–	–	–	–	–	–	–	–	–	–
38	(Victoria (state))	Finbar O'Dwyer	18	–	Murray (18)	–	–	–	–	–	–	–	–	–	–	–
39	(Victoria (state))	Dale Thomas	31	2006	Gippsland (U18), Collingwood	238	152	20	3	3	386	270	116	105	61	0
41	(Victoria (state))	Levi Casboult	28	2012	Dandenong (U18)	104	117	20	15	11	223	159	64	114	44	164
43	(New South Wales)	Will Setterfield	20	2017	Sandringham (U18), GWS	2	0	18	6	12	297	183	114	58	56	0
Rookie List
No.	State	Player	Age	AFL Debut	Recruited from	Career (to end 2018)		2019 Player Statistics
No.	State	Player	Age	AFL Debut	Recruited from	Gms	Gls	Gms	Gls	B	D	K	HB	M	T	HO
40	(Victoria (state))	Tomas Bugg	25	2012	Gippsland (U18), GWS, Melbourne	96	34	–	–	–	–	–	–	–	–	–
40	(Victoria (state))	Michael Gibbons	23	2019	Williamstown	–	–	21	16	14	308	196	112	69	57	0
42	(South Australia)	Kym LeBois	19	–	North Adelaide	–	–	–	–	–	–	–	–	–	–	–
44	(Victoria (state))	Matthew Owies	21	–	St Kevin's, Seattle Redhawks	–	–	–	–	–	–	–	–	–	–	–
45	(Victoria (state))	Hugh Goddard	22	2015	Geelong (U18), St Kilda	10	1	2	0	0	12	8	4	3	3	0
46	(Victoria (state))	Matthew Cottrell	18	–	Dandenong (U18)	–	–	–	–	–	–	–	–	–	–	–
47	(Western Australia)	Josh Deluca	23	2017	Subiaco, Fremantle	4	2	6	4	1	71	31	40	13	23	0
Senior coaching panel
	State	Coach	Coaching position				Carlton Coaching debut		Former clubs as coach
	(Tasmania)	Brendon Bolton	Senior Coach (Rds 1–11)				2016		North Hobart (s), Tasmania (VFL) (s), Clarence (s), Box Hill (s), Hawthorn (a)
	(Victoria (state))	David Teague	Assistant coach (Forwards); Caretaker senior coach (Rds 12-23)				2008		Carlton (d), Northern Bullants (s), West Coast (a), St Kilda (a), Adelaide (a)
	(Victoria (state))	John Barker	Assistant coach (stoppages)				2011		St Kilda (a), Hawthorn (a)
	(Victoria (state))	Cameron Bruce	Assistant coach (midfield)				2018		Hawthorn (a)
	(Victoria (state))	Dale Amos	Assistant coach (defence)				2016		South Barwon (s), Geelong (a), Geelong reserves (s)
	(Victoria (state))	Shane Watson	Development coach (Defenders)				2016		Lower Plenty (s), Sandringham (U18) (a), Eastern (U18) (s), North Melbourne (a)
	(Victoria (state))	Josh Fraser	Development coach (Stoppages), Northern Blues senior coach				2016		Gold Coast reserves (s)
	(Victoria (state))	Jason Davenport	Development coach (Forwards)				2018		North Shore (s)
	(Victoria (state))	Brent Stanton	Development coach (Midfield)				2018
	(Victoria (state))	Saverio Rocca	Specialist coach (goalkicking)				2017
	(New South Wales)	Hamish McIntosh	Specialist coach (ruck)				2019

- For players: (c) denotes captain, (vc) denotes vice-captain, (dvc) denotes deputy vice-captain, (lg) denotes leadership group.
- For coaches: (s) denotes senior coach, (cs) denotes caretaker senior coach, (a) denotes assistant coach, (d) denotes development coach, (m) denotes managerial or administrative role in a football or coaching department

== Playing list changes ==
The following summarises all player changes which occurred after the 2018 season. Unless otherwise noted, draft picks refer to selections in the 2018 National Draft.

The most notable feature of the club's recruiting was the bold live draft pick trade it made with Adelaide in the National Draft. Carlton was keen to draft Liam Stocker, the 2018 Morrish Medallist whom it rated as the sixth-best draft prospect; and when he was yet to be selected in the later stages of the first round, Carlton set about arranging a trade, offering to swap 2019 first round selections with higher-ranking clubs in exchange for a low 2018 selection. After seeing Xavier Duursma selected by Port Adelaide with the No. 18 selection, Adelaide, who had wanted to recruit Duursma, agreed to the live trade. It was the first live trade in AFL Draft history after rule changes for this season allowed the practice.

For the early part of the season, the bold decision looked likely to backfire badly, and as late as Round 13, Adelaide was sitting in the top four while Carlton was on the bottom of the ladder, opening the possibility that it would lose the 2019 No. 1 selection in the deal. However, Carlton's stronger end-of-season form saw it rise to 16th, and Adelaide lost seven of its last nine games to fall to 11th; and when the teams entered the 2019 National Draft, Carlton had effectively traded pick No. 4 for pick No. 9 and Stocker. Carlton ultimately traded pick 9 as well, turning the 2019 No. 4 pick into three late first round selections: Stocker (No. 19, 2018), Brodie Kemp (No. 17, 2019) and Sam Philp (No. 20, 2019).

=== In ===
Player	Former Club	League	via
(Western Australia) Alex Fasolo	Collingwood	AFL	Unrestricted free agency signing; Collingwood received a third round compensation draft pick
(Western Australia) Mitch McGovern	Adelaide	AFL	AFL trade period. In a three-way trade among Carlton, Adelaide and Sydney, Carlton received McGovern and Adelaide's third-round draft selection in the 2019 draft; and sent one of the club's priority mature age player pre-listing concessions and its fifth-round selection in the 2019 National Draft to Adelaide; and two second-round draft selections (provisionally No. 24 and 26) to Sydney.
(New South Wales) Will Setterfield	Greater Western Sydney	AFL	AFL trade period, received along with a fourth-round draft selection (provisionally No. 71), in exchange for a third round draft selection (provisionally No. 43) and Carlton's second-round draft pick in the 2019 National Draft.
(Victoria (state)) Matthew Owies	Seattle University	NCAA	Category B rookie selection, (basketball).
(Victoria (state)) Nic Newman	Sydney	AFL	AFL trade period, in exchange for Carlton's fourth-round draft pick in the 2019 National Draft.
(Victoria (state)) Sam Walsh	Geelong (U18)	TAC Cup	AFL National Draft, first round selection (No. 1 overall)
(Victoria (state)) Liam Stocker	Sandringham (U18)	TAC Cup	AFL National Draft, first round selection (No. 19 overall)
(Victoria (state)) Finbar O'Dwyer	Murray (U18)	TAC Cup	AFL National Draft, fourth round selection (No. 66 overall)
(Victoria (state)) Ben Silvagni	Oakleigh (U18)	TAC Cup	AFL National Draft, fifth round selection (No. 70 overall). (Father–son rule eligible, but not bid on by other clubs)
(Victoria (state)) Hugh Goddard	St Kilda	AFL	AFL Rookie Draft, first round selection (No. 1 overall).
(Victoria (state)) Tomas Bugg	Melbourne	AFL	AFL Rookie Draft, second round selection (No. 19 overall).
(Victoria (state)) Michael Gibbons	Williamstown	VFL	Pre-season supplemental selection period.
(Victoria (state)) Matt Cottrell	Dandenong (U18)	VFL	Pre-season supplemental selection period.
(Western Australia) Josh Deluca	Subiaco	WAFL	AFL Midseason Draft, first round selection (No. 1 overall).

=== Out ===
Player	New Club	League	via
(Victoria (state)) Alex Silvagni			Retired after the 2018 season.
(Victoria (state)) Cam O'Shea	University Blues	VAFA	Delisted after the 2018 season.
(Victoria (state)) Aaron Mullett	Mooroolbark	EFL	Delisted after the 2018 season.
(Victoria (state)) Matt Shaw	Southport	NEAFL	Delisted from the rookie list after the 2018 season.
(Western Australia) Jesse Glass-McCasker	Swan Districts	WAFL	Delisted from the rookie list after the 2018 season.
(South Australia) Matthew Wright	Adelaide reserves	SANFL	Retired after the 2018 season.
(Republic of Ireland) Ciarán Byrne	Louth GAA	GAA	Retired after the 2018 season.
(Republic of Ireland) Cillian McDaid	Galway GAA	GAA	Retired after the 2018 season.
(New South Wales) Sam Rowe	St Kilda	AFL	Delisted after the trade period.
(Victoria (state)) Jed Lamb	Bentleigh	SFNL	Delisted after the trade period.
(Victoria (state)) Sam Kerridge	White Hills	Heathcote District FNL	Delisted after the trade period.
(Victoria (state)) Nick Graham	Darley	Ballarat FL	Delisted after the trade period.
(Victoria (state)) Tomas Bugg			Retired in February 2019.
(Western Australia) Jarrod Pickett			Retired in June 2019.

=== List management ===
Player	Change
Priority draft pick	After requesting a priority draft pick after the 2018 season, Carlton was granted priority access to pre-list up to two mature aged players from state league clubs.
AFL Trade Period	Received a third round draft pick (provisionally No. 42) from Geelong in exchange for one of the club's priority mature age player pre-listing concessions.
2018 National Draft live trading	Gained a first round draft selection (No. 19) from Adelaide in exchange for the two clubs swapping first-round selections in the 2019 National Draft.
2018 National Draft live trading	Traded a fourth-round selection (No. 64) to Adelaide in exchange for a lower fourth-round selection (No. 67) and Adelaide's fifth-round selection in the 2019 AFL Draft; then on-traded the No. 67 selection to St Kilda in exchange for a fifth-round selection (No. 75) and St Kilda's fourth-round selection in the 2019 National Draft.

== Season summary ==
=== Pre-season ===
The club played two full-length practice matches as part of the JLT Community Series.

**Date and local time**	**Opponent**	**Scores** (Carlton's scores indicated in **bold**)			**Venue**	**Attendance**
**Date and local time**	**Opponent**	Home	Away	Result	**Venue**	**Attendance**
Thursday, 28 February (6:40 pm)	Essendon	**15.10 (100)**	14.7 (91)	Won by 9 points	Ikon Park (H)	8,215
Monday, 11 March (2:10 pm)	Collingwood	11.11 (77)	**10.13 (73)**	Lost by 4 points	Morwell Recreation Reserve (A)	6,386

=== Home and away season ===
**Rd**	**Date and local time**	**Opponent**	**Scores** (Carlton's scores indicated in **bold**)			**Venue**	**Attendance**	**Ladder** **position**
**Rd**	**Date and local time**	**Opponent**	Home	Away	Result	**Venue**	**Attendance**	**Ladder** **position**
1	Thursday, 21 March (7:20 pm)	Richmond	**9.10 (64)**	14.13 (97)	Lost by 33 points	Melbourne Cricket Ground (H)	85,016	14th
2	Saturday, 30 March (4:10 pm)	Port Adelaide	11.6 (72)	**13.10 (88)**	Lost by 16 points	Adelaide Oval (A)	41,552	15th
3	Saturday, 6 April (1:45 pm)	Sydney	**10.14 (74)**	14.9 (93)	Lost by 19 points	Marvel Stadium (H)	39,290	16th
4	Sunday, 14 April (2:40 pm)	Gold Coast	8.11 (59)	**8.9 (57)**	Lost by 2 points	Metricon Stadium (A)	14,176	18th
5	Sunday, 21 April (1:10 pm)	Western Bulldogs	7.15 (57)	**15.11 (101)**	Won by 44 points	Marvel Stadium (A)	35,069	15th
6	Sunday, 28 April (3:20 pm)	Hawthorn	13.15 (93)	**13.10 (88)**	Lost by 5 points	University of Tasmania Stadium (A)	15,888	15th
7	Sunday, 5 May (1:10 pm)	North Melbourne	**8.14 (62)**	18.12 (120)	Lost by 58 points	Marvel Stadium (H)	42,430	17th
8	Saturday, 11 May (1:45 pm)	Collingwood	**13.9 (87)**	16.10 (106)	Lost by 19 points	Melbourne Cricket Ground (H)	69,289	18th
9	Sunday, 19 May (4:40 pm)	GWS	20.18 (138)	**7.3 (45)**	Lost by 93 points	GIANTS Stadium (A)	9,599	18th
10	Sunday, 26 May (3:20 pm)	St Kilda	9.14 (68)	**8.7 (55)**	Lost by 13 points	Marvel Stadium (A)	35,058	18th
11	Sunday, 2 June (3:20 pm)	Essendon	11.8 (74)	**4.9 (33)**	Lost by 41 points	Melbourne Cricket Ground (A)	50,423	18th
12	Saturday, 8 June (1:45 pm)	Brisbane Lions	**11.12 (78)**	9.9 (63)	Won by 15 points	Marvel Stadium (H)	32,211	18th
13	Saturday, 15 June (7:25 pm)	Western Bulldogs	**15.10 (100)**	15.13 (103)	Lost by 3 points	Marvel Stadium (H)	35,479	18th
14	Bye							18th
15	Sunday, 30 June (3:20 pm)	Fremantle	11.9 (75)	**11.13 (79)**	Won by 4 points	Optus Stadium (A)	37,293	17th
16	Sunday, 7 July (1:10 pm)	Melbourne	**15.10 (100)**	15.15 (105)	Lost by 5 points	Melbourne Cricket Ground (H)	55,593	17th
17	Saturday, 13 July (1:45 pm)	Sydney	8.14 (62)	**9.15 (69)**	Won by 7 points	Sydney Cricket Ground (A)	32,570	17th
18	Saturday, 20 July (2:10 pm)	Gold Coast	**15.9 (99)**	11.9 (75)	Won by 24 points	Marvel Stadium (H)	31,765	16th
19	Saturday, 27 July (2:10 pm)	Adelaide	**13.9 (87)**	9.6 (60)	Won by 27 points	Melbourne Cricket Ground (H)	38,369	16th
20	Sunday, 4 August (3:20 pm)	West Coast	**11.9 (75)**	15.9 (99)	Lost by 24 points	Marvel Stadium (H)	32,802	16th
21	Sunday, 11 August (3:20 pm)	Richmond	11.7 (73)	**6.9 (45)**	Lost by 28 points	Melbourne Cricket Ground (A)	51,039	16th
22	Saturday, 17 August (1:45 pm)	St Kilda	**11.12 (78)**	10.8 (68)	Won by 10 points	Melbourne Cricket Ground (H)	51,786	16th
23	Saturday, 24 August (4:35 pm)	Geelong	19.15 (129)	**8.13 (61)**	Lost by 68 points	GMHBA Stadium (A)	31,669	16th

== Awards, records and events ==
Game records

- Round 5 – Carlton's score of 15.11 (101) against Western Bulldogs was its first score exceeding 100 points since Round 12, 2016, ending a streak of 59 consecutive games failing to score 100 points. It is the second-longest such streak in the club's history, exceeded only by a streak between 1897 and 1904 when scores above 100 were highly uncommon.
- Round 12 – Carlton's home win against Brisbane Lions was its first since Round 8, 2018, ending a club record streak of 11 consecutive home losses.

Player records

- Round 5 – Patrick Cripps recorded 32 handpasses against Western Bulldogs, the most ever by a Carlton player in a single game, breaking Greg Williams' 1994 record of 28.
- Round 19 – Patrick Cripps recorded 19 clearances against Adelaide, breaking his own record for most clearances ever by a Carlton player in a game, and the most by any player in the league since 2011.

== Individual awards ==
=== John Nicholls Medal ===
The Carlton Football Club Best and Fairest awards night took place on 4 October. The John Nicholls Medal, for the best and fairest player of the club, as well as several other awards, were presented on the night.

John Nicholls Medal

The winner of the John Nicholls Medal was Patrick Cripps, who polled 143 votes. It was Cripps' third John Nicholls Medal, having won the medal previously in 2015 and 2018, and at 24 he became the youngest player ever to win the award three times (surpassing John Nicholls, who won his third at 26). Cripps won a close count ahead of Ed Curnow, who finished second with 138 votes, and Lachie Plowman, who finished third with 134 votes; it was the highest medal placing for both players.

Pos.	Player	Votes
1st	Patrick Cripps	143
2nd	Ed Curnow	138
3rd	Lachie Plowman	134
4th	Sam Walsh	125
5th	Levi Casboult	116
6th	Jacob Weitering	110
7th	Liam Jones	95
8th	Marc Murphy	88
9th	Kade Simpson	87
10th	Sam Petrevski-Seton	68

Other awards

The following other awards were presented on John Nicholls Medal night:-

- Best First-Year Player – Sam Walsh
- Best Clubman – Ed Curnow
- Spirit of Carlton Award – Jacob Weitering
- Bill Lanyon Inner Blue Ruthless Award – Patrick Cripps
- Carltonians William A. Cook Award – Patrick Cripps
- Coaches' Award – Levi Casboult

=== AFL Rising Star ===
Sam Walsh was the winner of the 2019 NAB AFL Rising Star award, making him the first Carlton player to win the award in the men's competition in its 27-year history. Walsh was nominated for the award in Round 4, and quickly became a strong favourite to win. He went on to poll 54 out of a possible 55 votes in the final count, meaning ten of the eleven judges placed him first and one placed him second. He won by 12 votes from second place getter Connor Rozee (Port Adelaide). The strength of his performances and his ability to have an impact in games in only his first season was widely noted, and in the process he broke the record for most disposals in a season by a first year player.

=== Leading goalkickers ===
Harry McKay was Carlton's leading goalkicker for the season with 26 goals. It was McKay's first time as Carlton's leading goalkicker. 2018 leading goalkicker Charlie Curnow finished third despite playing only eleven games due to injury.

Player	Goals	Behinds
Harry McKay	26	30
Mitch McGovern	22	11
Charlie Curnow	18	8
Michael Gibbons	16	14
Levi Casboult	15	11

=== Other ===
Honorific teams

- Patrick Cripps was named in the centreline of the 2019 All-Australian team. It was Cripps' second consecutive time selected in the team. He was the only Carlton player in the team, or in the original 40-man squad.
- Three Carlton players were named in the 22under22 team for the 2019 season: Harry McKay, Sam Walsh and Jacob Weitering. Two other players, Zac Fisher and Sam Petrevski-Seton, were named in the original squad of 40, giving Carlton an equal league-high five nominees in the squad.

AFLPA Awards

For each of the AFLPA awards, one or three Carlton players were nominated by an internal vote of Carlton players; Patrick Cripps and Sam Docherty were also nominated for the Best Captain award by default (despite Docherty not having played a game due to injury).

Carlton had its strongest showing in the AFLPA awards in history, winning two and placing in third. Patrick Cripps won the Leigh Matthews Trophy as AFLPA Most Valuable Player for the first time in his career, finishing 313 votes ahead of Geelong's Tim Kelly; he also placed second in the Best Captain award with 128 votes, behind only West Coast's Shannon Hurn who polled 171. Sam Walsh was a runaway winner of the Best First Year Player award, polling more than three times as many votes as runner up Connor Rozee (Port Adelaide).

Leigh Matthews Trophy (Most Valuable Player)

- Patrick Cripps (winner, 832 votes)
- Jacob Weitering (nominated)
- Sam Walsh (nominated)

Robert Rose Award (Most Courageous Player)

- Liam Jones (nominated)

Best First Year Player

- Sam Walsh (winner, 400 votes)

Best Captain

- Patrick Cripps (second place, 128 votes)
- Sam Docherty (nominated by default)

Australian Football Hall of Fame

- Carlton had two former personnel inducted into the Australian Football Hall of Fame during 2019:
  - Player Ken Hunter, who played 147 games and won three premierships with Carlton in the 1980s, in addition to playing 99 WAFL games at Claremont
  - Coach Mick Malthouse, the AFL's coaching games record holder who coached Carlton from 2013 until mid-2015, in addition to longer (and more successful) coaching stints at Footscray, West Coast and Collingwood.

== Women's teams ==
=== AFL Women's ===
Squad

After having finished last in the 2018 AFLW season, the club replaced inaugural coach Damien Keeping with former Carlton and Northern Bullants player Daniel Harford, who had been coached at Balwyn and St Kevins over the previous decade. Key recruitments to the Carlton AFLW squad were Amelia Mullane, traded from Collingwood, and Maddy Prespakis and Abbie McKay in the draft – the latter being the daughter of club champion and administrator Andrew McKay. Brianna Davey remained captain of the club for the second consecutive season; Katie Loynes was vice-captain.

The club's 2019 squad is given below. The number of games played and goals scored in the 2019 season is given in parentheses.

Carlton Football Club (AFL Women's)
Senior list		Coaching staff
1 Brianna Davey (c) (9,2); 2 Katie Loynes (vc) (9,2); 3 Darcy Vescio (9,5); 4 Maddy Prespakis (9,7); 5 Abbie McKay (4,0); 6 Gab Pound (9,1); 7 Tayla Harris (8,8); 7 Amelia Mullane (9,0); 9 Kerryn Harrington (9,0); 10 Sarah Hosking (9,1); 11 Jess Hosking (9,0); 12 Lauren Brazzale (8,0); 13 Kirby Bentley (3,0); 14 Brooke Walker (7,6)	15 Chloe Dalton (9,5); 16 Breann Moody (8,2); 18 Courtney Webb; 18 Tilly Lucas-Rodd (5,2); 19 Georgia Gee (8,1); 20 Charlotte Wilson (5,0); 21 Nicola Stevens (9,0); 22 Rhiannon Watt (2,0); 25 Jess Edwards (7,1); 26 Shae Audley (2,0); 27 Emerson Woods (1,0); 30 Alison Downie (9,2); 32 Natalie Plane (4,2); 36 Jayde Van Dyk (9,0)	**Head coach**: Daniel Harford; **Assistant coaches**: Steven Salopek (backline); Shannon McFerran (midfield); Brad Fisher (forwards); Adam Dancey (development); Legend: (c) Captain(s); (vc) Vice-captain(s); Updated: {{{date}}} Source(s): Senior list, Coaching staff

Season summary

The AFL Women's competition expanded from eight clubs to ten in 2019; and to accommodate this within the seven week season, the clubs were split into two conferences of five teams each. Carlton, after losing its first two matches against Conference A opponents, finished the season with four wins from its last five, losing only in a close game to Conference B rival Geelong. This saw Carlton finish atop the ladder within Conference B, and saw the team qualify for the finals for the first time.

This conclusion to the season was not without controversy, as Carlton qualified with a record of 4–3 and a percentage of 99.6%, which was a poorer numerical record than both the Kangaroos and Melbourne who missed the finals from Conference A.

**Rd**	**Date and local time**	**Opponent**	**Scores** (Carlton's scores indicated in **bold**)			**Venue**	**Attendance**
**Rd**	**Date and local time**	**Opponent**	Home	Away	Result	**Venue**	**Attendance**
1	Sunday, 3 February (1:05 pm)	Kangaroos	7.10 (52)	**2.4 (16)**	Lost by 36 points	North Hobart Oval (A)	4,896
2	Sunday, 10 February (4:05 pm)	Adelaide	**7.2 (44)**	9.3 (57)	Lost by 13 points	Ikon Park (H)	3,150
3	Saturday, 16 February (4:45 pm)	GWS	5.6 (36)	**10.5 (65)**	Won by 29 points	Blacktown ISP Oval (A)	3,823
4	Saturday, 23 February (4:45 pm)	Geelong	2.7 (19)	**1.8 (14)**	Lost by 5 points	GMHBA Stadium (A)	7,060
5	Saturday, 2 March (7:15 pm)	Collingwood	**4.10 (34)**	4.5 (29)	Won by 5 points	Ikon Park (H)	3,215
6	Sunday, 10 March (4:05 pm)	Brisbane	**6.7 (43)**	4.3 (27)	Won by 16 points	Ikon Park (H)	2,900
7	Sunday, 17 March (4:05 pm)	Western Bulldogs	5.8 (38)	**6.5 (41)**	Won by 3 points	VU Whitten Oval (A)	9,609

Conference B
Pos	Team	Pld	W	L	D	PF	PA	PP	Pts	Qualification
**1**	Carlton	**7**	**4**	**3**	**0**	**257**	**258**	**99.6**	**16**	**Preliminary finals**
2	Geelong	7	3	4	0	154	235	65.5	**12**	**Preliminary finals**
3	Greater Western Sydney	7	2	5	0	208	295	70.5	**8**	
4	Brisbane	7	2	5	0	193	274	70.4	**8**	
5	Collingwood	7	1	6	0	162	243	66.7	**4**	

Source: womens.afl
Rules for classification: 1) points; 2) percentage; 3) number of points for.

Finals

Finishing first in Conference B, Carlton qualified for the preliminary finals, hosting Fremantle, who had finished second in Conference A. Carlton dominated the preliminary final throughout, gaining a strong lead with a four-goals-to-none second quarter and maintaining that advantage to victory.

This set up a Grand Final against Adelaide. After an even first quarter which saw Adelaide hold a nine-point quarter time lead, Adelaide proceeded to dominate the second quarter with six goals to Carlton's one, which opened a 40-point half time lead which effectively killed the contest. Only one goal was kicked after half time as Adelaide finished with a 45-point win.

**Rd**	**Date and local time**	**Opponent**	**Scores** (Carlton's scores indicated in **bold**)			**Venue**	**Attendance**
**Rd**	**Date and local time**	**Opponent**	Home	Away	Result	**Venue**	**Attendance**
Preliminary final	Saturday, 23 March (2:45 pm)	Fremantle	**9.10 (64)**	4.4 (28)	Won by 36 points	Ikon Park (H)	7,146
Grand Final	Sunday, 31 March(12:30 pm)	Adelaide	10.3 (63)	**2.6 (18)**	Lost by 45 points	Adelaide Oval (A)	53,034

Notable events

- In Round 3 against GWS, Carlton scored its highest AFLW score ever, 10.5 (65).
- In Round 3 against GWS, Carlton won its first match since Round 2, 2018, ending a 7-game losing streak.
- A picture taken by AFL Media photographer Michael Willson of Tayla Harris kicking for goal in Round 7 became the target of sexual internet trolling after it was posted on social media by Seven Network. Harris re-tweeted the photograph with the caption: "Here's a pic of me at work... think about this before your derogatory comments, animals," in what became an iconic symbol calling for changes in attitudes towards women's sportspeople. Seven initially removed the photo, before reinstating it with an apology for yielding to the trolls instead of moderating them. Willson later won the inaugural Women in Sport Photo Action Awards for the image.
- Carlton's preliminary final winning margin of 36 points against Fremantle was Carlton's greatest winning margin in AFLW history.
- The attendance of 53,034 at the Grand Final was, at the time, a record for any stand-alone women's sporting event in Australian history. This was surpassed in March 2020 by the 2020 ICC Women's T20 World Cup Final; but, as of 2020, remains the highest crowd for a women's Australian football match.

Awards

The following individual awards and honours were won by Carlton players:

- Brianna Davey and Maddy Prespakis were joint winners of the Carlton Best and Fairest Award.
- Brianna Davey, Maddy Prespakis and Kerryn Harrington were all named in the 2019 AFL Women's All-Australian team. Gab Pound was also included in the original squad of 40.
- Maddy Prespakis won the AFL Women's Rising Star award, marking Carlton's first ever Rising Star award winner in the club's men's or women's team histories. Prespakis polled 49 votes out of a maximum possible 50 for the award.
- Maddy Prespakis won the AFLW Players Association Best First Year Player Award.
- Brianna Davey won the AFLW Players Association Best Captain Award.
- Mark of the Year was won by Tayla Harris.

=== VFL Women's ===
Carlton's VFL Women's team contested the VFL Women's competition for the second time, finishing twelfth out of thirteen teams with a win–loss record of 3–10–1.

== Northern Blues ==
The Carlton Football Club had a full affiliation with the Northern Blues during the 2019 season. It was the seventeenth (and ultimately, the last) season of the clubs' affiliation, which had been in place since 2003. Carlton senior- and rookie-listed players who were not selected to play in the Carlton team were eligible to play for the Northern Blues senior team in the Victorian Football League. The club's home matches were split between the VFL club's traditional home ground Preston City Oval, and Carlton's traditional home ground Ikon Park. The club finished tenth out of fifteen on the final ladder with a win–loss record of 7–11, missing the finals. Carlton-listed player Hugh Goddard won the Laurie Hill Trophy as Northern Blues' best and fairest.
