= 2018 Carlton Football Club season =

Carlton Football Club
2018 season
- President: Mark LoGiudice
- Coach: Brendon Bolton
- Home grounds: Melbourne Cricket Ground (Training and administrative: Ikon Park)
- AFL season: 18th
- AFL Women's: 8th

The 2018 Carlton Football Club season was the Carlton Football Club's 155th season of competition.

It was the club's men's team's 122nd season as a member of the Australian Football League. The team finished last out of eighteen teams in the 2018 AFL season, with the club's worst ever win–loss record of 2–20.

It was the club's women's team's second season as a member of the AFL Women's competition. The team also finished last, out of eight teams, in the 2018 AFL Women's season with a 2–5 record.

The club fielded a team in the VFL Women's competition.

== Club summary ==
The 2018 AFL season was the 122nd season of the VFL/AFL competition since its inception in 1897; and, having competed in every season, it was also the 122nd season contested by the Carlton Football Club. Carlton continued its alignment with the Northern Blues in the Victorian Football League, allowing Carlton-listed players to play with the Northern Blues when not selected in AFL matches. Carlton's primary home ground continued to be the Melbourne Cricket Ground; traditional home ground Ikon Park continued to serve as the training and administrative base. The club fielded its women's team in the second season of the AFL Women's competition, running in February and March; Ikon Park served as the home ground for AFL Women's matches. The club also fielded its VFL women's team in the VFL Women's competition for the first time, splitting home games between RAMS Arena, Craigieburn and Ikon Park.

Car manufacturer Hyundai, which had been a major sponsor of the club continuously since 2008, and airline Virgin Australia, which had upgraded from a secondary sponsor to a major sponsor during the 2017 season, continued as the club's two major sponsors, each signing a five-year extension to their existing deals. In August, the club launched the Carlton College of Sports, a higher education institution in partnership with La Trobe University; it received its first intake of students in 2019 to study sports education diplomas, with much of the program operated out of the redeveloped grandstands at Ikon Park.

== Senior Personnel ==
Mark LoGiudice continued as club president, a role he had held since June 2014. CEO Steven Trigg resigned shortly after the 2017 season, and he was replaced by Richmond Chief Customer Officer Cain Liddle.

Brendon Bolton continued as club coach for his third season in the role. Originally, it was the final season of Bolton's open-ended contract in which he was guaranteed a full payout if sacked; but over the off-season, the club and Bolton renegotiated to extend this period until the end of 2020. The club's coaching staff underwent some changes and expansions before the 2018 season. Director of Coaching Neil Craig retired from the football industry at the end of 2017 after more than four decades as a player and coach; John Barker took over as the club's head of strategy. Former player and development coach David Teague, who had been most recently serving as forward-line coach at Adelaide, returned to Carlton as an assistant coach, and former Melbourne player Cameron Bruce, who had most recently served as defensive coach at Hawthorn and had worked there with Brendan Bolton, joined Carlton as defensive coach. Recently retired Essendon midfielder Brent Stanton and Geelong Football League coach Jason Davenport both joined the club as development coaches.

Marc Murphy retained his position as club captain for the sixth season. Kade Simpson stepped down as vice-captain after nine years in the role, but remained in the leadership group. Patrick Cripps and Sam Docherty named joint vice captains in his place – Docherty's nomination coming despite having already suffered a season-ending knee injury prior to the announcement. The rest of the extended leadership group comprised Ed Curnow, who held his place in the group from 2017, and Matthew Kreuzer, Lachie Plowman and (despite being on the rookie list) Alex Silvagni, who were all newly elevated, replacing Dennis Armfield and Bryce Gibbs, who both left the club at the end of 2017.

== Squad for 2018 ==
The following is Carlton's squad for the 2018 season.

Flags represent the state of origin, i.e. the state in which the player played his Under-18s football.

Senior List
No.	State	Player	Age	AFL Debut	Recruited from	Career (to end 2017)		2018 Player Statistics
No.	State	Player	Age	AFL Debut	Recruited from	Gms	Gls	Gms	Gls	B	D	K	HB	M	T	HO
1	(Victoria (state))	Jack Silvagni	20	2016	Oakleigh (U18)	28	26	15	6	4	161	93	68	45	42	0
2	(Victoria (state))	Paddy Dow	18	2018	Bendigo (U18)	–	–	20	7	7	284	136	148	40	64	0
3	(Victoria (state))	Marc Murphy (c)	30	2006	Oakleigh (U18)	236	168	13	5	4	338	184	154	62	52	0
4	(Victoria (state))	Lochie O'Brien	18	2018	Bendigo (U18)	–	–	18	2	1	251	168	83	79	26	0
5	(Western Australia)	Sam Petrevski-Seton	19	2017	Claremont	20	10	22	5	8	354	206	148	79	95	0
6	(Victoria (state))	Kade Simpson (lg)	33	2003	Eastern (U18)	286	131	21	4	0	549	369	180	115	42	0
7	(New South Wales)	Matthew Kennedy	20	2016	Collingullie-Glenfield Park, GWS	19	7	12	3	3	206	83	123	40	40	0
8	(Victoria (state))	Matthew Kreuzer (lg)	28	2008	Northern (U18)	161	84	12	5	5	159	99	60	24	41	276
9	(Western Australia)	Patrick Cripps (vc)	22	2014	East Fremantle	59	23	22	11	15	652	259	393	92	138	0
10	(Victoria (state))	Harry McKay	20	2017	Gippsland (U18)	2	3	13	21	11	138	103	35	70	23	24
11	(Victoria (state))	Sam Kerridge	24	2012	Bendigo (U18), Adelaide	59	31	10	4	3	211	117	94	60	31	0
12	(Victoria (state))	Tom de Koning	18	2018	Dandenong (U18)	–	–	2	1	0	16	6	10	6	4	3
13	(Victoria (state))	Jed Lamb	25	2013	Gippsland (U18), Sydney, GWS	48	36	18	7	3	262	179	83	53	39	0
14	(Tasmania)	Liam Jones	26	2010	North Hobart, Western Bulldogs	95	84	17	0	1	180	124	56	92	39	9
15	(Victoria (state))	Sam Docherty (vc)	24	2013	Gippsland (U18), Brisbane Lions	92	14	–	–	–	–	–	–	–	–	–
16	(Victoria (state))	Darcy Lang	22	2014	Geelong (U18), Geelong	44	31	11	6	2	152	94	58	44	40	0
17	(New South Wales)	Sam Rowe	30	2013	Murray (U18), Sydney, Norwood	82	16	17	1	0	157	92	65	52	28	23
18	(Victoria (state))	Aaron Mullett	25	2011	Eastern (U18), North Melbourne	85	31	13	2	4	195	143	52	56	24	0
19	(Victoria (state))	Angus Schumacher	18	–	Bendigo (U18)	–	–	–	–	–	–	–	–	–	–	–
20	(Victoria (state))	Lachie Plowman (lg)	23	2013	Calder (U18), GWS	60	1	13	0	0	155	98	57	57	17	0
21	(Western Australia)	Jarrod Garlett	21	2015	South Fremantle, Gold Coast	17	10	11	5	7	123	80	43	35	36	0
22	(Victoria (state))	Caleb Marchbank	21	2015	Murray (U18), GWS	23	0	12	0	1	160	100	60	53	24	0
23	(Victoria (state))	Jacob Weitering	20	2016	Dandenong (U18)	42	9	14	1	0	189	127	62	82	22	0
24	(Victoria (state))	Cam O'Shea	25	2011	Eastern (U18), Port Adelaide, Northern Blues	81	7	11	0	0	129	85	44	40	33	2
25	(Western Australia)	Zac Fisher	19	2017	Perth	17	4	17	8	6	326	170	156	29	59	0
26	(New South Wales)	Harrison Macreadie	19	2017	Henty	8	0	–	–	–	–	–	–	–	–	–
27	(Victoria (state))	Matthew Lobbe	28	2010	Eastern (U18), Port Adelaide	92	21	6	1	1	59	32	27	14	29	212
28	(Victoria (state))	David Cuningham	20	2016	Oakleigh (U18)	11	6	5	1	0	61	24	37	12	8	0
29	(Victoria (state))	Cameron Polson	19	2017	Sandringham (U18)	1	0	12	3	5	91	50	41	7	39	0
30	(Victoria (state))	Charlie Curnow	20	2016	Geelong (U18)	27	25	20	34	20	277	206	71	123	42	2
31	(Victoria (state))	Tom Williamson	19	2017	North Ballarat (U18)	15	1	–	–	–	–	–	–	–	–	–
32	(Victoria (state))	Nicholas Graham	23	2013	Gippsland (U18)	38	10	10	1	5	167	88	79	37	29	0
33	(Western Australia)	Jarrod Pickett	21	2017	South Fremantle, GWS	10	6	7	2	1	58	40	18	13	20	0
34	(Tasmania)	Andrew Phillips	26	2012	Lauderdale, GWS	31	11	5	3	0	34	22	12	9	10	139
35	(Victoria (state))	Ed Curnow (lg)	28	2011	Geelong (U18), Adelaide, Box Hill	122	22	21	5	6	534	266	268	81	138	0
36	(Victoria (state))	Pat Kerr	19	–	Oakleigh (U18)	–	–	4	2	5	37	28	9	17	3	6
38	(Republic of Ireland)	Ciarán Byrne	23	2015	Louth GAA	15	0	7	0	1	116	67	49	26	20	0
39	(Victoria (state))	Dale Thomas	30	2006	Gippsland (U18), Collingwood	218	149	20	3	1	446	270	179	139	39	0
41	(Victoria (state))	Levi Casboult	27	2012	Dandenong (U18)	94	105	10	12	10	86	61	25	37	12	76
46	(South Australia)	Matthew Wright	28	2011	North Adelaide, Adelaide	138	115	21	21	12	283	179	104	81	46	0
Rookie List
No.	State	Player	Age	AFL Debut	Recruited from	Career (to end 2017)		2018 Player Statistics
No.	State	Player	Age	AFL Debut	Recruited from	Gms	Gls	Gms	Gls	B	D	K	HB	M	T	HO
37	(Victoria (state))	Matt Shaw	25	2011	Dandenong (U18), Gold Coast	102	33	2	0	0	36	16	20	9	0	0
40	(Western Australia)	Jesse Glass-McCasker	20	–	Swan Districts	–	–	–	–	–	–	–	–	–	–	–
42	(South Australia)	Kym LeBois	19	–	North Adelaide	–	–	–	–	–	–	–	–	–	–	–
44	(Victoria (state))	Alex Silvagni (lg)	30	2010	Casey, Fremantle	60	10	–	–	–	–	–	–	–	–	–
45	(Republic of Ireland)	Cillian McDaid	20	–	Galway GAA	–	–	–	–	–	–	–	–	–	–	–
Senior coaching panel
	State	Coach	Coaching position				Carlton Coaching debut		Former clubs as coach
	(Tasmania)	Brendon Bolton	Senior Coach				2016		North Hobart (s), Tasmania (VFL) (s), Clarence (s), Box Hill (s), Hawthorn (a)
	(Victoria (state))	John Barker	Head of Strategy & High Performance Manager				2011		St Kilda (a), Hawthorn (a)
	(Victoria (state))	Cameron Bruce	Assistant coach (Defenders)				2018		Hawthorn (a)
	(Victoria (state))	Tim Clarke	Assistant coach (Midfield)				2016		Richmond (a), Coburg (s), Richmond reserves (s)
	(Victoria (state))	Dale Amos	Assistant coach (Stoppages)				2016		South Barwon (s), Geelong (a), Geelong reserves (s)
	(Victoria (state))	David Teague	Assistant coach (Forwards)				2008		Carlton (d), Northern Bullants (s), West Coast (a), St Kilda (a), Adelaide (a)
	(Victoria (state))	Shane Watson	Head of Development (Defenders)				2016		Lower Plenty (s), Sandringham (U18) (a), Eastern (U18) (s), North Melbourne (a)
	(Victoria (state))	Josh Fraser	Development coach (Stoppages), Northern Blues senior coach				2016		Gold Coast reserves (s)
	(Victoria (state))	Jason Davenport	Development coach (Forwards)				2018		North Shore (s)
	(Victoria (state))	Brent Stanton	Development coach (Midfield)				2018

- For players: (c) denotes captain, (vc) denotes vice-captain, (lg) denotes leadership group.
- For coaches: (s) denotes senior coach, (cs) denotes caretaker senior coach, (a) denotes assistant coach, (d) denotes development coach, (m) denotes managerial or administrative role in a football or coaching department

== Playing list changes ==
The following summarises all player changes which occurred after the 2017 season. Unless otherwise noted, draft picks refer to selections in the 2017 AFL draft.

As in the 2016/17 offseason, Bryce Gibbs was linked to Adelaide during the trade period. Originally South Australian, Gibbs was three years into a five-year contract, but sought a return to Adelaide for family reasons, nominating the Adelaide Crows as his preferred destination. No deal had been reached during the 2016/17 offseason, but successful negotiations in this offseason saw Gibbs traded to Adelaide for draft picks. Carlton made three recruits during the trade period, and entered the 2017 draft with two selections in the top ten.

=== In ===
Player	Former Club	League	via
(Victoria (state)) Matthew Lobbe	Port Adelaide	AFL	AFL Trade Period, in exchange for a sixth-round draft pick (provisionally No. 95) and part of Lobbe's salary continuing to be paid by Port Adelaide.
(New South Wales) Matthew Kennedy	Greater Western Sydney	AFL	AFL Trade Period, in exchange for a second-round draft pick (provisionally No. 28)
(Victoria (state)) Darcy Lang	Geelong	AFL	AFL Trade Period, along with Carlton's fourth-round draft pick in the 2018 National Draft, in exchange for a fourth-round draft pick (provisionally No. 58) and Geelong's fourth-round draft pick in the 2018 National Draft.
(Victoria (state)) Aaron Mullett	North Melbourne	AFL	Signed as a delisted free agent prior to the national draft.
(Republic of Ireland) Cillian McDaid	GAA	Galway GAA	Signed as a Category B International Rookie prior to the national draft.
(Victoria (state)) Paddy Dow	TAC Cup	Bendigo	AFL National Draft, first round selection (No. 3 overall).
(Victoria (state)) Lochie O'Brien	TAC Cup	Bendigo	AFL National Draft, first round selection (No. 10 overall).
(Victoria (state)) Tom de Koning	TAC Cup	Dandenong	AFL National Draft, second round selection (No. 30 overall).
(Victoria (state)) Angus Schumacher	TAC Cup	Bendigo	AFL National Draft, fourth round selection (No. 70 overall).
(Western Australia) Jarrod Garlett	WAFL	South Fremantle	AFL National Draft, fifth round selection (No. 78 overall).
(Victoria (state)) Cam O'Shea	VFL	Northern Blues	Taken with the only selection in the AFL Pre-season Draft (No. 1 overall).
(Victoria (state)) Matt Shaw	AFL	Gold Coast	AFL Rookie Draft, first round selection (No. 3 overall).

=== Out ===
Player	New Club	League	via
(Western Australia) Dennis Armfield	Avondale Heights	EDFL	Retired
(South Australia) Daniel Gorringe	Balwyn	Eastern FL	Retired
(United States) Matt Korcheck			Retired from the Category B rookie list
(Victoria (state)) Kristian Jaksch	Old Carey Grammarians	VAFA	Delisted prior to the trade period
(Victoria (state)) Liam Sumner	St Bedes/Mentone	VAFA	Delisted prior to the trade period
(Victoria (state)) Andrew Gallucci	Collingwood reserves	VFL	Delisted from the rookie list prior to the trade period
(South Australia) Bryce Gibbs	Adelaide	AFL	AFL Trade Period, along with the club's fifth-round draft pick (provisionally No. 77) and its second- and third-round draft picks in the 2018 National Draft, in exchange for two first-round draft picks (provisionally No. 10 and 16), a fourth-round draft pick (provisionally No. 73) and Adelaide's second-round draft pick in the 2018 National Draft.
(Victoria (state)) Dylan Buckley	GWS	AFL	Delisted following the trade period, then drafted by GWS in the 2018 rookie draft.
(Republic of Ireland) Ciaran Sheehan	Avondale Heights	EDFL	Delisted from the rookie list following the trade period
(Victoria (state)) Rhys Palmer	Swan Districts	WAFL	Retired from the AFL following the trade period
(Western Australia) Blaine Boekhorst	East Fremantle	WAFL	Delisted following the trade period
(Victoria (state)) Billie Smedts	Leopold	Geelong FL	Delisted following the trade period
(Western Australia) Simon White	Doncaster East	Eastern FL	Delisted following the trade period

=== List management ===
Player	Change
National draft	Carlton traded its third-round draft pick (provisionally No. 40) and Adelaide's first-round pick (provisionally No. 16, which was obtained in the trade for Bryce Gibbs) to Western Bulldogs in exchange for two second-round draft picks (provisionally No. 28 and 30) and Western Bulldogs's second-round draft pick in the 2018 National Draft.
(Western Australia) Blaine Boekhorst (Victoria (state)) Matt Shaw (Victoria (state)) Cam O'Shea	All three players received permission to train with the Carlton squad in the lead-up to the rookie draft.

== Season summary ==
=== AFLX ===
Carlton participated in the inaugural pre-season AFLX competition. The club competed in Pool B at Etihad Stadium on Friday 16 February, playing its round-robin matches against Melbourne and North Melbourne. The club took a young team into the tournament, including several players new to the club in 2018, and Caleb Marchbank served as captain. Carlton lost both of its round robin games and failed to progress to the final.

**Date and local time**	**Opponent**	**Scores** (Carlton's scores indicated in **bold**)			**Venue**	**Attendance**
**Date and local time**	**Opponent**	Carlton	Opponent	Result	**Venue**	**Attendance**
Friday, 16 February (6:40 pm)	Melbourne	**2.5.4 (54)**	7.1.6 (86)	Lost by 32 points	Etihad Stadium	22,585
Friday, 16 February (7:36 pm)	North Melbourne	**5.2.6 (68)**	5.4.9 (83)	Lost by 15 points	Etihad Stadium	22,585

=== Pre-season ===
The club played two full-length practice matches as part of the JLT Community Series.

**Date and local time**	**Opponent**	**Scores** (Carlton's scores indicated in **bold**)			**Venue**	**Attendance**
**Date and local time**	**Opponent**	Home	Away	Result	**Venue**	**Attendance**
Wednesday, 28 February (7:10 pm)	St Kilda	**13.11 (89)**	9.13 (67)	Won by 22 points	Ikon Park (H)	8,098
Saturday, 10 March (7:05 pm)	Hawthorn	13.19 (97)	**16.6 (102)**	Won by 5 points	University of Tasmania Stadium (A)	5,405

=== Home and away season ===
**Rd**	**Date and local time**	**Opponent**	**Scores** (Carlton's scores indicated in **bold**)			**Venue**	**Attendance**	**Ladder** **position**
**Rd**	**Date and local time**	**Opponent**	Home	Away	Result	**Venue**	**Attendance**	**Ladder** **position**
1	Thursday, 22 March (7:25 pm)	Richmond	17.19 (121)	**15.5 (95)**	Lost by 26 points	Melbourne Cricket Ground (A)	90,151	12th
2	Saturday, 31 March (1:45 pm)	Gold Coast	**9.13 (67)**	15.11 (101)	Lost by 34 points	Etihad Stadium (H)	28,025	17th
3	Friday, 6 April (7:50 pm)	Collingwood	**11.10 (76)**	16.4 (100)	Lost by 24 points	Melbourne Cricket Ground (H)	68,548	18th
4	Saturday, 14 April (7:25 pm)	North Melbourne	18.8 (116)	**4.6 (30)**	Lost by 86 points	Blundstone Arena (A)	14,266	18th
5	Saturday, 21 April (4:35 pm)	West Coast	**10.9 (69)**	10.19 (79)	Lost by 10 points	Melbourne Cricket Ground (H)	27,900	18th
6	Friday, 27 April (7:50 pm)	Western Bulldogs	11.14 (80)	**8.11 (59)**	Lost by 21 points	Etihad Stadium (A)	33,915	18th
7	Saturday, 5 May (7:10 pm)	Adelaide	19.11 (125)	**10.10 (70)**	Lost by 55 points	Adelaide Oval (A)	47,422	18th
8	Saturday, 12 May (2:10 pm)	Essendon	**14.7 (91)**	10.18 (78)	Won by 13 points	Melbourne Cricket Ground (H)	44,669	17th
9	Sunday, 20 May (1:10 pm)	Melbourne	**7.8 (50)**	25.9 (159)	Lost by 109 points	Melbourne Cricket Ground (H)	44,142	18th
10	Saturday, 26 May (7:25 pm)	Geelong	11.7 (73)	**5.15 (45)**	Lost by 28 points	GMHBA Stadium (A)	31,090	18th
11	Friday, 1 June (7:50 pm)	Sydney	13.13 (91)	**9.7 (61)**	Lost by 30 points	Sydney Cricket Ground (A)	27,351	18th
12	Bye							18th
13	Saturday, 16 June (1:45 pm)	Fremantle	**6.10 (46)**	15.13 (103)	Lost by 57 points	Etihad Stadium (H)	21,430	18th
14	Sunday, 24 June (3:20 pm)	Collingwood	11.13 (79)	**9.5 (59)**	Lost by 20 points	Melbourne Cricket Ground (A)	53,706	18th
15	Saturday, 30 June (1:45 pm)	Port Adelaide	**10.9 (69)**	13.12 (90)	Lost by 21 points	Melbourne Cricket Ground (H)	26,562	18th
16	Saturday, 7 July (1:45 pm)	Brisbane Lions	18.12 (120)	**7.13 (55)**	Lost by 65 points	Gabba (A)	21,074	18th
17	Friday, 13 July (7:50 pm)	St Kilda	16.20 (116)	**7.10 (52)**	Lost by 64 points	Etihad Stadium (A)	33,780	18th
18	Sunday, 22 July (1:10 pm)	Hawthorn	**7.10 (52)**	18.16 (124)	Lost by 72 points	Etihad Stadium (H)	30,405	18th
19	Saturday, 28 July (7:25 pm)	Gold Coast	5.14 (44)	**12.7 (79)**	Won by 35 points	Metricon Stadium (A)	10,776	18th
20	Sunday, 5 August (1:10 pm)	GWS	**7.4 (46)**	23.13 (151)	Lost by 105 points	Etihad Stadium (H)	16,697	18th
21	Sunday, 12 August (2:40 pm)	Fremantle	15.11 (101)	**10.12 (72)**	Lost by 29 points	Optus Stadium (A)	40,028	18th
22	Sunday, 19 August (1:10 pm)	Western Bulldogs	**7.7 (49)**	10.6 (66)	Lost by 17 points	Etihad Stadium (H)	24,143	18th
23	Saturday, 25 August (7:25 pm)	Adelaide	**8.13 (61)**	26.9 (165)	Lost by 104 points	Etihad Stadium (H)	17,000	18th

== Team awards and records ==
Game records and awards

- Round 9 – Carlton's 109-point loss against Melbourne was its heaviest ever defeat against that club.
- Round 20 – Carlton's 105-point loss against Greater Western Sydney was its heaviest ever defeat against that club.
- Round 23 – Carlton's 104-point loss against Adelaide was its heaviest ever defeat against that club.

Season records

- Carlton's percentage of 59.29 was its lowest since the 1901 season.
- Carlton's total points scored during the season of 1353 was its lowest since 1965, and its lowest ever in a 22-game season.
- For the second consecutive year, the club failed to record a score of 100 or higher in any match. 2017 had been the first such season since the 1917 season.
- Carlton suffered three losses of 100 or more points in the season, the most ever in the club's history.

== Individual awards and records ==
=== John Nicholls Medal ===
The Carlton Football Club Best and Fairest awards night took place on 5 October. The John Nicholls Medal, for the best and fairest player of the club, as well as several other awards, were presented on the night.

John Nicholls Medal

The runaway winner of the John Nicholls Medal was Patrick Cripps, who polled 166 votes to comprehensively beat Kade Simpson, who finished second with 108 votes, and Ed Curnow and Charlie Curnow who tied for third with 98 votes. It was Cripps' second John Nicholls Medal, having first won the medal in 2015.

Pos.	Player	Votes
1st	Patrick Cripps	166
2nd	Kade Simpson	108
3rd	Charlie Curnow	98
3rd	Ed Curnow	98
5th	Dale Thomas	71
6th	Liam Jones	48
7th	Zac Fisher	47
8th	Sam Rowe	43
9th	Marc Murphy	39
9th	Matthew Wright	39

Other awards

The following other awards were presented on John Nicholls Medal night:-

- Best First-Year Player – Paddy Dow
- Best Clubman – Matthew Lobbe
- Spirit of Carlton Award – Matthew Lobbe
- Bill Lanyon Inner Blue Ruthless Award – Patrick Cripps
- Carltonians William A. Cook Award – Patrick Cripps

=== Records ===
- Round 23 – in the match against Adelaide, Patrick Cripps accumulated 17 clearances, the most ever by a Carlton player, breaking Brett Ratten's twice-achieved 1999 record of 16. This came despite the club's 104-point loss in the game.

=== Leading goalkickers ===
Charlie Curnow was Carlton's leading goalkicker for the season with 34 goals. It was Curnow's first time as Carlton's leading goalkicker.

Player	Goals	Behinds
Charlie Curnow	34	20
Matthew Wright	21	12
Harry McKay	21	11
Levi Casboult	12	10
Patrick Cripps	11	15

=== Other awards ===
NAB AFL Rising Star

One Carlton player, Paddy Dow was nominated for the 2018 AFL Rising Star award, nominated after his Round 14 performance against Collingwood. Dow received no votes for the final award.

Honorific teams

- All-Australian team – Patrick Cripps was named among the followers in the All-Australian team. No other Carlton players were named in the original 40-man squad.
- 22under22 team – Charlie Curnow was named at centre half-forward in the 2018 22under22 team for the second consecutive season. Zac Fisher was also selected in the original 40-man squad but did not make the final 22.

AFLPA Awards

For each of the AFLPA awards, one or three Carlton players were nominated by an internal vote of Carlton players; Marc Murphy was also nominated for the Best Captain award by default. Patrick Cripps placed second in the Leigh Matthews Trophy voting for Most Valuable Player, polling 529 votes compared with winner Tom Mitchell's 773. Kade Simpson also placed in the Robert Rose Award for Most Courageous Player, finishing fourth.

Leigh Matthews Trophy (Most Valuable Player)

- Patrick Cripps (second place, 529 votes)
- Charlie Curnow (nominated)
- Kade Simpson (nominated)

Robert Rose Award (Most Courageous Player)

- Kade Simpson (fourth place, 73 votes)

Best First Year Player

- Paddy Dow (nominated)

Best Captain

- Marc Murphy (nominated by default)

AFLCA Awards

- Patrick Cripps finished second in the AFL Coaches Association Player of the Year Award with 91 votes, six votes behind winner Max Gawn (Melbourne) who polled 97 votes.

Australian Football Hall of Fame

- Wayne Johnston was inducted into the Australian Football Hall of Fame during the 2018 season. Johnston played 209 for Carlton from 1979 until 1990, playing in the 1979, 1981, 1982 and 1987 premierships and captaining the club from 1984 to 1985.

== Women's teams ==
=== AFL Women's ===
Squad

Key recruitments to the Carlton AFLW squad in the trade period were Brisbane marquee signing Tayla Harris and Collingwood best-and-fairest winner Nicola Stevens. Former first-round draft pick Bianca Jakobsson was traded to Melbourne, and Nat Exon and Bella Ayre were traded to Brisbane. Owing to traded draft picks, Carlton's top selection in the AFLW draft was in the second round (No. 12 overall), used to select Georgia Gee. Altogether, eleven new players joined the Carlton AFLW squad for 2018. Brianna Davey was made captain of the team, having been a vice-captain in its first season; inaugural captain Lauren Arnell became vice-captain alongside Sarah Hosking. Damien Keeping continued as the team's coach for the second season, with assistant coach Nick Rutley also filling in as match day senior coach in two matches when Keeping was absent due to illness.

The following is the final senior squad as announced at the start of the season. Numbers in parentheses represent games played and goals kicked for Carlton in the season. Only supplementary players who played a senior match during the season are listed.

Carlton Football Club Women's Team
Women's team senior list		Coaching staff
1 Brianna Davey (c) (2,0); 2 Katie Loynes (6,2); 3 Darcy Vescio (7,5); 4 Madeline Keryk (2,0); 5 Kate Gillespie-Jones (6,0); 6 Gabriella Pound (7,0); 7 Sarah Last (2,0); 8 Maddison Gay (7,1); 9 Kerryn Harrington (7,0); 10 Sarah Hosking (vc) (7,0); 11 Jessica Hosking (6,0); 12 Lauren Brazzale (5,0); 13 Lauren Arnell (vc) (4,2); 14 Laura Attard (1,0); 15 Tiahna Cochrane (R) (1,0)	16 Breann Moody (7,0); 17 Courtney Webb (R) (2,0); 18 Tilly Lucas-Rodd (6,0); 19 Georgia Gee (6,1); 21 Nicola Stevens (7,1); 22 Tayla Harris (6,5); 23 Bridie Kennedy (4,0); 24 Reni Hicks (4,0); 25 Kate Shierlaw (4,1); 26 Shae Audley (7,0); 28 Katie-Jane Grieve (R) (2,0); 30 Alison Downie (7,3); 31 Danielle Hardiman (6,0); 32 Natalie Plane (2,0); 35 Sophie Li (7,0)	**Head coach**: Damien Keeping; Legend: (c) Captain(s); (vc) Vice-captain(s); (R) Rookie list; Updated: 23 October 2017; Source(s):

Season summary

The team won its first two matches of the season, before falling dramatically from form to lose its last five games – mostly by wide margins – and finish last in the competition. Part of the club's on-field fall from grace was attributed to the season-ending knee injury suffered by captain Brianna Davey in round two.

**Rd**	**Date and local time**	**Opponent**	**Scores** (Carlton's scores indicated in **bold**)			**Venue**	**Attendance**	**Ladder** **position**
**Rd**	**Date and local time**	**Opponent**	Home	Away	Result	**Venue**	**Attendance**	**Ladder** **position**
1	Friday, 2 February (7:40 pm)	Collingwood	**3.4 (22)**	2.2 (14)	Won by 8 points	Ikon Park (H)	19,852	3rd
2	Friday, 9 February (7:05 pm)	GWS	1.3 (9)	**3.12 (30)**	Won by 21 points	Drummoyne Oval (A)	4,952	1st
3	Saturday, 17 February (7:40 pm)	Brisbane	**2.6 (18)**	6.4 (40)	Lost by 22 points	Ikon Park (H)	6,200	4th
4	Friday, 23 February (7:05 pm)	Western Bulldogs	12.14 (86)	**2.1 (13)**	Lost by 73 points	VU Whitten Oval (A)	8,987	5th
5	Saturday, 3 March (6:40 pm)	Adelaide	8.7 (55)	**2.8 (20)**	Lost by 35 points	Norwood Oval (A)	5,970	7th
6	Sunday, 11 March (4:35 pm)	Melbourne	**3.4 (22)**	8.9 (57)	Lost by 35 points	Ikon Park (H)	6,300	8th
7	Saturday, 17 March (2:05 pm)	Fremantle	9.5 (59)	6.12 (48)	Lost by 11 points	Fremantle Oval (A)		8th

Notable events

- The second quarter of the Round 2 match against GWS was delayed for thirty minutes by thunderstorms.
- The Western Bulldogs' score of 12.14 (86) and winning margin of 73 against Carlton in Round 4 both set records as the highest in AFLW history. These records stood until Round 8, 2021 and Round 8, 2022 respectively.

=== VFL Women's ===
Prior to the 2018 season, Carlton was one of six AFL clubs granted a licence in the VFL Women's competition, as part of a significant reconfiguration of that competition which saw all Victorian-based AFL clubs taking a direct or affiliative involvement in a VFLW team. Carlton fielded a women's team, branded as the Carlton Blues, in the VFLW competition from the 2018 season onwards. The team finished 7th out of 13 in the league with a win–loss record of 6–8.

== Northern Blues ==
The Carlton Football Club had full affiliation with the Northern Blues during the 2018 season. It was the sixteenth season of the clubs' affiliation, which had been in place since 2003. Carlton senior- and rookie-listed players who were not selected to play in the Carlton team were eligible to play for the Northern Blues senior team in the Victorian Football League. The club's home matches were split between the VFL club's traditional home ground Preston City Oval, and Carlton's traditional home ground Ikon Park. The team finished 12th out of 15 in the 2018 VFL season with a win–loss record of 6–12.
