= 2017 Carlton Football Club season =

Australian Football League season

Carlton Football Club
2017 season
- President: Mark LoGiudice
- Coach: Brendon Bolton
- Captain: Marc Murphy
- Home grounds: Melbourne Cricket Ground (Training and administrative: Ikon Park)
- AFL season: 16th (6–16)
- AFL Women's: 4th (3–3–1)
- John Nicholls Medal: Marc Murphy
- Leading goalkicker: Levi Casboult (34)
- Club membership: 50,326

The 2017 Carlton Football Club season was the Carlton Football Club's 154th season of competition.

It was the club's men's team's 121st season as a member of the Australian Football League. The team finished sixteenth out of eighteen teams in the 2017 AFL season with a win–loss record of 6–16.

The season saw the inauguration of the club's women's team, which contested its first season as a member of the AFL Women's competition. The team finished fourth out of eight teams in the 2017 AFL Women's season with a 3–3–1 record from seven games.

== Club summary ==
The 2017 AFL season was the 121st season of the VFL/AFL competition since its inception in 1897; and, having competed in every season, it was also the 121st season contested by the Carlton Football Club. Carlton continued its alignment with the Northern Blues in the Victorian Football League, allowing Carlton-listed players to play with the Northern Blues when not selected in AFL matches. Carlton's primary home ground continued to be the Melbourne Cricket Ground, with the club playing six home matches there and five at Etihad Stadium; traditional home ground Ikon Park continued to serve as the training and administrative base.

The club also fielded its women's team in the inaugural season of the AFL Women's competition, running in February and March. Carlton was one of four Victorian clubs granted a license in June 2016 for the eight-team competition. Ikon Park served as the home ground for women's matches.

The club's membership was 50,326, a 0.3% increase on the 2016 season. Car manufacturer Hyundai continued as one of the club's two major sponsorship partners in 2017, having been a major sponsor continuously since 2008. The club's second major sponsorship partner at the beginning of the season was job seekers' services provider CareerOne, which was in the final year of a three-year deal; however, the company withdrew from the sponsorship during May after cash flow difficulties related to a federal government audit of one of its clients. In late May, the club signed airline Virgin Australia, which was already in a secondary level sponsorship deal with the club, as the replacement for CareerOne, with the Virgin logo replacing the CareerOne logo on the team's guernseys from Round 10 onwards. The club posted a $700,000 profit for the year, its first profit since the 2013 season.

== Senior personnel ==
Mark LoGiudice continued as club president, a role he had held since June 2014. Marc Murphy continued in the role of captain for the fifth season; Kade Simpson remained vice-captain. There was one change to the club's seven-man leadership group, with Dennis Armfield elevated to the group to fill the position left by the retirement of Andrew Walker, and Ed Curnow, Bryce Gibbs, Patrick Cripps and Sam Docherty holding their places. Former Western Bulldogs women's exhibition series senior coach Damien Keeping joined the club as the coach of the women's team.

== Squad for 2017 ==
The following is Carlton's squad for the 2017 season.

Statistics are correct as of end of 2017 season. Flags represent the state of origin, i.e. the state in which the player played his Under-18s football.

Senior List
No.	State	Player	Age	AFL Debut	Recruited from	Career (to end 2016)		2017 Player Statistics
No.	State	Player	Age	AFL Debut	Recruited from	Gms	Gls	Gms	Gls	B	D	K	HB	M	T	HO
1	(Victoria (state))	Jack Silvagni	19	2016	Oakleigh (U18)	8	7	20	19	17	201	144	57	90	51	0
3	(Victoria (state))	Marc Murphy (c)	29	2006	Oakleigh (U18)	214	157	22	11	9	656	390	266	127	86	0
4	(South Australia)	Bryce Gibbs (lg)	27	2007	Glenelg	209	120	22	17	13	590	362	228	114	129	0
5	(Western Australia)	Sam Petrevski-Seton	18	2017	Claremont	–	–	20	10	7	28	168	112	65	95	0
6	(Victoria (state))	Kade Simpson (vc)	32	2003	Eastern (U18)	264	127	22	4	3	529	377	152	162	59	0
7	(Victoria (state))	Dylan Buckley	23	2013	Northern (U18)	38	16	1	0	0	8	5	3	0	1	0
8	(Victoria (state))	Matthew Kreuzer	27	2008	Northern (U18)	140	72	21	12	12	321	206	115	69	107	665
9	(Western Australia)	Patrick Cripps (lg)	21	2014	East Fremantle	44	16	15	7	4	374	168	206	65	90	0
10	(Victoria (state))	Harry McKay	19	2017	Gippsland (U18)	–	–	2	3	2	15	11	4	7	1	0
11	(Victoria (state))	Sam Kerridge	23	2012	Bendigo (U18), Adelaide	48	29	11	2	2	238	120	118	55	48	0
12	(Western Australia)	Blaine Boekhorst	23	2015	Swan Districts	18	8	7	7	1	116	77	39	31	21	0
13	(Victoria (state))	Jed Lamb	24	2013	Gippsland (U18), Sydney, GWS	37	30	11	6	10	141	110	31	51	28	0
14	(Tasmania)	Liam Jones	25	2010	North Hobart, Western Bulldogs	83	84	12	0	0	135	95	40	56	34	0
15	(Victoria (state))	Sam Docherty (lg)	23	2013	Gippsland (U18), Brisbane Lions	70	11	22	3	3	613	460	153	199	7	0
16	(Victoria (state))	Billie Smedts	24	2012	Geelong (U18), Geelong	38	19	9	1	3	91	44	47	20	32	0
17	(New South Wales)	Sam Rowe	29	2013	Murray (U18), Sydney, Norwood	73	15	9	1	0	80	44	36	24	13	0
18	(Victoria (state))	Kristian Jaksch	22	2013	Oakleigh (U18), GWS	14	3	0	–	–	–	–	–	–	–	–
19	(Victoria (state))	Liam Sumner	23	2012	Sandringham (U18), GWS	28	17	4	2	1	27	17	10	7	6	0
20	(Victoria (state))	Lachie Plowman	22	2013	Calder (U18), GWS	39	1	21	0	1	301	178	123	111	42	0
22	(Victoria (state))	Caleb Marchbank	20	2015	Murray (U18), GWS	7	0	16	0	1	248	184	64	102	40	0
23	(Victoria (state))	Jacob Weitering	19	2016	Dandenong (U18)	20	2	22	7	3	301	198	103	122	28	0
24	(Western Australia)	Rhys Palmer	27	2008	East Fremantle, Fremantle, GWS	122	95	1	0	0	12	6	6	4	2	0
25	(Western Australia)	Zac Fisher	18	2017	Perth	–	–	17	4	4	197	93	104	22	50	0
26	(New South Wales)	Harrison Macreadie	18	2017	Henty	–	–	8	0	0	61	35	26	17	19	0
27	(Western Australia)	Dennis Armfield (lg)	30	2008	Swan Districts	140	73	5	2	1	55	37	18	25	11	0
28	(Victoria (state))	David Cuningham	19	2016	Oakleigh (U18)	3	–	8	6	1	103	63	40	27	34	0
29	(Victoria (state))	Cameron Polson	18	2017	Sandringham (U18)	–	–	1	0	1	11	3	8	0	2	0
30	(Victoria (state))	Charlie Curnow	19	2016	Geelong (U18)	6	5	21	20	12	297	207	90	119	61	6
31	(Victoria (state))	Tom Williamson	18	2017	North Ballarat (U18)	–	–	15	1	3	182	116	66	51	35	0
32	(Victoria (state))	Nicholas Graham	22	2013	Gippsland (U18)	28	7	10	3	4	182	116	66	51	47	0
33	(Western Australia)	Jarrod Pickett	20	2017	South Fremantle, GWS	–	–	10	6	5	91	56	35	20	21	0
34	(Tasmania)	Andrew Phillips	25	2012	Lauderdale, GWS	30	11	1	0	0	5	3	2	1	3	29
35	(Victoria (state))	Ed Curnow (lg)	27	2011	Geelong (U18), Adelaide, Box Hill	109	16	13	6	3	282	156	126	51	66	0
36	(Victoria (state))	Pat Kerr	18	–	Oakleigh (U18)	–	–	0	–	–	–	–	–	–	–	–
37	(South Australia)	Daniel Gorringe	24	2011	Norwood, Gold Coast	26	11	0	–	–	–	–	–	–	–	–
38	(Republic of Ireland)	Ciarán Byrne	22	2015	Louth GAA	12	–	3	0	0	39	21	18	13	2	0
39	(Victoria (state))	Dale Thomas	29	2006	Gippsland (U18), Collingwood	200	141	18	8	7	315	196	119	103	31	0
41	(Victoria (state))	Levi Casboult	26	2012	Dandenong (U18)	72	71	22	34	18	220	144	76	120	39	157
43	(Western Australia)	Simon White	28	2010	Subiaco	76	12	11	0	0	142	97	45	56	21	0
46	(South Australia)	Matthew Wright	27	2011	North Adelaide, Adelaide	116	85	22	30	12	357	236	121	96	64	0
Rookie List
No.	State	Player	Age	AFL Debut	Recruited from	Career (to end 2016)		2017 Player Statistics
No.	State	Player	Age	AFL Debut	Recruited from	Gms	Gls	Gms	Gls	B	D	K	HB	M	T	HO
21	(Republic of Ireland)	Ciarán Sheehan	26	2014	Cork GAA	4	–	2	0	0	19	11	8	5	2	0
40	(Western Australia)	Jesse Glass-McCasker	19	–	Swan Districts	–	–	0	–	–	–	–	–	–	–	–
42	(South Australia)	Kym LeBois	18	–	North Adelaide	–	–	0	–	–	–	–	–	–	–	–
44	(Victoria (state))	Alex Silvagni	29	2010	Casey, Fremantle	53	10	7	0	0	73	45	28	31	33	0
45	(Victoria (state))	Andrew Gallucci	22	–	Calder (U18), Williamstown	–	–	0	–	–	–	–	–	–	–	–
48	(United States)	Matt Korcheck	25	–	Arizona	–	–	0	–	–	–	–	–	–	–	–
Senior coaching panel
	State	Coach	Coaching position				Carlton Coaching debut		Former clubs as coach
	(Tasmania)	Brendon Bolton	Senior Coach				2016		North Hobart (s), Tasmania (VFL) (s), Clarence (s), Box Hill (s), Hawthorn (a)
	(Victoria (state))	John Barker	Assistant coach (Stoppages)				2011		St Kilda (a), Hawthorn (a)
	(South Australia)	Neil Craig	Director of Coaching, Development and Performance				2016		Norwood (s), Adelaide (s), Melbourne (cs), Essendon (m)
	(Victoria (state))	Tim Clarke	Assistant coach (Midfield)				2016		Richmond (a), Coburg (s), Richmond reserves (s)
	(Victoria (state))	Shane Watson	Assistant coach (Forward-line)				2016		Lower Plenty (s), Sandringham (U18) (a), Eastern (U18) (s), North Melbourne (a)
	(Victoria (state))	Dale Amos	Assistant coach (Back-line)				2016		South Barwon (s), Geelong (a), Geelong reserves (s)
	(Victoria (state))	Matthew Capuano	Development coach				2009
	(Victoria (state))	Josh Fraser	Development coach, Northern Blues senior coach				2016		Gold Coast reserves (s)

- For players: (c) denotes captain, (vc) denotes vice-captain, (dvc) denotes deputy vice-captain, (lg) denotes leadership group.
- For coaches: (s) denotes senior coach, (cs) denotes caretaker senior coach, (a) denotes assistant coach, (d) denotes development coach, (m) denotes managerial or administrative role in a football or coaching department

== Playing list changes ==
The following summarises all player changes which have occurred since the conclusion of the 2016 season. Unless otherwise noted, draft picks refer to selections in the 2016 AFL draft.

Two high-profile players requested trades away from Carlton in the lead-up to the trade period: Zach Tuohy and Bryce Gibbs. Gibbs was two years into a five-year contract, but sought a return to Adelaide for family reasons, nominating the Adelaide Crows as his preferred destination. Tuohy, out of contract but not a free agent, nominated Geelong as his preferred destination. Carlton was also linked to young out-of-contract Greater Western Sydney defender Caleb Marchbank, who was seeking to return to his home state Victoria and nominated Carlton as his preferred destination. In the end, deals were secured for Tuohy and Marchbank, but Carlton and Adelaide could not come to an agreement on a trade for Gibbs and he remained on the Carlton list.

=== In ===
Player	Former Club	League	via
(Victoria (state)) Billie Smedts	Geelong	AFL	AFL Trade Period, along with a fourth-round draft pick (provisionally No. 63) and Geelong's first-round draft pick in the 2017 National Draft, in exchange for Zach Tuohy and Carlton's second-round draft pick in the 2017 National Draft.
(Victoria (state)) Caleb Marchbank	Greater Western Sydney	AFL	AFL Trade Period, along with GWS' second-round draft pick in the 2017 National Draft, in exchange for third- and fourth-round draft picks (provisionally No. 45 and 58) and Geelong's first-round draft pick in the 2017 National Draft.
(Western Australia) Jarrod Pickett	Greater Western Sydney	AFL	AFL Trade Period, along with GWS' second-round draft pick in the 2017 National Draft, in exchange for third- and fourth-round draft picks (provisionally No. 45 and 58) and Geelong's first-round draft pick in the 2017 National Draft.
(Western Australia) Rhys Palmer	Greater Western Sydney	AFL	AFL Trade Period, in exchange for an eighth-round draft pick (provisionally No. 135).
(Western Australia) Sam Petrevski-Seton	Claremont	WAFL	AFL National Draft, first round (No. 6 overall).
(Western Australia) Zac Fisher	Perth	WAFL	AFL National Draft, second round (No. 27 overall).
(New South Wales) Harrison Macreadie	Henty	Hume FL	AFL National Draft, third round (No. 47 overall). Eligible as a Greater Western Sydney academy selection but Carlton's bid was not matched by GWS.
(Victoria (state)) Cameron Polson	Sandringham Dragons	TAC Cup	AFL National Draft, fourth round (No. 59 overall).
(Victoria (state)) Tom Williamson	North Ballarat Rebels	TAC Cup	AFL National Draft, fourth round (No. 61 overall).
(Victoria (state)) Pat Kerr	Oakleigh Chargers	TAC Cup	AFL National Draft, fourth round (No. 65 overall).
(South Australia) Kym LeBois	North Adelaide	SANFL	AFL Rookie Draft, first round (No. 5 overall).
(Victoria (state)) Alex Silvagni	Fremantle	AFL	AFL Rookie Draft, second round (No. 23 overall).

=== Out ===
Player	New Club	League	via
(Victoria (state)) Andrew Walker	West Preston Lakeside	Northern FL	Retired
(Victoria (state)) Michael Jamison			Retired
(South Australia) Cameron Wood	Avondale Heights	Essendon District FL	Retired from the rookie list
(Victoria (state)) Matthew Dick	Macedon	Riddell District FL	Delisted prior to the trade period
(Victoria (state)) Jayden Foster	Footscray reserves	VFL	Delisted prior to the trade period
(Western Australia) Clem Smith	Perth	WAFL	Delisted prior to the trade period
(Republic of Ireland) Zach Tuohy	Geelong	AFL	AFL Trade Period, along with the club's second-round draft pick in the 2017 National Draft, in exchange for Billie Smedts, a fourth-round draft pick (provisionally No. 63) and Geelong's first-round draft pick in the 2017 National Draft.
(Victoria (state)) Andrejs Everitt	Somerville	MPNFL	Delisted following the trade period
Jason Tutt	De La Salle	VAFA	Delisted following the trade period
(Victoria (state)) Dillon Viojo-Rainbow	Port Melbourne	VFL	Delisted following the trade period
(New South Wales) Mark Whiley	Yarrawonga	O&MFL	Delisted following the trade period
(Victoria (state)) Billy Gowers	Footscray reserves	VFL	Delisted from the rookie list following the trade period

=== List management ===
Player	Change
National draft	Carlton traded Greater Western Sydney's second-round pick in the 2017 National Draft (which was obtained in the trade for Caleb Marchbank and Jarrod Pickett) to Hawthorn in exchange for a third-round draft pick and two fourth-round draft picks (provisionally No. 48, 66 and 70).
(Republic of Ireland) Ciarán Byrne	Elevated from the rookie list to the senior list.
(Victoria (state)) Andrew Gallucci	Initially delisted from the rookie list following the trade period, but received permission to continue training with the club after being delisted, and was redrafted in the third round of the rookie draft (No. 39 overall).
(Republic of Ireland) Ciarán Sheehan	Initially delisted from the rookie list following the trade period, but received permission to continue training with the club after being delisted, and was then re-added to the rookie list as an out-of-draft selection.
(Victoria (state)) Billy Gowers	Received permission to continue training with the club after being delisted, but was not re-drafted.
(New South Wales) Will Setterfield	Greater Western Sydney Academy Player. Carlton bid on Setterfield in the AFL National Draft in the first round (pick No. 5 overall); GWS then matched Carlton's bid and recruited Setterfield with its next two selections (No. 15 and 37).
Guernsey number changes	Jack Silvagni (No. 2 to No. 1); Jesse Glass-McCasker (No. 47 to No. 40)

== Season summary ==
=== Practice matches ===
The club played three practice matches as part of the JLT Community Series.

**Date and local time**	**Opponent**	**Scores** (Carlton's scores indicated in **bold**)			**Venue**	**Attendance**
**Date and local time**	**Opponent**	Home	Away	Result	**Venue**	**Attendance**
Saturday, 25 February (2:05 pm)	Melbourne	0.17.14 (116)	**0.9.8 (62)**	Lost by 54 points	Casey Fields (A)	7,256
Saturday, 4 March (2:05 pm)	St Kilda	**0.4.6 (30)**	0.18.14 (122)	Lost by 92 points	Ikon Park (H)	15,485
Friday, 10 March (5:40 pm)	Fremantle	2.12.14 (104)	**0.12.11 (83)**	Lost by 21 points	Domain Stadium (A)	6,639

=== Home and away season ===
The club entered the season continuing to rebuild its playing list under a youth policy, and thus despite having won seven games in 2016, the club was expected to fare poorly, with about half of all pundits across the major newspapers and media outlets predicting the club would finish last. The club eventually finished with a 6–16 record, one fewer win than in 2016, to finish sixteenth, one win and percentage ahead of wooden spooners Brisbane Lions.

As in 2016, the club was stronger in the first half of the year than the second, sitting with win–loss records of 3–4 after Round 7 and 4–7 after Round 13, before winning only one of its final ten games. The club's win–loss formline when compared to its opponents' finishing position was unusually erratic, with the club finishing:

- 2–6 against the top six. This included upset wins against Greater Western Sydney and Sydney and a 12-point loss to minor premiers Adelaide, as well as its four heaviest losses
- 3–6 against teams ranked seventh to thirteenth, with no losing margin heavier than four goals against those teams
- 1–4 against the other four teams in the bottom five, with three of the four losses heavier than four goals and the only win coming against Gold Coast

Carlton was usually able to keep close in its games, and led at least ten minutes into the final quarter in eight of its sixteen losses.

As in 2016, the team's strength was built on its defence, with the club continuing to build its backline with the recruitment of Caleb Marchbank from Greater Western Sydney, the conversion of Liam Jones from a fringe key forward to a dominant key defender, and the continued growth of rebounder Sam Docherty, who was selected in the All-Australian team. Its biggest weakness was its inability to score, and the club was the lowest-scoring in the league (having been second-lowest in 2016 behind suspension-affected Essendon) and failed to score 100 points in any game for the first time since 1917.

**Rd**	**Date and local time**	**Opponent**	**Scores** (Carlton's scores indicated in **bold**)			**Venue**	**Attendance**	**Ladder** **position**
**Rd**	**Date and local time**	**Opponent**	Home	Away	Result	**Venue**	**Attendance**	**Ladder** **position**
1	Thursday, 23 March (7:25 pm)	Richmond	**14.5 (89)**	20.12 (132)	Lost by 43 points	Melbourne Cricket Ground (H)	73,137	16th
2	Sunday, 2 April (3:20 pm)	Melbourne	13.8 (86)	**9.10 (64)**	Lost by 22 points	Melbourne Cricket Ground (A)	46,727	16th
3	Sunday, 9 April (3:20 pm)	Essendon	**7.15 (57)**	6.6 (42)	Won by 15 points	Melbourne Cricket Ground (H)	48,022	14th
4	Saturday, 15 April (7:25 pm)	Gold Coast	**12.10 (82)**	17.6 (108)	Lost by 26 points	Etihad Stadium (H)	24,968	14th
5	Friday, 21 April (7:20 pm)	Port Adelaide	20.17 (137)	**6.11 (47)**	Lost by 90 points	Adelaide Oval (A)	43,120	16th
6	Saturday, 29 April (2:10 pm)	Sydney	**15.7 (97)**	11.12 (78)	Won by 19 points	Melbourne Cricket Ground (H)	32,678	14th
7	Saturday, 6 May (2:10 pm)	Collingwood	8.8 (56)	**12.7 (79)**	Won by 23 points	Melbourne Cricket Ground (A)	70,279	13th
8	Saturday, 13 May (2:10 pm)	St Kilda	12.13 (85)	**10.6 (66)**	Lost by 19 points	Etihad Stadium (A)	38,014	13th
9	Sunday, 21 May (2:40 pm)	Fremantle	13.8 (86)	**7.9 (51)**	Lost by 35 points	Domain Stadium (A)	30,313	16th
10	Sunday, 28 May (3:20 pm)	North Melbourne	**15.6 (96)**	17.11 (113)	Lost by 17 points	Etihad Stadium (H)	32,802	17th
11	Bye							17th
12	Sunday, 11 June (3:20 pm)	GWS	**10.11 (71)**	9.16 (70)	Won by 1 point	Etihad Stadium (H)	23,194	16th
13	Saturday, 17 June (7:25 pm)	Gold Coast	11.7 (73)	**12.11 (83)**	Won by 10 points	Metricon Stadium (A)	11,936	15th
14	Sunday, 25 June (3:20 pm)	Richmond	11.18 (84)	**8.10 (58)**	Lost by 26 points	Melbourne Cricket Ground (A)	64,448	15th
15	Saturday, 1 June (2:10 pm)	Adelaide	**12.5 (77)**	13.11 (89)	Lost by 12 points	Melbourne Cricket Ground (H)	33,433	16th
16	Sunday, 9 July (3:20 pm)	Melbourne	**12.10 (82)**	14.6 (90)	Lost by 8 points	Melbourne Cricket Ground (H)	47,266	16th
17	Sunday, 16 July (3:20 pm)	Western Bulldogs	**9.8 (62)**	12.10 (82)	Lost by 20 points	Melbourne Cricket Ground (H)	35,157	16th
18	Sunday, 23 July (4:40 pm)	Brisbane Lions	17.10 (112)	**11.16 (82)**	Lost by 30 points	The Gabba (A)	18,847	16th
19	Saturday, 29 July (7:25 pm)	Geelong	**8.10 (58)**	18.15 (123)	Lost by 65 points	Etihad Stadium (H)	35,460	17th
20	Saturday, 5 August (2:10 pm)	Essendon	11.18 (84)	**11.10 (76)**	Lost by 8 points	Melbourne Cricket Ground (A)	58,562	17th
21	Saturday, 12 August (5:40 pm)	West Coast	15.10 (100)	**12.11 (83)**	Lost by 17 points	Domain Stadium (A)	30,491	17th
22	Saturday, 19 August (7:25 pm)	Hawthorn	**12.5 (77)**	10.10 (70)	Won by 7 points	Etihad Stadium (H)	35,799	15th
23	Saturday, 26 August (4:35 pm)	Sydney	21.12 (138)	**8.9 (57)**	Lost by 81 points	Sydney Cricket Ground (A)	38,965	16th

== Team awards and records ==
Game records and awards

- Round 3 – Carlton laid a total of 111 tackles against Essendon, the most tackles ever laid by the club in a single game; the record was aided by the wet weather, with such conditions always conducive to high tackling games.
- Round 3 – with scoring affected by heavy rain which fell throughout the game, Carlton's score of 7.15 (57) was its lowest winning score since Round 12, 1989, and Essendon's score of 6.6 (42) was the lowest score Carlton had conceded since Round 22, 2001.
- Round 3 – the club won the Madden Cup as winners of its rivalry game against Essendon.
- Round 7 – the club won the Peter Mac Cup as winners of its rivalry game against Collingwood.
- Round 22 – the club defeated Hawthorn for the first time since Round 6, 2005, ending a fourteen-game losing streak. It was the club's equal-longest VFL/AFL losing streak against a single opponent, matching the fourteen game losing streak against Essendon in 1897–1902.
- The club failed to record a score of 100 or higher in any match in 2017, the first such season since the 1917 season.

Other notes

- Round 3 – the club used a once-off alternative guernsey known as the "Blueout Guernsey" against Essendon. Intended as a tribute to the suburb of Carlton, the guernsey design matched the home guernsey, except that the monogram and numbers were navy blue with a white outline, and the guernsey was finished with a subtle pattern representing bluestone.
- Round 7 – the away match against Collingwood was staged to celebrate the 125th anniversary of Collingwood's inaugural senior premiership game, played against Carlton in the 1892 VFA season.

== Individual awards and records ==
=== John Nicholls Medal ===
The Carlton Football Club Best and Fairest awards night took place on 22 September. The John Nicholls Medal, for the best and fairest player of the club, as well as several other awards, were presented on the night.

John Nicholls Medal

The winner of the John Nicholls Medal was Marc Murphy, who polled 174 votes to beat 2016 winner Sam Docherty (169 votes) and Matthew Kreuzer (164 votes). It was Murphy's second John Nicholls Medal, having first won the medal six years earlier in 2011. Matthew Kreuzer's third placing was the best performance of this career, and he also swept the coterie group awards. Also notable was the ninth-placing of Liam Jones, who in his first season as a defender polled 84 votes from only twelve games – a votes-per-game average which would have been high enough for fourth place had been played the entire season – and the seventh- and tenth-placings of Lachie Plowman and Charlie Curnow, who reached the count's top ten for the first times in their careers.

Pos.	Player	Votes
1st	Marc Murphy	174
2nd	Sam Docherty	169
3rd	Matthew Kreuzer	164
4th	Bryce Gibbs	130
5th	Kade Simpson	103
6th	Matthew Wright	103
7th	Lachie Plowman	95
8th	Patrick Cripps	92
9th	Liam Jones	84
10th	Charlie Curnow	81

Other awards

The following other awards were presented on John Nicholls Medal night:-

- Best First-Year Player – Sam Petrevski-Seton
- Best Clubman – Dennis Armfield
- Spirit of Carlton Award – Matthew Kreuzer
- Bill Lanyon Inner Blue Ruthless Award – Matthew Kreuzer
- Carltonians William A. Cook Award – Matthew Kreuzer
- Hyundai MVP Award (the most valuable player as voted by fans in an online poll) – Sam Docherty and Marc Murphy

=== Records ===
- Round 13 – in the match against Gold Coast, Bryce Gibbs accumulated 43 disposals, the most by a Carlton player since Gibbs' 45 disposals against West Coast in Round 10, 2010; including 31 kicks, the most by a Carlton player since Scott Camporeale's 31 kicks against Port Adelaide in Round 6, 2000.
- Season – Sam Docherty led all players in the AFL in both kicks (460) and marks (199) across the home-and-away season.

=== Leading goalkickers ===
Levi Casboult was Carlton's leading goalkicker for the season with 34 goals. It was Casboult's only time finishing as the club's leading goalkicker, after having been the second highest goalkicker in 2015 and 2016. 2016 leading goalkicker Matthew Wright was second.

Player	Goals	Behinds
Levi Casboult	34	18
Matthew Wright	30	12
Charlie Curnow	20	12
Jack Silvagni	19	17
Bryce Gibbs	17	13

=== Other awards ===
NAB AFL Rising Star

Five Carlton players were nominated for the 2017 AFL Rising Star award. This was the most ever nominated in a single season in the club, exceeding the three players nominated in 2003. Two of those players polled votes in the final count: Charlie Curnow, who was fourth with 27 votes, and Sam Petrevski-Seton, who was sixth with 3 votes. The nominees were:

- Round 6 – Caleb Marchbank (nominated)
- Round 7 – Sam Petrevski-Seton – 3 votes (sixth place)
- Round 12 – David Cuningham (nominated)
- Round 13 – Jack Silvagni (nominated)
- Round 16 – Charlie Curnow – 27 votes (fourth place)

Representative honours

The following Carlton players were selected for representative teams during the 2017 season.

- In the 2017 International Rules Series, for Australia: Kade Simpson

Honorific teams

- All-Australian team – Sam Docherty was named on the half-back flank in the All-Australian team. It was Docherty's first All-Australian team selection, having also been nominated in the 40-man squad in 2016, and he was the first Carlton player since 2011 to be selected in the final 22. Matthew Kreuzer was also nominated in the 40-man squad.
- 22under22 team – Charlie Curnow was named at centre half-forward in the 2017 22under22 team. Patrick Cripps was also nominated in the 40-man squad but was not voted into the final team.

AFLPA Awards

For each of the AFLPA awards, one or three Carlton players were nominated by an internal vote of Carlton players; Marc Murphy was also nominated for the Best Captain award by default. Sam Petrevski-Seton placed third for the best first-year player award.

Leigh Matthews Trophy (Most Valuable Player)

- Sam Docherty (nominated)
- Marc Murphy (nominated)
- Kade Simpson (nominated)

Robert Rose Award (Most Courageous Player)

- Matthew Kreuzer (nominated)

Best First Year Player

- Sam Petrevski-Seton (third place, 48 votes)

Other awards

- Round 22 – Sam Docherty won the Parkin Medal as best on ground in the match against Hawthorn.

== Women's team ==
=== Squad ===
Under the competition's player recruitment regulations, each of the eight clubs was entitled to sign two marquee players. In July 2016, Carlton recruited St Kilda Sharks key position/midfielder and former Australian international soccer goalkeeper Brianna Davey and Darebin Falcons full forward Darcy Vescio as its marquee players. Darebin midfielder Lauren Arnell also signed with the club as a priority signing due to her pre-existing relationship with the club as its Female Football Ambassador. The club drew most of its remaining recruits from the inaugural AFL Women's draft, with Cranbourne forward Bianca Jakobsson taken with Carlton's first round selection at No. 3 overall. Arnell was made the inaugural captain of the team, with Davey and Madeline Keryk serving as vice-captains.

The following is the final senior squad as announced at the start of the season. Numbers in parentheses represent games played and goals kicked for Carlton in the season. Only supplementary players who played a senior match during the season are listed.

Carlton Football Club Women's Team
Women's team senior list		Supplementaries	Coaching staff
1 Brianna Davey (vc) (6,1); 2 Katie Loynes (7,1); 3 Darcy Vescio (7,14); 4 Madeline Keryk (vc) (6,0); 5 Kate Gillespie-Jones (7,0); 6 Gabriella Pound (7,1); 7 Sarah Last (3,0); 8 Kate Darby (2,0); 9 Rebecca Privitelli (5,1); 10 Sarah Hosking (7,2); 11 Jessica Hosking (0,0); 12 Lauren Brazzale (7,1); 13 Lauren Arnell (c) (7,2); 14 Laura Attard (7,0)	15 Nat Exon (5,0); 16 Breann Moody (7,1); 18 Tilly Lucas-Rodd (7,0); 22 Isabella Ayre (6,4); 23 Jessica Kennedy (4,0); 25 Kate Shierlaw (6,2); 26 Shae Audley (7,2); 27 Alison Brown (7,0); 30 Alison Downie (7,2); 31 Danielle Hardiman (6,0); 32 Natalie Plane (1,0); 33 Hayley Trevean (1,0); 35 Bianca Jakobsson (7,4)	20 Tahni Nestor (3,0); 27 Jordan Ivey (2,1)	**Head coach**: Damien Keeping; Legend: (c) Captain(s); (vc) Vice-captain(s); Updated: Source(s):

=== Season ===
The club played each of the other seven clubs once in the home-and-away series of the inaugural AFL Women's fixture over February and March. The main highlight of the fixture was the Round 1 match against Collingwood, which saw the two traditional men's rivals play the first match in the new competition's history. The match, for which admission was free, drew a lockout crowd of 24,568 at Ikon Park, after having originally been scheduled for Collingwood's 5,000-capacity Olympic Park training oval then being transferred due to the expected crowd. The team's Round 4, 5 and 6 matches against Melbourne, Fremantle and the Western Bulldogs served as curtain-raisers to the senior team's pre-season practice matches against the same clubs.

The club finished fourth out of eight on the ladder, with a final record of 3–3–1.

**Rd**	**Date and local time**	**Opponent**	**Scores** (Carlton's scores indicated in **bold**)			**Venue**	**Attendance**	**Ladder** **position**
**Rd**	**Date and local time**	**Opponent**	Home	Away	Result	**Venue**	**Attendance**	**Ladder** **position**
1	Friday, 3 February (7:40 pm)	Collingwood	**7.4 (46)**	1.5 (11)	Won by 35 points	Ikon Park (H)	24,568	1st
2	Saturday, 11 February (3:35 pm)	GWS	**7.5 (47)**	5.4 (34)	Won by 13 points	Ikon Park (H)	8,000	2nd
3	Sunday, 19 February (11:35 am)	Adelaide	2.5 (17)	**2.2 (14)**	Lost by 3 points	Thebarton Oval (A)	9,006	3rd
4	Saturday, 25 February (11:35 am)	Melbourne	6.6 (42)	**5.6 (36)**	Lost by 6 points	Casey Fields (A)	3,965	4th
5	Saturday, 4 March (11:35 am)	Western Bulldogs	**8.6 (54)**	7.6 (48)	Won by 6 points	Ikon Park (H)	6,833	3rd
6	Friday, 10 March (3:05 pm)	Fremantle	6.7 (43)	**4.3 (27)**	Lost by 16 points	Domain Stadium (A)	1,200	4th
7	Sunday, 19 March (3:35 pm)	Brisbane Lions	**6.1 (37)**	5.7 (37)	Match drawn	Ikon Park (H)	5,801	4th

The following individual awards were won by Carlton players:

- Brianna Davey won the club's inaugural AFLW best and fairest award with 53 votes. Davey finished ahead of Danielle Hardiman (31 votes) and Alison Downie (28 votes).
- Darcy Vescio was the league's leading goalkicker, kicking 14 goals to finish three goals ahead of Sarah Perkins (Adelaide)
- Brianna Davey and Darcy Vescio were the only two Carlton players named in the All-Australian Team.
- Darcy Vescio won the league's Mark of the Year award.

== Northern Blues ==
The Carlton Football Club had a full affiliation with the Northern Blues during the 2017 season. It was the fifteenth season of the clubs' affiliation, which had been in place since 2003. Carlton senior- and rookie-listed players who were not selected to play in the Carlton team were eligible to play for either the Northern Blues seniors or reserves team in the Victorian Football League. The club's nine home matches were split with six matches at the VFL club's traditional home ground Preston City Oval, and three matches at Carlton's traditional home ground Ikon Park. The Northern Blues finished 9th out of 15 in the VFL with a record of 8–10 to miss the finals on percentage by 8.1%pts.
