= Jayde Van Dyk =

Australian rules footballer (born 1996)

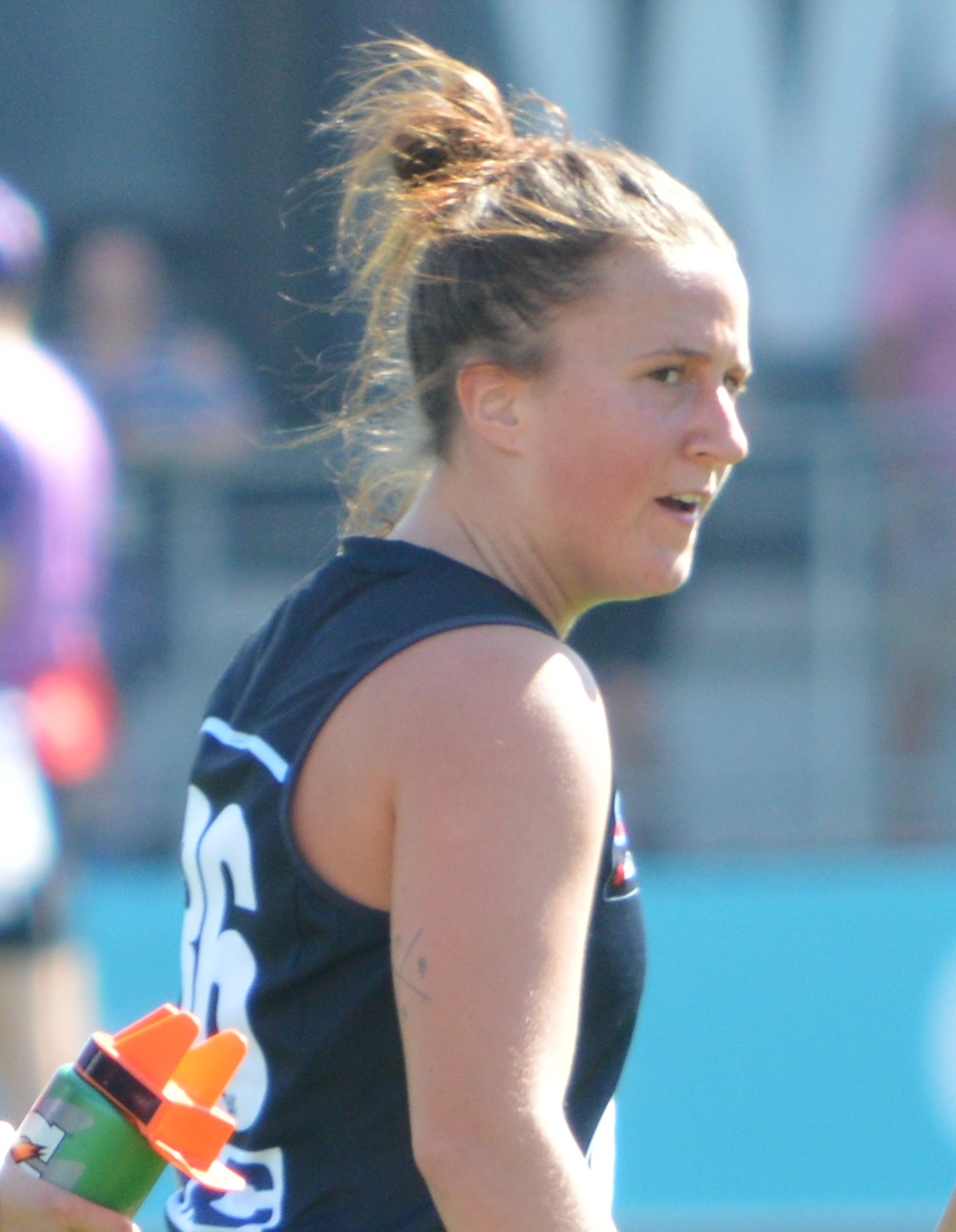
- Van Dyk with Carlton in March 2019

Personal information
- Born: 28 March 1996 (age 30)
- Original team: Hawthorn (VFLW)
- Draft: No. 21, 2018 AFLW draft
- Debut: Round 1, 2019, Carlton vs. North Melbourne, at North Hobart Oval
- Height: 168 cm (5 ft 6 in)
- Position: Defender

Club information
- Current club: St Kilda
- Number: 36

Playing career^{1}
Years	Club	Games (Goals)
2019–2020	Carlton	10 (0)
2021–2023	St Kilda	20 (0)
Total		30 (0)
- ^{1} Playing statistics correct to the end of the S7 (2022) season.

Career highlights
- Debbie Lee Medal (VFLW Rising Star): 2018

Jayde Van Dyk (born 28 March 1996) is an Australian rules footballer playing for St Kilda in the AFL Women's (AFLW). A defender who played with Hawthorn in the VFL Women's (VFLW), she was drafted by Carlton with the twenty-first selection in the 2018 AFLW draft. Van Dyk debuted in the opening round of the 2019 season and played in the 2019 AFL Women's Grand Final.

== Early career ==
Van Dyk played for her local club in Chirnside Park, Victoria. She trained with Carlton as injury cover during their inaugural AFLW season in 2017, which she cited as the point when she first sought to play professional football. Van Dyk joined Hawthorn's VFLW team, where she wore number 36, and played in their 2018 premiership. She won the 2018 Debbie Lee Medal as the best young player in the VFLW, Hawthorn's best and fairest, and was named in the VFLW Team of the Year in defence. Ahead of the 2018 AFLW draft, Van Dyk was predicted to be the first mature-age player selected.

== AFLW career ==
Van Dyk was drafted by Carlton with the twenty-first pick in the 2018 AFLW draft, their third selection. She debuted in the opening round of the 2019 season: a loss to North Melbourne at North Hobart Oval. Van Dyk appreciated leadership shown by her experienced teammates, citing Brianna Davey, Kerryn Harrington, Tayla Harris, Gab Pound, and Darcy Vescio as examples. She played nine games in her first season, including the preliminary final and grand final. It was revealed Van Dyk had signed on with the Saints for two more years on 30 June 2021, tying her to the club until the end of the 2022/2023 season. She was delisted at the end of the 2023 season.
