= Harrison Macreadie =

Australian rules footballer

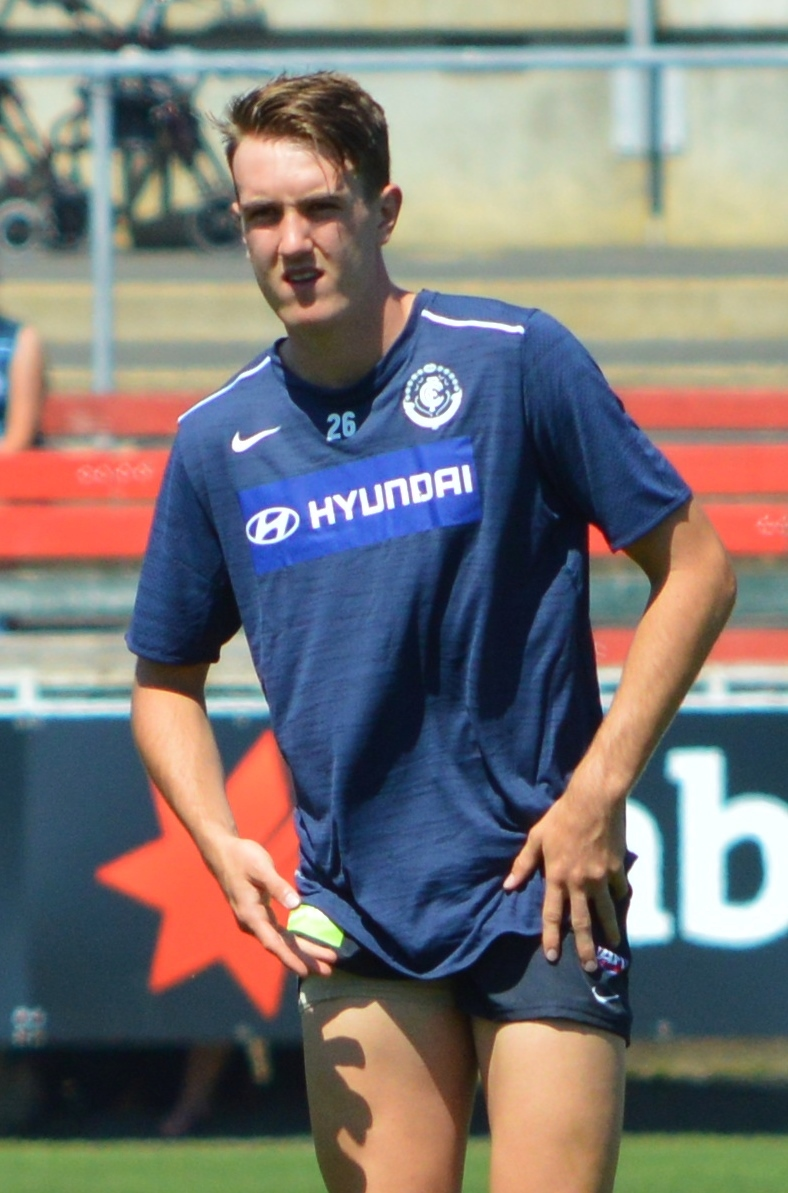
- Macreadie warming-up for Carlton in March 2017

Personal information
- Full name: Harrison Macreadie
- Born: 11 April 1998 (age 28)
- Original team: Henty (Hume FL)
- Draft: No. 47, 2016 national draft
- Debut: Round 1, 2017, Carlton vs. Richmond, at Melbourne Cricket Ground
- Height: 198 cm (6 ft 6 in)
- Weight: 92 kg (203 lb)
- Position: Defender / Midfielder

Club information
- Current club: Carlton
- Number: 26

Playing career^{1}
Years	Club	Games (Goals)
2017–2020	Carlton	9 (0)
- ^{1} Playing statistics correct to the end of Round 10, 2019.

Harrison Macreadie (born 11 April 1998) is a former professional Australian rules footballer who played for the Carlton Football Club in the Australian Football League (AFL). An academy player with Greater Western Sydney (GWS), he was drafted by the Carlton Football Club with their third selection and forty-seventh overall in the 2016 national draft after GWS elected not to match Carlton's bid. He made his debut in the forty-three point loss against Richmond in the opening round of the 2017 season at the Melbourne Cricket Ground, where he was a late inclusion for the injured Jed Lamb.

Macreadie held a place on the Carlton list for four seasons. He played eight games in his debut season 2017, but injuries hampered the rest of his time at the club and he played only one more senior game, that match coming in 2019. He was delisted at the end of the 2020 season.
