= Shane Watson (footballer) =

Australian rules footballer (born 1974)

Personal information
- Full name: Shane Watson
- Born: 17 February 1974 (age 52)
- Original team: Montmorency
- Height: 186 cm (6 ft 1 in)
- Weight: 90 kg (198 lb)

Playing career^{1}
Years	Club	Games (Goals)
1992–2000	Collingwood	141 (102)
- ^{1} Playing statistics correct to the end of 2000.

Career highlights
- Joseph Wren Memorial Trophy 2000

Shane Watson (born 17 February 1974) is a former Australian rules footballer who played with the Collingwood Football Club in the Australian Football League (AFL). He previously served as the forwards coach of the North Melbourne Football Club.

Watson came to Collingwood from Montmorency and had an eventful start to his AFL career. He had just turned 18 when he made his league debut against the Brisbane Bears and kicked two goals, in addition to four behinds. Two weeks later, he kicked five goals in a win over Essendon at Waverley.

He had a good season as a half back flanker in 1993, finishing second in Collingwood's "Best and Fairest" voting after averaging 16 disposals for the year. In 1994 he took 104 marks, played in their qualifying final against West Coast and once more averaged 16 disposals a game. He was used as a forward in the 1998 season, for a return of 33 goals.

Delisted after the 2000 season, Watson continued playing at the Northern Bullants and was a "Best and Fairest" winner in 2003. He coached the Lower Plenty Football Club in the DVFL for 2005 and was then the assistant coach of TAC Cup side Sandringham for a season. From 2007 to 2009, Watson was in charge of the Eastern Ranges in the TAC Cup. He joined North Melbourne as an assistant to Brad Scott prior to the 2010 season. In 2016, he was a part of the Carlton coaching team, where he stayed until the end of 2019.

He briefly became a Recruiting Manager for Hawthorn in 2020, then Director of Coaching at De La Salle Old Collegians Amateur Football Club from 2021-23. And is currently Director of Coaching at Old Haileybury AFC.
