= Jarrod Pickett =

Australian rules footballer

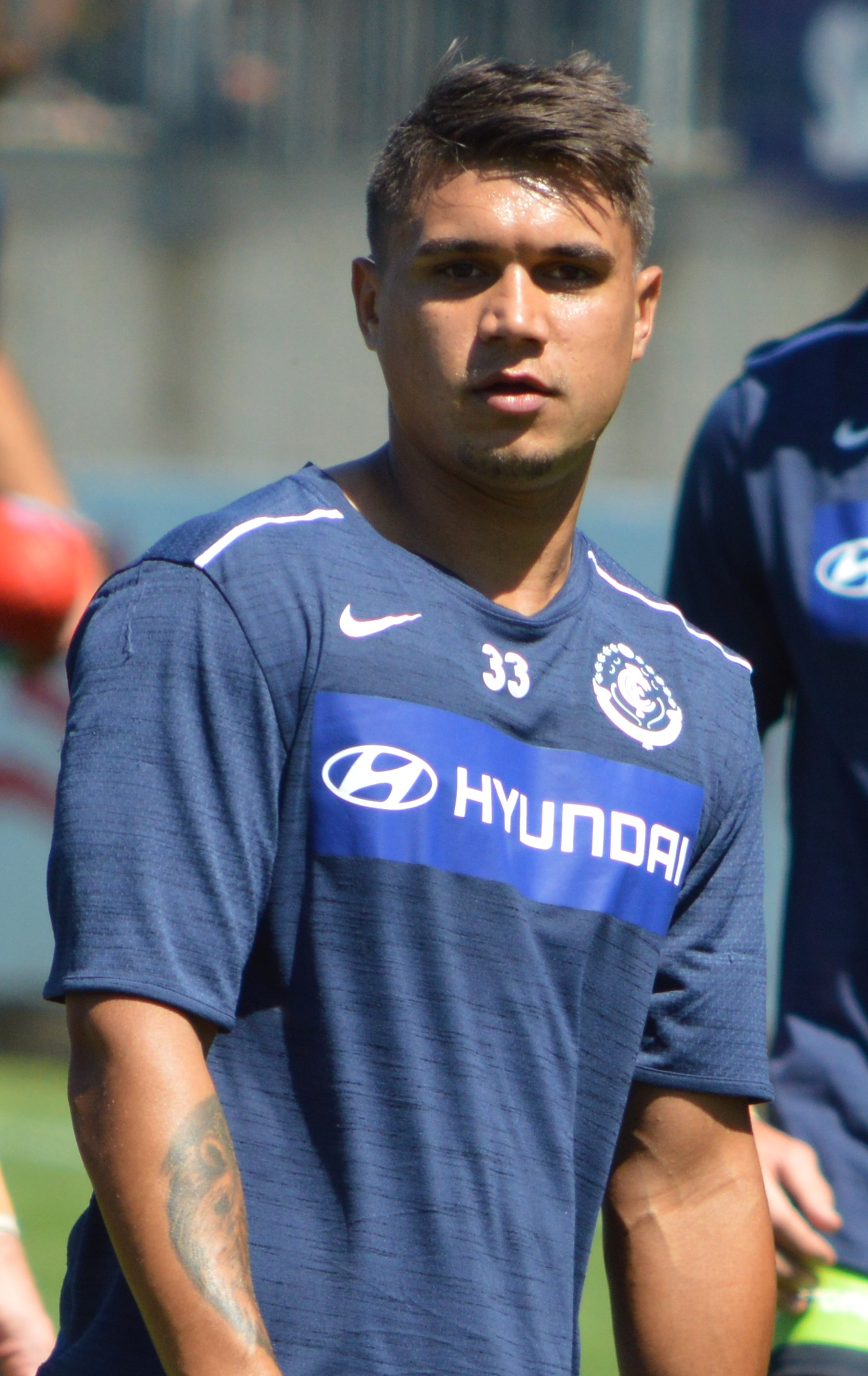
- Pickett warming-up for Carlton in March 2017

Personal information
- Full name: Jarrod Pickett
- Born: 18 August 1996 (age 30)
- Original team: South Fremantle (WAFL)
- Draft: No. 4, 2014 national draft
- Debut: Round 1, 2017, Carlton vs. Richmond, at Melbourne Cricket Ground
- Height: 178 cm (5 ft 10 in)
- Weight: 80 kg (176 lb)
- Position: Forward / midfielder

Club information
- Current club: Carlton
- Number: 33

Playing career^{1}
Years	Club	Games (Goals)
2015–2016	Greater Western Sydney	0 (0)
2017–2019	Carlton	17 (8)
Total		17 (8)

Representative team honours^{2}
Years	Team	Games (Goals)
2015	Indigenous All-Stars	1 (1)
- ^{1} Playing statistics correct to the end of 2018.^{2} Representative statistics correct as of 2015.

Jarrod Pickett (18 August 1996) is a former Australian rules footballer who played for the Carlton Football Club in the Australian Football League (AFL). He was drafted by the Greater Western Sydney Giants with their first selection and fourth overall in the 2014 national draft. After two seasons with the Giants and failing to play a senior match, he was traded to Carlton during the 2016 trade period. He made his debut in the forty-three point loss against Richmond in the opening round of the 2017 season at the Melbourne Cricket Ground. Pickett managed 17 games across the 2017 and 2018 seasons for Carlton, but spent a significant period sidelined with injury in late 2018. On June 11, 2019, Carlton announced that Pickett had been released from his contract.
