= Pat Kerr =

Australian rules footballer

Personal information
- Full name: Patrick Kerr
- Born: 31 July 1998 (age 28)
- Original team: Oakleigh Chargers (NAB League)
- Draft: No. 65, 2016 national draft
- Debut: Round 9, 2018, Carlton vs. Melbourne, at MCG
- Height: 196 cm (6 ft 5 in)
- Weight: 97 kg (214 lb)
- Position: Key forward

Club information
- Current club: St Kevin's

Playing career^{1}
Years	Club	Games (Goals)
2017–2019	Carlton	4 (2)
- ^{1} Playing statistics correct to the end of 2019.

Patrick Kerr (born 31 July 1998) is an Australian rules footballer who currently plays for the St Kevin's Old Boys Football Club in the Victorian Amateur Football Association (VAFA). He previously played for the Carlton Football Club in the Australian Football League (AFL) after being drafted with the 65th pick of the 2016 national draft.

Kerr debuted in Carlton's 109 point loss to the Melbourne Football Club in round 9 of the 2018 season. He played a total of four senior games for the club over two seasons before being delisted at the end of 2019.

Kerr is the grandson of Carlton Hall of Fame player Laurie Kerr who played 149 games for the club in the 1950s and Vivienne Kerr, Carlton's current number 1 female ticket holder.

Kerr played the 2021 season for the Port Melbourne Football Club in the Victorian Football League.
