= Caleb Marchbank =

Australian rules footballer (born 1996)

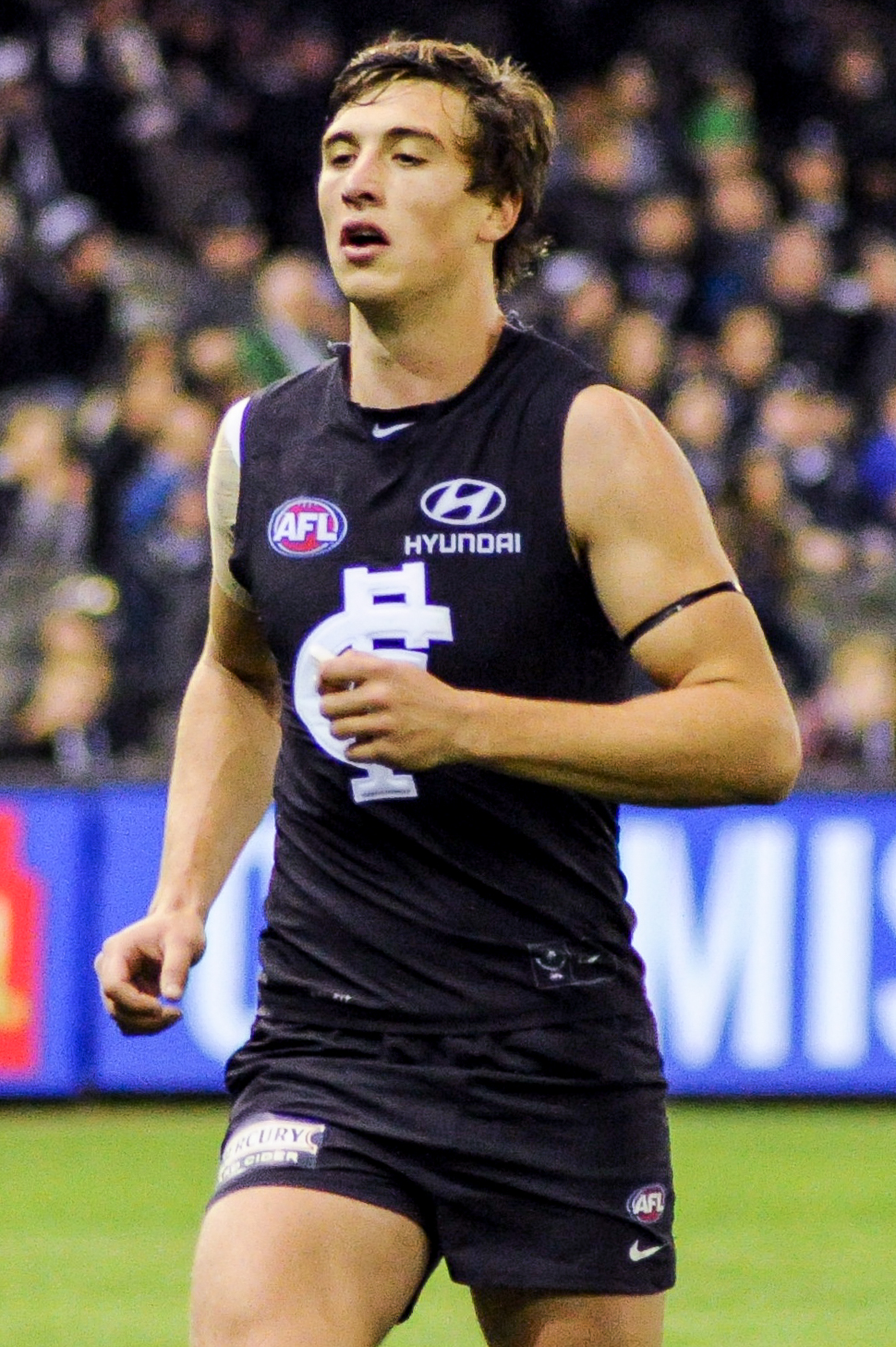
- Marchbank playing in June 2017.

Personal information
- Full name: Caleb Marchbank
- Nickname: Neck
- Born: 7 December 1996 (age 29)
- Original teams: Benalla, Murray Bushrangers (TAC Cup)
- Draft: No. 6, 2014 national draft
- Height: 193 cm (6 ft 4 in)
- Weight: 93 kg (205 lb)
- Position: Key Defender

Playing career
Years	Club	Games (Goals)
2015–2016	Greater Western Sydney	7 (0)
2017–2024	Carlton	56 (0)
Total		63 (0)

Career highlights
- AFL Rising Star nominee: 2017

Caleb Marchbank (born 7 December 1996) is a former professional Australian rules footballer who played for Greater Western Sydney and Carlton in the Australian Football League (AFL). He made his debut against North Melbourne at Spotless Stadium in round 12, 2015. In September 2016, Marchbank requested a trade from Greater Western Sydney and nominated Carlton as his preferred club. He was traded to Carlton in October 2016.

Marchbank was named the 2017 AFL Rising Star nominee for round 6 after gaining 21 disposals and taking 10 marks in the Blues' 19-point win over the Sydney Swans at the Melbourne Cricket Ground.

Marchbank encountered a series of significant injury setbacks throughout his professional career. In 2013, a back injury sidelined him for most of the season after he was kneed in the back in a TAC Cup game. It left him with stress fractures, and kept him out of action for six months. The following year, he tore his right meniscus during his final year in the TAC Cup.

In 2016, after playing in the first two games of the season, Marchbank sustained an ankle syndesmosis injury, followed by a dislocated right shoulder, which forced him to miss the remainder of the year.

His injury woes continued in 2017 when he suffered a hairline fracture in his scapula, causing him to miss four weeks. In 2018, he dealt with recurring ankle injuries that kept him sidelined for more than two months.

Marchbank's injury challenges intensified in 2019 when he was struck in the head by a knee during a marking contest. This incident resulted in a non-displaced fracture of a vertebra at the base of his neck, causing him to miss the final seven weeks of the season.

In 2020, he faced further setbacks with bone bruising in his knee, accompanied by persistent calf injuries, which ultimately ruled him out for the entire season.

The following year, in April 2021, Marchbank ruptured his anterior cruciate ligament (ACL) in his left knee during a Victorian Football League (VFL) practice match against Box Hill, marking another major hurdle in his career. He continued to struggle with injuries, and in June 2022, he underwent surgery to repair a lateral meniscus tear in the same knee, which he had injured while playing against Essendon.

Marchbank played just three senior games in 2024, with illness and a back injury limiting his availability, and was delisted at the end of the season.

== Statistics ==
Legend
G	Goals	K	Kicks	D	Disposals	T	Tackles
B	Behinds	H	Handballs	M	Marks

Season	Team	No.	Games	Totals							Averages (per game)							Votes
Season	Team	No.	Games	G	B	K	H	D	M	T	G	B	K	H	D	M	T	Votes
2015	Greater Western Sydney	34	5	0	0	23	20	43	17	6	0.0	0.0	4.6	4.0	8.6	3.4	1.2	0
2016	Greater Western Sydney	34	2	0	1	12	9	21	5	5	0.0	0.5	6.0	4.5	10.5	2.5	2.5	0
2017	Carlton	22	16	0	1	184	64	248	102	40	0.0	0.1	11.5	4.0	15.5	6.4	2.5	0
2018	Carlton	22	12	0	1	100	60	160	53	24	0.0	0.1	8.3	5.0	13.3	4.4	2.0	0
2019	Carlton	22	13	0	0	119	53	172	65	27	0.0	0.0	9.2	4.1	13.2	5.0	2.1	0
2022	Carlton	22	4	0	0	25	12	37	14	7	0.0	0.0	6.3	3.0	9.3	3.5	1.8	0
2023	Carlton	22	8	0	0	77	34	111	46	16	0.0	0.0	9.6	4.3	13.9	5.8	2.0	0
2024	Carlton	22	3	0	0	10	18	28	3	3	0.0	0.0	3.3	6.0	9.3	1.0	1.0	0
Career			63	0	3	550	270	820	305	128	0.0	0.0	8.7	4.3	13.0	4.8	2.0	0
