= Lachie Plowman =

Australian rules footballer (born 1994)

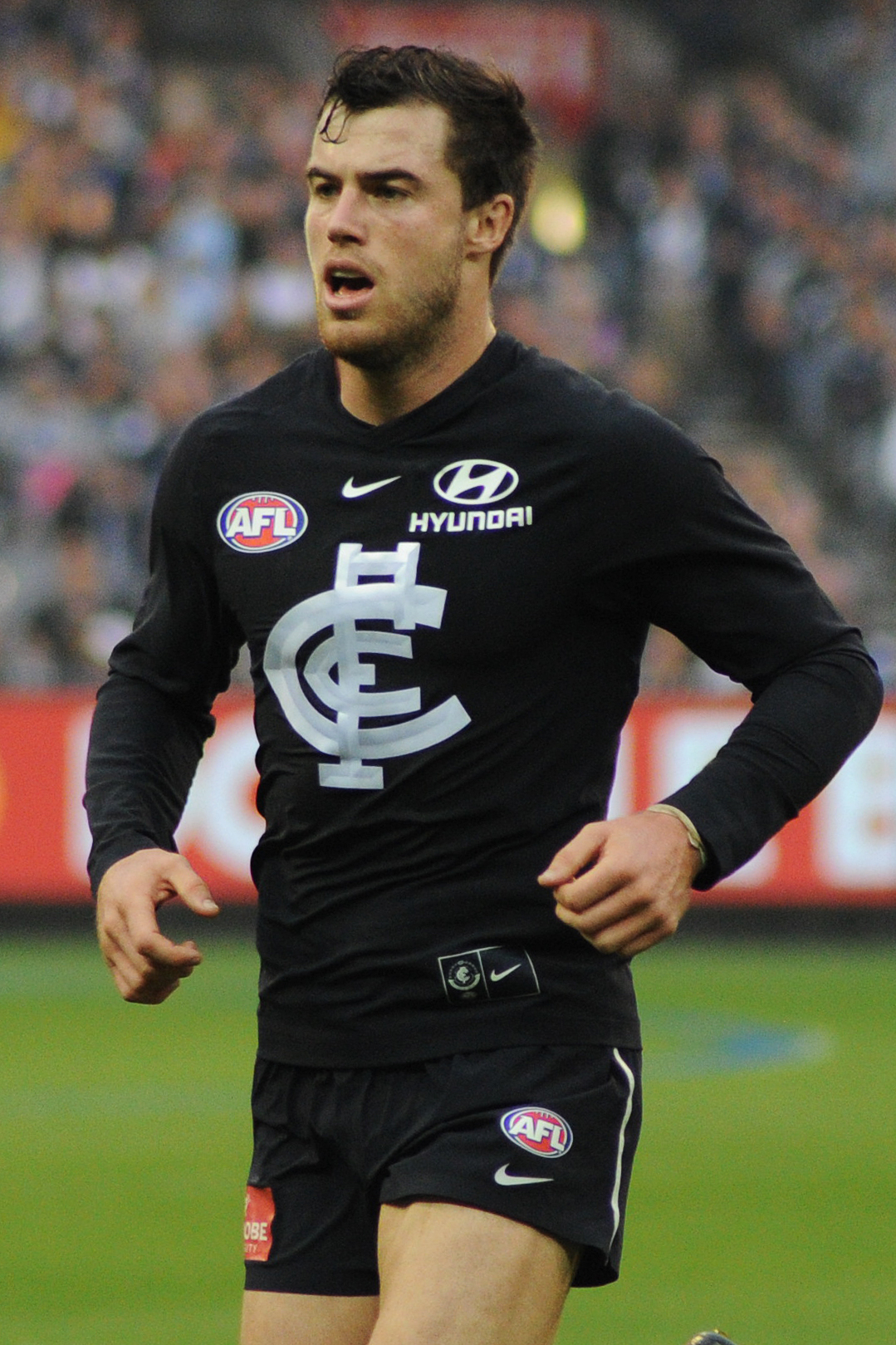
- Plowman playing for Carlton in April 2018

Personal information
- Full name: Lachlan Plowman
- Born: 11 September 1994 (age 32)
- Original team: Calder Cannons (TAC Cup)
- Draft: No. 3, 2012 National Draft, Greater Western Sydney
- Height: 191 cm (6 ft 3 in)
- Weight: 89 kg (196 lb)
- Position: Key defender

Club information
- Current club: Carlton
- Number: 20

Playing career^{1}
Years	Club	Games (Goals)
2013–2015	Greater Western Sydney	20 (1)
2016–2023	Carlton	125 (1)
Total		145 (2)
- ^{1} Playing statistics correct to the end of 2023.

Lachie Plowman (born 11 September 1994) is a former professional Australian rules footballer who played for Carlton and Greater Western Sydney in the Australian Football League (AFL).

Plowman originated in the Macedon Ranges from Sacred Heart College, Kyneton. In 2011 and 2012 he played in the TAC Cup for the Calder Cannons, playing primarily as a tall defender. He was drafted to the AFL by Greater Western Sydney with the third overall selection in the 2012 national draft.

He made his AFL debut in the opening round of the 2013 season. He played eighteen games for Greater Western Sydney over the first two years of his career, winning a regular place in the team in the latter part of 2014. An elbow injury limited him to only two senior games in 2015.

In October 2015, Plowman and three other Giants teammates (Jed Lamb, Andrew Phillips and Liam Sumner) were traded to the Carlton Football Club. He immediately became a regular member of Carlton's best 22, playing 40 of a possible 44 games during his first two years at the Blues. At the end of 2017 he signed another 2 year deal with Carlton.

== Statistics ==
Statistics are correct to the end of round 1, 2020

Legend
G	Goals	K	Kicks	D	Disposals	T	Tackles
B	Behinds	H	Handballs	M	Marks

Season	Team	No.	Games	Totals							Averages (per game)						
Season	Team	No.	Games	G	B	K	H	D	M	T	G	B	K	H	D	M	T
2013	Greater Western Sydney	30	6	1	1	35	21	56	16	6	0.2	0.2	5.8	3.5	9.3	2.7	1
2014	Greater Western Sydney	30	12	0	3	67	47	114	38	29	0.0	0.3	5.6	3.9	9.5	3.2	2.4
2015	Greater Western Sydney	30	2	0	0	11	25	36	5	4	0.0	0.0	5.5	12.5	18.0	2.5	2.0
2016	Carlton	20	19	0	0	121	112	233	77	35	0	0	6.4	5.9	12.3	4.1	1.8
2017	Carlton	20	21	0	1	178	123	301	111	42	0.0	0.0	8.5	5.9	14.3	5.3	2.0
2018	Carlton	20	13	0	0	98	57	155	57	17	0.0	0.0	7.5	4.4	11.9	4.4	1.3
2019	Carlton	20	21	0	0	220	85	305	96	48	0.0	0.0	10.5	4.0	14.5	4.6	2.3
2020	Carlton	20	1	0	1	5	2	7	1	0	0.0	1.0	5.0	2.0	7.0	1.0	0.0
Career			95	1	6	735	472	1207	401	181	0.0	0.1	7.7	5.0	12.7	4.2	1.9
