= Cameron Polson =

Australian rules footballer

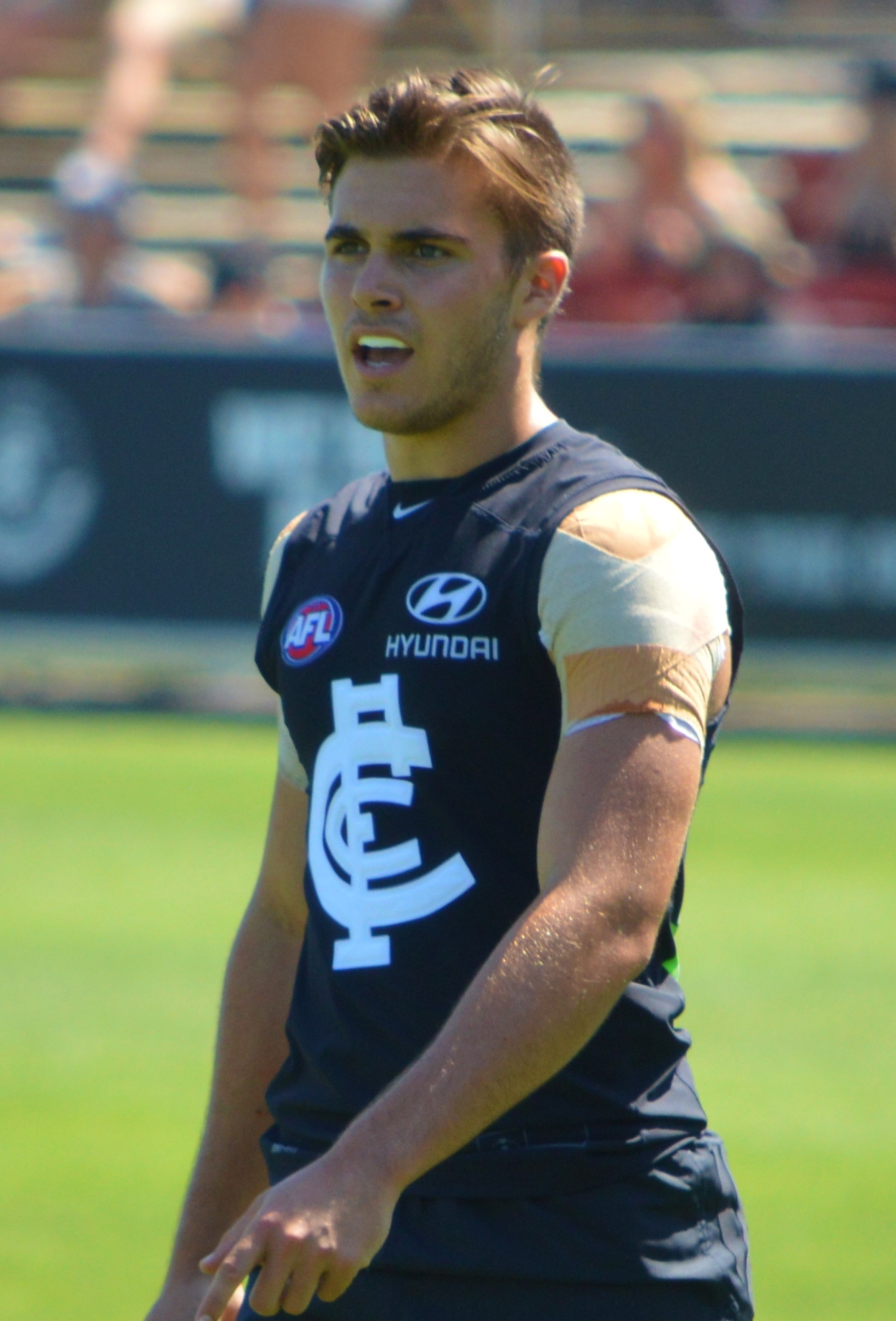
- Polson playing for Carlton in March 2017

Personal information
- Full name: Cameron Polson
- Born: 11 March 1998 (age 28); Hong Kong
- Original team: Sandringham Dragons (TAC Cup)
- Draft: No. 59, 2016 national draft
- Debut: Round 5, 2017, Carlton vs. Port Adelaide, at Adelaide Oval
- Height: 177 cm (5 ft 10 in)
- Weight: 81 kg (179 lb)
- Position: Forward

Playing career^{1}
Years	Club	Games (Goals)
2017–2020	Carlton	19 (4)
- ^{1} Playing statistics correct to the end of end of 2020 season.

Cameron Polson (born 11 March 1998) is a former Australian rules footballer who played for the Carlton Football Club in the Australian Football League (AFL). Polson was born in Hong Kong. He was drafted by Carlton with their fourth selection and fifty-ninth overall in the 2016 national draft.

A midfielder/half forward, Polson made his debut in the ninety point loss against Port Adelaide at the Adelaide Oval in round five of the 2017 season, in what was his only senior match of his debut season. He spent four seasons at Carlton for a total of nineteen games, most of those coming in the latter half of 2018 when he played ten consecutive games. He played only three senior games in each of 2019 and 2020, and was delisted at the end of the 2020 season.
