= Andrew Phillips (footballer, born 1991) =

Australian rules footballer

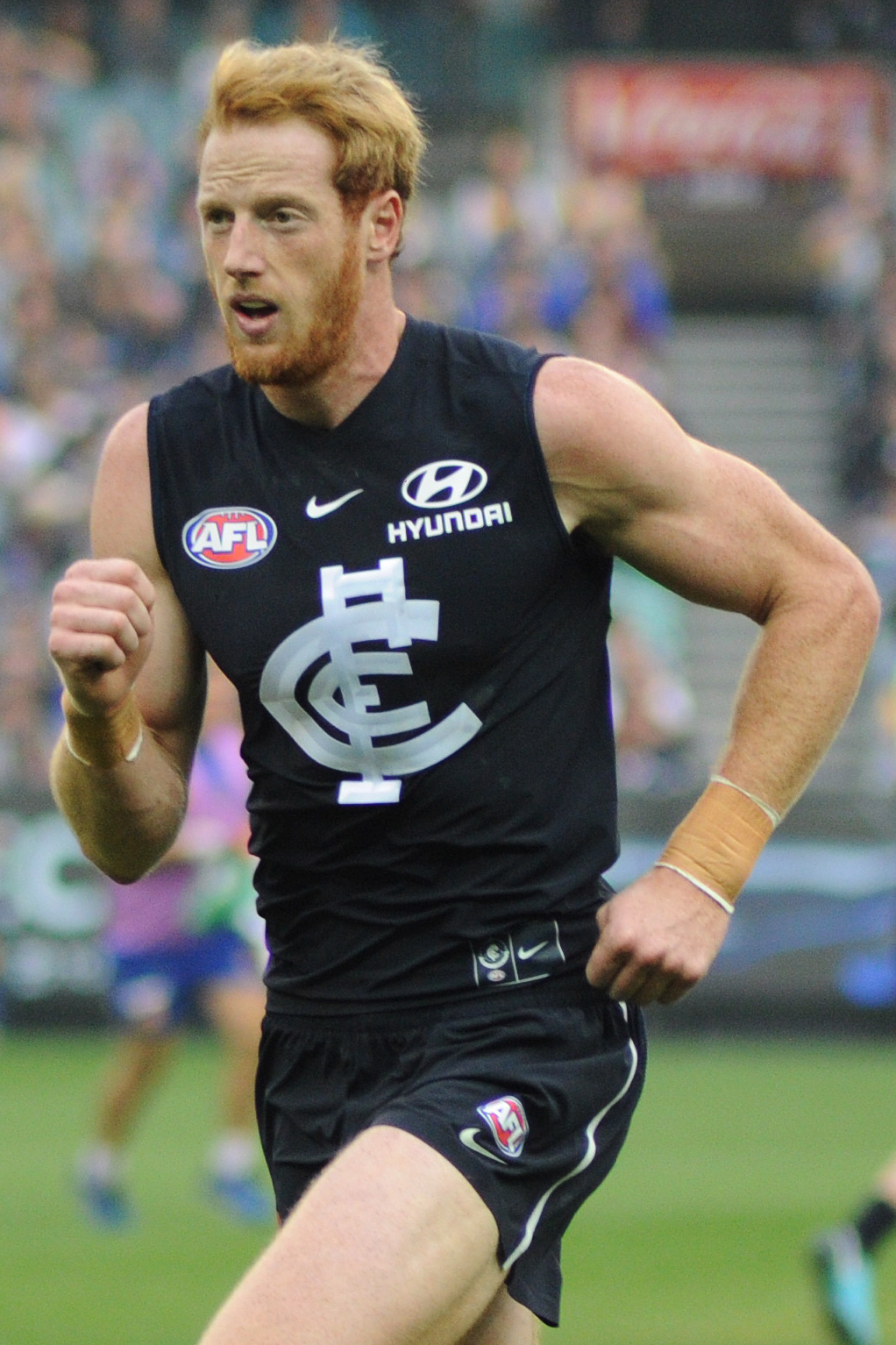
- Phillips playing for Carlton in 2018

Personal information
- Full name: Andrew Phillips
- Born: 3 July 1991 (age 35)
- Original team: Lauderdale Football Club (TFL)
- Draft: No. 4, 2011 rookie draft
- Height: 201 cm (6 ft 7 in)
- Weight: 98 kg (216 lb)
- Position: Ruckman

Club information
- Current club: Essendon
- Number: 34

Playing career^{1}
Years	Club	Games (Goals)
2012–2015	Greater Western Sydney	14 (5)
2016–2019	Carlton	27 (10)
2020–2023	Essendon	41 (13)
Total		82 (28)
- ^{1} Playing statistics correct to the end of 2023.

Andrew Phillips (born 3 July 1991) is a former Australian rules footballer played for the Essendon Football Club in the Australian Football League (AFL). He was drafted by the Greater Western Sydney Giants in the 2011 rookie draft, with pick four. He made his debut in round 7, 2012, against Gold Coast at Manuka Oval, in Greater Western Sydney's first ever AFL win.

In October 2015, Phillips and his other Giants' teammates of Jed Lamb, Lachie Plowman and Liam Sumner were traded to the Carlton Football Club.

Phillips made his Carlton debut in round 1, 2016 against Richmond at the Melbourne Cricket Ground.

Phillips was traded to a third club, Essendon, at the conclusion of the 2019 AFL season.

== Statistics ==
Updated to the end of 2023.

Legend
G	Goals	K	Kicks	D	Disposals	T	Tackles
B	Behinds	H	Handballs	M	Marks	H/O	Hit-outs

Season	Team	No.	Games	Totals								Averages (per game)							
Season	Team	No.	Games	G	B	K	H	D	M	T	H/O	G	B	K	H	D	M	T	H/O
2011	Greater Western Sydney	27	0	—	—	—	—	—	—	—	—	—	—	—	—	—	—	—	—
2012	Greater Western Sydney	27	9	3	2	38	23	61	16	15	91	0.3	0.2	4.2	2.6	6.8	1.8	1.7	10.1
2013	Greater Western Sydney	27	0	—	—	—	—	—	—	—	—	—	—	—	—	—	—	—	—
2014	Greater Western Sydney	27	1	1	0	4	3	7	2	0	6	1.0	0.0	4.0	3.0	7.0	2.0	0.0	6.0
2015	Greater Western Sydney	27	4	1	0	14	18	32	12	7	78	0.3	0.0	3.5	4.5	8.0	3.0	1.8	19.5
2016	Carlton	34	16	6	2	63	46	109	37	39	258	0.4	0.1	3.9	2.9	6.8	2.3	2.4	16.1
2017	Carlton	34	1	0	0	3	2	5	1	3	29	0.0	0.0	3.0	2.0	5.0	1.0	3.0	29.0
2018	Carlton	34	5	3	0	22	12	34	9	10	139	0.6	0.0	4.4	2.4	6.8	1.8	2.0	27.8
2019	Carlton	34	5	1	4	33	24	57	18	17	147	0.2	0.8	6.6	4.8	11.4	3.6	3.4	29.4
2020 (Note: The 2020 season was played with 17 home-and-away matches per team (down from 22) and 16-minute quarters with time on (down from 20-minute quarters with time on) due to the impact of the COVID-19 pandemic.)	Essendon	34	5	0	1	17	18	35	8	13	107	0.0	0.2	3.4	3.6	7.0	1.6	2.6	21.4
2021	Essendon	34	6	4	1	32	30	62	24	23	123	0.7	0.2	5.3	5.0	10.3	4.0	3.8	20.5
2022	Essendon	34	10	4	0	41	17	58	20	25	142	0.4	0.0	4.1	1.7	5.8	2.0	2.5	14.2
2023	Essendon	34	20	5	7	90	62	152	46	48	414	0.3	0.4	4.5	3.1	7.6	2.3	2.4	20.7
Career			82	28	17	357	255	612	193	200	1534	0.3	0.2	4.4	3.1	7.5	2.4	2.4	18.7
