= Jed Lamb =

Australian rules footballer

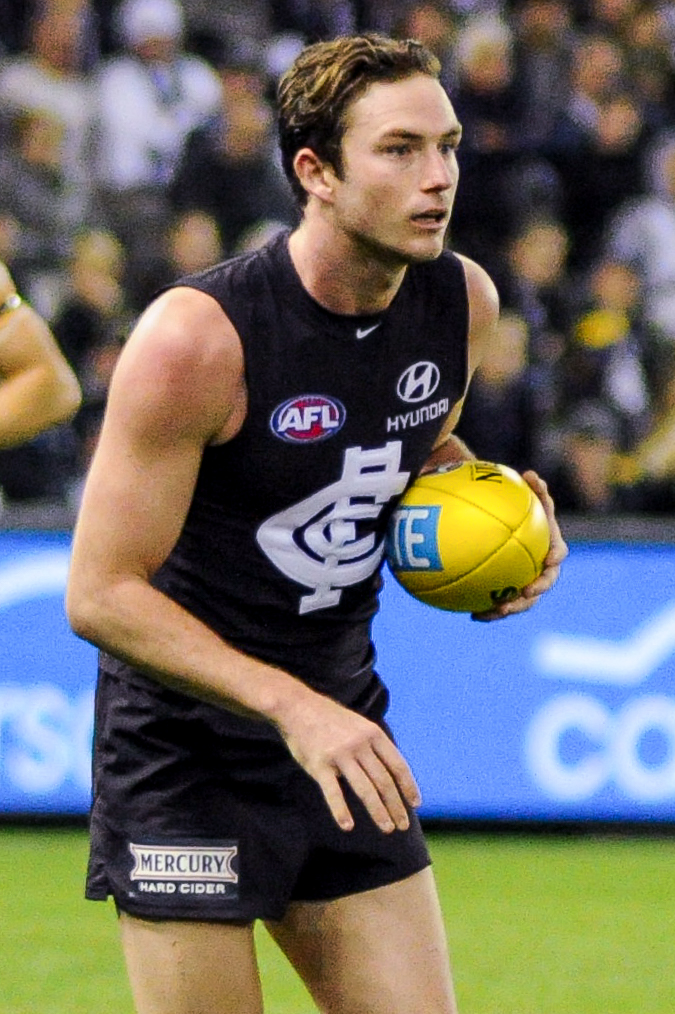
- Lamb playing for Carlton in June 2017

Personal information
- Full name: Jed Lamb
- Born: 19 October 1992 (age 34)
- Original team: Gippsland Power (TAC Cup)
- Draft: No. 21, 2010 national draft
- Debut: Round 6, 2013, Sydney vs. Brisbane Lions, at SCG
- Height: 181 cm (5 ft 11 in)
- Weight: 83 kg (183 lb)
- Position: Midfielder/forward

Playing career^{1}
Years	Club	Games (Goals)
2011–2013	Sydney	12 (9)
2014–2015	Greater Western Sydney	10 (8)
2016–2018	Carlton	44 (26)
Total		66 (43)
- ^{1} Playing statistics correct to the end of 2018.

Jed Lamb (born 19 October 1992) is a former Australian rules footballer who played for the Sydney Swans, Greater Western Sydney Giants and Carlton Football Club in the Australian Football League (AFL).

== Early life ==
One of eight children, Lamb was six years old when his father was murdered by a family friend.

== AFL career ==
He was recruited from the Gippsland Power in the TAC Cup with the 21st selection in the 2010 AFL draft and played with the Sydney Swans from 2011 to 2013. However at the end of 2013 season he left the Swans to play for cross town rivals the Giants in a bid to get regular games.

In October 2015, Lamb and other Giants' teammates of Andrew Phillips, Lachie Plowman and Liam Sumner were traded to Carlton.

Lamb made his debut for the Blues' in round 1, 2016. He kicked a goal with his first kick in a Blues' jumper.

He was delisted at the end of the 2018 season.
