= Carlton Football Club honour roll =

This page is the complete honour roll of the Carlton Football Club, nicknamed the Blues, which is a professional Australian rules football club based in the inner-Melbourne suburb of Carlton North, Victoria.

Founded in 1864, the club's senior men's team has competed in the unaffiliated Victorian football premiership (until 1876), the Victorian Football Association (1877–1896) and the Australian Football League (formerly the Victorian Football League) (since 1897).

Carlton has also fielded teams in several related competitions. Its senior women's team has contested the AFL Women's league since 2017. It has also fielded men's and women's reserves teams and a men's under-19s team during its history.

== Men's seniors ==
Year	Pos.	President	Coach	Captain	Best and fairest	Leading goalkicker
1864	–	R. McFarland	–	Harry Chadwick	–	
1865	–	R. McFarland	–	Harry Chadwick	–	Lanty O'Brien (2)
1866	–	J. Linacre	–	Theophilus Marshall	–	Joe Williams; William Gorman; James Byrne (1)
1867	–	G. Coppin	–	David Adamson	–	William Gorman (2)
1868	–	G. Coppin	–	Jack Conway	–	John Conway; George Kennedy; George Waugh (2)
1869	–	G. Coppin	–	Jack Conway	–	John Conway (3)
1870	3rd	G. Coppin	–	Jack Conway	–	W. Johnson (3)
1871	1st	G. Coppin	–	Jack Conway	–	George Kennedy (2)
1872	2nd	G. Coppin	–	Jack Donovan	–	Jack Donovan (7)
1873	1st	J. Walls	–	George Kennedy	–	Bill Dalton (3)
1874	1st	R. Robertson	–	Jack Donovan	–	Billy Dedman (14)
1875	1st	R. Robertson	–	Harry Guy	–	Billy Dedman (13)
1876	2nd	R. Robertson	–	Jack Gardiner	–	Billy Dedman (18)
1877	1st	R. Robertson	–	Jack Gardiner	–	Loch Bracken (11)
1878	3rd	R. Robertson	–	Jack Gardiner	–	George Coulthard (18)
1879	2nd	R. Robertson	–	Jack Gardiner	–	George Coulthard (21)
1880	3rd	R. Robertson	–	George Robertson	–	George Coulthard (21)
1881	3rd	R. Robertson	–	George Robertson	–	Eddy Brookes (20)
1882	4th	R. Robertson	–	William Goer	–	George Coulthard (14)
1883	3rd	R. Robertson	–	Dick Frayne	–	Jack Baker (19)
1884	6th	R. Robertson	–	Jack Baker	–	Sam Bloomfield (10)
1885	4th	R. Robertson	–	Jack Baker	–	Jack Baker (20)
1886	3rd	A. Gillespie	–	Sam Bloomfield	–	Tommy Leydin (22)
1887	1st	A. Gillespie	–	Tom Leydin	–	W. Green (28)
1888	4th	A. Gillespie	–	Tom Leydin	–	W. Green (22)
1889	2nd	A. Gillespie	–	Tom Leydin	–	W. Green (29)
1890	2nd	A. Gillespie	–	Bill Strickland	–	Peter Williams (20)
1891	2nd	A. Gillespie	–	Jack Lorraine	–	[data missing]
1892	5th	A. Gillespie	–	Bill Walton	–	Jack Geddes (15)
1893	8th	A. Gillespie	–	Danny Hutchinson	–	Frank McDonald (22)
1894	10th	A. Gillespie	–	Peter Williams	–	Jack Leith (14)
1895	11th	F. B. Bromby	–	Tom Blake	–	Herbert Loel (7)
1896	12th	A.H. Shaw	–	Tom Blake	–	Wally O'Cock (12)
1897	7th	A.H. Shaw	-	Jimmy Aitken	–	Wally O'Cock (13)
1898	7th	A.H. Shaw	-	Ernie Walton	–	Tommy O'Day (8)
1899	7th	A.H. Shaw	-	Ernie Walton	–	Harry Thompson (8)
1900	7th	A.H. Shaw	-	Will Stuckey	–	Joe Sullivan (18)
1901	7th	Robert Heatley	–	Will Stuckey	–	Joe Sullivan (14)
1902	6th	Robert Heatley	Jack Worrall	Joe McShane	–	Fred Webber (11)
1903	3rd	Robert Heatley	Jack Worrall	Joe McShane	–	Joe Sullivan (27)
1904	2nd	Henry Bourne Higgins	Jack Worrall	Joe McShane	–	Mick Grace (26)
1905	3rd	W.F. Evans	Jack Worrall	Jim Flynn	–	Frank Caine (25)
1906	1st	W.F. Evans	Jack Worrall	Jim Flynn	–	Mick Grace (50)
1907	1st	J. Urquhart	Jack Worrall	Jim Flynn	–	Frank Caine (32)
1908	1st	J. Urquhart	Jack Worrall	Fred Elliott	–	Vin Gardiner (34)
1909	2nd	J. Urquhart	Jack Worrall	Fred Elliott	–	George Topping (36)
1910	2nd	J. McInerney	Fred Elliott	Fred Elliott	–	Vin Gardiner (42)
1911	4th	J. McInerney	Fred Elliott	Fred Elliott	–	Vin Gardiner (47)
1912	3rd	D. Bell	Norman Clark	Jack Wells	–	Vin Gardiner (47)
1913	6th	D. Bell	Jack Wells	Jack Wells	–	Vin Gardiner (27)
1914	1st	Jack Gardiner	Norman Clark	Billy Dick	–	Bill Cook (27)
1915	1st	Jack Gardiner	Norman Clark	Billy Dick	–	Herb Burleigh (46)
1916	2nd	Jack Gardiner	Norman Clark	Billy Dick	–	Vin Gardiner (44)
1917	3rd	Jack Gardiner	Norman Clark	Billy Dick	–	Billy Dick (22)
1918	3rd	Jack Gardiner	Norman Clark	Rod McGregor	–	Ern Cowley (35)
1919	4th	Jack Gardiner	Viv Valentine	Charlie Fisher	–	Charlie Fisher (36)
1920	3rd	Jack Gardiner	Norman Clark	Paddy O'Brien	–	Horrie Clover (48)
1921	2nd	Jack Gardiner	Norman Clark	Gordon Green	–	Horrie Clover (58)
1922	4th	Jack Gardiner	Norman Clark	Ernie Jamieson, Horrie Clover	–	Horrie Clover (56)
1923	7th	Jack Gardiner	Horrie Clover	Horrie Clover	–	Horrie Clover (28)
1924	7th	Jack Gardiner	Percy Parratt	Paddy O'Brien	–	Alex Duncan (27)
1925	9th	David Young	Paddy O'Brien	Jim Caldwell	–	Harvey Dunn (35)
1926	6th	David Young	Ray Brew	Ray Brew	–	Horrie Clover (38)
1927	3rd	David Young	Horrie Clover	Horrie Clover	–	Harold Carter (33)
1928	4th	David Young	Ray Brew	Ray Brew	–	Horrie Clover (41)
1929	3rd	Dave Crone	Dan Minogue	Ray Brew	Horrie Clover	Harry Vallence (64)
1930	3rd	Dave Crone	Dan Minogue	Ray Brew	–	Les Allen (56)
1931	3rd	Dave Crone	Dan Minogue	Ray Brew	–	Harry Vallence (86)
1932	2nd	Dave Crone	Dan Minogue	Colin Martyn	–	Harry Vallence (97)
1933	4th	Dave Crone	Dan Minogue	Frank Gill	–	Harry Vallence (84)
1934	5th	Dave Crone	Dan Minogue	Maurie Johnson	Mickey Crisp	Mickey Crisp (44)
1935	4th	Dave Crone	Frank Maher	Charlie Davey	Jim Francis	Harry Vallence (66)
1936	4th	Dave Crone	Frank Maher	Jim Francis	Ansell Clarke	Harry Vallence (86)
1937	5th	Dave Crone	Percy Rowe	Ansell Clarke	Don McIntyre	Harry Vallence (39)
1938	1st	Sir Kenneth G.Luke	Brighton Diggins	Brighton Diggins	Mickey Crisp	Harry Vallence (81)
1939	5th	Sir Kenneth G. Luke	Brighton Diggins	Brighton Diggins	Frank Gill	Ken Baxter (65)
1940	5th	Sir Kenneth G. Luke	Brighton Diggins	Brighton Diggins	Jim Francis	Paul Schmidt (55)
1941	3rd	Sir Kenneth G. Luke	Percy Bentley	Jim Francis	Bob Chitty	Paul Schmidt (77)
1942	5th	Sir Kenneth G. Luke	Percy Bentley	Jim Francis	Jim Mooring	Paul Schmidt (47)
1943	4th	Sir Kenneth G. Luke	Percy Bentley	Jim Francis	George Gneil	Jack Wrout (33)
1944	5th	Sir Kenneth G. Luke	Percy Bentley	Jim Francis, Bob Atkinson	Bob Chitty	Jim Mooring (42)
1945	1st	Sir Kenneth G. Luke	Percy Bentley	Bob Chitty	Ron Savage	Lance Collins (49)
1946	6th	Sir Kenneth G. Luke	Percy Bentley	Bob Chitty	Jack Howell	Ken Baxter (46)
1947	1st	Sir Kenneth G. Luke	Percy Bentley	Ern Henfry	Bert Deacon, Ern Henfry	Ken Baxter (42)
1948	6th	Sir Kenneth G. Luke	Percy Bentley	Ern Henfry	Jack Howell	Ken Baxter; Ray Garby (39)
1949	2nd	Sir Kenneth G. Luke	Percy Bentley	Ern Henfry	Ern Henfry	Ken Baxter (46)
1950	8th	Sir Kenneth G. Luke	Percy Bentley	Ern Henfry	Arthur Hodgson	Ken Baxter (43)
1951	7th	Sir Kenneth G. Luke	Percy Bentley	Ern Henfry	Jim Clark	Keith Warburton (48)
1952	4th	Sir Kenneth G. Luke	Percy Bentley	Ern Henfry, Ken Hands	Ollie Grieve	Jack Howell (42)
1953	5th	Sir Kenneth G. Luke	Percy Bentley	Ken Hands	Ken Hands	John Spencer (32)
1954	8th	Sir Kenneth G. Luke	Percy Bentley	Ken Hands	Bill Milroy	Noel O'Brien (45)
1955	7th	Sir Kenneth G. Luke	Percy Bentley	Ken Hands	John James	Noel O'Brien (73)
1956	5th	Horrie Clover	Jim Francis	Ken Hands	Doug Beasy	Kevan Hamilton (22)
1957	4th	Horrie Clover	Jim Francis	Ken Hands	Bruce Comben	Gerald Burke (34)
1958	7th	Lew Holmes	Jim Francis	Bruce Comben	Bruce Comben	John Heathcote (19)
1959	3rd	Lew Holmes	Ken Hands	Bruce Comben	John Nicholls	Sergio Silvagni (40)
1960	7th	Lew Holmes	Ken Hands	Bruce Comben	John James	Leo Brereton (44)
1961	8th	Lew Holmes	Ken Hands	Graham Donaldson	John James	Tom Carroll (54)
1962	2nd	Lew Holmes	Ken Hands	Graham Donaldson	Sergio Silvagni	Tom Carroll (62)
1963	6th	Lew Holmes	Ken Hands	John Nicholls	John Nicholls	Tom Carroll (27)
1964	10th	Lew Holmes	Ken Hands	Sergio Silvagni	Gordon Collis	Ian Nankervis (18)
1965	6th	George Harris	Ron Barassi	Ron Barassi	John Nicholls	Bryan Quirk (29)
1966	6th	George Harris	Ron Barassi	Ron Barassi	John Nicholls	Adrian Gallagher (24)
1967	3rd	George Harris	Ron Barassi	Ron Barassi	John Nicholls	Brian Kekovich (38)
1968	1st	George Harris	Ron Barassi	Ron Barassi, John Nicholls	Sergio Silvagni	Brian Kekovich (59)
1969	2nd	George Harris	Ron Barassi	John Nicholls	Garry Crane	Alex Jesaulenko (66)
1970	1st	George Harris	Ron Barassi	John Nicholls	Adrian Gallagher	Alex Jesaulenko (115)
1971	5th	George Harris	Ron Barassi	John Nicholls	Geoff Southby	Alex Jesaulenko (56)
1972	1st	George Harris	John Nicholls	John Nicholls	Geoff Southby	Greg Kennedy (76)
1973	2nd	George Harris	John Nicholls	John Nicholls	Peter Jones	Brian Walsh (60)
1974	7th	George Harris	John Nicholls, Robert Walls	John Nicholls, Alex Jesaulenko	Bruce Doull	Craig Davis (45)
1975	4th	Ivan Rohrt	John Nicholls	Alex Jesaulenko	Alex Jesaulenko	Robert Walls (59)
1976	3rd	Ivan Rohrt	Ian Thorogood	Alex Jesaulenko	Trevor Keogh	Robert Walls (55)
1977	6th	Ivan Rohrt	Ian Thorogood	Robert Walls	Bruce Doull	Mark Maclure (39)
1978	4th	George Harris	Ian Stewart, Alex Jesaulenko	Robert Walls, Alex Jesaulenko	Trevor Keogh	Rod Galt (49)
1979	1st	George Harris	Alex Jesaulenko	Alex Jesaulenko	Mike Fitzpatrick	Ken Sheldon (53)
1980	4th	Ian Rice	Peter Jones	Mike Fitzpatrick	Bruce Doull	Wayne Johnston (51)
1981	1st	Ian Rice	David Parkin	Mike Fitzpatrick	Ken Hunter	Peter Bosustow (59)
1982	1st	Ian Rice	David Parkin	Mike Fitzpatrick	James Buckley	Ross Ditchburn (61)
1983	5th	John Elliott	David Parkin	Mike Fitzpatrick	Wayne Johnston	Ken Hunter (43)
1984	4th	John Elliott	David Parkin	Wayne Johnston	Bruce Doull	Warren Ralph (55)
1985	5th	John Elliott	David Parkin	Wayne Johnston	Justin Madden	Mark Maclure (48)
1986	2nd	John Elliot	Robert Walls	Mark Maclure	Wayne Johnston, Craig Bradley	Stephen Kernahan (62)
1987	1st	John Elliot	Robert Walls	Stephen Kernahan	Stephen Kernahan	Stephen Kernahan (73)
1988	3rd	John Elliot	Robert Walls	Stephen Kernahan	Craig Bradley	Stephen Kernahan (54)
1989	8th	John Elliot	Robert Walls, Alex Jesaulenko	Stephen Kernahan	Stephen Kernahan	Stephen Kernahan (59)
1990	8th	John Elliot	Alex Jesaulenko	Stephen Kernahan	Stephen Silvagni	Stephen Kernahan (69)
1991	11th	John Elliot	David Parkin	Stephen Kernahan	Justin Madden	Stephen Kernahan (46)
1992	7th	John Elliot	David Parkin	Stephen Kernahan	Stephen Kernahan	Stephen Kernahan (83)
1993	2nd	John Elliot	David Parkin	Stephen Kernahan	Craig Bradley	Stephen Kernahan (68)
1994	5th	John Elliot	David Parkin	Stephen Kernahan	Greg Williams	Stephen Kernahan (82)
1995	1st	John Elliot	David Parkin	Stephen Kernahan	Brett Ratten	Stephen Kernahan (63)
1996	6th	John Elliot	David Parkin	Stephen Kernahan	Stephen Silvagni	Stephen Kernahan (56)
1997	11th	John Elliot	David Parkin	Stephen Kernahan	Brett Ratten	Anthony Koutoufides (28)
1998	11th	John Elliot	David Parkin	Craig Bradley	Fraser Brown	Lance Whitnall (46)
1999	2nd	John Elliot	David Parkin	Craig Bradley	Matthew Allan	Lance Whitnall (55)
2000	3rd	John Elliot	David Parkin	Craig Bradley	Brett Ratten, Scott Camporeale	Lance Whitnall (70)
2001	6th	John Elliot	Wayne Brittain	Craig Bradley	Anthony Koutoufides	Matthew Lappin (49)
2002	16th	John Elliot	Wayne Brittain	Brett Ratten	Corey McKernan	Corey McKernan (40)
2003	15th	Ian Collins	Denis Pagan	Brett Ratten, Andrew McKay	Andrew McKay	Brendan Fevola (63)
2004	11th	Ian Collins	Denis Pagan	Anthony Koutoufides	David Teague	Brendan Fevola (66)
2005	16th	Ian Collins	Denis Pagan	Anthony Koutoufides	Anthony Koutoufides	Brendan Fevola (49)
2006	16th	Ian Collins, Graham Smorgon	Denis Pagan	Anthony Koutoufides	Lance Whitnall	Brendan Fevola (84)
2007	15th	Graham Smorgon, Stephen Kernahan, Richard Pratt	Denis Pagan, Brett Ratten	Lance Whitnall	Andrew Carrazzo	Brendan Fevola (59)
2008	11th	Richard Pratt, Stephen Kernahan	Brett Ratten	Chris Judd	Chris Judd	Brendan Fevola (99)
2009	7th	Stephen Kernahan	Brett Ratten	Chris Judd	Chris Judd	Brendan Fevola (89)
2010	8th	Stephen Kernahan	Brett Ratten	Chris Judd	Chris Judd	Eddie Betts (42)
2011	5th	Stephen Kernahan	Brett Ratten	Chris Judd	Marc Murphy	Andrew Walker (56)
2012	10th	Stephen Kernahan	Brett Ratten	Chris Judd	Heath Scotland	Eddie Betts (48)
2013	6th	Stephen Kernahan	Mick Malthouse	Marc Murphy	Kade Simpson	Jeff Garlett (43)
2014	13th	Stephen Kernahan, Mark LoGiudice	Mick Malthouse	Marc Murphy	Bryce Gibbs	Jarrad Waite (29)
2015	18th	Mark LoGiudice	Mick Malthouse; John Barker	Marc Murphy	Patrick Cripps	Andrejs Everitt (31)
2016	14th	Mark LoGiudice	Brendon Bolton	Marc Murphy	Sam Docherty	Matthew Wright (22)
2017	16th	Mark LoGiudice	Brendon Bolton	Marc Murphy	Marc Murphy	Levi Casboult (34)
2018	18th	Mark LoGiudice	Brendon Bolton	Marc Murphy	Patrick Cripps	Charlie Curnow (34)
2019	16th	Mark LoGiudice	Brendon Bolton; David Teague	Patrick Cripps; Sam Docherty	Patrick Cripps	Harry McKay (26)
2020	11th	Mark LoGiudice	David Teague	Patrick Cripps; Sam Docherty	Jacob Weitering	Harry McKay (21)
2021	13th	Mark LoGiudice; Luke Sayers	David Teague	Patrick Cripps; Sam Docherty	Sam Walsh	Harry McKay (58)
2022	9th	Luke Sayers	Michael Voss	Patrick Cripps	Patrick Cripps	Charlie Curnow (64)
2023	3rd	Luke Sayers	Michael Voss	Patrick Cripps	Jacob Weitering	Charlie Curnow (81)
2024	8th	Luke Sayers	Michael Voss	Patrick Cripps	Patrick Cripps	Charlie Curnow (57)
2025	11th	Robert Priestley	Michael Voss	Patrick Cripps	George Hewett	Charlie Curnow (32)
2026	8th	Robert Priestley	Michael Voss; Josh Fraser	Patrick Cripps		Brodie Kemp (39)

== Women's seniors ==
Carlton AFLW honour roll
Season	Position	Coach	Captain(s)	Best and fairest	Leading goalkicker
2017	4th	Damien Keeping	Lauren Arnell	Brianna Davey	Darcy Vescio (14) ✪
2018	8th	Damien Keeping	Brianna Davey	Katie Loynes & Breann Moody	Tayla Harris (6)
2019	2nd	Daniel Harford	Brianna Davey	Brianna Davey & Maddy Prespakis	Tayla Harris (7)
2020	3rd	Daniel Harford	Kerryn Harrington & Katie Loynes	Maddy Prespakis ★	Georgia Gee & Tayla Harris (8)
2021	7th	Daniel Harford	Kerryn Harrington & Katie Loynes	Darcy Vescio	Darcy Vescio (16) ✪
2022 (S6)	8th	Daniel Harford	Kerryn Harrington	Maddy Prespakis	Courtney Jones (8)
2022 (S7)	14th	Daniel Harford	Kerryn Peterson (née Harrington)	Mimi Hill	Breann Moody (6)
2023	12th	Mathew Buck	Kerryn Peterson	Breann Moody	Mia Austin (11)
2024	14th	Mathew Buck	Kerryn Peterson	Keeley Sherar	Mia Austin, Breann Moody & Keeley Skepper (5)
2025	4th	Mathew Buck	Abbie McKay	Dayna Finn	Sophie McKay (18)
2026		Mathew Buck	Abbie McKay		

== Men's reserves ==
Carlton reserves honour roll
Season	Position	Coach	Captain(s)	Best and fairest	Leading goalkicker
2002 VFL season	9th	Ross Lyon	Tim Fleming	Tim Fleming	
Reserves affiliation with Northern Bullants/Blues
2021	12th	Daniel O'Keeffe	Ryley Stoddart/Matt Shannon	Ben Crocker	Ben Crocker (29)
2022	6th	Daniel O'Keeffe	Matt Shannon	Paddy Dow	Ben Crocker (38)
2023	6th	Luke Power	Ben Crocker	Jaxon Binns	Ned Cahill/Ben Ronke (28)
2024	19th	Luke Power	Lachie Young/Lachie Swaley	Liam McMahon	Liam McMahon (45)
2025	13th	Luke Power	Heath Ramshaw/Liam McMahon	Ethan Phillips	Harry Lemmey (31)
2026	9th	Damian Truslove	Rotating captains	Lachie Fogarty	Hudson O'Keeffe (22)

== VFL Women's team ==
Carlton VFLW honour roll
Season	Final position	Coach	Captain	Best and fairest	Leading goal kicker
2018	7th	Shannon McFerran	Kristi Harvey	Darcy Vescio	Darcy Vescio (26)
2019	12th	Shannon McFerran	Natalie Plane & Megan Neill	Gemma Wright	Bryannen Gurr (7)
2020	Season cancelled due to the COVID-19 pandemic				
2021	8th	Luke O’Shannessy	Ally Bild	Akayla Peterson	Steph Lawrence (14)
2022	9th	Tom Stafford	Ally Bild	Millie Klingbeil	Steph Lawrence (10)
2023	4th	Tom Stafford	Christina Bernardi	Maddie Di Cosmo & Ashlee Thorneycroft	Christina Bernardi (10)
2024	10th	Glenn Strachan	Octavia Di Donato/Eliza Wood	Eliza Wood	Sophia McCarthy (9)
2025	10th	Aasta O'Connor	Octavia Di Donato	Amy Trindade	Lucy Burke (10)
2026	5th	Aasta O'Connor	Grace Master/Steph Demeo		Sophia McCarthy (15)

Source: Club historical data and VFLW stats
