= List of Carlton Football Club captains =

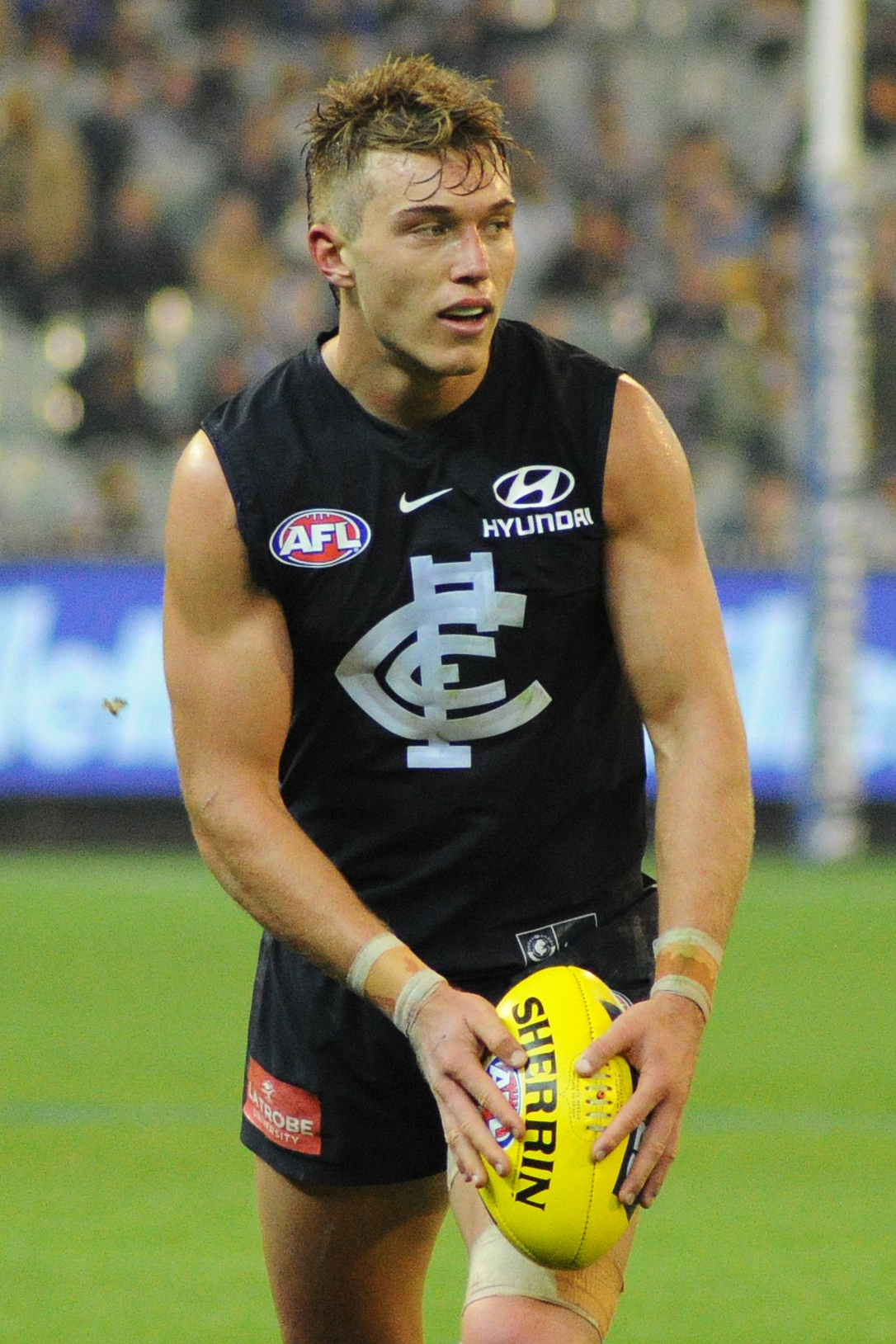
Patrick Cripps (pictured here in 2018) is the current captain of Carlton

This is a list of all captains of the Carlton Football Club, an Australian rules football club in the Australian Football League and AFL Women's.

== VFL/AFL ==
Years	Captain(s)
1897	Jimmy Aitken
1898–1899	Ernie Walton
1900–1901	Will Stuckey
1902–1904	Joe McShane
1905–1907	Jim Flynn
1908–1911	Fred Elliott
1912–1913	Jack Wells
1914–1917	Billy Dick
1918	Rod McGregor
1919	Charlie Fisher
1920	Paddy O'Brien
1921	Gordon Green
1922–1923	Horrie Clover
1924	Paddy O'Brien
1925	Maurie Beasy
1925–1926	Ray Brew
1927	Horrie Clover
1928–1931	Ray Brew
1932	Colin Martyn
1933	Frank Gill
1934	Maurie Johnson
1935	Charlie Davey
1936	Jim Francis
1937	Ansell Clarke
1938–1940	Brighton Diggins
1941–1943	Jim Francis
1944	Jim Francis; Bob Atkinson
1945–1946	Bob Chitty
1947–1951	Ern Henfry
1952	Ern Henfry; Ken Hands
1958–1960	Bruce Comben
1961–1962	Graham Donaldson
1963	John Nicholls
1964	Sergio Silvagni
1965–1967	Ron Barassi
1968	Ron Barassi; John Nicholls
1969–1973	John Nicholls
1974	John Nicholls; Alex Jesaulenko
1975–1976	Alex Jesaulenko
1977	Robert Walls
1978	Robert Walls; Alex Jesaulenko
1979	Alex Jesaulenko
1980–1983	Mike Fitzpatrick
1984–1985	Wayne Johnston
1986	Mark Maclure
1987–1997	Stephen Kernahan
1998–2001	Craig Bradley
2002	Brett Ratten
2003	Brett Ratten; Andrew McKay
2004–2006	Anthony Koutoufides
2007	Lance Whitnall
2008–2012	Chris Judd
2013–2018	Marc Murphy
2019–2021	Patrick Cripps; Sam Docherty
2022–present	Patrick Cripps

== AFL Women's ==
Dates	Captain(s)
2017	Lauren Arnell
2018–2019	Brianna Davey
2020–2021	Kerryn Harrington; Katie Loynes
2022 (S6)–2024	Kerryn Harrington
2025-	Abbie McKay
