= 2016 Carlton Football Club season =

Carlton Football Club
2016 season
- President: Mark LoGiudice
- Coach: Brendon Bolton
- Captain: Marc Murphy
- Home grounds: Melbourne Cricket Ground (Training and administrative: Ikon Park)
- AFL season: 14th (7–15–0)
- John Nicholls Medal: Sam Docherty
- Leading goalkicker: Matthew Wright (22)
- Club membership: 50,130

The 2016 Carlton Football Club season was the Carlton Football Club's 153rd season of competition, and 120th as a member of the Australian Football League. Under new senior coach Brendon Bolton, the club finished fourteenth out of eighteen teams in the 2016 AFL season with a 7–15 record.

== Club summary ==
The 2016 AFL season was the 120th season of the VFL/AFL competition since its inception in 1897; and, having competed in every season, it was also the 120th season contested by the Carlton Football Club. Carlton's primary home ground continued to be the Melbourne Cricket Ground, with the club playing six home matches there and five at Etihad Stadium; traditional home ground Ikon Park continued to serve as the training and administrative base. The club's two joint major sponsors were car manufacturer Hyundai, which has sponsored the club since 2008, and job seekers' service provider CareerOne, newly signed in 2016 to a two-season deal; the club's six-year association with confectionery company Mars came to an end at the end of the 2015 season. Carlton continued its alignment with the Northern Blues in the Victorian Football League, allowing Carlton-listed players to play with the Northern Blues when not selected in AFL matches.

The club faced a financially challenging schedule, with no matches in the most lucrative Friday night timeslot following poor performances in 2015. The club's membership was 50,130, a 6% increase from 2015. The club's operating profit for the season was $1.1 million, with a net deficit of $765k after depreciation and amortization – an improvement on its $2.7 million net deficit in the 2015 season.

The club made a small alteration to its clash guernsey for 2016, by removing the navy blue panel around the waist of the guernsey and narrowing the widths of other blue panels and features, resulting in an overall whiter design. The design was plain white with navy blue side and shoulder panels, trimmings, monogram and number. A second match day mascot, Navy Nina, was introduced to serve as female counterpart to the established mascot Captain Carlton; as with Captain Carlton, she is a masked, navy-wearing superhero.

In June, Carlton was granted one of four Victorian licences for a team in the AFL's national women's competition, which is planned to be established from the 2017 season. Carlton's was one of the four successful bids among the eight Victorian clubs who applied for licences, with Collingwood, Melbourne and Western Bulldogs the other successful applicants and North Melbourne, Richmond, St Kilda and Geelong the unsuccessful bidders.

== Senior personnel ==
Mark LoGiudice continued as club president, a role he had held since June 2014. Marc Murphy retained the role of captain for his fourth season in the role, and Kade Simpson remained vice captain; the rest of the seven-man leadership group comprised Patrick Cripps, Ed Curnow, Bryce Gibbs, Andrew Walker and Sam Docherty.

The club's coaching panel underwent significant changes after the 2015 season, following the dismissal of incumbent Mick Malthouse after Round 8, 2015. In August 2015, Hawthorn assistant coach Brendon Bolton was appointed Carlton's new senior coach; the club appointed Bolton to an ongoing staff position, rather than the more typical approach of hiring a senior coach on discrete fixed term contracts, with the caveat that Bolton be paid out for his first three years if dismissed during that time. The majority of the assistant coaching panel was turned over with only John Barker, who had served as caretaker coach in 2015 following Malthouse's dismissal, and Matthew Capuano surviving from the 2015 panel. New additions to the assistant coaching panel were Richmond assistant coach Tim Clarke (midfield), Geelong assistant coach Dale Amos (backline), North Melbourne assistant coach Shane Watson (forward-line), and Gold Coast reserves coach Josh Fraser (development and VFL senior coach). Neil Craig replaced Rob Wiley as director of coaching, development and performance, after having served in a similar role at Essendon.

== Squad for 2016 ==
The following is Carlton's squad for the 2016 season after offseason transfers and drafts.

Statistics are correct as of end of 2015 season. Flags represent the state of origin, i.e. the state in which the player played his Under-18s football.

Senior List
No.	State	Player	Age	AFL Debut	Recruited from	Career (to end 2015)		2016 Player Statistics
No.	State	Player	Age	AFL Debut	Recruited from	Gms	Gls	Gms	Gls	B	D	K	HB	M	T	HO
1	(Victoria (state))	Andrew Walker (lg)	29	2004	Bendigo (U18)	191	130	11	9	8	130	77	53	34	25	4
2	(Victoria (state))	Jack Silvagni	18	2016	Oakleigh (U18)	–	–	8	7	7	76	53	23	26	25	–
3	(Victoria (state))	Marc Murphy (c)	28	2006	Oakleigh (U18)	204	150	10	7	3	205	114	91	38	30	1
4	(South Australia)	Bryce Gibbs (lg)	26	2007	Glenelg	187	102	22	18	12	590	320	270	77	114	50
6	(Victoria (state))	Kade Simpson (vc)	31	2003	Eastern (U18)	242	124	22	3	0	597	383	214	152	54	–
7	(Victoria (state))	Dylan Buckley	22	2013	Northern (U18)	27	7	11	9	8	142	81	61	34	32	–
8	(Victoria (state))	Matthew Kreuzer	26	2008	Northern (U18)	119	65	21	7	8	231	136	95	46	84	429
9	(Western Australia)	Patrick Cripps (lg)	20	2014	East Fremantle	23	6	21	10	14	566	176	390	68	139	36
10	(Victoria (state))	Harry McKay	18	–	Gippsland (U18)	–	–	–	–	–	–	–	–	–	–	–
11	(Victoria (state))	Sam Kerridge	22	2012	Bendigo (U18), Adelaide	27	23	21	6	14	448	210	238	99	70	6
12	(Western Australia)	Blaine Boekhorst	22	2015	Swan Districts	11	5	7	3	3	94	53	41	27	14	–
13	(Victoria (state))	Jed Lamb	23	2013	Gippsland (U18), Sydney, GWS	22	17	15	13	9	186	122	64	54	38	–
14	(Tasmania)	Liam Jones	24	2010	North Hobart, Western Bulldogs	75	75	8	9	7	78	44	34	24	18	–
15	(Victoria (state))	Sam Docherty (lg)	22	2013	Gippsland (U18), Brisbane Lions	48	10	22	1	2	566	359	207	173	57	–
16	(Victoria (state))	Dillon Viojo-Rainbow	19	–	Western (U18)	–	–	–	–	–	–	–	–	–	–	–
17	(New South Wales)	Sam Rowe	28	2013	Murray (U18), Sydney, Norwood	51	13	22	2	1	198	99	99	84	28	24
18	(Victoria (state))	Kristian Jaksch	21	2013	Oakleigh (U18), GWS	13	3	1	0	0	8	7	1	2	2	–
19	(Victoria (state))	Liam Sumner	22	2012	Sandringham (U18), GWS	12	9	16	8	6	150	94	56	38	42	–
20	(Victoria (state))	Lachie Plowman	21	2013	Calder (U18), GWS	20	1	19	0	0	233	121	112	77	35	–
22		Jason Tutt	24	2011	Ainslie, Western Bulldogs	39	26	1	1	0	18	10	8	4	4	–
23	(Victoria (state))	Jacob Weitering	18	2016	Dandenong (U18)	–	–	20	2	0	291	164	127	106	24	–
24	(New South Wales)	Mark Whiley	23	2012	Murray (U18), GWS	20	3	1	0	0	16	8	8	2	1	1
25	(Western Australia)	Clem Smith	19	2015	Perth	7	–	–	–	–	–	–	–	–	–	–
26	(Victoria (state))	Jayden Foster	20	–	Calder (U18)	–	–	–	–	–	–	–	–	–	–	–
27	(Western Australia)	Dennis Armfield	29	2008	Swan Districts	125	57	15	16	10	225	123	102	51	34	–
28	(Victoria (state))	David Cuningham	18	2016	Oakleigh (U18)	–	–	3	0	0	31	14	17	8	16	–
30	(Victoria (state))	Charlie Curnow	18	2016	Geelong (U18)	–	–	6	5	2	60	35	25	18	9	–
31	(Victoria (state))	Matthew Dick	21	2015	Calder (U18), Sydney	6	–	–	–	–	–	–	–	–	–	–
32	(Victoria (state))	Nicholas Graham	21	2013	Gippsland (U18)	16	5	12	2	9	220	118	102	56	59	1
33	(Victoria (state))	Andrejs Everitt	26	2007	Dandenong (U18), Western Bulldogs, Sydney	118	76	13	17	8	180	99	81	67	17	6
34	(Tasmania)	Andrew Phillips	24	2012	Lauderdale, GWS	14	5	16	6	2	109	63	46	37	39	258
35	(Victoria (state))	Ed Curnow (lg)	26	2011	Geelong (U18), Adelaide, Box Hill	88	11	21	5	9	524	275	249	76	147	–
37	(South Australia)	Daniel Gorringe	23	2011	Norwood, Gold Coast	22	7	4	4	3	52	27	25	17	8	36
39	(Victoria (state))	Dale Thomas	28	2006	Gippsland (U18), Collingwood	182	135	18	6	5	333	202	131	77	55	2
40	(Victoria (state))	Michael Jamison	29	2007	North Ballarat (U18, VFL)	145	2	5	0	0	37	18	19	14	10	–
41	(Victoria (state))	Levi Casboult	25	2012	Dandenong (U18)	52	53	20	18	18	191	119	72	107	26	6
42	(Republic of Ireland)	Zach Tuohy	26	2011	Laois GAA	98	34	22	6	5	443	275	168	80	48	1
43	(Western Australia)	Simon White	27	2010	Subiaco	59	10	17	2	2	261	132	129	76	42	2
46	(South Australia)	Matthew Wright	26	2011	North Adelaide, Adelaide	94	63	22	22	10	450	262	188	80	82	–
Rookie List
No.	State	Player	Age	AFL Debut	Recruited from	Career (to end 2015)		2016 Player Statistics
No.	State	Player	Age	AFL Debut	Recruited from	Gms	Gls	Gms	Gls	B	D	K	HB	M	T	HO
21	(Republic of Ireland)	Ciarán Sheehan	25	2014	Cork GAA	4	–	–	–	–	–	–	–	–	–	–
29	(Victoria (state))	Billy Gowers	19	–	Oakleigh (U18)	–	–	–	–	–	–	–	–	–	–	–
36	(South Australia)	Cameron Wood	28	2005	West Adelaide, Brisbane Lions, Collingwood, Williamstown	88	28	–	–	–	–	–	–	–	–	–
38	(Republic of Ireland)	Ciarán Byrne	21	2015	Louth GAA	1	–	11	0	1	184	103	81	48	24	–
45	(Victoria (state))	Andrew Gallucci	21	–	Calder (U18), Williamstown	–	–	–	–	–	–	–	–	–	–	–
47	(Western Australia)	Jesse Glass-McCasker	18	–	Swan Districts	–	–	–	–	–	–	–	–	–	–	–
48	(United States)	Matt Korcheck	24	–	Arizona	–	–	–	–	–	–	–	–	–	–	–
Senior coaching panel
	State	Coach	Coaching position				Carlton Coaching debut		Former clubs as coach
	(Tasmania)	Brendon Bolton	Senior Coach				2016		North Hobart (s), Tasmania (VFL) (s), Clarence (s), Box Hill (s), Hawthorn (a)
	(Victoria (state))	John Barker	Assistant coach (Stoppages)				2011		St Kilda (a), Hawthorn (a)
	(South Australia)	Neil Craig	Director of Coaching, Development and Performance				2016		Norwood (s), Adelaide (s), Melbourne (cs), Essendon (m)
	(Victoria (state))	Tim Clarke	Assistant coach (Midfield)				2016		Richmond (a), Coburg (s), Richmond reserves (s)
	(Victoria (state))	Shane Watson	Assistant coach (Forward-line)				2016		Lower Plenty (s), Sandringham (U18) (a), Eastern (U18) (s), North Melbourne (a)
	(Victoria (state))	Dale Amos	Assistant coach (Back-line)				2016		South Barwon (s), Geelong (a), Geelong reserves (s)
	(Victoria (state))	Matthew Capuano	Development coach				2009
	(Victoria (state))	Josh Fraser	Development coach, Northern Blues senior coach				2016		Gold Coast reserves (s)

- For players: (c) denotes captain, (vc) denotes vice-captain, (dvc) denotes deputy vice-captain, (lg) denotes leadership group.
- For coaches: (s) denotes senior coach, (cs) denotes caretaker senior coach, (a) denotes assistant coach, (d) denotes development coach, (m) denotes managerial or administrative role in a football or coaching department

== Playing list changes ==
The following summarises all player changes which have occurred since the conclusion of the 2015 season. Unless otherwise noted, draft picks refer to selections in the 2015 AFL draft.

=== In ===
Player	Previous club	League	via
(United States) Matt Korcheck	University of Arizona	Pac-12 Basketball	Signed as a Category B International rookie late in the 2015 season.
(Victoria (state)) Sam Kerridge	Adelaide	AFL	AFL Trade Period, with Geelong's second-round draft pick (provisionally No. 28, obtained in the trade for Patrick Dangerfield), in exchange for Troy Menzel.
(Victoria (state)) Jed Lamb	GWS	AFL	AFL Trade Period, with a first-round draft pick (provisionally No. 8), in exchange for Carlton's fifth- and sixth-round draft picks (provisionally No. 77 and 95), Geelong's second-round draft pick (provisionally No. 28, obtained from Adelaide in the trade for Troy Menzel) and Geelong's first-round draft pick in the 2016 National Draft (obtained in exchange for Lachie Henderson).
(Tasmania) Andrew Phillips	GWS	AFL	AFL Trade Period, with a first-round draft pick (provisionally No. 8), in exchange for Carlton's fifth- and sixth-round draft picks (provisionally No. 77 and 95), Geelong's second-round draft pick (provisionally No. 28, obtained from Adelaide in the trade for Troy Menzel) and Geelong's first-round draft pick in the 2016 National Draft (obtained in exchange for Lachie Henderson).
(Victoria (state)) Lachie Plowman	GWS	AFL	AFL Trade Period, with a first-round draft pick (provisionally No. 8), in exchange for Carlton's fifth- and sixth-round draft picks (provisionally No. 77 and 95), Geelong's second-round draft pick (provisionally No. 28, obtained from Adelaide in the trade for Troy Menzel) and Geelong's first-round draft pick in the 2016 National Draft (obtained in exchange for Lachie Henderson).
(Victoria (state)) Liam Sumner	GWS	AFL	AFL Trade Period, with a first-round draft pick (provisionally No. 8), in exchange for Carlton's fifth- and sixth-round draft picks (provisionally No. 77 and 95), Geelong's second-round draft pick (provisionally No. 28, obtained from Adelaide in the trade for Troy Menzel) and Geelong's first-round draft pick in the 2016 National Draft (obtained in exchange for Lachie Henderson).
(South Australia) Daniel Gorringe	Gold Coast	AFL	Signed as a delisted free agent prior to the National Draft.
(Victoria (state)) Jacob Weitering	Dandenong	TAC Cup	AFL National Draft, first round (No. 1 overall)
(Victoria (state)) Harry McKay	Gippsland	TAC Cup	AFL National Draft, first round (No. 10 overall)
(Victoria (state)) Charlie Curnow	Geelong	TAC Cup	AFL National Draft, first round (No. 12 overall)
(Victoria (state)) David Cuningham	Oakleigh	TAC Cup	AFL National Draft, first round (No. 23 overall)
(Victoria (state)) Jack Silvagni	Oakleigh	TAC Cup	AFL National Draft, third round (No. 53 overall) under the father–son rule, after demoting a fourth round selection (from No. 55 to No. 58) to match the bid made by Essendon
(South Australia) Matthew Wright	Adelaide	AFL	Signed as a delisted free agent after the National Draft.
(Western Australia) Jesse Glass-McCasker	Swan Districts	WAFL	AFL Rookie Draft, first round (No. 1 overall)
(Victoria (state)) Andrew Gallucci	Williamstown	VFL	AFL Rookie Draft, second round (No. 19 overall)

=== Out ===
Player	New Club	League	via
(Victoria (state)) Chris Judd			Removed from the list following his retirement in June 2015
(Victoria (state)) Andrew Carrazzo	Field umpiring	VAFA	Retired from playing
(Western Australia) David Ellard	Greensborough	Northern FL	Retired
(Victoria (state)) Matthew Watson	East Fremantle	WAFL	Delisted prior to the trade period
(South Australia) Cameron Giles	Woodville-West Torrens	SANFL	Delisted prior to the trade period
(Western Australia) Blaine Johnson	South Fremantle	WAFL	Delisted from the rookie list prior to the trade period
(Victoria (state)) Fraser Russell	Northern Blues	VFL	Delisted from the rookie list (category B) prior to the trade period
(Victoria (state)) Lachlan Henderson	Geelong	AFL	AFL Trade Period, in exchange for a first-round draft pick in the 2016 National Draft.
(Queensland) Tom Bell	Brisbane Lions	AFL	AFL Trade Period, with a third-round draft pick (provisionally No. 41), in exchange for a second-round draft pick (provisionally No. 21) and a fourth-round draft pick (provisionally No. 60).
(South Australia) Troy Menzel	Adelaide	AFL	AFL Trade Period, in exchange for Sam Kerridge and Geelong's second-round draft pick (provisionally No. 28, obtained in a trade for Patrick Dangerfield).
(Western Australia) Chris Yarran	Richmond	AFL	AFL Trade Period, in exchange for Gold Coast's end-of-first-round compensation draft pick (provisionally No. 19, obtained in a three-way trade involving Port Adelaide).
(Victoria (state)) Robert Warnock			Delisted prior to the national draft
(Victoria (state)) Nick Holman	Central District	SANFL	Delisted prior to the national draft
(Western Australia) Brad Walsh	Peel	WAFL	Delisted from the rookie list prior to the national draft
(Queensland) Tom Fields	South Adelaide	SANFL	Delisted from the rookie list prior to the national draft

=== List management ===
Player	Change
National draft	Carlton applied for a priority draft pick in the national draft, but the request was rejected by the AFL.
National draft	Carlton traded its second-round draft pick (provisionally No. 20), Brisbane's second-round draft pick (provisionally No. 21, obtained in the trade for Tom Bell) and its fourth-round draft pick in the 2016 National Draft in exchange for Western Bulldogs' first-round draft pick (provisionally No. 11) and its third-round draft pick in the 2016 National Draft.
(Victoria (state)) Nick Holman	Received permission to train with Carlton from the beginning of pre-season training in November 2015, but he was not redrafted.
(Victoria (state)) Andrew Walker	Retired from playing following the Round 20 match against St Kilda.
(Victoria (state)) Michael Jamison	Retired from playing following the Round 20 match against St Kilda.

== Season summary ==
=== Pre-season matches ===
The club's three scheduled pre-season matches were played as part of the 2016 NAB Challenge series.

**Rd**	**Date and local time**	**Opponent**	**Scores** (Carlton's scores indicated in **bold**)			**Venue**	**Attendance**
**Rd**	**Date and local time**	**Opponent**	Home	Away	Result	**Venue**	**Attendance**
1	Thursday, 18 February (7:10 pm)	Hawthorn	0.8.5 (53)	**0.4.8 (32)**	Lost by 21 points	Aurora Stadium (A)	9,181
2	Sunday, 28 February (2:05 pm)	Essendon	**1.3.8 (35)**	1.13.8 (95)	Lost by 60 points	Ikon Park (H)	18,718
3	Friday, 11 March (5:50 pm)	Sydney	**1.8.12 (69)**	0.14.7 (91)	Lost by 22 points	Etihad Stadium (H)	6,804

=== Home and away season ===
Following its 2015 wooden spoon and the loss of some senior players to trades and free agency over the offseason, expectations on the club's 2016 performance were low – with some pundits even predicting that Carlton would perform worse than an Essendon team missing twelve of its best twenty-two players due to suspensions for using illicit substances during the 2012 season. Nevertheless, the club improved significantly on its 2015 performances to finish with seven wins, three more than the previous season.

The highlight of the club's season was the seven-round stretch between Rounds 5 and 11, in which it won six of seven games, including an upset win against eventual third-placed team Geelong, which had the team sitting in a season-high tenth place with a 6–5 record. However, the club had the worst record in the league in the second half of the year, winning only one of eleven games; and although it impressed with narrow losses against eventual finalists West Coast, Sydney and Hawthorn, it also unexpectedly lost matches against the bottom two Brisbane Lions and Essendon. Overall across the season, the club was:

- 1–4 against the top four
- 0–4 against teams ranked fifth to eighth
- 3–4 against teams from ninth to thirteenth
- 3–3 against the bottom four

Altogether, the club's ability to defend and prevent its opponents from scoring improved greatly, conceding 376 points fewer than it had in 2015; but its lack of options in the forward-line was a continuing problem, and the club was the second-lowest scoring team in the league below only the suspension-affected Essendon.

**Rd**	**Date and local time**	**Opponent**	**Scores** (Carlton's scores indicated in **bold**)			**Venue**	**Attendance**	**Ladder** **position**
**Rd**	**Date and local time**	**Opponent**	Home	Away	Result	**Venue**	**Attendance**	**Ladder** **position**
1	Thursday, 24 March (7:25 pm)	Richmond	14.8 (92)	**12.11 (83)**	Lost by 9 points	Melbourne Cricket Ground (A)	75,706	12th
2	Sunday, 3 April (4:40 pm)	Sydney	**10.11 (71)**	20.11 (131)	Lost by 60 points	Etihad Stadium (H)	33,146	15th
3	Saturday, 9 April (5:40 pm)	Gold Coast	13.17 (95)	**5.11 (41)**	Lost by 54 points	Metricon Stadium (A)	13,885	17th
4	Saturday, 16 April (7:25 pm)	Western Bulldogs	**7.7 (49)**	13.7 (85)	Lost by 36 points	Etihad Stadium (H)	27,662	18th
5	Sunday, 24 April (1:20 pm)	Fremantle	9.14 (68)	**10.12 (72)**	Won by 4 points	Domain Stadium (A)	34,796	15th
6	Sunday, 1 May (3:20 pm)	Essendon	**10.12 (72)**	8.9 (57)	Won by 15 points	Melbourne Cricket Ground (H)	43,827	14th
7	Saturday, 7 May (1:45 pm)	Collingwood	12.12 (84)	**15.9 (99)**	Won by 15 points	Melbourne Cricket Ground (A)	60,222	12th
8	Sunday, 15 May (1:10 pm)	Port Adelaide	**14.9 (93)**	13.13 (91)	Won by 2 points	Etihad Stadium (H)	26,924	11th
9	Saturday, 21 May (7:25 pm)	North Melbourne	17.11 (113)	**6.10 (46)**	Lost by 67 points	Etihad Stadium (A)	38,419	12th
10	Sunday, 29 May (1:10 pm)	Geelong	**16.8 (104)**	12.13 (85)	Won by 19 points	Etihad Stadium (H)	33,535	11th
11	Saturday, 4 June (2:10 pm)	Brisbane Lions	**16.6 (102)**	9.10 (64)	Won by 38 points	Etihad Stadium (H)	30,722	10th
12	Sunday, 12 June (1:10 pm)	St Kilda	17.8 (110)	**12.6 (78)**	Lost by 32 points	Etihad Stadium (A)	47,945	11th
13	Bye							11th
14	Saturday, 25 June (4:35 pm)	GWS	18.19 (127)	**9.11 (65)**	Lost by 62 points	Spotless Stadium (A)	10,355	13th
15	Saturday, 2 July (7:25 pm)	Collingwood	**6.9 (45)**	8.9 (57)	Lost by 12 points	Melbourne Cricket Ground (H)	56,157	14th
16	Sunday, 10 July (1:10 pm)	Adelaide	**7.5 (47)**	16.11 (107)	Lost by 60 points	Melbourne Cricket Ground (H)	32,430	14th
17	Sunday, 17 July (1:10 pm)	West Coast	**11.9 (75)**	12.10 (82)	Lost by 7 points	Melbourne Cricket Ground (H)	26,389	14th
18	Saturday, 23 July (1:45 pm)	Sydney	10.14 (74)	**10.8 (68)**	Lost by 6 points	Sydney Cricket Ground (A)	31,765	14th
19	Saturday, 30 July (2:10 pm)	Hawthorn	10.14 (74)	**7.13 (55)**	Lost by 19 points	Aurora Stadium (A)	18,112	15th
20	Sunday, 7 August (1:10 pm)	St Kilda	**7.9 (51)**	19.8 (122)	Lost by 71 points	Melbourne Cricket Ground (H)	37,797	15th
21	Saturday, 13 August (1:45 pm)	Brisbane Lions	15.9 (99)	**13.17 (95)**	Lost by 4 points	Gabba (A)	17,432	15th
22	Sunday, 21 August (1:10 pm)	Melbourne	**11.12 (78)**	7.16 (58)	Won by 20 points	Melbourne Cricket Ground (H)	40,693	14th
23	Saturday, 27 August (2:10 pm)	Essendon	15.13 (103)	**10.19 (79)**	Lost by 24 points	Melbourne Cricket Ground (A)	46,566	14th

== Team records, awards and notes ==
- Round 3 – Carlton's score of 5.11 (41) set a new record as the lowest score ever conceded by Gold Coast in its five-year history in the AFL.
- Round 7 – Carlton won the Peter Mac Cup, the annual perpetual prize in Collingwood home games against Carlton.
- Round 10 – Carlton defeated Geelong for the first time since Round 5, 2010, ending a seven-game losing streak.
- Round 10 – Carlton defeated Geelong at Etihad Stadium for the first time ever, after fourteen consecutive losses dating back to 2002.
- Round 17 – the match between Carlton and West Coast was witnessed by serving Vice President of the United States, Joe Biden, who was hosted and presented a guernsey by Carlton.

== Individual awards and records ==
=== John Nicholls Medal ===
The Carlton Football Club Best and Fairest awards night took place on 9 September. The John Nicholls Medal, for the best and fairest player of the club, as well as several other awards, were presented on the night.

John Nicholls Medal

The winner of the John Nicholls Medal was Sam Docherty, who polled 179 votes to beat vice-captain Kade Simpson (169 votes) and 2015 winner Patrick Cripps (168 votes). It was Docherty's first John Nicholls Medal.

Pos.	Player	Votes
1st	Sam Docherty	179
2nd	Kade Simpson	169
3rd	Patrick Cripps	168
4th	Bryce Gibbs	149
5th	Ed Curnow	115
6th	Sam Rowe	114
6th	Matthew Wright	114
8th	Zach Tuohy	93
9th	Matthew Kreuzer	83
10th	Sam Kerridge	82

Other awards

The following other awards were presented on John Nicholls Medal night:-

- Best First-Year Player – Jacob Weitering
- Best Clubman – Ed Curnow
- Spirit of Carlton Award – Kade Simpson
- Bill Lanyon Inner Blue Ruthless Award – Kade Simpson
- Carltonians Achievement Award – Kade Simpson
- Blues Coterie Most Improved Player – Sam Docherty
- Hyundai MVP Award (the most valuable player as voted by fans in an online poll) – Patrick Cripps

=== Milestones and game records ===
- Round 8 – Kade Simpson played his 250th senior game for the club, the first player to reach the milestone since Anthony Koutoufides in 2006.
- Round 11 – Tom Rockliff (Brisbane Lions) recorded 48 disposals, setting a new record for the most disposals ever recorded by a single player in a match against Carlton. (Statistics recorded since 1965).
- Round 15 – Jack Silvagni, son of Stephen and grandson of Sergio, made his debut for Carlton. The Silvagnis became the first paternal grandfather–father–son trio to represent Carlton; and, with their collective 552nd game, usurped the record of Hawthorn's Kennedy family (John Sr, John Jr and Josh) for most games by a paternal grandfather–father–son trio at a single VFL/AFL club.

=== Season records ===
- Patrick Cripps led the AFL in clearances for the home-and-away season with a total of 185 – the second-highest on record for a home-and-away season behind only Brett Ratten's 1999 season. For the full season including finals, Cripps was second behind Josh Kennedy (Sydney), who had 191 clearances.
- Sam Rowe led the AFL in one-percenters for the home-and-away season with a total of 215.

=== Leading Goalkickers ===
Matthew Wright was Carlton's leading goalkicker for the season in his first season for the club after crossing from Adelaide. His tally of 22 goals was the fewest to lead Carlton's goalkicking since Ian Nankervis' leading tally of 18 goals in 1964.

Player	Goals	Behinds
Matthew Wright	22	6
Levi Casboult	18	18
Bryce Gibbs	18	12
Andrejs Everitt	17	8
Dennis Armfield	16	10

=== Other awards ===
NAB AFL Rising Star

Jacob Weitering finished third for the 2016 NAB AFL Rising Star, polling 26 votes to finish behind Callum Mills (Sydney) and Caleb Daniel (Western Bulldogs). Weitering was nominated for the award after his Round 3 performance against Gold Coast. He was the only Carlton player nominated for the season.

Honorific teams

- All-Australian Team – Kade Simpson and Sam Docherty were both named in the 40-man squad for the All-Australian Team, but neither was selected in the final team.
- 22under22 Team – Jacob Weitering (full back), Sam Docherty (back pocket) and Patrick Cripps (follower) were all named in the 22under22 Team, an All-Australian team with selection limited to players under the age of 22.

AFLPA Awards

For each of the AFLPA awards, one or three Carlton players were nominated by an internal vote of Carlton players; Marc Murphy was also nominated for the Best Captain award by default. Weitering placed third for the best first-year player award.

Leigh Matthews Trophy (Most Valuable Player)

- Sam Docherty (nominated)
- Bryce Gibbs (nominated)
- Kade Simpson (nominated)

Robert Rose Award (Most Courageous Player)

- Kade Simpson (nominated)

Best First Year Player

- Jacob Weitering (third place, 108 votes)

Carlton Football Club Hall of Fame

At the 2016 Carlton Football Club Hall of Fame dinner on 29 April, four players were inducted into the Hall of Fame and one was elevated to Legend Status:

- Sergio Silvagni, who played 239 games for and won two premierships and two best-and-fairests with Carlton between 1958 and 1971, became the thirteenth player elevated to Legend Status;
- Scott Camporeale, who played 233 games for and won one premiership and one best-and-fairest for the club between 1995 and 2005, was inducted;
- Mil Hanna, who played 190 games for and won one premiership with the club between 1986 and 1997, was inducted;
- Ian Robertson, who played 125 games for and won three premierships with the club between 1966 and 1974, was inducted;
- Jack Wrout, who played 130 games for the club between 1936 and 1944 and later served as chairman of selectors, was inducted.

Other

- Senior coach Brendon Bolton was inducted into the Tasmanian Football Hall of Fame for his playing and coaching career at North Launceston, North Hobart, Clarence and the VFL Tasmanian Devils.

== Northern Blues ==
The Carlton Football Club had a full affiliation with the Northern Blues during the 2016 season. It was the fourteenth season of the clubs' affiliation, which had been in place since 2003. Carlton senior- and rookie-listed players who were not selected to play in the Carlton team were eligible to play for either the Northern Blues seniors or reserves team in the Victorian Football League. The club's nine home matches were split with five matches at the VFL club's traditional home ground Preston City Oval, and four matches at Carlton's traditional home ground Ikon Park. The Northern Blues finished 13th out of 15 in the VFL with a record of 6–12.
