= Les Allen (Australian footballer) =

Australian rules footballer (1911–1989)

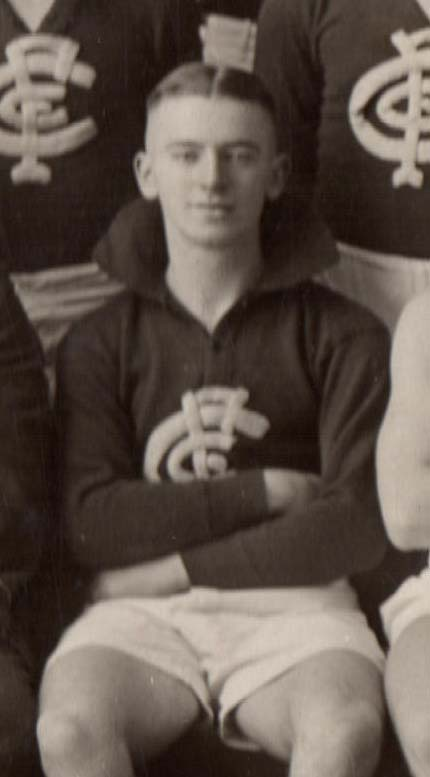
- Allen in 1930

Personal information
- Full name: Leslie Thomas Allen
- Born: 7 March 1911; Wangaratta, Victoria, Australia
- Died: 5 September 1989 (aged 78)
- Original team: Fairfield
- Height: 178 cm (5 ft 10 in)
- Weight: 72 kg (159 lb)

Playing career^{1}
Years	Club	Games (Goals)
1930–1931	Carlton	29 (87)
1932–1934	North Melbourne	41 (103)
Total		70 (190)
- ^{1} Playing statistics correct to the end of 1934.

Leslie Thomas Allen (7 March 1911 – 5 September 1989) was an Australian rules footballer who played with Carlton and North Melbourne in the Victorian Football League (VFL).

== Football ==
Allen, a forward, was originally from Wangaratta.

=== Fairfield (MAFA) ===
He came to Carlton via the Metropolitan Amateur Football Association (MAFA) team, Fairfield Football Club.

=== Carlton (VFL) ===
He kicked 8 goals haul in his second VFL game, against South Melbourne at Princes Park, in round four of the 1930 season. Despite playing from the forward-pocket, he continued to outscore his key forward teammates Horrie Clover and Harry Vallence for the rest of the year, and finished the season as Carlton's leading goal-kicker on 56 goals.

Although he kicked 15 goals in the opening three rounds of the 1931 season, he only kicked 16 goals in his remaining 10 senior games for that season. His overall record, while playing for Carlton was exactly three goals a game.

=== North Melbourne (VFL) ===
At the end of 1931, Allen, who had been unemployed for 18 months, transferred over to North Melbourne, and was immediately given employment (arranged by the North Melbourne committeeman, George Leslie Virgin).

Allen was second in the goal-kicking at North Melbourne to Tom Fitzmaurice in each of his three seasons, with a best of 44 goals in 1933.

At the end of the 1934 season he retired from the VFL, citing ill health. He attempted a comeback in 1937, without success.

=== Brunswick (VFA) ===
Identified as a forward from Fairfield, Allen took part in the 1939 pre-season training at Brunswick, and made the club's final training list for the season.

"Les Allen (Fairfield and Carlton) should prove an acquisition on [Brunswick's] forward line. He co-operated well with the more seasoned players, and, although he has had no previous experience of the throw-pass, proved himself an excellent pupil." — The Sporting Globe, 1 April 1939.

His only senior game for Brunswick was when he was 19th man in the 29 April 1939 match against Northcote; he replaced the injured Bill McGrath during the third quarter.

=== Fairfield (VAFA) ===
In 1939 he was granted a clearance from Brunswick to the Fairfield Football Club in the Victorian Amateur Football Association (VAFA), the D Section premiers in 1938.

== Death ==
He died at Wangaratta on 5 September 1989.
