= John Spencer (Australian footballer) =

Australian rules footballer

Personal information
- Full name: John Spencer
- Born: 7 August 1927
- Died: 3 April 1998 (aged 70)
- Original team: Brunswick
- Height: 168 cm (5 ft 6 in)
- Weight: 73 kg (161 lb)
- Position: Rover

Playing career^{1}
Years	Club	Games (Goals)
1952–54	Carlton	44 (67)
- ^{1} Playing statistics correct to the end of 1954.

John Spencer (7 August 1927 – 3 April 1998) was an Australian rules footballer who played with Carlton in the Victorian Football League (VFL).
