= Ben Crocker =

Australian rules footballer

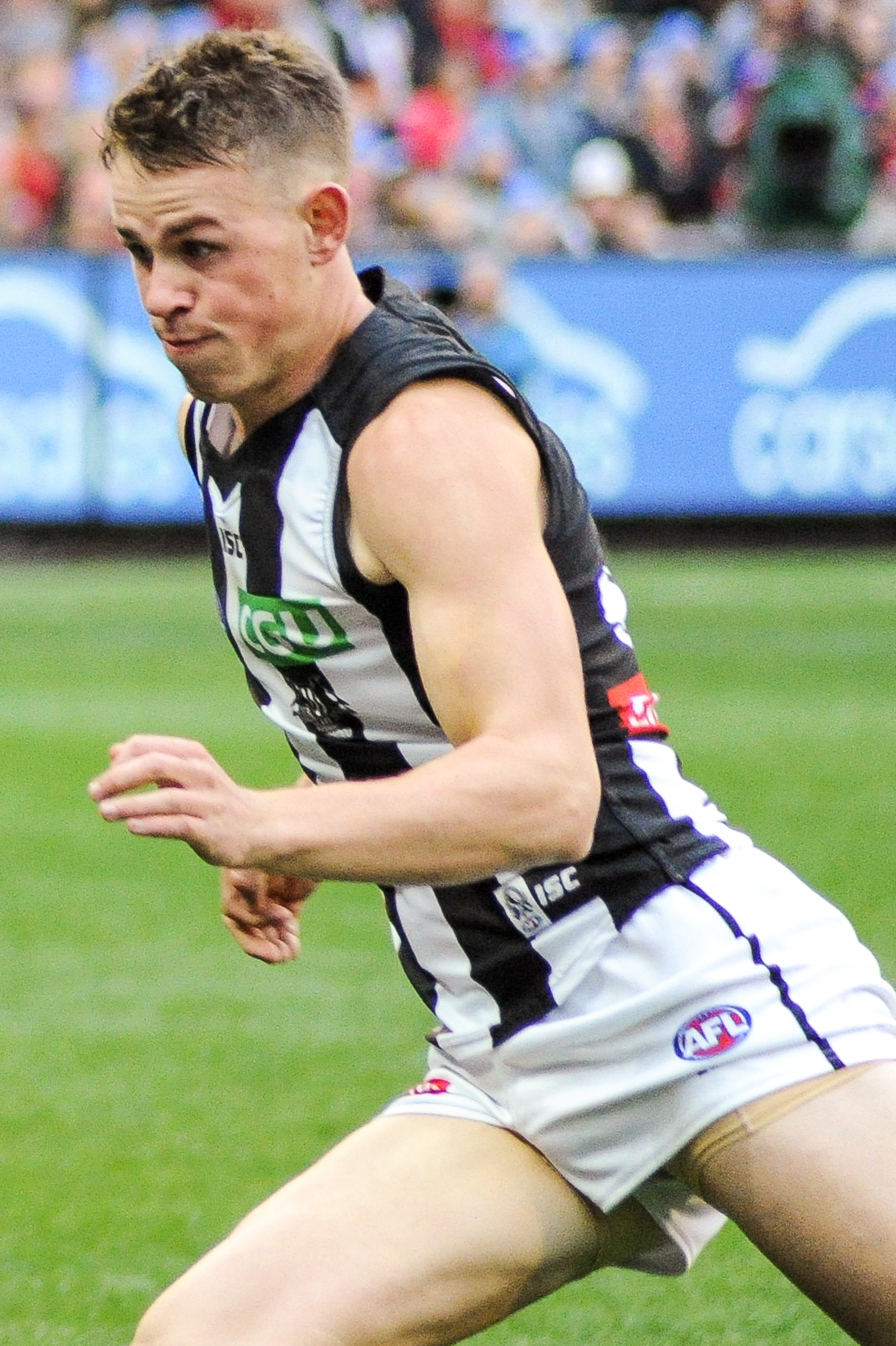
- Crocker playing for Collingwood in June 2017

Personal information
- Full name: Ben Crocker
- Born: 19 February 1997 (age 29)
- Original team: Oakleigh Chargers (TAC Cup)/Carey Grammar
- Draft: 65th pick, 2015 National Draft
- Debut: Round 7, 2016, Collingwood vs. Carlton, at Melbourne Cricket Ground
- Height: 185 cm (6 ft 1 in)
- Weight: 84 kg (185 lb)
- Position: Midfielder / Forward

Playing career^{1}
Years	Club	Games (Goals)
2016-2019	Collingwood	26 (21)
2020	Adelaide	7 (4)
Total		33 (25)
- ^{1} Playing statistics correct to the end of 2020.

Ben Crocker (born 19 February 1997) is a former professional Australian rules footballer who played for the Adelaide Football Club in the Australian Football League (AFL). He also previously played for the Collingwood Football Club.

== State football ==
Crocker played for the Kew Comets and the Canterbury Cobras in the Yarra Junior Football League in his youth. Crocker played and captained the Oakleigh Chargers, leading them to a premiership, kicking a goal against Eastern Ranges in the 2015 TAC Cup season Grand Final. He represented Vic Metro at 2015 AFL Under 18 Championships, serving as vice-captain together with Sam Weideman and Nick O'Kearney under captain Theo Thompson. He kicked a goal in the opening match against Vic Country, where he was named amongst the best players, and kicked goals against South Australia and in the second match against Vic Country. In the final match of the Championships, Crocker kicked three goals against South Australia, including the winning goal.

== AFL career ==
=== Collingwood ===
Crocker was drafted by Collingwood with the 65th pick of the 2015 national draft. After showing good form in the Victorian Football League (VFL), kicking seven goals in four matches and averaging 11 disposals per match, he made his debut for Collingwood's senior team on 7 May 2016 against their arch-rivals Carlton. In October 2019, Crocker was delisted by Collingwood, but was allowed to continue training at the Holden Centre.

=== Adelaide ===
Crocker was given a second chance in November, when he was re-drafted by Adelaide in the 2020 rookie draft. Tyson Goldsack, Crocker's room-mate, former team-mate, and current development coach at Port Adelaide, claimed that he has what it takes to make it in the AFL. Crocker trained and worked hard after arriving in Adelaide, making captain Rory Sloane say he deserves a spot in the best 22. He made his debut for Adelaide in the second round of the 2020 season, against Port Adelaide, kicking a goal.

Crocker was delisted at the end of 2020. He signed for the Carlton reserves in 2021, and played there for three seasons, including as captain in 2023.

== Personal life ==
Crocker grew up as a Collingwood supporter, living next door to former captain Scott Burns. He was educated at Carey Baptist Grammar School. His brother, Sam, was drafted by St Kilda in the 2010 draft, but he was delisted after two years without making a senior appearance. In 2014, Crocker's father, Paul, was diagnosed with early onset dementia, and he became an ambassador for Dementia Australia, helping raise funds.

== Statistics ==
Statistics are correct to the end of 2020 season

Legend
G	Goals	K	Kicks	D	Disposals	T	Tackles
B	Behinds	H	Handballs	M	Marks

Season	Team	No.	Games	Totals							Averages (per game)						
Season	Team	No.	Games	G	B	K	H	D	M	T	G	B	K	H	D	M	T
2016	Collingwood	39	10	10	6	50	41	91	30	13	1.0	0.6	5.0	4.1	9.1	3.0	1.3
2017	Collingwood	39	3	3	2	18	11	29	14	8	1.0	0.7	6.0	3.7	9.7	4.7	2.7
2018	Collingwood	39	10	5	8	74	31	105	42	16	0.5	0.8	7.4	3.1	10.5	4.2	1.6
2019	Collingwood	39	3	3	2	17	6	23	9	9	1.0	0.7	5.7	2.0	7.7	3.0	3.0
2020	Adelaide	20	7	4	5	45	10	55	10	17	0.6	0.7	6.4	1.4	7.8	3.2	2.4
Career			33	25	23	204	99	303	117	63	0.8	0.7	6.2	3.0	9.2	3.0	1.9
