= Marc Murphy (footballer) =

Australian rules footballer (born 1987)

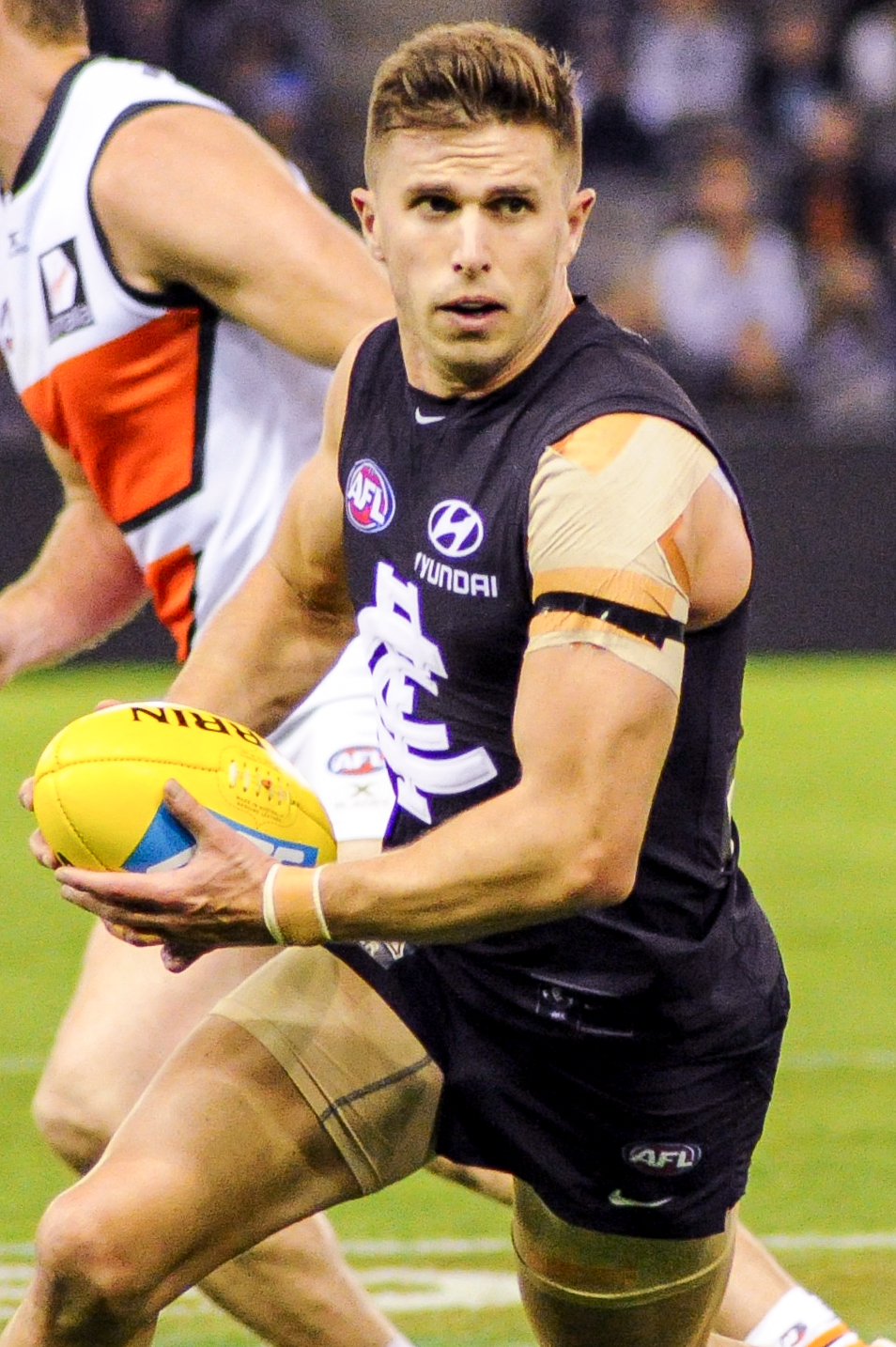
- Murphy playing for Carlton in June 2017

Personal information
- Born: 19 July 1987 (age 39); Melbourne, Victoria
- Original team: Beverley Hills (Vic)/Oakleigh Chargers
- Draft: No. 1, 2005 national draft
- Height: 180 cm (5 ft 11 in)
- Weight: 81 kg (179 lb)
- Position: Midfielder / forward

Playing career^{1}
Years	Club	Games (Goals)
2006–2021	Carlton	300 (197)
- ^{1} Playing statistics correct to the end of 2021.

Career highlights
- AFLCA Champion Player of the Year: 2011; All-Australian team: 2011; 2× John Nicholls Medal: 2011, 2017; Carlton captain: 2013–2018; AFL Rising Star nominee: 2006; AFLPA Best First Year Player Award: 2006; Larke Medal: 2005

Marc Murphy (born 19 July 1987) is a retired Australian rules footballer who played for the Carlton Football Club in the Australian Football League (AFL). He was recruited with the first overall selection in the 2005 AFL draft and served as the captain of Carlton from the 2013 season to 2018. He is the son of John Murphy.

== Early life and junior career ==
Murphy attended Whitefriars College in Donvale. He played for Beverley Hills Junior Football Club and Doncaster Football Club, before playing TAC Cup football with the Oakleigh Chargers. He represented the victorious Vic Metro team at the 2005 AFL Under 18 Championships, winning the Larke Medal as the best player of the tournament.

As the son of John Murphy, a Hall-of-Famer and legend of the Fitzroy Football Club, Marc was eligible to be taken by the Brisbane Lions under the father–son rule. However he exercised his option to decline the offer and nominate for the 2005 AFL National draft as he didn't want to leave Melbourne. Carlton subsequently took him in the draft with the first overall draft pick, a priority pick.

== AFL career ==
=== 2006–2007: Beginnings ===
Murphy made his AFL debut in round 1 of the 2006 season against Melbourne at the Telstra Dome. 17 disposals, 11 kicks and 6 handballs – highlighted by his first career goal – earned him an NAB AFL Rising Star award nomination. Murphy impressed pundits in his first season, and he was an early favourite for the Rising Star award. However, he sustained a season-ending shoulder injury in round 13 against the Brisbane Lions, which effectively ended any chance he had of winning it. Despite playing only twelve full games, Murphy led Carlton in assists for the season. He won Carlton's Best First Year Player award, and was voted by his peers as the AFL Players Association's Best First Year Player.

Murphy was elevated to the eight-man leadership group for the 2007 season. In early 2007, he replicated his good form of 2006, amassing 30 disposals against eventual premiers Geelong in round 2. However, an injury to prime midfielder Nick Stevens after round 3 saw Murphy attract the opposition's best taggers in most games. While his form remained solid, he finished outside the top 10 in the club's John Nicholls Medal.

=== 2008 ===
Murphy added considerable bulk to his frame during the off-season, highlighted in many preseason news articles. He was removed from the leadership group, which was reduced to five players. Murphy benefitted significantly from the return of Nick Stevens and the recruitment of Chris Judd, as they attracted the strongest taggers, giving Murphy more freedom to run. He had breakout games against Port Adelaide in round 11 and against Hawthorn in round 22, picking up a season-high 36 disposals at 81% efficiency. He played his 50th game in round 15 against St Kilda. Murphy capped off a great 2008 season by coming second to Judd in the John Nicholls Medal, and recording 11 votes in the Brownlow Medal.

Murphy was selected for Australia in the 2008 International Rules Series against Ireland. He was one of Australia's best in the first test, kicking 4 overs to assist a late-game comeback by Australia which fell one point short. He scored a goal in the second test by unintentionally tapping the ball into the net from crowded contest.

=== 2009 ===
Murphy continued his form in the 2009 season, establishing himself as one of the elite midfielders in the AFL, and averaging 25.6 disposals per game. He became Carlton's most potent goal-scoring midfielder, setting himself a personal target of averaging a goal a game, and he achieved this with a total of 31 goals from his 23 matches. After becoming a damaging midfielder, he was selected in the All-Australian Squad of 40, but was not selected in the team, and polled 15 Brownlow Medal votes to finish equal 9th. He again finished second in the Best and Fairest award (John Nicholls Medal) behind his captain Chris Judd.

=== 2010 ===
Murphy played his 100th game in Round 21, 2010; in doing so, he, father John (246 games for Fitzroy, South Melbourne and North Melbourne), and grandfather Leo Murphy (132 games for Hawthorn) became the only father–son–grandson combination in league history to each play 100 games.

Murphy missed much of the 2010 pre-season due to hip surgery, and struggled through the first half of the year. However, his second half of the season was exemplary, polling best and fairest votes in every game after Round 14 and ultimately finishing third for the award.

=== 2011 ===
Murphy became one of the league's elite midfielders in 2011. He was named in the All-Australian team for the first time in his career, on the half-forward flank, and won his first John Nicholls Medal for best and fairest player at Carlton. He was also named as the AFL Coaches' Association Champion Player of the Year, and The Age' Player of the Year.

=== 2012 ===
Murphy started the year as strong as he finished 2011, becoming the favourite for the Brownlow Medal before a heavy collision with Patrick Dangerfield in round 8 where he sustained a shoulder injury. He returned in round 16, and from round 17 to 21 was named as the acting captain in the absence of Chris Judd.

=== 2013 ===
Marc was announced Captain of the Carlton Football Club after superstar Chris Judd stepped down. He began leading well, averaging 22 disposals for the season.

=== 2014 ===
In 2014 Marc played a consistent season averaging 24 Disposals in 20 games. He finished second in the John Nicholls Medal.

=== 2015 ===
Marc celebrated his 200th game against the Hawthorn Football Club in round 17 2015. Although the Blues were beaten convincingly, Marc had a match-high 37 Disposals. Marc finished second in the Blues' Best and Fariest by a vote behind young gun Patrick Cripps.

=== 2016 ===
At the end of 2015, it was speculated that Murphy might lose the Carlton captaincy when new coach Brendon Bolton declared that the club was going through a "real reset" which included reviewing the leadership. However early in the 2016 preseason, Murphy was reappointed captain the club again for a 4th straight season. The 2016 campaign started well for Marc until he suffered a season-ending ankle injury against Geelong in round 10.

=== 2017 ===
Marc bounced back from an injury-filled year to produce one of his most impressive to date, averaging over 29 disposals for the second time in his career. He won his second John Nicholls Medal as Carlton's Best and Fairest. His experience and leadership played a vital role in the club's "reset" which is still in progress today.

=== 2018 ===
Even at the age of 30 and after a wooden spoon season, Murphy still expressed his commitment to the football club after signing a contract extension. Murphy had another injury hindered season, only being able to play in 13 games. He once again committed to the team, signing an extension until the end of the 2020 season, proving his loyalty to the club.

=== 2019 ===
Marc Murphy stepped down as captain after his injury plagued 2018 season, giving young leaders Sam Docherty and Patrick Cripps co-captaincy. Murphy still remains in the leadership group, though alongside Ed Curnow and Kade Simpson.

=== 2021 ===
In August 2021, Murphy announced his retirement from his playing career, which came after his 300th and last game against Port Adelaide.

Four months after his retirement in December 2021, Murphy reflected on his playing career at Carlton and stated that “It was definitely the wrong decision to sack Brett Ratten as senior coach and replace him with Mick Malthouse” and Carlton was in great form under Ratten and “stiff” to narrowly lose its semi-final to the West Coast Eagles in the 2011 season". Murphy further added “I just think there’d been so much investment in Ratts and we were progressing really well and unfortunately through circumstance, I think it was too quick to just go ‘nah, we’ll go in another direction’. Essentially you end up having to go backwards before you go up again really. Very rarely will someone come in as a new coach and just go bounce straightaway". “I think the support and the communication needed to be better at that time. I was never one for going upstairs, so to speak, and getting involved in all of that chat. I was dealing with coaches, not necessarily getting involved with CEOs and the rest of it about who appoints people. “Hindsight’s a wonderful thing, but I think it was a bad move”.

Murphy then criticised his former senior coach Malthouse stating "his time at Carlton, I don’t think he was really in it for the right reasons. Then once it turned pear-shaped, it was all about him, unfortunately, at the end and I was left to be thrown at the bus quite a bit". “He was obviously a terrific coach, but unfortunately at Carlton for us and for me and the boys who were there working so hard, it just didn’t work out” and “It was extremely difficult, but Mick was a very autocratic leader. It was all whatever he said basically goes. I could have my input, but I couldn’t get really any traction whatsoever".

== Kabaddi career ==
Murphy signed on to play kabaddi and represent Australia in the inaugural Pro Kabaddi League exhibition event in Melbourne on 28 December 2024.

== Personal life ==
In September 2015, Murphy proposed to longtime girlfriend Jessie Habermann, a model, actor and blogger. They were married in December 2016. Their first child was born in 2018.

Since 2010, Murphy has been an ambassador for the MAD Foundation, a Melbourne non-for-profit organisation helping disabled and disadvantaged young people.

== Statistics ==
Statistics are correct to end of round 22, 2021

Legend
G	Goals	K	Kicks	D	Disposals	T	Tackles
B	Behinds	H	Handballs	M	Marks

Season	Team	No.	Games	Totals							Averages (per game)							Votes
Season	Team	No.	Games	G	B	K	H	D	M	T	G	B	K	H	D	M	T	Votes
2006	Carlton	3	13	8	4	148	86	234	73	27	0.6	0.3	11.4	6.6	18.0	5.6	2.1	2
2007	Carlton	3	22	10	17	264	130	394	91	64	0.5	0.8	12.0	5.9	17.9	4.1	2.9	0
2008	Carlton	3	22	14	11	335	207	542	137	58	0.6	0.5	15.2	9.4	24.6	6.2	2.6	11
2009	Carlton	3	23	31	17	286	302	588	107	89	1.3	0.7	12.4	13.1	25.6	4.7	3.9	15
2010	Carlton	3	22	19	11	278	282	560	90	100	0.9	0.5	12.6	12.8	25.5	4.1	4.5	5
2011	Carlton	3	24	22	13	391	308	699	108	108	0.9	0.5	16.3	12.8	29.1	4.5	4.5	19
2012	Carlton	3	16	11	10	236	184	420	69	63	0.7	0.6	14.8	11.5	26.3	4.3	3.9	11
2013	Carlton	3	23	18	7	284	228	512	87	79	0.8	0.3	12.3	9.9	22.3	3.8	3.4	10
2014	Carlton	3	20	10	9	275	207	482	75	99	0.5	0.5	13.8	10.4	24.1	3.8	5.0	9
2015	Carlton	3	19	7	6	291	219	510	79	65	0.4	0.3	15.3	11.5	26.8	4.2	3.4	12
2016	Carlton	3	10	7	3	114	91	205	38	30	0.7	0.3	11.4	9.1	20.5	3.8	3.0	1
2017	Carlton	3	22	11	9	360	296	656	127	86	0.5	0.4	16.4	13.5	29.8	5.8	3.9	9
2018	Carlton	3	13	5	4	184	154	338	52	52	0.4	0.3	14.2	11.9	26.0	4.8	4.0	2
2019	Carlton	3	19	12	3	279	204	483	88	65	0.6	0.2	14.7	10.7	25.4	4.6	3.4	6
2020	Carlton	3	17	4	7	178	135	313	63	37	0.2	0.4	10.5	7.9	18.4	3.7	2.2	2
2021	Carlton	3	15	8	4	115	76	191	47	24	0.5	0.3	7.7	5.1	12.7	3.1	1.6	0
Career			300	197	135	4018	3109	7127	1341	1046	0.7	0.5	13.4	10.4	23.8	4.5	3.5	112

=== Game highs ===
Game highs correct as of the end of the round 15, 2019.
Stat	Game High	Round	Season	Opponent
Goals	4	R18	2009	North Melbourne
Behinds	3	R4	2007	West Coast Eagles
Kicks	24	R4	2019	Gold Coast
Handballs	24	R4	2015	St Kilda
Disposals	39	R3	2012	Collingwood
Marks	15	R4	2010	Adelaide Crows
Tackles	12	R5	2014	Western Bulldogs
Inside 50s	11	R9	2008	Fremantle
Contested Possessions	24	R4	2015	St Kilda
Clearances	10	R4	2015	St Kilda

== Honours and achievements ==
Individual

- 2x John Nicholls Medal: 2011, 2017
- All-Australian team: 2011
- Australian representative honours in international rules football: 2008
- AFL Coaches' Association (AFLCA) Champion Player of the Year: 2011
- AFL Players Association (AFLPA) Best First Year Player: 2006
- AFL Rising Star nominee: 2006
- Larke Medal: 2005
