= Matthew Wright (Australian footballer) =

Australian rules footballer (born 1989)

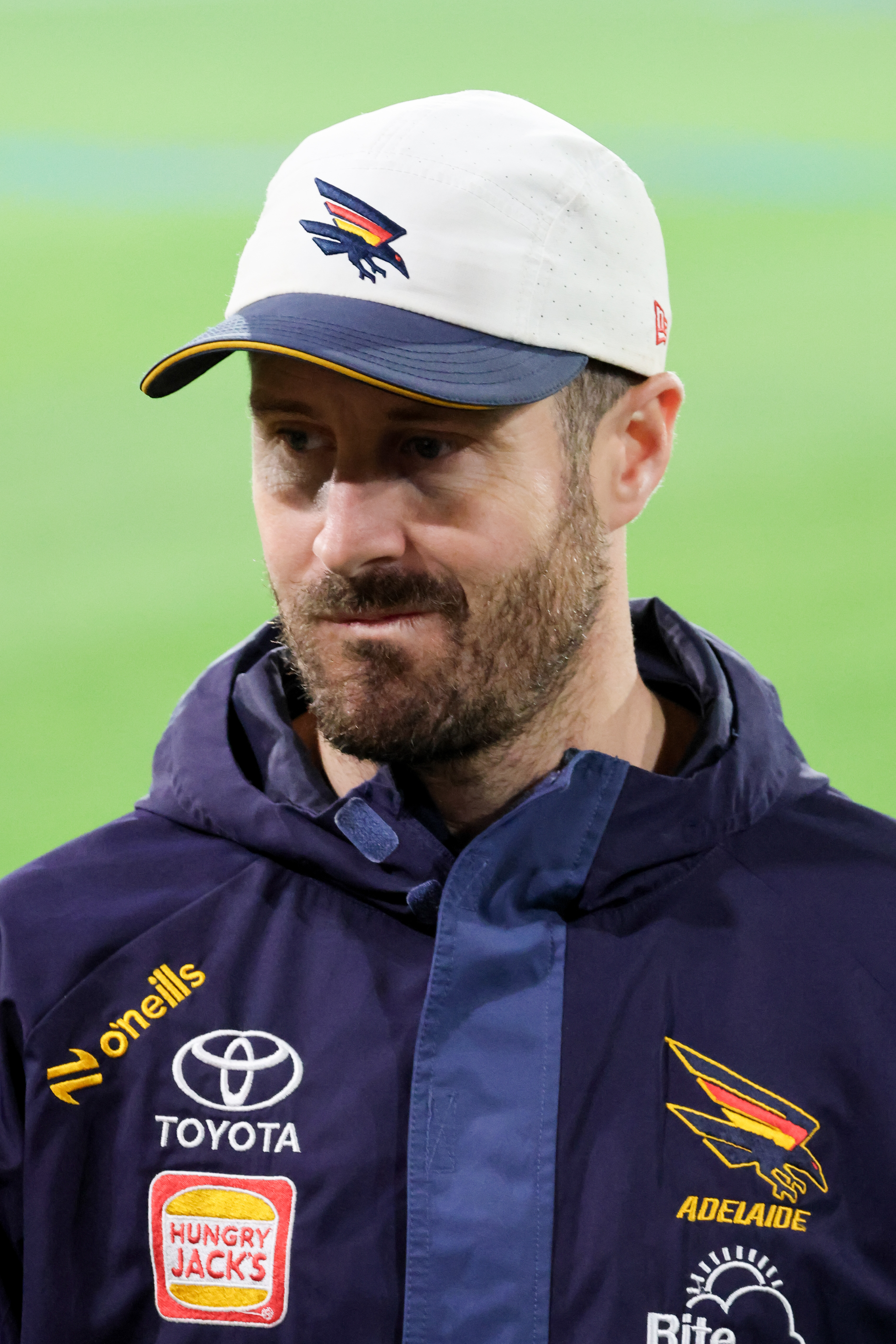
- Wright with Adelaide in 2026

Personal information
- Full name: Matthew Wright
- Nickname: Wrighty
- Born: 14 December 1989 (age 36)
- Original teams: Walkerville (SAAFL); North Adelaide (SANFL)
- Draft: No. 33, 2009 Rookie Draft, Adelaide; No. 82 (RP), 2011 National Draft, Adelaide
- Debut: Round 4, 2011, Adelaide vs. Port Adelaide, at AAMI Stadium
- Height: 178 cm (5 ft 10 in)
- Weight: 76 kg (168 lb)
- Position: Midfielder / small forward

Playing career^{1}
Years	Club	Games (Goals)
2011–2015	Adelaide	94 (63)
2016–2018	Carlton	65 (73)
Total		159 (136)
- ^{1} Playing statistics correct to the end of 2018.

Career highlights
- Carlton leading goalkicker: 2016

Matthew Wright (born 14 December 1989) is a former professional Australian rules footballer who played for the Adelaide Football Club and Carlton Football Club in the Australian Football League (AFL). He was selected with pick 33 in the 2010 rookie draft from North Adelaide in the South Australian National Football League (SANFL).

== Early life ==
Two years prior to being drafted, Wright fractured his skull when he was hit by a glass bottle at a party.

Wright played for Walkerville in the South Australian Amateur Football League (now known as the Adelaide Footy League) and North Adelaide in the SANFL. After missing out on the 2009 national draft, Wright was one of four Adelaide Crows players selected in the 2010 rookie draft.

== AFL career ==
Wright played his first AFL game in 2011 against Port Adelaide in Showdown XXX, replacing Richard Tambling who had injured his ankle in a collision at training. He was named as the substitute player and was on the bench until the third quarter. After being omitted from Adelaide's squad and playing for North Adelaide in the SANFL the following week, he was recalled to the Adelaide side in round six and maintained his position in the senior team for the rest of the season. At the end of 2011, he was elevated to Adelaide's senior list.

In 2012, Wright worked his way into the side early in the season and was a regular in an Adelaide side that made the preliminary final, used as a midfielder/forward and occasional run-with player. He averaged 20 disposals for the season, and in round 20 against Fremantle, he amassed a career-high 37 disposals.

After wearing the number 47 jumper for his first two seasons, Wright switched to the number 11 jumper for the 2013 season. Wright struggled with injury and inconsistent form in 2013, but still played 17 games including crucial 4-goal efforts against Gold Coast and Geelong. Wright returned to form in 2014, playing 20 games, kicking 14 goals and averaging nearly 19 possessions. Wright was delisted by Adelaide in October 2015.

In November, Wright was recruited by Carlton as a delisted free agent. He played all 22 games for Carlton in the 2016 season, primarily as a small forward, and was the Blues' leading goalkicker for the season with 22 goals, including hauls of three goals in the first and last rounds of the year. In his second season at Carlton, he bettered his goal tally by 8, kicking 30 goals in 22 games in the 2017 AFL season. Altogether, Wright played 65 of a possible 66 games in three seasons for Carlton, and kicked 73 goals. He retired from AFL football following the 2018 season to pursue a coaching career back in South Australia.

== Coaching career ==
In 2019 Wright became a development coach at the Adelaide Crows, and captain of the club's reserves team in the SANFL, remaining in both roles until the 2023 season. Wright retired from SANFL football at the conclusion of the 2023 season, but in 2025 returned to Adelaide to become the head coach of the team he captained only two years prior.

== Statistics ==
Statistics are correct to end of the 2018 season

Legend
G	Goals	K	Kicks	D	Disposals	T	Tackles
B	Behinds	H	Handballs	M	Marks

Season	Team	No.	Games	Totals							Averages (per game)						
Season	Team	No.	Games	G	B	K	H	D	M	T	G	B	K	H	D	M	T
2011	Adelaide	47	19	18	8	146	125	271	62	66	1.0	0.4	7.7	6.6	14.3	3.3	3.5
2012	Adelaide	47	22	15	10	230	215	445	91	90	0.7	0.5	10.5	9.8	20.2	4.1	4.1
2013	Adelaide	11	17	11	3	146	132	278	72	44	0.7	0.2	8.6	7.8	16.4	4.2	2.6
2014	Adelaide	11	20	14	8	224	150	374	89	68	0.7	0.4	11.2	7.5	18.7	4.5	3.4
2015	Adelaide	11	16	5	4	143	86	229	43	38	0.3	0.3	8.9	5.4	14.3	2.7	2.4
2016	Carlton	46	22	22	10	262	188	450	80	82	1.0	0.5	11.9	8.6	20.5	3.6	3.7
2017	Carlton	46	22	30	12	236	121	357	96	64	1.4	0.5	10.7	5.5	16.2	4.4	2.9
2018	Carlton	46	21	21	12	179	104	283	81	46	1.0	0.6	8.5	5.0	13.5	3.9	2.2
Career			159	136	67	1566	1121	2687	614	498	0.9	0.4	9.9	7.1	16.9	3.9	3.1
