= Charlie Curnow =

Australian rules footballer (born 1997)

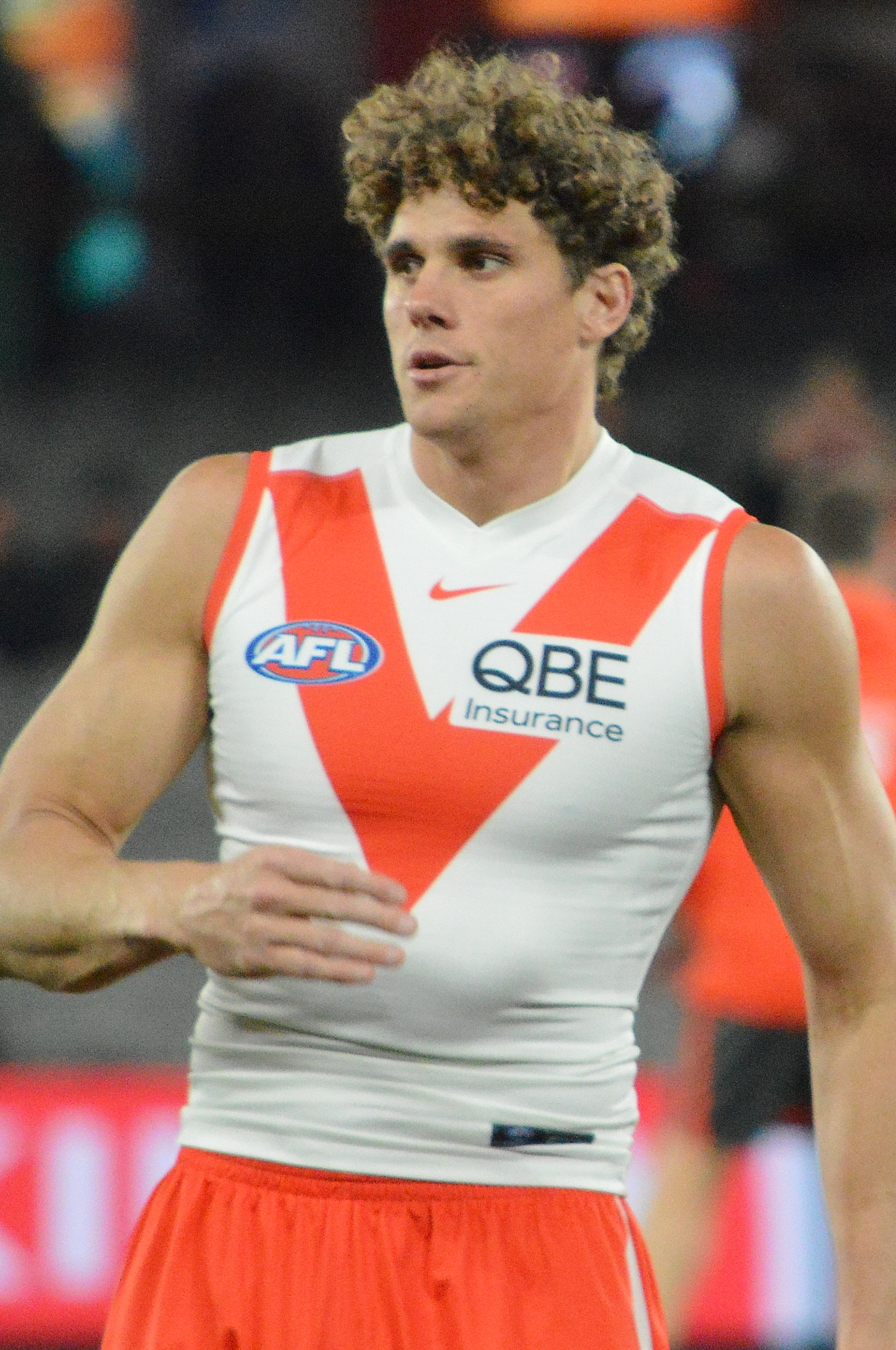
- Curnow with Sydney in August 2026

Personal information
- Full name: Charles Curnow
- Born: 3 February 1997 (age 29)
- Original team: Geelong Falcons (TAC Cup)/Geelong College (APS)
- Draft: No. 12, 2015 national draft
- Debut: Round 2, 2016, Carlton vs. Sydney, at Etihad Stadium
- Height: 194 cm (6 ft 4 in)
- Weight: 94 kg (207 lb)
- Position: Key Forward

Club information
- Current club: Sydney
- Number: 35

Playing career^{1}
Years	Club	Games (Goals)
2016–2025	Carlton	149 (313)
2026–	Sydney	23 (74)
Total		172 (387)
- ^{1} Playing statistics correct to the end of qualifying final, 2026.

Career highlights
- 3× All-Australian team: 2022, 2023, 2026; 3× Coleman Medal: 2022, 2023, 2026; 2× 22under22 team: 2017, 2018; 5× Carlton leading goalkicker: 2018, 2022, 2023, 2024, 2025; Sydney leading goalkicker: 2026; 2017 AFL Rising Star: nominee; Fox Footy Longest Kick winner: 2022; Richard Pratt Medal: 2023; Most Consecutive Games with a Goal in Carlton History

Charles Curnow (born 3 February 1997) is a professional Australian rules footballer who plays as a key forward for the Sydney Swans in the Australian Football League (AFL). He previously played 149 games for Carlton between 2016 and 2025.

Widely praised for his dominance and athleticism, Curnow is a three-time winner of the Coleman Medal, awarded to the leading goalkicker in the home-and-away season. He has been named in the All-Australian team three times, and was Carlton's leading goalkicker five times.

Curnow was drafted by Carlton with the 12th pick in the 2015 national draft. After suffering multiple serious knee injuries that kept him sidelined for extended periods between 2019 and 2021, he made a successful comeback in 2022, re-establishing himself as one of the league's elite forwards before being traded to the Sydney Swans at the end of the 2025 season. His older brother, Ed Curnow, also played for Carlton.

== Early life ==
Curnow grew up on a hobby farm in Bellbrae, Victoria, near Geelong. He is one of five children born to parents Dave and Cassie Curnow.

Curnow attended Geelong College for his schooling and played his state level under-18s football for the Geelong Falcons in the TAC Cup. His draft year in 2015 was significantly interrupted by a dislocated kneecap injury, meaning he missed the under-18 national championships. Despite having played limited games, his athleticism and potential meant he remained a top prospect.

== AFL Playing Career ==
Curnow was selected by Carlton with the twelfth pick in the 2015 national draft.

=== Carlton (2016–2025) ===
==== 2016–2018: Early years and breakout ====
Curnow made his debut in round 2 of the 2016 season against the Sydney Swans at Docklands Stadium. He played six games in his debut year.

The 2017 season marked a year of emergence for Curnow, playing 21 games, averaging over 14 disposals and kicked 20 goals. His performance against Melbourne in round 16 earned him a Rising Star nomination. He was frequently rotated between the key forward position and the wing. He also earned selection in the 22 Under 22 team for the first of two consecutive seasons.

In 2018, Curnow played 20 games and kicking 34 goals, earning him his first leading goalkicker award at Carlton. He was recognised as one of the team's best, finishing equal-third in the John Nicholls Medal and secured his second consecutive 22 Under 22 selection. He signed a four-year contract extension, committing to the club until 2023.

==== 2019–2021: Injury struggles ====
Following his breakout season, Curnow's career was derailed by persistent injuries to his right knee, limiting him to just 15 games across the next three seasons.

In 2019, after a strong start to the season, including a then career-high seven goals against the Western Bulldogs in round 13, Curnow suffered medial ligament damage in his right knee in the following match, ending his season at 11 games played.

Curnow missed the entire 2020 season after suffering a multitude of highly-publicised setbacks involving the same knee. Including dislocating his right kneecap during a social basketball session as well as fracturing the patella and required multiple surgeries to insert and remove wires and screws. Complications continued in 2021, including a hairline stress response in the patella, meaning Curnow did not return to the senior side until the final four games of the season and only managed two goals in those four appearances.

==== 2022–2025: Dual Coleman Medallist and trade ====
Curnow had a return to form in the 2022 season, playing every game and proving the goal-kicking prowess that his early career showed. He won his first Coleman Medal as the league's leading goalkicker, finishing with 64 goals. He and teammate Harry McKay (the 2021 winner) became the first pair of different players from the same side to win consecutive leading goalkickers award since 1900 and 1901. He was selected in his first All-Australian team. At the end of the season, Curnow signed a six-year contract extension, tying him to Carlton until the end of the 2029 season.

The 2023 season saw Curnow solidify himself as the league's top key forward, winning back-to-back Coleman Medals with 81 goals. He set a new career-high when he kicked nine goals in round 7 against the West Coast Eagles, a feat he later surpassed by kicking 10 in the rematch against the Eagles. Curnow became the first Carlton player to kick double-digit goals since Stephen Kernahan in 1995. He was again named in the All-Australian team.

The 2024 and 2025 seasons saw Curnow remain Carlton's leading goalkicker, though he struggled with persisting knee issues again in 2025, playing 18 games before undergoing season-ending surgery. At the conclusion of the 2025 season, Curnow requested a trade, with Geelong and the Sydney Swans being front-runners.

Curnow played for Carlton from 2016 until 2025 for a total of 149 games and kicked a total of 313 goals.

=== Sydney Swans (2026–) ===
Curnow's trade to the Sydney Swans was finalised on the final day of the 2025 trade period, seeing Curnow join the club in exchange for Carlton to receive Will Hayward and a package including multiple draft picks. Upon joining the club, Curnow chose to wear the number 35 guernsey, the same number his brother Ed wore during his career at Carlton.

== Statistics ==
Updated to the end of round 22, 2026.

Legend
G	Goals	K	Kicks	D	Disposals	T	Tackles
B	Behinds	H	Handballs	M	Marks
†	Led the league for the season

Season	Team	No.	Games	Totals							Averages (per game)							Votes
Season	Team	No.	Games	G	B	K	H	D	M	T	G	B	K	H	D	M	T	Votes
2016	Carlton	30	6	5	2	35	25	60	18	9	0.8	0.3	5.8	4.2	10.0	3.0	1.5	0
2017	Carlton	30	21	20	12	207	90	297	119	61	1.0	0.6	9.9	4.3	14.1	5.7	2.9	0
2018	Carlton	30	20	34	20	206	71	277	123	42	1.7	1.0	10.3	3.6	13.9	6.2	2.1	3
2019	Carlton	30	11	18	8	115	20	135	49	17	1.6	0.7	10.5	1.8	12.3	4.5	1.5	3
2020 (Note: The 2020 season was played with 17 home-and-away matches per team (down from 22) and 16-minute quarters with time on (down from 20-minute quarters with time on) due to the impact of the COVID-19 pandemic.)	Carlton	30	0	—	—	—	—	—	—	—	—	—	—	—	—	—	—	0
2021	Carlton	30	4	2	5	35	14	49	16	6	0.5	1.3	8.8	3.5	12.3	4.0	1.5	0
2022	Carlton	30	22	64^{†}	42	231	33	264	126	35	2.9	1.9	10.5	1.5	12.0	5.7	1.6	11
2023	Carlton	30	26	81^{†}	44	280	76	356	180	27	3.1	1.7	10.8	2.9	13.7	6.9	1.0	17
2024	Carlton	30	21	57	41	214	40	254	125	20	2.7	2.0	10.2	1.9	12.1	6.0	1.0	2
2025	Carlton	30	18	32	27	177	35	212	107	21	1.8	1.5	9.8	1.9	11.8	5.9	1.2	1
2026	Sydney	35	20	75	31	183	44	227	95	21	3.1	1.6	9.2	2.2	11.4	4.8	1.1	0
Career			169	375	232	1683	448	2131	958	259	2.2	1.4	10.0	2.7	12.6	5.7	1.5	37

== Honours and achievements ==
Team

- McClelland Trophy: (Sydney) 2026

Individual

- All-Australian team: 2022, 2023, 2026
- 2× 22under22 team: 2017, 2018
- AFL Rising Star nominee: 2017
- Coleman Medal: 2022, 2023, 2026
