= Maurie Johnson =

Australian rules footballer, born 1907

Personal information
- Full name: Maurice Richard Johnson
- Born: 15 January 1907; Brunswick, Victoria
- Died: 30 May 2000 (aged 93)
- Original team: Coburg Jrs/Brunswick
- Height: 177 cm (5 ft 10 in)
- Weight: 81.5 kg (180 lb)

Playing career^{1}
Years	Club	Games (Goals)
1927–1936	Carlton	109 (70)
1936–1937	South Melbourne	19 (27)
Total		128 (97)
- ^{1} Playing statistics correct to the end of 1937.

Career highlights
- Captain for the 1934 VFL season

Maurice Richard 'Mocha' Johnson (15 January 1907 – 30 May 2000) was an Australian rules footballer who played for Carlton and South Melbourne in the Victorian Football League.

Johnson made his debut for the Carlton Football Club in Round 5 of the 1927 season. He had a falling-out with coach Frank Maher after six rounds of the 1936 season, which resulted in him leaving Carlton to join South Melbourne. In 1938, Johnson captain-coached Launceston to both the NTFA and Tasmanian State Premierships.

Johnson died in May 2000.
