= Ivan Rohrt =

Ivanhoe (Ivan) Borch Rohrt (23 March 1920 – 9 March 2016) was a former president of the Carlton Football Club from 1974 to 1977. He was also appointed as a director on the Victorian Football League Board.
