= Gerald Burke =

Australian rules footballer

Personal information
- Full name: Gerald Peter Burke
- Born: 2 December 1930
- Died: 24 June 1994 (aged 63)
- Original team: Carlton Stars
- Debut: Round 6, 1953, Carlton vs. Hawthorn, at Glenferrie Oval
- Height: 187 cm (6 ft 2 in)
- Weight: 82 kg (181 lb)

Playing career^{1}
Years	Club	Games (Goals)
1953–1960	Carlton	87 (113)
- ^{1} Playing statistics correct to the end of 1960.

Gerald Peter Burke (2 December 1930 – 24 June 1994) was an Australian rules footballer in the Victorian Football League.

Burke made his debut for the Carlton Football Club in the Round 6 of the 1953 season. He retired at the end of the 1960 season.
