= Fred Webber =

Australian rules footballer

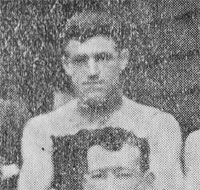
- Webber during his Carlton career

Personal information
- Full name: Frederick John Webber
- Born: 28 April 1883; Abbotsford, Victoria
- Died: 7 September 1966 (aged 83); Urana, New South Wales
- Original team: Carlton College
- Height: 178 cm (5 ft 10 in)
- Weight: 72 kg (159 lb)

Playing career^{1}
| Years | Club | Games (Goals) |
| 1902–1904 | Carlton | 23 (26) |
- ^{1} Playing statistics correct to the end of 1904.

Frederick John Webber (28 April 1883 – 7 September 1966) was an Australian rules footballer in the Victorian Football League (VFL).

Webber made his debut for the Carlton Football Club in Round 8 of the 1902 season. He left the Blues at the end of the 1904 season.
