= Peter Williams (Australian footballer, born 1867) =

Australian rules footballer

Personal information
- Full name: Peter Francis Williams
- Born: 15 April 1867; Ballarat East, Victoria
- Died: 3 March 1949 (aged 81); Royal Park, Melbourne
- Original team: Ballarat Second Twenty

Playing career^{1}
Years	Club	Games (Goals)
1890-1895	Carlton (VFA)	94 (32)
1897–1899, 1901	Carlton	34 (1)
Total		128 (33)
- ^{1} Playing statistics correct to the end of 1901.

Career highlights
- Leading goalkicker 1890 (20)

Peter Francis Williams (15 April 1867 – 3 March 1949) was an Australian rules footballer who played with Carlton in the VFA and Victorian Football League (VFL). He was appointed captain of Carlton in 1894, but resigned after Carlton finished last.

During the season, he had upset club officials after he and a teammate failed to appear for a match against Collingwood. Carlton retained him as a player for 1895, even though he had considered crossing to North Melbourne, but was injured in Round 9 and missing the remainder of that season and all of 1896.

He was 30 years old when the VFL began in 1897, and he made his VFL debut in Round 2 against South Melbourne, his first game in 18 months. He played 11 matches that year, including his 100th for the club, and played 11 matches in each of 1898 and 1899 before he retired.

He returned for one game in Round 5 1901, when Carlton were short of players for a match against St Kilda, and kicked his first goal since 1896.
