= Jack Geddes (footballer) =

Australian rules footballer

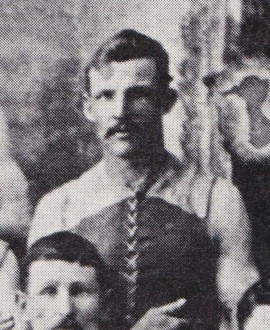
- Geddes in 1899

Personal information
- Full name: John Geddes
- Born: 4 February 1868; Camberwell, Victoria
- Died: 3 August 1949 (aged 81); North Perth, Western Australia
- Original team: Carlton (VFA) / Rovers
- Height: 174 cm (5 ft 9 in)
- Weight: 76 kg (168 lb)

Playing career^{1}
Years	Club	Games (Goals)
1899	Collingwood	2 (0)
- ^{1} Playing statistics correct to the end of 1899.

Jack Geddes (4 February 1868 – 3 August 1949) was an Australian rules footballer who played with Collingwood in the Victorian Football League (VFL).
