= Mathew Buck =

Coaching career^{3}
Years	Club	Games (W–L–D)
2023–	Carlton (W)	2 (1–1–0)
- ^{3} Coaching statistics correct as of round 2, 2023.

Mathew Buck is an Australian rules football coach who is currently the head coach of Carlton in the AFL Women's competition (AFLW).

== Coaching career ==
Buck began his coaching career in the Hampden Football Netball League as an assistant coach with Koroit from 2014 to 2015. He then moved to fellow Hampden league club South Warrnambool to take the head coach role from 2016 to 2018, before returning to assist at Koroit in 2019.

Meanwhile, Buck plied his trade as a development coach with the Greater Western Victoria Rebels in the NAB League from 2018 to 2019 before spending two seasons with Werribee in the Victorian Football League (VFL) in a similar role. Buck first joined Carlton in 2021 as assistant coach of the team's reserves in the VFL alongside head of development Luke Power. Buck also worked in development at the Geelong Falcons during this time.

Buck was officially appointed to the role of senior Carlton women's coach on 4 April 2023, replacing the outgoing Daniel Harford.

== Personal life ==
Buck has a professional background in education.
