= John Heathcote (footballer) =

Australian rules footballer

Personal information
- Born: 23 January 1934
- Died: 23 June 2008 (aged 74)
- Original team: Ulverstone (NWFU)
- Debut: Round 3, 1958, Carlton vs. Geelong, at Princes Park
- Height: 170 cm (5 ft 7 in)
- Weight: 71.5 kg (158 lb)

Playing career^{1}
Years	Club	Games (Goals)
1958–1962	Carlton	69 (70)
- ^{1} Playing statistics correct to the end of 1962.

John Heathcote (23 January 1934 – 23 June 2008) was an Australian rules footballer in the Victorian Football League.

Heathcote made his debut for the Carlton Football Club in the Round 2 of the 1958 season. He left the club at the end of the 1962 season.
