= Bruce Comben =

Australian rules footballer and coach

Personal information
- Full name: Robert Bruce Comben
- Born: 23 October 1930
- Died: 15 December 2002 (aged 72)
- Original team: Werribee South
- Debut: Round 1, 1950, Carlton vs. Melbourne, at M.C.G.
- Height: 175 cm (5 ft 9 in)
- Weight: 72 kg (159 lb)

Playing career^{1}
Years	Club	Games (Goals)
1950–1961	Carlton	188 (36)
- ^{1} Playing statistics correct to the end of 1961.

Bruce Comben (23 October 1930 – 15 December 2002) was an Australian rules footballer in the Victorian Football League (VFL).

Comben made his debut for the Carlton Football Club in the Round 1 of the 1950 season. He retired from the game at the end of the 1961 season. During his time at the club, he was Captain from 1958 to 1960, and won Best and Fairest in both 1957 and 1958. He was inducted into the Carlton Hall of Fame in 1989.

Bruce died in 2002. He owned supermarkets in the Laverton and Werribee area, when they were named SSW. However, the Werribee branch closed and the Laverton store became Comben's IGA. Recently, the Laverton store has been sold and will no longer be called Comben's IGA.

Bruce was a two time best and fairest winner for the Carlton Football Club and was named as back pocket in their team of the century.
