= Charlie Fisher (Australian footballer) =

Australian rules footballer

Personal information
- Full name: Charles Henry Fisher
- Born: 17 November 1892; Cobram, Victoria
- Died: 4 March 1983 (aged 90); Brunswick, Victoria
- Original teams: Muckatah, Kyabram (GVFL)
- Debut: Round 2, 1914, Carlton vs. St Kilda, at Princes Park
- Height: 178 cm (5 ft 10 in)
- Weight: 89 kg (196 lb)

Playing career^{1}
| Years | Club | Games (Goals) |
| 1914–1921 | Carlton | 111 (147) |
- ^{1} Playing statistics correct to the end of 1921.

Charlie "Spot" Fisher (17 November 1892 – 4 Mar 1983) was an Australian rules footballer in the Victorian Football League (VFL).

== Football ==
Fisher played in three consecutive premierships for Muckatah in the Goulburn Valley Football Association in 1910, 1911 and 1912, before playing with Kyabram Football Club in the Goulburn Valley Football League (GVFL) in 1913 and 1914.

Fisher made his debut for the Carlton Football Club in round 2 of the 1914 season. Fisher played with Kyabram in the GVFL on a Wednesday, then with Carlton in the VFL on a Saturday in 1914. Fisher managed to kick 39 goals for Kyabram in 11 games and 22 goals for Carlton in 16 games in 1914!

Fisher was a member of the Carlton's 1914 and 1915 VFL premiership teams and was also a member of their 1916 VFL Grand Final team that lost to Fitzroy.

In 1919, he was club captain and also led the team's goalkicking.

Fisher retired from VFL football at the end of the 1921 season and was appointed as captain / coach of Brunswick in the VFA, who finished 5th.
