= Horrie Clover =

Australian rules footballer (1895-1984)

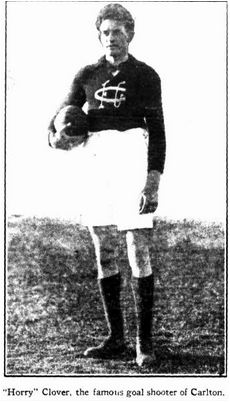
- Clover in 1922

Personal information
- Full name: Horace Ray Clover
- Born: 20 March 1895; Carisbrook, Victoria
- Died: 1 January 1984 (aged 88); Mordialloc, Victoria
- Original teams: Temperance, Carisbrook, Maryborough
- Debut: Round 2, 1920, Carlton vs. Richmond, at Punt Road Oval
- Height: 185 cm (6 ft 1 in)
- Weight: 87 kg (192 lb)
- Position: centre half forward

Playing career^{1}
Years	Club	Games (Goals)
1920–1931	Carlton	147 (396)

Coaching career
Years	Club	Games (W–L–D)
1922–1923, 1927	Carlton	45 (26–18–1)
- ^{1} Playing statistics correct to the end of 1931.

Career highlights
- Carlton captain/coach 1922–24, 1927; Carlton leading goalkicker 1920–1923, 1926, 1928; Carlton Best & Fairest 1929; VFL Leading Goalkicker 1922; Victorian representative (9 games, 20 goals).

Horace Ray Clover (20 March 1895 – 1 January 1984) was a leading Australian rules footballer in the (then) Victorian Football League (VFL).

== Family ==
The son of Robert James Clover (1864-1900), and Phoebe Rubina Clover (-1901), née Smith, Horace Ray Clover was born at Carisbrook, Victoria on 20 March 1895.

He married Alberta Victoria Porter (1901-1983) on 29 January 1927.

== Football ==
At 6 ft. 1in., he had a long reach: his finger-tip to finger-tip span was 6 ft. 5in.

=== Carlton (VFL) ===
"There's quite a story behind Horrie Clover's entry into Carlton, showing that his connection with football was something of a freak. The bare outline of this story will be sufficient. Actually he came to Melbourne in 1919 and joined the Carlton Cricket Club, with no thought of football.
While on a cricket tour with the V.C.A. team to Mildura and Wentworth in association with the late Lyle Downs, a dyed-in-the-wool Carltonite. He and Lyle joined a group of locals having some practice kicks at Wentworth. Evidently Lyle saw enough because, as Horrie himself said, "After that he never let up on me until I put of a [Carlton] uniform". — Rod McGregor, The Sporting Globe.

Clover was a high-marking centre half-forward who starred from his first game, kicking three goals and hitting the post four times.

=== Victoria (VFL) ===
He was selected to play for Victoria against South Australia on the MCG on 29 May 1920, after having only played three senior VFL games; however, due to an injury he sustained in the match against Essendon on 22 May 1920, he was unable to play, and was replaced in the selected side by Paddy O'Brien.

=== Carlton official ===
Clover was Carlton's key player during his career, including stints as playing coach in 1922-23 and 1927 for 26 wins from 45 matches. He also served as club secretary, vice-president and president over many years.

== Hall of fame ==
Called "one of the finest exponents of the centre-half-forward position that the game has known", Clover was inducted into the Australian Football Hall of Fame in 1996.

== Cricket ==
Clover played 20 games of first eleven cricket with the Carlton Cricket Club in the Melbourne District Cricket Association.

== Sources ==
- Discovering Anzacs: Profile: Horace Ray Clover (4455), at National Archives of Australia.
- First World War Embarkation Roll: Private Horace Ray Clover (4456), collection of the Australian War Memorial.
- First World War Nominal Roll: Private Horace Roy Clover (4455), collection of the Australian War Memorial.
- World War One Service Record: Private Horace Ray Clover (4455), at National Archives of Australia.
- Footballer Who Gambles With Death: Runs Grave Risk With Every Kick, The (Sydney) Daily Pictorial, (Tuesday, 12 August 1930), p.5.
- Atkinson, G. (1982) Everything you ever wanted to know about Australian rules football but couldn't be bothered asking, The Five Mile Press: Melbourne. ISBN 0 86788 009 0.
- Clover, H.R., "The Art of Forward Play: By Carlton's Own Clover", The Sporting Globe, (Wednesday, 30 August 1922), p.7.
- Clover, H.R., "Football Needs Cleansing: Horrie Clover's Timely Criticism", The Sporting Globe, (Saturday, 20 September 1924), p.7.
- J.W., "Notes and Comments", The Australasian, (Saturday, 22 May 1926), p.38: remarks on Clover's presence in the VFL's Umpire and Permit Committee.
- Ross, J. (ed), 100 Years of Australian Football 1897–1996: The Complete Story of the AFL, All the Big Stories, All the Great Pictures, All the Champions, Every AFL Season Reported, Viking, (Ringwood), 1996. ISBN 0-670-86814-0
- Ross, John (1999). The Australian Football Hall of Fame. Australia: HarperCollinsPublishers. p. 51. ISBN 0-7322-6426-X.
- Sharland, W.S., "Idol of Carlton Crowds: Australia's Best Centre Half-Forward", The Sporting Globe, (Saturday, 4 August 1928), p.6.
