= Ernie Walton =

Australian rules footballer

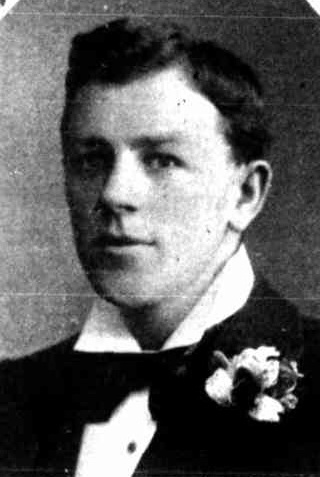
- Walton in 1899

Personal information
- Full name: Ernest Alfred Walton
- Born: 7 April 1875; Geelong
- Died: 23 August 1946 (aged 71); Brighton, Victoria
- Original team: Austral
- Debut: Round 1, 1894, Carlton vs. Geelong, at Corio Oval

Playing career^{1}
Years	Club	Games (Goals)
1894–1896	Carlton (VFA)	49 (1)
1897–1904	Carlton	120 (8)
Total		169 (9)
- ^{1} Playing statistics correct to the end of 1904.

Career highlights
- Captain 1898–1899; Vice-captain 1897, 1900, 1903

Ernest Alfred Walton (7 April 1875 – 23 August 1946) was an Australian rules footballer in the VFA and the Victorian Football League (VFL).

Walton made his debut for the Carlton Football Club in Round 1 of the 1894 season, becoming a regular in the team, and was playing for them when the Victorian Football League began in 1897. He captained the Blues in 1898 and 1899, and represented Victoria in 1899 and 1902. Walton also had stints as vice captain in 1897, 1900 and 1903.

Walton maintained connections with the club after his retirement, becoming treasurer of the club in 1911 and serving until 1913, as well as being an official in other capacities. His 169 matches was a club record until passed by team-mate Fred Elliott in Round 17 of 1909.
