= Colin Martyn =

Australian rules footballer (1903–1968)

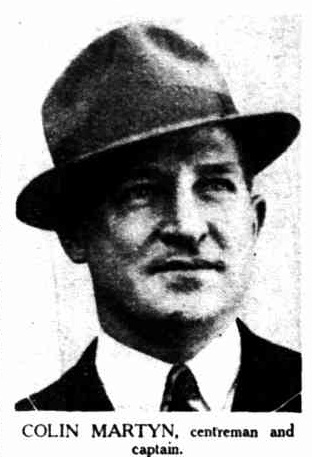
- Martyn in 1940

Personal information
- Full name: Ronald Arthur Colin Martyn
- Born: 27 January 1903; Brunswick, Victoria
- Died: 11 January 1968 (aged 64); Lakes Entrance, Victoria
- Original team: Coburg (VFA)
- Debut: Round 3, 1928, Carlton vs. Hawthorn, at Glenferrie Oval
- Height: 178 cm (5 ft 10 in)
- Weight: 76 kg (168 lb)

Playing career^{1}
Years	Club	Games (Goals)
1928–1932	Carlton	85 (2)
- ^{1} Playing statistics correct to the end of 1932.

Ronald Arthur Colin Martyn (27 January 1903 – 11 January 1968) was an Australian rules footballer who played in the Victorian Football League (VFL).

Martyn made his debut for the Carlton Football Club in round 3 of the 1928 season. He left the game at the end of the 1932 season.
