= Charlie Davey (footballer) =

Australian rules footballer

Personal information
- Full name: Charles Aden Lawrence Davey
- Born: 11 May 1908; Carlton, Victoria
- Died: 14 August 1991 (aged 83); Box Hill, Victoria
- Original team: Chelsea
- Debut: Round 18, 1927, Carlton vs. St Kilda, at Princes Park
- Height: 192 cm (6 ft 4 in)
- Weight: 87 kg (192 lb)

Playing career^{1}
Years	Club	Games (Goals)
1927–1937	Carlton	143 (121)
- ^{1} Playing statistics correct to the end of 1937.

Charles Aden Lawrence Davey (11 May 1908 – 14 August 1991) was an Australian rules footballer who played in the Victorian Football League (VFL).

Recruited from the Chelsea Football Club, Davey made his debut for the Carlton Football Club in Round 18 of the 1927 season.

In his first VFL match, against St Kilda, on 10 September 1927, playing at centre half-forward, he kicked six goals.

He had been a last minute inclusion in the senior team (due to injuries and suspensions to selected players), and he had not been in the selected team announced on the Saturday morning. According to The Argus,

"[The new man] Davey showed great promise. Davey is a tall young player, who marks splendidly, and should be a success on the forward line, his six goals being a fine performance. He is aged 19 years, and is 6ft. 3½in. [192cm.] in height".

The next match, the 1927 Semi-Final that Carlton lost to Richmond 12.10 (82) to 11.10 (76), he played at full-forward and kicked one goal.

He was soon moved into the ruck, and became one of the VFL's best ruckmen of his day.

He was known to be strong and versatile in the ruck, a reliable kick, and an outstanding strong mark. He was renowned for his use of his body strength to create space for his smaller team-mates.

In 1933, he survived electrocution.

TOUCHED LIVE WIRE — Footballer Escapes Death

(The Argus, Monday, 13 November 1933.)
When he received a shock from an electric wire at the intersection of Swanston and Lonsdale streets, city, yesterday morning. Charles Davey, aged 25 years, linesman, of Elgin street Carlton a leading member of the Carlton Football Club, escaped serious injury. Davey, who is employed by the electric supply department of the City Council, was repairing street lighting wires from a motor-truck with a raised platform. Finding that the platform was too low to enable him to work on a line attached to a tram-way standard at the intersection of Swanton and Lonsdale streets, he placed a ladder against the pole and ascended.
"When he reached the top", said Mr. P. Stanton, an ambulance attendant, who witnessed the accident, "his hand touched a wire. He cried out and fell against the top of the ladder. Had he fallen to the side or backward he would have dropped about 20ft to the roadway."

Davey's fellow-workman jumped up the ladder and held him there until the attendants of a civil ambulance, which was leaving the Melbourne Hospital, and the attendant of a St. John motor-cycle ambulance patrol, which was standing nearby, reached him. Davey was lowered to the platform, and was then strapped to a spine board and lowered to the street. He suffered severely from shock. After having received treatment at the Melbourne Hospital for more than an hour he was allowed to return to his home.

He was Carlton's captain in 1935.

He retired prematurely at the end of the 1937 season, due to a chronic knee injury, having played 143 senior games for Carlton, and having kicked 121 goals.

He also played 17 games for Victoria.

He served on the Carlton Committee from 1938 until December 1964.

In 1994 he was posthumously inducted into the Carlton Hall of Fame.
