= Katie Loynes =

Australian rules footballer

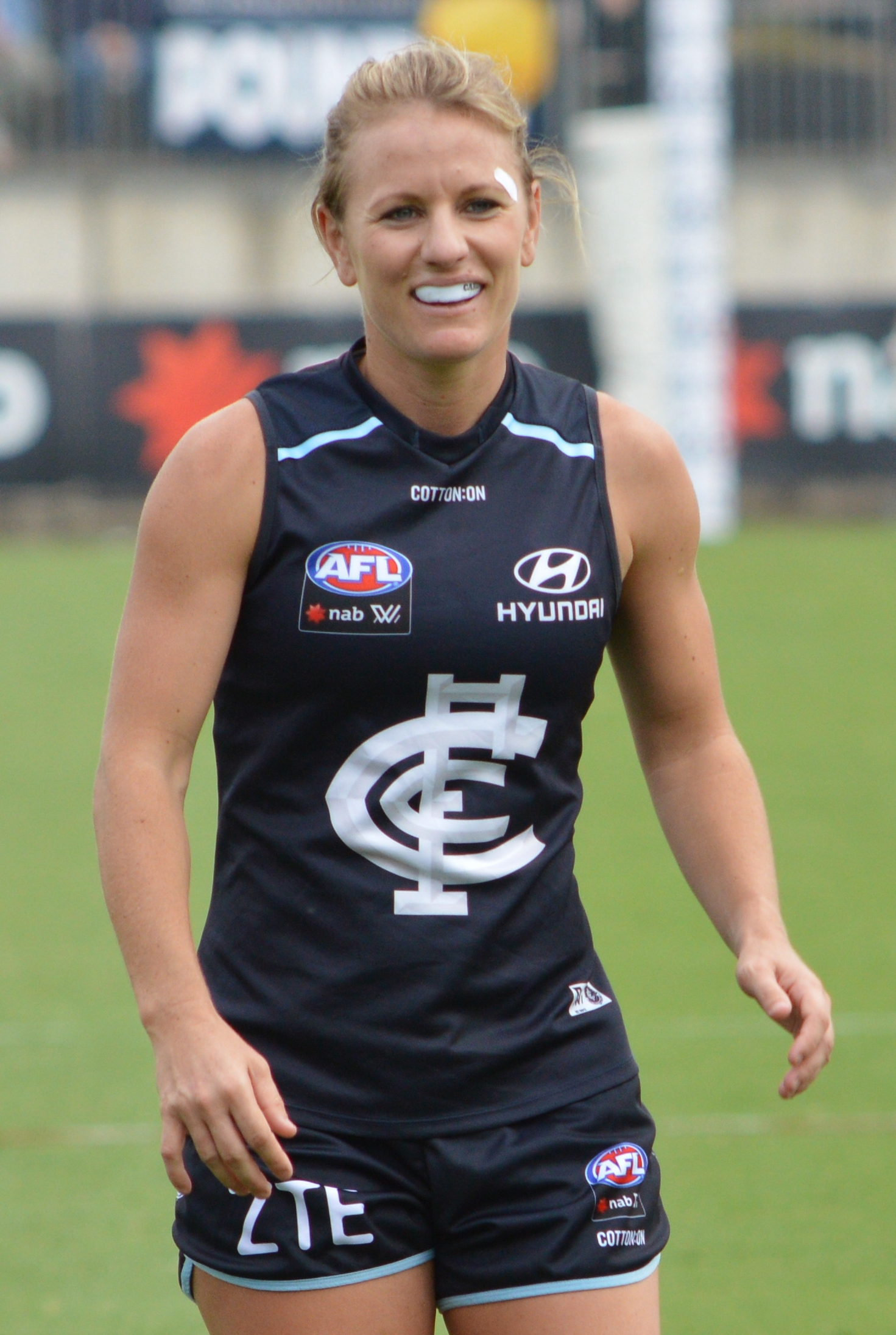
- Loynes with Carlton in March 2018

Personal information
- Born: 23 March 1986 (age 40)
- Original team: Diamond Creek (VFL Women's)
- Draft: No. 110, 2016 AFL Women's draft
- Debut: Round 1, 2017, Carlton vs. Collingwood, at Ikon Park
- Height: 168 cm (5 ft 6 in)
- Position: Midfielder

Playing career^{1}
Years	Club	Games (Goals)
2017–2021	Carlton	36 (7)
2022 (S6)	Greater Western Sydney	9 (2)
Total		45 (9)
- ^{1} Playing statistics correct to the end of the 2022 season.

Career highlights
- Carlton best and fairest: 2018

Katie Loynes (born 23 March 1986) is a retired Australian rules footballer who played for Carlton and Greater Western Sydney in the AFL Women's (AFLW) competition.

== AFLW career ==
Loynes was drafted by Carlton with the club's fourteenth selection and the one hundred and tenth overall in the 2016 AFL Women's draft. She made her debut in Round 1, 2017, in the club and the league's inaugural match at Ikon Park against Collingwood. At the end of the 2018 season, she was the joint winner of the club best and fairest alongside Breann Moody. Loynes was delisted by Carlton at the conclusion of the 2021 season. A few weeks later it was announced that she joined Greater Western Sydney. In April 2022, Loynes retired after 45 AFLW games.

== Personal life ==
She is a teacher at Mordialloc College, a Secondary School in Melbourne's South-East. She teaches Physical Education and Health and Human Development.
