= Will Stuckey =

Australian rules footballer

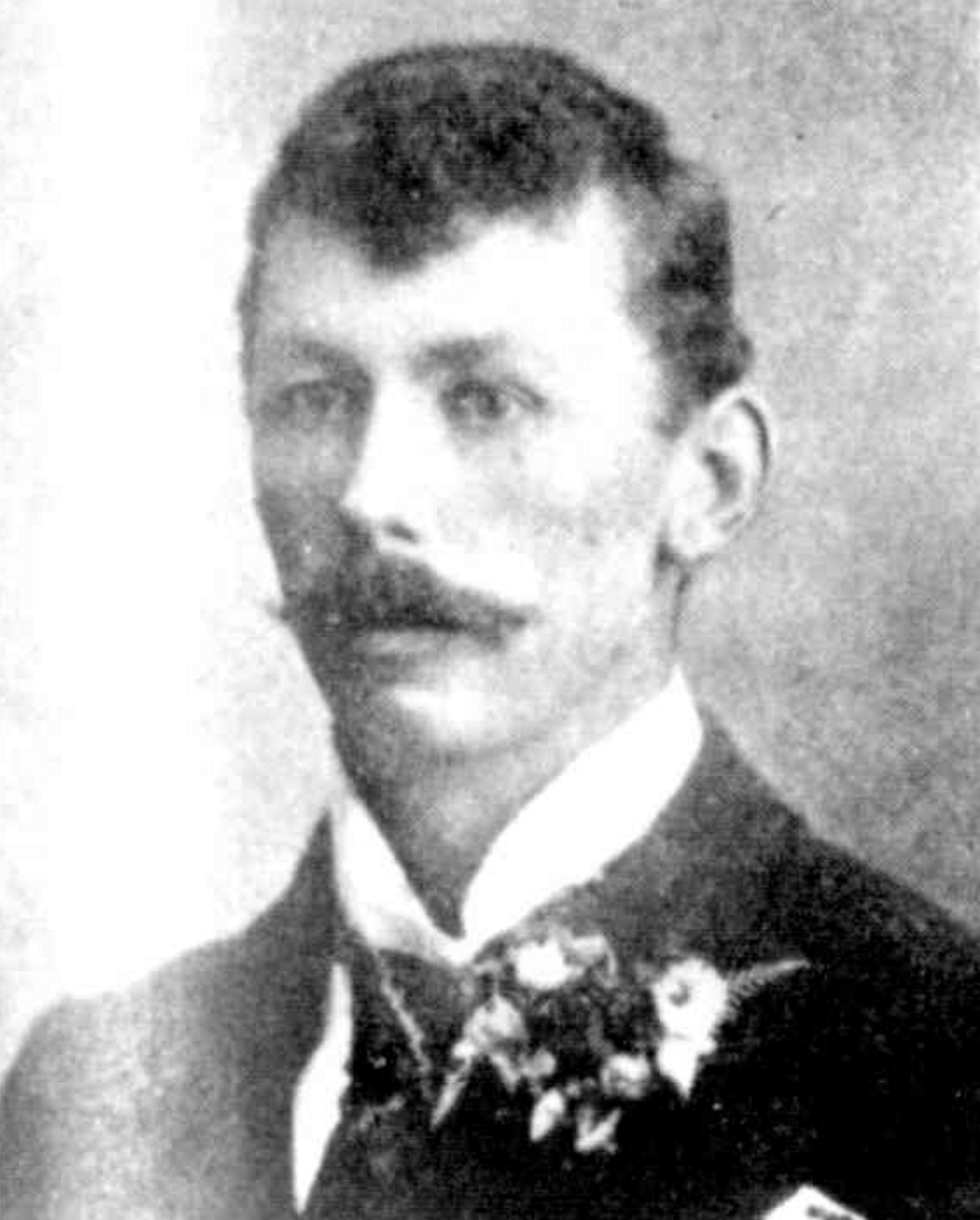
- Stuckey in 1899

Personal information
- Full name: William Winter Stuckey
- Born: 27 July 1873; Walhalla, Victoria
- Died: 21 September 1928 (aged 55); Mentone, Victoria
- Original team: West Melbourne

Playing career^{1}
Years	Club	Games (Goals)
1894–1897	North Melbourne (VFA)	
1898	West Melbourne	
1899–1901	Carlton	28 (1)
- ^{1} Playing statistics correct to the end of 1901.

William Winter Stuckey (27 July 1873 – 21 September 1928) was an Australian rules footballer in the Victorian Football League (VFL).

Stuckey made his debut for the Carlton Football Club in round 1 of the 1899 season. He left the Blues at the end of the 1901 season. He was the brother of Essendon player George Stuckey.
