= Paddy O'Brien (Australian rules footballer) =

Australian rules footballer and coach

Personal information
- Full name: Patrick Joseph O'Brien
- Born: 16 April 1893; Footscray, Victoria
- Died: 25 March 1964 (aged 70); Newport, Victoria
- Original team: Yarraville
- Height: 183 cm (6 ft 0 in)
- Weight: 86 kg (190 lb)

Playing career^{1}
Years	Club	Games (Goals)
1913–1925	Carlton	167 (7)
1925–1926	Footscray	15 (0)
Total		182 (7)

Coaching career
Years	Club	Games (W–L–D)
1925	Carlton	2 (0–2–0)
- ^{1} Playing statistics correct to the end of 1926.

Patrick Joseph O'Brien (16 April 1893 – 25 March 1964) was an Australian rules footballer who played with Carlton in the Victorian Football League (VFL).

== Football ==
O'Brien was a physically tough defender who usually played at centre half back. He was Carlton's captain in 1924, and was a member of Carlton's back-to-back premierships in 1914 and 1915.

In 1925, he commenced the season as Carlton's playing coach but lasted only two games due to disagreements within the team. He left to join Footscray during their inaugural VFL season but played just 15 games for the club.
