= Sam Docherty =

Australian rules footballer

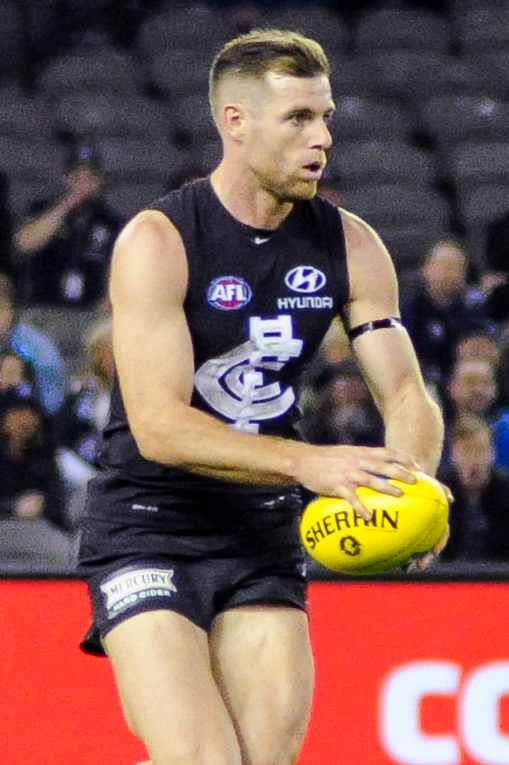
- Docherty playing for Carlton in June 2017

Personal information
- Full name: Sam Docherty
- Born: 17 October 1993 (age 33); Wonthaggi, Victoria
- Original teams: Phillip Island (WGFL); Gippsland Power (TAC Cup)
- Draft: No. 12, 2011 AFL draft
- Height: 185 cm (6 ft 1 in)
- Weight: 85 kg (187 lb)
- Position: Defender

Playing career^{1}
Years	Club	Games (Goals)
2012–2013	Brisbane Lions	13 (1)
2014–2025	Carlton	171 (30)
Total		184 (31)
- ^{1} Playing statistics correct to the end of the 2025 season.

Career highlights
- Carlton co-captain: 2019–2021; John Nicholls Medal: 2016; All-Australian team: 2017; David Parkin Medal: 2017, 2022; 22under22 team: 2016; Jim Stynes Community Leadership Award: 2023; 2x NEAFL premiership player: 2012, 2013

Sam Docherty (born 17 October 1993) is a former Australian rules footballer who played for the Carlton Football Club and the Brisbane Lions in the Australian Football League (AFL). He was recruited from the Gippsland Power in the TAC Cup with the 12th selection in the 2011 AFL draft.

== Early life ==
Docherty grew up on Phillip Island and was a supporter of the Carlton Football Club. He learned the game through the Phillip Island Auskick program. He played all of his junior football for Phillip Island Bulldogs in the Alberton Football Netball League, making his senior debut in 2009 as a 15 year old, playing alongside his older brother Josh. He played 13 games, kicking 2 goals in his senior debut year, and was named in the best players in seven games.

In 2010, as a 16-year-old, Docherty no longer played under-18 football for Phillip Island, despite being picked for the Alberton Interleague team. Instead, he played 21 games for the senior team and kicked 16 goals, despite his pre-season training being hampered when he strained the quadratus lumberum muscle in his back. As a result, he missed selection in Gippsland Power's TAC Cup squad as an underage player.

In 2011, Docherty played 16 games for the Gippsland Power in the TAC Cup, playing across the half-back line. Docherty used his run and carry skills for the Power, averaging 22 disposals a game, and was ranked second in the TAC Cup competition in marking from opposition kicks and rebound 50s. Docherty only played one game for Phillip Island in which he was named second-best for the Bulldogs, with his brother Josh being named best.

Despite his form for Gippsland, Docherty missed out on selection in the initial Vic Country squad for the 2011 AFL Under 18 Championships, but he was brought in for the fourth game of the carnival, delivering an eye-catching display across half-back against WA, with 21 possessions and five rebound 50s. He remained in the Vic Country team that faced Vic Metro in the last round of the championships. A hip injury incurred while playing for the Power meant that Docherty could not perform at the AFL draft camp.

At the Gippsland Power awards he won the Most Disciplined and Trainers Awards plus was named in the 2011 TAC Cup Team of the Year. Despite the injury and being relatively unknown to AFL recruiters at the start of the year, Docherty was expected to be a first-round pick in the 2011 AFL draft. He was ultimately selected by the Brisbane Lions with their second selection (pick No. 12 overall) at the 2011 AFL National Draft. He became the first player from Phillip Island to be drafted into the AFL.

== AFL career ==
=== Brisbane Lions (2011–2013) ===
He struggled with his hip injury when he first arrived at Brisbane, almost immediately underwent surgery to correct a minor complaint he had carried through the 2011 season. It meant that he would spend the bulk of his first pre-season in rehab. After one practice match, a hamstring strain sidelined him for another month. He then came back in round 5 and spent all of the 2012 playing for the Brisbane reserves side in the North East Australian Football League (NEAFL). Docherty was named as a senior emergency on a couple of occasions. But, in the end, his delayed start to the season meant that he left his run a little too late for an AFL debut. He was pivotal in Brisbane's claiming the NEAFL premiership flag, his skill, poise and efficient disposals in difficult conditions at Yeronga in the NEAFL northern conference final against the NT Thunder was impressive.

He made his AFL debut in round 4 of the 2013 AFL season against North Melbourne wearing number 1, he became the 150th player to play for the Brisbane Lions. He played 13 AFL games for the season, usually as the sub; he was the sub in 5 games and was subbed off on one occasion. He averaged 13 disposals playing off half back. In the 2013 season he played 6 NEAFL games which he impressed in, he averaged 21 disposals per match and demonstrated that he can find the ball, racking up 30 plus twice. At the end of the 2013 season as Michael Voss was sacked as Brisbane coach, Docherty was uncontracted with the Lions and told his manager he wanted to come home back to Victoria. Western Bulldogs, Carlton and Essendon all showed interest in Docherty; however, Carlton were the front runners. After meeting with Carlton, Docherty nominated them as his destination club was traded to the Carlton Football Club for pick 33 in the 2013 AFL draft during the 2013 trade period. Docherty was referred to in Brisbane as one of the "Go Home Five" in a messy off-season that also saw fellow Brisbane youngsters who were recruited in 2010 and 2011 Elliot Yeo, Billy Longer, Jared Polec and Patrick Karnezis all walk out on the club.

=== Carlton (2013–2025) ===
Arriving at Carlton was a lifelong dream for Docherty; however, he had an unfortunate preseason for the Blues. Carlton had made the finals in 2013 and were expecting to improve with the acquisitions of Docherty and Dale Thomas. While he was away overseas he hurt his knee hiking, aggravating his injury from early 2013 and before leaving for Carlton's preseason camp in America he woke up one morning with a puffy eye, looking like he had been punched. It turned out to be a rare auto-immune disease which required surgery. He was still able to attend the camp but received a phone call to hear that his father Eddie had died suddenly after a heart attack at age 53. His funeral was held at the Phillip Island football club rooms, where he had been a player and coach of the club.

Sam started the season with the Northern Blues but had to wait until round 7 to make his AFL debut for Carlton after recovering from a strained a tendon in his quad while on pre season camp, which eventually required surgery despite initially being diagnosed as tendinitis in his knee. It was a huge match against Collingwood on a Friday night at the MCG, in front of a crowd of 68,000, he started from the interchange bench and impressed with his poise under pressure as the Blues went down by 24 points. He went on thereafter to play all sixteen remaining senior games for Carlton in 2014. He averaged 18 disposals a game and kicked 7 goals for the Blues; his highlight of the year was against his old team, Docherty gathered 30 possessions and kicked a goal.

Carlton were intent on redemption in 2015; however, the Blues slipped even further to endure one of the club's worst-ever seasons, finishing last with 4 wins. Coach Mick Malthouse was sacked in late May and many players were criticised except Docherty, who had improved from previous seasons to average 21 disposals and 6 marks in his 19 games. He finished 6th in the John Nicholls Medal as Carlton's best and fairest player. Docherty would also sign a three-year contract extension during 2015 to keep him at Carlton until the end of the 2018 season. He was also selected in the AFL Players’ Association 2015 22Under22 preliminary squad.

Docherty improved again on previous seasons during 2016, he would go on to play all 22 games for the Blues under new coach Brendon Bolton. Carlton improved from 2015 to notch up seven wins for the season, three more than last year and the Blues ended up finishing 14th on the ladder. Averaging 25 disposals off half-back, he and Kade Simpson forged a strong partnership in defence, making it much harder for the opposition to score. Docherty was rewarded with the John Nicholls Medal as Carlton's best and fairest player, he was also named in the 40-man squad for the All-Australian team and the AFL Players’ Association’s final 22Under22 team. He also took home Carlton's Most Improved Player award.

2017 saw Docherty continue to perform at an elite level. Docherty led the AFL in kicks, marks and was top 5 in overall meters gained and rebounds from defensive 50. Docherty was rewarded for his stellar season with his maiden All-Australian selection in 2017 in the half back line.

Since the end of 2017, Docherty's career has been interrupted by injury and illness. He injured his left anterior cruciate ligament during pre-season training on 15 November 2017, and missed the entire 2018 AFL season as a result. Despite his injury he was newly endorsed by the playing group as the club's joint vice-captain prior to the season commencing. In October 2018, Docherty and Patrick Cripps were named the new co-captains of the club, but Docherty ruptured his left ACL again during pre-season training on 10 December 2018 and missed the 2019 season as well. Docherty made his return to the field in 2020, playing nearly every match.

Following the 2020 season, Docherty was diagnosed with testicular cancer, and after receiving treatment and chemotherapy in the offseason, returned from round 1, 2021. He played every match until round 15, before a second occurrence of the cancer saw him miss the rest of the season for further treatment. He stepped down as co-captain after 2021, but returned to play full seasons in 2022 – coming second in the club best and fairest – and 2023. Docherty ruptured his right ACL in the first match of the 2024 season; initially expected to miss the rest of the season, he made a faster recovery than usual and was fit to return for the finals six months later.

Docherty retired shortly before the end of the 2025 season, playing a farewell match in round 20.

=== Cancer diagnosis, recovery, and philanthropy ===
Docherty has used his platform to raise awareness and vital funds for cancer research, having recovered twice from testicular cancer. Docherty was awarded the Jim Stynes Community Leadership Award and $20,000 to the charity of his choice for his work in raising funds for cancer research and supporting children's charities.

== Statistics ==
Updated to the end of the 2025 season.

Legend
G	Goals	K	Kicks	D	Disposals	T	Tackles
B	Behinds	H	Handballs	M	Marks
†	Led the league for the season

Season	Team	No.	Games	Totals							Averages (per game)							Votes
Season	Team	No.	Games	G	B	K	H	D	M	T	G	B	K	H	D	M	T	Votes
2012	Brisbane Lions	1	0	—	—	—	—	—	—	—	—	—	—	—	—	—	—	0
2013	Brisbane Lions	1	13	1	2	96	78	174	39	25	0.1	0.2	7.4	6.0	13.4	3.0	1.9	0
2014	Carlton	15	16	7	8	207	90	297	82	43	0.4	0.5	12.9	5.6	18.6	5.1	2.7	0
2015	Carlton	15	19	2	2	260	141	401	116	40	0.1	0.1	13.7	7.4	21.1	6.1	2.1	0
2016	Carlton	15	22	1	2	359	207	566	173	57	0.0	0.1	16.3	9.4	25.7	7.9	2.6	1
2017	Carlton	15	22	3	3	460	153	613	199	72	0.1	0.1	20.9	7.0	27.9	9.0	3.3	5
2018	Carlton	15	0	—	—	—	—	—	—	—	—	—	—	—	—	—	—	0
2019	Carlton	15	0	—	—	—	—	—	—	—	—	—	—	—	—	—	—	0
2020 (Note: The 2020 season was played with 17 home-and-away matches per team (down from 22) and 16-minute quarters with time on (down from 20-minute quarters with time on) due to the impact of the COVID-19 pandemic.)	Carlton	15	16	0	1	215	82	297	83	19	0.0	0.1	13.4	5.1	18.6	5.2	1.2	1
2021	Carlton	15	14	0	0	252	88	340	107	31	0.0	0.0	18.0	6.3	24.3	7.6	2.2	2
2022	Carlton	15	22	3	1	424	201	625	160	73	0.1	0.0	19.3	9.1	28.4	7.3	3.3	9
2023	Carlton	15	23	8	9	359	227	586	138	90	0.3	0.4	15.6	9.9	25.5	6.0	3.9	7
2024	Carlton	15	2	1	0	21	5	26	8	3	0.5	0.0	10.5	2.5	13.0	4.0	1.5	0
2025	Carlton	15	15	5	4	198	106	304	87	41	0.3	0.3	13.2	7.1	20.3	5.8	2.7	0
Career			184	31	32	2851	1378	4229	1192	494	0.2	0.2	15.5	7.5	23.0	6.5	2.7	25
