= List of AFL debuts in 2015 =

The following is the list of players who have debuted either in the Australian Football League (AFL) or for a new club during the 2015 AFL season.

== Summary ==
Summary of debuts in 2015
Club	AFL debuts	Change of club
Adelaide	5	1
Brisbane Lions	5	3
Carlton	6	4
Collingwood	5	4
Essendon	3	4
Fremantle	7	0
Geelong	4	3
Gold Coast	7	3
Greater Western Sydney	3	2
Hawthorn	2	2
Melbourne	8	4
North Melbourne	1	2
Port Adelaide	2	1
Richmond	6	1
St Kilda	6	1
Sydney	4	0
West Coast	5	0
Western Bulldogs	7	3
Total	86	38

== AFL debuts ==
Name	Club	Age at debut	Debut round	Games (in 2015)	Goals (in 2015)	Notes
Clem Smith	Carlton	19 years, 59 days	1	7	0	Pick 60 (2014 national draft)
Kamdyn McIntosh	Richmond	20 years, 364 days	1	23	8	Pick 31 (2012 national draft), round 1 nomination 2015 AFL Rising Star
Jesse Hogan	Melbourne	20 years, 52 days	1	20	44	Pick 2 (2012 Mini draft), round 9 nomination 2015 AFL Rising Star, and winner of the Ron Evans Medal (Rising Star Award)
Angus Brayshaw	Melbourne	19 years, 86 days	1	21	5	Pick 3 (2014 national draft), son of Mark Brayshaw, round 10 nomination 2015 AFL Rising Star
Aaron vandenBerg	Melbourne	23 years, 32 days	1	14	5	Pick 2 (2015 rookie draft)
Adam Saad	Gold Coast	20 years, 255 days	1	16	1	Pick 25 (2015 rookie draft), round 5 nomination 2015 AFL Rising Star
Touk Miller	Gold Coast	19 years, 42 days	1	22	7	Pick 29 (2014 national draft), round 16 nomination 2015 AFL Rising Star
Jarrod Garlett	Gold Coast	18 years, 336 days	1	9	4	Pick 15 (2014 national draft)
Isaac Heeney	Sydney	18 years, 334 days	1	14	16	Pick 18 (2014 national draft), academy selection, round 3 nomination 2015 AFL Rising Star
Jordan De Goey	Collingwood	19 years, 20 days	1	16	6	Pick 5 (2014 national draft), round 20 nomination 2015 AFL Rising Star
Jaden McGrath	Brisbane Lions	18 years, 293 days	1	3	0	Pick 73 (2014 national draft)
Tom Lamb	West Coast	18 years, 167 days	1	1	1	Pick 32 (2014 national draft), son of Wayne Lamb
Jackson Nelson	West Coast	19 years, 20 days	1	11	1	Pick 51 (2014 national draft)
Jack Lonie	St Kilda	18 years, 235 days	1	17	12	Pick 41 (2014 national draft), round 14 nomination 2015 AFL Rising Star
Jack Sinclair	St Kilda	20 years, 53 days	1	18	18	Pick 1 (2015 rookie draft)
Nakia Cockatoo	Geelong	18 years, 165 days	1	11	3	Pick 10 (2014 national draft)
Cory Gregson	Geelong	18 years, 214 days	1	20	13	Pick 47 (2014 national draft), round 6 nomination 2015 AFL Rising Star
Liam Duggan	West Coast	18 years, 120 days	2	12	1	Pick 11 (2014 national draft)
Kane Lambert	Richmond	23 years, 136 days	2	13	8	Pick 46 (2015 rookie draft)
James Sicily	Hawthorn	20 years, 97 days	2	3	4	Pick 56 (2013 national draft)
Paddy McCartin	St Kilda	18 years, 363 days	3	6	3	Pick 1 (2014 national draft)
Jake Kelly	Adelaide	20 years, 88 days	3	10	0	Pick 40 (2014 rookie draft), son of Craig Kelly
Ciarán Byrne	Carlton	20 years, 133 days	3	1	0	Pick 64 (2014 rookie draft)
Brendon Ah Chee	Port Adelaide	21 years, 118 days	3	11	6	Pick 45 (2011 national draft)
Harris Andrews	Brisbane Lions	18 years, 128 days	3	19	4	Pick 61 (2014 national draft), academy selection, round 18 nomination 2015 AFL Rising Star
Lukas Webb	Western Bulldogs	19 years, 46 days	3	10	1	Pick 27 (2014 national draft)
Nathan Drummond	Richmond	20 years, 96 days	4	1	0	Pick 52 (2014 national draft)
Blaine Boekhorst	Carlton	21 years, 235 days	4	11	5	Pick 19 (2014 national draft)
Matthew Dick	Carlton	20 years, 173 days	4	6	0	Delisted free agent, (2014 national draft), from Sydney
Fraser McInnes	West Coast	21 years, 281 days	4	7	6	Pick 28 (2011 national draft)
Trent Dumont	North Melbourne	19 years, 300 days	4	8	2	Pick 30 (2013 national draft)
Corey Ellis	Richmond	18 years, 205 days	5	6	3	Pick 12 (2014 national draft)
Josh Glenn	Gold Coast	21 years, 54 days	5	5	1	Pick 7 (2015 rookie draft)
Henry Schade	Gold Coast	21 years, 206 days	5	15	0	Pick 24 (2011 national draft)
Kyle Langford	Essendon	18 years, 153 days	5	8	3	Pick 17 (2014 national draft)
Daniel McKenzie	St Kilda	18 years, 351 days	5	7	0	Pick 22 (2014 national draft)
Jake Lever	Adelaide	19 years, 065 days	6	12	0	Pick 14 (2014 national draft), round 17 nomination 2015 AFL Rising Star
Alex Pearce	Fremantle	19 years, 334 days	6	13	3	Pick 37 (2013 national draft)
Billy Stretch	Melbourne	18 years, 243 days	6	11	2	Pick 42 (2014 national draft), son of Steven Stretch
Bailey Dale	Western Bulldogs	18 years, 299 days	7	10	6	Pick 45 (2014 national draft)
Liam McBean	Richmond	20 years, 265 days	7	2	0	Pick 33 (2012 national draft)
Connor Menadue	Richmond	18 years, 240 days	7	5	1	Pick 33 (2014 national draft)
Karl Amon	Port Adelaide	19 years, 271 days	7	7	5	Pick 68 (2013 national draft)
Liam Dawson	Brisbane Lions	19 years, 122 days	8	10	1	Pick 44 (2014 national draft), academy selection
Dan Robinson	Sydney	20 years, 330 days	9	4	2	Pick 50 (2013 rookie draft)
Daniel Howe	Hawthorn	19 years, 177 days	9	4	0	Pick 31 (2014 national draft)
Keegan Brooksby	Gold Coast	25 years, 034 days	9	3	3	Pick 42 (2015 rookie draft)
Joel Hamling	Western Bulldogs	22 years, 052 days	9	11	0	Previously on Geelong playing list, signed as a delisted free agent in 2014
Peter Wright	Gold Coast	18 years, 271 days	10	3	1	Pick 8 (2014 national draft)
Toby McLean	Western Bulldogs	19 years, 127 days	10	4	2	Pick 26 (2014 national draft)
Michael Luxford	Geelong	20 years, 104 days	10	2	0	Pick 56 (2014 rookie draft)
Hugh Beasley	Brisbane Lions	19 years, 207 days	10	6	0	Pick 22 (2014 national draft)
Alex Neal-Bullen	Melbourne	19 years, 157 days	12	11	6	Pick 40 (2014 national draft)
Jack Steele	Greater Western Sydney	19 years, 189 days	12	7	1	Pick 24 (2014 national draft), academy selection
Caleb Marchbank	Greater Western Sydney	19 years, 195 days	12	5	0	Pick 6 (2014 national draft)
Jake Kolodjashnij	Geelong	19 years, 316 days	12	9	0	Pick 41 (2013 national draft), brother of Kade Kolodjashnij
Toby Nankervis	Sydney	20 years, 324 days	14	5	1	Pick 35 (2013 national draft)
Brayden Maynard	Collingwood	18 years, 286 days	14	9	2	Pick 30 (2014 national draft), son of Peter Maynard
Darcy Moore	Collingwood	19 years, 160 days	14	9	9	Pick 9 (2014 national draft), son of Peter Moore
Caleb Daniel	Western Bulldogs	18 years, 362 days	14	10	6	Pick 46 (2014 national draft), round 4 nomination 2016 AFL Rising Star
Tom Fields	Carlton	22 years, 203 days	15	2	0	Pick 41 (2015 rookie draft), son of Neville Fields
Jayden Laverde	Essendon	19 years, 90 days	15	9	5	Pick 20 (2014 national draft)
James Harmes	Melbourne	19 years, 279 days	15	8	3	Pick 2 (2014 rookie draft), round 7 nomination 2016 AFL Rising Star
Josh Prudden	Western Bulldogs	20 years, 308 days	15	4	0	Pick 50 (2012 national draft)
Riley Knight	Adelaide	20 years, 107 days	15	11	8	Pick 46 (2013 national draft)
Brad Walsh	Carlton	18 years, 318 days	16	3	1	Pick 24 (2015 rookie draft)
Rory Atkins	Adelaide	21 years, 7 days	16	8	4	Pick 81 (2012 national draft)
Hugh Goddard	St Kilda	18 years, 329 days	16	8	1	Pick 21 (2014 national draft), cousin of Brendon Goddard
Tom Barrass	West Coast	19 years, 291 days	17	3	0	Pick 43 (2013 national draft)
Matthew Scharenberg	Collingwood	19 years, 317 days	18	4	0	Pick 6 (2013 national draft)
Lachie Weller	Fremantle	19 years, 161 days	18	3	0	Pick 13 (2014 national draft), brother of Maverick Weller
Jonathon Marsh	Collingwood	19 years, 295 days	19	5	0	Pick 77 (2013 national draft)
Billy Evans	Brisbane Lions	18 years, 293 days	19	5	1	Pick 4 (2015 rookie draft)
James Rose	Sydney	19 years, 128 days	21	2	3	Pick 37 (2014 national draft)
Jason Holmes	St Kilda	25 years, 298 days	21	3	0	Pick 36 (2014 rookie draft)
Roarke Smith	Western Bulldogs	18 years, 346 days	21	1	0	Pick 5 (2015 rookie draft)
Zaine Cordy	Western Bulldogs	18 years, 306 days	22	2	0	Pick 62 (2014 national draft), brother of Ayce Cordy, son of Brian Cordy
Conor McKenna	Essendon	19 years, 154 days	22	2	2	Pick 62 (2015 rookie draft)
Ed Langdon	Fremantle	19 years, 211 days	22	2	0	Pick 54 (2014 national draft), brother of Tom Langdon
Oscar McDonald	Melbourne	19 years, 165 days	22	2	0	Pick 53 (2014 national draft), brother of Tom McDonald
Connor Blakely	Fremantle	19 years, 187 days	23	1	0	Pick 34 (2014 national draft)
Brady Grey	Fremantle	20 years, 48 days	23	1	0	Pick 58 (2013 national draft)
Ethan Hughes	Fremantle	20 years, 272 days	23	1	0	Pick 13 (2014 national draft)
Jacob Ballard	Fremantle	20 years, 192 days	23	1	0	Pick 47 (2014 rookie draft)
Mitch White	Melbourne	19 years, 149 days	23	1	0	Pick 20 (2015 rookie draft)
Jake Barrett	Greater Western Sydney	19 years, 302 days	23	1	0	Pick 97 (2013 national draft), NSW Zone selection

== Change of AFL club ==
Name	Club	Age at debut	Debut round	Games (in 2015)	Goals (in 2015)	Notes
Taylor Hunt	Richmond	24 years, 148 days	1	23	1	Previously played for Geelong, signed as a delisted free agent in 2014
Liam Jones	Carlton	24 years, 38 days	1	9	7	Previously played for Western Bulldogs, traded in 2014
Kristian Jaksch	Carlton	20 years, 177 days	1	6	1	Previously played for Greater Western Sydney, traded in 2014
Heritier Lumumba	Melbourne	28 years, 140 days	1	19	2	Previously played for Collingwood, traded in 2014
Sam Frost	Melbourne	21 years, 219 days	1	3	0	Previously played for Greater Western Sydney, traded in 2014
Ben Newton	Melbourne	22 years, 239 days	1	11	11	Previously played for Port Adelaide, signed as a delisted free agent in 2014
Jeff Garlett	Melbourne	25 years, 244 days	1	22	40	Previously played for Carlton, traded in 2014
Mitch Hallahan	Gold Coast	22 years, 244 day	1	12	3	Previously played for Hawthorn, traded in 2014
Nick Malceski	Gold Coast	30 years, 232 days	1	16	3	Previously played for Sydney, signed as an unrestricted free agent in 2014
Adam Cooney	Essendon	26 years, 359 days	1	11	10	Previously played for Western Bulldogs, traded in 2014
Travis Varcoe	Collingwood	26 years, 335 days	1	22	10	Previously played for Geelong, traded in 2014
Jack Crisp	Collingwood	21 years, 184 days	1	22	16	Previously played for Brisbane Lions, traded in 2014
Allen Christensen	Brisbane Lions	23 years, 320 days	1	22	19	Previously played for Geelong, traded in 2014
Mitch Robinson	Brisbane Lions	25 years, 301 days	1	21	10	Previously played for Carlton, signed as a delisted free agent in 2014
Dayne Beams	Brisbane Lions	25 years, 52 days	1	16	10	Previously played for Collingwood, traded in 2014
Tom Boyd	Western Bulldogs	19 years, 225 days	1	14	16	Previously played for Greater Western Sydney, traded in 2014
Tim Membrey	St Kilda	20 years, 314 days	1	12	9	Previously played for Sydney, signed as a delisted free agent in 2014
Joel Patfull	Greater Western Sydney	30 years, 119 days	1	16	1	Previously played for Brisbane Lions, traded in 2014
Ryan Griffen	Greater Western Sydney	28 years, 252 days	1	21	7	Previously played for Western Bulldogs, traded in 2014
Kyle Cheney	Adelaide	25 years, 223 days	1	12	0	Previously played for Melbourne & Hawthorn, traded in 2014
Jarrad Waite	North Melbourne	32 years, 62 days	1	22	42	Previously played for Carlton, signed as an unrestricted free agent in 2014
Shaun Higgins	North Melbourne	27 years, 32 days	1	23	37	Previously played for Western Bulldogs, signed as a restricted free agent in 2014
Paddy Ryder	Port Adelaide	27 years, 22 days	1	18	18	Previously played for Essendon, traded in 2014
James Frawley	Hawthorn	26 years, 198 days	1	16	6	Previously played for Melbourne, signed as an unrestricted free agent in 2014
Mitch Clark	Geelong	27 years, 169 days	1	8	14	Previously played for Brisbane Lions & Melbourne, traded in 2014
Jason Tutt	Carlton	23 years, 330 days	2	13	4	Previously played for Western Bulldogs, pick 2 (2015 Pre-Season Draft)
Rhys Stanley	Geelong	24 years, 132 days	2	8	6	Previously played for St Kilda, traded in 2014
Jonathan O'Rourke	Hawthorn	20 years, 356 days	2	2	1	Previously played for Greater Western Sydney, traded in 2014
James Gwilt	Essendon	28 years, 244 days	2	11	0	Previously played for St Kilda, signed as an unrestricted free agent in 2014
Patrick Karnezis	Collingwood	22 years, 359 days	3	4	2	Previously played for Brisbane Lions, traded in 2013
Mark Whiley	Carlton	22 years, 151 days	5	8	1	Previously played for Greater Western Sydney, traded in 2014
Andrew Raines	Gold Coast	29 years, 63 days	6	6	2	Previously played for Brisbane Lions, pick 71, (2015 rookie draft)
Shaun McKernan	Essendon	24 years, 256 days	7	9	6	Previously played for Adelaide, pick 12, (2015 rookie draft)
Sam Blease	Geelong	24 years, 87 days	7	1	0	Previously played for Melbourne, signed as a delisted free agent in 2014
Shane Biggs	Western Bulldogs	23 years, 292 days	8	10	3	Previously played for Sydney, traded in 2014
Shaun Edwards	Essendon	21 years, 182 days	11	9	8	Previously played for Greater Western Sydney, traded in 2013
Levi Greenwood	Collingwood	26 years, 150 days	16	8	4	Previously played for North Melbourne, traded in 2014
Jonathan Giles	Essendon	27 years, 207 days	18	3	1	Previously played for Greater Western Sydney, traded in 2014
