= 2014 AFL draft =

Draft for the Australian Football League

General information
- Dates: 27 November 2014; 3 December 2014
- Time: 5:00 pm AEST (27 November); 11:00 am AEDT (3 December)
- Location: Gold Coast Convention Centre, Gold Coast, Queensland
- Network: Fox Footy
- Sponsored by: National Australia Bank

Overview
- League: AFL
- First selection: Paddy McCartin (St Kilda)

The 2014 AFL draft consists of the various periods where the 18 clubs in the Australian Football League (AFL) can trade and recruit players following the completion of the 2014 AFL season. Additions to each club's playing list are not allowed at any other time during the year. This was the last year in which any team passed on a selection in the national draft.

The key dates for the trading and drafting periods are:

- The free agency offer period between 3 October and 13 October. Three further free agency periods are held for delisted players, between 1 November and 12 November, 14 November to 19 November and 28 November to 1 December.
- Father–son and academy players were nominated by 3 October, with a bidding process held on 6 October.
- The trade period; which was held between 6 October and 16 October
- The 2014 national draft; which was conducted on 27 November 2014 at the Gold Coast Convention Centre.
- The 2015 pre-season draft which was held on 3 December 2014 and
- The 2015 rookie draft, also held on 3 December 2014.

Final club lists for the 2015 AFL season were lodged to the AFL on 5 December 2014.

The 2014 draft was the best draft from a NSW/ACT perspective in recent history, as there were as many as seven players recruited from the region. Isaac Heeney was taken at pick 18, followed by Jack Hiscox, Abe Davis, Jack Steele, Dougal Howard, Logan Austin and Jeremy Finlayson. This total of seven new recruits (Dan Robinson was a rookie upgrade) was just one player less than what was recruited from the traditional football state of Western Australia.

== Player movements ==
=== Free agency ===
The initial list of free agents, published in March 2014, consisted of 48 unrestricted free agents and nine restricted free agents. The mid-year revision in July listed 27 unrestricted free agents and only two restricted free agents, due to players re-signing with their existing clubs or announcing their retirement.

The final free agents list issued on 29 September, the week before the trade period commenced, consisted of 13 unrestricted free agents and only Shaun Higgins on the restricted free agent list, reflecting that most of the original list had either re-signed with their current club or retired from the AFL. James Frawley, Jarrad Waite, Dustin Fletcher, Brad Sewell, Luke McPharlin, Adam Goodes and Nick Malceski were the highest profile players remaining on the list.

2014 AFL free agency period signings
Player	Date	Free agent type	Former club	New club	Compensation	Ref
Jarrad Waite	3 October 2014	Unrestricted	Carlton	North Melbourne	None	
Shaun Higgins	3 October 2014	Restricted	Western Bulldogs	North Melbourne	2nd round	
James Frawley	6 October 2014	Unrestricted	Melbourne	Hawthorn	1st round	
Nick Malceski	6 October 2014	Unrestricted	Sydney	Gold Coast	2nd round	
James Gwilt	11 October 2014	Unrestricted	St Kilda	Essendon	None	
Taylor Hunt	2 November 2014	Delisted	Geelong	Richmond	None	
Tim Membrey	5 November 2014	Delisted	Sydney	St Kilda	None	
Joel Hamling	2 November 2014	Delisted	Geelong	Western Bulldogs	None	
Sam Blease	3 November 2014	Delisted	Melbourne	Geelong	None	
Mitch Robinson	3 November 2014	Delisted	Carlton	Brisbane Lions	None	
Ben Newton	5 November 2014	Delisted	Port Adelaide	Melbourne	None	
Matthew Dick	5 November 2014	Delisted	Sydney	Carlton	None	

=== Trades ===
The AFL trade period will run from Monday 6 October until Thursday 16 October. The AFL announced that it was shortening the trade period by one day from the usual Friday deadline due to Etihad Stadium, which is used by the AFL clubs during the trade period, being booked on the Friday for the International Convention of Jehovah's Witnesses.

On 9 October it was revealed that the AFL had banned the Sydney Swans from recruiting players, either by trading or through free agency signing, for the next two trading periods (until the end of the 2016 season), unless the club was prepared to give up its cost of living allowance (COLA), the allowance above the base salary cap which the club is permitted to pay its players to reflect the higher cost of living in Sydney compared with Melbourne. Sydney opted to abide by the restrictions in order to retain its COLA, and recruited no players. The club was not restricted from receiving draft picks in exchange for players leaving the club.

2014 AFL trade period
#	Player(s)	Traded from	Traded to	Traded for	Ref
1	Jonathan O'Rourke; Pick 43	Greater Western Sydney	Hawthorn	Pick 19; Pick 40	
2	Jeff Garlett; Pick 83	Carlton	Melbourne	Pick 61; Pick 79	
3	Joel Patfull	Brisbane Lions	Greater Western Sydney	Pick 21	
4	Allen Christensen	Geelong	Brisbane Lions	Pick 21	
5	Heritier Lumumba	Collingwood	Melbourne	Mitch Clark	
5	Mitch Clark	Melbourne	Geelong	Travis Varcoe	
5	Travis Varcoe	Geelong	Collingwood	Heritier Lumumba	
6	Dayne Beams; Pick 67	Collingwood	Brisbane Lions	Jack Crisp; Pick 5 Pick 25	
7	Levi Greenwood	North Melbourne	Collingwood	Pick 25	
8	Rhys Stanley; Pick 60	St Kilda	Geelong	Pick 21	
9	Kristian Jaksch; Mark Whiley; Pick 19	Greater Western Sydney	Carlton	Pick 7	
10	Ryan Griffen; Pick 6	Western Bulldogs	Greater Western Sydney	Tom Boyd	
11	Jonathan Giles; Pick 62	Greater Western Sydney	Essendon	Pick 53	
12	Paddy Ryder	Essendon	Port Adelaide	Pick 17; Pick 37	
13	Adam Cooney	Western Bulldogs	Essendon	Pick 37	
14	Mitch Hallahan	Hawthorn	Gold Coast	Pick 47; Pick 49	
15	Sam Frost; Pick 40; Pick 53	Greater Western Sydney	Melbourne	Pick 23	
16	Shane Biggs; Pick 39	Sydney	Western Bulldogs	Pick 37	
17	Liam Jones	Western Bulldogs	Carlton	Pick 46	
18	Kyle Cheney; Luke Lowden; Pick 43; Pick 47; Pick 59	Hawthorn	Adelaide	Pick 31; Pick 50; Pick 68	
19	Pick 10; Pick 47	Adelaide	Geelong	Pick 14; Pick 35	

Note: The numbering of the draft picks in this list may be different to the agreed draft picks at the time of the trade, due to adjustments from either the insertion of free agency compensation draft picks or clubs exiting the draft before later rounds.

=== Retirements and delistings ===
List of 2014 AFL player changes

Name	Club	Date	Notes
Campbell Brown	Gold Coast	5 December 2013	Sacked after punching teammate Steven May
Nick Duigan	Carlton	9 December 2013	Retired due to ongoing injury, effective immediately
Dayle Garlett	Hawthorn	25 March 2014	Retired due to struggles with the demands of AFL football, effective immediately
Heath Scotland	Carlton	20 May 2014	Retired due to an ongoing ankle injury, effective immediately
Josh Bootsma	Carlton	3 June 2014	Sacked due to breaches in club and AFL's code of conduct
Darren Glass	West Coast	12 June 2014	Retired due to ongoing injury, effective immediately
Jonathan Brown	Brisbane Lions	23 June 2014	Retired due to repeated head injuries, effective immediately
Ben Rutten	Adelaide	1 July 2014	Retired, effective at the end of the season
Tom Williams	Western Bulldogs	9 July 2014	Retired due to ongoing injury, effective immediately
Lenny Hayes	St Kilda	15 July 2014	Retired, effective at the end of the season
Nick Maxwell	Collingwood	16 July 2014	Retired due to ongoing injury, effective immediately
Dom Cassisi	Port Adelaide	17 July 2014	Retired, effective at the end of round 18
Dean Cox	West Coast	21 July 2014	Retired, effective at the end of the season
Beau Maister	St Kilda	22 July 2014	Retired due to a shoulder injury, effective immediately
Jake King	Richmond	28 July 2014	Retired due to ongoing injury, effective immediately
Nathan Bock	Gold Coast	29 July 2014	Retired due to ongoing injury, effective immediately
Shannon Byrnes	Melbourne	30 July 2014	Retired due to ongoing injury, effective immediately
Jason Winderlich	Essendon	6 August 2014	Retired, effective at the end of the season
Brent Moloney	Brisbane Lions	11 August 2014	Retired due to ongoing injury, effective immediately
Tom Murphy	Gold Coast	12 August 2014	Retired, effective at the end of the season
Lewis Roberts-Thomson	Sydney	14 August 2014	Retired, effective immediately
Ashley McGrath	Brisbane Lions	21 August 2014	Retired, effective at the end of round 22
Kepler Bradley	Fremantle	21 August 2014	Retired, effective at the end of the season
Maia Westrupp	Melbourne	21 August 2014	Quit to return to New Zealand
Quinten Lynch	Collingwood	22 August 2014	Retired, effective at the end of the season
Stephen Gilham	Greater Western Sydney	26 August 2014	Retired, effective at the end of the season
Josh Hunt	Greater Western Sydney	26 August 2014	Retired, effective at the end of the season
Andrew Raines	Brisbane Lions	27 August 2014	Delisted
Karmichael Hunt	Gold Coast	28 August 2014	Quit to return to Rugby, joined Queensland Reds
Daniel Giansiracusa	Western Bulldogs	28 August 2014	Retired, effective at the end of the season
Luke Ball	Collingwood	28 August 2014	Retired, effective at the end of the season
James Gwilt	St Kilda	31 August 2014	Delisted
Clinton Jones	St Kilda	31 August 2014	Delisted
James Polkinghorne	Brisbane Lions	1 September 2014	Delisted
Jordan Lisle	Brisbane Lions	1 September 2014	Delisted
Patrick Wearden	Brisbane Lions	1 September 2014	Delisted
Nick Hayes	Brisbane Lions	1 September 2014	Delisted
Sam Michael	Brisbane Lions	1 September 2014	Delisted
Isaac Conway	Brisbane Lions	1 September 2014	Delisted
Scott Gumbleton	Fremantle	1 September 2014	Retired, effective immediately
Jackson Allen	Gold Coast	2 September 2014	Delisted
Jack Hutchins	Gold Coast	2 September 2014	Delisted
Jeremy Taylor	Gold Coast	2 September 2014	Delisted
Matthew Warnock	Gold Coast	2 September 2014	Delisted
Leigh Osborne	Gold Coast	2 September 2014	Delisted
Andrew McInnes	Carlton	2 September 2014	Delisted
Tom Temay	Carlton	2 September 2014	Delisted
Jaryd Cachia	Carlton	2 September 2014	Delisted
Luke Reynolds	Carlton	2 September 2014	Delisted
Daniel Nicholson	Melbourne	2 September 2014	Delisted
Mitch Clisby	Melbourne	2 September 2014	Delisted
Trent Dennis-Lane	St Kilda	2 September 2014	Delisted
Sam Dunell	St Kilda	2 September 2014	Delisted
Caolan Mooney	Collingwood	4 September 2014	Quit to return to Ireland
Marty Clarke	Collingwood	4 September 2014	Quit to return to Ireland
Peter Yagmoor	Collingwood	4 September 2014	Delisted
Ben Hudson	Collingwood	4 September 2014	Retired, effective immediately
Daniel Jackson	Richmond	5 September 2014	Retired, effective immediately
Shaun McKernan	Adelaide	6 September 2014	Delisted
Angus Graham	Adelaide	6 September 2014	Delisted
Aaron Edwards	Richmond	9 September 2014	Delisted
Brett O'Hanlon	Richmond	9 September 2014	Delisted
Brad Helbig	Richmond	9 September 2014	Delisted
Orren Stephenson	Richmond	9 September 2014	Delisted
Ben Darrou	Richmond	9 September 2014	Delisted
Cadeyn Williams	Richmond	9 September 2014	Delisted
Todd Banfield	Richmond	9 September 2014	Delisted
Ryan O'Keefe	Sydney	24 September 2014	Retired, effective immediately
Brett Goodes	Western Bulldogs	24 September 2014	Delisted
Christian Howard	Western Bulldogs	24 September 2014	Delisted
Tom Young	Western Bulldogs	24 September 2014	Delisted
Brent Renouf	Port Adelaide	24 September 2014	Delisted
Cameron Hitchcock	Port Adelaide	24 September 2014	Delisted
Campbell Heath	Port Adelaide	24 September 2014	Delisted
Nick Bourke	Geelong	25 September 2014	Delisted
George Burbury	Geelong	25 September 2014	Delisted
Jordan Schroder	Geelong	25 September 2014	Delisted
Jackson Sheringham	Geelong	25 September 2014	Delisted
Jesse Stringer	Geelong	25 September 2014	Delisted
Ashley Smith	West Coast	30 September 2014	Delisted
Jacob Brennan	West Coast	30 September 2014	Delisted
Sam Menegola	Fremantle	1 October 2014	Delisted
Michael Wood	Fremantle	1 October 2014	Delisted
Jordan Lockyer	Sydney	1 October 2014	Delisted
Matthew Dick	Sydney	1 October 2014	Delisted, signed by Carlton as a Free Agent
Tommy Walsh	Sydney	1 October 2014	Quit to return to Ireland
Patrick Mitchell	Sydney	3 October 2014	Quit to return to the USA
Brad Sewell	Hawthorn	4 October 2014	Retired
Kyle Martin	Collingwood	4 October 2014	Retired
Jordan Kelly	Hawthorn	9 October 2014	Delisted
Derick Wanganeen	Hawthorn	9 October 2014	Delisted
Ben Ross	Hawthorn	9 October 2014	Delisted
Jason Porplyzia	Adelaide	10 October 2014	Retired
Jared Petrenko	Adelaide	10 October 2014	Delisted
Lewis Johnston	Adelaide	10 October 2014	Delisted
Luke Thompson	Adelaide	17 October 2014	Delisted
Alex Spina	Adelaide	17 October 2014	Delisted
James Battersby	Adelaide	17 October 2014	Delisted
Taylor Hunt	Geelong	21 October 2014	Delisted, signed by Richmond as a Free Agent
Mitch Brown	Geelong	21 October 2014	Delisted
Joel Hamling	Geelong	21 October 2014	Delisted, signed by Western Bulldogs as a Free Agent
Mitch Robinson	Carlton	21 October 2014	Delisted, signed by Brisbane Lions as a Free Agent
Brock McLean	Carlton	21 October 2014	Delisted
Kane Lucas	Carlton	21 October 2014	Delisted
Josh Simpson	Fremantle	21 October 2014	Delisted
Leroy Jetta	Essendon	22 October 2014	Delisted
Kyle Hardingham	Essendon	22 October 2014	Delisted
Sean Gregory	Essendon	22 October 2014	Delisted
Johnny Rayne	Essendon	22 October 2014	Delisted
Sam Blease	Melbourne	22 October 2014	Delisted, signed by Geelong as a Free Agent
James Strauss	Melbourne	22 October 2014	Delisted
Alex Georgiou	Melbourne	23 October 2014	Delisted
Adam Carter	West Coast	24 October 2014	Delisted
Blayne Wilson	West Coast	24 October 2014	Delisted
Ben Newton	Port Adelaide	24 October 2014	Delisted, signed by Melbourne as a Free Agent
Tom Logan	Port Adelaide	24 October 2014	Delisted
Lewis Stevenson	Port Adelaide	24 October 2014	Delisted
Mark Austin	Western Bulldogs	27 October 2014	Delisted
Alex Greenwood	Western Bulldogs	27 October 2014	Delisted
Adam Schneider	St Kilda	28 October 2014	Delisted, but is expected to re-drafted as a rookie
Terry Milera	St Kilda	28 October 2014	Delisted
Cory Dell’Olio	Essendon	29 October 2014	Delisted
Dylan van Unen	Essendon	29 October 2014	Delisted
Fraser Thurlow	Essendon	29 October 2014	Delisted
Kurt Aylett	Essendon	30 October 2014	Delisted, but is expected to re-drafted as a rookie
Liam Anthony	North Melbourne	31 October 2014	Delisted
Taylor Hine	North Melbourne	31 October 2014	Delisted
Robin Nahas	North Melbourne	31 October 2014	Delisted
Mitch Wilkins	North Melbourne	31 October 2014	Delisted
Tom Curran	North Melbourne	31 October 2014	Delisted
Cameron Delaney	North Melbourne	31 October 2014	Delisted
Tim McGenniss	North Melbourne	31 October 2014	Delisted
Max Warren	North Melbourne	31 October 2014	Delisted
Tony Armstrong	Collingwood	31 October 2014	Delisted, but is expected to re-drafted as a rookie
Luke Tapscott	Melbourne	31 October 2014	Delisted

== 2014 national draft ==
The 2014 AFL national draft was held on 27 November 2014 at the Gold Coast Convention Centre.

Final draft order

^	Denotes player who has been inducted to the Australian Football Hall of Fame
*	Denotes player who has been a premiership player and been selected for at least one All-Australian team
^{+}	Denotes player who has been a premiership player at least once
^{x}	Denotes player who has been selected for at least one All-Australian team
^{#}	Denotes player who has never played in a VFL/AFL home and away season or finals game
^{~}	Denotes player who has been selected as Rising Star

Round	Pick	Player	Drafted to	Recruited from	League	Notes
1	1	Paddy McCartin	St Kilda	Geelong Falcons	TAC Cup	
1	2	Christian Petracca*	Melbourne	Eastern Ranges	TAC Cup	
1	3	Angus Brayshaw	Melbourne	Sandringham Dragons	TAC Cup	Free agency compensation pick (Frawley)
1	4	Jarrod Pickett	Greater Western Sydney	South Fremantle	WAFL	
1	5	Jordan De Goey	Collingwood	Oakleigh Chargers	TAC Cup	Traded from Brisbane Lions
1	6	Caleb Marchbank	Greater Western Sydney	Murray Bushrangers	TAC Cup	Traded from Western Bulldogs
1	7	Paul Ahern	Greater Western Sydney	Calder Cannons	TAC Cup	Traded from Carlton
1	8	Peter Wright	Gold Coast	Calder Cannons	TAC Cup	
1	9	Darcy Moore	Collingwood	Oakleigh Chargers	TAC Cup	Father–son rule selection – son of Peter Moore
1	10	Nakia Cockatoo	Geelong	NT Thunder	NEAFL	Traded from Adelaide
1	11	Liam Duggan	West Coast	Western Jets	TAC Cup	
1	12	Corey Ellis	Richmond	Western Jets	TAC Cup	
1	13	Lachie Weller	Fremantle	Southport/Broadbeach	NEAFL	
1	14	Jake Lever	Adelaide	Calder Cannons	TAC Cup	Traded from Geelong
1	15	Jarrod Garlett	Gold Coast	South Fremantle	WAFL	Traded from Geelong; compensation pick from 2012 (Ablett)
1	16	Sam Durdin	North Melbourne	West Adelaide	SANFL	
1	17	Kyle Langford	Essendon	Northern Knights	TAC Cup	Traded from Port Adelaide
1	18	Isaac Heeney	Sydney	Cardiff	BDAFL	Academy player
1	19	Blaine Boekhorst	Carlton	Swan Districts	WAFL	Traded from Greater Western Sydney; received from Hawthorn
1	20	Jayden Laverde	Essendon	Western Jets	TAC Cup	First selection at end of first round due to supplements scandal penalty
1	21	Hugh Goddard	St Kilda	Geelong Falcons	TAC Cup	Traded from Geelong; received from Brisbane Lions; received from Greater Western Sydney; received from Gold Coast via a trade in 2012; traded by Brisbane Lions in 2010; Compensation pick from 2010 (Brennan)
2	22	Daniel McKenzie	St Kilda	Oakleigh Chargers	TAC Cup	
2	23	Pat McKenna	Greater Western Sydney	Gisborne	Bendigo Football League	Traded from Melbourne
2	24	Jack Steele	Greater Western Sydney	Belconnen	NEAFL	Academy player
2	25	Daniel Nielson	North Melbourne	Eastern Ranges	TAC Cup	Traded from Collingwood; received from Brisbane Lions
2	26	Toby McLean	Western Bulldogs	Oakleigh Chargers	TAC Cup	
2	27	Lukas Webb	Western Bulldogs	Gippsland Power	TAC Cup	Free agency compensation pick (Higgins)
2	28	Dillon Viojo-Rainbow	Carlton	Western Jets	TAC Cup	
2	29	Touk Miller	Gold Coast	Calder Cannons	TAC Cup	
2	30	Brayden Maynard	Collingwood	Sandringham Dragons	TAC Cup	
2	31	Daniel Howe	Hawthorn	Murray Bushrangers	TAC Cup	Traded from Adelaide
2	32	Tom Lamb	West Coast	Dandenong Stingrays	TAC Cup	
2	33	Connor Menadue	Richmond	Western Jets	TAC Cup	
2	34	Connor Blakely	Fremantle	Swan Districts	WAFL	
2	35	Harrison Wigg	Adelaide	North Adelaide	SANFL	Traded from Geelong
2	36	Ed Vickers-Willis	North Melbourne	Sandringham Dragons	TAC Cup	
2	37	James Rose	Sydney	Sturt	SANFL	Traded from Western Bulldogs; received from Essendon; received from Port Adelaide
2	38	Jack Hiscox	Sydney	Sydney University	NEAFL	Academy player
2	39	Declan Hamilton	Western Bulldogs	Port Adelaide	SANFL	Traded from Sydney; Free agency compensation pick (Malceski)
2	40	Alex Neal-Bullen	Melbourne	Glenelg	SANFL	Traded from Greater Western Sydney; received from Hawthorn
3	41	Jack Lonie	St Kilda	Dandenong Stingrays	TAC Cup	
3	42	Billy Stretch	Melbourne	Glenelg	SANFL	Father–son rule selection – son of Steven Stretch
3	43	Mitch McGovern	Adelaide	Claremont	WAFL	Traded from Hawthorn; received from Greater Western Sydney
3	44	Liam Dawson	Brisbane Lions	Aspley	NEAFL	Academy player
3	45	Bailey Dale	Western Bulldogs	Dandenong Stingrays	TAC Cup	
3	46	Caleb Daniel	Western Bulldogs	South Adelaide	SANFL	Traded by Carlton
3	47	Cory Gregson	Geelong	Glenelg	SANFL	Traded from Adelaide; received from Hawthorn; received from Gold Coast
3	48	Matthew Goodyear	Collingwood	Calder Cannons	TAC Cup	
3	49	Teia Miles	Hawthorn	Geelong Falcons	TAC Cup	Traded from Gold Coast; received from West Coast via a trade in 2013; traded by Collingwood in 2010; Compensation pick from 2010 (Fraser)
3	50	Marc Pittonet	Hawthorn	Oakleigh Chargers	TAC Cup	Traded by Adelaide
3	51	Jackson Nelson	West Coast	Geelong Falcons	TAC Cup	
3	52	Nathan Drummond	Richmond	Murray Bushrangers	TAC Cup	
3	53	Oscar McDonald	Melbourne	North Ballarat Rebels	TAC Cup	Traded from Greater Western Sydney; received from Essendon
3	54	Ed Langdon	Fremantle	Sandringham Dragons	TAC Cup	
3	55	Dean Gore	Geelong	Sturt	SANFL	
3	56	Dougal Howard	Port Adelaide	Murray Bushrangers	TAC Cup	
3	57	Passed	Sydney	—	—	
3	58	Harry Dear	Adelaide	Sandringham Dragons	TAC Cup	Traded by Hawthorn
4	59	Jordan Cunico	Geelong	Gippsland Power	TAC Cup	Traded by St Kilda
4	60	Clem Smith	Carlton	Perth	WAFL	Traded from Melbourne
4	61	Harris Andrews	Brisbane Lions	Aspley	NEAFL	Academy player
4	62	Zaine Cordy	Western Bulldogs	Geelong Falcons	TAC Cup	Father–son rule selection – son of Brian Cordy
4	63	Jayden Foster	Carlton	Calder Cannons	TAC Cup	
4	64	Passed	Gold Coast	—	—	
4	65	Josh Watts	Brisbane Lions	Glenorchy	TSL	Traded by Collingwood
4	66	Damien Cavka	West Coast	Calder Cannons	TAC Cup	
4	67	Dan Butler	Richmond	North Ballarat Rebels	TAC Cup	
4	68	Josh Deluca	Fremantle	Subiaco	WAFL	
4	69	Logan Austin	Port Adelaide	Belconnen	NEAFL	
4	70	Abe Davis	Sydney	UNSW-Eastern Suburbs	Sydney AFL	Academy player
5	71	Passed	Carlton	—	—	Traded from Melbourne
5	72	Passed	Greater Western Sydney	—	—	
5	73	Jaden McGrath	Brisbane Lions	Bendigo Pioneers	TAC Cup	
5	74	Passed	Gold Coast	—	—	
5	75	Passed	Collingwood	—	—	
5	76	Alec Waterman	West Coast	Claremont	WAFL	Father–son rule selection – son of Chris Waterman
5	77	Reece McKenzie	Richmond	Northern Knights	TAC Cup	
5	78	Jesse Palmer	Port Adelaide	North Ballarat Rebels	TAC Cup	
5	79	Passed	Sydney	—	—	
6	80	Passed	Greater Western Sydney	—	—	
6	81	Josh McGuinness	Brisbane Lions	Lauderdale	TSL	
6	82	Passed	Carlton	—	—	
6	83	Passed	Richmond	—	—	
6	84	Billy Frampton	Port Adelaide	South Fremantle	WAFL	
7	85	Jeremy Finlayson	Greater Western Sydney	Sydney Hills Eagles	NEAFL	Academy player
7	86	Josh Clayton	Brisbane Lions	Sandringham Dragons	TAC Cup	Father–son rule selection – son of Scott Clayton
7	87	Passed	Carlton	—	—	

Notes

- Compensation picks are selections in addition to the normal order of selection, allocated to clubs by the AFL as compensation for losing uncontracted players to the new expansion clubs, Gold Coast and Greater Western Sydney. The picks can be held for up to five years and clubs declare at the beginning of the season of their intent to utilise the pick at the end of the season. Picks could be traded to other clubs in return for players or other draft selections.
- Free agency compensation picks are additional selections awarded to teams based on their net loss of players during the free agency trade period.
- Academy players are local zone selections available to the four NSW and Queensland clubs. Both academy and father–son selections are subject to a bidding process, where the club with the family or academy connection must match any opposition club's bid with their next available selection.

=== Rookie elevations ===
Between 2009 and 2013, rookie listed players that were elevated to their club's senior list were listed in the national draft order at the end of the club's selections. In 2014 the AFL reverted to the system used in 2008 and earlier, where they are not included in the draft list. Club can retain a rookie for up to three years before they must be elevated to the senior list or delisted. The 22 players elevated in 2014 are provided below.

Player	Club
Charlie Cameron	Adelaide
Patrick Ambrose	Essendon
Mark Blicavs	Geelong
Andrew Boston	Gold Coast
Josh Hall	Gold Coast
Zac Webster	Hawthorn
Dallas Willsmore	Hawthorn
Neville Jetta	Melbourne
Joel Tippett	North Melbourne
Kayne Turner	North Melbourne
Kane Mitchell	Port Adelaide
Anthony Miles	Richmond
Darren Minchington	St Kilda
Eli Templeton	St Kilda
Cameron Shenton	St Kilda
Mav Weller	St Kilda
Jake Lloyd	Sydney
Xavier Richards	Sydney
Daniel Robinson	Sydney
Callum Sinclair	West Coast
Lin Jong	Western Bulldogs
Jack Redpath	Western Bulldogs

== 2015 pre-season draft ==
The 2015 AFL pre-season draft was held on 3 December 2014. Only five clubs could have taken part, with the other clubs completing their lists during the National Draft, however Carlton made the only selection, with all other clubs passing.

Round	Pick	Player	Drafted to	Recruited from	League
1	1	Passed	Greater Western Sydney	—	—
1	2	Jason Tutt	Carlton	Western Bulldogs	AFL
1	3	Passed	Collingwood	—	—
1	4	Passed	Richmond	—	—
1	5	Passed	Sydney	—	—
2	6	Passed	Greater Western Sydney	—	—
2	7	Passed	Carlton	—	—
2	8	Passed	Sydney	—	—
3	9	Passed	Carlton	—	—

== 2015 rookie draft ==
The 2015 AFL rookie draft was held on 3 December 2014. The official rookie draft order was released on 2 December and each club, with the exception of Greater Western Sydney who are still operating with an expanded list, can have between 4 and 6 players on their rookie list, as long as they have a maximum of 44 players on their combined primary and rookie lists.

Round	Pick	Player	Drafted to	Recruited from	League	Notes
1	1	Jack Sinclair	St Kilda	Oakleigh Chargers	TAC Cup	
1	2	Aaron vandenBerg	Melbourne	Ainslie	NEAFL	
1	3	Passed	Greater Western Sydney	—	—	
1	4	Billy Evans	Brisbane Lions	Bendigo Pioneers	TAC Cup	
1	5	Roarke Smith	Western Bulldogs	Calder Cannons	TAC Cup	
1	6	Billy Gowers	Carlton	Oakleigh Chargers	TAC Cup	
1	7	Josh Glenn	Gold Coast	Central District	SANFL	
1	8	Michael Manteit	Collingwood	Sandringham Dragons	TAC Cup	
1	9	Reilly O'Brien	Adelaide	Calder Cannons	TAC Cup	
1	10	Kane Lucas	West Coast	Carlton	AFL	
1	11	Jayden Short	Richmond	Northern Knights	TAC Cup	
1	12	Shaun McKernan	Essendon	Adelaide	AFL	
1	13	Ethan Hughes	Fremantle	Swan Districts	WAFL	
1	14	Tom Read	Geelong	Sturt	SANFL	
1	15	Braydon Preuss	North Melbourne	Hermit Park/Surfers Paradise	QAFL	
1	16	Nathan Krakouer	Port Adelaide	Port Adelaide	SANFL	
1	17	Sean McLaren	Sydney	Sandringham Dragons	TAC Cup	
1	18	Jared Hardisty	Hawthorn	Claremont	WAFL	
2	19	Ahmed Saad	St Kilda	St Kilda	AFL	
2	20	Mitch White	Melbourne	Dandenong Stingrays	TAC Cup	
2	21	Passed	Greater Western Sydney	—	—	
2	22	Hugh Beasley	Brisbane Lions	Oakleigh Chargers	TAC Cup	
2	23	Jordan Kelly	Western Bulldogs	Hawthorn	AFL	
2	24	Brad Walsh	Carlton	Peel Thunder	WAFL	
2	25	Adam Saad	Gold Coast	Coburg	VFL	
2	26	Brenden Abbott	Collingwood	Claremont	WAFL	
2	27	Keenan Ramsey	Adelaide	Port Adelaide	SANFL	
2	28	Corey Adamson	West Coast	San Diego	Class A Minor Leagues	3-year non-registered player, via Class A minor league baseball
2	29	Jason Castagna	Richmond	Northern Knights	TAC Cup	
2	30	Kurt Aylett	Essendon	Essendon	AFL	
2	31	Tanner Smith	Fremantle	Fremantle	AFL	
2	32	Cameron Delaney	Geelong	North Melbourne	AFL	
2	33	Will Fordham	North Melbourne	Sandringham Dragons	TAC Cup	
2	34	Tom Logan	Port Adelaide	Port Adelaide	AFL	
2	35	Nic Newman	Sydney	Frankston	VFL	
2	36	Jermaine Miller-Lewis	Hawthorn	South Fremantle	WAFL	
3	37	Brenton Payne	St Kilda	Western Jets	TAC Cup	
3	38	Passed	Greater Western Sydney	—	—	
3	39	Passed	Brisbane Lions	—	—	
3	40	Daniel Pearce	Western Bulldogs	Western Bulldogs	AFL	
3	41	Tom Fields	Carlton	South Adelaide	SANFL	
3	42	Keegan Brooksby	Gold Coast	South Adelaide	SANFL	
3	43	Tony Armstrong	Collingwood	Collingwood	AFL	
3	44	Anthony Wilson	Adelaide	Norwood	SANFL	
3	45	Patrick Brophy	West Coast	Kildare GAA	GAA	International Player (Gaelic football)
3	46	Kane Lambert	Richmond	Williamstown	VFL	
3	47	Jake Long	Essendon	St Mary's Football Club	NTFL	Father–son rule selection – son of Michael Long
3	48	Sean Hurley	Fremantle	Kildare GAA	GAA	International Player (Gaelic football)
3	49	Padraig Lucey	Geelong	Kerry GAA	GAA	International Player (Gaelic football)
3	50	Max Warren	North Melbourne	North Ballarat	VFL	
3	51	Johann Wagner	Port Adelaide	Tasman FC/Central District	Port Lincoln FL/SANFL	Winner of The Recruit.
3	52	Lewis Melican	Sydney	Geelong Falcons	TAC Cup	
3	53	Lachlan Langford	Hawthorn	Melbourne Grammar School	APS	
4	54	Adam Schneider	St Kilda	St Kilda	AFL	
4	55	Passed	Greater Western Sydney	—	—	
4	56	Cian Hanley	Brisbane Lions	Mayo GAA	GAA	International Player (Gaelic football)
4	57	Brett Goodes	Western Bulldogs	Western Bulldogs	AFL	
4	58	Fraser Russell	Carlton	Deakin Athletics Club	Athletics Victoria	3-year non-registered player, via athletics
4	59	Tyrone Downie	Gold Coast	Bendigo Gold	VFL	
4	60	Mason Cox	Collingwood	Oklahoma State	Big 12	International Player (basketball)
4	61	Matthew Arnot	Richmond	Richmond	AFL	
4	62	Conor McKenna	Essendon	Tyrone GAA	GAA	International Player (Gaelic football)
4	63	Robin Nahas	North Melbourne	North Melbourne	AFL	
4	64	Passed	Sydney	—	—	
4	65	Sam Grimley	Hawthorn	Hawthorn	AFL	
5	66	Passed	Greater Western Sydney	—	—	
5	67	Greg Broughton	Gold Coast	Gold Coast	AFL	
5	68	Ivan Soldo	Richmond	—	—	3-year non-registered player, via basketball
5	69	Passed	Sydney	—	—	
6	70	Passed	Greater Western Sydney	—	—	
6	71	Andrew Raines	Gold Coast	Brisbane Lions	AFL	
6	72	Passed	Greater Western Sydney	—	—	
7	73	Passed	Gold Coast	—	—	
8	74	Passed	Greater Western Sydney	—	—	
9	75	Matthew Hammelmann	Brisbane Lions	Morningside	QAFL	Academy Selection
9	76	Jordan Foote	Sydney	UNSW-Easts	Sydney AFL	Academy Selection

== Selections by league ==
League	National Draft	Pre-season Draft	Rookie Draft	Total	State/territory
League	Players selected				State/territory
TAC Cup	45	—	14	59	Victoria
WAFL	9	—	5	14	Western Australia
SANFL	9	—	8	17	South Australia
VFL	—	—	5	5	Victoria
NEAFL	8	—	1	9	ACT, NSW, NT, QLD
TSL	2	—	—	2	Tasmania
AFL	—	1	17	18	Australia-wide
Other leagues	3	—	5	8	Victoria, NSW, SA & NT
3-year non-registered players	—	—	3	3	Australia-wide
International recruits	—	—	6	6	International
Total	76	1	64	141	
