= Max Warren =

Australian rules footballer

Personal information
- Full name: Max Warren
- Born: 29 January 1993 (age 33)
- Original teams: Eastern Ranges, (TAC Cup)
- Draft: No. 10, 2012 Rookie Draft, North Melbourne
- Height: 181 cm (5 ft 11 in)
- Weight: 80 kg (176 lb)
- Position: Midfielder/Defender

Playing career^{1}
Years	Club	Games (Goals)
2012–2015	North Melbourne	1 (0)
- ^{1} Playing statistics correct to the end of 2014.

Max Warren (born 29 January 1993) is a former professional Australian rules footballer who played for the North Melbourne Football Club in the Australian Football League (AFL).

Warren was drafted with the 10th selection in the 2012 rookie draft from Eastern Ranges in the TAC Cup. Warren made his debut in Round 15, 2014 against Brisbane Lions.

Warren was delisted at the conclusion of the 2014 AFL season after a disappointing three years with the North Melbourne Football Club, during which Warren only played one game for the club. He was redrafted in the 2015 rookie draft However, after failing to play a match in 2015, he was delisted again at the conclusion of the 2015 season.

Warren is now a Melbourne based real estate agent.
