= Hugh Goddard =

Australian rules footballer (born 1996)

Personal information
- Full name: Hugh Goddard
- Born: 24 August 1996 (age 30)
- Original team: Geelong Falcons (TAC Cup)/Melbourne Grammar School (APS)
- Draft: No. 21, 2014 national draft)
- Height: 198 cm (6 ft 6 in)
- Weight: 94
- Position: Defender / Forward

Playing career^{1}
Years	Club	Games (Goals)
2015-2018	St Kilda	10 (1)
2019-2020	Carlton	2 (0)
Total		12 (1)
- ^{1} Playing statistics correct to the end of end of 2019 season.

Hugh Goddard (born 24 August 1996) is an Australian rules footballer who formerly played for the St Kilda and Carlton football clubs in the Australian Football League (AFL).

== AFL career ==
Goddard is a second cousin of former St Kilda player and former Essendon captain and player Brendon Goddard. He was drafted as pick 21 in the 2014 AFL draft. He grew up in Geelong and attended Melbourne Grammar School as a boarder. He made his debut in round 16 of the 2015 AFL season in St Kilda's loss against Richmond, playing alongside former Geelong Falcons teammate Paddy McCartin.

In just his ninth game (and first for the 2016 season), Goddard suffered an achilles tendon injury in the Saints' 88-point loss to Adelaide at the Adelaide Oval in Round 11, ending his season and ensuring that he would spend the next twelve months on the sidelines.

In the 2018 AFL Rookie Draft, Goddard was selected with the first pick by Carlton, after spending time training with the club. Goddard made his Carlton debut in Round 17 of the 2019 season against Sydney at the SCG and played a total of two games for Carlton. He played most of the season with Carlton's VFL-affiliate Northern Blues, winning the Laurie Hill Trophy as club best and fairest. He was delisted at the end of 2020.
