= Lukas Webb =

Australian rules footballer

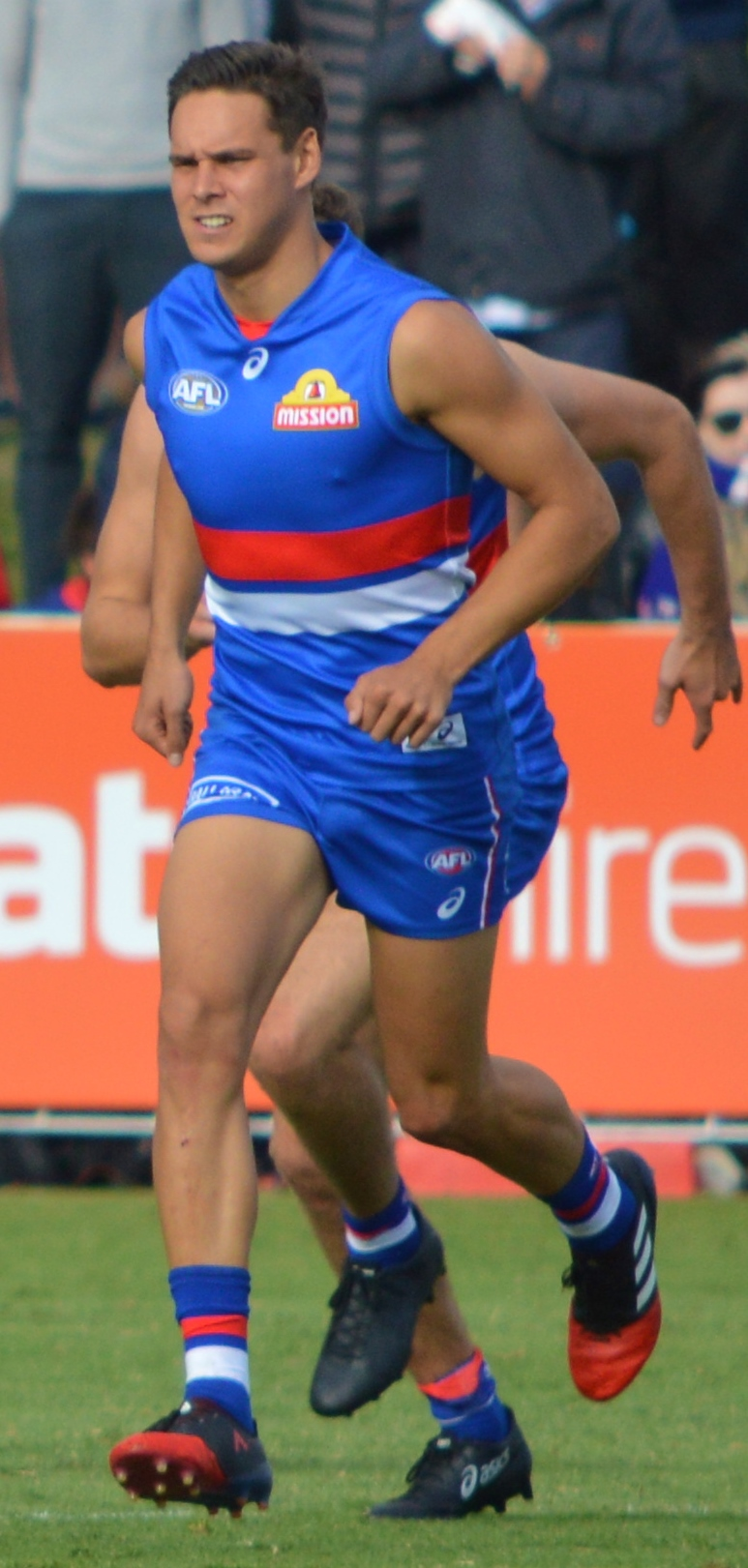
- Webb with the Western Bulldogs in February 2017

Personal information
- Born: 4 March 1996 (age 30)
- Original team: Gippsland Power
- Draft: No. 27, 2014 National Draft,Western Bulldogs
- Height: 186 cm (6 ft 1 in)
- Weight: 80 kg (176 lb)
- Position: Utility

Playing career^{1}
Years	Club	Games (Goals)
2015–2019	Western Bulldogs	24 (7)
- ^{1} Playing statistics correct to the end of 2018.

Career highlights
- VFL premiership player: 2016

Lukas Webb (born 4 March 1996) is a professional Australian rules footballer who played for the Western Bulldogs in the Australian Football League (AFL).

Webb was drafted with pick 27 of the 2014 National Draft. He made his debut against Hawthorn in round 3 of the 2015 season.

Webb was delisted at the end of the 2019 season.
