= Billy Evans (Australian footballer) =

Australian rules footballer

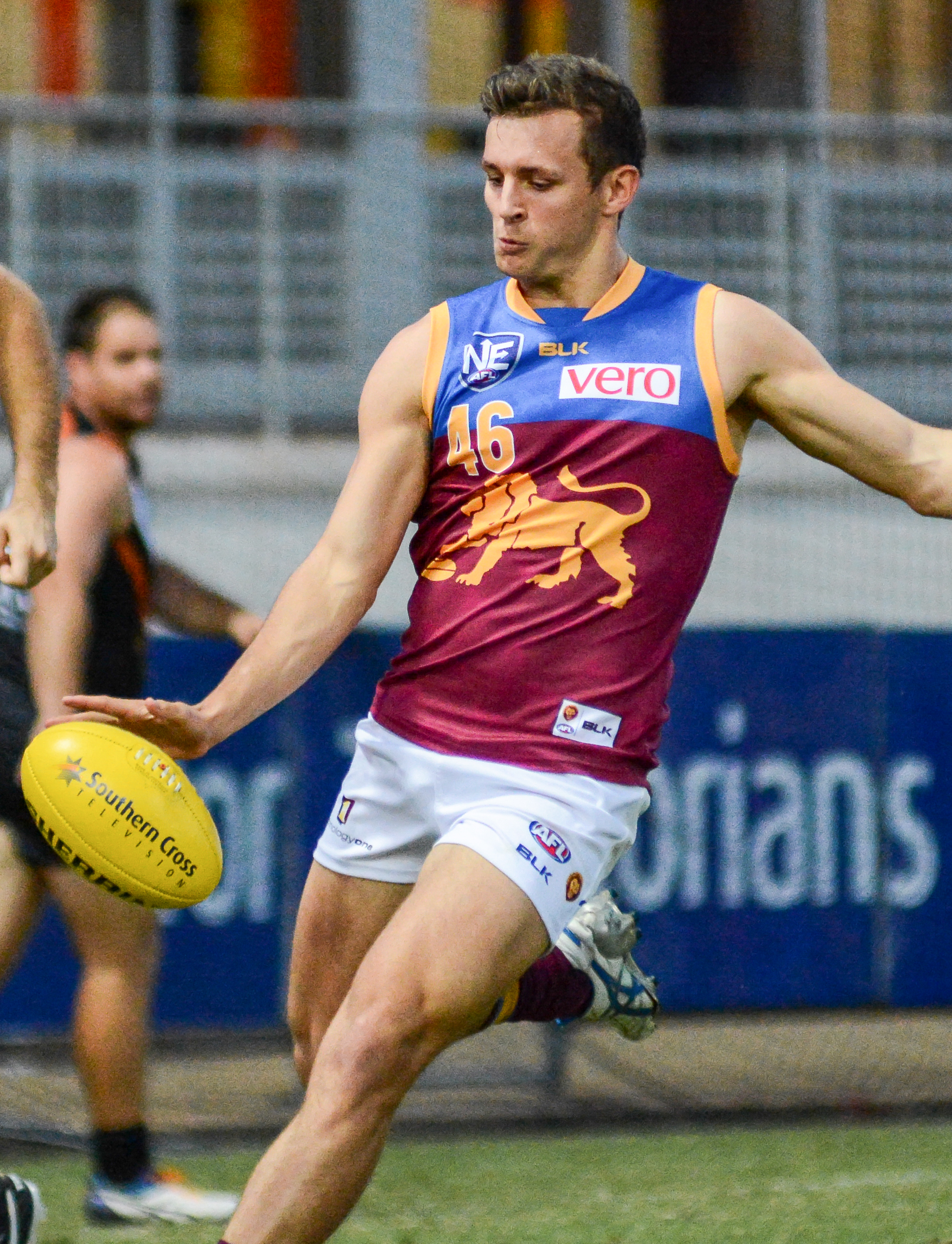
- Evans playing for Brisbane reserves in June 2016

Personal information
- Full name: Billy Evans
- Born: 19 October 1996 (age 30)
- Original team: Bendigo Pioneers
- Draft: No. 4, 2015 AFL rookie draft
- Debut: Round 19, 2015, Brisbane Lions vs. Gold Coast, at the Gabba
- Height: 187 cm (6 ft 2 in)
- Weight: 87 kg (192 lb)
- Position: Midfielder

Playing career^{1}
Years	Club	Games (Goals)
2015–2016	Brisbane Lions	7 (1)
- ^{1} Playing statistics correct to the end of 2016.

Billy Evans (born 19 October 1996) is a former professional Australian rules footballer who played for the Brisbane Lions in the Australian Football League (AFL).

Evans played for the Bendigo Pioneers in the TAC Cup and represented Victoria Country at the 2014 AFL Under 18 Championships. He attended Catholic College Bendigo.

Evans was drafted by the Brisbane Lions with their first selection and the fourth overall in the 2015 AFL rookie draft. He made his debut in the fourteen point loss against Gold Coast in round 19, 2015 at the Gabba. After seven matches with Brisbane, he was delisted at the conclusion of the 2016 season.

== Statistics ==
Legend
G	Goals	K	Kicks	D	Disposals	T	Tackles
B	Behinds	H	Handballs	M	Marks

Season	Team	No.	Games	Totals							Averages (per game)						
Season	Team	No.	Games	G	B	K	H	D	M	T	G	B	K	H	D	M	T
2015	Brisbane Lions	46	5	1	2	17	40	57	9	14	0.2	0.4	3.4	8.0	11.4	1.8	2.8
2016	Brisbane Lions	46	2	0	0	6	14	20	4	8	0.0	0.0	3.0	7.0	10.0	2.0	4.0
Career			7	1	2	23	54	77	13	22	0.1	0.3	3.3	7.7	11.0	1.9	3.1
