= Wayne Lamb (footballer) =

Australian rules footballer

Personal information
- Full name: Wayne Lamb
- Born: 19 October 1972 (age 54)
- Original team: Parkmore
- Height: 173 cm (5 ft 8 in)
- Weight: 71 kg (157 lb)

Playing career^{1}
Years	Club	Games (Goals)
1992–1994	Melbourne	2 (0)
1995–1996	Fitzroy	19 (13)
Total		21 (13)
- ^{1} Playing statistics correct to the end of 1996.

For the American Broadway dancer, choreographer, theater director, and professor of dance, see Wayne Lamb.

Wayne Lamb (born 19 October 1972) is a former Australian rules footballer who played with Melbourne and Fitzroy in the Australian Football League (AFL).

Lamb debuted for Melbourne in 1992, his first game was a draw against Sydney. In either 1993 or 1994, Lamb played minimal games due to 2 knee operations. He made most of his AFL appearances in the 1995 season for Fitzroy, playing 16 games and receiving 2 Brownlow votes against Stkilda.

Lamb dislocated his elbow in early 1996 and did not play in the AFL again.

His son, Tom Lamb, was drafted to the West Coast Eagles.

He moved to Tasmania in 1997, where he played with New Norfolk and was later playing coach with the Cygnet Football Club from 1998 to 2000.

Lamb has three other children; Max, Madison and Matilda.
