= Hugh Beasley =

Australian rules footballer

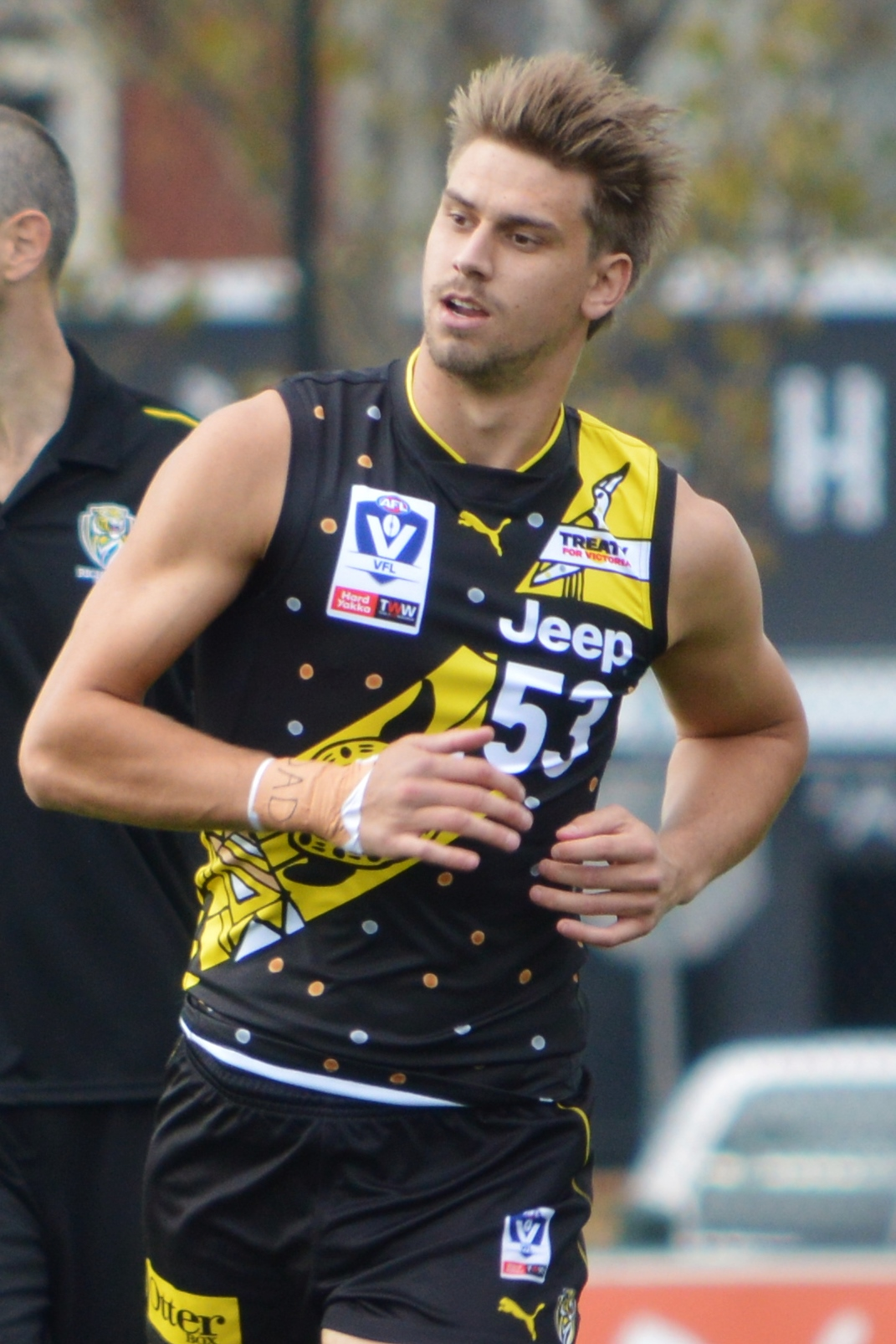
- Hugh Beasley in 2019.

Personal information
- Full name: Hugh Beasley
- Born: 12 November 1995 (age 30)
- Original team: Oakleigh Chargers
- Draft: No. 22, 2015 AFL Rookie draft, Brisbane Lions
- Height: 191 cm (6 ft 3 in)
- Weight: 86 kg (190 lb)
- Position: Defender

Playing career^{1}
Years	Club	Games (Goals)
2015–2016	Brisbane Lions	6 (0)
- ^{1} Playing statistics correct to the end of 2016.

Career highlights
- VFL: VFL premiership player: 2019

Hugh Beasley is a former professional Australian rules footballer who played for the Brisbane Lions in the Australian Football League (AFL). He played his first game in round 10 of the 2015 season. He was delisted by Brisbane at the conclusion of the 2016 season. In 2019 he won a VFL premiership with Richmond.

== Statistics ==
Legend
G	Goals	K	Kicks	D	Disposals	T	Tackles
B	Behinds	H	Handballs	M	Marks

Season	Team	No.	Games	Totals							Averages (per game)						
Season	Team	No.	Games	G	B	K	H	D	M	T	G	B	K	H	D	M	T
2015	Brisbane Lions	48	6	0	2	28	31	59	16	16	0.0	0.3	4.7	5.2	9.8	2.7	2.7
2016	Brisbane Lions	48	0	—	—	—	—	—	—	—	—	—	—	—	—	—	—
Career			6	0	2	28	31	59	16	16	0.0	0.3	4.7	5.2	9.8	2.7	2.7
