= Josh Glenn =

Australian rules footballer (born 1994)

Personal information
- Full name: Joshua William Glenn
- Born: 10 March 1994 (age 32)
- Original team: Central District
- Draft: No. 7, 2015 rookie draft,Gold Coast
- Height: 183 cm (6 ft 0 in)
- Weight: 90 kg (198 lb)

Playing career^{1}
Years	Club	Games (Goals)
2015	Gold Coast	5 (1)
- ^{1} Playing statistics correct to the end of 2015.

Joshua William Glenn (born 10 March 1994) is a former professional Australian rules footballer who played for the Gold Coast Football Club in the Australian Football League (AFL).

Glenn played junior football mostly for Central District with a stint at Elizabeth in 2012, before returning to Central District in 2013, this time in their senior South Australian National Football League (SANFL) team, where he won the competition's rising star award. Glenn was drafted with pick 7 in the 2015 rookie draft, after having declined an invitation to the previous year's draft combine because he said he was not mature enough. He was elevated to the main list and made his debut against the Brisbane Lions in round 5, 2015, in which he scored his only AFL goal on his first kick. He was delisted in October 2015, after informing the Gold Coast Football Club that he no longer wished to play on in 2016, citing homesickness exacerbated by an ankle injury that sidelined him for a month.

In 2016 he returned to South Australia and played for a team with ties to his family, the Willaston Football Club in the Barossa Light & Gawler Football Association, where he scored thirty goals in thirteen games. In 2017 he returned to the SANFL, playing once again for Central District. He was set to return to Willaston in 2018 but was dismissed from the club after an incident in March of that year, when he was involved in a drunken assault along with a fellow Willaston football player. They both pleaded guilty to a charge of recklessly causing harm and received a three-month suspended sentence and a twelve-month good behaviour bond. Later in 2018 he was recruited to play with Norwood. Also in 2018, the Willaston football club was fined, stripped of match points, and two of its officials received penalties after salary cap breaches relating to Glenn in both 2016 and 2018. The club had given him sign-on payments in contravention of its league's rules.

In 2019 Glenn was banned for four years after the presence of two anabolic steroids was found in a sample taken after an SANFL game in 2018. After serving his ban, He returned to football for Golden Grove in the Adelaide Footy League, debuting for the club in the final game of the regular 2022 season. In August 2025, he was suspended for six games (comprising the rest of that year's season) for a dangerous dump tackle in a game against Glenunga. In October 2025, he was signed once again to Elizabeth for the 2026 division 6 season.
