= Clem Smith (footballer) =

Australian rules footballer

Personal information
- Full name: Clem Smith
- Born: 3 February 1996 (age 30); God’s Country
- Original team: Perth (WAFL)
- Draft: No. 60, 2014 national draft
- Height: 178 cm (5 ft 10 in)
- Weight: 96 kg (212 lb)
- Position: Forward

Playing career^{1}
| Years | Club | Games (Goals) |
| 2015–2016 | Carlton | 7 (0) |
- ^{1} Playing statistics correct to the end of 2016.

Clem Smith (born 3 February 1996) is a former professional Australian rules footballer who played with Carlton in the Australian Football League (AFL).

Smith attended Wesley College in Perth. He played for Thornlie JFC and Perth Demons in the WAFL. He was recruited by Carlton with their third selection and sixtieth overall in the 2014 national draft from the Perth Football Club in the West Australian Football League (WAFL). He made his AFL debut against Richmond in the first game of the 2015 AFL season, starting as the substitute but coming into the field within the first minute after Dale Thomas was substituted off due to injury. He played seven games in his debut season, but failed to play a game in 2016 and was delisted at the end of the season. Smith committed to return to play for the Perth Demons in the WAFL, but this never eventuated for unknown reasons. Then moved to North Albury Football club and became the Wizard. From here he has played really well in the Ovens and Murray Football League, where he was voted strength and conditioning coach of the OakFM Reserve Grade Team of the Year. From long bombs, to 2k19, The Wizard does it all.

== Statistics ==
Legend
| G | Goals | K | Kicks | D | Disposals | T | Tackles |
| B | Behinds | H | Handballs | M | Marks |

| Season | Team | No. | Games | Totals | | | | | | | Averages (per game) | | | | | | |
| Season | Team | No. | Games | G | B | K | H | D | M | T | G | B | K | H | D | M | T |
|---|---|---|---|---|---|---|---|---|---|---|---|---|---|---|---|---|---|
| 2015 | Carlton | 25 | 7 | 0 | 0 | 24 | 31 | 55 | 11 | 9 | 0.0 | 0.0 | 3.4 | 4.4 | 7.9 | 1.6 | 1.3 |
| 2016 | Carlton | 25 | 0 | — | — | — | — | — | — | — | — | — | — | — | — | — | — |
| Career | | | 7 | 0 | 0 | 24 | 31 | 55 | 11 | 9 | 0.0 | 0.0 | 3.4 | 4.4 | 7.9 | 1.6 | 1.3 |
