= Lachie Weller =

Australian rules footballer (born 1996)

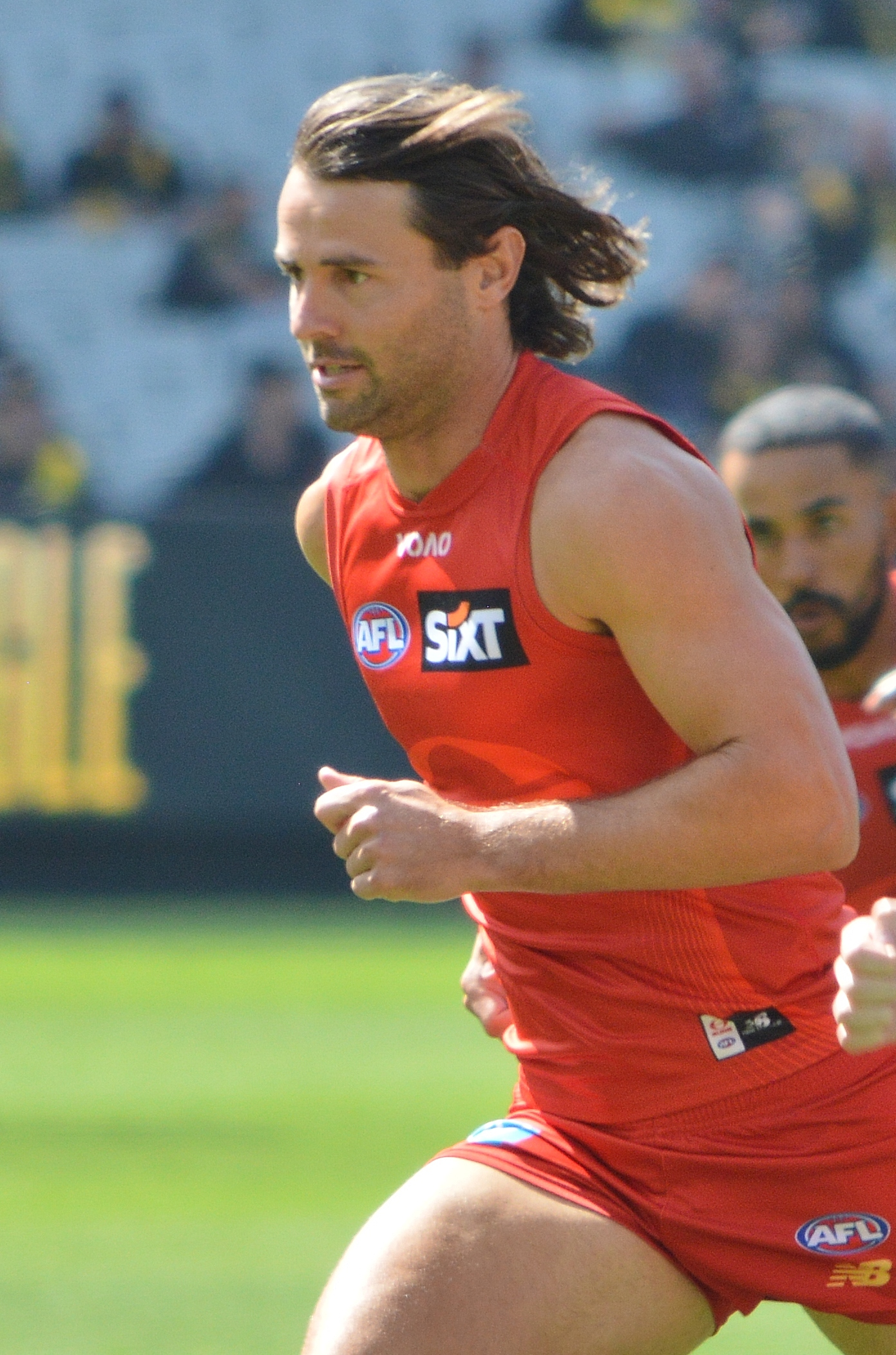
- Weller playing for Gold Coast in March 2026

Personal information
- Full name: Lachie Weller
- Born: 23 February 1996 (age 30)
- Original team: Southport (NEAFL)/Broadbeach Cats/Burnie Dockers
- Draft: No. 13, 2014 national draft
- Height: 182 cm (6 ft 0 in)
- Weight: 83 kg (183 lb)
- Position: Midfielder

Club information
- Current club: Gold Coast
- Number: 14

Playing career^{1}
Years	Club	Games (Goals)
2015–2017	Fremantle	47 (17)
2018–	Gold Coast	125 (38)
Total		172 (55)

Representative team honours
Years	Team	Games (Goals)
2020	All Stars	1 (1)
- ^{1} Playing statistics correct to the end of round 22, 2026.

Career highlights
- AFL Rising Star nominee: 2016; Beacon Award winner: 2016

Lachlan Weller (born 23 February 1996) is a professional Australian rules footballer playing for the Gold Coast Football Club in the Australian Football League (AFL). He previously played for the Fremantle Football Club from 2015 to 2017.

== Early life ==
Originally from Burnie in Tasmania, Weller moved to Gold Coast in Queensland at age 15 (2011) with his family, when his brother Maverick was playing for the Gold Coast Football Club. Lachie then joined the Gold Coast Suns Academy, but did not qualify as a priority selection due to not fulfilling the length of residence requirements.

During this time, he completed his schooling commitments at All Saints Anglican School on the Gold Coast and played junior football for Broadbeach as well as Southport. He was drafted by Fremantle with their first selection, number 13 overall, in the 2014 AFL draft.

== AFL career ==
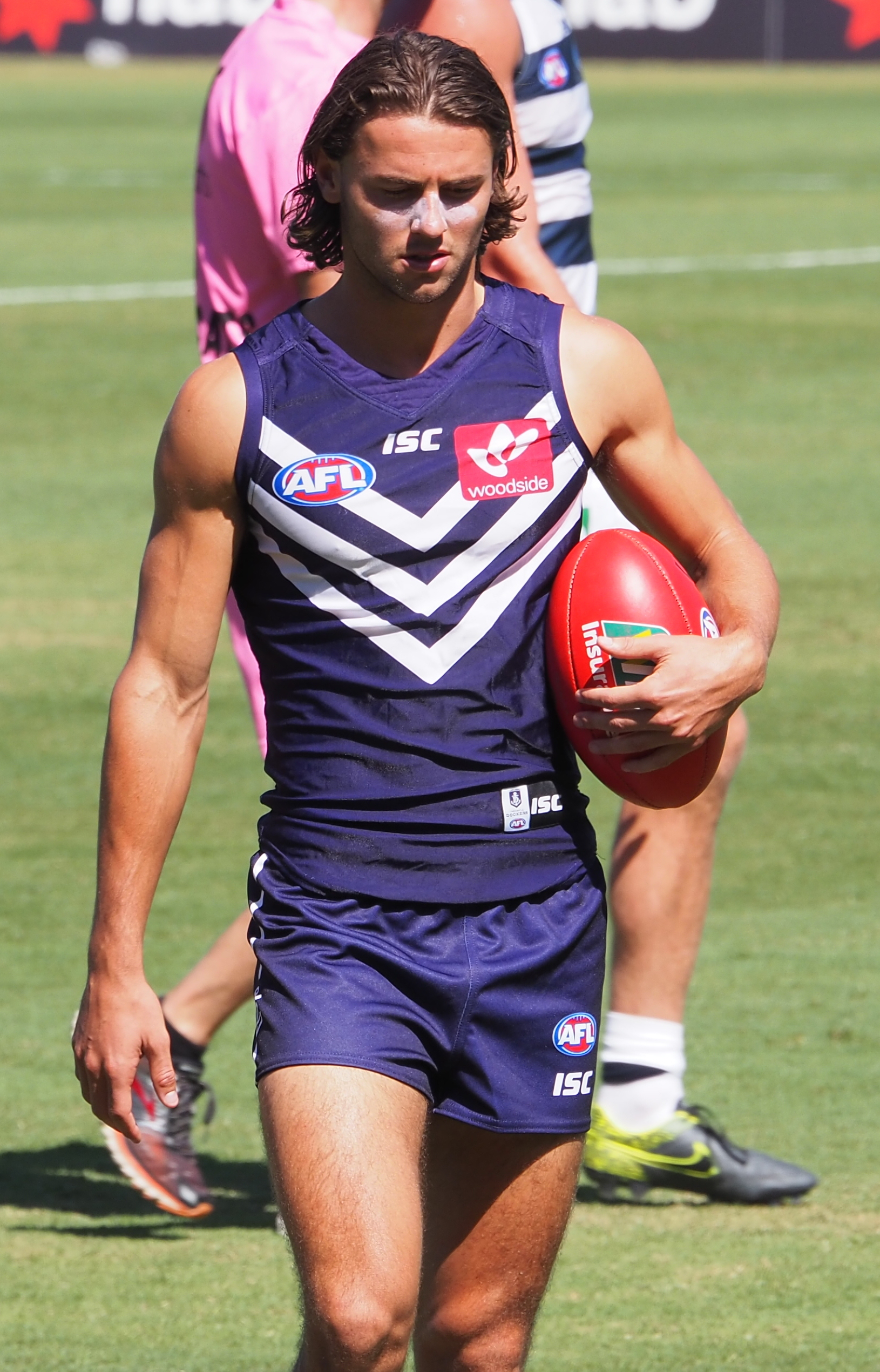
Weller playing for Fremantle in March 2016

After playing well for Peel Thunder Football Club in the West Australian Football League, Weller made his debut in round 18 of the 2015 AFL season against Greater Western Sydney. At the conclusion of the 2017 AFL season, after playing 47 games for Fremantle, Weller requested a trade to Gold Coast, subsequently being traded, along with pick 41 in the 2017 AFL draft for pick 2.

Weller represented the All-Stars in the State of Origin for Bushfire Relief Match early in 2020. He kicked a goal in the loss to Victoria.

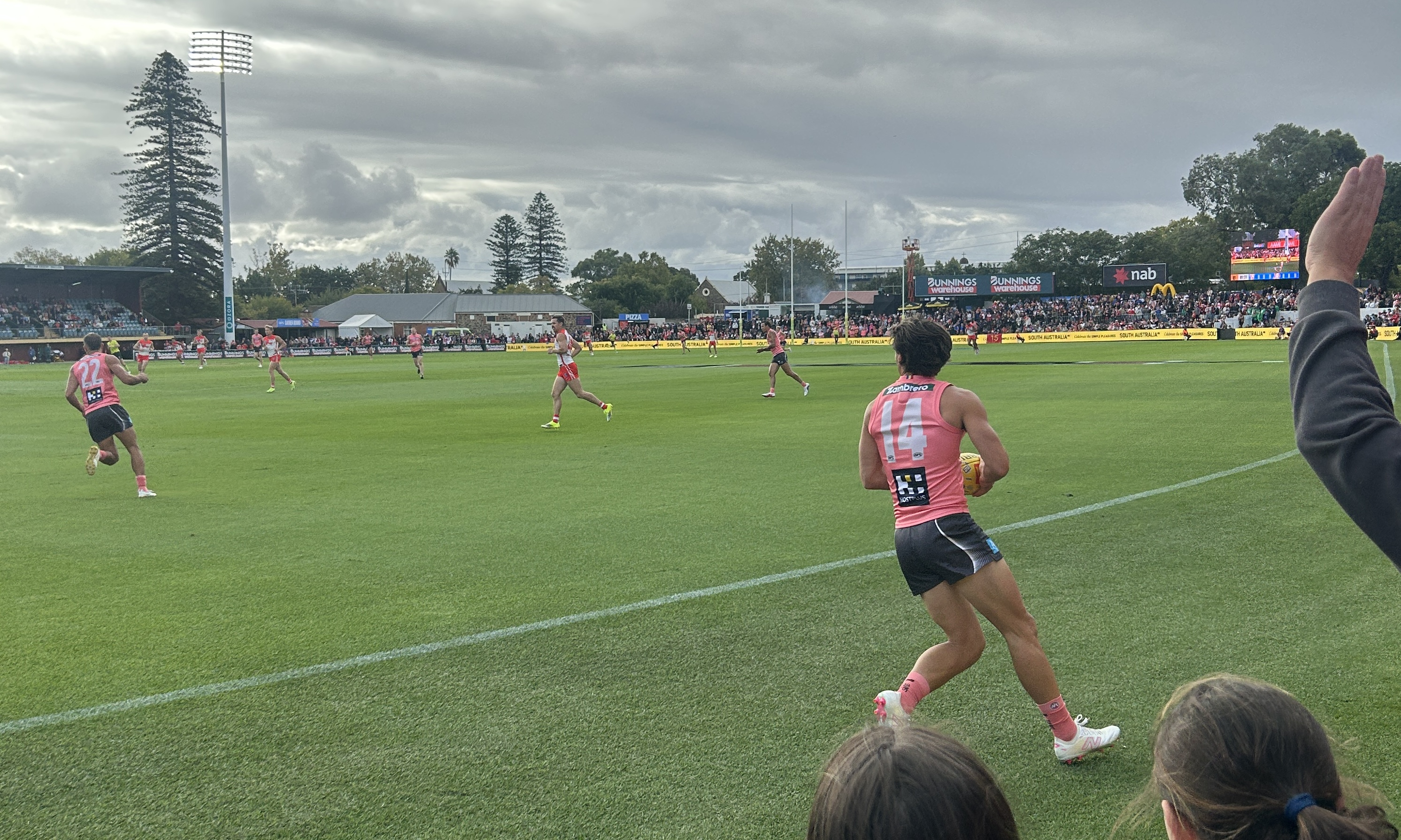
Weller playing for Gold Coast in April 2026

In 2022, Weller underwent a knee reconstruction. He underwent a second knee reconstruction a year later, for a second tear of his anterior cruciate ligament. Upon his return to AFL football, Weller revitalised his career, becoming an important utility for the Suns. Following more than 150 senior appearances, he played in his first finals match in 2025, securing a thrilling elimination final win against his former team Fremantle.

== Personal life ==
Weller's cousin, Casey Barnes, is a country rock singer who is also based on the Gold Coast.

Weller and his wife Nicola have two children.

== Statistics ==
Updated to the end of round 22, 2026.

Legend
G	Goals	K	Kicks	D	Disposals	T	Tackles
B	Behinds	H	Handballs	M	Marks

Season	Team	No.	Games	Totals							Averages (per game)							Votes
Season	Team	No.	Games	G	B	K	H	D	M	T	G	B	K	H	D	M	T	Votes
2015	Fremantle	14	3	0	0	14	17	31	7	7	0.0	0.0	4.7	5.7	10.3	2.3	2.3	0
2016	Fremantle	14	22	12	10	171	169	340	55	72	0.5	0.5	7.8	7.7	15.5	2.5	3.3	2
2017	Fremantle	14	22	5	4	258	184	442	89	53	0.2	0.2	11.7	8.4	20.1	4.0	2.4	0
2018	Gold Coast	14	22	4	8	258	175	433	93	57	0.2	0.4	11.7	8.0	19.7	4.2	2.6	3
2019	Gold Coast	14	17	2	5	227	148	375	81	47	0.1	0.3	13.4	8.7	22.1	4.8	2.8	0
2020 (Note: The 2020 season was played with 17 home-and-away matches per team (down from 22) and 16-minute quarters with time on (down from 20-minute quarters with time on) due to the impact of the COVID-19 pandemic.)	Gold Coast	14	17	12	3	161	125	286	39	48	0.7	0.2	9.5	7.4	16.8	2.3	2.8	1
2021	Gold Coast	14	13	7	3	137	104	241	71	44	0.5	0.2	10.5	8.0	18.5	5.5	3.4	0
2022	Gold Coast	14	11	3	2	161	64	225	48	17	0.3	0.2	14.6	5.8	20.5	4.4	1.5	4
2023	Gold Coast	14	9	0	2	138	56	194	61	15	0.0	0.2	15.3	6.2	21.6	6.8	1.7	2
2024	Gold Coast	14	6	2	3	62	38	100	18	18	0.3	0.5	10.3	6.3	16.7	3.0	3.0	0
2025	Gold Coast	14	19	3	7	146	146	292	46	38	0.2	0.4	7.7	7.7	15.4	2.4	2.0	0
2026	Gold Coast	14	11	5	1	85	74	159	32	22	0.5	0.1	7.7	6.7	14.5	2.9	2.0	0
Career			172	55	48	1818	1300	3118	640	438	0.3	0.3	10.6	7.6	18.1	3.7	2.5	12
