= Jarrod Garlett =

Australian rules footballer (born 1996)

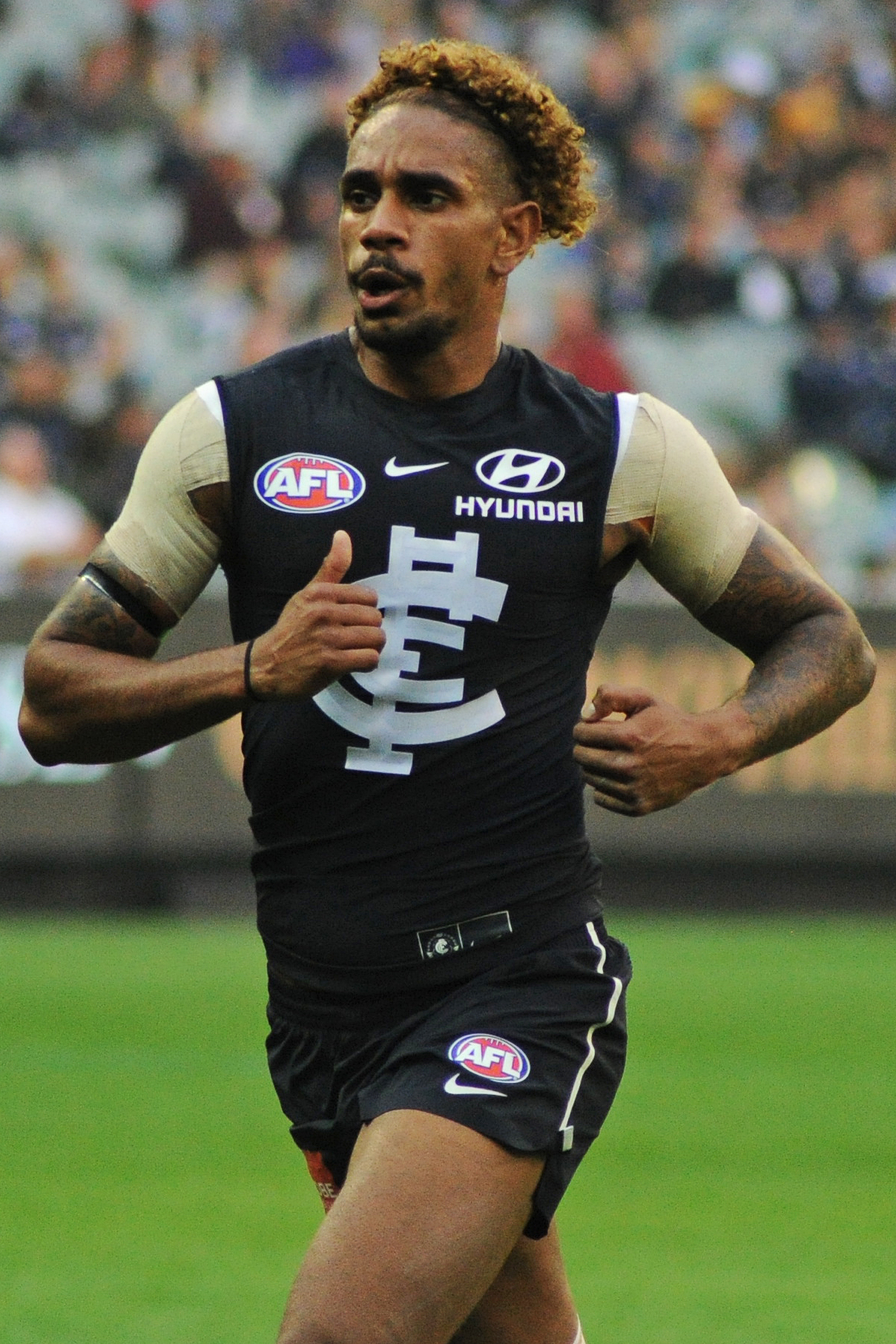
- Garlett playing for Carlton in April 2018

Personal information
- Full name: Jarrod Garlett
- Born: 3 May 1996 (age 30)
- Original team: South Fremantle (WAFL)
- Draft: No. 15, 2014 national draft No. 78, 2017 national draft
- Height: 181 cm (5 ft 11 in)
- Weight: 75 kg (165 lb)
- Position: Small Forward \ Small Defender

Playing career^{1}
Years	Club	Games (Goals)
2015–2016	Gold Coast	17 (10)
2018–2019	Carlton	13(5)
Total		30 (15)
- ^{1} Playing statistics correct to the end of end of 2019 season.

Jarrod Garlett (born 3 May 1996) is a former professional Australian rules footballer who played for the Gold Coast Football Club and Carlton Football Club in the Australian Football League (AFL).

Garlett played for the South Fremantle Football Club in the West Australian Football League (WAFL) before being drafted with pick 15 in the 2014 AFL draft. He made his AFL debut round 1 of the 2015 AFL season. In his third game he was nominated for the 2015 AFL Goal of the Year after running from the backline to kick a long goal. At the conclusion of the 2016 season, he left Gold Coast to return home to Western Australia due to family reasons.

Garlett is a second cousin of Melbourne's Jeff Garlett and a first cousin of Hawthorn's 2013 draftee Dayle Garlett.

He was drafted by Carlton with the last pick in the 2017 national draft, and played thirteen games with the Blues in two seasons before being delisted at the end of the 2019 season.
