= Daniel McKenzie (footballer) =

Australian rules footballer

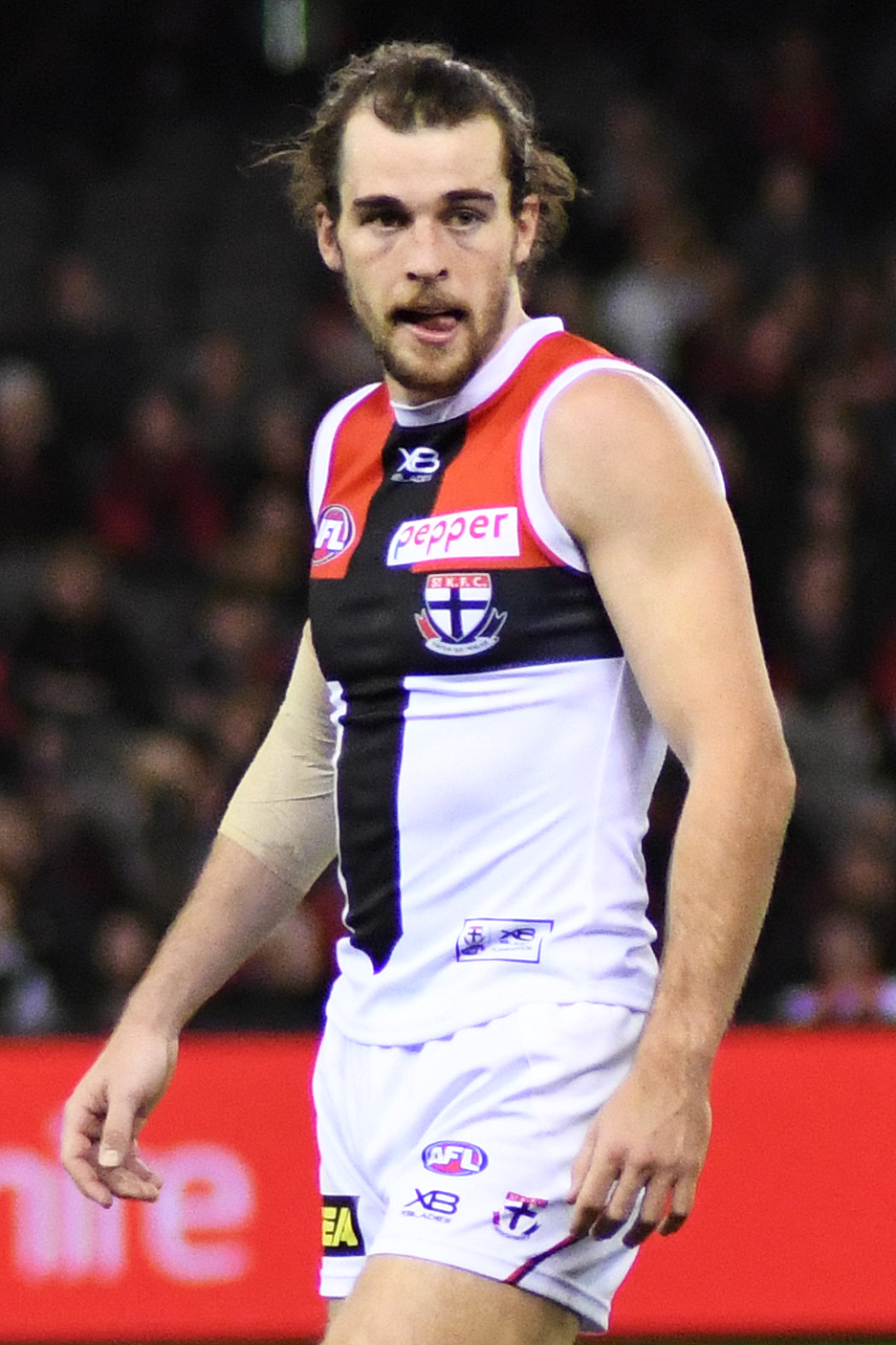
- McKenzie with St Kilda in August 2018

Personal information
- Born: 17 May 1996 (age 30)
- Original team: Oakleigh Chargers
- Draft: No. 22, 2014 National Draft,St Kilda
- Height: 184 cm (6 ft 0 in)
- Weight: 83 kg (183 lb)
- Positions: Wing, Midfield, Half-back flank

Club information
- Current club: Port Melbourne

Playing career^{1}
Years	Club	Games (Goals)
2015–2023	St Kilda	73 (11)
- ^{1} Playing statistics correct to the end of round 2, 2023.

Daniel McKenzie (born 17 May 1996) is a former professional Australian rules footballer who played for the St Kilda Football Club in the Australian Football League (AFL). He currently plays for Port Melbourne in the semi professional Victorian Football League.

McKenzie was drafted with pick 22 of the 2014 National Draft from the Oakleigh Chargers. He made his debut against Essendon in round 5 of the 2015 season. In mid 2019, McKenzie signed a contract extension that will keep him with St Kilda until the end of the 2022 season.

McKenzie was delisted by St Kilda after the 2023 season after persistent calf injuries, with the door remaining open for him to be re-drafted if he could fix these recurring injuries over the summer.

He played junior football for Blackburn in the Eastern Football Netball League and school football for Caulfield Grammar School.

== Statistics ==
Updated to the end of round 2, 2023.

Legend
G	Goals	K	Kicks	D	Disposals	T	Tackles
B	Behinds	H	Handballs	M	Marks

Season	Team	No.	Games	Totals							Averages (per game)						
Season	Team	No.	Games	G	B	K	H	D	M	T	G	B	K	H	D	M	T
2015	St Kilda	36	7	0	0	25	51	76	15	20	-	-	3.6	7.3	10.9	2.1	2.9
2016	St Kilda	36	9	0	2	50	64	114	33	29	-	0.2	5.6	7.1	12.7	3.7	3.2
2017	St Kilda	36	5	2	0	38	34	72	23	13	0.4	-	7.6	6.8	14.4	4.6	2.6
2018	St Kilda	36	13	1	0	79	97	176	54	36	0.1	-	6.1	7.5	13.5	4.2	2.8
2019	St Kilda	36	15	0	0	84	79	163	50	34	-	-	5.6	5.3	10.9	3.3	2.3
2020 (Note: The 2020 season was played with 17 home-and-away matches per team (down from 22) and 16-minute quarters with time on (down from 20-minute quarters with time on) due to the impact of the COVID-19 pandemic.)	St Kilda	36	0	-	-	-	-	-	-	-	-	-	-	-	-	-	-
2021	St Kilda	36	12	5	0	105	75	180	56	20	0.4	-	8.8	6.3	15.0	4.7	1.7
2022	St Kilda	36	12	3	3	121	77	198	57	25	0.3	0.3	10.1	6.4	16.5	4.8	2.1
2023	St Kilda	36	0	-	-	-	-	-	-	-	-	-	-	-	-	-	-
Career			73	11	5	502	477	979	288	177	0.2	0.1	6.9	6.5	13.4	4.0	2.4
