= Jaden McGrath =

Australian rules footballer

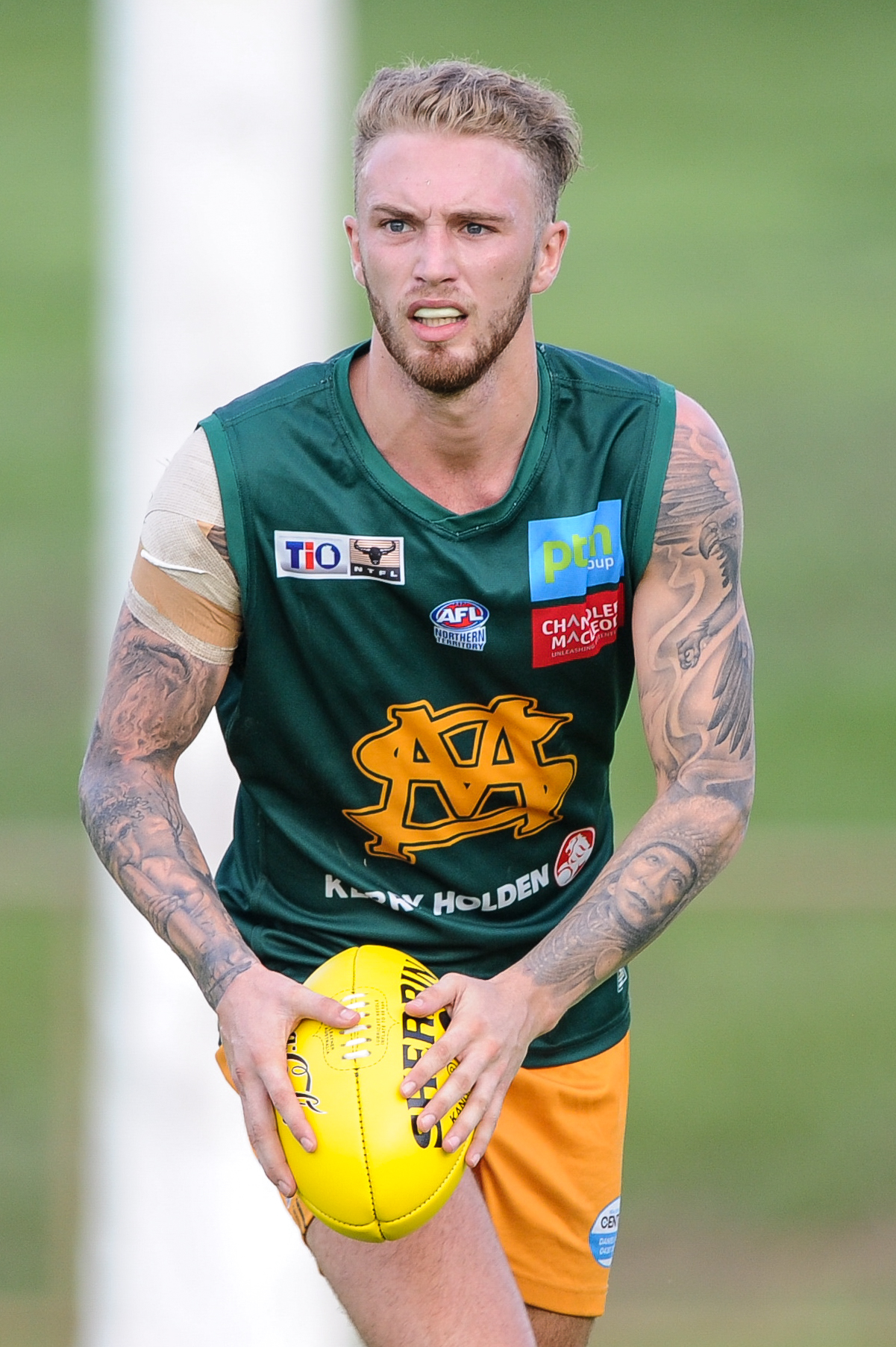
- McGrath playing for St Mary's in November 2017

Personal information
- Full name: Jaden McGrath
- Born: 15 June 1996 (age 30)
- Original team: Bendigo Pioneers
- Draft: No. 73, 2014 national draft
- Height: 180 cm (5 ft 11 in)
- Weight: 73 kg (161 lb)
- Position: Forward

Playing career^{1}
Years	Club	Games (Goals)
2015–2016	Brisbane Lions	3 (0)
- ^{1} Playing statistics correct to the end of 2016.

Jaden McGrath is a former professional Australian rules footballer who played for the Brisbane Lions in the Australian Football League (AFL). He made his AFL debut in round 1, 2015 against Collingwood at the Gabba. In November 2016, he retired from AFL football after losing passion to play at an elite level.
