= Tom Fields =

Australian rules footballer

Personal information
- Full name: Thomas Fields
- Born: 19 December 1992 (age 33)
- Original teams: Labrador (NEAFL); South Adelaide (SANFL)
- Height: 192 cm (6 ft 4 in)
- Weight: 93 kg (205 lb)
- Position: Defender

Playing career^{1}
Years	Club	Games (Goals)
2015	Carlton	2 (0)
- ^{1} Playing statistics correct to the end of 2015.

Tom Fields (born 19 December 1992) is a former professional Australian rules footballer who played for the Carlton Football Club in the Australian Football League (AFL).

Fields was raised on the Gold Coast. He played football for North East Australian Football League club Labrador, and he represented Queensland at the 2011 AFL Under 18 Championships. After the 2012 season, Fields moved to Adelaide and played in the South Australian National Football League for South Adelaide as a tall attacking defender, where he played for two seasons.

Fields was then recruited to the AFL at age 22 by Carlton in the third round of the 2015 Rookie Draft (pick No. 41 overall). He played much of the 2015 season with Carlton's VFL-affiliate, the Northern Blues, before making his senior AFL debut in round 15, 2015. He was delisted in October 2015.

Fields is the son of Neville Fields, who played 200 Victorian Football League games for Essendon and South Melbourne. Fields became noted during his time in the SANFL for his ability to kick long torpedo punts, and prior to being drafted by Carlton he had considered his options of studying and playing American football as a punter at an American college.
