= Neville Fields =

Australian rules footballer

Personal information
- Full name: Neville Fields
- Born: 21 November 1951 (age 74)
- Original team: Essendon High School
- Height: 180 cm (5 ft 11 in)
- Weight: 79 kg (174 lb)
- Position: Centreman

Playing career^{1}
Years	Club	Games (Goals)
1969–1977	Essendon	135 (134)
1978–1981	South Melbourne	60 (55)
1981–1982 Total –	Essendon	5 (4)
Total		200 (193)
- ^{1} Playing statistics correct to the end of 1982.

Career highlights
- 1972 W. S. Crichton Medal winner

Neville Fields (born 21 November 1951) is a former Australian rules footballer who played with Essendon and South Melbourne in the Victorian Football League (VFL).

Fields was a left-footed centreman and won Essendon's most improved player award in 1971. He was their best and fairest the following season and represented Victoria in interstate football. After struggling for form throughout 1977, he was traded to South Melbourne for Terry Daniher. In 1981, he returned to Essendon, where he spent a further two seasons.

Fields's son Tom played two matches for Carlton Football Club in 2015.
