= Tom Lamb (footballer) =

Australian rules footballer

Personal information
- Full name: Thomas Lamb
- Nickname: lamby
- Born: 19 October 1996 (age 30)
- Original team: Dandenong Stingrays (TAC Cup)
- Draft: No. 32, 2014 national draft
- Height: 193 cm (6 ft 4 in)
- Weight: 82 kg (181 lb)
- Position: forward

Playing career^{1}
| Years | Club | Games (Goals) |
| 2015–2017 | West Coast | 1 (1) |
- ^{1} Playing statistics correct to the end of 2017.

Tom Lamb (born 19 October 1996) is a former professional Australian rules footballer who played for the West Coast Eagles in the Australian Football League (AFL).

Tom Lamb is the son of Wayne Lamb, who played for Melbourne and Fitzroy during the 1990s, and the grandson of St Kilda's 1966 premiership winning forward, Ian Cooper, who got best on the ground in the 1966 Grand Final for St Kilda.

As a junior, Lamb played at Edithvale-Aspendale Junior Football Club.

== AFL career ==
Lamb was drafted to the Eagles in the 2014 AFL draft. He made his AFL debut in Round 1, 2015 against the Western Bulldogs starting as the substitute. After coming on during the first quarter, Lamb gathered 10 touches, took 4 marks and scored a goal as the Eagles lost by 10 points to the home team. He was delisted by West Coast at the end of the 2017 season.

== WAFL career ==
Since being drafted to the West Coast Eagles Lamb has played the majority of his football for the Eagles' feeder club, East Perth Football Club in the West Australian Football League (WAFL). In his first season, he impressed at the Royals playing 10 games and kicking 17 goals.
