= Matthew Dick =

Australian rules footballer

Personal information
- Born: 3 November 1994 (age 32)
- Original team: Calder Cannons
- Draft: No. 64, 2012 National Draft, Sydney
- Height: 187 cm (6 ft 2 in)
- Weight: 90 kg (198 lb)
- Position: Defender / Midfielder

Playing career^{1}
Years	Club	Games (Goals)
2015–2016	Carlton	6 (0)
- ^{1} Playing statistics correct to the end of 2016.

Matthew Dick (born 3 November 1994) is a former professional Australian rules footballer who played with the Carlton Football Club in the Australian Football League (AFL).

Dick was drafted in the third round of the 2012 National Draft by Sydney. He spent two years on their list but did not get a senior game and was delisted. Dick was signed by Carlton as a delisted free agent during the 2014 free agency period. He made his debut against St Kilda in Round 4, 2015, and played a total of six senior games in his debut season for the club.

In August 2016, Dick was delisted from Carlton.

== Statistics ==
Legend
G	Goals	K	Kicks	D	Disposals	T	Tackles
B	Behinds	H	Handballs	M	Marks

Season	Team	No.	Games	Totals							Averages (per game)						
Season	Team	No.	Games	G	B	K	H	D	M	T	G	B	K	H	D	M	T
2013	Sydney	31	0	—	—	—	—	—	—	—	—	—	—	—	—	—	—
2014	Sydney	31	0	—	—	—	—	—	—	—	—	—	—	—	—	—	—
2015	Carlton	31	6	0	2	40	30	70	20	12	0.0	0.3	6.7	5.0	11.7	3.3	2.0
2016	Carlton	31	0	—	—	—	—	—	—	—	—	—	—	—	—	—	—
Career			6	0	2	40	30	70	20	12	0.0	0.3	6.7	5.0	11.7	3.3	2.0
