= Blaine Boekhorst =

Australian rules footballer (born 1993)

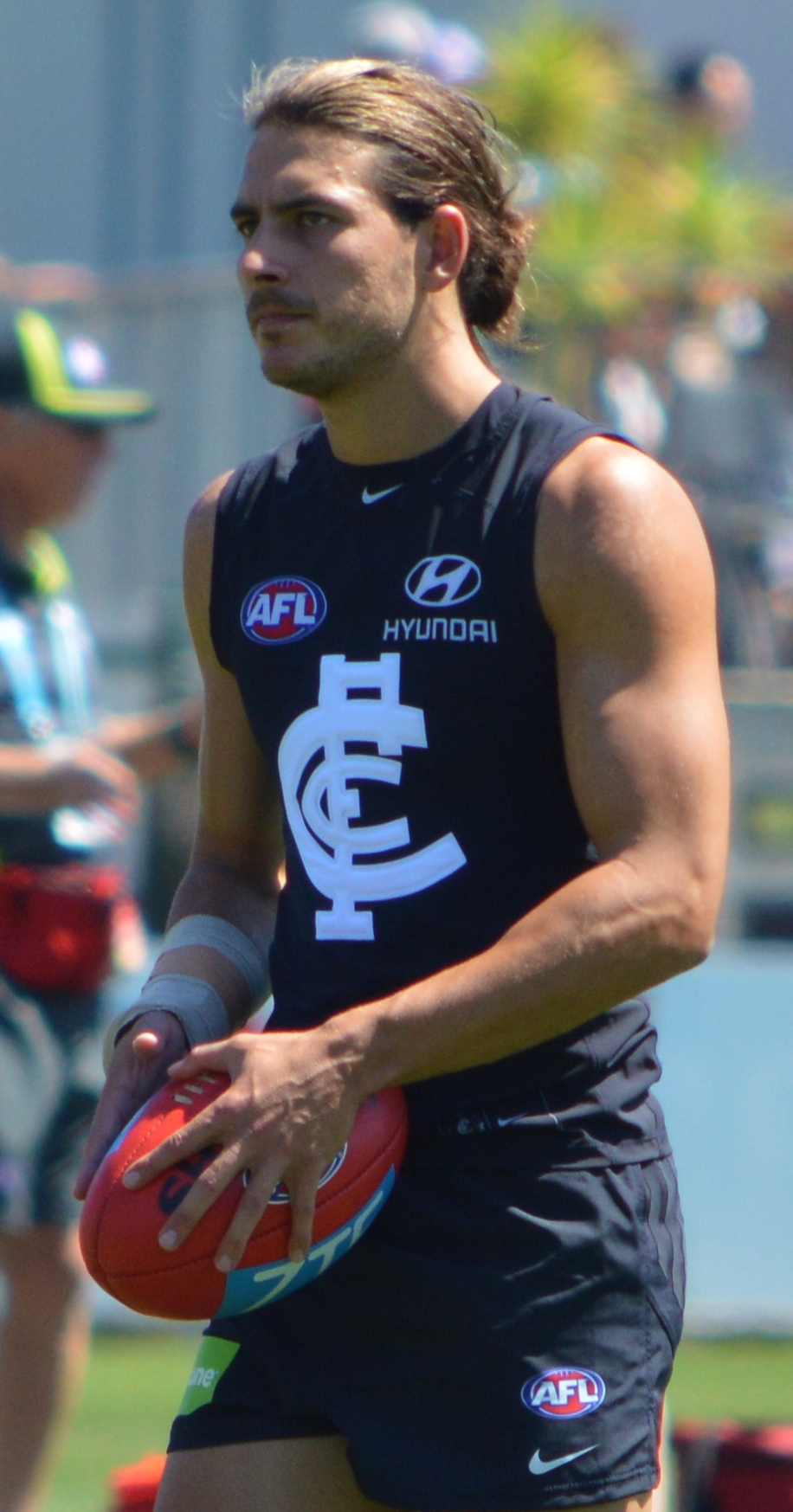
- Boekhorst in March 2017

Personal information
- Born: 2 September 1993 (age 33)
- Original teams: Swan Districts, (WAFL)
- Draft: No. 19, 2014 National Draft,Carlton
- Height: 184 cm (6 ft 0 in)
- Weight: 75 kg (165 lb)
- Position: Midfielder

Club information
- Current club: East Fremantle
- Number: 9

Playing career^{1}
Years	Club	Games (Goals)
2011–2013	Swan Districts	44 (17)
2015–2017	Carlton	25 (15)
2018–	East Fremantle	62 (42)
Total		106 (59)
- ^{1} Playing statistics correct to the end of round 1, 2025.

Career highlights
- WAFL Sandover Medal 2022

Blaine Boekhorst (born 2 September 1993) is a former professional Australian rules footballer who played for the Carlton Football Club in the Australian Football League (AFL).

Boekhorst was raised in Port Hedland, in northern Western Australia. His mother was born in India, while his father is a third-generation Australian of Dutch descent. He attended Wesley College in South Perth. Boekhorst played his colts football for Swan Districts in the West Australian Football League. He progressed through the minor grades to the seniors at Swan Districts, and cemented a regular senior place in the team in 2014. Boekhorst played a total of 44 games for Swans between 2011 and 2014.

Boekhorst was drafted at age 21 to the AFL by Carlton with its first-round selection in the 2014 National Draft (pick No. 19 overall). He made his senior debut against St Kilda in Round 4 of the 2015 season.

After the end of the 2017 season, Carlton informed Boekhorst he would not be offered a new contract with the club.

He was awarded the Sandover Medal as the player adjudged fairest and best throughout the 2022 WAFL season.

== Statistics ==
Statistics are correct to the end of 2017 Season.

Legend
G	Goals	K	Kicks	D	Disposals	T	Tackles
B	Behinds	H	Handballs	M	Marks

Season	Team	No.	Games	Totals							Averages (per game)						
Season	Team	No.	Games	G	B	K	H	D	M	T	G	B	K	H	D	M	T
2015	Carlton	12	11	5	9	76	62	138	24	26	0.45	0.82	6.91	5.64	12.55	2.18	2.36
2016	Carlton	12	7	3	3	53	41	94	27	14	0.43	0.43	7.57	5.86	13.43	3.86	2
2017	Carlton	12	7	7	1	77	39	116	31	21	1	0.14	11	5.57	16.57	4.43	3
Career			25	15	13	206	142	348	82	61	0.63	0.46	8.49	5.69	14.18	3.49	2.45
