= Roarke Smith =

Australian rules footballer

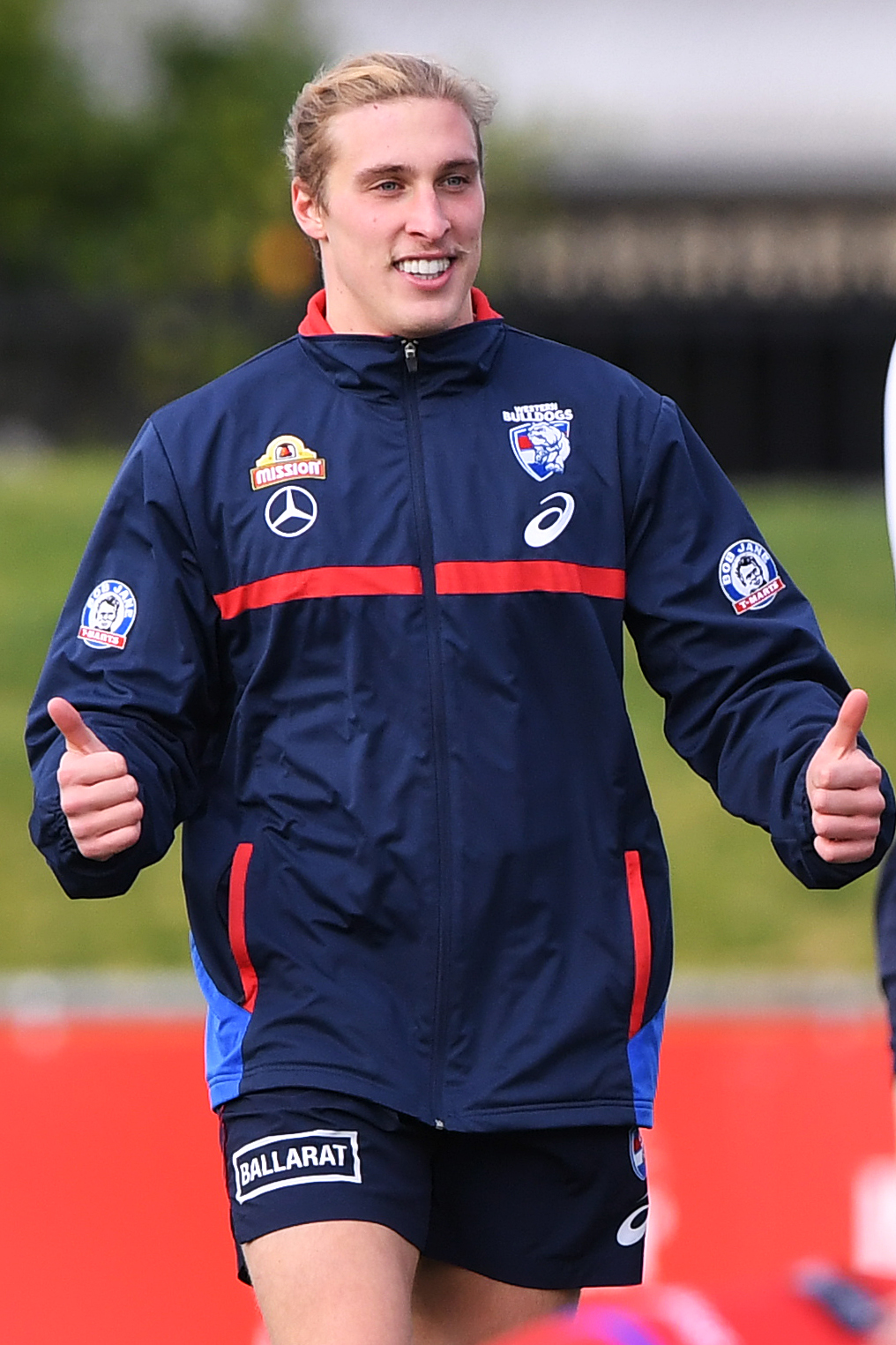
- Smith in August 2018

Personal information
- Full name: Roarke Smith
- Born: 11 September 1996 (age 30)
- Original team: Calder Cannons (TAC Cup)
- Draft: No. 5, 2015 rookie draft
- Height: 182 cm (6 ft 0 in)
- Weight: 80 kg (176 lb)
- Position: midfielder / Defender

Playing career^{1}
Years	Club	Games (Goals)
2015–2023	Western Bulldogs	47 (14)
- ^{1} Playing statistics correct to the end of 2023.

Career highlights
- VFL premiership player: 2016

Roarke Smith (born 11 September 1996) is a former Australian rules footballer who played for the Western Bulldogs in the Australian Football League (AFL) from 2015 until 2023. Smith was drafted with the fifth selection in the 2015 rookie draft. He made his AFL debut late in the 2015 season against West Coast. Just one week after his debut, he suffered an Anterior cruciate ligament injury which left him injured until July 2016. He played in the Bulldogs' 2016 VFL premiership team. In March 2017, he again ruptured his ACL. He was delisted by the Western Bulldogs at the conclusion of the 2017 season. He was later re-drafted by the Western Bulldogs in the 2018 rookie draft. He was involved in a car crash in 2018 which saw him miss one game. After having a breakout 2021 season, playing 14 games (4 being finals), he signed on with the Bulldogs on the main list.

== Statistics ==
Statistics are correct to the end of the 2021 season

Legend
G	Goals	K	Kicks	D	Disposals	T	Tackles
B	Behinds	H	Handballs	M	Marks

Season	Team	No.	Games	Totals							Averages (per game)						
Season	Team	No.	Games	G	B	K	H	D	M	T	G	B	K	H	D	M	T
2015	Western Bulldogs	37	1	—	—	3	6	9	3	1	0.0	0.0	3.0	6.0	9.0	3.0	1.0
2016	Western Bulldogs	37	1	—	—	8	4	12	5	1	—	—	8.0	4.0	12.0	5.0	1.0
2017	Western Bulldogs	37	—	—	—	—	—	—	—	—	—	—	—	—	—	—	—
2018	Western Bulldogs	37	10	—	1	50	70	120	20	14	—	0.1	5.0	7.0	12.0	2.0	1.4
2019	Western Bulldogs	37	5	4	1	35	24	59	13	12	0.8	0.2	7.0	4.8	11.8	2.6	2.4
2020 (Note: The 2020 season was played with 17 home-and-away matches per team (down from 22) and 16-minute quarters with time on (down from 20-minute quarters with time on) due to the impact of the COVID-19 pandemic.)	Western Bulldogs	37	6	2	1	29	41	70	12	8	0.3	0.2	4.8	6.8	11.7	2	1.3
2021	Western Bulldogs	37	14	3	4	79	88	167	28	34	0.2	0.3	5.6	6.3	11.9	2.1	2.4
Career			37	9	7	204	233	437	82	70	0.2	0.2	5.5	6.3	11.8	2.2	1.9
