= Shaun McKernan =

Australian rules footballer

Personal information
- Full name: Shaun McKernan
- Born: 1 September 1990 (age 36)
- Original team: Calder Cannons (TAC Cup)
- Draft: No. 28, 2008 national draft
- Height: 196 cm (6 ft 5 in)
- Weight: 100 kg (220 lb)
- Position: Forward / ruckman

Playing career^{1}
Years	Club	Games (Goals)
2009–2014	Adelaide	34 (21)
2015–2020	Essendon	53 (51)
2021	St Kilda	4 (2)
Total		91 (74)
- ^{1} Playing statistics correct to the end of 2021.

Shaun McKernan (born 1 September 1990) is a former Australian rules footballer having played for the St Kilda Football Club, Essendon Football Club and the Adelaide Football Club in the Australian Football League (AFL).

== AFL career ==
=== Adelaide ===
McKernan was drafted by Adelaide with pick 28 in the 2008 national draft. McKernan showed glimpses of his potential but soft tissue injuries and untimely suspensions meant he failed to cement a regular AFL spot. After six seasons and 34 games with the club, Adelaide delisted him.

=== Essendon ===
He joined Essendon with pick 12 in the 2014 rookie draft. In November 2016, McKernan was delisted by Essendon, however, he was re-drafted by Essendon in the 2017 rookie draft. McKernan was mainly used as a forward target with the occasional role of relieving in the ruck. McKernan played 16 games in 2019, of which nine were victories and was selected in the Bombers' Elimination Final team. In that season he also kicked 4 goals twice; against Melbourne in round three and Gold Coast in round 19. In a COVID-interrupted season, McKernan played nine of a possible 17 games for the Bombers for four wins, four losses and a draw. Of his final season at Essendon in 2020, McKernan admitted that he had 'fallen out love with the game' and that he "wasn’t happy with how my time finished at Essendon." McKernan wasn't interviewed as part of Essendon's football review at the end of 2020, of which he stated "for [Essendon] is probably a good thing because I would have been pretty honest." Essendon ultimately delisted McKernan and five others on 20 September 2020.

=== St Kilda ===
On 6 November 2020, McKernan joined St Kilda as a Free Agent. McKernan was courted by a number of clubs including Melbourne, but ultimately signed for the Saints. McKernan preferenced the Saints due to their closer proximity to his home, compared with Melbourne's training base at Casey Fields. McKernan was brought in primarily as injury coverage for the Saints' forwards.

With 1 round remaining in the 2021 season McKernan announced his retirement after not being offered a contract for 2022.

== Family ==
He is the younger brother of North Melbourne premiership ruckman and Leigh Matthews Trophy winner Corey McKernan.

== Statistics ==
Statistics are correct to the end of 2020.

Legend
G	Goals	K	Kicks	D	Disposals	T	Tackles
B	Behinds	H	Handballs	M	Marks	H/O	Hit-outs

Season	Team	No.	Games	Totals								Averages (per game)							
Season	Team	No.	Games	G	B	K	H	D	M	T	H/O	G	B	K	H	D	M	T	H/O
2009	Adelaide	35	1	—	1	4	4	8	2	3	—	—	1.0	4.0	4.0	8.0	2.0	3.0	0.0
2010	Adelaide	35	0	—	—	—	—	—	—	—	—	—	—	—	—	—	—	—	-
2011	Adelaide	35	16	10	8	98	38	136	60	24	92	0.6	0.5	6.1	2.4	8.5	3.7	1.5	5.7
2012	Adelaide	35	6	3	4	28	22	50	9	4	85	0.5	0.7	4.7	3.6	8.3	1.5	0.7	14.2
2013	Adelaide	35	9	7	10	62	44	106	35	22	73	0.8	1.1	6.9	4.9	11.8	3.9	2.4	8.1
2014	Adelaide	35	2	1	1	10	11	21	3	3	10	0.5	0.5	5.0	5.5	10.5	1.5	1.5	6.0
2015	Essendon	44	9	6	3	86	79	165	34	14	206	0.7	0.3	9.6	8.8	18.5	3.8	1.6	22.9
2016	Essendon	44	6	4	1	44	21	65	20	8	41	07	0.2	7.3	3.5	10.8	3.3	1.3	6.8
2017	Essendon	44	3	3	-	18	19	37	12	3	51	1.0	0.0	6.0	6.3	12.3	4.0	2.3	17.0
2018	Essendon	44	10	16	11	95	38	133	56	21	81	1.6	1.1	9.5	3.8	13.3	5.6	2.1	8.1
2019	Essendon	44	16	17	11	136	58	194	81	30	116	1.1	0.7	8.5	3.6	12.1	5.1	1.9	7.3
2020	Essendon	44	9	5	6	48	24	72	31	11	41	0.6	0.7	5.3	2.7	8.0	3.4	1.2	4.6
Career			87	72	56	629	358	987	343	147	798	0.8	0.6	7.2	4.1	11.3	3.9	1.7	9.2
