= Connor Blakely =

Australian rules footballer (born 1996)

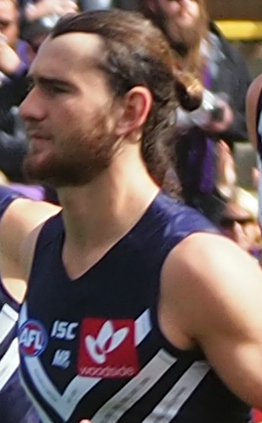
- Blakely playing for Fremantle in August 2016

Personal information
- Full name: Connor Mark Blakely
- Born: 2 March 1996 (age 30)
- Original team: Swan Districts (WAFL)
- Draft: No. 34, 2014 National draft, Fremantle
- Height: 188 cm (6 ft 2 in)
- Weight: 85 kg (187 lb)
- Position: Midfielder

Club information
- Current club: Gold Coast
- Number: 26

Playing career^{1}
Years	Club	Games (Goals)
2015–2022	Fremantle	78 (3)
2023	Gold Coast	0 (0)
Total		78 (3)
- ^{1} Playing statistics correct to the end of 2022.

Career highlights
- Peel Thunder Best and Fairest: 2015; AFL Rising Star nominee: 2016; WAFL premiership player: 2016; Simpson Medal: 2016; VFL premiership player: 2023

Connor Mark Blakely (born 2 March 1996) is a former Australian rules footballer who played for the Fremantle Football Club and the Gold Coast Suns in the Australian Football League (AFL).

== Early career ==
Originally from Bunbury, Western Australia, he was drafted with the 34th selection in the 2014 National Draft from Swan Districts in the West Australian Football League (WAFL). He made his league debut in 2013, and then in 2014 played all season in Swan Districts league team. He also represented Western Australia at the 2014 AFL Under 18 Championships, where he was selected to the tournament's All-Australian team. In 2015 he played for Peel Thunder in the West Australian Football League (WAFL), Fremantle's reserve team. He was awarded the clubs Best and Fairest award at the seasons end.

He again played for Peel during the 2016 WAFL season and was a part of their inaugural premiership, beating Subiaco by 23 points. He was awarded the Simpson Medal for the best player on ground.

== AFL career ==
Blakely was selected to make his AFL debut for Fremantle in the final round of the 2015 AFL season, when Fremantle sent a weakened team to play Port Adelaide at the Adelaide Oval. Twelve changes were made to the team, and Blakely was one of four players to make their AFL debuts.

Blakely was awarded a 2016 AFL Rising Star nomination during round 11 against Essendon at Domain Stadium, collecting 25 disposals and 7 tackles.

In July 2019, Blakely signed a three-year contract extension with Fremantle, to remain at the club until the end of 2022.

Following the conclusion of the 2022 AFL season Blakely was delisted by Fremantle, but was picked up as a rookie by Gold Coast in the subsequent rookie draft.

Blakely spent the entirety of 2023 playing for Gold Coast's reserve team in the Victorian Football League, and was a part of the clubs inaugural VFL grand final win. After one season with the Gold Coast Suns, Blakely announced his retirement from AFL Football, stating “I’m at a point in my life where I’m ready to let go of football…”.

In 2024 Blakely told the Cal Newport podcast that he used his AFL experience to become a sports turf specialist and started playing cricket and had travelled to England to play cricket there.

== Statistics ==
Statistics are correct to the end of round 10, 2022

Legend
G	Goals	K	Kicks	D	Disposals	T	Tackles
B	Behinds	H	Handballs	M	Marks

Season	Team	No.	Games	Totals							Averages (per game)							Votes
Season	Team	No.	Games	G	B	K	H	D	M	T	G	B	K	H	D	M	T	Votes
2015	Fremantle	19	1	0	0	3	9	12	1	1	0.0	0.0	3.0	9.0	12.0	1.0	1.0	0
2016	Fremantle	19	15	1	6	129	175	304	40	56	0.1	0.4	8.6	11.7	20.3	2.7	3.7	3
2017	Fremantle	19	17	1	4	210	196	406	88	67	0.1	0.2	12.4	11.5	23.9	5.2	3.9	5
2018	Fremantle	19	13	0	1	172	137	309	92	33	0.0	0.1	13.2	10.5	23.8	7.1	2.5	1
2019	Fremantle	19	14	0	0	156	121	277	72	32	0.0	0.0	11.1	8.6	19.8	5.1	2.3	0
2020 (Note: The 2020 season was played with 17 home-and-away matches per team (down from 22) and 16-minute quarters with time on (down from 20-minute quarters with time on) due to the impact of the COVID-19 pandemic.)	Fremantle	19	5	0	0	26	49	75	12	12	0.0	0.0	5.2	9.8	15.0	2.4	2.4	0
2021	Fremantle	19	13	1	2	50	66	116	30	11	0.1	0.2	3.8	5.1	8.9	2.3	0.8	0
2022	Fremantle	19	0	–	–	–	–	–	–	–	–	–	–	–	–	–	–	–
Career			78	3	13	746	753	1499	335	212	0.0	0.2	9.6	9.7	19.2	4.3	2.7	9
