= Brad Walsh (footballer) =

Australian rules footballer

Personal information
- Full name: Bradley Walsh
- Born: 3 September 1996 (age 30)
- Original teams: Peel Thunder WAFL, Rockingham Rams (WA), Kolbe Catholic College (WA)
- Height: 180 cm (5 ft 11 in)
- Weight: 81 kg (179 lb)
- Position: Midfielder

Playing career^{1}
Years	Club	Games (Goals)
2015	Carlton	3 (1)
- ^{1} Playing statistics correct to the end of 2015.

Bradley Walsh (born 3 September 1996) is a former professional Australian rules footballer who played for the Carlton Football Club in the Australian Football League (AFL).

A solid inside midfielder from Rockingham, Walsh played colts (under-19) football for Peel Thunder, and played a handful of senior games for Peel as a teenager in 2013 and 2014. His onfield leadership as a junior was well regarded, and consequently he captained Western Australia at the 2014 AFL Under 18 Championships. Walsh also represented Western Australia at basketball as a junior.

Walsh was recruited to the AFL by Carlton in the second round of the 2015 Rookie Draft (pick No. 24 overall). He played most of the 2015 season with Carlton's VFL-affiliate, the Northern Blues, winning the VFL club's best and fairest award for the season, and he played three senior AFL games for the year, making his debut in Round 16, 2015. He was delisted in October 2015.
