= Shane Biggs =

Australian rules footballer

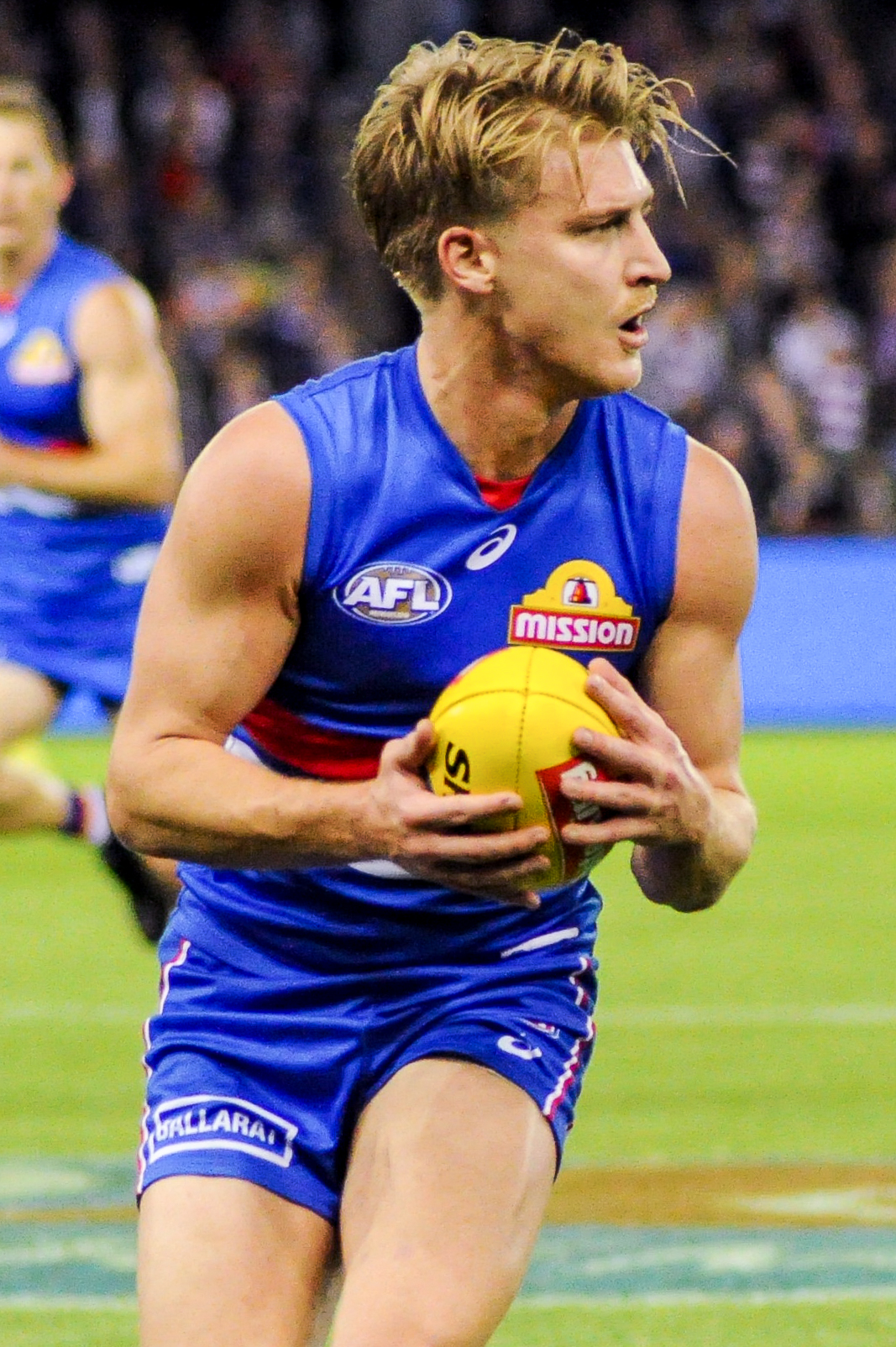
- Biggs playing for the Western Bulldogs in June 2017

Personal information
- Full name: Shane Biggs
- Born: 5 August 1991 (age 35)
- Original team: Bendigo (VFL)
- Draft: No. 13, 2012 rookie draft

Playing career^{1}
Years	Club	Games (Goals)
2012–2014	Sydney	6 (0)
2015–2018	Western Bulldogs	57 (8)
Total		63 (8)
- ^{1} Playing statistics correct to the end of 2018.

Career highlights
- AFL premiership player (2016)

Shane Biggs (born 5 August 1991) is a former Australian rules footballer who played for the Sydney Swans and the Western Bulldogs in the Australian Football League (AFL). He was originally recruited by the Sydney Swans from the Bendigo Football Club in the Victorian Football League (VFL) with the 13th selection in the 2012 Rookie Draft. Biggs did not play in the TAC Cup competition, the traditional pathway into the AFL for Victorians.

He was elevated from the rookie list to the senior list in July 2013, and made his AFL debut in the final round of the 2013 AFL season. Biggs was then dropped for the qualifying final, before regaining his place for the semi and preliminary finals.

Biggs announced his retirement at the end of the 2018 season.

== Statistics ==
Statistics are correct to the end of the 2016 season

Legend
G	Goals	K	Kicks	D	Disposals	T	Tackles
B	Behinds	H	Handballs	M	Marks

Season	Team	No.	Games	Totals							Averages (per game)						
Season	Team	No.	Games	G	B	K	H	D	M	T	G	B	K	H	D	M	T
2013	Sydney	46	3	0	0	28	26	54	13	4	0.0	0.0	9.3	8.7	18.0	4.3	1.3
2014	Sydney	46	3	0	0	31	20	51	9	12	0.0	0.0	10.3	6.7	17.0	3.0	4.0
2015	Western Bulldogs	24	10	3	0	141	56	197	34	21	0.3	0.0	14.1	5.6	19.7	3.4	2.1
2016^{#}	Western Bulldogs	24	26	4	2	334	212	546	116	54	0.2	0.1	12.8	8.2	21.0	4.5	2.1
Career			42	7	2	534	314	848	172	91	0.2	0.0	12.7	7.5	20.2	4.1	2.2

== Honours and achievements ==
- Team
  - AFL premiership: 2016
