= Jackson Nelson =

Australian rules footballer (born 1996)

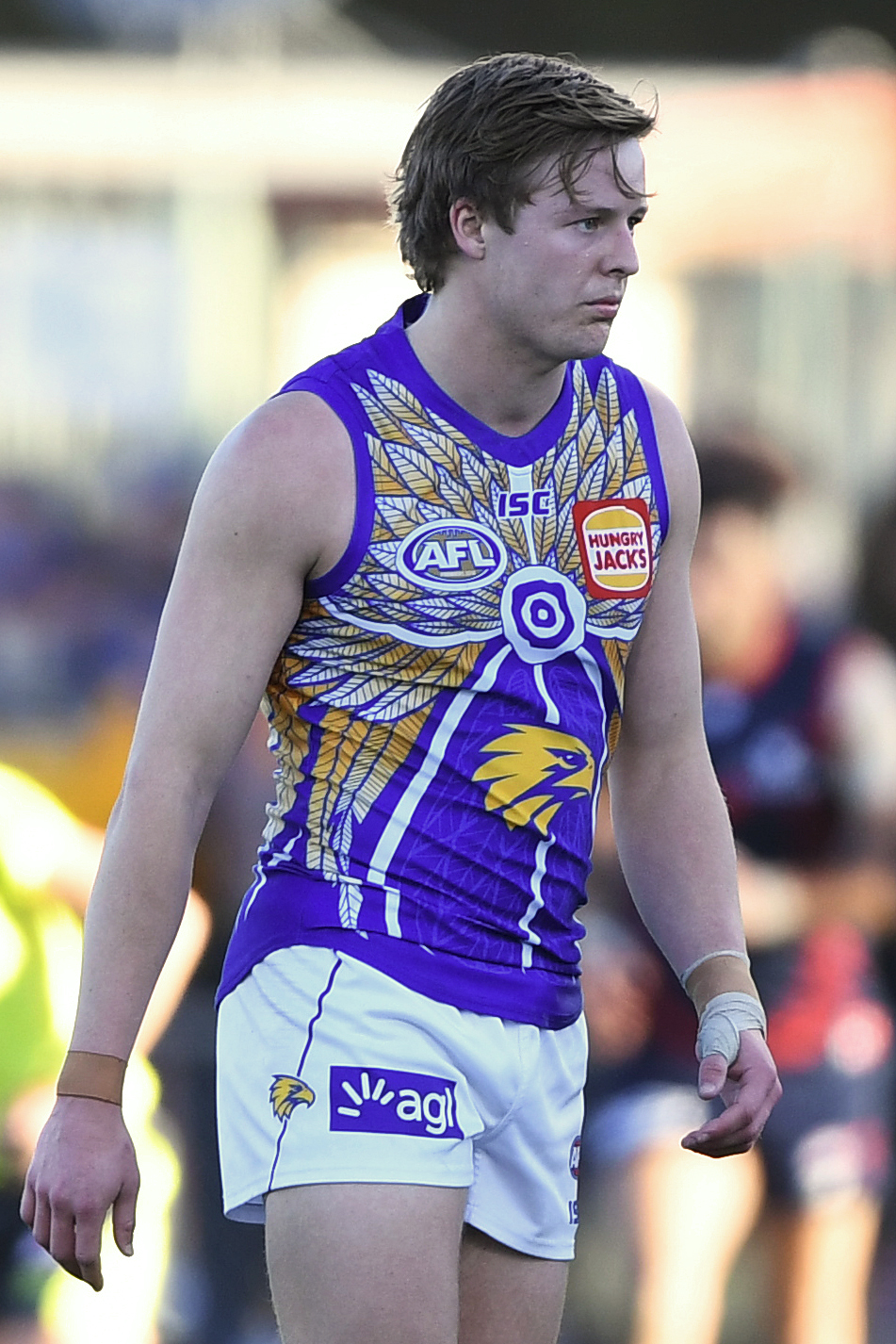
- Nelson playing for West Coast in July 2019

Personal information
- Born: 15 March 1996 (age 30)
- Original team: Geelong Falcons (TAC Cup)
- Draft: No. 51, 2014 national draft, West Coast
- Height: 187 cm (6 ft 2 in)
- Weight: 85 kg (187 lb)
- Position: Defender

Club information
- Current club: Old Geelong

Playing career^{1}
Years	Club	Games (Goals)
2015–2022	West Coast	102 (2)
- ^{1} Playing statistics correct to the end of 2022.

Jackson Nelson (born 15 March 1996) is an Australian rules footballer who currently plays for Old Geelong in the Victorian Amateur Football Association (VAFA). He previously played for the West Coast Eagles in the Australian Football League (AFL) from 2015 until 2022, and then served as captain of West Coast's reserves team in the West Australian Football League (WAFL) from 2023 until the end of the 2024 season.

== Career ==
=== Junior career ===
Nelson played junior football for St Mary's. He later represented the Geelong Falcons in the TAC Cup, where he played 12 matches while averaging 20 disposals. In 2014, he played for Vic Country at the AFL Under 18 Championships, averaging four tackles and 12 disposals in six matches. Nelson was drafted by West Coast with pick 51 in the 2014 national draft.

=== AFL career ===
Nelson made his AFL debut in the opening round of the 2015 AFL season after impressing coach Adam Simpson during the NAB Challenge. He played 11 games for West Coast in 2015 and nine with West Australian Football League (WAFL) affiliate East Perth.

Nelson played the first four rounds of the 2016 AFL season before being dropped to the WAFL. He responded with a strong performance against Swan Districts, playing a midfield role rather than defence. He amassed 29 touches, six tackles, seven marks and six inside-50s. Nelson finished the year with eight matches in the AFL and the WAFL.

He strung five matches together at the start of the 2017 AFL season, before breaking his wrist in the second quarter of a loss to Hawthorn. Despite the injury, Nelson recorded five tackles and 17 possessions after carrying on the match. He missed three weeks of football, although he continued running in training, and returned with a 15-disposal, one-goal effort for East Perth. In July, Nelson extended his contract by two years (until 2019). He played 13 AFL matches and two WAFL matches for the year, polling one vote in East Perth's best and fairest.

In 2018, Nelson played 10 AFL matches but missed the grand final. He played nine games in the WAFL, including a match against Perth in which he was reported for striking Cody Ninyette. Nelson received a one-match suspension.

At the end of the 2022 season, Nelson was delisted by the Eagles.

=== Post-AFL career ===
Despite his AFL delisting, Nelson remained at West Coast and signed with the club's reserves team in the WAFL for the 2023 season, becoming the team's captain. At the end of the 2024 WAFL season, he left the Eagles and returned to Victoria, where he signed with Old Geelong in the Victorian Amateur Football Association (VAFA).
