= 2024 Brownlow Medal =

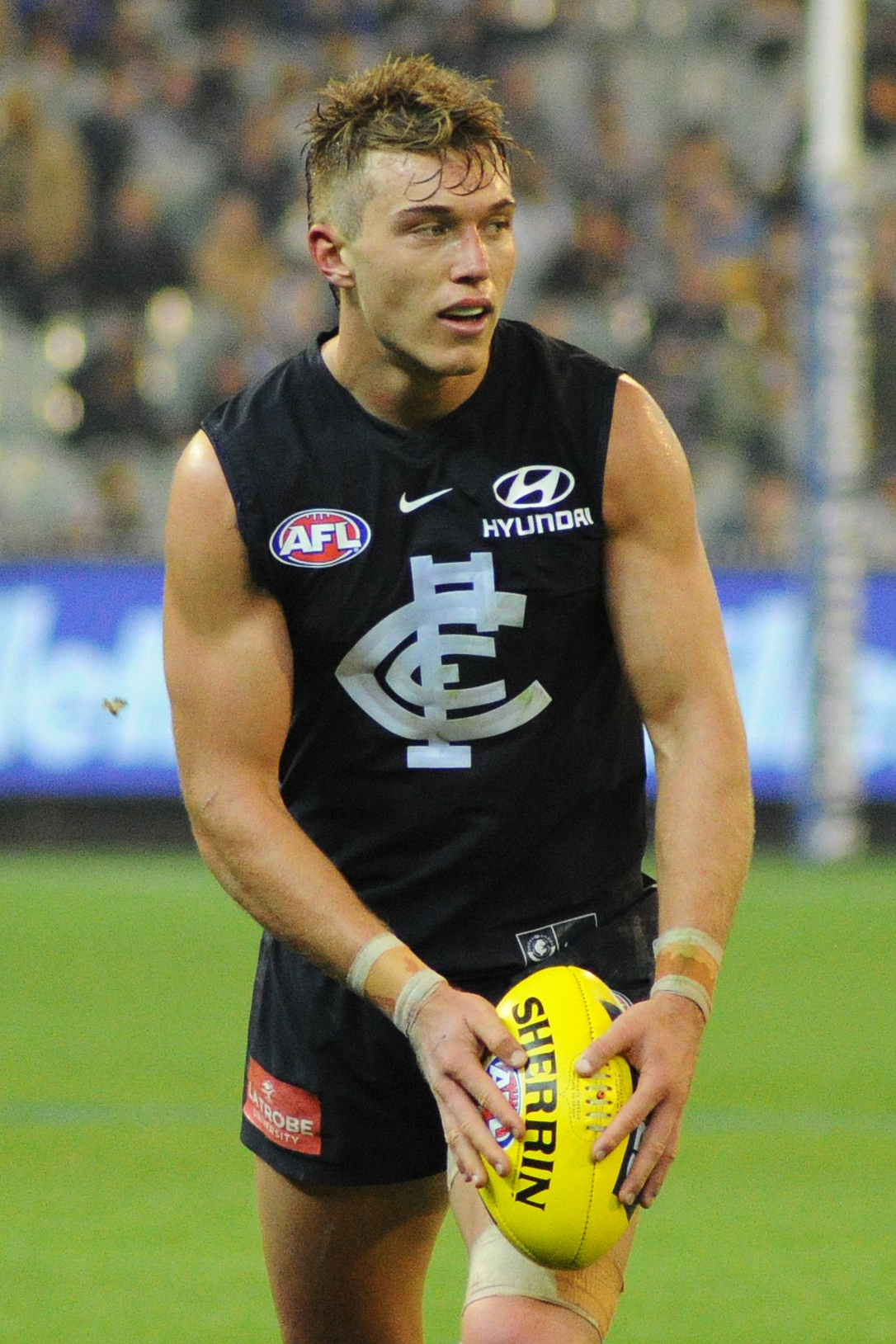
- 2024 Brownlow Medallist, Patrick Cripps
- Date: Monday, 23 September 2024
- Location: Crown Palladium
- Hosted by: Hamish McLachlan and Rebecca Maddern
- Winner: Patrick Cripps (Carlton)

Television/radio coverage
- Network: Seven Network; Telstra

The 2024 Brownlow Medal was the 97th year the award was presented to the player adjudged the best and fairest player during the Australian Football League (AFL) home-and-away season. The count took place on Monday 23 September in Melbourne at the Crown Palladium, five days before the grand final. Patrick Cripps of Carlton won the medal with 45 votes; it was his second medal, having previously won the medal in 2022.

Cripps tally of 45 votes broke by a considerable margin the previous record for most votes in a Brownlow Medal count under the 3–2–1 voting system, which was 36 votes held by Dustin Martin (2017) and Ollie Wines (2021); 2024 runner-up Nick Daicos also exceeded the prior record, polling 38 votes. Cripps also set a new record by polling 1.96 votes per game across the season, breaking Lachie Neale's 2020 record of 1.82.

== Reactions ==
The record vote counts were described as "farcical" and the Brownlow "broken beyond recognition" as Patrick Cripps won with 45 votes, then the highest total in history. Max Laughton of Fox Sports wrote: "we have reached new levels of utterly bonkers vote inflation." There were calls for an overhaul of the voting system, with many in the AFL community saying there's no way Cripps had the greatest season ever seen. Tim Miller at the Roar wrote: "It's surely not controversial to say that Cripps' season, while excellent, was not a patch on [Dustin Martin]'s halcyon year; while the comparisons to Brownlow counts 20 years or more ago, when 20 votes more often than not was enough to claim victory, take the Blue's Brownlow win to the point of farce." Broadcaster Gerard Whateley wrote in response to the count: "In the past 15 years there's been an incredible concentration of votes awarded to the stars of the game. Last night we turbo-charged into a superstar league ... It was a wonder to behold ... if slightly vexing ... The sheer magnitude of the voting should be pause for recalibration." He continued: "...This time last year we argued the umpires simply must be allowed to see the stats post game ... It's time to give the umpires the best chance to cast votes to protect the prestige of the Brownlow."

== Leading vote-getters ==
=== Overall ===
| | Player | Club | Votes |
|---|---|---|---|
| 1st | Patrick Cripps | Carlton | 45 |
| 2nd | Nick Daicos | Collingwood | 38 |
| 3rd | Zak Butters | Port Adelaide | 29 |
| 4th | Caleb Serong | Fremantle | 28 |
| N/A | Isaac Heeney | Sydney | 28* |
| 5th | Tom Green | Greater Western Sydney | 27 |
| 6th | Adam Treloar | Western Bulldogs | 26 |
| =7th | Errol Gulden | Sydney | 25 |
| =7th | Matt Rowell | Gold Coast | 25 |
| 9th | Jai Newcombe | Hawthorn | 24 |
| 10th | Chad Warner | Sydney | 23 |

* The player was ineligible to win the medal due to suspension by the AFL Tribunal during the year.

=== Most votes per club ===
| Club rank | Overall rank | Player | Club | Votes |
|---|---|---|---|---|
| 1st | 1st | Patrick Cripps | Carlton | 45 |
| 2nd | 2nd | Nick Daicos | Collingwood | 38 |
| 3rd | 3rd | Zak Butters | Port Adelaide | 29 |
| 4th | 4th | Caleb Serong | Fremantle | 28 |
| 4th* | 4th* | Isaac Heeney | Sydney | 28* |
| 6th | 6th | Tom Green | Greater Western Sydney | 27 |
| 7th | 7th | Adam Treloar | Western Bulldogs | 26 |
| 8th | 8th | Matt Rowell | Gold Coast | 25 |
| 9th | 10th | Jai Newcombe | Hawthorn | 24 |
| 10th | 12th | Lachie Neale | Brisbane Lions | 22 |
| 11th | 16th | Luke Davies-Uniacke | North Melbourne | 18 |
| 11th | 16th | Zach Merrett | Essendon | 18 |
| 11th | 16th | Jordan Dawson | Adelaide | 18 |
| 14th | 19th | Christian Petracca | Melbourne | 16 |
| 14th | 19th | Jeremy Cameron | Geelong | 16 |
| 14th | 19th | Rowan Marshall | St Kilda | 16 |
| 17th | 45th | Elliot Yeo | West Coast | 8 |
| 18th | 67th | Tim Taranto | Richmond | 5 |
| 18th | 67th | Shai Bolton | Richmond | 5 |

* *Ineligible due to suspension.

== Voting procedure and eligibility ==
The four field umpires (those umpires who control the flow of the game, as opposed to goal or boundary umpires) confer after each match and award three votes, two votes, and one vote to the players they regard as the best, second-best and third-best in the match, respectively. The votes are kept secret until the awards night, and they are read and tallied on the evening.

Any suspension throughout the home-and-away season renders a player ineligible to win the award. However, umpires must still award votes to any player they deem worthy and all votes are tallied regardless of ineligibility.

In the event of an ineligible player receiving the most votes, the next eligible player is awarded the Brownlow Medal.

There is no countback if there is a tie on votes, with joint winners awarded.
