= 2015 Carlton Football Club season =

Carlton Football Club
2015 season
- President: Mark LoGiudice
- Coach: Mick Malthouse (Rds 1–8); John Barker (Rds 9–23)
- Captain: Marc Murphy
- Home grounds: Melbourne Cricket Ground (Training and administrative: Ikon Park)
- AFL season: 18th (4–18)
- John Nicholls Medal: Patrick Cripps
- Leading goalkicker: Andrejs Everitt
- Club membership: 47,305

The 2015 Carlton Football Club season was the Carlton Football Club's 152nd season of competition, and 119th as a member of the Australian Football League.

Competing in the 2015 AFL season, it was a very poor season for the club and was disrupted by the sacking after only eight rounds of third-year coach Mick Malthouse. Carlton finished last on the ladder with a record of 4–18.

== Club summary ==
The 2015 AFL season was the 119th season of the VFL/AFL competition since its inception in 1897; and, having competed in every season, it was also the 119th season contested by the Carlton Football Club. Carlton's primary home ground for games was the Melbourne Cricket Ground, with the club hosting six matches at the venue and five at Etihad Stadium – a small change from the previous season, when the club had played six games at Etihad Stadium and five at the Melbourne Cricket Ground. Traditional home ground at Princes Park (which was renamed from Visy Park to Ikon Park from the start of the year under a two-year naming rights deal with Ikon Services Australia) continued to serve as the training and administrative base. Carlton continued its alignment with the Northern Blues in the Victorian Football League, allowing Carlton-listed players to play with the Northern Blues when not selected in AFL matches.

Following an online vote of members, the club changed the font of the CFC monogram on the front of its playing guernsey. The new monogram, more traditional in style, featured block-style letters and no gaps at the intersections between letters; it matched the design which had been used between 1927 and 1997, and which had thrice been worn as a heritage guernsey during the 2014 season.

The club's membership for the 2015 season was 47,305, a 0.4% reduction from the 2014 membership of 47,485; it was Carlton's second consecutive reduction in membership, and the club was one of only three clubs to suffer a drop in membership in the 2015 season. The club made a net operating loss of $2,700,000 for the season.

== Senior Personnel ==
Mark LoGiudice continued as club president, a role he has held since June 2014. Mick Malthouse began the season as senior coach, with his coaching panel unchanged from 2014; following Malthouse’s dismissal on 26 May, backline assistant coach John Barker stepped in as caretaker.

Marc Murphy continued into his third season as club captain, as part of a five-man leadership group, a reduction from the seven-man group which led the team in 2014. Bryce Gibbs, Lachlan Henderson and Michael Jamison remained in the group from 2014 – Gibbs and Jamison were named vice-captains – and Sam Rowe was elevated to the group. Leaving the group were Andrew Carrazzo and Kade Simpson, who both stepped down from the group after serving in it for many years, and Brock McLean, who was delisted.

== Squad for 2015 ==
Flags represent the state of origin, i.e. the state in which the player played his Under-18s football.

Senior List
No.	State	Player	Age	AFL Debut	Recruited from	Career (to end 2014)		2015 Player Statistics
No.	State	Player	Age	AFL Debut	Recruited from	Gms	Gls	Gms	Gls	B	D	K	HB	M	T	HO
1	(Victoria (state))	Andrew Walker	28	2004	Bendigo (U18)	179	118	12	12	6	163	106	57	48	22	1
2	(South Australia)	Troy Menzel	20	2013	Central District	26	34	14	13	7	130	87	43	46	24	–
3	(Victoria (state))	Marc Murphy (c)	27	2006	Oakleigh (U18)	185	143	19	7	6	510	291	219	79	65	1
4	(South Australia)	Bryce Gibbs (vc)	25	2007	Glenelg	177	98	10	4	5	209	112	97	21	54	7
5	(Victoria (state))	Chris Judd	31	2002	Sandringham (U18), West Coast	271	224	8	4	2	148	76	72	20	21	–
6	(Victoria (state))	Kade Simpson	30	2003	Eastern (U18)	222	121	20	3	1	460	285	175	118	42	1
7	(Victoria (state))	Dylan Buckley	21	2013	Northern (U18)	8	2	18	5	5	258	152	106	65	38	–
8	(Victoria (state))	Matthew Kreuzer	25	2008	Northern (U18)	106	56	13	9	5	166	91	75	40	55	276
9	(Western Australia)	Patrick Cripps	19	2014	East Fremantle	3	–	20	6	13	471	158	313	64	98	39
10	(Victoria (state))	Matthew Watson	22	2011	Calder (U18)	19	6	4	4	2	32	23	9	18	8	1
11	(Victoria (state))	Robert Warnock	27	2007	Sandringham (U18), Fremantle	86	17	2	–	–	18	8	10	1	3	56
12	(Western Australia)	Blaine Boekhorst	21	2015	Swan Districts	–	–	11	5	9	138	76	62	24	26	–
13	(Western Australia)	Chris Yarran	24	2009	Swan Districts	105	87	14	3	2	223	182	41	68	33	–
14	(Tasmania)	Liam Jones	23	2010	North Hobart, Western Bulldogs	66	68	9	7	9	65	46	19	31	18	–
15	(Victoria (state))	Sam Docherty	21	2013	Gippsland (U18), Brisbane Lions	29	8	19	2	2	401	260	141	116	40	1
16	(Victoria (state))	Dillon Viojo-Rainbow	18	–	Western (U18)	–	–	–	–	–	–	–	–	–	–	–
17	(New South Wales)	Sam Rowe (lg)	27	2013	Murray (U18), Sydney, Norwood	31	11	20	2	–	211	125	86	79	43	28
18	(Victoria (state))	Kristian Jaksch	20	2013	Oakleigh (U18), GWS	7	2	6	1	2	62	39	23	26	8	–
19	(South Australia)	Cameron Giles	19	–	Woodville-West Torrens	–	–	–	–	–	–	–	–	–	–	–
20	(Victoria (state))	Nick Holman	19	2014	Murray (U18)	1	–	8	–	–	75	31	44	15	31	–
22		Jason Tutt	23	2011	Ainslie, Western Bulldogs	26	22	13	4	5	218	128	90	55	35	–
23	(Victoria (state))	Lachlan Henderson (lg)	26	2007	Geelong (U18), Brisbane	101	88	16	16	10	189	134	55	96	24	2
24	(New South Wales)	Mark Whiley	22	2012	Murray (U18), GWS	12	2	8	1	2	95	46	49	17	33	19
25	(Western Australia)	Clem Smith	18	2015	Perth	–	–	7	–	–	55	24	31	11	9	–
26	(Victoria (state))	Jayden Foster	19	–	Calder (U18)	–	–	–	–	–	–	–	–	–	–	–
27	(Western Australia)	Dennis Armfield	28	2008	Swan Districts	113	44	12	13	10	145	88	57	25	36	–
28	(Queensland)	Tom Bell	23	2012	Morningside	29	19	22	17	14	465	295	170	97	87	16
31	(Victoria (state))	Matthew Dick	20	2015	Calder (U18), Sydney	–	–	6	–	2	70	40	30	20	12	–
32	(Victoria (state))	Nicholas Graham	20	2013	Gippsland (U18)	10	2	6	3	1	104	51	53	15	29	–
33	(Victoria (state))	Andrejs Everitt	25	2007	Dandenong (U18), Western Bulldogs, Sydney	96	45	22	31	20	334	225	109	132	30	16
35	(Victoria (state))	Ed Curnow	25	2011	Geelong (U18), Adelaide, Box Hill	66	11	22	–	3	478	216	262	75	98	–
39	(Victoria (state))	Dale Thomas	27	2006	Gippsland (U18), Collingwood	177	133	5	2	2	70	42	28	20	6	–
40	(Victoria (state))	Michael Jamison (vc)	28	2007	North Ballarat (U18, VFL)	131	2	14	–	–	132	74	58	56	15	3
41	(Victoria (state))	Levi Casboult	24	2012	Dandenong (U18)	36	29	16	24	12	150	100	50	83	15	86
42	(Republic of Ireland)	Zach Tuohy	25	2011	Laois GAA	76	25	22	9	3	414	239	175	107	24	–
43	(Western Australia)	Simon White	26	2010	Subiaco	45	9	14	1	1	156	93	63	42	26	7
44	(Victoria (state))	Andrew Carrazzo	31	2004	Oakleigh (U18), Geelong	178	47	16	1	3	365	128	237	40	63	–
46	(Western Australia)	David Ellard	25	2008	Swan Districts	53	33	10	4	3	102	55	47	24	32	–
Rookie List
No.	State	Player	Age	AFL Debut	Recruited from	Career (to end 2014)		2015 Player Statistics
No.	State	Player	Age	AFL Debut	Recruited from	Gms	Gls	Gms	Gls	B	D	K	HB	M	T	HO
21	(Republic of Ireland)	Ciarán Sheehan	24	2014	Cork GAA	4	–	–	–	–	–	–	–	–	–	–
29	(Victoria (state))	Billy Gowers	18	–	Oakleigh (U18)	–	–	–	–	–	–	–	–	–	–	–
30	(Western Australia)	Blaine Johnson	19	2014	South Fremantle	5	1	2	–	1	15	5	10	3	5	–
34	(Western Australia)	Brad Walsh	18	2015	Peel Thunder	–	–	3	1	–	19	6	13	2	5	–
36	(South Australia)	Cameron Wood	27	2005	West Adelaide, Brisbane Lions, Collingwood, Williamstown	70	23	18	5	3	108	108	72	33	34	319
37	(Queensland)	Tom Fields	22	2015	Labrador, South Adelaide	–	–	2	–	–	21	16	5	5	8	–
38	(Republic of Ireland)	Ciarán Byrne	20	2015	Louth GAA	–	–	1	–	–	9	5	4	1	1	–
47	(Victoria (state))	Fraser Russell	22	–	Geelong (U18), Deakin (athletics)	–	–	–	–	–	–	–	–	–	–	–
Senior coaching panel
	State	Coach	Coaching position				Carlton Coaching debut		Former clubs as coach
	(Victoria (state))	Mick Malthouse	Senior Coach (Rounds 1–8)				2013		Footscray (s), West Coast (s), Collingwood (s)
	(Victoria (state))	John Barker	Assistant coach (Back-line); Caretaker coach (Rounds 9–23)				2011		St Kilda (a), Hawthorn (a)
	(Western Australia)	Robert Wiley	Director of Coaching and Development				2013		Perth (s), West Coast (a), Western Australia U16s (s)
	(Western Australia)	Dean Laidley	Assistant coach (Midfield)				2014		Collingwood (a), North Melbourne (s), Port Adelaide (a), St Kilda (a)
	(Tasmania)	Brad Green	Assistant coach (Forward-line)				2013
	(Victoria (state))	Matthew Capuano	Development coach				2009
	(Queensland)	Michael Osborne	Development coach				2013
	(Victoria (state))	Luke Webster	Development coach, Northern Blues senior coach				2011

- For players: (c) denotes captain, (vc) denotes vice-captain, (dvc) denotes deputy vice-captain, (lg) denotes leadership group.
- For coaches: (s) denotes senior coach, (cs) denotes caretaker senior coach, (a) denotes assistant coach, (d) denotes development coach.

== Playing list changes ==
The following summarises all player changes between the conclusion of the 2014 season and the conclusion of the 2015 season.

=== In ===
Player	Previous club	League	via
(Victoria (state)) Fraser Russell	Deakin Athletic Club	Athletics Victoria	Signed as a Category B rookie late in the 2014 season; as a formality, he was drafted in the AFL Rookie Draft, fourth round (No. 58 overall)
(Victoria (state)) Kristian Jaksch	Greater Western Sydney	AFL	AFL Trade Period, with Mark Whiley and a second-round draft pick (No. 19 overall), in exchange for a first-round draft pick (No. 7 overall)
(New South Wales) Mark Whiley	Greater Western Sydney	AFL	AFL Trade Period, with Kristian Jaksch and a second-round draft pick (No. 19 overall), in exchange for a first-round draft pick (No. 7 overall)
(Tasmania) Liam Jones	Western Bulldogs	AFL	AFL Trade Period, in exchange for a third-round draft pick (No. 46 overall)
(Victoria (state)) Matthew Dick	Sydney	AFL	Signed as a delisted free agent
(Western Australia) Blaine Boekhorst	Swan Districts	WAFL	AFL National Draft, first round (No. 19 overall)
(Victoria (state)) Dillon Viojo-Rainbow	Western (U18)	TAC Cup	AFL National Draft, second round (No. 28 overall)
(Western Australia) Clem Smith	Perth	WAFL	AFL National Draft, fourth round (No. 60 overall)
(Victoria (state)) Jayden Foster	Calder (U18)	TAC Cup	AFL National Draft, fourth round (No. 63 overall)
Jason Tutt	Western Bulldogs	AFL	AFL Pre-season Draft, first round (No. 2 overall)
(Victoria (state)) Billy Gowers	Oakleigh (U18)	TAC Cup	AFL Rookie Draft, first round (No. 6 overall)
(Western Australia) Brad Walsh	Peel Thunder	WAFL	AFL Rookie Draft, second round (No. 24 overall)
(Queensland) Tom Fields	South Adelaide	SANFL	AFL Rookie Draft, third round (No. 41 overall)

=== Out ===
Player	New Club	League	via
(South Australia) Nick Duigan	Towns	Greater Northern FL	Removed from the list following his retirement in December 2013
(Victoria (state)) Heath Scotland	Doncaster	Eastern FL	Removed from the list following his retirement in May 2014
(Western Australia) Josh Bootsma	Peel Thunder	WAFL	Removed from the list following his sacking in June 2014
(Victoria (state)) Andrew McInnes	Norwood	SANFL	Delisted after the season
(Victoria (state)) Tom Temay			Delisted after the season
(Victoria (state)) Jaryd Cachia	Richmond reserves	VFL	Delisted from the rookie list after the season
(South Australia) Luke Reynolds	Port Adelaide reserves	SANFL	Delisted from the rookie list after the season
(Victoria (state)) Jarrad Waite	North Melbourne	AFL	Signed as an unrestricted free agent
(Western Australia) Jeff Garlett	Melbourne	AFL	AFL Trade Period, with a fifth-round draft pick (No. 83 overall), in exchange for fourth-round and a higher fifth-round draft pick (No. 61 and 79 overall)
(Western Australia) Kane Lucas	West Coast	AFL	Delisted after the Trade Period; later recruited by West Coast in the rookie draft.
(Victoria (state)) Brock McLean	Aberfeldie	EDFL	Delisted after the Trade Period
(Tasmania) Mitch Robinson	Brisbane Lions	AFL	Delisted after the Trade Period; signed by Brisbane Lions as a free agent

=== List management ===
Player	Change
National draft	Carlton received no free agency compensation draft picks, as the loss of Jarrad Waite was not deemed sufficient to justify one
Jason Tutt	Resigned from the Western Bulldogs on 7 November and received permission to train with Carlton.
Guernsey number changes	Patrick Cripps (No. 16 to No. 9); Ciarán Sheehan (No. 47 to No. 21); Blaine Johnson (No. 45 to No. 30); Ciarán Byrne (No. 48 to No. 38)
(Victoria (state)) Chris Judd	Judd retired from playing on 9 June 2015, following an anterior cruciate ligament injury suffered in Round 10.

== Season summary ==
=== Pre-season matches ===
The club's three scheduled pre-season matches were played as part of the 2015 NAB Challenge series.

**Rd**	**Date and local time**	**Opponent**	**Scores** (Carlton's scores indicated in **bold**)			**Venue**	**Attendance**
**Rd**	**Date and local time**	**Opponent**	Home	Away	Result	**Venue**	**Attendance**
1	Friday, 27 February (4:10 pm)	West Coast	1.9.15 (78)	**2.4.5 (47)**	Lost by 31 points	Rushton Park, Mandurah (A)	10,000 (approx.)
2	Sunday, 15 March (4:40 pm)	Collingwood	1.7.13 (64)	**1.9.8 (71)**	Won by 7 points	Queen Elizabeth Oval, Bendigo (A)	9,542
3	Sunday, 22 March (4:10 pm)	Geelong	**2.10.14 (92)**	0.17.9 (111)	Lost by 19 points	Docklands Stadium (H)	10,631

=== Home and away season ===
Carlton performed very poorly in the early part of the home-and-away season. The club fell to last place after Round 7, won one of its first eight games – against defending wooden spooner St Kilda in Round 4 – and lost four games by more than ten goals. The turndown in form placed significant pressure on Carlton's off-field organisation. The club had engaged in optimistic preseason marketing, which included Mick Malthouse telling the media that "it’s very, very difficult to see where we’re going to lose a game"; but after only the second round, a 69-point loss against West Coast, Steven Trigg and Mark LoGiudice publicly declared that the club was in a phase of rebuilding. The following weeks were characterised by poor performances and low crowds, which resulted in speculation about Malthouse's coaching future with the club. Early in the season, LoGiudice guaranteed that Malthouse would retain his job until the end of the season, but on May 25, he announced a revised position that Malthouse's tenure would be reviewed during the Round 11 bye week. The following morning, Malthouse gave an interview on SEN 1116 in which he was openly critical of the club's administration: he blamed the club's poor performances in part on the psychological effect of Trigg's and LoGiudice's talk of rebuilding; he said he believed LoGiudice's administration had never intended to retain him as coach even before the season began; and he made allegations that Adelaide, during Carlton CEO Steven Trigg's tenure there, had illegally signed a contract with Eddie Betts eighteen months before he became an eligible free agent (Betts had transferred from Carlton to Adelaide at the end of 2013 as a restricted free agent, and the AFL dismissed Malthouse's allegations). Consequently, Malthouse was dismissed that afternoon.

Backline assistant coach John Barker was installed as caretaker coach for the remainder of the season. The club's performances improved over the following six weeks, with two wins and two close losses, but the end of the season was little better than the start, and Carlton won only one of its last ten matches, finishing last on percentage. It was Carlton's first last place finish since 2006, and the fourth in the club's VFL/AFL history.

Across the season, Carlton had a record of 3–3 in six matches against other clubs in the bottom six, all of whom won seven or fewer games for the season. Against all other clubs, Carlton's record was 1–15, the sole win coming against 9th-placed Port Adelaide.

**Rd**	**Date and local time**	**Opponent**	**Scores** (Carlton's scores indicated in **bold**)			**Venue**	**Attendance**	**Ladder** **position**
**Rd**	**Date and local time**	**Opponent**	Home	Away	Result	**Venue**	**Attendance**	**Ladder** **position**
1	Thursday, 2 April (7:20 pm)	Richmond	**11.12 (78)**	15.15 (105)	Lost by 27 points	Melbourne Cricket Ground (H)	83,493	16th
2	Friday, 10 April (6:10 pm)	West Coast	20.11 (131)	**9.8 (62)**	Lost by 69 points	Domain Stadium (A)	34,588	16th
3	Saturday, 18 April (1:45 pm)	Essendon	**11.18 (84)**	16.9 (105)	Lost by 21 points	Melbourne Cricket Ground (H)	54,854	17th
4	Saturday, 25 April (1:10 pm)	St Kilda	12.9 (81)	**18.13 (121)**	Won by 40 points	Westpac Stadium, Wellington (A)	12,125	14th
5	Friday, 1 May (7:50 pm)	Collingwood	**6.9 (45)**	18.12 (120)	Lost by 75 points	Melbourne Cricket Ground (H)	71,759	17th
6	Sunday, 10 May (3:20 pm)	Brisbane Lions	**11.9 (75)**	12.12 (84)	Lost by 9 points	Etihad Stadium (H)	20,273	17th
7	Saturday, 16 May (4:35 pm)	GWS	**9.3 (57)**	19.21 (135)	Lost by 78 points	Etihad Stadium (H)	16,676	18th
8	Friday, 22 May (7:50 pm)	Geelong	22.8 (140)	**9.9 (63)**	Lost by 77 points	Etihad Stadium (A)	32,032	18th
9	Friday, 29 May (7:50 pm)	Sydney	19.8 (122)	**9.8 (62)**	Lost by 60 points	Sydney Cricket Ground (A)	32,105	18th
10	Saturday, 6 June (1:40 pm)	Adelaide	**14.6 (90)**	14.15 (99)	Lost by 9 points	Melbourne Cricket Ground (H)	32,035	17th
11	Bye							18th
12	Saturday, 20 June (1:40 pm)	Port Adelaide	**17.8 (110)**	16.10 (106)	Won by 4 points	Melbourne Cricket Ground (H)	27,693	16th
13	Sunday, 28 June (3:20 pm)	Gold Coast	**14.19 (103)**	9.15 (69)	Won by 34 points	Etihad Stadium (H)	30,207	16th
14	Saturday, 4 July (7:30 pm)	Western Bulldogs	9.10 (64)	**7.11 (53)**	Lost by 11 points	Etihad Stadium (A)	31,445	16th
15	Friday, 10 July (7:50 pm)	Richmond	10.11 (71)	**5.11 (41)**	Lost by 30 points	Melbourne Cricket Ground (A)	52,564	16th
16	Saturday, 18 July (5:40 pm)	Fremantle	13.17 (95)	**8.5 (53)**	Lost by 42 points	Domain Stadium (A)	33,581	16th
17	Friday, 24 July (7:50 pm)	Hawthorn	**4.11 (35)**	27.11 (173)	Lost by 138 points	Etihad Stadium (H)	26,815	16th
18	Saturday, 1 August (7:20 pm)	North Melbourne	**8.6 (54)**	18.10 (118)	Lost by 64 points	Etihad Stadium (H)	25,251	16th
19	Saturday, 8 August (1:45 pm)	Collingwood	16.9 (105)	**13.9 (87)**	Lost by 18 points	Melbourne Cricket Ground (A)	48,133	17th
20	Saturday, 15 August (7:20 pm)	Brisbane Lions	20.11 (131)	**9.13 (67)**	Lost by 64 points	Gabba (A)	17,744	18th
21	Sunday, 23 August (3:20 pm)	Melbourne	**12.6 (78)**	7.13 (55)	Won by 23 points	Melbourne Cricket Ground (H)	33,962	17th
22	Saturday, 29 August (1:45 pm)	GWS	**20.12 (132)**	7.9 (51)	Lost by 81 points	Spotless Stadium (A)	9,538	17th
23	Saturday, 5 September (4:40 pm)	Hawthorn	17.11 (113)	**8.8 (56)**	Lost by 57 points	Melbourne Cricket Ground (A)	33,182	18th

== Ladder ==
Pos	Team	Pld	W	L	D	PF	PA	PP	Pts	Qualification
1	Fremantle	22	17	5	0	1857	1564	118.7	68	Finals series
2	West Coast	22	16	5	1	2330	1572	148.2	66	Finals series
3	Hawthorn (P)	22	16	6	0	2452	1548	158.4	64	Finals series
4	Sydney	22	16	6	0	2006	1578	127.1	64	Finals series
5	Richmond	22	15	7	0	1930	1568	123.1	60	Finals series
6	Western Bulldogs	22	14	8	0	2101	1825	115.1	56	Finals series
7	Adelaide	21	13	8	0	2107	1821	115.7	54 (Note: The round 14 match between Adelaide and Geelong was cancelled due to the death of Adelaide coach Phil Walsh, and both teams were awarded two premiership points each.)	Finals series
8	North Melbourne	22	13	9	0	2062	1937	106.5	52	Finals series
9	Port Adelaide	22	12	10	0	2002	1874	106.8	48	
10	Geelong	21	11	9	1	1853	1833	101.1	48	
11	Greater Western Sydney	22	11	11	0	1872	1891	99.0	44	
12	Collingwood	22	10	12	0	1972	1856	106.3	40	
13	Melbourne	22	7	15	0	1573	2044	77.0	28	
14	St Kilda	22	6	15	1	1695	2162	78.4	26	
15	Essendon	22	6	16	0	1580	2134	74.0	24	
16	Gold Coast	22	4	17	1	1633	2240	72.9	18	
17	Brisbane Lions	22	4	18	0	1557	2306	67.5	16	
18	Carlton	22	4	18	0	1525	2354	64.8	16	

Rules for classification: 1) points; 2) percentage; 3) number of points for.
(P) Premiers

== Team awards and records ==
Match records

- Rounds 6–9 – Carlton recorded 13 consecutive losing quarters, starting with the third quarter in Round 6 and ending with the third quarter in Round 9; it set a new record as the longest such streak in the club's history.
- Round 7 – Greater Western Sydney's score of 19.21 (135) and winning margin of 78 points against Carlton both set new records for the highest in GWS's history.
- Round 14 – Western Bulldogs's score of 9.10 (64) was the lowest winning score by any team against Carlton since Round 19, 2002.
- Round 17 – Carlton's 138-point losing margin against Hawthorn was the heaviest defeat in the club's history.
- Round 17 – Carlton's score of 4.11 (35) against Hawthorn was its lowest in any match since Round 8, 2006.
- Round 22 – For the second time in the season, Greater Western Sydney's winning margin of 81 points against Carlton set a new record for the highest in GWS's history.

Other

- Round 4 – Carlton won the 2015 Simpson-Henderson Trophy with its 40-point win over St Kilda. The trophy was awarded to the team which won St Kilda's then-annual Anzac Day home match in Wellington.

== Individual awards and records ==
=== John Nicholls Medal ===
The Carlton Football Club Best and Fairest awards night took place on 17 September. The John Nicholls Medal, for the best and fairest player of the club, as well as several other awards, were presented on the night.

John Nicholls Medal

The winner of the John Nicholls Medal was Patrick Cripps, who polled 68 votes to narrowly beat captain Marc Murphy (67 votes) and Zach Tuohy (64 votes). It was Cripps' first John Nicholls Medal in only his second season, having played only three senior games before the start of the season. At age 20 years 6 months, Cripps was the second-youngest winner of the Carlton best and fairest behind only John Nicholls who won aged 20 years 1 month in 1959.

Pos.	Player	Votes
1st	Patrick Cripps	68
2nd	Marc Murphy	67
3rd	Zach Tuohy	64
4th	Tom Bell	57
4th	Ed Curnow	57
6th	Sam Docherty	48
7th	Kade Simpson	45
8th	Andrejs Everitt	37
9th	Simon White	35
10th	Andrew Carrazzo	23

Other awards

The following other awards were presented on John Nicholls Medal night:-

- Best First-Year Player – Blaine Boekhorst
- Best Clubman – Simon White
- Women of Carlton Player Ambassador – Kade Simpson
- Spirit of Carlton Award – Ed Curnow
- Inner Blue Ruthless Award – Patrick Cripps
- Carltonians Achievement Award – Tom Bell
- Blues Coterie Most Improved Player – Tom Bell
- Hyundai MVP Award (the most valuable player as voted by fans in an online poll) – Patrick Cripps

=== Leading Goalkickers ===
Andrejs Everitt was Carlton's leading goalkicker for the season, with 31 goals. It was the first and only time Everitt won Carlton's goalkicking.

Player	Goals	Behinds
Andrejs Everitt	31	20
Levi Casboult	24	12
Tom Bell	17	14
Lachlan Henderson	16	10
Dennis Armfield	13	10

=== Other awards ===
NAB AFL Rising Star

Patrick Cripps was nominated for 2015 NAB AFL Rising Star award after his Round 4 performance against St Kilda. He was the favourite to win the award, but was ultimately voted to second place.

Honorific teams

- Patrick Cripps was named as the centreman in the 2015 22 Under 22 team, made up of players aged 22 or less on Grand Final Day. Sam Docherty was named in the 47-man squad but was not selected for the final team.
- Zach Tuohy was named as the small defender in the 2015 AFL Coaches Association All-Australian team, by virtue of polling the most votes of any small defender in the AFL Coaches Association MVP award.

Miscellaneous

- Dennis Armfield won the Jim Stynes Community Leadership Award, which was awarded at the Brownlow Medal Count, in recognition of his work with the Odyssey House Drug and Rehabilitation Centre.
- Chris Judd won the Madden Medal for his on-field excellence, personal development and community spirit throughout his career.
- Round 4 – Marc Murphy won the Crowl-McDonald Medal as best on ground in Carlton's Anzac Day game against St Kilda. The newly established medal was named for Claude Crowl (St Kilda) and Fen McDonald (Carlton) on the hundredth anniversary of their deaths in the landing at Anzac Cove.

=== Player and coach records ===
- Round 5 – Mick Malthouse coached his 715th career VFL/AFL game (comprising 132 for Footscray, 218 for West Coast, 264 for Collingwood and 50 for Carlton) to pass the long-standing record of 714 games set by Jock McHale (Collingwood) to become the all-time record holder for VFL/AFL games coached.

== Northern Blues ==
The Carlton Football Club had a full affiliation with the Northern Blues during the 2015 season. It was the thirteenth season of the clubs' affiliation, which had been in place since 2003. Carlton senior- and rookie-listed players who were not selected to play in the Carlton team were eligible to play for either the Northern Blues seniors or reserves team in the Victorian Football League. The club's nine home matches were split three ways, with three matches at the VFL club's traditional home ground Preston City Oval, four matches at Carlton's traditional home ground Ikon Park, and two matches played as curtain-raisers to Carlton AFL matches at Etihad Stadium. The Northern Blues finished 14th out of 15 in the VFL with a record of 4–14. Carlton's Brad Walsh won the Laurie Hill Trophy as Northern's best and fairest.
