= 2011 Collingwood Football Club season =

Collingwood Football Club
2011 season
- President: Eddie Maguire
- Coach: Mick Malthouse (12th season)
- Captains: Nick Maxwell (3rd season)
- Home ground: Melbourne Cricket Ground
- Pre-season competition: Premiers
- Regular season: 1st
- Finals series: Runners Up
- Best and Fairest: Scott Pendlebury
- Leading goalkicker: Travis Cloke (69 goals)
- Highest home attendance: 88,181 (Round 3, vs Carlton)
- Lowest home attendance: 35,773 (Round 1, vs Port Adelaide)
- Average home attendance: 61,488
- Club membership: ≈70,000

The 2011 AFL season was the Collingwood Magpies' 115th season in the Australian Football League.

Despite winning the McClelland Trophy and the 2011 pre-season cup, Collingwood lost the Grand Final to premiers Geelong. Additionally, all three games Collingwood lost during the 2011 season were against Geelong.

Collingwood played 22 home and away matches across 24 rounds, with byes in Rounds 7 and 13. The club played Carlton, Essendon, Geelong, North Melbourne, Port Adelaide and St Kilda twice and all other teams once throughout the home and away season. The Magpies travelled only four times during the season; one each to Western Australia (to play Fremantle), South Australia (to play Port Adelaide again), New South Wales (to play Sydney) and Queensland (to play Gold Coast). Their matches against inter-state teams West Coast, Adelaide and the Brisbane Lions were played at the MCG.

== Squad ==
Players are listed by guernsey number, and 2011 statistics are for AFL regular season and finals series matches during the 2011 AFL season only. Career statistics include a player's complete AFL career, which, as a result, means that a player's debut and part or whole of their career statistics may be for another club. Statistics are correct as of the 2011 Grand Final (1 October 2011) and are taken from AFL Tables.

No.	Name	AFL debut	Games (2012)	Goals (2012)	Games (CFC)	Goals (CFC)	Games (AFL career)	Goals (AFL career)
1	Leon Davis	2000	21	7	225	270	225	270
2	Chris Tarrant	1998	23	2	184	301	256	361
3	John McCarthy	2008	8	6	18	10	18	10
4	Alan Didak	2001	20	9	202	260	202	260
5	Nick Maxwell (c)	2004	19	0	159	26	159	26
6	Tyson Goldsack	2007	13	1	69	7	69	7
7	Andrew Krakouer	2001 (Richmond)	23	35	23	35	125	137
8	Harry O'Brien	2005	24	1	135	15	135	15
10	Scott Pendlebury (vc)	2006	25	24	127	87	127	87
11	Jarryd Blair	2010	24	26	36	33	36	33
12	Luke Ball	2003 (St Kilda)	24	18	48	25	190	83
13	Dale Thomas	2006	21	13	132	99	132	99
14	Luke Rounds	2011	5	1	5	1	5	1
15	Leigh Brown	2000 (Fremantle)	23	23	65	54	246	138
16	Nathan Brown	2008	0	0	50	6	50	6
17	Dayne Beams	2009	16	21	59	61	59	61
18	Darren Jolly	2001 (Melbourne)	16	12	42	36	208	106
19	Cameron Wood	2005 (Brisbane Lions)	12	5	42	18	58	18
20	Ben Reid	2007	24	1	53	4	53	4
21	Sharrod Wellingham	2008	20	17	72	42	72	42
22	Steele Sidebottom	2009	25	25	61	52	61	52
23	Lachlan Keeffe	2011	5	4	5	4	5	4
24	Josh Thomas	****	0	0	0	0	0	0
25	Tom Young	2011	2	2	2	2	2	2
26	Ben Johnson	2000	16	7	224	69	224	69
27	Simon Buckley	2007 (Melbourne)	13	5	13	5	34	8
28	Ben Sinclair	2011	4	2	4	2	4	2
29	Jonathon Ceglar	****	0	0	0	0	0	0
30	Brent Macaffer	2009	4	1	30	21	30	21
31	Chris Dawes	2008	18	27	48	67	48	67
32	Travis Cloke	2005	25	69	149	224	149	224
33	Brad Dick	2007	3	1	27	32	27	32
34	Alan Toovey	2007	20	0	87	8	87	8
35	Alex Fasolo	2011	13	16	13	16	13	16
36	Dane Swan	2003	24	32	175	133	175	133
37	Kirk Ugle	****	0	0	0	0	0	0
39	Heath Shaw	2005	17	2	132	27	132	27
40	Paul Seedsman	****	0	0	0	0	0	0
41	Daniel Farmer	****	0	0	0	0	0	0
43	Trent Stubbs	****	0	0	0	0	0	0
44	Tom Gordon	****	0	0	0	0	0	0
45	Tom Hunter	****	0	0	0	0	0	0
46	Declan Reilly	****	0	0	0	0	0	0
47	Jack Perham	****	0	0	0	0	0	0
48	Jye Bolton	****	0	0	0	0	0	0
49	Paul Cribbin	****	0	0	0	0	0	0
50	Shae McNamara	****	0	0	0	0	0	0

== Season summary ==
=== Pre-season ===
**Round**	**Date and local time**	**Opponent**	**Scores** (Collingwood's scores indicated in **bold**)			**Venue**	**Attendance**
**Round**	**Date and local time**	**Opponent**	Home	Away	Result	**Venue**	**Attendance**
**Pool matches**
1	Saturday, 12 February (8:20 pm)	Richmond	0.1.1 (7)	**0.7.8 (50)**	Won by 43 points	Etihad Stadium	40,300 (approx.)
1	Saturday, 12 February (9:25 pm)	Carlton	0.3.8 (26)	**0.5.3 (33)**	Won by 11 points	Etihad Stadium	40,300 (approx.)
**Finals**
QF	Friday, 25 February (7:40 pm)	Sydney	**1.12.12 (93)**	1.10.10 (79)	Won by 14 points	Etihad Stadium	10,773
SF	Saturday, 5 March (5:40 pm)	West Coast	0.8.8 (56)	**1.9.17 (80)**	Won by 24 points	Patersons Stadium	15,360
GF	Friday, 11 March (7:45 pm)	Essendon	0.13.8 (86)	**1.15.9 (108)**	Won by 22 points	Etihad Stadium	45,304
**NAB Cup Premiers**

=== Regular season ===
**Round**	**Date and local time**	**Opponent**	**Scores** (Collingwood's scores indicated in **bold**)			**Venue**	**Attendance**	**Ladder** **position**
**Round**	**Date and local time**	**Opponent**	Home	Away	Result	**Venue**	**Attendance**	**Ladder** **position**
1	Saturday, 26 March (2:10 pm)	Port Adelaide	**24.11 (155)**	12.8 (80)	Won by 75 points Report	Etihad Stadium **[H]**	35,773	2nd
2	Saturday, 2 April (2:10 pm)	North Melbourne	7.14 (56)	**21.17 (143)**	Won by 87 points Report	Etihad Stadium **[A]**	40,578	1st
3	Friday, 8 April (7:40 pm)	Carlton	**15.12 (102)**	11.8 (74)	Won by 28 points Report	MCG **[H]**	88,181	1st
4	Friday, 15 April (7:40 pm)	Richmond	13.12 (90)	**24.17 (161)**	Won by 71 points Report	MCG **[A]**	58,050	1st
5	Monday, 25 April (2:40 pm)	Essendon	11.11 (77)	**16.11 (107)**	Won by 30 points Report	MCG **[A]**	89,626	1st
6	Sunday, 1 May (4:40 pm)	Western Bulldogs	**15.15 (105)**	8.9 (57)	Won by 48 points Report	MCG **[H]**	53,776	1st
7	Bye							1st
8	Friday, 13 May (7:40 pm)	Geelong	8.17 (65)	**9.8 (62)**	Lost by 3 points Report	MCG **[A]**	81,691	2nd
9	Sunday, 22 May (1:10 pm)	Adelaide	**20.15 (135)**	14.8 (92)	Won by 43 points Report	Etihad Stadium **[H]**	38,489	2nd
10	Sunday, 29 May (2:10 pm)	West Coast	**16.9 (105)**	7.11 (53)	Won by 52 points Report	MCG **[H]**	52,560	2nd
11	Saturday, 4 June (7:10 pm)	St Kilda	**16.12 (108)**	7.9 (51)	Won by 57 points Report	MCG **[H]**	62,991	2nd
12	Monday, 13 June (2:10 pm)	Melbourne	6.5 (41)	**19.15 (129)**	Won by 88 points Report	MCG **[A]**	75,998	2nd
13	Bye							2nd
14	Saturday, 25 June (7:10 pm)	Sydney	14.9 (93)	**13.21 (99)**	Won by 6 points Report	ANZ Stadium **[A]**	38,053	2nd
15	Sunday, 3 July (2:10 pm)	Hawthorn	**15.16 (106)**	9.11 (65)	Won by 41 points Report	MCG **[H]**	83,985	2nd
16	Sunday, 10 July (1:10 pm)	North Melbourne	**22.15 (147)**	3.12 (30)	Won by 117 points Report	MCG **[H]**	53,601	1st
17	Saturday, 16 July (2:10 pm)	Carlton	11.13 (79)	**13.20 (98)**	Won by 19 points Report	MCG **[A]**	85,936	1st
18	Saturday, 23 July (7:10 pm)	Gold Coast	11.9 (75)	**19.15 (129)**	Won by 54 points Report	Metricon Stadium **[A]**	23,302	1st
19	Sunday, 31 July (7:40 pm)	Essendon	**25.16 (166)**	14.8 (92)	Won by 74 points Report	MCG **[H]**	73,163	1st
20	Saturday, 6 August (7:10 pm)	Port Adelaide	3.3 (21)	**23.21 (159)**	Won by 138 points Report	AAMI Stadium **[A]**	21,863	1st
21	Friday, 12 August (7:40 pm)	St Kilda	10.10 (70)	**14.5 (89)**	Won by 19 points Report	Etihad Stadium **[A]**	46,505	1st
22	Saturday, 20 August (7:10 pm)	Brisbane Lions	**14.18 (102)**	13.6 (84)	Won by 18 points Report	MCG **[H]**	47,788	1st
23	Friday, 26 August (6:40 pm)	Fremantle	8.4 (52)	**20.12 (132)**	Won by 80 points Report	Patersons Stadium **[A]**	31,985	1st
24	Friday, 2 September (7:40 pm)	Geelong	**8.5 (53)**	22.17 (149)	Lost by 96 points	MCG **[H]**	85,705	1st

=== Finals ===
**Round**	**Date and local time**	**Opponent**	**Scores** (Collingwood's scores indicated in **bold**)			**Venue**	**Attendance**
**Round**	**Date and local time**	**Opponent**	Home	Away	Result	**Venue**	**Attendance**
1QF	Saturday, 10 September (2:30 pm)	West Coast	**12.10 (82)**	9.8 (62)	Won by 20 points	MCG **[H]**	67,679
Progressed directly to preliminary final week
1PF	Friday, 23 September (7:45 pm)	Hawthorn	**10.8 (68)**	9.11 (65)	Won by 3 points	MCG **[H]**	87,112
GF	Saturday, 1 October (2:30 pm)	Geelong	**12.9 (81)**	18.11 (119)	Lost by 38 points	MCG **[H]**	99,537

- H Home match.
- A Away match.

== Ladder ==
2011 AFL ladder
Pos	Team	Pld	W	L	D	PF	PA	PP	Pts	
1	Collingwood	22	20	2	0	2592	1546	167.7	80	Finals series
2	Geelong (P)	22	19	3	0	2548	1619	157.4	76	Finals series
3	Hawthorn	22	18	4	0	2355	1634	144.1	72	Finals series
4	West Coast	22	17	5	0	2235	1715	130.3	68	Finals series
5	Carlton	22	14	7	1	2225	1700	130.9	58	Finals series
6	St Kilda	22	12	9	1	1891	1677	112.8	50	Finals series
7	Sydney	22	12	9	1	1897	1735	109.3	50	Finals series
8	Essendon	22	11	10	1	2217	2217	100.0	46	Finals series
9	North Melbourne	22	10	12	0	2106	2082	101.2	40	
10	Western Bulldogs	22	9	13	0	2060	2155	95.6	36	
11	Fremantle	22	9	13	0	1791	2155	83.1	36	
12	Richmond	22	8	13	1	2069	2396	86.4	34	
13	Melbourne	22	8	13	1	1974	2315	85.3	34	
14	Adelaide	22	7	15	0	1742	2193	79.4	28	
15	Brisbane Lions	22	4	18	0	1814	2240	81.0	16	
16	Port Adelaide	22	3	19	0	1718	2663	64.5	12	
17	Gold Coast	22	3	19	0	1534	2726	56.3	12	

Source: AFL ladder
Rules for classification: 1) points; 2) percentage; 3) number of points for.
(P) Premiers
