= Mick Malthouse =

Australian rules footballer (born 1953)

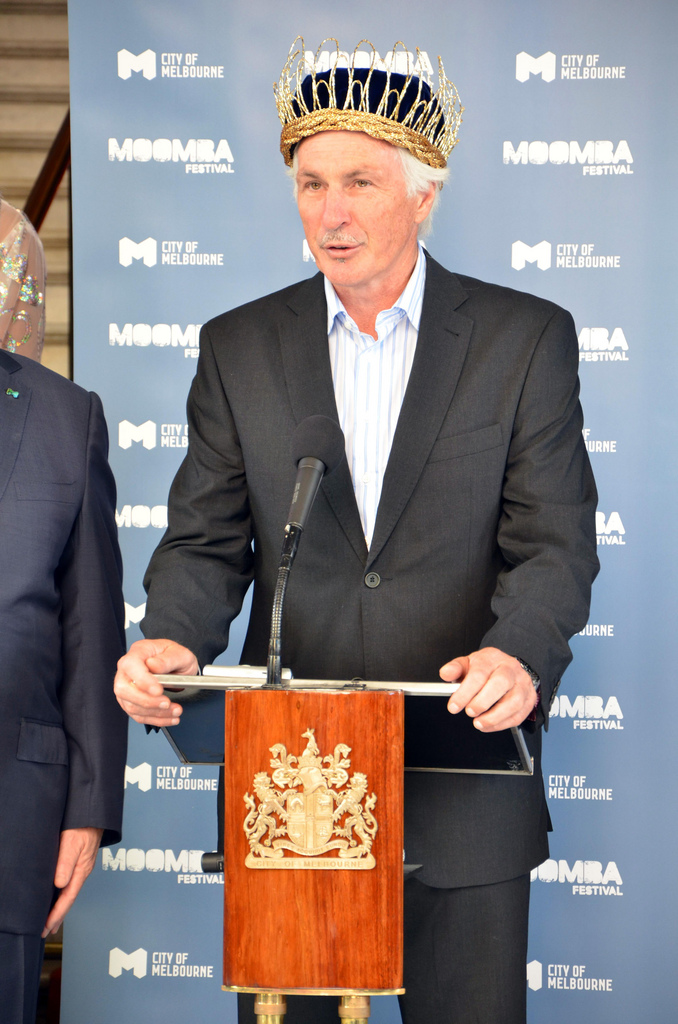
- Malthouse in February 2011

Personal information
- Full name: Michael Raymond Malthouse
- Born: 17 August 1953 (age 73); Ballarat, Victoria
- Original team: North Ballarat
- Height: 180 cm (5 ft 11 in)
- Weight: 76 kg (168 lb)
- Position: Defender

Playing career^{1}
Years	Club	Games (Goals)
1972–1976	St Kilda	53 (5)
1976–1983	Richmond	121 (10)
Total		174 (15)

Coaching career^{3}
Years	Club	Games (W–L–D)
1984–1989	Footscray	135 (67–66–2)
1990–1999	West Coast	243 (156–85–2)
2000–2011	Collingwood	286 (163–121–2)
2013–2015	Carlton	54 (20–33–1)
1991–1993	Representative; Western Australia	3 (1–2–0)
2008–2010	Australia	4 (2–2–0)
Total		725 (409–309–7)
- ^{1} Playing statistics correct to the end of 1983.^{3} Coaching statistics correct as of 2015.

Career highlights
- VFL/AFL Premiership player: (1980); AFL Premiership Coach:(1992, 1994, 2010); 3× Jock McHale Medal: (1992, 1994, 2010); 2× All-Australian coach: (1991, 2010); Australian Football Hall of Fame (2019): 2× Australian International rules coach: (2008, 2010); AFLCA Coach of the Year: (2010)

Michael Raymond Malthouse (born 17 August 1953) is a former Australian rules footballer and coach, who played for the St Kilda Football Club and Richmond Football Club in the Victorian Football League (VFL).

After finishing his playing career, Malthouse embarked on a distinguished coaching career with Footscray, West Coast, Collingwood and Carlton. He guided the Eagles to their first two AFL premierships in 1992 and 1994, and then led Collingwood to their 15th VFL/AFL premiership in 2010. Early in the 2015 AFL season, Malthouse broke the long-standing record held by legendary Collingwood coach Jock McHale for the most VFL/AFL senior games coached, eventually finishing with 718 over 31 seasons.

Since the end of his coaching career, Malthouse has continued his involvement in football through his media commitments, especially with ABC Radio.

== Early years ==
Malthouse was born in Ballarat, Victoria, to Ray Malthouse, a local plasterer, and his wife Marie (née Canty), the year after their marriage. He also has a younger sister, Gerardine.

== Playing career ==
=== St Kilda ===
Recruited from North Ballarat, Malthouse started his football career with St Kilda in 1972, playing 53 senior games including three finals. After being told by then-senior coach Allan Jeans that he would struggle to get a game in the senior side due to a surfeit of similar-skilled players, he departed for Richmond midway through the 1976 season.

=== Richmond ===
At Richmond, Malthouse played 121 senior games, including six finals and the runaway premiership win over Collingwood in the 1980 Grand Final. He was noted for being a tough and solid defender. In 1982 Malthouse managed to play every game of the home-and-away season for the first time in his career, only to suffer a dislocated shoulder in the lead-up to the Grand Final. He missed out on the game after not passing a gruelling fitness test. He retired in 1983.

== Coaching career ==
=== Footscray: 1984–1989 ===
After Ian Hampshire unexpectedly quit as Footscray senior coach in early January, Malthouse decided to return from holiday with his family after hearing about the sudden vacancy on the radio. He was approached by club officials and on 13 January was officially appointed senior coach of Footscray for the next two seasons. Having only recently retired from playing, Malthouse had not been expecting to become a senior VFL coach so soon after, although he had harboured intentions to coach at some level. Nonetheless, he was able to lay out his basic philosophy:

My plans are all orientated on a team game. [...] I'm not looking for individual performances: I'm looking for consistency and at players who can coordinate off and on the field — particularly on the field.

During his time at the Bulldogs he was known for his tough stance on many players, including Doug Hawkins. The team's final standings in his years in charge were 7th (1984), 3rd (1985), 8th (1986), 7th (1987), 8th (1988) and 13th (1989). He impressed with his dedication and professionalism. Malthouse left the financially stricken club at the end of 1989, weeks before it announced its intentions to merge with Fitzroy; the merger never ultimately went ahead due to a supporter fightback, and Malthouse was criticised by his assistant coach Terry Wheeler for not sticking by his club during its time of need. Wheeler then replaced Malthouse as Footscray Football Club senior coach.

=== West Coast Eagles: 1990–1999 ===
Malthouse then replaced John Todd as West Coast Eagles senior coach, at the end of the 1989 season, after Todd was sacked when the Eagles struggled and finished eleventh on the ladder with seven wins and fifteen losses. For ten years from 1990, he was senior coach for the West Coast Eagles. In 1991, the Eagles won their first 12 games of the season and finished minor premiers for the first time in the club's history with 19 wins, one of few teams in VFL/AFL to go through the entire home-and-away season on top of the ladder. They were granted a home Qualifying Final against Hawthorn, marking the first AFL final to be played interstate. In one of the boilovers of the season, Hawthorn weathered the best the Eagles threw at them in the first quarter and eventually ran out winners by 23 points. As a consequence, the Eagles would have to make three consecutive trips to Waverley Park to get to the Grand final. During his tenure as senior coach of the West Coast Eagles, the club under Malthouse made the finals every year, including 1992 and 1994 premierships and 1991 grand finalists as runners-up. Final minor premiership ladder positions were 3rd, 1st, 4th, 6th, 1st, 5th, 4th, 5th, 7th and 5th (1990–1999).

At the end of the 1999 season, Malthouse stepped down as West Coast Eagles senior coach and was replaced by Ken Judge as West Coast Eagles senior coach.

=== Collingwood: 2000–2011 ===
Recruited to the Magpies by Collingwood president Eddie McGuire, Malthouse replaced Tony Shaw as Collingwood senior coach following Shaw's resignation after the club finished last on the ladder (16th), claiming the wooden spoon for the 1999 season. Malthouse coached Collingwood to the finals in eight out of his twelve seasons in charge including grand final appearances in 2002, 2003, 2010 (twice) and 2011.

In Malthouse's first season as Collingwood Football Club senior coach in the 2000 season, Collingwood finished fifteenth (second-last) on the ladder with seven wins and fifteen losses. In the 2001 season, Collingwood under Malthouse just missed out on the finals, where they finished ninth on the ladder with eleven wins and eleven losses.

In the 2002 season, Malthouse guided Collingwood to the 2002 AFL Grand Final but fell short and lost to the Brisbane Lions by a margin of nine points, where the final score was Brisbane Lions 10.15 (75) to Collingwood 9.12 (66).

In the 2003 season, Malthouse again guided Collingwood to the 2003 AFL Grand Final but lost for the second year in a row, again to Brisbane, this time by a margin of 50 points, where the final score was Brisbane Lions 20.14 (134) to Collingwood 12.12 (84).

In the 2004 season, Collingwood's on-field performance under Malthouse dropped when they finished thirteenth with eight wins and fourteen losses. In the 2005 season, Collingwood went from bad to worse when they finished fifteenth (second-last) on the ladder with five wins and seventeen losses.

In the 2006 season, Collingwood under Malthouse returned to the finals series after finishing fifth on the ladder, but were defeated in the elimination final by Western Bulldogs by 41 points. In the 2007 season, Collingwood made the finals again, but were eliminated by the eventual premiers Geelong in the preliminary final by five points. In the 2008 season, Collingwood returned to the finals but were eliminated by St Kilda in the semi-final by 34 points.

In July 2009, Collingwood Football Club president Eddie McGuire produced a succession plan in which Malthouse was to hand over the coaching reins to club legend and assistant coach Nathan Buckley at the end of the 2011 season. Also in the 2009 season, Collingwood under Malthouse made the finals again but were eliminated by the eventual premiers Geelong in the preliminary final by seventy-three points.

In the 2010 season, Malthouse guided Collingwood to a premiership win after the first drawn AFL/VFL grand final since 1977, where Collingwood claimed premiership success with a resounding 56-point win over St Kilda in the replay of the 2010 AFL Grand Final, where the final score was Collingwood 16.12 (108) to St Kilda 7.10 (52). This was the club's biggest ever win in a grand final and its first since 1990.

In the 2011 season, Malthouse guided Collingwood to another grand final, this time against the Geelong Cats. After a dramatic three-point win over Hawthorn in the preliminary final, he was shown on TV in tears in the coach's box after his side came from 17 points down at the final change to book their place in Malthouse's fifth grand final as Collingwood Football Club senior coach and his eighth overall. Collingwood lost the 2011 AFL Grand Final to Geelong by a margin of 38 points, where the final score was Geelong 18.11 (119) to Collingwood 12.9 (81). The game was his final one as Collingwood senior coach, as Malthouse handed the coaching reins to assistant coach Nathan Buckley after the game, as part of the planned transition under the two year succession plan. Malthouse also stated that he would not be taking on the position as Director of Coaching at Collingwood after the loss and that he had made this decision six weeks earlier. In addition, while coaching Collingwood, Malthouse spent time as a guest media commentator for SEN 1116.

Years later in 2019, Malthouse told the Herald Sun of the circumstances of his departure from Collingwood as senior coach and was asked if he considered the club's decision to seek a coaching handover deal the equivalent of a sacking? Malthouse said: “Yeah, I do, I have always thought that”. Malthouse then stated that the director of coaching job description role he had agreed to in the middle of 2009 was nothing like how it was going to look in actuality at the end of 2011. “I must have spoken to Nathan Buckley, I can't remember when, and he said ‘Look, I don't want you in the coaches’ box, which I can understand, but he should have said at the time when they signed the deal” Malthouse said. Buckley said "I don't want you talking to the coaches on the bench; I don't want you talking to the coaches. It is pretty hard not talking to the coaches when you are the director of coaching, so I thought he doesn't want me to be director of coaching, There was no point in staying".

=== Carlton: 2013–2015 ===
Malthouse was announced as the senior coach of the Carlton Football Club on 11 September 2012 for the next three seasons, when he replaced Brett Ratten as Carlton senior coach, after Ratten was sacked at the end of the 2012 season. In the 2013 season, the Blues under Malthouse initially finished ninth on the ladder with eleven wins and eleven losses, but were promoted to eighth place, therefore being granted a place in the finals after Essendon were relegated to ninth position after being penalised for their well-documented supplements scandal. A one-point win over Port Adelaide in the final round prevented North Melbourne from overtaking Carlton on percentage. Carlton subsequently defeated Richmond in its elimination final, thus making Malthouse the most successful finals coach ever. However, Carlton under Malthouse were eliminated by the Sydney Swans in the semi-final in the 2013 finals series.

Carlton struggled for the remainder of his tenure at the club. Under Malthouse they began the 2014 season with four consecutive losses and at the end of the 2014 season, Carlton finished with seven wins, one draw and fourteen losses en route to a 13th-place finish on the ladder. In the 2015 season, the club sat last with a record of 1–7 after eight rounds. As the club's on-field performances deteriorated, there was intense media speculation about Malthouse's position, as well as the public relationship between Malthouse and club administration, most notably president Mark LoGiudice and CEO Steven Trigg, who had both been in the roles since mid-2014. On 26 May 2015, hours after giving a radio interview on Melbourne Station SEN in which Malthouse was highly critical of the club's administrators, Malthouse was sacked as Carlton Football Club senior coach. Malthouse was then replaced by assistant coach John Barker as caretaker senior coach of Carlton Football Club for the rest of the 2015 season.

Years later in 2021, Malthouse reflected on his tenure as senior coach of Carlton in the Herald Sun and stated: "The biggest disappointment of my coaching career is that I should have looked further into Carlton's lack of forward thinking, before I signed on to coach the Blues" and "I was staggered at the Carlton board's pre-occupation with past players and past premierships".

Malthouse then further eleborated stating that "he had a lack of support from the board and he was reminded in one regular board meeting that the Blues had won 16 premiership cups. he quickly informed them that they had in fact won just a single AFL premiership (1995), which put the club in the low range for number of flags won since the AFL announced itself in 1990". "In another board meeting he was informed of a five-year plan to win a premiership. I was in my second year at the club and I was told we were already three years into a plan that I was completely unaware of. They asked for my assessment, but didn't like the answer". "It came as a great shock to most of the board members that the plan was totally unachievable in that time frame, and that in fact, until the constraints of contract management were lifted we were going to stay a middle-of-the-road team". "Too many players on an ageing list were overpaid or over-committed in lengthy contracts, in contrast to their ability. There was no room to move, or even to retain star power on the hit list of opposing clubs, and until we could afford multiple trades or multiple draft picks we were carrying the burden like baggage".

== Statistics ==
=== Playing statistics ===
Legend
G	Goals	K	Kicks	D	Disposals	T	Tackles
B	Behinds	H	Handballs	M	Marks

Season	Team	No.	Games	Totals							Averages (per game)						
Season	Team	No.	Games	G	B	K	H	D	M	T	G	B	K	H	D	M	T
1972	St Kilda	37	9	0	0	42	6	48	13	—N/a	0.0	0.0	4.7	0.7	5.3	1.4	—N/a
1973	St Kilda	37	16	2	0	170	33	203	41	—N/a	0.1	0.0	10.6	2.1	12.7	2.6	—N/a
1974	St Kilda	37	7	1	2	53	11	64	7	—N/a	0.1	0.3	7.6	1.6	9.1	1.0	—N/a
1975	St Kilda	22	18	1	2	133	45	178	29	—N/a	0.1	0.1	7.4	2.5	9.9	1.6	—N/a
1976	St Kilda	22	3	1	2	19	4	23	0	—N/a	0.3	0.7	6.3	1.3	7.7	0.0	—N/a
1976	Richmond	22	9	3	1	107	49	156	22	—N/a	0.3	0.1	11.9	5.4	17.3	2.4	—N/a
1977	Richmond	28	13	5	4	144	72	216	24	—N/a	0.4	0.4	11.1	5.5	16.6	1.8	—N/a
1978	Richmond	7	20	1	2	244	94	338	49	—N/a	0.1	0.1	12.2	4.7	16.9	2.5	—N/a
1979	Richmond	7	10	1	1	99	48	147	16	—N/a	0.1	0.1	9.9	4.8	14.7	1.6	—N/a
1980^{#}	Richmond	7	23	0	3	210	108	318	39	—N/a	0.0	0.1	9.1	4.7	13.8	1.7	—N/a
1981	Richmond	7	21	0	0	203	103	306	33	—N/a	0.0	0.0	9.7	4.9	14.6	1.6	—N/a
1982	Richmond	7	23	0	0	195	86	281	42	—N/a	0.0	0.0	8.5	3.7	12.2	1.8	—N/a
1983	Richmond	7	2	0	1	26	2	28	1	—N/a	0.0	0.5	13.0	1.0	14.0	0.5	—N/a
Career			174	15	18	1645	661	2306	316	—N/a	0.1	0.1	9.5	3.8	13.3	1.8	—N/a

== Head coaching record ==
Team	Year	Home and Away Season					Finals				
Team	Year	Won	Lost	Drew	Win %	Finish	Won	Lost	Drew	Win %	Result
FOOT	1984	11	11	0	.500	7th out of 12	—	—	—	—	—
FOOT	1985	16	6	0	.727	2nd out of 12	1	2	0	.333	Lost to Hawthorn in Preliminary Final
FOOT	1986	11	11	0	.500	8th out of 12	—	—	—	—	—
FOOT	1987	11	10	1	.523	7th out of 14	—	—	—	—	—
FOOT	1988	11	11	0	.500	8th out of 14	—	—	—	—	—
FOOT	1989	6	15	1	.295	13th out of 14	—	—	—	—	—
FOOT total		66	64	2	.508		1	2	0	.333	
WCE	1990	16	6	0	.727	3rd out of 14	1	2	1	.275	Lost to Essendon in Preliminary Final
WCE	1991	19	3	0	.864	1st out of 15	2	2	0	.500	Lost to Hawthorn in Grand Final
WCE	1992	15	6	1	.705	4th out of 15	3	0	0	1.000	Defeated Geelong in Grand Final
WCE	1993	12	8	0	.600	6th out of 15	1	1	0	.500	Lost to Essendon in Semi Final
WCE	1994	16	6	0	.727	1st out of 15	3	0	0	1.000	Defeated Geelong in Grand Final
WCE	1995	14	8	0	.636	5th out of 16	0	2	0	.000	Lost to North Melbourne in Semi Final
WCE	1996	15	7	0	.682	4th out of 16	1	1	0	.500	Lost to Essendon in Semi Final
WCE	1997	13	9	0	.591	5th out of 16	0	2	0	.000	Lost to North Melbourne in Semi Final
WCE	1998	12	10	0	.545	7th out of 16	0	1	0	.000	Lost to Footscray in Elimination Final
WCE	1999	12	10	0	.545	5th out of 16	1	1	0	.500	Lost to Carlton in Semi Final
WCE total		144	73	1	.663		12	12	1	.500	
COLL	2000	7	15	0	.318	15th out of 16	—	—	—	—	—
COLL	2001	11	11	0	.500	9th out of 16	—	—	—	—	—
COLL	2002	13	9	0	.591	4th out of 16	2	1	0	.667	Lost to Brisbane in Grand Final
COLL	2003	15	7	0	.682	2nd out of 16	2	1	0	.667	Lost to Brisbane in Grand Final
COLL	2004	8	14	0	.318	13th out of 16	—	—	—	—	—
COLL	2005	5	17	0	.318	15th out of 16	—	—	—	—	—
COLL	2006	14	8	0	.636	5th out of 16	0	1	0	.000	Lost to Western Bulldogs in Elimination Final
COLL	2007	13	9	0	.591	6th out of 16	2	1	0	.667	Lost to Geelong in Preliminary Final
COLL	2008	12	10	0	.545	8th out of 16	1	1	0	.500	Lost to St Kilda in Semi Final
COLL	2009	15	7	0	.682	4th out of 16	1	2	0	.333	Lost to Geelong in Preliminary Final
COLL	2010	17	4	1	.795	1st out of 16	3	0	1	.875	Defeated St Kilda in Grand Final
COLL	2011	20	2	0	.909	1st out of 17	2	1	0	.667	Lost to Geelong in Grand Final
COLL total		150	113	1	.570		13	8	1	.614	
CARL	2013	11	11	0	.500	8th out of 18	1	1	0	.599	Lost to Sydney in Semi Final
CARL	2014	7	14	1	.341	13th out of 18	—	—	—	—	—
CARL	2015	1	7	0	.125	fired after round 8	—	—	—	—	—
CARL total		19	32	1	.375		1	1	0	.500	
		369	282	5	.566		27	23	2	.538	

== Honours and achievements ==
=== Playing honours ===
Team

- VFL/AFL Premiership (Richmond): 1980

=== Coaching honours ===
Team

- VFL/AFL Premiership (West Coast): 1992, 1994
- VFL/AFL Premiership (Collingwood): 2010
- McClelland Trophy (West Coast): 1991, 1994
- McClelland Trophy (Collingwood): 2010, 2011
- Pre-Season Cup (Collingwood): 2011

Individual

- Jock McHale Medal: 1992, 1994, 2010
- All-Australian: 1991, 2010
- Australia Coach for International Rules Football: 2008, 2010
- Western Australia State of Origin Coach: 1991–1993

== Family ==
Malthouse is married with four children, including sports reporter and AFL boundary rider Christi Malthouse.

== Media career ==
Malthouse spent time as a guest media commentator for SEN 1116. In 2012, he was a media commentator for the Seven Network and radio station 3AW and a journalist for The West Australian. In addition, he has appeared weekly on the 5AA sports show with Graham Cornes and Stephen Rowe. In 2016, Malthouse replaced Dermott Brereton as a commentator of matches on SEN 1116 as well as being named coach of The Recruit. After being fired by SEN at the end of 2017, Malthouse joined the ABC as a commentator on its football coverage.

== Between coaching period ==
Malthouse was quoted as saying he would like a senior coaching role with Cricket Australia. He has released an autobiography, The Ox is Slow but the Earth is Patient.

Malthouse joined 3AW and Seven Network in media roles after finishing coaching at Collingwood.

In 2012, La Trobe University appointed Malthouse as a Vice Chancellor's Fellow. As a leader and mentor, Malthouse works with staff, students and the community and leads the development of sport at the university – including programs to support La Trobe's academic programs in sports journalism, sports management, physiotherapy podiatry and other sports related academic programs.

Malthouse wrote an opinion piece, "Academia and Experience", about his approach to his new role which was published as a La Trobe University Opinion on 14 February 2012. In this he wrote that "'Education for the future needs a lot more than specialised knowledge and skills. It requires life experience. This is what La Trobe expects me to bring to my new role as Vice-Chancellors Fellow. It is a challenge I will relish. The aim is to place more emphasis on the non-academic side of campus life: practical experience, teamwork, leadership skills and community involvement. In my view, the importance of these aspects of education real-world experience are being seriously overlooked by too many institutions."

== Legacy ==
Malthouse has been described as a "remote and intimidating character, an old fashioned patrician whose passion for the game could never be questioned but whose love of its people was never expressed" and a "consummate football politician". "Malthouse's ability to adapt to a game that is virtually unrecognisable is testament to his insatiable appetite to compete and win".

Former West Coast Eagles CEO Brian Cook, who worked with Malthouse at the helm of Malthouse's tenure as senior coach of West Coast Eagles stated "His dedication and his determination are old-school values which he certainly had as a young coach. He was very consistent and very dogmatic and always had his own way about how he wanted his players to train and play. He was quite inflexible about that. He also had a large say on pretty much every aspect of the footy department. He seems to still have all those things today. I was a great admirer of the way he would focus on the one-percenters and make sure his players were completely professional in his way to carry them out. Mick always had the ability to attract players of great character but without huge amounts of talent and make them into great footballers. He'll go out as one of the great coaches of all time".

Former Collingwood Football Club football operations manager Neil Balme, who worked with Malthouse in Malthouse's tenure as senior coach of Collingwood stated "It's hard to say he's not unique because there aren't many like him. He loves the game and encourages people to be honest with what they say they're going to be. He's very much a footballer's footballer".

Former Carlton Football Club captain Marc Murphy, who played under Malthouse, both praised and criticised Malthouse in Malthouse's tenure as senior coach of Carlton, stating "his time at Carlton, I don't think he was really in it for the right reasons. Then once it turned pear-shaped, it was all about him, unfortunately, at the end and I was left to be thrown at the bus quite a bit. He was obviously a terrific coach, but unfortunately at Carlton for us and for me and the boys who were there working so hard, it just didn't work out. It was extremely difficult, but Mick was a very autocratic leader. It was all whatever he said basically goes. I could have my input, but I couldn't get really any traction whatsoever".

Former Carlton Football Club player Troy Menzel who played under Malthouse, praised Malthouse in Malthouse's tenure as senior coach of Carlton, stating “I got along really well with Mick, I was probably one of the few in my time at Carlton who had positive experiences with him, I clicked really well with Mick, he taught me a lot and he has an amazing football brain, The way he sees things and the way he explains things, you'd go, ‘I would never have thought of it that way. But I will say he did have some different methods, He had some interesting methods, Mick, but from my end, it was pretty positive”.

Former Carlton Football Club player Mitch Robinson who played under Malthouse, described Malthouse as "He has that tough love, he’s an old-school coach. He knows how to give you a spray".

== Playing and coaching achievements ==
- 1985 and 1991 Players Association Coach of the Year
- 1991 Inaugural AFL Coach of the Year
- 1992 Institute of Sport Coach of the Year
- Richmond premiership player 1980
- West Coast premiership coach 1992 and 1994
- West Coast Eagles Hall of Fame
- 2008 International Rules Series Coach
- 2010 International Rules Series Coach
- 2010 AFLCA Coach of the Year
- Collingwood premiership coach 2010
- 2nd longest serving coach of the Collingwood FC behind Jock McHale.
- Most games coached at AFL/VFL level.
- 3rd most wins as coach (all time).

== Bibliography ==
- Collins, Ben; Eddy, Dan (2016). Champions : conversations with great players & coaches of Australian football (3rd ed.). Docklands, Victoria: The Slattery Media Group. ISBN 9780992379162.
- Malthouse, Christi (2012). Malthouse: A football life. Allen & Unwin. ISBN 978-1742378145.
