= Patrick Cripps =

Australian rules footballer

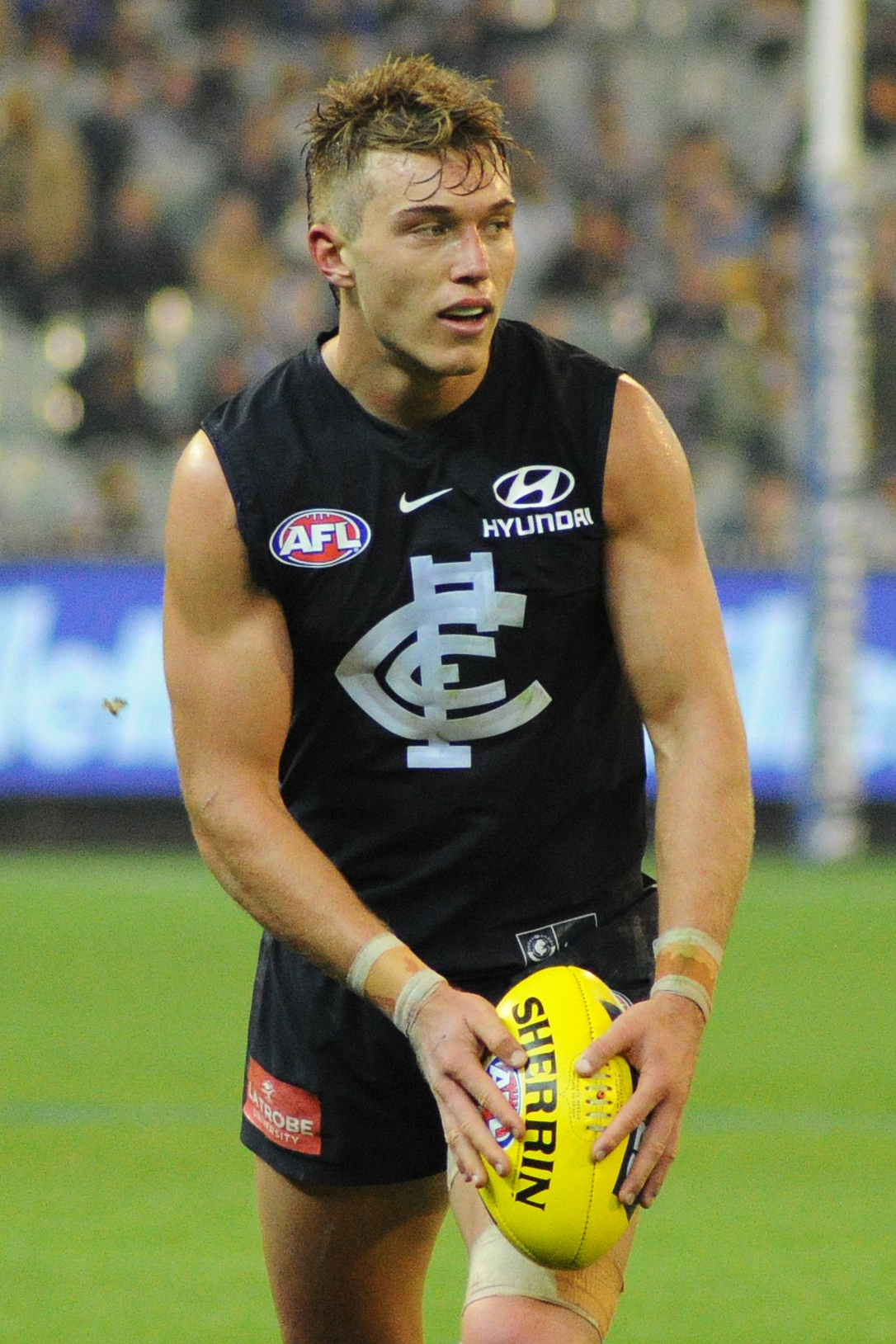
- Cripps playing for Carlton in 2018

Personal information
- Full name: Patrick Cripps
- Nickname: Crippa
- Born: 18 March 1995 (age 31); Perth, Western Australia
- Original team: East Fremantle (WAFL)
- Draft: No. 13, 2013 national draft
- Debut: Round 4, 2014, Carlton vs. Melbourne, at the Melbourne Cricket Ground
- Height: 195 cm (6 ft 5 in)
- Weight: 93 kg (205 lb)
- Position: Midfielder

Club information
- Current club: Carlton
- Number: 9

Playing career^{1}
Years	Club	Games (Goals)
2014–	Carlton	255 (143)

Representative team honours^{2}
Years	Team	Games (Goals)
2020	All-Stars	1 (0)
2026	Western Australia	1 (0)
- ^{1} Playing statistics correct to the end of the 2026 season.^{2} Representative statistics correct as of 2026.

Career highlights
- Carlton co-captain: 2019–2021; captain: 2022–; 2× Brownlow Medal: 2022, 2024; Leigh Matthews Trophy: 2019; 4× All-Australian team: 2018, 2019, 2022 (vc), 2024 (vc); 5× John Nicholls Medal: 2015, 2018, 2019, 2022, 2024; Western Australia State of Origin Captain: 2026

Patrick Cripps (born 18 March 1995) is a professional Australian rules footballer playing for the Carlton Football Club in the Australian Football League (AFL). Cripps won the Leigh Matthews Trophy in 2019, and is a dual Brownlow Medallist, four-time All-Australian and five-time John Nicholls Medallist; he was the second-youngest player to win the latter when he first won the award in 2015 and has won the equal-most at the club, along with Nicholls. Cripps served as Carlton co-captain from 2019 to 2021, and he has served as the sole captain since the 2022 season.

== Early life ==
Cripps was born in Perth, but at a young age he moved to the small farming town of Northampton in Western Australia's Mid West. Cripps played junior football for local club Northampton Rams before boarding at Aquinas College in Perth and playing representative juniors and colts for the East Fremantle Football Club in the West Australian Football League. He represented Western Australia at the 2013 AFL Under-18 Championships, serving as vice-captain and winning a place in the All-Australian Team for the tournament.

== AFL career ==
=== 2014–2017: Early career and rise in form ===
Cripps was recruited by the Carlton Football Club with its first-round selection in the 2013 AFL National Draft (No. 13 overall). Even as a junior, his playing style as a strong-bodied midfielder with a strong ability to win clearances by handpass drew comparisons with club Hall of Famer and AFL Team of the Century player Greg Williams. Cripps made his senior debut against Melbourne in Round 4, 2014, but he played only three matches during the season due to injuries. Cripps changed from his debut jumper number of 16 at the end of the 2014 season to number 9 after it was vacated after the delisting of Kane Lucas.

In just his second season, Cripps, standing at 195 cm (6 ft 5 in), established himself as a top inside midfielder, finishing 8th in the league for contested possessions and 11th for clearances, and earning strong acclaim for his attacking use of handball. He finished second in the 2015 AFL Rising Star award after holding favouritism with bookmakers for much of the year, and he won the John Nicholls Medal as Carlton's best and fairest to become the second-youngest winner in the award's history.

In 2016, Cripps further solidified his place as one of the best inside midfielders in the AFL, amassing 185 clearances at an average of 8.8 per game, ranked #1 in the AFL, as well as 354 contested possessions at an average of 16.9, ranked #2 in the AFL for the season. After a slow start to the 2017 season whilst recovering from a back injury, Cripps found form to average 24.9 disposals and 6.7 clearances from 15 games before his season was cut short with a broken leg.

=== 2018–2019: Co-captaincy and AFLPA MVP ===
Before the beginning of the 2018 season, he was announced as joint vice-captain of Carlton, along with defender Sam Docherty. Cripps had a magnificent 2018, winning his second Carlton best and fairest, All-Australian honours, and finishing second in voting for the Leigh Matthews Trophy. Averaging over 29 touches a game, Cripps managed to become the leading contested possession winner and breaking the league record for a single-season haul, eclipsing Patrick Dangerfield's previous benchmark of 386 with 388. He later re-signed with the club until the end of the 2021 season.

In October 2018, Cripps and Sam Docherty were named Carlton co-captains.

In 2019, Cripps would deliver his finest season yet. In the pre-season 2019 AFLX Grand Final, Cripps, playing for the composite team known as 'Rampage', humorously performed a place kick, a kick that had become entirely obsolete for Australian rules football in the 1950s. In the 2019 season proper, Cripps averaged a staggering 8.5 clearances, 17 contested possessions and 6.2 tackles a game.

After Round 11 2019, Carlton coach Brendon Bolton was sacked due to poor performance. Preceding Carlton's next game against Brisbane, Cripps revealed he almost didn't play due to being "mentally fried". Cripps ended up playing that game kicking 4 goals and being named best on ground in the Blues' 15 point victory.

In 2019, he was awarded the Leigh Matthews Trophy with 832 votes.

=== 2020–2021: COVID years and form slump ===
It has been speculated that Patrick Cripps was suffering a chronic back issue during the seasons of 2020 and 2021, which saw considerable drops in his performance. However, this was never confirmed by the club or Patrick himself. In 2021, Cripps re-signed with Carlton until 2027 making him effectively a Blue for life. With a drop of form across both COVID impacted seasons, Cripps faced criticism by multiple former AFL players with him being accused of being a "journeyman" and playing for million dollar contract

=== 2022–2023: Sole captaincy and Brownlow win ===
The year 2022 started with Patrick polling 25 of a possible maximum 30 votes in the AFLCA MVP over the first three rounds, before injuring a hamstring against the Gold Coast Suns in round four. Cripps won the 2022 Brownlow Medal by a single vote, becoming the first Carlton player to win it since Chris Judd in 2010.

In round 3 of the 2023 season, Cripps recorded a career-best 42 disposals in Carlton's ten-point win over Greater Western Sydney.

=== 2024–present: Record-breaking Brownlow win ===
In 2024 Cripps had another standout year, averaging 8 clearances and 28.8 disposals a game. He came second in the AFL Coaches Association's Champion Player award, the AFL Players' Association MVP award and the AFLPA Best Captain award. He was also the vice captain for the 2024 all-Australian team. Going into the 2024 Brownlow night Cripps was one of the favourites to win. He ended up tallying 45 votes and securing his second Brownlow, the most any player has ever received in the three votes system, until Nick Daicos in 2026 with 47 votes. Cripps also won his fifth John Nicholls Medal in 2024, equalling the record held by the award's namesake, John Nicholls.

== Statistics ==
Updated to the end of the 2026 season.

Legend
G	Goals	K	Kicks	D	Disposals	T	Tackles
B	Behinds	H	Handballs	M	Marks
±	Won that season's Brownlow Medal

Season	Team	No.	Games	Totals							Averages (per game)							Votes
Season	Team	No.	Games	G	B	K	H	D	M	T	G	B	K	H	D	M	T	Votes
2014	Carlton	16	3	0	1	10	17	27	5	9	0.0	0.3	3.3	5.7	9.0	1.7	3.0	0
2015	Carlton	9	20	6	13	158	313	471	64	98	0.3	0.7	7.9	15.7	23.6	3.2	4.9	6
2016	Carlton	9	21	10	14	176	390	566	68	139	0.5	0.7	8.4	18.6	27.0	3.2	6.6	18
2017	Carlton	9	15	7	4	168	206	374	65	90	0.5	0.3	11.2	13.7	24.9	4.3	6.0	5
2018	Carlton	9	22	11	15	259	393	652	92	138	0.5	0.7	11.8	17.9	29.6	4.2	6.3	20
2019	Carlton	9	20	13	6	212	348	560	62	123	0.7	0.3	10.6	17.4	28.0	3.1	6.2	26
2020 (Note: The 2020 season was played with 17 home-and-away matches per team (down from 22) and 16-minute quarters with time on (down from 20-minute quarters with time on) due to the impact of the COVID-19 pandemic.)	Carlton	9	17	7	11	152	182	334	40	81	0.4	0.6	8.9	10.7	19.6	2.4	4.8	10
2021	Carlton	9	20	13	11	163	305	468	63	85	0.7	0.6	8.2	15.3	23.4	3.2	4.3	5
2022	Carlton	9	21	20	9	226	365	591	76	105	1.0	0.4	10.8	17.4	28.1	3.6	5.0	29^{±}
2023	Carlton	9	24	9	14	226	370	596	51	130	0.4	0.6	9.4	15.4	24.8	2.1	5.4	22
2024	Carlton	9	24	17	6	266	426	692	63	129	0.7	0.3	11.1	17.8	28.8	2.6	5.4	45^{±}
2025	Carlton	9	23	14	17	220	336	556	50	132	0.6	0.7	9.6	14.6	24.2	2.2	5.7	19
2026	Carlton	9	25	16	18	256	400	656	66	122	0.6	0.7	10.2	16.0	26.2	2.6	4.9	27
Career			255	143	139	2492	4050	6542	765	1381	0.6	0.5	9.8	15.9	25.7	3.0	5.4	232

== Honours and achievements ==
- Carlton co-captain: 2019–2021; captain: 2022–present
- 2× Brownlow Medal: 2022, 2024
- Leigh Matthews Trophy: 2019
- 4× All-Australian team: 2018, 2019, 2022, 2024
- 5× John Nicholls Medal: 2015, 2018, 2019, 2022, 2024
- All-Stars representative honours in State of Origin for Bushfire Relief Match
- Western Australia State of Origin Captain: 2026

== Personal life ==
Cripps is related to former West Coast Eagles footballer Chris Mainwaring through his father. Cripps' father is Mainwaring's first cousin, and the two are also related to current West Coast Eagles player Jamie Cripps.

On 31 December 2022, Cripps married his partner Monique Fontana. They had a baby daughter together in 2024.
