= Drouin Secondary College =

Coordinates: 38°08′46.9572″S 145°51′3.4452″E

- Drouin, Victoria; Australia

Information
- Type: Public, co-educational, secondary
- Motto: Finem Respice
- Established: 1956
- Years: 7 to 12
- Enrollment: 1251
- Website: http://www.drouinsc.vic.edu.au/

Drouin Secondary College is a secondary school in Drouin, Victoria, located outside of Melbourne, Australia. It was established in 1956. Drouin's mottos are "Achievement, Respect, Commitment, Community" and "Finem Respice", which means "look to the end". There are 103 staff members at the school.

== Staff ==
Principals
Name	From	Until
Roy Barnes	1956	1965
Clarrie Wilson	1966	1979
Tom McGrath	1980	1987
Kevin Jenkins	1988	1993
Rod Dunlop	1994	2007
Shane Wainwright	2007	2015
Deb Gentle	2015	2021
Elizabeth Godwin	2021	ongoing

== Notable former students ==
- Peter Knights
- Dale Thomas
- Gary Ablett Sr
- Jai Newcombe
