= 1991 Hawthorn Football Club season =

67th season in the Australian Football League

Hawthorn Football Club
1991 season
- President: Trevor Coote
- Coach: Alan Joyce
- Captain: Michael Tuck
- Home ground: Princes Park; Waverley Park
- AFL season: 16–6 (2nd)
- Finals series: Premiers (Defeated West Coast 139–86)
- Best and Fairest: Ben Allan
- Leading goalkicker: Jason Dunstall (82)
- Highest home attendance: 75,230 (Grand Final vs. West Coast)
- Lowest home attendance: 5,741 (Round 13 vs. Brisbane Bears)
- Average home attendance: 28,551

The 1991 season was the Hawthorn Football Club's 67th season in the Australian Football League and 90th overall.

== Fixture ==
=== Premiership season ===
Rd	Date and local time	Opponent	Scores (Hawthorn's scores indicated in bold)			Venue	Attendance	Record
Rd	Date and local time	Opponent	Home	Away	Result	Venue	Attendance	Record
1	Friday, 22 March (7:40 pm)	Adelaide	24.11 (155)	**9.15 (69)**	Lost by 86 points	Football Park (A)	44,902	0–1
2	Monday, 1 April (2:10 pm)	Sydney	**25.16 (166)**	10.15 (75)	Won by 91 points	Princes Park (H)	13,815	1–1
3	Saturday, 6 April (2:10 pm)	Richmond	**20.16 (136)**	11.13 (79)	Won by 57 points	Waverley Park (H)	25,960	2–1
4	Bye							
5	Saturday, 20 April (2:10 pm)	Footscray	17.16 (118)	**16.11 (107)**	Lost by 11 points	Waverley Park (A)	21,448	2–2
6	Sunday, 28 April (2:10 pm)	Fitzroy	11.8 (74)	**36.15 (231)**	Won by 157 points	North Hobart Oval (A)	13,335	3–2
7	Saturday, 4 May (2:10 pm)	West Coast	**8.14 (62)**	21.18 (144)	Lost by 82 points	Princes Park (H)	18,585	3–3
8	Saturday, 11 May (2:10 pm)	Carlton	**18.14 (122)**	11.12 (78)	Won by 44 points	Waverley Park (H)	29,727	4–3
9	Saturday, 18 May (2:10 pm)	Essendon	**15.13 (103)**	13.9 (87)	Won by 16 points	Waverley Park (H)	40,537	5–3
10	Saturday, 25 May (2:10 pm)	Collingwood	16.12 (108)	**23.13 (151)**	Won by 43 points	Waverley Park (A)	45,595	6–3
11	Saturday, 1 June (2:10 pm)	St Kilda	**10.17 (77)**	15.13 (103)	Lost by 26 points	Princes Park (H)	20,832	6–4
12	Monday, 10 June (2:10 pm)	Geelong	**13.18 (96)**	20.16 (136)	Lost by 40 points	Princes Park (H)	23,123	6–5
13	Saturday, 15 June (2:10 pm)	Brisbane Bears	**22.17 (149)**	9.8 (62)	Won by 87 points	Princes Park (H)	5,741	7–5
14	Saturday, 22 June (2:10 pm)	Melbourne	11.11 (77)	**19.13 (127)**	Won by 50 points	Waverley Park (A)	30,664	8–5
15	Friday, 28 June (7:40 pm)	North Melbourne	18.7 (115)	**27.17 (179)**	Won by 64 points	Melbourne Cricket Ground (A)	25,819	9–5
16	Saturday, 6 July (2:10 pm)	Adelaide	**23.20 (158)**	14.11 (95)	Won by 63 points	Waverley Park (H)	21,715	10–5
17	Sunday, 14 July (2:10 pm)	Sydney	14.19 (103)	**15.24 (114)**	Won by 11 points	Sydney Cricket Ground (A)	12,143	11–5
18	Saturday, 20 July (2:10 pm)	Richmond	13.10 (88)	**13.16 (94)**	Won by 6 points	Waverley Park (A)	24,731	12–5
19	Bye							
20	Saturday, 3 August (2:10 pm)	Footscray	**12.11 (83)**	10.9 (69)	Won by 14 points	Waverley Park (H)	20,670	13–5
21	Saturday, 10 August (2:10 pm)	Fitzroy	**28.27 (195)**	10.9 (69)	Won by 126 points	Princes Park (H)	11,500	14–5
22	Sunday, 18 August (2:10 pm)	West Coast	15.9 (99)	**11.9 (75)**	Lost by 24 points	Subiaco Oval (A)	35,001	14–6
23	Saturday, 24 August (2:10 pm)	Carlton	8.10 (58)	**23.18 (156)**	Won by 98 points	Princes Park (A)	18,521	15–6
24	Saturday, 31 August (2:10 pm)	Essendon	9.9 (63)	**21.17 (143)**	Won by 80 points	Waverley Park (A)	48,311	16–6

=== Finals series ===
Rd	Date and local time	Opponent	Scores (Hawthorn's scores indicated in bold)			Venue	Attendance
Rd	Date and local time	Opponent	Home	Away	Result	Venue	Attendance
Qualifying final	Sunday, 8 September (2:30 pm)	West Coast	15.11 (101)	**18.16 (124)**	Won by 23 points	Subiaco Oval (A)	44,142
2nd semi-final	Saturday, 14 September (2:30 pm)	Geelong	**13.17 (95)**	13.15 (93)	Won by 2 points	Waverley Park (H)	63,733
Grand Final	Saturday, 28 September (2:50 pm)	West Coast	**20.19 (139)**	13.8 (86)	Won by 53 points	Waverley Park (H)	75,230

== Ladder ==
(P)	Premiers
	Qualified for finals

#	Team	P	W	L	D	PF	PA	%	Pts
1	West Coast	22	19	3	0	2485	1532	162.2	76
2	Hawthorn (P)	22	16	6	0	2793	2055	135.9	64
3	Geelong	22	16	6	0	2660	2021	131.6	64
4	St Kilda	22	14	7	1	2512	2087	120.4	58
5	Melbourne	22	13	9	0	2355	2123	110.9	52
6	Essendon	22	13	9	0	2203	2017	109.2	52
7	Collingwood	22	12	9	1	2349	2033	115.5	50
8	North Melbourne	22	12	10	0	2456	2693	91.2	48
9	Adelaide	22	10	12	0	2041	2282	89.4	40
10	Footscray	22	9	12	1	1815	2064	87.9	38
11	Carlton	22	8	14	0	1878	2113	88.9	32
12	Sydney	22	7	14	1	2360	2778	85.0	30
13	Richmond	22	7	15	0	2141	2450	87.4	28
14	Fitzroy	22	4	18	0	1837	2771	66.3	16
15	Brisbane Bears	22	3	19	0	1976	2842	69.5	12

Rules for classification: 1. premiership points; 2. percentage; 3. points for
Average score: 102.6
Source: AFL Tables
