= 2022 Brownlow Medal =

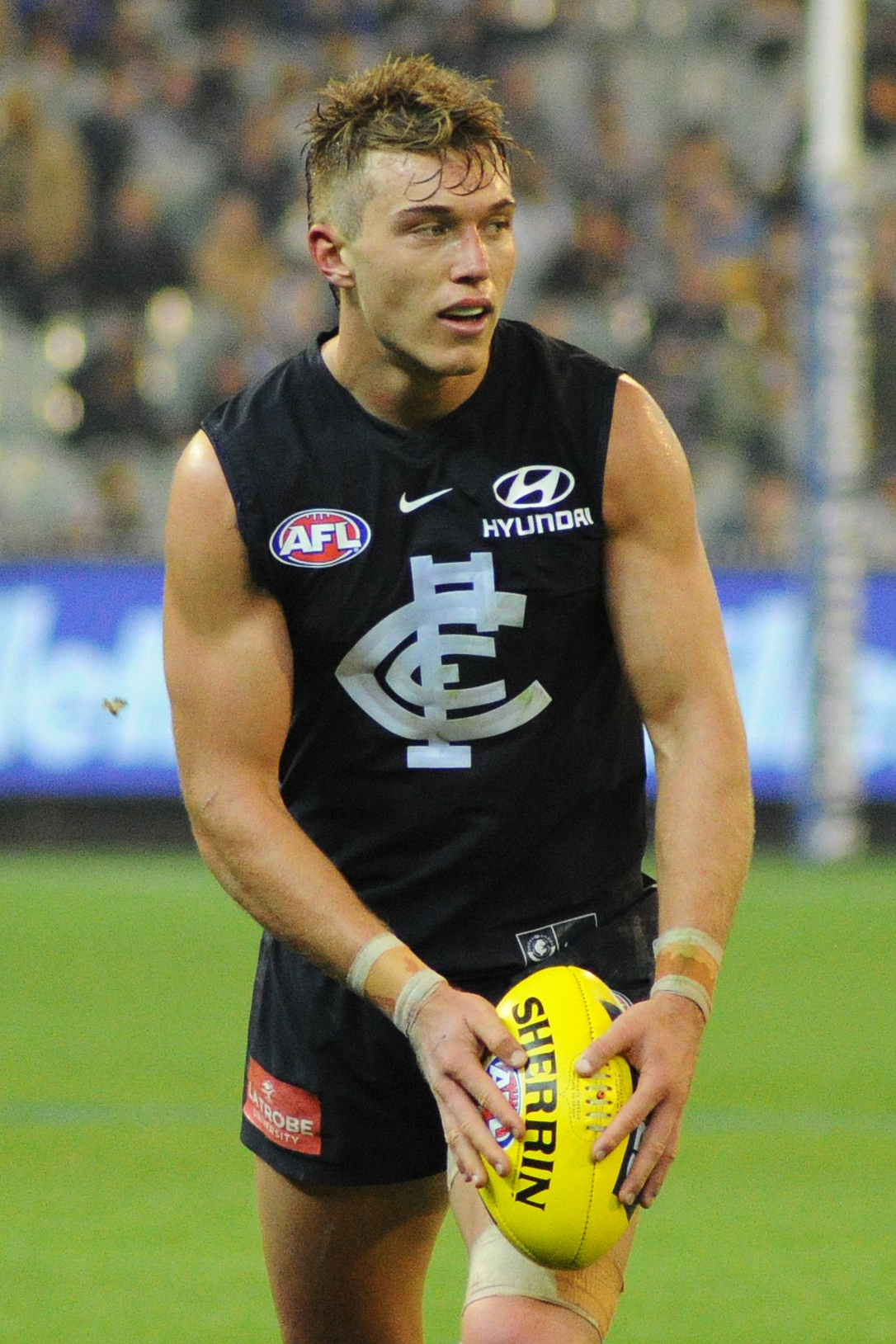
- 2022 Brownlow Medallist, Patrick Cripps
- Date: Sunday, 18 September 2022
- Location: Crown Palladium
- Hosted by: Hamish McLachlan and Rebecca Maddern
- Winner: Patrick Cripps (Carlton) (29 votes)

Television/radio coverage
- Network: Seven Network; Telstra

The 2022 Brownlow Medal was the 95th year the award was presented to the player adjudged the best and fairest player during the Australian Football League (AFL) home-and-away season. It was won by Carlton midfielder Patrick Cripps. The 2022 Brownlow Medal count was originally scheduled for Monday 19 September, its traditional date on the Monday before the grand final. It was rescheduled to Sunday 18 September at a week's notice, to avoid a clash with the funeral of Elizabeth II. The event returned to its conventional format and venue—a gala dinner at the Crown Palladium in Melbourne—after having been held virtually for the previous two seasons due to the COVID-19 pandemic.

Cripps' win was not without controversy. Cripps was initially suspended by the Match Review Panel and AFL Tribunal in Round 21, for rough conduct in a front-on contest against Brisbane Lions' Callum Ah Chee, which ruled him ineligible and would have seen him miss the final rounds, in which he polled the winning votes; Carlton had appealed the suspension to the AFL Appeals Board and was successful in overturning it.

== Leading vote-getters ==
	Player	Votes
1st	Patrick Cripps (Carlton)	29
2nd	Lachie Neale (Brisbane)	28
3rd	Touk Miller (Gold Coast)	27
=4th	Andrew Brayshaw (Fremantle)	25
=4th	Clayton Oliver (Melbourne)	25
6th	Christian Petracca (Melbourne)	24
7th	Callum Mills (Sydney)	21
=8th	Jeremy Cameron (Geelong)	19
=8th	Dion Prestia (Richmond)	19
10th	Zach Merrett (Essendon)	17

== Voting procedure ==
The three field umpires (those umpires who control the flow of the game, as opposed to goal or boundary umpires) confer after each match and award three votes, two votes, and one vote to the players they regard as the best, second-best and third-best in the match, respectively. The votes are kept secret until the awards night, and they are read and tallied on the evening.

=== Illegal betting ===
Several raids and arrests, including that of second-year field umpire Michael Pell, were made in November 2022 after suspicious betting patterns in spot bets on the votes from many games Pell had umpired were investigated by sports corruption police. By the following year, Pell was no longer employed by the AFL; and in 2025, charges were laid against Pell and three other involved men, alleging that Pell had leaked votes he was involved with in both 2021 and 2022, upon which the charged men then placed spot bets. The first accomplice, William Forde, pleaded guilty and was sentenced to an 18-month community corrections order with 250 hours of unpaid community work; the cases of Pell and the other two accomplices remain open as of May 2026.
