= Jai Newcombe =

Australian rules football player

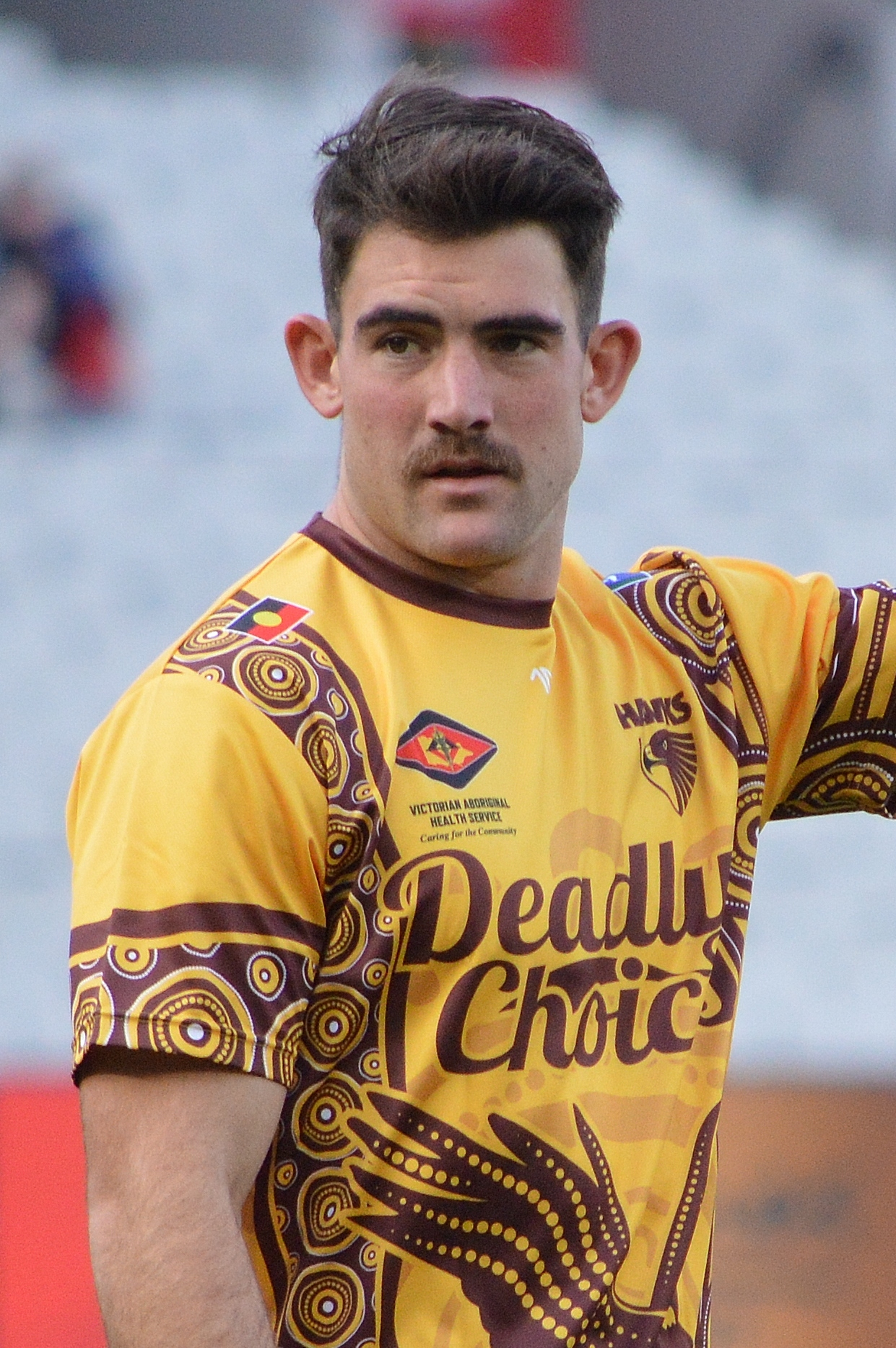
- Newcombe in May 2026

Personal information
- Full name: Jai Newcombe
- Nicknames: Poowong Punisher, Newc
- Born: 2 August 2001 (age 25)
- Original team: Poowong (EDFL)/Box Hill Hawks (VFL)
- Draft: No. 2, 2021 mid-season rookie draft
- Debut: Round 13, 2021, Hawthorn vs. Sydney, at Sydney Cricket Ground
- Height: 187 cm (6 ft 2 in)
- Weight: 92 kg (203 lb)
- Position: Midfielder

Club information
- Current club: Hawthorn
- Number: 3

Playing career^{1}
| Years | Club | Games (Goals) |
| 2021– | Hawthorn | 127 (51) |
- ^{1} Playing statistics correct to the end of 2026.

Career highlights
- Hawthorn co-captain: 2026–; Peter Crimmins Medal: 2024; AFLCA Best Young Player: 2022; 22under22team: 2023 (vc); VFL Team of the Year: 2021

Jai Newcombe (born 2 August 2001) is a professional Australian rules footballer who plays for and co-captains the Hawthorn Football Club in the Australian Football League (AFL).

== Early career ==
Newcombe grew up in the small rural town of Poowong in Southern Gippsland, and attended the nearby Drouin Secondary College. He participated in the Auskick program at Poowong and playing junior football for the Poowong Magpies in the Ellinbank & District Football League. Newcombe was unable to secure a place in the Gippsland Power squads at ages 16, 17 and 18. He made the team in 2020 but due to the COVID-19 pandemic was unable to play a game.

Newcombe's AFL career started at the Hawthorn affiliate Box Hill Hawks in the Victorian Football League (VFL). He played a practice match for Box Hill at the start of 2020 and was asked to return in November after Melbourne was released from lockdown. He made the long commute twice a week from Warragul, where he was working, to training at Box Hill.

== AFL career ==
Newcombe was selected with pick two in the 2021 mid-season draft, having caught the eye of recruiters after an impressive campaign with the Box Hill Hawks across the first half of the 2021 VFL season. The following week, Newcombe made his AFL debut against the Swans, setting an AFL record for the most tackles in a debut match, with 14.

In January 2026, Newcombe was appointed Hawthorn's co-captain alongside his teammate James Sicily.

== Statistics ==
Updated to the end of 2026.

Legend
| G | Goals | K | Kicks | D | Disposals | T | Tackles |
| B | Behinds | H | Handballs | M | Marks |

| Season | Team | No. | Games | Totals | | | | | | | Averages (per game) | | | | | | | Votes |
| Season | Team | No. | Games | G | B | K | H | D | M | T | G | B | K | H | D | M | T | Votes |
|---|---|---|---|---|---|---|---|---|---|---|---|---|---|---|---|---|---|---|
| 2021 | Hawthorn | 44 | 7 | 1 | 1 | 32 | 30 | 62 | 17 | 39 | 0.1 | 0.1 | 4.6 | 4.3 | 8.9 | 2.4 | 5.6 | 0 |
| 2022 | Hawthorn | 44 | 22 | 8 | 6 | 266 | 230 | 496 | 94 | 101 | 0.4 | 0.3 | 12.1 | 10.5 | 22.5 | 4.3 | 4.6 | 11 |
| 2023 | Hawthorn | 3 | 22 | 12 | 8 | 244 | 309 | 553 | 100 | 94 | 0.5 | 0.4 | 11.1 | 14.0 | 25.1 | 4.5 | 4.3 | 18 |
| 2024 | Hawthorn | 3 | 25 | 11 | 4 | 262 | 357 | 619 | 97 | 111 | 0.4 | 0.2 | 10.5 | 14.3 | 24.8 | 3.9 | 4.4 | 24 |
| 2025 | Hawthorn | 3 | 26 | 11 | 9 | 265 | 331 | 596 | 91 | 127 | 0.4 | 0.3 | 10.2 | 12.7 | 22.9 | 3.5 | 4.9 | 17 |
| 2026 | Hawthorn | 3 | 25 | 8 | 10 | 298 | 340 | 638 | 79 | 102 | 0.3 | 0.4 | 11.9 | 13.6 | 25.5 | 3.2 | 4.1 | 21 |
| Career | | | 127 | 51 | 38 | 1367 | 1597 | 2964 | 478 | 574 | 0.4 | 0.3 | 10.8 | 12.6 | 23.3 | 3.8 | 4.5 | 91 |

== Honours and achievements ==
Team

- McClelland Trophy (Hawthorn): 2024

Individual

- AFLCA best young player: 2022
- Hawthorn captain: 2026–
- Peter Crimmins Medal: 2024
- 22under22 team: 2023
- AFL Rising Star nominee: 2022
- VFL Team of the Year: 2021
