= John Barker (Australian footballer) =

Australian rules footballer (born 1975)

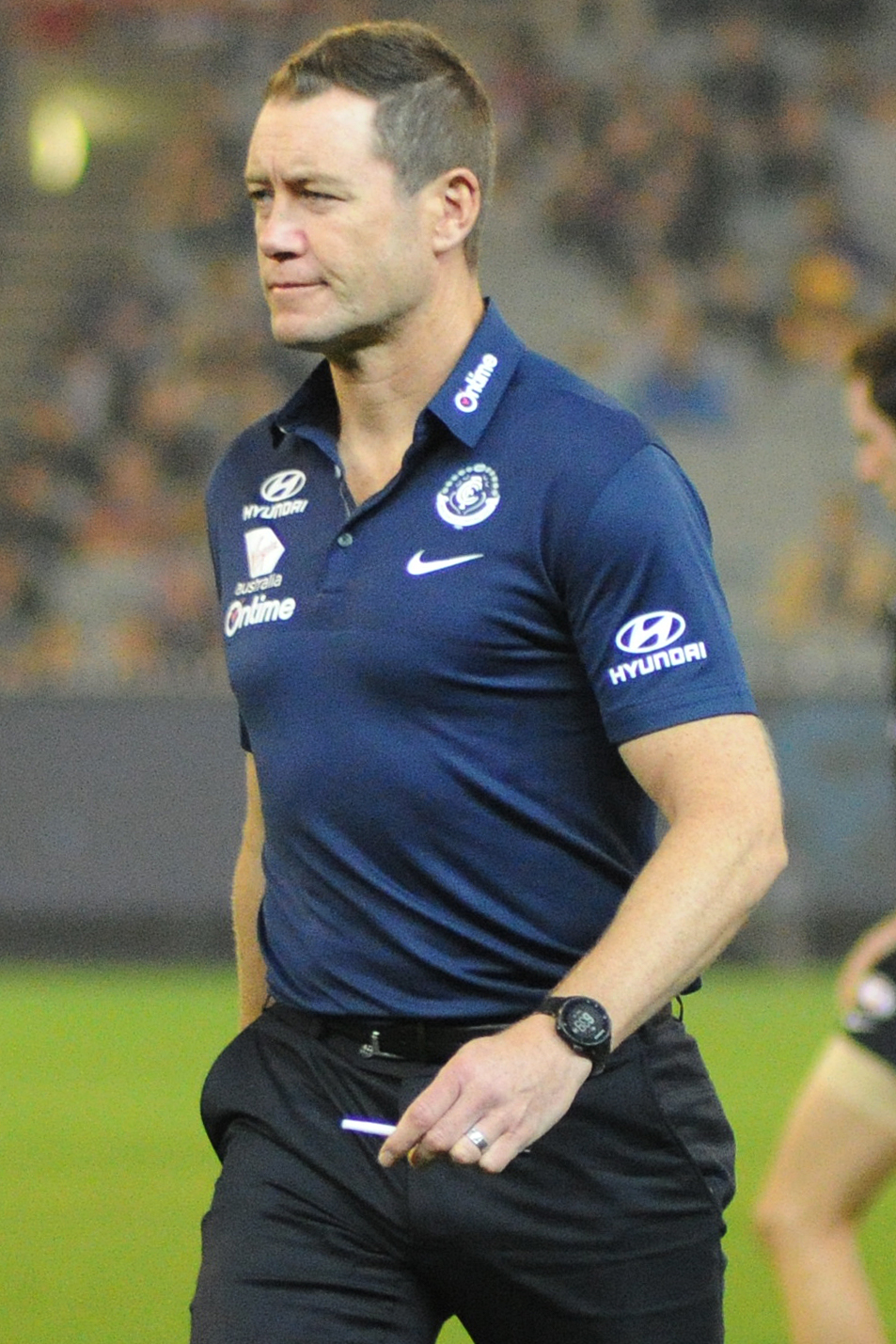
- Barker with Carlton in April 2018

Personal information
- Born: 19 February 1975 (age 51)
- Original team: Northern Knights (VSFL Under 18s)
- Debut: Round 2, 2 April 1994, Fitzroy vs. Essendon, at Princes Park
- Height: 194 cm (6 ft 4 in)
- Weight: 93 kg (205 lb)

Playing career^{1}
Years	Club	Games (Goals)
1994–1996	Fitzroy	47 (12)
1997	Brisbane Lions	8 (1)
1998–2006	Hawthorn	113 (114)
Total		168 (127)

Coaching career^{3}
Years	Club	Games (W–L–D)
2015	Carlton	14 (3–11–0)
- ^{1} Playing statistics correct to the end of 2006.^{3} Coaching statistics correct as of 2015.

Career highlights
- AFL Rising Star nominee 1994; Hawthorn leading Goalkicker 2001; Hawthorn equal 3rd Best and Fairest 2001

John Barker (born 19 February 1975) is a former professional Australian rules footballer who played for the Fitzroy Football Club, Brisbane Lions and Hawthorn Football Club in the Australian Football League (AFL).

== Early life ==
John Barker was born on 19 February 1975. Barker played junior football for Pascoe Vale in the Essendon District Football League. Here Barker played in the 1991 Under 16 premiership winning team. In 1992 Barker played for the Northern Knights in the first season of the VSFL under 18 competition. Barker also represented Vic Metro (Metropolitan Victoria) in the Teal Cup and was named at centre half forward for the Victorian Under 18 All-Star team. Barkers' form at Under 18 level attracted plenty of interest from AFL club scouts. In the 1992 AFL draft John Barker was selected at pick 25 by the Fitzroy Football Club.

== AFL playing career ==
=== Fitzroy ===
Barker did not play a senior game for Fitzroy in 1993 and missed most of the season due to back and hamstring injuries. Barker's first senior game in the AFL was in round 2 of the 1994 season against Essendon at Princes Park. Barker played 47 games and kicked 12 goals at Fitzroy over his 3 seasons at the club. During the 1994 AFL season Barker's talent was noticed and as a result he picked up an AFL Rising Star award nomination. Barker was one of eight players to transfer to Brisbane when Fitzroy's AFL operations were taken over by the Brisbane Bears to form the Brisbane Lions.

=== Brisbane Lions ===
In Barker's only year at the Brisbane Lions, the 1997 season, he managed just 8 games and only 1 goal. At the end of the season Barker and teammate Nathan Chapman were traded to Hawthorn in exchange for Brad Scott.

=== Hawthorn ===
After two seasons at Hawthorn Barker's AFL career looked over, but in round 3 of the 2000 AFL season, John Barker made his mark as an AFL footballer. Barker kicked 4 goals and took some clean one-grab marks to help the hawks come from behind to beat the Brisbane Lions in a thriller (Hawthorn 16 14 110 def. Brisbane Lions 15 13 103).

Barker's time at Hawthorn saw him become the key option up forward during the 2000, '01 and '02 seasons.

John Barker may best be remembered for his remarkable two goals during the 2001 semi final against Port Adelaide. One from Football Parks "dead pocket" which put the hawks within four points. Then the next with only two minutes remaining, the goal which will long live in the minds of Hawks fans for years to come. Barker was a key part of the Hawks' 2001 season which saw them make their way to a preliminary final. Barker won the club's goal kicking award in 2001 with 47 goals and was equal 3rd in the Best and Fairest.

From mid-2002 Barker suffered numerous injuries and struggled to get back to top form. From this point he played most of his football recovering from injuries and proving his fitness with the Box Hill Hawks(Hawthorn Reserves) in an attempt to play at senior level again.

2006 would be John Barkers final year as an AFL footballer and he could just manage 7 games due to on-going shoulder and hamstring injuries. In the week leading up to round 20 of the '06 season Barker announced his retirement, saying his body could no longer stand up to AFL football. In the lead up to the final game of the season several Hawthorn players offered to give up their spot in the side to see that Barker could play a farewell game. Barker kicked 1 goal in the 61 point win against Geelong.

== AFL coaching career ==
=== St Kilda Football Club ===
After Barker announced his retirement, Hawthorn senior coach Alastair Clarkson said the club was keen to retain Barker for 2007, possibly in a coaching role. Just weeks later, Barker was appointed as assistant coach in the position of the forward line coach for the St Kilda Football Club on a two-year deal under St. Kilda senior coach Ross Lyon who had played together with Barker at Fitzroy and Lyon believed Barker had a lot to offer as a coach. Barker served as assistant coach of St Kilda in the 2007 season and 2008 season.

=== Hawthorn Football Club ===
After two years at St. Kilda, Barker was then offered an assistant coaching role at Hawthorn Football Club and jumped at the chance to return to the club he called home for nine years as a player. Barker was the assistant coach in the position of forward line coach at Hawthorn under senior coach Alastair Clarkson for the 2009 season and 2010 season.

=== Carlton Football Club ===
Barker went to be an assistant coach at the Carlton Football Club since the 2011 season. On 26 May 2015, following the mid-season sacking of Mick Malthouse as senior coach of Carlton, Barker was appointed caretaker senior coach of the Carlton Football Club until the end of the 2015 season. He coached the club to three wins from the final fourteen matches, and was one of the front-runners for the senior coaching role before it eventually went to Brendon Bolton, therefore Barker was not retained as senior coach of Carlton at the end of the 2015 season. Barker, however still remained at the Carlton Football Club as an assistant coach in the position of stoppages coach.

Barker departed the Carlton Football Club in the middle of the 2021 season, amid an external review the club had decided to undertake, to improve its on-field results. Fellow Carlton Football Club assistant coach Luke Power who was serving in the assistant coaching position of Head of Development, then replaced Barker in the role of the assistant coaching position of stoppages coach, therefore Power was promoted to a higher assistant coaching position within the Carlton Football Club.

Barker in his ten year tenure as Carlton assistant coach served under senior coaches Brett Ratten, Mick Malthouse, Brendon Bolton and David Teague.
