= 2021 Carlton Football Club season =

Carlton Football Club
2021 season
- President: Mark LoGiudice; Luke Sayers
- Coach: David Teague
- Captain: Patrick Cripps; Sam Docherty
- Home ground: Melbourne Cricket Ground (Training and administrative: Ikon Park)
- AFL season: 13th (8–14)
- AFL Women's: 7th (5–4)
- Leading goalkicker: Harry McKay (58); Darcy Vescio (16)
- Club membership: 81,302

The 2021 Carlton Football Club season was the Carlton Football Club's 158th season of competition.

It was the club's men's team's 125th season as a member of the Australian Football League. The team finished 13th out of eighteen teams with an 8–14 record in the 2021 AFL season – two positions lower than in the 2020 season, ultimately resulting in the sacking of coach David Teague at the end of the season.

It was the club's women's team's fifth season as a member of the AFL Women's competition. The team narrowly missed the finals for the 2021 AFL Women's season, finishing 7th with a record of 5–4.

Individually, Carlton players won the leading goalkicker awards in both the men's and women's senior competitions: Harry McKay winning the Coleman Medal with 58 goals, and Darcy Vescio winning their second leading goalkicker award with 16 goals.

The club also fielded its men's reserves team in the Victorian Football League for the first time since 2002, and fielded a women's team in the VFL Women's competition.

== Club summary ==
The 2021 AFL season will be the 125th season of the VFL/AFL competition since its inception in 1897; and, having competed in every season, it will also be the 125th season contested by the Carlton Football Club.

Contractually, Carlton's primary home ground will continue to be the Melbourne Cricket Ground, with many games also to have been played at Marvel Stadium, and traditional home ground Ikon Park to serve as the training and administrative base. The club fielded its women's team in the fifth season of the AFL Women's competition, and Ikon Park served as the home ground for AFL Women's matches. Restrictions associated with the ongoing COVID-19 pandemic meant that crowds were often restricted to well short of the grounds' maximum capacities.

Carlton terminated its alignment with the Northern Blues in the Victorian Football League in March 2020 as a cost-saving measure during the coronavirus pandemic; and will re-establish its reserves team for the first time since 2002, which will contest its fourth overall season in the VFL.

Car manufacturer Hyundai, which had been a major sponsor of the club continuously since 2008, continued its partnership with the club through the season. Airline Virgin Australia, which had upgraded from a secondary sponsor to a major sponsor during the 2017 season, but was struggling owing to the Covid-19 pandemic, continued as the second major sponsor until mid-season; they were then replaced as major sponsor by Great Southern Bank (just recently rebranded from Credit Union Australia), who took on the major co-partner role in a three-year deal.

For the fourth consecutive season, the club set a new membership record, surpassing the 2020 total of 67,035 members on 1 February, and finishing with 81,302 members. The club became debt-free for the first time since financing the construction of Ikon Park's Legends' Stand in 1996, having cleared $7 million in debt since 2017, despite the impact of the COVID-19 pandemic. The club also ceased to accept financial assistance from the AFL.

== Impact of the COVID-19 pandemic ==
The season was played during the second year of the COVID-19 pandemic. As the season began, Australia had largely settled into a paradigm of most states maintaining zero COVID-19 cases outside of their international travel quarantine systems; this allowed football games to be played in front of crowds, usually with reduced capacity, and unhindered interstate travel was permitted without quarantine. However, the different state governments often responded quickly to small numbers or even single virus cases being discovered in the community; this meant border restrictions or quarantine periods were at times re-introduced at short notice, impacting interstate travel for games; and, in some cases, that city- or state-wide lockdowns could be imposed within the impacted states, precluding football activities altogether.

Direct, short notice impact to Carlton's senior seasons as a result of the pandemic were:

- During the Victorian 13–17 February snap lockdown, the women's team's Round 3 match was closed to spectators at one day's notice;
- During the Victorian snap lockdown which began on 28 May, the men's team's departed Victoria three days ahead of its normal schedule for its Round 11 match against Sydney in Sydney; the team then remained in Sydney for the following week and played its Round 12 home game there at the neutral Sydney Cricket Ground against West Coast instead of at the Melbourne Cricket Ground.
- As a result of Perth becoming a hot zone in late June, the men's team's away game against Fremantle was played at the Melbourne Cricket Ground.
- Lockdowns and ongoing restrictions in Victoria saw men's matches from Round 18 onwards closed to spectators.

== Senior personnel ==
Mark Lo Giudice continued in his final season as club president, a role he had held for a total of almost eight years since mid-2014. Lo Giudice's replacement, club director and former PriceWaterhouseCoopers CEO Luke Sayers, was announced in April with the pair to prepare for the transition during the year. As part of the transition, and in response to the club's weaker than expected start to the season, Lo Giudice commissioned a review of the club's football department, which was conducted by Sayers, CEO Cain Liddle, and external panel members Matthew Pavlich, Geoff Walsh and Graham Lowe, from which followed substantial changes to the club's administration and football department in 2021. Sayers officially took over on August 17, 2021, one round before the end of the season.

David Teague continued in his second full season as appointed senior coach, having also served a half-season as caretaker in 2019. The coaching panel was reduced in size as a result of seeking cost savings and meeting the AFL's soft spending cap due to the coronavirus pandemic, which saw head of coaching performance Henry Playfair, former Northern Blues senior head coach Josh Fraser, development coach Jason Davenport, and specialist coaches Saverio Rocca, Hamish McIntosh and Greg Williams were all made redundant. Added to the club's coaching panel in the new development role as leader of the Carlton College of Sport Development Program and Carlton Academy coach was former Western Jets and Hawthorn development coach Torin Baker. Long serving assistant coach John Barker, who had also served as caretaker senior coach for part of the 2015 season, departed the club in June after 10½ years, a few months earlier than his originally planned departure at the end of the season.

== Squad for 2021 ==
The following is Carlton's squad for the 2021 season.

Statistics are correct as of end of 2020 season. Flags represent the state of origin, i.e. the state in which the player played his Under-18s football.

Senior List
No.	State	Player	Age	AFL Debut	Recruited from	Career (to end 2020)		2021 Player Statistics
No.	State	Player	Age	AFL Debut	Recruited from	Gms	Gls	Gms	Gls	B	D	K	HB	M	T	HO
1	(Victoria (state))	Jack Silvagni	23	2016	Oakleigh (U18)	63	47	15	9	13	200	130	70	70	38	17
2	(Victoria (state))	Paddy Dow	21	2018	Bendigo (U18)	42	15	17	4	2	242	95	147	28	39	0
3	(Victoria (state))	Marc Murphy (lg)	33	2006	Oakleigh (U18)	285	189	15	8	4	191	115	76	47	24	0
4	(Victoria (state))	Lochie O'Brien	21	2018	Bendigo (U18)	36	10	5	1	3	80	49	31	20	9	0
5	(Western Australia)	Sam Petrevski-Seton	22	2017	Claremont	80	19	14	1	3	198	134	64	56	26	0
6	(New South Wales)	Zac Williams	26	2013	GWS Academy, GWS	113	27	14	5	4	264	201	63	55	54	0
8	(Victoria (state))	Lachie Fogarty	21	2018	Western (U18), Geelong	23	6	17	6	6	246	139	107	57	62	0
9	(Western Australia)	Patrick Cripps (c)	25	2014	East Fremantle	118	54	20	13	11	468	163	305	63	85	3
10	(Victoria (state))	Harry McKay	23	2017	Gippsland (U18)	48	71	19	58	33	185	154	31	113	27	6
11	(Western Australia)	Mitch McGovern	26	2016	Claremont, Adelaide	76	98	5	6	4	56	42	14	24	13	0
12	(Victoria (state))	Tom de Koning	21	2018	Dandenong (U18)	9	1	13	7	4	123	81	42	40	27	219
13	(Victoria (state))	Liam Stocker	20	2019	Sandringham (U18)	5	0	17	2	1	238	163	75	58	37	0
14	(Tasmania)	Liam Jones (lg)	29	2010	North Hobart, Western Bulldogs	142	84	19	0	1	219	178	41	105	19	0
15	(Victoria (state))	Sam Docherty (c)	27	2013	Gippsland (U18), Brisbane Lions	108	14	14	0	0	340	252	88	107	31	0
16	(Western Australia)	Jack Carroll	18	–	East Fremantle	–	–	–	–	–	–	–	–	–	–	–
17	(Victoria (state))	Brodie Kemp	19	2021	Bendigo (U18)	–	–	2	0	0	19	14	5	8	3	0
18	(Victoria (state))	Sam Walsh (lg)	20	2019	Geelong (U18)	39	14	22	12	6	656	298	358	127	100	0
20	(Victoria (state))	Lachie Plowman	26	2013	Calder (U18), GWS	110	1	19	1	0	219	160	59	85	20	0
21	(Western Australia)	Jack Martin	25	2014	Claremont, Gold Coast	112	93	11	8	6	140	94	46	61	26	0
22	(Victoria (state))	Caleb Marchbank	24	2015	Murray (U18), GWS	48	0	–	–	–	–	–	–	–	–	–
23	(Victoria (state))	Jacob Weitering (lg)	23	2016	Dandenong (U18)	93	10	22	0	1	361	301	60	167	29	2
24	(Victoria (state))	Nic Newman	27	2017	Frankston, Sydney	53	14	14	0	1	275	199	76	86	54	0
25	(Western Australia)	Zac Fisher	22	2017	Perth	63	27	10	4	8	159	85	74	23	24	0
27	(Victoria (state))	Marc Pittonet	24	2016	Oakleigh (U18), Hawthorn	20	0	13	5	5	147	67	80	26	28	379
28	(Victoria (state))	David Cuningham	23	2016	Oakleigh (U18)	37	20	4	1	0	54	26	28	9	6	0
29	(South Australia)	Corey Durdin	18	2021	Central District	–	–	2	1	0	8	4	4	2	4	0
30	(Victoria (state))	Charlie Curnow	23	2016	Geelong (U18)	58	77	4	2	5	49	35	14	16	6	0
31	(Victoria (state))	Tom Williamson	23	2017	North Ballarat (U18)	32	2	11	2	3	124	83	41	43	16	0
32	(Victoria (state))	Jack Newnes	27	2012	Northern (U18)	172	68	19	4	9	312	188	124	93	34	0
33	(Victoria (state))	Sam Ramsay	19	—	Calder (U18)	–	–	–	–	–	–	–	–	–	–	–
34	(Victoria (state))	Sam Philp	19	2020	Northern (U18)	2	1	–	–	–	–	–	–	–	–	–
35	(Victoria (state))	Ed Curnow (lg)	31	2011	Geelong (U18), Adelaide, Box Hill	182	40	22	10	3	496	318	178	106	80	0
40	(Victoria (state))	Michael Gibbons	25	2019	Williamstown	36	27	11	8	5	156	98	58	39	27	0
41	(Victoria (state))	Levi Casboult	30	2012	Dandenong (U18)	141	148	13	8	5	111	77	34	47	25	79
42	(Victoria (state))	Adam Saad	26	2015	Calder (U18), Coburg, Gold Coast, Essendon	109	8	22	2	6	424	311	113	72	39	0
43	(Victoria (state))	Will Setterfield	22	2017	Sandringham (U18), GWS	36	10	8	1	6	124	74	50	35	17	0
Rookie List
No.	State	Player	Age	AFL Debut	Recruited from	Career (to end 2020)		2021 Player Statistics
No.	State	Player	Age	AFL Debut	Recruited from	Gms	Gls	Gms	Gls	B	D	K	HB	M	T	HO
7	(New South Wales)	Matthew Kennedy	23	2016	Collingullie-Glenfield Park, GWS	48	23	13	6	2	239	138	101	60	54	0
19	(Victoria (state))	Eddie Betts	34	2005	Calder (U18), Adelaide	331	613	19	27	16	180	121	59	42	31	0
26	(New South Wales)	Luke Parks	19	2021	Sydney Academy, Glenelg	–	–	6	0	0	45	30	15	12	12	0
36	(Victoria (state))	Josh Honey	19	2020	Western (U18)	1	0	5	6	3	36	24	12	13	6	0
37	(Victoria (state))	Jordan Boyd	22	–	Western (U18), Footscray reserves	–	–	–	–	–	–	–	–	–	–	–
39	(Victoria (state))	Oscar McDonald	24	2015	North Ballarat (U18), Melbourne	81	1	3	2	1	9	8	1	3	2	0
44	(Victoria (state))	Matthew Owies	23	2020	St Kevin's, Seattle Redhawks	1	0	13	15	17	115	69	46	43	38	0
45	(Victoria (state))	Alex Mirkov	21	–	Carlton reserves	–	–	–	–	–	–	–	–	–	–	–
46	(Victoria (state))	Matthew Cottrell	20	2020	Dandenong (U18)	5	2	14	3	2	165	118	47	37	31	0
Senior coaching panel
	State	Coach	Coaching position				Carlton Coaching debut		Former clubs as coach
	(Victoria (state))	David Teague	Senior coach				2008		Carlton (d), Northern Bullants (s), West Coast (a), St Kilda (a), Adelaide (a)
	(Victoria (state))	Luke Power	Head of development Assistant coach (stoppages)(from Round 12)				2020		GWS (a), AFL Academy Manager
	(Victoria (state))	John Barker (until Round 12)	Assistant coach (stoppages)				2011		St Kilda (a), Hawthorn (a)
	(Victoria (state))	Cameron Bruce	Assistant coach (forward)				2018		Hawthorn (a)
	(Victoria (state))	Dale Amos	Assistant coach (defence)				2016		South Barwon (s), Geelong (a), Geelong reserves (s)
	(Victoria (state))	Daniel O'Keefe	Development coach (Midfield), Reserves coach				2020		Geelong Falcons (s), Geelong reserves (a)
	(Victoria (state))	Brent Stanton	Development coach (Midfield and transition)				2018
	(Victoria (state))	Torin Baker	Carlton College of Sport and Academy coach				2021		Western Jets (s), Hawthorn (d)

- For players: (c) denotes captain, (vc) denotes vice-captain, (dvc) denotes deputy vice-captain, (lg) denotes leadership group.
- For coaches: (s) denotes senior coach, (cs) denotes caretaker senior coach, (a) denotes assistant coach, (d) denotes development coach, (m) denotes managerial or administrative role in a football or coaching department

== Playing list changes ==
The following summarises all player changes which occurred after the 2020 season. Unless otherwise noted, draft picks refer to selections in the 2020 National Draft.

The club lost two of its four most experienced players to retirement at the end of 2020: Kade Simpson retired after 18 seasons and 342 games, the third most in club history; and Matthew Kreuzer retired after 13 seasons and 189 games, having missed all but the first match in 2020 with injury.

=== In ===
Player	Former Club	League	via
(New South Wales) Zac Williams	GWS	AFL	Restricted free agent signing; GWS received a first round draft pick as compensation.
(Victoria (state)) Lachie Fogarty	Geelong	AFL	AFL trade period, received along with a second-round draft selection (provisionally No. 38), in exchange for a higher second-round draft selection and a third-round draft selection (provisionally No. 30 and 51 respectively)
(Victoria (state)) Adam Saad	Essendon	AFL	AFL trade period, received along with a third-round draft selection and a fourth-round draft selection (provisionally No. 48 and 78), in exchange for a first-round draft selection and a fifth-round draft selection (provisionally No. 8 and 87)
(South Australia) Corey Durdin	Central District	SANFL	AFL National Draft, second round selection (No. 37 overall)
(Western Australia) Jack Carroll	East Fremantle	WAFL	AFL National Draft, second round selection (No. 41 overall)
(New South Wales) Luke Parks	Glenelg	SANFL	AFL Rookie Draft, first round selection (No. 8 overall)
(Victoria (state)) Oscar McDonald	Melbourne	AFL	Pre-season supplemental selection period.
(Victoria (state)) Alex Mirkov	Carlton reserves	VFL	Mid-season draft, first round selection (No. 6 overall).
(Victoria (state)) Jordan Boyd	Footscray reserves	VFL	Mid-season draft, second round selection (No. 20 overall).

=== Out ===
Player	New Club	League	via
(Victoria (state)) Matthew Kreuzer			Retired
(Victoria (state)) Kade Simpson			Retired
(Victoria (state)) Darcy Lang	Waratah	NTFL	Delisted after the season
(Victoria (state)) Ben Silvagni	Northern Bullants	VFL	Delisted after the season
(Victoria (state)) Finbar O'Dwyer	Northern Bullants	VFL	Delisted after the season
(Victoria (state)) Hugh Goddard	University Blues	VAFA	Delisted from the rookie list after the season
(New South Wales) Harrison Macreadie	Williamstown	VFL	Delisted after the trade period
(Victoria (state)) Cameron Polson	Williamstown	VFL	Delisted after the trade period
(Victoria (state)) Fraser Phillips	Carlton reserves	VFL	Delisted from the rookie list after the trade period
(Victoria (state)) Callum Moore	Wangaratta	O&MFL	Delisted from the rookie list after the trade period. He remained on the club's train-on list through the offseason but was not recruited back to the senior list afterwards.

=== List management ===
Player	Change
(Victoria (state)) Michael Gibbons	Elevated from the rookie list to the senior list.
(New South Wales) Matthew Kennedy	Demoted from the senior list to the rookie list.
(Victoria (state)) Eddie Betts	Demoted from the senior list to the rookie list.
(Victoria (state)) Zavier Maher (Victoria (state)) Oscar McDonald (Victoria (state)) Callum Moore	All three players received permission to train with Carlton during the 2021 pre-season ahead of the supplemental selection period; McDonald was ultimately added to the club's list.

== Season summary ==
=== Pre-season ===
The club played two full-length practice matches in the lead-up to the season. The match against St Kilda was scheduled as part of the 2021 AAMI Community Series, and the match against Essendon was arranged between the clubs and played behind closed doors but was live streamed on the club website.

**Date and local time**	**Opponent**	**Scores** (Carlton's scores indicated in **bold**)			**Venue**	**Attendance**
**Date and local time**	**Opponent**	Home	Away	Result	**Venue**	**Attendance**
Thursday, 25 February (11:00 am)	Essendon	**14.11 (95)**	11.8 (74)	Won by 21 points	Ikon Park (H)	Closed
Thursday, 4 March (7:10 pm)	St Kilda	**15.9 (99)**	19.11 (125)	Lost by 26 points	Marvel Stadium (H)	10,228

=== Premiership season ===
Following improvements to 11th place under Teague in 2020, Carlton was expected to continue its improvement in 2021 and at the start of the season was considered an outside chance of playing finals. The first half of the season prior to the midseason bye fell short of those expectations, with the clubs sitting 14th with a 4–8 record – avoiding any big losses with a heaviest defeat of only 28 points, but also unable to record any victories against top eight opponents – the closest chance coming against the Western Bulldogs in Round 8, when the team led by 27 points in the third quarter before conceding eight consecutive goals and losing by 16 points. During the mid-season bye, the club's football department review was announced. The second half of the season proceeded similarly, with a 4–6 from the last ten games, but suffering more heavy defeats including a 95-point loss to Port Adelaide in Round 22, the club's heaviest loss since 2018. The club still maintained a mathematical chance of making finals until Round 22, but ultimately finished 13th with an 8–14 record.

Carlton's formline was erratic. The club had a 0–9 record against the top seven teams. It was 4–2 against the teams placed between 8th and 12th, with its Round 7 win against eighth-placed Essendon serving as its highest placed defeated opponent for the year. Against teams placed 14th to 18th, Carlton's record was only 4–3, suffering one loss against each of the bottom three teams (Gold Coast, Collingwood and North Melbourne).

Season

**Rd**	**Date and local time**	**Opponent**	**Scores** (Carlton's scores indicated in **bold**)			**Venue**	**Attendance**	**Ladder**
**Rd**	**Date and local time**	**Opponent**	Home	Away	Result	**Venue**	**Attendance**	**Ladder**
1	Thursday, 18 March (7:25 pm)	Richmond	15.15 (105)	**11.14 (80)**	Lost by 25 points	Melbourne Cricket Ground (A)	49,218	14th
2	Thursday, 25 March (7:20 pm)	Collingwood	**13.7 (85)**	16.10 (106)	Lost by 21 points	Melbourne Cricket Ground (H)	51,723	15th
3	Sunday, 4 April (3:20 pm)	Fremantle	**16.13 (109)**	9.10 (64)	Won by 45 points	Marvel Stadium (H)	24,551	12th
4	Saturday, 10 April (7:25 pm)	Gold Coast	8.11 (59)	**9.16 (70)**	Won by 11 points	Metricon Stadium (A)	11,618	7th
5	Saturday, 17 April (7:25 pm)	Port Adelaide	**9.14 (68)**	14.12 (96)	Lost by 28 points	Melbourne Cricket Ground (H)	32,893	11th
6	Saturday, 24 April (4:35 pm)	Brisbane	**12.13 (85)**	15.13 (103)	Lost by 18 points	Marvel Stadium (H)	29,576	13th
7	Sunday, 2 May (3:20 pm)	Essendon	16.11 (107)	**19.9 (123)**	Won by 16 points	Melbourne Cricket Ground (A)	57,447	12th
8	Sunday, 9 May (3:20pm)	Western Bulldogs	16.11 (107)	**13.13 (91)**	Lost by 16 points	Marvel Stadium (A)	27,663	13th
9	Sunday, 16 May (3:20pm)	Melbourne	13.16 (94)	**10.8 (68)**	Lost by 26 points	Melbourne Cricket Ground (A)	38,581	13th
10	Saturday, 22 May (1:45pm)	Hawthorn	**13.8 (86)**	9.9 (63)	Won by 23 points	Melbourne Cricket Ground (H)	45,741	12th
11	Sunday, 30 May (3:20pm)	Sydney	15.10 (100)	**11.12 (78)**	Lost by 22 points	Sydney Cricket Ground (A)	29,822	13th
12	Sunday, 6 June (3:20pm)	West Coast	**10.13 (73)**	14.11 (95)	Lost by 22 points	Sydney Cricket Ground (H)	5,137	14th
13	Bye							14th
14	Saturday, 19 June (7:25 pm)	GWS	16.6 (102)	**9.12 (66)**	Lost by 36 points	GIANTS Stadium (A)	7,035	14th
15	Sunday, 27 June (4:10 pm)	Adelaide	**12.11 (83)**	10.13 (73)	Won by 10 points	Marvel Stadium (H)	14,930	13th
16	Saturday, 3 July (7:40 pm)	Fremantle	8.16 (64)	**12.8 (80)**	Won by 16 points	Melbourne Cricket Ground (A)	12,103	13th
17	Saturday, 10 July (4:35pm)	Geelong	**5.14 (44)**	10.10 (70)	Lost by 26 points	Melbourne Cricket Ground (H)	31,834	13th
18	Sunday, 18 July (3:20 pm)	Collingwood	9.8 (62)	**13.13 (91)**	Won by 29 points	Melbourne Cricket Ground (A)	Closed	13th
19	Saturday, 24 July (1:45pm)	North Melbourne	**11.11 (77)**	18.8 (116)	Lost by 39 points	Marvel Stadium (H)	Closed	13th
20	Friday, 30 July (7:50 pm)	St Kilda	12.9 (81)	**18.4 (112)**	Won by 31 points	Marvel Stadium (A)	Closed	12th
21	Saturday, 7 August (1:45pm)	Gold Coast	**8.9 (57)**	11.10 (76)	Lost by 19 points	Marvel Stadium (H)	Closed	13th
22	Saturday, 14 August (4:05pm)	Port Adelaide	21.14 (140)	**5.15 (45)**	Lost by 95 points	Adelaide Oval (A)	13,943	13th
23	Saturday, 21 August (7:40pm)	GWS	**11.9 (75)**	12.17 (89)	Lost by 14 points	Marvel Stadium (H)	Closed	13th

== Individual awards ==
=== John Nicholls Medal ===
The Carlton Football Club Best and Fairest awards night took place on 14 October 2021, taking place as a virtual event due to COVID-19 lockdown restrictions.

John Nicholls Medal

The winner of the John Nicholls Medal was Sam Walsh, who polled 183 votes to win the award for the first time in his career. 2020 winner Jacob Weitering finished second, polling 172 votes; and Harry McKay finished third with 118 votes.

Pos.	Player	Votes
1st	Sam Walsh	183
2nd	Jacob Weitering	172
3rd	Harry McKay	118
4th	Patrick Cripps	112
5th	Ed Curnow	100
6th	Adam Saad	97
7th	Lachie Plowman	86
8th	Liam Jones	80
9th	Eddie Betts	75
10th	Jack Silvagni	71

Other awards

The following other awards were presented on John Nicholls Medal night:-

- Best Young Player – Liam Stocker
- Best Clubman – Marc Pittonet
- Spirit of Carlton Award – Jack Silvagni
- Bill Lanyon Inner Blue Ruthless Award – Sam Walsh
- Carltonians William A. Cook Award – Sam Walsh
- Coaches' Award – Jacob Weitering
- Most Valuable Bluebagger Award – Jacob Weitering

=== Leading goalkickers ===
Harry McKay won both the Coleman Medal as the league's leading goalkicker in the home-and-away season, and Carlton's leading goalkicker, kicking 58 goals. His tally of 58 goals was the most by any Carlton player in a season since Brendan Fevola kicked 89 goals in 2009, which was also club's most recent previous Coleman Medal. It was McKay's first Coleman Medal, and was achieved despite playing only 19 of 22 games. He held a ten-goal lead when his season ended due to injury with two rounds remaining, and ultimately won by four goals from Tom Hawkins (Geelong) on 54 goals.

Small forwards Eddie Betts and Matthew Owies occupied the next two positions – the former in his final season, and the latter in his breakout season – followed by midfielders Patrick Cripps and Sam Walsh.

Player	Goals	Behinds
Harry McKay	58	33
Eddie Betts	27	16
Matthew Owies	15	17
Patrick Cripps	13	11
Sam Walsh	12	6

=== Other awards ===
Honorific teams

- All-Australian team – two Carlton players – Sam Walsh and Harry McKay – were named in the 2021 All-Australian team, both receiving the honour for the first times in their careers. Jacob Weitering was also nominated in the 40-man squad, for the second consecutive year.
- 22under22 team – one Carlton player – Sam Walsh – was named in the 22under22 team for the 2021 season. It was Walsh's third selection, and Walsh was named captain of the team.

AFLCA awards

- Midfield assistant coach Luke Power won the AFLCA Assistant Coach of the Year award.

Statistical leaders

- Adam Saad led the league in running bounces for the season, with 63.

Club records

- Round 22 – Marc Murphy played his 300th (and final) senior game for the club, becoming the sixth player to reach the milestone for Carlton.
- Season - Jacob Weitering set a new club record for most rebounds in a season with 139.
- Season – Sam Walsh polled 30 votes in the Brownlow Medal, tying Greg Williams (1994) and Chris Judd (2010) for the most in a season in club history; unlike Williams and Judd, who each won their respective year, Walsh finished fourth overall and polled the most votes ever by a fourth-placed finisher.

Hall of Fame

- Chris Judd, who played for West Coast from 2002–2007 and for Carlton from 2008–2015, winning a Brownlow Medal with each, was inducted into the Australian Football Hall of Fame.
- Four-time premiership player David McKay, who played for Carlton between 1969 and 1981, was elevated to the status of Legend in the Carlton Football Club Hall of Fame.

== AFL Women's ==
Squad

Most significant among the list changes in the women's team for the 2021 season was the loss of foundation player Sarah Hosking to Richmond, and the acquisition of former Melbourne captain Elise O'Dea – both in trades. The club's highest draft pick, No. 12, went to the recruitment of Mimi Hill.

The club's 2021 squad is given below. The number of games played and goals scored in the 2021 season is given in parentheses.

Carlton Football Club (AFL Women's)
Senior list		Coaching staff
1 Grace Egan (9,0); 2 Katie Loynes (c) (7,1); 3 Darcy Vescio (lg) (9,16); 4 Maddy Prespakis (8,4); 5 Abbie McKay (9,0); 6 Gab Pound (7,1); 7 Tayla Harris (8,4); 8 Vaomua Laloifi (8,0); 9 Kerryn Harrington (c) (9,1); 10 Mimi Hill (6,2); 11 Jess Hosking (9,1); 12 Lauren Brazzale (9,4); 13 Lucy McEvoy (7,2); 14 Brooke Walker (2,2); 15 Chloe Dalton (0,0)	16 Breann Moody (9,1); 17 Charlotte Hammans (3,0); 18 Maddy Guerin (6,0); 19 Georgia Gee (9,4); 20 Charlotte Wilson (8,0); 21 Nicola Stevens (lg) (9,9); 22 Courtney Jones (0,0); 23 Daisy Walker (6,0); 24 Winnie Laing (0,0); 25 Jess Edwards (2,0); 26 Paige Trudgeon (0,0); 30 Alison Downie (lg) (9,1); 31 Brooke Vernon (2,0); 32 Natalie Plane (7,3); 33 Serena Gibbs (3,3); 46 Elise O'Dea (9,3)	**Head coach**: Daniel Harford; Legend: (c) Captain(s); (vc) Vice-captain(s); Updated: Source(s): Senior list, Coaching staff

Season

Despite starting the season as one of the premiership favourites, Carlton underperformed across the 2021 AFLW season to finish seventh with a 5–4 record to miss the top six. Although the team was still in contention for sixth place entering the final round, this relied on a heavy victory and other results falling Carlton's way, which did not occur. Across the entire season, Carlton was 0–4 against top eight clubs – including three losses by a goal or less, two of which occurred in the opening two rounds – and 5–0 against the bottom six.

**Rd**	**Date and local time**	**Opponent**	**Scores** (Carlton's scores indicated in **bold**)			**Venue**	**Attendance**	**Ladder**
**Rd**	**Date and local time**	**Opponent**	Home	Away	Result	**Venue**	**Attendance**	**Ladder**
1	Thursday, 28 January (7:15 pm)	Collingwood	**4.3 (27)**	5.3 (33)	Lost by 6 points	Ikon Park (H)	6,712	9th
2	Friday, 5 February (7:45 pm)	Western Bulldogs	6.6 (42)	**5.6 (33)**	Lost by 6 points	VU Whitten Oval (A)	3,479	9th
3	Saturday, 13 February (5:10 pm)	St Kilda	2.4 (16)	**6.4 (40)**	Won by 24 points	RSEA Park (A)	Closed	8th
4	Saturday, 20 February (3:10 pm)	Richmond	**8.3 (51)**	7.4 (46)	Won by 5 points	Ikon Park (H)	2,212	8th
5	Saturday, 27 February (7:10 pm)	Kangaroos	9.5 (59)	**6.1 (37)**	Lost by 22 points	UTas Stadium (A)	820	8th
6	Sunday, 7 March (12:40 pm)	Geelong	**10.4 (64)**	4.7 (31)	Won by 33 points	Ikon Park (H)	1,764	8th
7	Sunday, 14 March (1:10 pm)	Fremantle	**6.5 (41)**	6.9 (45)	Lost by 4 points	Ikon Park (H)	2,048	8th
8	Friday, 19 March (5:10 pm)	Gold Coast	4.3 (27)	**13.9 (87)**	Won by 60 points	Metricon Stadium (A)	272	7th
9	Sunday, 28 March (4:10 pm)	Greater Western Sydney	4.7 (31)	**4.8 (32)**	Won by 1 point	Blacktown ISP (A)	903	7th

Notable events

- In Round 8 against Gold Coast, Carlton set a new record for the highest score by any team in an AFLW match, 13.9 (87); the score broke the Western Bulldogs' 2018 record of 12.14 (86), and stood until broken in Round 8, 2022. The 60-point winning margin and Darcy Vescio's five goals in the match both set records as the highest in Carlton's AFLW history.

League awards

- Darcy Vescio was the winner of the league's leading goalkicker award, having kicked 16 goals during the home and away season. It was Vescio's second leading goalkicker medal, and their tally of 16 goals broke their own 2017 record of 14 goals in a season.
- Two Carlton players were selected in the 21-player team for the All-Australian team: Darcy Vescio at full forward and Breann Moody in the ruck. Kerryn Harrington and Maddy Prespakis were also part of the original 40-woman squad.

Club Awards

- Darcy Vescio won the club's best and fairest award, polling 66 votes to finish ahead of Nicola Stevens (53 votes) and Kerryn Harrington (49 votes).
- Jess Hosking won the coaches' award for demonstrating club values across the season.
- Mimi Hill won the Best First Year Player award.

== Reserves ==
Carlton fielded reserves teams in the men's and women's competitions during the 2021 season.

=== Men's ===
After having an eighteen season reserves alignment with the Northern Bullants\Blues club in the Victorian Football League, Carlton terminated the agreement in March 2020 as a cost-saving measure during the coronavirus pandemic. In 2021, the club re-established its own reserves team for the first time since 2002. The reserves team contested its fourth VFL season, having previously contested the 2000–2002 seasons; and its 85th overall season of reserves and state level competition dating back to 1919.

Daniel O'Keefe, who had joined the club as a development coach in 2020, took the role as the reserves coach. New players signed to the club's VFL list included former AFL players James Parsons (Geelong), Ben Crocker (Adelaide/Collingwood) and Ryley Stoddart (Sydney); former AFL-listed players Fraser Phillips (Carlton), Tom North (Fremantle), Harry Reynolds (Sydney), Cody Hirst (Sydney), Will Golds (Hawthorn) and Toby Wooller (Brisbane); as well as Alex Cincotta, Daniel Guccione, Cooper Stephens, Stefan Radovanovic, Lachie Potter, Aaron Gundry, Lachie Bond, Edward Delany, Matt Shannon, Dale Marshall, Lachie Swaney, Ben Caluzzi, Lachlan Gawel, Owen King, Zane Barzen, Ben Nikolovski and Alex Mirkov, who was added to the club's senior list during the mid-season draft. Stoddart and Shannon served as co-captains of the team.

In a planned sixteen-game season which was repeatedly interrupted and ultimately curtailed by COVID-19 pandemic-related lockdowns, the team played only nine home-and-away matches for a 4–5 record, finishing 12th out of 22 teams. Ben Crocker, who kicked 29 goals for the year, won the reserves' best and fairest.

=== Women's ===
The club fielded a team in the VFL Women's competition for the third time, after the competition's one-year hiatus in 2020 due to the pandemic. The scheduling of the competition shifted in 2021, now running concurrently with the AFL Women's season rather than after it, meaning that the team will function as a reserves team, rather than a senior team at state level. The team finished eighth out of twelve teams, with a win–loss record of 6–8 to miss the finals by one win and percentage.
