= 2024 Carlton Football Club season =

Carlton Football Club
2024 season
- President: Luke Sayers
- Coach: Michael Voss
- Captain: Patrick Cripps
- Home ground: Marvel Stadium, Melbourne Cricket Ground (Training and administrative: Ikon Park)
- AFL season: 8th (13–10 H&A, 0–1 finals)
- AFL Women's season: 14th (4–7)
- John Nicholls Medal: Patrick Cripps
- Leading goalkicker: Charlie Curnow (57)
- Club membership: 106,345

The 2024 Carlton Football Club season was the Carlton Football Club's 161st season of competition.

It was the club's men's team's 128th season as a member of the Australian Football League, and the third under senior coach Michael Voss. A strong first half of the season which saw Carlton second on the ladder as late as round 20, before a decline in late season form saw Carlton almost miss the final eight, qualifying in eighth with a 13–10 record on the final day of the home-and-away season. Carlton finished eighth overall with an elimination final loss. Captain Patrick Cripps won his second second Brownlow Medal as league best and fairest, polling a record high 45 votes to win the award.

The club's women's team contested its ninth season in the AFL Women's, finishing 14th with a 4–7 record to miss the finals. The club also fielded its men's reserves team in the Victorian Football League and its state level women's team in the VFL Women's, failing to reach the finals in either competition.

== Club summary ==
The 2024 AFL season was the 128th season of the VFL/AFL competition since its inception in 1897; and, having competed in every season, it was also the 128th season contested by the Carlton Football Club. The club fielded its women's team in the ninth season of the AFL Women's competition, and fielded its men's reserves team in its seventh Victorian Football League season, and its VFL women's team in its sixth VFL Women's season.

As in 2023, Carlton's primary home ground was Marvel Stadium and secondary home ground was the Melbourne Cricket Ground, with the team playing six home games at the former and five at the latter. Traditional home ground Ikon Park continued to serve as the training and administrative base, and as the home ground for AFL Women's and the men's reserves matches.

Car manufacturer Hyundai, which had been a major sponsor of the club continuously since 2008, and Great Southern Bank, which became a major sponsor during the 2021 season, continued as the club's major sponsors through the 2024 season; in March, Great Southern Bank signed an extension to its major sponsorship of the club through until the end of 2027. The club set another new club record membership tally for the season, exceeding 2023's record of 95,277 in early April, making it the seventh consecutive season that a new club record membership had been set; the final membership tally was 106,345, the second-highest tally in the league behind only Collingwood. The club returned a statutory profit of $3.0 million, aided by league-high online merchanise sales and a league-high average home attendance of 58,311.

== Senior personnel ==
Luke Sayers continued in his third year as president, Brian Cook in his third year as CEO, and Michael Voss in his third year as senior coach of the club. Prior to the season, Cook and Voss signed contract extensions to remain at the club until the end of 2025 and 2026 respectively. Patrick Cripps continued in his third year as sole club captain and sixth year overall (having served as co-captain with Sam Docherty for three years). The number of vice-captains was increased from two to three to make up the broader leadership group, with Charlie Curnow appointed a new vice captain, and Jacob Weitering and Sam Walsh continuing in the role. The coaching panel was mostly steady from 2023, the only change being former player Jordan Russell joining as the forward line assistant coach, with Ashley Hansen promoted to senior assistant coach.

== Squad for 2024 ==
The following is Carlton's squad for the 2024 season.

Senior List
No.	Player	Age	AFL Debut	Recruited from	Career (to end 2023)		2024 Player Statistics
No.	Player	Age	AFL Debut	Recruited from	Gms	Gls	Gms	Gls	B	D	K	HB	M	T	HO
1	Jack Silvagni	26	2016	Oakleigh (U18)	115	87	–	–	–	–	–	–	–	–	–
2	Lachie Cowan	19	2023	Devonport, Tasmania (U18)	7	0	17	1	1	211	139	72	66	50	0
3	Jesse Motlop	20	2022	South Fremantle	33	36	7	6	4	54	30	24	15	15	0
4	Oliver Hollands	19	2023	Murray (U18)	19	4	23	5	4	322	203	119	87	79	0
5	Adam Cerra	24	2018	Eastern (U18), Fremantle	116	30	13	4	3	252	139	113	32	47	0
6	Zac Williams	29	2013	GWS Academy, GWS	136	32	19	15	7	245	178	67	71	43	0
7	Matthew Kennedy	26	2016	Collingullie-Glenfield Park, GWS	94	41	24	16	10	424	245	179	105	81	12
8	Lachie Fogarty	24	2018	Western (U18), Geelong	55	16	15	9	4	175	94	81	27	45	0
9	Patrick Cripps (c)	28	2014	East Fremantle	183	96	24	17	6	692	266	426	63	129	20
10	Harry McKay	204	2017	Gippsland (U18)	107	203	21	49	21	274	207	67	143	52	30
11	Mitch McGovern	29	2016	Claremont, Adelaide	110	106	18	3	3	298	244	54	85	29	0
12	Tom de Koning	24	2018	Dandenong (U18)	60	21	18	9	10	292	154	138	59	6	359
13	Blake Acres	28	2014	West Perth, St Kilda, Fremantle	145	47	23	13	12	516	293	223	138	34	0
14	Orazio Fantasia	28	2014	Norwood, Essendon, Port Adelaide	99	141	15	9	7	127	68	59	29	22	0
15	Sam Docherty	30	2013	Gippsland (U18), Brisbane Lions	167	25	2	1	0	26	21	5	8	3	0
16	Jack Carroll	21	2022	East Fremantle	6	1	15	4	3	150	83	67	35	22	0
17	Brodie Kemp	22	2021	Bendigo (U18)	23	1	21	6	4	294	195	99	130	46	0
18	Sam Walsh (vc)	23	2019	Geelong (U18)	99	37	20	5	9	568	268	300	60	135	0
19	Corey Durdin	21	2021	Central District	34	27	14	7	5	82	43	39	21	25	0
20	Elijah Hollands	21	2022	Murray (U18), Gold Coast	14	8	22	17	10	391	250	141	100	58	0
21	Jack Martin	28	2014	Claremont, Gold Coast	148	130	3	3	0	20	12	8	7	2	0
22	Caleb Marchbank	27	2015	Murray (U18), GWS	60	0	3	0	0	28	10	18	3	3	0
23	Jacob Weitering (vc)	26	2016	Dandenong (U18)	159	11	22	0	1	313	245	68	142	33	2
24	Nic Newman	30	2017	Frankston, Sydney	110	17	24	1	3	566	413	153	194	92	0
25	Jaxon Binns	19	—	Dandenong (U18)	–	–	3	2	0	36	25	11	6	6	0
27	Marc Pittonet	27	2016	Oakleigh (U18), Hawthorn	59	5	14	5	3	192	96	96	21	21	356
28	David Cuningham	26	2016	Oakleigh (U18)	53	29	5	1	2	39	18	21	7	10	0
29	George Hewett	27	2016	North Adelaide, Sydney	157	39	22	7	1	514	235	279	61	101	0
30	Charlie Curnow	26	2016	Geelong (U18)	110	224	21	57	41	254	214	40	125	20	0
31	Harry Lemmey	19	—	West Adelaide	–	–	–	–	–	–	–	–	–	–	–
33	Lewis Young	24	2017	Sturt, Western Bulldogs	58	2	9	1	1	117	80	37	56	8	5
35	Billy Wilson	18	—	Dandenong (U18)	–	–	–	–	–	–	–	–	–	–	–
42	Adam Saad	29	2015	Calder (U18), Coburg, Gold Coast, Essendon	177	10	18	1	1	330	217	113	70	40	0
43	Ashton Moir	18	—	Glenelg	–	–	2	2	1	8	5	3	3	3	0
44	Matthew Owies	26	2020	St Kevin's, Seattle Redhawks	49	56	23	33	13	199	133	66	67	52	0
46	Matthew Cottrell	23	2020	Dandenong (U18)	54	25	14	9	5	152	100	52	45	27	0
Rookie List
No.	Player	Age	AFL Debut	Recruited from	Career (to end 2023)		2024 Player Statistics
No.	Player	Age	AFL Debut	Recruited from	Gms	Gls	Gms	Gls	B	D	K	HB	M	T	HO
32	Matt Carroll	18	—	Sandringham (U18)	–	–	–	–	–	–	–	–	–	–	–
34	Rob Monahan	19	—	Kerry	–	–	–	–	–	–	–	–	–	–	–
36	Cooper Lord	18	–	Sandringham (U18), North Melbourne reserves	–	–	2	0	1	34	10	24	8	9	0
37	Jordan Boyd	25	2022	Western (U18), Footscray reserves	16	0	19	1	3	262	203	59	77	44	0
38	Sam Durdin	27	2017	West Adelaide, North Melbourne, Glenelg	23	1	1	0	0	5	4	1	1	0	0
39	Alex Cincotta	27	2023	Newtown & Chilwell, Carlton reserves	19	3	16	8	1	158	70	88	26	44	0
40	Hudson O'Keeffe	19	–	Oakleigh (U18)	–	–	–	–	–	–	–	–	–	–	–
41	Domanic Akuei	21	–	Carlton academy	–	–	–	–	–	–	–	–	–	–	–
45	Alex Mirkov	24	–	Carlton reserves	–	–	–	–	–	–	–	–	–	–	–
Senior coaching panel
	Coach	Coaching position				Carlton Coaching debut		Former clubs as coach
	Michael Voss	Senior coach				2022		Brisbane Lions (s), Port Adelaide (a)
	Luke Power	Head of development, reserves coach				2020		GWS (a), AFL Academy Manager
	Tim Clarke	Assistant coach (Midfield)				2016		Richmond (a), Coburg (s), Richmond reserves (s), Gold Coast (a)
	Aaron Hamill	Assistant coach (backline)				2022		St Kilda (a), Sandringham (s)
	Ashley Hansen	Assistant coach (senior)				2022		Western Bulldogs (a), Footscray reserves (s)
	Matthew Kreuzer	Assistant coach (ruck)				2022
	Jordan Russell	Assistant coach (forward line)				2022		Western Bulldogs (d), North Melbourne (a)
	Tom Lonergan	Development and talent manager				2023		Calder Cannons (d), Geelong Falcons (d)
	Brad Ebert	Development coach				2023		Port Adelaide (m)
	Torin Baker	Carlton College of Sport and Academy and development coach				2021		Western Jets (s), Hawthorn (d)
	Aaron Greaves	Coaching and performance manager				2022		Melbourne (d, a), Port Adelaide (a, d), North Melbourne (d), AFL umpires (s)

- For players: (c) denotes captain, (vc) denotes vice-captain.
- For coaches: (s) denotes senior coach, (cs) denotes caretaker senior coach, (a) denotes assistant coach, (d) denotes development coach, (m) denotes managerial or administrative role in a football or coaching department

== Playing list changes ==
The following summarises all player changes which occurred after the 2023 season. Unless otherwise noted, draft picks refer to selections in the 2023 national draft.

Between seasons, Carlton saw the retirements of two long-term players: Ed Curnow, after thirteen seasons and 221 games; and Lachie Plowman after eight seasons and 125 games. Fringe midfielders Zac Fisher and Paddy Dow requested and were granted trades after seven and six years with the club respectively, seeking greater opportunities in other clubs' midfields. The club also traded for former top ten draft pick Elijah Hollands – brother of second-year player Oliver – from Gold Coast.

=== In ===
Player	Former Club	League	via
Rob Monahan	Kerry GAA	GAA	Category B rookie signing
Elijah Hollands	Gold Coast	AFL	Trade period, along with a second-round selection (provisionally No. 28) and a fourth-round selection in the 2024 AFL draft#2024 national draft, in exchange for a higher second-round selection (provisionally No. 25) and Essendon's third-round selection in the 2024 national draft.
Orazio Fantasia	Port Adelaide	AFL	Signed as a delisted free agent after the trade period.
Ashton Moir	Glenelg	SANFL	2023 national draft, first round selection (No. 29 overall).
Billy Wilson	Dandenong Stingrays	Coates Talent League	2023 national draft, second round selection (No. 34 overall).
Matt Carroll	Sandringham Dragons	Coates Talent League	2024 rookie draft, first round selection (No. 15 overall).
Cooper Lord	North Melbourne reserves	VFL	2024 mid-season draft, first round selection (No. 9 overall).

=== Out ===
Player	New Club	League	via
Ed Curnow	Lorne (as coach)	Colac & District FL	Retired from the rookie list.
Lachie Plowman	Maribyrnong Park	Essendon District FL	Retired.
Sam Philp	Bundoora	Northern FL	Delisted after the season.
Josh Honey	Keilor	Essendon District FL	Delisted after the season.
Lochie O'Brien	Wangaratta Rovers	O&MFL	Delisted from the rookie list after the season.
Zac Fisher	North Melbourne	AFL	Trade period, along with a first-round selection (provisionally No. 17), in exchange for a lower first-round selection and a second-round selection (provisionally No. 21 and 25).
Paddy Dow	St Kilda	AFL	Trade period, in a four-way trade which saw Carlton give up Dow and its third-round and fourth-round selections in the 2024 national draft to St Kilda and Essendon respectively, in exchange for Essendon's third-round selection and Western Bulldogs' and Fremantle's fourth-round selections in the 2024 national draft.

=== List management ===
Player	Change
Matt Cottrell	Elevated from the rookie list to the senior list.
Lachie Cowan	Changed guernsey number from No. 26 to No. 2.
Oliver Hollands	Changed guernsey number from No. 14 to No. 4.
Jaxon Binns	Changed guernsey number from No. 32 to No. 25.
Matt Duffy	Carlton announced Duffy's recruitment from Longford GAA as a Category B rookie signing in August 2023; but after he suffered a knee injury suffered playing Gaelic football in November 2023, his start was deferred by a year and he was left off the 2024 list.

== Season summary ==
=== Pre-season ===
Carlton played two practice matches, the first deemed unofficial match simulation and the second deemed an official practice match, as part of its lead-up to the premiership season.

**Date and local time**	**Opponent**	**Scores** (Carlton's scores indicated in **bold**)			**Venue**
**Date and local time**	**Opponent**	Home	Away	Result	**Venue**
Thursday, 22 February (11:30 am)	Geelong	**8.8 (56)**	10.13 (73)	Lost by 17 points	Ikon Park (H)
Wednesday, 28 February (6:40 pm)	Melbourne	**10.3 (63)**	15.11 (101)	Lost by 38 points	Ikon Park (H)

=== Home-and-away season ===
Following Carlton's strong second half to the 2023 season, Carlton was widely predicted to be a finalist in 2024 and opened the season fourth-favourite for the premiership. The season opened well with four straight wins – although two were against eventual bottom-four opponents – before four losses in six weeks saw Carlton drop to tenth place.

Through May and June, Carlton put together a very strong five-game winning streak – including big wins against eventual top four clubs Port Adelaide and Geelong – which saw the club move to second place on the ladder with a six-point advantage over third. Through this period, Carlton was near the top of the league for pressure applied and points scored, and efficiency inside forward 50, and was considered a strong threat to Sydney (which at that stage was a runaway leader on the ladder) for premiership favouritism.

However, the final two months saw a drop in form, the club winning only two of its last eight games – and those wins coming against bottom-three teams North Melbourne and West Coast. This included losing against top-four opponents GWS and Port Adelaide despite holding a five-goal lead in the second quarter of each game; and a three-point loss against Collingwood after Mitch McGovern missed an after the siren 45m set shot.

In round 22, Carlton dropped out of the top eight after losing the big percentage advantage it had over Hawthorn in a disastrous loss which blew out to 74 points as match day injuries saw Carlton play most of the second half with no fit interchanges. With a league-high 17-man injury list, Carlton regained eighth place with a win against West Coast in the penultimate round. This set up a final round in which Carlton need to defeat St Kilda in the Sunday afternoon game, or see Port Adelaide defeat Fremantle in the Sunday evening game, to hold eighth place: against St Kilda, after trailing by as much as 20 points in the third quarter, Carlton took the lead entering time-on in the final quarter, before St Kilda's Jack Higgins snapped a goal with only 12 seconds remaining to secure a two-point win for St Kilda; but Carlton's position in eighth place was secured when Port Adelaide won a close game against Fremantle, kicking three late goals to win by 20 points.

Across the entirety of the season, Carlton was the fourth-highest scoring team but also conceded the fifth-most points; this was a significant shift from its 2023 structure when it was ninth for points scored but conceded the second fewest, and was particularly put down to a decline in midfield defensive pressure which saw opponents able to score heavily from stoppages. Overall, across what was an unusually even home-and-away season in which only the bottom four clubs failed to reach at least an 11–12 record, Carlton was 4–4 in eight matches against the top five, 4–5 in ten matches against the clubs who finished 6th to 14th (who all won between eleven and fourteen games), and 5–1 against the bottom four.

**Rd**	**Date and local time**	**Opponent**	**Scores** (Carlton's scores indicated in **bold**)			**Venue**	**Attendance**	**Ladder**
**Rd**	**Date and local time**	**Opponent**	Home	Away	Result	**Venue**	**Attendance**	**Ladder**
Op	Friday, 8 March (7:40 pm)	Brisbane Lions	12.13 (85)	**13.8 (86)**	Won by 1 point	The Gabba (A)	33,367	4th
1	Thursday, 14 March (7:30 pm)	Richmond	**12.14 (86)**	12.9 (81)	Won by 5 points	Melbourne Cricket Ground (H)	83,881	4th
2	Bye							7th
3	Friday, 29 March (4:20 pm)	North Melbourne	12.9 (81)	**21.11 (137)**	Won by 56 points	Marvel Stadium (A)	47,565	6th
4	Saturday, 6 April (3:50 pm)	Fremantle	9.9 (63)	**10.13 (73)**	Won by 10 points	Adelaide Oval (N)	45,970 ^{D/H}	4th
5	Saturday, 13 April (4:35 pm)	Adelaide	**14.14 (98)**	16.4 (100)	Lost by 2 points	Marvel Stadium (H)	46,283	6th
6	Saturday, 20 April (4:35 pm)	GWS	**17.15 (117)**	15.8 (98)	Won by 19 points	Marvel Stadium (H)	40,474	4th
7	Saturday, 27 April (4:35 pm)	Geelong	18.10 (118)	**15.15 (105)**	Lost by 13 points	Melbourne Cricket Ground (A)	87,775	6th
8	Friday, 3 May (7:40 pm)	Collingwood	**12.7 (79)**	12.13 (85)	Lost by 6 points	Melbourne Cricket Ground (H)	88,362	8th
9	Thursday, 9 May (7:30 pm)	Melbourne	**12.5 (77)**	11.10 (76)	Won by 1 point	Melbourne Cricket Ground (H)	58,472	7th
10	Friday, 17 May (7:40 pm)	Sydney	17.15 (117)	**9.11 (65)**	Lost by 52 points	Sydney Cricket Ground (A)	44,047	10th
11	Saturday, 25 May (1:45 pm)	Gold Coast	**15.12 (102)**	11.7 (73)	Won by 29 points	Marvel Stadium (H)	39,597	8th
12	Thursday, 30 May (7:30 pm)	Port Adelaide	10.11 (71)	**16.11 (107)**	Won by 36 points	Adelaide Oval (A)	40,532	5th
13	Sunday, 9 June (7:20 pm)	Essendon	9.16 (70)	**15.6 (96)**	Won by 26 points	Melbourne Cricket Ground (H)	88,510	2nd
14	Bye							2nd
15	Friday, 21 June (7:40 pm)	Geelong	**21.12 (138)**	11.9 (75)	Won by 63 points	Melbourne Cricket Ground (H)	75,218	2nd
16	Sunday, 30 June (3:20 pm)	Richmond	10.10 (70)	**20.11 (131)**	Won by 61 points	Melbourne Cricket Ground (A)	58,298	2nd
17	Friday, 6 July (7:30 pm)	GWS	18.8 (116)	**16.8 (104)**	Lost by 12 points	Sydney Showground Stadium (A)	11,730	2nd
18	Saturday, 13 July (4:35 pm)	Western Bulldogs	14.16 (100)	**12.14 (86)**	Lost by 14 points	Marvel Stadium (A)	45,387	2nd
19	Sunday, 21 July (4:40 pm)	North Melbourne	**16.11 (107)**	14.4 (88)	Won by 19 points	Marvel Stadium (H)	40,014	2nd
20	Friday, 26 July (7:40 pm)	Port Adelaide	**9.11 (65)**	11.13 (79)	Lost by 14 points	Marvel Stadium (H)	40,500	4th
21	Saturday, 3 August (7:20 pm)	Collingwood	12.12 (84)	**11.15 (81)**	Lost by 3 points	Melbourne Cricket Ground (A)	86,879	8th
22	Sunday, 11 August (1:10 pm)	Hawthorn	**5.8 (38)**	16.16 (112)	Lost by 74 points	Melbourne Cricket Ground (H)	84,773	9th
23	Sunday, 18 August (2:40 pm)	West Coast	4.10 (34)	**14.15 (99)**	Won by 65 points	Optus Stadium (A)	48,455	8th
24	Sunday, 25 August (3:20 pm)	St Kilda	**11.8 (74)**	11.10 (76)	Lost by 2 points	Marvel Stadium (H)	43,843	8th

=== Finals ===
The pre-finals bye allowed Carlton the chance to get six players back from its late-season injury list. Carlton was thoroughly beaten early in the elimination final by eventual premiers Brisbane, at one stage leading 9.6 (60) to 0.0 (0) before Carlton's first score late in the second quarter; five goals in a row brought the margin back to about five goals midway through the third quarter, but Carlton couldn't bring the margin much closer than that and lost by 28 points.

**Week**	**Date and local time**	**Opponent**	**Scores** (Carlton's scores indicated in **bold**)			**Venue**	**Attendance**
**Week**	**Date and local time**	**Opponent**	Home	Away	Result	**Venue**	**Attendance**
First Elimination Final	Saturday, 7 September (7:30 pm)	Brisbane Lions	14.15 (99)	**11.5 (71)**	Lost by 28 points	The Gabba (A)	35,660

== Team records ==
- Opening round – Carlton trailed Brisbane Lions by 46 points halfway through the second quarter, before recovering to lead at three-quarter time and ultimately win by one point. It was the greatest in-game deficit Carlton had overcome for victory since 2007, and the second greatest in club history.
- Opening round – Carlton's win against Brisbane ended Brisbane's 14-game home winning streak at the Gabba.
- Opening round – Carlton defeated Brisbane at the Gabba for the first time since round 9, 2013, ending an 8-game losing streak.
- Round 22, 2023 to Round 1 2024 – Carlton went through a streak of six consecutive victories (in non-consecutive matches) by six points or fewer, the longest such streak in VFL/AFL history.
- Elimination final – Carlton failed to score until the 25th minute of the second quarter, which was the 57th minute of play. It was the deepest into a game that any club had been held scoreless in a match since at least 2001, when detailed minute-by-minute scoring records first became available.

== Individual awards and records ==
=== John Nicholls Medal ===
The Carlton Football Club Best and Fairest awards night took place on 6 October 2024.

John Nicholls Medal

The winner of the John Nicholls Medal was Patrick Cripps, who polled 204 votes to win the award for the fifth time in his career, tying the eponymous John Nicholls for the most best and fairest awards in the club's history. Nic Newman finished second for the second consecutive season with 148 votes, just ahead of Sam Walsh who was third with 147 votes.

Pos.	Player	Votes
1st	Patrick Cripps	204
2nd	Nic Newman	148
3rd	Sam Walsh	147
4th	Jacob Weitering	144
5th	George Hewett	141
6th	Blake Acres	122
7th	Tom de Koning	121
8th	Harry McKay	117
9th	Charlie Curnow	116
10th	Matt Kennedy	110

Other awards

The following other awards were presented on John Nicholls Medal night:-

- Best Young Player – Elijah Hollands
- Best Clubman – Matt Kennedy
- Best Finals Player – Patrick Cripps
- Spirit of Carlton Award – Tom de Koning
- Bill Lanyon Inner Blue Ruthless Award – Patrick Cripps
- Carltonians William A. Cook Award – Patrick Cripps
- Coaches' Award – George Hewitt
- Players' Award – Patrick Cripps
- Interstate Coterie Award – Nic Newman

=== Brownlow Medal ===
Patrick Cripps won the 2024 Brownlow Medal. He polled 45 votes to finish seven votes ahead of second-placed Nick Daicos (Collingwood). It was Cripps' second Brownlow Medal, his first having been won in 2022. He became the first player to win the award twice while playing for Carlton; Carlton's other dual-Brownlow Medallists Greg Williams and Chris Judd won their first Brownlow Medals with other clubs.

Cripps was established as Brownlow favourite during a particularly strong May and June, and by the time of the count he was a slight but near-equal favourite over Daicos. Cripps ultimately polled 45 votes to win the medal ahead of Daicos' 38 votes. It was the most dominant Brownlow Medal performance in history: Cripps and Daicos both broke the previous record for most votes under the 3–2–1 voting system, which was 36 votes held by Dustin Martin (2017) and Ollie Wines (2021); and Cripps also polled a new record of 1.96 votes per game played, breaking Lachie Neale's 2020 record of 1.82.

=== Leading goalkickers ===
Charlie Curnow was the club's leading goalkicker for the third consecutive time and fourth time overall, kicking 57 goals. Curnow led in the race for a third consecutive Coleman Medal for much of the season, before falling behind eventual winner Jesse Hogan after round 21, then missing the last two matches with injury to finish second. Harry McKay was second with 49 goals; since winning the Coleman Medal in 2021, McKay had drawn heavy criticism for year on year deterioration in his goalkicking accuracy, but delivered an improved return of 49.21 after significantly reducing his use of across-the-body snaps from set shots. Matthew Owies, in his final season with the club, was third with 33 goals, his best return for the club.

Player	Goals	Behinds
Charlie Curnow	57	41
Harry McKay	49	21
Matthew Owies	33	13
Elijah Hollands	17	10
Patrick Cripps	17	6

=== Individual records ===
- Round 10 – the match was Charlie Curnow's 57th consecutive appearance in which he scored at least one goal, breaking the Carlton Football Club record set by Harry Vallence in the 1930s. The streak ultimately ended at 66 matches when he was held goalless in round 21.

=== Other awards ===
Honorific teams

- Two Carlton players were named in the 2024 All-Australian team: Patrick Cripps (ruck-rover), named in the team for the fourth time and named vice-captain for the second time; and Jacob Weitering (full back), named in the team for the first time after having been named in the squad but missed the final team each year from 2020 to 2023. Two other Carlton players were nominated in the 44-man squad but not in the final team: Charlie Curnow and Harry McKay.

League best and fairest awards

In addition to his Brownlow Medal, Patrick Cripps placed in the following other league best and fairest awards:

- Lou Richards Medal (Nine's Sunday Footy Show) – winner
- Herald Sun Player of the Year – winner
- AFL Coaches' Association Champion Player – second place
- Leigh Matthews Trophy (AFL Players Association most valuable player) – second place

Statistical leaders

- Patrick Cripps led the league in handpasses (406), clearances (187) and contested possessions (360) for the home and away season.

Other awards

- Brad Ebert won the Phil Walsh Memorial Scholarship from the AFL Coaches Association for his commitment to player development and mentorship.

Carlton Football Club Hall of Fame

At the 2024 Carlton Football Club Hall of Fame dinner on 18 March, three players were inducted into the Hall of Fame:

- Jack Carney, who played 84 games and won one premiership for the club between 1936 and 1941, before serving in administrative and reserves team support roles with the club over the following decades;
- Neil Chandler, who played 76 games and won three premierships with the club between 1968 and 1974;
- Brendan Fevola, who played 187 games and kicked 575 goals for the club between 1999 and 2009, winning two Coleman Medals and seven club leading goalkicker awards.

Additionally, to celebrate the club's 160th season, a special contingent of historical inductees, including members of the club's early history and all triple premiership winners from the club's 1906, 1907 and 1908 premierships, were inducted. These inductees were:

- Jack Baker, who played 116 matches and won one premiership between 1882 and 1888, and was captain in 1884 and 1885;
- Alf Baud, who played 53 matches and won two premierships between 1913 and 1915, and was captain for the latter half of 1915
- Les Beck, who played 60 matches and won three premierships between 1906 and 1909;
- Jack Conway, who played about 33 matches and won one premiership between 1866 and 1871, and was captain from 1868 until 1871;
- Billy Dick, who played 100 matches and won one premiership between 1911 and 1918, and was captain from 1914 to 1917;
- Brighton Diggins, who played 31 matches as captain-coach and won one premiership between 1938 and 1940;
- Jack Donovan, who played about 72 matches and won one premiership between 1869 and 1883, and was captain in 1871, 1872 and 1874;
- Jim Flynn, who played 77 matches and won three premierships, including two premierships as captain, between 1903 and 1910;
- John Gardiner, who played and won four premierships between 1872 and 1879, was captain from 1876 until 1879, and served as president from 1914 until 1924;
- Billy Goer, who played about 130 matches and won four premierships between 1873 and 1889, and was captain in 1882;
- Harry Guy, who played about 70 matches and won four premierships between 1865 and 1878, and was captain in 1875;
- Robert Heatley, who played 33 matches in 1883 and 1884, served as president from 1901 until 1903, and was chairman of the Carlton Recreation Ground Management Committee;
- Fred Jinks, who played 60 matches and won three premierships between 1906 and 1909;
- George 'Mallee' Johnson, who played 90 matches and won three premierships between 1905 and 1909;
- Alex Lang, who played 105 matches and won three premierships between 1906 and 1917;
- Ted Kennedy, who played 106 matches and won three premierships between 1904 and 1909;
- Tommy Leydin, who played about 91 matches and won one premiership between 1885 and 1889, and was captain from 1887 until 1889;
- Lanty O'Brien, who played about 50 matches and won four premierships between 1865 and 1876;
- Billy Payne, who played 127 games and won three premierships between 1904 and 1912;
- George Robertson, who played between 1872 and 1881, and was captain from 1880 until 1881;
- George Topping, who played 125 matches and won three premierships between 1902 and 1916.

== AFL Women's ==
Squad

From 2023, Carlton lost inaugural AFL Women's player Phoebe McWilliams, who retired after eight seasons in the league and two with Carlton; traded Paige Trudgeon and Annie Lee; and delisted Imogen Milford, Daisy Walker and Chloe Wrigley. Carlton gained three-year Collingwood player Tarni Brown, five-year Western Bulldogs player Celine Moody, and Port Adelaide's Yasmin Duursma in trades; and Lila Keck and Meg Robertson in the draft.

The club's 2024 squad is given below. Numbers in parentheses represent games played and goals scored for the season.

Carlton Football Club (2024)
Senior list		Coaching staff
1 Amelia Velardo (3,1); 2 Jessica Dal Pos (6,1); 3 Darcy Vescio (vc) (9,2); 4 Keeley Skepper (10,5); 5 Abbie McKay (9,1); 6 Gab Pound (11,0); 7 Tahlia Read (0,0); 8 Celine Moody (9,2); 9 Kerryn Peterson (c) (8,0); 10 Mimi Hill (10,1); 11 Yasmin Duursma (3,0); 12 Jess Good (11,0); 13 Lulu Beatty (4,0); 14 Marianna Anthony (8,1); 15 Meg Robertson (7,0); 16 Breann Moody (11,5)	17 Dayna Finn (10,1); 18 Maddy Guerin (11,2); 19 Erone Fitzpatrick (0,0); 20 Lily Goss (11,0); 21 Harriet Cordner (11,0); 22 Mia Austin (11,5); 23 Lila Keck (6,1); 24 Brooke Vickers (0,0); 25 Keeley Sherar (11,4); 26 Tarni Brown (10,2); 27 Genevieve Lawson-Tavan (10,0); 28 Jade Halfpenny (2,1); 34 Taylor Ortlepp (4,0); 36 Ciara Fitzgerald (10,0); 49 Madeline Hendrie (6,0)	**Head coach**: Mathew Buck; **Assistant coaches**: Tom Couch (midfield); Christina Polatajko (forwards); Glenn Strachan (backline); Lachlan Swaney (development); Ash Naulty (head of AFLW); Legend: (c) Captain(s); (vc) Vice-captain(s); Updated: Source(s): Senior list, Coaching staff

Season summary

Carlton finished 14th in the league with a 4–7 record, although several heavy defeats and had the league's second-worst percentage. The week 7 win against Fremantle was the club's only win against a finalist, while two of its four wins were against the bottom two clubs (Gold Coast and Collingwood).

**Rd**	**Date and local time**	**Opponent**	**Scores** (Carlton's scores indicated in **bold**)			**Venue**	**Attendance**	**Ladder**
**Rd**	**Date and local time**	**Opponent**	Home	Away	Result	**Venue**	**Attendance**	**Ladder**
1	Sunday, 1 September (1:05 pm)	Hawthorn	9.12 (66)	**4.4 (28)**	Lost by 38 points	Kinetic Stadium (A)	2,794	15th
2	Sunday, 8 September (1:05 pm)	Gold Coast	5.8 (38)	**5.9 (39)**	Won by 1 point	Great Barrier Reef Arena (A)	1,319	14th
3	Saturday, 14 September (2:35 pm)	Geelong	**4.5 (29)**	0.5 (5)	Won by 24 points	Ikon Park (H)	2,417	9th
4	Thursday, 19 September (7:15 pm)	Richmond	6.3 (39)	**0.6 (6)**	Lost by 33 points	Ikon Park (A)	1,855	
5	Wednesday, 25 September (7:15 pm)	Kangaroos	**1.4 (10)**	12.7 (79)	Lost by 69 points	Ikon Park (H)	2,027	
5	Sunday, 29 September (4:35 pm)	Port Adelaide	8.10 (58)	**3.5 (23)**	Lost by 35 points	Alberton Oval (A)	1,706	
6	Saturday, 5 October (7:15 pm)	Brisbane	**1.7 (13)**	9.14 (68)	Lost by 55 points	Ikon Park (H)	1,452	
7	Saturday, 12 October (4:15 pm)	Fremantle	4.6 (30)	**5.4 (34)**	Won by 4 points	Fremantle Community Bank Oval (A)	2,051	12th
8	Thursday, 17 October (7:15 pm)	Western Bulldogs	**4.4 (28)**	9.7 (61)	Lost by 33 points	Ikon Park (H)	1,320	14th
9	Sunday, 272 October (3:05 pm)	Collingwood	4.4 (28)	**5.2 (32)**	Won by 4 points	Victoria Park (A)	2,873	14th
10	Saturday, 2 November (7:15 pm)	Essendon	**3.6 (24)**	9.6 (60)	Lost by 36 points	Ikon Park (H)	2,655	14th

== Reserves ==
Carlton fielded reserves and state level teams in the men's and women's competitions during the 2024 season.

=== Men's ===
Carlton's men's reserves team contested its seventh VFL season; and its 87th overall season of reserves and state level competition dating back to 1919.

Club head of development Luke Power continued as reserves coach for the second season. VFL-listed players newly signed to team included: former AFL senior players Lachie Young (Western Bulldogs/North Melbourne) and Tom Phillips (Collingwood/Hawthorn); and Ollie Badr, Kristian Ferronato, Jess Gedi, Luca Goonan, Bailey Lambert, Luke Nelson, Flynn Riley, Michael Rudd, Tyson Sruk and Callum Verrall. Retained from 2023 were Noah Barnes, Jed Brereton, Ned Cahill, Patrick Dozzi, Hayden Gill, Darcy Hogg, Blake Kuipers, Jack Lefroy, Michael Lewis, Zavier Maher, Jack Maruff, Liam McMahon, Aiden “AJ” Mills, Hugo Nosiara, Logan Prout, Heath Ramshaw, Archie Stevens, Lachie Swaney and Will White. Lachie Young and Lachie Swaney were appointed co-captains following the departure of 2023 captain Ben Crocker.

Carlton's reserves had an unsuccessful season, finishing 19th of 21 teams with a win–loss record of 4–14. Liam McMahon won the team's best and fairest award.

=== Women's ===
The club fielded a team in the VFL Women's competition for the sixth time. The club's AFL Women's senior assistant coach Glenn Strachan took over from Tom Stafford as VFL Women's senior coach, after the latter had served two seasons in the role. Octavia di Donato and Eliza Wood were appointed co-captains, each for the first time.

Carlton finished 9th out of 12 premiership-eligible teams with a win-loss record of 5–9. Eliza Wood won the team's best and fairest award.

== Notes ==
1. The match was the first half of a ticketed Gather Round double-header, played prior to the Western Bulldogs vs Geelong match at 7:40pm.
