= 2020 Carlton Football Club season =

Carlton Football Club
2020 season
- President: Mark LoGiudice
- Coach: David Teague
- Captain: Patrick Cripps; Sam Docherty
- Home grounds: Melbourne Cricket Ground (Training and administrative: Ikon Park)
- AFL season: 11th (7–10)
- AFL Women's: Preliminary finalist
- Leading goalkicker: Harry McKay (21)
- Club membership: 67,035

The 2020 Carlton Football Club season was the Carlton Football Club's 157th season of competition. The season was disrupted and partially curtailed by the COVID-19 pandemic.

It was the club's men's team's 124th season as a member of the Australian Football League. The team finished 11th out of eighteen teams with a 7–10 record in the 2020 AFL season.

It was the club's women's team's fourth season as a member of the AFL Women's competition. The team reached the preliminary finals of the 2020 AFL Women's season, before the onset of the pandemic saw the season cancelled without the premiership being awarded.

== Club summary ==
The 2020 AFL season was the 124th season of the VFL/AFL competition since its inception in 1897; and, having competed in every season, it was also the 124th season contested by the Carlton Football Club. Contractually, Carlton's primary home ground continued to be the Melbourne Cricket Ground, with many games also to have been played at Marvel Stadium, and traditional home ground Ikon Park continued to serve as the training and administrative base; however, due to the coronavirus pandemic forcing games to be moved out of Victoria, the club hosted games at Metricon Stadium and the Gabba in Queensland and Optus Stadium in Perth, hosted no games at the Melbourne Cricket Ground, and used the Mercure Gold Coast as a training base for much of the season.

The club fielded its women's team in the fourth season of the AFL Women's competition, running in February and March, and Ikon Park served as the home ground for AFL Women's matches. Carlton continued its alignment with the Northern Blues in the Victorian Football League through the pre-season; but terminated the alignment on 26 March as a cost-saving measure during the coronavirus pandemic; as with all AFL clubs, Carlton had no reserves team or affiliation during the season, and reserves players were restricted to playing scratch matches against other AFL clubs. The VFL Women's season was cancelled due to the pandemic, so the club's VFL Women's team did not compete.

Car manufacturer Hyundai, which had been a major sponsor of the club continuously since 2008, and airline Virgin Australia, which had upgraded from a secondary sponsor to a major sponsor during the 2017 season, continued as the club's two major sponsors, under deals in place until 2022; the latter sponsorship remained in place, despite the airline going into administration during the coronavirus pandemic. The club's long term on- and off-field apparel deal with Nike, which had been in place since 1998, came to an end in October 2019, and the club signed a new 10-year apparel deal with PUMA.

The club again achieved a record membership in 2020, finishing with 67,035 members for the year. The club passed the full-year 2019 record in early March, before the season had even begun – as well as before the curtailment of the season was announced. This was the club's third consecutive huge increase in membership numbers, having increased from 50,130 to a then-record 56,005 members in 2018, then to another record of 64,269 in 2019.

== Impact of COVID-19 pandemic ==
The 2020 season was disrupted by the COVID-19 pandemic, which was formally declared a pandemic on 11 March 2020, eight days prior to the scheduled start of the men's premiership season and prior to Round 6 of the women's season.

Carlton's season endured the following disruptions and special arrangements:

- The men's season was suspended after Round 1, and was shortened from the originally scheduled 22 matches to 17 matches. The season did not restart until 11 June.
- The team was forced to temporarily relocate away from Victoria after Round 5, due to interstate travel restrictions placed on Victorians during the state's second wave of the virus in July. The club set up a base at the Mercure Gold Coast hub in south-east Queensland starting from Round 6, and travelled to Perth for a one-month hub from Round 9 to 12.
- The women's home-and-away season was shortened from eight matches to six. Three weeks of finals were to follow, but only one was played before the season was cancelled.
- Matches in Victoria were played in empty stadiums, and those played interstate in front of restricted-sized crowds, in response to government-imposed restrictions imposed on public gatherings.
- The start of the 2020 VFL season was delayed, before AFL-listed players were excluded from competing in state league competitions altogether, to keep players in the fully professional environment for tighter medical and quarantine controls. As a result, Carlton reserves players were restricted only to training, or playing scratch matches against other AFL clubs.

Carlton, along with all AFL clubs, were forced to find significant cost savings to cover the loss of revenue, which in Carlton's case included gate and broadcast revenue from closed and cancelled games, as well as gaming revenue as a result of non-essential venue closures across the country; the club also suffered financially as a result of joint major sponsor Virgin Australia being placed into administration, itself severely affected by travel restrictions imposed during the pandemic, although the club's partnership with Virgin continued.

Among the cost saving decisions, Carlton ended its 18-year association with its VFL-affiliate, the Northern Blues, in late March; the club had been investing significant money in building up the club as a development ground for its reserves and a senior development pathway for the northern suburbs; but with money tight, opted to end the affiliation and adopt a lower-cost strategy of re-establishing a stand-alone reserves team, which would contest the VFL at the next opportunity. The Northern Blues club, which was heavily dependent on Carlton's financial support to remain viable as an entity, initially announced that it would be wound up as a result, and it was not included in the ultimately cancelled plans for a shortened 2020 VFL season; but, the club regrouped and remained in the VFL under as a stand-alone senior Northern Bullants from 2021. As with all other AFL clubs, most of the club's workforce was stood down during the height of the pandemic.

During July, while based interstate, the club was fined $45,000 for an inadvertent breach of COVID-19 protocols when one member of the travelling party sought childcare services outside the league's quarantine bubble.

== Senior personnel ==
Mark LoGiudice continued as club president, a role he has held since June 2014.

David Teague entered his first full season as the appointed senior coach of the club, having served as caretaker during the second half of 2019 after Brendon Bolton was sacked. Teague was appointed senior coach on a three-year contract with two rounds remaining in the 2019 season. To the coaching panel over the preseason were added: Sydney assistant coach Henry Playfair, who became head of coaching performance; AFL Academy manager Luke Power, who became head of development; and Geelong Falcons coach Daniel O'Keefe in a development coaching role. Power replaced Shane Watson, who departed after four years with the club. Following the trade and draft periods, general manager of List Management and Strategy Stephen Silvagni departed the club after five years in the role. The financial pressure of the coronavirus pandemic, as well as the termination of the affiliation with the Northern Blues, resulted in Northern coach Josh Fraser being terminated.

Patrick Cripps and Sam Docherty continued in their roles as joint captains for the second consecutive season – with Docherty playing his first games as captain after having missed the 2019 season (as well as the 2018 season) due to injury. Liam Jones, Jacob Weitering and Sam Walsh were added to the club's expanded seven-man leadership group, with Ed Curnow and Marc Murphy holding their places. Veteran Kade Simpson stepped aside from the group.

== Squad for 2020 ==
Statistics are correct as of end of 2019 season. Flags represent the state of origin, i.e. the state in which the player played his Under-18s football.

Senior List
No.	State	Player	Age	AFL Debut	Recruited from	Career (to end 2019)		2020 Player Statistics
No.	State	Player	Age	AFL Debut	Recruited from	Gms	Gls	Gms	Gls	B	D	K	HB	M	T	HO
1	(Victoria (state))	Jack Silvagni	22	2016	Oakleigh (U18)	60	45	3	2	2	16	12	4	5	2	0
2	(Victoria (state))	Paddy Dow	20	2018	Bendigo (U18)	39	14	3	1	2	27	12	15	6	3	0
3	(Victoria (state))	Marc Murphy (lg)	32	2006	Oakleigh (U18)	268	185	17	4	7	313	178	135	63	37	0
4	(Victoria (state))	Lochie O'Brien	20	2018	Bendigo (U18)	35	9	1	1	0	7	5	2	2	2	0
5	(Western Australia)	Sam Petrevski-Seton	21	2017	Claremont	64	19	16	0	0	217	155	62	49	36	0
6	(Victoria (state))	Kade Simpson	35	2003	Eastern (U18)	325	138	17	1	0	264	201	63	66	19	0
7	(New South Wales)	Matthew Kennedy	22	2016	Collingullie-Glenfield Park, GWS	41	21	7	2	1	113	63	50	26	20	0
8	(Victoria (state))	Matthew Kreuzer	30	2008	Northern (U18)	188	94	1	0	0	1	0	1	1	1	7
9	(Western Australia)	Patrick Cripps (c)	24	2014	East Fremantle	101	47	17	7	11	334	152	182	40	81	0
10	(Victoria (state))	Harry McKay	22	2017	Gippsland (U18)	35	50	13	21	15	97	76	21	57	20	0
11	(Western Australia)	Mitch McGovern	25	2016	Claremont, Adelaide	64	89	12	9	2	88	70	18	39	22	3
12	(Victoria (state))	Tom De Koning	20	2018	Dandenong (U18)	2	1	7	0	2	54	26	28	10	16	87
13	(Victoria (state))	Liam Stocker	19	2019	Sandringham (U18)	5	0	–	–	–	–	–	–	–	–	–
14	(Tasmania)	Liam Jones (lg)	28	2010	North Hobart, Western Bulldogs	125	84	17	0	2	135	111	24	72	24	0
15	(Victoria (state))	Sam Docherty (c)	26	2013	Gippsland (U18), Brisbane Lions	92	14	16	0	1	298	216	82	83	19	0
16	(Victoria (state))	Darcy Lang	24	2014	Geelong (U18), Geelong	63	42	1	1	1	4	2	2	0	2	0
17	(Victoria (state))	Brodie Kemp	18	–	Bendigo (U18)	–	–	–	–	–	–	–	–	–	–	–
18	(Victoria (state))	Sam Walsh (lg)	19	2019	Geelong (U18)	22	6	17	8	4	349	193	156	73	47	0
19	(Victoria (state))	Eddie Betts	33	2005	Calder (U18), Adelaide	316	600	15	13	13	133	89	44	24	41	0
20	(Victoria (state))	Lachie Plowman	25	2013	Calder (U18), GWS	94	1	16	0	2	163	116	47	54	30	0
21	(Western Australia)	Jack Martin	24	2014	Claremont, Gold Coast	97	81	15	12	11	203	115	88	64	48	0
22	(Victoria (state))	Caleb Marchbank	23	2015	Murray (U18), GWS	48	0	–	–	–	–	–	–	–	–	–
23	(Victoria (state))	Jacob Weitering (lg)	22	2016	Dandenong (U18)	76	10	17	0	1	188	146	42	74	17	0
24	(Victoria (state))	Nic Newman	26	2017	Frankston, Sydney	54	18	2	0	0	15	13	2	4	2	0
25	(Western Australia)	Zac Fisher	21	2017	Perth	55	21	8	6	2	107	57	50	13	20	0
26	(New South Wales)	Harrison Macreadie	21	2017	Henty	9	0	–	–	–	–	–	–	–	–	–
27	(Victoria (state))	Marc Pittonet	23	2016	Oakleigh (U18), Hawthorn	7	0	13	0	3	109	59	50	23	25	292
28	(Victoria (state))	David Cuningham	22	2016	Oakleigh (U18)	25	14	12	6	6	138	72	66	32	33	0
29	(Victoria (state))	Cameron Polson	21	2017	Sandringham (U18)	16	4	3	0	1	24	16	8	3	3	0
30	(Victoria (state))	Charlie Curnow	22	2016	Geelong (U18)	58	77	–	–	–	–	–	–	–	–	–
31	(Victoria (state))	Tom Williamson	22	2017	North Ballarat (U18)	17	1	15	1	1	158	103	55	48	28	0
32	(Victoria (state))	Jack Newnes	26	2012	Northern (U18)	155	55	17	13	4	222	139	83	53	44	0
33	(Victoria (state))	Sam Ramsay	18	—	Calder (U18)	–	–	–	–	–	–	–	–	–	–	–
34	(Victoria (state))	Sam Philp	18	2020	Northern (U18)	–	–	2	1	1	14	8	6	1	3	0
35	(Victoria (state))	Ed Curnow (lg)	30	2011	Geelong (U18), Adelaide, Box Hill	165	36	17	4	3	320	212	108	42	88	0
37	(Victoria (state))	Ben Silvagni	19	–	Oakleigh (U18)	–	–	–	–	–	–	–	–	–	–	–
38	(Victoria (state))	Finbar O'Dwyer	19	–	Murray (U18)	–	–	–	–	–	–	–	–	–	–	–
41	(Victoria (state))	Levi Casboult	29	2012	Dandenong (U18)	124	132	17	16	8	152	112	40	80	31	86
43	(Victoria (state))	Will Setterfield	21	2017	Sandringham (U18), GWS	20	6	16	4	1	243	146	97	29	83	0
Rookie List
No.	State	Player	Age	AFL Debut	Recruited from	Career (to end 2019)		2020 Player Statistics
No.	State	Player	Age	AFL Debut	Recruited from	Gms	Gls	Gms	Gls	B	D	K	HB	M	T	HO
36	(Victoria (state))	Josh Honey	18	2020	Western (U18)	–	–	1	0	1	4	3	1	2	1	0
39	(Victoria (state))	Fraser Phillips	18	–	Gippsland (U18)	–	–	–	–	–	–	–	–	–	–	–
40	(Victoria (state))	Michael Gibbons	24	2019	Williamstown	21	16	15	11	6	207	144	63	51	42	0
44	(Victoria (state))	Matthew Owies	22	2020	St Kevin's, Seattle Redhawks	–	–	1	0	0	5	3	2	1	1	0
45	(Victoria (state))	Hugh Goddard	23	2015	Geelong (U18), St Kilda	12	1	–	–	–	–	–	–	–	–	–
46	(Victoria (state))	Matthew Cottrell	19	2020	Dandenong (U18)	–	–	5	2	0	53	44	9	8	4	0
47	(Victoria (state))	Callum Moore	23	2016	Calder (U18), Richmond	8	5	2	0	0	6	4	2	2	4	0
Senior coaching panel
	State	Coach	Coaching position				Carlton Coaching debut		Former clubs as coach
	(Victoria (state))	David Teague	Senior coach				2008		Carlton (d), Northern Bullants (s), West Coast (a), St Kilda (a), Adelaide (a)
	(New South Wales)	Henry Playfair	Head of coaching performance				2020		Sydney (a), St Kilda (a)
	(Victoria (state))	Luke Power	Head of development				2020		GWS (a), AFL Academy Manager
	(Victoria (state))	John Barker	Assistant coach (stoppages)				2011		St Kilda (a), Hawthorn (a)
	(Victoria (state))	Cameron Bruce	Assistant coach (forward)				2018		Hawthorn (a)
	(Victoria (state))	Dale Amos	Assistant coach (defence)				2016		South Barwon (s), Geelong (a), Geelong reserves (s)
	(Victoria (state))	Josh Fraser	Northern Blues senior coach (Until March)				2016		Gold Coast reserves (s)
	(Victoria (state))	Jason Davenport	Development coach (Forwards)				2018		North Shore (s)
	(Victoria (state))	Daniel O'Keefe	Development coach (Midfield)				2020		Geelong Falcons (s), Geelong reserves (a)
	(Victoria (state))	Brent Stanton	Development coach (Midfield and transition)				2018
	(Victoria (state))	Saverio Rocca	Specialist coach (goalkicking)				2017
	(New South Wales)	Hamish McIntosh	Specialist coach (ruck)				2019

- For players: (c) denotes captain, (vc) denotes vice-captain, (dvc) denotes deputy vice-captain, (lg) denotes leadership group.
- For coaches: (s) denotes senior coach, (cs) denotes caretaker senior coach, (a) denotes assistant coach, (d) denotes development coach, (m) denotes managerial or administrative role in a football or coaching department

== Playing list changes ==
The following summarises all player changes which occurred after the 2019 season. Unless otherwise noted, draft picks refer to selections in the 2019 National Draft.

The club was active in negotiations during the trading period, although ultimately executed only three trades for low picks, which included the return of life member Eddie Betts, returning to the club after six years with Adelaide. The club was involved in negotiations to secure Tom Papley from Sydney, but the deal was partly contingent on Sydney securing Essendon's Joe Daniher in a separate trade which ultimately fell through. Carlton also negotiated actively with Gold Coast to trade for uncontracted Jack Martin, offering a second-round draft pick and unable to meet Gold Coast's demands of a first round draft pick; Martin then walked out on the Suns, and Carlton signed him on a five-year $3m contract through the pre-season draft – with the contract heavily front-ended in such a way that Gold Coast, who had an earlier selection in the draft but insufficient salary cap space, couldn't redraft him.

=== In ===
Player	Former Club	League	via
(Victoria (state)) Eddie Betts	Adelaide	AFL	AFL trade period, in exchange for a fourth-round draft selection in the 2019 National Draft.
(Victoria (state)) Marc Pittonet	Hawthorn	AFL	AFL trade period, gained along with a fourth round draft pick (provisionally No. 61), in exchange for a third round draft pick and a later fourth round draft (provisionally No. 54 and 63).
(Victoria (state)) Jack Newnes	St Kilda	AFL	Delisted free agent signing.
(Victoria (state)) Brodie Kemp	Bendigo (U18)	NAB League	AFL National Draft, first round selection (No. 17 overall)
(Victoria (state)) Sam Philp	Northern (U18)	NAB League	AFL National Draft, second round selection (No. 20 overall)
(Victoria (state)) Sam Ramsay	Calder (U18)	NAB League	AFL National Draft, third round selection (No. 47 overall)
(Western Australia) Jack Martin	Gold Coast	AFL	AFL Pre-season Draft, first round selection (No. 1 overall).
(Victoria (state)) Josh Honey	Western (U18)	NAB League	AFL Rookie Draft, first round selection (No. 3 overall).
(Victoria (state)) Fraser Phillips	Gippsland (U18)	NAB League	AFL Rookie Draft, second round selection (No. 18 overall).
(Victoria (state)) Callum Moore	Richmond	AFL	Recruited to the rookie list during the supplemental selection period.

=== Out ===
Player	New Club	League	via
(Western Australia) Alex Fasolo	Montmorency	Northern FL	Retired
(Victoria (state)) Matthew Lobbe	Werribee	VFL	Delisted at the end of the season
(Western Australia) Jarrod Garlett			Delisted at the end of the season
(Victoria (state)) Pat Kerr	St Kevin's Old Boys	VAFA	Delisted at the end of the season
(Victoria (state)) Angus Schumacher	East Perth	WAFL	Delisted at the end of the season
(South Australia) Kym Lebois	North Adelaide	SANFL	Delisted from the rookie list at the end of the season
(Tasmania) Andrew Phillips	Essendon	AFL	AFL trade period, traded along with two fourth round draft picks (provisionally No. 61 and 72), in exchange for two higher fourth-round draft picks (provisionally No. 57 and 70)
(Western Australia) Josh Deluca	Box Hill	VFL	Delisted after the trade period.

=== List management ===
Player	Change
AFL Trade Period	Received a third round draft pick (provisionally No. 48) from Sydney in exchange for a later third round draft pick and a fourth round draft pick (provisionally No. 54 and 63).
National Draft	Bid for Fremantle Academy player Liam Henry with the No. 9 draft selection; the bid was matched by Fremantle.
National Draft	Bid for GWS Academy player Tom Green with the No. 10 draft selection; the bid was matched by GWS.
2019 National Draft live trading	Gained a first round draft selection (No. 17) and a second round draft selection (No. 22) from Gold Coast in exchange for a higher first round draft selection (No. 11). Pick 22 was then on-traded to Port Adelaide along with a fourth-round draft selection (No. 55) in exchange for a higher second-round selection (No. 20).
(Victoria (state)) Jordan Cunico (Victoria (state)) Callum Moore (Victoria (state)) Ryan Sturgess (Victoria (state)) Lukas Webb	All four players received permission to train with Carlton during the 2020 pre-season ahead of the supplemental selection period; Moore was ultimately added to the club's rookie list.

== Season summary ==
=== Pre-season ===
The club played three full-length practice matches in the lead-up to the season and prior to the announcement of the season's curtailment. The matches against Fremantle and Brisbane were scheduled as part of the Marsh Community Series, and the match against Collingwood was arranged between the clubs in late January with the gold coin entry donation fee serving as a fundraiser for the 2019–20 Australian bushfire relief effort.

**Date and local time**	**Opponent**	**Scores** (Carlton's scores indicated in **bold**)			**Venue**	**Attendance**
**Date and local time**	**Opponent**	Home	Away	Result	**Venue**	**Attendance**
Thursday, 20 February (4:00 pm)	Collingwood	**16.10 (106)**	11.8 (74)	Won by 32 points	Ikon Park (H)	N/A
Saturday, 29 February (7:10 pm)	Fremantle	13.12 (90)	**5.13 (43)**	Lost by 47 points	David Grays Arena (A)	5,127
Sunday, 8 March (6:40 pm)	Brisbane Lions	**10.6 (66)**	16.15 (111)	Lost by 45 points	Ikon Park (H)	7,148

=== Home and away season ===
Owing to the curtailment of the AFL season and uncertainty in the fixture, portions of the fixture were gradually released during the year, and sometimes changed at short notice. The only such change which affected Carlton was in Round 5: on the Monday prior to the game, Carlton's Saturday game against St Kilda was rescheduled to Thursday night, to fill the television timeslot left by a cancelled Richmond vs West Coast match; the venue was changed from the Melbourne Cricket Ground to Marvel Stadium.

Carlton had its best home-and-away season for seven years, carrying on from a successful second half to 2019. Carlton maintained consistent performance through the majority of the season, and had a 4–4 record through the first eight rounds, with many games decided by close margins. From Rounds 9 to 12, Carlton went into a hub in Perth, where it lost its first two matches against Hawthorn and West Coast after holding strong leads to fall to 4–6; but, a narrow victory against Fremantle to end the hub period and a comfortable win against Gold Coast the following week brought the club back to 6–6, and still in a position to challenge for finals.

The season's most critical juncture was in Rounds 14 and 15, when Carlton played consecutive matches five days apart against fellow eighth place aspirants Collingwood and Greater Western Sydney; but in both games, Carlton conceded four goals to none in the final quarter to lose after holding a final quarter lead, ending the club's realistic finals chances. A mathematical chance of finals remained until the Round 17 loss against wooden spooners Adelaide, and a 1–4 end to the season saw the club finish 11th, with a record of 7–10.

Across the entire season, Carlton's results were mostly in line with finishing position. Against the ten teams who finished above them, Carlton had a 2–8 record, winning against 4th placed Geelong and 7th placed Western Bulldogs; and, against the seven teams below them, Carlton had a 5–2 record, with upset losses against Hawthorn and Adelaide. The team was consistently competitive, and its heaviest defeat for the season was only 31 points – the lowest of any team in the league for the year.

In spite of this, it was a year of wild results and momentum swings. Twice, Carlton conceded the first seven goals yet fought back – for a 1-point loss against Melbourne in Round 2, and a 5-point win against Sydney in Round 16. Twice, Carlton blew huge leads: against Geelong in Round 3, Carlton led by 42 points before almost being overrun, winning by only two points; and against Hawthorn in Round 9, Carlton kicked the first five goals to lead by 31 points, before losing by the same amount. Two games were decided by goals after the final siren: a loss against Port Adelaide in Round 7 and a win against Fremantle in Round 12; and two wins – against Essendon in Round 4 and Sydney in Round 16 – were secured only after the opponent missed gettable set shots in the final minute.

**Rd**	**Date and local time**	**Opponent**	**Scores** (Carlton's scores indicated in **bold**)			**Venue**	**Attendance**	**Ladder** **position**
**Rd**	**Date and local time**	**Opponent**	Home	Away	Result	**Venue**	**Attendance**	**Ladder** **position**
1	Thursday, 19 March (7:40 pm)	Richmond	16.9 (105)	**12.9 (81)**	Lost by 24 points	Melbourne Cricket Ground (A)	Closed	13th
2	Saturday, 13 June (4:35 pm)	Melbourne	**7.11 (53)**	8.6 (54)	Lost by 1 point	Marvel Stadium (H)	Closed	16th
3	Saturday, 20 June (7:40 pm)	Geelong	11.11 (77)	**12.7 (79)**	Won by 2 points	GMHBA Stadium (A)	Closed	13th
4	Saturday, 27 June (7:40 pm)	Essendon	8.3 (51)	**7.10 (52)**	Won by 1 point	Melbourne Cricket Ground (A)	Closed	12th
5	Thursday, 2 July (7:40 pm)	St Kilda	**8.7 (55)**	11.7 (73)	Lost by 18 points	Marvel Stadium (H)	Closed	12th
6	Sunday, 12 July (6:45 pm)	Western Bulldogs	**16.7 (103)**	7.9 (51)	Won by 52 points	Metricon Stadium (H)	2,178	8th
7	Sunday, 19 July (1:05 pm)	Port Adelaide	**9.7 (61)**	9.10 (64)	Lost by 3 points	Gabba (H)	3,510	11th
8	Saturday, 25 July (1:05 pm)	North Melbourne	9.3 (57)	**9.10 (64)**	Won by 7 points	The Gabba (A)	3,655	11th
9	Friday, 31 July (3:40 pm)	Hawthorn	**9.4 (58)**	14.5 (89)	Lost by 31 points	Optus Stadium (H)	12,304	12th
10	Bye							13th
11	Sunday, 9 August (1:35 pm)	West Coast	11.6 (72)	**7.8 (50)**	Lost by 22 points	Optus Stadium (A)	19,092	13th
12	Saturday, 15 August (6:10 pm)	Fremantle	5.6 (36)	**5.10 (40)**	Won by 4 points	Optus Stadium (A)	24,114	12th
13	Friday, 21 August (7:20 pm)	Gold Coast	4.3 (27)	**7.18 (60)**	Won by 33 points	TIO Stadium (A)	5,172	10th
14	Sunday, 30 August (3:35 pm)	Collingwood	**7.6 (48)**	10.12 (72)	Lost by 24 points	Gabba (H)	9,033	12th
15	Thursday, 3 September (7:10 pm)	GWS	6.12 (48)	**5.9 (39)**	Lost by 9 points	Metricon Stadium (A)	1,469	12th
16	Tuesday, 8 September (8:10 pm)	Sydney	**8.9 (57)**	8.4 (52)	Won by 5 points	Metricon Stadium (H)	1,580	11th
17	Sunday, 13 September (1:05 pm)	Adelaide	**8.8 (56)**	10.12 (72)	Lost by 16 points	Metricon Stadium (H)	2,735	12th
18	Saturday, 19 September (7:40pm)	Brisbane	11.12 (78)	**10.1 (61)**	Lost by 17 points	Gabba (A)	14,563	11th

== Team awards and records ==
Game records and awards

Several marks in low scoring were set across the AFL during the season, in large part due to matches being played with 16 minute quarters instead of 20 minute quarters.

- Round 4 – Carlton's score of 7.10 (52) against Essendon was its lowest winning score since Round 12, 1989.
- Round 4 – the club won the Madden Cup as winners of its rivalry game against Essendon.
- Round 12 – Carlton's score of 5.10 (40) in wet conditions against Fremantle was its lowest winning score since Round 12, 1977.
- Round 12 - Fremantle's score of 5.6 (36) was Carlton's lowest score conceded since Round 22, 2001.
- Round 12 – The aggregate score of 76 points in the match against Fremantle was the lowest in any Carlton game since Round 11, 1991.
- Round 13 - Gold Coast's score of 4.3 (27) was, for the second consecutive week, Carlton's lowest score conceded since Round 22, 2001.
- Round 13 – Gold Coast's seven scoring shots was the fewest conceded by Carlton in a game since Round 13, 1987.
- Rounds 12–13 – The combined 63 points scored by Fremantle and Gold Coast was the fewest total points conceded in consecutive games by Carlton since Rounds 4–5, 1919.
- Round 15 – GWS' score of 6.12 (48) was the lowest score against which Carlton had lost a game since Round 15, 1965.

Game events

- Round 7 – Carlton lost by three points against Port Adelaide after Robbie Gray (Port Adelaide) kicked a goal after the final siren, from a 45m set shot near the boundary line. It was the first time Carlton had lost on an after-the-siren kick since Round 10, 2002.
- Round 12 – Carlton won by four points against Fremantle after Jack Newnes kicked a goal after the final siren, from a 45m set shot outside the boundary line. It was the first time Carlton had won on an after-the-siren kick since Round 22, 1987.

Season records

- The club's win–loss record of 7–10, finishing position of 11th, and percentage of 94.3 were all the best the club had achieved since 2013.
- The club's heaviest defeat of the year of 31 points was its narrowest heaviest defeat since 1988.

== Individual awards and records ==
=== John Nicholls Medal ===
The Carlton Football Club Best and Fairest awards night took place on 19 February 2021, the club opting to defer the ceremony until well into 2021 in the hope of staging it free in the usual manner and free from the tight COVID-19 restrictions present during the month after the season. The John Nicholls Medal, for the best and fairest player of the club, as well as several other awards, were presented on the night.

John Nicholls Medal

The winner of the John Nicholls Medal was Jacob Weitering, who polled 137 votes to win the award for the first time in his career. Sam Walsh finished second in just his second season with the club, polling 126 votes; and Ed Curnow finished third with 103 votes to become the first player since Chris Judd (2010–2012) to finish in the top three in three consecutive seasons.

Pos.	Player	Votes
1st	Jacob Weitering	137
2nd	Sam Walsh	126
3rd	Ed Curnow	103
4th	Lachie Plowman	95
5th	Liam Jones	83
6th	Jack Martin	81
7th	Sam Docherty	76
8th	Levi Casboult	75
9th	Patrick Cripps	73
10th	Kade Simpson	63

Other awards

The following other awards were presented on John Nicholls Medal night:-

- Best Young Player – Tom de Koning
- Best Clubman – Nic Newman
- Spirit of Carlton Award – Marc Pittonet
- Bill Lanyon Inner Blue Ruthless Award – Jacob Weitering
- Carltonians William A. Cook Award – Sam Walsh
- Coaches' Award – Jack Martin
- Most Valuable Bluebagger Award – Liam Jones

The 'Best Young Player' award replaced the long-standing 'Best First Year Player' award, with less stringent qualification criteria.

=== Leading goalkickers ===
Harry McKay was Carlton's leading goalkicker for the season, kicking 21 goals. It was McKay's second consecutive season as leading goalkicker – the first time a player had achieved back-to-back leading goalkicker titles for the club since Brendan Fevola in 2008 and 2009. In the shortened season, it was the fewest goals to win the title since Ian Nankervis in 1964.

Player	Goals	Behinds
Harry McKay (footballer)	21	15
Levi Casboult	16	8
Eddie Betts	13	13
Jack Newnes	13	4
Jack Martin	12	11

=== Other awards ===
AFL Coaches' Association awards

- Sam Walsh won the AFL Coaches' Association Best Young Player award for the two-year period of 2019–2020, polling 64 votes to win comfortably ahead of Connor Rozee (Port Adelaide) who polled 33 votes.

Honorific teams

- All-Australian team – one Carlton player, Jacob Weitering, was nominated in the 40-man squad for the 2020 All Australian team. He was not selected in the final team of 22.
- 22under22 team – two Carlton players – Sam Walsh and Jacob Weitering – were named in the 22under22 team for the 2020 season. It was Weitering's third time selected in the team, and he was named vice-captain; and it was Walsh's second selection. Harry McKay was also nominated in the original 40-man squad. The final 22-man team will be announced on 22 September.

Mark of the Year

- Sam Walsh was the winner of the AFL Mark of the Year award, for a courageous overhead mark taken running back with the flight of the ball into a pack of four players in the Round 7 match against Port Adelaide. Walsh was Carlton's first Mark of the Year winner since 1999.

Goal of the Year

Two Carlton players were among the final three nominees for Goal of the Year:

- Jack Newnes, for the 50m after the siren set shot from the boundary line which secured Carlton's Round 12 victory against Fremantle.
- Patrick Cripps, for his goal in Round 17 against Adelaide, in which he had three attempts at a clearance from a centre wing stoppage before gathering, cradling the ball behind his back to spin out of trouble, dodged another player with a one-two to Eddie Betts, baulked another player then kicked a goal on the run from 50m.

Both players were defeated by Josh Daicos (Collingwood) for the award.

Club records

- Round 4 – Kade Simpson played his 329th senior game for the club, surpassing John Nicholls to become the player with the third-most games in the history of the club.
- Round 7 – Eddie Betts kicked his 300th goal for Carlton, becoming the 13th player to reach the milestone. In doing so, he became the third player in VFL/AFL history to have scored more than 300 goals for two different clubs – having also kicked 310 with Adelaide.

Representative honours

The following Carlton players were selected for representative teams during the 2020 season.

- In the State of Origin for Bushfire Relief Match for the All-Stars: Eddie Betts and Patrick Cripps.

== Women's teams ==
=== AFL Women's ===
Squad

Daniel Harford retained his position as senior coach of the team. With the departure of former captain Brianna Davey to Collingwood, Katie Loynes and Kerryn Harrington were appointed joint captains of the team for the 2020 season.

The club's 2020 squad is given below. The number of games played and goals scored in the 2020 season is given in parentheses.

Carlton Football Club (AFL Women's)
Senior list		Coaching staff
1 Grace Egan (7,2); 2 Katie Loynes (c) (7,1); 3 Darcy Vescio (7,4); 4 Maddy Prespakis (7,3); 5 Abbie McKay (0,0); 6 Gab Pound (7,0); 7 Tayla Harris (7,8); 8 Vaomua Laloifi (7,0); 9 Kerryn Harrington (c) (7,0); 10 Sarah Hosking (7,2); 11 Jess Hosking (6,0); 12 Lauren Brazzale (7,2); 13 Lucy McEvoy (7,3); 14 Brooke Walker (7,5)	15 Chloe Dalton (7,0); 16 Breann Moody (7,0); 18 Katie Harrison (0,0); 19 Georgia Gee (7,8); 20 Charlotte Wilson (6,0); 21 Nicola Stevens (7,3); 22 Courtney Jones (0,0); 23 Sharnie Whiting (0,0); 25 Jess Edwards (5,0); 26 Joanne Doonan (2,0); 27 Emerson Woods (0,0); 30 Alison Downie (7,1); 31 Brooke Vernon (1,0); 32 Natalie Plane (7,0); 33 Serena Gibbs (0,0); 36 Jayde Van Dyk (1,0)	**Head coach**: Daniel Harford; **Assistant coaches**: Steven Salopek (backline); Shannon McFerran (midfield); Brad Fisher (forwards); Adam Dancey (Skills and Development); Legend: (c) Captain(s); (vc) Vice-captain(s); Updated: Source(s): Senior list, Coaching staff

Season

Carlton was placed in Conference B for the 2020 season. When the home-and-away season was cancelled after six rounds, Carlton finished second in the conference with a record of 5–1.

**Rd**	**Date and local time**	**Opponent**	**Scores** (Carlton's scores indicated in **bold**)			**Venue**	**Attendance**
**Rd**	**Date and local time**	**Opponent**	Home	Away	Result	**Venue**	**Attendance**
1	Friday, 7 February (7:40 pm)	Richmond	2.2 (14)	**6.12 (48)**	Won by 34 points	Ikon Park (A)	15,337
2	Sunday, 16 February (3:10 pm)	Collingwood	**3.6 (24)**	6.3 (39)	Lost by 15 points	Ikon Park (H)	7,529
3	Saturday, 22 February (3:10 pm)	Western Bulldogs	4.6 (30)	**8.3 (51)**	Won by 21 points	VU Whitten Oval (A)	8,259
4	Sunday, 1 March (1:10 pm)	Adelaide	4.4 (28)	**5.6 (36)**	Won by 8 points	Hisense Stadium (A)	7,281
5	Saturday, 7 March (7:10 pm)	St Kilda	**8.2 (50)**	4.5 (29)	Won by 21 points	Ikon Park (H)	3,871
6	Saturday, 14 March (7:40 pm)	Melbourne	3.6 (24)	**6.4 (40)**	Won by 16 points	TIO Traeger Park (A)	Closed
7	Saturday, 21 March (1:10 pm)	West Coast			Match cancelled	Ikon Park (H)	
8	Saturday, 28 March (1:10 pm)	Fremantle			Match cancelled	Marvel Stadium (H)	

Finals

Finishing second in Conference B after the curtailed home-and-away season, Carlton qualified for the semi-finals, hosting Brisbane, who had finished third in Conference A. Carlton had a comfortable win against Brisbane in the semi-final, gaining the lead in the second quarter and extending its advantage in each quarter thereafter before winning by 29 points.

This was to set up a preliminary final match against first placed Conference A team Kangaroos, but the season was cancelled before this match could be played.

**Rd**	**Date and local time**	**Opponent**	**Scores** (Carlton's scores indicated in **bold**)			**Venue**	**Attendance**
**Rd**	**Date and local time**	**Opponent**	Home	Away	Result	**Venue**	**Attendance**
Semi final	Sunday, 22 March (1:10 pm)	Brisbane	**6.8 (44)**	2.3 (15)	Won by 29 points	Ikon Park (H)	Closed
Preliminary final		Kangaroos			Match cancelled		

Notable events

- Richmond's home game against Carlton was shifted from Richmond's home ground, the Swinburne Centre, to Ikon Park because the crowd was anticipated to exceed Swinburne Centre's capacity.

Conference B
Pos	Team	Pld	W	L	D	PF	PA	PP	Pts
1	Fremantle	6	6	0	0	277	179	154.7	24
2	Carlton	6	5	1	0	249	164	151.8	20
3	Melbourne	6	4	2	0	204	124	164.5	16
4	Collingwood	6	4	2	0	229	149	153.7	16
5	St Kilda	6	2	4	0	154	170	90.6	8
6	Western Bulldogs	6	1	5	0	179	246	72.8	4
7	West Coast	6	1	5	0	77	232	33.2	4

Updated to match(es) played on unknown. Source: womens.afl
Rules for classification: 1) points; 2) percentage; 3) number of points for.

League Awards

The following individual awards and honours were won by Carlton players:

- Maddy Prespakis won the league best and fairest, polling 15 out of a possible 18 votes to win by a margin of three from Fremantle's Kiara Bowers.
- Maddy Prespakis, Tayla Harris and Kerryn Harrington were all named in the 2020 AFL Women's All-Australian team. Georgia Gee was also nominated in the 40-woman squad.
- Maddy Prespakis, Georgia Gee and Charlotte Wilson were all named in the women's 22under22 team, with Prespakis named vice captain.

Club Awards

- Maddy Prespakis won the club's best and fairest award for the second consecutive season, after having shared the award with Brianna Davey in 2019. Prespakis polled 74 votes to win the award ahead of Chloe Dalton (56 votes) and Georgia Gee (43 votes).
- Georgia Gee won the club's Rising Star award as the most improved player.
- Grace Egan won the Best First Year Player award.
- Jess Edwards won the Carlton Way Blue Bloods award as best club woman.

=== VFL Women's ===
Carlton's VFL Women's team was set to contest the VFL Women's competition for the third time; however, the season was cancelled due to the coronavirus pandemic.
