= Liam Stocker =

Australian rules footballer

Personal information
- Born: 23 January 2000 (age 26); Camperdown, New South Wales
- Original team: Sandringham Dragons
- Draft: No. 19, 2018 National Draft
- Debut: 5 May 2019, Carlton vs. North Melbourne, at Marvel Stadium
- Height: 184 cm (6 ft 0 in)
- Weight: 83 kg (183 lb)
- Position: Defender

Club information
- Current club: St Kilda
- Number: 14

Playing career^{1}
Years	Club	Games (Goals)
2019–2022	Carlton	28 (2)
2023–	St Kilda	72 (0)
Total		100 (2)
- ^{1} Playing statistics correct to the end of round 22, 2026.

Career highlights
- Morrish Medal Winner: 2018

Liam Stocker (born 23 January 2000) is an Australian rules footballer who plays for the St Kilda Football Club in the Australian Football League (AFL), having initially been drafted to the Carlton Football Club. He was recruited with the 19th overall selection in the 2018 National Draft and was the first player to be drafted via a 'live trade'. Liam is from Victoria, and played for the Sandringham Dragons in the TAC Cup before being picked to represent Vic Metro at the 2018 AFL Under 18 Championships.

== Early life and junior career ==
Liam was born in Camperdown, New South Wales, Australia. His family moved to Beijing, China when Liam was 4 after his dad was given a job opportunity. Liam lived there until moving back to Australia at Sandringham in bayside Melbourne when he was 10. He completed his schooling in 2017 at Haileybury College. He started playing junior football at East Sandringham Zebras Junior Football Club in the South Metro Junior Football League.

Liam played for the Sandringham Dragons in the TAC Cup. In 2018, he had a standout season, averaging 22 disposals, 13 contested possessions, and 5 clearances. What stood out to a lot of people was his endurance, professionalism and ability to kick the ball well on both feet. He was awarded the Morrish Medal, the best and fairest award for the TAC Cup, but sustained a jaw injury which saw him miss the AFL Under 18 Championships. Nevertheless, he was still chosen by Vic Metro as one of their top prospects for the draft. A shoulder injury struck again and he missed the combine, leading him to admit that he 'had plans to TAC Cup footy next year'.

== AFL career ==
Liam Stocker was selected by Carlton at No. 19 of the 2018 National draft. His recruitment made national headlines as he was the first player to be picked using the then-new system allowing draft picks to be traded live during draft night: Carlton made a live trade with the Adelaide Crows which saw the Blues receive Stocker's pick in exchange for the two clubs exchanging their first round picks in the following season's draft. For the early part of Stocker's debut season, the bold decision looked likely to backfire badly, and as late as Round 13, Adelaide was sitting in the top four while Carlton was on the bottom of the ladder, opening the possibility that it would lose the 2019 No. 1 selection for a low first-round pick; however, stronger end-of-season form saw it rise to 16th, and Adelaide lost seven of its last nine games to fall to 11th, such that in the end Carlton had traded pick No. 4 for Stocker and pick No. 9 (which in turn was traded for the picks which secured Brodie Kemp and Sam Philp).

Stocker made his AFL debut in round 7 of the 2019 season, in a loss to North Melbourne, and finished the season with five games and averaging 14 disposals. He signed a 3-year contract keeping him at the club until 2022. He did not play a senior match in the COVID-19 pandemic-interrupted 2020 season – he ruled himself out after electing to return to Victoria when the club was forced to spend much of the season living on the Gold Coast to avoid interstate travel restrictions associated with the pandemic, later revealing that the move to the interstate hub had been a tipping point which exacerbated mental health issues he had been suffering for several years prior. Stocker had his most successful season for Carlton in 2021, playing 17 of 22 games; but, after being selected for only six matches in 2022, he was delisted at the end of the season.

Stocker then joined St Kilda as a rookie during the supplemental selection period (SSP) ahead of the 2023 AFL season.

== Player profile ==
An inside midfielder, Stocker's main qualities are his frame and his knack for getting the ball out of contests. Adept at kicking the ball on both feet, Stocker is also a scoreboard threat, using his versatility to attack the opposition around most of the playing area. Averaging 4 tackles in the TAC Cup and 5 clearances, he showed his grunt useful on the inside of contests along with his class on the outside.

== Statistics ==
Updated to the end of round 22, 2026.

Legend
G	Goals	K	Kicks	D	Disposals	T	Tackles
B	Behinds	H	Handballs	M	Marks

Season	Team	No.	Games	Totals							Averages (per game)							Votes
Season	Team	No.	Games	G	B	K	H	D	M	T	G	B	K	H	D	M	T	Votes
2019	Carlton	13	5	0	0	42	26	68	12	9	0.0	0.0	8.4	5.2	13.6	2.4	1.8	0
2020 (Note: The 2020 season was played with 17 home-and-away matches per team (down from 22) and 16-minute quarters with time on (down from 20-minute quarters with time on) due to the impact of the COVID-19 pandemic.)	Carlton	13	0	—	—	—	—	—	—	—	—	—	—	—	—	—	—	0
2021	Carlton	13	17	2	1	163	75	238	58	37	0.1	0.1	9.6	4.4	14.0	3.4	2.2	0
2022	Carlton	13	6	0	0	45	21	66	12	11	0.0	0.0	7.5	3.5	11.0	2.0	1.8	0
2023	St Kilda	14	23	0	2	239	153	392	145	39	0.0	0.1	10.4	6.7	17.0	6.3	1.7	0
2024	St Kilda	14	16	0	2	108	85	193	67	36	0.0	0.1	6.8	5.3	12.1	4.2	2.3	0
2025	St Kilda	14	17	0	0	118	71	189	70	32	0.0	0.0	6.9	4.2	11.1	4.1	1.9	0
2026	St Kilda	14	16	0	0	127	87	214	71	25	0.0	0.0	7.9	5.4	13.4	4.4	1.6	0
Career			100	2	5	842	518	1360	435	189	0.0	0.1	8.4	5.2	13.6	4.4	1.9	0
