= Jessica Edwards (footballer) =

Australian rules footballer

Jess Edwards
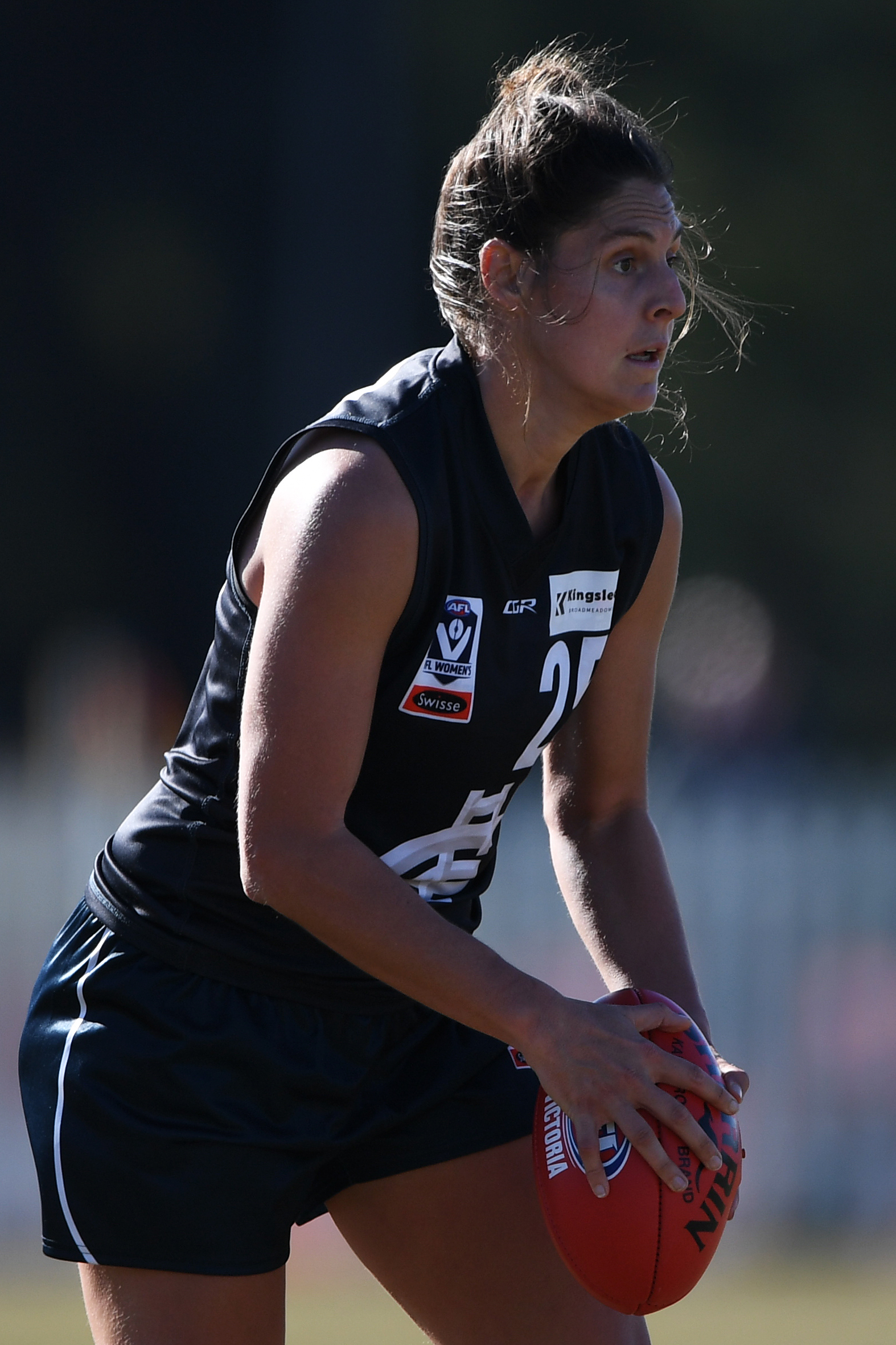
- Edwards with Carlton in June 2019

Personal information
- Full name: Jessica Edwards
- Born: 20 September 1989 (age 37)
- Original team: Collingwood (VFLW)
- Draft: No. 42, 2018 AFLW draft
- Debut: Round 1, 2019, Carlton vs. North Melbourne, at North Hobart Oval
- Height: 171 cm (5 ft 7 in)
- Position: Defender

Playing career^{1}
Years	Club	Games (Goals)
2019–2021	Carlton	14 (1)
- ^{1} Playing statistics correct to the end of the 2021 season.

Jessica 'Jess' Edwards (born 20 September 1989) is a former Australian rules footballer who played for Carlton in the AFL Women's (AFLW) between 2019 and 2021.

== Early life ==
Edwards was raised in South Australia. Edwards began playing Ladies' Gaelic football as a junior. In 2016 Edwards switched codes and played with the Wandsworth Demons in AFL London before moving to Australia in 2017. Edwards moved to Adelaide and captained North Adelaide Football Club women's team in the SAWFL in 2017. In 2018 Edwards captained the Adelaide University to the SAWFL Grand Final and captained Collingwood in the VFL Women's competition (VFLW) in 2018. Edwards was drafted by Carlton with the 42nd pick overall in the 2018 AFLW draft.

== AFLW career ==
Edwards debuted in the opening round of the 2019 season and played in the 2019 AFL Women's Grand Final.

Edwards returned to Adelaide in 2022 and won a SANFLW premiership with North Adelaide as captain. She retired following the 2024 SANFLW season.
