= Jordan Boyd =

Australian rules footballer

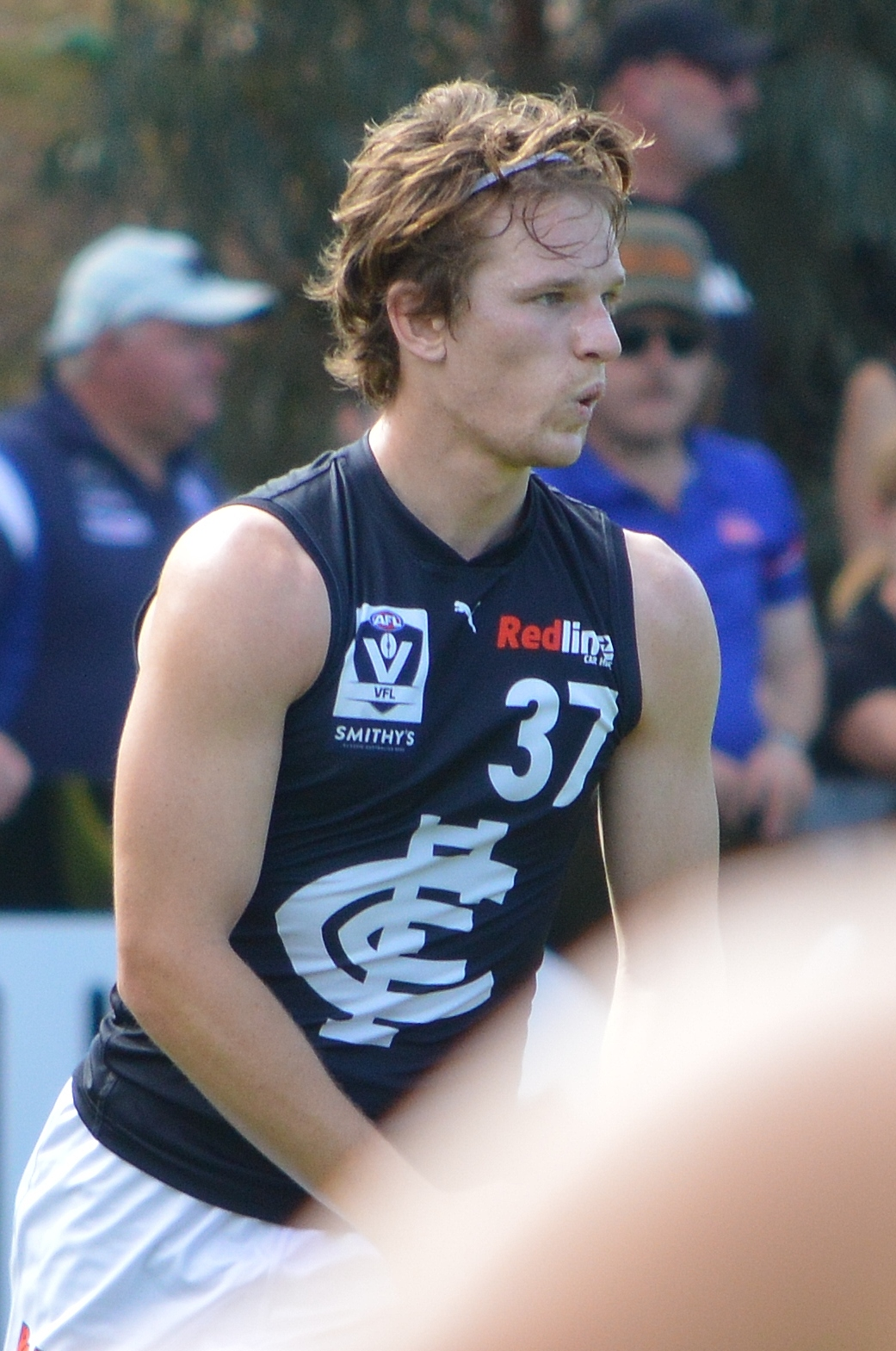
- Boyd with Carlton's VFL side in April 2025

Personal information
- Born: 22 September 1998 (age 28)
- Original teams: Spotswood (WRFL); Footscray (VFL)
- Draft: No. 20, 2021 mid-season rookie draft
- Debut: Round 3, 2022, Carlton vs. Hawthorn, at Melbourne Cricket Ground
- Height: 182 cm (6 ft 0 in)
- Weight: 80 kg (176 lb)
- Position: Back pocket

Playing career^{1}
| Years | Club | Games (Goals) |
| 2021–2026 | Carlton | 40 (1) |
- ^{1} Playing statistics correct to the end of the 2026 season.

Jordan Boyd (born 22 September 1998) is a former professional Australian rules footballer who played for the Carlton Football Club in the Australian Football League (AFL).

== Early career ==
Boyd played his junior football for Western Region Football League club Spotswood. He went through the Maribyrnong Sports Academy's AFL program, and worked through the reserves to become a senior player at Spotswood by 2018 – which even he believed at the time was the highest level his football career would reach. Throughout his junior career, he was never part of the AFL's elite talent junior pathways and never played in the NAB League – something which was very rare among footballers who played in the AFL in the 2020s.

In 2019, Boyd was given a chance to play with Footscray (the Western Bulldogs reserves team) in the Victorian Football League. The COVID-19 pandemic put a stop to all competitive football in Melbourne during 2020, and he again played games with Footscray in the first half of 2021.

== AFL career ==
Boyd was drafted to the AFL by Carlton at No. 20 in the 2021 mid-season rookie draft. He played his first AFL game in round 3, 2022, playing seven games that year before two foot fractures ended his season. He returned to the senior team in round 10, 2023, playing nine games that year.

From as early as his time at Spotswood, Boyd's greatest strength was noted as his long, accurate kicking. He began his senior career as a medium forward, but by 2023 was being used primarily as a rebounding defender.

Boyd was delisted at the end of the 2026 AFL season.

== Statistics ==
Updated to the end of the 2026 season.

Legend
| G | Goals | K | Kicks | D | Disposals | T | Tackles |
| B | Behinds | H | Handballs | M | Marks |

| Season | Team | No. | Games | Totals | | | | | | | Averages (per game) | | | | | | | Votes |
| Season | Team | No. | Games | G | B | K | H | D | M | T | G | B | K | H | D | M | T | Votes |
|---|---|---|---|---|---|---|---|---|---|---|---|---|---|---|---|---|---|---|
| 2021 | Carlton | 37 | 0 | — | — | — | — | — | — | — | — | — | — | — | — | — | — | 0 |
| 2022 | Carlton | 37 | 7 | 0 | 1 | 51 | 28 | 79 | 21 | 13 | 0.0 | 0.1 | 7.3 | 4.0 | 11.3 | 3.0 | 1.9 | 0 |
| 2023 | Carlton | 37 | 9 | 0 | 2 | 83 | 29 | 112 | 26 | 21 | 0.0 | 0.2 | 9.2 | 3.2 | 12.4 | 2.9 | 2.3 | 0 |
| 2024 | Carlton | 37 | 19 | 1 | 3 | 203 | 59 | 262 | 77 | 44 | 0.1 | 0.2 | 10.7 | 3.1 | 13.8 | 4.1 | 2.3 | 0 |
| 2025 | Carlton | 37 | 3 | 0 | 0 | 19 | 7 | 26 | 6 | 2 | 0.0 | 0.0 | 6.3 | 2.3 | 8.7 | 2.0 | 0.7 | 0 |
| 2026 | Carlton | 37 | 2 | 0 | 0 | 26 | 3 | 29 | 10 | 6 | 0.0 | 0.0 | 13.0 | 1.5 | 14.5 | 5.0 | 3.0 | 0 |
| Career | | | 40 | 1 | 6 | 382 | 126 | 508 | 140 | 86 | 0.0 | 0.2 | 9.6 | 3.2 | 12.7 | 3.5 | 2.2 | 0 |
