= Matt Cottrell =

Australian football league player

Personal information
- Born: 29 February 2000 (age 26)
- Original team: Dandenong Stingrays
- Draft: 2019 Pre-season supplemental selection period
- Debut: 9 August 2020, Carlton vs. West Coast, at Perth Stadium
- Height: 185 cm (6 ft 1 in)
- Weight: 80 kg (176 lb)
- Position: Midfielder

Club information
- Current club: Carlton
- Number: 46

Playing career^{1}
Years	Club	Games (Goals)
2019–	Carlton	88 (42)
- ^{1} Playing statistics correct to the end of the 2026 season.

Matthew Cottrell (born 29 February 2000) is an Australian rules footballer who plays for the Carlton Football Club in the Australian Football League (AFL). He was recruited by the Carlton Football Club through the 2019 Pre-season supplemental selection period.

== Early football ==
Cottrell played football for the Pearcedale Football Club. He played for the Dandenong Stingrays in the NAB League for the 2017 and 2018 seasons. Although Cottrell only played 2 games in 2017, he cemented his spot in 2018 and played 19 games. He is the grandson of former Carlton player Len Cottrell.

== AFL career ==
Cottrell was not selected in either the national or rookie draft, but trained with and was then recruited to the Carlton Football Club in February 2019 in the pre-season supplemental selection period. After playing his entire first season in Carlton's VFL-affiliate, the Northern Blues, he made his senior AFL debut in Round 11, 2020, against West Coast in one of three matches Carlton played in a Perth quarantine hub during the pandemic-interrupted 2020 season. Later that season, in just his fifth career match, Cottrell kicked the winning goal two minutes from the final siren a come-from-behind victory against Sydney, in which Carlton conceded the first seven goals of the game before recovering to win 8.9 (57) to 8.4 (52). Cottrell was elevated to Carlton's senior list from their rookie list for 2024 in late 2023, following an outbreak season in the Blues' first finals campaign since 2013, in which he kicked 11 goals, including 3 in his first finals campaign.

== Statistics ==
Updated to the end of the 2026 season.

Legend
G	Goals	K	Kicks	D	Disposals	T	Tackles
B	Behinds	H	Handballs	M	Marks

Season	Team	No.	Games	Totals							Averages (per game)							Votes
Season	Team	No.	Games	G	B	K	H	D	M	T	G	B	K	H	D	M	T	Votes
2019	Carlton	46	0	—	—	—	—	—	—	—	—	—	—	—	—	—	—	0
2020 (Note: The 2020 season was played with 17 home-and-away matches per team (down from 22) and 16-minute quarters with time on (down from 20-minute quarters with time on) due to the impact of the COVID-19 pandemic.)	Carlton	46	5	2	0	44	9	53	8	4	0.4	0.0	8.8	1.8	10.6	1.6	0.8	0
2021	Carlton	46	14	3	2	118	47	165	37	31	0.2	0.1	8.4	3.4	11.8	2.6	2.2	0
2022	Carlton	46	18	9	2	159	108	267	71	32	0.5	0.1	8.8	6.0	14.8	3.9	1.8	0
2023	Carlton	46	17	11	11	160	78	238	72	34	0.6	0.6	9.4	4.6	14.0	4.2	2.0	0
2024	Carlton	46	14	9	5	100	52	152	45	27	0.6	0.4	7.1	3.7	10.9	3.2	1.9	0
2025	Carlton	46	6	2	5	70	29	99	23	11	0.3	0.8	11.7	4.8	16.5	3.8	1.8	0
2026	Carlton	46	14	6	9	131	74	205	51	35	0.4	0.6	9.4	5.3	14.6	3.6	2.5	0
Career			88	42	34	782	397	1179	307	174	0.5	0.4	8.9	4.5	13.4	3.5	2.0	0
