= Josh Honey =

Australian football league player

Personal information
- Born: 17 October 2001 (age 25)
- Original team: Western Jets
- Draft: No.3, 2020 AFL rookie draft, Carlton
- Debut: 15 August 2020, Carlton vs. Fremantle, at Perth Stadium
- Height: 186 cm (6 ft 1 in)
- Weight: 84 kg (185 lb)
- Position: Forward

Playing career^{1}
| Years | Club | Games (Goals) |
| 2020–2023 | Carlton | 17 (10) |
- ^{1} Playing statistics correct to the end of the 2023 season.

Josh Honey (born 17 October 2001) is an Australian rules footballer who last played for the Carlton Football Club in the Australian Football League (AFL).

== Early football ==
Honey played in Division 1 for the Keilor Football Club in the Essendon District Football League. After a strong performance for Keilor, he was selected to play for the Western Jets in the NAB League. He played 26 games, kicked 32 goals and averaged 13.5 disposals over his two seasons. He represented Vic Metro in the AFL Under 18 Championships in the 2019 season, where he played two games, kicked two goals and averaged 9.5 disposals.

== AFL career ==
Honey was recruited by the Carlton Football Club with the 3rd draft pick in the 2020 AFL rookie draft. He made his debut in Carlton's after the siren four point win against Fremantle in Round 12, 2020, kicking one behind and collecting four disposals in his only match of the season. He played five senior matches in 2021, and was subsequently elevated to the club's senior list from 2022.

He was delisted at the end of the 2023 season after 17 AFL games.

== Statistics ==
Statistics are correct to the end of 2021

Legend
| G | Goals | K | Kicks | D | Disposals | T | Tackles |
| B | Behinds | H | Handballs | M | Marks |

font-weight:bold; width:2em"

| Season | Team | No. | Games | Totals | | | | | | | Averages (per game) | | | | | | |
| Season | Team | No. | Games | G | B | K | H | D | M | T | G | B | K | H | D | M | T |
|---|---|---|---|---|---|---|---|---|---|---|---|---|---|---|---|---|---|
| 2020 | Carlton | 36 | 1 | 0 | 1 | 3 | 1 | 4 | 2 | 1 | 0.0 | 1.0 | 3.0 | 1.0 | 4.0 | 2.0 | 1.0 |
| 2021 | Carlton | 36 | 5 | 6 | 3 | 24 | 12 | 36 | 13 | 6 | 1.2 | 0.6 | 4.8 | 2.4 | 7.2 | 2.6 | 1.2 |
| Career | | | 6 | 6 | 4 | 27 | 13 | 40 | 15 | 7 | 1.0 | 0.6 | 4.5 | 2.1 | 6.6 | 2.5 | 1.1 |
