= Jack Martin (Australian footballer) =

Australian rules footballer (born 1995)

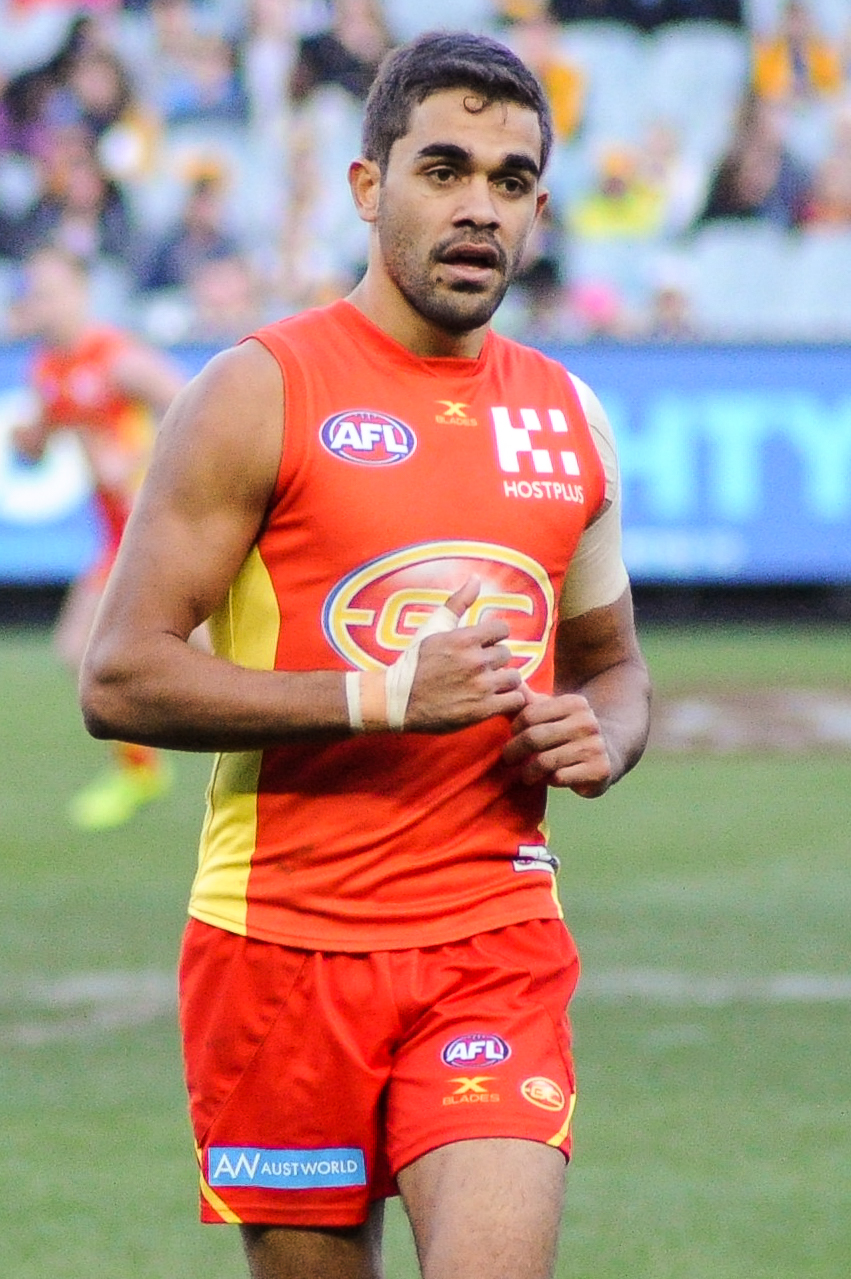
- Martin playing for Gold Coast in 2017.

Personal information
- Full name: Jack Martin
- Born: 29 January 1995 (age 31); Broome, Western Australia
- Original team: Claremont (WAFL)
- Draft: #1, 2012 Mini Draft, Gold Coast
- Height: 186 cm (6 ft 1 in)
- Weight: 82 kg (181 lb)
- Position: Forward

Club information
- Current club: Geelong
- Number: 19

Playing career^{1}
Years	Club	Games (Goals)
2014–2019	Gold Coast	97 (81)
2020–2024	Carlton	54 (52)
2025–	Geelong	31 (34)
Total		182 (167)

Representative team honours
Years	Team	Games (Goals)
2015	Indigenous All-Stars	1 (0)
- ^{1} Playing statistics correct to the end of 2026.

Career highlights
- 2014 AFL Rising Star: nominee; 2× 22under22 team: 2016, 2017

Jack Martin (born 29 January 1995) is an Australian rules footballer who plays for the Geelong Football Club in the Australian Football League.

== Early life ==
Martin was born in Broome, Western Australia to an Indigenous Australian mother (Yawuru) and father (Yamatji). The family moved to Geraldton, Western Australia when Jack was 12 years of age. He attended Geraldton Senior College during his high school years.

Martin made his senior football debut for the Towns Football Club in the Great Northern Football League at age 15. His team would reach the GNFL Grand Final later that year and he would line up on future Gold Coast Suns teammate Jaeger O'Meara on the wing. He was recruited from Claremont Football Club, who played in the West Australian Football League with the first selection in the 2012 incentive Mini Draft, a special draft of players who were too young to be eligible for selection in the main 2012 AFL draft. Gold Coast obtained the first selection in the mini draft by trading their first selection, the second overall, to Greater Western Sydney.

As part of the mini-draft rules, Martin was unable to play for the Gold Coast Suns in the 2013 season, but did play for them in the 2013 NAB Cup preseason competition and then with the reserve team in the North East Australian Football League.

== AFL career ==
Martin made his AFL debut in Round 1 of the 2014 season against Richmond at Metricon Stadium. While attempting to take a diving mark in the fifth minute of the game, Martin injured his left AC joint and was subsequently substituted out of the game. It was initially feared he may be sidelined for the entire 2014 season, but scans later revealed he would miss a minimum of two months. He was rushed back into the senior team for the Round 14 clash against Geelong despite not having played a game at any level since his injury.

At the conclusion of the 2018 AFL season, Martin requested a trade from Gold Coast to a Victorian club. Essendon confirmed interest in signing Martin, but Gold Coast were not open to a trade. Martin played the 2019 AFL season at Gold Coast.

At the conclusion of the 2019 AFL season, Martin again requested a trade to Victoria. Carlton and the Western Bulldogs were both interested in signing him. He was expected to nominate Carlton as his preferred destination. After the Suns and Carlton failed to reach a deal during the trade period, Martin became a Blue in the 2019 pre-season draft.

On 13 September 2024, after only managing 54 games in his five seasons at the club, Martin was delisted by the Blues. He was ultimately signed by Geelong as a delisted free agent in November 2024.

== Statistics ==
Updated to the end of round 22, 2026.

Legend
G	Goals	K	Kicks	D	Disposals	T	Tackles
B	Behinds	H	Handballs	M	Marks

Season	Team	No.	Games	Totals							Averages (per game)							Votes
Season	Team	No.	Games	G	B	K	H	D	M	T	G	B	K	H	D	M	T	Votes
2014	Gold Coast	4	11	10	4	77	47	124	33	25	0.9	0.4	7.0	4.3	11.3	3.0	2.3	0
2015	Gold Coast	4	12	11	9	90	63	153	54	39	0.9	0.8	7.5	5.3	12.8	4.5	3.3	0
2016	Gold Coast	4	21	14	3	194	148	342	120	75	0.7	0.1	9.2	7.0	16.3	5.7	3.6	0
2017	Gold Coast	4	22	24	11	262	148	410	139	59	1.1	0.5	11.9	6.7	18.6	6.3	2.7	0
2018	Gold Coast	4	15	14	11	174	93	267	70	73	0.9	0.7	11.6	6.2	17.8	4.7	4.9	1
2019	Gold Coast	4	16	8	11	185	105	290	66	89	0.5	0.7	11.6	6.6	18.1	4.1	5.6	5
2020 (Note: The 2020 season was played with 17 home-and-away matches per team (down from 22) and 16-minute quarters with time on (down from 20-minute quarters with time on) due to the impact of the COVID-19 pandemic.)	Carlton	21	15	12	11	115	87	202	64	48	0.8	0.7	7.7	5.8	13.5	4.3	3.2	4
2021	Carlton	21	11	8	6	94	46	140	61	26	0.7	0.5	8.5	4.2	12.7	5.5	2.4	0
2022	Carlton	21	12	12	11	74	40	114	40	31	1.0	0.9	6.2	3.3	9.5	3.3	2.6	0
2023	Carlton	21	13	17	10	75	67	142	46	31	1.3	0.8	5.8	5.2	10.9	3.5	2.4	1
2024	Carlton	21	3	3	0	12	8	20	7	2	1.0	0.0	4.0	2.7	6.7	2.3	0.7	0
2025	Geelong	19	13	12	6	109	61	170	78	26	0.9	0.5	8.4	4.7	13.1	6.0	2.0	0
2026	Geelong	19	18	22	15	117	84	201	73	44	1.2	0.8	6.5	4.7	11.2	4.1	2.4	0
Career			182	167	108	1577	997	2574	851	568	0.9	0.6	8.1	5.1	13.3	4.4	3.9	11
