= Marc Pittonet =

Australian rules footballer (born 1996)

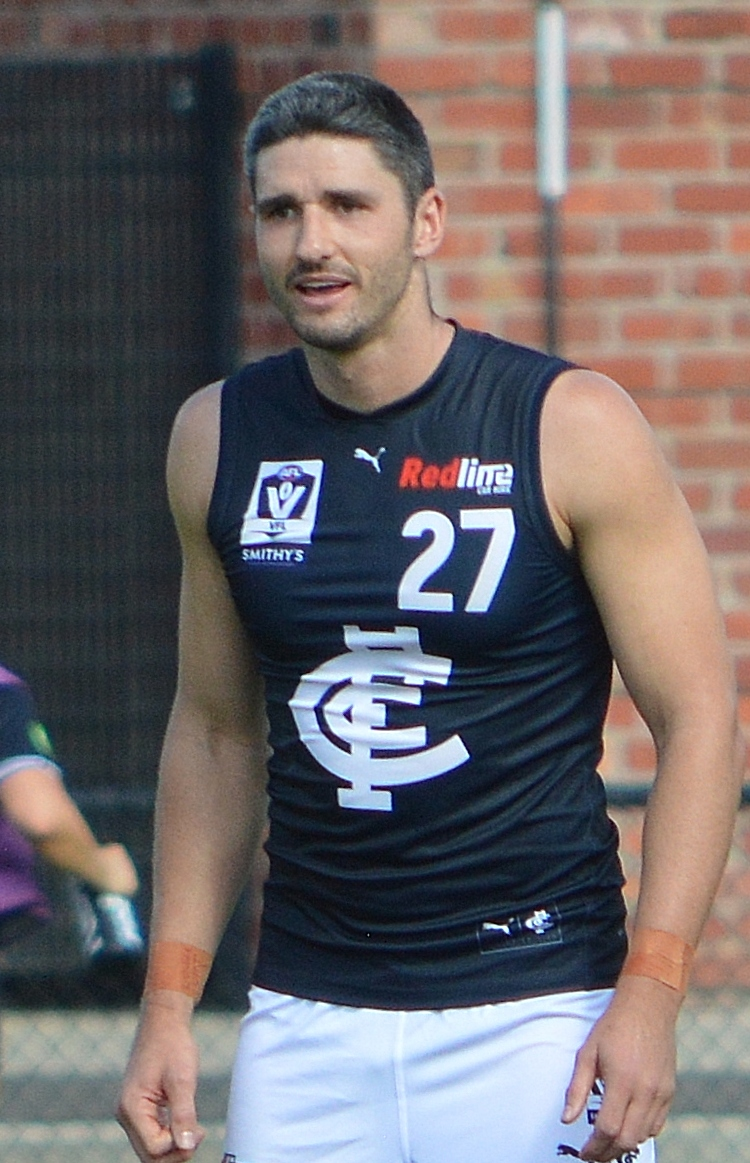
- Pittonet with Carlton's VFL side in April 2025

Personal information
- Full name: Marc Pittonet
- Nicknames: Brad, Strength
- Born: 3 June 1996 (age 30)
- Original team: Oakleigh Chargers/Xavier College
- Draft: No. 50, 2014 national draft
- Debut: Round 1, 2016, Hawthorn vs. Geelong, at Melbourne Cricket Ground
- Height: 202 cm (6 ft 8 in)
- Weight: 104 kg (229 lb)
- Position: Ruck

Club information
- Current club: Carlton
- Number: 27

Playing career^{1}
Years	Club	Games (Goals)
2015–2019	Hawthorn	7 (0)
2020–	Carlton	95 (22)
Total		102 (22)
- ^{1} Playing statistics correct to the end of the 2026 season.

Career highlights
- VFL premiership player: 2018

Marc Pittonet (born 3 June 1996) is an Australian rules footballer who plays for the Carlton Football Club in the Australian Football League (AFL). He previously played for the Hawthorn Football Club from 2015 to 2019.

== AFL career ==
Pittonet was drafted by Hawthorn Football Club with pick 50 in 2014 AFL draft from the Oakleigh Chargers in the TAC Cup, the first of only two ruckman drafted that day. A solidly built teenager when drafted, Hawthorn needed an additional ruckman after trading Luke Lowden to Adelaide. He made his AFL debut against Geelong in Round 1, 2016 as a late change, but never commanded a regular place in the senior team in five seasons with Hawthorn, managing only seven senior games over that time as a back-up ruckman to Ben McEvoy and Jonathon Ceglar. He played primarily for Box Hill, Hawthorn's VFL-affiliate, over that time, and was a dominant force in the ruck in the club's 2018 VFL grand final victory with 57 hitouts.

At the end of 2019, with two ruckmen still ahead of him at Hawthorn, Pittonet requested a trade to the Carlton Football Club in search of greater senior opportunity; he was traded along with draft pick 61 in exchange for picks 54 and 63. Pittonet was initially intended to be a back-up to veteran Matthew Kreuzer, but after Kreuzer suffered a career-ending injury in Round 1, 2020, he became the club's first choice ruckman, later forming a partnership with emerging ruckman Tom de Koning. Pittonet became well recognised as a high quality pure ruckman, and over multiple years, he recorded elite level numbers in hitouts to advantage and influence on clearances and stoppages; in contrast, a lack of mobility and weaker ball skills meant his influence around the ground and outside stoppages was below average. Pittonet signed a four-year contract extension with Carlton in 2023, securing his position at the club until 2027.

== Statistics ==
Updated to the end of the 2026 season.

Legend
G	Goals	K	Kicks	D	Disposals	T	Tackles
B	Behinds	H	Handballs	M	Marks	H/O	Hit-outs

Season	Team	No.	Games	Totals								Averages (per game)								Votes
Season	Team	No.	Games	G	B	K	H	D	M	T	H/O	G	B	K	H	D	M	T	H/O	Votes
2015	Hawthorn	43	0	—	—	—	—	—	—	—	—	—	—	—	—	—	—	—	—	0
2016	Hawthorn	43	3	0	0	3	17	20	2	10	33	0.0	0.0	1.0	5.7	6.7	0.7	3.3	11.0	0
2017	Hawthorn	43	0	—	—	—	—	—	—	—	—	—	—	—	—	—	—	—	—	0
2018	Hawthorn	27	2	0	1	3	6	9	3	7	50	0.0	0.5	1.5	3.0	4.5	1.5	3.5	25.0	0
2019	Hawthorn	27	2	0	0	3	16	19	1	7	49	0.0	0.0	1.5	8.0	9.5	0.5	3.5	24.5	0
2020 (Note: The 2020 season was played with 17 home-and-away matches per team (down from 22) and 16-minute quarters with time on (down from 20-minute quarters with time on) due to the impact of the COVID-19 pandemic.)	Carlton	27	13	0	3	59	50	109	23	24	288	0.0	0.2	4.5	3.8	8.4	1.8	1.8	22.2	0
2021	Carlton	27	13	5	5	67	80	147	26	28	379	0.4	0.4	5.2	6.2	11.3	2.0	2.2	29.2	0
2022	Carlton	27	8	0	1	26	54	80	12	13	168	0.0	0.1	3.3	6.8	10.0	1.5	1.6	21.0	0
2023	Carlton	27	18	0	1	89	82	171	24	32	446	0.0	0.1	4.9	4.6	9.5	1.3	1.8	24.8	0
2024	Carlton	27	14	5	3	96	96	192	21	21	356	0.4	0.2	6.9	6.9	13.7	1.5	1.5	25.4	0
2025	Carlton	27	7	2	0	32	52	84	12	24	168	0.3	0.0	4.6	7.4	12.0	1.7	3.4	24.0	0
2026	Carlton	27	22	10	4	130	150	280	30	64	522	0.5	0.2	5.9	6.8	12.7	1.4	2.9	23.7	1
Career			102	22	18	508	603	1111	154	230	2459	0.2	0.2	5.0	5.9	10.9	1.5	2.3	24.1	1

== Honours and achievements ==
Team

- VFL premiership player (Box Hill): 2018
- Minor premiership (Box Hill): 2015

== Personal life ==
Pittonet grew up in Melbourne’s eastern suburbs and attended Xavier College. He played junior football for Kew Comets in the Yarra Junior Football League. He is a cousin of Australian Olympian Scotty James. Growing up he supported North Melbourne. He has completed a Bachelor of Commerce from Monash University.
