= Sam Philp =

Australian football league player

Personal information
- Born: 4 August 2001 (age 25)
- Original team: Northern Knights
- Draft: No. 20, 2019 AFL draft, Carlton
- Debut: 14 June 2020, Carlton vs. Essendon, at Melbourne Cricket Ground
- Height: 185 cm (6 ft 1 in)
- Weight: 80 kg (176 lb)
- Position: Midfield

Club information
- Current club: Carlton
- Number: 34

Playing career^{1}
Years	Club	Games (Goals)
2020–2023	Carlton	2 (1)
- ^{1} Playing statistics correct to the end of the 2023 season.

Sam Philp (born 4 August 2001) is an Australian rules footballer who played for the Carlton Football Club in the Australian Football League (AFL). He was recruited by the Carlton Football Club with the 20th draft pick in the 2019 AFL draft.

== Early Football ==
Philp played junior football for St Mary's Greensborough Football Club in the Yarra Junior Football League. He then played for the Northern Knights for two seasons, winning the Brent Harvey Best and Fairest winner award at the knights. He missed out on selection for the Vic Metro representative team. When he went to the National Combine, Philp starred in the fitness testing event, with a combine-best 20m sprint time of 2.867 seconds, while also achieving top 10 scores in the yo-yo test and standing vertical jump.

== AFL career ==
Philp debuted for Carlton in Round 4 of the 2020 AFL season, where his team beat Essendon by a single point. Philp picked up 5 disposals and 2 tackles. Philp suffered persistent groin and hip injuries that rules him out for the 2021 AFL season. He was delisted by the Blues at the conclusion of the 2023 AFL Season.

== Statistics ==
Statistics are correct to the end of the 2023 season

Legend
G	Goals	K	Kicks	D	Disposals	T	Tackles
B	Behinds	H	Handballs	M	Marks

Season	Team	No.	Games	Totals							Averages (per game)						
Season	Team	No.	Games	G	B	K	H	D	M	T	G	B	K	H	D	M	T
2020	Carlton	34	2	1	1	8	6	14	1	3	0.5	0.5	4.0	3.0	7.0	0.5	1.5
Career			2	1	1	8	6	14	1	3	0.5	0.5	4.0	3.0	7.0	0.5	1.5
