= 2023 Carlton Football Club season =

Carlton Football Club
2023 season
- President: Luke Sayers
- Coach: Michael Voss
- Captain: Patrick Cripps
- Home ground: Marvel Stadium, Melbourne Cricket Ground (Training and administrative: Ikon Park)
- AFL season: 3rd (15–10–1)
- AFL Women's season: 12th (4–6)
- John Nicholls Medal: Jacob Weitering
- Leading goalkicker: Charlie Curnow (81)
- Average home attendance: 51,421
- Club membership: 95,277

The 2023 Carlton Football Club season was the Carlton Football Club's 160th season of competition.

It was the club's men's team's 127th season as a member of the Australian Football League, and the second under senior coach Michael Voss. The team recovered from a bottom four position at midseason to finish fifth in the home-and-away season with a 13–9–1 record, and ultimately finished third after reaching the preliminary finals. It was Carlton's first time qualifying for finals since 2013, ending a club-record nine-year finals drought; and its highest finishing position since 2000.

The club's women's team contested its eighth season of the AFL Women's, finishing twelfth out of eighteen teams with a 4–6 record. The club also fielded its men's reserves team in the Victorian Football League and its state level women's team in the VFL Women's.

== Club summary ==
The 2023 AFL season was the 127th season of the VFL/AFL competition since its inception in 1897; and, having competed in every season, it was also the 127th season contested by the Carlton Football Club. The club also fielded its women's team in the eighth season of the AFL Women's competition, its men's reserves team in its sixth Victorian Football League season, and its VFL women's team in its fifth VFL Women's season.

As in 2022, Carlton's primary home ground was Marvel Stadium and secondary home ground was the Melbourne Cricket Ground, with the team playing six home games at the former and five at the latter. Traditional home ground Ikon Park continued to serve as the training and administrative base, and as the home ground for AFL Women's and the men's reserves matches.

Car manufacturer Hyundai, which had been a major sponsor of the club continuously since 2008, and Great Southern Bank, which became a major sponsor during the 2021 season, continued as the club's major sponsors through the 2023 season; Carlton signed a further five-year extension of its long-term deal with Hyundai during the year. The club signed 95,277 members for the season to be the fourth-highest membership in the league, and exceeding 2022's record of 88,776 in early May; it was the sixth consecutive season that a new club record membership had been set. The club returned a net operating profit of $1.5 million, down $2 million on 2022 which was attributed to full year depreciation of the completed Ikon Park redevelopment; and launched a new philanthropic program called The First 18 in May.

== Senior personnel ==
It was a year of stability for Carlton's senior personnel: Luke Sayers continued in his second year as president, Brian Cook in his second year as CEO, Michael Voss in his second year as senior coach, and Patrick Cripps in his second year as sole club captain and fifth year overall (having served as co-captain with Sam Docherty for three years).

Departing the club's coaching panels was development and reserves coach Daniel O'Keefe, who stepped away after three years. His role as reserves coach was filled by Luke Power; Tom Lonergan joined as Development and Talent Manager, bringing experience from two Talent League clubs; and former Port Adelaide player and football committee-member Brad Ebert joined as development coach.

== Squad for 2023 ==
The following is Carlton's squad for the 2023 season.

Statistics are correct as of end of 2022 season.

Senior List
No.	Player	Age	AFL Debut	Recruited from	Career (to end 2022)		2023 Player Statistics
No.	Player	Age	AFL Debut	Recruited from	Gms	Gls	Gms	Gls	B	D	K	HB	M	T	HO
1	Jack Silvagni	25	2016	Oakleigh (U18)	99	73	16	14	12	217	129	88	64	43	47
2	Paddy Dow	23	2018	Bendigo (U18)	63	19	10	2	1	159	96	63	15	25	0
3	Jesse Motlop	19	2022	South Fremantle	12	12	21	24	7	209	123	86	38	50	0
5	Adam Cerra	23	2018	Eastern (U18), Fremantle	94	21	22	9	7	560	275	285	74	106	0
6	Zac Williams	28	2013	GWS Academy, GWS	136	32	0	–	–	–	–	–	–	–	–
7	Matthew Kennedy	25	2016	Collingullie-Glenfield Park, GWS	78	36	16	5	6	291	157	134	58	48	0
8	Lachie Fogarty	23	2018	Western (U18), Geelong	43	12	12	4	4	149	77	72	28	58	0
9	Patrick Cripps (c)	27	2014	East Fremantle	159	87	24	9	14	596	226	370	51	3
10	Harry McKay	25	2017	Gippsland (U18)	86	174	21	29	29	247	190	57	141	34	18
11	Mitch McGovern	28	2016	Claremont, Adelaide	88	104	22	2	2	379	297	82	105	54	0
12	Tom de Koning	23	2018	Dandenong (U18)	41	12	19	9	7	228	114	114	54	47	337
13	Blake Acres	27	2014	West Perth, St Kilda, Fremantle	120	37	25	10	5	576	319	257	137	62	0
14	Oliver Hollands	18	2023	Murray (U18)	–	–	19	2	4	266	163	103	58	48	0
15	Sam Docherty	29	2013	Gippsland (U18), Brisbane Lions	144	17	23	8	9	586	359	227	138	90	0
16	Jack Carroll	20	2022	East Fremantle	5	1	1	0	0	4	1	3	0	1	0
17	Brodie Kemp	21	2021	Bendigo (U18)	6	0	17	1	0	269	182	87	113	28	0
18	Sam Walsh (vc)	22	2019	Geelong (U18)	81	31	18	6	4	514	222	292	63	44	0
19	Corey Durdin	20	2021	Central District	23	16	11	11	7	97	66	31	16	44	0
20	Lachie Plowman	28	2013	Calder (U18), GWS	144	2	1	0	0	12	9	3	5	2	0
21	Jack Martin	27	2014	Claremont, Gold Coast	135	113	13	17	10	142	75	67	46	31	0
22	Caleb Marchbank	26	2015	Murray (U18), GWS	52	0	8	0	0	111	77	37	46	16	0
23	Jacob Weitering (vc)	25	2016	Dandenong (U18)	133	11	26	0	0	402	317	85	208	23	0
24	Nic Newman	29	2017	Frankston, Sydney	86	14	24	3	3	561	376	185	183	85	0
25	Zac Fisher	24	2017	Perth	95	49	12	4	5	250	135	115	40	16	0
26	Lachie Cowan	18	—	Devonport, Tasmania (U18)	–	–	7	0	0	69	49	20	20	13	0
27	Marc Pittonet	26	2016	Oakleigh (U18), Hawthorn	41	5	18	0	1	171	89	82	24	32	446
28	David Cuningham	25	2016	Oakleigh (U18)	41	23	12	6	4	166	64	102	26	102	0
29	George Hewett	27	2016	North Adelaide, Sydney	135	36	22	3	1	445	182	263	49	102	0
30	Charlie Curnow	25	2016	Geelong (U18)	84	143	26	81	44	356	280	76	180	27	3
31	Harry Lemmey	18	—	West Adelaide	–	–	0	–	–	–	–	–	–	–	–
32	Jaxon Binns	18	—	Dandenong (U18)	–	–	0	–	–	–	–	–	–	–	–
33	Lewis Young	24	2017	Sturt, Western Bulldogs	43	2	15	0	2	200	114	86	77	16	60
34	Sam Philp	21	2020	Northern (U18)	2	1	0	–	–	–	–	–	–	–	–
36	Josh Honey	21	2020	Western (U18)	11	7	6	3	3	44	27	17	14	13	0
42	Adam Saad	28	2015	Calder (U18), Coburg, Gold Coast, Essendon	152	10	25	0	0	502	341	161	111	48	0
44	Matthew Owies	25	2020	St Kevin's, Seattle Redhawks	31	29	18	27	12	161	107	54	48	44	0
Rookie List
No.	Player	Age	AFL Debut	Recruited from	Career (to end 2022)		2023 Player Statistics
No.	Player	Age	AFL Debut	Recruited from	Gms	Gls	Gms	Gls	B	D	K	HB	M	T	HO
4	Lochie O'Brien	23	2018	Bendigo (U18)	60	16	6	0	1	43	30	13	17	5	0
35	Ed Curnow	33	2011	Geelong (U18), Adelaide, Box Hill	204	50	17	3	6	225	141	84	46	43	0
37	Jordan Boyd	24	2022	Western (U18), Footscray reserves	7	0	9	0	2	112	83	29	26	21	0
38	Sam Durdin	26	2017	West Adelaide, North Melbourne, Glenelg	23	1	0	–	–	–	–	–	–	–	–
39	Alex Cincotta	26	2023	Newtown & Chilwell, Carlton reserves	–	–	19	3	2	234	113	121	53	35	0
40	Hudson O'Keeffe	18	–	Oakleigh (U18)	–	–	0	–	–	–	–	–	–	–	–
41	Domanic Akuei	20	–	Carlton academy	–	–	0	–	–	–	–	–	–	–	–
45	Alex Mirkov	23	–	Carlton reserves	–	–	0	–	–	–	–	–	–	–	–
46	Matthew Cottrell	22	2020	Dandenong (U18)	37	14	17	11	11	238	160	78	72	34	0
Senior coaching panel
	Coach	Coaching position				Carlton Coaching debut		Former clubs as coach
	Michael Voss	Senior coach				2022		Brisbane Lions (s), Port Adelaide (a)
	Luke Power	Head of development, reserves coach				2020		GWS (a), AFL Academy Manager
	Tim Clarke	Assistant coach (Midfield)				2016		Richmond (a), Coburg (s), Richmond reserves (s), Gold Coast (a)
	Aaron Hamill	Assistant coach (backline)				2022		St Kilda (a), Sandringham (s)
	Ashley Hansen	Assistant coach (forwards)				2022		Western Bulldogs (a), Footscray reserves (s)
	Matthew Kreuzer	Assistant coach (ruck)				2022
	Tom Lonergan	Development and talent manager				2023		Calder Cannons (d), Geelong Falcons (d)
	Brad Ebert	Development coach				2023		Port Adelaide (m)
	Torin Baker	Carlton College of Sport and Academy and development coach				2021		Western Jets (s), Hawthorn (d)
	Aaron Greaves	Coaching and performance manager				2022		Melbourne (d, a), Port Adelaide (a, d), North Melbourne (d), AFL umpires (s)

- For players: (c) denotes captain, (vc) denotes vice-captain.
- For coaches: (s) denotes senior coach, (cs) denotes caretaker senior coach, (a) denotes assistant coach, (d) denotes development coach, (m) denotes managerial or administrative role in a football or coaching department

== Playing list changes ==
The following summarises all player changes which occurred after the 2022 season. Unless otherwise noted, draft picks refer to selections in the 2022 National Draft.

=== In ===
Player	Former Club	League	via
Blake Acres	Fremantle	AFL	Trade period, in exchange for a third-round selection in the 2023 National Draft.
Oliver Hollands	Murray Bushrangers	NAB League	2022 National Draft, first round selection (No. 11 overall).
Lachie Cowan	Tasmania Devils	NAB League	2022 National Draft, second round selection (No. 30 overall).
Jaxon Binns	Dandenong Stingrays	NAB League	2022 National Draft, second round selection (No. 32 overall).
Harry Lemmey	West Adelaide	SANFL	2022 National Draft, third round selection (No. 47 overall).
Hudson O'Keeffe	Oakleigh Chargers	NAB League	2023 pre-season supplemental selection period.
Alex Cincotta	Carlton reserves	VFL	2023 pre-season supplemental selection period.

=== Out ===
Player	New Club	League	via
Jack Newnes	Greensborough	Northern FL	Delisted after the season
Liam Stocker	St Kilda	AFL	Delisted after the season, then recruited by St Kilda in the 2023 pre-season supplemental selection period.
Oscar McDonald	Williamstown	VFL	Delisted from the rookie list after the season
Luke Parks	Carlton reserves	VFL	Delisted from the rookie list after the season
Will Hayes	Euroa	Goulburn Valley FL	Delisted from the rookie list after the season
Will Setterfield	Essendon	Australian Football League	Trade period, along with a fourth-round selection (provisionally No. 68), in exchange for a fourth-round selection in the 2023 National Draft

=== List management ===
Player	Change
Liam Jones	Signed with Western Bulldogs as an unrestricted free agent; Carlton received a third-round selection as compensation (provisionally No. 49). Jones had retired from Carlton prior to the 2022 season due to the league's COVID-19 vaccine mandate, which was later removed; but Carlton remained entitled to a compensatory draft pick because of the short duration over which Jones had been retired.
Matthew Owies	Elevated from the Category B rookie list to the senior list.
Ed Curnow	Demoted from the senior list to the rookie list. Administratively, Curnow was selected in the 2023 rookie draft with Carlton's first round selection (No. 10 overall).

== Season summary ==
=== Pre-season ===
Carlton played two practice matches, the first deemed unofficial and the second deemed official, as part of its lead-up to the premiership season.

**Date and local time**	**Opponent**	**Scores** (Carlton's scores indicated in **bold**)			**Venue**	**Attendance**
**Date and local time**	**Opponent**	Home	Away	Result	**Venue**	**Attendance**
Friday, 24 February (11:00 am)	Collingwood	**12.12 (84)**	11.8 (74)	Won by 10 points	Ikon Park (H)	6,000
Friday, 3 March (7:10 pm)	Sydney	15.7 (97)	**7.12 (54)**	Lost by 43 points	Blacktown ISP (A)	6,000

=== Home-and-away season ===
Following Carlton's improvement and narrow finals miss in 2022, expectations were high among experts that Carlton would make finals; and the season opened well with the club sitting in second place after an unbeaten first month.

Thereafter followed a sudden drop in form, and Carlton lost eight of its next nine matches – defeating only wooden spooners West Coast – to drop to the bottom four with a 4–8–1 record. While Carlton maintained strong performance in contested ball during this period and frequently won the territory and inside-50 counts, its matches were characterised by low pressure without the ball, and a forward structure which struggled to convert territory into goals – averaging below eight goals in those losses and including separate 28 and 34 point losses in matches with more scoring shots than the opponent.

As the losing streak progressed, there was unrest among the club's powerbrokers and directors: on 13 May, long-time powerbroker Bruce Mathieson gave a newspaper interview critical of the club's off-field leadership; and in the dressing room after the loss against Sydney, director Craig Mathieson was compelled to resign after a verbal altercation with president Luke Sayers – a reaction which was seen as a strong statement by Sayers against the club's other administrative factions in support of Michael Voss as coach. In the week prior to the final loss of the streak against Essendon, the playing group organised a campfire retreat at Ed Curnow's Torquay home, which served as an honesty and bonding session, which was considered a key catalyst for the club's onfield recovery in the latter half of the year.

The club's form improved significantly, and a nine-game winning streak followed – including wins against top four opponents Port Adelaide, Collingwood and Melbourne over a five-week period – characterised by record level stoppage differentials, improved efficiency of scoring from turnover, and a complete reversal of its difficulties converting territory to scores. The club secured its finals berth in round 23 Gold Coast with its ninth consecutive win – recovering from a 40-point second quarter deficit to win by four points – before losing a round 24 match against Greater Western Sydney which by the time it was played had no impact on Carlton's fifth-placed finish.

Across the home-and-away season, Carlton was 3–3 in six games against the top four (who won sixteen or more games), 2–6 against the clubs who finished 6th to 11th (eleven to thirteen wins), and unbeaten with 8–0–1 against the bottom seven. The club's late season recovery was one of the most remarkable on record: only the 1945 Blues, 1959 Bombers and 2023 Giants (who also achieved the feat this year) had ever reached a preliminary final after sitting in the bottom four of a twelve-or-more team competition at or beyond midseason.

**Rd**	**Date and local time**	**Opponent**	**Scores** (Carlton's scores indicated in **bold**)			**Venue**	**Attendance**	**Ladder**
**Rd**	**Date and local time**	**Opponent**	Home	Away	Result	**Venue**	**Attendance**	**Ladder**
1	Thursday, 16 March (7:20 am)	Richmond	8.10 (58)	**8.10 (58)**	Match drawn	Melbourne Cricket Ground (A)	88,084	9th
2	Thursday, 23 March (7:20 pm)	Geelong	**13.12 (90)**	12.10 (82)	Won by 8 points	Melbourne Cricket Ground (H)	55,861	7th
3	Saturday, 1 April (4:35 pm)	GWS	9.10 (64)	**9.20 (74)**	Won by 10 points	GIANTS Stadium (A)	9,691	3rd
4	Friday, 7 April (4:20 pm)	North Melbourne	11.18 (84)	**16.11 (107)**	Won by 23 points	Marvel Stadium (A)	49,062	2nd
5	Thursday, 13 April (7:10 pm)	Adelaide	18.10 (118)	**9.8 (62)**	Lost by 56 points	Adelaide Oval (N)	47,395	4th
6	Sunday, 23 April (3:20 pm)	St Kilda	**8.12 (60)**	12.10 (82)	Lost by 22 points	Marvel Stadium (H)	45,770	8th
7	Saturday, 29 April (5:30 pm)	West Coast	6.8 (44)	**23.14 (152)**	Won by 108 points	Optus Stadium (A)	47,490	6th
8	Friday, 5 May (7:50 pm)	Brisbane Lions	**11.8 (74)**	15.10 (100)	Lost by 26 points	Marvel Stadium (H)	45,458	8th
9	Saturday, 13 May (7:30 pm)	Western Bulldogs	**8.11 (59)**	11.13 (79)	Lost by 20 points	Marvel Stadium (H)	42,756	9th
10	Sunday, 21 May (3:20 pm)	Collingwood	**7.15 (57)**	13.7 (85)	Lost by 28 points	Melbourne Cricket Ground (H)	80,354	11th
11	Friday, 26 May (7:50 pm)	Sydney	11.11 (77)	**6.15 (51)**	Lost by 26 points	Sydney Cricket Ground (A)	36,310	13th
12	Friday, 2 June (7:50 pm)	Melbourne	8.13 (61)	**6.8 (44)**	Lost by 17 points	Melbourne Cricket Ground (A)	49,872	14th
13	Sunday, 11 June (7:15 pm)	Essendon	**6.16 (52)**	13.8 (86)	Lost by 34 points	Melbourne Cricket Ground (H)	83,638	15th
14	Sunday, 18 June (1:10 pm)	Gold Coast	**18.12 (120)**	8.13 (61)	Won by 59 points	Melbourne Cricket Ground (H)	29,602	14th
15	Bye							15th
16	Sunday, 2 July (1:10 pm)	Hawthorn	7.10 (52)	**17.10 (112)**	Won by 60 points	Melbourne Cricket Ground (A)	66,337	14th
17	Sunday, 9 July (2:20 pm)	Fremantle	6.9 (45)	**14.14 (98)**	Won by 53 points	Optus Stadium (A)	49,469	11th
18	Saturday, 15 July (4:35 pm)	Port Adelaide	**18.14 (122)**	10.12 (72)	Won by 50 points	Marvel Stadium (H)	34,306	10th
19	Saturday, 22 July (2:10 pm)	West Coast	**21.14 (140)**	10.9 (69)	Won by 71 points	Marvel Stadium (H)	34,954	9th
20	Friday, 28 July (7:50 pm)	Collingwood	10.16 (76)	**14.9 (93)**	Won by 17 points	Melbourne Cricket Ground (A)	86,785	7th
21	Sunday, 6 August (3:20 pm)	St Kilda	8.6 (54)	**10.13 (73)**	Won by 19 points	Marvel Stadium (A)	42,656	5th
22	Saturday, 12 August (7:20 pm)	Melbourne	**9.6 (60)**	8.8 (56)	Won by 4 points	Melbourne Cricket Ground (H)	68,577	5th
23	Saturday, 19 August (2:10 pm)	Gold Coast	13.9 (87)	**13.13 (91)**	Won by 4 points	Heritage Bank Stadium (A)	19,253	5th
24	Sunday, 27 August (6:10 pm)	GWS	**11.7 (73)**	16.9 (105)	Lost by 32 points	Marvel Stadium (H)	44,354	5th

=== Finals ===
In the elimination final, Carlton faced Sydney. A strong second quarter saw Carlton build a 29-point lead at half time, before Sydney gradually fought back throughout the second half; Sydney's last goal with thirty seconds left to play drew the margin back to six points, the closest it had been since the first quarter, but Carlton held on for a six-point victory. In a close semi-final against Melbourne, played with high pressure and high errors, Carlton conceded the first three goals then scored the next five, before neither team managed more than two consecutive goals for the rest of the game; Carlton trailed by nine points entering time on in the final quarter, before kicking the last two goals to defeat an inaccurate Melbourne by two points. 2023 recruit Blake Acres kicked Carlton's last goal late in the final quarters of both games: a steadying goal which put Carlton 14 points ahead in the 23rd minute against Sydney; and the go-ahead goal with less than a minute remaining against Melbourne. In the preliminary final against Brisbane, Carlton opened strongly with the first five goals to lead by 30 points after 22 minutes; Brisbane then took control of the game, and kicked ten of the next eleven goals between the late first quarter and the early final quarter to lead by as much as 28 points; two quick goals by Carlton brought the margin back to 16 points with eight minutes remaining, but Carlton got no closer and 16 points was the final margin.

**Week**	**Date and local time**	**Opponent**	**Scores** (Carlton's scores indicated in **bold**)			**Venue**	**Attendance**
**Week**	**Date and local time**	**Opponent**	Home	Away	Result	**Venue**	**Attendance**
First elimination final	Friday, 8 September (7:50 pm)	Sydney	**11.8 (74)**	9.14 (68)	Won by 6 points	Melbourne Cricket Ground (H)	92,026
First semi-final	Friday, 15 September (7:50 pm)	Melbourne	9.17 (71)	**11.7 (73)**	Won by 2 points	Melbourne Cricket Ground (A)	96,412
Second preliminary final	Saturday, 23 September (5:15 pm)	Brisbane Lions	11.13 (79)	**9.9 (63)**	Lost by 16 points	The Gabba (A)	36,012

== Team records ==
- Round 7 – the 108-point victory against West Coast was the club's greatest winning margin since round 2, 2011.
- Round 13 – Carlton lost by 34 points against Essendon, equalling the club record for heaviest defeat when recording more scoring shots than the opponent.
- Rounds 14–19 – Carlton won five consecutive matches by fifty or more points, joining the 1989 Cats and 2008 Cats as only the third team ever to achieve the feat.
- Rounds 14–23 – Carlton won nine consecutive matches, its longest winning streak – and, first winning streak longer than four games – since 2000.
- Round 19 – Carlton scored 9.5 (59) in the first quarter, and 15.8 (98) in the first half, against West Coast. It was the club's highest quarter time score since round 2, 2011, and highest half time score since round 16, 2000. Its half time lead of 82 points was its highest since round 19, 1982.
- Round 23 – Carlton defeated Gold Coast after trailing by 33 points at quarter time, the club's largest quarter time deficit successfully overcome since round 3, 2007.

== Individual awards ==
=== John Nicholls Medal ===
The Carlton Football Club Best and Fairest awards night took place on 8 October 2023.

John Nicholls Medal

The winner of the John Nicholls Medal was Jacob Weitering, who polled 210 votes to win the award for the second time in his career. Nic Newman finished second with 193 votes for the best finish of his career to date, and Charlie Curnow was third with 174 votes.

Pos.	Player	Votes
1st	Jacob Weitering	210
2nd	Nic Newman	193
3rd	Charlie Curnow	174
4th	Adam Cerra	167
5th	Patrick Cripps	158
6th	Blake Acres	153
7th	Sam Docherty	152
8th	Adam Saad	149
9th	Sam Walsh	143
10th	Mitch McGovern	108

Other awards

The following other awards were presented on John Nicholls Medal night:-

- Best Young Player – Oliver Hollands
- Best Clubman – Nic Newman
- Best Finals Player – Sam Walsh
- Spirit of Carlton Award – Blake Acres
- Bill Lanyon Inner Blue Ruthless Award – Sam Walsh
- Carltonians William A. Cook Award – Charlie Curnow
- Coaches' Award – Blake Acres
- Players' Award – Charlie Curnow

=== Leading goalkickers ===
Charlie Curnow won the Coleman Medal as the league's leading goalkicker in the home-and-away season for the second time in his career. Curnow kicked 78 goals in the home-and-away season, winning the award by a margin of two goals from Taylor Walker (Adelaide) after kicking three goals in the round 24 match against Greater Western Sydney, and finished with 81 goals. Curnow became the first Carlton player ever to win consecutive VFL/AFL leading goalkicker awards; and it was Carlton's third consecutive Coleman Medal as a club, Harry McKay having won the medal in 2021.

Player	Goals	Behinds
Charlie Curnow	81	44
Harry McKay	29	29
Matthew Owies	27	12
Jesse Motlop	24	7
Jack Martin	17	10

=== Other awards ===
Honorific teams

- All-Australian team — one Carlton player was named in the 2023 All-Australian team: Charlie Curnow at full-forward, the second time he had earned selection. Patrick Cripps and Jacob Weitering were also named in the extended 44-man squad.
- 22under22 team of the decade — three Carlton players (Patrick Cripps, Charlie Curnow and Sam Docherty) were named in the 22under22 team of the decade. The honorific team was announced in March 2023, and it represented the ten 22under22 teams between 2013 and 2022.

AFLCA awards

- Assistant coach Tim Clarke won the AFLCA Phil Walsh Memorial Scholarship.
- Sam Walsh won the Gary Ayres Award as the best player in the 2023 AFL finals series. He was the first player who did not play in the grand final to win the award since its inception in 2015.

Other awards

- Sam Docherty won the Jim Stynes Community Leadership Award for his work as an observer to the board of the Peter MacCallum Cancer Foundation and as an ambassador to the MacKillop Family Services’ Paws4Kids.

Statistical leaders

- Jacob Weitering took 208 marks, the most of any player in the league.
- Charlie Curnow took 67 contested marks and 73 marks inside forward 50, the most of any player in the league.

Records

- Round 19 – Charlie Curnow kicked 10.3 against West Coast, the highest tally in his career and the first time a Carlton player had kicked ten goals in a game since Stephen Kernahan in 1995.
- Round 19 - Charlie Curnow took eight contested marks, breaking the club game record for most contested marks. (Recorded since 1999).
- Season – Jacob Weitering took 208 marks, tying the club season record held by Lance Whitnall in 2000. (Recorded since 1965)
- Season – Charlie Curnow took 67 contested marks, breaking the club season record held by Lance Whitnall in 1999. (Recorded since 1999).

Hall of Fame

- Chris Judd, who played for Carlton from 2008 to 2015, was inducted into the Carlton Football Club Hall of Fame.

== AFL Women's ==
After failing to play finals in both 2022 AFLW seasons, the club conducted an independent review of its AFLW program, which ran between December 2022 and January 2023. Among the review's conclusions was the need for a full-time senior coach to improve leadership across the program, and a recognition that there had been confusion among the players regarding the club's onfield game plan – two conclusions which resulted in the club terminating part-time senior coach Daniel Harford, who had coached the team for five seasons. The review also identified a need for an increased professional and high-performance culture, and improved 360° feedback and development.

Harford was replaced as senior coach by Mathew Buck, who had been a senior assistant coach with the club's men's reserves team. The extended coaching panel was also replaced in full: Carlton College of Sport coordinator Ash Naulty stepped up as Head of AFLW; Tom Couch joined as head of development and midfield assistant coach; Glenn Strachan joined as senior and backline assistant coach; Christina Polatajko joined as forwardline assistant coach; and Lachlan Swaney was appointed development coach.

Squad

The club's AFL Women's 2023 squad is given below. Experienced players lost from the squad were: Elise O'Dea (28 games for Carlton after 28 for Melbourne), who retired; Lucy McEvoy (33 games), who signed with Sydney; Brooke Walker (26 games), who was traded to Essendon; and Natalie Plane (21 games), who was traded to St Kilda in a three-way trade including Richmond; Inaugural Melbourne player Harriet Cordner joined the club from Richmond in the Plane trade.

Carlton was active in the 2023 AFL Women's draft – which was a special over-19s only draft due to the shortened time between the two 2022 AFL Women's seasons – adding Lulu Beatty (pick No. 5) and Madeline Hendrie (pick No. 9) in the first round, Marianna Anthony (pick No. 20) in the second round, and Chloe Wrigley (pick No. 28) in the third round. Carlton also added gaelic footballers Dayna Finn and Erone Fitzpatrick to the list.

The club's 2023 squad is given below. Numbers in parentheses represent games played and goals scored for the season.

Carlton Football Club (2023)
Senior list		Coaching staff
1 Amelia Velardo (10,0); 2 Jessica Dal Pos (vc) (7,1); 3 Darcy Vescio (lg) (10,7); 4 Keeley Skepper (9,3); 5 Abbie McKay (lg) (10,3); 6 Gab Pound (9,0); 7 Tahlia Read (0,0); 8 Vaomua Laloifi (10,0); 9 Kerryn Peterson (c) (4,0); 10 Mimi Hill (vc) (10,1); 11 Annie Lee (2,0); 12 Jess Good (9,1); 13 Lulu Beatty (0,0); 14 Marianna Anthony (6,1); 15 Chloe Wrigley (0,0); 16 Breann Moody (lg) (10,6); 17 Dayna Finn (5,0)	18 Maddy Guerin (0,0); 19 Erone Fitzpatrick (10,6); 20 Lily Goss (10,3); 21 Harriet Cordner (10,3); 22 Mia Austin (10,11); 23 Daisy Walker (5,1); 24 Brooke Vickers (9,0); 25 Keeley Sherar (10,1); 26 Paige Trudgeon (2,0); 27 Genevieve Lawson-Tavan (8,0); 28 Imogen Milford (3,1); 34 Taylor Ortlepp (4,0); 36 Ciara Fitzgerald (6,0); 37 Phoebe McWilliams (6,3); 49 Madeline Hendrie (6,0)	**Head coach**: Mathew Buck; **Assistant coaches**: Tom Couch (midfield); Christina Polatajko (forwards); Glenn Strachan (backline); Lachlan Swaney (development); Ash Naulty (head of AFLW); Legend: (c) Captain(s); (vc) Vice-captain(s); Updated: Source(s): Senior list, Coaching staff

Season

Carlton finished twelfth out of eighteen teams, with a 4–6 record, to miss the finals. Carlton's had been in sixth place with a 4–2 record after six rounds, but lost its last four matches despite only one of those matches coming against a finalist. Overall, Carlton was 2–2 in four matches against finalists, and 2–4 in six matches against non-finalists.

**Rd**	**Date and local time**	**Opponent**	**Scores** (Carlton's scores indicated in **bold**)			**Venue**	**Attendance**	**Ladder**
**Rd**	**Date and local time**	**Opponent**	Home	Away	Result	**Venue**	**Attendance**	**Ladder**
1	Saturday, 2 September (1:05 pm)	Gold Coast	**5.4 (34)**	4.8 (32)	Won by 2 points	Ikon Park (H)	3,244	9th
2	Sunday, 10 September (3:05 pm)	Kangaroos	10.6 (66)	**1.0 (6)**	Lost by 60 points	Arden Street Oval (A)	2,788	13th
3	Sunday, 17 September (1:05 pm)	West Coast	3.6 (24)	**12.5 (77)**	Won by 53 points	Mineral Resources Park (A)	1,208	9th
4	Saturday, 23 September (3:05 pm)	Richmond	**6.4 (40)**	7.5 (47)	Lost by 7 points	Ikon Park (H)	2,304	9th
5	Friday, 29 September (4:05 pm)	Sydney	**6.8 (44)**	6.3 (39)	Won by 5 points	Ikon Park (H)	2,304	8th
6	Friday, 6 October (7:15 pm)	Western Bulldogs	4.10 (34)	**8.5 (53)**	Won by 19 points	VU Whitten Oval (A)	2,163	6th
7	Sunday, 15 October (3:05 pm)	Collingwood	**1.4 (10)**	4.3 (27)	Lost by 17 points	Ikon Park (H)	3,111	9th
8	Saturday, 21 October (3:05 pm)	Greater Western Sydney	8.1 (49)	**7.5 (47)**	Lost by 2 points	Henson Park (A)	1,574	9th
9	Saturday, 28 October (3:05 pm)	Essendon	8.8 (56)	**3.6 (24)**	Lost by 32 points	Windy Hill (A)	3,812	11th
10	Sunday, 5 November (1:05 pm)	St Kilda	3.8 (26)	**7.4 (46)**	Lost by 20 points	Ikon Park (H)	2,649	12th

League awards

- No Carlton players were selected in the 2023 AFL Women's All-Australian team. Only one player – Keeley Sheerar – was selected in the initial 42-woman squad.

== Reserves ==
Carlton fielded reserves teams in the men's and women's competitions during the 2023 season.

=== Men's ===
Carlton's men's reserves team contested its sixth VFL season; and its 86th overall season of reserves and state level competition dating back to 1919.

Club Head of Development Luke Power took over as the reserves coach after 2021–22 coach Daniel O'Keefe departed. VFL-listed players newly signed to the team included: former AFL senior players Luke Parks (Carlton), Liam McMahon (Collingwood) and Ben Ronke (Sydney); and Sam Grant, Blake Kuipers, Ethan Bentley, Jed Brereton, Charlie Brauer, Noah Barnes, Nathan Scollo, Ben Moyle, Will White, Jack Maruff, Jack Lefroy and Eli Pearce. Retained from the 2022 squad were Ben Crocker, Zavier Maher, Heath Ramshaw, Michael Lewis, Mitch Moschetti, Tyreece Lieu, Patrick Dozzi, Ned Cahill, Hayden Gill, Archie Stevens, Logan Prout, Aiden Mills, Darcy Porter, Hamish Sinnott, Lachlan Swaney. 2023 No. 1 draft pick Harley Reid also notably played two games as the underage 23rd man, zoned to Carlton from the Bendigo Pioneers, early in the year. Ben Crocker, in his third season with the team, took over as captain following the departure of Matt Shannon.

The reserves team finished 11th out of 21 clubs with a win-loss record of 10–8 and a percentage of 106.5%. The team narrowly missed the wildcard round, which was played by the teams ranked 7th through 10th, on percentage from the North Melbourne reserves whose percentage was 109.9%. Entering the final round, Carlton had been well placed to qualify even with a loss, but dropped to 11th place after losing more than 12%pts in a disastrous 127-point loss against eventual premiers Gold Coast. First year senior listed player Jaxon Binns, who did not play a senior game through the year, won the reserves best and fairest.

=== Women's ===
The club fielded a team in the VFL Women's competition for the fifth time. Tom Stafford continued as the team's coach for the second season, and Christina Bernardi took over as captain.

The team finished 6th out of 12 in the home-and-away season with an 8–6 record and a league-high percentage of 150.7%, to finish in the last position in the final six; it was a close season overall, with minor premiers Collingwood finishing only one game ahead on 9–5 with a lower percentage. It was the first time Carlton had qualified for the VFL Women's finals, which were played under the Second McIntyre Final Six System.

In the elimination final against third-placed Williamstown, Carlton recovered from a 0.0 (0) vs 1.5 (11) first quarter to win a wet weather game by four points. Then in a close first semi-final against second-placed Port Melbourne, Carlton lost by one point, to finish the season in fourth place.

Finals matches

**Week**	**Date and local time**	**Opponent**	**Scores** (Carlton's scores indicated in **bold**)			**Venue**
**Week**	**Date and local time**	**Opponent**	Home	Away	Result	**Venue**
Elimination Final	Sunday, 9 July (4:30 pm)	Williamstown	2.6 (18)	**3.4 (22)**	Won by 4 points	DSV Stadium (A)
First Semi-final	Sunday, 16 July (12:00 pm)	Port Melbourne	5.7 (37)	**5.6 (36)**	Lost by 1 point	ETU Stadium (A)
