= 2022 Carlton Football Club season =

Carlton Football Club
2022 season
- President: Luke Sayers
- Coach: Michael Voss
- Captain: Patrick Cripps
- Home grounds: Marvel Stadium, Melbourne Cricket Ground (Training and administrative: Ikon Park)
- AFL season: 9th (12–10)
- AFL Women's (S6): 8th (4–6)
- AFL Women's (S7): 14th (2–6–2)
- John Nicholls Medal: Patrick Cripps
- Leading goalkicker: Charlie Curnow (64)
- Club membership: 88,776

The 2022 Carlton Football Club season was the Carlton Football Club's 159th season of competition.

It was the club's men's team's 126th season as a member of the Australian Football League, and the first under new senior coach Michael Voss. The club finished ninth with a 12–10 record, just barely missing the finals on percentage by 0.6%pts – its best performance since 2013, but also a disappointing finish after having been positioned third with an 8–2 record halfway through the season. Carlton players won both of the league's major individual awards for the season: Patrick Cripps winning the Brownlow Medal as fairest and best, and Charlie Curnow winning the Coleman Medal as leading goalkicker with 64 goals.

Due to a change to the AFL Women's timing in the calendar year, the club's women's team contested two distinct seasons as part of the 2022 campaign. In season 6, held between January and April, the team finished eighth out of fourteen teams with a record of 4–6; and in season 7, held between August and November, the team finished fourteenth out of eighteen teams with a record of 2–6–2 – thereby missing the finals in both seasons.

The club also fielded its men's reserves team in the Victorian Football League and its state level women's team in the VFL Women's.

== Club summary ==
The 2022 AFL season will be the 126th season of the VFL/AFL competition since its inception in 1897; and, having competed in every season, it will also be the 126th season contested by the Carlton Football Club. The club will also field its women's team in the sixth and seventh seasons of the AFL Women's competition, its men's reserves team in its fifth Victorian Football League season, and its women's reserves team in its fourth VFL Women's season.

In a change from the previous seven seasons, Carlton's primary home ground was Marvel Stadium and secondary home ground was the Melbourne Cricket Ground, with the team playing six home games at the former and five at the latter. Traditional home ground Ikon Park continued to serve as the training and administrative base, and as the home ground for AFL Women's and the men's reserves matches; the stadium reached a milestone in its redevelopment during the year, with the completion of extended administration, training and match-day pavilion facilities along the southern wing where the Richard Pratt Stand (demolished in 2021) had previously stood.

Car manufacturer Hyundai, which had been a major sponsor of the club continuously since 2008, and Great Southern Bank which became a major sponsor during the 2021 season, continued as the club's major sponsors through the 2022 season. The club's final membership tally for the season was a new club record of 88,776, making it the fifth consecutive season that a new club record membership had been set. The club's average home crowd of 49,784 was the highest in the league, and the club returned a net operating profit was $3.4 million, up $2 million on 2021.

== Senior personnel ==
Early in the 2021 season, a change in the presidency was announced, with club director and former PriceWaterhouseCoopers CEO Luke Sayers taking over from eight-year president Mark Lo Giudice immediately after the end of the 2021 season. As part of the transition, and in response to the club's weaker than expected start to the 2021 season, a comprehensive review of the club's football department was undertaken in the second half of 2021, which was conducted by Sayers, CEO Cain Liddle, and external panel members Matthew Pavlich, Geoff Walsh and Graham Lowe. Following the report, a wide range of senior personnel changes were made at the club. Sayers officially became president on August 17, 2021, one round before the 2021 season's end.

Chief among the changes was the sacking of senior coach David Teague, after two seasons of his initial three year contract. Although his 21–29 win–loss record bettered those of his two predecessors (Mick Malthouse's 19–32–1 and Brendon Bolton's 16–61), interviews conducted during the review found Teague's coaching methods and gameplan were supported by only 30% of the club's players and staff, with that support heavily slanted towards the younger players. The review found that the gameplan focussed too heavily on attack at the expense of defense, was confusing for the players to execute, and that he was frequently outcoached by opposing coaches.

Teague was replaced with Michael Voss, who was signed to a three-year contract. Voss had previously served as senior coach at Brisbane Lions (2009–2013) and assistant coach at Port Adelaide (2014–2021), and had been a front-runner for the vacant Carlton senior coaching role in both 2008 and 2019, when Brett Ratten and Teague were appointed respectively. The club made well publicised overtures to long-time senior coaches Alastair Clarkson (Hawthorn 2005–2021) and Ross Lyon (St Kilda 2007–2011 and Fremantle 2012–2019) as part of its search, with both declining the role.

The review also identified deficiencies in the leadership, experience and development capabilities of the coaching staff. The assistant and development coaching panels underwent substantial changes, with ten-year assistant coach John Barker departing early in the review process, six-year assistant Dale Amos and four-year development coach Brent Stanton sacked at the end of the season, four-year assistant Cameron Bruce departing for a role at Brisbane Lions. Joining the panel were: St Kilda assistant coach and former Carlton player of the 1990s Aaron Hamill as backline assistant coach; Tim Clarke, for his second stint as Carlton's midfield assistant coach after three seasons at Gold Coast; Western Bulldogs assistant coach Ashley Hansen, who served as forwards assistant coach and as step-up game day senior coach in Round 2 when Voss was absent under Covid-19 protocols; and Matthew Kreuzer as ruck coach. Aaron Greaves also joined to support the panel as coaching and innovation manager.

There were also several changes at the club's administrative level. Liddle was sacked after four years as CEO in the role, and replaced with Brian Cook, who had served 32 seasons in CEO roles with West Coast (1990–1998) and Geelong (1999–2021), overseeing five premierships at those clubs. Four new additions were made to the club's board of directors: former player Greg Williams (as football director), Lincoln Indicators co-founder Tim Lincoln, communications strategist Lahra Carey and JPMorgan Australia and New Zealand chairman Robert Priestly; Jeanne Pratt, Chris Townshend and football director Chris Judd all departed.

Onfield, Sam Docherty stepped aside from the co-captaincy and leadership group, doing so to focus on his recovery from treatment for testicular cancer with which he was diagnosed in August 2021. Docherty had served as co-captain with Patrick Cripps for the previous three seasons. Cripps continued as co-captain, with Sam Walsh and Jacob Weitering serving as vice-captains and no broader leadership group named.

== Squad for 2022 ==
The following was Carlton's squad for the 2022 season.

Statistics are correct as of end of 2021 season.

Senior List
No.	Player	Age	AFL Debut	Recruited from	Career (to end 2021)		2022 Player Statistics
No.	Player	Age	AFL Debut	Recruited from	Gms	Gls	Gms	Gls	B	D	K	HB	M	T	HO
1	Jack Silvagni	24	2016	Oakleigh (U18)	78	56	21	17	14	298	185	113	102	64	72
2	Paddy Dow	22	2018	Bendigo (U18)	59	19	4	0	1	34	12	22	5	6	0
3	Jesse Motlop	18	2022	South Fremantle	–	–	12	12	6	100	55	45	22	29	0
5	Adam Cerra	22	2018	Eastern (U18), Fremantle	76	16	18	5	3	420	212	208	65	84	0
6	Zac Williams	27	2013	GWS Academy, GWS	127	32	9	0	0	176	136	40	37	11	0
7	Matthew Kennedy	24	2016	Collingullie-Glenfield Park, GWS	61	29	17	7	7	416	210	206	78	69	0
8	Lachie Fogarty	22	2018	Western (U18), Geelong	40	12	3	0	1	24	10	14	5	5	0
9	Patrick Cripps (c)	26	2014	East Fremantle	138	67	21	20	9	591	226	365	76	105	11
10	Harry McKay	24	2017	Gippsland (U18)	67	129	19	45	31	217	169	48	114	25	23
11	Mitch McGovern	27	2016	Claremont, Adelaide	81	104	7	0	1	104	85	19	45	13	0
12	Tom de Koning	22	2018	Dandenong (U18)	22	8	19	4	6	207	120	87	49	46	326
13	Liam Stocker	21	2019	Sandringham (U18)	22	2	6	0	0	66	45	21	12	11	0
15	Sam Docherty	28	2013	Gippsland (U18), Brisbane Lions	122	14	22	3	1	625	424	201	160	73	0
16	Jack Carroll	19	2022	East Fremantle	–	–	5	1	1	66	45	21	24	3	0
17	Brodie Kemp	20	2021	Bendigo (U18)	2	0	4	0	0	44	28	16	18	2	0
18	Sam Walsh (vc)	21	2019	Geelong (U18)	61	26	20	5	7	642	286	356	91	66	0
19	Corey Durdin	19	2021	Central District	2	1	21	15	11	183	118	65	40	48	0
20	Lachie Plowman	27	2013	Calder (U18), GWS	129	2	15	0	0	174	89	85	52	26	0
21	Jack Martin	26	2014	Claremont, Gold Coast	123	101	12	12	11	114	74	40	40	31	0
22	Caleb Marchbank	25	2015	Murray (U18), GWS	48	0	4	0	0	37	25	12	14	7	0
23	Jacob Weitering (vc)	23	2016	Dandenong (U18)	115	10	18	1	0	216	169	47	109	16	3
24	Nic Newman	28	2017	Frankston, Sydney	67	14	19	0	1	372	252	120	118	44	0
25	Zac Fisher	23	2017	Perth	73	31	22	18	16	416	232	184	69	45	0
27	Marc Pittonet	25	2016	Oakleigh (U18), Hawthorn	33	5	8	0	1	80	26	54	12	13	168
28	David Cuningham	24	2016	Oakleigh (U18)	41	23	–	–	–	–	–	–	–	–	–
29	George Hewett	26	2016	North Adelaide, Sydney	120	32	15	4	5	427	170	257	51	73	0
30	Charlie Curnow	24	2016	Geelong (U18)	62	79	22	64	42	264	231	33	126	35	1
31	Tom Williamson	24	2017	North Ballarat (U18)	43	4	1	0	0	0	0	0	0	0	0
32	Jack Newnes	28	2012	Northern (U18)	191	72	16	4	5	231	146	85	65	31	0
33	Lewis Young	23	2017	Sturt, Western Bulldogs	24	1	19	1	0	255	154	101	102	26	6
34	Sam Philp	20	2020	Northern (U18)	2	1	–	–	–	–	–	–	–	–	–
35	Ed Curnow	32	2011	Geelong (U18), Adelaide, Box Hill	204	50	–	–	–	–	–	–	–	–	–
36	Josh Honey	20	2020	Western (U18)	6	6	5	1	2	37	12	25	8	5	0
42	Adam Saad	27	2015	Calder (U18), Coburg, Gold Coast, Essendon	131	10	21	0	0	459	323	136	100	47	0
43	Will Setterfield	23	2017	Sandringham (U18), GWS	44	11	13	1	3	214	131	83	51	30	0
Senior List
No.	Player	Age	AFL Debut	Recruited from	Career (to end 2020)		2021 Player Statistics
No.	Player	Age	AFL Debut	Recruited from	Gms	Gls	Gms	Gls	B	D	K	HB	M	T	HO
4	Lochie O'Brien	22	2018	Bendigo (U18)	41	11	19	5	9	337	238	99	98	27	0
26	Luke Parks	20	2021	Sydney Academy, Glenelg	6	0	2	0	0	16	8	8	5	1	0
37	Jordan Boyd	23	2022	Western (U18), Footscray reserves	–	–	7	0	1	79	51	28	21	13	0
38	Sam Durdin	25	2017	West Adelaide, North Melbourne, Glenelg	22	1	1	0	0	9	4	5	2	2	0
39	Oscar McDonald	25	2015	North Ballarat (U18), Melbourne	84	3	2	0	0	24	18	6	10	0	0
40	Will Hayes	26	2019	Sandringham (U18), Footscray reserves, Western Bulldogs, Carlton reserves	11	4	2	0	0	28	15	13	7	1	0
41	Domanic Akuei	19	–	Carlton academy	–	–	–	–	–	–	–	–	–	–	–
44	Matthew Owies	24	2020	St Kevin's, Seattle Redhawks	14	15	17	14	11	162	103	59	43	66	0
45	Alex Mirkov	22	–	Carlton reserves	–	–	–	–	–	–	–	–	–	–	–
46	Matthew Cottrell	21	2020	Dandenong (U18)	19	5	18	9	2	267	159	108	71	32	0
Senior coaching panel
	Coach	Coaching position				Carlton Coaching debut		Former clubs as coach
	Michael Voss	Senior coach				2022		Brisbane Lions (s), Port Adelaide (a)
	Luke Power	Head of development				2020		GWS (a), AFL Academy Manager
	Tim Clarke	Assistant coach (Midfield)				2016		Richmond (a), Coburg (s), Richmond reserves (s), Gold Coast (a)
	Aaron Hamill	Assistant coach (backline)				2022		St Kilda (a), Sandringham (s)
	Ashley Hansen	Assistant coach (forwards)				2022		Western Bulldogs (a), Footscray reserves (s)
	Matthew Kreuzer	Assistant coach (ruck)				2022
	Daniel O'Keefe	Development coach (midfield), Reserves coach				2020		Geelong Falcons (s), Geelong reserves (a)
	Torin Baker	Carlton College of Sport and Academy coach				2021		Western Jets (s), Hawthorn (d)
	Aaron Greaves	Coaching and innovation manager				2022		Melbourne (d, a), Port Adelaide (a, d), North Melbourne (d), AFL umpires (s)

- For players: (c) denotes captain, (vc) denotes vice-captain.
- For coaches: (s) denotes senior coach, (cs) denotes caretaker senior coach, (a) denotes assistant coach, (d) denotes development coach, (m) denotes managerial or administrative role in a football or coaching department

Additionally, under the league's 2022 COVID-19 policies, twenty players from the club's reserves list were nominated as top-up players, who would have become eligible to play senior football if the club's primary list was reduced below 28 players due to isolation requirements for COVID-19 positive players. These top-up players were: Ned Cahill, Alex Cincotta, Josh Cripps, Ben Crocker, Jesse Glass-McCasker, Luke Goetz, Hugh Hamilton, David Handley, Will Hayes, Cody Hirst, Tyreece Leiu, Michael Lewis, Zavier Maher, Tom North, Stefan Radovanovic, Oliver Sanders, Matt Shannon, Cooper Stephens, Joel Trudgeon and Toby Wooller. None were called up to play.

== Playing list changes ==
The following summarises all player changes which occurred after the 2021 season. Unless otherwise noted, draft picks refer to selections in the 2021 National Draft.

For the second consecutive season, the club lost two of its four most experienced players to retirement at the end of the previous season: Marc Murphy retired after 300 games, and Eddie Betts retired after 350 games (218 for Carlton). The club also unexpectedly lost full back Liam Jones to early retirement in November, after he declined comply with the league mandates related to the COVID-19 vaccine for all players; he was the first AFL men's player to retire over the vaccine.

The club was almost inactive during the draft, bringing in only one new player through the drafts and making its other additions through trades and other channels.

=== In ===
Player	Former Club	League	via
George Hewett	Sydney	AFL	Signed as a restricted free agent; Sydney received an end-of-second-round compensatory draft selection.
Adam Cerra	Fremantle	AFL	Trade period, in exchange for a first-round selection (provisionally No. 6) and a third-round selection in the 2022 National Draft.
Lewis Young	Western Bulldogs	AFL	Trade period, in a three-way trade which saw the Western Bulldogs receive a third round selection (provisionally No. 52) from West Coast, and saw West Coast gain Sam Petrevski-Seton from Carlton.
Jesse Motlop	South Fremantle	WAFL	2021 National Draft, second round selection (No. 27 overall).
Domanic Akuei	Carlton academy/Northern (U18)	NAB League	Listed as a Category B rookie, academy selection.
Sam Durdin	Glenelg	SANFL	2022 Midseason Draft, first round selection (No. 13 overall).
Will Hayes	Carlton reserves	VFL	2022 Midseason Draft, second round selection (No. 22 overall).

=== Out ===
Player	New Club	League	via
Eddie Betts			Retired
Marc Murphy			Retired
Levi Casboult	Gold Coast	AFL	Delisted after the season He was then drafted by Gold Coast in the rookie draft with its first round selection (No. 3 overall).
Sam Petrevski-Seton	West Coast	Australian Football League	Trade period, in a three-way trade which saw Carlton gain Lewis Young from the Western Bulldogs, and the Western Bulldogs receive a third round selection (provisionally No. 52) from West Coast.
Michael Gibbons	Yarrawonga	O&MFL	Delisted after the season
Sam Ramsay	South Adelaide	SANFL	Delisted after the season
Liam Jones	Palm Beach Currumbin	QAFL	Retired after the trade period
Tom Williamson	North Melbourne reserves	VFL	Retired after Round 16 due to personal issues, having previously taken a leave of absence following Round 12.

=== List management ===
Player	Change
Matthew Kennedy	Elevated from the rookie list to the senior list.
Josh Honey	Elevated from the rookie list to the senior list.
Lochie O'Brien	Demoted from the senior list to the rookie list. Formally, he was delisted and then redrafted in the rookie draft with a first round selection (No. 6 overall).
Matt Cottrell	Retained on the rookie list. Formally, he was delisted and then redrafted in the rookie draft with a second round selection (No. 19 overall).
Corey Durdin	Changed guernsey number from 29 to 19.
Josh Cripps; Tyreece Leiu	Invited to train with the club during the preseason ahead of the supplemental selection period.

== Season summary ==
=== Pre-season ===
The club played two full-length practice matches in the lead-up to the season. The match against Melbourne was scheduled as part of the 2022 AAMI Community Series, and the match against St Kilda was arranged between the clubs.

**Date and local time**	**Opponent**	**Scores** (Carlton's scores indicated in **bold**)			**Venue**	**Attendance**
**Date and local time**	**Opponent**	Home	Away	Result	**Venue**	**Attendance**
Thursday, 24 February (10:00 am)	St Kilda	**9.13 (67)**	8.12 (60)	Won by 7 points	Ikon Park (H)	
Thursday, 3 March (7:20 pm)	Melbourne	**15.8 (98)**	14.9 (93)	Won by 5 points	Marvel Stadium (H)	5,765

=== Premiership season ===
Carlton's 2022 season opened strongly. The club won its first three games – it had opened its last nine seasons 0–2 – and went on to sit with an 8–2 record after ten rounds. The strong record was aided by an easier start to the year with only two of those ten matches played against eventual top-six teams, although results were characterised by a number of severe second-half fade-outs: against Western Bulldogs (led by 35 points, won by 12); Hawthorn (led by 41 points, won by 1); Port Adelaide (led by 50 points, won by 3); and Sydney (led by 38 points, won by 15). Particular praise went to the club's midfield, which dominated clearances for much of the first half of the season, buoyed in part by recruits Adam Cerra and George Hewett and strong form by others.

The second half of the season saw a more challenging fixture, with six out of twelve games against the eventual top six. The middle phase of the year also saw the club struggle with injuries to key defenders, in all suffering the unplanned absences of seven key defenders, including Liam Jones' retirement, Caleb Marchbank suffering an injury in his first game back after two years of injuries and Sam Durdin – recruited in the midseason draft specifically to cover the club's key defender injury list – also injured on debut for the club. Nevertheless, the club kept in touch with a top four chance, and after alternating wins and losses over an eight week period sat seventh with a 12–6 record after Round 19.

Entering the final month of the year, Carlton needed only one win or draw to secure a finals berth, and failed to secure it in Round 20 with an upset loss against eventual 14th-placed Adelaide. That left only three eventual top-six opponents: Brisbane Lions (6th), Melbourne (2nd) and Collingwood (4th). Against Brisbane, Carlton trailed late in the third quarter by 58 points; an eight-goal final quarter narrowed the margin to as close as 15 points before eventually losing by 33. In a close match against Melbourne in which the margin never exceeded two goals, Carlton secured an 8-point lead in the 30th minute, before two late goals to Melbourne – the last with 11 seconds remaining – resulted in a 5-point loss. Finally against Collingwood, Carlton kicked eight goals to one in the third quarter to open a 24-point three-quarter time lead, before conceding 5.1 to 0.6 in the final quarter to lose by one point. The loss saw Carlton replaced in the final eight by the Western Bulldogs, who had won their last two games, on percentage by 0.6%pts – the equivalent of ten on-field points across the year. The result saw Carlton become the first team since Carlton's 1977 team to miss the finals, after spending every week of the year in a finals position on the ladder.

Across the entire season, Carlton's record against the top six (who finished with 15 or more wins) was 2–6, including three losses by less than a goal; against the middle six (who finished with 10–13½ wins), its record was 3–3; and against the bottom six (8 wins or fewer), its record was 7–1, the sole loss coming against Adelaide. The 12–10 record was Carlton's best since 2011, and its finishing position of 9th was its best since 2013.

**Rd**	**Date and local time**	**Opponent**	**Scores** (Carlton's scores indicated in **bold**)			**Venue**	**Attendance**	**Ladder**
**Rd**	**Date and local time**	**Opponent**	Home	Away	Result	**Venue**	**Attendance**	**Ladder**
1	Thursday, 17 March (7:25 pm)	Richmond	**14.17 (101)**	11.10 (76)	Won by 25 points	Melbourne Cricket Ground (H)	72,179	5th
2	Thursday, 24 March (7:25 pm)	Western Bulldogs	13.12 (90)	**16.6 (102)**	Won by 12 points	Marvel Stadium (A)	34,961	6th
3	Sunday, 3 April (1:10 pm)	Hawthorn	**11.8 (74)**	11.7 (73)	Won by 1 point	Melbourne Cricket Ground (H)	66,317	3rd
4	Sunday, 10 April (4:10 pm)	Gold Coast	**8.14 (62)**	13.14 (92)	Lost by 30 points	Metricon Stadium (A)	14,349	7th
5	Saturday, 16 April (1:40 pm)	Port Adelaide	**14.10 (94)**	13.13 (91)	Won by 3 points	Melbourne Cricket Ground (H)	33,433	6th
6	Saturday, 23 April (5:40 pm)	Fremantle	14.13 (97)	**9.8 (62)**	Lost by 35 points	Optus Stadium (A)	42,302	7th
7	Saturday, 30 April (7:25 pm)	North Melbourne	**17.12 (114)**	10.4 (64)	Won by 50 points	Marvel Stadium (H)	40,129	6th
8	Sunday, 8 May (4:40 pm)	Adelaide	**17.14 (116)**	10.8 (68)	Won by 48 points	Marvel Stadium (H)	25,376	4th
9	Sunday, 15 May (3:20 pm)	GWS	11.9 (75)	**15.15 (105)**	Won by 30 points	GIANTS Stadium (A)	8,754	4th
10	Friday, 20 May (7:50 pm)	Sydney	**15.12 (102)**	13.9 (87)	Won by 15 points	Marvel Stadium (H)	44,769	3rd
11	Sunday, 29 May (3:20 pm)	Collingwood	11.13 (79)	**11.9 (75)**	Lost by 4 points	Melbourne Cricket Ground (A)	80,627	5th
12	Bye							7th
13	Friday, 10 June (7:50 pm)	Essendon	7.12 (54)	**12.8 (80)**	Won by 26 points	Melbourne Cricket Ground (A)	65,440	4th
14	Thursday, 16 June (7:20 pm)	Richmond	11.15 (81)	**9.12 (66)**	Lost by 15 points	Melbourne Cricket Ground (A)	50,741	5th
15	Saturday, 25 June (1:45 pm)	Fremantle	**12.9 (81)**	7.8 (50)	Won by 31 points	Marvel Stadium (H)	35,441	5th
16	Friday, 1 July (7:50 pm)	St Kilda	**10.18 (78)**	14.9 (93)	Lost by 15 points	Marvel Stadium (H)	43,194	5th
17	Sunday, 10 July (1:45 pm)	West Coast	8.5 (53)	**17.14 (116)**	Won by 63 points	Optus Stadium (A)	43,359	5th
18	Saturday, 16 July (7:25 pm)	Geelong	**8.7 (55)**	12.13 (85)	Lost by 30 points	Melbourne Cricket Ground (H)	68,208	7th
19	Sunday, 24 July (1:10 pm)	Greater Western Sydney	**13.12 (90)**	8.6 (54)	Won by 36 points	Marvel Stadium (H)	30,295	7th
20	Saturday, 30 July (7:00 pm)	Adelaide	12.12 (84)	**8.7 (55)**	Lost by 29 points	Adelaide Oval (A)	35,666	7th
21	Sunday, 7 August (3:20 pm)	Brisbane Lions	17.12 (114)	**12.9 (81)**	Lost by 33 points	The Gabba (A)	31,011	7th
22	Saturday, 13 August (7:25 pm)	Melbourne	11.13 (79)	**10.14 (74)**	Lost by 5 points	Melbourne Cricket Ground (A)	55,705	8th
23	Sunday, 21 August (3:20 pm)	Collingwood	**10.14 (74)**	**11.9 (75)**	Lost by 1 point	Melbourne Cricket Ground (H)	88,287	9th

Notable events

- Round 1: Carlton won its first match against Richmond since the 2013 Elimination Final, ending an 11-game losing streak. It was the end of Carlton's longest ever losing streak against Richmond.
- Round 1: Carlton won its annual Round 1 match against Richmond for the first time since 2012.
- Round 13: Essendon hosted Carlton in a match which commemorated the 150th anniversary of Essendon's establishment.

== Individual awards and records ==
=== John Nicholls Medal ===
The Carlton Football Club Best and Fairest awards night took place on 30 September 2022.

John Nicholls Medal

The winner of the John Nicholls Medal was Patrick Cripps, who polled 181 votes to win the award for the fourth time in his career, joining John Nicholls (5) and Bruce Doull (4) as the club's only four-time winners. 2016 winner Sam Docherty finished second with 173 votes, and 2021 winner Sam Walsh was third with 163 votes.

Pos.	Player	Votes
1st	Patrick Cripps	181
2nd	Sam Docherty	173
3rd	Sam Walsh	163
4th	Charlie Curnow	149
5th	George Hewett	125
6th	Adam Saad	124
7th	Harry McKay	123
8th	Zac Fisher	117
9th	Matthew Kennedy	111
10th	Adam Cerra	105

Other awards

The following other awards were presented on John Nicholls Medal night:-

- Best Young Player – Corey Durdin
- Best Clubman – Nic Newman
- Spirit of Carlton Award – Sam Docherty
- Bill Lanyon Inner Blue Ruthless Award – Patrick Cripps
- Carltonians William A. Cook Award – Patrick Cripps
- Coaches' Award – Patrick Cripps
- Players' Award – Patrick Cripps

=== Brownlow Medal ===
Patrick Cripps won the 2022 Brownlow Medal. He polled 29 votes to finish one vote ahead of second-placed Lachie Neale (Brisbane). It was Cripps' first Brownlow Medal; he later won a second in 2024. He became the sixth Carlton player to win the award, and the first since Chris Judd in 2010.

Cripps established outright favouritism for the award early in the season after being the stand-out in a number of early season games dominated by the Carlton midfield; and indeed by Round 8 he had polled 16 votes from only six full games played; but, with leaner returns through the middle part of the season, he drifted to third favourite behind Neale and Clayton Oliver (Melbourne) by the time of the count. His chance at the medal almost came to an end in Round 20 when he was suspended by the Match Review Panel and AFL Tribunal for rough conduct in a front-on contest against Brisbane Lions' Callum Ah Chee, which would have ruled him ineligible and seen him miss the final rounds in which he polled the winning votes; but, Carlton had successfully had the suspension overturned by the AFL Appeals Board.

=== Leading goalkickers ===
Charlie Curnow won the Coleman Medal as the league's leading goalkicker in the home-and-away season for the first time in his career; and Carlton's leading goalkicker for the second time, having previously won it in 2018. Curnow kicked 64 goals, which was the most by any Carlton player in a season since Brendan Fevola kicked 89 goals in 2009. His Coleman Medal was achieved in his first full season after missing more than two seasons with a series of knee injuries – he had not played a senior game between Round 15, 2019 and Round 20, 2021. It was Carlton's second consecutive Coleman Medal, Harry McKay having won the medal in 2021; it was the first time a club had won consecutive VFL/AFL Leading Goalkicker awards by different players since Albert Thurgood and Fred Hiskins achieved the feat for Essendon in 1900 and 1901.

McKay finished second, as he and Curnow combined for more than 100 goals as key forwards in the same forward line. Patrick Cripps and Zac Fisher were next as goalkicking midfielders, followed by Jack Silvagni as a third tall forward.

Player	Goals	Behinds
Charlie Curnow	64	42
Harry McKay	45	31
Patrick Cripps	20	9
Zac Fisher	18	16
Jack Silvagni	17	14

=== Other awards ===
Honorific teams

- All-Australian team – three Carlton players were named in the 2022 All-Australian team: Patrick Cripps at rover, whose selection was the third of his career and who was named vice-captain of the team; Adam Saad at half-back flank, for the first time in his career; and Charlie Curnow in the forward pocket, also for the first time. Sam Walsh and Jacob Weitering were also named in the extended 44-man squad.
- 22under22 team – two Carlton players – Sam Walsh and Adam Cerra – were named in the 22under22 team for the 2022 season. It was Walsh's fourth selection, and he was named vice-captain of the team; it was Cerra's third selection, the first two occurring while he was at Fremantle.

Statistical leaders

- Adam Saad led the league in running bounces for the second consecutive season, with 113, his tally more than doubling that of his nearest rival.

Club records

- Round 7 – Three minutes into the match, Jack Carroll on debut kicked a goal with his first career kick.
- Round 23 – Patrick Cripps recorded 27 contested possession, setting a new Carlton Football Club record and breaking the previous record of 25 shared by Chris Judd (2011) and Cripps (2018).
- Lewis Young recorded 217 one-percenters for the season, setting a new Carlton Football Club record and breaking Sam Rowe's 2016 record of 215. He also twice set the club's game record for one-percenters, recording 22 in Round 14 against Richmond and 25 in Round 22 against Melbourne, breaking Rowe's record of 19; the latter matched Harris Andrews' (Brisbane Lions) league record, set in 2018.
- Patrick Cripps' Brownlow Medal and Charlie Curnow's Coleman Medal marked the second time Carlton players had won both awards in the same year; the first occurred in 1961 when John James won the Brownlow Medal and Tom Carroll won the Coleman Medal.

Australian Football Hall of Fame

- Mike Fitzpatrick was inducted into the Australian Football Hall of Fame during the 2022 season. Fitzpatrick played 150 for Carlton from 1975 until 1983, playing in the 1979, 1981 and 1982 premierships and captaining the club from 1980 to 1983, and was then a club director from 1989 until 1995. Inducted in the administrator category, both his playing and administration careers were celebrated upon his induction.

== AFL Women's ==
=== 2022 AFL Women's season 6 ===
Squad

The club's women's squad saw four prominent departures between seasons. Co-captain Katie Loynes and equal club games record holder Alison Downie (39 games) were both delisted, joining Greater Western Sydney and Collingwood respectively. Tayla Harris, the club's most marketable player, was traded to Melbourne as part of a multi-club trade after she and Carlton were unable to reach terms on a new contract. Inaugural player Jess Hosking also departed for Richmond, where her twin sister Sarah had moved in 2021.

Carlton gained inaugural GWS player Jessica Dal Pos as part of the Harris trade, the club's only experienced recruit for the season. Annie Lee, Keeley Sherar, Brooke Vickers and Imogen Milford joined the club through the draft.

The club's season 6 squad is given below. Numbers in parentheses represent games played and goals kicked in the season.

Carlton Football Club (2022 AFL Women's season 6)
Senior list		Coaching staff
1 Grace Egan (7,0); 2 Jessica Dal Pos (vc) (10,0); 3 Darcy Vescio (vc) (10,7); 4 Maddy Prespakis (10,1); 5 Abbie McKay (10,3); 6 Gab Pound (8,0); 7 Brooke Walker (6,1); 8 Vaomua Laloifi (10,0); 9 Kerryn Harrington (c) (10,0); 10 Mimi Hill (6,0); 11 Annie Lee (3,0); 12 Lauren Brazzale (5,0); 13 Lucy McEvoy (9,1); 15 Jess Good (8,4); 16 Breann Moody (9,2)	17 Charlotte Hammans (1,0); 18 Maddy Guerin (6,0); 19 Georgia Gee (10,5); 20 Charlotte Wilson (3,0); 21 Nicola Stevens (10,7); 22 Courtney Jones(9,8); 23 Daisy Walker (10,0); 24 Brooke Vickers (3,0); 25 Keeley Sherar (6,2); 26 Paige Trudgeon (10,0); 28 Imogen Milford (0,0); 31 Brooke Vernon (0,0); 32 Natalie Plane (10,0); 33 Serena Gibbs (0,0); 33 Poppy Schaap (1,0); 46 Elise O'Dea (vc) (10,1)	**Head coach**: Daniel Harford; **Assistant coaches**: Steven Salopek (midfield); Kade Simpson (forwards); Nic Newman (backline); Shaun Hampson (ruck); Wayne Schultz (skills acquisition); Legend: (c) Captain(s); (vc) Vice-captain(s); Updated: 6 November 2026; Source(s): Senior list, Coaching staff

Season

Carlton finished eighth out of fourteen for 2022 AFL Women's season 6, with a 4–6 win-loss record, to miss the finals. The club's form was overall consistent with its finishing position, with an 0–6 record against the top six teams – its best result in those games being a one point loss against second-placed Melbourne – and a 4–0 record in the four matches played against other bottom eight teams.

**Rd**	**Date and local time**	**Opponent**	**Scores** (Carlton's scores indicated in **bold**)			**Venue**	**Attendance**	**Ladder**
**Rd**	**Date and local time**	**Opponent**	Home	Away	Result	**Venue**	**Attendance**	**Ladder**
1	Sunday, 9 January (4:10 pm)	Collingwood	**3.7 (25)**	6.8 (44)	Lost by 19 points	Ikon Park (H)	3,511	10th
2	Saturday, 15 January (7:10 pm)	Geelong	2.5 (17)	**4.7 (31)**	Won by 14 points	GMHBA Stadium (A)	2,144	7th
3	Tuesday, 25 January (7:10 pm)	Brisbane	9.9 (63)	**4.4 (28)**	Lost by 35 points	Metricon Stadium (A)	814	9th
4	Sunday, 30 January (3:10 pm)	Kangaroos	**3.3 (21)**	7.9 (51)	Lost by 30 points	Ikon Park (H)	2,329	10th
5	Sunday, 6 February (3:10 pm)	Adelaide	**1.6 (12)**	7.9 (51)	Lost by 39 points	Ikon Park (H)	1,403	13th
6	Saturday, 12 February (3:10 pm)	Fremantle	7.9 (51)	**1.3 (9)**	Lost by 42 points	Optus Stadium (A)	2,524	13th
7	Saturday, 19 February (5:10 pm)	St Kilda	**7.6 (48)**	0.2 (2)	Won by 46 points	Ikon Park (H)	1,642	10th
8	Sunday, 27 February (7:10 pm)	GWS	5.3 (33)	**7.9 (51)**	Won by 18 points	Manuka Oval (A)	1,839	9th
9	Sunday, 6 March (5:10 pm)	Gold Coast	**7.4 (46)**	2.4 (16)	Won by 30 points	Ikon Park (H)	1,052	8th
10	Saturday, 12 March (7:10 pm)	Melbourne	5.4 (34)	**5.3 (33)**	Lost by 1 point	Casey Fields (A)	2,524	8th

Notable events

- Round 2: Carlton's originally fixtured match against Brisbane in Maroochydore was cancelled at two days notice, as Brisbane had too many players isolating for COVID-19 field a team. Carlton was redrawn to play Geelong, whose original opponent Western Bulldogs was unable to play for the same reason.
- Round 3: Carlton's originally fixtured match against Western Bulldogs at VU Whitten Oval was cancelled at three days notice, the Bulldogs still unable to field a team. Carlton was redrawn to play Brisbane at Metricon Stadium on the following Tuesday night, which was now available to field a team and whose opponent original Gold Coast was unable to play.
- Round 7: St Kilda's score of 0.2 (2) set a new record as the lowest score conceded by Carlton in an AFLW game.
- Round 8: Darcy Vescio became the first player to kick 50 career AFLW goals.

League awards

- Mimi Hill was the winner of the AFL Women's Rising Star award.
- One Carlton players was selected in the All-Australian team: Kerryn Harrington, who was selected on the interchange bench. Two other players were named in the 40-woman squad: Mimi Hill and Breann Moody.

Club Awards

- Maddy Prespakis won the club's best and fairest award, polling 60 votes to finish ahead of Kerryn Harrington (57 votes) and Mimi Hill (54 votes).
- Kerryn Harrington won the Most Valuable Bluebagger award.
- Daisy Walker won the coaches' award.
- Paige Trudgeon won the Rookie of the Year award.

=== 2022 AFL Women's season 7 ===
Squad

The women's squad saw a large number of prominent departures between seasons – two-time best and fairest Maddy Prespakis and former All-Australian squad member Georgia Gee both joined the fledgling Essendon team, and the club lost five experienced players to trades: former All-Australian Nicola Stevens (St Kilda) four-year player Charlotte Wilson (Melbourne) inaugural player Lauren Brazzale (Collingwood), three-year player Grace Egan (Richmond), and first year player Courtney Jones (Gold Coast). Brooke Vernon was delisted.

Carlton gained two players through trades: Amelia Velardo (Collingwood) as part of the Brazzale trade, and inaugural GWS player Phoebe McWilliams from Geelong in a trade for draft picks; and recruited college basketballer Taylor Ortlepp as a rookie. Four players added through the draft were: Keeley Skepper (pick No. 17), Mia Austin (pick no. 18), Lily Goss (pick No. 48) and Jessica Jones (pick No. 67).

The club's 2022 AFL Women's season 7 squad is given below. Numbers in parentheses represent games played and goals kicked in the season.

Carlton Football Club (2022 AFL Women's season 7)
Senior list		Coaching staff
1 Amelia Velardo (8,0); 2 Jessica Dal Pos (10,2); 3 Darcy Vescio (vc) (9,4); 4 Keeley Skepper (9,3); 5 Abbie McKay (10,0); 6 Gab Pound (8,3); 7 Brooke Walker (4,0); 8 Vaomua Laloifi (10,1); 9 Kerryn Peterson (c) (10,3); 10 Mimi Hill (10,1); 11 Annie Lee (9,1); 12 Jess Good (10,1); 13 Lucy McEvoy (10,0); 16 Breann Moody (10,6); 17 Charlotte Hammans (1,0)	18 Maddy Guerin (3,0); 21 Lily Goss (4,0); 22 Mia Austin (2,2); 23 Daisy Walker (10,0); 24 Brooke Vickers (10,0); 25 Keeley Sherar (10,0); 26 Paige Trudgeon (9,0); 28 Imogen Milford (5,1); 32 Natalie Plane (5,0); 33 Serena Gibbs (3,0); 34 Taylor Ortlepp (5,1); 35 Poppy Schaap (2,3); 37 Phoebe McWilliams (4,1); 44 Christina Bernardi (1,0); 46 Elise O'Dea (vc) (9,3)	**Head coach**: Daniel Harford; **Assistant coaches**: Steven Salopek (midfield); Kade Simpson (forwards); Nic Newman (backline); Shaun Hampson (ruck); Wayne Schultz (skills acquisition); Legend: (c) Captain(s); (vc) Vice-captain(s); Updated: 6 November 2026; Source(s): Senior list, Coaching staff

Season

Carlton finished fourteenth out of eighteen for season 7, with a 2–6–2 record, finishing fourteen points out of the finals, its worst performance since 2018's wooden spoon. The team's record was 0–4 against the top eight clubs, 2–2–1 against the clubs between 9th and 13th, and 0–0–1 in its only game against a bottom four team.

**Rd**	**Date and local time**	**Opponent**	**Scores** (Carlton's scores indicated in **bold**)			**Venue**	**Attendance**	**Ladder**
**Rd**	**Date and local time**	**Opponent**	Home	Away	Result	**Venue**	**Attendance**	**Ladder**
1	Thursday, 25 August (7:10 pm)	Collingwood	**3.0 (18)**	5.6 (36)	Lost by 18 points	Ikon Park (H)	4,128	15th
2	Sunday, 4 September (11:10 am)	Essendon	4.7 (31)	**5.2 (32)**	Won by 1 point	ETU Stadium (A)	2,738	11th
3	Sunday, 11 September (12:10 pm)	Port Adelaide	**4.3 (27)**	4.3 (27)	Match drawn	Ikon Park (H)	1,664	9th
4	Saturday, 17 September (12:05 pm)	Fremantle	5.2 (32)	**5.2 (32)**	Match drawn	Fremantle Community Bank Oval (A)	1,023	11th
5	Friday, 23 September (7:30 pm)	Melbourne	**1.2 (8)**	7.8 (50)	Lost by 42 points	Ikon Park (H)	1,580	12th
6	Saturday, 1 October (12:10 pm)	GWS	4.5 (29)	**1.6 (12)**	Lost by 17 points	Henson Park (A)	1,162	14th
7	Friday, 7 October (6:10 pm)	St Kilda	2.5 (17)	**6.8 (44)**	Won by 27 points	RSEA Park (A)	1,234	10th
8	Friday, 14 October (6:30 pm)	Richmond	**5.4 (34)**	6.8 (44)	Lost by 10 points	Ikon Park (H)	1,919	11th
9	Friday, 21 October (6:40 pm)	Gold Coast	6.6 (42)	**2.3 (15)**	Lost by 27 points	Metricon Stadium (A)	683	12th
10	Friday, 28 October (6:10 pm)	Western Bulldogs	**4.7 (31)**	5.4 (34)	Lost by 3 points	Ikon Park (H)	1,193	14th

League awards

- One Carlton player was selected in the All-Australian team: Breann Moody, who was selected as first ruck – it was Moody's second time selected to the team. One other player was named in the 42-woman squad: Vaomua Laloifi.

Club Awards

- Mimi Hill won the club's best and fairest award, polling 86 votes to finish ahead of Abbie McKay (84 votes) and Breann Moody (61 votes).
- Vaomua Laloifi won the Most Valuable Bluebagger award.
- Lucy McEvoy won the coaches' award.
- Keeley Skepper won the Rookie of the Year award.

== Reserves ==
Carlton fielded reserves teams in the men's and women's competitions during the 2022 season.

=== Men's ===
Carlton's men's reserves team contested its fifth VFL season; and its 85th overall season of reserves and state level competition dating back to 1919.

Daniel O'Keefe continued as the reserves coach for his second season. VFL-listed players newly signed to the team included former AFL senior players Ned Cahill (Essendon), Will Hayes (Western Bulldogs); former rookie player Jesse Glass-McCasker (Carlton); father-son prospect Charlie McKay (son of Andrew McKay); Carlton's offseason train-on players Josh Cripps and Tyreece Leiu; and Luke Goetz, Hugh Hamilton, David Handley, Michael Lewis, Charlie McKay, Mitchell Moschetti, Darcy Porter, Oliver Sanders, Hamish Sinnott, Archie Stevens and Joel Trudgeon. Retained from the 2021 squad were Zane Barzen, Alex Cincotta, Ben Crocker, Aaron Gundry, Cody Hirst, Owen King, Tom North, Stefan Radovanovic, Matt Shannon, Cooper Stephens, Lachlan Swaney and Toby Wooller. Matt Shannon, who was co-captain with Ryley Stoddart in 2021, continued as sole captain in 2022.

The team finished 7th out of 21 in the home-and-away season, with an 11–7 win-loss record, to qualify for the finals. It was the first time Carlton's reserves team or reserves affiliate (the Northern Bullants) had reached the finals since 2011. Like the senior team, the Carlton reserves had to win a final round game against Collingwood to secure its finals position, doing so by ten points in a curtain raiser to the senior game. Carlton faced Collingwood again the following week, winning the elimination final comfortably. They were then eliminated in the semi-final by Brisbane; after trailing by 32 points late in the third quarter, Carlton fought back, and scores were level with two minutes remaining before Brisbane kicked the last two goals and won by twelve points. As such, Carlton finished the season in 6th place. Senior listed player Paddy Dow won the reserves best and fairest.

Reserves finals matches

**Week**	**Date and local time**	**Opponent**	**Scores** (Carlton's scores indicated in **bold**)			**Venue**
**Week**	**Date and local time**	**Opponent**	Home	Away	Result	**Venue**
Elimination Final	Sunday, 28 August (1:05 pm)	Collingwood	10.8 (68)	**15.10 (100)**	Won by 32 points	Victoria Park (A)
Semi Final	Saturday, 3 September (12:05 pm)	Brisbane	11.6 (72)	**8.12 (60)**	Lost by 12 points	Moreton Bay Sports Complex (A)

=== Women's ===
The club fielded a team in the VFL Women's competition for the fourth time. Carlton finished 9th out of 12 clubs to miss the finals, with a record of 4–9–1. The team was coached by Tom Stafford and captained by Ally Bild. Millie Klingbeil won the best and fairest.
