= Corey Durdin =

Australian rules footballer

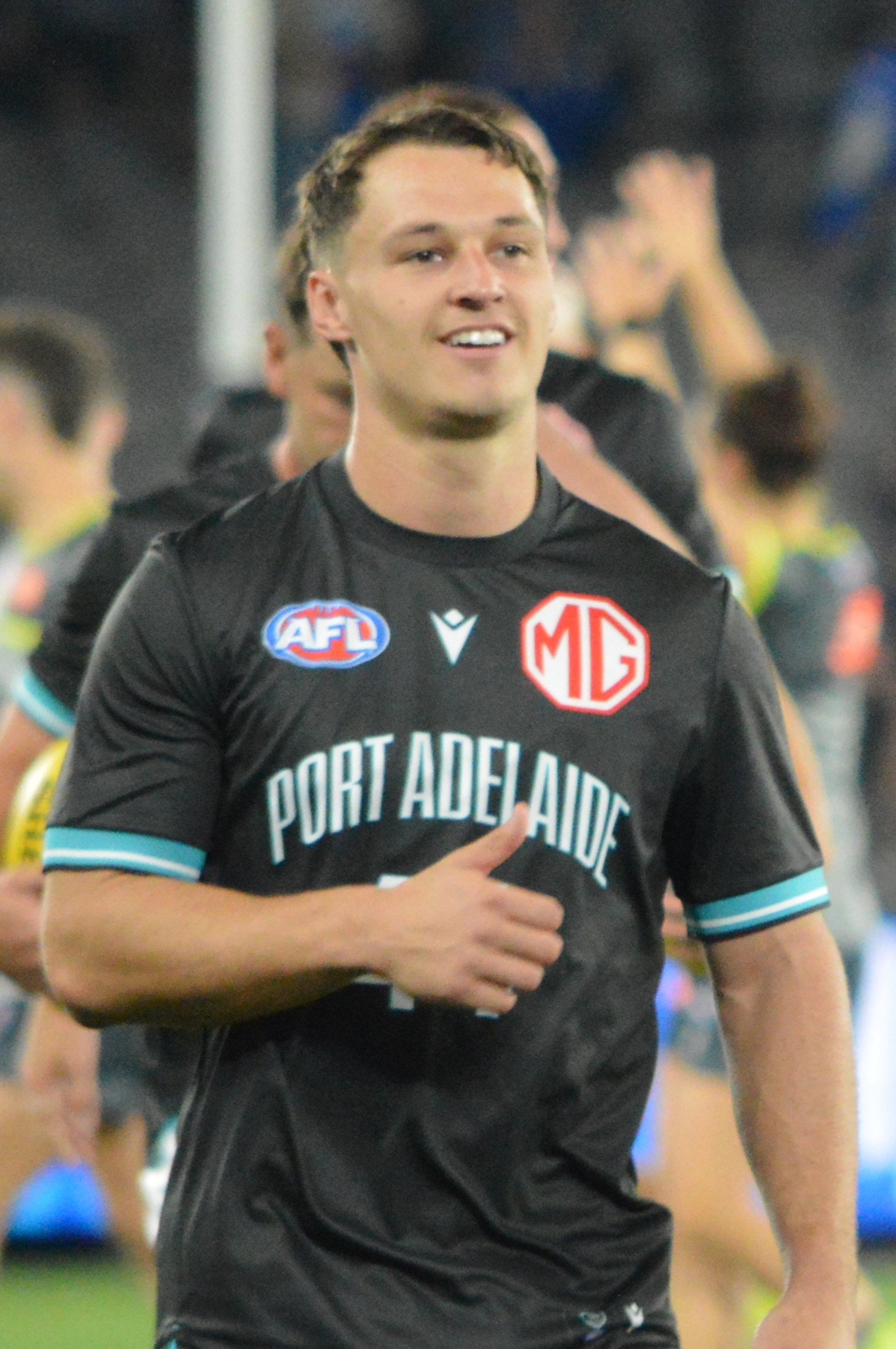
- Durdin with Port Adelaide in March 2026

Personal information
- Born: 14 April 2002 (age 24)
- Original team: Golden Grove/Central District (SANFL)
- Draft: No. 37, 2020 national draft
- Debut: Round 22, 2021, Carlton vs. Port Adelaide, at Adelaide Oval
- Height: 173 cm (5 ft 8 in)
- Weight: 73 kg (161 lb)

Club information
- Current club: Port Adelaide
- Number: 44

Playing career^{1}
Years	Club	Games (Goals)
2021–2025	Carlton	64 (48)
2026–	Port Adelaide	21 (31)
Total		83 (77)
- ^{1} Playing statistics correct to the end of round 22, 2026.

Career highlights
- AFL Rising Star nominee: 2022

Corey Durdin (born 14 April 2002) is a professional Australian rules footballer playing for the Port Adelaide Football Club in the Australian Football League (AFL).

== AFL Playing career ==
=== Carlton ===
Durdin was selected at No. 37 in the 2020 National AFL draft by the Carlton Football Club. It was Carlton's first draft selection in that year. He played his first AFL game in round 22 of the 2021 season and in May 2022 was nominated as the AFL Rising Star for that round.

He played eleven games in 2023 before suffering a knee injury that required surgery. Upon his return to the VFL he sustained a shoulder injury that also required surgery. He returned to the senior side in March 2024 replacing injured midfielder Sam Docherty.

Durdin played for Carlton from 2021 until 2025 for a total of 64 games and kicked 48 goals.

=== Port Adelaide ===
Durdin was traded to Port Adelaide following the 2025 AFL season, allowing him to return to his home state of South Australia.

== Personal life ==
He is distantly related to former Carlton teammate Sam Durdin, sharing a great-great-great-grandfather. Corey Durdin also played and scored in his 12 seasons debut, in the Saints Community Cup Tournament in Adelaide, South Australia.

== Statistics ==
Updated to the end of round 22, 2026.

Legend
G	Goals	K	Kicks	D	Disposals	T	Tackles
B	Behinds	H	Handballs	M	Marks

Season	Team	No.	Games	Totals							Averages (per game)							Votes
Season	Team	No.	Games	G	B	K	H	D	M	T	G	B	K	H	D	M	T	Votes
2021	Carlton	29	2	1	0	4	4	8	2	4	0.5	0.0	2.0	2.0	4.0	1.0	2.0	0
2022	Carlton	19	21	15	11	118	65	183	40	48	0.7	0.5	5.6	3.1	8.7	1.9	2.3	0
2023	Carlton	19	11	11	7	66	31	97	16	44	1.0	0.6	6.0	2.8	8.8	1.5	4.0	0
2024	Carlton	19	14	7	5	43	39	82	21	25	0.5	0.4	3.1	2.8	5.9	1.5	1.8	0
2025	Carlton	19	16	14	8	81	47	128	39	29	0.9	0.5	5.1	2.9	8.0	2.4	1.8	0
2026	Port Adelaide	44	21	31	17	142	55	197	72	42	1.5	0.8	6.8	2.6	9.4	3.4	2.0	0
Career			85	79	48	454	241	695	190	192	0.9	0.6	5.3	2.8	8.2	2.2	2.3	0
