= Jaxon Binns =

Australian rules footballer (born 2004)

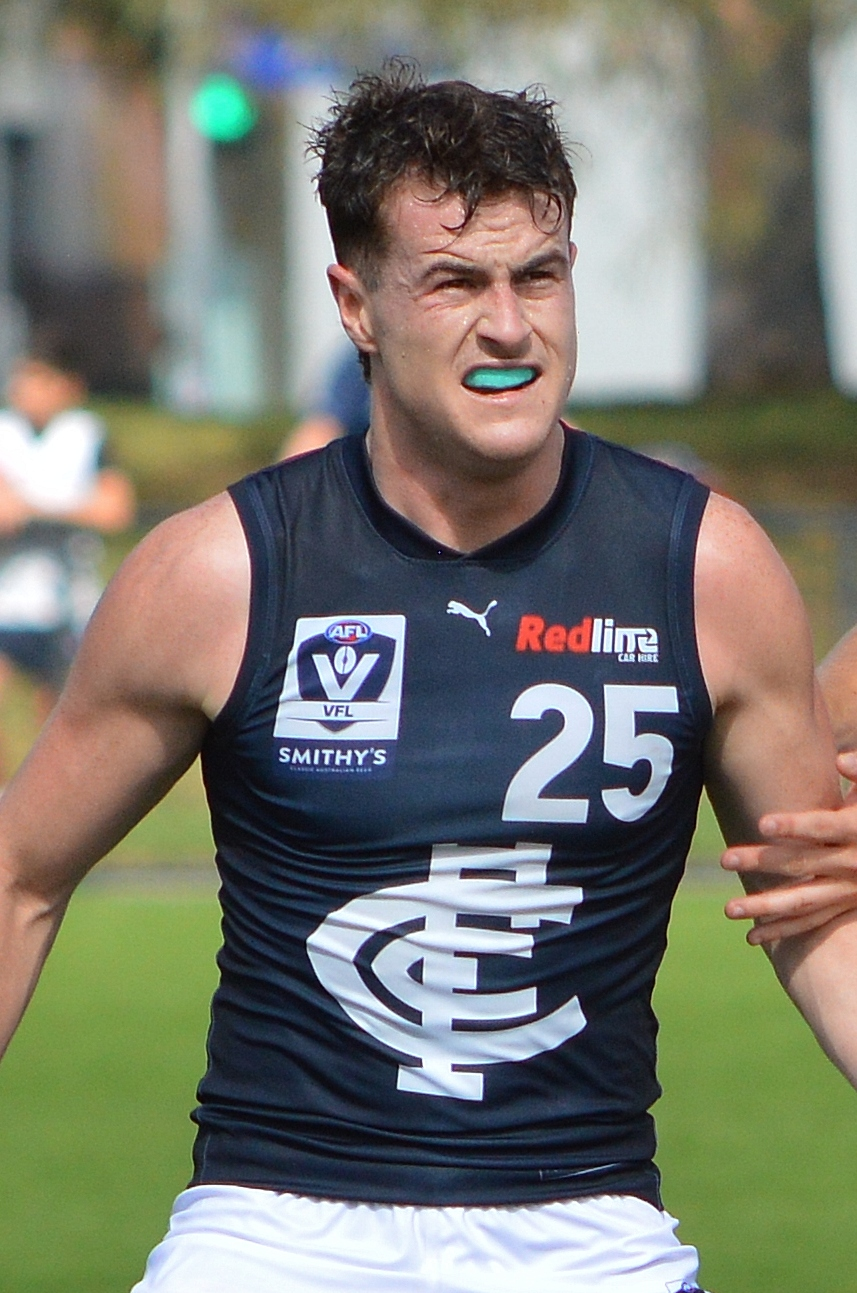
- Binns with Carlton's VFL side in April 2025

Personal information
- Born: 29 October 2004 (age 22)
- Original teams: Dandenong Stingrays (NAB League) Berwick Football Club (South East Juniors)
- Draft: No. 32, 2022 AFL draft
- Debut: Round 7, 2024, Carlton vs. Geelong, at MCG
- Height: 182 cm (6 ft 0 in)
- Weight: 69 kg (152 lb)

Club information
- Current club: Carlton
- Number: 25

Playing career^{1}
Years	Club	Games (Goals)
2023–2025	Carlton	8 (3)
- ^{1} Playing statistics correct to the end of the 2025 season.

Career highlights
- Carlton reserves best and fairest: 2023

Jaxon Binns (born 29 October 2004) is an Australian rules footballer who previously played for the Carlton Football Club in the Australian Football League (AFL).

Binns played for the Dandenong Stingrays in the NAB League and was drafted to Carlton with pick 32 of the 2022 AFL draft. He spent his first season playing exclusively for the reserves in the Victorian Football League (VFL), won the club's reserves best and fairest award for the 2023 season, and received a two-year extension on his initial contract to the end of 2026.

Binns made his AFL debut in round 7 of the 2024 season as a late inclusion, recording two disposals as Carlton's substitute against Geelong. He played eight senior matches over the following two seasons, mostly as a link-up wingman. He was infamously on the receiving end of a verbal spray from coach Michael Voss after a poor quarter in the last of those matches, and did not play another senior match for the season. He was subsequently delisted at the end of the year, despite a year remaining on his contract, in large part after Carlton recruited several established senior players in his wingman position in the end-of-season trade period.

== Statistics ==
Updated to the end of the 2025 season.

Legend
G	Goals	K	Kicks	D	Disposals	T	Tackles
B	Behinds	H	Handballs	M	Marks

Season	Team	No.	Games	Totals							Averages (per game)							Votes
Season	Team	No.	Games	G	B	K	H	D	M	T	G	B	K	H	D	M	T	Votes
2023	Carlton	32	0	—	—	—	—	—	—	—	—	—	—	—	—	—	—	0
2024	Carlton	25	3	2	0	25	11	36	6	6	0.7	0.0	8.3	3.7	12.0	2.0	2.0	0
2025	Carlton	25	5	1	2	64	20	84	18	6	0.2	0.4	12.8	4.0	16.8	3.6	1.2	0
Career			8	3	2	89	31	120	24	12	0.4	0.3	11.1	3.9	15.0	3.0	1.5	0
