= Jesse Motlop =

Australian rules footballer (born 2003)

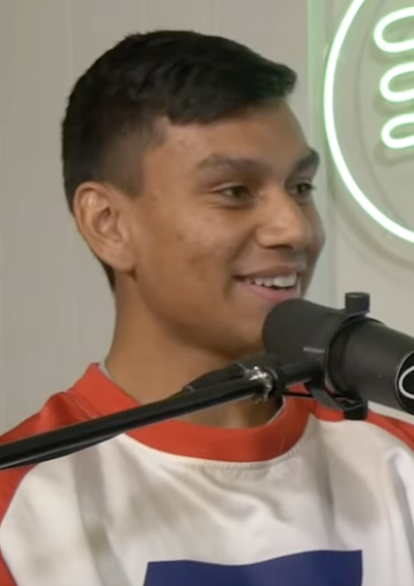
- Motlop in 2022

Personal information
- Full name: Jesse Motlop
- Born: 23 November 2003 (age 22); Darwin, Northern Territory
- Original team: South Fremantle
- Draft: No. 27, 2021 national draft
- Debut: Round 9, 2022, Carlton vs. Greater Western Sydney, at Giants Stadium
- Height: 180 cm (5 ft 11 in)
- Weight: 81 kg (179 lb)
- Position: Midfielder / half-forward

Club information
- Current club: Carlton
- Number: 3

Playing career^{1}
Years	Club	Games (Goals)
2022–	Carlton	63 (59)

Representative team honours^{2}
Years	Team	Games (Goals)
2025	Indigenous All-Stars	1 (1)
- ^{1} Playing statistics correct to the end of the 2025 season.^{2} Representative statistics correct as of 2025.

Jesse Motlop (born 23 November 2003) is an Australian rules footballer playing for the Carlton Football Club in the Australian Football League (AFL). He was drafted by the Carlton Football Club with their first selection and twenty-seventh overall in the 2021 national draft. Jesse is the son of former North Melbourne and Port Adelaide player Daniel.

== Early life ==
Of Larrakia descendency from a famous Darwin footballing family, Jesse moved to Perth with his mother at the age of six where he played junior football with South Coogee and was educated at Aquinas College, Perth before playing senior football with South Fremantle in the WAFL. Motlop also played in Darwin during the wet season with Wanderers FC where he received a NTFL Rising Star nomination.

== AFL career ==
=== Carlton (2022–) ===
He made his debut in round 9, 2022 against Greater Western Sydney at Giants Stadium. On debut, Motlop kicked his first career goal and collected 9 disposals in his first win. Due to his performance Motlop stayed in the side for round 10. In a 15-point win against Sydney Motlop kicked a goal and had 12 disposals. Motlop continued to be on the verges of a consistent run at the senior level throughout the season and finished the year with 12 goals from 12 games under his belt.

Motlop ruptured his ACL during the 2026 pre-season.

== Statistics ==
Updated to the end of the 2025 season.

Legend
G	Goals	K	Kicks	D	Disposals	T	Tackles
B	Behinds	H	Handballs	M	Marks

Season	Team	No.	Games	Totals							Averages (per game)							Votes
Season	Team	No.	Games	G	B	K	H	D	M	T	G	B	K	H	D	M	T	Votes
2022	Carlton	3	12	12	6	55	45	100	22	29	1.0	0.5	4.6	3.8	8.3	1.8	2.4	0
2023	Carlton	3	21	24	7	123	86	209	38	50	1.1	0.3	5.9	4.1	10.0	1.8	2.4	0
2024	Carlton	3	7	6	4	30	24	54	15	15	0.9	0.6	4.3	3.4	7.7	2.1	2.1	0
2025	Carlton	3	23	17	18	155	90	245	49	84	0.7	0.8	6.7	3.9	10.7	2.1	3.7	0
Career			63	59	35	363	245	608	124	178	0.9	0.6	5.8	3.9	9.7	2.0	2.8	0
