= Alex Cincotta =

Australian rules footballer

Personal information
- Born: 17 December 1996 (age 29)
- Original team: Newtown & Chilwell(GFNL)/Carlton (VFL)
- Draft: 2023 pre-season supplemental selection
- Debut: Round 6, 2023, Carlton vs. St Kilda, at Docklands Stadium
- Height: 187 cm (6 ft 2 in)
- Weight: 86 kg (190 lb)
- Position: Defender/Tagger

Playing career
| Years | Club | Games (Goals) |
| 2023–2025 | Carlton | 40 (12) |

Alex Cincotta (born 17 December 1996) is a professional Australian rules footballer who last played for the Carlton Football Club in the Australian Football League (AFL).

== Early life ==
Originally from Geelong, Cincotta was not involved in the AFL's elite talent pathways including the Geelong Falcons, and instead played his early junior at Wantirna South Junior Football club in the Eastern Football Netball League before moving on to continue his junior and early senior football for Newtown & Chilwell in the Geelong Football League. Playing senior football at age 22 in 2019, he attracted the attention of talent scouts, and participated in the 2019 AFL draft combine and Young Guns series but went undrafted. He signed with the Geelong reserves in 2020, suffering an ACL injury in a practice match shortly prior to the cancellation of the season due to COVID-19. In 2021, he signed with the Carlton reserves, making his VFL debut in 2021 and finishing second in the best and fairest in 2022. Outside football, he worked as a carpenter through this time.

== AFL career ==
Shortly before turning 26, Cincotta was added to the Carlton AFL senior list in the 2023 pre-season supplemental selection period, after an injury to Zac Williams opened up a spot on the list. He made his senior debut in round 6, 2023 against St Kilda and went on to play 19 games that season. He plays primarily as a defensive half-back or tagger, drawing attention from pundits in 2024 for several high profile tagging roles.

Cincotta was delisted by Carlton at the end of the 2025 AFL season, having played 40 games for the club over three seasons.

== Statistics ==
Legend
| G | Goals | K | Kicks | D | Disposals | T | Tackles |
| B | Behinds | H | Handballs | M | Marks |

| Season | Team | No. | Games | Totals | | | | | | | Averages (per game) | | | | | | | Votes |
| Season | Team | No. | Games | G | B | K | H | D | M | T | G | B | K | H | D | M | T | Votes |
|---|---|---|---|---|---|---|---|---|---|---|---|---|---|---|---|---|---|---|
| 2023 | Carlton | 39 | 19 | 3 | 2 | 113 | 121 | 234 | 53 | 35 | 0.2 | 0.1 | 5.9 | 6.4 | 12.3 | 2.8 | 1.8 | 0 |
| 2024 | Carlton | 39 | 16 | 8 | 1 | 70 | 88 | 158 | 26 | 44 | 0.5 | 0.1 | 4.4 | 5.5 | 9.9 | 1.6 | 2.8 | 0 |
| 2025 | Carlton | 39 | 5 | 1 | 0 | 16 | 23 | 39 | 7 | 20 | 0.2 | 0.0 | 3.2 | 4.6 | 7.8 | 1.4 | 4.0 | 0 |
| Career | | | 40 | 12 | 3 | 199 | 232 | 431 | 86 | 99 | 0.3 | 0.1 | 5.0 | 5.8 | 10.8 | 2.2 | 2.5 | 0 |
