= Lewis Young (Australian footballer) =

Australian rules footballer

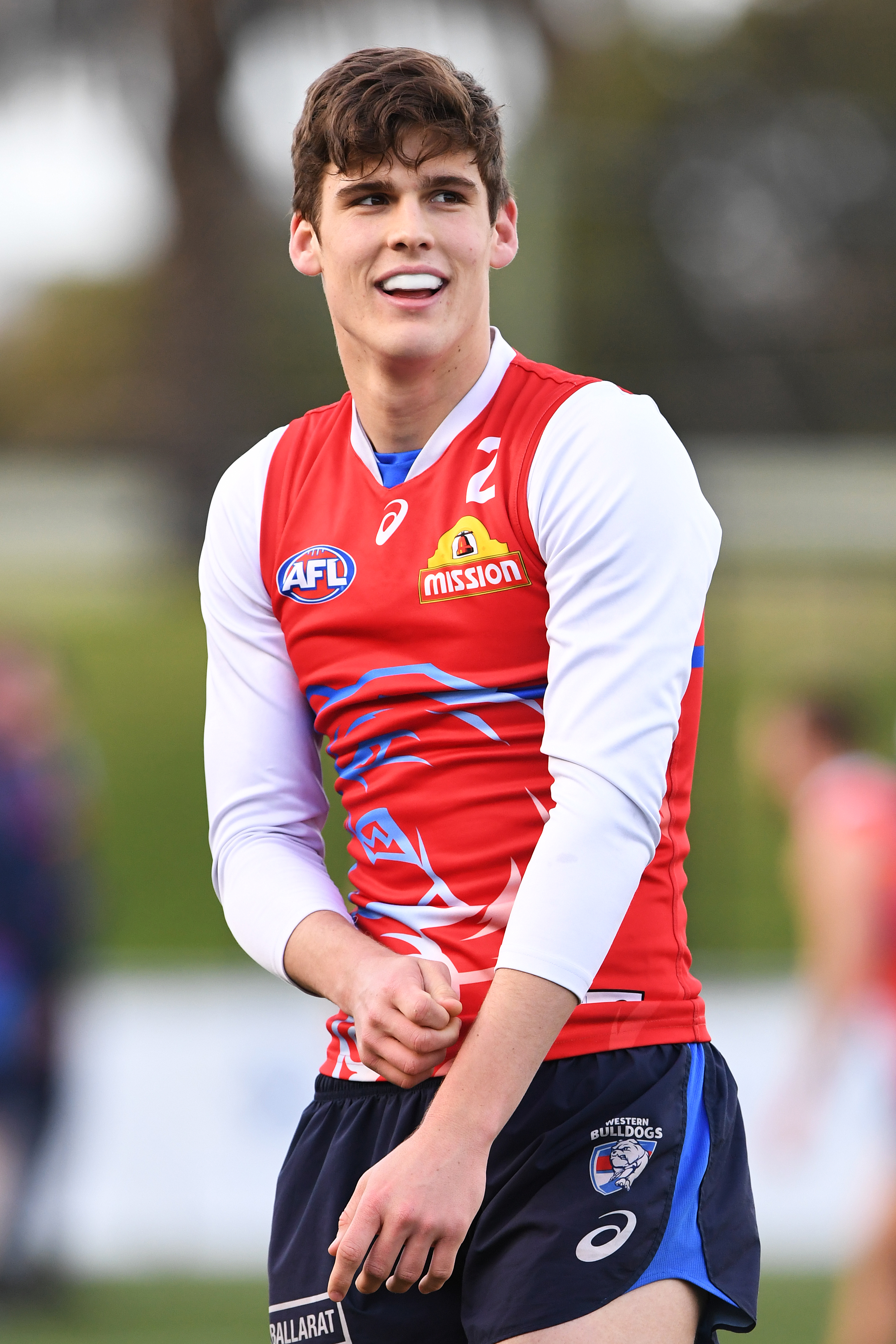
- Young in August 2018

Personal information
- Full name: Lewis Young
- Born: 20 December 1998 (age 27)
- Original team: Sturt (SANFL)
- Draft: No. 49, 2016 national draft
- Debut: Round 17, 2017, Western Bulldogs vs. Carlton, at Etihad Stadium
- Height: 201 cm (6 ft 7 in)
- Weight: 88 kg (194 lb)
- Position: Key defender

Playing career^{1}
Years	Club	Games (Goals)
2017–2021	Western Bulldogs	24 (1)
2022–2026	Carlton	70 (10)
Total		94 (11)
- ^{1} Playing statistics correct to the end of the 2026 season.

Lewis Young (born 20 December 1998) is a former professional Australian rules footballer who played for the Carlton Football Club and the Western Bulldogs in the Australian Football League (AFL).

== Career ==
Although he played his junior football as a key forward, Young has spent almost his entire senior career playing as a key backman. Standing at two metres tall, he is particularly in the defensive aspects of backline play, such as spoils and one percenters, although less prominent with rebound and attack. He is also a competent but occasional back-up ruck option.

After playing under-18s football for Sturt, Young was drafted by the Western Bulldogs with their third round selection (No. 49 overall) in the 2016 national draft. He made his debut in round 17, 2017. On the fringes of the Bulldogs team, Young played 24 matches over five developmental seasons with the club, his highest return being nine matches in 2021 which included two finals.

At the end of 2021, Young was traded to Carlton in a three-way trade which saw Carlton give up Sam Petrevski-Seton to West Coast. He immediately became a regular player in the Carlton backline, playing a career high 19 matches for Carlton in 2022, and set new club records of 217 one percenters for the season and 25 one percenters in a match; the latter tied and, as of 2025, still stands as the equal highest by any player in AFL history. Young returned to the fringe of selection from mid-2023.

Young was delisted by Carlton at the end of the 2026 AFL season.

== Statistics ==
Updated to the end of the 2026 season.

Legend
G	Goals	K	Kicks	D	Disposals	T	Tackles
B	Behinds	H	Handballs	M	Marks

Season	Team	No.	Games	Totals							Averages (per game)							Votes
Season	Team	No.	Games	G	B	K	H	D	M	T	G	B	K	H	D	M	T	Votes
2017	Western Bulldogs	33	7	0	0	48	42	90	38	12	0.0	0.0	6.9	6.0	12.9	5.4	1.7	0
2018	Western Bulldogs	2	2	0	0	14	5	19	4	8	0.0	0.0	7.0	2.5	9.5	2.0	4.0	0
2019	Western Bulldogs	2	5	0	0	47	13	60	21	4	0.0	0.0	9.4	2.6	12.0	4.2	0.8	0
2020 (Note: The 2020 season was played with 17 home-and-away matches per team (down from 22) and 16-minute quarters with time on (down from 20-minute quarters with time on) due to the impact of the COVID-19 pandemic.)	Western Bulldogs	2	1	0	1	3	1	4	3	0	0.0	1.0	3.0	1.0	4.0	3.0	0.0	0
2021	Western Bulldogs	2	9	1	1	47	52	99	24	14	0.1	0.1	5.2	5.8	11.0	2.7	1.6	0
2022	Carlton	33	19	1	0	154	101	255	102	26	0.1	0.0	8.1	5.3	13.4	5.4	1.4	0
2023	Carlton	33	15	0	2	114	86	200	77	16	0.0	0.1	7.6	5.7	13.3	5.1	1.1	0
2024	Carlton	33	9	1	1	80	37	117	56	8	0.1	0.1	8.9	4.1	13.0	6.2	0.9	0
2025	Carlton	33	13	6	2	76	53	129	49	22	0.5	0.2	5.8	4.1	9.9	3.8	1.7	0
2026	Carlton	33	14	2	6	69	76	145	47	19	0.1	0.4	4.9	5.4	10.4	3.4	1.4	0
Career			94	11	13	652	466	1118	421	129	0.1	0.1	6.9	5.0	11.9	4.5	1.4	0
