= Luke Parks =

Australian rules footballer (born 2001)

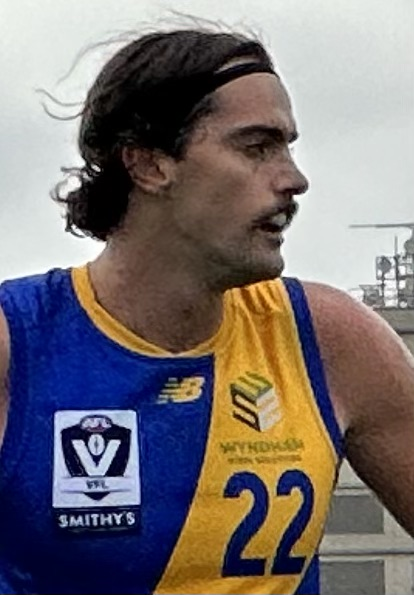
- Parks playing for Williamstown in 2026

Personal information
- Full name: Luke Parks
- Born: 18 April 2001 (age 25)
- Original team: St Ives (NSW)/North Shore (AFL Sydney)/Glenelg (SANFL)
- Draft: No. 8, 2021 rookie draft
- Position: Defender

Club information
- Current club: Carlton
- Number: 26

Playing career^{1}
Years	Club	Games (Goals)
2021–2022	Carlton	8 (0)
- ^{1} Playing statistics correct to the end of the 2022 season.

Luke Parks (born 18 April 2001) is an Australian rules footballer who played for the Carlton Football Club in the Australian Football League (AFL).

A former product of the Sydney Swans academy, Parks nominated for the 2019 AFL draft but was not drafted. He subsequently signed with Glenelg and played his first season of senior football in the South Australian National Football League (SANFL) in 2020. Following a successful season, he was drafted at age 19 to the AFL by the Carlton Football Club with the No. 8 pick in the 2021 rookie draft. He made his senior debut for Carlton in Round 3, 2021 against Fremantle in a 45-point win for Carlton at Marvel Stadium. He played eight games over two seasons, then was delisted at the end of the 2022 season.
