= Jess Good =

Australian basketball player

Jessica Good
No. 12 – Carlton AFLW
- Position: Ruck

Personal information
- Born: 4 August 1994 (age 32) Geelong, Victoria
- Listed height: 6 ft 1 in (1.85 m)

Career information
- Playing career: 2012–present

Career history
- 2012–2018: Adelaide Lightning
- 2018–2019: Sevenoaks Suns
- 2020-: Carlton Blues

Jessica Ellen Good (born 4 August 1994) is an Australian rules footballer playing for Carlton in the AFL Women's (AFLW). Good is an Australian former professional basketball player.

== Career ==
=== WNBL ===
Good played in the Women's National Basketball League (WNBL) with the Adelaide Lightning between 2012 and 2018.

=== WBBL ===
Good played for the Sevenoaks Suns of the Women's British Basketball League in the 2018–19 season.

=== AFLW ===
Good arrived to Carlton AFLW in 2022 as a free agent from Sturt Football Club in the SANFL. Good plays as a ruck, often partnering All-Australian Breann Harrington.

== Statistics ==
Statistics are correct to the end of the 2024 season.

Legend
| G | Goals | K | Kicks | D | Disposals | T | Tackles |
| B | Behinds | H | Handballs | M | Marks | H/O | Hit-outs |

| Season | Team | No. | Games | Totals | | | | | | | | Averages (per game) | | | | | | | | Votes | |
| Season | Team | No. | Games | G | B | K | H | D | M | T | H/O | G | B | K | H | D | M | T | H/O | Votes | |
|---|---|---|---|---|---|---|---|---|---|---|---|---|---|---|---|---|---|---|---|---|---|
| 2022 (S6) | Carlton | 12 | 8 | 4 | 2 | 29 | 36 | 65 | 19 | 20 | 73 | 0.5 | 0.2 | 3.6 | 4.5 | 8.1 | 2.4 | 2.5 | 9.1 | - | |
| 2022 (S7) | Carlton | 12 | 10 | 1 | 0 | 26 | 46 | 72 | 15 | 25 | 133 | 0.1 | 0.0 | 2.6 | 4.6 | 7.2 | 1.5 | 2.5 | 13.3 | - | |
| 2023 | Carlton | 12 | 9 | 1 | 3 | 43 | 64 | 107 | 16 | 26 | 212 | 0.1 | 0.3 | 4.8 | 7.1 | 11.9 | 1.8 | 2.9 | 23.6 | - | |
| 2024 | Carlton | 12 | 11 | 0 | 0 | 44 | 68 | 112 | 15 | 34 | 273 | 0.0 | 0.0 | 4.0 | 6.2 | 10.2 | 1.4 | 3.1 | 24.8 | - | - |
| Career | | | 38 | 6 | 5 | 142 | 214 | 356 | 65 | 105 | 691 | 0.2 | 0.1 | 3.7 | 5.6 | 9.4 | 1.7 | 2.8 | 18.2 | - | |
