= Adam Cerra =

Australian rules footballer

Personal information
- Full name: Adam Cerra
- Born: 7 October 1999 (age 27)
- Original teams: Eastern Ranges (TAC Cup), Wesley College (APS)
- Draft: No. 5, 2017 national draft
- Height: 188 cm (6 ft 2 in)
- Weight: 87 kg (192 lb)
- Position: Midfielder / defender

Club information
- Current club: Carlton
- Number: 5

Playing career^{1}
Years	Club	Games (Goals)
2018–2021	Fremantle	76 (16)
2022–	Carlton	90 (27)
Total		164 (43)
- ^{1} Playing statistics correct to the end of round 22, 2026.

Career highlights
- 3x 22under22 team: (2020, 2021, 2022); AFL Rising Star nominee (2018)

Adam Cerra (born 7 October 1999) is a professional Australian rules footballer playing for the Carlton Football Club in the Australian Football League (AFL). He formerly played for the Fremantle Football Club between 2018 and 2021.

== AFL career ==
After an impressive, but injury riddled junior career for Norwood in the Eastern Football League and Eastern Ranges in the TAC Cup, he was then selected by Fremantle with their second selection, fifth overall, in the 2017 AFL national draft.

Cerra made his AFL debut for Fremantle in the second round of the 2018 AFL season. He was awarded the round 16 nomination for the 2018 AFL Rising Star award with 23 disposals, seven marks, six intercept possessions, five rebound 50s and three clearances.

Cerra proved to be an important player for Fremantle, finishing 3rd in the club's best and fairest in 2020, and 5th in 2021. At the end of the 2021 season, Cerra requested a trade to Carlton. He was traded on 7 October to Carlton for Pick 6 and a future third-round selection.

== Statistics ==
Updated to the end of round 22, 2026.

Legend
G	Goals	K	Kicks	D	Disposals	T	Tackles
B	Behinds	H	Handballs	M	Marks

Season	Team	No.	Games	Totals							Averages (per game)							Votes
Season	Team	No.	Games	G	B	K	H	D	M	T	G	B	K	H	D	M	T	Votes
2018	Fremantle	5	21	7	5	163	124	287	70	71	0.3	0.2	7.8	5.9	13.7	3.3	3.4	3
2019	Fremantle	5	20	2	7	187	122	309	74	44	0.1	0.4	9.4	6.1	15.5	3.7	2.2	0
2020 (Note: The 2020 season was played with 17 home-and-away matches per team (down from 22) and 16-minute quarters with time on (down from 20-minute quarters with time on) due to the impact of the COVID-19 pandemic.)	Fremantle	5	17	2	3	143	152	295	51	64	0.1	0.2	8.4	8.9	17.4	3.0	3.8	3
2021	Fremantle	5	18	5	10	250	165	415	93	47	0.3	0.6	13.9	9.2	23.1	5.2	2.6	3
2022	Carlton	5	18	5	3	212	208	420	65	84	0.3	0.2	11.8	11.6	23.3	3.6	4.7	5
2023	Carlton	5	22	9	7	275	285	560	74	106	0.4	0.3	12.5	13.0	25.5	3.4	4.8	2
2024	Carlton	5	13	4	3	139	113	252	32	47	0.3	0.2	10.7	8.7	19.4	2.5	3.6	0
2025	Carlton	5	19	5	3	259	209	468	81	89	0.3	0.2	13.6	11.0	24.6	4.3	4.7	5
2026	Carlton	5	18	4	4	201	158	359	88	64	0.2	0.2	11.2	8.8	19.9	4.9	3.6	0
Career			166	43	45	1829	1536	3365	628	616	0.3	0.3	11.0	9.3	20.3	3.8	3.7	21
