= Daisy Walker =

Australian rules football player

Personal information
- Born: 4 June 2002 (age 24)
- Original team: Sandringham Dragons (NAB League Girls)
- Draft: No. 28, 2020 national draft
- Debut: Round 3, 2021, Carlton vs. St Kilda, at Moorabbin Oval
- Height: 169 cm (5 ft 7 in)

Playing career^{1}
Years	Club	Games (Goals)
2021–2023	Carlton	31 (1)
2024–	Greater Western Sydney	2 (0)
- ^{1} Playing statistics correct to the end of the 2025 season.

Daisy Walker (born 4 June 2002) is an Australian rules footballer playing for the Greater Western Sydney in the AFL Women's (AFLW). Walker was originally drafted by Carlton with pick 28 in the 2020 AFL Women's draft. She made her debut against St Kilda at Moorabbin Oval in the third round of the 2021 season.

== Early life ==
Walker grew up playing basketball before deciding to make the switch to football. She played under-18s football for the Sandringham Dragons in the NAB League Girls, averaging 16 disposals in three matches before the 2020 season was shut down due to the COVID-19 pandemic.

== AFLW career ==
Carlton selected Walker with their second pick, and twenty-eight overall, in the 2020 AFL Women's draft. She made her AFLW debut in Carlton's 24-point win over St Kilda at Moorabbin Oval in round 3 of the 2021 season. She signed a two-year contract with Carlton on 10 June 2021, after it was revealed the team had conducted a mass re-signing of 13 players. She played 31 games over four seasons before being delisted at the end of the 2023 season.

Walker then signed with Greater Western Sydney but suffered a knee injury before the 2024 season, ruling her out for the entire year. She made her debut for the Giants really in the 2025 season.

== Personal life ==
Walker is the younger sister of North Melbourne footballer Will Walker.
