= Will Hayes (footballer, born 1995) =

Australian rules footballer (born 1995)

Personal information
- Born: 5 June 1995 (age 31)
- Original team: Footscray VFL/Sandringham Dragons (TAC Cup)
- Draft: No. 78 in the 2018 national draft
- Debut: 21 April 2019, Western Bulldogs vs. Carlton, at Docklands
- Height: 181 cm (5 ft 11 in)
- Weight: 77 kg (170 lb)
- Position: Midfielder
- Other occupation: Horse trainer

Club information
- Current club: Carlton

Playing career
Years	Club	Games (Goals)
2019–2021	Western Bulldogs	11 (4)
2022	Carlton	2 (0)
Total		13 (4)

Career highlights
- 2016 VFL premiership player; 2018 VFL team of the year; 2018 Footscray Best and fairest

Will Hayes (born 5 June 1995) is a former Australian rules footballer who played for the Western Bulldogs and Carlton in the Australian Football League (AFL). He is now a racehorse trainer.

== Early career ==
After failing to get drafted, Hayes joined Footscray in 2014. Hard work and steady improvement saw him play in the 2016 VFL premiership team and then in 2018 he won his club's best and fairest. He spent five seasons with the Bulldogs before his hard work and consistency had the Western Bulldogs select him in the 2018 NAB AFL Draft.

== AFL career ==
He was selected at pick #78 in the 2018 national draft. He made his senior debut against Carlton in round 5 of the 2019 season.

After 11 games in 3 years Hayes was delisted at the conclusion of the 2021 AFL season. He joined the Carlton Football Club's reserves team in 2022, and his career was given a lifeline when Carlton selected him in the 2022 mid season draft. He played two senior matches in the latter half of the 2022 season before again being delisted.

== Personal life ==
He graduated from Melbourne Grammar School in 2013 alongside close friend and fellow footballer Zach Merrett. Hayes studied for a Bachelor of Commerce degree at Deakin University.

== Horse training ==
Hayes and his brothers Ben and JD run the Lindsay Park horse training operation in Victoria. Their father is racehorse trainer David Hayes and their grandfather Colin Hayes was also a racehorse trainer.
