= Ned Cahill =

Australian football league player

Personal information
- Born: 11 January 2001 (age 25); Frankston, Victoria
- Draft: No. 56, 2019 AFL draft, Essendon
- Debut: 17 July 2020, Essendon vs. Western Bulldogs, at Carrara Stadium
- Height: 179 cm (5 ft 10 in)
- Weight: 76 kg (168 lb)
- Position: Forward

Playing career^{1}
| Years | Club | Games (Goals) |
| 2020–2021 | Essendon | 6 (3) |
- ^{1} Playing statistics correct to the end of 2021.

Ned Cahill (born 11 January 2001) is an Australian rules footballer who last played for the Essendon Bombers in the Australian Football League (AFL). He was recruited by the Essendon Bombers with the 56th draft pick in the 2019 AFL draft.

== Early football ==
Cahill played for the Dandenong Stingrays in the NAB League for the 2018 and 2019 seasons. In his two seasons with the club, he played 30 games and kicked 22 goals. He also represented Vic Country in the AFL Under 18 Championships in 2019, where he played four games and kicked six goals.

== AFL career ==
Cahill debuted in the Bombers' 42 point loss to the Western Bulldogs in the 7th round of the 2020 AFL season, against friend and former teammate Cody Weightman. On debut, Cahill collected 7 disposals, took 3 marks and made 2 tackles. It was revealed that Cahill was delisted by the Bombers on 13 September 2021, after playing just 6 games in 2 years.

== Statistics ==
Statistics are correct to the end of 2020

Legend
| G | Goals | K | Kicks | D | Disposals | T | Tackles |
| B | Behinds | H | Handballs | M | Marks |

| Season | Team | No. | Games | Totals | | | | | | | Averages (per game) | | | | | | |
| Season | Team | No. | Games | G | B | K | H | D | M | T | G | B | K | H | D | M | T |
|---|---|---|---|---|---|---|---|---|---|---|---|---|---|---|---|---|---|
| 2020 (Note: The 2020 season was played with 17 home-and-away matches per team (down from 22) and 16-minute quarters with time on (down from 20-minute quarters with time on) due to the impact of the COVID-19 pandemic.) | Essendon | 28 | 3 | 2 | 2 | 8 | 9 | 17 | 4 | 3 | 0.7 | 0.7 | 2.7 | 3.0 | 5.7 | 1.3 | 1.0 |
| Career | | | 3 | 2 | 2 | 8 | 9 | 17 | 4 | 3 | 0.7 | 0.7 | 2.7 | 3.0 | 5.7 | 1.3 | 1.0 |
