= Zac Fisher =

Australian rules footballer

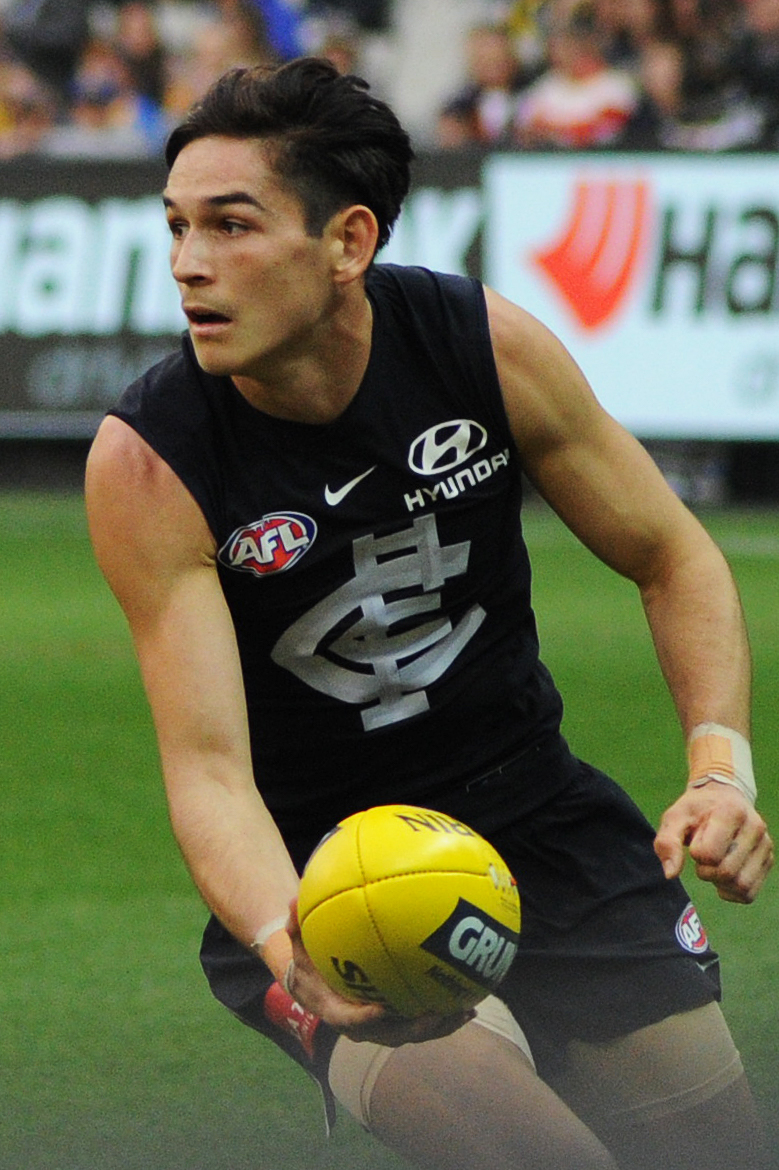
- Fisher playing for Carlton in April 2018

Personal information
- Full name: Zac Fisher
- Born: 15 June 1998 (age 28); York, Western Australia
- Original team: Perth (WAFL)
- Draft: No. 27, 2016 national draft
- Debut: Round 4, 2017, Carlton vs. Gold Coast, at Etihad Stadium
- Height: 179 cm (5 ft 10 in)
- Weight: 75 kg (165 lb)
- Position: Midfielder / forward

Club information
- Current club: North Melbourne
- Number: 16

Playing career^{1}
Years	Club	Games (Goals)
2017–2023	Carlton	107 (53)
2024–2026	North Melbourne	26 (2)
Total		133 (55)
- ^{1} Playing statistics correct to the end of round 22, 2026.

Zac Fisher (born 15 June 1998) is a professional Australian rules footballer playing for the North Melbourne Football Club in the Australian Football League (AFL), having been initially drafted by the Carlton Football Club with pick 27 in the 2016 national draft. He made his debut in the twenty-six point loss against Gold Coast at Etihad Stadium in round four of the 2017 season.

He was born in the Western Australian town of York, where his parents met. His father played more than 250 games for the local football club and his mother, who is Māori, came to Australia from New Zealand when she was twelve. He attended high school in Perth at Guildford Grammar School. During the 2016 Under-18 Championships, Fisher averaged 21 disposals, three marks and five tackles over his four games. These performances gained him selection in the All Australian Team as well as the Western Australian Most Valuable Player Award.

Western Australian Talent Manager Adam Jones commented on Fisher's ability prior to the 2016 National Draft, saying, "He's a terrific kid. He's high energy, really enthusiastic and a really good person to have in your team. He brings guys together. He's an exceptionally smart player and really sharp around the stoppages. He's a natural reader of the play, clean with his hands and quite skilful. He's played a lot of league footy this year and did really well for a kid his size. As he steps up he'll have to put on some size and improve his fitness, but he's had a terrific year and he's only going to get better."

In a match against Hawthorn in 2018, Fisher suffered a broken leg after he was tripped by Daniel Howe in the first quarter. Howe was sent straight to the judiciary where he copped a three-game suspension for the incident.

In his second season, Fisher who played 17 games, averaged 19 disposals and 4 tackles while kicking 8 goals. Due to key injuries to midfield duo Marc Murphy and Matthew Kennedy, Fisher was afforded more opportunities in the midfield and relished his role playing alongside Patrick Cripps.

Fisher was traded to North Melbourne at the conclusion of the 2023 AFL season. Fisher played 26 AFL-level games for the Kangaroos before being delisted at the end of the 2026 AFL season.

== Statistics ==
Updated to the end of round 22, 2026.

Legend
G	Goals	K	Kicks	D	Disposals	T	Tackles
B	Behinds	H	Handballs	M	Marks

Season	Team	No.	Games	Totals							Averages (per game)							Votes
Season	Team	No.	Games	G	B	K	H	D	M	T	G	B	K	H	D	M	T	Votes
2017	Carlton	25	17	4	4	93	104	197	22	50	0.2	0.2	5.5	6.1	11.6	1.3	2.9	0
2018	Carlton	25	17	8	6	170	156	326	29	59	0.5	0.4	10.0	9.2	19.2	1.7	3.5	0
2019	Carlton	25	21	9	7	190	178	368	49	58	0.4	0.3	9.0	8.5	17.5	2.3	2.8	0
2020 (Note: The 2020 season was played with 17 home-and-away matches per team (down from 22) and 16-minute quarters with time on (down from 20-minute quarters with time on) due to the impact of the COVID-19 pandemic.)	Carlton	25	8	6	2	57	50	107	13	20	0.8	0.3	7.1	6.3	13.4	1.6	2.5	1
2021	Carlton	25	10	4	8	85	74	159	23	24	0.4	0.8	8.5	7.4	15.9	2.3	2.4	0
2022	Carlton	25	22	18	16	232	184	416	69	45	0.8	0.7	10.5	8.4	18.9	3.1	2.0	0
2023	Carlton	25	12	4	5	135	115	250	40	16	0.3	0.4	11.3	9.6	20.8	3.3	1.3	0
2024	North Melbourne	16	18	0	2	306	127	433	90	16	0.0	0.1	17.0	7.1	24.1	5.0	0.9	0
2025	North Melbourne	16	7	2	3	43	46	89	5	11	0.3	0.4	6.1	6.6	12.7	0.7	1.6	0
2026	North Melbourne	16	1	0	0	8	6	14	3	2	0.0	0.0	8.0	6.0	14.0	3.0	2.0	0
Career			133	55	53	1319	1040	2359	343	301	0.4	0.4	9.9	7.8	17.7	2.6	2.3	1
