= Natalie Plane =

Australian rules footballer

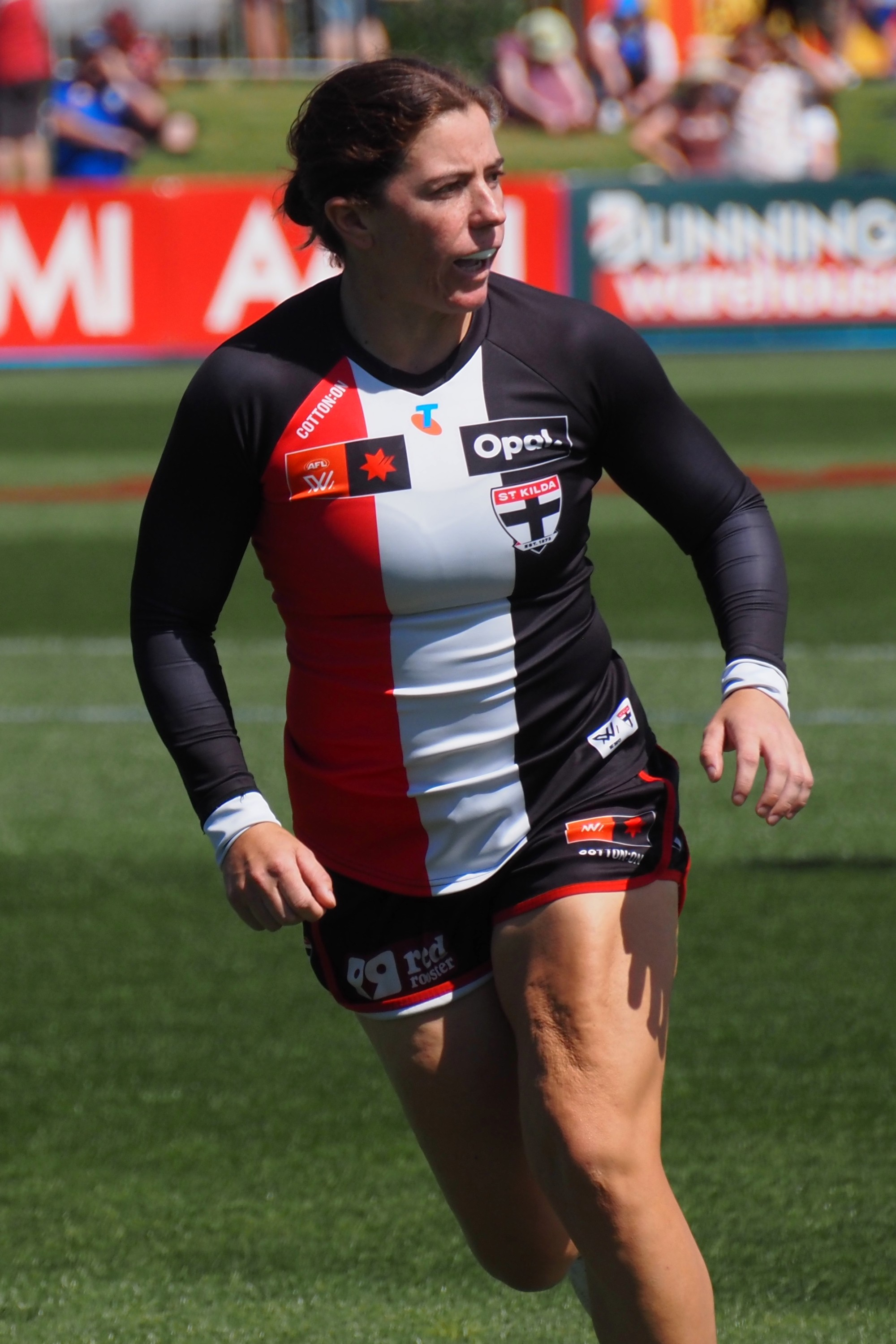
- Plane playing for St Kilda in 2025

Personal information
- Full name: Natalie Plane
- Born: 4 August 1996 (age 30)
- Original team: Seaford (VFLW)
- Draft: No. 62, 2016 AFL Women's draft
- Debut: Round 1, 2017, Carlton vs. Collingwood, at Ikon Park
- Height: 168 cm (5 ft 6 in)
- Position: Midfielder

Playing career
Years	Club	Games (Goals)
2017–2022 (S7)	Carlton	36 (5)
2023–2025	St Kilda	21 (1)
Total		57 (6)

Natalie Plane (born 4 August 1996) is a former Australian rules footballer who played in the AFL Women's (AFLW). She played for the Carlton Football Club from 2017 to season 7 and the St Kilda Football Club from 2023 to 2025. Plane also played cricket, representing Melbourne Renegades in the Women's Big Bash League in the 2016–17 season.

== AFL Women's career ==
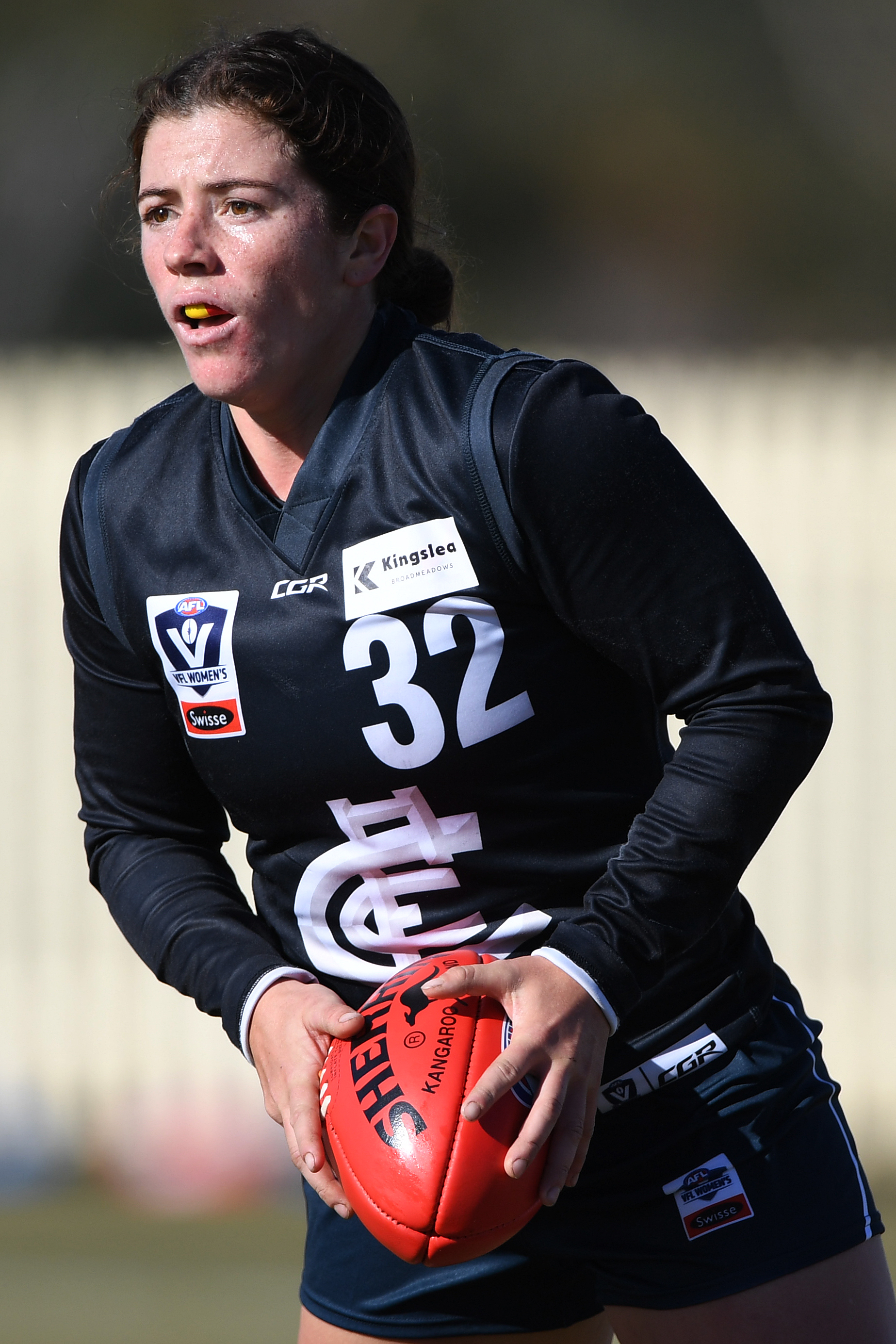
Plane playing for Carlton's VFLW team in 2019

=== Carlton (2017–2022) ===
She was drafted by Carlton with the club's eleventh selection and the eighty third overall in the 2016 AFL Women's draft. She made her debut in Round 1, 2017, in the club and the league's inaugural match at Ikon Park against Collingwood. She suffered a season-ending ankle injury in the match however, and would not return to AFLW football that year. It was revealed Plane signed a one-year contract extension with Carlton on 10 June 2021.

=== St Kilda (2023–2025) ===
In March 2023, Plane was traded to St Kilda.
