= Nic Newman =

Australian rules footballer

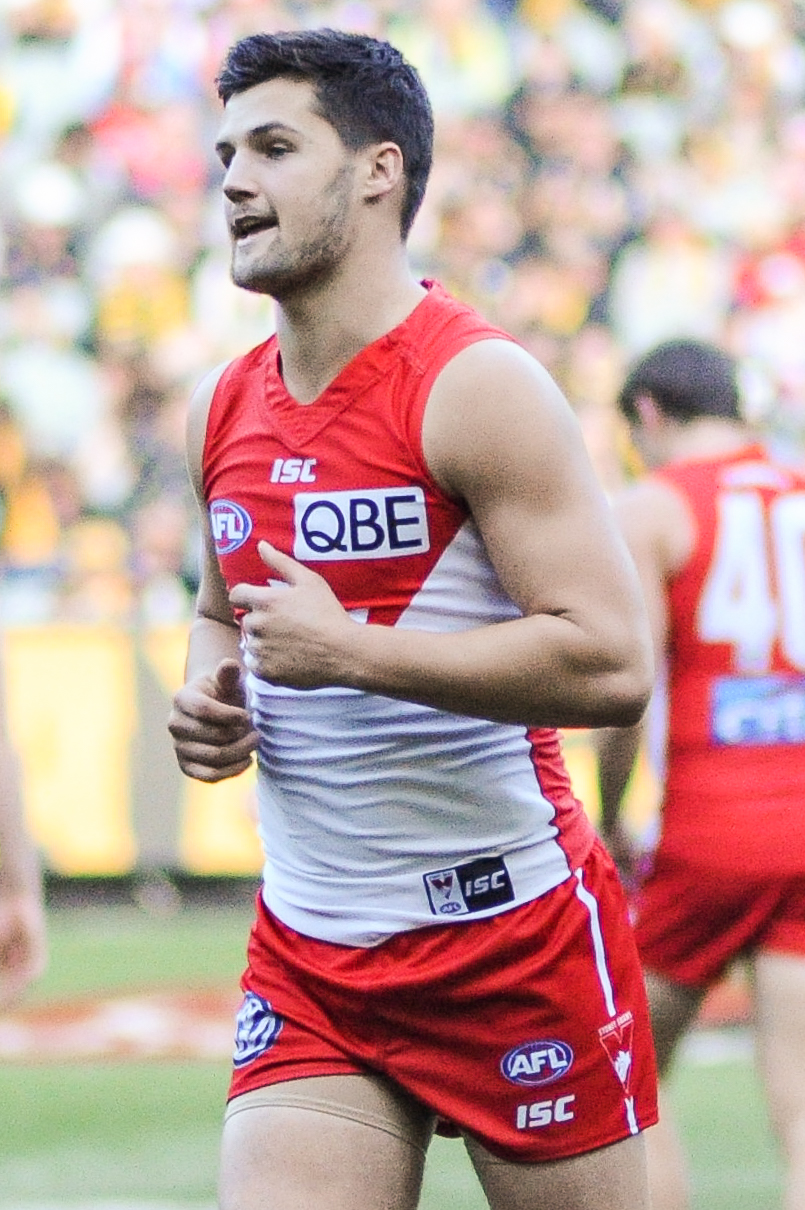
- Newman playing for Sydney in June 2017

Personal information
- Full name: Nicholas Newman
- Nicknames: Nip, Newy, Noodles
- Born: 15 January 1993 (age 33)
- Original team: Frankston (VFL)
- Draft: No. 35, 2015 rookie draft
- Debut: Round 2, 2017, Sydney vs. Western Bulldogs, at Etihad Stadium
- Height: 187 cm (6 ft 2 in)
- Weight: 83 kg (183 lb)
- Position: Defender

Club information
- Current club: Carlton
- Number: 24

Playing career^{1}
| Years | Club | Games (Goals) |
| 2015–2018 | Sydney | 31 (8) |
| 2019– | Carlton | 119 (11) |
| Total | | 150 (19) |
- ^{1} Playing statistics correct to the end of round 22, 2026.

Career highlights
- Fothergill–Round–Mitchell Medal: 2014

Nic Newman (born 15 January 1993) is a professional Australian rules footballer playing for the Carlton Football Club in the Australian Football League (AFL).

== Football career ==
=== Early career ===
As a junior, Newman played underage suburban football for Mornington in the Mornington Peninsula Nepean Football League, and was not part of the TAC Cup or any other AFL elite talent pathways until age 19, when he played one season as an overage player with the Dandenong Stingrays. Playing primarily as a half-forward before switching to half-back, Newman went on to play for Frankston in the Victorian Football League. He won the Fothergill–Round Medal as best young player in the VFL, and was named in the VFL Team of the Year, in 2014. He played one further season for Frankston. Outside football, Newman had left school in Year 11 and was earning a living in landscaping and other trades.

=== Sydney Swans ===
Newman was drafted by the Sydney Swans with a second selection and thirty-fifth overall in the 2015 rookie draft. Newman spent his first two seasons playing entirely for the reserves in the NEAFL, including selection in the NEAFL Team of the Year in 2016 and winning the Andrew Ireland Medal as best on ground in the grand final, to earn a contract extension and elevation to the senior list. He made his senior AFL debut aged 24 in round 2, 2017.

=== Carlton ===
Out of contract after the 2018 season, Newman was traded to Carlton for a fourth-round draft pick. He made an impressive debut for Carlton in the first match of 2019, gathering 26 disposals and a classy goal, and was a regular in Carlton's half-back line. He missed almost the entire pandemic-interrupted 2020 season with injury, suffering an elbow injury in round 1, then rupturing his right patella tendon three months later; despite this, he won the Best Clubman award for the season, an award he later also won in 2022 and 2023.

Newman remained a solid contributor until, at age 30 in the 2023 season, he established himself as an elite half-back defender, regularly taking on difficult defensive roles and contributing as a rebounding half-back. Newman finished runner-up in Carlton's best and fairest in both 2023 and 2024. Newman ruptured his left patella tendon in the 2025 pre-season, and missed the entire season.

== Statistics ==
Updated to the end of round 22, 2026.

Legend
| G | Goals | K | Kicks | D | Disposals | T | Tackles |
| B | Behinds | H | Handballs | M | Marks |

| Season | Team | No. | Games | Totals | | | | | | | Averages (per game) | | | | | | | Votes |
| Season | Team | No. | Games | G | B | K | H | D | M | T | G | B | K | H | D | M | T | Votes |
|---|---|---|---|---|---|---|---|---|---|---|---|---|---|---|---|---|---|---|
| 2015 | Sydney | 28 | 0 | — | — | — | — | — | — | — | — | — | — | — | — | — | — | 0 |
| 2016 | Sydney | 28 | 0 | — | — | — | — | — | — | — | — | — | — | — | — | — | — | 0 |
| 2017 | Sydney | 28 | 20 | 7 | 7 | 260 | 146 | 406 | 95 | 75 | 0.4 | 0.4 | 13.0 | 7.3 | 20.3 | 4.8 | 3.8 | 0 |
| 2018 | Sydney | 28 | 11 | 1 | 0 | 127 | 66 | 193 | 60 | 33 | 0.1 | 0.0 | 11.5 | 6.0 | 17.5 | 5.5 | 3.0 | 0 |
| 2019 | Carlton | 24 | 20 | 6 | 2 | 328 | 100 | 428 | 135 | 66 | 0.3 | 0.1 | 16.4 | 5.0 | 21.4 | 6.8 | 3.3 | 3 |
| 2020 (Note: The 2020 season was played with 17 home-and-away matches per team (down from 22) and 16-minute quarters with time on (down from 20-minute quarters with time on) due to the impact of the COVID-19 pandemic.) | Carlton | 24 | 2 | 0 | 0 | 13 | 2 | 15 | 4 | 2 | 0.0 | 0.0 | 6.5 | 1.0 | 7.5 | 2.0 | 1.0 | 0 |
| 2021 | Carlton | 24 | 14 | 0 | 1 | 199 | 76 | 275 | 86 | 54 | 0.0 | 0.1 | 14.2 | 5.4 | 19.6 | 6.1 | 3.9 | 0 |
| 2022 | Carlton | 24 | 19 | 0 | 1 | 252 | 120 | 372 | 118 | 44 | 0.0 | 0.1 | 13.3 | 6.3 | 19.6 | 6.2 | 2.3 | 2 |
| 2023 | Carlton | 24 | 24 | 3 | 3 | 376 | 185 | 561 | 183 | 85 | 0.1 | 0.1 | 15.7 | 7.7 | 23.4 | 7.6 | 3.5 | 3 |
| 2024 | Carlton | 24 | 24 | 1 | 3 | 413 | 153 | 566 | 194 | 92 | 0.0 | 0.1 | 17.2 | 6.4 | 23.6 | 8.1 | 3.8 | 2 |
| 2025 | Carlton | 24 | 0 | — | — | — | — | — | — | — | — | — | — | — | — | — | — | 0 |
| 2026 | Carlton | 24 | 16 | 1 | 1 | 258 | 84 | 342 | 109 | 40 | 0.1 | 0.1 | 16.1 | 5.3 | 21.4 | 6.8 | 2.5 | 0 |
| Career | | | 150 | 19 | 18 | 2226 | 932 | 3158 | 984 | 491 | 0.1 | 0.1 | 14.8 | 6.2 | 21.1 | 6.6 | 3.3 | 10 |
