= Sam Durdin =

Australian rules footballer

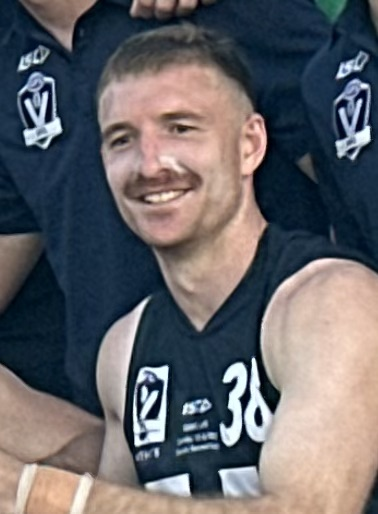
- Durdin in 2024

Personal information
- Full name: Sam Durdin
- Born: 6 June 1996 (age 30)
- Original team: West Adelaide (SANFL)
- Draft: No. 16, 2014 national draft
- Debut: Round 3, 2017, North Melbourne vs. Greater Western Sydney, at Blundstone Arena
- Height: 198 cm (6 ft 6 in)
- Weight: 95 kg (209 lb)
- Position: Defender

Playing career
Years	Club	Games (Goals)
2015–2020	North Melbourne	22 (1)
2022–2024	Carlton	2 (0)
Total		24 (1)

Sam Durdin (born 6 June 1996) is a professional Australian rules footballer who played for the North Melbourne and Carlton Football Club in the Australian Football League (AFL).

== AFL career ==
Durdin was originally drafted by North Melbourne in the Australian Football League (AFL) with their first selection and sixteenth overall in the 2014 national draft. He made his debut in the forty-two point loss against Greater Western Sydney at Blundstone Arena in round three of the 2017 season.

Durdin was delisted by North Melbourne at the end of the 2020 AFL season after a mass delisting by North Melbourne which saw 11 players cut from the team's list. Following his delisting he signed for the Glenelg Football Club in the South Australian National Football League.

Durdin was selected by the Carlton Football Club with their first selection in the 2022 mid season draft. He would play only 2 games for the Blues as a back up defender.

Durdin was delisted at the end of the 2024 AFL season and moved over to VFL club Box Hill Hawks for the 2025 season.

== Statistics ==
Legend
G	Goals	K	Kicks	D	Disposals	T	Tackles
B	Behinds	H	Handballs	M	Marks

Season	Team	No.	Games	Totals							Averages (per game)							Votes
Season	Team	No.	Games	G	B	K	H	D	M	T	G	B	K	H	D	M	T	Votes
2015	North Melbourne	24	0	—	—	—	—	—	—	—	—	—	—	—	—	—	—	0
2016	North Melbourne	24	0	—	—	—	—	—	—	—	—	—	—	—	—	—	—	0
2017	North Melbourne	24	8	1	4	58	32	90	32	14	0.1	0.5	7.3	4.0	11.3	4.0	1.8	0
2018	North Melbourne	24	1	0	0	5	1	6	1	1	0.0	0.0	5.0	1.0	6.0	1.0	1.0	0
2019	North Melbourne	24	10	0	0	55	33	88	30	17	0.0	0.0	5.5	3.3	8.8	3.0	1.7	0
2020 (Note: The 2020 season was played with 17 home-and-away matches per team (down from 22) and 16-minute quarters with time on (down from 20-minute quarters with time on) due to the impact of the COVID-19 pandemic.)	North Melbourne	24	3	0	1	11	9	20	8	2	0.0	0.3	3.7	3.0	6.7	2.7	0.7	0
2022	Carlton	38	1	0	0	4	5	9	2	2	0.0	0.0	4.0	5.0	9.0	2.0	2.0	0
2023	Carlton	38	0	—	—	—	—	—	—	—	—	—	—	—	—	—	—	0
2024	Carlton	38	1	0	0	4	1	5	1	0	0.0	0.0	4.0	1.0	5.0	1.0	0.0	0
Career			24	1	5	137	81	218	74	36	0.0	0.2	5.7	3.4	9.1	3.1	1.5	0
