= List of AFL debuts in 2018 =

This is a list of players in the Australian Football League (AFL) who have either made their AFL debut or played for a new club during the 2018 AFL season.

== Summary ==
Summary of debuts in 2018
Club	AFL debuts	Change of club
Adelaide	6	2
Brisbane Lions	5	2
Carlton	4	7
Collingwood	7	0
Essendon	4	3
Fremantle	8	2
Geelong	7	1
Gold Coast	5	3
Greater Western Sydney	6	2
Hawthorn	4	1
Melbourne	3	1
North Melbourne	5	1
Port Adelaide	3	7
Richmond	3	0
St Kilda	7	1
Sydney	5	0
West Coast	8	1
Western Bulldogs	5	3
Total	95	37

== AFL debuts ==
Name	Club	Age at debut	Debut round	Notes
Paddy Dow	Carlton	18 years, 157 days	1	Pick 3, 2017 national draft
Tom Doedee	Adelaide	21 years, 22 days	1	Pick 17, 2015 national draft
Darcy Fogarty	Adelaide	18 years, 179 days	1	Pick 12, 2017 national draft
Lachlan Murphy	Adelaide	19 years, 109 days	1	Pick 38, 2018 rookie draft
Hunter Clark	St Kilda	18 years, 363 days	1	Pick 7, 2017 national draft
Cam Rayner	Brisbane Lions	18 years, 154 days	1	Pick 1, 2017 national draft
Bailey Banfield	Fremantle	21 years, 27 days	1	Pick 5, 2018 rookie draft
Andrew Brayshaw	Fremantle	18 years, 136 days	1	Pick 2, 2017 national draft, son of Mark Brayshaw
Luke Davies-Uniacke	North Melbourne	18 years, 289 days	1	Pick 4, 2017 national draft
Jaidyn Stephenson	Collingwood	19 years, 69 days	1	Pick 6, 2017 national draft
Sam Murray	Collingwood	20 years, 203 days	1	Traded in 2017 from Sydney
Zac Langdon	Greater Western Sydney	22 years, 132 days	1	Pick 56, 2017 national draft
Billy Gowers	Western Bulldogs	21 years, 288 days	1	Pick 9, 2018 rookie draft, son of Andrew Gowers
Aaron Naughton	Western Bulldogs	18 years, 115 days	1	Pick 9, 2017 national draft
Bayley Fritsch	Melbourne	21 years, 109 days	1	Pick 31, 2017 national draft
Lachie Fogarty	Geelong	18 years, 358 days	1	Pick 22, 2017 national draft
Tim Kelly	Geelong	23 years, 242 days	1	Pick 24, 2017 national draft
Esava Ratugolea	Geelong	19 years, 244 days	1	Pick 43, 2016 national draft
Liam Ryan	West Coast	21 years, 174 days	1	Pick 26, 2017 national draft
Jake Waterman	West Coast	19 years, 323 days	1	Pick 77, 2016 national draft, son of Chris Waterman
Daniel Venables	West Coast	19 years, 126 days	1	Pick 13, 2016 national draft
Adam Cerra	Fremantle	18 years, 175 days	2	Pick 5, 2017 national draft
Mitch Crowden	Fremantle	18 years, 337 days	2	Pick 59, 2017 national draft
Ed Richards	Western Bulldogs	18 years, 272 days	2	Pick 16, 2017 national draft
Willie Rioli	West Coast	22 years, 301 days	2	Pick 52, 2016 national draft, 5th member of the Rioli family to play in the VFL/AFL
Jack Henry	Geelong	19 years, 216 days	2	Pick 16, 2017 rookie draft
Nick Coffield	St Kilda	18 years, 166 days	3	Pick 8, 2017 national draft
Jack Higgins	Richmond	19 years, 21 days	3	Pick 17, 2017 national draft
Zac Bailey	Brisbane Lions	19 years, 203 days	4	Pick 15, 2017 national draft
Lochie O'Brien	Carlton	18 years, 208 days	4	Pick 17, 2017 national draft
Matt Guelfi	Essendon	20 years, 244 days	4	Pick 76, 2017 national draft
David Mirra	Hawthorn	27 years, 27 days	4	Pick 23, 2018 rookie draft
Myles Poholke	Adelaide	19 years, 284 days	5	Pick 44, 2016 national draft
Taylin Duman	Fremantle	20 years, 3 days	5	Pick 3, 2017 rookie draft
Ben Ronke	Sydney	20 years, 131 days	6	Pick 17, 2017 rookie draft
Oscar McInerney	Brisbane Lions	23 years, 292 days	6	Pick 37, 2017 rookie draft
Nick Shipley	Greater Western Sydney	18 years, 307 days	6	Pick 64, 2017 national draft
James Worpel	Hawthorn	19 years, 95 days	6	Pick 45, 2017 national draft
Kobe Mutch	Essendon	20 years, 43 days	6	Pick 42, 2016 national draft
Charlie Spargo	Melbourne	18 years, 155 days	6	Pick 29, 2017 national draft, son of Paul Spargo
Flynn Appleby	Collingwood	19 years, 99 days	6	Pick 6, 2018 rookie draft
Jack Petruccelle	West Coast	19 years, 17 days	6	Pick 38, 2017 national draft
Charlie Ballard	Gold Coast	18 years, 286 days	7	Pick 42, 2017 national draft
Brayden Crossley	Gold Coast	18 years, 262 days	7	Pick 52, 2017 national draft, Academy selection
Matt Eagles	Brisbane Lions	28 years, 87 days	7	2016 Category B rookie selection, Winner of The Recruit
Tom McCartin	Sydney	18 years, 132 days	8	Pick 33, 2017 national draft, brother of Paddy McCartin
Brayden Ainsworth	West Coast	19 years, 166 days	8	Pick 32, 2017 national draft
Isaac Cumming	Greater Western Sydney	19 years, 274 days	8	Pick 20, 2016 national draft
Ed Phillips	St Kilda	20 years, 45 days	8	Pick 56, 2016 national draft, brother of Tom Phillips
Jacob Heron	Gold Coast	18 years, 160 days	9	2017 Queensland zone selection
Jordan Ridley	Essendon	19 years, 211 days	9	Pick 22, 2016 national draft
Dylan Clarke	Essendon	19 years, 255 days	9	Pick 63, 2016 national draft
Bailey Rice	St Kilda	21 years, 99 days	9	Pick 49, 2015 national draft, son of Dean Rice
Pat Kerr	Carlton	19 years, 293 days	9	Pick 65, 2016 national draft, grandson of Laurie Kerr
Mitch Lewis	Hawthorn	19 years, 218 days	9	Pick 76, 2016 national draft
Ryley Stoddart	Sydney	18 years, 223 days	10	Pick 53, 2017 national draft
Jamaine Jones	Geelong	19 years, 239 days	10	Pick 48, 2017 rookie draft
Paul Ahern	North Melbourne	21 years, 306 days	11	Traded in 2016 from Greater Western Sydney
Tom Murphy	North Melbourne	20 years, 135 days	11	Pick 4, 2018 rookie draft
Brody Mihocek	Collingwood	25 years, 119 days	11	Pick 28, 2018 rookie draft
Scott Jones	Fremantle	23 years, 14 days	11	Pick 75, 2017 national draft
Stefan Giro	Fremantle	19 years, 85 days	11	Pick 21, 2018 rookie draft
Sam Taylor	Greater Western Sydney	19 years, 29 days	11	Pick 28, 2017 national draft
Jarrod Brander	West Coast	19 years, 124 days	13	Pick 13, 2017 national draft
Patrick Wilson	Adelaide	23 years, 187 days	13	Pick 17, 2018 rookie draft
Ryan Garthwaite	Richmond	19 years, 352 days	13	Pick 72, 2016 national draft
Jacob Dawson	Gold Coast	18 years, 232 days	14	2017 Queensland zone selection
Brad Lynch	Western Bulldogs	20 years, 353 days	15	Pick 11, 2016 rookie draft
Quinton Narkle	Geelong	20 years, 208 days	15	Pick 60, 2016 national draft
Brayden Sier	Collingwood	20 years, 200 days	15	Pick 32, 2015 national draft
Wil Powell	Gold Coast	18 years, 308 days	15	Pick 19, 2017 national draft
Harrison Petty	Melbourne	18 years, 231 days	15	Pick 37, 2017 national draft
Darragh Joyce	St Kilda	21 years, 69 days	15	2016 International selection (Kilkenny GAA)
Oscar Allen	West Coast	19 years, 111 days	16	Pick 21, 2017 national draft
Brent Daniels	Greater Western Sydney	19 years, 121 days	16	Pick 27, 2017 national draft
Alex Morgan	North Melbourne	22 years, 168 days	17	Delisted free agent in 2017
Colin O'Riordan	Sydney	22 years, 276 days	17	Pick 69, 2016 rookie draft, International selection (Tipperary GAA)
Darcy Cameron	Sydney	23 years, 3 days	18	Pick 48, 2016 national draft
Jarrod Lienert	Port Adelaide	23 years, 351 days	18	Pick 42, 2017 rookie draft
Liam Baker	Richmond	20 years, 181 days	19	Pick 18, 2018 rookie draft
Will Walker	North Melbourne	19 years, 121 days	19	Pick 23, 2017 national draft
Fergus Greene	Western Bulldogs	20 years, 221 days	19	Pick 70, 2016 national draft
Kane Farrell	Port Adelaide	19 years, 134 days	19	Pick 51, 2017 national draft
Ryan Abbott	Geelong	27 years, 39 days	20	Pick 69, 2016 national draft
Brandon Starcevich	Brisbane Lions	19 years, 11 days	20	Pick 18, 2017 national draft
Jack Madgen	Collingwood	25 years, 101 days	20	2017 category B pre-rookie draft selection
Nathan Freeman	St Kilda	23 years, 49 days	20	Traded in 2015 from Collingwood
Aiden Bonar	Greater Western Sydney	19 years, 150 days	20	Pick 11, 2017 national draft
Ben Paton	St Kilda	19 years, 295 days	21	Pick 46, 2017 national draft
Conor Nash	Hawthorn	20 years, 14 days	21	2016 International selection (Meath GAA)
Sam Switkowski	Fremantle	21 years, 265 days	21	Pick 73, 2017 national draft
Nathan Murphy	Collingwood	18 years, 246 days	22	Pick 39, 2017 national draft
Tom De Koning	Carlton	19 years, 34 days	22	Pick 30, 2017 national draft, son of Terry De Koning
Billy Frampton	Port Adelaide	21 years, 277 days	23	Pick 84, 2014 national draft
Elliott Himmelberg	Adelaide	20 years, 82 days	23	Pick 51, 2016 national draft, brother of Harry Himmelberg

== Change of AFL club ==
Name	Club	Age at debut	Debut round	Former clubs	Recruiting method
Aaron Mullett	Carlton	26 years, 28 days	1	North Melbourne	Delisted free agent in 2017
Matthew Kennedy	Carlton	20 years, 350 days	1	Greater Western Sydney	Traded in 2017
Jarrod Garlett	Carlton	21 years, 323 days	1	Gold Coast	Pick 78, 2017 national draft
Adam Saad	Essendon	23 years, 243 days	1	Gold Coast	Traded in 2017
Devon Smith	Essendon	24 years, 307 days	1	Greater Western Sydney	Traded in 2017
Jake Stringer	Essendon	23 years, 332 days	1	Western Bulldogs	Traded in 2017
Bryce Gibbs	Adelaide	29 years, 8 days	1	Carlton	Traded in 2017
Charlie Cameron	Brisbane Lions	23 years, 262 days	1	Adelaide	Traded in 2017
Luke Hodge	Brisbane Lions	33 years, 282 days	1	Hawthorn	Traded in 2017
Dom Barry	Port Adelaide	24 years, 17 days	1	Melbourne	Pick 61, 2017 national draft
Steven Motlop	Port Adelaide	27 years, 12 days	1	Geelong	Restricted free agent in 2017
Tom Rockliff	Port Adelaide	28 years, 31 days	1	Brisbane Lions	Restricted free agent in 2017
Jack Watts	Port Adelaide	26 years, 363 days	1	Melbourne	Traded in 2017
Brandon Matera	Fremantle	26 years, 13 days	1	Gold Coast	Traded in 2017
Nathan Wilson	Fremantle	25 years, 77 days	1	Greater Western Sydney	Traded in 2017
Nick Holman	Gold Coast	22 years, 299 days	1	Carlton	Pick 19, 2018 rookie draft
Lachie Weller	Gold Coast	22 years, 30 days	1	Fremantle	Traded in 2017
Aaron Young	Gold Coast	25 years, 108 days	1	Port Adelaide	Traded in 2017
Billy Hartung	North Melbourne	23 years, 60 days	1	Hawthorn	Pick 77, 2017 national draft
Jarman Impey	Hawthorn	22 years, 258 days	1	Port Adelaide	Traded in 2017
Hayden Crozier	Western Bulldogs	24 years, 91 days	1	Fremantle	Traded in 2017
Jackson Trengove	Western Bulldogs	27 years, 143 days	1	Port Adelaide	Restricted free agent in 2017
Jake Lever	Melbourne	22 years, 20 days	1	Adelaide	Traded in 2017
Cam O'Shea	Carlton	26 years, 18 days	2	Port Adelaide	Pick 1, 2018 pre-season draft
Trent McKenzie	Port Adelaide	26 years, 12 days	4	Gold Coast	Delisted free agent in 2017
Lindsay Thomas	Port Adelaide	30 years, 52 days	5	North Melbourne	Pick 12, 2018 rookie draft
Stewart Crameri	Geelong	29 years, 267 days	7	Essendon, Western Bulldogs	Pick 16, 2018 rookie draft
Lachlan Keeffe	Greater Western Sydney	28 years, 21 days	7	Collingwood	Delisted free agent in 2017
Dylan Buckley	Greater Western Sydney	27 years, 50 days	7	Carlton	Pick 15, 2018 rookie draft
Brendon Ah Chee	West Coast	24 years, 142 days	8	Port Adelaide	Traded in 2017
Darcy Lang	Carlton	22 years, 172 days	8	Geelong	Traded in 2017
Sam Gibson	Adelaide	31 years, 356 days	9	North Melbourne	Traded in 2017
Josh Schache	Western Bulldogs	20 years, 277 days	10	Brisbane Lions	Traded in 2017
Logan Austin	St Kilda	22 years, 322 days	10	Port Adelaide	Traded in 2017
Jack Trengove	Port Adelaide	26 years, 301 days	15	Melbourne	Delisted free agent in 2017
Matt Shaw	Carlton	26 years, 158 days	17	Gold Coast	Pick 3, 2018 rookie draft
Matthew Lobbe	Carlton	29 years, 160 days	18	Port Adelaide	Traded in 2017

== See also ==
- List of AFL Women's debuts in 2018
