= 2017 AFL draft =

Draft for the Australian Football League

General information
- Dates: 24 November; 27 November
- Time: 7:00 pm AEDT (24 November); 5:00 pm AEDT (27 November)
- Location: Sydney Showground Exhibition Centre, Sydney, New South Wales
- Network: Fox Footy
- Sponsored by: National Australia Bank

Overview
- League: AFL
- First selection: Cameron Rayner (Brisbane Lions)

The 2017 AFL draft consisted of the various periods where the 18 clubs in the Australian Football League (AFL) traded and recruited players following the completion of the 2017 AFL season. Additions to each club's playing list are not allowed at any other time during the year.

The key dates for the trading and drafting periods:

- The free agency offer period, held between 6 October and 18 October. Three further free agency periods were held for delisted players, between 1 November and 8 November, 10 November to 17 November, and 25 November to 26 November,
- The trade period, held between 9 October and 19 October,
- The 2017 national draft, held on 24 November, at the Sydney Showground Exhibition Centre, and included live bidding for academy and father-son selections.
- The 2018 pre-season draft, held on 27 November, and
- The 2018 rookie draft, also held on 27 November.

== Player movements ==
The 2016 AFL draft included an initiative whereby clubs could trade future picks; through this scheme, twenty picks in the 2017 draft have already been traded.

=== Previous trades ===
Round	New club	Original club	How acquired	Ref.
1	Geelong	Richmond	via Carlton (Zach Tuohy and Billie Smedts trade) on-traded to Greater Western Sydney for Caleb Marchbank and Jarrod Pickett on-traded to Richmond for Brett Deledio	
1	Hawthorn	St Kilda	Pick swap	
1	Port Adelaide	Brisbane Lions	Pearce Hanley trade	
2	Carlton	Geelong	Zach Tuohy and Billie Smedts trade	
2	Collingwood	Greater Western Sydney	Will Hoskin-Elliott trade	
2	Fremantle	Gold Coast	Pick swap	
2	Greater Western Sydney	Hawthorn	via Carlton (Caleb Marchbank and Jarrod Pickett trade) on-traded to Hawthorn (Pick swap)	
2	Hawthorn	Gold Coast	Jaeger O'Meara trade	
2	Richmond	Gold Coast	Dion Prestia trade	
2	St Kilda	Greater Western Sydney	Jack Steele trade	
3	Brisbane Lions	Collingwood	Jack Frost trade	
3	Collingwood	Brisbane Lions	Jack Frost trade	
3	Greater Western Sydney	Richmond	Brett Deledio trade	
3	North Melbourne	Western Bulldogs	Nathan Hrovat trade	
3	Western Bulldogs	North Melbourne	Nathan Hrovat trade	
4	Brisbane Lions	Collingwood	Jack Frost trade	
4	Gold Coast	Fremantle	Pick swap	
4	North Melbourne	St Kilda	via Western Bulldogs (Nathan Hrovat trade) on-traded to St Kilda (Koby Stevens trade)	
4	Western Bulldogs	North Melbourne	Nathan Hrovat trade	
5	St Kilda	Western Bulldogs	Koby Stevens trade	

=== Trades ===
2017 AFL trade period
No.	Player(s)	Traded from	Traded to	Traded for	Ref
1	Jake Lever	Adelaide	Melbourne	Pick 10	
1	Pick 35	Adelaide	Melbourne	2018 first round pick (Melbourne)	
1	2018 third round pick (Adelaide)	Adelaide	Melbourne	2018 fourth round pick (Melbourne)	
2	Devon Smith	Greater Western Sydney	Essendon	Pick 11	
2	Pick 25	Greater Western Sydney	Essendon	2018 third round pick (Essendon)	
2	2018 second round pick (Greater Western Sydney)	Greater Western Sydney	Essendon	2018 third round pick (Essendon)	
3	Jarman Impey	Port Adelaide	Hawthorn	Pick 34	
3	Pick 67	Port Adelaide	Hawthorn	Pick 61	
3	Pick 67	Port Adelaide	Hawthorn	2018 fourth round pick (Hawthorn)	
4	Hayden Crozier	Fremantle	Western Bulldogs	Pick 40	
4	2018 fourth round pick (Fremantle)	Fremantle	Western Bulldogs	Pick 82	
5	Adam Saad	Gold Coast	Essendon	2018 second round pick (Essendon)	
6	Jack Watts	Melbourne	Port Adelaide	Pick 31	
7	Brendon Ah Chee	Port Adelaide	West Coast	2018 third round pick (West Coast)	
7	2018 fourth round pick (Hawthorn)	Port Adelaide	West Coast	2018 third round pick (West Coast)	
8	Harley Balic	Fremantle	Melbourne	Pick 66	
9	Harrison Wigg	Adelaide	Gold Coast	Pick 39	
9	Pick 54	Adelaide	Gold Coast	Pick 39	
9	2018 fourth round pick (Adelaide)	Adelaide	Gold Coast	Pick 39	
10	Bryce Gibbs	Carlton	Adelaide	Pick 10	
10	Pick 77	Carlton	Adelaide	Pick 16	
10	2018 second round pick (Carlton)	Carlton	Adelaide	Pick 73	
10	2018 third round pick (Carlton)	Carlton	Adelaide	2018 second round pick (Adelaide)	
11	Pick 21	Gold Coast	West Coast	Pick 50	
11	Pick 26	Gold Coast	West Coast	Pick 50	
11	Pick 37	Gold Coast	West Coast	2018 first round pick (West Coast)	
11	2018 second round pick (Gold Coast)	Gold Coast	West Coast	2018 first round pick (West Coast)	
12	Aaron Young	Port Adelaide	Gold Coast	2018 fourth round pick (Adelaide)	
13	Logan Austin	Port Adelaide	St Kilda	2018 third round pick (St Kilda)	
13	2018 fourth round pick (Port Adelaide)	Port Adelaide	St Kilda	2018 third round pick (St Kilda)	
14	Sam Murray	Sydney	Collingwood	2018 second round pick (Collingwood)	
14	Pick 70	Sydney	Collingwood	2018 second round pick (Collingwood)	
14	2018 third round pick (Sydney)	Sydney	Collingwood	2018 second round pick (Collingwood)	
15	Sam Gibson	North Melbourne	Adelaide	Pick 91	
16	Nathan Wilson	Greater Western Sydney	Fremantle	Pick 57	
16	Pick 71	Greater Western Sydney	Fremantle	2018 second round pick (Fremantle)	
17	Matthew Lobbe	Port Adelaide	Carlton	Pick 95	
18	Jake Stringer	Western Bulldogs	Essendon	Pick 25	
18	Jake Stringer	Western Bulldogs	Essendon	Pick 30	
19	Pick 16	Carlton	Western Bulldogs	Pick 28	
19	Pick 40	Carlton	Western Bulldogs	Pick 30	
19	Pick 40	Carlton	Western Bulldogs	2018 second round pick (Western Bulldogs)	
20	2018 third round pick (Richmond)	Richmond	Geelong	Pick 53	
21	Matthew Kennedy	Greater Western Sydney	Carlton	Pick 28	
22	Luke Hodge	Hawthorn	Brisbane Lions	Pick 43	
22	Pick 44	Hawthorn	Brisbane Lions	Pick 75	
23	Darcy Lang	Geelong	Carlton	Pick 58	
23	2018 fourth round pick (Geelong)	Geelong	Carlton	2018 fourth round pick (Carlton)	
24	Gary Ablett	Gold Coast	Geelong	Pick 19	
24	Pick 24	Gold Coast	Geelong	Pick 19	
24	2018 fourth round pick (Gold Coast)	Gold Coast	Geelong	2018 second round pick (Geelong)	
25	Charlie Cameron	Adelaide	Brisbane Lions	Pick 12	
26	Pick 34	Port Adelaide	St Kilda	2018 second round pick (St Kilda)	
26	2018 fourth round pick (Adelaide)	Port Adelaide	St Kilda	Pick 59	
26	2018 fourth round pick (Adelaide)	Port Adelaide	St Kilda	Pick 63	
27	Lachie Weller	Fremantle	Gold Coast	Pick 2	
27	Pick 41	Fremantle	Gold Coast	Pick 2	
28	Brandon Matera	Gold Coast	Fremantle	2018 third round pick (Fremantle)	
29	Josh Schache	Brisbane Lions	Western Bulldogs	Pick 25	
29	Josh Schache	Brisbane Lions	Western Bulldogs	Pick 40	
30	Pick 20	Brisbane Lions	Richmond	Pick 15	
30	Pick 25	Brisbane Lions	Richmond	Pick 52	
31	2018 third round pick (West Coast)	Port Adelaide	North Melbourne	Pick 46	
31	2018 third round pick (St Kilda)	Port Adelaide	North Melbourne	2018 third round pick (North Melbourne)	

Note

- The numbering of the draft picks in this list may be different to the agreed draft picks at the time of the trade, due to adjustments from either the insertion of free agency compensation draft picks or clubs exiting the draft before later rounds.

=== Free agency ===
2017 AFL free agency period signings
Player	Date	Free agent type	Former club	New club	Compensation	Ref
Jackson Trengove	6 October 2017	Restricted	Port Adelaide	Western Bulldogs	None^{[a]}	
Tom Rockliff	11 October 2017	Restricted	Brisbane Lions	Port Adelaide	End of first round	
Steven Motlop	14 October 2017	Restricted	Geelong	Port Adelaide	End of first round	
Alex Morgan	1 November 2017	Delisted	Essendon	North Melbourne	—N/a	
Aaron Mullett	1 November 2017	Delisted	North Melbourne	Carlton	—N/a	
Lachlan Keeffe	2 November 2017	Delisted	Collingwood	Greater Western Sydney	—N/a	
Trent McKenzie	2 November 2017	Delisted	Gold Coast	Port Adelaide	—N/a	
Jack Trengove	3 November 2017	Delisted	Melbourne	Port Adelaide	—N/a	

=== Retirements and delistings ===
List of 2017 AFL player changes

Name	Club	Date	Notes	Ref.
Chris Yarran	Richmond	22 November 2016	Retired due to mental health issues, effective immediately	
Shane Yarran	Fremantle	19 December 2016	Retired, effective immediately	
Heritier Lumumba	Melbourne	21 December 2016	Retired due to ongoing concussion, effective immediately	
Yestin Eades	Essendon	15 February 2017	Delisted	
Sean Dempster	St Kilda	6 April 2017	Retired due to ongoing concussion, effective immediately	
Paddy Brophy	West Coast	25 April 2017	Retired, effective immediately	
Luke Surman	Hawthorn	15 May 2017	Retired, effective immediately	
Tom Downie	Greater Western Sydney	26 May 2017	Retired due to mental health issues, effective immediately	
Ivan Maric	Richmond	29 June 2017	Retired, effective at the end of the season	
Scott Thompson	Adelaide	25 July 2017	Retired, effective at the end of the season	
Matt Priddis	West Coast	28 July 2017	Retired, effective at the end of the season	
Nick Riewoldt	St Kilda	31 July 2017	Retired, effective at the end of the season	
Sam Mitchell	West Coast	2 August 2017	Retired, effective at the end of the season	
Matthew Boyd	Western Bulldogs	8 August 2017	Retired, effective at the end of the season	
Dennis Armfield	Carlton	8 August 2017	Retired, effective at the end of the season	
Jobe Watson	Essendon	9 August 2017	Retired, effective at the end of the season	
Steve Johnson	Greater Western Sydney	10 August 2017	Retired, effective at the end of the season	
Jesse White	Collingwood	10 August 2017	Retired, effective at the end of the season	
Bob Murphy	Western Bulldogs	15 August 2017	Retired, effective at the end of the season	
Josh Gibson	Hawthorn	15 August 2017	Retired, effective at the end of the season	
James Kelly	Essendon	16 August 2017	Retired, effective at the end of the season	
Zac Dawson	Fremantle	17 August 2017	Retired, effective at the end of the season	
Jack Fitzpatrick	Hawthorn	21 August 2017	Retired due to ongoing concussion, effective immediately	
Sam Butler	West Coast	22 August 2017	Retired, effective at the end of the season	
Garrick Ibbotson	Fremantle	22 August 2017	Retired, effective at the end of the season	
Brent Stanton	Essendon	24 August 2017	Retired, effective at the end of the season	
Andrew Mackie	Geelong	26 August 2017	Retired, effective at the end of the season	
Tom Lonergan	Geelong	26 August 2017	Retired, effective at the end of the season	
Drew Petrie	West Coast	27 August 2017	Retired, effective at the end of the season	
Lachlan Hansen	North Melbourne	29 August 2017	Delisted	
Leigh Montagna	St Kilda	30 August 2017	Retired	
Will Fordham	North Melbourne	30 August 2017	Delisted	
Matthew Taylor	North Melbourne	30 August 2017	Delisted	
Nick Coughlan	St Kilda	31 August 2017	Delisted	
Joe Baker-Thomas	St Kilda	31 August 2017	Delisted	
Kristian Jaksch	Carlton	31 August 2017	Delisted	
Liam Sumner	Carlton	31 August 2017	Delisted	
Andrew Gallucci	Carlton	31 August 2017	Delisted	
Daniel Gorringe	Carlton	31 August 2017	Retired	
Matthew Korcheck	Carlton	31 August 2017	Retired	
Jarrad Grant	Gold Coast	4 September 2017	Delisted	
Mitch Hallahan	Gold Coast	4 September 2017	Delisted	
Keegan Brooksby	Gold Coast	4 September 2017	Delisted	
Ryan Davis	Gold Coast	4 September 2017	Delisted	
Cameron Loersch	Gold Coast	4 September 2017	Delisted	
Josh Prudden	Western Bulldogs	8 September 2017	Delisted	
Ryan Harwood	Brisbane Lions	12 September 2017	Delisted	
Jarrad Jansen	Brisbane Lions	12 September 2017	Delisted	
Josh Clayton	Brisbane Lions	12 September 2017	Delisted	
Jonathan Freeman	Brisbane Lions	12 September 2017	Delisted	
Blake Grewar	Brisbane Lions	12 September 2017	Delisted	
Declan Hamilton	Western Bulldogs	12 September 2017	Delisted	
Liam Hulett	Melbourne	12 September 2017	Delisted	
Jake Spencer	Melbourne	12 September 2017	Delisted	
Jack Trengove	Melbourne	12 September 2017	Delisted, joined Port Adelaide as a Free Agent	
Mitch White	Melbourne	12 September 2017	Delisted	
Heath Hocking	Essendon	15 September 2017	Delisted	
Tristan Tweedie	Western Bulldogs	19 September 2017	Delisted	
Jonathan Giles	West Coast	21 September 2017	Retired due to a knee injury	
Brandon Jack	Sydney	22 September 2017	Delisted	
Michael Talia	Sydney	22 September 2017	Delisted	
Tyrone Leonardis	Sydney	22 September 2017	Delisted	
Shaun Edwards	Sydney	22 September 2017	Retired	
Jeremy Laidler	Sydney	26 September 2017	Retired	
Simon Tunbridge	West Coast	27 September 2017	Delisted	
Josh Cowan	Geelong	28 September 2017	Delisted	
Tendai Mzungu	Greater Western Sydney	28 September 2017	Retired	
Ben Kennedy	Melbourne	2 October 2017	Delisted	
Nathan Krakouer	Port Adelaide	4 October 2017	Retired	
Zac Clarke	Fremantle	6 October 2017	Delisted	
Jonathon Griffin	Fremantle	6 October 2017	Delisted	
Sam Collins	Fremantle	6 October 2017	Delisted	
Josh Deluca	Fremantle	6 October 2017	Delisted	
Matthew Uebergang	Fremantle	6 October 2017	Delisted	
Troy Menzel	Adelaide	7 October 2017	Delisted	
Dean Gore	Adelaide	7 October 2017	Delisted	
Steven Morris	Richmond	9 October 2017	Delisted	
Todd Elton	Richmond	9 October 2017	Delisted	
Taylor Hunt	Richmond	9 October 2017	Delisted	
Aaron Mullett	North Melbourne	10 October 2017	Delisted, joined Carlton as a Free Agent	
Corey Wagner	North Melbourne	10 October 2017	Delisted	
Angus Monfries	Port Adelaide	10 October 2017	Retired	
Lachlan Keeffe	Collingwood	10 October 2017	Delisted, joined Greater Western Sydney as a Free Agent	
Liam Mackie	Collingwood	10 October 2017	Delisted	
Mitch McCarthy	Collingwood	10 October 2017	Delisted	
Henry Schade	Collingwood	10 October 2017	Delisted	
Colin Garland	Melbourne	19 October 2017	Retired	
Shane Mumford	Greater Western Sydney	20 October 2017	Retired	
Dylan Buckley	Carlton	20 October 2017	Delisted	
Rhys Palmer	Carlton	20 October 2017	Delisted	
Ciaran Sheehan	Carlton	20 October 2017	Delisted	
Jason Holmes	St Kilda	23 October 2017	Delisted	
Lewis Pierce	St Kilda	23 October 2017	Delisted	
Craig Bird	Essendon	24 October 2017	Delisted	
Ben Howlett	Essendon	24 October 2017	Delisted	
Travis Cloke	Western Bulldogs	25 October 2017	Retired	
Stewart Crameri	Western Bulldogs	25 October 2017	Delisted	
Tom Gorter	West Coast	25 October 2017	Delisted	
Josh Hill	West Coast	25 October 2017	Delisted	
Tom Lamb	West Coast	25 October 2017	Delisted	
Jordan Snadden	West Coast	25 October 2017	Delisted	
Sharrod Wellingham	West Coast	25 October 2017	Delisted	
Ben Lennon	Richmond	26 October 2017	Delisted	
Jake Batchelor	Richmond	26 October 2017	Delisted	
Billy Hartung	Hawthorn	26 October 2017	Delisted	
Kade Stewart	Hawthorn	26 October 2017	Delisted	
Dallas Willsmore	Hawthorn	26 October 2017	Delisted	
Claye Beams	Brisbane Lions	26 October 2017	Delisted	
Michael Close	Brisbane Lions	26 October 2017	Delisted	
Cian Hanley	Brisbane Lions	26 October 2017	Delisted	
Matt Hammelmann	Brisbane Lions	26 October 2017	Delisted	
Reuben William	Brisbane Lions	26 October 2017	Delisted	
Nick O'Kearney	St Kilda	27 October 2017	Delisted	
Nick Suban	Fremantle	27 October 2017	Delisted	
Matt White	Port Adelaide	29 October 2017	Delisted	
Jesse Palmer	Port Adelaide	29 October 2017	Delisted	
Brett Eddy	Port Adelaide	29 October 2017	Delisted	
Ben Sinclair	Collingwood	30 October 2017	Retired	
Adam Oxley	Collingwood	30 October 2017	Delisted	
Jackson Ramsay	Collingwood	30 October 2017	Delisted	
Tom Ruggles	Geelong	30 October 2017	Delisted	
Matthew Hayball	Geelong	30 October 2017	Delisted	
Cam Ellis-Yolmen	Adelaide	30 October 2017	Delisted	
Jono Beech	Adelaide	30 October 2017	Delisted	
Daniel Currie	Gold Coast	30 October 2017	Delisted	
Trent McKenzie	Gold Coast	30 October 2017	Delisted, joined Port Adelaide as a Free Agent	
Matt Shaw	Gold Coast	30 October 2017	Delisted	
Mackenzie Willis	Gold Coast	30 October 2017	Delisted	
Simon White	Carlton	31 October 2017	Delisted	
Blaine Boekhorst	Carlton	31 October 2017	Delisted	
Billie Smedts	Carlton	31 October 2017	Delisted	
Alex Morgan	Essendon	31 October 2017	Delisted, joined North Melbourne as a Free Agent	
Sam Reid	Greater Western Sydney	31 October 2017	Delisted	
Alex Johnson	Sydney	31 October 2017	Delisted	
Sam Fisher	Sydney	31 October 2017	Delisted	
Roarke Smith	Western Bulldogs	31 October 2017	Delisted	
Lindsay Thomas	North Melbourne	3 November 2017	Delisted	
Andrew Swallow	North Melbourne	9 November 2017	Retired	

== 2017 national draft ==
As the Greater Western Sydney Giants were penalised 1,000 draft points by the AFL for the club's handling of Lachie Whitfield's attempt to avoid a potential drug test, their first round pick (pick 15) was moved back to pick 65.

Indicative draft order as of 19 October 2017

^	Denotes player who has been inducted to the Australian Football Hall of Fame
*	Denotes player who has been a premiership player and been selected for at least one All-Australian team
^{+}	Denotes player who has been a premiership player at least once
^{x}	Denotes player who has been selected for at least one All-Australian team
^{#}	Denotes player who has never played in a VFL/AFL home and away season or finals game
^{~}	Denotes player who has been selected as Rising Star

Round	Pick	Player	Drafted to	Recruited from	League	Notes
1	1	Cameron Rayner	Brisbane Lions	Western Jets	TAC Cup	
1	2	Andrew Brayshaw	Fremantle	Sandringham Dragons	TAC Cup	Traded from Gold Coast
1	3	Paddy Dow	Carlton	Bendigo Pioneers	TAC Cup	
1	4	Luke Davies-Uniacke	North Melbourne	Dandenong Stingrays	TAC Cup	
1	5	Adam Cerra	Fremantle	Eastern Ranges	TAC Cup	
1	6	Jaidyn Stephenson	Collingwood	Eastern Ranges	TAC Cup	
1	7	Hunter Clark	St Kilda	Dandenong Stingrays	TAC Cup	Traded from Hawthorn
1	8	Nick Coffield	St Kilda	Northern Knights	TAC Cup	
1	9	Aaron Naughton	Western Bulldogs	Peel Thunder	WAFL	
1	10	Lochie O'Brien	Carlton	Bendigo Pioneers	TAC Cup	Traded from Adelaide; received from Melbourne
1	11	Aiden Bonar	Greater Western Sydney	Dandenong Stingrays	TAC Cup	Traded from Essendon
1	12	Darcy Fogarty	Adelaide	Glenelg	SANFL	Traded from Brisbane Lions; received from Port Adelaide
1	13	Jarrod Brander	West Coast	Bendigo Pioneers	TAC Cup	
1	14	Matthew Ling	Sydney	Geelong Falcons	TAC Cup	
1	15	Zac Bailey	Brisbane Lions	Norwood	SANFL	Traded from Rich; received from Geel, Carl, GWS
1	16	Ed Richards	Western Bulldogs	Oakleigh Chargers	TAC Cup	Traded from Carlton; received from Adelaide
1	17	Jack Higgins	Richmond	Oakleigh Chargers	TAC Cup	
1	18	Brandon Starcevich	Brisbane Lions	East Perth	WAFL	Free agency compensation pick (Rockliff)
1	19	Wil Powell	Gold Coast	Claremont	WAFL	Traded from Geelong; free agency compensation pick (Motlop)
2	20	Callum Coleman-Jones	Richmond	Sturt	SANFL	Traded from Brisbane Lions
2	21	Oscar Allen	West Coast	West Perth	WAFL	Traded from Gold Coast
2	22	Lachie Fogarty	Geelong	Western Jets	TAC Cup	Traded from Carlton
2	23	Will Walker	North Melbourne	Sandringham Dragons	TAC Cup	
2	24	Tim Kelly	Geelong	South Fremantle	WAFL	Traded from Gold Coast; received from Fremantle
2	25	Noah Balta	Richmond	Calder Cannons	TAC Cup	Traded from Bris; received from W.B - Ess - GWS - Coll
2	26	Liam Ryan	West Coast	Subiaco	WAFL	Traded from Gold Coast; received from Hawthorn
2	27	Brent Daniels	Greater Western Sydney	Bendigo Pioneers	TAC Cup	Traded from St Kilda
2	28	Sam Taylor	Greater Western Sydney	Swan Districts	WAFL	Traded from Carlton; received from Western Bulldogs
2	29	Charlie Spargo	Melbourne	Murray Bushrangers	TAC Cup	
2	30	Tom De Koning	Carlton	Dandenong Stingrays	TAC Cup	Traded from Western Bulldogs; received from Essendon
2	31	Bayley Fritsch	Melbourne	Casey	VFL	Traded from Port Adelaide
2	32	Brayden Ainsworth	West Coast	Subiaco	WAFL	
2	33	Tom McCartin	Sydney	Geelong Falcons	TAC Cup	
2	34	Patrick Naish	Richmond	Northern Knights	TAC Cup	Father–son selection (son of Chris Naish)
2	35	Oscar Clavarino	St Kilda	Dandenong Stingrays	TAC Cup	Traded from Port; received from Haw, GWS, Carl
2	36	Charlie Constable	Geelong	Sandringham Dragons	TAC Cup	
2	37	Harrison Petty	Melbourne	Norwood	SANFL	Traded from Adelaide
3	38	Jack Petruccelle	West Coast	Northern Knights	TAC Cup	Traded from Gold Coast; received from Richmond
3	39	Nathan Murphy	Collingwood	Sandringham Dragons	TAC Cup	Traded from Brisbane Lions
3	40	Andrew McPherson	Adelaide	Woodville-West Torrens	SANFL	Traded from Gold Coast
3	41	Toby Wooller	Brisbane Lions	Oakleigh Chargers	TAC Cup	Traded from Western Bulldogs; received from Carlton
3	42	Charlie Ballard	Gold Coast	Sturt	SANFL	Traded from Freo; received from W.B, North
3	43	Connor Ballenden	Brisbane Lions	Brisbane	NEAFL	Academy selection
3	44	Hugh Dixon	Fremantle	Tigers	TSL	
3	45	James Worpel	Hawthorn	Geelong Falcons	TAC Cup	Traded from Brisbane Lions; received from Collingwood
3	46	Ben Paton	St Kilda	Murray Bushrangers	TAC Cup	
3	47	Sam Hayes	Port Adelaide	Eastern Ranges	TAC Cup	Traded from North Melbourne; received from Western Bulldogs
3	48	Oskar Baker	Melbourne	Aspley	NEAFL	
3	49	Jordan Houlahan	Essendon	Sturt	SANFL	
3	50	Tyler Brown	Collingwood	Eastern Ranges	TAC Cup	Father–son selection (son of Gavin Brown)
3	51	Kane Farrell	Port Adelaide	Bendigo Pioneers	TAC Cup	
3	52	Brayden Crossley	Gold Coast	Palm Beach Currumbin	QAFL	Academy selection, Traded from West Coast
3	53	Ryley Stoddart	Sydney	Eastern Ranges	TAC Cup	
3	54	Jack Payne	Brisbane Lions	Noosa	QAFL	Traded from Rich; received from GWS; academy selection
3	55	Connor Nutting	Gold Coast	Broadbeach	QAFL	Academy selection
4	56	Zac Langdon	Greater Western Sydney	Claremont	WAFL	Traded by Fremantle; received from Gold Coast
4	57	Gryan Miers	Geelong	Geelong Falcons	TAC Cup	Traded from Carlton
4	58	Jake Patmore	Port Adelaide	Claremont	WAFL	Traded from St K; received from North, W.B.
4	59	Mitch Crowden	Fremantle	Sturt	SANFL	
4	60	Joel Garner	Port Adelaide	Eastern Ranges	TAC Cup	Traded from Hawthorn
4	61	Dom Barry	Port Adelaide	Glenelg	SANFL	Traded from St Kilda
4	62	Kyron Hayden	North Melbourne	Subiaco	WAFL	Traded from Western Bulldogs
4	63	Ben Miller	Richmond	Subiaco	WAFL	
4	64	Nick Shipley	Greater Western Sydney	St George	Sydney AFL	Originally pick No.15, but slid down due to 1,000 point penalty following the Lachie Whitfield saga; academy selection
4	65	Tom North	Fremantle	Eastern Ranges	TAC Cup	Traded from Melbourne
4	66	Brandon Zerk-Thatcher	Essendon	Sturt	SANFL	
4	67	Dylan Moore	Hawthorn	Eastern Ranges	TAC Cup	Traded from Port Adelaide
4	68	Hamish Brayshaw	West Coast	Sandringham Dragons	TAC Cup	
4	69	Lloyd Meek	Fremantle	Greater Western Victoria Rebels	TAC Cup	Traded from Greater Western Sydney
4	70	Angus Schumacher	Carlton	Bendigo Pioneers	TAC Cup	Traded from Adelaide
5	71	Jackson Ross	Hawthorn	Eastern Ranges	TAC Cup	Traded from Brisbane Lions
5	72	Tristan Xerri	North Melbourne	Western Jets	TAC Cup	
5	73	Sam Switkowski	Fremantle	Box Hill	VFL	
5	74	Callum Porter	Western Bulldogs	Gippsland Power	TAC Cup	Traded from St Kilda
5	75	Scott Jones	Fremantle	East Perth	WAFL	Traded from Western Bulldogs
5	76	Matt Guelfi	Essendon	Claremont	WAFL	
5	77	Billy Hartung	North Melbourne	Hawthorn	AFL	Traded from Adelaide
6	78	Jarrod Garlett	Carlton	South Fremantle	WAFL	

=== Rookie elevations ===
Clubs were able to promote any player who was listed on their rookie list in 2017 to their 2018 primary playing list prior to the draft.

Player	Club	Ref.
Hugh Greenwood	Adelaide	
Alex Keath	Adelaide	
Mason Cox	Collingwood	
Jake Long	Essendon	
Brady Grey	Fremantle	
James Parsons	Geelong	
Joel Smith	Melbourne	
Jason Castagna	Richmond	
Ivan Soldo	Richmond	
Lewis Melican	Sydney	
Colin O'Riordan	Sydney	

== 2018 pre-season draft ==
The 2018 pre-season draft was the first to be held since 2014

Round	Pick	Player	Drafted to	Recruited from	League	Notes
1	1	Cam O'Shea	Carlton	Northern Blues	VFL	

== 2018 rookie draft ==
Round	Pick	Player	Drafted to	Recruited from	League	Notes
1	1	Claye Beams	Brisbane Lions	Brisbane Lions	AFL	
1	2	Josh Jaska	Gold Coast	Geelong Falcons	TAC Cup	
1	3	Matt Shaw	Carlton	Gold Coast	AFL	
1	4	Tom Murphy	North Melbourne	Dandenong Stingrays	TAC Cup	
1	5	Bailey Banfield	Fremantle	Claremont	WAFL	
1	6	Flynn Appleby	Collingwood	Greater Western Victoria Rebels	TAC Cup	
1	7	Harry Jones	Hawthorn	Murray Bushrangers	TAC Cup	
1	8	Doulton Langlands	St Kilda	Murray Bushrangers	TAC Cup	
1	9	Billy Gowers	Western Bulldogs	Footscray	VFL	
1	10	Passed	Melbourne	—	—	
1	11	Trent Mynott	Essendon	Eastern Ranges	TAC Cup	
1	12	Lindsay Thomas	Port Adelaide	North Melbourne	AFL	
1	13	Ryan Burrows	West Coast	South Fremantle	WAFL	
1	14	Angus Styles	Sydney	Sandringham Dragons	TAC Cup	
1	15	Dylan Buckley	Greater Western Sydney	Carlton	AFL	
1	16	Stewart Crameri	Geelong	Western Bulldogs	AFL	
1	17	Patrick Wilson	Adelaide	Sturt	SANFL	
1	18	Liam Baker	Richmond	Subiaco	WAFL	
2	19	Nick Holman	Gold Coast	Central District	SANFL	
2	20	Gordon Narrier	North Melbourne	Perth	WAFL	
2	21	Stefan Giro	Fremantle	Norwood	SANFL	
2	22	Brody Mihocek	Collingwood	Port Melbourne	VFL	
2	23	David Mirra	Hawthorn	Box Hill	VFL	
2	24	Lewis Pierce	St Kilda	St Kilda	AFL	
2	25	Roarke Smith	Western Bulldogs	Western Bulldogs	AFL	
2	26	Passed	Essendon	—	—	
2	27	Tony Olango	West Coast	NT Thunder	NEAFL	
2	28	Joel Amartey	Sydney	Sandringham Dragons	TAC Cup	
2	29	Sam Reid	Greater Western Sydney	Greater Western Sydney	AFL	
2	30	Matthew Hayball	Geelong	Geelong	AFL	
2	31	Cam Ellis-Yolmen	Adelaide	Adelaide	AFL	
3	32	Mackenzie Willis	Gold Coast	Gold Coast	AFL	
3	33	Adam Oxley	Collingwood	Collingwood	AFL	
3	34	Dallas Willsmore	Hawthorn	Hawthorn	AFL	
3	35	Callan England	West Coast	Claremont	WAFL	
3	36	Alex Johnson	Sydney	Sydney	AFL	
3	37	Passed	Greater Western Sydney	—	—	
3	38	Lachlan Murphy	Adelaide	Adelaide	SANFL	
4	39	Passed	Gold Coast	—	—	
4	40	Passed	Greater Western Sydney	—	—	
4	41	Jackson Edwards	Adelaide	Glenelg	SANFL	Father–son selection (son of Tyson Edwards)
5	42	Passed	Greater Western Sydney	—	—	

=== Category B rookie selections ===
During the trade period, clubs could nominate category B rookies to join their club.

Player	Club	Origin	Note	Ref.
Cian Hanley	Brisbane Lions	Mayo GAA, Brisbane Lions	International selection (Ireland)	
Cillian McDaid	Carlton	Galway GAA	International selection (Ireland)	
Jack Madgen	Collingwood	Delta State University	3-year non-registered player (basketball)	
Luke Lavender	Essendon	Southern Redbacks	3-year non-registered player (cricket)	
Jacob Dawson	Gold Coast	Palm Beach Currumbin	Queensland zone selection	
Jacob Heron	Gold Coast	Cairns Saints	Queensland zone selection	
Jack Buckley	Greater Western Sydney	UWS Giants	NSW zone selection	
Changkuoth Jiath	Hawthorn	Gippsland Power	Next Generation Academy zone selection (born in Ethiopia)	
Tom Jeffries	North Melbourne	Werribee	3-year non-registered player (rugby)	
Derek Eggmolesse-Smith	Richmond	Richmond VFL	Next Generation Academy zone selection (Indigenous)	
James Bell	Sydney	UNSW-Eastern Suburbs	NSW zone selection	
Jake Brown	Sydney	St George	NSW zone selection	

== See also ==
- 2017 AFL Women's draft

== Footnotes ==
- ^{a} Port Adelaide initially received a second round compensation pick for losing Jackson Trengove through free agency, however, the compensation pick was withdrawn after the club signed Tom Rockliff as a free agent.
