= Sam Reid (footballer, born 1989) =

Australian rules footballer

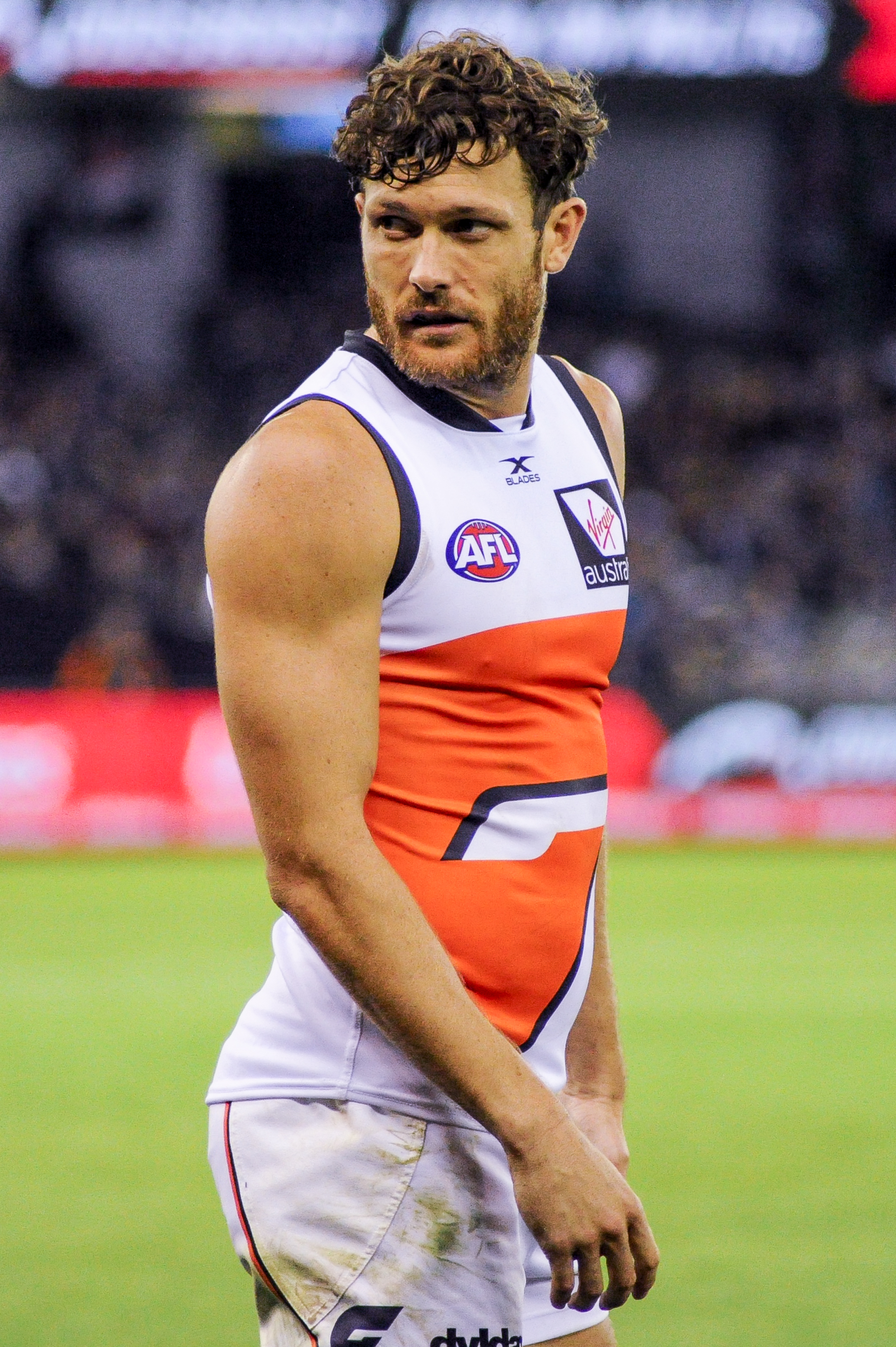
- Reid playing for Greater Western Sydney in June 2017

Personal information
- Full name: Sam Reid
- Born: 7 November 1989 (age 37); Bundaberg, Queensland
- Original team: Zillmere Eagles (QAFL)
- Draft: No. 35, 2007 national draft
- Height: 187 cm (6 ft 2 in)
- Weight: 86 kg (190 lb)
- Position: Defender

Playing career^{1}
Years	Club	Games (Goals)
2008–2011	Western Bulldogs	10 (1)
2012–2013; 2016–2021	Greater Western Sydney	98 (32)
Total		108 (33)
- ^{1} Playing statistics correct to the end of 2021.

Sam J. Reid (born 7 November 1989) is a former professional Australian rules footballer who played for the Greater Western Sydney Giants and Western Bulldogs in the Australian Football League (AFL).

== Early life ==
Reid was born in Bundaberg, Queensland and grew up on the Sunshine Coast. He played junior football for the Caloundra Panthers before switching to the Zillmere Eagles closer to his draft year to increase his chances of being selected by an AFL club.

== AFL career ==
Reid was drafted to the Western Bulldogs with the 35th selection in the 2007 AFL draft. He debuted against Adelaide in the final round of the regular season of 2008.

In 2009, he had major groin surgery for his osteitis pubis. This surgery was thought to have also triggered his Type 1 diabetes which shortly followed the surgery.

In 2011 he was recruited by the new Greater Western Sydney Giants as an uncontracted player. He made his debut for the Giants in their Round 5 match against the Bulldogs in Canberra at Manuka Oval.

After being delisted at the end of the 2013 season, Sam accepted a role from the Giants to stay at the club in a coaching role (development coach).

He was re-drafted by Greater Western Sydney in the 2016 rookie draft. He was delisted again at the conclusion of the 2017 season, however, the club stated they might re-draft him in the 2018 rookie draft if he was still available. In fact, he was still available when the Giants used their first pick, and they drafted him 29th overall. He went on to play almost every game in 2018 and 2019, including the 2019 AFL Grand Final.

For the third and final time, Reid was delisted at the conclusion of the 2021 AFL season.
