= Will Walker (Australian footballer) =

Australian rules footballer

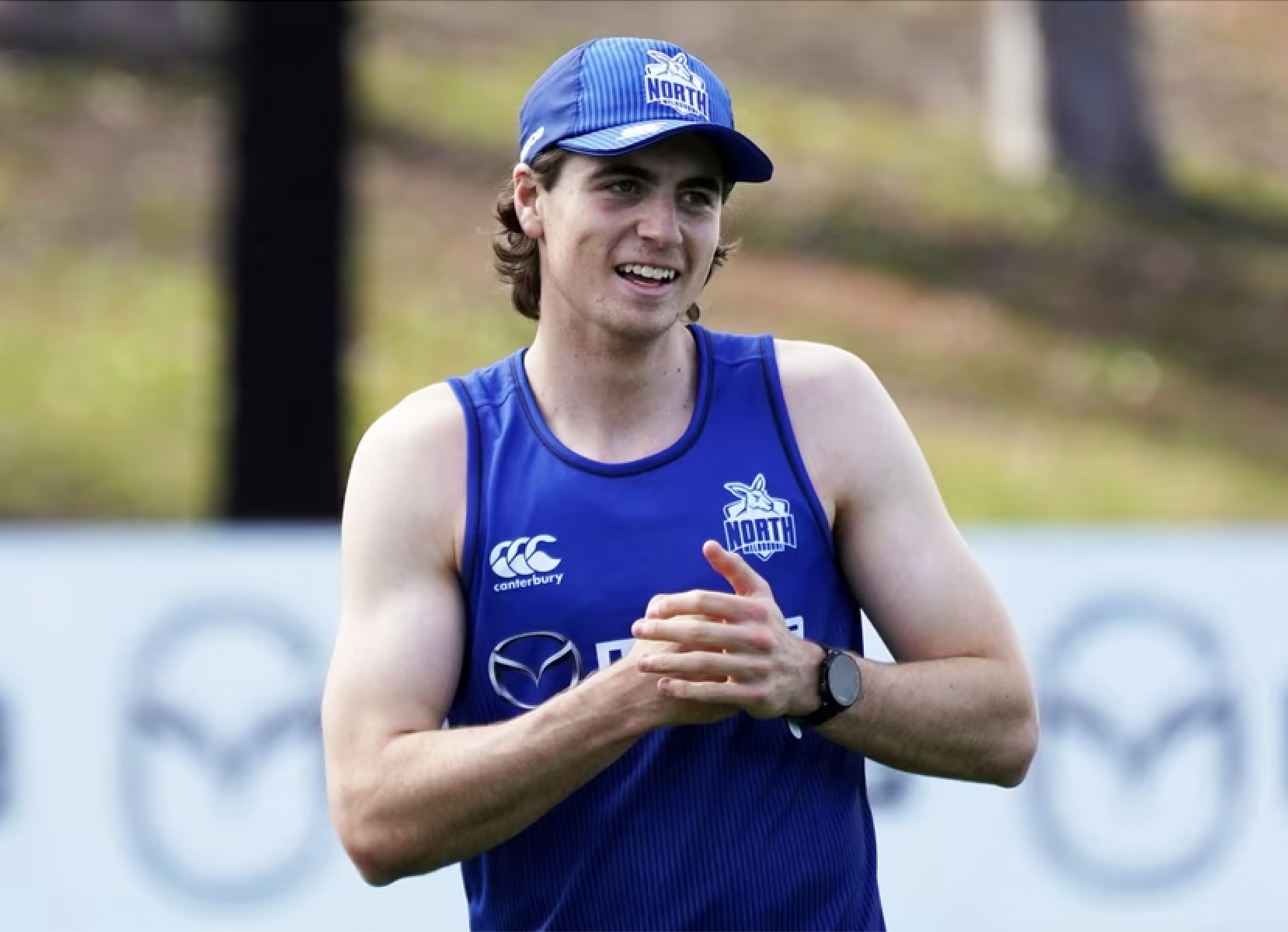
- Will Walker of North Melbourne Football Club

Personal information
- Full name: William Alexander Walker VI
- Born: 30 March 1999 (age 27); Canberra, Australia
- Original teams: Hampton Rovers Football Club (Victorian Amateur Football Association), Sandringham Dragons (TAC Cup)
- Draft: 23, 2017 national draft
- Debut: 29 July 2018, North Melbourne vs. West Coast, at Bellerive Oval
- Height: 187 cm (6 ft 2 in)
- Weight: 83 kg (183 lb)
- Positions: Midfielder, Forward

Playing career^{1}
Years	Club	Games (Goals)
2018–2021	North Melbourne	6 (4)
- ^{1} Playing statistics correct to the end of 2020.

Will Walker (born 30 March 1999) is a professional Australian rules footballer who played for North Melbourne in the Australian Football League (AFL). He made his debut in round 19 of the 2018 season against West Coast at Bellerive Oval.

Walker attended Melbourne High School and graduated from the school in 2017 as the sports champion after winning Victorian state titles in swimming, athletics and cross-country. Walker played both soccer and football in his youth. He left football for several years to focus on soccer, but returned in 2016, when he was 16, to play for the Sandringham Dragons in the TAC Cup. Walker said his switch was influenced by friends who played football. Walker impressed in his 2017 season (notably kicking three last-quarter goals in a strong performance against the Western Jets) but was not considered a top-30 draft prospect. He was drafted by North Melbourne with pick 23 in the 2017 national draft, their second selection. North Melbourne's National Recruiting Manager Mark Finnigan cited his speed as a reason for his selection. Walker suffered glandular fever at the start of 2018, but recovered to play consistent football in the Victorian Football League. Walker was named as a North Melbourne emergency several times before coach Brad Scott confirmed that he would debut against West Coast in round 19.

Walker was delisted at the conclusion of the 2021 AFL season.
