= Sam Taylor (Australian footballer) =

Australian rules footballer (born 1999)

Personal information
- Full name: Samuel Taylor
- Born: 5 May 1999 (age 27)
- Original team: Swan Districts(WAFL)
- Draft: 28, 2017 national draft
- Debut: Round 11, 2018, Greater Western Sydney vs. Adelaide, at Adelaide Oval
- Height: 198 cm (6 ft 6 in)
- Weight: 95 kg (209 lb)
- Position: Key defender

Club information
- Current club: Greater Western Sydney
- Number: 15

Playing career^{1}
Years	Club	Games (Goals)
2018–	Greater Western Sydney	141 (2)

Representative team honours
Years	Team	Games (Goals)
2026	Western Australia	1 (0)
- ^{1} Playing statistics correct to the end of round 22, 2026.

Career highlights
- 2x All-Australian team: 2022, 2025; Kevin Sheedy Medal: 2022; AFL Rising Star nominee: 2018

Samuel Taylor (born 5 May 1999) is a professional Australian rules footballer playing for the Greater Western Sydney Giants in the Australian Football League (AFL). He is a tall defender. Taylor made his debut in round 11 of the 2018 season against the Adelaide Crows at Adelaide Oval.

Originally from Bullsbrook, Western Australia, Taylor's parents are Susan and Graham. He is the third of the family's seven children and was educated at Guildford Grammar School. He played at colts level for Swan Districts in the West Australian Football League (WAFL) in 2016 and the first half of 2017 before transitioning to league level. He is a graduate of the AFL Academy and played in the AFL Under 18 Championships for Western Australia, receiving All-Australian honours. He was drafted by the GWS Giants with pick 28 in the 2017 national draft.

== AFL career ==
Taylor made his debut in Round 11, 2018, against Adelaide. He played nearly a full season in 2019, including making an appearance in GWS's first-ever (albeit unsuccessful) AFL Grand Final.

In the COVID-affected 2020 season, after just four games for the year, Taylor was admitted to hospital with what was later diagnosed as septic arthritis in his pelvis and ankle. He was initially only expected to miss a month of football, but he ended up not playing for the rest of the season.

Taylor played from the start of 2021, but he had a six-game break after Round 10 due to an ankle injury.

Taylor played 22 out of 23 games in 2022, but a hamstring injury in 2023 saw him miss seven games.

In Round 5, 2024, Taylor was knocked out cold, causing the game to be paused for about ten minutes until he was subbed out on a medical. The Age’s Andrew Wu wrote: "Sam Taylor is as brave a player as they come. Broadcasters not showing a replay for good reason. Genuinely frightening stuff." GWS's head of football, Jason McCartney, provided an update on Taylor following the quarter-time break: "He’s been taken to Canberra hospital for further assessment[,] but he was conscious and speaking as he got in the ambulance. Obviously it didn’t look great, but he’s a courageous kid and he’s in the very best hands and he’ll be fine."

== Statistics ==
Updated to the end of round 22, 2026.

Legend
G	Goals	K	Kicks	D	Disposals	T	Tackles
B	Behinds	H	Handballs	M	Marks

Season	Team	No.	Games	Totals							Averages (per game)							Votes
Season	Team	No.	Games	G	B	K	H	D	M	T	G	B	K	H	D	M	T	Votes
2018	Greater Western Sydney	15	8	0	0	32	39	71	16	24	0.0	0.0	4.0	4.9	8.9	2.0	3.0	0
2019	Greater Western Sydney	15	22	1	0	115	122	237	84	36	0.0	0.0	5.2	5.5	10.8	3.8	1.6	0
2020 (Note: The 2020 season was played with 17 home-and-away matches per team (down from 22) and 16-minute quarters with time on (down from 20-minute quarters with time on) due to the impact of the COVID-19 pandemic.)	Greater Western Sydney	15	4	0	1	10	22	32	11	10	0.0	0.3	2.5	5.5	8.0	2.8	2.5	0
2021	Greater Western Sydney	15	19	0	0	164	109	273	116	40	0.0	0.0	8.6	5.7	14.4	6.1	2.1	0
2022	Greater Western Sydney	15	22	0	0	190	145	335	132	59	0.0	0.0	8.6	6.6	15.2	6.0	2.7	1
2023	Greater Western Sydney	15	18	0	0	118	120	238	93	38	0.0	0.0	6.6	6.7	13.2	5.2	2.1	3
2024	Greater Western Sydney	15	18	0	0	105	113	218	85	34	0.0	0.0	5.8	6.3	12.1	4.7	1.9	2
2025	Greater Western Sydney	15	20	1	0	155	125	280	129	39	0.1	0.0	7.8	6.3	14.0	6.5	2.0	2
2026	Greater Western Sydney	15	10	0	0	64	55	119	52	19	0.0	0.0	6.4	5.5	11.9	5.2	1.9	0
Career			141	2	1	953	850	1803	718	299	0.0	0.0	6.8	6.0	12.8	5.1	2.1	8

== Honours and achievements ==
Individual

- 2x All-Australian team: 2022, 2025
