= Stefan Giro =

Australian rules footballer

Personal information
- Full name: Stefan Giro
- Born: 10 March 1999 (age 27)
- Original team: Norwood (SANFL)
- Draft: No. 21, 2018 rookie draft
- Height: 175 cm (5 ft 9 in)
- Weight: 76 kg (168 lb)
- Position: Midfielder / forward

Playing career^{1}
Years	Club	Games (Goals)
2018–2021	Fremantle	11 (3)
2022	West Coast	1 (0)
2022–	Subiaco	39 (23)
- ^{1} Playing statistics correct to the end of round 2, 2025.

Career highlights
- Subiaco Best and Fairest: 2022

Stefan Giro (born 10 March 1999) is an Australian rules footballer who played for the West Coast Eagles Football Club and Fremantle in the Australian Football League (AFL).

== Early career ==
Originally from Hope Valley, a northern suburb of Adelaide, Giro played for Norwood in the South Australian National Football League (SANFL), where he was awarded the MVP for the SANFL Under 18 competition in 2016. He was selected by Fremantle with their second selection, twenty first overall, in the 2018 AFL rookie draft.

== AFL career ==
Giro made his AFL debut for Fremantle in the round 11 of the 2018 AFL season, alongside fellow debutant Scott Jones. On debut he kicked one goal and had 10 disposals as the Dockers lost to the Magpies by 61 points.

Before the start of the 2019 season, Stefan signed a two-year contract extension with Fremantle. Unfortunately for Stefan, his 2019 season ended prematurely after injuring his ACL in Peel Thunder's round 8 clash against Subiaco. Giro was delisted by Fremantle at the end of the 2021 AFL season.

In 2022 he signed with Subiaco in the WAFL. It was in 2022 he played 1 AFL match for West Coast against North Melbourne in round 2 as a covid top up player. Giro missed the 2024 season due to rupturing his ACL.
