= Flynn Appleby =

Australian rules footballer

Personal information
- Born: 21 January 1999 (age 27); Cohuna, Victoria
- Original team: Greater Western Victoria Rebels (TAC Cup)
- Draft: No. 6, 2018 rookie draft
- Debut: 29 April 2018, Collingwood vs. Richmond, at MCG
- Height: 187 cm (6 ft 2 in)
- Weight: 82 kg (181 lb)
- Position: Defender

Playing career^{1}
Years	Club	Games (Goals)
2018–2020	Collingwood	11 (1)
- ^{1} Playing statistics correct to the end of the 2020 season.

Flynn Appleby (born 21 January 1999) is an American college football punter with the Rutgers Scarlet Knights and a former professional Australian rules footballer who played for Collingwood in the Australian Football League.

== State football ==
As a junior, Appleby played for local club Cohuna Kangas. In 2014 he moved to Ballarat, playing junior football in the Ballarat Football League with Ballarat in 2015 and with North Ballarat City in 2016. He also played with the Greater Western Victoria Rebels in the TAC Cup, being named among the best players 12 times in the 18 matches he played, as well as playing one Victorian Football League (VFL) game with North Ballarat. He tested at the Rookie Me Combine in October 2017, then trained with Collingwood's affiliate in the VFL. Due to this, Collingwood were fined $20,000, since players are not allowed to train with an AFL club or state-league counterpart if they attend a combine, with half of the fine being suspended until 31 October 2018.

== AFL career ==
Appleby was drafted by Collingwood with the sixth pick of the 2018 rookie draft, which was their first selection. He made his debut in round 6 of the 2018 season against Richmond at the Melbourne Cricket Ground, as a late replacement for Tom Langdon. During the COVID-19 pandemic, Appleby returned to his parents' dairy farm in Cohuna, helping out with the farm-work while training four times a week at the Cohuna Football Oval with Melbourne player Marty Hore, whose family has a dairy farm near in Leitchville. In November 2020, Appleby was delisted by Collingwood. Appleby was unsuccessful in his attempt to regain a spot on an AFL club's list, though was appointed as captain of the North Melbourne reserves ahead of the 2021 VFL season.

== College career ==
In April 2023, Appleby took over the punting job at Rutgers after enrolling in the summer of 2022.

In March 2024, it was announced that Appleby was not on the roster for the Rutgers football team. The team confirmed that Appleby had left the team and was no longer pursuing football.

== Personal life ==
Appleby grew up in Cohuna, Victoria and is the cousin of golfer Stuart Appleby. His parents, Graham and Megan, own a dairy farm in Cohuna. After moving to Ballarat, Appleby studied and boarded at Ballarat Clarendon College.

== Statistics ==
Statistics are correct to the end of the 2020 season

Legend
G	Goals	K	Kicks	D	Disposals	T	Tackles
B	Behinds	H	Handballs	M	Marks

Season	Team	No.	Games	Totals							Averages (per game)						
Season	Team	No.	Games	G	B	K	H	D	M	T	G	B	K	H	D	M	T
2018	Collingwood	31	9	0	1	72	37	109	36	12	0.0	0.1	8.0	4.1	12.1	4.0	1.3
2019	Collingwood	31	1	0	0	3	4	7	2	1	0.0	0.0	3.0	4.0	7.0	2.0	1.0
2020	Collingwood	31	1	1	2	4	5	9	1	2	1.0	2.0	4.0	5.0	9.0	1.0	2.0
Career			11	1	3	79	46	125	39	15	0.1	0.3	7.2	4.2	11.4	3.5	1.4
