= Lachie Fogarty =

Australian rules footballer

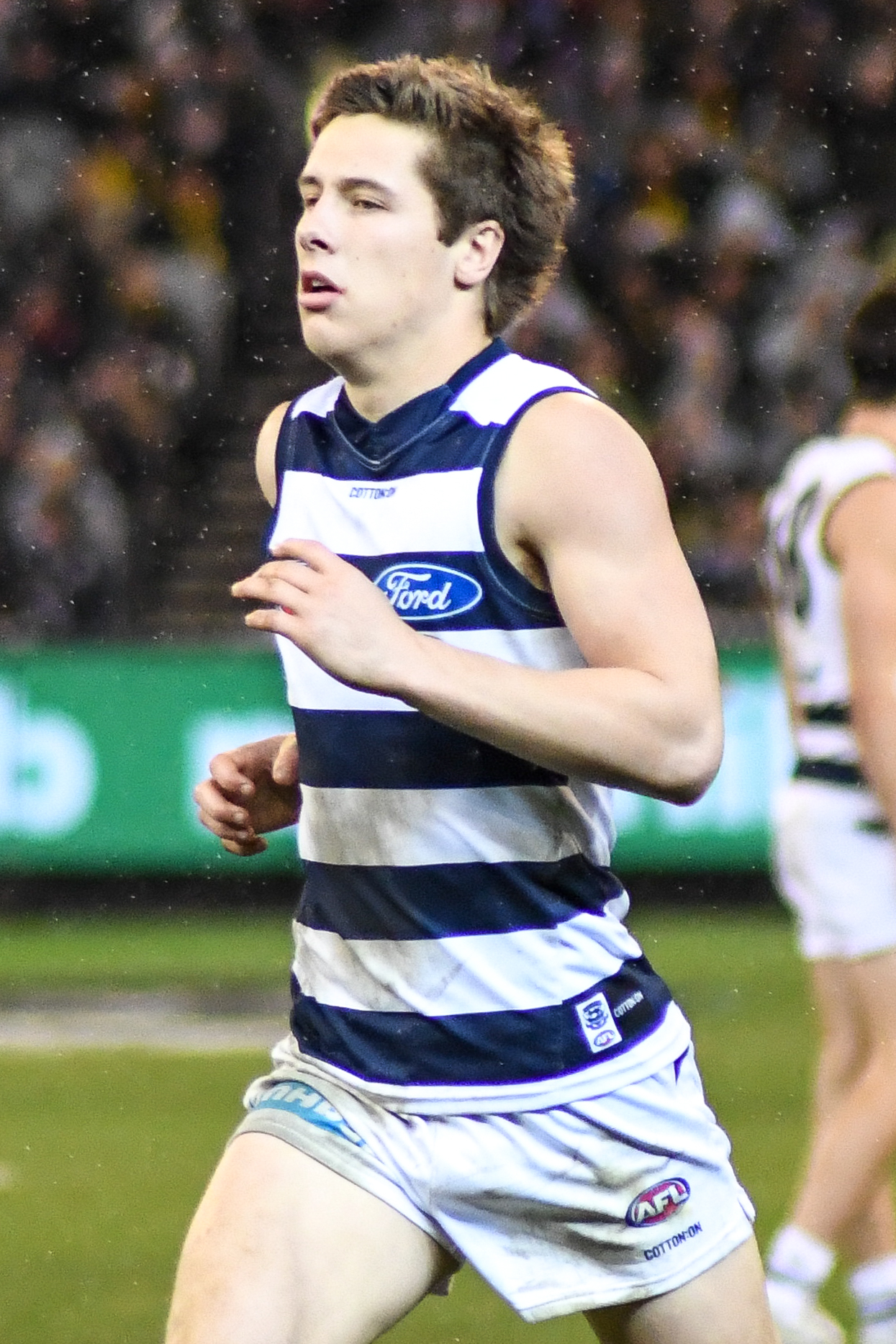
- Fogarty playing for Geelong in August 2018

Personal information
- Full name: Lachlan Fogarty
- Born: 1 April 1999 (age 27)
- Original team: Western Jets (TAC Cup)/St Kevin’s (APS)/Spotswood(WRFL)
- Draft: No. 22, 2017 national draft
- Debut: Round 1, 2018, Geelong vs. Melbourne, at MCG
- Height: 180 cm (5 ft 11 in)
- Weight: 76 kg (168 lb)
- Position: Midfielder

Club information
- Current club: Carlton
- Number: 8

Playing career^{1}
Years	Club	Games (Goals)
2018–2020	Geelong	23 (6)
2021–2026	Carlton	69 (30)
Total		92 (36)
- ^{1} Playing statistics correct to the end of the 2026 season.

Lachlan Fogarty (born 1 April 1999) is a former professional Australian rules footballer playing for the Carlton Football Club in the Australian Football League (AFL). He was drafted by Geelong with their first selection and twenty-second overall in the 2017 national draft. He made his debut in the three point win against Melbourne at the Melbourne Cricket Ground in the opening round of the 2018 season.

Fogarty was traded to Carlton at the conclusion of the 2020 AFL season.

Fogarty was delisted at the end of the 2026 AFL season on 9 September. He received Carlton's VFL best and fairest award for 2026 on the same day.

== Statistics ==
Updated to the end of the 2026 season.

Legend
G	Goals	K	Kicks	D	Disposals	T	Tackles
B	Behinds	H	Handballs	M	Marks

Season	Team	No.	Games	Totals							Averages (per game)							Votes
Season	Team	No.	Games	G	B	K	H	D	M	T	G	B	K	H	D	M	T	Votes
2018	Geelong	13	15	5	12	109	90	199	37	52	0.3	0.8	7.3	6.0	13.3	2.5	3.5	0
2019	Geelong	13	2	0	0	10	9	19	3	10	0.0	0.0	5.0	4.5	9.5	1.5	5.0	0
2020 (Note: The 2020 season was played with 17 home-and-away matches per team (down from 22) and 16-minute quarters with time on (down from 20-minute quarters with time on) due to the impact of the COVID-19 pandemic.)	Geelong	13	6	1	1	52	29	81	17	19	0.2	0.2	8.7	4.8	13.5	2.8	3.2	0
2021	Carlton	8	17	6	6	139	107	246	57	62	0.4	0.4	8.2	6.3	14.5	3.4	3.6	0
2022	Carlton	8	3	0	1	10	14	24	5	5	0.0	0.3	3.3	4.7	8.0	1.7	1.7	0
2023	Carlton	8	12	4	4	77	72	149	28	58	0.3	0.3	6.4	6.0	12.4	2.3	4.8	0
2024	Carlton	8	15	9	4	94	81	175	27	45	0.6	0.3	6.3	5.4	11.7	1.8	3.0	0
2025	Carlton	8	20	11	11	113	124	237	53	76	0.6	0.6	5.7	6.2	11.9	2.7	3.8	0
2026	Carlton	8	2	0	1	6	14	20	1	3	0.0	0.5	3.0	7.0	10.0	0.5	1.5	0
Career			92	36	40	610	540	1150	228	330	0.4	0.4	6.6	5.9	12.5	2.5	3.6	0
