= Kane Farrell =

Australian rules footballer (born 1999)

Personal information
- Nickname: Faz
- Born: 17 March 1999 (age 27)
- Original teams: Castlemaine, Bendigo Pioneers
- Draft: No. 51, 2017 national draft
- Debut: 29 July 2018, Port Adelaide vs. Western Bulldogs, at Mars Stadium
- Height: 182 cm (6 ft 0 in)
- Weight: 77 kg (170 lb)
- Position: Half-Back

Club information
- Current club: Port Adelaide
- Number: 6

Playing career^{1}
Years	Club	Games (Goals)
2018–	Port Adelaide	127 (51)
- ^{1} Playing statistics correct to the end of round 22, 2026.

Kane Farrell (born 17 March 1999) is a professional Australian rules footballer playing for Port Adelaide in the Australian Football League (AFL). He made his debut in round 19 of the 2018 AFL season against the Western Bulldogs at Eureka Stadium, kicking one goal.

Farrell grew up in Castlemaine, Victoria supporting the Geelong Cats. He played junior football with Winters Flat in their under-10s team through to their under-15s team. Farrell then played for Castlemaine Football Club and the Bendigo Pioneers' under-15s, 16s and 18s teams. He represented Vic Country in the 2017 AFL Under 18 Championships, averaging 14 possessions and three marks per game. At the 2017 AFL Draft Combine, Farrell recorded the equal-best time of 8.10 seconds in the agility test and the second-best 20 m (66 ft) sprint with a time of 2.90 seconds. He was drafted by Port Adelaide with their second selection (no. 51 overall) in the 2017 national draft. Farrell inherited number 24 from Jarman Impey.

Farrell was named in Port Adelaide's 2018 AFLX squad. Before his AFL debut, he played 13 matches in the South Australian National Football League, kicking 20 goals. Farrell was named as an emergency for the senior side in the two weeks before his first match. Ahead of his debut, Port Adelaide development coach Aaron Greaves described him as a "lovely left foot" and a "classy finisher". Farrell is also recently looked at a lot in SuperCoach AFL averaging over 100 points at the start of the season.

Farrell's parents are Sue and Stephen Farrell. He has one brother, Brodie Filo, an Australian rules who has played across several stage and regional leagues including AFL, Goulburn Valley Football League, Goulburn Valley Football League, Ovens & Murray Football Netball League footballer, and the Northern Territory Football League. He has won a number of league best and fairest medals in the following competitions - 2015 Bendigo Football League, 2018 Ovens & Murray Football League and the 2015/16, 2019/20 and 2024/25 Nichols Medals in the Northern Territory Football League. Filo is the son of former footballer Derrick Filo.

== Statistics ==
Updated to the end of round 22, 2026.

Legend
G	Goals	K	Kicks	D	Disposals	T	Tackles
B	Behinds	H	Handballs	M	Marks

Season	Team	No.	Games	Totals							Averages (per game)							Votes
Season	Team	No.	Games	G	B	K	H	D	M	T	G	B	K	H	D	M	T	Votes
2018	Port Adelaide	24	5	6	2	35	13	48	15	10	1.2	0.4	7.0	2.6	9.6	3.0	2.0	0
2019	Port Adelaide	24	7	11	3	36	23	59	14	14	1.6	0.4	5.1	3.3	8.4	2.0	2.0	0
2020 (Note: The 2020 season was played with 17 home-and-away matches per team (down from 22) and 16-minute quarters with time on (down from 20-minute quarters with time on) due to the impact of the COVID-19 pandemic.)	Port Adelaide	24	11	6	9	56	46	102	21	30	0.5	0.8	5.1	4.2	9.3	1.9	2.7	1
2021	Port Adelaide	24	10	4	3	67	55	122	23	24	0.4	0.3	6.7	5.5	12.2	2.3	2.4	0
2022	Port Adelaide	24	16	11	6	164	79	243	68	41	0.7	0.4	10.3	4.9	15.2	4.3	2.6	0
2023	Port Adelaide	6	22	2	3	281	79	360	82	42	0.1	0.1	12.8	3.6	16.4	3.7	1.9	0
2024	Port Adelaide	6	22	6	5	322	102	424	109	56	0.3	0.2	14.6	4.6	19.3	5.0	2.5	1
2025	Port Adelaide	6	21	3	6	340	86	426	96	48	0.1	0.3	16.2	4.1	20.3	4.6	2.3	0
2026	Port Adelaide	6	13	2	4	210	41	251	86	25	0.2	0.3	16.2	3.2	19.3	6.6	1.9	0
Career			127	51	41	1511	524	2035	514	290	0.4	0.3	11.9	4.1	16.0	4.0	2.3	2
