= Matt Guelfi =

Australian rules footballer

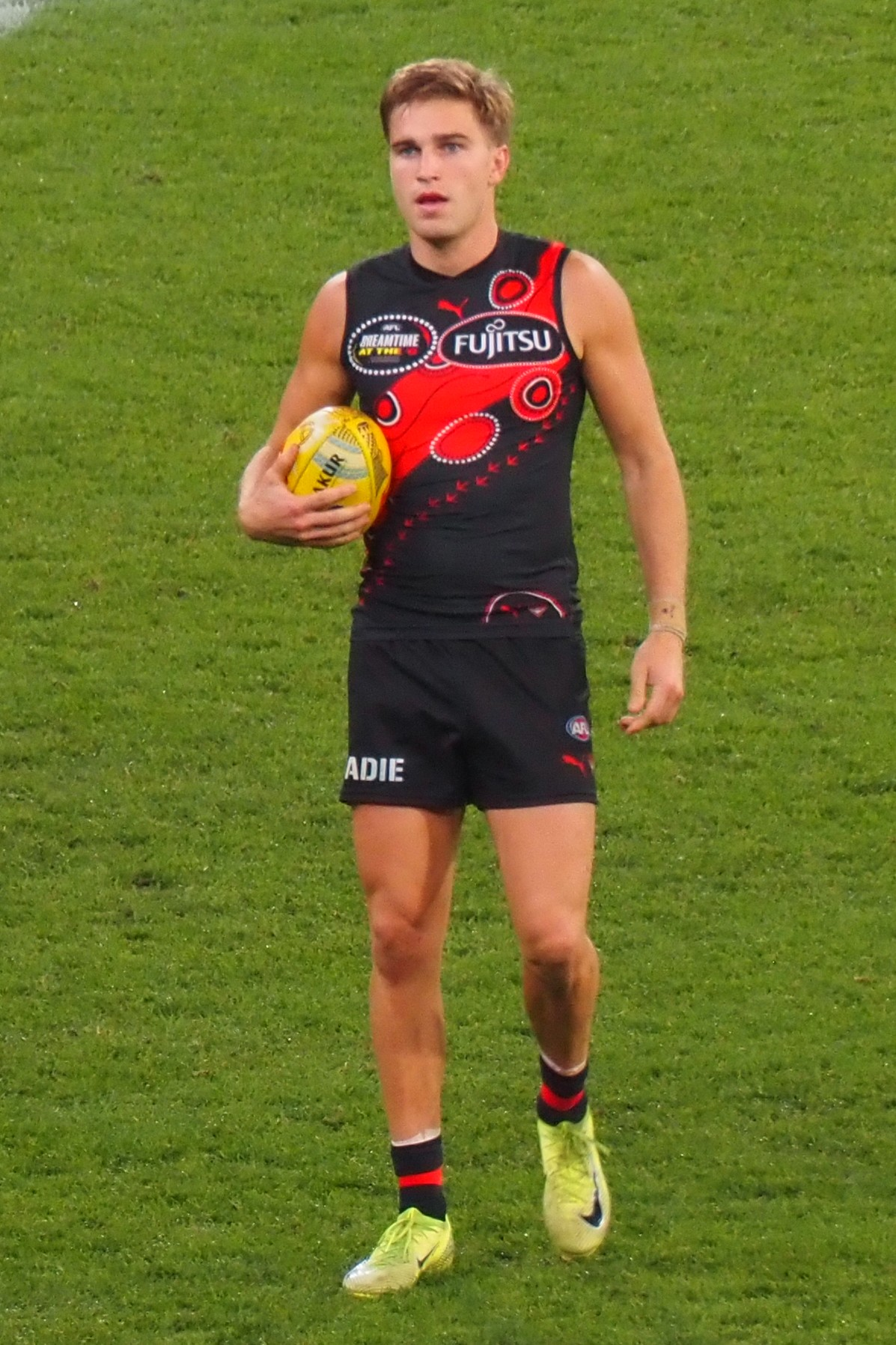
- Guelfi playing for Essendon in 2025

Personal information
- Born: 14 August 1997 (age 29)
- Original team: Claremont (WAFL)
- Draft: No. 76, 2017 national draft
- Debut: Round 4, 2018, Essendon vs. Port Adelaide, at Etihad Stadium
- Height: 184 cm (6 ft 0 in)
- Weight: 84 kg (185 lb)
- Position: Forward / midfielder

Club information
- Current club: Essendon
- Number: 35

Playing career^{1}
Years	Club	Games (Goals)
2018–2026	Essendon	124 (69)
- ^{1} Playing statistics correct to the end of round 22, 2026.

Career highlights
- McCracken Medal 2022

Matt Guelfi (/ˈɡwɛlfiː/ GWEL-fee; born 14 August 1997) is an Australian rules footballer who played for the Essendon Football Club in the Australian Football League (AFL). He originally played for Claremont in the West Australian Football League. After being overlooked in previous drafts, he was drafted by Essendon with their third selection and 76th overall in the 2017 national draft.

== AFL career ==
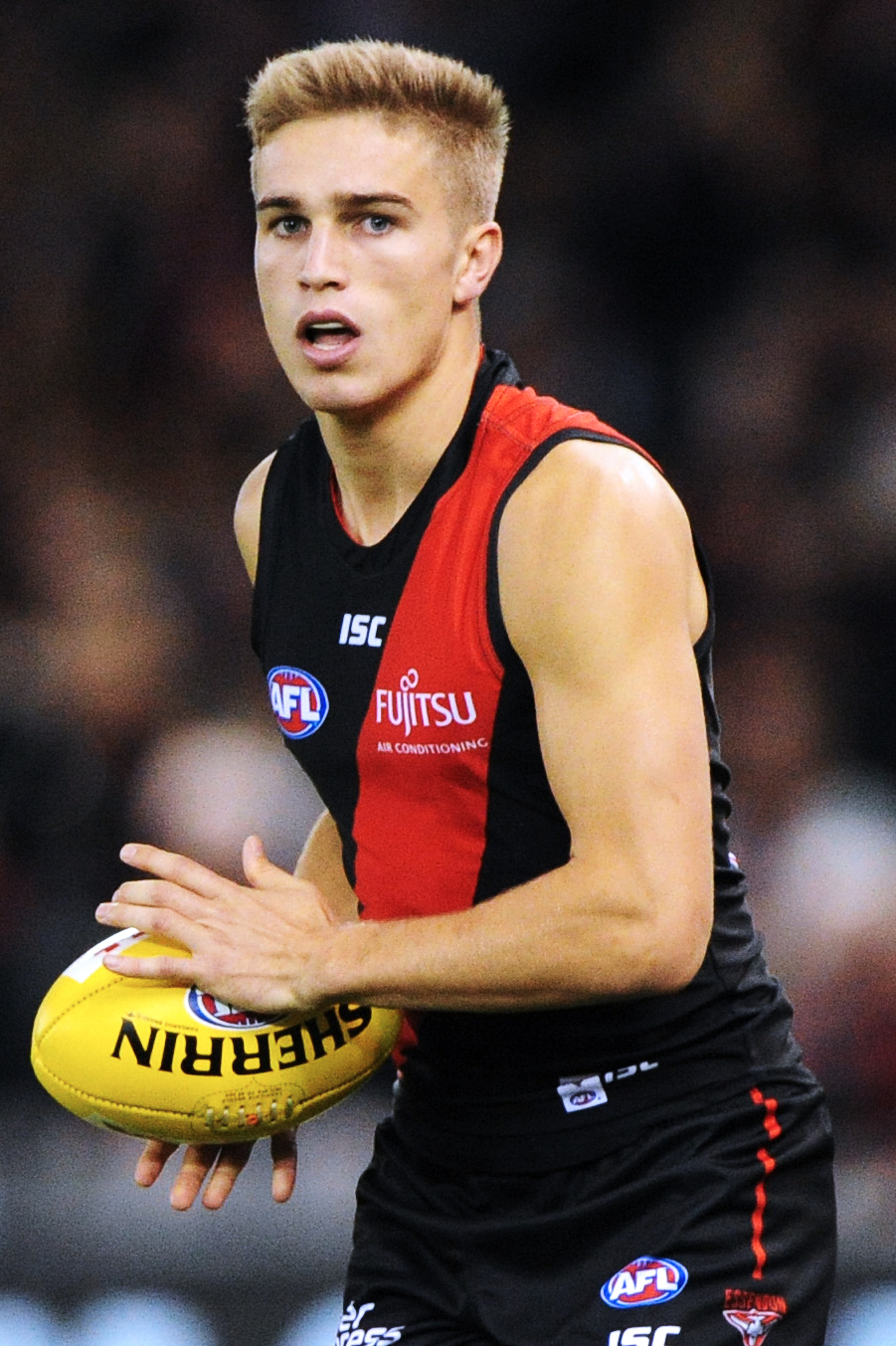
Guelfi playing for Essendon in 2018

He made his AFL debut in the 22-point win against Port Adelaide at Etihad Stadium in Round 4 of the 2018 season.

On 4 September 2019, Guelfi signed a contract extension with Essendon until the end of the 2021 season.

In 2022, Guelfi enjoyed a career-best season, establishing himself as a quality pressure forward and registering a third-place finish in the club's best and fairest. He was also awarded the McCracken Medal as the 'Player's Player'.

Following this, he signed a two-year contract extension, which would keep him at the club until the end of 2024. At the end of 2024, Guelfi signed another 2-year extension to the end of 2026.

== Statistics ==
Updated to the end of round 22, 2026.

Legend
G	Goals	K	Kicks	D	Disposals	T	Tackles
B	Behinds	H	Handballs	M	Marks

Season	Team	No.	Games	Totals							Averages (per game)							Votes
Season	Team	No.	Games	G	B	K	H	D	M	T	G	B	K	H	D	M	T	Votes
2018	Essendon	35	15	5	6	129	98	227	50	46	0.3	0.4	8.6	6.5	15.1	3.3	3.1	0
2019	Essendon	35	17	3	2	136	97	233	55	50	0.2	0.1	8.0	5.7	13.7	3.2	2.9	0
2020 (Note: The 2020 season was played with 17 home-and-away matches per team (down from 22) and 16-minute quarters with time on (down from 20-minute quarters with time on) due to the impact of the COVID-19 pandemic.)	Essendon	35	11	0	0	72	67	139	37	18	0.0	0.0	6.5	6.1	12.6	3.4	1.6	0
2021	Essendon	35	20	6	4	124	112	236	75	54	0.3	0.2	6.2	5.6	11.8	3.8	2.7	0
2022	Essendon	35	20	17	10	141	118	259	77	47	0.9	0.5	7.1	5.9	13.0	3.9	2.4	0
2023	Essendon	35	13	14	4	68	70	138	30	37	1.1	0.3	5.2	5.4	10.6	2.3	2.8	0
2024	Essendon	35	13	15	10	75	80	155	32	46	1.2	0.8	5.8	6.2	11.9	2.5	3.5	0
2025	Essendon	35	12	9	6	55	55	110	21	35	0.8	0.5	4.6	4.6	9.2	1.8	2.9	0
2026	Essendon	35	3	0	1	4	10	14	0	4	0.0	0.3	1.3	3.3	4.7	0.0	1.3	0
Career			124	69	43	804	707	1511	377	337	0.6	0.3	6.5	5.7	12.2	3.0	2.7	0
