= Jack Petruccelle =

Australian rules footballer

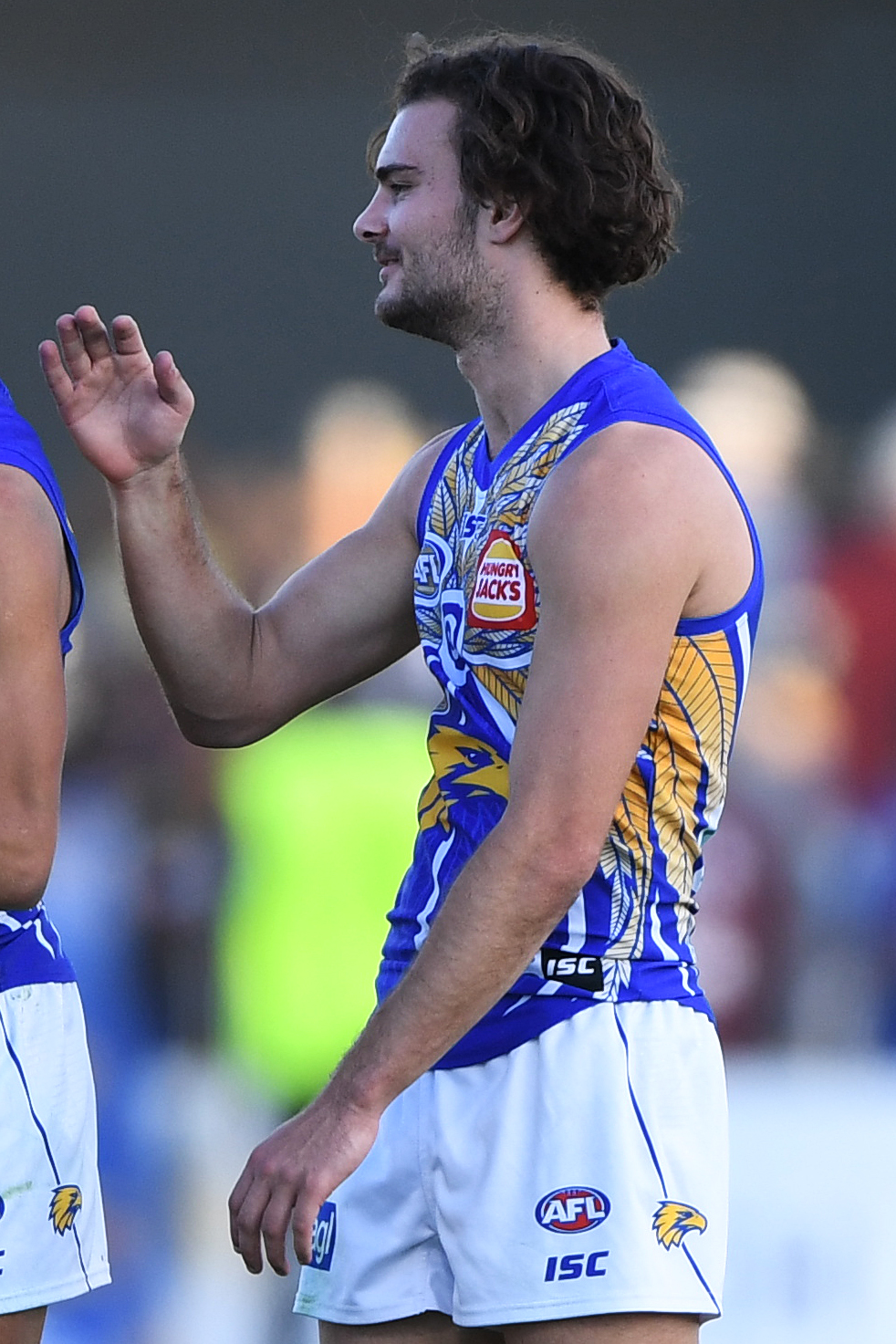
- Petruccelle playing for West Coast in July 2019

Personal information
- Nicknames: Petrol, Rawr
- Born: 12 April 1999 (age 27)
- Original teams: Epping Football Club; Northern Knights (TAC Cup)
- Draft: No. 38, 2017 national draft
- Debut: Round 6, 2018, West Coast vs. Fremantle, at Optus Stadium
- Height: 185 cm (6 ft 1 in)
- Weight: 80 kg (176 lb)
- Position: Forward

Playing career
Years	Club	Games (Goals)
2018–2025	West Coast	90 (71) the 2025 season

Career highlights
- AFL Rising Star nominee: 2019

Jack Petruccelle (born 12 April 1999) is a professional Australian rules footballer who last played for the West Coast Eagles in the Australian Football League (AFL).

Petruccelle attended Marymede Catholic College. He was recruited by West Coast with their fifth selection and thirty-eighth overall in the 2017 national draft, after recording the fastest 20-metre sprint at the AFL Draft Combine with a time of 2.87 seconds. He has been described as a 'line-breaking, high-leaping runner'. He made his AFL debut in the eight point win against Fremantle at Optus Stadium in round six of the 2018 AFL season. In May 2018, Petruccelle signed a two-year contract extension with West Coast, tying him to the club until 2020. Petruccelle received a 2019 AFL Rising Star nomination in round five of the 2019 AFL season, kicking five goals against Port Adelaide.

At the end of the 2025 AFL season, Petruccelle was delisted by West Coast after 8 seasons at the club, having played 90 AFL matches.

== Statistics ==
Legend
G	Goals	K	Kicks	D	Disposals	T	Tackles
B	Behinds	H	Handballs	M	Marks

Season	Team	No.	Games	Totals							Averages (per game)							Votes
Season	Team	No.	Games	G	B	K	H	D	M	T	G	B	K	H	D	M	T	Votes
2018	West Coast	21	3	2	0	7	9	16	3	3	0.7	0.0	2.3	3.0	5.3	1.0	1.0	0
2019	West Coast	21	20	21	15	143	60	203	70	38	1.1	0.8	7.2	3.0	10.2	3.5	1.9	1
2020 (Note: The 2020 season was played with 17 home-and-away matches per team (down from 22) and 16-minute quarters with time on (down from 20-minute quarters with time on) due to the impact of the COVID-19 pandemic.)	West Coast	21	6	2	5	22	20	42	9	7	0.3	0.8	3.7	3.3	7.0	1.5	1.2	0
2021	West Coast	21	17	16	8	108	69	177	59	27	0.9	0.5	6.4	4.1	10.4	3.5	1.6	0
2022	West Coast	21	8	8	8	61	20	81	30	18	1.0	1.0	7.6	2.5	10.1	3.8	2.3	0
2023	West Coast	21	18	10	7	114	108	222	46	55	0.6	0.4	6.3	6.0	12.3	2.6	3.1	0
2024	West Coast	21	16	11	10	107	64	171	49	34	0.7	0.6	6.7	4.0	10.7	3.1	2.1	0
2025	West Coast	21	2	1	0	5	2	7	3	3	0.5	0.0	2.5	1.0	3.5	1.5	1.5	0
Career			90	71	53	567	352	919	269	185	0.8	0.6	6.3	3.9	10.2	3.0	2.1	1
