= Tom Murphy (footballer, born 1998) =

Australian rules footballer

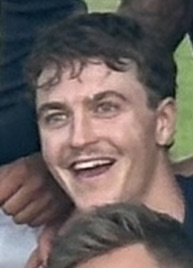
- Murphy in 2025

Personal information
- Full name: Thomas Murphy
- Nickname: Murph
- Born: 19 January 1998 (age 28)
- Original team: Dandenong Stingrays
- Draft: 4, 2017 rookie draft
- Debut: 3 June 2018, North Melbourne vs. Brisbane Lions, at Etihad Stadium
- Height: 189 cm (6 ft 2 in)
- Weight: 82 kg (181 lb)
- Position: Defender

Club information
- Current club: North Melbourne
- Number: 40

Playing career^{1}
Years	Club	Games (Goals)
2018–2020	North Melbourne	6 (1)
- ^{1} Playing statistics correct to the end of 2018.

Thomas Murphy is an Australian rules footballer who currently plays for the Frankston Football Club in the Victorian Football League (VFL). He previously played for North Melbourne in the Australian Football League (AFL).

Murphy made his AFL debut in round 12, 2018, against the Brisbane Lions at Docklands Stadium, as a late replacement for Jarrad Waite.

He originally played for the Dandenong Stingrays in the TAC Cup. He trained with North Melbourne's Victorian Football League squad before he was drafted by North Melbourne with pick 4 in the 2017 rookie draft. Recruiting manager Mark Finnigan said that Murphy was selected for his penetrating kick and mix of speed and endurance. Murphy was delisted by North Melbourne at the end of the 2020 AFL season after a mass delisting by North Melbourne which saw 11 players cut from the team's list.
