= Ryley Stoddart =

Australian rules footballer

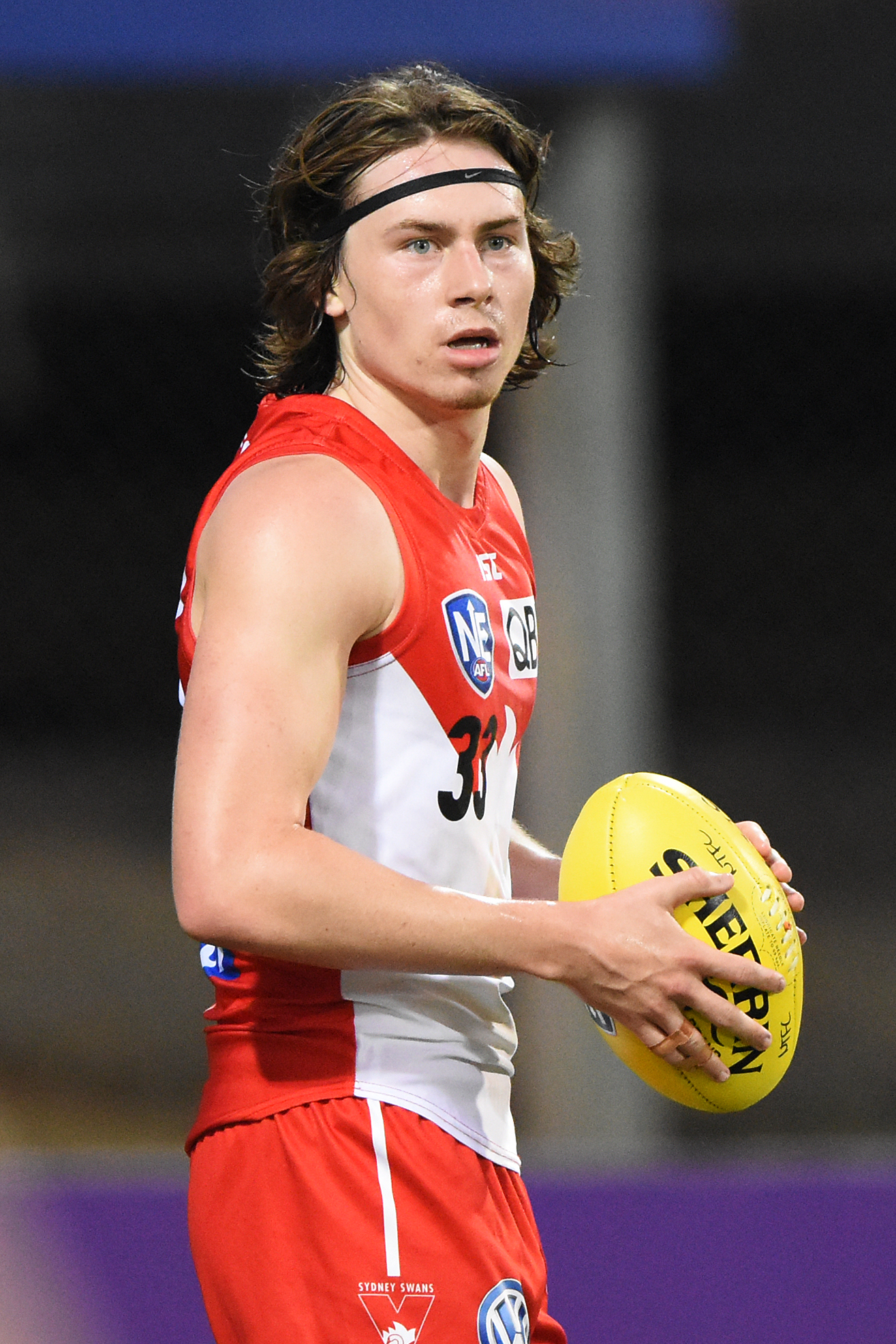

Personal information
- Full name: Ryley Stoddart
- Born: 15 October 1999 (age 27)
- Original team: Eastern Ranges (TAC Cup)
- Draft: No. 53, 2017 national draft
- Height: 186 cm (6 ft 1 in)
- Weight: 73 kg (161 lb)
- Position: Half-back flank

Playing career^{1}
Years	Club	Games (Goals)
2018–2020	Sydney	6 (1)
- ^{1} Playing statistics correct to the end of 2020.

Ryley Stoddart (born 15 October 1999) is a professional Australian rules footballer playing for the Sydney Swans in the Australian Football League (AFL). He is a small defender. He made his debut in round 10, 2018 against the Brisbane Lions at the Gabba.

Stoddart originally played for the Eastern Ranges in the TAC Cup. He recorded the second-best running vertical leap at the AFL Draft Combine, at 98 centimetres (39 in). Stoddart was drafted by Sydney with pick 53 in the 2017 AFL draft, and wears number 33. He was touted as a possible round one debutant by Swans captain Josh Kennedy. However, he was overlooked and later injured his back in a practice match against the GWS Giants. Stoddart signed a one-year contract with the club, tying him to the Swans until 2020. Stoddart was delisted at the conclusion of the 2020 AFL season after playing just six games for Sydney.

Stoddart signed with the Carlton reserves in 2021.
