= Mitch Crowden =

Australian rules footballer

Personal information
- Full name: Mitchell Jai Crowden
- Born: 28 April 1999 (age 27); Mount Barker, South Australia
- Original teams: Meadows Football Club, Sturt (SANFL)
- Draft: No. 59, 2017 national draft
- Height: 174 cm (5 ft 9 in)
- Weight: 84 kg (185 lb)
- Position: Midfielder / forward

Club information
- Current club: Fremantle
- Number: 12

Playing career^{1}
Years	Club	Games (Goals)
2018–2022	Fremantle	40 (15)
2023–2024	East Perth	37 (22)
2025–	Sturt	5 (1)
- ^{1} Playing statistics correct to the end of round 7, 2025.

Mitchell Jai Crowden (born 28 April 1999) is a professional Australian rules footballer who played for the Fremantle Football Club in the Australian Football League (AFL).

== Early career ==
Originally from Meadows in the Adelaide Hills, Crowden played for Sturt in the South Australian National Football League (SANFL), playing in both their 2017 reserves and colts premiership teams. After testing very well at the South Australian draft combine, where he finished in the top 5 in all six categories, he was then selected by Fremantle with their fourth selection, fifty ninth overall, in the 2017 AFL national draft.

== AFL career ==
Crowden made his AFL debut for Fremantle in the second round of the 2018 AFL season. Crowden signed a two-year contract extension in March 2018 tying him to the club until the end of the 2021 season. Following the conclusion of the 2022 AFL season Mitch was delisted by Fremantle.

== Statistics ==
Statistics are correct to the end of round 10, 2022

Legend
G	Goals	K	Kicks	D	Disposals	T	Tackles
B	Behinds	H	Handballs	M	Marks

Season	Team	No.	Games	Totals							Averages (per game)						
Season	Team	No.	Games	G	B	K	H	D	M	T	G	B	K	H	D	M	T
2018	Fremantle	12	9	1	2	38	59	97	21	29	0.1	0.2	4.2	6.6	10.8	2.3	3.2
2019	Fremantle	12	5	3	2	27	33	60	8	24	0.6	0.4	5.4	6.6	12.0	1.6	4.8
2020 (Note: The 2020 season was played with 17 home-and-away matches per team (down from 22) and 16-minute quarters with time on (down from 20-minute quarters with time on) due to the impact of the COVID-19 pandemic.)	Fremantle	12	10	6	1	50	34	84	15	47	0.6	0.1	5.0	3.4	8.4	1.5	4.7
2021	Fremantle	12	16	5	7	70	97	167	34	29	0.3	0.4	4.4	6.1	10.4	2.1	1.8
2022	Fremantle	12	0	–	–	–	–	–	–	–	–	–	–	–	–	–	–
Career			40	15	12	185	223	408	78	129	0.4	0.3	4.6	5.6	10.2	2.0	3.2
