= Lindsay Thomas (footballer, born 1988) =

Australian rules footballer

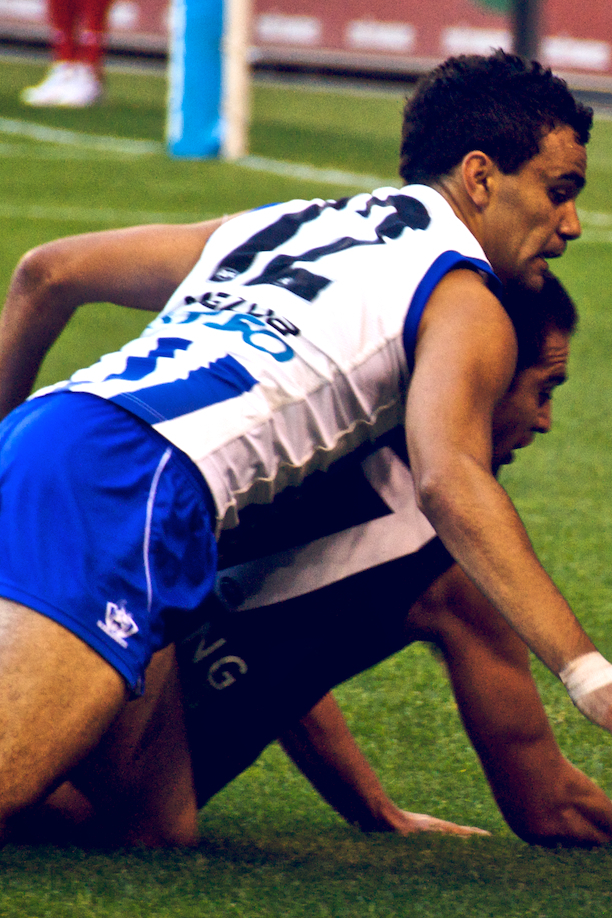
- Thomas playing for North Melbourne in 2011

Personal information
- Born: 29 February 1988 (age 38); Port Lincoln, Australia
- Original team: Port Adelaide (SANFL)
- Draft: No. 53, 2006 national draft No. 12, 2017 rookie draft
- Height: 183 cm (6 ft 0 in)
- Weight: 84 kg (185 lb)
- Position: Forward

Playing career^{1}
Years	Club	Games (Goals)
2007–2017	North Melbourne	205 (325)
2018	Port Adelaide	7 (4)
Total		212 (329)

Representative team honours^{2}
Years	Team	Games (Goals)
2009	Indigenous All-Stars	1
- ^{1} Playing statistics correct to the end of 2018.^{2} Representative statistics correct as of 2009.

Career highlights
- 2× North Melbourne leading goalkicker: 2010, 2013

Lindsay Thomas (born 29 February 1988) is a former professional Australian rules footballer who played for North Melbourne and Port Adelaide in the Australian Football League (AFL).

== AFL career ==
Drafted by the Kangaroos in the fourth round of the 2006 AFL draft from the Port Adelaide Magpies, Thomas made impressive performance by kicking four goals in his first pre-season game against Collingwood in the NAB Cup at Carrara Oval.

Thomas made his AFL debut in Round 1 of the 2007 season, scoring no goals but five behinds in a loss against Collingwood.

In 2010 Thomas led North Melbourne's goalkicking with 29 goals which included 7 against Carlton in Round 12.

The 2011 season was not a successful season for Thomas. He struggled badly with inaccuracy at goal and was at one stage dropped from the senior side. He finished the season with 21 goals and 36 behinds.

In 2012, Thomas' accuracy improved greatly and he kicked 38.19 for the season. 38 goals for a season was his highest so far. He played 19 games for the year, and was held goalless in only 3 of them. He played his 100th game in Round 12, 2012, against Gold Coast. In September 2012, he signed a two-year deal with the club until the end of 2014.

In 2013, Thomas had a career-best season, slotting 53 goals. He also finished seventh in the Coleman Medal, the highest position for a small forward that year.

In the 2014 season Thomas he finished with 45 goals and played in 23 games. He continued to play well in 2015 and 2016 and kicked 34 and 37 goals in the seasons respectfully and played in nearly all games.

Thomas was delisted by North Melbourne at the end of the 2017 season. Port Adelaide flagged their interest in him following his delisting and then drafted him in the 2017 AFL rookie draft.

Thomas made his debut for Port Adelaide in round 5 of the 2018 season, kicking one goal in a 34 point loss to Geelong.
