= Harrison Petty =

Australian rules footballer

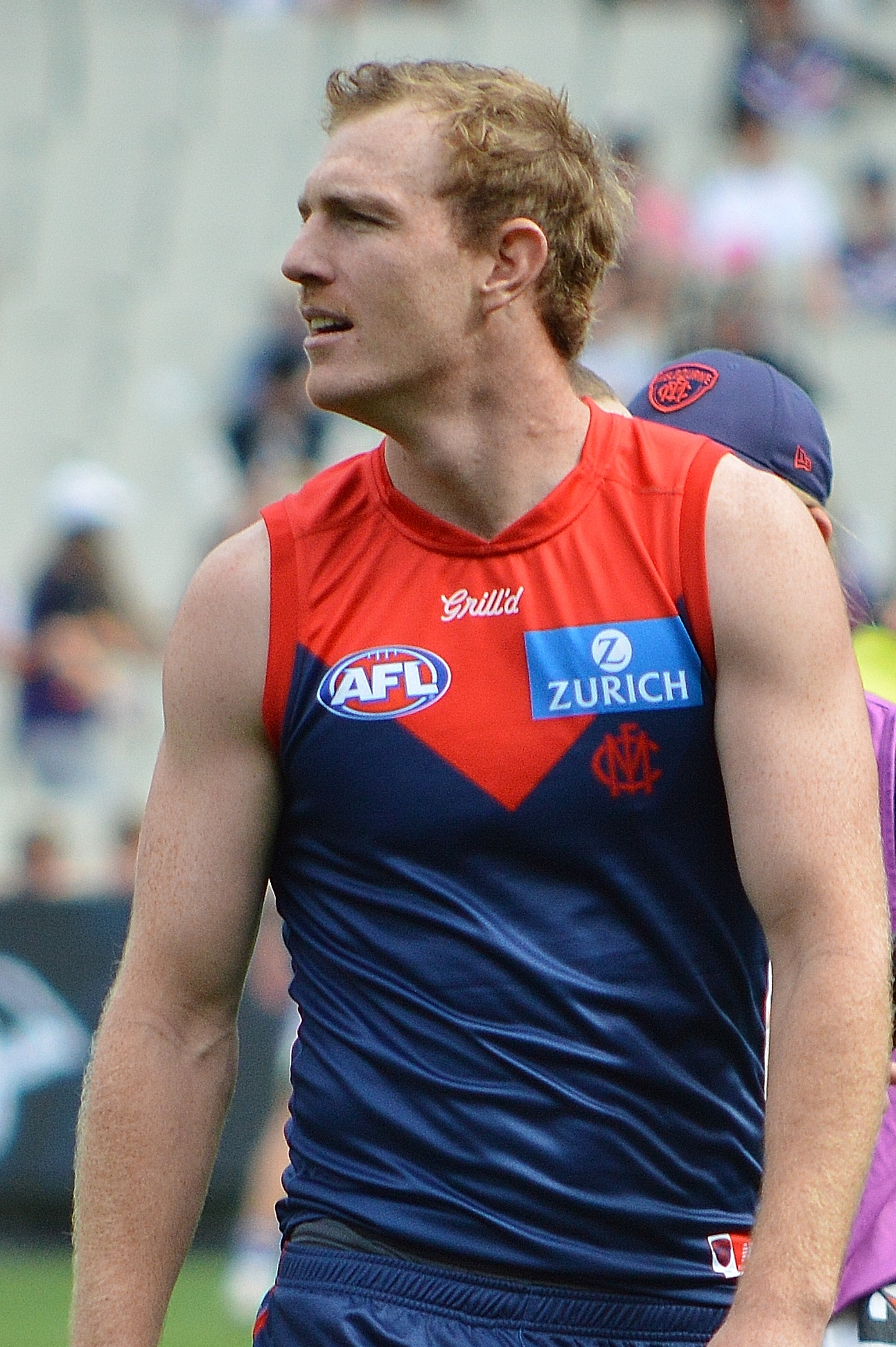
- Petty in April 2025

Personal information
- Born: 12 November 1999 (age 26); Wudinna, South Australia, Australia
- Original team: Norwood (SANFL)
- Draft: No. 37, 2017 national draft
- Debut: Round 15, 2018, Melbourne vs. St Kilda, at MCG
- Height: 197 cm (6 ft 6 in)
- Weight: 90 kg (198 lb)
- Position: Key defender/Key forward

Club information
- Current club: Melbourne
- Number: 35

Playing career^{1}
Years	Club	Games (Goals)
2018–	Melbourne	118 (68)
- ^{1} Playing statistics correct to the end of round 22, 2026.

Career highlights
- AFL premiership player: 2021; Harold Ball Memorial Trophy: 2019

Harrison Petty (born 12 November 1999) is a professional Australian rules footballer playing for the Melbourne Football Club in the Australian Football League (AFL). He was drafted by Melbourne with their third selection and thirty-seventh overall in the 2017 national draft. He made his debut in the two point loss to St Kilda at the Melbourne Cricket Ground in round fifteen of the 2018 season.

== Early football ==
Petty played as a key position defender for South Australia and was MVP and an All-Australian in the 2017 Under 18 carnival. Petty then played Under 19s and Reserves with Norwood before being drafted.

== AFL career ==
Petty was taken with pick 37 in the 2017 national draft and appeared in one game in the 2018 AFL season, and spent the rest of the year developing in the VFL with Casey Demons. Petty signed a 2 year contract extension to keep him at the demons until 2020.

Petty started the 2019 AFL season in defense but was shifted to the forward line for the first time in his career. He kicked three goals in his first game forward, and three more in the next four weeks before injury kept him out of the last two games.

After recovering from a groin injury, Petty started the 2021 AFL season in Melbourne's reserves side, before being recalled after a season-ending knee injury to Adam Tomlinson. Petty impressed for the remainder of the year, playing a key role in Melbourne defence. He played on key forwards such as Josh Bruce, Eric Hipwood and Brody Mihocek and was responbile as a lockdown defender that allowed for Steven May and Jake Lever to intercept and attack on the rebound. During round 17 against top-four placed Port Adelaide, Petty was able to showcase his own offensive intercepting abilities. Playing on both Todd Marshall and Mitch Georgiades, Petty finished the game with a career-high eight intercepts. Petty ended his season playing in Melbourne's 2021 AFL Grand Final win.

His 2022 season was delayed by a calf injury, not returning to the side until round 5. From there he was a key pillar in the league's best backline, holding his spot through to the end of the season. In round 23 an incident involving Brisbane captain Dayne Zorko was investigated by the AFL after Petty was left in tears at The Gabba. An emotional Petty was surrounded by teammates at three-quarter time after what Melbourne coach Simon Goodwin described as an "inappropriate" comment about a family member.

After starting the 2023 AFL season in defence, he was used as a forward again, before a foot injury in the round 9 game against Hawthorn cost him several weeks. He went forward again in round 20 and kicked a career best six goals against Richmond, before another foot injury the following week ended his season.

Petty returned to the forward line early in 2024 but struggled for goals, kicking just nine in 20 games.

In early 2025, Petty returned to defence but was soon required in Melbourne's struggling forward line and ended the season with a career high 20 goals.

In round 2 of 2026, Dockers forward Patrick Voss came under scrutiny for mocking Petty's bald spot. Voss was fined a reduced $1000 due to an early plea agreement, and received criticism from AFL legends, Nick Riewoldt & Max Gawn.

== Statistics ==
Updated to the end of round 22, 2026.

Legend
G	Goals	K	Kicks	D	Disposals	T	Tackles
B	Behinds	H	Handballs	M	Marks
#	Played in that season's premiership team

Season	Team	No.	Games	Totals							Averages (per game)							Votes
Season	Team	No.	Games	G	B	K	H	D	M	T	G	B	K	H	D	M	T	Votes
2018	Melbourne	35	1	0	0	7	4	11	4	2	0.0	0.0	7.0	4.0	11.0	4.0	2.0	0
2019	Melbourne	35	10	6	5	55	38	93	43	21	0.6	0.5	5.5	3.8	9.3	4.3	2.1	0
2020 (Note: The 2020 season was played with 17 home-and-away matches per team (down from 22) and 16-minute quarters with time on (down from 20-minute quarters with time on) due to the impact of the COVID-19 pandemic.)	Melbourne	35	0	—	—	—	—	—	—	—	—	—	—	—	—	—	—	0
2021^{#}	Melbourne	35	19	0	0	107	54	161	68	31	0.0	0.0	5.6	2.8	8.5	3.6	1.6	0
2022	Melbourne	35	18	1	0	111	80	191	70	41	0.1	0.0	6.2	4.4	10.6	3.9	2.3	0
2023 (Note: 2023 statistics include one game in which Petty was substituted out of the game due to injury (round 9) and was replaced by James Jordon.)	Melbourne	35	14	12	1	78	64	142	64	31	0.9	0.1	5.6	4.6	10.1	4.6	2.2	2
2024	Melbourne	35	20	9	15	105	72	177	95	57	0.5	0.8	5.3	3.6	8.9	4.8	2.9	3
2025	Melbourne	35	19	20	10	106	58	164	77	33	1.1	0.5	5.6	3.1	8.6	4.1	1.7	0
2026	Melbourne	35	17	20	9	103	67	170	81	48	1.2	0.5	6.1	3.9	10.0	4.8	2.8	0
Career			118	68	40	672	437	1109	502	264	0.6	0.3	5.7	3.7	9.4	4.3	2.2	5

== Honours and achievements ==
Team

- AFL premiership player (Melbourne): 2021
- McClelland Trophy (Melbourne): 2021

Individual

- Harold Ball Memorial Trophy: 2019
