= Scott Jones (Australian footballer) =

Australian rules footballer

Personal information
- Full name: Scott Jones
- Born: 20 May 1995 (age 31)
- Original team: East Perth (WAFL)
- Draft: No. 75, 2017 national draft
- Height: 205 cm (6 ft 9 in)
- Weight: 115 kg (254 lb)
- Position: Ruckman

Club information
- Current club: East Perth
- Number: 28

Playing career^{1}
Years	Club	Games (Goals)
2018–2019	Fremantle	6 (2)
- ^{1} Playing statistics correct to the end of 2019.

Scott Jones (born 20 May 1995) is an Australian rules football player who played for Fremantle Football Club in the Australian Football League (AFL).

He grew up in Busselton before moving to Perth and playing for East Perth in the West Australian Football League (WAFL). A number of injuries, including a broken leg, broken foot and a dislocated AC joint, affected his junior and early senior career. He was selected by Fremantle with their eighth and last selection, the 75th overall, in the 2017 AFL national draft.

Jones made his AFL debut for Fremantle in the round 11 of the 2018 AFL season, alongside fellow debutant Stefan Giro.

He was delisted by Fremantle at the end of the 2019 AFL season, and returned to play for East Perth in the 2020 WAFL season.
