= Tom De Koning =

Australian rules footballer (born 1999)

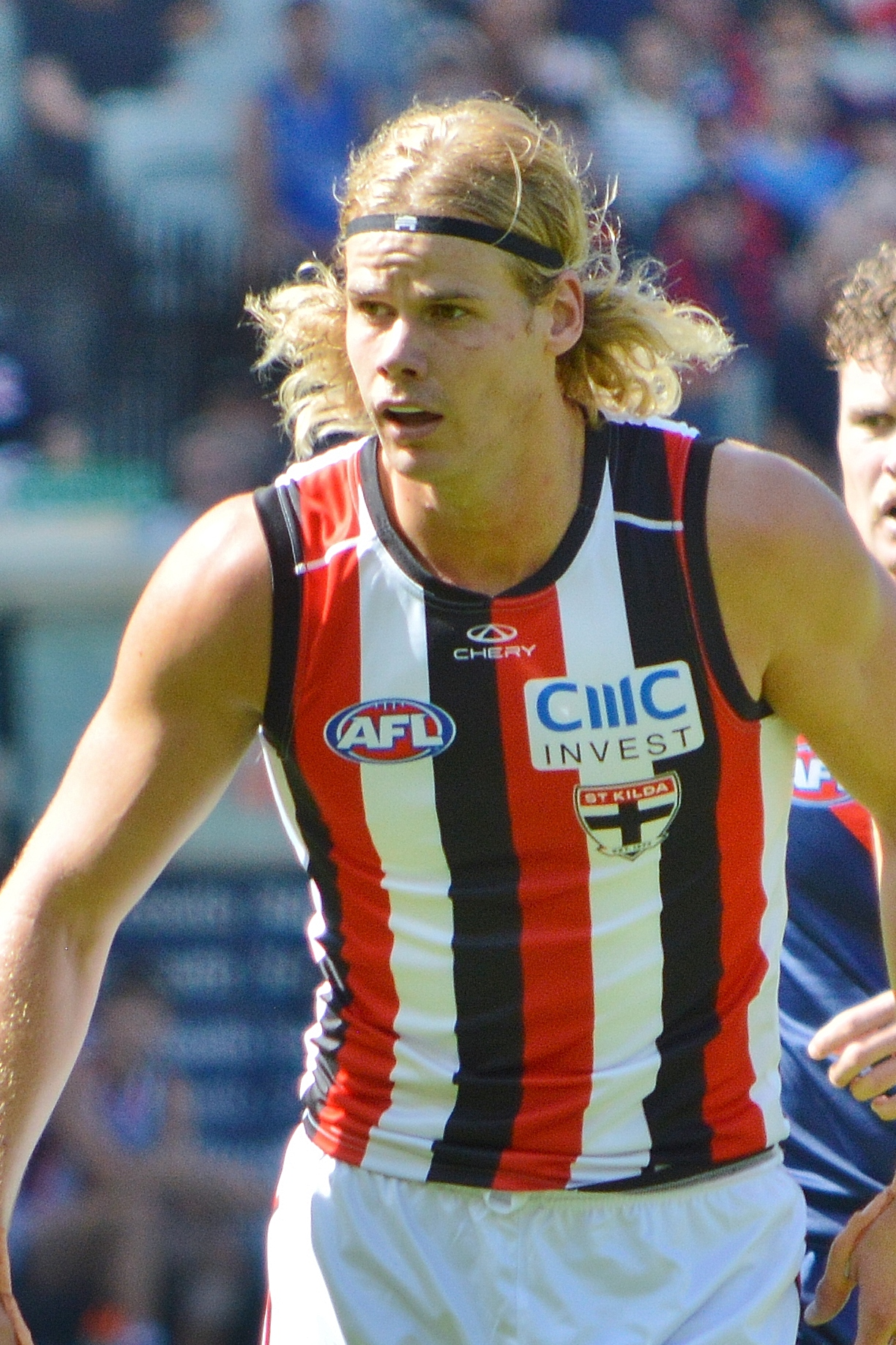
- De Koning with St Kilda in March 2026

Personal information
- Full name: Thomas De Koning
- Nickname: TDK
- Born: 16 July 1999 (age 27)
- Original teams: Dandenong Stingrays (NAB League); Mt Martha (MTPJFL)
- Draft: No. 30, 2017 national draft
- Debut: 19 August 2018, Carlton vs. Western Bulldogs, at Docklands Stadium
- Height: 201 cm (6 ft 7 in)
- Weight: 103 kg (227 lb)
- Position: Ruck

Club information
- Current club: St Kilda
- Number: 21

Playing career^{1}
Years	Club	Games (Goals)
2018–2025	Carlton	100 (36)
2026–	St Kilda	20 (11)
Total		120 (47)
- ^{1} Playing statistics correct to the end of the 2026 season.

Tom De Koning (/ˈkoʊnɪŋ/ KOH-ning; born 16 July 1999) is a professional Australian rules footballer playing for St Kilda Football Club in the Australian Football League (AFL).

== Career ==
Standing at over two metres tall, De Koning has primary played as a ruckman throughout his career. Although not regarded as an elite tap ruckman in terms of hitouts and hitouts-to-advantage statistics, he has been noted for his mobility and athleticism contributing as a ground midfielder, clearance winner and two-way defensive player. Known for his contested marking and aerial ability, he has received multiple Mark of the Week nominations during his career.

=== Junior career ===
De Koning attended Padua College and played junior football for Mt Martha alongside future Carlton teammate Jacob Weitering and St Kilda player Hunter Clark. De Koning joined TAC Cup club Dandenong Stingrays, notably kicking nine goals as a bottom-aged player in a 2016 match against the Northern Knights. He played a total of 19 matches for the Stingrays, as well as four for Vic Country in the 2017 AFL Under 18 Championships, although his 2017 was interrupted after he lacerated his kidney in July in fall in a ruck contest.

=== Carlton Football Club ===
De Koning was drafted to the Australian Football League by Carlton with pick 30 in the 2017 AFL national draft. Prior to his senior debut, he extended his initial two-year contract until the end of 2021, and made his AFL debut in round 22, kicking a goal on debut. He played two senior matches in 2018 and none in an injury-interrupted 2019. De Koning played his first regular senior football in the latter half of the pandemic-interrupted 2020 season, playing seven matches in total, and after the season he signed a further two-year contract extension to the end of 2023. De Koning's became the club's number one ruckman in 2022, and often went into matches either in partnership with tap ruckman Marc Pittonet, or without a recognised backup.

An indifferent start to the 2023 saw De Koning omitted from the senior team for a month; at the same time, the looming end of his contract and perceptions of his potential to ultimately become one of the league's top ruckman-midfielders meant his contract negotiations were widely reported during the year. De Koning was reportedly offered long-term contracts by Sydney (eight years) and Geelong (five years), before re-signing with Carlton in July for a two-year extension to the end of 2025. His form improved upon his return to the senior team later in the year. During the 2023 semi-final against Melbourne, De Koning scored Carlton's first two goals late in the first quarter in quick succession; in response, British singer Robbie Williams, a Carlton fan, recorded himself singing "De Koning's in the Air" to the tune of John Paul Young's Love Is in the Air. The video went viral as De Koning became a cult hero at his club.

Over the next two years, De Koning had phases of both dominant and inconsistent form: at times through mid 2024 and early 2025 commentators considered him in All-Australian form as a dominating ruckman-midfielder, while at other times his form was middling. He finished seventh in the Carlton best and fairest in 2024, then sixth in 2025, which were his best finishes in his time with the club. In 2025, with his short contract extension set to expire and De Koning eligible for restricted free agency, his playing contract was again frequently discussed by the media during the season. It had been widely reported that he had been offered and was likely to accept a high-priced, long-term deal with St Kilda from 2026 which Carlton would not match. De Koning played a career-high 22 matches for Carlton during the 2025 season, playing his 100th career match in the final round.

=== St Kilda Football Club ===
De Koning's move to St Kilda was confirmed on the first day of the 2025 free agency period.

== Personal life ==
De Koning is the son of former Footscray player Terry De Koning. He is the eighth eldest in a blended family of ten children, and his younger brother is Geelong footballer Sam De Koning. His Dutch grandfather Martin was a migrant to Australia.

== Statistics ==
Updated to the end of round 22, 2026.

Legend
G	Goals	K	Kicks	D	Disposals	T	Tackles
B	Behinds	H	Handballs	M	Marks	H/O	Hit-outs

Season	Team	No.	Games	Totals								Averages (per game)								Votes
Season	Team	No.	Games	G	B	K	H	D	M	T	H/O	G	B	K	H	D	M	T	H/O	Votes
2018	Carlton	12	2	1	0	6	10	16	6	4	3	0.5	0.0	3.0	5.0	8.0	3.0	2.0	1.5	0
2019	Carlton	12	0	—	—	—	—	—	—	—	—	—	—	—	—	—	—	—	—	0
2020 (Note: The 2020 season was played with 17 home-and-away matches per team (down from 22) and 16-minute quarters with time on (down from 20-minute quarters with time on) due to the impact of the COVID-19 pandemic.)	Carlton	12	7	0	2	26	28	54	10	16	88	0.0	0.3	3.7	4.0	7.7	1.4	2.3	12.6	0
2021	Carlton	12	13	7	4	81	42	123	40	27	219	0.5	0.3	6.2	3.2	9.5	3.1	2.1	16.8	0
2022	Carlton	12	19	4	6	120	87	207	49	46	326	0.2	0.3	6.3	4.6	10.9	2.6	2.4	17.2	0
2023	Carlton	12	19	9	7	114	114	228	54	47	337	0.5	0.4	6.0	6.0	12.0	2.8	2.5	17.7	0
2024	Carlton	12	18	9	10	154	138	292	59	61	359	0.5	0.6	8.6	7.7	16.2	3.3	3.4	19.9	1
2025	Carlton	12	22	6	10	194	187	381	72	51	512	0.3	0.5	8.8	8.5	17.3	3.3	2.3	23.3	7
2026	St Kilda	21	18	11	9	115	117	232	57	27	325	0.6	0.5	6.4	6.5	12.9	3.2	1.5	18.1	0
Career			118	47	48	810	723	1533	347	279	2169	0.4	0.4	6.9	6.1	13.0	2.9	2.4	18.4	8
