= Patrick Wilson (footballer) =

Australian rules footballer

Personal information
- Born: 11 December 1994 (age 31)
- Original team: Sturt (SANFL)
- Draft: No. 17, 2018 rookie draft
- Debut: Round 13, 2018, Adelaide vs. Hawthorn, at MCG
- Height: 190 cm (6 ft 3 in)
- Weight: 92 kg (203 lb)
- Position: Midfielder

Club information
- Current club: Adelaide
- Number: 31

Playing career
Years	Club	Games (Goals)
2018–2020	Adelaide	2 (0)

Patrick Wilson (born 11 December 1994) is a professional Australian rules footballer who played for the Adelaide Football Club in the Australian Football League (AFL). He made his debut in round 13 of the 2018 season against Hawthorn at the Melbourne Cricket Ground.

Wilson originally played for South Australian National Football League (SANFL) club Sturt and made his senior debut in the 2014 season. He left professional football for a year in 2015 after a series of injuries and inconsistent form. Reflecting on his decision, Wilson said that it helped build his resilience and gave him good life experience. On return, Wilson suffered a shoulder injury mid-season that required a reconstruction and missed Sturt's 2016 premiership.

In 2017, encouraged by senior coach Martin Mattner, he shifted from defence to a midfield role. Wilson said that the change suited his physical style. He played in Sturt's 2017 premiership and was selected in the 2017 SANFL Team of the Year. Wilson was drafted by Adelaide with pick 17 in the 2018 AFL rookie draft, their first selection. Wilson was delisted at the conclusion of the 2020 AFL season, after playing just two games with the Crows.
