= Dom Barry =

Australian rules footballer

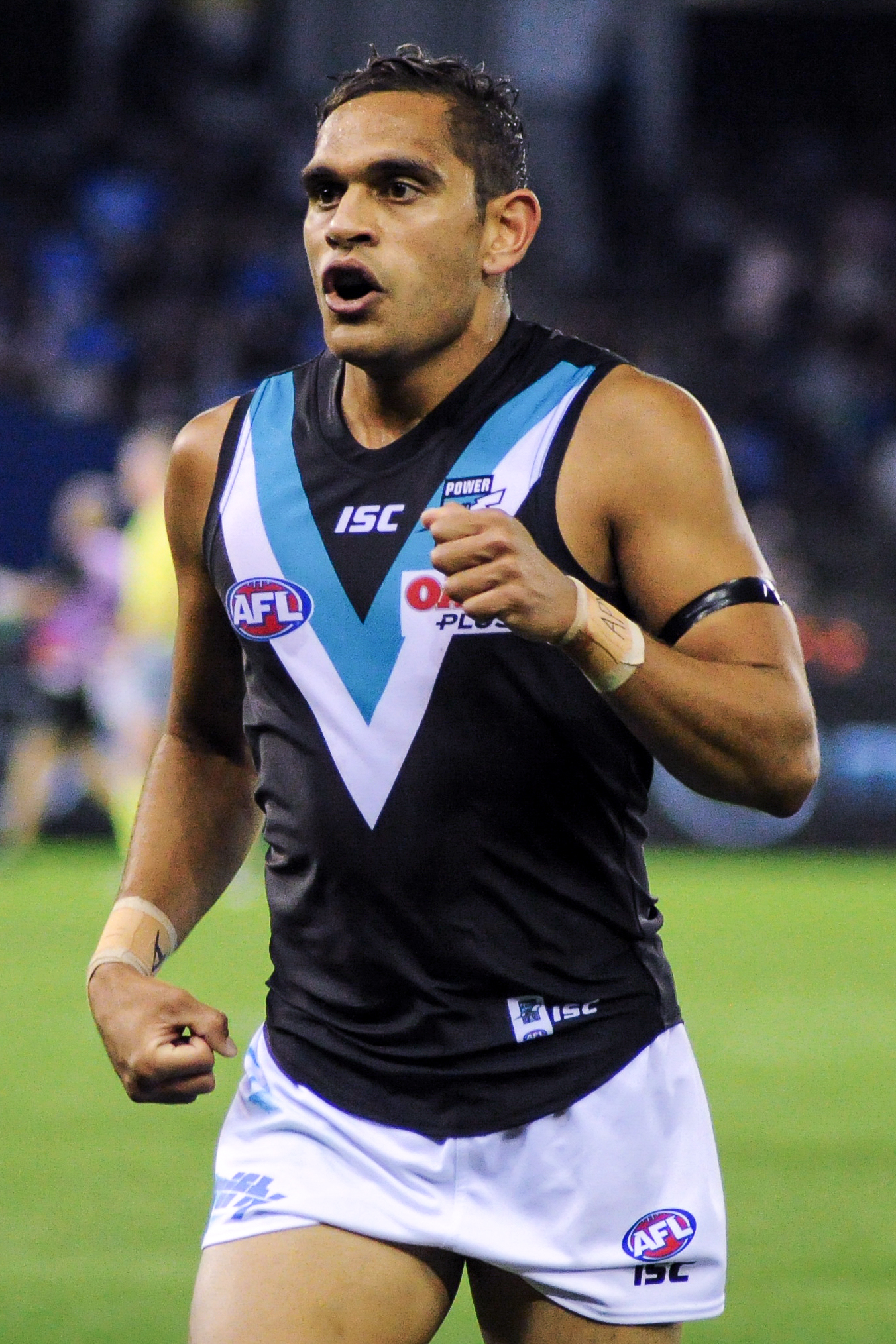
- Barry playing for Port Adelaide in June 2018

Personal information
- Full name: Dominic Barry
- Born: 7 March 1994 (age 32)
- Original team: St Patrick's College/North Ballarat Rebels
- Draft: No. 61, 2017 national draft
- Height: 183 cm (6 ft 0 in)
- Weight: 70 kg (154 lb)
- Position: Midfielder

Playing career^{1}
Years	Club	Games (Goals)
2013–2014	Melbourne	5 (0)
2018	Port Adelaide	5 (0)
Total		10 (0)

International team honours^{2}
Years	Team	Games (Goals)
2013	Australia	2 (0)
- ^{1} Playing statistics correct to the end of 2018.^{2} Representative statistics correct as of 2013.

Dominic Barry (born 7 March 1994) is a former professional Australian rules footballer who played for the Melbourne Football Club and the Port Adelaide Football Club in the Australian Football League (AFL).

Barry was initially a Greater Western Sydney recruit as part of their zone recruiting, however, he was on-traded to Melbourne, which saw Melbourne also land Jesse Hogan in exchange for picks 3 and 13 during the 2012 trade period.

At the end of the 2013 season, Barry represented Australia in the 2013 International Rules Series against Ireland, despite having not played an AFL game.

Barry made his AFL debut in round 15, 2014 against the Western Bulldogs. He played five games in 2014 before notifying Melbourne at the start of the pre-season that he had lost the desire to play AFL and would be returning to Central Australia to focus on his family and cultural identity.

In 2016, Barry began playing with Glenelg in the South Australian National Football League (SANFL). He had spent 2015 as a school bus driver and playing local football in Anangu Pitjantjatjara Yankunytjatjara. After one season with Glenelg, Barry nominated for the 2017 AFL draft and was taken by Port Adelaide with selection number 61.

== Statistics ==
Statistics are correct to the end of the 2014 season

Legend
G	Goals	K	Kicks	D	Disposals	T	Tackles
B	Behinds	H	Handballs	M	Marks

Season	Team	No.	Games	Totals							Averages (per game)						
Season	Team	No.	Games	G	B	K	H	D	M	T	G	B	K	H	D	M	T
2014	Melbourne	33	5	—	1	19	19	38	6	7	—	0.2	3.8	3.8	7.6	1.2	1.4
Career			5	0	1	19	19	38	6	7	0.0	0.2	3.8	3.8	7.6	1.2	1.4
