= Alex Morgan (Australian footballer) =

Australian rules footballer

Personal information
- Born: 28 January 1996 (age 30)
- Original team: Forest Hill (Vic)/Waverley Blues (Vic)/Oakleigh Chargers
- Draft: No. 29, 2015 national draft, Essendon
- Debut: 15 July 2018, North Melbourne vs. Sydney Swans, at Docklands Stadium
- Height: 182 cm (6 ft 0 in)
- Weight: 83 kg (183 lb)
- Position: Half-back

Club information
- Current club: North Melbourne
- Number: 21

Playing career^{1}
Years	Club	Games (Goals)
2018	North Melbourne	2 (0)
- ^{1} Playing statistics correct to the end of 2018.

Alex Morgan (born 28 January 1996) is a professional Australian rules footballer who played for the North Melbourne Kangaroos in the Australian Football League (AFL). He made his debut in round 17 of the 2018 season against the Sydney Swans at Docklands Stadium.

Morgan grew up in the Melbourne suburb of Mount Waverley and played junior football at the Waverley Blues Football Club and Forest Hill Football Club. He later joined TAC Cup club Oakleigh Chargers and played in a premiership. Morgan recorded the equal-fastest 20 m (66 ft) sprint at the 2015 AFL Draft Combine with a time of 2.88 seconds.

He was drafted by the Essendon Bombers with pick 29 in the 2015 national draft and wore number 21. A hamstring injury restricted him to nine Victorian Football League (VFL) games in 2016. He played 17 VFL games in 2017, averaging 13 disposals. Morgan was offered a one-year contract with Essendon for 2018, but left to seek more senior opportunities at North Melbourne. He cited the arrival of Adam Saad in the 2017 trade period as a particular reason for his departure; Saad has similar pace and plays the same half-back role as Morgan. "I had to weigh up where I was at after two seasons without playing a game and ... felt that ... North Melbourne was a better fit in a way." Morgan commented. He decided on North Melbourne after talking with coach Brad Scott.

Morgan joined North Melbourne as a delisted free agent on a one-year contract; if certain conditions are met, the deal will be extended by a year. He wears his previous number 21 after Jy Simpkin switched to 12.
