= Nathan Wilson (footballer) =

Australian rules footballer (born 1993)

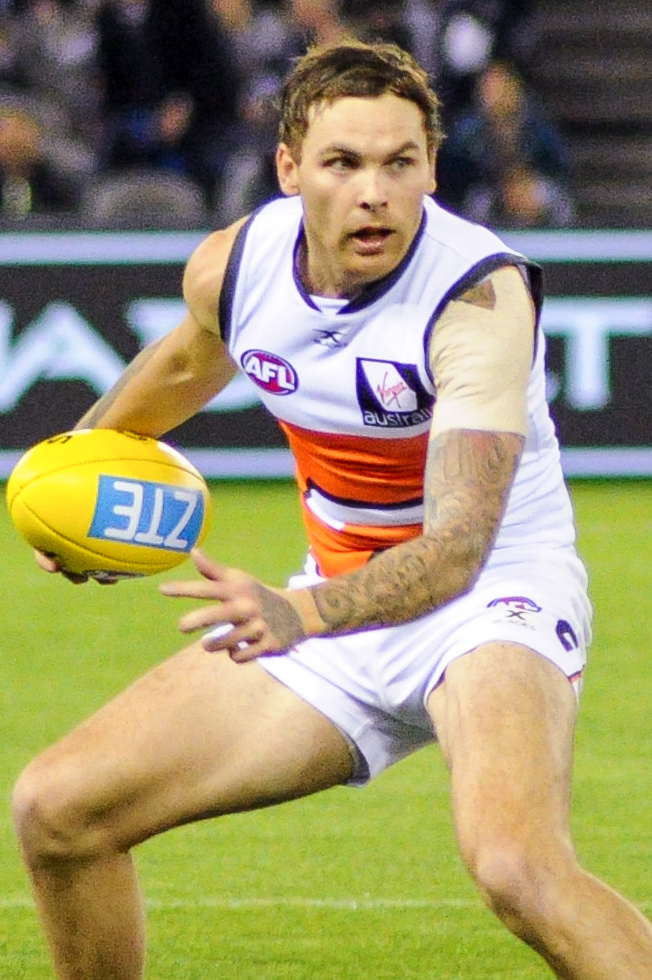
- Wilson playing for Greater Western Sydney in June 2017

Personal information
- Born: 7 January 1993 (age 33)
- Original team: Peel Thunder (WAFL)
- Draft: Underage recruit, Greater Western Sydney
- Height: 185 cm (6 ft 1 in)
- Weight: 83 kg (183 lb)
- Position: Defender

Playing career^{1}
Years	Club	Games (Goals)
2012–2017	Greater Western Sydney	77 (16)
2018–2023	Fremantle	78 (2)
Total		155 (18)
- ^{1} Playing statistics correct to the end of 2023.

Career highlights
- Inaugural Greater Western Sydney player: 2012; WAFL premiership player: 2024; Peel Thunder Leading Goalkicker: 2024

Nathan Wilson (born 7 January 1993) is a professional Australian rules footballer who played for the Fremantle Football Club and the Greater Western Sydney Giants in the Australian Football League (AFL).

== AFL career ==
Wilson was recruited from Peel Thunder by Greater Western Sydney as an underage selection at the age of 17. Wilson spent 2011 playing for GWS in the newly established North East Australian Football League (NEAFL), as preparation for Greater Western Sydney's entrance into the Australian Football League.

Wilson made his debut in round 1 of the 2012 AFL season during Greater Western Sydney's inaugural game against the Sydney Swans at ANZ Stadium kicking a goal on debut. He finished his debut season having played 9 games.

At the end of the 2017 season, he was traded to the Fremantle Football Club.

In April 2023 Wilson was subjected to racial and homophobic abuse on social media, along with teammate Michael Walters, which was investigated by AFL's integrity unit.

At the conclusion of the 2023 AFL season, Wilson along with teammates Travis Colyer and Eric Benning were informed that they would not be offered contracts in 2024, seemingly ending Wilson's football career after 12 years in the AFL.

Wilson continued playing for Peel Thunder during the 2024 WAFL season. Wilson was a key member of the Peel Thunder team that won the 2024 WAFL Premiership, and finished the season as their leading goal-kicker. After a successful professional career spanning almost 15 years in both the AFL and WAFL, he announced his retirement from football on the 16th of October, 2024, stating "It’s been a great one, to play over 150 AFL games is a dream come true and I’m thankful to every Club that has been involved with myself and family. To come back after my AFL career and to win a Premiership, it means a lot and I’m thankful to the Club".

== Statistics ==
Statistics are correct to the end of 2023

Legend
G	Goals	K	Kicks	D	Disposals	T	Tackles
B	Behinds	H	Handballs	M	Marks

Season	Team	No.	Games	Totals							Averages (per game)						
Season	Team	No.	Games	G	B	K	H	D	M	T	G	B	K	H	D	M	T
2012	Greater Western Sydney	16	9	6	3	37	19	56	15	20	0.7	0.3	4.1	2.1	6.2	1.7	2.2
2013	Greater Western Sydney	16	4	0	1	16	7	23	10	12	0.0	0.3	4.0	1.8	5.8	2.5	3.0
2014	Greater Western Sydney	16	6	1	1	51	15	66	21	8	0.2	0.2	8.5	2.5	11.0	3.5	1.3
2015	Greater Western Sydney	16	13	2	2	102	50	152	41	23	0.2	0.2	7.8	3.8	11.7	3.2	1.8
2016	Greater Western Sydney	16	21	3	3	257	97	354	95	29	0.1	0.1	12.2	4.6	16.9	4.5	1.4
2017	Greater Western Sydney	16	24	4	4	329	89	418	101	46	0.2	0.2	13.7	3.7	17.4	4.2	1.9
2018	Fremantle	14	21	1	3	310	79	389	110	23	0.0	0.1	14.8	3.8	18.5	5.2	1.1
2019	Fremantle	14	18	0	3	256	66	322	66	22	0.0	0.2	14.2	3.7	17.9	3.7	1.2
2020 (Note: The 2020 season was played with 17 home-and-away matches per team (down from 22) and 16-minute quarters with time on (down from 20-minute quarters with time on) due to the impact of the COVID-19 pandemic.)	Fremantle	14	15	1	1	153	52	205	50	14	0.1	0.1	10.2	3.5	13.7	3.3	0.9
2021	Fremantle	14	18	0	4	233	71	304	74	18	0.0	0.2	12.9	3.9	16.9	4.1	1.0
2022	Fremantle	14	2	0	0	24	11	35	10	1	0.0	0.0	12.0	5.5	17.5	5.0	0.5
2023	Fremantle	14	4	0	0	44	17	61	22	2	0.0	0.0	11.0	4.3	15.3	5.5	0.5
Career			155	18	25	1812	573	2385	615	218	0.1	0.2	11.7	3.7	15.4	4.0	1.4
