= Logan Austin =

Australian rules footballer

Personal information
- Full name: Logan Austin
- Born: 8 July 1995 (age 31); Canberra, Australian Capital Territory
- Original team: Belconnen
- Draft: No. 69, 2014 national draft
- Height: 194 cm (6 ft 4 in)
- Weight: 86 kg (190 lb)
- Position: Defender

Playing career^{1}
Years	Club	Games (Goals)
2015–2017	Port Adelaide	13 (0)
2018–2020	St Kilda	7 (0)
Total		20 (0)
- ^{1} Playing statistics correct to the end of 2020.

Logan Austin (born 8 July 1995) is a former professional Australian rules footballer who played for the Port Adelaide Football Club and St Kilda Football Club in the Australian Football League (AFL).

Originally from Canberra, he made his AFL debut in round 11 of the 2016 AFL season, playing in defence on recalled Collingwood forward Travis Cloke, and keeping him goalless for the game. At the conclusion of the 2017 AFL season, Austin was traded to St Kilda. Austin was delisted at the conclusion of the 2020 AFL season after just seven games for the Saints.
