= 2026 Carlton Football Club season =

Australian Football League team season

Carlton Football Club
2026 season
- President: Robert Priestley
- Coach: Michael Voss (until round 9), Josh Fraser (from round 10)
- Captain: Patrick Cripps
- Home grounds: Marvel Stadium,Melbourne Cricket Ground (Training and administrative: Ikon Park)
- AFL season: 8th (12–10–1 H&A, 1–1 Finals)

The 2026 Carlton Football Club season is the Carlton Football Club's 163rd season of competition.

It is the club's men's team's 130th season as a member of the Australian Football League. Under senior coach Michael Voss in his fifth season with the club, the team began the season with a 1–8 record, resulting in Voss' departure from the role. Assistant coach Josh Fraser took over, and oversaw a form reversal which saw the team reach the finals in 10th place with a 12–10–1 record, and eventually finish in 8th place after a wildcard final win and elimination final loss.

The club's women's team is contesting its 11th season in the AFL Women's. The club also fielded its men's reserves team in the Victorian Football League and its state level women's team in the VFL Women's.

== Club summary ==
The 2026 AFL season is the 130th season of the VFL/AFL competition since its inception in 1897; and, having competed in every season, it is also be the 130th season contested by the Carlton Football Club. The club is fielding its women's team in the 11th season of the AFL Women's competition, its men's reserves team in its ninth Victorian Football League season, and its VFL women's team in its eighth VFL Women's season.

Carlton's primary home ground was be Marvel Stadium and secondary home ground was the Melbourne Cricket Ground, with the team playing six home games at the former and five at the latter. Traditional home ground Ikon Park continued to serve as the training and administrative base, and as the home ground for AFL Women's and the men's reserves matches.

Car manufacturer Hyundai, which had been a major sponsor of the club continuously since 2008, and Great Southern Bank, which became a major sponsor during the 2021 season, will continue as the club's major sponsors through the 2026 season.

== Senior personnel ==
Robert Priestly continued as club president for his second season in the role. Graham Wright took over from Brian Cook as CEO and served his first season in the role; Wright had joined the club from Collingwood as deputy CEO at the start of 2024 under a succession plan, taking over in August 2025.

Michael Voss began he season in his fifth year as senior coach of the club, and was to be out of contract at the end of the season. Following Voss' departure from the role after round 9, assistant coach Josh Fraser stepped in as caretaker coach; Fraser was in his first year of a second stint at Carlton as an assistant coach, having previously coached with the club between 2016 and 2020, including coaching the Northern Blues VFL team. Following round 23, when Carlton secured its 2026 finals position, Fraser was appointed full time senior coach until the end of 2029.

In addition to Fraser's addition, there were several changes to the assistant coaching panel prior to the season, with Leigh Adams, Jacob Townsend and Ash Close joining, and Damian Truslove returning after a stint elsewhere; development coaches Brad Ebert, Luke Power and Tom Lonergan and assistant coaches Aaron Hamill and Aaron Greaves departed after 2025.

Patrick Cripps continued in his fifth year as sole club captain and seventh year overall (having served as co-captain with Sam Docherty for three years). The number of vice-captains was reduced from three to two to make up the broader leadership group, with Jacob Weitering and Sam Walsh continuing in the role; 2025's third vice captain Charlie Curnow was traded to Sydney and was not replaced.

== Squad for 2026 ==
The following is Carlton's squad for the 2025 season.

Statistics are correct as of end of 2025 season.

Senior List
No.	Player	Hgt (cm)	Date of Birth	Age (end 2025)	AFL Debut	Recruited from	Games (end 2025)	Goals (end 2025)
2	Lachie Cowan	187	1 December 2004	21	2023	Devonport, Tasmania (U18)	38	2
3	Jesse Motlop	180	23 November 2003	22	2022	South Fremantle	63	59
4	Oliver Hollands	183	16 January 2004	21	2023	Murray (U18)	65	11
5	Adam Cerra	187	7 October 1999	26	2018	Eastern (U18), Fremantle	148	39
6	Zac Williams	185	20 September 1994	31	2013	GWS Academy, GWS	174	69
7	Jagga Smith	182	28 January 2006	19	–	Oakleigh (U18)	–	–
8	Lachie Fogarty	180	1 April 1999	26	2018	Western (U18), Geelong	90	36
9	Patrick Cripps (c)	195	18 March 1995	30	2014	East Fremantle	230	127
10	Harry McKay	204	24 December 1997	28	2017	Gippsland (U18)	140	274
11	Mitch McGovern	191	11 October 1994	31	2016	Claremont, Adelaide	145	120
12	Ben Ainsworth	178	10 February 1998	27	2017	Gippsland (U18), Gold Coast	158	137
13	Blake Acres	189	7 October 1995	30	2014	West Perth, St Kilda, Fremantle	187	65
14	Oliver Florent	184	22 July 1998	27	2017	Sandringham (U18), Sydney	184	51
15	Billy Wilson	183	16 June 2005	20	—	Dandenong (U18)	4	0
16	Ben Camporeale	186			–	Glenelg	–	–
17	Brodie Kemp	192	1 May 2001	24	2021	Bendigo (U18)	49	14
18	Sam Walsh (vc)	184	2 July 2000	25	2019	Geelong (U18)	133	47
19	Will Hayward	186	26 October 1998	27	2017	North Adelaide, Sydney	184	229
21	Lucas Camporeale	184			–	Glenelg	3	0
22	Harry O'Farrell	197			–	Calder (U18)	6	1
23	Jacob Weitering (vc)	196	24 November 1997	28	2016	Dandenong (U18)	204	11
24	Nic Newman	187	15 January 1993	32	2017	Frankston, Sydney	134	18
25	Liam Reidy	204	14 June 2000	25	2024	Frankston, Fremantle	3	0
26	Nick Haynes	192	18 May 1992	33	2012	Dandenong (U18)	234	13
27	Marc Pittonet	202	3 June 1996	29	2016	Oakleigh (U18), Hawthorn	80	12
29	George Hewett	185	30 December 1995	30	2016	North Adelaide, Sydney	202	53
30	Jack Ison	190			—	Oakleigh (U18)	–	–
31	Campbell Chesser	186	27 April 2003	22	—	Sandringham (U18)	36	7
33	Lewis Young	201	21 December 1998	27	2017	Sturt, Western Bulldogs	80	9
35	Harry Dean	193			–	Murray (U18)	–	–
37	Jordan Boyd	182	22 September 1998	27	2022	Western (U18), Footscray reserves	38	1
39	Talor Byrne	174			–	GWV (U18)	–	–
40	Hudson O'Keeffe	202	16 December 2004	21	2025	Oakleigh (U18)	5	3
42	Adam Saad	178	23 July 1994	31	2015	Calder (U18), Coburg, Gold Coast, Essendon	216	12
43	Ashton Moir	187	15 April 2005	20	2024	Glenelg	11	12
46	Matthew Cottrell	181	29 February 2000	25	2020	Dandenong (U18)	74	36
Rookie List
No.	Player	Hgt	Date of Birth	Age	Debut	Recruited from	Games	Goals
20	Elijah Hollands	189	25 April 2002	23	2022	Murray (U18)	41	26
28	Harry Charleson	182			–	GWV (U18)	–	–
32	Matt Carroll	188	25 November 2005	20	–	Sandringham (U18)	17	1
34	Rob Monahan	194	29 June 2024	21	—	Kerry	–	–
36	Cooper Lord	184	20 March 2005	20	2024	Sandringham (U18), North Melbourne reserves	23	5
41	Matt Duffy	194	2 January 2004	21	–	Longford GAA	–	–
44	Francis Evans		23 August 2001	24	2021	Calder (U18), Geelong, Port Adelaide	43	35
45	Flynn Young	181	3 February 2002	23	2025	Geelong (U18), Werribee	8	5
47	Wade Derksen	195	18 June 2001	24	–	Peel, Greater Western Sydney	–	–
Senior coaching panel
	Coach	Coaching position			Carlton Coaching debut	Former clubs as coach
	Michael Voss	Senior coach (to round 9)			2022	Brisbane Lions (s), Port Adelaide (a)
	Josh Fraser	Assistant coach (forwards) – to round 9 Caretaker coach – from round 10			2016	Gold Coast reserves (s), Northern Bullants (s), Collingwood reserves (s)
	Leigh Adams	Assistant coach (midfield)			2026	South Croydon (s), Coburg (s), North Melbourne (d, a, cs)
	Tim Clarke	Assistant coach (midfield and stoppage structure)			2016	Richmond (a), Coburg (s), Richmond reserves (s), Gold Coast (a)
	Ashley Hansen	Assistant coach (defence)			2022	Western Bulldogs (a), Footscray reserves (s)
	Matthew Kreuzer	Assistant coach (ruck)			2022
	Jordan Russell	Head of development			2022	Western Bulldogs (d), North Melbourne (a)
	Damian Truslove	Development and reserves coach			2026	Richmond (a), Greater Western Sydney (a), Bendigo Pioneers (s), GWS reserves (s), Sydney reserves (s)
	Torin Baker	Carlton College of Sport and Academy and development coach			2021	Western Jets (s), Hawthorn (d)

- For players: (c) denotes captain, (vc) denotes vice-captain.
- For coaches: (s) denotes senior coach, (cs) denotes caretaker senior coach, (a) denotes assistant coach, (d) denotes development coach, (m) denotes managerial or administrative role in a football or coaching department

== Playing list changes ==
The following summarises all player changes which occurred after the 2025 season. Unless otherwise noted, draft picks refer to selections in the 2025 national draft.

Carlton's player movements period was eventful. Throughout the 2025 season, eighth year ruckman Tom de Koning and tenth year utility Jack Silvagni were both linked to free agency departures, both players moving to St Kilda early in the signing period. The club's trade period was then focussed on three major storylines: the request for a trade by two-time Coleman Medallist Charlie Curnow, who was three years into his seven-year contract with the club; the club's desire to add speedy players to its wings and flanks; and the club's need to secure enough draft picks to make a father-son rule bid on highly ranked defensive prospect Harry Dean, son of two-time premiership player Peter Dean. Overall, Carlton engaged in five trades for players and five trades for draft picks (including live trades during the draft), able to achieve both of its aims and successfully arrange a trade for Curnow inside the final minutes of the trade period.

=== In ===
Player	Former club	League	via
Liam Reidy	Fremantle	AFL	AFL trade period along with Fremantle's third- and fourth-round draft picks (provisionally No. 53 and 71), in exchange for Carlton's higher third- and fourth-round draft picks (provisionally No. 50 and 68).
Campbell Chesser	West Coast	AFL	AFL trade period, in exchange for a third-round draft pick (provisionally No. 41).
Ben Ainsworth	Gold Coast	AFL	AFL trade period, in a three-way trade with Gold Coast and Port Adelaide which also saw Carlton gain a fourth-round draft pick (provisionally No. 67) and give up Corey Durdin and a second-round draft pick in the 2026 draft.
Oliver Florent	Sydney	AFL	AFL trade period, in exchange for a third-round draft pick in the 2026 draft.
Will Hayward	Sydney	AFL	AFL trade period, along with a first-round draft pick (provisionally No. 11), and first-round draft picks in the 2026 and 2027 drafts; in exchange for Charlie Curnow, a second- and third-round draft pick (provisionally No. 31 and 42) and a second-round draft pick in the 2027 draft; in exchange for Will Hayward.
Harry Dean	Murray (U18)	Talent League	2025 AFL national draft, first round selection (No. 3 overall), after matching a bid by West Coast under the father-son rule.
Talor Byrne	GWV (U18)	Talent League	2025 AFL national draft, third round selection (No. 45 overall).
Jack Ison	Oakleigh (U18)	Talent League	2025 AFL national draft, third round selection (No. 47 overall), as a Next Generation Academy selection after matching a bid by North Melbourne.
Wade Derksen	Greater Western Sydney	AFL	Signed as a train-on player, then joined the list in the pre-season supplemental selection period.
Flynn Riley	Carlton reserves	VFL	2026 mid-season draft, first round selection (No. 4 overall).

=== Out ===
Player	New Club	League	via
Sam Docherty			Retired
Alex Cincotta			Delisted after the 2025 season
Orazio Fantasia			Delisted after the 2025 season
Harry Lemmey			Delisted after the 2025 season
Tom de Koning	St Kilda	AFL	Signed by St Kilda as a restricted free agent, Carlton declined to match St Kilda's $1.7m/yr offer. Received a compensatory first-round draft pick.
Jack Silvagni	St Kilda	AFL	Signed by St Kilda as an unrestricted free agent. Received a compensatory end-of-first-round draft pick.
Corey Durdin	Port Adelaide	AFL	AFL trade period, in a three-way trade with Gold Coast and Port Adelaide which also saw Carlton gain a fourth-round draft pick (provisionally No. 67) and Ben Ainsworth and give up a second-round draft pick in the 2026 draft.
Charlie Curnow	Sydney	AFL	AFL trade period, along with a second- and third-round draft pick (provisionally No. 31 and 42) and a second-round draft pick in the 2027 draft; in exchange for Will Hayward, a first-round draft pick (provisionally No. 11), and first-round draft picks in the 2026 and 2027 drafts.
Jaxon Binns			Delisted after the trade period.
Will White			Delisted after the trade period. He trained with the club as a train-on player during the offseason, but was not relisted.

=== List management ===
Player	Change
Elijah Hollands	Originally delisted after the trade period, before continuing to train with the club as a train-on player and being re-signed in the supplemental selection period.
Draft picks	AFL trade period, received two draft picks from Hawthorn (provisionally No. 10 and 22) in exchange for four draft picks (provisionally No. 9, 31, 42 and 43).
Draft picks	2025 National draft live trade, received three draft picks from Essendon (provisionally No. 21, 27 and 30) in exchange for two draft picks (provisionally No. 9 and 43).
Draft picks	2025 National draft live trade, received three draft picks from North Melbourne (provisionally No. 25, 46 and second-round draft pick in 2026) in exchange for two draft picks (provisionally No. 11 and 54).
Draft picks	2025 National draft live trade, received one draft pick from Gold Coast (a second-round draft pick in 2026) in exchange for one draft pick (provisionally No. 28).
Draft picks	2025 National draft live trade, received one draft pick from Brisbane Lions (a third-round draft pick in 2026) in exchange for one draft pick (provisionally No. 38).
Hudson O'Keeffe	Elevated from the rookie list to the senior list.

== Season summary ==
=== Pre-season ===
Carlton played two practice matches, the first deemed unofficial match simulation and the second deemed an official practice match, as part of its lead-up to the premiership season.

**Date and local time**	**Opponent**	**Scores** (Carlton's scores indicated in **bold**)			**Venue**
**Date and local time**	**Opponent**	Home	Away	Result	**Venue**
Wednesday, 18 February (4:00 pm)	Brisbane Lions	13.10 (88)	**15.13 (103)**	Won by 15 points	Brighton Homes Arena (A)
Wednesday, 25 February (7:10 pm)	Geelong	**13.8 (86)**	11.5 (71)	Won by 15 points	Ikon Park (H)

=== Home-and-away season ===
After finishing 11th in 2025 and losing Curnow, de Koning and Silvagni between seasons, pundits almost unanimously predicted Carlton would have a middling season, with a possible but unlikely wildcard appearance.

Carlton began the season much more poorly than expected, and after round 9 the team was 16th on the ladder with a 1–8 record – that sole win coming unconvincingly by four points against Richmond (who eventually finished 17th). The team's performances were repeatedly characterised by competitive or even dominant first halves, before being overrun in weak second halves, with performances including: in the opening round against Sydney (led by 22 points in the third quarter, lost by 63 points); in round 1 against Richmond (led by 29 points in the third quarter, held on to win by four points); in round 3 against Melbourne (kicked the first seven goals and held Melbourne goalless until the 26th minute of the second quarter, lost by 23 points); in round 4 against North Melbourne (conceded the last five goals, lost by 10 points); in round 6 against Collingwood (led by 23 points in the third quarter, lost on a kick after the final siren); and in round 8 against St Kilda (led by 15 points in third quarter, lost by 39 points). Second half fade-outs had dogged Carlton throughout Michael Voss' entire coaching tenure, something which analysts ultimately put down to the fatigue caused by the hard contested ball tactics he preferred to employ; but the frequency of fade-outs at the start of 2026 was greater than in any of Voss' previous years.

Speculation from media and calls for fans that Voss – in the final year of his contract – should be sacked began early in the year, most infamously when 'Sack Voss' graffiti was painted on a Richmond café after the round 4 loss against North Melbourne. Voss ultimately resigned after the round 9 loss against Brisbane, and was replaced by Josh Fraser as interim coach.

Fraser immediately implemented a drastic change in the team's ball movement gameplan, adopting a short kick-and-mark strategy with focus on angled kicks, in place of the long kicking and contested marking game that Voss had employed. This saw significant statistical shifts: Carlton increased in short kicks (from 13th in the league under Voss to first under Fraser), uncontested marks (from 13th to 1st), effective kicks (from 15th to first), decreased in long kicks (from 6th to 18th) and still maintained their strength in contested possessions which had been their most prominent strength under Voss. The new, effective gameplan drove a complete reversal in form, and after having lost its last seven matches under Voss, the team won its first seven in a row under Fraser, which included wins against finalists Western Bulldogs and Geelong to climb from 16th on the ladder to 10th after round 17. However, after losing the next two matches, Carlton dropped to 12th.

Entering the final month, Carlton was in a four-club fight for tenth place – but with a more difficult fixture and weaker percentage than St Kilda and Greater Western Sydney was considered an outsider. But, a 76-point round 21 win against eventual premiers Brisbane Lions, followed by a big round 22 win against wildcard favourite St Kilda put Carlton in control of its own destiny – needing at least one win or draw from its last two matches, or for St Kilda and GWS each to lose both matches. Carlton secured its wildcard position with a draw against the 8th-placed Bulldogs in round 23, resulting in unusually huge final siren cheers for a drawn match. Carlton ended by defeating minor premiers Fremantle in the final round as well, and finished in 10th place by a 10 premiership point margin above St Kilda in 11th.

Altogether, Carlton's record under Fraser in the latter half of the season was 11–2–1, the best record among all 18 clubs over the same fifteen rounds. Fraser was appointed full-time senior coach on a three-year contract following the wildcard-clinching draw in round 23.

**Rd**	**Date and local time**	**Opponent**	**Scores** (Carlton's scores indicated in **bold**)			**Venue**	**Attendance**	**Ladder**
**Rd**	**Date and local time**	**Opponent**	Home	Away	Result	**Venue**	**Attendance**	**Ladder**
Op	Thursday, 5 March (7:30 pm)	Sydney	20.12 (132)	**10.9 (69)**	Lost by 63 points	Sydney Cricket Ground (A)	40,372	10th
1	Thursday, 12 March (7:30 pm)	Richmond	**10.15 (75)**	9.17 (71)	Won by 4 points	Melbourne Cricket Ground (H)	74,313	11th
2	Bye							15th
3	Sunday, 29 March (3:15 pm)	Melbourne	**11.11 (77)**	15.10 (100)	Lost by 23 points	Melbourne Cricket Ground (H)	67,763	16th
4	Friday, 3 April (3:15 pm)	North Melbourne	14.12 (96)	**13.8 (86)**	Lost by 10 points	Marvel Stadium (A)	45,919	15th
5	Thursday, 9 April (7:10 pm)	Adelaide	17.12 (114)	**12.14 (86)**	Lost by 28 points	Adelaide Oval (N)	49,184	16th
6	Thursday, 16 April (7:30 pm)	Collingwood	**12.11 (83)**	13.10 (88)	Lost by 5 points	Melbourne Cricket Ground (H)	78,058	16th
7	Saturday, 25 April (6:15 pm)	Fremantle	16.7 (103)	**13.11 (89)**	Lost by 14 points	Optus Stadium (A)	54,100	16th
8	Saturday, 2 May (7:35 pm)	St Kilda	**9.15 (69)**	16.12 (108)	Lost by 39 points	Marvel Stadium (H)	41,062	16th
9	Friday, 8 May (7:30 pm)	Brisbane Lions	14.16 (100)	**13.11 (89)**	Lost by 11 points	The Gabba (A)	31,147	16th
10	Saturday, 16 May (7:35 pm)	Western Bulldogs	**10.14 (74)**	9.8 (62)	Won by 12 points	Marvel Stadium (H)	39,217	16th
11	Saturday, 23 May (7:05 pm)	Port Adelaide	8.10 (58)	**13.14 (92)**	Won by 34 points	Adelaide Oval (A)	40,597	15th
12	Friday, 29 May (7:40 pm)	Geelong	**12.16 (88)**	12.12 (84)	Won by 4 points	Melbourne Cricket Ground (H)	61,081	14th
13	Sunday, 7 June (7:20 pm)	Essendon	10.7 (67)	**10.12 (72)**	Won by 5 points	Melbourne Cricket Ground (A)	76,745	13th
14	Bye							14th
15	Saturday, 20 June (4:15 pm)	GWS	9.11 (65)	**12.16 (88)**	Won by 23 points	Engie Stadium (A)	13,709	14th
16	Saturday, 27 June (1:15 pm)	West Coast	**17.15 (117)**	9.10 (64)	Won by 53 points	Marvel Stadium (H)	41,861	12th
17	Saturday, 4 July (7:35 pm)	Richmond	10.12 (72)	**10.14 (74)**	Won by 2 points	Melbourne Cricket Ground (A)	54,923	10th
18	Saturday, 11 July (7:35 pm)	Hawthorn	6.3 (39)	**15.13 (103)**	Lost by 64 points	Melbourne Cricket Ground (H)	70,314	12th
19	Saturday, 18 July (7:35 pm)	Collingwood	14.6 (90)	**10.9 (69)**	Lost by 21 points	Melbourne Cricket Ground (A)	83,885	12th
20	Saturday, 25 July (1:05 pm)	Gold Coast	**16.14 (110)**	15.7 (97)	Won by 13 points	Marvel Stadium (H)	26,945	11th
21	Saturday, 1 August (7:40 pm)	Brisbane Lions	**24.10 (154)**	11.12 (78)	Won by 76 points	Marvel Stadium (H)	40,988	10th
22	Sunday, 9 August (7:20 pm)	St Kilda	8.14 (62)	**16.10 (106)**	Won by 44 points	Marvel Stadium (A)	43,434	10th
23	Sunday, 16 August (3:15 pm)	Western Bulldogs	12.10 (82)	**12.10 (82)**	Match drawn	Marvel Stadium (A)	44,106	10th
24	Saturday, 22 August (1:15 pm)	Fremantle	**18.11 (119)**	12.10 (82)	Won by 37 points	Marvel Stadium (H)	42,020	10th

=== Finals ===
In the wildcard final, Carlton faced Melbourne. After conceding the first four goals of the first quarter, Carlton kicked the next five goals to take the lead just before half time. It was a close second half, before Carlton kicked two goals – both by Jagga Smith – to none in the final quarter to win by 19 points. Ben Ainsworth kicked three goals and Sam Walsh had 39 disposals.

Carlton then faced Geelong in the elimination final. A strong start saw Carlton lead by as much as 21 points early in the second quarter, but Geelong had fought back to trail by three points at half time. As rain fell in the second half, Geelong ultimately kicked away with a run of eight consecutive goals either side of three-quarter time, with a final margin of 33 points.

**Week**	**Date and local time**	**Opponent**	**Scores** (Carlton's scores indicated in **bold**)			**Venue**	**Attendance**
**Week**	**Date and local time**	**Opponent**	Home	Away	Result	**Venue**	**Attendance**
Wildcard final	Saturday, 29 August (7:35 pm)	Melbourne	7.13 (55)	**10.14 (74)**	Won by 19 points	Melbourne Cricket Ground (A)	91,733
Elimination final	Friday, 4 September (7:40 pm)	Geelong	14.23 (107)	**11.8 (74)**	Lost by 33 points	Melbourne Cricket Ground (A)	96,680

== Team records ==
- Opening round – Sydney scored 12.3 (75) against Carlton in the third quarter, the highest score Carlton had conceded in any quarter since 1969. Carlton also scored 4.2 (26), with their combined 16.5 (101) making it the highest scoring quarter in any match since 2007.
- Rounds 21–24 – Carlton won 13 consecutive quarters, equalling the club's 1994 13-quarter streak as the longest such streak in the club's history.

== Individual awards and records ==
=== Leading goalkickers ===
With four-time defending leading goalkicker and two-time Coleman Medallist Charlie Curnow having departed the club after 2025, the make-up of Carlton's forward line changed significantly for 2026 and was reflected in its leading goalkickers. Brodie Kemp, who had played five seasons as a defender then moved to the forward line in an injury-interrupted 2025 season, was the club's leading goalkicker for the first time with 39 goals. Mitch McGovern, also playing forward after years as a defender or swingman, kicked the most goals in a season of his 11-year career to date, and new recruits Ben Ainsworth and Will Hayward were among the top goalkickers. Carlton had six separate players kick 20 or more goals for the year, the first time they had achieved this since 2001.

Player	Goals	Behinds
Brodie Kemp	39	27
Harry McKay	35	27
Mitch McGovern	34	16
Ben Ainsworth	30	20
Will Hayward	24	16
Francis Evans	24	15

=== AFL Rising Star ===
Carlton players filled the top two places in the 2026 AFL Rising Star award.

- Second-year midfielder Jagga Smith, who had missed the entire 2025 season with a knee reconstruction, earned his nomination in round 1, and polled 54 of a possible 55 votes from the eleven-person voting panel to win the award.
- First-year key defender Harry Dean earned his nomination in round 12, and polled 39 votes to finish second.

It was the first time the top two finishers had come from the same club since 2004, when Jared Rivers and Aaron Davey of Melbourne finished top two. Two other Carlton players were nominated without polling votes in the final count: small forward Talor Byrne (round 20) and rebounding defender Billy Wilson (round 24).

=== Other awards ===
Representative honours

The following Carlton players were selected for representative teams during the 2025 season.

- In the 2026 AFL Origin match:
  - For Western Australia: Patrick Cripps, who was named captain.
  - For Victoria: Jacob Weitering.

Honorary teams

- No Carlton players were selected in the 2026 All-Australian team. Patrick Cripps was the only Carlton player named in the 46-man squad.
- Two Carlton players were named in the 2026 22under22 team: Jagga Smith (wing) and Harry Dean (full back).

Other awards

- Harry Dean won the AFL Players' Association Best First Year Player award.

Statistical leaders

- Patrick Cripps led the league in clearances across the completed season (188), and tied with Jai Newcombe (Hawthorn) for the home-and-away season (174).

== Notable events ==
=== Elijah Hollands' behaviour against Collingwood ===
During its round 6 match against Collingwood, wingman Elijah Hollands played while suffering a mental health episode, displaying erratic and disengaged behaviour on the field throughout both the warm-up and match. Unable to have an impact, he recorded only one disposal before being benched in the final quarter. Hollands had missed much of the 2025 season as he dealt with mental health and alcohol abuse problems, but had won a place back on the list during the supplemental selection period and was recapturing some of his earlier strong form before the round 6 episode.

Hollands was admitted to hospital in the aftermath, and did not play another match for the club, ultimately being delisted at the end of the year. Carlton was fined $75,000, to be donated to headspace, for its mishandling of the episode, especially for leaving him on the field for as long as it did. The incident also prompted the AFL to mandate that all AFL clubs employ a full-time psychologist.

== AFL Women's ==
Carlton's AFL Women's team will contest its 11th season of the AFL Women's competition.

Eight players departed the club during the 2025–26 AFL Women's player movement period: Tarni Brown retired; Mia Austin (Melbourne), Keeley Skepper (West Coast) and Maddison Torpey (Kangaroos) departed in trades; and Charlotte Brewer, Maria Cannon, Eliza Wood and six-year captain Kerryn Peterson were delisted. Peterson's delisting drew some controversy, as she had inactive during the final year of her contract due to pregnancy.

Traded into the club were Gold Coast's Lauren Bella and Claudia Whitfort and Adelaide youngster Brooke Boileau; Lily Baxter (first round, pick No. 24) and Tayla McMillan (second round, No. 34) were drafted; and Gold Coast's Kiara Bischa joined the club as a replacement player for Breann Harrington, who went onto the inactive list due to pregnancy.

Mathew Buck continued in his third season as coach, and Abbie McKay continued in her second season as captain. Mimi Hill remained in the role of vice-captain, and Erone Fitzpatrick was elevated to an expanded three-woman leadership group alongside 2025 leaders Harriet Cordner and Tara Bohanna.

The team's 2026 squad is given below.

Carlton Football Club · AFL Women's personnel
Senior list		Rookie list	Coaching staff
1 Amelia Velardo; 2 Lauren Bella; 3 Darcy Vescio; 4 Claudia Whitfort; 5 Abbie McKay (c); 6 Gab Pound; 7 Poppy Scholz; 8 Lily Baxter; 10 Mimi Hill (vc); 11 Yasmin Duursma; 12 Jessica Good; 15 Meg Robertson; 16 Breann Harrington; 17 Dayna Finn; 18 Maddy Guerin; 19 Erone Fitzpatrick; 20 Lily Goss	21 Harriet Cordner; 22 Brooke Boileau; 23 Lila Keck; 24 Brooke Vickers; 25 Keeley Sherar; 26 Tayla McMillan; 30 Kiara Bischa; 33 Lou-Lou Field; 36 Ciara Fitzgerald; 42 Tara Bohanna; 49 Madeline Hendrie; 55 Sophie McKay	13 Aisling Reidy; 14 Siofra O'Connell	Head coach: Mathew Buck; Assistant coaches: Lloyd Perris (back line); Aasta O'Connor (midfield); Jess Dal Pos (forward line); Will Sexton (development); Legend: (c) Captain(s); (vc) Vice-captain(s); italics – Inactive; (ret) Retired; Pregnancy; Long-term injury; Updated: Source(s): Players, coaches, injuries

== Reserves ==
Carlton fielded reserves and state level teams in the men's and women's competitions during the 2026 season.

=== Men's ===
Carlton's men's reserves team contested its ninth VFL season; and its 89th overall season of reserves and state level competition dating back to 1919.

Damian Truslove took over from Luke Power as reserves coach. VFL-listed players newly signed to the team included: former AFL-listed senior players Darcy Tucker (Fremantle and North Melbourne), Jaidan Magor (Sydney) and Alwyn Davey Jr. (Essendon); and Will Cookson, Ryder Corrigan, Charlie Cotter, Tom Evans, Liam Farrer, Tyson Gresham, Jack O'Sullivan, Sam Paea, Cohen Paul, Will Reinhold, Jed Rule, Jack Sammartino and Harrison Wilson. Retained from 2025 were: Ollie Badr, Dane Harvey, Cooper Hamilton, Darcy Hogg, Taj Logan, Ethan Phillips, Logan Prout, Archie Stevens, Cooper Vickery, Ollie Warburton; and Flynn Riley who joined the Carlton senior list in the mid-season draft. The club implemented a policy of one of having one of its AFL-listed players serve as reserves captain on a rotating basis, rather than a single appointed reserves player fulfilling the role, as part of serving leadership development among the senior corps; a reserves-listed leadership group of Tucker, Phillips, Sammartino, Prout, Cookson and Vickery was also appointed.

Carlton's reserves finished 9th out of 22 clubs in the 2026 VFL season, with a record of 10–8 to reach the wildcard round of the finals on percentage. Carlton was comfortably beaten by Williamstown in its wildcard final, trailing by as much as 82 points in the third quarter before nine final quarter goals narrowed the margin to 38 points.

Reserves finals matches

**Week**	**Date and local time**	**Opponent**	**Scores** (Carlton's scores indicated in **bold**)			**Venue**
**Week**	**Date and local time**	**Opponent**	Home	Away	Result	**Venue**
Wildcard final	Saturday, 22 August (11:05 am)	Williamstown	19.7 (121)	**12.11 (83)**	Lost by 38 points	DSV Stadium (A)

=== Women's ===
The club fielded a team in the VFL Women's competition for the eighth time. Aasta O'Connor continued in her second season as coach. Two new co-captains were appointed: Grace Master and Steph Demeo.

Carlton finished fourth out of twelve clubs during the home-and-away season, with a win–loss record of 9–5, before finishing fifth overall after losing the elimination final against Port Melbourne.

VFL Women's finals matches

**Week**	**Date and local time**	**Opponent**	**Scores** (Carlton's scores indicated in **bold**)			**Venue**
**Week**	**Date and local time**	**Opponent**	Home	Away	Result	**Venue**
Elimination final	Saturday, 5 September (1:05 pm)	Port Melbourne	**5.5 (35)**	6.9 (45)	Lost by 10 points	Ikon Park (H)
