= 2025 Carlton Football Club season =

Australian Football League team season

Carlton Football Club
2025 season
- President: Robert Priestley
- Coach: Michael Voss
- Captain: Patrick Cripps
- Home ground: Melbourne Cricket Ground, Marvel Stadium (Training and administrative: Ikon Park)
- AFL season: 11th (9–14)
- AFL Women's season: 4th (8–6 H&A, 2–1 finals)
- Leading goalkicker: Charlie Curnow (32)
- Average home attendance: 48,521
- Club membership: 100,743

The 2025 Carlton Football Club season was the Carlton Football Club's 162nd season of competition.

It was the club's men's team's 129th season as a member of the Australian Football League, and the fourth under senior coach Michael Voss; and, in a decline from the prior three seasons, Carlton finished the season 11th with a win-loss record of 9–14, more than five games short of a finals berth.

The club's women's team is contesting its tenth season in the AFL Women's. The team finished 5th in the home-and-away season with an 8–6 record to qualify for finals for the first time since 2020, and finished 4th overall after being defeated in the preliminary finals.

The club also fielded its men's reserves team in the Victorian Football League and its state level women's team in the VFL Women's, failing to reach finals in either competition.

== Club summary ==
The 2025 AFL season will be the 129th season of the VFL/AFL competition since its inception in 1897; and, having competed in every season, it will also be the 129th season contested by the Carlton Football Club. The club will field its women's team in the tenth season of the AFL Women's competition, its men's reserves team in its eighth Victorian Football League season, and its VFL women's team in its seventh VFL Women's season.

Carlton's primary home ground will be the Melbourne Cricket Ground and secondary home ground will be Marvel Stadium, with the team playing six home games at the former and five at the latter. This was a reversal of the distribution from prior years, coming after its six-games-per-year deal at Marvel Stadium expired at the end of 2024 and as the result of successful lobbying to the AFL for an extra game at the Melbourne Cricket Ground. Traditional home ground Ikon Park continued to serve as the training and administrative base, and as the home ground for AFL Women's and the men's reserves matches.

Car manufacturer Hyundai, which had been a major sponsor of the club continuously since 2008, and Great Southern Bank, which became a major sponsor during the 2021 season, continued as the club's major sponsors through the 2025 season. The club launched Imaging Associates Carlton, a medical imaging joint venture with Imaging Associates. The club's membership tally was 100,743, a reduction from the record it had set in 2024, the third-highest tally in the league behind Collingwood and West Coast. The club reported a statutory loss of $1.16 million for the season.

== Senior personnel ==
Luke Sayers was initially set to continue in his fourth year as president, but he stepped down on 22 January. Sayers departure came two weeks after a lewd image was posted on Sayers' X account, tagging a female board member of one of the club's sponsors; Sayers claimed, and an AFL investigations subsequently confirmed, that his account had been hacked and that Sayers had not posted the image himself, but he nonetheless elected to step down after those investigations were complete. Robert Priestley and Patty Kinnersly stepped in as interim co-presidents, before Priestley was appointed president on 7 February. At the time of appointment, Priestley was chairman of J. P. Morgan Australia and New Zealand.

Brian Cook served his fourth and final year as CEO, and Collingwood general manager of football Graham Wright was appointed deputy CEO under a succession plan which saw him take over from Cook on 15 August.

Michael Voss continued in his fourth year as senior coach of the club. Patrick Cripps continued in his fourth year as sole club captain and seventh year overall (having served as co-captain with Sam Docherty for three years). The broader leadership group was also unchanged from 2024, with Charlie Curnow, Sam Walsh and Jacob Weitering continuing in the roles.

== Squad for 2025 ==
The following is Carlton's squad for the 2025 season.

Senior List
No.	Player	Age	AFL Debut	Recruited from	Career (to end 2024)		2024 Player Statistics
No.	Player	Age	AFL Debut	Recruited from	Gms	Gls	Gms	Gls	B	D	K	HB	M	T	HO
1	Jack Silvagni	27	2016	Oakleigh (U18)	115	87	13	2	4	179	139	40	76	30	–
2	Lachie Cowan	20	2023	Devonport, Tasmania (U18)	24	1	14	1	0	203	144	59	68	35	0
3	Jesse Motlop	21	2022	South Fremantle	40	42	23	17	18	245	155	90	49	84	0
4	Oliver Hollands	20	2023	Murray (U18)	42	7	23	4	2	439	260	179	115	75	0
5	Adam Cerra	25	2018	Eastern (U18), Fremantle	129	34	19	5	3	468	259	209	81	89	0
6	Zac Williams	30	2013	GWS Academy, GWS	155	47	19	22	10	281	180	101	55	35	0
7	Jagga Smith	18	–	Oakleigh (U18)	–	–	–	–	–	–	–	–	–	–	–
8	Lachie Fogarty	25	2018	Western (U18), Geelong	70	25	20	11	11	237	113	124	53	76	0
9	Patrick Cripps (c)	29	2014	East Fremantle	207	113	23	14	17	556	220	336	50	132	12
10	Harry McKay	27	2017	Gippsland (U18)	128	252	12	22	10	172	111	61	75	31	30
11	Mitch McGovern	30	2016	Claremont, Adelaide	128	109	17	11	3	244	191	53	76	26	0
12	Tom de Koning	25	2018	Dandenong (U18)	78	30	22	6	10	381	194	187	72	51	512
13	Blake Acres	29	2014	West Perth, St Kilda, Fremantle	168	60	19	5	9	355	210	145	87	54	0
14	Orazio Fantasia	29	2014	Norwood, Essendon, Port Adelaide	114	150	6	7	4	68	41	27	18	13	0
15	Sam Docherty	31	2013	Gippsland (U18), Brisbane Lions	169	26	15	5	4	304	198	106	87	41	0
16	Ben Camporeale	18	–	Glenelg	–	–	–	–	–	–	–	–	–	–	–
17	Brodie Kemp	23	2021	Bendigo (U18)	44	7	5	7	4	43	28	15	15	11	0
18	Sam Walsh (vc)	24	2019	Geelong (U18)	119	42	14	5	5	368	152	216	50	64	0
19	Corey Durdin	22	2021	Central District	48	34	16	14	8	128	81	47	39	29	0
20	Elijah Hollands	22	2022	Murray (U18), Gold Coast	36	25	5	1	1	85	51	34	19	14	0
21	Lucas Camporeale	18	2025	Glenelg	–	–	3	0	0	34	18	16	7	6	0
22	Harry O'Farrell	18	2025	Calder (U18)	–	–	6	1	1	61	43	18	29	9	0
23	Jacob Weitering (vc)	27	2016	Dandenong (U18)	181	11	23	–	–	316	247	69	162	22	1
24	Nic Newman	31	2017	Frankston, Sydney	134	18	–	–	–	–	–	–	–	–	–
25	Jaxon Binns	20	2024	Dandenong (U18)	3	2	5	1	2	84	64	20	18	6	0
26	Nick Haynes	32	2012	Dandenong (U18)	211	13	23	–	1	392	282	110	180	33	0
27	Marc Pittonet	28	2016	Oakleigh (U18), Hawthorn	73	10	7	2	–	84	32	52	12	24	168
29	George Hewett	29	2016	North Adelaide, Sydney	179	46	23	7	5	647	254	393	70	131	0
30	Charlie Curnow	27	2016	Geelong (U18)	131	281	18	32	27	212	177	35	107	21	0
31	Harry Lemmey	20	—	West Adelaide	–	–	–	–	–	–	–	–	–	–	–
33	Lewis Young	26	2017	Sturt, Western Bulldogs	67	3	13	6	2	129	76	53	49	22	35
35	Billy Wilson	19	2025	Dandenong (U18)	–	–	4	0	0	48	29	19	13	8	0
42	Adam Saad	30	2015	Calder (U18), Coburg, Gold Coast, Essendon	195	11	21	1	1	378	264	114	61	53	0
43	Ashton Moir	19	2024	Glenelg	2	2	9	10	6	75	47	28	26	10	0
46	Matthew Cottrell	24	2020	Dandenong (U18)	68	34	6	2	5	99	70	29	23	11	0
Rookie List
No.	Player	Age	AFL Debut	Recruited from	Career (to end 2024)		2024 Player Statistics
No.	Player	Age	AFL Debut	Recruited from	Gms	Gls	Gms	Gls	B	D	K	HB	M	T	HO
28	Harry Charleson	18	–	GWV	–	–	–	–	–	–	–	–	–	–	–
32	Matt Carroll	19	2025	Sandringham (U18)	–	–	17	1	2	205	155	50	65	25	0
34	Rob Monahan	20	—	Kerry	–	–	–	–	–	–	–	–	–	–	–
36	Cooper Lord	19	2024	Sandringham (U18), North Melbourne reserves	2	0	21	5	0	294	157	137	57	82	0
37	Jordan Boyd	26	2022	Western (U18), Footscray reserves	35	1	3	–	–	26	19	7	6	2	0
38	Will White	20	2025	GWV (U18), Carlton reserves	–	–	14	10	11	120	81	39	31	27	0
39	Alex Cincotta	28	2023	Newtown & Chilwell, Carlton reserves	35	11	5	1	0	39	16	23	7	20	0
41	Matt Duffy	20	–	Longford GAA	–	–	–	–	–	–	–	–	–	–	–
44	Francis Evans	23	2021	Calder (U18), Geelong, Port Adelaide	33	22	10	13	6	114	72	42	31	31	0
45	Flynn Young	22	2025	Geelong (U18), Werribee	–	–	8	5	2	84	55	29	22	13	0
Senior coaching panel
	Coach	Coaching position				Carlton coaching debut		Former clubs as coach
	Michael Voss	Senior coach				2022		Brisbane Lions (s), Port Adelaide (a)
	Luke Power	Head of development, reserves coach				2020		GWS (a), AFL Academy Manager
	Tim Clarke	Assistant coach (Midfield)				2016		Richmond (a), Coburg (s), Richmond reserves (s), Gold Coast (a)
	Aaron Hamill	Assistant coach (backline)				2022		St Kilda (a), Sandringham (s)
	Ashley Hansen	Assistant coach (senior)				2022		Western Bulldogs (a), Footscray reserves (s)
	Matthew Kreuzer	Assistant coach (ruck)				2022
	Jordan Russell	Assistant coach (forward line)				2022		Western Bulldogs (d), North Melbourne (a)
	Tom Lonergan	Development and talent manager				2023		Calder Cannons (d), Geelong Falcons (d)
	Brad Ebert	Development coach				2023		Port Adelaide (m)
	Torin Baker	Carlton College of Sport and Academy and development coach				2021		Western Jets (s), Hawthorn (d)
	Aaron Greaves	Coaching and performance manager				2022		Melbourne (d, a), Port Adelaide (a, d), North Melbourne (d), AFL umpires (s)

- For players: (c) denotes captain, (vc) denotes vice-captain.
- For coaches: (s) denotes senior coach, (cs) denotes caretaker senior coach, (a) denotes assistant coach, (d) denotes development coach, (m) denotes managerial or administrative role in a football or coaching department

== Playing list changes ==
The following summarises all player changes which occurred after the 2024 season. Unless otherwise noted, draft picks refer to selections in the 2024 national draft.

Carlton took an active role in trading for draft picks during the trade period, trading up in the first round to secure midfielder Jagga Smith, and trading down to ensure it could meet father-son rule bids on Ben and Lucas Camporeale, twin sons of 1990s player Scott.

=== In ===
Player	Former Club	League	via
Nick Haynes	Greater Western Sydney	AFL	Signed as an unrestricted free agent
Jagga Smith	Oakleigh Chargers	Talent League	National draft, first round (No. 3 overall).
Harry O'Farrell	Calder Cannons	Talent League	National draft, second round (No. 40 overall).
Ben Camporeale	Glenelg	SANFL	National draft, father-son rule selection after matching the bid of Geelong in the third round (picked at No. 43 overall).
Lucas Camporeale	Glenelg	SANFL	National draft, father-son rule selection after matching the bid of Sydney in the third round (picked at No. 54 overall).
Harry Charleson	Greater Western Victoria	Talent League	Rookie draft, first round (No. 9 overall)
Matt Duffy	Longford	GAA	Category B rookie selection
Francis Evans	Port Adelaide	AFL	Joined the club as a reserves player, before being signed in the pre-season supplemental signing period
Will White	Carlton reserves	VFL	Joined the squad as a train-on player, then was signed during the extension to the pre-season supplemental signing period to occupy the list space vacated by Jagga Smith's long-term injury
Flynn Young	Werribee	VFL	Midseason draft, first round (No. 4 overall).

=== Out ===
Player	New Club	League	via
Jack Martin	Geelong	AFL	Delisted prior to the trade period, then signed by Geelong as a delisted free agent
David Cuningham	Footscray reserves	VFL	Delisted prior to the trade period.
Caleb Marchbank	Retired		Delisted prior to the trade period.
Alex Mirkov	Old Ivanhoe	VAFA	Delisted from the rookie list prior to the trade period.
Domanic Akuei	Essendon reserves	VFL	Delisted from the rookie list prior to the trade period.
Matthew Owies	West Coast	AFL	AFL trade period, in a three-way trade which saw Carlton receive a first round draft pick and two fourth round draft picks (provisionally No. 3, 63 and 66) from West Coast, give a lower first round draft pick and a fifth round draft pick (provisionally No. 12 and 73) to West Coast, and give a lower first round draft pick (provisionally No. 14) to Richmond.
Matt Kennedy	Western Bulldogs	AFL	AFL trade period, in a four-way trade, which saw Carlton trade Kennedy to Western Bulldogs and receive a second round draft pick (provisionally No. 38) from Geelong.
Jack Carroll	St Kilda	AFL	Delisted after the trade period, then signed as a delisted free agent
Sam Durdin	Box Hill Hawks	VFL	Delisted from the rookie list after the trade period

=== List management ===
Player	Change
Draft picks	Received a fourth round draft pick (provisionally No. 73) and a second round draft pick in the 2025 national draft from Brisbane Lions, in exchange for a second round draft pick and a fourth round draft pick (provisionally No. 34 and 66).
Draft picks	Received a first round draft pick (provisionally No. 14) from Hawthorn, in exchange for a first round draft pick and a second round draft pick in the 2025 national draft.
Matt Carroll	Initially delisted from the rookie list after the trade period, before joining the squad as a train-on player, then being re-signed as a rookie during the pre-season supplemental selection period.
Liam McMahon; Denver Grainger-Barras; Ethan Phillips	Joined the squad as train-on players, but were ultimately not signed during the supplemental selection period

== Season summary ==
=== Pre-season ===
Carlton played two practice matches, the first deemed unofficial match simulation and the second deemed an official practice match, as part of its lead-up to the premiership season.

**Date and local time**	**Opponent**	**Scores** (Carlton's scores indicated in **bold**)			**Venue**
**Date and local time**	**Opponent**	Home	Away	Result	**Venue**
Saturday, 22 February (11:00 am)	St Kilda	**8.10 (58)**	10.9 (69)	Lost by 11 points	Ikon Park (H)
Friday, 28 February (5:20 pm)	Greater Western Sydney	9.12 (66)	**18.16 (124)**	Won by 58 points	Manuka Oval (A)

=== Home-and-away season ===
After being the league's best performing club between mid-2023 and mid-2024, before falling away with a 2–8 end to the 2024 season, external expectations of Carlton's prospects were mixed entering 2025: bookmakers had Carlton at equal fourth favourite for the premiership, while many pundits predicted Carlton would miss the finals.

The season began poorly against 2024 wooden spooners Richmond, Carlton losing by 13 points after having squandered a 41-point second quarter lead; such was the negative reaction that the club swiftly postponed membership drive activities which had been planned on the SEN 1116 radio network for the following day. Three more losses followed, and Carlton was 16th on the ladder with a 0–4 start to the year. The next two months were more successful, and after winning six of the next nine games, Carlton was sitting tenth with a 6–7 record and competitive percentage. Up to this point, Carlton had been consistently much stronger in the first halves of matches and prone to second-half fadeouts: they had led at half time in eleven of thirteen matches, with a first half percentage of 139.2; but won only three second halves with a percentage of only 80.6. Through this time, the club was recognised and lauded for its defensive performance and structure, which to this point saw it among the top three clubs in the league for fewest points conceded, lowest chain-to-scoring percentage against, and highest rebound-to-inside-50 percentage; but was criticised for the quality of its inside-50 kicks, with the club ranking a distant last in the league in that metric.

Rounds 15 and 16 were pivotal, as they saw back-to-back disappointing losses against weaker opponents which all but ended any realistic chance of playing finals: in round 15 against 16th-placed North Melbourne, Carlton lost by 11 points, after having trailed by as much as 46 points; and in round 16 against 12th-placed Port Adelaide, Carlton lost by 50 points, after managing only one goal in the first half. The club's late season results went on to be much poorer than the early half of the season, Carlton ultimately winning only three of its final ten matches, and declining significantly in the ball movement and defensive metrics it had excelled in during the first half of the year.

The club's final record was 9–14, for an eleventh-place finish. Results were relatively consistent with ladder position: Carlton's record against the top ten was 1–11, the sole win coming in round 7 against Geelong; and its record against the bottom seven was 8–3.

**Rd**	**Date and local time**	**Opponent**	**Scores** (Carlton's scores indicated in **bold**)			**Venue**	**Attendance**	**Ladder**
**Rd**	**Date and local time**	**Opponent**	Home	Away	Result	**Venue**	**Attendance**	**Ladder**
Op	Bye							–
1	Thursday, 13 March (7:30 pm)	Richmond	13.4 (82)	**9.15 (69)**	Lost by 13 points	Melbourne Cricket Ground (A)	80,009	13th
2	Thursday, 20 March (7:30 pm)	Hawthorn	**8.12 (60)**	12.8 (80)	Lost by 20 points	Melbourne Cricket Ground (H)	62,735	14th
3	Friday, 28 March (7:40 pm)	Western Bulldogs	**11.9 (75)**	12.11 (83)	Lost by 8 points	Marvel Stadium (H)	44,894	16th
4	Thursday, 3 April (7:30 pm)	Collingwood	8.15 (63)	**6.10 (46)**	Lost by 17 points	Melbourne Cricket Ground (A)	82,058	16th
5	Saturday, 12 April (12:50 pm)	West Coast	**17.19 (121)**	6.14 (50)	Won by 71 points	Adelaide Oval (N)	41,252	14th
6	Friday, 18 April (3:20 pm)	North Melbourne	11.5 (71)	**24.9 (153)**	Won by 82 points	Marvel Stadium (A)	46,373	13th
7	Sunday, 27 April (3:20 pm)	Geelong	**14.10 (94)**	12.4 (76)	Won by 18 points	Melbourne Cricket Ground (H)	67,658	11th
8	Saturday, 3 May (3:45 pm)	Adelaide	16.14 (110)	**7.8 (50)**	Lost by 60 points	Adelaide Oval (A)	46,057	13th
9	Friday, 9 May (7:30 pm)	St Kilda	9.8 (62)	**11.11 (77)**	Won by 15 points	Melbourne Cricket Ground (A)	65,680	10th
10	Friday, 16 May (7:30 pm)	Sydney	11.12 (78)	**9.8 (62)**	Lost by 16 points	Sydney Cricket Ground (A)	39,082	11th
11	Saturday, 24 May (12:35 pm)	GWS	**12.10 (82)**	17.8 (110)	Lost by 28 points	Marvel Stadium (H)	36,468	12th
12	Bye							13th
13	Sunday, 8 June (7:20 pm)	Essendon	**11.12 (78)**	11.4 (70)	Won by 8 points	Melbourne Cricket Ground (H)	74,280	11th
14	Sunday, 15 June (4:10 pm)	West Coast	7.10 (52)	**12.14 (86)**	Won by 34 points	Optus Stadium (A)	43,803	10th
15	Saturday, 21 June (1:20 pm)	North Melbourne	**10.13 (73)**	13.6 (84)	Lost by 11 points	Melbourne Cricket Ground (H)	56,236	10th
16	Thursday, 26 June (7:00 pm)	Port Adelaide	16.14 (110)	**8.12 (60)**	Lost by 50 points	Adelaide Oval (A)	30,381	11th
17	Friday, 4 July (7:20 pm)	Collingwood	**8.11 (59)**	17.13 (115)	Lost by 56 points	Melbourne Cricket Ground (H)	75,827	12th
18	Thursday, 10 July (7:30 pm)	Brisbane Lions	**9.12 (66)**	15.13 (103)	Lost by 37 points	Marvel Stadium (H)	32,898	12th
19	Saturday, 19 July (7:35 pm)	Melbourne	**12.6 (78)**	10.10 (70)	Won by 8 points	Melbourne Cricket Ground (H)	40,869	12th
20	Thursday, 24 July (7:30 pm)	Hawthorn	13.7 (85)	**9.7 (61)**	Lost by 24 points	Melbourne Cricket Ground (A)	51,271	12th
21	Sunday, 3 August (3:10 pm)	Fremantle	15.4 (94)	**10.7 (67)**	Lost by 27 points	Optus Stadium (A)	39,358	13th
22	Saturday, 9 August (7:35 pm)	Gold Coast	**11.8 (74)**	13.15 (93)	Lost by 19 points	Marvel Stadium (H)	24,120	14th
23	Saturday, 16 August (1:20 pm)	Port Adelaide	**18.10 (118)**	9.10 (64)	Won by 54 points	Marvel Stadium (H)	25,020	12th
24	Thursday, 21 August (7:30 pm)	Essendon	8.8 (56)	**13.12 (90)**	Won by 34 points	Melbourne Cricket Ground (A)	41,050	11th

== Individual awards and records ==
=== John Nicholls Medal ===
The Carlton Football Club Best and Fairest awards night took place on 5 October 2025.

John Nicholls Medal

The winner of the John Nicholls Medal was George Hewett, who polled 160 votes to win the award for the first time in his career; in his fourth season with the club since crossing from Sydney, Hewett had previously managed two top five finishes before his first John Nicholls Medal win. Jacob Weitering finished second for his fourth top two finish in six years with 143 votes; Adam Cerra finished third, his best finish for the award to date; and Nick Haynes finished fourth in his first season with the club.

Pos.	Player	Votes
1st	George Hewett	160
2nd	Jacob Weitering	143
3rd	Adam Cerra	129
4th	Nick Haynes	126
5th	Patrick Cripps	125
6th	Tom de Koning	117
7th	Ollie Hollands	99
8th	Sam Walsh	93
9th	Adam Saad	86
9th	Jack Silvagni	86
9th	Zac Williams	86

Other awards

The following other awards were presented on John Nicholls Medal night:-

- Best Young Player – Cooper Lord
- Best Clubman – Marc Pittonet
- Spirit of Carlton Award – Cooper Lord
- Bill Lanyon Inner Blue Ruthless Award – George Hewett
- Carltonians William A. Cook Award – George Hewett
- Coaches' Award – George Hewett
- Players' Award – George Hewett
- Interstate Coterie Award – George Hewett

=== Leading goalkickers ===
Charlie Curnow was the club's leading goalkicker for the fourth consecutive time and fifth time overall, kicking 32 goals. Unlike the previous three years, when he had twice won and once finished second for the Coleman Medal, Curnow was not competitive among the league's top goalkickers in 2025. Tied for second place were: midfielder-forward Zac Williams with the highest goalkicking return of his career to date; and key forward Harry McKay, despite missing almost half of the season.

Player	Goals	Behinds
Charlie Curnow	32	27
Zac Williams	22	10
Harry McKay	22	10
Jesse Motlop	17	18
Patrick Cripps	14	17

=== Other awards ===
Representative honours

The following Carlton players were selected for representative teams during the 2025 season.

- In the Indigenous All-Stars match for the All-Stars: Zac Williams and Jesse Motlop.

Statistical leaders

- George Hewett led the league in handballs (393) for the home-and-away and complete seasons.

== AFL Women's ==
From the 2024 squad during the 2024–25 AFL Women's player movement period, Carlton lost experienced players Jess Dal Poss and Celine Moody to retirement, with Dal Pos remaining with the club as the forwards assistant coach; and delisted Marianna Anthony and Tahlia Read; while Kerryn Peterson, captain of the team for the previous six seasons, was out of the squad for the 2025 season on pregnancy leave. Carlton added former Gold Coast captain Tara Bohanna to the squad during the trade period, drafted Poppy Scholz, Loulou Field and Sophie McKay (daughter of Andrew McKay under the father-daughter rule and sister to Abbie) in the draft, and added Irish recruit Maria Cannon and former VFL Women's team captain Eliza Wood as supplemental signings.

Mathew Buck continued in his third season as the team's coach, and Abbie McKay replaced Kerryn Petersen as captain. Mimi Hill became vice captain, with the rest of the leadership group comprising Harriet Cordner and Tara Bohanna in her first season with the club.

The club's AFL Women's 2025 squad is given below.

Carlton Football Club (2025)
Senior list		Coaching staff
1 Amelia Velardo; 3 Darcy Vescio; 4 Keeley Skepper; 5 Abbie McKay (c); 6 Gab Pound; 7 Poppy Scholz; 8 Eliza Wood; 10 Mimi Hill (vc); 11 Yasmin Duursma; 12 Jess Good; 13 Aisling Reidy; 14 Siofra O'Connell; 15 Meg Robertson; 16 Breann Harrington	17 Dayna Finn; 18 Maddy Guerin; 19 Erone Fitzpatrick; 20 Lily Goss; 21 Harriet Cordner; 22 Mia Austin; 23 Lila Keck; 24 Brooke Vickers; 25 Keeley Sherar; 26 Tarni Brown; 31 Maria Cannon; 32 Charlotte Brewer; 33 Loulou Field; 36 Ciara Fitzgerald; 37 Maddison Torpey; 42 Tara Bohanna; 49 Madeline Hendrie; 55 Sophie McKay	**Head coach**: Mathew Buck; **Assistant coaches**: Aasta O'Connor (midfield); Jess Dal Pos(forwards); Glenn Strachan (backline); Lloyd Perris (development); Legend: (c) Captain(s); (vc) Vice-captain(s); Updated: Source(s): Senior list, Coaching staff

=== Season summary ===
==== Home and away season ====
**Rd**	**Date and local time**	**Opponent**	**Scores** (Carlton's scores indicated in **bold**)			**Venue**	**Attendance**	**Ladder**
**Rd**	**Date and local time**	**Opponent**	Home	Away	Result	**Venue**	**Attendance**	**Ladder**
1	Thursday, 14 August (7:15 pm)	Collingwood	**6.9 (45)**	3.3 (21)	Won by 24 points	Ikon Park (H)	8,042	5th
2	Saturday 23 August (7:15 pm)	Hawthorn	3.12 (30)	**2.10 (22)**	Lost by 8 points	Kinetic Stadium (A)	2,214	7th
3	Sunday, 31 August (5:05 pm)	Brisbane	6.8 (44)	**9.4 (58)**	Won by 14 points	Brighton Homes Arena (A)	2,805	7th
4	Saturday, 6 September (3:05 pm)	Western Bulldogs	**7.7 (49)**	4.9 (33)	Won by 14 points	Ikon Park (H)	2,826	5th
5	Saturday, 13 September (2:35 pm)	Gold Coast	**10.11 (71)**	4.1 (25)	Won by 46 points	Ikon Park (H)	2,016	3rd
6	Saturday, 20 September (1:05 pm)	Kangaroos	12.7 (79)	**4.2 (26)**	Lost by 53 points	Arden Street Oval (A)	2,633	6th
7	Friday, 26 September (5:05 pm)	Fremantle	**5.2 (32)**	3.5 (23)	Won by 9 points	Ikon Park (H)	2,165	5th
8	Sunday, 5 October (3:05 pm)	Geelong	5.7 (37)	**7.13 (55)**	Won by 18 points	GMHBA Stadium (A)	2,907	4th
9	Sunday, 12 October (1:05 pm)	Sydney	11.10 (76)	**5.7 (37)**	Lost by 39 points	Henson Park (A)	5,043	6th
10	Saturday, 18 October (7:15 pm)	St Kilda	**5.6 (36)**	7.7 (49)	Lost by 13 points	Ikon Park (H)	2,480	8th
11	Sunday, 26 October (3:05 pm)	GWS	**12.9 (81)**	5.5 (35)	Won by 46 points	Ikon Park (H)	1,336	5th
12	Friday, 31 October (6:15 pm)	West Coast	3.4 (22)	**6.6 (42)**	Won by 20 points	Sullivan Logistics Stadium (A)	2,365	5th

==== Finals ====
The elimination final saw Carlton its first finals match since the curtailed 2020 season, against West Coast playing its first ever finals match; in heavy rain, Carlton held a slim lead at half time before kicking 6.2 (38) to 0.1 (1) in the third quarter, ultimately winning by 41 points. In the semi-final against Hawthorn, Carlton scored 4.7 (31) to no score in a dominant first quarter and was never seriously challenged from there, winning by 46 points. The preliminary final against Brisbane was a close contest through the first half, Carlton 3.0 (18) trailing Brisbane 3.5 (23) at half time, before Brisbane kicked 6.1 (37) to 1.0 (6) in the third quarter and went on to win by 35 points.

**Rd**	**Date and local time**	**Opponent**	**Scores** (Carlton's scores indicated in **bold**)			**Venue**	**Attendance**
**Rd**	**Date and local time**	**Opponent**	Home	Away	Result	**Venue**	**Attendance**
Elimination final	Saturday, 8 November (3:05 pm)	West Coast	**9.6 (60)**	2.7 (19)	Won by 41 points	Ikon Park (H)	3,420
Semi-final	Saturday, 15 November (7:15 pm)	Hawthorn	4.9 (33)	**11.13 (79)**	Won by 46 points	Ikon Park (A)	5,645
Preliminary final	Saturday, 22 November (6:35 pm)	Brisbane	10.7 (67)	**5.2 (32)**	Lost by 35 points	Brighton Homes Arena (A)	6,511

=== Notable events ===
- Round 11's match against Greater Western Sydney was suspended during the third quarter under lightning protocols; it was played to its full length after resumption.

=== Awards ===
League awards

- Two Carlton players were named in the 2025 AFL Women's All-Australian team: Harriet Cordner and Dayna Finn. One other player, Erone Fitzpatrick, was also nominated in the original 42-woman squad.
- Two Carlton players were nominated for the 2025 AFL Women's Rising Star: Sophie McKay in round 4, and Poppy Scholz in round 6. As of 15 November, the final placings are yet to be announced.

== Reserves ==
=== Men's ===
Carlton's men's reserves team will contest its eighth VFL season; and its 88th overall season of reserves and state level competition dating back to 1919.

Club head of development Luke Power continued as reserves coach for his third season in the role. VFL-listed players newly signed to the team included: former AFL-listed senior players Denver Grainger-Barras (Hawthorn), Cooper Hamilton (GWS), Ethan Phillips (Hawthorn) and Cooper Vickery (Sydney); and Liam Farrar, Taj Logan, Zac Harding, Nash King, Stirling Phipps-Parsons, Jack Polkinghorne and Oliver Warburton. Retained from 2024 were Ollie Badr, Patrick Dozzi, Kristian Ferronato, Dane Harvey, Will Hayes, Darcy Hogg, Michael Lewis, Liam McMahon, Aiden Mills, Luke Nelson, Oliver Poole, Logan Prout, Heath Ramshaw, Flynn Riley and Archie Stevens. Liam McMahon and Heath Ramshaw were appointed co-captains following the departures of 2024 captains Lachie Young and Lachie Swaney; and Ramshaw became the sole captain when McMahon departed for the Essendon senior team in the AFL mid-season draft.

Carlton's reserves finished 13th out of 21 clubs in the 2025 VFL season, with a record of 8–10 to miss the finals by two wins and percentage. Ethan Phillips won the team's best and fairest award.

=== Women's ===
The club will field a team in the VFL Women's competition for the seventh time. Aasta O'Connor, who had been at the club as an AFL Women's assistant coach since 2022, took over from Glenn Strachan as VFL Women's senior coach; Strachan stepped back into an onfield performance and strategy role for the team. Octavia di Donato continued in her second season as captain and first as sole captain, with 2024 co-captain Eliza Wood joining the club's AFL Women's list.

Carlton finished tenth out of twelve clubs in the 2025 VFL Women's season to miss the finals, with a record of 4–10. 19-year-old Amy Trindade won the team's best and fairest award.
