= Good Friday Superclash =

Annual Australian Football League match

The Good Friday SuperClash is an annual Australian Football League (AFL) match played on Good Friday, traditionally between the North Melbourne Football Club and the Carlton Football Club. The fixture is held at Docklands Stadium (commercially Marvel Stadium) in Melbourne and is played in support of the Royal Children's Hospital Good Friday Appeal, combining elite sport with a significant charitable cause.

== History ==
The AFL had historically refrained from scheduling matches on Good Friday out of respect for its religious significance. However, after years of public interest and lobbying—particularly by North Melbourne, the league approved the first Good Friday match in 2017, which featured North Melbourne against the Western Bulldogs.

From 2017 to 2022, the fixture saw mixed results in terms of competitiveness and crowd engagement. In 2023, the AFL rebranded the game as the Good Friday SuperClash, replacing the Western Bulldogs with Carlton to boost attendance, viewership, and commercial appeal. The rebrand aimed to establish the game as a marquee event on the AFL calendar.

== Match results ==
#	Year	Home team	Score	Away team	Score	Winner	Venue	Crowd
1	2017	North Melbourne	12.14 (86)	Western Bulldogs	12.17 (89)	Western Bulldogs	Docklands Stadium	42,814
2	2018	North Melbourne	13.17 (95)	St Kilda	5.13 (43)	North Melbourne	Docklands Stadium	33,966
3	2019	North Melbourne	7.16 (58)	Essendon	17.14 (116)	Essendon	Docklands Stadium	48,278
	2020	No match played due to the COVID-19 pandemic						
4	2021	North Melbourne	5.9 (39)	Western Bulldogs	25.17 (167)	Western Bulldogs	Docklands Stadium	28,483
5	2022	North Melbourne	11.5 (71)	Western Bulldogs	21.13 (139)	Western Bulldogs	Docklands Stadium	32,162
6	2023	North Melbourne	11.18 (84)	Carlton	16.11 (107)	Carlton	Docklands Stadium	49,062
7	2024	North Melbourne	12.9 (81)	Carlton	21.11 (137)	Carlton	Docklands Stadium	47,565
8	2025	North Melbourne	11.5 (71)	Carlton	24.9 (153)	Carlton	Docklands Stadium	46,373
9	2026	North Melbourne	14.12 (96)	Carlton	13.8 (86)	North Melbourne	Docklands Stadium	45,919

== SuperClash Superhero Medal ==
The SuperClash Superhero Medal was introduced in 2025 and is awarded to the player judged best on ground in the match. The name of the medal reflects the match's association with the Royal Children's Hospital Good Friday Appeal, often themed around superheroes to celebrate the bravery of the young patients. The first recipient of the medal was George Hewett (Carlton) in the 2025 match, after a standout midfield performance in their 82-point win over North Melbourne.

Year	Medal Winner	Team
2025	George Hewett	Carlton

== Charity ==
The Good Friday SuperClash is closely associated with the Royal Children's Hospital Good Friday Appeal, a long-standing charitable initiative in Victoria aimed at raising funds for the Royal Children's Hospital (RCH) in Melbourne. The hospital is one of Australia's leading providers of pediatric healthcare, and the Good Friday Appeal has become a significant fundraising effort for the hospital, helping to support its mission to provide world-class care to sick and injured children. Since the inception of the Good Friday SuperClash in 2017, the match has played a vital role in raising both awareness and funds for the appeal.

== See also ==
- North Melbourne Football Club
- Australian Football League
- Good Friday
- Good Friday Appeal
