= SuperClash Superhero Medal =

Award in Australian rules football

- Awarded for: The best player on the ground in the Good Friday SuperClash
- Country: Australia
- Presented by: AFL
- First award: 2025
- Currently held by: George Hewett (Carlton)

The SuperClash Superhero Medal is a medal given to the player judged best on ground in each Good Friday SuperClash match played between the Carlton Football Club and the North Melbourne Football Club.

The Good Friday SuperClash, first launched in 2017, is a fundraising event and Australian Rules Football match played annually on Good Friday in collaboration with the Good Friday Appeal to raise funds for the Royal Children's Hospital in Melbourne. $5 from every ticket sold is donated towards the appeal, in addition to other fundraising work done by both participating teams.

The SuperClash Superhero Medal was first introduced in 2025. The inaugural recipient of the award was George Hewett of the Carlton Football Club.

== Recipients ==
| Year | Round | Winner | Club | Ref. |
|---|---|---|---|---|
| 2025 | Round 6 | George Hewett | Carlton | |
