= 2027 AFL draft =

General information
- Dates: TBA – Mid-season Draft; TBA – National Draft; TBA – Rookie Draft
- Location: Marvel Stadium
- Network: Fox Footy
- Sponsored by: National Australia Bank

Overview
- League: AFL

The 2027 AFL draft will consist of the various periods where the 18 clubs in the Australian Football League (AFL) can trade and recruit players during and following the completion of the 2027 AFL season.

== Tasmania concessions ==
As part of Tasmania's entry into the AFL in 2028, they have been provided with several draft concessions, including:

- being able to sign up to a total twelve 17-year-old players in 2026 and 2027 (they signed seven in 2026).
- Two mini drafts in 2027 and 2028, with two selections each. Tasmania will be able to trade those selections.
- Draft picks No.1, 3, 5, 7, 9, 11 and 13 and the first selection of each subsequent round in 2027 (picks No.5, 7, 11 and 13 must be traded or rolled forward).
- Picks No.1, 2 and 3 in the 2027 rookie draft.
- Signing up to 18 uncontracted players from rival clubs across 2027-28, with a maximum of one per club.

== Player movements ==
=== Previous trades ===
Table of previously traded selections
Rd	Orig. Club	New Club	Acquired via	Year acq.	Ref
1	Sydney	Carlton	Charlie Curnow and Will Hayward trade	2025	
1	Geelong	Essendon	Jack Bowes and Jordan Ridley trade	2026	
1	Melbourne	Port Adelaide	Finn Maginness and Hudson O'Keeffe trade	2026	
1	St Kilda	Brisbane Lions	Sam Marshall trade	2026	
1	Richmond	Port Adelaide	pick swap	2026	
1	North Melbourne	West Coast	pick swap at the 2026 National Draft	2026	
2	Carlton	Sydney	Charlie Curnow and Will Hayward trade	2025	
2	Port Adelaide	Western Bulldogs	Finn Maginness and Hudson O'Keeffe trade	2026	
2	Gold Coast	Hawthorn	Aidan Schubert and Sam Butler trade	2026	
2	North Melbourne	Port Adelaide	via Sydney (Nick Blakey trade) on-traded to Port Adelaide (pick swap at the 2026 National Draft)	2026; 2026	
2	Richmond	Brisbane Lions	via Port Adelaide (pick swap) on-traded to Greater Western Sydney (pick swap at the 2026 National Draft) on-traded to Brisbane Lions (pick swap at the 2026 National Draft)	2026; 2026; 2026	
2	Western Bulldogs	Brisbane Lions	pick swap	2026	
2	West Coast	Melbourne	Trent Rivers and Jack Viney trade	2026	
2	Melbourne	Brisbane Lions	Will McLachlan trade	2026	
2	Brisbane Lions	Melbourne	Will McLachlan trade	2026	
2	Greater Western Sydney	Hawthorn	via Port Adelaide (pick swap at the 2026 National Draft) on-traded to Hawthorn (pick swap at the 2026 National Draft)	2026; 2026	
3	West Coast	St Kilda	Liam Ryan trade	2025	
3	Gold Coast	Gold Coast	via Melbourne (Christian Petracca trade) on-traded to Western Bulldogs (Finn Maginness and Hudson O'Keeffe trade) on-traded to Hawthorn (pick swap) traded back to Gold Coast (Aidan Schubert and Sam Butler trade)	2025; 2026; 2026; 2026	
3	Melbourne	St Kilda	Jack Steele trade	2025	
3	Hawthorn	West Coast	pick swap at the 2025 National Draft	2025	
3	Port Adelaide	North Melbourne	via Hawthorn ((Finn Maginness and Hudson O'Keeffe trade)) on-traded to North Melbourne (Josh Goater trade)	2026; 2026	
4	Melbourne	St Kilda	Max Heath trade	2025	
4	Port Adelaide	Western Bulldogs	Finn Maginness and Hudson O'Keeffe trade	2026	
4	Richmond	Adelaide	via Port Adelaide (pick swap) on-traded to Adelaide (Luke Pedlar trade)	2026; 2026	
4	West Coast	Melbourne	Trent Rivers and Jack Viney trade	2026	
