= Motlop =

Motlop is a surname. Notable people with the surname include:

- Daniel Motlop (born 1982), an Australian rules footballer
- Jesse Motlop (born 2003), an Australian rules footballer
- Marlon Motlop (born 1990), an Australian rules footballer
- Shannon Motlop (born 1978), an Australian rules footballer
- Steven Motlop (born 1991), an Australian rules footballer
