= Harry O'Farrell =

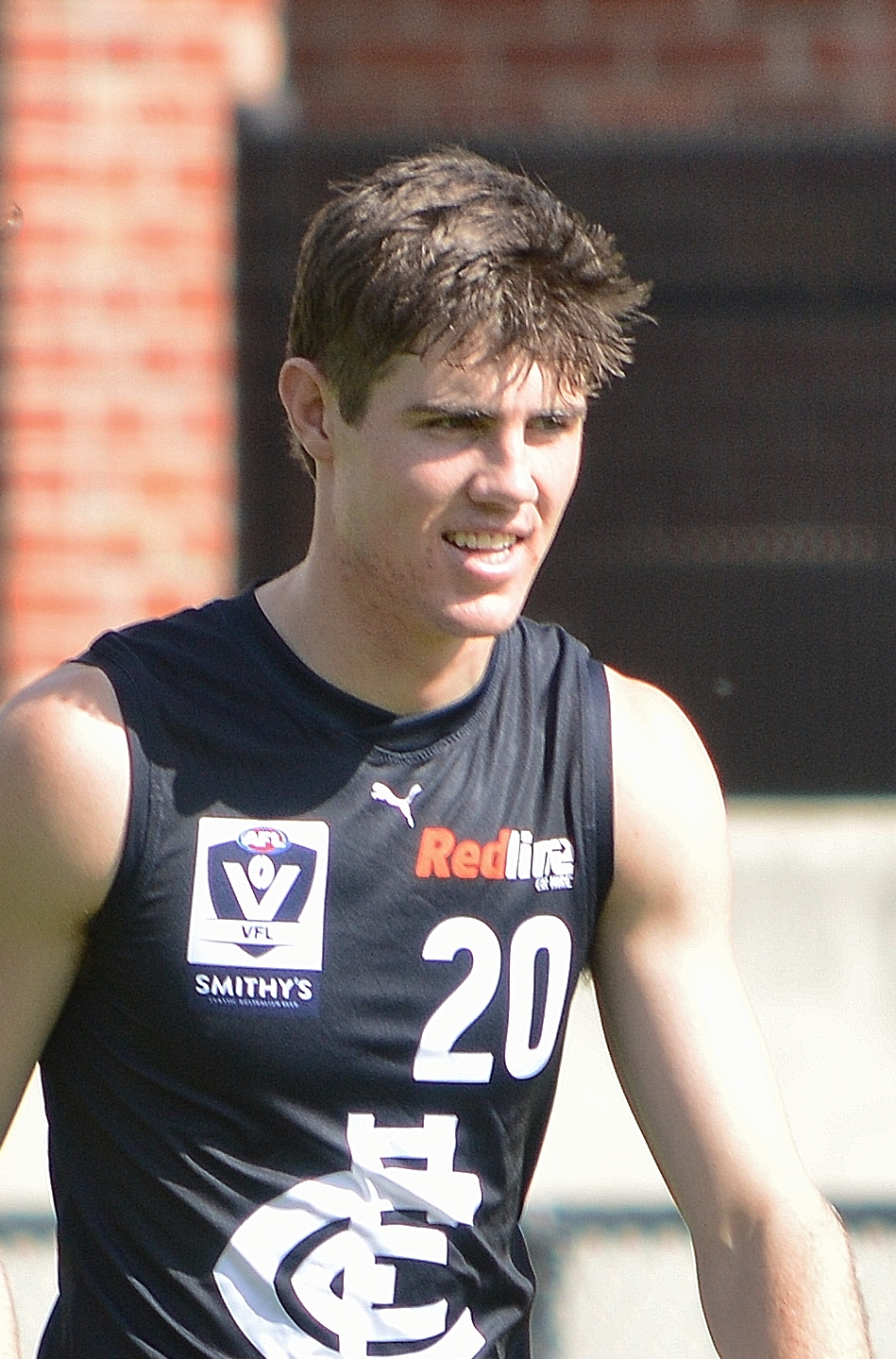
- O'Farrell with Carlton's VFL side in April 2025

Personal information
- Born: 3 May 2006 (age 20)
- Original team: Maribyrnong Park/Calder Cannons
- Draft: No. 40, 2024 AFL draft
- Debut: Round 11, 2025, Carlton vs. Greater Western Sydney, at Marvel Stadium
- Height: 197 cm (6 ft 6 in)
- Position: Key Defender

Club information
- Current club: Carlton
- Number: 22

Playing career^{1}
Years	Club	Games (Goals)
2025–	Carlton	6 (1)
- ^{1} Playing statistics correct to the end of the 2025 season.

Harry O'Farrell (born 3 May 2006) is an Australian rules footballer who plays for the Carlton Football Club in the Australian Football League (AFL).

== Junior career ==
O'Farrell played for the Calder Cannons in the Talent League. He averaged 11.3 disposals and 2.5 marks per game. O'Farrell also represented Vic Metro in the Under 18 Championships, playing one game in his draft year before suffering an ankle injury.

== AFL career ==
O'Farrell was selected by Carlton with pick 40 of the 2024 AFL draft. He was given the number 22, previously worn by Caleb Marchbank.

He earned a debut against the GWS Giants in round 11 of the 2025 AFL season. He had 2 intercept marks and 9 disposals on debut.

O'Farrell ruptured his ACL against Fremantle in round 21 of the 2025 AFL season.

== Personal life ==
Harry O'Farrell is the son of Peter O'Farrell, a lawyer who represented Carlton captain Patrick Cripps in 2022 in front of the AFL Appeals Board, and was able to overturn a two-match rough conduct ban which would have otherwise made Cripps ineligible for the 2022 Brownlow Medal, which he would go on to win.

== Statistics ==
Updated to the end of the 2025 season.

Legend
G	Goals	K	Kicks	D	Disposals	T	Tackles
B	Behinds	H	Handballs	M	Marks

Season	Team	No.	Games	Totals							Averages (per game)							Votes
Season	Team	No.	Games	G	B	K	H	D	M	T	G	B	K	H	D	M	T	Votes
2025	Carlton	22	6	1	1	43	18	61	29	9	0.2	0.2	7.2	3.0	10.2	4.8	1.5	0
Career			6	1	1	43	18	61	29	9	0.2	0.2	7.2	3.0	10.2	4.8	1.5	0
