= Scott Camporeale =

Australian rules footballer, born 1975

Personal information
- Full name: Scott Camporeale
- Born: 11 August 1975 (age 51); South Australia
- Original team: Woodville-West Torrens Eagles (SANFL)
- Height: 180 cm (5 ft 11 in)
- Weight: 80 kg (176 lb)

Playing career^{1}
Years	Club	Games (Goals)
1995–2005	Carlton	233 (200)
2006–2007	Essendon	19 (5)
Total		252 (205)

Representative team honours^{2}
Years	Team	Games (Goals)
1996-1999	South Australia	3

International team honours^{2}
1998–1999	Australia	4

Coaching career^{3}
Years	Club	Games (W–L–D)
2015	Adelaide	11 (7–4–0)
- ^{1} Playing statistics correct to the end of 2007.^{2} Representative statistics correct as of 1999.^{3} Coaching statistics correct as of 2015.

Career highlights
- AFL Premiership player: (1995); Robert Reynolds Trophy: 2000; All-Australian: 2000; 2× Carlton pre-season premiership player: 1997, 2005; AFL Rising Star nominee: 1995; VFL/AFL Italian Team of the Century: 2007

Scott Camporeale (born 11 August 1975) is a former Australian rules footballer who played with Carlton and Essendon in the Australian Football League, and coached the Adelaide Football Club in an interim capacity of caretaker senior coach following the death of senior coach Phil Walsh in 2015.

== Playing career ==
=== Carlton ===
Originally from South Australian National Football League (SANFL) club Woodville-West Torrens Eagles, Camporeale was drafted by Carlton with draft pick number 15 in the 1994 AFL draft. He quickly established himself as a quality running midfielder for Carlton and was second in the 1995 AFL Rising Star Award behind Nick Holland of Hawthorn. His speed was an important part of Carlton's 1995 premiership-winning side.

In 2000, Camporeale won Carlton's best and fairest award, the Robert Reynolds Trophy, as well as gaining All-Australian selection.

At the end of the 2005 season, Camporeale left Carlton, following his desire for a three-year contract, when Carlton would only offer a two-year contract. Carlton tried to make it difficult for him to leave, so Camporeale nominated for the 2006 Pre-season Draft. Essendon drafted Camporeale with draft pick number four in the pre-season draft. Camporeale played a total of 233 games and kicked a total 200 goals for Carlton from 1995 until 2005 and was also a member of Carlton's 1995 premiership side.

=== Essendon ===
After Camporeale nominated for the 2006 Pre-season Draft. Essendon drafted Camporeale with draft pick number four in the pre-season draft. Camporeale debuted with Essendon in round one, 2006, in which the Bombers embarrassed reigning premiers Sydney by 27 points in what was to be their only win in the first half of the season. His playing career came to an end when he suffered a right knee injury in Round 21, 2007. It occurred when he changed direction to tackle an opponent, resulting with his knee bending and twisting the wrong way. He had successful ACL surgery on the knee, but at 32 he opted to retire from his playing career. He played 19 games for Essendon in two seasons from 2006 until 2007 and kicked a total of 5 goals.

== Coaching career ==
=== Essendon Football Club ===
Camporeale was an assistant coach at Essendon from 2008 to 2010.

=== Adelaide Crows ===
In October 2010, he joined the Adelaide Crows as an assistant coach in the role of midfield coach, replacing Todd Viney. Following the death of Adelaide Crows senior coach Phil Walsh, Camporeale was appointed caretaker senior coach of the Adelaide Crows to the end of the 2015 season. Despite coaching the Crows to seven wins from his eleven matches in charge, he chose not to apply for the role full-time, with Don Pyke instead named Adelaide Crows new senior coach. Camporeale, however, remained with the Crows as assistant coach.

In October 2019, following a review into the Crows' football department, Camporeale departed the club.

== Statistics ==
=== Playing statistics ===
Legend
G	Goals	K	Kicks	D	Disposals	T	Tackles
B	Behinds	H	Handballs	M	Marks

Season	Team	No.	Games	Totals							Averages (per game)							Votes
Season	Team	No.	Games	G	B	K	H	D	M	T	G	B	K	H	D	M	T	Votes
1995†	Carlton	16	24	11	18	236	121	357	50	37	0.5	0.8	9.8	5.0	14.9	2.1	1.5	5
1996	Carlton	16	23	20	18	268	132	400	56	39	0.9	0.8	11.7	5.7	17.4	2.4	1.7	5
1997	Carlton	16	12	7	7	149	65	214	42	19	0.6	0.6	12.4	5.4	17.8	3.5	1.6	0
1998	Carlton	16	22	27	22	334	151	485	87	27	1.2	1.0	15.2	6.9	22.0	4.0	1.2	7
1999	Carlton	16	23	30	20	380	146	526	91	32	1.3	0.9	16.5	6.3	22.9	4.0	1.4	4
2000	Carlton	16	25	31	21	493	201	694	77	43	1.2	0.8	19.7	8.0	27.8	3.1	1.7	10
2001	Carlton	16	21	20	12	392	102	494	68	44	1.0	0.6	18.7	4.9	23.5	3.2	2.1	5
2002	Carlton	16	20	7	9	264	105	369	51	48	0.4	0.5	13.2	5.3	18.5	2.6	2.4	4
2003	Carlton	16	20	18	4	338	107	445	43	38	0.9	0.2	16.9	5.4	22.3	2.2	1.9	0
2004	Carlton	16	22	21	12	324	122	446	58	74	1.0	0.5	14.7	5.5	20.3	2.6	3.4	9
2005	Carlton	16	21	8	4	330	126	456	63	37	0.4	0.2	15.7	6.0	21.7	3.0	1.8	0
2006	Essendon	17	12	3	1	161	88	249	48	37	0.3	0.1	13.4	7.3	20.8	4.0	3.1	0
2007	Essendon	17	7	2	2	75	51	126	20	9	0.3	0.3	10.7	7.3	18.0	2.9	1.3	0
Career			252	205	150	3744	1517	5261	754	484	0.8	0.6	14.9	6.0	20.9	3.0	1.9	49

== Head coaching record ==
Team	Year	Home and Away Season					Finals			
Team	Year	Won	Lost	Drew	%	Position	Won	Lost	Win %	Result
ADE	2015	6 (Note: Camporeale took over as interim head coach after Phil Walsh was murdered on July 3rd. Thus, the first 12 games are credited to Walsh and the final 11, including two finals, to Camporeale.)	3	0	.667	7th out of 18	1	1	.500	Lost to Hawthorn in Semi-Final
Total		6	3	0	.667		1	1	.500	

* Interim Head Coach

== Personal life ==
Camporeale is an old scholar of St Michael's College, Adelaide.

Camporeale has two twin sons, Ben and Lucas, both of whom were drafted to Carlton as father-son selections at picks 43 and 54 respectively in the 2024 AFL draft
