= Hudson O'Keeffe =

Australian rules footballer (born 2004)

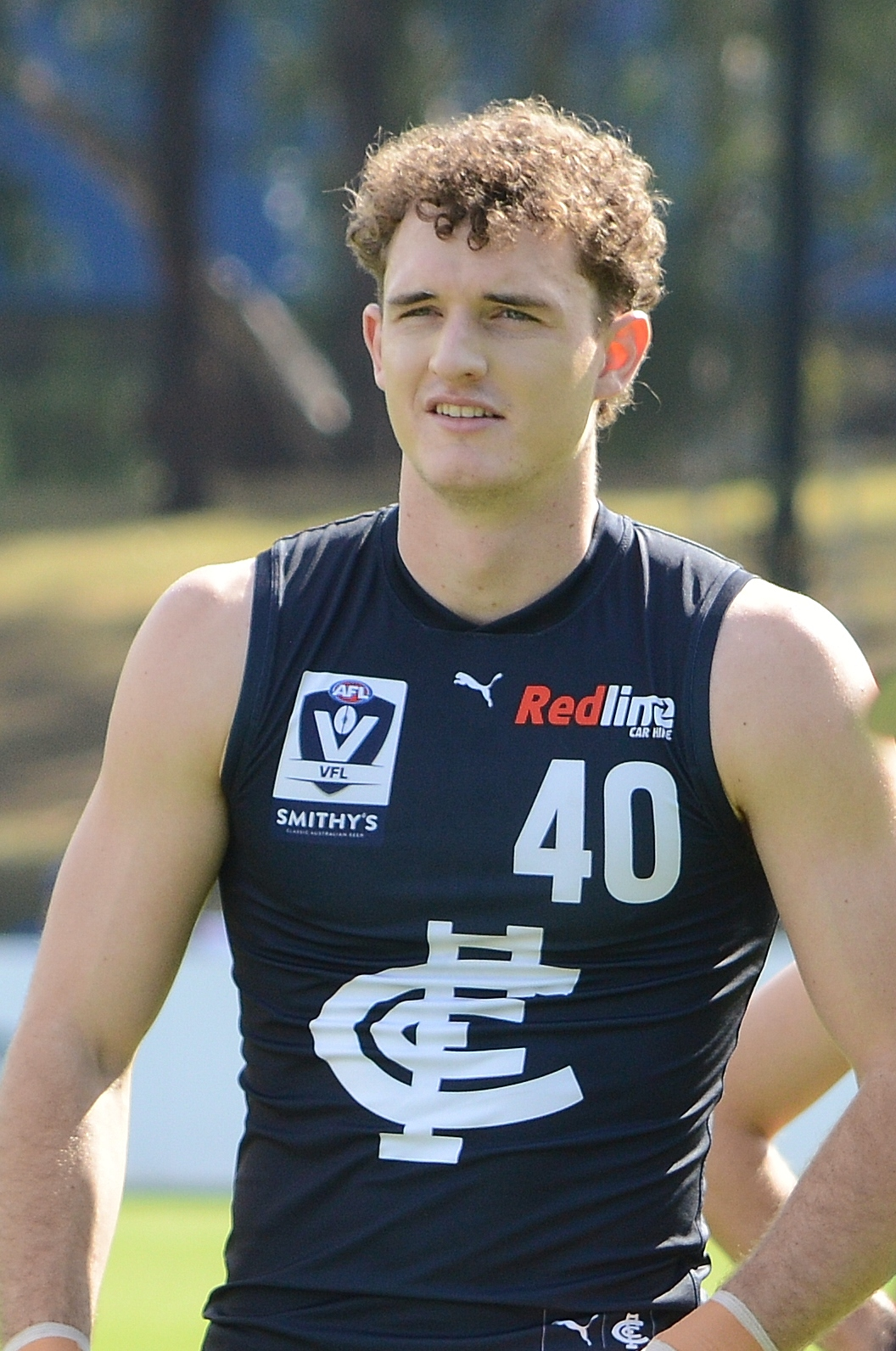
- O'Keeffe with Carlton's VFL side in April 2025

Personal information
- Nickname: Skull
- Born: 16 December 2004 (age 21)
- Original team: Oakleigh Chargers
- Draft: 2023 pre-season supplemental selection period
- Debut: Round 13, 2025, Carlton vs. Essendon, at the Melbourne Cricket Ground
- Height: 202 cm (6 ft 8 in)
- Position: Ruck/Key forward

Club information
- Current club: Western Bulldogs

Playing career^{1}
Years	Club	Games (Goals)
2023–2026	Carlton	8 (3)
2027–	Western Bulldogs	0 (0)
Total		8 (3)
- ^{1} Playing statistics correct to the end of the 2026 season.

Hudson O'Keeffe (born 16 December 2004) is an Australian rules footballer who plays for the Western Bulldogs in the Australian Football League (AFL). He previously played for the Carlton Football Club from 2023 to 2026.

== Junior career ==
O'Keeffe played in the Talent League for the Oakleigh Chargers, playing as their number one ruckman. He averaged 9 disposals and 21.7 hitouts in 2022. He was also the number one ruck for Vic Metro in the Under 18 Championships, where he averaged 8 disposals and 20 hitouts per game.

== AFL career ==
=== Carlton (2023–2026) ===
O'Keeffe was picked up by Carlton in the 2023 pre-season supplemental selection period following a long-term injury to Sam Philp.

He made his debut in round 13 of the 2025 AFL season against Essendon. He recorded 5 contested marks and 7 disposals on debut.

The next year, O'Keeffe finished the 2026 VFL season as Carlton's VFL leading goalkicker with 22 goals from 17 games.

=== Western Bulldogs (2027–) ===
At the end of the 2026 season O'Keeffe requested a trade to the Western Bulldogs, and moved to the Dogs during the first week of trade period as part of a five-club mega-deal.

== Statistics ==
Updated to the end of the 2026 season.

Legend
G	Goals	K	Kicks	D	Disposals	T	Tackles
B	Behinds	H	Handballs	M	Marks	H/O	Hit-outs

Season	Team	No.	Games	Totals								Averages (per game)								Votes
Season	Team	No.	Games	G	B	K	H	D	M	T	H/O	G	B	K	H	D	M	T	H/O	Votes
2023	Carlton	40	0	—	—	—	—	—	—	—	—	—	—	—	—	—	—	—	—	0
2024	Carlton	40	0	—	—	—	—	—	—	—	—	—	—	—	—	—	—	—	—	0
2025	Carlton	40	5	3	4	20	15	35	11	6	40	0.6	0.8	4.0	3.0	7.0	2.2	1.2	8.0	0
2026	Carlton	40	3	0	1	8	9	17	3	4	24	0.0	0.3	2.7	3.0	5.7	1.0	1.3	8.0	0
Career			8	3	5	28	24	52	14	10	64	0.4	0.6	3.5	3.0	6.5	1.8	1.3	8.0	0
