= Lucas Camporeale =

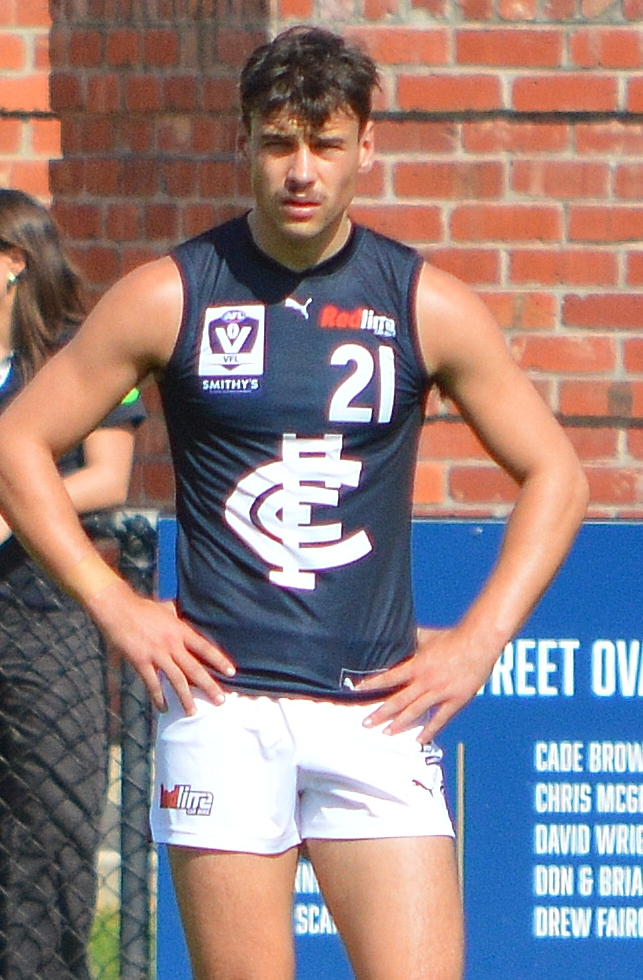
- Camporeale with Carlton's VFL side in April 2025

Personal information
- Born: 21 July 2006 (age 20)
- Original team: Brighton Bombers/Glenelg
- Draft: No. 54 (F/S), 2024 AFL draft
- Debut: Round 1, 2025, Carlton vs. Richmond, at the Melbourne Cricket Ground
- Height: 184 cm (6 ft 0 in)
- Position: Midfielder

Club information
- Current club: Carlton
- Number: 21

Playing career^{1}
| Years | Club | Games (Goals) |
| 2025– | Carlton | 3 (0) |
- ^{1} Playing statistics correct to the end of the 2025 season.

Lucas Camporeale (born 21 July 2006) is a former Australian Rules footballer who played for the Carlton Football Club in the Australian Football League (AFL).

== Junior career ==
Camporeale played in the SANFL under 18s for Glenelg in the year prior to him being drafted. He averaged 25 disposals over the course of 8 games. In addition to representing Glenelg, he also played for South Australia in the AFL U18 Championships, where he averaged 20.8 disposals.

== AFL career ==
Camporeale was bid on by Sydney with pick 54 of the 2024 AFL draft, and with Carlton matching the bid through the father-son rule.

Camporeale was selected to make his AFL debut in round 1 of the 2025 AFL season against Richmond. He had 20 touches in his first match.

== Personal life ==
Lucas Camporeale is the son of Carlton premiership player Scott Camporeale. His twin brother Ben Camporeale also plays for the Carlton football club and was selected with pick 43 in the same draft as Lucas.

== Statistics ==
Updated to the end of the 2025 season.

Legend
| G | Goals | K | Kicks | D | Disposals | T | Tackles |
| B | Behinds | H | Handballs | M | Marks |

| Season | Team | No. | Games | Totals | | | | | | | Averages (per game) | | | | | | | Votes |
| Season | Team | No. | Games | G | B | K | H | D | M | T | G | B | K | H | D | M | T | Votes |
|---|---|---|---|---|---|---|---|---|---|---|---|---|---|---|---|---|---|---|
| 2025 | Carlton | 21 | 3 | 0 | 0 | 18 | 16 | 34 | 7 | 6 | 0.0 | 0.0 | 6.0 | 5.3 | 11.3 | 2.3 | 2.0 | 0 |
| Career | | | 3 | 0 | 0 | 18 | 16 | 34 | 7 | 6 | 0.0 | 0.0 | 6.0 | 5.3 | 11.3 | 2.3 | 2.0 | 0 |
