= Good Friday Appeal =

Annual fundraising activity for the Royal Children's Hospital, Melbourne, Australia

- Founded: 13 September 1931
- Founder: Wallace Sharland, Dave McNamara, J. J. Maher, and George Sparrow.
- Type: Fundraiser
- Purpose: The Royal Children's Hospital
- Location: Melbourne
- Coordinates: 37°47′42″S 144°56′59″E
- Region served: Victoria
- Method: Telethon, collection tins, online donations, various other events
- Key people: Rebecca Cowan, director
- Website: www.goodfridayappeal.com.au
- Formerly called: Alfred Hospital Appeal, Children's Hospital Appeal
- Not-for-profit charity

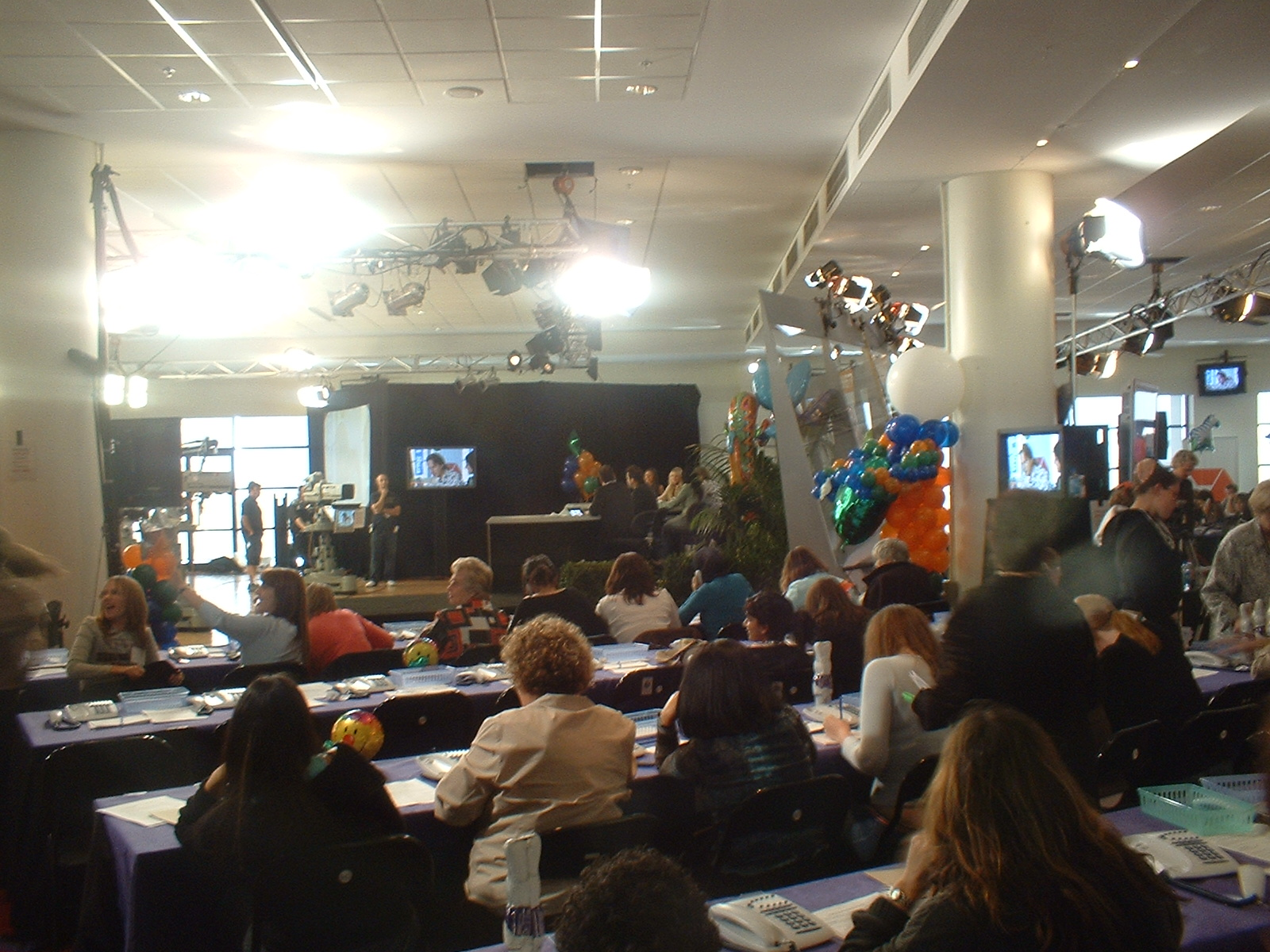
Good Friday Appeal phone room as well as Channel 7 studio setup of the telethon panel featuring personalities such as Andrew O'Keefe

The Good Friday Appeal is an annual fundraising activity on behalf of the Royal Children's Hospital, in Melbourne, Australia. The event occurs on Good Friday every year.

In 2023, the appeal raised over $23 million, setting a new record. More than $368 million has been raised for the hospital since the appeal began in 1931.

Individuals and businesses, clubs, schools and country towns throughout the state conduct activities to raise money for the hospital.

The appeal is a non-political, non-denominational organisation that exists solely to financially support The Royal Children's Hospital.

For the first time in 2014, the telethon was staged within the 2,500-seat Plenary Hall at the Melbourne Convention and Exhibition Centre (MCEC). The public were able to purchase tickets to join the live studio audience, with proceeds donated to the appeal. In 2016, the evening concert was marketed as a ticketed event via Ticketek.

The state-of-the-art MCEC complex, which is entirely undercover, also features a vast foyer area and support rooms which allowed the appeal to expand activities such as the popular Kids Day Out program and host community groups which fundraise for the hospital.

== History ==
The appeal started in 1931 when groups of journalists from The Herald and Weekly Times Ltd organised a sporting carnival in aid of Melbourne hospitals. The proceeds from the appeal initially went to different hospitals each year, but from their third-year proceeds have gone exclusively to the Melbourne Royal Children's Hospital. In 1942, Sir Keith Murdoch as managing director and editor of The Herald agreed that The Herald and radio station 3DB should broadcast an all-day appeal on Good Friday. In 1957, the Seven Network joined the appeal and presented a three-hour telethon on Good Friday afternoon. In 1960, the telethon adopted the day-long format which continues annually to this day.

During the 1960s, 1970s and 1980s, the telethon was also re-broadcast through regional Victoria via local channels, with Prime Television being the sole regional broadcaster from 1992 with the aggregation of regional markets.

== Funds raised ==
Year	Amount raised	Ref.
1931	A£427	
1932	$22,511.56 ^ (Total amount raised from 1932 to 1941)	
1933	$22,511.56 ^ (Total amount raised from 1932 to 1941)	
1934	$22,511.56 ^ (Total amount raised from 1932 to 1941)	
1935	$22,511.56 ^ (Total amount raised from 1932 to 1941)	
1936	$22,511.56 ^ (Total amount raised from 1932 to 1941)	
1937	$22,511.56 ^ (Total amount raised from 1932 to 1941)	
1938	$22,511.56 ^ (Total amount raised from 1932 to 1941)	
1939	$22,511.56 ^ (Total amount raised from 1932 to 1941)	
1940	$22,511.56 ^ (Total amount raised from 1932 to 1941)	
1941	$22,511.56 ^ (Total amount raised from 1932 to 1941)	
1942	$16,620.20 ^	
1943	$25,308.17 ^	
1944	$37,061.70 ^	
1945	$56,128.45 ^	
1946	$82,716.56 ^	
1947	$62,823.16 ^	
1948	$84,747.53 ^	
1949	$115,382.42 ^	
1950	$138,066 ^	
1951	$200,439.92 ^	
1952	$234,060.80 ^	
1953	$260,493.70 ^	
1954	$312,000 ^	
1955	$269,400.43 ^	
1956	$373,934.47 ^	
1957	$331,886.25 ^	
1958	$335,843.21 ^	
1959	$348,259.89 ^	
1960	$472,178.56 ^	
1961	$390,983.62 ^	
1962	$368,356.89 ^	
1963	$380,698.87 ^	
1964	$391,328.42 ^	
1965	$384,743.52 ^	
1966	$381,706.35	
1967	$379,940.42	
1968	$400,274.25	
1969	$457,880.23	
1970	$503,857.64	
1971	$552,918.61	
1972	$638,263.35	
1973	$778,018.77	
1974	$947,532.51	
1975	$990,224.26	
1976	$1,269,772.34	
1977	$1,489,866	
1978	$1,586,032.92	
1979	$1,724,566.64	
1980	$1,819,662.10	
1981	$2,015,342.41	
1982	$2,075,869.77	
1983	$2,121,330.32	
1984	$2,467,163.87	
1985	$2,549,188.99	
1986	$3,150,997.67	
1987	$3,161,735.84	
1988	$3,657,450.52	
1989	$4,070,206.89	
1990	$4,744,617.97	
1991	$4,424,257.53	
1992	$4,423,699.64	
1993	$4,437,744.50	
1994	$4,531,942.33	
1995	$4,624,092.47	
1996	$5,341,845.56	
1997	$5,704,378.39	
1998	$6,180,968.34	
1999	$6,425,729.76	
2000	$6,985,796	
2001	$7,501,861.33	
2002	$8,129,019.07	
2003	$9,806,373.03	
2004	$10,057,537.20	
2005	$10,082,647.20	
2006	$10,280,532.53	
2007	$11,788,970.87	
2008	$12,482,380	
2009	$13,862,495	
2010	$14,462,000	
2011	$15,600,000	
2012	$15,820,640.78	
2013	$16,405,534.65	
2014	$16,846,396.09	
2015	$17,109,063.22	
2016	$17,445,624.38	
2017	$17,605,662	
2018	$18,043,251.55	
2019	$18,175,467	
2020	$18,200,000	
2021	$17,122,879	
2022	$22,328,154	
2023	$23,061,320	
2024	$23,368,724	
2025	$23,822,792	
2026	$25,268,485	
^ denotes that the amount raised is listed in Australian dollars (A$), which has only been used since 1966. Prior to 1966 the official currency was the Australian pound (A£).

== Good Friday SuperClash ==
The Good Friday SuperClash is an annual Australian Football League (AFL) match played on Good Friday, traditionally between the North Melbourne Football Club and the Carlton Football Club. The fixture is held at Docklands Stadium (commercially Marvel Stadium) in Melbourne and is played in support of the Royal Children’s Hospital Good Friday Appeal, combining elite sport with a significant charitable cause.

The AFL, North Melbourne Football Club, Carlton Football Club, and their supporters actively contribute to the fundraising campaign through a variety of initiatives. These include in-stadium donation drives, charity auctions, and public fundraising events in the lead-up to and during the match. $5 is donated from every ticket sold at the match. Players, coaches, and club officials participate in fundraising activities, including hospital visits and telethon events, to engage the broader community and encourage donations. Special programs, such as "Superheroes on the Field," are also part of the event, with young patients from the Royal Children’s Hospital, often dressed in superhero costumes, joining the players on the field as a symbol of their strength and bravery. These symbolic moments serve to highlight the emotional connection between the AFL community and the children receiving treatment at the hospital.

== See also ==
- Royal Children's Hospital
- Herald Sun AFL premiers poster cartoonists (Proceeds to the Good Friday Appeal)
  - William Ellis Green (1954–2008; including back issues 1897–1953) – raised over $2 million
  - Mark Knight (2009–present)
