= Brodie Kemp =

Australian rules footballer

Personal information
- Full name: Brodie Kemp
- Born: 1 May 2001 (age 25)
- Original team: Echuca/Geelong Grammar/Bendigo U18
- Draft: No. 17, 2019 AFL draft
- Debut: Round 22, 2021, Carlton vs. Port Adelaide, at Adelaide Oval
- Height: 192 cm (6 ft 4 in)
- Weight: 89 kg (196 lb)
- Position: Key Forward

Club information
- Current club: Carlton
- Number: 17

Playing career^{1}
Years	Club	Games (Goals)
2020–	Carlton	74 (53)
- ^{1} Playing statistics correct to the end of the 2026 season.

Career highlights
- Carlton leading goalkicker: 2026

Brodie Kemp (born 1 May 2001) is a professional Australian rules footballer playing for the Carlton Football Club in the Australian Football League (AFL).

== Junior career ==
Kemp played junior football for the Bendigo Pioneers in the Talent League. He represented Vic Country in the Under 18 Championships. During his draft year, he was viewed as a utility with the ability to play up forward, in the midfield or in the backline.

In July 2019, Kemp ruptured his ACL while playing for his school, Geelong Grammar.

== AFL career ==
Kemp was selected by Carlton at No. 17 in the 2019 AFL draft. After multiple injuries he played 6 games across his first three seasons, before establishing himself in the backline during 2023, playing 17 games.

In round 23 of the 2024 AFL season, after injuries to key forwards Charlie Curnow and Harry McKay, Kemp was moved from defence to the forward line, where he kicked 4 goals. Following the end of the 2024 season, Kemp began training as a permanent forward. In his new role, he kicked a career-best five goals in round 3, 2025 against the Western Bulldogs, before suffering a ruptured achilles tendon two weeks later which ended his 2025 season.

In September 2025, Kemp signed a contract extension to the end of 2027. He finished the 2026 AFL season as Carlton's leading goalkicker, with 39 goals for the year.

== Statistics ==
Updated to the end of the 2026 season.

Legend
G	Goals	K	Kicks	D	Disposals	T	Tackles
B	Behinds	H	Handballs	M	Marks

Season	Team	No.	Games	Totals							Averages (per game)							Votes
Season	Team	No.	Games	G	B	K	H	D	M	T	G	B	K	H	D	M	T	Votes
2020 (Note: The 2020 season was played with 17 home-and-away matches per team (down from 22) and 16-minute quarters with time on (down from 20-minute quarters with time on) due to the impact of the COVID-19 pandemic.)	Carlton	17	0	—	—	—	—	—	—	—	—	—	—	—	—	—	—	0
2021	Carlton	17	2	0	0	14	5	19	8	3	0.0	0.0	7.0	2.5	9.5	4.0	1.5	0
2022	Carlton	17	4	0	0	28	16	44	18	2	0.0	0.0	7.0	4.0	11.0	4.5	0.5	0
2023	Carlton	17	17	1	0	182	87	269	113	28	0.1	0.0	10.7	5.1	15.8	6.6	1.6	0
2024	Carlton	17	21	6	4	195	99	294	130	46	0.3	0.2	9.3	4.7	14.0	6.2	2.2	0
2025	Carlton	17	5	7	4	28	15	43	15	11	1.4	0.8	5.6	3.0	8.6	3.0	2.2	1
2026	Carlton	17	25	39	27	183	96	279	131	50	1.6	1.1	7.3	3.8	11.2	5.2	2.0	0
Career			74	53	35	630	318	948	415	140	0.7	0.5	8.5	4.3	12.8	5.6	1.9	1
