= Will Hayward =

Australian rules footballer (born 1998)

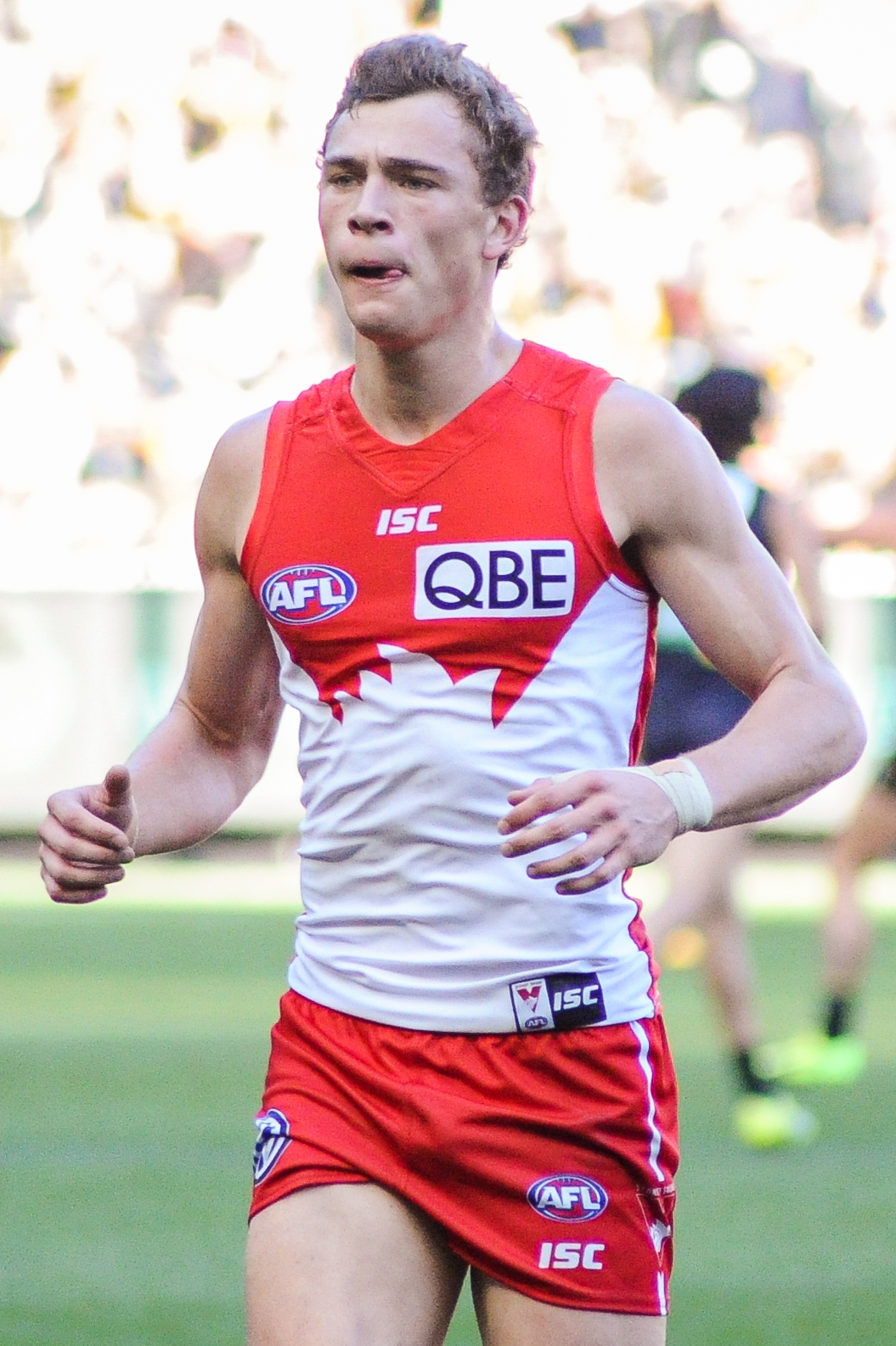
- Hayward playing for Sydney in June 2017

Personal information
- Full name: William Hayward
- Nickname: Wilbur
- Born: 26 October 1998 (age 28)
- Original team: North Adelaide (SANFL)
- Draft: No. 21, 2016 national draft
- Debut: Round 2, 2017, Sydney vs. Western Bulldogs, at Etihad Stadium
- Height: 186 cm (6 ft 1 in)
- Weight: 84 kg (185 lb)
- Position: Forward

Club information
- Current club: Carlton
- Number: 19

Playing career^{1}
| Years | Club | Games (Goals) |
| 2017–2025 | Sydney | 184 (229) |
| 2026– | Carlton | 21 (24) |
| Total | | 205 (253) |
- ^{1} Playing statistics correct to the end of round 23, 2026.

Career highlights
- AFL Rising Star nominee: 2017

William Hayward (born 26 October 1998) is a professional Australian rules footballer playing for the Carlton Football Club in the Australian Football League (AFL). He had previously played for the Sydney for nine seasons.

== AFL Playing career ==
=== Sydney Swans ===
He was drafted by Sydney with their second selection and twenty-first overall, a priority draft pick, in the 2016 national draft. He made his debut against the Western Bulldogs in the twenty-three point loss against the Western Bulldogs at Etihad Stadium in round 2, 2017.

Hayward received the AFL Rising Star nomination for round 23 after kicking three goals in the Swans' 81-point win over Carlton at the Sydney Cricket Ground.

After a great start to the 2024 season and coming out of contract, there was a lot of speculation about what he would do next. In June 2024, he signed a 5 year extension.

=== Carlton ===
At the end of the 2025 trade period, he was traded to Carlton in a trade deal for the Sydney Swans to receive Charlie Curnow. Hayward stated that he came close to joining Carlton in 2024, and he also stated that if anything were to go on, it would be the club he’d first look at.

== Statistics ==
Updated to the end of round 22, 2026.

Legend
| G | Goals | K | Kicks | D | Disposals | T | Tackles |
| B | Behinds | H | Handballs | M | Marks |

| Season | Team | No. | Games | Totals | | | | | | | Averages (per game) | | | | | | | Votes |
| Season | Team | No. | Games | G | B | K | H | D | M | T | G | B | K | H | D | M | T | Votes |
|---|---|---|---|---|---|---|---|---|---|---|---|---|---|---|---|---|---|---|
| 2017 | Sydney | 9 | 17 | 22 | 13 | 106 | 47 | 153 | 50 | 44 | 1.3 | 0.8 | 6.2 | 2.8 | 9.0 | 2.9 | 2.6 | 0 |
| 2018 | Sydney | 9 | 23 | 28 | 18 | 173 | 101 | 274 | 91 | 71 | 1.2 | 0.8 | 7.5 | 4.4 | 11.9 | 4.0 | 3.1 | 0 |
| 2019 | Sydney | 9 | 13 | 12 | 16 | 89 | 58 | 147 | 43 | 35 | 0.9 | 1.2 | 6.8 | 4.5 | 11.3 | 3.3 | 2.7 | 0 |
| 2020 (Note: The 2020 season was played with 17 home-and-away matches per team (down from 22) and 16-minute quarters with time on (down from 20-minute quarters with time on) due to the impact of the COVID-19 pandemic.) | Sydney | 9 | 16 | 10 | 3 | 87 | 74 | 161 | 54 | 37 | 0.6 | 0.2 | 5.4 | 4.6 | 10.1 | 3.4 | 2.3 | 0 |
| 2021 | Sydney | 9 | 20 | 28 | 15 | 134 | 75 | 209 | 81 | 60 | 1.4 | 0.8 | 6.7 | 3.8 | 10.5 | 4.1 | 3.0 | 2 |
| 2022 | Sydney | 9 | 25 | 34 | 22 | 198 | 103 | 301 | 112 | 74 | 1.4 | 0.9 | 7.9 | 4.1 | 12.0 | 4.5 | 3.0 | 0 |
| 2023 | Sydney | 9 | 23 | 25 | 19 | 177 | 92 | 269 | 99 | 72 | 1.1 | 0.8 | 7.7 | 4.0 | 11.7 | 4.3 | 3.1 | 1 |
| 2024 | Sydney | 9 | 26 | 41 | 16 | 201 | 115 | 316 | 115 | 66 | 1.6 | 0.6 | 7.7 | 4.4 | 12.2 | 4.4 | 2.5 | 2 |
| 2025 | Sydney | 9 | 21 | 29 | 10 | 138 | 99 | 237 | 68 | 55 | 1.4 | 0.5 | 6.6 | 4.7 | 11.3 | 3.2 | 2.6 | 3 |
| 2026 | Carlton | 19 | 20 | 21 | 16 | 191 | 138 | 329 | 113 | 38 | 1.1 | 0.8 | 9.6 | 6.9 | 16.5 | 5.7 | 1.9 | 0 |
| Career | | | 204 | 250 | 148 | 1494 | 902 | 2396 | 826 | 552 | 1.2 | 0.7 | 7.3 | 4.4 | 11.7 | 4.0 | 2.7 | 8 |

== Honours and achievements ==
Individual

- AFL Rising Star nominee: 2017 (round 23)

== Personal life ==
Hayward was educated at St Peter's College, Adelaide, starting in grade three in 2007 and completing his final year in 2016.

He played his junior football for Walkerville Junior Football Club in Adelaide’s inner east, as well as for his school.
