= George Hewett (footballer) =

Australian rules footballer

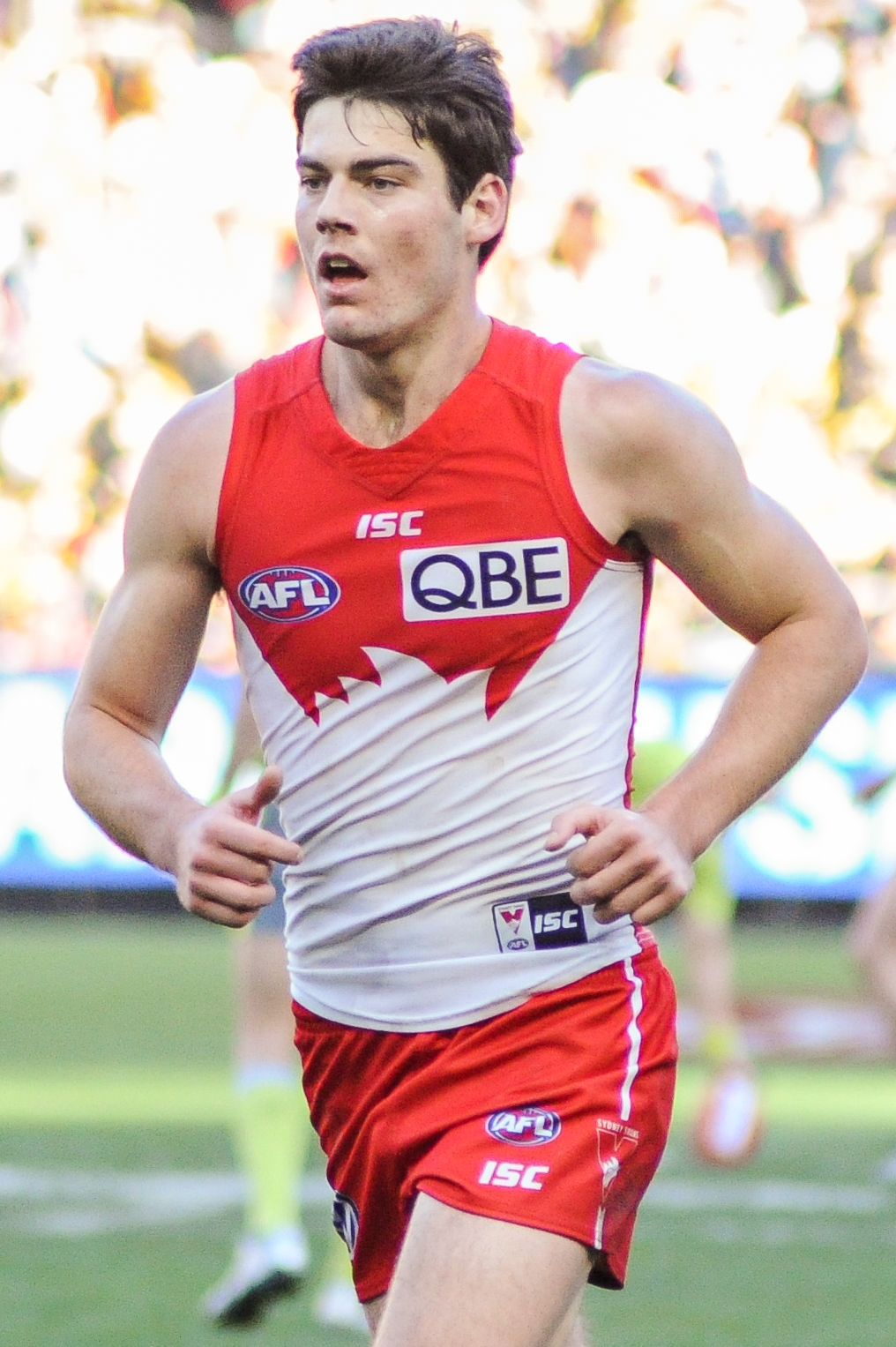
- Hewett playing for Sydney in June 2017

Personal information
- Full name: George Adrian Hewett
- Born: 29 December 1995 (age 30)
- Original team: North Adelaide (SANFL)
- Draft: No. 32, 2013 national draft
- Height: 187 cm (6 ft 2 in)
- Weight: 85 kg (187 lb)
- Position: Midfielder

Club information
- Current club: Carlton
- Number: 29

Playing career^{1}
Years	Club	Games (Goals)
2014–2021	Sydney	120 (32)
2022–	Carlton	103 (34)
Total		223 (66)
- ^{1} Playing statistics correct to the end of the 2026 season.

Career highlights
- John Nicholls Medal: 2025

George Adrian Hewett (born 29 December 1995) is a professional Australian rules footballer playing for the Carlton Football Club in the Australian Football League (AFL), having been initially drafted to the Sydney Swans. Started in Port Broughton. He was drafted with pick 32 in the 2013 AFL draft by Sydney. He attended Prince Alfred College and graduated in 2013.

== Early life ==
George Hewett grew up in Port Broughton, a small South Australian town located at the northern extent of the Yorke Peninsula on the east coast of Spencer Gulf. It is situated about 170 km north-west of Adelaide, and 56 km south of Port Pirie. He would start his football with the junior club of Broughton Mundoora Eagles in the Northern Areas competition. He then was a part of the 2011 North Adelaide Macca’s Cup Under 16 premiership team coached by club legend David Tiller. Hewett played First XVIII football for Prince Alfred College and was a member of the title-winning South Australian Under 18 team in 2013.

== AFL career ==
=== Sydney Swans (2014–2021) ===
Hewett was drafted by the Sydney Swans with their second selection and thirty-second overall. After being one of the youngest players in his draft year., Hewett spent his first two seasons on Sydney's list in the Swans NEAFL side before making his debut in the opening round of the 2016 AFL season against Collingwood. Drafted as a midfielder, Hewett moved into the forward line in order to better his chances of senior selection, being unable to break into the starting Swans midfield group. He would play all but two games that year, including the grand final. His best individual performance was against Brisbane in round six, where he kicked three goals in the first quarter. On June one, Hewett was rewarded with a two year contract extension which would see him at the club till 2018.

In the 2017 AFL Season, Hewett begun to play more midfield minutes and was tasked most weeks to be the Swans' tagger. Hewett had a stand out tagging performance in round twelve when he kept reigning Norm Smith Medalist, Jason Johannisen, to a season low nine disposals and 170 metes gained.

In the 2018 AFL Season, Hewett reached his fiftieth AFL game against Port Adelaide in round two. He had 20 disposals as Sydney lost to Port Adelaide. At the end of the year Hewett signed another two year contract that would keep him at the club until the end of 2020. Sydney head of football Tom Harley gave praise to the young midfield and was quoted as saying, "The fact that George didn’t debut until his third year with the Swans is a credit to his character and resilience, he is an extremely trusted and respected member of the playing group."

=== Carlton (2022–present) ===
After eight years with the Swans, Hewett exercised his rights as a free agent and joined Carlton at the conclusion of the 2021 AFL season. He became a key part of Carlton's inside midfield team upon joining the Blues, and finished fifth in the club's best and fairest in his first season.

Hewett capped off a career-best year at the conclusion of the 2025 AFL season by claiming the John Nicholls Medal as the club's best and fairest. Hewett was Carlton's most consistent performer across the season, where he averaged 28.1 disposals, 13.3 contested possessions, 6.5 clearances and 5.7 tackles per game to solidify his standing as captain Patrick Cripps' main partner in the midfield.

== Statistics ==
Updated to the end of the 2026 season.

Legend
G	Goals	K	Kicks	D	Disposals	T	Tackles
B	Behinds	H	Handballs	M	Marks	H/O	Hit-outs

Season	Team	No.	Games	Totals								Averages (per game)								Votes
Season	Team	No.	Games	G	B	K	H	D	M	T	H/O	G	B	K	H	D	M	T	H/O	Votes
2014	Sydney	29	0	—	—	—	—	—	—	—	—	—	—	—	—	—	—	—	—	0
2015	Sydney	29	0	—	—	—	—	—	—	—	—	—	—	—	—	—	—	—	—	0
2016	Sydney	29	24	18	8	148	163	311	68	84	3	0.8	0.3	6.2	6.8	13.0	2.8	3.5	0.1	0
2017	Sydney	29	24	9	6	199	250	449	86	115	0	0.4	0.3	8.3	10.4	18.7	3.6	4.8	0.0	0
2018	Sydney	29	23	3	3	170	259	429	51	90	0	0.1	0.1	7.4	11.3	18.7	2.2	3.9	0.0	3
2019	Sydney	29	22	1	0	190	291	481	56	98	0	0.0	0.0	8.6	13.2	21.9	2.5	4.5	0.0	2
2020 (Note: The 2020 season was played with 17 home-and-away matches per team (down from 22) and 16-minute quarters with time on (down from 20-minute quarters with time on) due to the impact of the COVID-19 pandemic.)	Sydney	29	6	1	0	29	54	83	11	18	0	0.2	0.0	4.8	9.0	13.8	1.8	3.0	0.0	0
2021	Sydney	29	21	0	0	160	216	376	74	71	0	0.0	0.0	7.6	10.3	17.9	3.5	3.4	0.0	1
2022	Carlton	29	15	4	5	170	257	427	51	73	0	0.3	0.3	11.3	17.1	28.5	3.4	4.9	0.0	4
2023	Carlton	29	22	3	1	182	263	445	49	102	0	0.1	0.0	8.3	12.0	20.2	2.2	4.6	0.0	5
2024	Carlton	29	22	7	1	235	279	514	61	101	0	0.3	0.0	10.7	12.7	23.4	2.8	4.6	0.0	3
2025	Carlton	29	23	7	5	254	393^{†}	647	70	131	0	0.3	0.2	11.0	17.1	28.1	3.0	5.7	0.0	10
2026	Carlton	29	21	13	9	226	270	496	86	89	0	0.6	0.4	10.8	12.9	23.6	4.1	4.2	0.0	13
Career			223	66	38	1963	2695	4658	663	972	3	0.3	0.2	8.8	12.1	20.9	3.0	4.4	0.0	41
