= List of AFL debuts in 2016 =

The following is the list of players in the Australian Football League (AFL) who have either made their AFL debut or played for a new club during the 2016 AFL season.

== Summary ==
Summary of debuts in 2016
Club	AFL debuts	Change of club
Adelaide	3	1
Brisbane Lions	9	3
Carlton	3	7
Collingwood	6	3
Essendon	5	13
Fremantle	3	0
Geelong	2	4
Gold Coast	6	4
Greater Western Sydney	3	1
Hawthorn	6	1
Melbourne	5	2
North Melbourne	2	2
Port Adelaide	5	2
Richmond	7	2
St Kilda	3	0
Sydney	7	2
West Coast	2	3
Western Bulldogs	4	2
Total	81	52

== AFL debuts ==
Name	Club	Age at debut	Debut round	Notes
Daniel Rioli	Richmond	18 years, 343 days	1	Pick 15 (2015 national draft), round 22 2016 Rising Star nomination
Jacob Weitering	Carlton	18 years, 122 days	1	Pick 1 (2015 national draft), round 3 2016 Rising Star nomination
Clayton Oliver	Melbourne	18 years, 248 days	1	Pick 4 (2015 national draft), round 1 2016 Rising Star nomination
Callum Ah Chee	Gold Coast	18 years, 169 days	1	Pick 8 (2015 national draft)
Anthony McDonald-Tipungwuti	Essendon	22 years, 339 days	1	Pick 22 (2016 rookie draft)
Darcy Parish	Essendon	18 years, 245 days	1	Pick 5 (2015 national draft), round 2 2016 Rising Star nomination
Mitch McGovern	Adelaide	21 years, 167 days	1	Pick 43 (2014 national draft)
Wayne Milera	Adelaide	18 years, 194 days	1	Pick 11 (2015 national draft)
George Hewett	Sydney	20 years, 88 days	1	Pick 32 (2013 national draft)
Callum Mills	Sydney	18 years, 359 days	1	Pick 3 (2015 national draft), academy selection, round 16 2016 Rising Star nomination
Tom Papley	Sydney	19 years, 257 days	1	Pick 14 (2016 rookie draft), round 5 2016 Rising Star nomination
Marcus Adams	Western Bulldogs	22 years, 271 days	1	Pick 35 (2015 national draft)
Josh Dunkley	Western Bulldogs	19 years, 79 days	1	Pick 25 (2015 national draft), round 20 2016 Rising Star nomination
Jade Gresham	St Kilda	18 years, 216 days	1	Pick 18 (2015 national draft)
Josh Schache	Brisbane Lions	18 years, 219 days	1	Pick 2 (2015 national draft)
Marc Pittonet	Hawthorn	19 years, 299 days	1	Pick 50 (2014 national draft)
Jayden Short	Richmond	20 years, 69 days	2	Pick 11 (2015 rookie draft)
Dougal Howard	Port Adelaide	20 years, 9 days	2	Pick 56 (2014 national draft)
Michael Hartley	Essendon	20 years, 300 days	2	Pick 68 (2015 national draft), previously rookie listed by Collingwood
Charlie Curnow	Carlton	19 years, 61 days	2	Pick 12 (2014 national draft)
Darcy Byrne-Jones	Port Adelaide	20 years, 201 days	3	Pick 52 (2013 national draft)
Matthew Goodyear	Collingwood	19 years, 264 days	3	Pick 48 (2014 national draft)
Josh Wagner	Melbourne	21 years, 291 days	3	Pick 6 (2016 rookie draft)
Tom Ruggles	Geelong	23 years, 351 days	3	Pick 44 (2016 rookie draft))
Jayden Hunt	Melbourne	21 years, 14 days	4	Pick 57 (2013 national draft)
Darcy Tucker	Fremantle	19 years, 93 days	5	Pick 27 (2015 national draft)
Mason Cox	Collingwood	25 years, 44 days	5	Pick 60 (2015 rookie draft), international selection
Josh Smith	Collingwood	22 years, 115 days	5	Pick 25 (2016 rookie draft)
Christian Petracca	Melbourne	20 years, 118 days	6	Pick 2 (2014 national draft), round 9 2016 Rising Star nomination
Kieran Lovell	Hawthorn	18 years, 352 days	6	Pick 22 (2015 national draft)
Jason Castagna	Richmond	19 years, 293 days	6	Pick 29 (2014 rookie draft)
Mackenzie Willis	Gold Coast	20 years, 267 days	6	Pick 52 (2015 national draft)
Aliir Aliir	Sydney	21 years, 239 days	6	Pick 44 (2013 national draft)
Ben Keays	Brisbane Lions	19 years, 69 days	6	Pick 24 (2015 national draft), academy selection
Kaiden Brand	Hawthorn	22 years, 030 days	7	Pick 66 (2012 national draft)
Ben Crocker	Collingwood	19 years, 79 days	7	Pick 65 (2015 national draft)
Mason Redman	Essendon	18 years, 255 days	7	Pick 30 (2015 national draft)
Darcy Macpherson	Gold Coast	18 years, 191 days	7	Pick 21 (2016 rookie draft)
Jacob Hopper	Greater Western Sydney	19 years, 99 days	8	Pick 7 (2015 national draft), academy selection, round 8 2016 Rising Star nomination
Jack Hiscox	Sydney	21 years, 54 days	8	Pick 38 (2014 national draft), academy selection
Bailey Williams	Western Bulldogs	18 years, 218 days	8	Pick 48 (2015 national draft)
Rhys Mathieson	Brisbane Lions	19 years, 134 days	9	Pick 39 (2015 national draft)
Kieran Collins	Western Bulldogs	18 years, 160 days	9	Pick 26 (2015 national draft)
Harrison Marsh	Sydney	22 years, 136 days	10	Pick 44 (2012 national draft)
Sam Collins	Fremantle	21 years, 348 days	10	Pick 55 (2015 national draft)
Tom Cole	West Coast	19 years, 1 day	10	Pick 36 (2015 national draft)
Kade Stewart	Hawthorn	19 years, 141 days	11	Pick 36 (2016 rookie draft)
Jarrad Jansen	Brisbane Lions	21 years, 35 days	11	Traded in (2016 trade period), previously listed by Geelong
Jesse Joyce	Gold Coast	18 years, 292 days	11	Pick 67 (2016 rookie draft)
Logan Austin	Port Adelaide	20 years, 333 days	11	Pick 69 (2014 national draft)
Lewis Pierce	St Kilda	21 years, 209 days	12	Pick 75 (2012 national draft)
Tom Phillips	Collingwood	20 years, 38 days	12	Pick 58 (2015 national draft)
Corey Wagner	North Melbourne	19 years, 88 days	13	Pick 43 (2015 national draft)
Eric Hipwood	Brisbane Lions	18 years, 279 days	13	Pick 14 (2015 national draft), academy selection
Matthew Kennedy	Greater Western Sydney	19 years, 76 days	13	Pick 13 (2015 national draft), academy selection
Nathan Broad	Richmond	23 years, 73 days	14	Pick 67 (2015 national draft)
Matthew Hammelmann	Brisbane Lions	20 years, 110 days	14	Pick 75 (2015 rookie draft), academy selection
Jack Silvagni	Carlton	18 years, 198 days	15	Pick 53 (2015 national draft), son of Stephen Silvagni
Reuben William	Brisbane Lions	18 years, 191 days	16	Pick 20 (2015 national draft)
Oleg Markov	Richmond	20 years, 63 days	16	Pick 50 (2015 national draft)
Ryan Clarke	North Melbourne	19 years, 25 days	16	Pick 31 (2015 national draft), round 18 2016 Rising Star nomination
Harrison Himmelberg	Greater Western Sydney	20 years, 71 days	17	Pick 16 (2015 national draft)
Jordan Foote	Sydney	20 years, 204 days	18	Pick 76 (2014 national draft)
Josh Schoenfeld	Gold Coast	19 years, 20 days	18	Pick 34 (2015 national draft)
Shane Yarran	Fremantle	27 years, 53 days	18	Pick 61 (2015 national draft)
Sam Menegola	Geelong	24 years, 139 days	18	Pick 66 (2015 national draft)
Aaron Francis	Essendon	18 years, 349 days	18	Pick 6 (2015 national draft)
Adam Marcon	Richmond	24 years, 2 days	19	Pick 47 (2016 rookie draft)
Blake Hardwick	Hawthorn	19 years, 177 days	19	Pick 44 (2015 national draft)
Rupert Wills	Collingwood	23 years, 73 days	19	Pick 63 (2015 national draft)
Malcolm Karpany	West Coast	21 years, 61 days	19	Pick 31 (2013 national draft)
Archie Smith	Brisbane Lions	21 years, 11 days	19	Pick 69 (2014 rookie draft)
Kurt Heatherley	Hawthorn	21 years, 219 days	20	Pick 61 (2014 rookie draft)
Sam Weideman	Melbourne	19 years, 43 days	20	Pick 9 (2015 national draft), son of Mark Weideman, grandson of Murray Weideman
Reilly O'Brien	Adelaide	20 years, 352 days	20	Pick 9 (2015 rookie draft)
David Cuningham	Carlton	19 years, 138 days	21	Pick 23 (2015 national draft)
Ryan Burton	Hawthorn	19 years, 196 days	21	Pick 19 (2015 national draft)
Jesse Palmer	Port Adelaide	19 years, 301 days	21	Pick 78 (2014 national draft)
Jake Long	Essendon	20 years, 194 days	21	Pick 47 (2015 rookie draft), son of Michael Long
Callum Moore	Richmond	19 years, 352 days	22	Pick 12 (2016 rookie draft)
Brayden Fiorini	Gold Coast	18 years, 364 days	22	Pick 20 (2015 national draft)
Josh Clayton	Brisbane Lions	20 years, 218 days	22	Pick 86 (2014 national draft), son of Scott Clayton
Riley Bonner	Port Adelaide	19 years, 175 days	23	Pick 37 (2015 national draft)
Will Snelling	Port Adelaide	19 years, 21 days	23	Pick 10 (2016 rookie draft)
Brandon White	St Kilda	19 years, 229 days	23	Pick 40 (2015 national draft)

== Change of AFL club ==
Name	Club	Age at debut	Debut round	Former clubs	Recruiting method
Jacob Townsend	Richmond	22 years, 278 days	1	Greater Western Sydney	traded in 2015
Jed Lamb	Carlton	23 years, 157 days	1	Sydney & Greater Western Sydney	traded in 2015
Sam Kerridge	Carlton	22 years, 333 days	1	Adelaide	traded in 2015
Matthew Wright	Carlton	26 years, 101 days	1	Adelaide	signed as a delisted free agent in 2015
Andrew Phillips	Carlton	24 years, 265 days	1	Greater Western Sydney	traded in 2015
Tomas Bugg	Melbourne	22 years, 356 days	1	Greater Western Sydney	traded in 2015
Ben Kennedy	Melbourne	22 years, 23 days	1	Collingwood	traded in 2015
Steve Johnson	Greater Western Sydney	32 years, 266 days	1	Geelong	traded in 2015
Matt Rosa	Gold Coast	29 years, 124 days	1	West Coast	traded in 2015
Ryan Davis	Gold Coast	26 years, 293 days	1	West Coast	pick 38, (2016 rookie draft)
Matt Dea	Essendon	24 years, 165 days	1	Richmond	Essendon top-up signings in 2015
Mitch Brown	Essendon	25 years, 211 days	1	Geelong	pick 54, (2015 national draft)
Mathew Stokes	Essendon	31 years, 125 days	1	Geelong	Essendon top-up signings in 2015
Jonathan Simpkin	Essendon	28 years, 150 days	1	Hawthorn	Essendon top-up signings in 2015
Matthew Leuenberger	Essendon	27 years, 293 days	1	Brisbane Lions	signed as a restricted free agent in 2015
Ryan Crowley	Essendon	32 years, 21 days	1	Fremantle	Essendon top-up signings in 2015
Craig Bird	Essendon	27 years, 66 days	1	Sydney	traded in 2015
James Kelly	Essendon	32 years, 88 days	1	Geelong	Essendon top-up signings in 2015
Jed Anderson	North Melbourne	22 years, 54 days	1	Hawthorn	traded in 2015
Paul Seedsman	Adelaide	24 years, 66 days	1	Collingwood	traded in 2015
Michael Talia	Sydney	23 years, 45 days	1	Western Bulldogs	traded in 2015
Callum Sinclair	Sydney	26 years, 185 days	1	West Coast	traded in 2015
Adam Treloar	Collingwood	23 years, 17 days	1	Greater Western Sydney	traded in 2015
Matt Suckling	Western Bulldogs	27 years, 246 days	1	Hawthorn	signed as an unrestricted free agent in 2015
Charlie Dixon	Port Adelaide	25 years, 186 days	1	Gold Coast	traded in 2015
Jack Redden	West Coast	25 years, 109 days	1	Brisbane Lions	traded in 2015
Josh Walker	Brisbane Lions	23 years, 136 days	1	Geelong	traded in 2015
Ryan Bastinac	Brisbane Lions	24 years, 279 days	1	North Melbourne	traded in 2015
Tom Bell	Brisbane Lions	24 years, 288 days	1	Carlton	traded in 2015
Lachie Henderson	Geelong	26 years, 105 days	1	Brisbane Lions & Carlton	traded in 2015
Patrick Dangerfield	Geelong	25 years, 358 days	1	Adelaide	traded in 2015
Zac Smith	Geelong	26 years, 36 days	1	Gold Coast	traded in 2015
James Aish	Collingwood	20 years, 145 days	2	Brisbane Lions	traded in 2015
Jimmy Toumpas	Port Adelaide	22 years, 92 days	2	Melbourne	traded in 2015
Lewis Jetta	West Coast	26 years, 335 days	2	Sydney	traded in 2015
Jeremy Howe	Collingwood	25 years, 285 days	3	Melbourne	traded in 2015
Andrew Moore	Richmond	24 years, 321 days	4	Port Adelaide	signed as a delisted free agent in 2015
Liam Sumner	Carlton	22 years, 224 days	4	Greater Western Sydney	traded in 2015
Lachie Plowman	Carlton	21 years, 218 days	4	Greater Western Sydney	traded in 2015
Jed Adcock	Western Bulldogs	30 years, 153 days	4	Brisbane Lions	traded in 2015
Jarrad Grant	Gold Coast	26 years, 292 days	5	Western Bulldogs	signed as a delisted free agent in 2015
Daniel Currie	Gold Coast	27 years, 69 days	5	North Melbourne	traded in 2015
Sam Grimley	Essendon	25 years, 114 days	5	Hawthorn	Essendon top-up signings in 2015
James Polkinghorne	Essendon	27 years, 102 days	6	Brisbane Lions	Essendon top-up signings in 2015
Nathan Grima	Essendon	30 years, 267 days	7	North Melbourne	Essendon top-up signings in 2015
Daniel Gorringe	Carlton	23 years, 354 days	9	Gold Coast	signed as a delisted free agent in 2015
Farren Ray	North Melbourne	30 years, 61 days	9	Western Bulldogs & St Kilda	pick 15, (2016 rookie draft)
Mark Jamar	Essendon	32 years, 293 days	10	Melbourne	Essendon top-up signings in 2015
Jonathan Giles	West Coast	28 years, 163 days	13	Greater Western Sydney & Essendon	traded in 2015
Sam Michael	Essendon	23 years, 5 days	16	Brisbane Lions	Essendon top-up signings in 2015
Scott Selwood	Geelong	26 years, 135 days	20	West Coast	signed as a restricted free agent in 2015
Jack Fitzpatrick	Hawthorn	25 years, 65 days	23	Melbourne	traded in 2015
