= 2015 AFL Under 18 Championships =

Youth Australian rules football competition

- Teams: 8

Division 1
- Teams: 4
- Champions: Victoria Country
- Larke Medal: Josh Schache

Division 2
- Teams: 4
- Champions: Queensland
- Hunter Harrison Medal: Ben Keays

The 2015 NAB AFL Under 18 Championships was the 20th edition of the AFL Under 18 Championships. Eight teams competed in the championships: Victoria Metro, Victoria Country, South Australia and Western Australia in division one, and New South Wales/Australian Capital Territory (NSW/ACT), Northern Territory, Queensland and Tasmania competed in division two. The competition was played over six rounds across two divisions.

Victoria Country won the division one title, and Queensland were the champions of division two. Both teams finished the championships undefeated.

== Fixture ==
=== Division 1 ===
	Round 1
Saturday, 23 May (11:00am)	Western jAustralia 11.7 (73)	def.	South Australia 9.18 (72)	Domain Stadium	Report
Sunday, 24 May (11:00am)	Victoria Metro 10.8 (68)	def. by	Victoria Country 11.7 (73)	Simonds Stadium	Report

	Round 2
Saturday, 30 May (10:45am)	South Australia 13.15 (93)	def.	Victoria Metro 10.8 (68)	AAMI Stadium	Report
Sunday, 31 May (12:00pm)	Western Australia 5.9 (39)	def. by	Victoria Country 21.18 (144)	Medibank Stadium	Report
Victoria Country's Josh Schache kicked 8 goals.

	Round 3
Saturday, 6 June (12:00pm)	South Australia 18.15 (123)	def.	Western Australia 7.8 (50)	AAMI Stadium	Report
Sunday, 7 June (12:00pm)	Victoria Country 14.14 (98)	def.	Victoria Metro 9.9 (63)	Simonds Stadium	Report

	Round 4
Saturday, 13 June (11:20am)	Western Australia 7.5 (47)	def. by	Victoria Metro 19.7 (121)	Domain Stadium	Report
Sunday, 14 June (11:00am)	South Australia 9.9 (63)	def. by	Victoria Country 13.13 (91)	AAMI Stadium	Report

	Round 5
Friday, 26 June (12:35pm)	Victoria Country 11.6 (72)	def.	South Australia 9.7 (61)	Simonds Stadium	Report
Friday, 26 June (2:35pm)	Victoria Metro 7.12 (54)	def. by	Western Australia 11.6 (72)	Simonds Stadium	Report

	Round 6
Wednesday, 1 July (5:05pm)	Victoria Metro 10.6 (66)	def.	South Australia 8.13 (61)	Etihad Stadium	Report
Thursday, 2 July (1:15pm)	Victoria Country 8.15 (63)	def.	Western Australia 4.7 (31)	Simonds Stadium	Report

=== Division 2 ===
	Round 1
Saturday, 20 June (10:00am)	NSW/ACT 10.10 (70)	def. by	Tasmania 10.12 (72)	Fankhauser Reserve	Report
Saturday, 20 June (12:30pm)	Queensland 17.10 (112)	def.	Northern Territory 5.10 (40)	Fankhauser Reserve	Report

	Round 2
Saturday, 27 June (12:00pm)	Tasmania 4.3 (27)	def. by	Queensland 8.18 (66)	Simonds Stadium	Report
Saturday, 27 June (2:10pm)	NSW/ACT 14.10 (94)	def.	Northern Territory 9.3 (57)	Simonds Stadium	Report

	Round 3
Wednesday, 1 July (3:05pm)	Northern Territory 9.6 (60)	def. by	Tasmania 11.7 (73)	Etihad Stadium	Report
Thursday, 2 July (11:05am)	NSW/ACT 2.10 (22)	def. by	Queensland 8.12 (60)	Simonds Stadium	Report

== All-Australian team ==
The All-Australian team was selected by Kevin Sheehan (AFL national and international talent manager), Brenton Sanderson (AFL Academy head coach), Michael Ablett (AFL talent football manager), Lenny Hayes (football projects officer), Michael Agresta (recruiting manager, Sydney), Merv Keane (recruiting manager, Essendon), Dom Milesi (recruiting manager, Collingwood), Chris Drain (recruiting manager, Port Adelaide), and Simon Dalrymple (recruiting manager, Western Bulldogs).

2015 Under 18 All-Australian team
B:	Nick O'Kearney (VM)	Kieran Collins (VC)	Eric Hipwood (QLD)
HB:	Jarrod Berry (VC)	Jacob Weitering (VC)	Riley Bonner (SA)
C:	Ben Keays (QLD)	Jacob Hopper (NSW/ACT)	Kieran Lovell (TAS)
HF:	Darcy Parish (VC)	Aaron Francis (SA)	Harley Balic (VM)
F:	Ben Ainsworth (VC)	Josh Schache (VC)	Jade Gresham (VM)
Foll:	Gach Nyuon (VC)	Rhys Mathieson (VC)	Luke Partington (SA)
Int:	Jacob Allison (QLD)	Will Snelling (SA)	Brandon Parfitt (NT)
Int:	Sam Petrevski-Seton (WA)		
Coach:	Paul Henriksen (VC)		
