= 2020 All-Australian team =

Honorary Australian rules football team

The 2020 All-Australian team represents the best performed Australian Football League (AFL) players during the 2020 season. It was announced on 24 September as a complete Australian rules football team of 22 players. The team is honorary and does not play any games.

== Selection panel ==
The selection panel for the 2020 All-Australian team consisted of chairman Gillon McLachlan, Kevin Bartlett, Luke Darcy, Steve Hocking, Glen Jakovich, Chris Johnson, Cameron Ling, Matthew Richardson and Warren Tredrea.

== Team ==
=== Initial squad ===
The initial 40-man All-Australian squad was announced on 22 September. Geelong and Port Adelaide each had the most players selected in the initial squad, with five, while Collingwood and West Coast each had four. Adelaide, Gold Coast and North Melbourne were the only clubs not to have a single player nominated in the squad. Ten players from the 2019 team were among those selected.

Club	Total	Player(s)
Adelaide	0	
Brisbane Lions	3	Harris Andrews, Hugh McCluggage, Lachie Neale
Carlton	1	Jacob Weitering
Collingwood	4	Taylor Adams, Brayden Maynard, Darcy Moore, Scott Pendlebury
Essendon	1	Jordan Ridley
Fremantle	3	Nat Fyfe, Luke Ryan, Matthew Taberner
Geelong	5	Mark Blicavs, Patrick Dangerfield, Cameron Guthrie, Tom Hawkins, Sam Menegola
Gold Coast	0	
Greater Western Sydney	1	Nick Haynes
Hawthorn	1	Jack Gunston
Melbourne	3	Max Gawn, Clayton Oliver, Christian Petracca
North Melbourne	0	
Port Adelaide	5	Travis Boak, Zak Butters, Darcy Byrne-Jones, Charlie Dixon, Tom Jonas
Richmond	3	Dylan Grimes, Dustin Martin, Nick Vlastuin
St Kilda	2	Dan Butler, Jack Steele
Sydney	1	Tom Papley
West Coast	4	Andrew Gaff, Nic Naitanui, Liam Ryan, Brad Sheppard
Western Bulldogs	3	Marcus Bontempelli, Caleb Daniel, Jack Macrae

=== Final team ===
Geelong, Port Adelaide, West Coast and the Western Bulldogs each had the most selections with three, with eleven clubs represented overall. Geelong midfielder Patrick Dangerfield, who achieved his record-equalling eighth All-Australian selection, was announced as the All-Australian captain, with former Port Adelaide captain Travis Boak announced as vice-captain. The team saw twelve players selected in an All-Australian team for the first time in their careers, while seven players from the 2019 team were among those selected.

2020 All-Australian team
B:	Brad Sheppard (West Coast)	Harris Andrews (Brisbane Lions)	Luke Ryan (Fremantle)
HB:	Nick Haynes (Greater Western Sydney)	Darcy Moore (Collingwood)	Darcy Byrne-Jones (Port Adelaide)
C:	Jack Macrae (Western Bulldogs)	Travis Boak (Port Adelaide) (vice-captain)	Cameron Guthrie (Geelong)
HF:	Patrick Dangerfield (Geelong) (captain)	Charlie Dixon (Port Adelaide)	Marcus Bontempelli (Western Bulldogs)
F:	Liam Ryan (West Coast)	Tom Hawkins (Geelong)	Dustin Martin (Richmond)
Foll:	Nic Naitanui (West Coast)	Christian Petracca (Melbourne)	Lachie Neale (Brisbane Lions)
Int:	Jack Steele (St Kilda)	Taylor Adams (Collingwood)	Caleb Daniel (Western Bulldogs)
Int:	Max Gawn (Melbourne)		
Coach:	Damien Hardwick (Richmond)		

Note: the position of coach in the All-Australian team is traditionally awarded to the coach of the premiership team.
