= 2022 All-Australian team =

Honorary Australian rules football team

The 2022 All-Australian team represents the best performed Australian Football League (AFL) players during the 2022 season. It was announced on 24 August as a complete Australian rules football team of 22 players. The team is honorary and does not play any games.

== Selection panel ==
The selection panel for the 2022 All-Australian team consisted of chairman Gillon McLachlan, Kane Cornes, Glen Jakovich, Chris Johnson, Cameron Ling, Brad Scott, Gerard Healy, Nick Riewoldt, Jude Bolton, and Andrew Dillon.

== Team ==
=== Initial squad ===
The initial 44-man All-Australian squad was announced on 21 August, an increase on the 40-man squad of previous years. Melbourne had the most players selected in the initial squad with six, while the Geelong and Carlton had five. Essendon and North Melbourne were the only clubs not to have a single player nominated in the squad. 11 players from the 2021 team were among those selected.

Club	Total	Player(s)
Adelaide	2	Rory Laird, Taylor Walker
Brisbane Lions	3	Charlie Cameron, Hugh McCluggage, Lachie Neale
Carlton	5	Patrick Cripps, Charlie Curnow, Adam Saad, Sam Walsh, Jacob Weitering
Collingwood	3	Jack Crisp, Josh Daicos, Brayden Maynard
Essendon	0	
Fremantle	2	Andrew Brayshaw, Brennan Cox
Geelong	5	Mark Blicavs, Jeremy Cameron, Tom Hawkins, Tyson Stengle, Tom Stewart
Gold Coast	2	Touk Miller, Jarrod Witts
Greater Western Sydney	2	Josh Kelly, Sam Taylor
Hawthorn	1	James Sicily
Melbourne	6	Angus Brayshaw, Bayley Fritsch, Max Gawn, Steven May, Clayton Oliver, Christian Petracca
North Melbourne	0	
Port Adelaide	1	Connor Rozee
Richmond	3	Shai Bolton, Tom Lynch, Daniel Rioli
St Kilda	2	Jack Sinclair, Callum Wilkie
Sydney	4	Isaac Heeney, Callum Mills, Tom Papley, Chad Warner
West Coast	1	Tom Barrass
Western Bulldogs	2	Marcus Bontempelli, Jack Macrae

=== Final team ===
The final team was announced on Wednesday, 24 August.

2022 All-Australian team
B:	Tom Stewart (Geelong)	Steven May (Melbourne)	Brayden Maynard (Collingwood)
HB:	Jack Sinclair (St Kilda)	Sam Taylor (Greater Western Sydney)	Adam Saad (Carlton)
C:	Touk Miller (Gold Coast)	Clayton Oliver (Melbourne)	Callum Mills (Sydney)
HF:	Christian Petracca (Melbourne)	Jeremy Cameron (Geelong)	Shai Bolton (Richmond)
F:	Charlie Curnow (Carlton)	Tom Hawkins (Geelong) (captain)	Tyson Stengle (Geelong)
Foll:	Max Gawn (Melbourne)	Patrick Cripps (Carlton) (vice-captain)	Lachie Neale (Brisbane Lions)
Int:	Mark Blicavs (Geelong)	Andrew Brayshaw (Fremantle)	Isaac Heeney (Sydney)
Int:	Connor Rozee (Port Adelaide)		
Coach:	Chris Scott (Geelong)		

Note: the position of coach in the All-Australian team is traditionally awarded to the coach of the premiership team.
