= Caleb Daniel =

Australian rules footballer

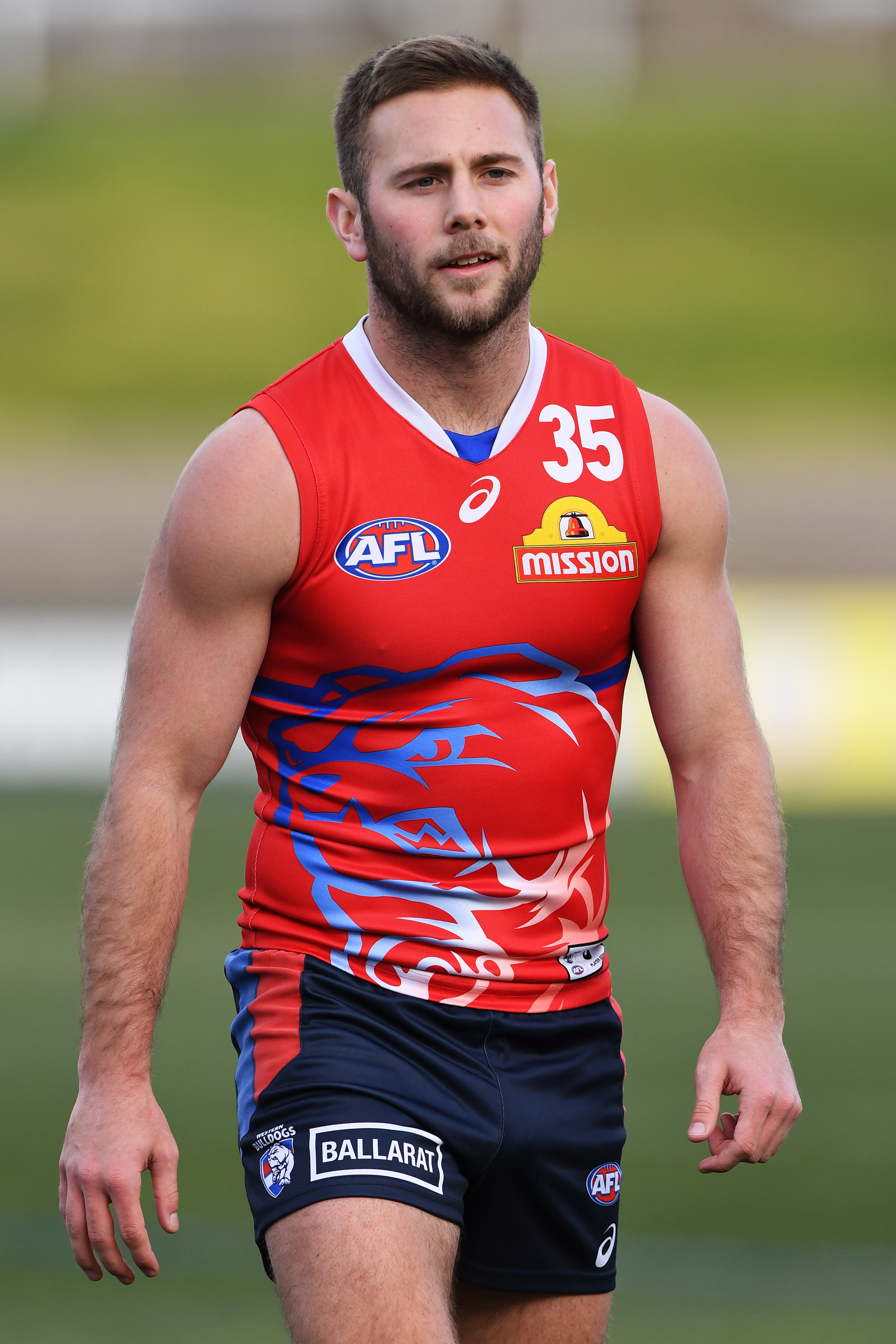
- Daniel in August 2018

Personal information
- Full name: Caleb Daniel
- Nickname: CD
- Born: 7 July 1996 (age 30); Beaudesert, Queensland, Australia
- Original team: South Adelaide(SANFL)/Edwardstown
- Draft: No. 46, 2014 national draft
- Height: 171 cm (5 ft 7 in)
- Weight: 72 kg (159 lb)
- Position: Defender

Club information
- Current club: North Melbourne
- Number: 5

Playing career^{1}
Years	Club	Games (Goals)
2015–2024	Western Bulldogs	192 (49)
2025–	North Melbourne	44 (0)
Total		234 (49)
- ^{1} Playing statistics correct to the end of round 22, 2026.

Career highlights
- AFL premiership player (2016); All-Australian (2020); Charles Sutton Medal (2020); AFL Rising Star nominee (2016)

Caleb Daniel (born 7 July 1996) is a professional Australian rules footballer who plays for the North Melbourne Football Club in the Australian Football League (AFL). Known for his precise short kicking from half back, Daniel has been recognised statistically as one of the most effective short kicks in the game. When he was recruited in 2014 he was listed as the shortest player at 167cm (standing now at 171 cm) in the AFL, and is one of the few players who regularly wears a protective helmet, having done so since his playing days at junior level. He previously played for the Western Bulldogs from 2015 to 2024 and was in the 2016 premiership team.

== Early days and career ==
Daniel was born in Beaudesert, Queensland where he lived until the age of five or six before moving to Adelaide. He studied at Aberfoyle Park High School and played eleven senior games for South Adelaide in the SANFL. He credits his coach at South Adelaide, former Fitzroy and St Kilda rover Brad Gotch, for instilling confidence in him at the start of his senior career.

== AFL career ==
=== Selection and debut ===
Daniel was selected by the Bulldogs with pick 46 of the 2014 National Draft. While he was overlooked by other clubs due to his short stature, Simon Dalrymple, the Bulldogs' chief recruiter at the time, had been impressed by Daniel, commenting: "His decision-making stood out, his ball-handling... He can keep on running. And he's got fantastic agility, and when you've got that lateral movement it buys you a bit more time." He made his debut in an 11-point win against Carlton as the starting substitute in round 14 of the 2015 season.

=== Early AFL career ===
After the promise shown in his debut season, Daniel took his game to the next level the following season, playing all but two games due to calf injury and playing a key role in the Bulldogs' drought-breaking premiership. In Round 4 2016, he was the round nominee for the 2016 AFL Rising Star after collecting 25 disposals in a 36-point win against Carlton. He would finish runner-up to Sydney's Callum Mills. Daniel was among the Bulldogs' best players in the Elimination Final win over West Coast at Subiaco Oval, amassing a then career-high 33 disposals and kicking a goal.

In February 2017, Daniel signed a two-year contract extension with the Western Bulldogs, keeping him at the club until 2019. Daniel had required a shoulder reconstruction after the Western Bulldogs 2016 Premiership, meaning he trained without contact for some time. Daniel played 20 games in the 2017 AFL season, only missing out on rounds 4 and 5, which he spent in the Victorian Football League (VFL). In the 2017 season, Daniel had 12 games where he picked up 20 or more disposals. After being recognised for having a strong season, Daniel came fifth in the Charles Sutton Medal voting for 2017.

=== 2020 season: Best and fairest success ===
Daniel played every game in the home and away season, having a career best season and being recognised around the league for his impressive performance. Daniel was ranked as the games best ranked general defender according to AFL Player ratings. He was nominated by the Western Bulldogs for the Leigh Matthews Trophy, alongside teammates Marcus Bontempelli and Jack Macrae. He was named in the initial 40-man squad of the 2020 All-Australian team. Daniel made the 22 man final squad, named on the interchange bench.

Daniel won the Western Bulldogs best and fairest award, the Charles Sutton Medal, with a total of 205 votes over the course of the 18 games he played, beating Western Bulldogs captain Marcus Bontempelli by a mere 10 votes.

=== Later AFL career ===
Daniel signed a four-year contract extension with the Bulldogs in 2022.

In the same year, Daniel came sixth in the club’s Best and Fairest count despite missing a month of the season due to knee surgery.

Following the 2024 AFL season, Daniel was traded to North Melbourne.

== Statistics ==
Updated to the end of round 22, 2026.

Legend
G	Goals	K	Kicks	D	Disposals	T	Tackles
B	Behinds	H	Handballs	M	Marks

Season	Team	No.	Games	Totals							Averages (per game)							Votes
Season	Team	No.	Games	G	B	K	H	D	M	T	G	B	K	H	D	M	T	Votes
2015	Western Bulldogs	35	10	6	2	55	76	131	23	22	0.6	0.2	5.5	7.6	13.1	2.3	2.2	0
2016^{#}	Western Bulldogs	35	24	11	9	279	239	518	89	79	0.5	0.4	11.6	10.0	21.6	3.7	3.3	0
2017	Western Bulldogs	35	20	5	5	210	224	434	59	57	0.3	0.3	10.5	11.2	21.7	3.0	2.9	1
2018	Western Bulldogs	35	20	4	7	214	206	420	84	63	0.2	0.4	10.7	10.3	21.0	4.2	3.2	1
2019	Western Bulldogs	35	17	1	0	294	157	451	67	53	0.1	0.0	17.3	9.2	26.5	3.9	3.1	3
2020 (Note: The 2020 season was played with 17 home-and-away matches per team (down from 22) and 16-minute quarters with time on (down from 20-minute quarters with time on) due to the impact of the COVID-19 pandemic.)	Western Bulldogs	35	18	3	2	225	138	363	59	42	0.2	0.1	12.5	7.7	20.2	3.3	2.3	3
2021	Western Bulldogs	35	25	7	1	364	267	631	100	58	0.3	0.0	14.6	10.7	25.2	4.0	2.3	4
2022	Western Bulldogs	35	19	0	0	297	172	469	97	36	0.0	0.0	15.6	9.1	24.7	5.1	1.9	0
2023	Western Bulldogs	35	23	10	6	295	242	537	100	88	0.4	0.3	12.8	10.5	23.3	4.3	3.8	2
2024	Western Bulldogs	35	16	2	4	125	99	224	45	31	0.1	0.3	7.8	6.2	14.0	2.8	1.9	0
2025	North Melbourne	5	23	0	0	376	213	589	88	44	0.0	0.0	16.3	9.3	25.6	3.8	1.9	0
2026	North Melbourne	5	21	0	1	327	205	532	114	45	0.0	0.0	15.6	9.8	25.3	5.4	2.1	0
Career			236	49	37	3061	2238	5299	925	618	0.2	0.2	13.0	9.5	22.5	3.9	2.6	14

== Honours and achievements ==
- Team
  - AFL premiership: 2016
- Individual
  - AFL Rising Star nominee: 2016
  - All-Australian team: 2020
  - Charles Sutton Medal: 2020
