= Clayton Oliver =

Australian rules footballer (born 1997)

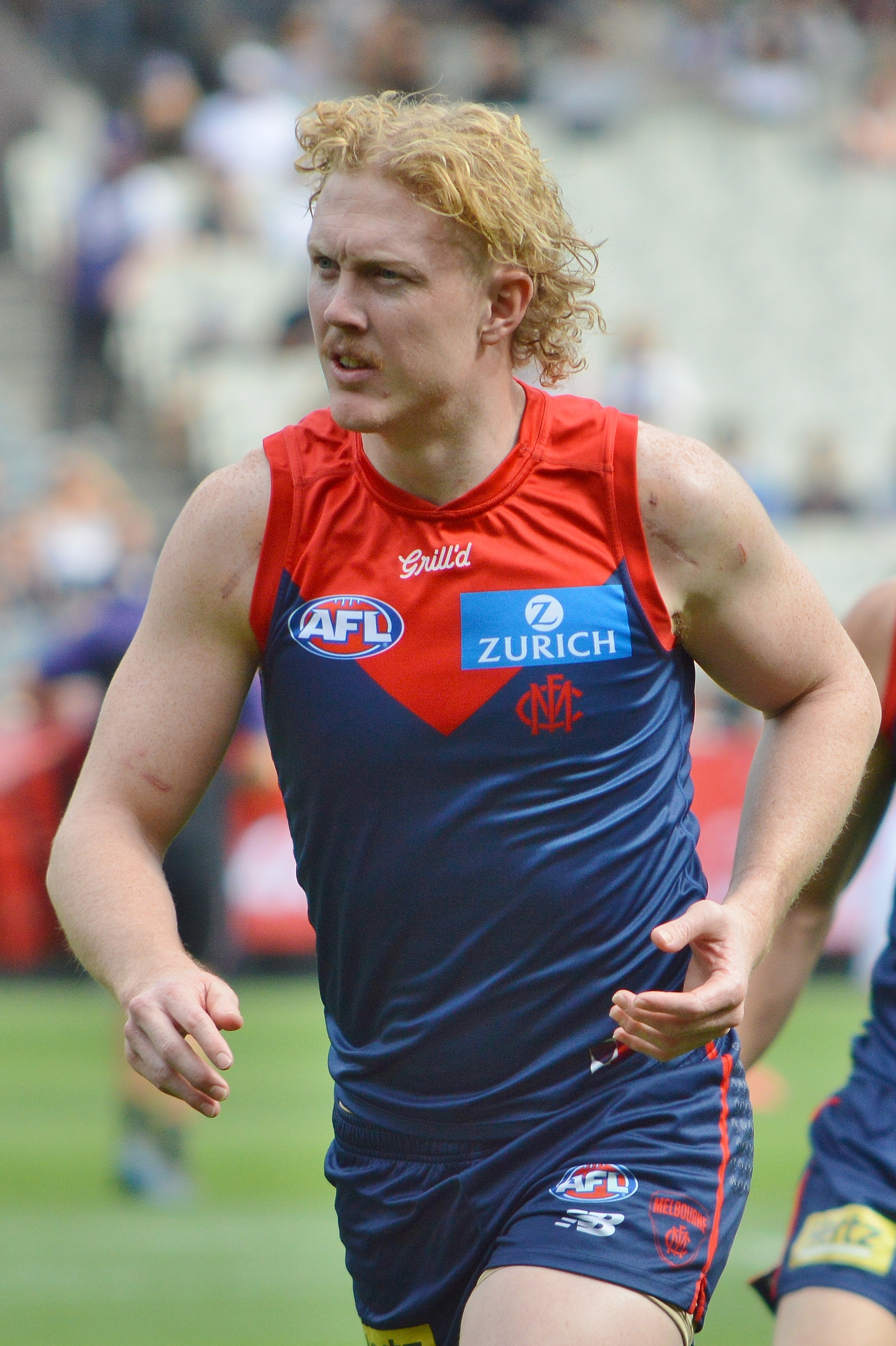
- Oliver playing for Melbourne in 2025

Personal information
- Full name: Clayton Michael Oliver
- Nickname: Clarry
- Born: 22 July 1997 (age 29)
- Original team: Murray Bushrangers (TAC Cup)
- Draft: No. 4, 2015 national draft
- Debut: Round 1, 2016, Melbourne vs. Greater Western Sydney, at Melbourne Cricket Ground
- Height: 189 cm (6 ft 2 in)
- Weight: 87 kg (192 lb)
- Position: Midfielder

Club information
- Current club: Greater Western Sydney
- Number: 10

Playing career^{1}
Years	Club	Games (Goals)
2016–2025	Melbourne	205 (58)
2026–	Greater Western Sydney	21 (4)
Total		224 (62)
- ^{1} Playing statistics correct to the end of round 22, 2026.

Career highlights
- AFL premiership player: 2021; 2× AFLCA champion player of the year: 2021, 2022; 3× All-Australian team: 2018, 2021, 2022; 4× Keith 'Bluey' Truscott Trophy: 2017, 2019, 2021, 2022; AFLCA best young player: 2017; Frank 'Checker' Hughes Medal: 2022; Neale Daniher Trophy: 2022; AFL Rising Star nominee: 2016

Clayton Oliver (born 22 July 1997) is a professional Australian rules footballer playing for Greater Western Sydney in the Australian Football League (AFL). He previously played for the Melbourne Football Club from 2016 to 2025. A midfielder, 1.89 metres (6 ft 2 in) tall and weighing 87 kilograms (192 lb), Oliver is known for his capabilities on the inside due to his handball and clearance work. He was a late bloomer in his junior career, where he struggled to play in the TAC Cup in 2014 and he missed selection in the 2015 AFL Under 18 Championships. After playing with the Murray Bushrangers in 2015, his achievements included best and fairest wins for the league and the Murray Bushrangers, which resulted in Melbourne drafting him with the fourth selection in the 2015 AFL draft. He made his debut in the 2016 season, which garnered a Rising Star nomination. After his second season in the AFL, he was adjudged the best young player by the AFL coaches.

== Early life ==
As a child, Oliver started supporting the Brisbane Lions during their premiership years in the early 2000s.

Oliver grew up in the Victorian town of Echuca and began playing junior football for Echuca Football Club. He later moved to Mooroopna Football Club to play for a team closer to his high school in Shepparton, which made it easier to attend training.

He played for the Mooroopna Football Club senior side in the Goulburn Valley Football League in 2014 and he was awarded the Rising Star in the league, in the same season, he struggled to play in the Bendigo Pioneers side in the TAC Cup, playing only three matches. He moved from Echuca into an apartment in Mooroopna for 2015 to be closer to his school, Goulburn Valley Grammar School in Shepparton for year 12, he was then encouraged to join the Murray Bushrangers for the 2015 TAC Cup season. He missed out on selection for the 2015 AFL Under 18 Championships for Victoria Country after suffering from osteitis pubis, and after a slow start to the TAC Cup season, it was predicted he would be unlikely to be drafted in the 2015 AFL draft. His initial plans were to study radiography at university from 2016 and then earn his AFL draft chance through the Victorian Football League (VFL).

In July, Oliver was selected to play for the Richmond Football Club's VFL side, and after playing two matches for them, his TAC Cup form drastically improved. He was adjudged the best and fairest player in the TAC Cup by winning the Morrish Medal, where he received fourteen votes in the final nine rounds, and finished with fifteen in total, one vote ahead of Eastern Ranges forward, Darcy Crocker and Northern Knights midfielder, Jade Gresham, in addition, he was named on the interchange in the TAC Cup team of the year. He also won the John Byrne Medal as the Murray Bushrangers best and fairest player, finishing eight votes ahead of Murray Waite. After winning the Morrish Medal and John Byrne Medal, he was predicted to be drafted inside the top twenty-five of the draft. He was invited to the national draft combine, where he performed well in the agility test, 20-metre time trial, and three kilometre time trial, which elevated his draft chances to inside the top ten. In the weeks leading to the draft, he was labelled as the "draft bolter" and after the Melbourne Football Club showed strong interest in him, he was predicted to be drafted inside the top five in the days leading to the draft.

== AFL career ==
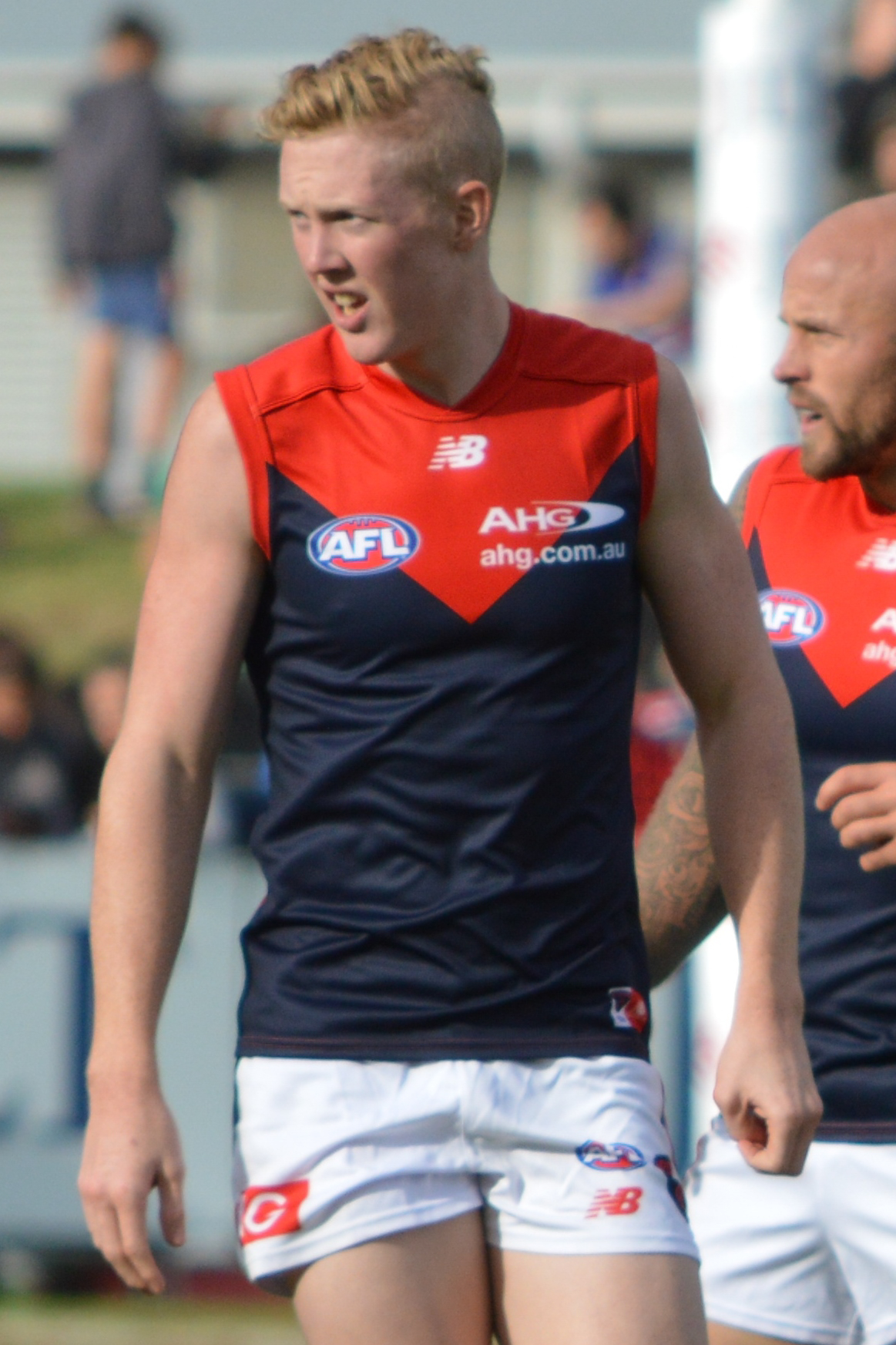
Oliver playing for Melbourne in the 2017 JLT Community Series

After the Melbourne Football Club unsuccessfully bid pick three in the 2015 national draft on Callum Mills, Oliver was recruited by them with their first selection and fourth overall. He was predicted by Fox Footy as one of the draftees who would have an immediate impact in the 2016 season, and after playing well in the 2016 NAB Challenge, he made his debut in the two-point win against Greater Western Sydney at the Melbourne Cricket Ground in Round 1. He was highly praised during his debut match where he recorded twenty-two disposals, with fifteen of them contested, and seven clearances from 58 percent game-time, and it was labelled as one of the best debuts in the previous fifteen years by Fox Sports Australia journalist Tiarne Swersky.

At the end of the first half, Oliver had seventeen disposals and led the contested possession and clearance count with eleven and five, respectively; his first half was described by 1988 Brownlow Medallist, Gerard Healy, as "one of the best debut halves [he'd] seen" and former Essendon player Scott Lucas labelled him as the "real deal". Furthermore, his debut match was rewarded with the round nomination for the Rising Star and he became the equal favourite at the time for the Rising Star alongside Sydney defender and eventual winner, Callum Mills. He also received two Brownlow votes, indicating he was judged as the second-best player on the ground by the field umpires. He played the next three matches, which saw him praised within the industry along with comparisons to a former St Kilda player, Lenny Hayes, before being rested for the ANZAC Day eve match against Richmond at the Melbourne Cricket Ground in Round 5. He played in the Victorian Football League (VFL) for Melbourne's affiliate team, the Casey Scorpions, the next week before returning to the senior side for the 73-point win against Gold Coast at Metricon Stadium in Round 7.

Oliver played the next five out of six matches, missing the 45-point loss against Port Adelaide at TIO Traeger Park in Round 10 due to a corked quad, before being dropped for the Round 15 match against Adelaide at the Melbourne Cricket Ground. He returned to the AFL side for the 29-point win against Hawthorn at the Melbourne Cricket Ground in Round 20 in which he was praised for his toughness and ability to bounce back from a Cyril Rioli bump in the first quarter, whereby Rioli received a fine from the match review panel. He played the next two matches before missing the last match of the season against Geelong at Simonds Stadium. He then returned to Casey for the VFL finals, including playing in the grand final loss against Footscray at Etihad Stadium. He finished the AFL season with thirteen matches, which resulted in an eighth-place finish in the Rising Star, and consequently only finished 20th in Melbourne's best and fairest count.

During the off-season break after the 2016 season, Oliver failed a roadside random breath test whereby probationary (P-plate) drivers require zero blood alcohol content; he escaped club suspension, but he was fined an undisclosed amount. He lost five kilograms during pre-season training in which he credited his drink driving charge as a key driver behind wanting to improve his training standards. His drive during the pre-season drew public praise from his teammates including Aaron vandenBerg and Tom McDonald, and Melbourne's development and strategy coach, Brendan McCartney, who all stated they believed Oliver was the player to watch for the 2017 season, as he could take his "game to new heights." Furthermore, former Melbourne captain Garry Lyon nominated Oliver as the player who could surpass all of his teammates in the future to become the club's best player by stating on SEN Breakfast: "they've got a great group of youngsters coming through ... and there's a boy called Clayton Oliver who I think is going to be better than all of them ... this guy is so good and clean in tight that I don't think most people—and I'm not putting him down—but unless you take a particular interest in the kid, you can't see how good he is."

Oliver played in the opening round of the season in the 38-point win against St Kilda at Etihad Stadium in which he recorded 36 disposals, fourteen contested possessions, eleven tackles and nine clearances, and was named "clearly the best player on the ground" by Fox Sports Australia journalist Anna Harrington and AFL Media reporter Ben Guthrie. His performance in the match saw him compared with 1996 Brownlow Medallist and three-time premiership captain Michael Voss. In addition, his athletic style led to Melbourne's strength and conditioning coach, Rob Jackson, comparing Oliver with the Australian, Queensland and Melbourne Storm rugby league captain Cameron Smith—whom Jackson had also worked with—by noting neither were the fastest or the strongest, but were unbelievable.

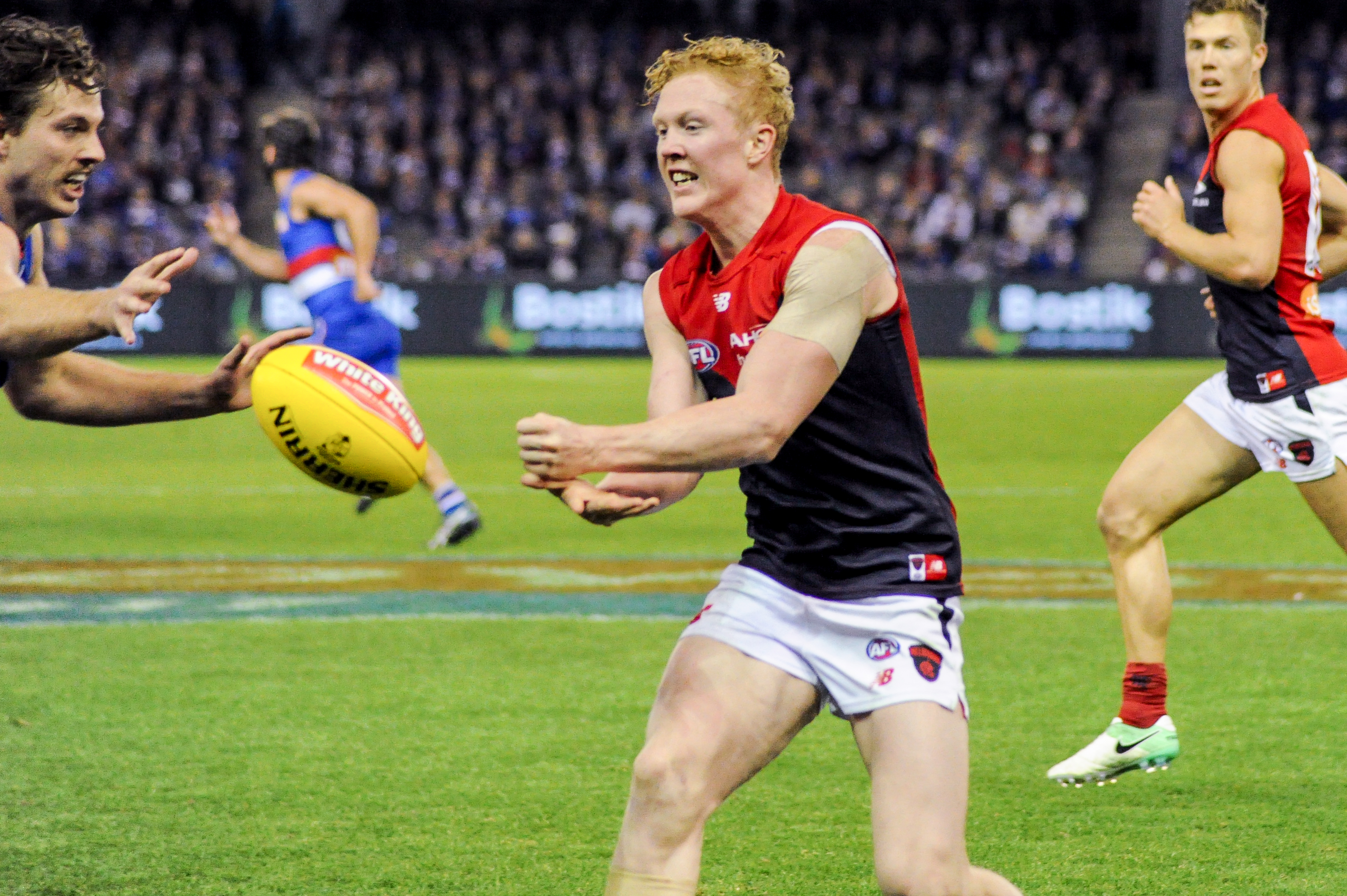
Oliver handballing during the round 13, 2017 match against the Western Bulldogs

Oliver continued his strong performances throughout the start of the season, and, by a third of the way through, he was being talked about as a potential Brownlow Medal winner. Jay Clark of the Herald Sun wrote it could be one of the "biggest Brownlow Medal boilovers of all time" and he could become the fourth-youngest Brownlow Medallist of all time (20 years and 65 days) if his extraordinary form continued. After Round 8, he was leading player of the year votes for The Age and 3AW and was sitting third in the AFL Coaches Association player of the year award. He was named in unofficial mid-year All-Australian teams by Mark Robinson and AFL Media and was named the tenth-best midfielder in the league by Wayne Carey. Furthermore, Melbourne's captain at the time, Nathan Jones, said Oliver was the best young talent he had seen in his eleven to twelve years of playing AFL football.

The second half of the season saw Oliver face public furore after he was involved in separate on-field incidents. At the half-time break of the Round 14 match against West Coast, he was hit by West Coast's Will Schofield in which Schofield was immediately reported and consequently charged by the match review panel for striking. Oliver was publicly criticised by fans for "staging" and "diving". Former Australian Test cricketer Damien Martyn tweeted: "am I watching soccer???" in relation to the incident, to which Oliver responded on Twitter: "hey Damien, you should just worry about that shot in 1994. #amiwatchingachoker" in reference to a batting shot against South Africa in the 1994 Sydney Test match which eventually saw Australia narrowly losing to South Africa; Oliver had not even been born when the incident occurred. Former Richmond player Matthew Richardson publicly defended Oliver amid claims he was a stager by saying: "Unless you're the one who's received that contact, how do you really know [how hard the hit was] ... he seems like a straight-up, honest kid". Schofield successfully appealed the original charge after arguing that while "he intended to strike Oliver and hit him with his forearm to the chin, the contact was so negligible it was not sufficient for a report". Two weeks later during the Round 16 match against Carlton, Oliver confronted a Carlton supporter who was sitting in the front row of the Melbourne Cricket Ground after the supporter had yelled something at him over the fence. He was publicly condemned by former players, including Leigh Matthews and Nick Dal Santo, who stated players needed to ignore the crowd during matches and not confront them.

Oliver played every match for the 2017 season. At the conclusion of the home-and-away season, he recorded the most handballs by any player in the league, and the all-time record for most handballs in a season. He was also ranked second for contested possessions, third for clearances, fourth for tackles and fifth for total disposals. He was voted the best young player by the AFL Coaches Association when he polled 72 votes in the AFL Coaches Association best young player award, 34 votes clear of Sam Menegola, who finished second; this was in addition to finishing seventh in the AFL Coaches Association champion player of the year award. He was one of three Melbourne players nominated for the Leigh Matthews Trophy as the AFL Players Association most valuable player and was named in the centre midfield position in the 22under22 team. He was rewarded with the Keith 'Bluey' Truscott Trophy as Melbourne's best and fairest player when he polled 530 votes—184 ahead of Jack Viney, who placed second in the award—and received votes in every match for the season. He also won the Harold Ball Memorial Trophy as Melbourne's best young player and the James McDonald Trophy for the heart and spirit award. Despite his accolades for the season, he failed to make the initial forty man squad for the All-Australian team with multiple media outlets including AFL Media, The Advertiser and Fox Sports Australia claiming he was one of, if not the most unlucky player to miss the All-Australian squad.

The 2018 AFL Season saw Oliver take his game to another level—he played 25 games and impacted the scoreboard by kicking 12 goals for the season. The Demons won 16 games and made it to the preliminary final but were defeated by the eventual premiers, the West Coast Eagles. Oliver had a total of 734 disposals, 168 tackles and 405 contested possessions; his excellent season saw him selected for his first All Australian Team, where he was selected on the interchange. He eventually finished second in the Keith 'Bluey' Truscott Medal behind fellow All-Australian teammate Max Gawn. The 2019 AFL Season saw Oliver's impact slightly decline, as well as the Demons only managing to win 5 games for the season. Oliver managed to only kick 4 goals for the season and was seen to over-handball the football rather than kick the ball to his teammates advantage; he was still extremely consistent numbers-wise, averaging a career-high 30 disposals per game and polling 12 Brownlow Votes despite being in a losing side most weeks. He was rewarded with his consistent season by winning his second Keith 'Bluey' Truscott Medal, tying with his teammate Max Gawn on 464 total votes.

== Statistics ==
Updated to the end of round 22, 2026.

Legend
G	Goals	K	Kicks	D	Disposals	T	Tackles
B	Behinds	H	Handballs	M	Marks
#	Played in that season's premiership team	†	Led the league for the season

Season	Team	No.	Games	Totals							Averages (per game)							Votes
Season	Team	No.	Games	G	B	K	H	D	M	T	G	B	K	H	D	M	T	Votes
2016	Melbourne	13	13	6	2	76	174	250	25	62	0.5	0.2	5.8	13.4	19.2	1.9	4.8	3
2017	Melbourne	13	22	4	3	177	482^{†}	659	68	152	0.2	0.1	8.0	21.9	30.0	3.1	6.9	12
2018	Melbourne	13	25	12	11	262	472^{†}	734	87	168	0.5	0.4	10.5	18.9	29.4	3.5	6.7	13
2019	Melbourne	13	22	4	4	248	413	661	82	139	0.2	0.2	11.3	18.8	30.0	3.7	6.3	12
2020 (Note: The 2020 season was played with 17 home-and-away matches per team (down from 22) and 16-minute quarters with time on (down from 20-minute quarters with time on) due to the impact of the COVID-19 pandemic.)	Melbourne	13	17	3	1	195	231	426	57	91	0.2	0.1	11.5	13.6	25.1	3.4	5.4	14
2021^{#}	Melbourne	13	25	11	18	358	431	789	89	136	0.4	0.7	14.3	17.2	31.6	3.6	5.4	31
2022	Melbourne	13	23	5	8	344	409^{†}	753	82	126	0.2	0.3	15.0	17.8	32.7	3.6	5.5	25
2023	Melbourne	13	15	6	2	224	230	454	63	101	0.4	0.1	14.9	15.3	30.3	4.2	6.7	6
2024	Melbourne	13	21	3	4	229	258	487	59	84	0.1	0.2	10.9	12.3	23.2	2.8	4.0	5
2025	Melbourne	13	22	4	6	238	324	562	63	119	0.2	0.3	10.8	14.7	25.5	2.9	5.4	0
2026	Greater Western Sydney	10	21	4	5	238	403	641	62	105	0.2	0.2	11.3	19.2	30.5	3.0	5.0	0
Career			226	62	64	2589	3827	6416	737	1283	0.3	0.3	11.5	16.9	28.4	3.3	5.7	121

== Honours and achievements ==
Team

- AFL premiership player (Melbourne): 2021
- AFL minor premiership: 2021
- McClelland Trophy (Melbourne): 2021, 2023

Individual

- 2× AFLCA Champion Player of the Year Award: 2021, 2022
- 3× All-Australian team: 2018, 2021, 2022
- 4× Keith 'Bluey' Truscott Trophy: 2017, 2019, 2021, 2022
- Australian Football Media Association Player of the Year: 2007
- Lou Richards Medal: 2021
- AFLCA Best Young Player of the Year Award: 2017
- Morrish Medal: 2015
- 3× 22under22 team: 2017, 2018, 2019
- Sid Anderson Memorial Trophy (Melbourne B&F Runner-Up): 2018
- Harold Ball Memorial Trophy: 2017
- Neale Daniher Trophy: 2022
- AFL Rising Star nominee: 2016 (round 1)
