= Orazio Fantasia =

Australian rules footballer

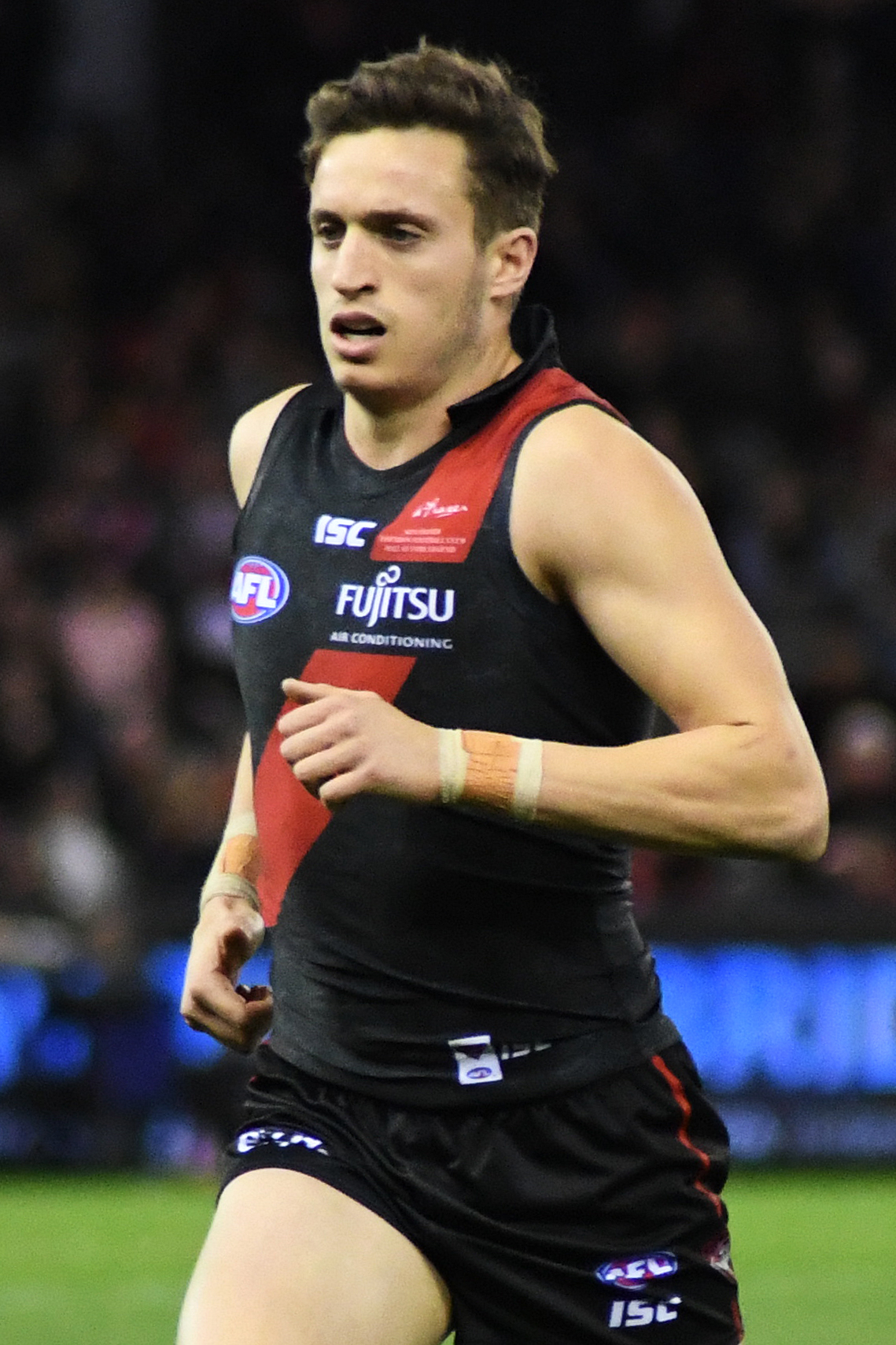
- Fantasia playing for Essendon in August 2018

Personal information
- Full name: Orazio Maurice Fantasia
- Nicknames: "Raz", "Razzle Dazzle"
- Born: 14 September 1995 (age 31); Adelaide, South Australia
- Original team: Norwood (SANFL)
- Draft: No. 55, 2013 national draft
- Height: 180 cm (5 ft 11 in)
- Weight: 77 kg (170 lb)
- Position: Forward

Playing career
Years	Club	Games (Goals)
2014–2020	Essendon	80 (111)
2021–2023	Port Adelaide	19 (30)
2024–2025	Carlton	21 (16)
Total		120 (157)

Career highlights
- 22under22 team: 2017; 2× AFL Rising Star nominee: 2015, 2016

Orazio Maurice Fantasia (/əˈrɑːziːoʊ fæntəˈsiːə/ ə-RAH-zee-oh fan-tə-SEE-ə or /fænˈteɪʒə/ fan-TAY-zhə; (Note: Fantasia has used both pronunciations of his surname. He has noted that the "fan-tə-SEE-ə" pronunciation is closer to the original Italian pronunciation. In 2019, however, a spokesperson for Esssendon, for whom Fantasia then played, stated that "Orazio is [also] comfortable if people continue to run with [the "fan-TAY-zhə"] pronunciation." Following Fantasia's expression of his preferences on the matter, commentator Brian Taylor was criticised for continuing to use the "fan-TAY-zhə" pronunciation, claiming it to be an "Australianism". Despite his own expressed preferences, Fantasia typically uses the "fan-TAY-zhə" pronunciation when referring to himself.) born 14 September 1995) is a former professional Australian rules footballer who played for Essendon, Port Adelaide and Carlton in the Australian Football League (AFL).

== AFL career ==
Fantasia graduated from Norwood Morialta High School in 2013. Fantasia played his junior football for the Payneham Norwood Union Football Club where his talent was identified by South Australian Hall of Famer Garry McIntosh who selected him in the club's senior side as a 15 year old. He made his senior debut for Norwood in the South Australian National Football League (SANFL) in 2013. In only his fourth game he was a member of their 2013 SANFL premiership side.

=== Essendon ===
Fantasia was drafted into the AFL by the Essendon Football Club with the 55th overall selection in the 2013 national draft.

He made his debut against Richmond in round 20, 2014 and was dropped for the following round but regained his spot in round 22 against the Gold Coast, replacing Dyson Heppell who missed the game due to a broken hand. In the final round of the 2015 season, he was rewarded with a nomination for the AFL Rising Star where he recorded 27 disposals and five marks in the Bombers' three-point victory over Collingwood.

Fantasia received a second nomination for the Rising Star after his three goals, eleven disposals, seven contested possessions, and seven tackles in round 17, 2016.

In August 2018, Fantasia signed a three-year deal, keeping him at Essendon until the end of the 2021 season.

At the end of the 2020 AFL season, Fantasia requested a trade back home to South Australia, and was traded to Port Adelaide on the final day of the trade period.

=== Port Adelaide ===
Fantasia struggled with injuries and form during his time at Port Adelaide, and was delisted after the expiration of his three-year contract having managed only 19 matches for the club in his three years.

=== Carlton ===
Fantasia was thrown a lifeline by Carlton, signing a two-year contract as a Delisted Free Agent ahead of the 2024 AFL season.

Fantasia played 21 matches for Carlton over his two seasons, before being delisted at the end of the 2025 season.

== Statistics ==
Legend
G	Goals	K	Kicks	D	Disposals	T	Tackles
B	Behinds	H	Handballs	M	Marks

Season	Team	No.	Games	Totals							Averages (per game)							Votes
Season	Team	No.	Games	G	B	K	H	D	M	T	G	B	K	H	D	M	T	Votes
2014	Essendon	46	3	0	2	9	17	26	8	1	0.0	0.7	3.0	5.7	8.7	2.7	0.3	0
2015	Essendon	46	5	2	0	41	40	81	16	18	0.4	0.0	8.2	8.0	16.2	3.2	3.6	0
2016	Essendon	13	19	29	25	146	136	282	75	72	1.5	1.3	7.7	7.2	14.8	3.9	3.8	1
2017	Essendon	13	20	39	22	161	114	275	74	53	2.0	1.1	8.1	5.7	13.8	3.7	2.7	7
2018	Essendon	13	13	20	16	109	92	201	54	64	1.5	1.2	8.4	7.1	15.5	4.2	4.9	3
2019	Essendon	13	15	20	12	101	72	173	46	32	1.3	0.8	6.7	4.8	11.5	3.1	2.1	1
2020 (Note: The 2020 season was played with 17 home-and-away matches per team (down from 22) and 16-minute quarters with time on (down from 20-minute quarters with time on) due to the impact of the COVID-19 pandemic.)	Essendon	13	5	1	0	27	22	49	15	6	0.2	0.0	5.4	4.4	9.8	3.0	1.2	0
2021	Port Adelaide	13	15	28	23	126	52	178	48	30	1.9	1.5	8.4	3.5	11.9	3.2	2.0	0
2022	Port Adelaide	13	1	0	0	0	0	0	0	0	0.0	0.0	0.0	0.0	0.0	0.0	0.0	0
2023	Port Adelaide	13	3	2	5	13	10	23	5	5	0.7	1.7	4.3	3.3	7.7	1.7	1.7	0
2024	Carlton	14	15	9	7	68	59	127	29	22	0.6	0.5	4.5	3.9	8.5	1.9	1.5	0
2025	Carlton	14	6	7	4	41	27	68	18	13	1.2	0.7	6.8	4.5	11.3	3.0	2.2	0
Career			120	157	116	842	641	1483	388	316	1.3	1.0	7.0	5.3	12.4	3.2	2.6	12
