= Ryan Clarke (Australian footballer) =

Australian rules footballer

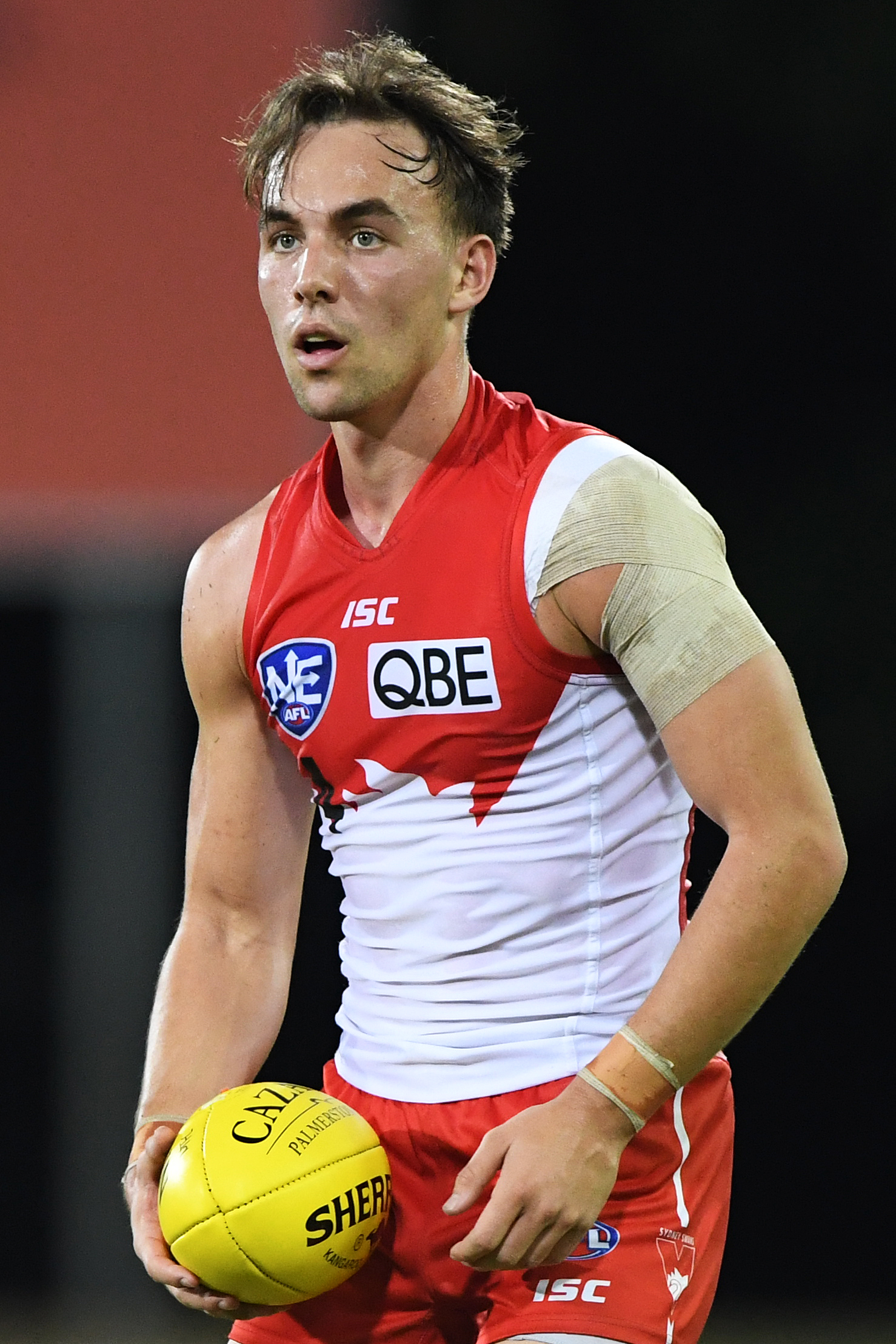
- Clarke playing for Sydney in July 2019

Personal information
- Full name: Ryan Clarke
- Born: 17 June 1997 (age 29)
- Original team: Eastern Ranges (TAC Cup)/Melbourne Grammar (APS)/Rowville Football Club
- Draft: No. 31, 2015 national draft
- Debut: Round 16, 2016, North Melbourne vs. West Coast, at Domain Stadium
- Height: 186 cm (6 ft 1 in)
- Weight: 85 kg (187 lb)
- Position: Midfielder

Playing career^{1}
Years	Club	Games (Goals)
2016–2018	North Melbourne	40 (8)
2019–2023	Sydney	57 (13)
Total		97 (21)
- ^{1} Playing statistics correct to the end of round 24, 2023.

Career highlights
- AFL Rising Star nominee: 2016

Ryan Clarke (born 17 June 1997) is a former professional Australian rules footballer who played for the North Melbourne Football Club and Sydney Swans in the Australian Football League (AFL).

== Early career ==
Prior to being drafted he attended Melbourne Grammar School and was captain of their First XVIII football team. At TAC Cup level he played for the Eastern Ranges, Clarke was viewed as a prolific ball-winner who averaged 31 disposals a game. He was and also impressive while playing for Vic Metro in the NAB AFL Under 18 Championships.

== AFL career ==
He was drafted by the North Melbourne Football Club with their second selection and thirty-first overall in the 2015 national draft. He made his debut in the thirty-two point loss against West Coast in round 16, 2016 at Domain Stadium. He was rewarded with the round nomination for the Rising Star in the round 18, forty-point win against the Collingwood Football Club at Etihad Stadium where he recorded twenty-seven disposals, twelve contested possessions, four inside-50s and three goal assists. At the conclusion of the 2018 season, Clarke was traded to the Sydney Swans; where he played until he was delisted at the end of the 2023 season.

== Family ==
Clarke is the older brother of Essendon's Dylan Clarke.

== Statistics ==
Updated to the end of the 2022 season.

Legend
G	Goals	K	Kicks	D	Disposals	T	Tackles
B	Behinds	H	Handballs	M	Marks

Season	Team	No.	Games	Totals							Averages (per game)							Votes
Season	Team	No.	Games	G	B	K	H	D	M	T	G	B	K	H	D	M	T	Votes
2016	North Melbourne	13	6	0	4	35	70	105	12	13	0.0	0.7	5.8	11.7	17.5	2.0	2.2	0
2017	North Melbourne	13	15	6	4	127	170	297	56	31	0.4	0.3	8.5	11.3	19.8	3.7	2.1	0
2018	North Melbourne	13	19	2	3	207	168	375	82	32	0.1	0.2	10.9	8.8	19.7	4.3	1.7	0
2019	Sydney	4	14	1	1	122	118	240	41	44	0.1	0.1	8.7	8.4	17.1	2.9	3.1	0
2020 (Note: The 2020 season was played with 17 home-and-away matches per team (down from 22) and 16-minute quarters with time on (down from 20-minute quarters with time on) due to the impact of the COVID-19 pandemic.)	Sydney	4	10	2	1	86	79	165	25	25	0.2	0.1	8.6	7.9	16.5	2.5	2.5	1
2021	Sydney	4	3	0	0	6	1	7	3	1	0.0	0.0	2.0	0.3	2.3	1.0	0.3	0
2022	Sydney	4	14	5	4	54	75	129	21	40	0.4	0.3	3.9	5.4	9.2	1.5	2.9	0
Career			81	16	17	637	681	1318	240	186	0.2	0.2	7.9	8.4	16.3	3.0	2.3	1

== Honours and achievements ==
Individual

- AFL Rising Star nominee: 2016 (round 18)
