= 2016 AFL Rising Star =

Australian rules football award

2016 NAB AFL Rising Star
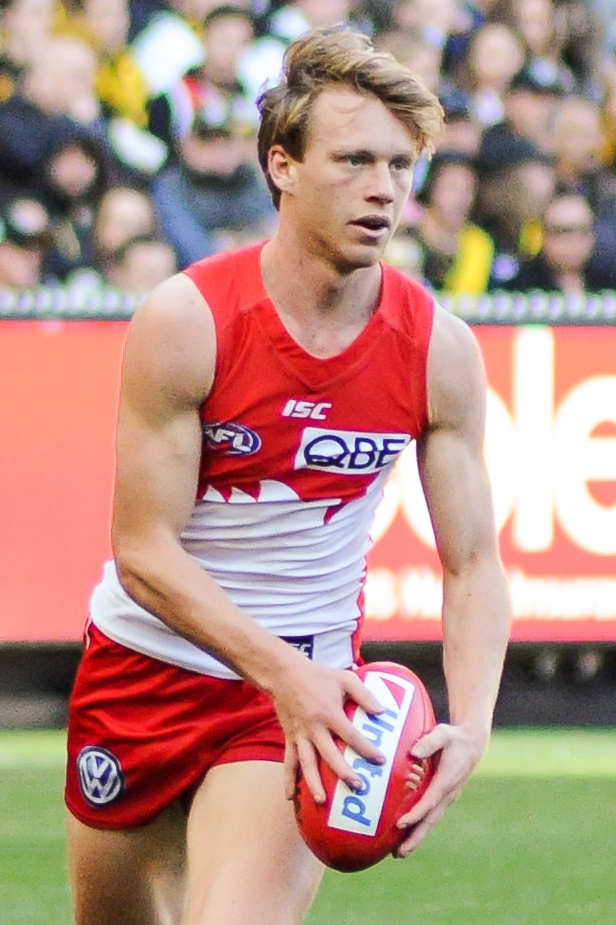
- Callum Mills, 2016 winner
- Sponsored by: National Australia Bank
- Date: 6 September 2016
- Location: Crown Palladium
- Ron Evans medallist: Callum Mills (Sydney)

Television/radio coverage
- Network: Fox Footy

The AFL Rising Star is an Australian rules football award presented annually to the player adjudged the best young player in the Australian Football League (AFL) for the year. An eligible player is nominated for the award each round during the AFL's regular season, and a panel of experts vote for the winner at the end of the season.

During the 2016 season, the award was sponsored by National Australia Bank. The winner was announced in a presentation held at Crown Palladium on 6 September 2016 and broadcast on subscription television by Fox Footy. The voting panel for the season consisted of ten members, all of whom were AFL officials or former players: Kevin Bartlett, Luke Darcy, Mark Evans, Danny Frawley, Glen Jakovich, Cameron Ling, Gillon McLachlan, Matthew Richardson, Warren Tredrea and Kevin Sheehan.

The winner was Sydney player Callum Mills, who polled 49 votes. Mills was the third Sydney recipient to win the award, and the first New South Wales–born winner. The club that garnered the most individual nominations this season was Melbourne with four players nominated for the award, a record for the club. Essendon player Orazio Fantasia, who received a nomination in round 17, was previously nominated for the award in the 2015 season—becoming the tenth player ever to be nominated twice for a Rising Star award.

== Nominations ==
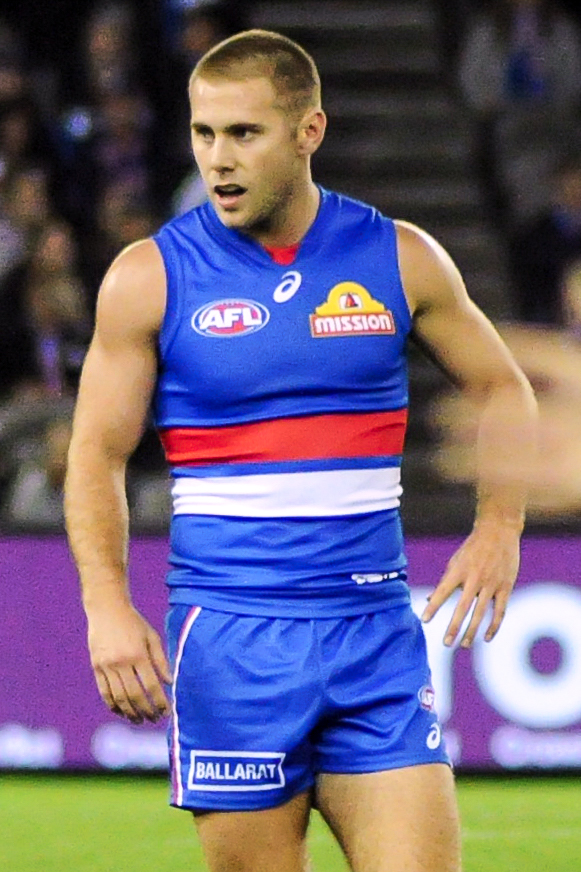
Caleb Daniel finished second in the final voting for the season's award, with 41 votes.

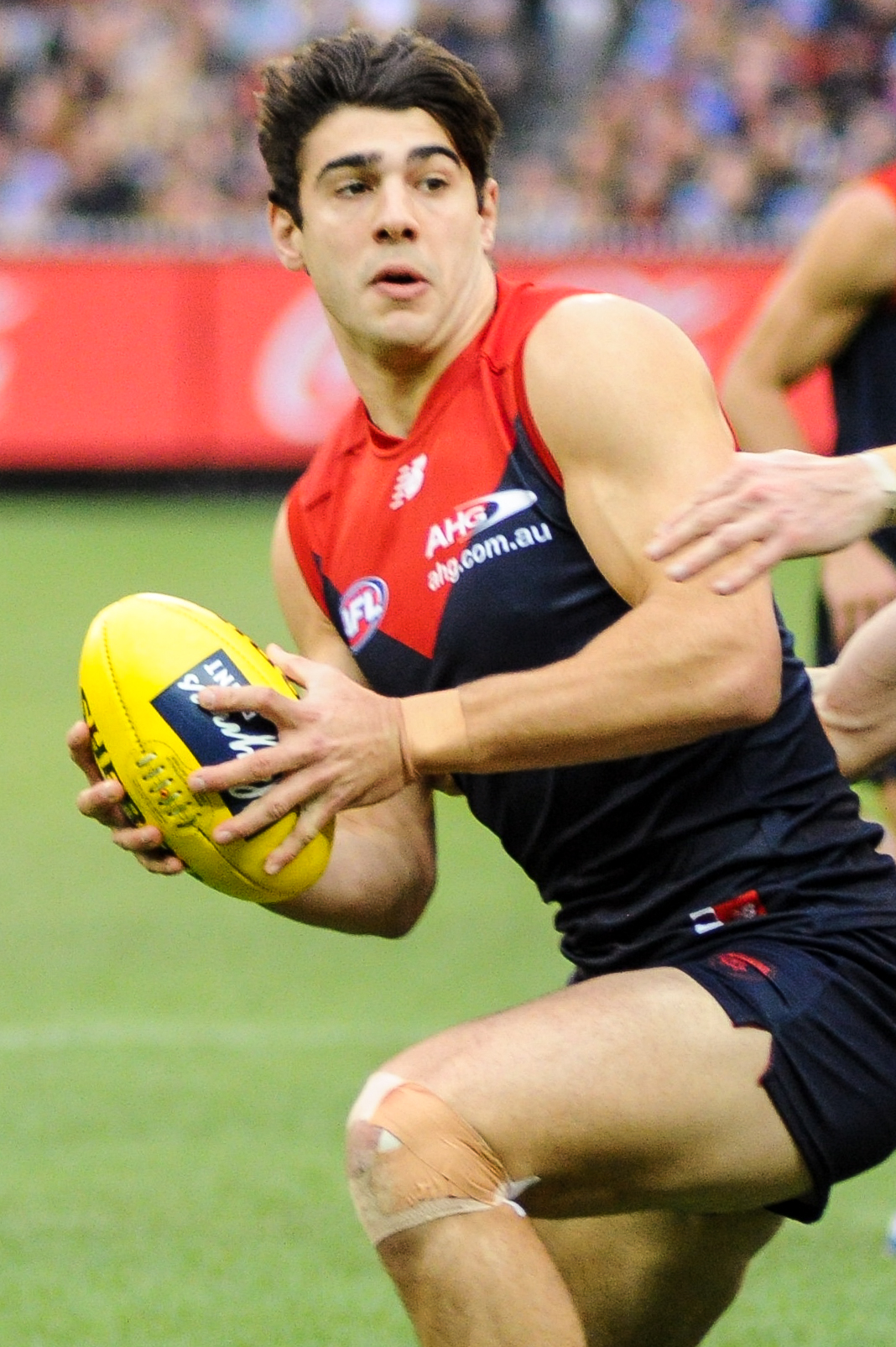
Christian Petracca was one of four Melbourne players to be nominated for the Rising Star in 2016.

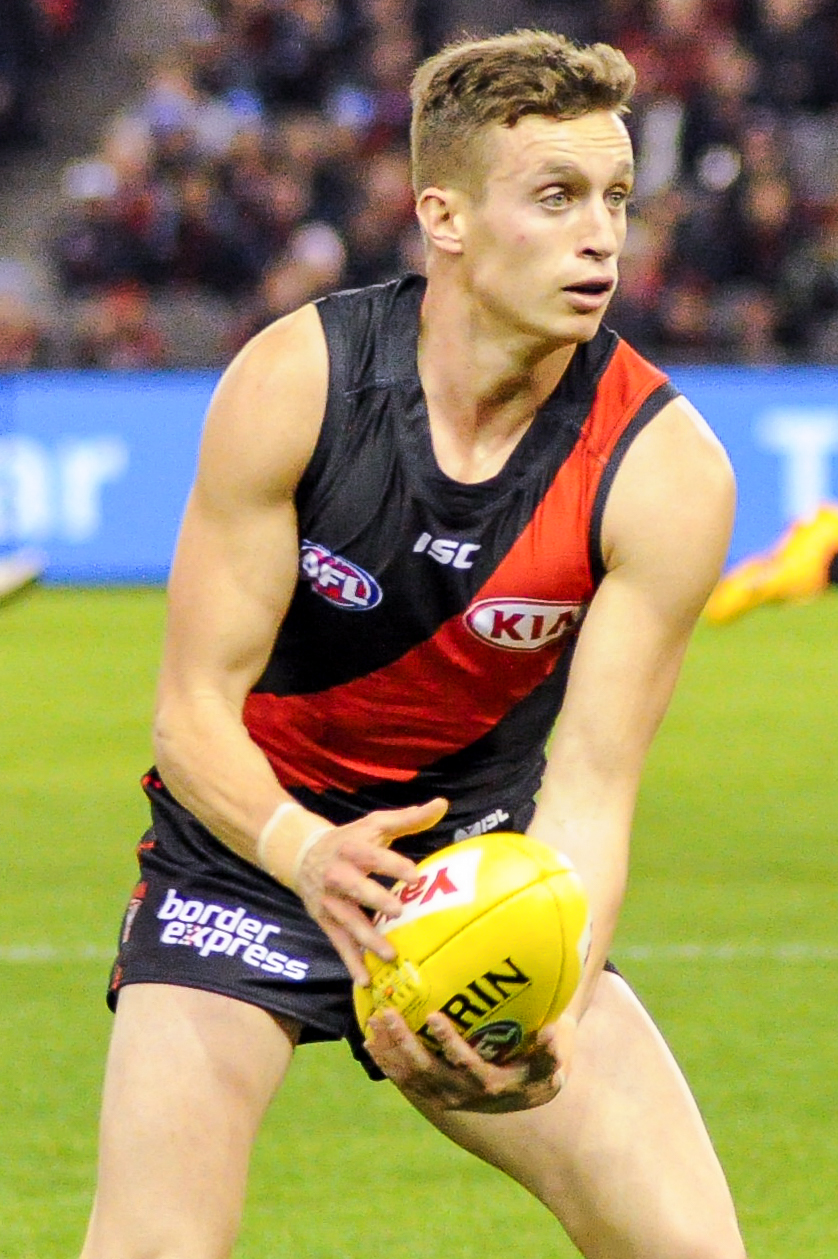
Orazio Fantasia, who received a nomination in round 17, was also nominated for the award in the 2015 season.

Table of nominees
Player	Round	Club	Ref.
Clayton Oliver	1	Melbourne	
Darcy Parish	2	Essendon	
Jacob Weitering	3	Carlton	
Caleb Daniel	4	Western Bulldogs	
Tom Papley	5	Sydney	
Blake Acres	6	St Kilda	
James Harmes	7	Melbourne	
Jacob Hopper	8	Greater Western Sydney	
Christian Petracca	9	Melbourne	
Darcy Byrne-Jones	10	Port Adelaide	
Connor Blakely	11	Fremantle	
Lachie Weller	12	Fremantle	
James Sicily	13	Hawthorn	
Jade Gresham	14	St Kilda	
Peter Wright	15	Gold Coast	
Callum Mills	16	Sydney	
Orazio Fantasia	17	Essendon	
Ryan Clarke	18	North Melbourne	
Darcy Moore	19	Collingwood	
Josh Dunkley	20	Western Bulldogs	
Oscar McDonald	21	Melbourne	
Daniel Rioli	22	Richmond	
Tom Barrass	23	West Coast	

== Final voting ==
Table of votes
Player	Rank	Club	Votes
Callum Mills	1	Sydney	49
Caleb Daniel	2	Western Bulldogs	41
Jacob Weitering	3	Carlton	26
Darcy Parish	4	Essendon	19
Darcy Moore	5	Collingwood	9
Jade Gresham	6	St Kilda	2
Christian Petracca	6	Melbourne	2
Clayton Oliver	8	Melbourne	1
Lachie Weller	8	Fremantle	1
