= Darcy Byrne-Jones =

Australian rules footballer

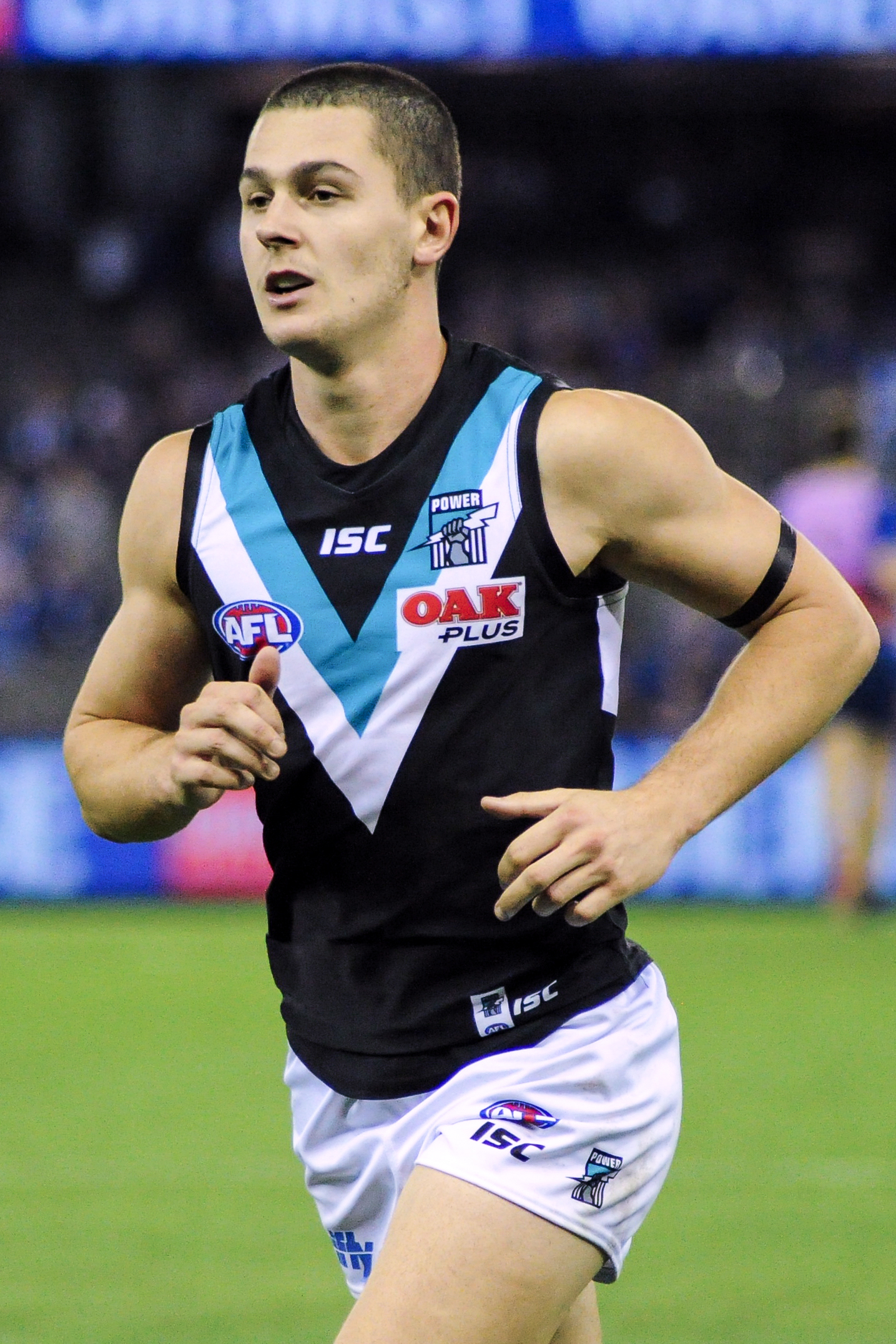
- Byrne-Jones playing for Port Adelaide in June 2018

Personal information
- Nicknames: DBJ, Hank, Burnt Toast
- Born: 20 September 1995 (age 31); Victoria
- Original team: Oakleigh Chargers (TAC Cup)
- Draft: No. 52, 2013 National Draft: Port Adelaide
- Height: 181 cm (5 ft 11 in)
- Weight: 76 kg (168 lb)
- Position: Defender / forward

Club information
- Current club: Port Adelaide
- Number: 33

Playing career^{1}
Years	Club	Games (Goals)
2014–	Port Adelaide	242 (76)
- ^{1} Playing statistics correct to the end of round 22, 2026.

Career highlights
- All-Australian: 2020; John Cahill Medal: 2020; AFL Rising Star nominee: 2016

Darcy Byrne-Jones (born 20 September 1995) is an Australian rules footballer currently playing for the Port Adelaide Football Club in the Australian Football League (AFL). At 181 cm (5 ft 11 in) tall and 76 kg (168 lb), he plays as a running half-back who can move up forward or play as a wingman. He grew up in eastern suburbs of Melbourne. He played top-level junior football with the Oakleigh Chargers in the TAC Cup.

Port Adelaide took Byrne-Jones with the 52nd selection in the 2013 AFL draft. Since then, he has been a AFL Rising Star nominee, All-Australian and a John Cahill Medalist

== Early football ==
He attended Scotch College, Melbourne with fellow draftees Jack Billings, Jake Kelly and Jack Sinclair. He played junior football for Camberwell Sharks in the Yarra Junior Football League.

== AFL career ==
Byrne-Jones made his AFL debut in the third round of the 2016 AFL season, kicking his first goal with blood running down his face due to a previous collision with a teammate.

Byrne-Jones won a NAB Rising Star nomination in Round 10 of the 2016 AFL Season after tallying 23 disposals while keeping Melbourne's Jeff Garlett to just 9 disposals and a goal.

In 2016, Port Adelaide rookie Darcy Byrne-Jones re-signed with the club until the end of 2018.

At the start of the 2018 AFL season Byrne-Jones signed another two-year contract extension to remain at Port Adelaide until the end of 2020.

Byrne-Jones had a breakout season in 2019, averaging 22.4 disposals - up from his career average of 17 and finishing second in Port Adelaide's best and fairest award. After the season Byrne-Jones signed a three-year contract extension which would keep him at the club until the end of 2023.

The 2020 AFL season was a career-best year for Byrne-Jones. He played all 19 Port Adelaide games of the shortened COVID-19 season and averaged 16.9 disposals per game and was a leading defender in the competition for intercept possessions and pressure acts earning his first All-Australian selection and winning the John Cahill Medal.

== Statistics ==
Updated to the end of round 22, 2026.

Legend
G	Goals	K	Kicks	D	Disposals	T	Tackles
B	Behinds	H	Handballs	M	Marks

Season	Team	No.	Games	Totals							Averages (per game)							Votes
Season	Team	No.	Games	G	B	K	H	D	M	T	G	B	K	H	D	M	T	Votes
2016	Port Adelaide	33	20	3	1	192	120	312	63	47	0.2	0.1	9.6	6.0	15.6	3.2	2.4	0
2017	Port Adelaide	33	23	1	3	239	134	373	93	65	0.0	0.1	10.4	5.8	16.2	4.0	2.8	1
2018	Port Adelaide	33	21	2	2	246	119	365	89	66	0.1	0.1	11.7	5.7	17.4	4.2	3.1	2
2019	Port Adelaide	33	22	0	3	332	160	492	112	66	0.0	0.1	15.1	7.3	22.4	5.1	3.0	2
2020 (Note: The 2020 season was played with 17 home-and-away matches per team (down from 22) and 16-minute quarters with time on (down from 20-minute quarters with time on) due to the impact of the COVID-19 pandemic.)	Port Adelaide	33	19	0	2	204	116	320	64	35	0.0	0.1	10.7	6.1	16.8	3.4	1.8	2
2021	Port Adelaide	33	24	0	2	301	179	480	104	66	0.0	0.1	12.5	7.5	20.0	4.3	2.8	0
2022	Port Adelaide	33	21	1	2	273	183	456	112	39	0.0	0.1	13.0	8.7	21.7	5.3	1.9	0
2023	Port Adelaide	33	23	18	17	192	100	292	68	66	0.8	0.7	8.3	4.3	12.7	3.0	2.9	0
2024	Port Adelaide	33	26	28	17	196	97	293	66	77	1.1	0.7	7.5	3.7	11.3	2.5	3.0	0
2025	Port Adelaide	33	22	19	8	180	100	280	71	41	0.9	0.4	8.2	4.5	12.7	3.2	1.9	0
2026	Port Adelaide	33	21	4	2	271	150	421	110	40	0.2	0.1	12.9	7.1	20.0	5.2	1.9	0
Career			242	76	59	2626	1458	4084	952	608	0.3	0.2	10.9	6.0	16.9	3.9	2.5	7
