= Will Snelling =

Australian rules footballer (born 1997)

Personal information
- Full name: William Alexander Snelling
- Born: 6 August 1997 (age 29)
- Original teams: West Adelaide (SANFL); Goodwood Saints
- Draft: No. 10, 2016 rookie draft
- Debut: Round 23, 2016, Port Adelaide vs. Gold Coast, at Metricon Stadium
- Height: 175 cm (5 ft 9 in)
- Weight: 81 kg (179 lb)
- Position: Midfielder / forward

Playing career^{1}
Years	Club	Games (Goals)
2016–2018	Port Adelaide	1 (1)
2019–2023	Essendon	64 (28)
Total		65 (29)
- ^{1} Playing statistics correct to the end of 2023.

Career highlights
- Magarey Medal: 2024; SANFL Now Player of the Year: 2024

William Alexander Snelling (born 6 August 1997) is an Australian rules footballer who most recently played for the Essendon Football Club in the Australian Football League (AFL). He currently plays for Sturt in the South Australian National Football League (SANFL).

== AFL career ==
=== Port Adelaide ===
Snelling was first drafted by Port Adelaide with their first selection and tenth overall in the 2016 rookie draft. He played his only senior AFL game for Port Adelaide in their twenty-three point win against Gold Coast in round 23, 2016 at Metricon Stadium. He was delisted by Port Adelaide at the end of the 2018 AFL season.

=== Essendon ===
After being overlooked by all clubs in the 2018 AFL draft, Snelling played for West Adelaide in the South Australian National Football League. He was subsequently selected by Essendon in the 2019 mid-season rookie draft, at pick 7. In round 18 he made his debut for Essendon at Adelaide Oval. He played in the Bombers' next two games against Gold Coast and his former club Port Adelaide before he suffered foot soreness and lost his position in the senior side.

Snelling established himself in Essendon’s best side in 2020, playing every game and finishing ninth in the club's best and fairest award. He signed a one-year contract extension for 2021 at the end of the 2020 season. Snelling was delisted at the end of the 2023 season amid the recruiting of Jade Gresham from St Kilda.

=== Sturt (SANFL) ===
Snelling signed for Sturt in the SANFL for the 2024 season. In his first season at Sturt, Snelling was the joint winner of the Magarey Medal, and won the SANFL Now Player of the Year award. Snelling also represented the SANFL state team in a State Game against the VFL as part of the 2024 Gather Round held by the AFL.

== Statistics ==
Updated to the end of 2023.

Legend
G	Goals	K	Kicks	D	Disposals	T	Tackles
B	Behinds	H	Handballs	M	Marks

Season	Team	No.	Games	Totals							Averages (per game)						
Season	Team	No.	Games	G	B	K	H	D	M	T	G	B	K	H	D	M	T
2016	Port Adelaide	34	1	1	0	6	9	15	1	6	1.0	0.0	6.0	9.0	15.0	1.0	6.0
2017	Port Adelaide	34	0	–	–	–	–	–	–	–	–	–	–	–	–	–	–
2018	Port Adelaide	34	0	–	–	–	–	–	–	–	–	–	–	–	–	–	–
2019	Essendon	40	4	5	0	20	46	66	11	13	1.3	0.0	5.0	11.5	16.5	2.8	3.3
2020 (Note: The 2020 season was played with 17 home-and-away matches per team (down from 22) and 16-minute quarters with time on (down from 20-minute quarters with time on) due to the impact of the COVID-19 pandemic.)	Essendon	40	17	5	2	71	151	222	29	79	0.3	0.1	4.2	8.9	13.1	1.7	4.6
2021	Essendon	40	20	12	7	155	199	354	74	99	0.6	0.4	7.8	10.0	17.7	3.7	5.0
2022	Essendon	11	8	0	0	41	66	107	24	28	0.0	0.0	5.1	8.3	13.4	3.0	3.5
2023	Essendon	11	15	6	3	89	82	171	44	47	0.4	0.2	5.9	5.5	11.4	2.9	3.1
Career			65	29	12	382	553	935	183	272	0.4	0.2	5.9	8.5	14.4	2.8	4.2

== Honours and achievements ==
=== Individual ===
- Magarey Medal: 2024
- SANFL Now Player of the Year: 2024
