= Jacob Hopper =

Australian rules footballer

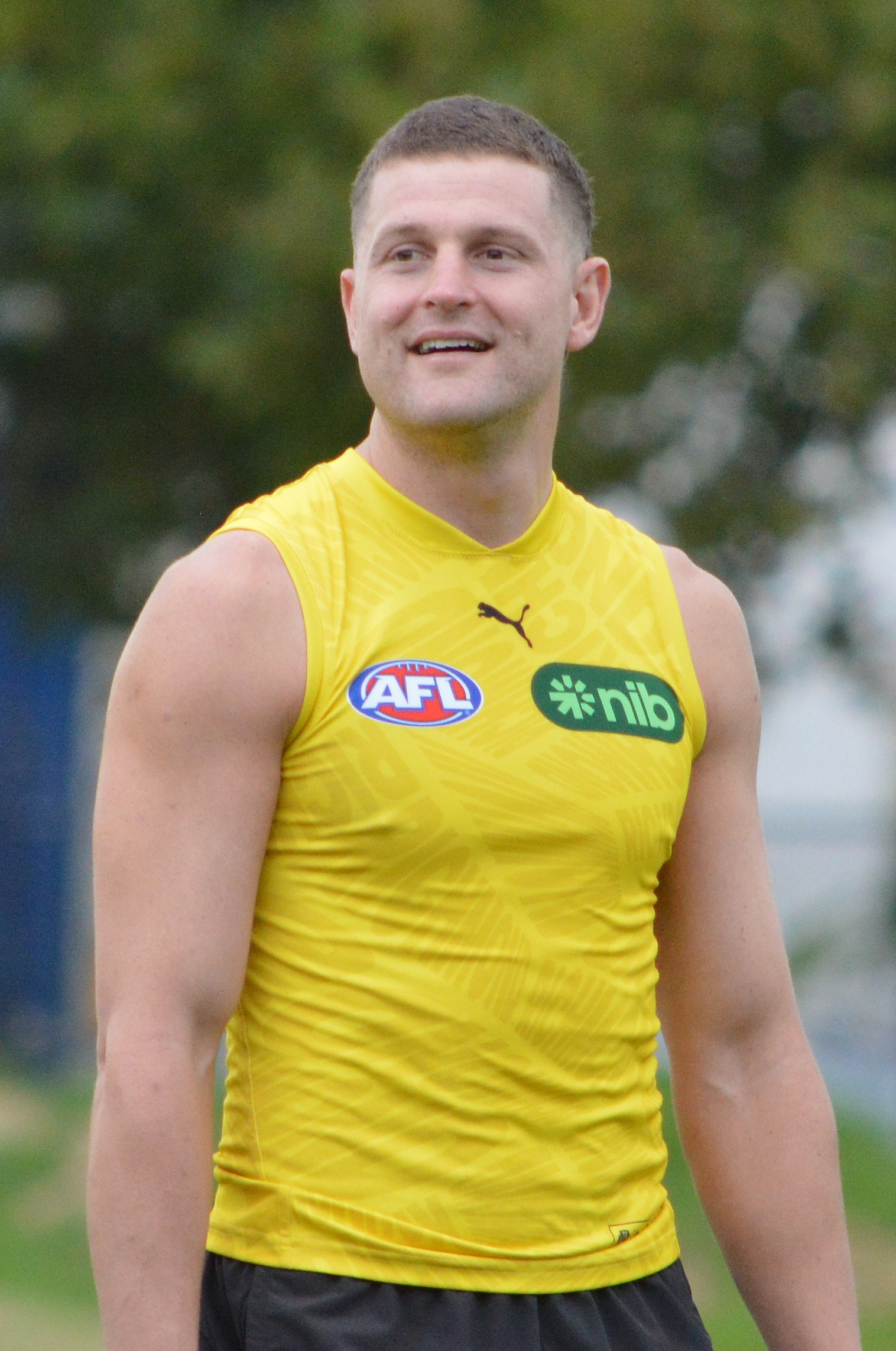
- Hopper in March 2026

Personal information
- Full name: Jacob Hopper
- Born: 6 February 1997 (age 29); Leeton, New South Wales
- Original team: North Ballarat Rebels (TAC Cup)/Leeton-Whitton (RFNL)
- Draft: No. 7, 2015 national draft
- Height: 187 cm (6 ft 2 in)
- Weight: 88 kg (194 lb)
- Position: Midfielder

Club information
- Current club: Richmond
- Number: 2

Playing career^{1}
Years	Club	Games (Goals)
2016–2022	Greater Western Sydney	114 (42)
2023–	Richmond	63 (16)
Total		177 (58)
- ^{1} Playing statistics correct to the end of 2026.

Career highlights
- AFL Rising Star nominee: 2016; Brett Kirk Medal: 2019

Jacob Hopper (born 6 February 1997) is a professional Australian rules footballer for the Richmond Football Club in the Australian Football League (AFL), having previously played for Greater Western Sydney.

== Early life ==
Hopper was born in New South Wales and grew up in the small Riverina town of Leeton. He began playing football at the age of four with the Leeton-Whitton Crows where his father coached. He joined Greater Western Sydney's academy program at the age of 13 and regularly gained selection for NSW representative teams in the years that followed. He attended school at St Francis de Sales Regional College. At the age of 17, he began boarding at St Patrick's College, Ballarat while playing TAC Cup football for the North Ballarat Rebels.

He was recruited by the Greater Western Sydney Giants with the seventh overall selection in the 2015 national draft.

== AFL career ==
Hopper made his debut in round 8 of the 2016 AFL season, in a 91-point win against Gold Coast at Spotless Stadium. He was rewarded with a nomination for the 2016 AFL Rising Star, after he collected 32 disposals equaling the AFL record (since 1992) for most disposals made on debut (Brisbane Lion Bradd Dalziell's 32 in 2008 the previous highest). and nine clearances.

At the conclusion of the 2022 AFL season, Hopper requested a trade to Richmond. He was traded on 11 October.

== Statistics ==
Updated to the end of round 22, 2026.

Legend
G	Goals	K	Kicks	D	Disposals	T	Tackles
B	Behinds	H	Handballs	M	Marks

Season	Team	No.	Games	Totals							Averages (per game)							Votes
Season	Team	No.	Games	G	B	K	H	D	M	T	G	B	K	H	D	M	T	Votes
2016	Greater Western Sydney	2	10	5	3	65	107	172	32	33	0.5	0.3	6.5	10.7	17.2	3.2	3.3	0
2017	Greater Western Sydney	2	13	4	4	89	133	222	35	74	0.3	0.3	6.8	10.2	17.1	2.7	5.7	0
2018	Greater Western Sydney	2	21	10	14	214	227	441	55	98	0.5	0.7	10.2	10.8	21.0	2.6	4.7	0
2019	Greater Western Sydney	2	23	10	11	303	296	599	73	95	0.4	0.5	13.2	12.9	26.0	3.2	4.1	1
2020 (Note: The 2020 season was played with 17 home-and-away matches per team (down from 22) and 16-minute quarters with time on (down from 20-minute quarters with time on) due to the impact of the COVID-19 pandemic.)	Greater Western Sydney	2	17	1	7	159	167	326	40	72	0.1	0.4	9.4	9.8	19.2	2.4	4.2	4
2021	Greater Western Sydney	2	23	10	7	311	295	606	72	88	0.4	0.3	13.5	12.8	26.3	3.1	3.8	15
2022	Greater Western Sydney	2	7	2	1	57	78	135	20	21	0.3	0.1	8.1	11.1	19.3	2.9	3.0	0
2023	Richmond	22	16	7	4	162	180	342	55	64	0.4	0.3	10.1	11.3	21.4	3.4	4.0	1
2024	Richmond	22	12	3	4	132	153	285	44	41	0.3	0.3	11.0	12.8	23.8	3.7	3.4	0
2025	Richmond	2	23	6	7	257	350	607	75	71	0.3	0.3	11.2	15.2	26.4	3.3	3.1	5
2026	Richmond	2	12	0	3	116	141	257	28	31	0.0	0.3	9.7	11.8	21.4	2.3	2.6	0
Career			177	58	65	1865	2127	3992	529	688	0.3	0.4	10.5	12.0	22.6	3.0	3.9	26

== Honours and achievements ==
- Greater Western Sydney Giants Academy Player Of The Year: 2015
- 2016 AFL Rising Star: nominee
- Greater Western Sydney Giants Rising Star: 2016
- Brett Kirk Medal: 2019
