= Darcy Parish =

Australian rules footballer (born 1997)

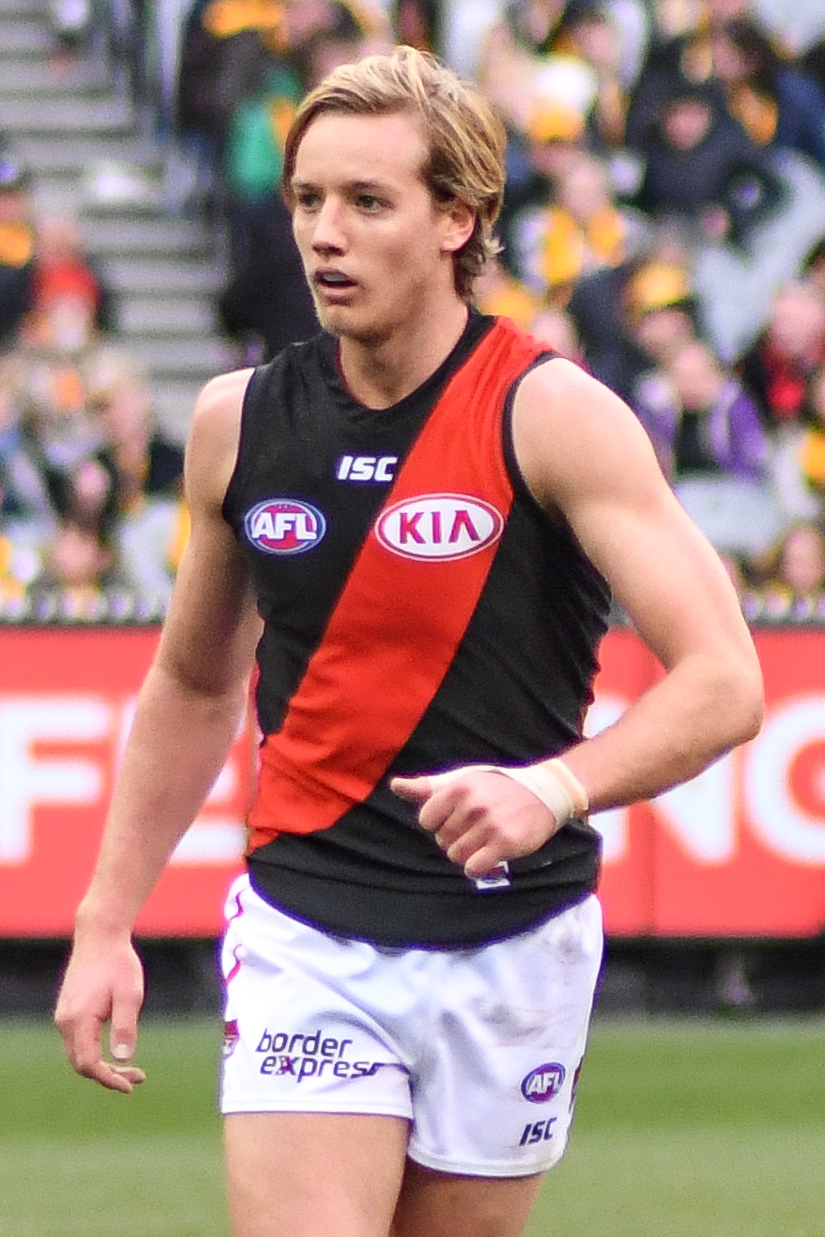
- Parish playing for Essendon in August 2018

Personal information
- Full name: Darcy Parish
- Nickname: Pish Posh Parish
- Born: 25 July 1997 (age 29); Winchelsea, Victoria
- Original team: Geelong Falcons (TAC Cup)
- Draft: No. 5, 2015 national draft
- Height: 180 cm (5 ft 11 in)
- Weight: 81 kg (179 lb)
- Position: Midfielder

Club information
- Current club: Essendon
- Number: 3

Playing career^{1}
Years	Club	Games (Goals)
2016–	Essendon	179 (57)
- ^{1} Playing statistics correct to the end of 2026.

Career highlights
- All-Australian team: 2021; Anzac Day Medal: 2021; Yiooken Award: 2021, 2026; Tom Wills Medal: 2021; AFL Rising Star nominee: 2016

Darcy Parish (born 25 July 1997) is a professional Australian rules footballer with the Essendon Football Club in the Australian Football League (AFL).

== Early life ==
Parish was born in Winchelsea, Victoria. He participated in the Auskick program at the local Winchelsea club. He played under-18 football with the Geelong Falcons in the TAC Cup.

Parish was recruited by the Essendon Football Club with the fifth overall selection in the 2015 national draft.

== AFL career ==
Parish was recruited by the Essendon Football Club with the fifth overall selection in the 2015 national draft. He was considered one of the best midfielders in the 2015 draft crop, showing tremendous form averaging 28 disposals at TAC Cup level (16 contested and 12 uncontested), plus seven clearances and five inside-50 entries, showing his all-round quality for the Geelong Falcons. He was named All-Australian in 2014 and backed it up with another selection after the 2015 AFL Under-18 Championships, and he was a member of the NAB AFL Academy squad.

He made his debut in the opening round of the 2016 AFL season against Gold Coast at Metricon Stadium. He was rewarded with a nomination for the 2016 AFL Rising Star after he collected 21 disposals, 13 handball receives, eight tackles, and five inside-50s whilst kicking his first goal in the dying stages to seal a 13-point win against Melbourne. He played 20 games in his debut season, polling 19 votes to finish fourth in the Ron Evans Medal.

He was played mainly on the wing and as a forward over his first 5 years in the competition. Following a spate of injuries early in 2021 to Essendon midfielders, Parish was moved into the centre square. Parish's form suddenly skyrocketed as he became one of the most dominant midfielders in the league, winning best-on-ground medals in the ANZAC Day match, Dreamtime at the 'G, and the Country Game, the latter two being all the more impressive due to being earned in large defeats. He broke Essendon's all-time disposal record against Richmond, was named in the All-Australian team, and finished 5th in the Brownlow Medal, recording 26 votes after only polling in 1 of his 93 games prior.

Parish struggled to maintain that form over the next couple of seasons, as he was hampered by injuries, however he still polled 15 votes in the 2023 Brownlow Medal count. At the end of the 2023 season, he signed a 5-year extension with Essendon, to keep him at the club until the end of the 2028 season. 2024 was another injury interrupted season for Parish, only managing 12 games for the season.

== Statistics ==
Updated to the end of 2026.

Legend
G	Goals	K	Kicks	D	Disposals	T	Tackles
B	Behinds	H	Handballs	M	Marks
†	Led the league for the season

Season	Team	No.	Games	Totals							Averages (per game)							Votes
Season	Team	No.	Games	G	B	K	H	D	M	T	G	B	K	H	D	M	T	Votes
2016	Essendon	3	20	6	5	149	266	415	69	66	0.3	0.3	7.5	13.3	20.8	3.5	3.3	0
2017	Essendon	3	20	7	6	195	226	421	79	65	0.4	0.3	9.8	11.3	21.1	4.0	3.3	0
2018	Essendon	3	15	5	9	141	164	305	45	52	0.3	0.6	9.4	10.9	20.3	3.0	3.5	0
2019	Essendon	3	21	12	9	223	210	433	61	80	0.6	0.4	10.6	10.0	20.6	2.9	3.8	2
2020 (Note: The 2020 season was played with 17 home-and-away matches per team (down from 22) and 16-minute quarters with time on (down from 20-minute quarters with time on) due to the impact of the COVID-19 pandemic.)	Essendon	3	17	7	4	146	179	325	27	52	0.4	0.2	8.6	10.5	19.1	1.6	3.1	0
2021	Essendon	3	23	10	8	341	360	701	96	90	0.4	0.3	14.8	15.7	30.5	4.2	3.9	26
2022	Essendon	3	16	3	6	221	280	501	59	52	0.2	0.4	13.8	17.5	31.3	3.7	3.3	6
2023	Essendon	3	18	3	6	271	284	555	78	77	0.2	0.3	15.1	15.8	30.8	4.3	4.3	15
2024	Essendon	3	12	2	4	146	149	295	55	52	0.2	0.3	12.2	12.4	24.6	4.6	4.3	1
2025	Essendon	3	3	0	1	31	57	88	7	7	0.0	0.3	10.3	19.0^{†}	29.3	2.3	2.3	0
2026	Essendon	3	14	2	5	171	172	343	52	34	0.1	0.4	12.2	12.3	24.5	3.7	2.4	0
Career			179	57	63	2035	2347	4382	628	627	0.3	0.4	11.4	13.1	24.5	3.5	3.5	50
