= Kieran Collins (Australian footballer) =

Australian rules footballer

Personal information
- Full name: Kieran Collins
- Born: 14 December 1997 (age 28)
- Original team: Dandenong Stingrays (TAC Cup)
- Draft: No. 26, 2015 national draft
- Debut: Round 9, 2016, Western Bulldogs vs. Greater Western Sydney, at Spotless Stadium
- Height: 193 cm (6 ft 4 in)
- Weight: 98 kg (216 lb)
- Position: Defender

Playing career^{1}
Years	Club	Games (Goals)
2016–2018	Western Bulldogs	1 (0)
- ^{1} Playing statistics correct to the end of 2018.

Kieran Collins (born 14 December 1997) is a former Australian rules footballer who played for the Western Bulldogs in the Australian Football League (AFL). He was drafted by the Western Bulldogs with their second selection and twenty-sixth overall in the 2015 national draft. He made his debut in the twenty-five point loss against Greater Western Sydney in round 9, 2016 at the Spotless Stadium.

Collins was delisted at the end of 2018. He signed to play with the Northern Blues in the Victorian Football League in 2019.
