= Jacob Weitering =

Australian rules footballer (born 1997)

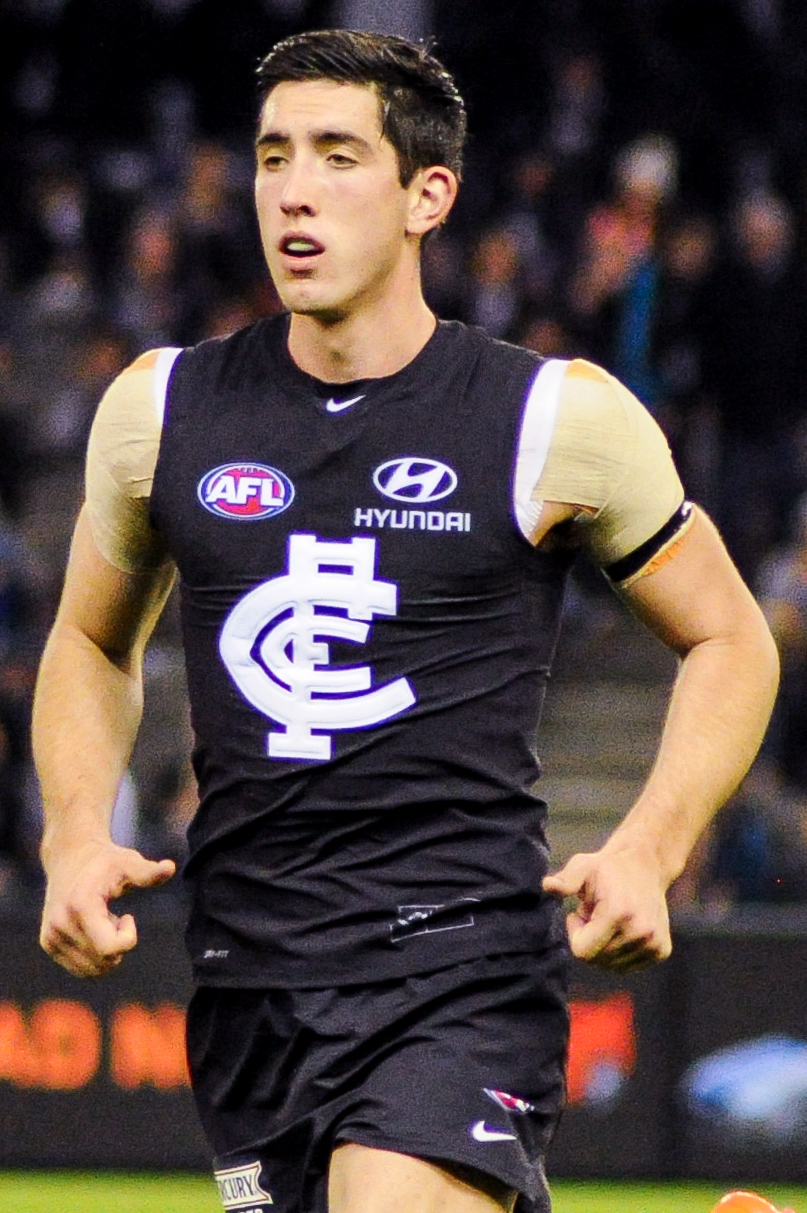
- Weitering playing for Carlton in June 2017

Personal information
- Full name: Jacob Weitering
- Born: 23 November 1997 (age 28)
- Original team: Dandenong Stingrays (TAC Cup)
- Draft: No. 1, 2015 national draft
- Height: 196 cm (6 ft 5 in)
- Weight: 101 kg (223 lb)
- Position: Key Defender

Club information
- Current club: Carlton
- Number: 23

Playing career^{1}
Years	Club	Games (Goals)
2016–	Carlton	214 (11)

Representative team honours^{2}
Years	Team	Games (Goals)
2026–	Victoria	1 (0)
- ^{1} Playing statistics correct to the end of round 22, 2026.^{2} Representative statistics correct as of 2026.

Career highlights
- Carlton Vice-Captain: 2022–; 2× John Nicholls Medal: 2020, 2023; All-Australian team: 2024; AFL Rising Star nominee: 2016; 22under22 team: 2016, 2019, 2020 (vc)

Jacob Weitering (born 23 November 1997) is an Australian rules footballer playing for the Carlton Football Club in the Australian Football League (AFL).

== Early life ==
Weitering participated in the Auskick program at Mount Martha and played junior football for the Mount Martha Junior Football Club, before playing for the Dandenong Stingrays in the TAC Cup. He captained Victoria Country at the 2015 AFL Under 18 Championships, where he was selected in the under 18 All-Australian team. He was a member of the NAB AFL Academy in 2014 and 2015, and was awarded the Ben Mitchell Medal in 2015, voted by his peers as the player who best represents the values important to the AFL Academy.

He was drafted with the first selection in the 2015 national draft by the Carlton Football Club.

== AFL career ==
Weitering made his debut in round 1, 2016 against Richmond. Weitering had a solid debut with 17 disposals and 7 marks. He was named the 2016 AFL Rising Star nominee for round 3 following an impressive display against the Gold Coast Suns in which he had 26 disposals and took nine marks.

After an impressive 2020 season, Weitering was awarded the John Nicholls Medal as Carlton's best and fairest player of the season.

In October 2024, Weitering re-signed with Carlton on a six-year contract.

== Personal life ==
In April 2023, Weitering publicly acknowledged that his entire life savings had been stolen through a sophisticated phone scam six months prior. He also made a video for his bank, NAB, as a public service announcement. Weitering said the theft has "put the brakes on" his plan to start a family.

== Statistics ==
Updated to the end of round 22, 2026.

Legend
G	Goals	K	Kicks	D	Disposals	T	Tackles
B	Behinds	H	Handballs	M	Marks
†	Led the league for the season

Season	Team	No.	Games	Totals							Averages (per game)							Votes
Season	Team	No.	Games	G	B	K	H	D	M	T	G	B	K	H	D	M	T	Votes
2016	Carlton	23	20	2	0	164	127	291	106	24	0.1	0.0	8.2	6.4	14.6	5.3	1.2	0
2017	Carlton	23	22	7	3	198	103	301	122	28	0.3	0.1	9.0	4.7	13.7	5.5	1.3	0
2018	Carlton	23	14	1	0	127	62	189	82	22	0.1	0.0	9.1	4.4	13.5	5.9	1.6	0
2019	Carlton	23	20	0	0	199	65	264	115	29	0.0	0.0	10.0	3.3	13.2	5.8	1.5	1
2020 (Note: The 2020 season was played with 17 home-and-away matches per team (down from 22) and 16-minute quarters with time on (down from 20-minute quarters with time on) due to the impact of the COVID-19 pandemic.)	Carlton	23	17	0	1	146	42	188	74	17	0.0	0.1	8.6	2.5	11.1	4.4	1.0	1
2021	Carlton	23	22	0	1	301	60	361	167	29	0.0	0.0	13.7	2.7	16.4	7.6	1.3	1
2022	Carlton	23	18	1	0	169	47	216	109	16	0.1	0.0	9.4	2.6	12.0	6.1	0.9	0
2023	Carlton	23	26	0	0	317	85	402	208^{†}	23	0.0	0.0	12.2	3.3	15.5	8.0	0.9	6
2024	Carlton	23	22	0	1	245	68	313	142	33	0.0	0.0	11.1	3.1	14.2	6.5	1.5	0
2025	Carlton	23	23	0	0	247	69	316	162	22	0.0	0.0	10.7	3.0	13.7	7.0	1.0	1
2026	Carlton	23	10	0	0	96	43	139	67	8	0.0	0.0	9.6	4.3	13.9	6.7	0.8	0
Career			214	11	6	2209	771	2980	1354	251	0.1	0.0	10.3	3.6	13.9	6.3	1.2	10
