= Callum Mills =

Australian rules footballer (born 1997)

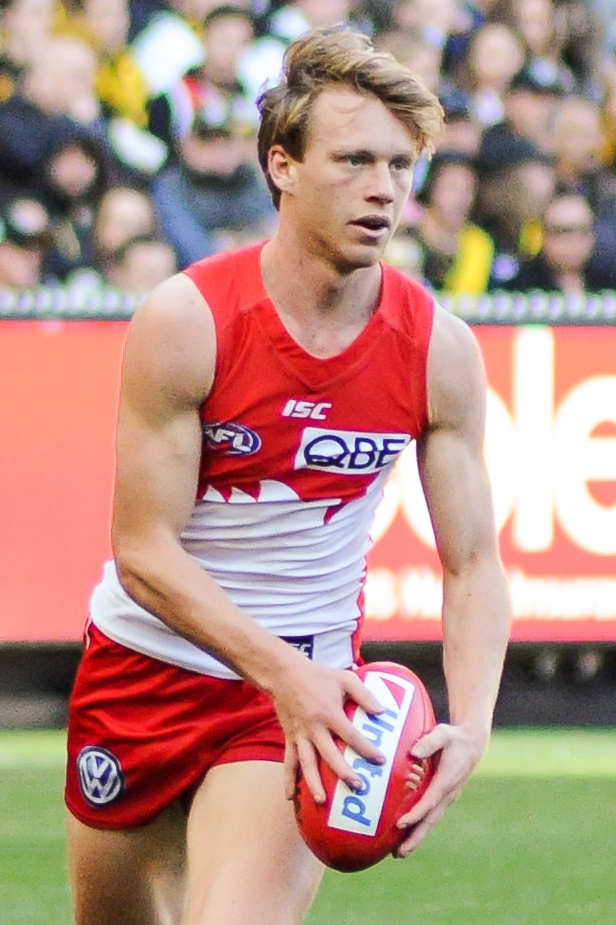
- Mills playing for Sydney in June 2017

Personal information
- Full name: Callum Mills
- Nickname: Millsy
- Born: 2 April 1997 (age 29); Sydney, New South Wales
- Original team: Mosman Swans / North Shore (Sydney AFL)/Sydney Swans Academy
- Draft: No. 3, 2015 national draft
- Debut: Round 1, 2016, Sydney vs. Collingwood, at SCG
- Height: 188 cm (6 ft 2 in)
- Weight: 87 kg (192 lb)
- Position: Midfielder

Club information
- Current club: Sydney
- Number: 14

Playing career^{1}
Years	Club	Games (Goals)
2016–	Sydney	194 (30)

Representative team honours
Years	Team	Games (Goals)
	All Stars	1 (0)
- ^{1} Playing statistics correct to the end of round 22, 2026.

Career highlights
- Sydney captain: 2022–; All Australian: 2022; Bob Skilton Medal: 2022; Ron Evans Medal: 2016; AFLPA best first year player: 2016; 3× 22under22 team: 2016, 2017, 2019; Brett Kirk Medalist: round 3, 2018

Callum Mills (born 2 April 1997) is a professional Australian rules footballer and current captain of the Sydney Swans in the Australian Football League (AFL). He has been a co-captain of the club since 2022 and the sole captain since 2024. Mills won the 2016 NAB AFL Rising Star Award for his outstanding breakout season.

== Early life ==
Mills was born in Sydney and grew up on the Northern Beaches. His grandfather Ray Mills played Australian rules football for the Perth Football Club and represented Western Australia through the 1960s. Callum was an avid Sydney Swans supporter as a child and idolised Swans' forward Tony Lockett. He began playing Australian rules football at the age of four through the Auskick junior program, but he gave the game away at seven years of age to play rugby union with his school friends. He played representative junior rugby with Warringah Rugby Club's underage representative team which won three consecutive state championships (2008-2010) alongside Brad Parker and Simon Kennewell.

In 2010, aged 13, Mills was approached by then-Sydney Swans chairman Andrew Pridham to fill in for the Mosman Swans junior Australian rules football team. He impressed enough to be placed in the Sydney Swans talent academy later that year and gave up rugby union. Mills later revealed the Swans' academy was the major influence in his decision to play Australian rules football instead of rugby union when he was a teenager. He won the under 16's best and fairest at fourteen years of age for the Mosman Swans and he was ultimately named club champion in 2012. In 2014–15, he was cleared to play in the TAC Cup competition as a member of the NSW/ACT Rams and during this period he also played four games for North Shore in the premier division of the Sydney AFL competition.

== AFL career ==
Mills was selected by the Sydney Swans with their first selection and third overall in the 2015 national draft. He was initially bid on by Melbourne, however Sydney matched the bid under the new live bidding rules implemented in the 2015 draft. He was given the number 14 guernsey, made famous by three-time Brownlow Medallist and Australian football hall of famer, Bob Skilton and former club captain and Brownlow medallist, Paul Kelly. He made his debut in the eighty point win against Collingwood, recording 18 disposals in round one, 2016. After the 38-point win against Geelong, he was the round 16 nomination for the Rising Star where he recorded 23 disposals, six marks, and four rebound-50s. He was ultimately the winner of the Rising Star, receiving the Ron Evans Medal with 49 votes out of a possible 50. He became the third Sydney Swan to win the award.

Following a promising debut season, Mills re-signed with the Swans on a five-year contract that will see him remain at the club until the end of 2023.

At the start of 2022 he was named one of Sydney's co-captains, and later that year signed a contract extension with the Swans to keep him at the club until the end of 2029. Mills later became sole captain of the Swans ahead of the 2024 AFL season.

== Statistics ==
Updated to the end of round 22, 2026.

Legend
G	Goals	K	Kicks	D	Disposals	T	Tackles
B	Behinds	H	Handballs	M	Marks

Season	Team	No.	Games	Totals							Averages (per game)							Votes
Season	Team	No.	Games	G	B	K	H	D	M	T	G	B	K	H	D	M	T	Votes
2016	Sydney	14	22	1	3	231	177	408	105	50	0.0	0.1	10.5	8.0	18.5	4.8	2.3	0
2017	Sydney	14	24	1	2	267	148	415	121	59	0.0	0.1	11.1	6.2	17.3	5.0	2.5	0
2018	Sydney	14	9	0	1	101	72	173	44	23	0.0	0.1	11.2	8.0	19.2	4.9	2.6	3
2019	Sydney	14	22	1	0	231	174	405	136	58	0.0	0.0	10.5	7.9	18.4	6.2	2.6	0
2020 (Note: The 2020 season was played with 17 home-and-away matches per team (down from 22) and 16-minute quarters with time on (down from 20-minute quarters with time on) due to the impact of the COVID-19 pandemic.)	Sydney	14	15	0	1	164	107	271	77	48	0.0	0.1	10.9	7.1	18.1	5.1	3.2	2
2021	Sydney	14	18	6	1	256	239	495	107	95	0.3	0.1	14.2	13.3	27.5	5.9	5.3	18
2022	Sydney	14	25	10	3	360	250	610	165	158	0.4	0.1	14.4	10.0	24.4	6.6	6.3	21
2023	Sydney	14	20	7	5	207	196	403	95	88	0.4	0.3	10.4	9.8	20.2	4.8	4.4	3
2024	Sydney	14	7	2	0	73	49	122	38	16	0.3	0.0	10.4	7.0	17.4	5.4	2.3	1
2025	Sydney	14	12	2	1	162	123	285	79	28	0.2	0.1	13.5	10.3	23.8	6.6	2.3	0
2026	Sydney	14	20	0	2	252	226	478	109	55	0.0	0.1	12.6	11.3	23.9	5.5	2.8	0
Career			194	30	19	2304	1761	4065	1076	678	0.2	0.1	11.9	9.1	21.0	5.5	3.5	48

== Honours and achievements ==
Team

- Minor Premiership (Sydney): 2016, 2024
- McClelland Trophy (Sydney): 2016, 2026

Individual

- Sydney captain: 2022–
- Bob Skilton Medal: 2022
- All-Australian team: 2022
- 3× 22under22 team: 2016, 2017, 2019
- Brett Kirk Medal: 2018 (round 3)
- AFL Rising Star nominee: 2016 (round 16)
