= Jade Gresham =

Australian rules footballer (born 1997)

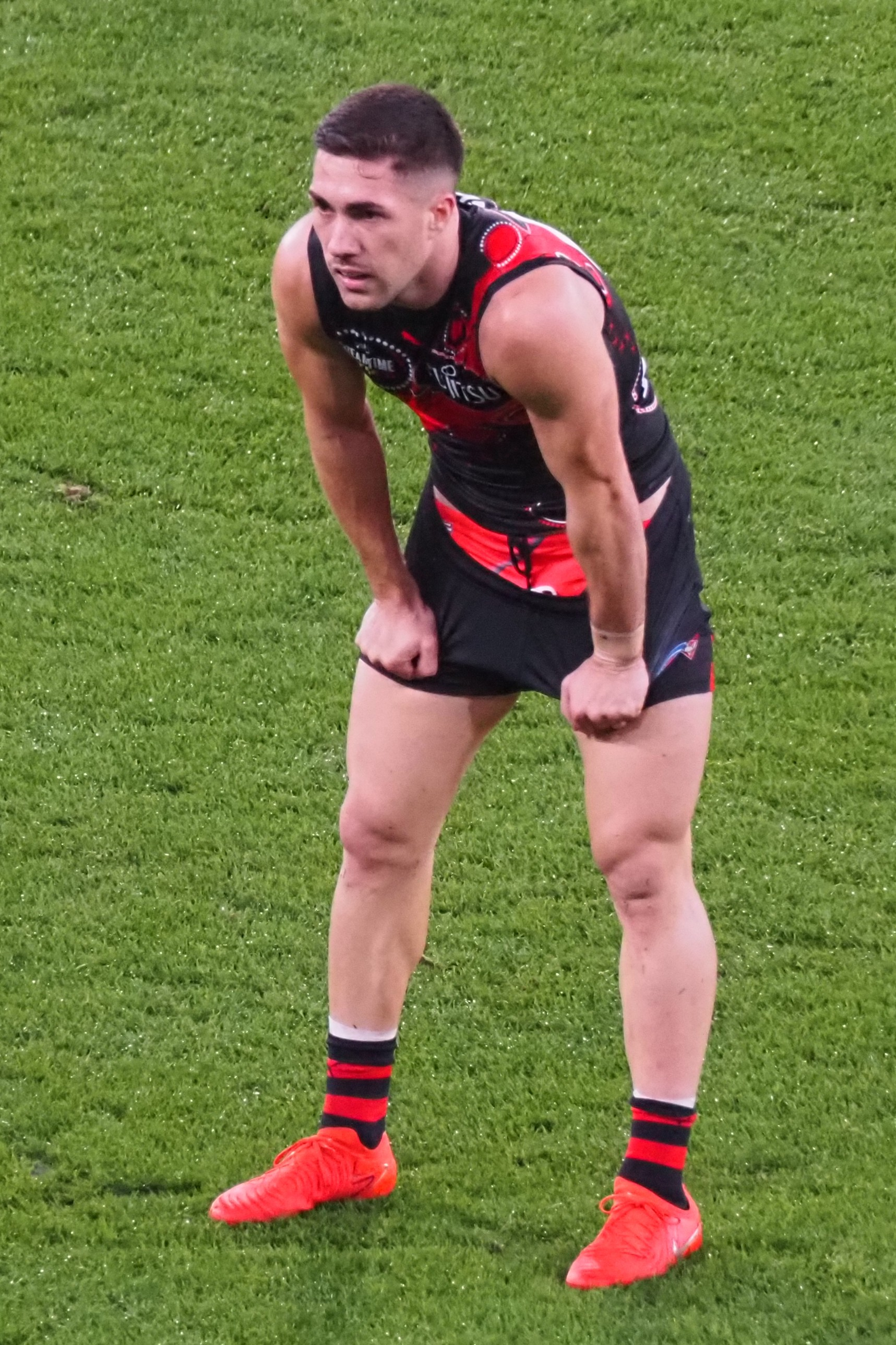
- Gresham playing for Essendon in 2025

Personal information
- Full name: Jade Gresham
- Nicknames: Gresh, Mr 67
- Born: 24 August 1997 (age 29)
- Original team: South Morang Football Netball Club(NFNL)/Northern Knights (TAC Cup)
- Draft: No. 18, 2015 National draft
- Height: 177 cm (5 ft 10 in)
- Weight: 81 kg (179 lb)
- Position: Forward / midfielder

Club information
- Current club: Essendon
- Number: 11

Playing career^{1}
Years	Club	Games (Goals)
2016–2023	St Kilda	136 (136)
2024–2026	Essendon	48 (35)
Total		184 (171)

Representative team honours
Years	Team	Games (Goals)
2020	Victoria	1 (2)
2025	Indigenous All-Stars	1 (0)
- ^{1} Playing statistics correct to the end of round 22, 2026.

Career highlights
- St Kilda leading goalkicker: 2018; 2x 22under22 team: 2018, 2019; AFL Rising Star nominee: 2016

Jade Gresham (born 24 August 1997) is an Australian rules footballer who last played for the Essendon Football Club in the Australian Football League (AFL). He was initially drafted by the St Kilda Football Club with pick 18 in the 2015 AFL draft.

== Early life and junior football ==
Of Yorta Yorta indigenous descent, Gresham was raised in the northern suburbs of Melbourne. He played junior football with South Morang Football Netball Club in the NFNL and the Northern Knights in the TAC Cup competition. Gresham was recruited by St Kilda to the AFL at pick No. 18 in the 2015 National draft.

== AFL career ==
=== St Kilda: 2016–2023 ===
He made his debut in round 1 of the 2016 AFL season against Port Adelaide at Adelaide Oval.

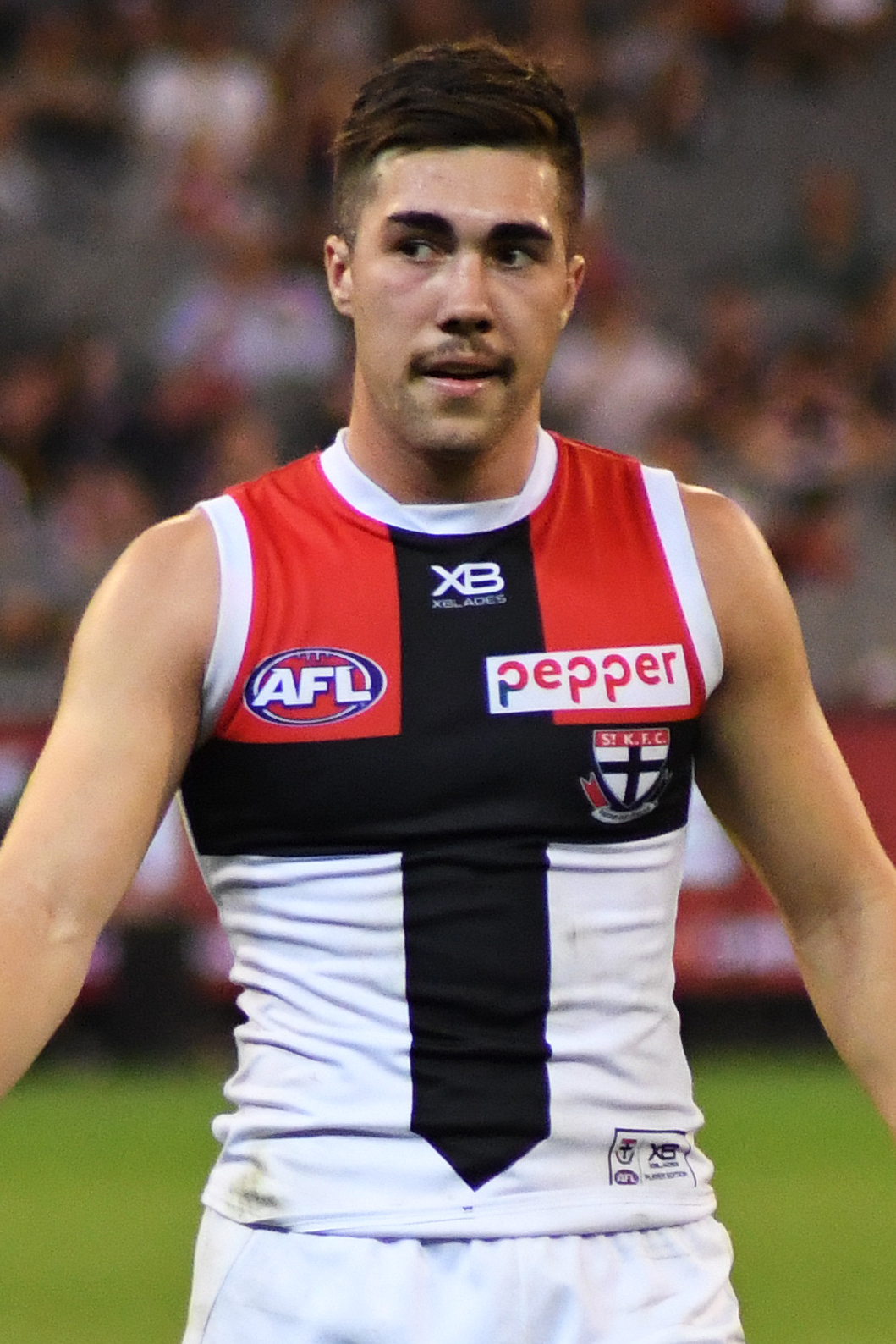
Gresham playing for St Kilda in 2019

Gresham played 18 games in the 2016 AFL premiership season, finishing with 11 goals and an average of 15 disposals per game. He was nominated for the 2016 AFL Rising Star for his efforts in the Saints' comeback victory over Geelong in Round 14, which included kicking a contender for Goal of the Year late in the match.

Prior to the 2017 season, Gresham signed a two-year contract extension with St Kilda, committing to the club until the end of the 2019 season.

Gresham played in all 22 games for the Saints in 2017. He kicked 30 goals and averaged 14 disposals.

Gresham played in all 22 games for the Saints in 2018 and led the Saints' goalkicking with 35 goals, including a career-high six goals in the Saints' round 10 loss to Richmond. In round 13, Gresham earned his third career Goal of the Year nomination as the Saints overcame a 39-point deficit to defeat the Gold Coast.

Gresham played 19 of a possible 22 games in 2019 and began to assert himself as one of the Saints' best young players, averaging 22 disposals a game. Gresham signed a four-year contract extension in May 2019, to remain a Saint until at least the end of 2023.

The 2020 season was affected by COVID-19 with the quarters reduced to 16 minutes after round one, and the regular season reduced to 17 matches per team. Gresham played the first 11 games of the season and was a key member of the Saints' midfield, but suffered a stress fracture in his back and took no further part in the 2020 campaign.

Gresham began the 2021 campaign strongly, playing the opening three rounds of the season, collecting 28 disposals against GWS and 29 disposals and a goal against Melbourne. In round three against Essendon, Gresham ruptured his Achilles tendon. The injury ruled him out of the remainder of the season as the tendon required surgery and nine months of recovery.

=== Essendon: 2024–2026 ===
Jade was signed by Essendon on a three-year contract on 13/10/2023 as a free agent with St Kilda, receiving Pick 21 (compensation). He was delisted at the end of the 2026 season.

== Personal life ==
Gresham is of Aboriginal Australian descent, hailing from the Yorta Yorta people. He and his mother, Michelle, played a key role in designing St Kilda's 2017 AFL Indigenous Round guernsey.

Gresham's father, Jamie, played u18s football with North Melbourne Football Club legend Brent Harvey. Gresham cited Harvey as a big influence on how he developed as a player before being drafted.

== Statistics ==
Updated to the end of round 22, 2026.

Legend
G	Goals	K	Kicks	D	Disposals	T	Tackles
B	Behinds	H	Handballs	M	Marks

Season	Team	No.	Games	Totals							Averages (per game)							Votes
Season	Team	No.	Games	G	B	K	H	D	M	T	G	B	K	H	D	M	T	Votes
2016	St Kilda	22	18	11	6	146	129	275	48	54	0.6	0.3	8.1	7.2	15.3	2.7	3.0	1
2017	St Kilda	4	22	30	30	196	119	315	74	55	1.4	1.4	8.9	5.4	14.3	3.4	2.5	0
2018	St Kilda	4	22	35	20	220	167	387	72	55	1.6	0.9	10.0	7.6	17.6	3.3	2.5	0
2019	St Kilda	4	19	15	13	257	173	430	71	55	0.8	0.7	13.5	9.1	22.6	3.7	2.9	5
2020 (Note: The 2020 season was played with 17 home-and-away matches per team (down from 22) and 16-minute quarters with time on (down from 20-minute quarters with time on) due to the impact of the COVID-19 pandemic.)	St Kilda	4	11	7	6	111	83	194	25	21	0.6	0.5	10.1	7.5	17.6	2.3	1.9	5
2021	St Kilda	4	3	1	0	42	21	63	12	6	0.3	0.0	14.0	7.0	21.0	4.0	2.0	1
2022	St Kilda	4	18	16	18	224	195	419	50	57	0.9	1.0	12.4	10.8	23.3	2.8	3.2	5
2023	St Kilda	4	23	21	16	229	175	404	87	74	0.9	0.7	10.0	7.6	17.6	3.8	3.2	0
2024	Essendon	11	22	19	12	158	149	307	56	47	0.9	0.5	7.2	6.8	14.0	2.5	2.1	0
2025	Essendon	11	19	10	7	122	127	249	48	55	0.5	0.4	6.4	6.7	13.1	2.5	2.9	0
2026	Essendon	11	7	6	4	42	34	76	13	19	0.9	0.6	6.0	4.9	10.9	1.9	2.7	0
Career			184	171	132	1747	1372	3119	556	498	0.9	0.7	9.5	7.5	17.0	3.0	2.7	17
