= 2021 AFL Grand Final =

Australian rules football match

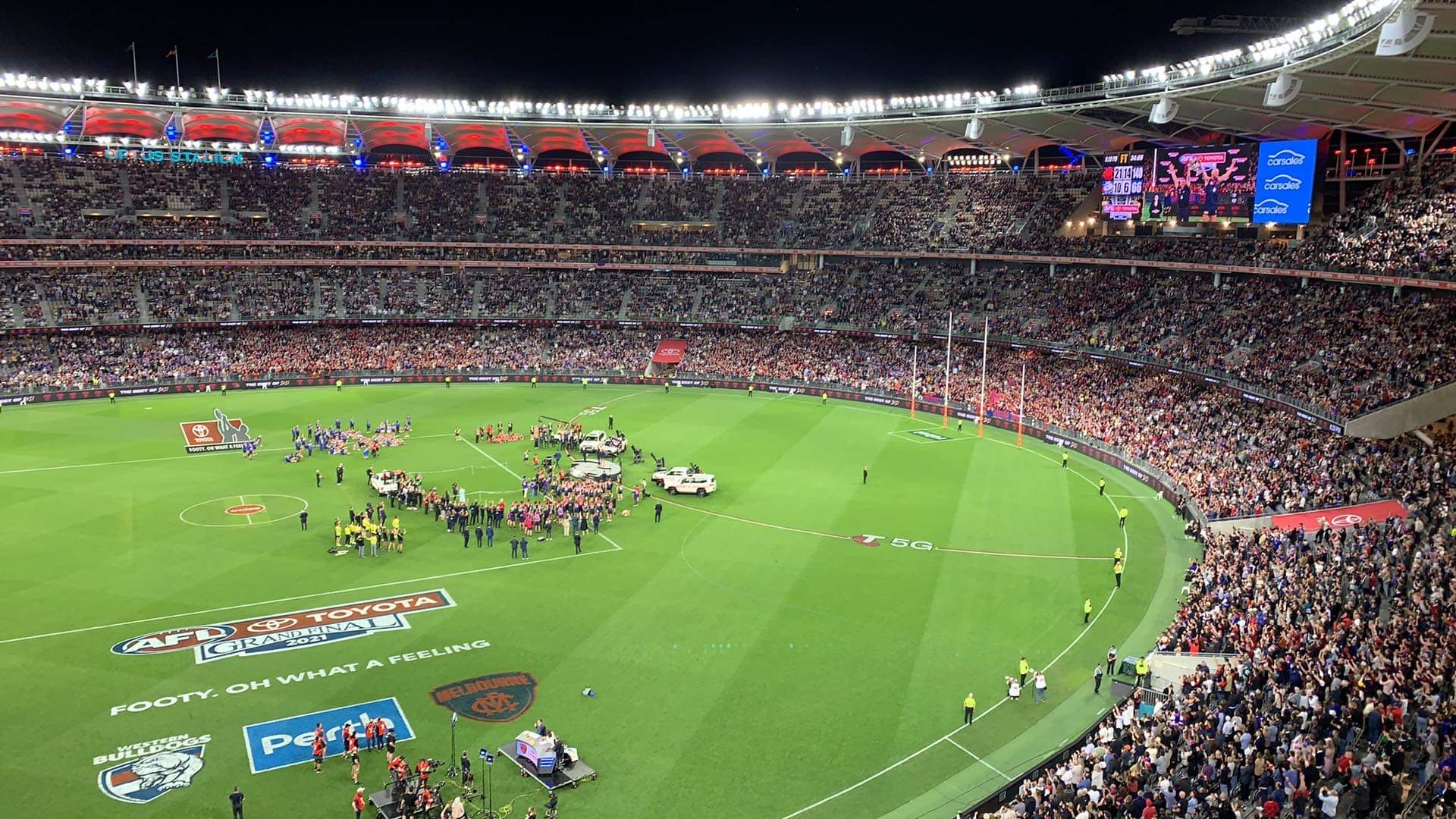
- Optus Stadium (pictured), where the 2021 AFL Grand Final was played, at the moment Simon Goodwin and Max Gawn raise the premiership cup together.

| Melbourne | Western Bulldogs |
|---|---|
| 21.14 (140) | 10.6 (66) |
| | 1 | 2 | 3 | 4 |
|---|---|---|---|---|
| MEL | 4.5 (29) | 5.9 (39) | 12.11 (83) | 21.14 (140) |
| WBD | 1.2 (8) | 7.5 (47) | 9.5 (59) | 10.6 (66) |
- Date: 25 September 2021, 5:15pm AWST
- Stadium: Perth Stadium
- Attendance: 61,118
- Favourite: Melbourne
- Umpires: Matt Stevic, Brett Rosebury, Jacob Mollison
- Coin toss won by: Melbourne
- Kicked toward: Train Station End

Ceremonies
- Pre-match entertainment: Baker Boy, Eskimo Joe, John Butler, Abbe May, Gina Williams & Guy Ghouse, Stella Donnelly, Vikki Thorn & Donna Simpson, Colin Hay (Performed from Los Angeles), Mike Brady (Performed from Melbourne)
- National anthem: Amy Manford
- Halftime show: Birds of Tokyo with the West Australian Symphony Orchestra

Accolades
- Norm Smith Medallist: Christian Petracca
- Jock McHale Medallist: Simon Goodwin

Broadcast in Australia
- Network: Seven Network
- Commentators: James Brayshaw (host and commentator); Brian Taylor (commentator); Luke Hodge (expert commentator); Daisy Pearce (expert commentator); Abbey Holmes (boundary rider); Basil Zempilas (master of ceremonies); Nathan Fyfe (analyst); Nic Naitanui (analyst)

The 2021 AFL Grand Final was an Australian rules football match contested between Melbourne and the Western Bulldogs at Optus Stadium in Perth, Western Australia, on Saturday 25 September 2021. It was the 126th annual grand final of the Australian Football League (AFL), staged to determine the premiers of the 2021 AFL season.

The match was played at Optus Stadium in Perth because an ongoing COVID-19 lockdown prevented the match from being played with spectators at its contracted ground, the Melbourne Cricket Ground in Melbourne, Victoria. It was the first grand final played in Perth and the second consecutive grand final to be played outside Victoria. The event set a new attendance record for Australian rules football in Western Australia.

Melbourne won the match by a 74-point margin, defeating the Western Bulldogs 21.14 (140) to 10.6 (66). Christian Petracca won the Norm Smith Medal. The win was Melbourne's first premiership since 1964.

== Background ==
=== Host selection process ===
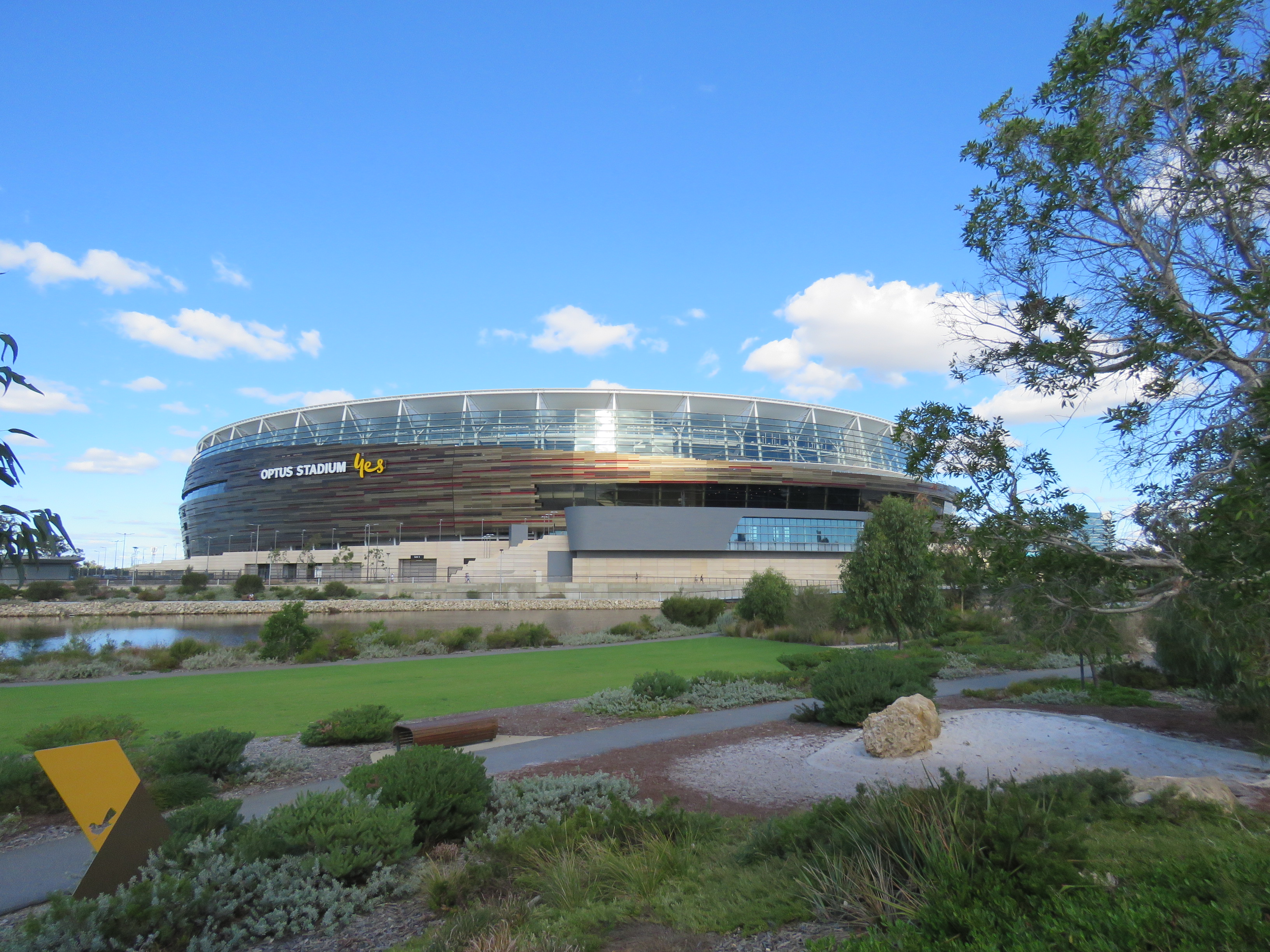
Optus Stadium, host venue of the 2021 AFL Grand Final.

For the second consecutive season, the COVID-19 pandemic caused alterations to the grand final scheduling. As the 2021 AFL finals series approached, the state of Victoria was under lockdown restrictions that made mass gatherings at stadiums impossible; the Victorian lockdown had commenced on 6 August, and case numbers continued to rise through August, resulting in repeated extensions of the lockdown. Although the league had been playing matches behind closed doors in Victoria right up to the end of the home-and-away season, it was committed to playing the finals and grand final in front of a crowd. Throughout August, contingency arrangements for the 2021 Grand Final were explored.

On 16 August, the league brought the finals one week forward, dropping the conventional pre-finals bye from the fixture; this provided flexibility for a number of COVID-impacted finals scenarios, and in particular allowed enough time for a mid-finals bye which would allow clubs to serve Western Australia's quarantine requirements without impacting the grand final date.

While the Melbourne Cricket Ground remained the default host of the game if it was possible, the State Governments of Western Australia and South Australia put forward pitches to host the game at Optus Stadium or Adelaide Oval, respectively. The Queensland Government kept the Gabba available, but it made no active pitch to host the game. On 25 August, Optus Stadium was officially announced as the standby venue for the match, in the event that the Melbourne Cricket Ground was not capable of hosting a crowd larger than Optus Stadium's 60,000-seat capacity. The reasoning given for the selection of Optus Stadium over Adelaide Oval was the restricted capacity of the latter with the South Australian Government only permitting 30,000 spectators for the match. The 'Dreamtime Game' held in Round 12 also helped the Western Australian Government's pitch, with 55,656 spectators attending the fixture that featured two Victorian clubs, Essendon and Richmond. On 31 August, shortly after Victoria's lockdown was extended into October, the switch of the venue to Optus Stadium was officially confirmed; the originally fixtured date of 25 September was confirmed, with the mid-finals bye week scheduled for the week between the preliminary finals and grand final. No back-up venue to Optus Stadium was announced, with the league intending to play the match one week later in Perth should local COVID-19 cases have resulted in a lockdown during grand final week.

The change of venue required the permission of the Victorian Government and Melbourne Cricket Club, which was contracted to host the grand final until 2058; this was obtained, in exchange for the long-term contract at the Melbourne Cricket Ground being extended by one year to 2059, eight additional home-and-away matches scheduled for the ground between 2022 and 2026, four additional AFLW matches per season scheduled for regional Victoria between 2022 and 2024, and Victoria to host the 2022 and 2023 AFL drafts.

=== Other impacts ===
The start time for the game was 5:15 pm AWST / 7:15 pm AEST, making it the first grand final played in the local twilight timeslot and second consecutive grand final in the east-coast night timeslot. The league opted for this over the traditional and originally scheduled start time of 2:30 pm AEST because this would have resulted in an impractically early local start time of 12:30 pm AWST.

At the time of the announcement, Western Australia had no spectator restrictions on major events at outdoor stadiums, as well as the strictest entry quarantine restrictions on interstate travellers. The Western Australian Government's border restrictions allowed only for those essential to the staging of the game to travel into the state, meaning guests of the clubs and league who would usually attend—such as the families of players and coaches, non-critical media or administrators, etc.—were absent. The Norm Smith Medal and Jock McHale Medal were presented by 2006 winners Andrew Embley and John Worsfold, respectively; under the convention that the medal be awarded by prior winners in chronological order, Nathan Buckley or Chris Judd would have been next in line to present the Norm Smith Medal, and Paul Roos to present the Jock McHale Medal, but they, too, were denied entry. Two Victoria-based Melbourne fans, Mark Babbage and Hayden Burbank, were convicted and spent three months in prison for illegally travelling from Melbourne to Perth via Darwin for the match.

The AFL elected not to host a full-scale grand final parade featuring the competing teams, citing threats from COVID-19, staffing availability, and terrorism, despite the state government and the Western Australian Police Force considering it safe to hold the event. The city put on a smaller-scale "people's parade" in Forrest Place on the Friday before the game, celebrating the game but not featuring the clubs.

=== Qualification ===
View source data.
Round-by-round ladder positions of the two teams during the season.

Melbourne finished the home-and-away season as minor premiers with a 17–4–1 record, its best finish since 1964. The club then recorded comfortable victories in both of its finals—by 33 points against Brisbane Lions in the qualifying final and by 83 points against Geelong in the preliminary final—to qualify. It was Melbourne's first grand final appearance since 2000, and the club was attempting to win its first premiership since 1964 and break a 57-year premiership drought, the longest active drought in the league and fourth-longest drought in league history.

The Western Bulldogs, for their part, spent much of their season in a battle with Melbourne for the minor premiership; however, after losing its last three home-and-away games, the Bulldogs slipped to fifth place on the ladder, with a record of 15–7. The club then showed strong form in the finals, defeating Essendon in the elimination final by 49 points, Brisbane Lions by one point in the semi-final, and Port Adelaide by 71 points in the preliminary final to qualify. It was the Bulldogs' first grand final berth since its victory in the 2016 decider.

The match was the second grand final between the two clubs; they had previously contested the 1954 VFL Grand Final, which was won by the Western Bulldogs (who were at the time known as Footscray). After the conclusion of both preliminary finals, Melbourne were backed as favourites, with bookmakers paying out $1.67 for a Melbourne victory; it was the first time Melbourne had entered the grand final as the favourites since 1964.

The two sides faced each other twice during 2021: Melbourne winning by 28 points at Marvel Stadium in Round 11, and the Bulldogs winning by 20 points at the Melbourne Cricket Ground in Round 19. Due to COVID-19 lockdowns in Victoria being in place at the time on both occasions, both of these matches were played behind closed doors.

== Teams ==
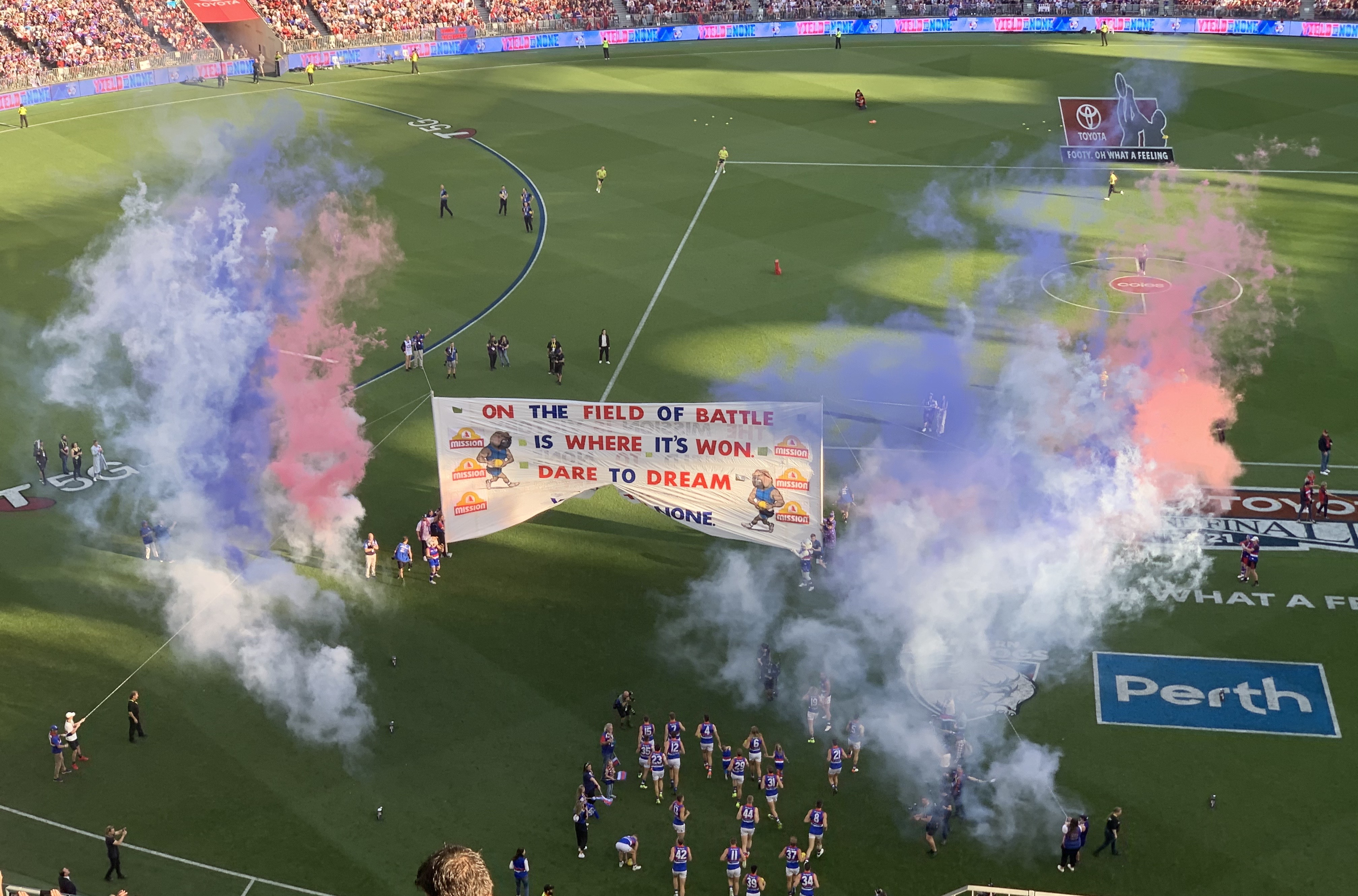
The Western Bulldogs players running through their banner. The last line reads: "Yield to none", which was the Bulldogs' finals slogan and an English translation of their club motto.

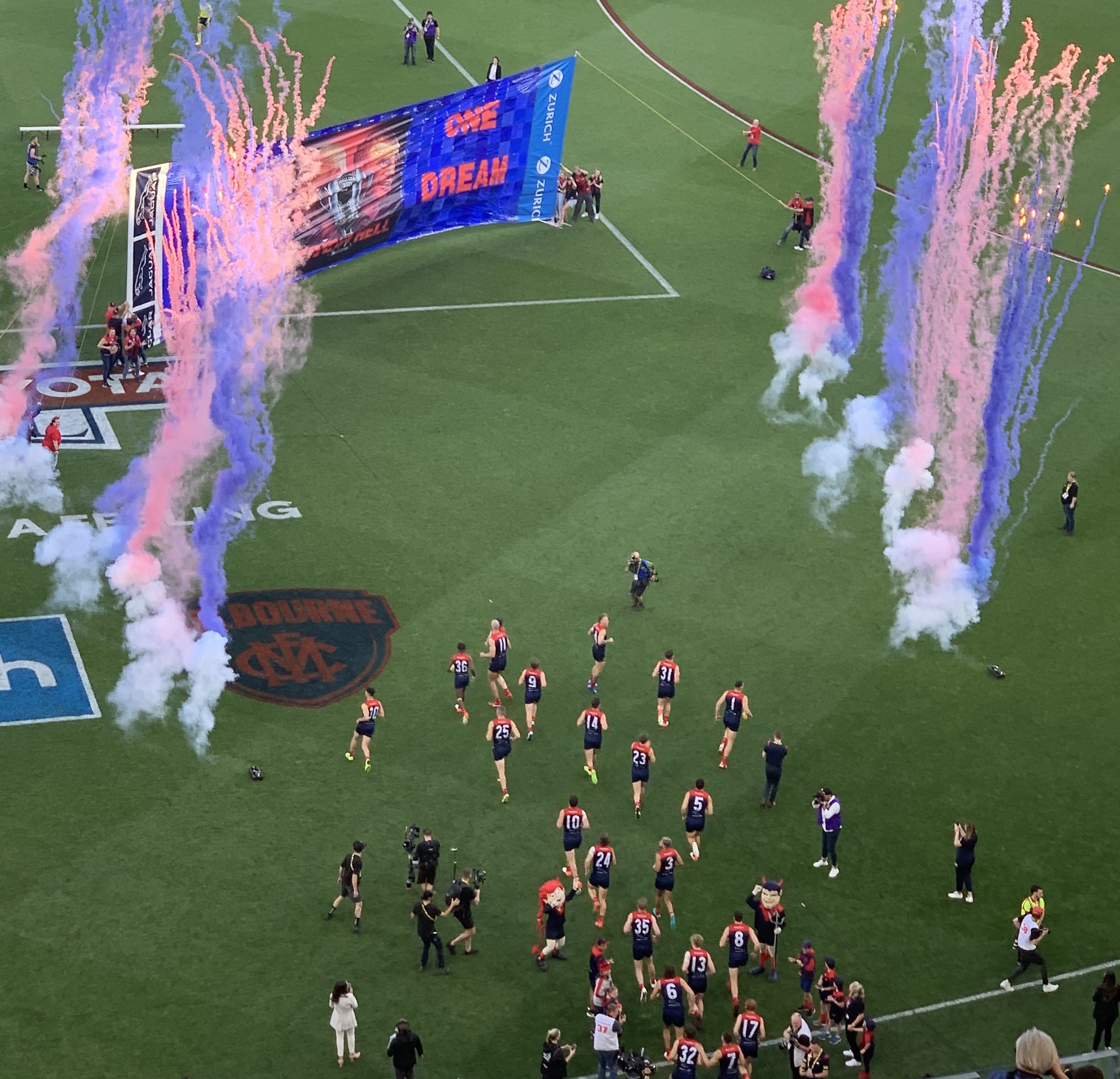
The Melbourne players running through their banner.

The Western Bulldogs made two changes to its starting 22 from the preliminary final: Cody Weightman and Alex Keath returned from injury, while Laitham Vandermeer and Ryan Gardner were omitted. Melbourne's starting 22 was unchanged. The teams' medical substitutes were not announced until immediately prior to the match. James Jordon was the medical sub for Melbourne, and Vandermeer (despite being omitted from the main 22) was selected as the Bulldogs' medical sub. The medical sub of the winning team (Jordon) was awarded a premiership medallion despite not being activated.

Both clubs wore their regular home guernseys, with the Western Bulldogs wearing white shorts as the lower-seeded club.

| Melbourne | Western Bulldogs |

Melbourne
| B: | 14 Michael Hibberd | 1 Steven May | 8 Jake Lever |
| HB: | 24 Trent Rivers | 35 Harrison Petty | 3 Christian Salem |
| C: | 10 Angus Brayshaw | 5 Christian Petracca | 15 Ed Langdon |
| HF: | 30 Alex Neal-Bullen | 25 Tom McDonald | 32 Tom Sparrow |
| F: | 9 Charlie Spargo | 50 Ben Brown | 31 Bayley Fritsch |
| Foll: | 11 Max Gawn | 13 Clayton Oliver | 7 Jack Viney |
| Int: | 4 James Harmes | 6 Luke Jackson | 17 Jake Bowey |
| Int: | 36 Kysaiah Pickett | 23 James Jordon (medi-sub) | |
| Coach: | Simon Goodwin | | |

Western Bulldogs
| B: | 10 Easton Wood | 42 Alex Keath | 34 Bailey Williams |
| HB: | 35 Caleb Daniel | 12 Zaine Cordy | 31 Bailey Dale |
| C: | 6 Bailey Smith | 21 Tom Liberatore | 7 Lachie Hunter |
| HF: | 19 Cody Weightman | 33 Aaron Naughton | 1 Adam Treloar |
| F: | 13 Josh Schache | 44 Tim English | 29 Mitch Hannan |
| Foll: | 8 Stefan Martin | 11 Jack Macrae | 4 Marcus Bontempelli |
| Int: | 39 Jason Johannisen | 5 Josh Dunkley | 15 Taylor Duryea |
| Int: | 37 Roarke Smith | 23 Laitham Vandermeer (medi-sub) | |
| Coach: | Luke Beveridge | | |

Umpires

The umpiring panel—comprising three field umpires, four boundary umpires, two goal umpires, and an emergency in each position—is given below.

2021 AFL Grand Final umpires
| Position | | | | | Emergency |
|---|---|---|---|---|---|
| Field: | 8 Brett Rosebury (9) | 9 Matt Stevic (9) | 32 Jacob Mollison (1) | | 21 Simon Meredith (6) |
| Boundary: | Michael Marantelli (5) | Christopher Gordon (5) | Matthew Konetschka (4) | Michael Barlow (1) | Ben MacDonald |
| Goal: | Steven Axon (3) | Stephen Williams (2) | | | Sam Walsh |

Numbers in brackets represent the number of grand finals umpired, including 2021.

== Entertainment ==
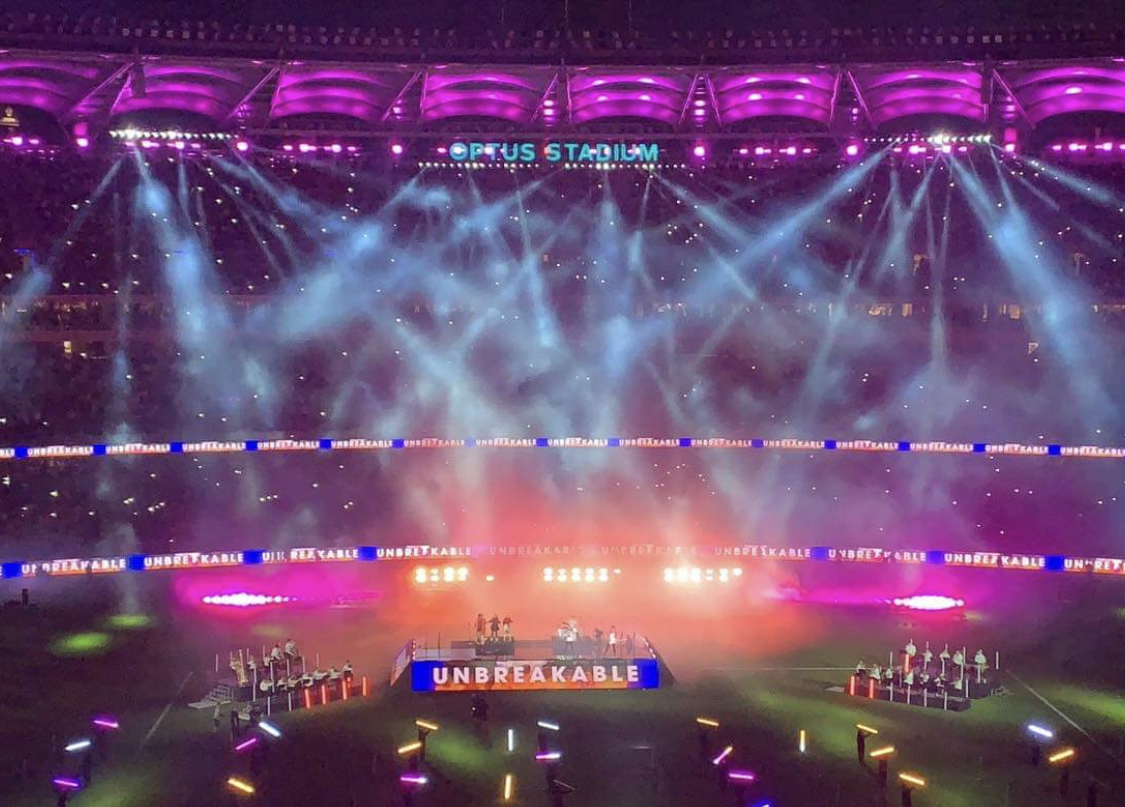
Birds of Tokyo accompanied by the West Australian Symphony Orchestra provided the half-time entertainment.

The entertainment for the 2021 AFL Grand Final heavily featured artists from Western Australia due to COVID-19 restrictions. The Welcome to Country was given by Noongar man Richard Walley. Mike Brady performed "Up There Cazaly", a song traditionally sung at AFL grand finals, remotely from a locked-down Melbourne. The pre-match live entertainment began with a performance of AC/DC's "Thunderstruck" by Abbe May from the roof of the stadium. Baker Boy performed a mashup of Kylie Minogue's "Spinning Around" and Baker Boy's "Meditjin", including a didgeridoo solo in the middle. John Butler performed Icehouse's iconic 1982 hit "Great Southern Land", joined in by Stella Donnelly, Donna Simpson and Vikki Thorn of The Waifs, Gina Williams, and Guy Ghouse. Eskimo Joe performed "Black Fingernails, Red Wine" and INXS's "Kick", featuring saxophonist Erin Royer. Colin Hay from Men At Work performed "Land Down Under" from a beach in Los Angeles, joined in by the rest of the performers live at the stadium. Soprano Amy Manford performed Australia's national anthem, "Advance Australia Fair".

At half-time, Birds of Tokyo and the West Australian Symphony Orchestra performed "Lanterns", a cover of Silverchair's "Straight Lines", and "Unbreakable".

== Match summary ==
There were no late changes for either team.

=== First quarter ===
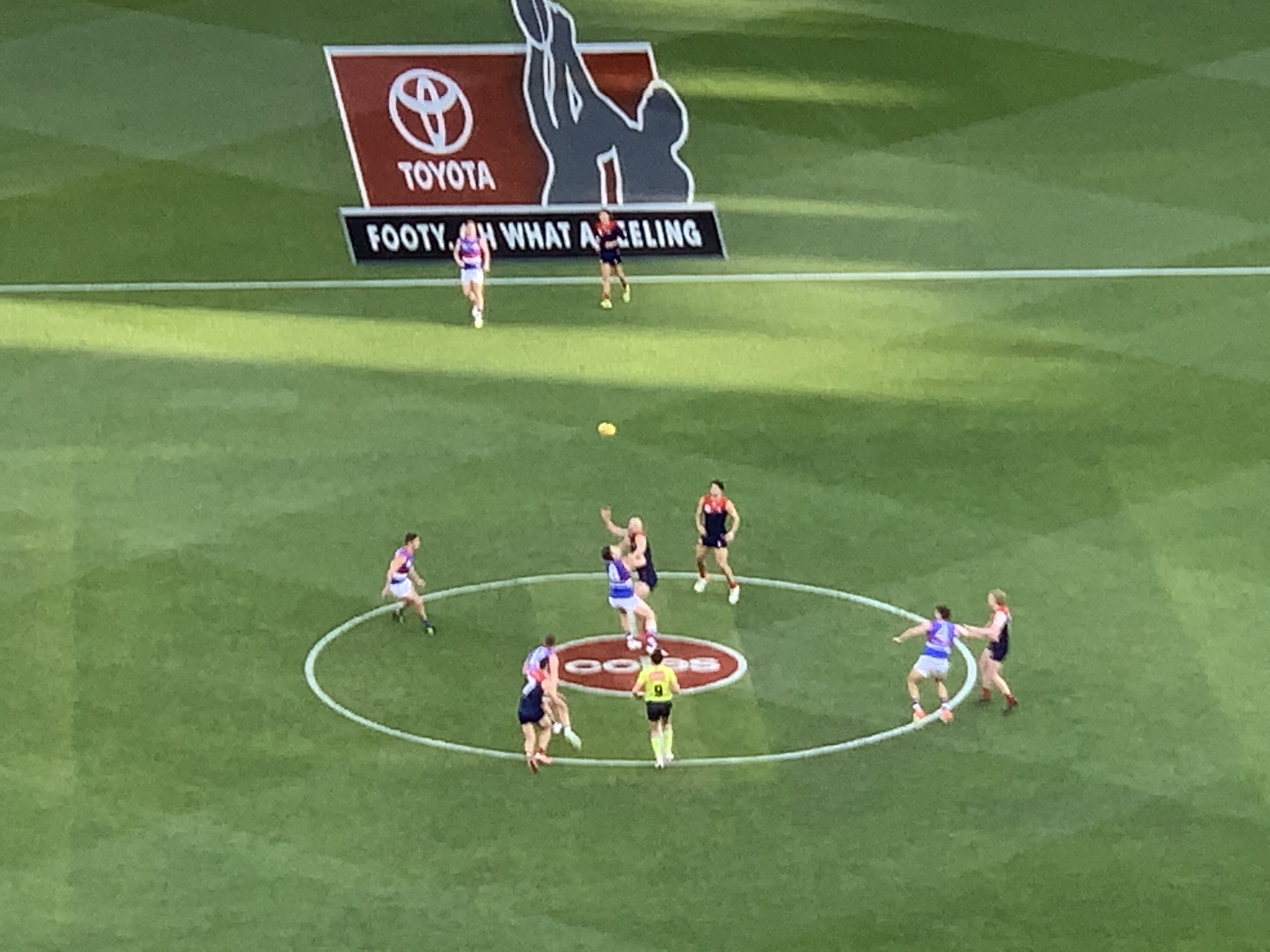
Stefan Martin (Western Bulldogs) and Max Gawn (Melbourne) contest the opening bounce of the game.

After a few early misses by Melbourne early in the first quarter, the first goal was scored by Melbourne's Christian Petracca from the 50-metre (160 ft) arc from about a 40-degree angle. Cody Weightman collided with a goal post after attempting a mark near the goal line. A fumble by the Bulldogs' Bailey Williams in Melbourne's forward half allowed Charlie Spargo to pick up the ball and score a goal – Melbourne's third overall. Williams would then drop a mark and give another goal to Bayley Fritsch two minutes later. The quarter ended with Melbourne 21 points ahead, having scored four goals to the Western Bulldogs' one.

=== Second quarter ===
The momentum of the game shifted to the Bulldogs in the second quarter. Adam Treloar started off by kicking back-to-back goals. Just after that, Aaron Naughton kicked the Bulldogs' third goal in four minutes. Melbourne's Max Gawn scored what he initially thought to be a goal, but the goal umpire deemed it a behind as it had passed over the goal post. Ultimately, the Bulldogs scored six goals to one in the second quarter to take an eight-point lead at the main change, including two goals from Marcus Bontempelli.

=== Third quarter ===
The Bulldogs continued their good streak through the first half of the third quarter. Jason Johannisen took an impressive mark next to the goal posts, resulting in a goal to extend the lead for the Bulldogs. Bontempelli slotted his third goal with a snap shot from 35 metres out to extend their lead to 19 points and firming up his Norm Smith Medal chances in the process. However, the momentum shifted again, this time towards the Demons. Fritsch kicked back-to-back goals, and Ben Brown kicked another, bringing them within one point. Melbourne players Angus Brayshaw, Petracca, Tom Sparrow and Clayton Oliver each scored goals, giving Melbourne a four-goal lead at three quarter time, following one the most incredible periods of play in Grand Final history.

=== Final quarter ===
Melbourne ran away with the win, kicking nine goals in the final quarter compared to the Bulldogs' one. Fritsch added multiple goals to bring his tally to six; it was the first time a player had scored six goals or more in a grand final since Adelaide's Darren Jarman's six-goal performance in 1997. Adam Treloar kicked the only Bulldogs goal for the quarter. Tom McDonald kicked a goal after the siren to bring the margin to 74 points, the largest-ever grand final win for Melbourne.

=== Post-match ===
The victory was Melbourne's first VFL/AFL premiership in 57 years, ending the longest active premiership drought of any team in the competition. The television broadcast showed reactions from many interstate Melbourne supporters who were precluded from attending the match due to COVID-19 restrictions, including former Melbourne Coach Neale Daniher, who was seen draping his scarf over a TV in celebration of Melbourne's long-awaited premiership. The Bulldogs statistically led Melbourne with the total number of kicks (207–206), handballs (172–160), and marks (76–68), but the Demons had six more free kicks (19–13); however, the Demons had 15 more inside-50s (64–49), including 13 more marks inside 50 (17–4), and 11 more clearances (44–33). The premiership cup was awarded by Melbourne Hall of Fame member and Melbourne Team of the Century member Garry Lyon. Master of ceremonies Basil Zempilas received criticism for failing to allow Melbourne premiership coach Simon Goodwin to speak after the win.

Due to Optus Stadium's extensive corporate facilities, the AFL generated A$40 million from hosting the AFL Grand Final in Perth.

=== Norm Smith Medal ===
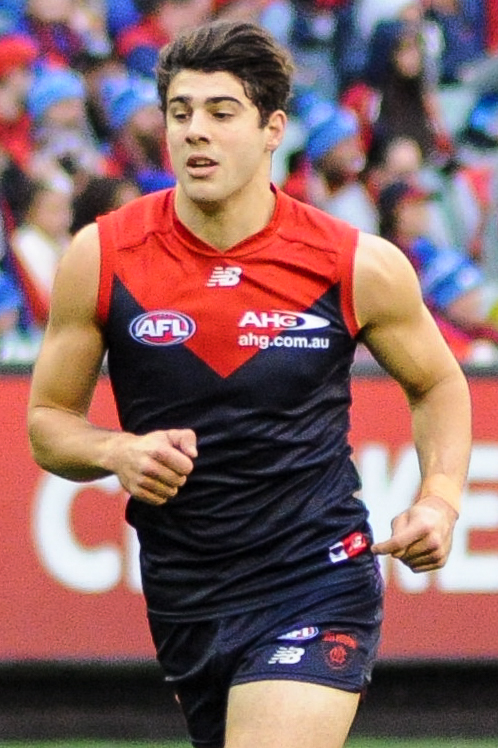
Christian Petracca, Norm Smith Medallist

With a record-equalling grand final possession tally of 39 (shared with Simon Black in 2003)—and despite six goals from Fritsch—Petracca secured the medal after unanimously being judged best afield by an expert panel chaired by Luke Hodge. The possession tally was initially reported as 40, which would have broken the grand final record, but this was revised after the match to 39. Andrew Embley awarded the medal to Petracca; somewhat controversially, however, Zempilas announced the Norm Smith Medal winner before Embley had the chance, receiving further criticism. The votes were as follows:

Norm Smith Medal voting tally
| Position | Player | Club | Total votes | Vote summary |
|---|---|---|---|---|
| 1 (winner) | Christian Petracca | Melbourne | 15 | 3, 3, 3, 3, 3 |
| 2 | Bayley Fritsch | Melbourne | 10 | 2, 2, 2, 2, 2 |
| 3 | Clayton Oliver | Melbourne | 3 | 1, 1, 1 |
| 4 | Christian Salem | Melbourne | 1 | 1 |
| 5 | Caleb Daniel | Western Bulldogs | 1 | 1 |

| Voter | Role | 3 Votes | 2 Votes | 1 Vote |
|---|---|---|---|---|
| Luke Hodge | Channel 7 | Christian Petracca | Bayley Fritsch | Clayton Oliver |
| Harry Taylor | ABC | Christian Petracca | Bayley Fritsch | Christian Salem |
| Tania Armstrong | Triple M | Christian Petracca | Bayley Fritsch | Clayton Oliver |
| Callum Twomey | AFL Media | Christian Petracca | Bayley Fritsch | Caleb Daniel |
| Andrew Krakouer | NIRS | Christian Petracca | Bayley Fritsch | Clayton Oliver |

== Scoreboard ==
Grand final
Saturday, 25 September (5:15 pm) | Melbourne | def. | Western Bulldogs | Optus Stadium (crowd: 61,118) | Report
4.5 (29); 5.9 (39); 12.11 (83); 21.14 (140) | Q1; Q2; Q3; Final | 1.2 (8); 7.5 (47); 9.5 (59); 10.6 (66) | Umpires: Rosebury, Stevic, Mollison; Norm Smith Medal: Christian Petracca; Television broadcast: Seven Network; National anthem: Amy Manford
Fritsch 6 B. Brown 3 Petracca, McDonald 2 Neal-Bullen, Salem, Spargo, Brayshaw, Sparrow, Oliver, Langdon, Jackson 1 | Goals | Bontempelli, Treloar 3 R. Smith, Naughton, Hunter, Johannisen 1
Petracca, Fritsch, Oliver, Brayshaw, Salem, Gawn, Jackson, Langdon, Viney, Neal-Bullen | Best | Bontempelli, Daniel, B. Smith, Treloar, Macrae, Liberatore, Dale
Nil | Injuries | Nil
Nil | Reports | Nil

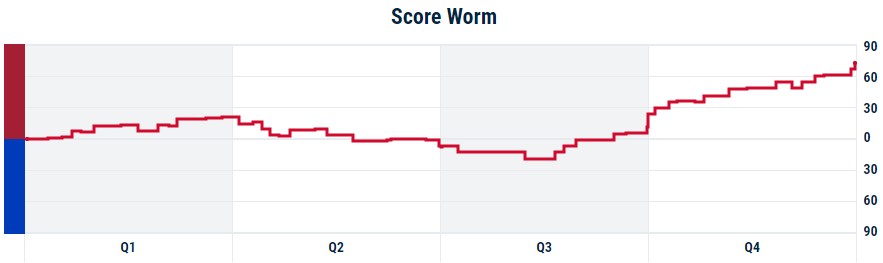
2021 AFL Grand Final score worm

== Media coverage ==
Per the AFL TV rights, the Seven Network had the exclusive broadcast rights within Australia, with Fox Footy showing the replay of the match after the game despite broadcasting its own pre-game, half-time and post-game coverage.

Once streaming services were factored in, the match had an average national viewership of 4.11 million. It is the fourth most-watched VFL/AFL game in history, and it was the most-watched grand final since 2005, which averaged a national audience of 4.449 million.

Due to quarantine requirements for Victorian residents to enter Western Australia, Seven Network commentators James Brayshaw, Brian Taylor and Daisy Pearce, and Fox Footy's Garry Lyon and Kath Loughnan, all quarantined for two weeks in the lead-up to the match. For Taylor, this was his fifth AFL Grand Final he called on commercial television, while for Brayshaw, it was his first, having been promoted to Seven's Friday night AFL commentary team at the beginning of the season when Bruce McAvaney scaled back his duties with the network.

=== Radio coverage ===
| Station | Region | Play-by-play commentators | Special comments | Boundary riders |
|---|---|---|---|---|
| Triple M | National | Mark Howard, Luke Darcy | Jason Dunstall, Wayne Carey, Nathan Brown, Ash Chua (statistician) | Tom Browne |
| ABC Radio | National | Clint Wheeldon, Ben Cameron | Harry Taylor, Sharrod Wellingham, Kara Antonio | Bridget Lacy |
| AFL Nation | National | Dwayne Russell, Andy Maher | Adam Cooney, Nick Dal Santo | N/A |
| NIRS | National | Glenn Mitchell, Jacob Landsmeer | Andrew Krakouer | N/A |
| 3AW | Melbourne, VIC | Tim Lane, Tony Leonard | Leigh Matthews, Jimmy Bartel, Matthew Lloyd | Paddy Sweeney |
| SEN | Melbourne, VIC | Gerard Whateley, Anthony Hudson | Jordan Lewis, Kane Cornes, Gerard Healy | N/A |
| K Rock | Geelong, VIC | Tom King, Ben Casanelia | Mark Neeld | N/A |
| 6PR | Perth, WA | Adam Papalia, Karl Langdon | Will Schofield, Lee Spurr | Mitch Turner |
| Triple M Perth | Perth, WA | Dennis Cometti, Lachy Reid | Andrew Embley, Xavier Ellis, Mark Cometti (statistician) | Tania Armstrong |

== See also ==
- 1954 VFL Grand Final
- 2021 AFL Women's Grand Final
- 2021 AFL Season
