= Steven May =

Australian rules footballer (born 1992)

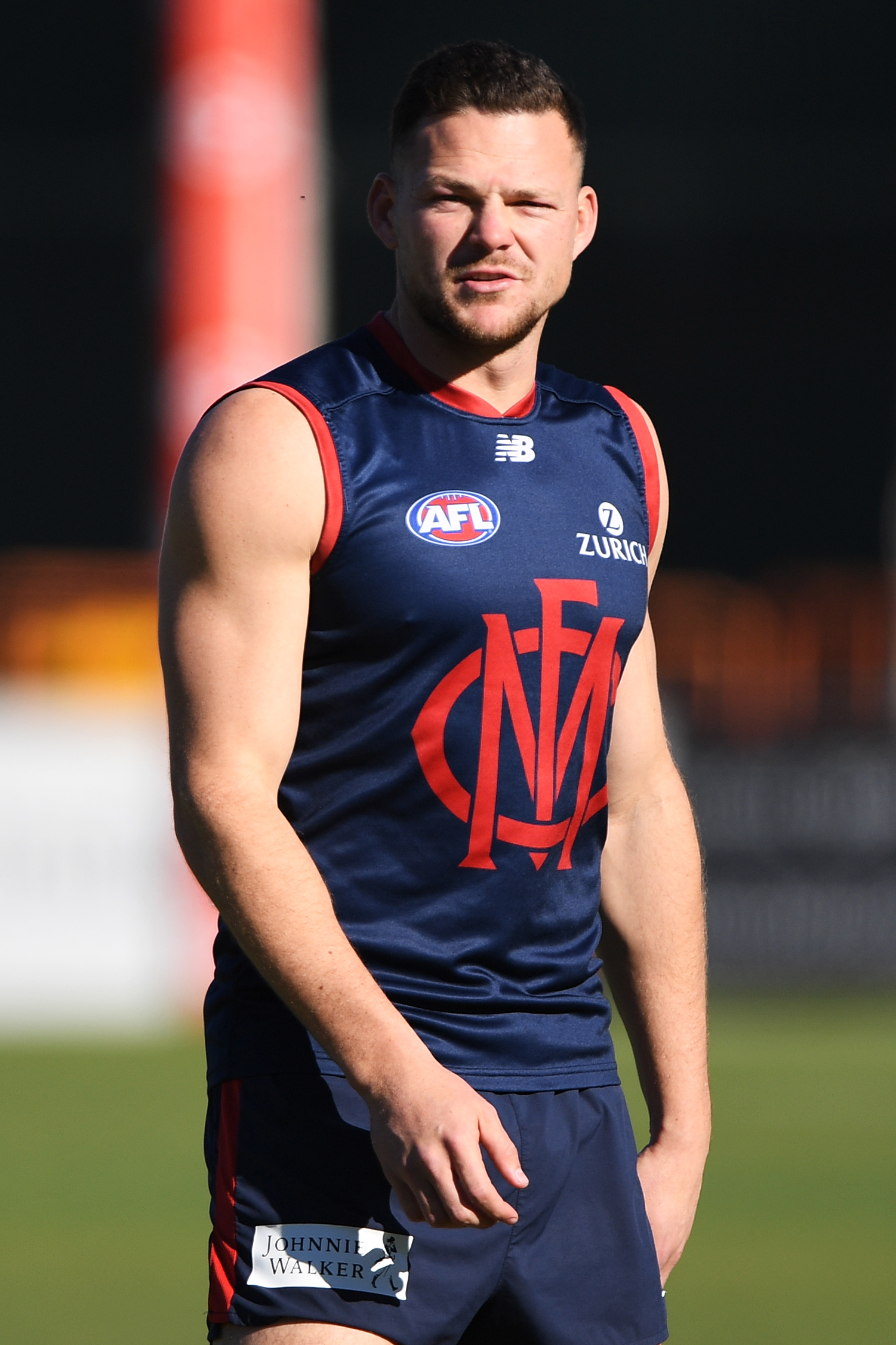
- May with Melbourne in July 2019

Personal information
- Full name: Steven May
- Born: 10 January 1992 (age 34); Darwin, Northern Territory, Australia
- Original team: Southern Districts (NTFL)
- Draft: Priority zone selection, Gold Coast
- Height: 193 cm (6 ft 4 in)
- Weight: 102 kg (225 lb)
- Position: Key defender

Playing career
Years	Club	Games (Goals)
2011–2018	Gold Coast	123 (21)
2019–2025	Melbourne	128 (3)
Total		251 (24)

Representative team honours
Years	Team	Games (Goals)
2013	Indigenous All-Stars	1 (0)

Career highlights
- AFL premiership player: 2021; 2× All-Australian: 2021, 2022; Gold Coast captain: 2017–2018; 22under22 team: 2014

Steven May (born 10 January 1992) is a former Australian rules footballer who played for the Gold Coast Suns and Melbourne Football Club in the Australian Football League (AFL). He served as the co-captain of Gold Coast in the 2017 and 2018 AFL seasons and was a premiership player for Melbourne in the 2021 season.

== Early life and junior football ==
Steven May was born in Darwin into a family of Indigenous Australian descent (Gunbalanya and Larrakia).

May began playing his junior football at Southern Districts Football Club, competing in the Northern Territory Football League. His performances for Southern Districts earned him a scholarship at the AIS in 2008. Later in 2008 he moved to Melbourne to complete his final years of schooling at Melbourne Grammar. A highlight of his while at Melbourne Grammar, was kicking 9 goals against Scotch College. While competing for the Northern Territory at the 2010 AFL Under 18 Championships, he was named at full forward in the under 18 All-Australian team. Following his efforts at the National Championships, the newly formed Gold Coast Football Club signed him as one of their two priority zone selections from the Northern Territory. May would finish the 2010 season for Melbourne Grammar in the Associated Public Schools of Victoria competition with 40 goals from eight games, as well as the best and fairest award. Following graduation, he relocated to the Gold Coast at the end of 2010 to begin his AFL career.

== AFL career ==
May made his AFL debut against Essendon in round six of the 2011 season, playing as a defender. May played nine games in 2011, playing the majority of the time in defence. In 2012, May was again used in defence for the best part of the 2012 AFL season until round 21 against Hawthorn where he had a breakout game, being moved forward for the game. In the game, he kicked three goals, took 12 marks in an impressive display up forward for the Suns.

In a 2014 match against the Sydney Swans, May manned-up on two-time Coleman Medallist Lance Franklin, and did it well, limiting him to only three goals. On 16 April 2016, May knocked out Stefan Martin after leaving his feet to deliver a full-body hit after the ball had gone past the two players. As a result, May was suspended for five matches.

May was named a co-captain of the Gold Coast Football Club in December 2016, making him just the sixth Indigenous captain in VFL/AFL history.

On 24 May 2017, it was announced that he would wear number 67 on his AFL guernsey, rather than his usual 17, for the round 10 Sir Doug Nicholls Indigenous Round game against Melbourne. This was to commemorate the 1967 referendum which allowed Indigenous Australians to be counted with the general population in the census.

During the 2018 AFL trade period, May was traded to Melbourne. Early in his first year at Melbourne, May was impacted by injuries and poor form. However, ever since, his impact and contribution to the Melbourne backline has been outstanding alongside Jake Lever and Adam Tomlinson . By round 7 in 2021, May was averaging 20.2 disposals per match, 16.7 kicks and 6.8 marks. Melbourne remained undefeated and on top of the ladder at that time conceding the fewest points (434) of any team by that point of the season.

May won his first AFL premiership with Melbourne in the 2021 AFL Grand Final, after Melbourne defeated the Western Bulldogs, despite having playing a serious hamstring injury.

In June 2022, May was suspended for one match following a public altercation with teammate Jake Melksham and also drinking alcohol while under the concussion protocols. Sources at Melbourne commented that the drunken scuffle was the result of Melksham's comments on May's drinking habit.

May announced his retirement from the AFL on March 1, 2026 a few days prior to the commencement of the 2026 AFL season.

== Statistics ==
Legend
G	Goals	K	Kicks	D	Disposals	T	Tackles
B	Behinds	H	Handballs	M	Marks
#	Played in that season's premiership team

Season	Team	No.	Games	Totals							Averages (per game)							Votes
Season	Team	No.	Games	G	B	K	H	D	M	T	G	B	K	H	D	M	T	Votes
2011	Gold Coast	45	9	0	1	76	34	110	34	17	0.0	0.1	8.4	3.8	12.2	3.8	1.9	0
2012	Gold Coast	45	8	5	2	64	28	92	41	13	0.6	0.3	8.0	3.5	11.5	5.1	1.6	1
2013	Gold Coast	17	17	10	6	113	59	172	57	26	0.6	0.4	6.6	3.5	10.1	3.4	1.5	0
2014	Gold Coast	17	19	0	1	200	54	254	73	43	0.0	0.1	10.5	2.8	13.4	3.8	2.3	3
2015	Gold Coast	17	18	0	3	171	78	249	76	18	0.0	0.2	9.5	4.3	13.8	4.2	1.0	1
2016	Gold Coast	17	17	2	0	177	104	281	110	32	0.1	0.0	10.4	6.1	16.5	6.5	1.9	5
2017	Gold Coast	17/67	18	1	2	234	113	347	127	24	0.1	0.1	13.0	6.3	19.3	7.1	1.3	2
2018	Gold Coast	17	17	3	3	224	71	295	127	29	0.2	0.2	13.2	4.2	17.4	7.5	1.7	1
2019	Melbourne	1	8	1	2	104	17	121	30	9	0.1	0.3	13.0	2.1	15.1	3.8	1.1	0
2020 (Note: The 2020 season was played with 17 home-and-away matches per team (down from 22) and 16-minute quarters with time on (down from 20-minute quarters with time on) due to the impact of the COVID-19 pandemic.)	Melbourne	1	17	1	0	210	62	272	76	15	0.1	0.0	12.4	3.6	16.0	4.5	0.9	4
2021^{#}	Melbourne	1	23	0	2	339	61	400	125	24	0.0	0.1	14.7	2.7	17.4	5.4	1.0	1
2022 (Note: 2022 statistics include one game in which May was substituted out of the game due to injury (round 11) and was replaced by Luke Dunstan.)	Melbourne	1	22	0	1	350	71	421	111	28	0.0	0.0	15.9	3.2	19.1	5.0	1.3	0
2023	Melbourne	1	23	0	1	321	75	396	125	37	0.0	0.0	14.0	3.3	17.2	5.4	1.6	3
2024	Melbourne	1	19	1	0	295	52	347	132	18	0.1	0.0	15.5	2.7	18.3	6.9	0.9	0
2025	Melbourne	1	16	0	0	229	54	283	113	12	0.0	0.0	14.3	3.4	17.7	7.1	0.8	0
Career			251	24	24	3107	933	4040	1357	345	0.1	0.1	12.4	3.7	16.1	5.4	1.4	21

== Honours and achievements ==
Team

- AFL premiership player (Melbourne): 2021
- McClelland Trophy (Melbourne): 2021

Individual

- 2× All-Australian team: 2021, 2022
- Ron Barassi Snr Memorial Trophy (Melbourne B&F Third Place): 2022
- Sid Anderson Memorial Trophy (Melbourne B&F Runner-Up): 2020
- Gold Coast captain: 2017–2018
- 22under22 team: 2014
- Indigenous All-Stars team: 2013
