= 2021 All-Australian team =

Honorary Australian rules football team

The 2021 All-Australian team represents the best performed Australian Football League (AFL) players during the 2021 season. It was announced on 26 August as a complete Australian rules football team of 22 players. The team is honorary and does not play any games.

== Selection panel ==
The selection panel for the 2021 All-Australian team consisted of chairman Gillon McLachlan, Kevin Bartlett, Jude Bolton, Andrew Dillon, Glen Jakovich, Chris Johnson, Cameron Ling, Matthew Richardson, Nick Riewoldt and Warren Tredrea.

== Team ==
=== Initial squad ===
The initial 40-man All-Australian squad was announced on 21 August. Minor premiers Melbourne had the most players selected in the initial squad with seven, while the Brisbane Lions had five. Collingwood, North Melbourne and Richmond were the only clubs not to have a single player nominated in the squad. Seven players from the 2020 team were among those selected.

| Club | Total | Player(s) |
|---|---|---|
| Adelaide | 2 | Rory Laird, Paul Seedsman |
| Brisbane Lions | 5 | Charlie Cameron, Jarryd Lyons, Hugh McCluggage, Daniel Rich, Dayne Zorko |
| Carlton | 3 | Harry McKay, Sam Walsh, Jacob Weitering |
| Collingwood | 0 | |
| Essendon | 3 | Zach Merrett, Darcy Parish, Jake Stringer |
| Fremantle | 2 | Sean Darcy, David Mundy |
| Geelong | 2 | Tom Hawkins, Tom Stewart |
| Gold Coast | 1 | Touk Miller |
| Greater Western Sydney | 2 | Toby Greene, Jacob Hopper |
| Hawthorn | 1 | Tom Mitchell |
| Melbourne | 7 | Bayley Fritsch, Max Gawn, Jake Lever, Steven May, Clayton Oliver, Christian Petracca, Christian Salem |
| North Melbourne | 0 | |
| Port Adelaide | 3 | Aliir Aliir, Karl Amon, Ollie Wines |
| Richmond | 0 | |
| St Kilda | 1 | Jack Steele |
| Sydney | 4 | Lance Franklin, Callum Mills, Tom Papley, Luke Parker |
| West Coast | 1 | Nic Naitanui |
| Western Bulldogs | 3 | Marcus Bontempelli, Bailey Dale, Jack Macrae |

=== Final team ===
Melbourne had the most selections with five, with twelve clubs represented overall. Melbourne captain Max Gawn was announced as the All-Australian captain, with Western Bulldogs captain Marcus Bontempelli announced as vice-captain. The team saw eleven players selected in an All-Australian team for the first time in their careers, while seven players from the 2020 team were among those selected.

2021 All-Australian team
| B: | Jake Lever (Melbourne) | Steven May (Melbourne) | Tom Stewart (Geelong) |
| HB: | Daniel Rich (Brisbane Lions) | Aliir Aliir (Port Adelaide) | Bailey Dale (Western Bulldogs) |
| C: | Zach Merrett (Essendon) | Ollie Wines (Port Adelaide) | Sam Walsh (Carlton) |
| HF: | Marcus Bontempelli (Western Bulldogs) (vice-captain) | Tom Hawkins (Geelong) | Christian Petracca (Melbourne) |
| F: | Toby Greene (Greater Western Sydney) | Harry McKay (Carlton) | Tom Papley (Sydney) |
| Foll: | Max Gawn (Melbourne) (captain) | Jack Macrae (Western Bulldogs) | Clayton Oliver (Melbourne) |
| Int: | Darcy Parish (Essendon) | Nic Naitanui (West Coast) | Touk Miller (Gold Coast) |
| Int: | Jack Steele (St Kilda) | | |
| Coach: | Simon Goodwin (Melbourne) | | |

Note: the position of coach in the All-Australian team is traditionally awarded to the coach of the premiership team.
