= Ed Langdon =

Australian rules footballer

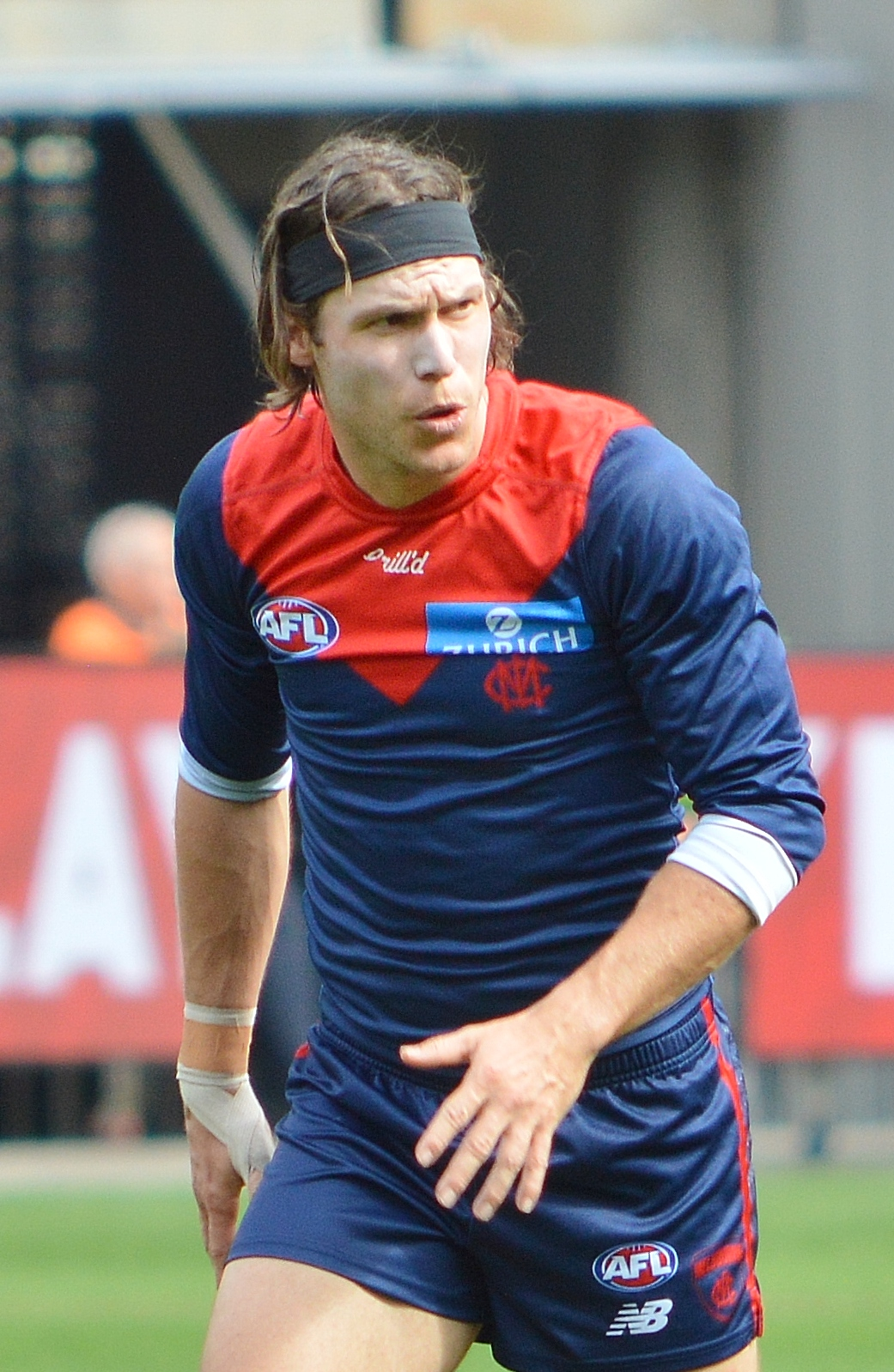
- Langdon with Melbourne in April 2025

Personal information
- Full name: Ed Langdon
- Born: 1 February 1996 (age 30); Melbourne, Victoria
- Original team: Sandringham Dragons (TAC Cup)
- Draft: No. 54, 2014 national draft
- Height: 182 cm (6 ft 0 in)
- Weight: 78 kg (172 lb)
- Position: Winger

Club information
- Current club: Melbourne
- Number: 15

Playing career^{1}
Years	Club	Games (Goals)
2015–2019	Fremantle	68 (33)
2020–	Melbourne	155 (62)
Total		221 (95)
- ^{1} Playing statistics correct to the end of round 22, 2026.

Career highlights
- AFL premiership player: 2021; 22under22 team: 2018; WAFL premiership player: 2016

Ed Langdon (born 1 February 1996) is an Australian rules footballer who currently plays for the Melbourne Football Club in the Australian Football League (AFL).

== Early life ==
Langdon participated in the Auskick program at Glen Iris, Victoria. He played his junior football with the Glen Iris Gladiators and Prahran. He played for Sandringham Dragons in the TAC Cup.

He grew up in the Melbourne suburb of Toorak.

== AFL career ==
Originally recruited by the Fremantle Football Club as the club's 3rd, and the 54th overall draft pick in the 2014 AFL draft, he made his debut in Round 22 of the 2015 AFL season against Melbourne at Domain Stadium, after playing well for Fremantle's reserves team, Peel Thunder, in the West Australian Football League (WAFL). After 5 seasons and 68 games, Langdon was traded to Melbourne at the conclusion of the 2019 season.

== Personal life ==
Langdon's older brother Tom, also played in the AFL for the Collingwood Football Club, before announcing his retirement in November 2020.

== Statistics ==
Updated to the end of round 22, 2026.

Legend
G	Goals	K	Kicks	D	Disposals	T	Tackles
B	Behinds	H	Handballs	M	Marks

Season	Team	No.	Games	Totals							Averages (per game)							Votes
Season	Team	No.	Games	G	B	K	H	D	M	T	G	B	K	H	D	M	T	Votes
2015	Fremantle	26	2	0	2	20	12	32	12	5	0.0	1.0	10.0	6.0	16.0	6.0	2.5	0
2016	Fremantle	26	13	8	5	100	105	205	34	35	0.6	0.4	7.7	8.1	15.8	2.6	2.7	0
2017	Fremantle	26	10	5	3	98	81	179	42	19	0.5	0.3	9.8	8.1	17.9	4.2	1.9	0
2018	Fremantle	26	21	11	11	279	191	470	121	61	0.5	0.5	13.3	9.1	22.4	5.8	2.9	0
2019	Fremantle	26	22	9	10	320	230	550	131	42	0.4	0.5	14.5	10.5	25.0	6.0	1.9	2
2020 (Note: The 2020 season was played with 17 home-and-away matches per team (down from 22) and 16-minute quarters with time on (down from 20-minute quarters with time on) due to the impact of the COVID-19 pandemic.)	Melbourne	15	17	2	8	216	126	342	88	22	0.1	0.5	12.7	7.4	20.1	5.2	1.3	0
2021^{#}	Melbourne	15	24	13	9	315	209	524	130	45	0.5	0.4	13.1	8.7	21.8	5.4	1.9	0
2022 (Note: 2022 statistics include one game in which Langdon was substituted out of the game due to injury (round 10) and was replaced by Toby Bedford.)	Melbourne	15	23	13	7	286	206	492	95	30	0.6	0.3	12.4	9.0	21.4	4.1	1.3	7
2023	Melbourne	15	25	6	10	272	218	490	93	54	0.2	0.4	10.9	8.7	19.6	3.7	2.2	0
2024	Melbourne	15	22	9	10	243	206	449	119	53	0.4	0.5	11.0	9.4	20.4	5.4	2.4	5
2025	Melbourne	15	23	8	6	225	213	438	115	62	0.3	0.3	9.8	9.3	19.0	5.0	2.7	0
2026	Melbourne	15	21	11	9	220	195	415	118	42	0.5	0.4	10.5	9.3	19.8	5.6	2.0	0
Career			223	95	90	2594	1992	4586	1098	470	0.4	0.4	11.6	8.9	20.6	4.9	2.1	14

== Honours and achievements ==
Team

- AFL premiership player (Melbourne): 2021
- McClelland Trophy (Melbourne): 2021
- WAFL premiership player (Peel Thunder): 2016

Individual

- 22under22 team: 2018
- Fremantle Players' Award: 2018
