= Tom Papley =

Australian rules footballer

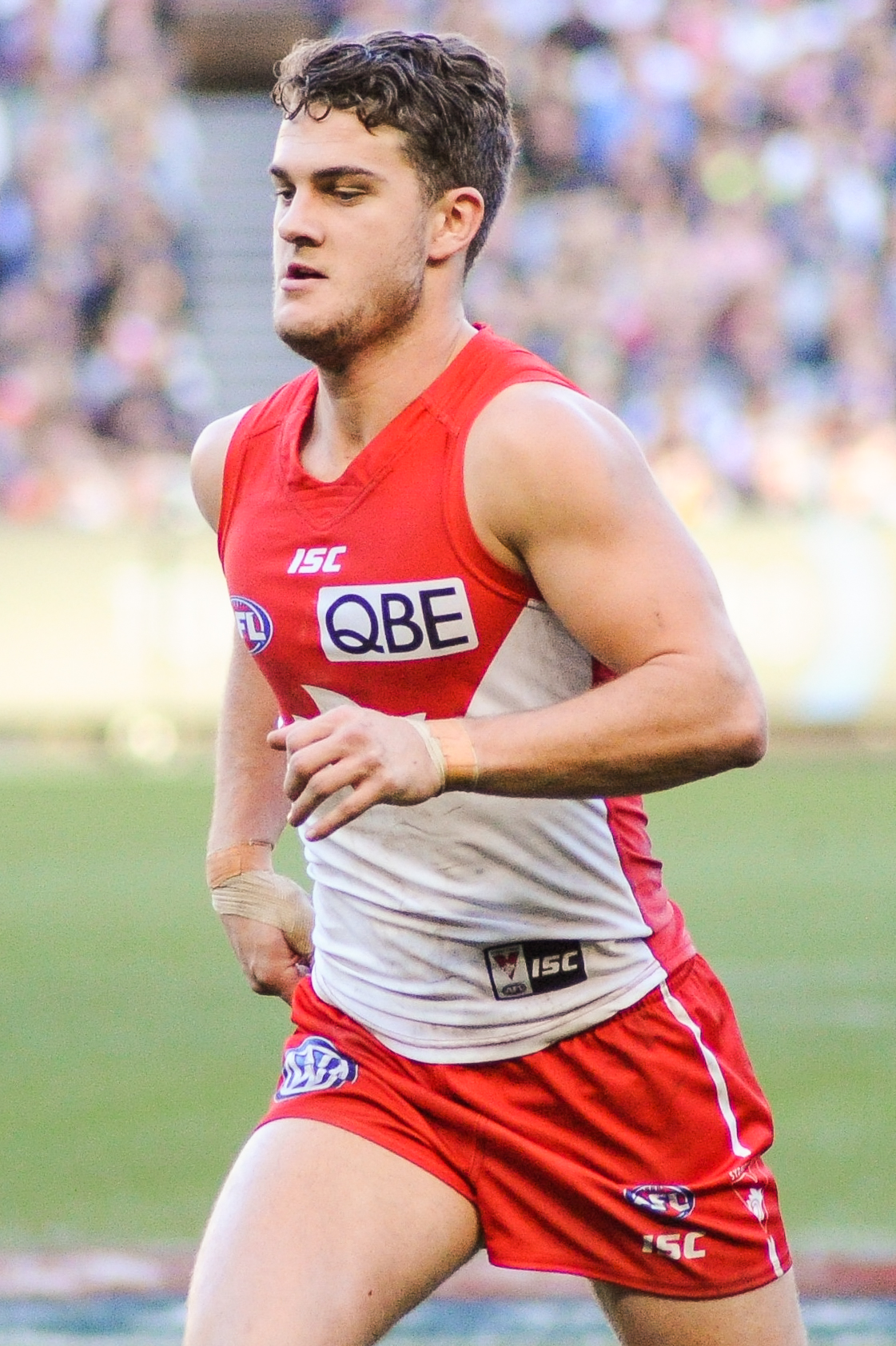
- Papley playing for Sydney in 2017

Personal information
- Full name: Tom Papley
- Nickname: Paps
- Born: 13 July 1996 (age 30); Melbourne, Victoria, Australia
- Original team: Gippsland Power (TAC Cup)/Bunyip
- Draft: 14th selection 2016 Rookie Draft
- Height: 178 cm (5 ft 10 in)
- Weight: 76 kg (168 lb)
- Position: Forward

Club information
- Current club: Sydney
- Number: 11

Playing career^{1}
Years	Club	Games (Goals)
2016–	Sydney	212 (330)

Representative team honours
Years	Team	Games (Goals)
2020	Victoria	1 (5)
- ^{1} Playing statistics correct to the end of round 22, 2026.

Career highlights
- All-Australian: 2021; 3x Sydney leading goalkicker: 2019, 2020, 2023; 22under22 team: 2017; AFL Rising Star nominee: 2016

Tom Papley (born 13 July 1996) is an Australian rules footballer playing for the Sydney Swans in the Australian Football League (AFL). He was drafted with pick 14 in the 2016 rookie draft.

== AFL career ==
Papley made his AFL debut in round 1 of the 2016 AFL season against the Collingwood Football Club, kicking three goals. He earned the Rising Star nomination for round 5 following an impressive display against the West Coast Eagles in which he kicked two goals, earned 20 possessions, had six inside-50s and took eight marks in a match played in wet weather. Arguably his best season was in 2019, impressing many after the absence of Lance Franklin when he tied in 14th for goalkickers, with 37 goals. He kicked 4 goals against North Melbourne and 5 goals against the West Coast Eagles, proving to be two of his best performances. But throughout the year, Papley had a desire to return home back to Victoria despite being contracted to the Swans until 2023 and was heavily linked to both Carlton and North Melbourne. During the trade period, he requested a trade to Carlton, but Papley wasn't given his wish as the trade didn't go through. Papley was selected to play for Victoria in the State of Origin Bushfire Relief game, where he kicked 5 goals.

Papley played all 17 games of the 2020 AFL season, kicking 26 goals and leading the Swans' goalkicking tally for the second year in a row. His standout performance came against Hawthorn in Round 8, kicking 4 goals and sparking Sydney to a 7-point victory.

Papley rose to new heights in the 2021 AFL season, with a career-high 41 goals. This included four-goal performances against Richmond, GWS and Essendon, and the match-winning goal against Geelong in round 7. Papley was rewarded with his first ever All-Australian jumper in the 2021 All-Australian team, confirming his status as one of the competition's premier small forwards.

Papley missed the first six rounds of the 2022 season due to a preseason hamstring injury he suffered in a practice match with GWS. Despite the late start to the season he was awarded with being a member of the All-Australian Squad in 2022.

In round four, 2026, Papley played his 200th AFL game against the West Coast Eagles at Optus Stadium, with the Sydney Swans winning by 128 points to record their largest victory in an away premiership match.

== Personal life ==
Papley has a gambling related podcast called The Early Crow.

Papley grew up in Bunyip and attended Marist Sion College in Warragul. He left school after year 11 to take up a plumbing apprenticeship.

== Family ==
His grandfathers, Jeff Bray and Max Papley, were teammates with the South Melbourne Swans from 1964 to 1966, before the team's move to Sydney. Tom Papley wore number 41 for his first two seasons, but following the retirement of Jeremy Laidler after the 2017 season Papley was able to take on number 11, the number Max Papley wore for 45 of his 59 matches with the South Melbourne Swans.

Two of Papley's cousins, Ben Ross and Michael Ross, have also recently played in the AFL.

== Statistics ==
Updated to the end of round 22, 2026.

Legend
G	Goals	K	Kicks	D	Disposals	T	Tackles
B	Behinds	H	Handballs	M	Marks

Season	Team	No.	Games	Totals							Averages (per game)							Votes
Season	Team	No.	Games	G	B	K	H	D	M	T	G	B	K	H	D	M	T	Votes
2016	Sydney	41	20	29	15	141	102	243	57	72	1.5	0.8	7.1	5.1	12.2	2.9	3.6	0
2017	Sydney	41	20	30	19	193	119	312	67	86	1.5	1.0	9.7	6.0	15.6	3.4	4.3	0
2018	Sydney	11	20	24	23	169	104	273	65	58	1.2	1.2	8.5	5.2	13.7	3.3	2.9	0
2019	Sydney	11	22	37	28	241	99	340	106	62	1.7	1.3	11.0	4.5	15.5	4.8	2.8	4
2020 (Note: The 2020 season was played with 17 home-and-away matches per team (down from 22) and 16-minute quarters with time on (down from 20-minute quarters with time on) due to the impact of the COVID-19 pandemic.)	Sydney	11	17	26	27^{†}	149	52	201	57	29	1.5	1.6	8.8	3.1	11.8	3.4	1.7	6
2021	Sydney	11	23	43	27	230	83	313	89	34	1.9	1.2	10.0	3.6	13.6	3.9	1.5	4
2022	Sydney	11	19	32	26	203	87	290	79	37	1.7	1.4	10.7	4.6	15.3	4.2	1.9	5
2023	Sydney	11	23	37	24	254	90	344	74	42	1.6	1.0	11.0	3.9	15.0	3.2	1.8	4
2024	Sydney	11	21	36	30	225	87	312	79	26	1.7	1.4	10.7	4.1	14.9	3.8	1.2	8
2025	Sydney	11	11	10	11	112	53	165	43	18	0.9	1.0	10.2	4.8	15.0	3.9	1.6	0
2026	Sydney	11	16	26	23	159	86	245	47	38	1.6	1.4	9.9	5.4	15.3	2.9	2.4	0
Career			212	330	253	2076	962	3038	763	502	1.6	1.2	9.8	4.5	14.3	3.6	2.4	31

== Honours and achievements ==
Team

- 2x Minor Premiership (Sydney): 2016, 2024
- 2x McClelland Trophy (Sydney): 2016, 2026

Individual

- All-Australian team: 2021
- 2× Sydney leading goalkicker: 2019, 2020
- Victoria representative honours in State of Origin for Bushfire Relief Match: 2020
- 22under22 team: 2017
- AFL Rising Star nominee: 2016 (round 5)
