= Amy Manford =

Australian musical theatre singer

- Born: 25 December 1993 (age 32); Perth, Western Australia
- Genre: musical theatre
- Occupations: Singer (soprano); theatre actor
- Education: Masters of Vocal Performance (Hons.), Royal College of Music

Amy Manford (born 25 December 1993) is an Australian soprano and stage actress. Manford graduated with honours from the Royal College of Music, studying for a Masters in Vocal Performance. She has performed in a number of theatre productions and events around Australia and the globe.

== Career ==
Some of Manford's career highlights include performing alongside Andrea Bocelli for his Australian tours in 2022 and 2025, starring in Andrew Lloyd Webber's The Phantom of the Opera, singing the Australian national anthem for the 2021 AFL Grand Final in Perth, and singing for members of the British royal family on multiple occasions.
