= Tom Sparrow (Australian footballer) =

Australian rules footballer

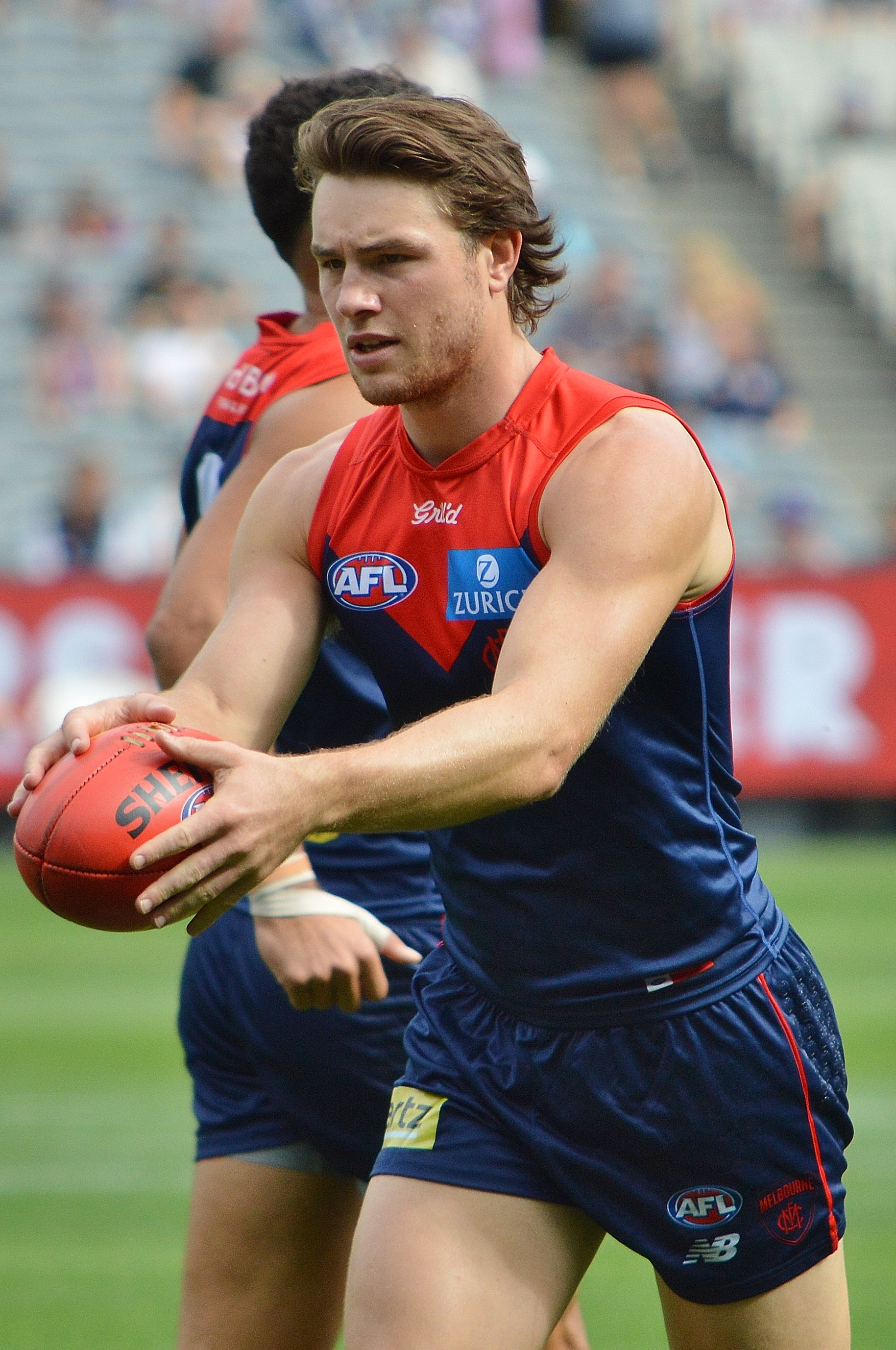
- Sparrow in April 2025

Personal information
- Full name: Thomas Frank Sparrow
- Born: 31 May 2000 (age 26)
- Original team: South Adelaide (SANFL)
- Draft: No. 27, 2018 national draft
- Debut: Round 1, 2019, Melbourne vs. Port Adelaide, at MCG
- Height: 183 cm (6 ft 0 in)
- Weight: 84 kg (185 lb)
- Position: Forward

Club information
- Current club: Melbourne
- Number: 32

Playing career^{1}
Years	Club	Games (Goals)
2019–	Melbourne	139 (56)
- ^{1} Playing statistics correct to the end of round 23, 2026.

Career highlights
- AFL premiership player: 2021

Thomas Frank Sparrow (born 31 May 2000) is a professional Australian rules footballer playing for the Melbourne Football Club in the Australian Football League (AFL). Growing up in the Adelaide Hills, Sparrow began his footballing career at Bridgewater Football Club. He was drafted by Melbourne with their first selection and twenty-seventh overall in the 2018 national draft He made his debut in the twenty-six point loss to Port Adelaide at the Melbourne Cricket Ground in the opening round of the 2019 season as a late inclusion replacing injured teammate Jordan Lewis. On 17 March 2022 Sparrow signed a two-year contract extension with Melbourne.

== Statistics ==
Updated to the end of round 22, 2026.

Legend
G	Goals	K	Kicks	D	Disposals	T	Tackles
B	Behinds	H	Handballs	M	Marks

Season	Team	No.	Games	Totals							Averages (per game)							Votes
Season	Team	No.	Games	G	B	K	H	D	M	T	G	B	K	H	D	M	T	Votes
2019	Melbourne	32	2	1	2	17	5	22	2	8	0.5	1.0	8.5	2.5	11.0	1.0	4.0	0
2020 (Note: The 2020 season was played with 17 home-and-away matches per team (down from 22) and 16-minute quarters with time on (down from 20-minute quarters with time on) due to the impact of the COVID-19 pandemic.)	Melbourne	32	5	2	1	26	30	56	10	13	0.4	0.2	5.2	6.0	11.2	2.0	2.6	0
2021^{#}	Melbourne	32	21	7	4	102	84	186	40	57	0.3	0.2	4.9	4.0	8.9	1.9	2.7	0
2022	Melbourne	32	23	7	8	189	182	371	69	78	0.3	0.3	8.2	7.9	16.1	3.0	3.4	0
2023	Melbourne	32	23	11	8	213	182	395	70	81	0.5	0.3	9.3	7.9	17.2	3.0	3.5	0
2024	Melbourne	32	21	6	7	193	120	313	74	76	0.3	0.3	9.2	5.7	14.9	3.5	3.6	0
2025	Melbourne	32	22	10	8	167	120	287	77	88	0.5	0.4	7.6	5.5	13.0	3.5	4.0	0
2026	Melbourne	32	21	11	11	276	204	480	60	134	0.5	0.5	13.1	9.7	22.9	2.9	6.4	0
Career			138	55	49	1183	927	2110	402	535	0.4	0.4	8.6	6.7	15.3	2.9	3.9	0

== Honours and achievements ==
Team

- AFL premiership player (Melbourne): 2021
- McClelland Trophy (Melbourne): 2021
