= Jake Lever =

Australian rules footballer (born 1996)

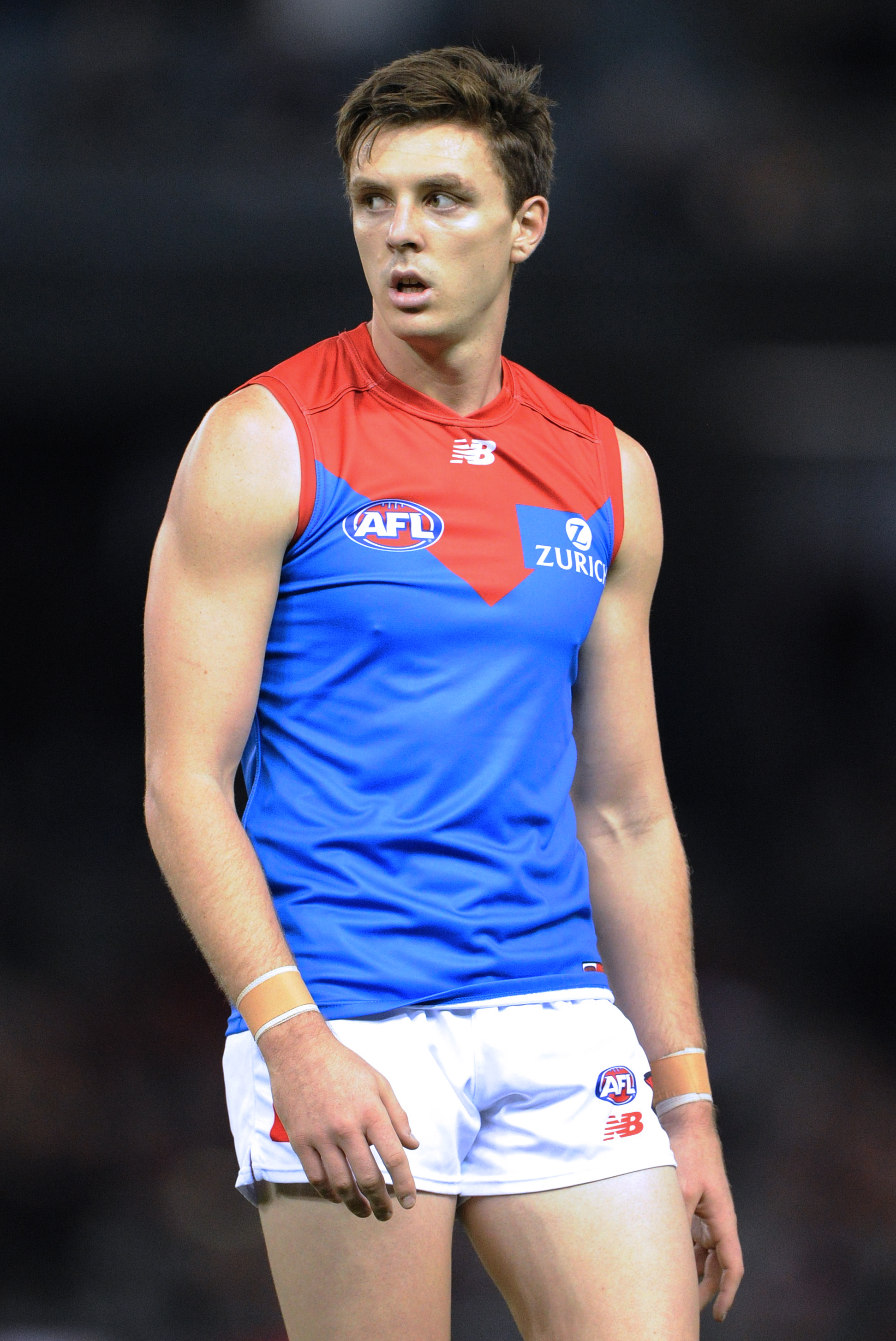
- Lever playing for Melbourne in April 2018

Personal information
- Full name: Jake Lever
- Born: 5 March 1996 (age 30)
- Original teams: Romsey (RDFL); Calder Cannons (TAC Cup)
- Draft: No. 14, 2014 national draft
- Debut: Round 6, 2015, Adelaide vs. Gold Coast, at Metricon Stadium
- Height: 195 cm (6 ft 5 in)
- Weight: 89 kg (196 lb)
- Position: Key defender

Club information
- Current club: Melbourne
- Number: 8

Playing career^{1}
Years	Club	Games (Goals)
2015–2017	Adelaide	56 (3)
2018–	Melbourne	150 (2)
Total		204 (5)
- ^{1} Playing statistics correct to the end of round 22, 2026.

Career highlights
- AFL premiership player: 2021; All-Australian: 2021; 3× 22under22 team: 2015, 2016, 2017; AFL Rising Star nominee: 2015

Jake Lever (born 5 March 1996) is a professional Australian rules footballer playing for the Melbourne Football Club in the Australian Football League (AFL). A defender, 1.95 metres (6 ft 5 in) tall and weighing 89 kilograms (196 lb), Lever plays primarily as a half-back and is known for his intercept marking and ability to read the play. Originally from Romsey, Victoria, he played top-level football at a young age when he played with the Calder Cannons in the TAC Cup, and represented and captained Victoria in the AFL Under 18 Championships as a bottom-aged player. He suffered a serious knee injury which forced him to miss the entire season in his final junior year.

Despite being one of the top prospects heading into the 2014 AFL draft, he slipped through to pick fourteen and was recruited by the Adelaide Football Club. He made his debut during the 2015 season and received an AFL Rising Star nomination. He spent three seasons at Adelaide, in which he played in a grand final, was named in the All-Australian squad, named in the 22under22 team three times, and won the emerging talent award at Adelaide. After fifty-six matches with Adelaide, he joined the Melbourne Football Club during the 2017 trade period.

== Early life ==
Lever was born to Alan and Narelle Lever on 5 March 1996 and was raised in Romsey, Victoria. He started his junior football career with the Romsey-Lancefield Rangers in the Riddell District Junior Football League at eight years of age. After playing as a midfielder and forward throughout his junior career, he played full-back in the 2011 Under 15 Victorian Championships and played in the back-line again the next year in the Under-16 National Championships for Victoria Metro despite kicking thirty-three goals in three weeks in the Romsey under-16s; in the same season, he captained the Calder Cannons at under 16 level. He played senior football with the Romsey Football Club in the Riddell District Football League at sixteen years of age and played in the grand final in 2012.

In late 2012, Lever received a scholarship with the Australian Institute of Sport (AIS) when he was named in the AIS/AFL Academy level one squad as part of their 2013 intake. He played for the Calder Cannons in the TAC Cup as a bottom-aged player in 2013. He played fourteen matches for the season, including the preliminary final loss to the Dandenong Stingrays, and finished third in the best and fairest count. He averaged eighteen disposals, five rebound 50s and three intercept marks for the season. He received mid-year honours when he represented Vic Metro in the 2013 AFL Under 18 Championships, playing in four matches and captaining one of the matches despite being a bottom-aged player.

For the second consecutive year, Lever was a part of the AIS/AFL Academy when he was named in the level two squad as part of the 2014 intake. In November 2013, as part of academy training, he jarred his knee which scans later revealed he had torn his anterior cruciate ligament (ACL). He spent the 2014 season in the coaches box with the Calder Cannons and Vic Metro, a move which he later described was motivated by wanting to coach after finishing his playing career. Despite missing the entire season due to the knee injury, he was still being touted as a top ten draft pick and was described by AFL Media journalist, Callum Twomey, as a "competitive and aggressive tall defender who can shut down opponents while also providing good rebound...his leadership is excellent as is his work rate and feel for the game." In addition to football, Lever was an avid boxer and was nearly chosen to compete in the 2012 London Olympics. He started the sport in year seven to stay fit during the football off-season and had planned to participate in amateur fights during 2014, but was unable to due to his knee injury.

== AFL career ==
=== 2015–2016: Early career ===
Heading into the 2014 national draft, Lever was linked to the Melbourne Football Club and was predicted to be selected as high as Melbourne's pick two or three, however, he slipped through to the Adelaide Football Club's first selection and fourteenth overall in the draft. After the coaching staff elected to take a cautions approach with Lever and not play him in the 2015 NAB Challenge, he played his first match in over eighteen months when he played in a South Australian National Football League (SANFL) trial match against West Adelaide in early April. He made his SANFL debut in Adelaide's first match of the year in the three point loss to North Adelaide at Prospect Oval in round two and was named in Adelaide's best players. After playing in a handful of matches in the SANFL, his form was publicly praised by then-Adelaide coach, Phil Walsh, and he was named to make his AFL debut in round six against Gold Coast at Metricon Stadium. He recorded seventeen disposals at eighty-eight percent efficiency, ten marks and three tackles.

In his fourth match, he recorded seventeen disposals and five marks in the eleven point loss to Fremantle at the Adelaide Oval in round nine and was named in the AFL Media's team of the week. In the same match, he injured his ankle which saw him miss three weeks of football before returning through the SANFL. He returned to the senior side for the round fifteen match against West Coast at Domain Stadium. Two weeks later in his seventh AFL match, he was named the round nominee for the AFL Rising Star after recording twenty-four disposals at ninety-two percent efficiency, ten marks and seven rebound-50s in the forty-five point win against Gold Coast at Adelaide Oval in round seventeen. He was highly praised for his performance in the match by Adelaide's caretaker coach, Scott Camporeale, who said "he's a great competitor...he's going to be a 200-game player of this footy club and a real leader."

He played the remainder of the home and away season apart from the round twenty-one match against Brisbane at the Adelaide Oval due to being rested. Despite the club qualifying for finals, he was omitted for the finals campaign and played twelve matches in total for the season. His season was commended by his coaches due to his maturity and professional approach and he received the Dr Brian Sando OAM Trophy, in addition to Adelaide's defensive coach, Darren Milburn, stating Lever could become one of the AFL's elite defenders. He was recognised as one of the top young players in the competition when he finished fourth in AFL Players Association (AFLPA) best first year player award, eighth in the AFL Rising Star award and was named as the centre half-back in the 22under22 team.

Lever's second season saw him play every match for the year averaging sixteen disposals and five marks from twenty-four matches, in addition to finishing sixth in the league for intercept possessions with 176. His continual growth in defence drew public approval from the media including The Advertiser's journalists, Scott Walsh and Reece Romfray, with the former highlighting his "ability to read, and squash, opposition entries to the forward 50" and the latter stating he was the "captain in waiting" for Adelaide. He was commended for his performance in the fifty-eight point win against Port Adelaide in round two by former Port Adelaide player, Kane Cornes, who labelled the match his break out game, in which he recorded nineteen disposals, ten marks and six rebound 50s. He earned AFL Media team of the week honours for the sixty point win against Carlton at the Melbourne Cricket Ground in round sixteen.

Lever kicked the first goal of his career late in the season in the round twenty-one match against Fremantle at Domain Stadium, playing on from a mark and baulking two Fremantle defenders before kicking the goal, his effort was nominated as the goal of the round. After being omitted from the finals during his first season, he played his first finals match in the elimination final against North Melbourne at Adelaide Oval; the club won the match, but went on to lose to Sydney in the semi-final at the Sydney Cricket Ground. His season was rewarded with selection in the 22under22 team for the second consecutive season as the centre half-back and the "20in2020" team, a team comprising the best twenty players drafted from the previous four AFL Academy intakes. He finished third in the AFL Coaches Association best young player award and won the emerging talent award at Adelaide.

=== 2017–present: Contract speculation and move to Melbourne ===
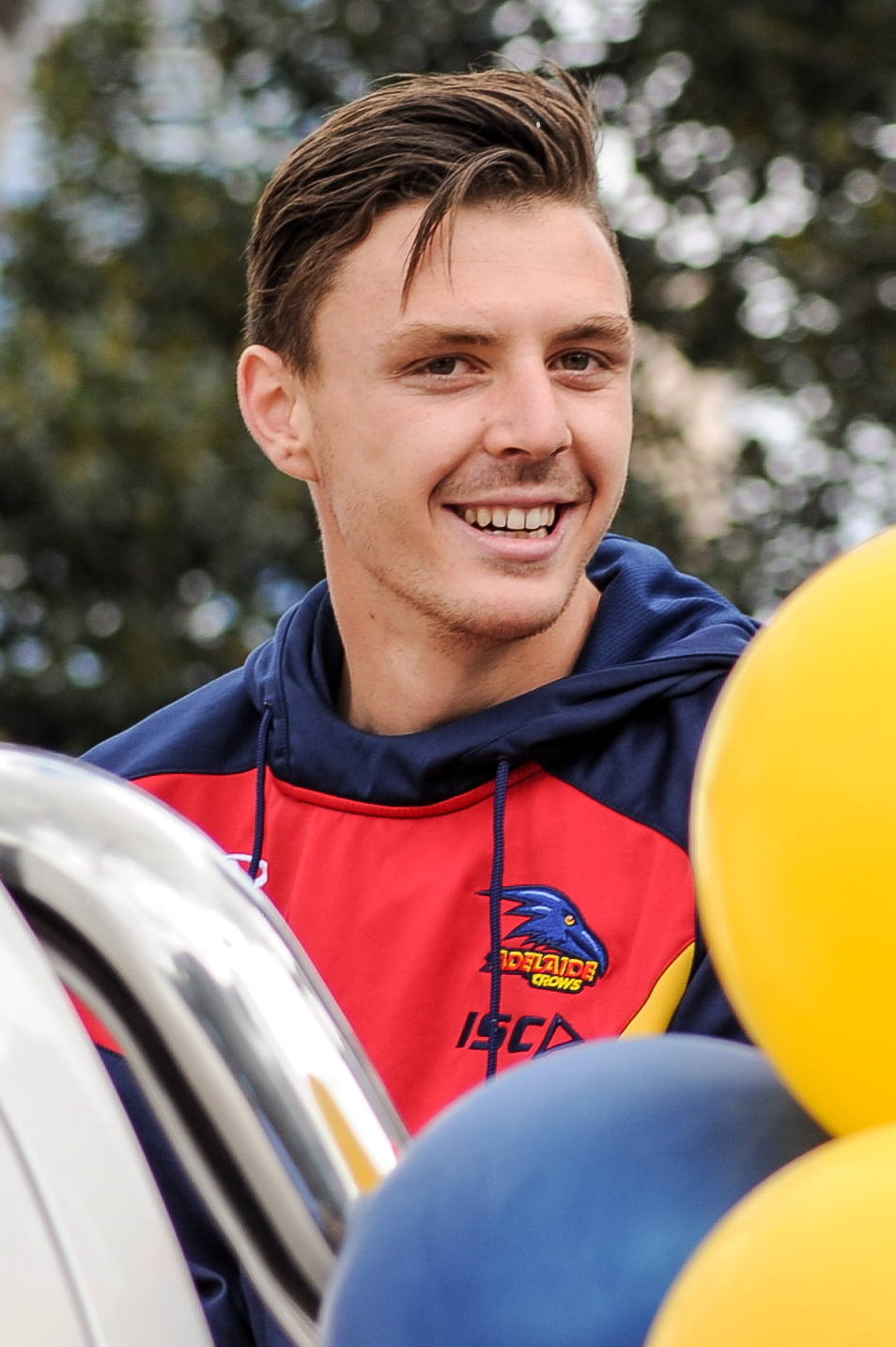
Lever in the AFL Grand Final parade in September 2017

Entering the 2017 season, Lever was predicted to be Adelaide's greatest emerging talent by Fox Sports Australia journalist, Riley Beveridge, however, after sustaining a hamstring injury during the pre-season, he played his first match of the year in a SANFL trial match during the same weekend as the opening round of the AFL season. He returned to the AFL for the seventeen point win against Port Adelaide at the Adelaide Oval in round three. He played the next four matches before missing the round eight match against Melbourne at the Adelaide Oval due to a hamstring injury and returned the next week for the eighty point win against Brisbane at the Gabba. He suffered his third hamstring injury for the season during the round seventeen match against Melbourne at TIO Stadium and consequently missed the next two matches. He returned for the eighty-four point win against Post Adelaide in round twenty in which was his fiftieth AFL match.

He played every match for the remainder of the year helping Adelaide win the minor premiership and reach the club's first grand final since 1998 with Adelaide losing the match to Richmond by forty-eight points. Playing twenty matches in total, his season was rewarded with selection in the initial forty man All-Australian squad and he was named the centre half-back in the 22under22 team for the third consecutive season. Labelled the best young key defender in the league by former Melbourne captain, Garry Lyon, Lever was named the next Alex Rance—a four time All-Australian defender—by Riley Beveridge, due to his intercept marking and ability to read the play. Furthermore, he ranked first in the league for intercept possessions with 9.5 per match and second for intercept marks with 3.6 per match.

After entering the 2017 season out of contract, much of the season was spent speculating about whether he would stay at Adelaide or return to Victoria at the end of the season with the speculation beginning in January with an article in The Advertiser by Warren Partland. Lever indicated early in the season he planned on signing another contract with Adelaide, but was waiting until the collective bargaining agreement was finalised between the AFL and AFLPA. The speculation surrounding his contract peaked in August when he terminated his weekly segment with radio station, FIVEaa; although he cited "distractions" as the reason and wanting to focus on finals, Mark Bickley, a co-host of the show offered an alternative reason by suggesting he may have already made his decision to leave Adelaide. In addition, he publicly declared he was putting off contract negotiations until the end of the season. With his strong form during the season, journalists stated that his price tag would continue to rise and Victorian clubs, Collingwood, Melbourne and the Western Bulldogs, publicly announced their interest in signing him.

Three days after the grand final, Lever announced on Seven News Melbourne he had requested a trade to the Melbourne Football Club. The announcement drew major backlash with the perception that he had made his decision to leave Adelaide before the grand final; former Adelaide coach, Graham Cornes, stated he would have left Lever out of the grand final side and The Advertiser journalist, Michelangelo Rucci, reported senior Adelaide players wanted him dropped for the grand final. Furthermore, he did not attend Adelaide's best and fairest night with Lever's manager saying he was advised not to attend by Adelaide, while the wife of Adelaide's Chief Executive Officer retorted by stating Lever chose not to attend the night. He was officially traded to Melbourne during the trade period.

== Statistics ==
Updated to the end of round 22, 2026.

Legend
G	Goals	K	Kicks	D	Disposals	T	Tackles
B	Behinds	H	Handballs	M	Marks
#	Played in that season's premiership team

Season	Team	No.	Games	Totals							Averages (per game)							Votes
Season	Team	No.	Games	G	B	K	H	D	M	T	G	B	K	H	D	M	T	Votes
2015	Adelaide	6	12	0	0	108	56	164	60	14	0.0	0.0	9.0	4.7	13.7	5.0	1.2	0
2016	Adelaide	6	24	2	3	248	130	378	124	24	0.1	0.1	10.3	5.4	15.8	5.2	1.0	0
2017	Adelaide	6	20	1	1	208	112	320	125	35	0.1	0.1	10.4	5.6	16.0	6.3	1.8	1
2018	Melbourne	8	11	0	0	114	45	159	54	18	0.0	0.0	10.4	4.1	14.5	4.9	1.6	1
2019	Melbourne	8	8	0	0	77	40	117	55	3	0.0	0.0	9.6	5.0	14.6	6.9	0.4	0
2020 (Note: The 2020 season was played with 17 home-and-away matches per team (down from 22) and 16-minute quarters with time on (down from 20-minute quarters with time on) due to the impact of the COVID-19 pandemic.)	Melbourne	8	17	0	0	121	57	178	75	26	0.0	0.0	7.1	3.4	10.5	4.4	1.5	0
2021^{#}	Melbourne	8	25	0	1	242	147	389	136	44	0.0	0.0	9.7	5.9	15.6	5.4	1.8	5
2022	Melbourne	8	19	1	0	136	90	226	88	32	0.1	0.0	7.2	4.7	11.9	4.6	1.7	1
2023	Melbourne	8	24	0	0	194	145	339	129	25	0.0	0.0	8.1	6.0	14.1	5.4	1.0	0
2024	Melbourne	8	18	1	0	159	84	243	107	23	0.1	0.0	8.8	4.7	13.5	5.9	1.3	0
2025	Melbourne	8	8	0	0	54	42	96	45	13	0.0	0.0	6.8	5.3	12.0	5.6	1.6	0
2026	Melbourne	8	20	0	0	207	90	297	138	29	0.0	0.0	10.4	4.5	14.9	6.9	1.5	0
Career			206	5	5	1868	1038	2906	1136	286	0.0	0.0	9.1	5.0	14.1	5.5	1.4	8

== Honours and achievements ==
Team

- AFL premiership player (Melbourne): 2021
- McClelland Trophy (Adelaide): 2017, (Melbourne): 2021

Individual

- All-Australian team: 2021
- 22under22 team: 2015, 2016, 2017
- Mark Bickley Emerging Talent Award: 2016
- AFL Rising Star nominee: 2015 (Round 17)
