= Bailey Dale =

Australian rules footballer

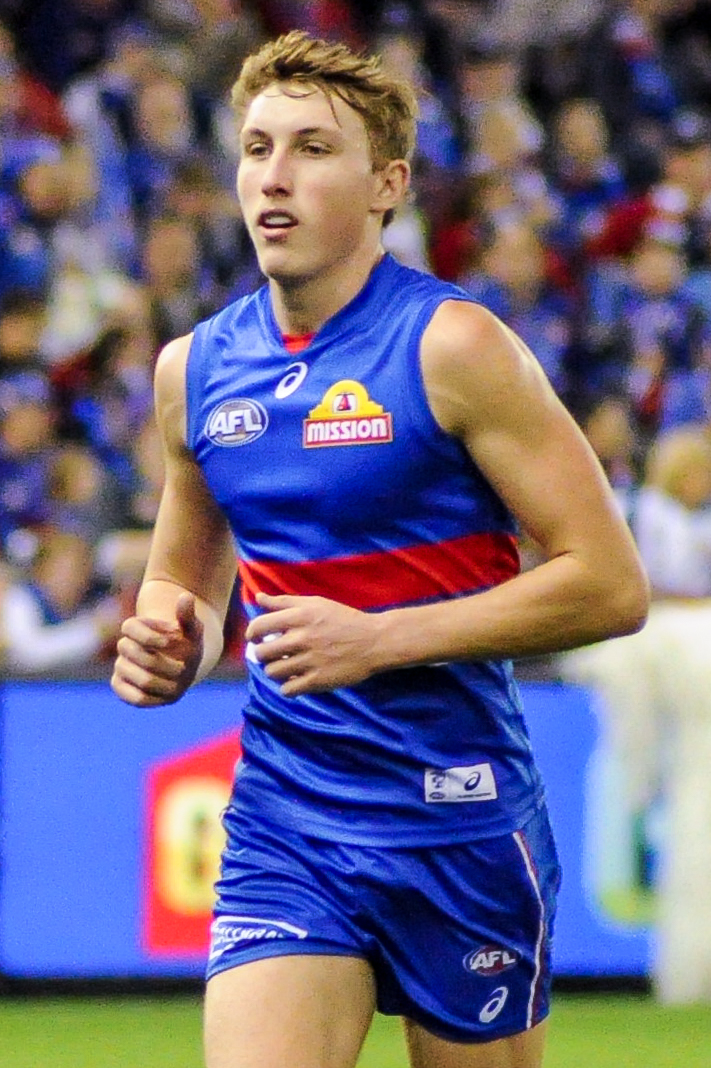
- Dale playing for the Western Bulldogs in June 2017

Personal information
- Born: 22 July 1996 (age 30)
- Original team: Dandenong Stingrays
- Draft: No. 45, 2014 National Draft, Western Bulldogs
- Height: 188 cm (6 ft 2 in)
- Weight: 83 kg (183 lb)
- Position: Defender

Club information
- Current club: Western Bulldogs
- Number: 31

Playing career^{1}
Years	Club	Games (Goals)
2015–	Western Bulldogs	195 (89)
- ^{1} Playing statistics correct to the end of round 22, 2026.

Career highlights
- 2x All-Australian team: 2021, 2025; VFL premiership player: 2016

Bailey Dale (born 22 July 1996) is a professional Australian rules footballer who plays for the Western Bulldogs in the Australian Football League (AFL). At 187 cm (6 ft 2 in) tall and 83 kg (183 lb), he plays as a running half-back who can move up forward or play as a wingman. He grew up in Chelsea Heights, Victoria. He played top-level junior football with the Dandenong Stingrays in the TAC Cup, and placed third in the team's best and fairest.

The Western Bulldogs took Dale with the 45th selection in the 2014 AFL draft. Since then, he has been an All-Australian, a VFL premiership player, and a winner of the Tony Liberatore Most Improved Player Award. He has polled a total of 27 Brownlow Medal votes in his career.

== Early life and career ==
Dale grew up in Chelsea Heights in the southern suburbs of Melbourne. He grew up supporting Collingwood in the Australian Football League, and cited his all-time favourite AFL player as Chris Judd. Dale began his footballing at the Edithvale-Aspendale junior football club. At just a young age, he played in the Victorian Under 12 schoolboys team. Later, he played in the senior's premiership for the Edithvale-Aspendale Eagles at the age of just 17, kicking a goal to help them get over the line. Dale missed bottom age selection with the Dandenong Stingrays in his under 14s and 15s years, however in 2014 he was selected for the under 18 team, where he finished third in the team's best and fairest. He had one of his best games for the Stingrays in round 8 of the 2014 TAC Cup season, kicking three goals and being named as the team's best. He was also named in the team's best in rounds 6, 10 and 13. After kicking 12 goals in the home-and-away season, Dale kicked two more goals in the Stringrays' finals series, which saw them reach a preliminary final against the Calder Cannons. At the AFL Draft Combine, Dale was noted for his goal-kicking accuracy, scoring 24/30 on the goal-kicking test. Despite being predicted not to be drafted by the majority of phantom drafts, Dale was taken by the Western Bulldogs with pick 45 in the third round of the 2014 AFL draft.

== AFL career ==
=== 2015–2017: Early years ===
Dale began his first season with the Bulldogs in the Victorian Football League, playing the first six rounds with Footscray. He played the majority of the season across the wing and half-forward. He made his AFL debut in round 7 of the 2015 AFL season, where he kicked a goal and had 12 disposals. He stayed in the team for five more rounds, but was eventually omitted from the team after round 13. He had his best game for the season in round 17, kicking a crucial goal and collecting a season-high 14 disposals in the team's victory over Collingwood. At the conclusion of the season, Dale signed a two-year contract extension, keeping him tied to the club until the end of the 2017 season.

The 2016 AFL season saw Dale appear only four times in the senior side, and although he missed out on the senior team's "fairytale" 2016 AFL Grand Final, he still tasted premiership success, as he played in Footscray's winning VFL premiership side. In the pre-season, he gained 8 kilograms (18 lb) to improve his frame. He had a good start to the year, kicking seven goals in a brutal pre-season VFL match which saw Footscray win by 131 points. As a result of this performance, he came back into the senior side in round 5 to face Brisbane Lions after missing the first four rounds of the AFL season. and contributed 16 disposals and two behinds in the team's win. However, Dale would struggle to maintain his spot in the senior side, playing just 3 more games in the AFL team for the rest of the season. Following his omission from the team after Round 8, he became a vital member of the Footscray VFL team, kicking 20 goals from 17 games and coming second in Footscray's goal-scoring tally. In round 15 of the 2016 VFL season, Dale kicked four goals to help the Bulldogs beat the Casey Scorpions by a singular point. He had his best game in the VFL in round 21, collecting 23 disposals, 8 marks and 3 goals to send Footscray into a qualifying final against Casey. He was also a key player in Footscray's 119-point win over Collingwood in the preliminary final, kicking two goals and collecting 17 disposals. Dale was quiet in the VFL side's premiership win, but still kicked a goal.

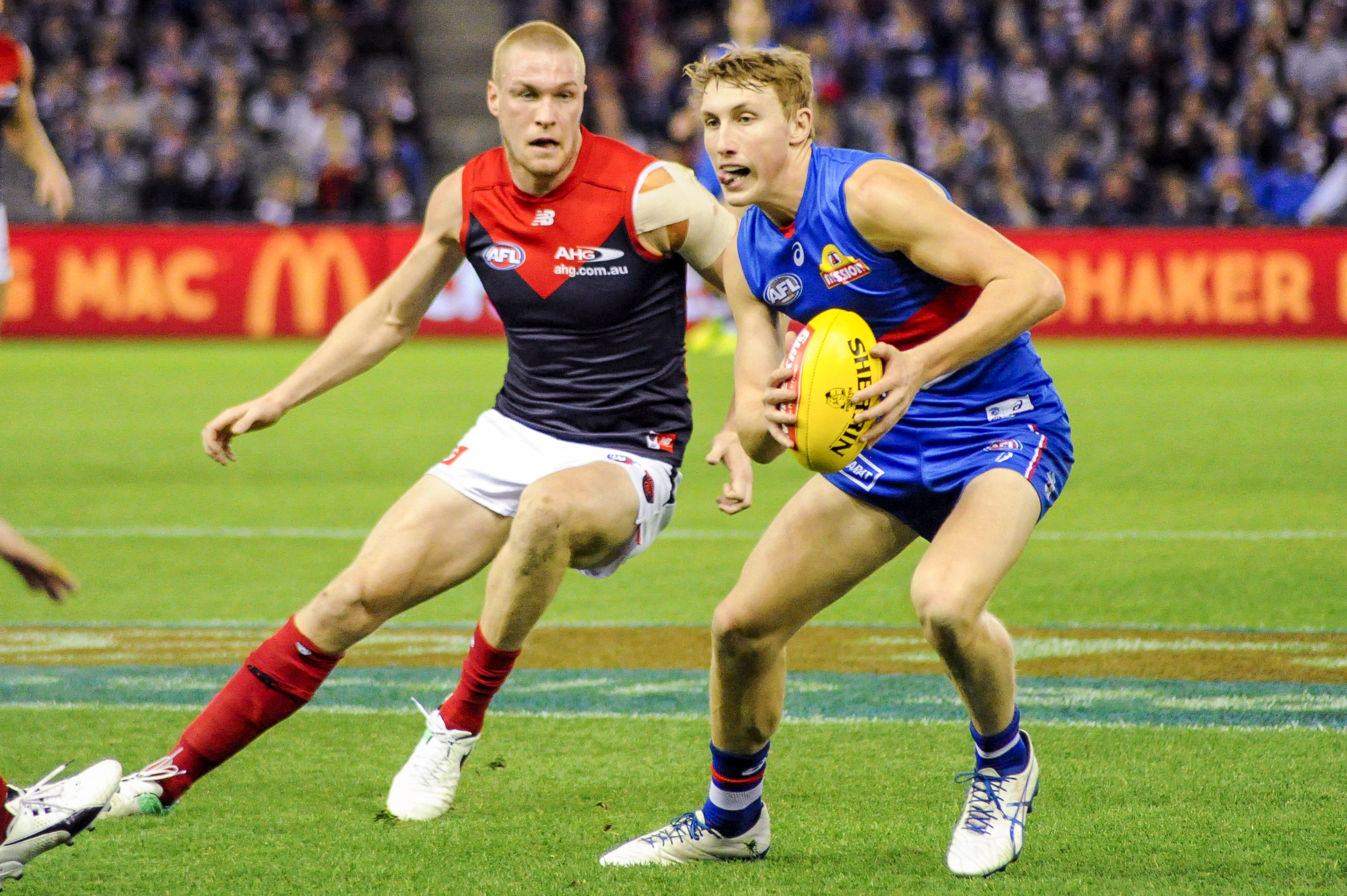
Bailey Dale evades Tom McDonald in Round 13, 2017

In the 2017 AFL season, Dale played 16 games and became a regular in the Bulldogs' best 22 side. After missing the first five rounds of the season, Dale was brought back into the team in round 6 as a late replacement for injured ruckman Tom Campbell. In his return game, he collected 18 disposals and a behind. After being dropped for the next game, Dale was again brought back into the side the following round, and from there played every game for the season. Dale had his breakout game against St Kilda in round 10, collecting 27 disposals and kicking a goal in a career best performance which saw him named in the team's best on ground. In round 17, Dale had another 27 disposal game against Carlton which saw him named in the team's best, this time kicking two goals with it to make it his best game to that point. Dale signed a two-year contract extension in August 2017, keeping him at the club until the end of the 2019 AFL season. He set a then-career high goals record against Port Adelaide in the penultimate round of the season, kicking four goals. Bailey Dale was named in the AFL Media's team of the week and was rated in the team's best by The Age, SEN and Footyology.com.au. At the conclusion of the season, Dale claimed the Tony Liberatore Most Improved Player Award after being recognised for his strong season, kicking a total of 17 goals from 16 games.

=== 2018–2020: Form struggles ===
The 2018 AFL season was a forgettable one for Dale, who played just 10 games in what was also a disappointing season for the Bulldogs. He had a 20 disposal, one-goal game to open the season as the Bulldogs got crushed by Greater Western Sydney. Dale contributed to a 21-point Bulldog win over Essendon in round 3, kicking two goals to help them get over the line. He also played a vital part in getting the Bulldogs across the line in round 8 against Brisbane Lions, kicking a goal and setting Marcus Bontempelli up with another to win the game, alongside his 24 disposals. Dale played his last senior game in round 10 in late May, suffering a low grade stress foot injury. Unfortunately for Dale, his injury got progressively worse, after the Bulldogs opted for surgery in order to repair his navicular bone, ending his 2018 season prematurely.

His move up forward he looks so much more dangerous than he did down back. I think he can be an All-Australian player next year.

— Chris Judd, two-time Brownlow Medallist and premiership player.

Dale had a breakout 2019 season despite only playing 10 games. He came back into the team in round 10, but was kept ineffective, with just 12 disposals and no goals. He had a better game the following round, kicking a goal and totalling 21 disposals, but a four-disposal game in round 13 saw him omitted from the team yet again. However, Dale's fortunes turned in round 18, when he was brought back into the team to play against St Kilda. This was his breakout game, kicking five goals in the eventual 27-point loss to be one of the team's best players, and secure a Brownlow Medal vote. From there, he would become one of the in-form players of the competition, kicking 20 goals in the last six rounds of the home-and-away season. He followed up his five-goal performance with four goals the following week, and was again named in the team's most valuable players. Dale kicked three goals in the 104-point victory over Essendon in round 21, and was yet again named in the team's best. After kicking two goals against Greater Western Sydney in the penultimate round of the season, Dale had another career-best performance, booting another five goals against Adelaide to close out the home-and-away season. He received nine coaches votes and one Brownlow vote for his performance. In September 2019, Dale signed a three-year contract extension to remain at the Western Bulldogs until at least the end of 2022.

Despite his impressive form in the second half of the 2019 season, the 2020 AFL season would be yet another inconsistent one for Dale, who played only nine games before being dropped out of the team. He started the season with some of the lowest numbers of his career, gaining just six and nine disposals in the first two rounds respectively, and returning no goals. Dale was put on report for spoil that hurt Sydney player Robbie Fox in round 4. However, the contact from Dale was deemed legal, and he played the next week, kicking a goal against North Melbourne. He kicked a goal each game for the remainder of the games he played throughout the season. After the team's victory over Essendon in round 7, Dale then was taken out of the team due to an ankle injury. He had to wait until round 11 to be brought back into the senior side. Despite kicking two goals from two games in rounds 11 and 12, he was omitted from the team, and did not return for the remainder of the season.

=== 2021–present: Switch to defence ===
The 2021 AFL season was an extraordinary one for Dale, who went from struggling in the forward-line to becoming an All-Australian defender. He worked on his fitness early in the pre-season with hard-running teammate Lachie Hunter. While Dale started the early pre-season up forward, he made a move down to the half-back flank in the team's 2021 AAMI Community Series win over Melbourne. Despite only having 16 disposals in the opening game of the season, this was to be his lowest number of disposals in a game that year, as he quickly settled into his new role. He had 23 disposals, 2 goals and 2 rebound 50s in the Bulldogs' biggest win in their club history against North Melbourne, showcasing his talent as a running half-back. In April, he was named by Champion Data as the most accurate kick of the football in the entire league, ranked 19.1 percent above the AFL average. He was named in the team's best in their round 6 win over Greater Western Sydney, and followed up this performance with arguably a team-best performance the next week, tallying 27 disposals, five intercepts and 636 metres gained, as well as 11 rebound 50s. Dale was again named as one of the best performing Bulldogs players in a 111-point smashing of St Kilda in round 10, kicking 2 goals and collecting 34 disposals, the latter a career record. His form across the half-back line impressed enough that some began suggesting Dale's inclusion in the 2021 All-Australian team. it was also reported that Dale's influence on the team in his half-back role had made them a more threatening premiership team, after he only dropped below 20 disposals and 580 metres gained once past round 3. Round 16 saw Dale kick 2 goals and have 23 disposals to again get the bulldogs to first place on the ladder with a win over North Melbourne. A 1-goal, 31 disposal performance in round 20 against Adelaide saw him receive 10 coaches votes and get named as best on ground by the media. Following the conclusion of the home-and-away season, Dale was announced as part of the 2021 All-Australian team, his maiden blazer.

== Statistics ==
Updated to the end of round 22, 2026.

Legend
G	Goals	K	Kicks	D	Disposals	T	Tackles
B	Behinds	H	Handballs	M	Marks

Season	Team	No.	Games	Totals							Averages (per game)							Votes
Season	Team	No.	Games	G	B	K	H	D	M	T	G	B	K	H	D	M	T	Votes
2015	Western Bulldogs	31	10	6	4	42	36	78	15	14	0.6	0.4	4.2	3.6	7.8	1.5	1.4	0
2016	Western Bulldogs	31	4	3	4	23	30	53	14	7	0.8	1.0	5.8	7.5	13.3	3.5	1.8	0
2017	Western Bulldogs	31	16	17	7	164	112	276	51	31	1.1	0.4	10.3	7.0	17.3	3.2	1.9	0
2018	Western Bulldogs	31	10	6	10	89	66	155	39	10	0.6	1.0	8.9	6.6	15.5	3.9	1.0	0
2019	Western Bulldogs	31	10	21	11	77	50	127	39	19	2.1	1.1	7.7	5.0	12.7	3.9	1.9	2
2020 (Note: The 2020 season was played with 17 home-and-away matches per team (down from 22) and 16-minute quarters with time on (down from 20-minute quarters with time on) due to the impact of the COVID-19 pandemic.)	Western Bulldogs	31	9	7	3	48	35	83	20	13	0.8	0.3	5.3	3.9	9.2	2.2	1.4	0
2021	Western Bulldogs	31	26	9	0	447	176	623	100	26	0.3	0.0	17.2	6.8	24.0	3.8	1.0	3
2022	Western Bulldogs	31	23	7	3	415	182	597	113	26	0.3	0.1	18.0	7.9	26.0	4.9	1.1	3
2023	Western Bulldogs	31	23	2	2	393	180	573	92	42	0.1	0.1	17.1	7.8	24.9	4.0	1.8	3
2024	Western Bulldogs	31	24	5	7	420	176	596	147	35	0.2	0.3	17.5	7.3	24.8	6.1	1.5	9
2025	Western Bulldogs	31	23	4	3	454	168	622	108	25	0.2	0.1	19.7	7.3	27.0	4.7	1.1	7
2026	Western Bulldogs	31	17	2	4	343	115	458	78	27	0.1	0.2	20.2	6.8	26.9	4.6	1.6	0
Career			195	89	58	2915	1326	4241	816	275	0.5	0.3	14.9	6.8	21.7	4.2	1.4	27
