= Christian Salem =

Australian rules footballer (born 1995)

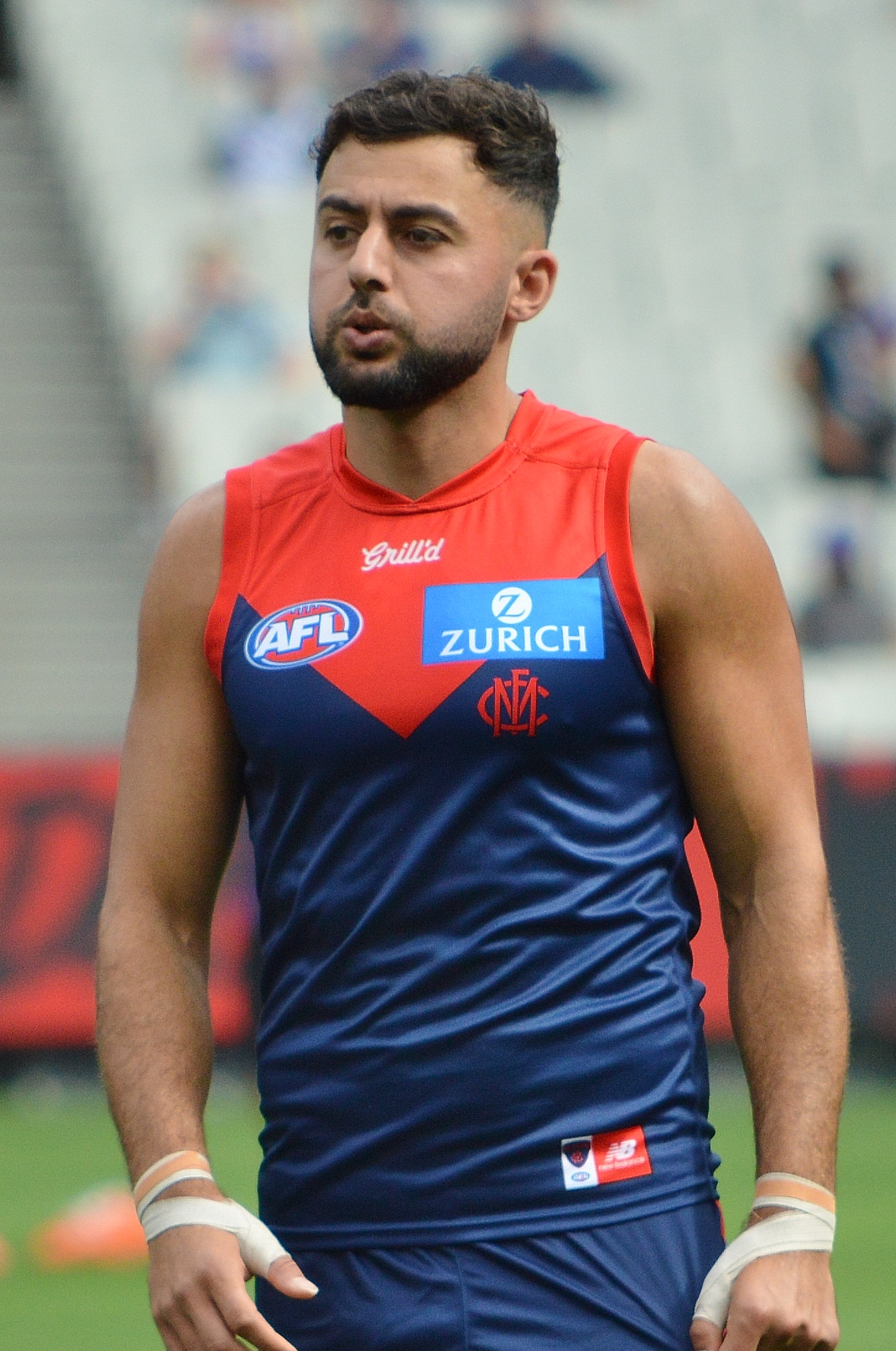
- Salem playing for Melbourne in April 2025

Personal information
- Full name: Christian Salem
- Born: 15 July 1995 (age 31)
- Original team: Sandringham Dragons (TAC Cup)/Brighton Grammar
- Draft: No. 9, 2013 national draft
- Debut: Round 6, 2014, Melbourne vs. Sydney, at MCG
- Height: 183 cm (6 ft 0 in)
- Weight: 81 kg (179 lb)
- Position: Defender

Club information
- Current club: Melbourne
- Number: 3

Playing career^{1}
Years	Club	Games (Goals)
2014–	Melbourne	208 (28)
- ^{1} Playing statistics correct to the end of 2026.

Career highlights
- AFL premiership player: 2021; Ivor-Warne Smith Memorial Trophy (4th MFC B&F): 2021; Dick Taylor Memorial Trophy (5th RFC B&F): 2025

Christian Salem (born 15 July 1995) is a professional Australian rules footballer playing for the Melbourne Football Club in the Australian Football League (AFL). A defender, 1.81 metres (5 ft 11 in) tall and weighing 81 kilograms (179 lb), Salem plays primarily as a half-back flanker, with the ability to push into the midfield and forward line. He was recognised as a talented footballer at a young age when he represented Victoria at under 12 level. He played top-level football early when he played in both the TAC Cup and AFL Under 18 Championships as a bottom-aged player. His achievements as a junior saw him selected with the ninth pick in the 2013 AFL draft by the Melbourne Football Club and he made his AFL debut during the 2014 season.

== Early life ==
Salem was born to Alex and Mary Salem, and is of Lebanese descent with his father being born in Lebanon. His talent was recognised from a young age when he received state selection in the under-12 Victorian side. He attended Brighton Grammar and played with the Robert Shaw coached first XVIIIs side from year nine, generally playing against year twelves.

Salem played his junior career with the Hampton Rovers Football Club and played for the Sandringham Dragons in the TAC Cup in both 2012 and 2013. He was selected to play for Victoria Metro in the 2012 AFL Under 18 Championships as a bottom-aged player and played in the winning final, kicking two goals. He received a scholarship through the AIS-AFL Academy as part of their level two squad in the 2012 intake, and travelled to Europe for two weeks in 2013. He received mid-year state honours for the second consecutive year and played for Victoria Metro in the 2013 AFL Under 18 Championships.

Salem was rated highly heading into the 2013 AFL draft and was predicted to be drafted inside the top ten due to his decision making and kicking precision, in addition, he drew comparisons to Luke Hodge, Nick Dal Santo and Dan Hannebery.

== AFL career ==
=== 2014–2017: Early career ===
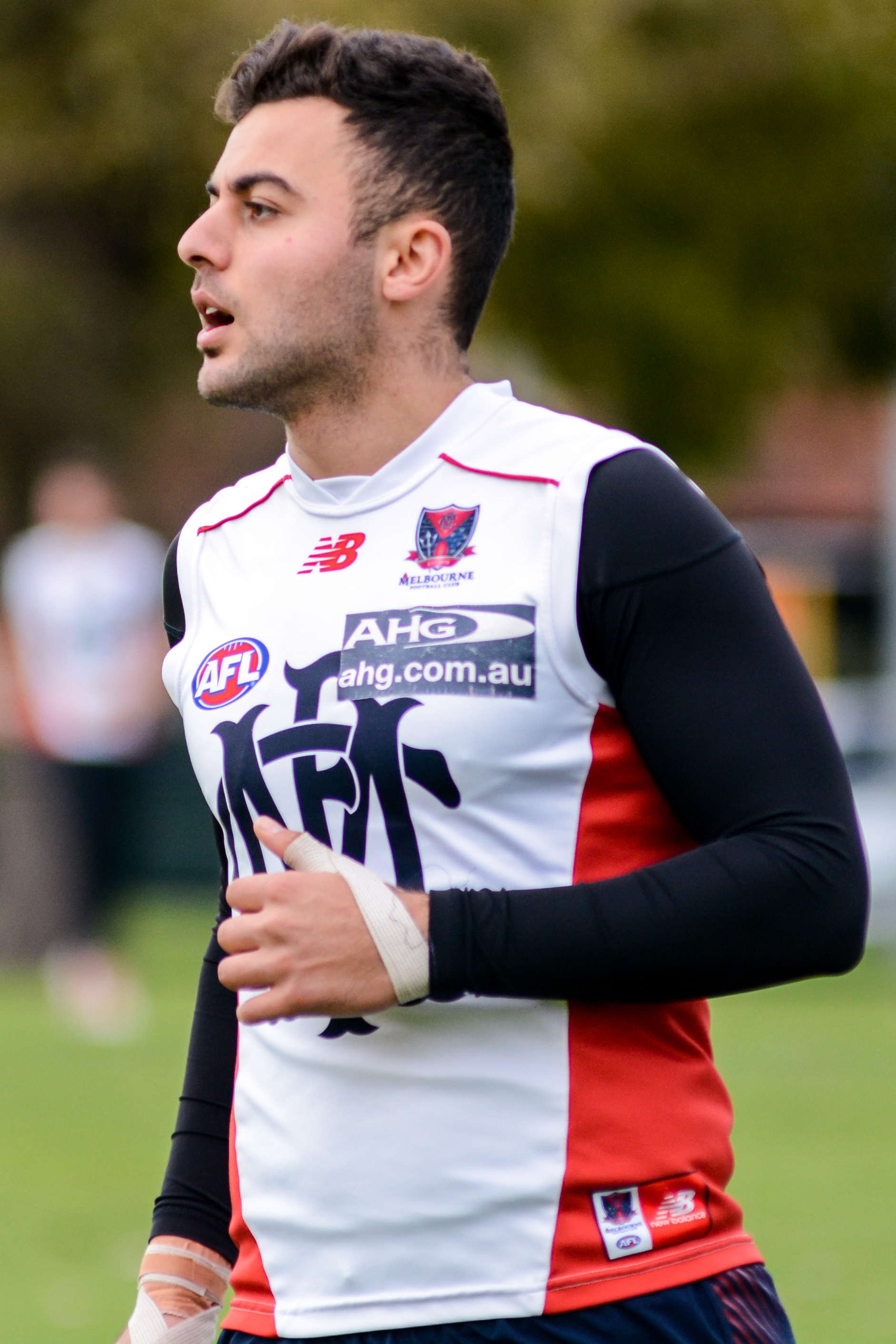
Christian Salem at training in July 2015

Salem was recruited by the Melbourne Football Club with their first selection and ninth overall in the 2013 national draft. During the pre-season, he suffered from a thyroid issue which saw him lose six kilograms in the month following the draft. He played the start of the season in the Victorian Football League (VFL) for Melbourne's affiliate team, the Casey Scorpions, and after strong form in the VFL, including a thirty-two possession game in the VFL round three match against Frankston at Frankston Park, he made his AFL debut a week later in the thirty-one point loss against Sydney at the Melbourne Cricket Ground in round six. In his seventh match, Salem was pivotal in Melbourne's comeback victory against Essendon in round thirteen, after marking the ball thirty metres directly in front of goal, he kicked the winning goal with nineteen seconds left in the match, giving Melbourne a one-point lead. He finished his debut season with twelve matches and senior Herald Sun football writer, Jay Clark, wrote he had the potential to become one of Melbourne's best players.

After playing his debut season in the forward line and a majority of matches as the substitute, Salem changed positions in 2015 and played predominantly on the half-back line. Playing the first seven matches of the season, he injured his hamstring in the round seven loss to Hawthorn and was initially ruled out for a month, however, after injuring his other hamstring, he ultimately missed two months and returned from injury playing in the VFL in round sixteen, before returning to the senior side in round twenty-one in the twenty-three point loss against Carlton at the Melbourne Cricket Ground. He played the remainder of the season and finished with ten matches overall.

After declaring his intentions to play in the midfield, Salem retained his spot on the half-back line whilst also playing on the wing and prior to the season, he was labelled as one of the players who could have a breakout season by AFL Media journalist, Ben Guthrie. Entrusted with the kick-ins for the season due to his elite kicking skills, Salem played the first six matches of the season before suffering from a concussion as a result of a head clash during the thirty-nine point loss against St Kilda at Etihad Stadium in round six. He returned two weeks later for the thirty-two point loss against the Western Bulldogs at the Melbourne Cricket Ground. After being omitted the next week and playing for Casey in the VFL, a recurrence of his thyroid issue would see him miss two months of any form of football, and he returned for Casey when he played against Coburg in round seventeen of the VFL season. After playing the next three weeks in the VFL, he returned to the senior side for the final match of the year in the 111-point loss against Geelong at Simonds Stadium, which saw him finish with eight matches for the season. His time in the VFL saw him qualify for the finals, and he played in the winning preliminary final against Williamstown in which he was stretchered off in the second quarter after losing consciousness from a tackle where his head hit the ground heavily. He subsequently missed the grand final, in which Casey lost to Footscray by thirty-one points at Etihad Stadium.

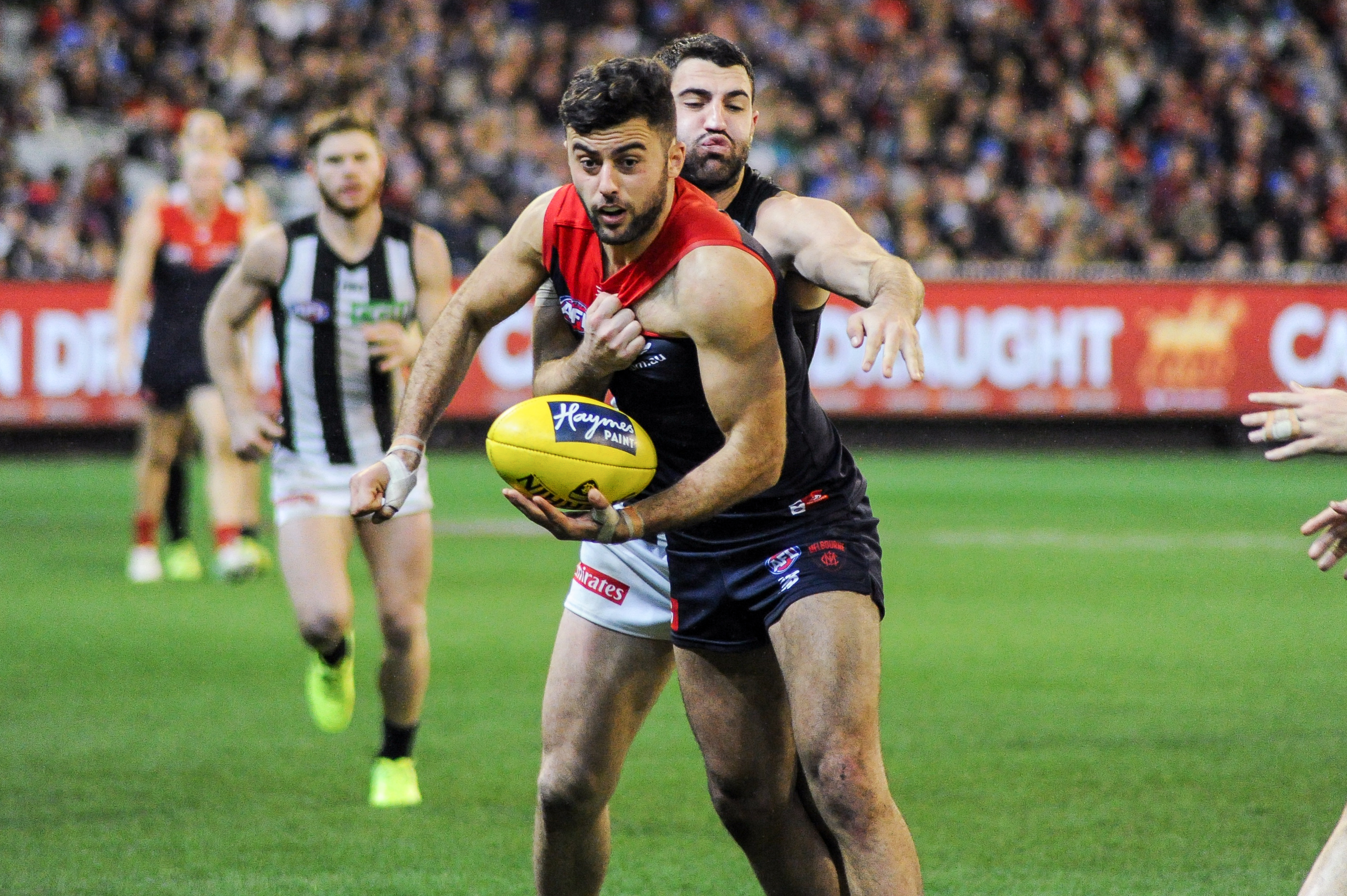
Salem handballing away from Collingwood's, Alex Fasolo, during round 12, 2017.

During the 2017 preseason, senior coach, Simon Goodwin, earmarked a move into the midfield for Salem in the upcoming season, however, he suffered a mishap during preseason training, in which he received his third concussion in 2016 due to a brick in his backpack hitting his head during a preseason camp in December. Despite the injury, he returned to full fitness in time for the start of the season and played in the opening round match against St Kilda at Etihad Stadium. The next week in the twenty-two point win against Carlton at the Melbourne Cricket Ground, he recorded a career-high thirty-one disposals, in addition to seven marks, seven rebound 50s, three tackles and a goal, to be named the best player on the field by AFL Media journalist, Ben Collins. In what was labelled his breakthrough game by Herald Sun reporter, Jay Clark, he received the maximum three Brownlow Medal votes, meaning he was adjudged the best player on the ground by the field umpires.

Salem played the first nine matches of the season, until he was suspended for the round ten match against Gold Coast at TIO Traeger Park due to striking North Melbourne's, Shaun Higgins, in the fourteen point loss the week before. He received high praise from the media during the first half of the season, with The Age journalist, Chloe Saltau, writing Salem's "polish and calm" was a key reason behind Melbourne's improved form, Fox Sport Australia's, Anna Harington, noted he was enjoying a breakout season and his elite kicking was a "valuable asset" to Melbourne, and AFL Media reporter, Ben Guthrie, reiterated by stating his "elite ball use and composure under pressure [was] proving to be an important component of Melbourne's side." Furthermore, he was named in AFL Media's team of the week for his performances in the round two match against Carlton and the round thirteen match against the Western Bulldogs.

Missing just the one match from rounds one to fourteen, Salem was forced to miss four weeks of football after sustaining a hamstring injury during the three-point win against West Coast at Domain Stadium in round fourteen. He returned for the twenty-three point win against Port Adelaide at the Melbourne Cricket Ground in round eighteen, and played three matches before he was omitted for the round twenty-one match against St Kilda at the Melbourne Cricket Ground. The same weekend when he was playing in the VFL, he was suspended for one week for striking Carlton forward, Liam Sumner, thus ruling him ineligible for selection for the round twenty-two match against Brisbane. He returned for the final round match against Collingwood at the Melbourne Cricket Ground and finished with sixteen matches for the season.

Christian Salem signs a two-year contract extension with Melbourne to remain with the club until the end of 2019. After dealing with thyroid and concussion issues in the past, Salem is averaging a career-high 22 disposals in 2017, with his elite ball use and composure under pressure proving to be an important component of Melbourne's side. "It's been a frustrating couple of years but I'm happy to be back out on the park," Salem said. "In terms of the thyroid, I'm getting regular blood tests once a month and I'm slowly weening myself off the tablets so we're just making sure that's all under control. At the moment it's going pretty well."

=== 2018–: Breakout success ===
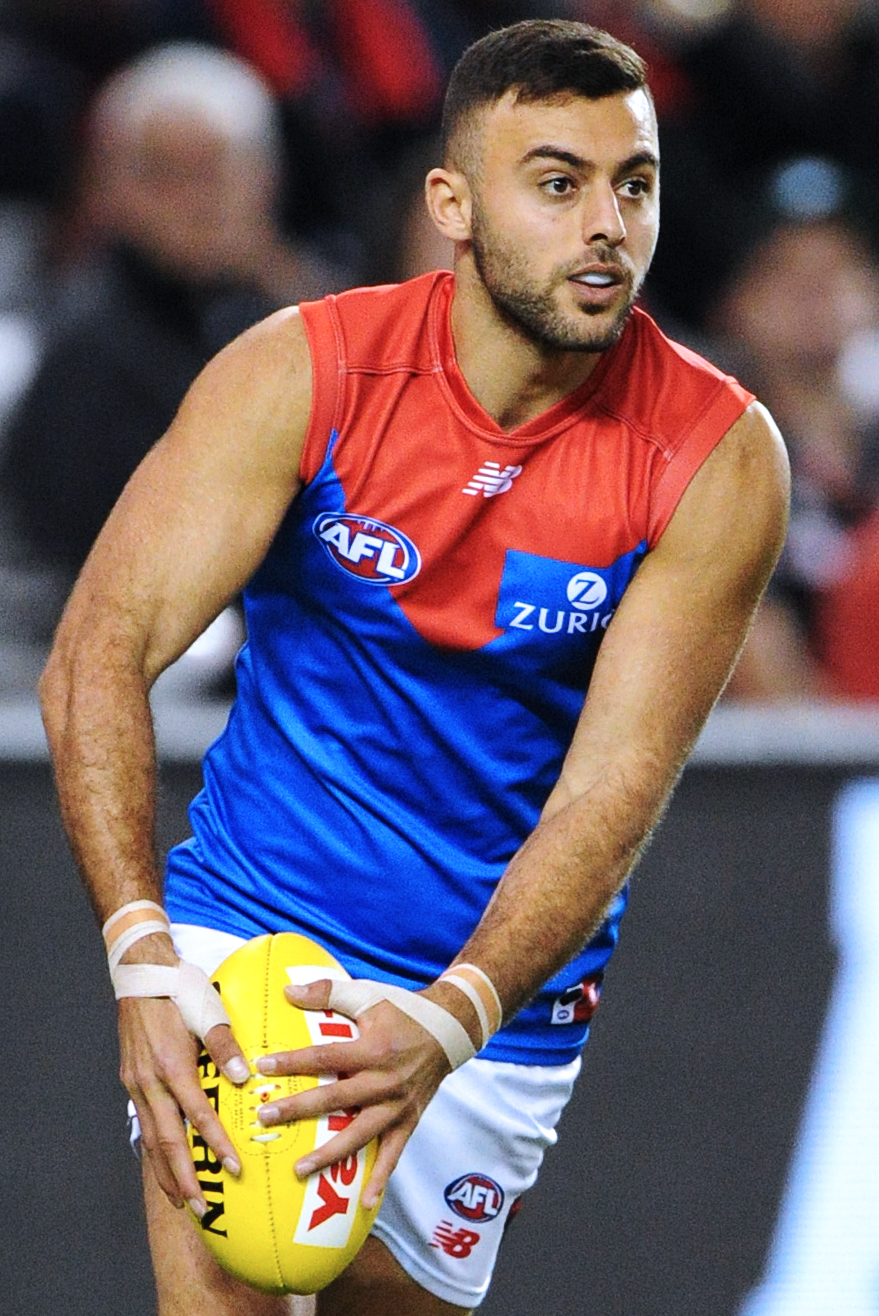
Salem playing in 2018

During the 2018 pre-season, Salem had an uninterrupted stretch of training allowing him to shift into an inside midfield role and train with the midfield group after being playing between the wing and half-back in his first years. Salem's desire for midfield minutes meant that he began training before the Demons' officially got their pre-season underway in November. He came to the club on day one of pre-season training in the best psychical shape of his career after a massive focus on getting his body AFL ready, following an intense training block in the off-season. During the pre-season match against North Melbourne, Salem attended the second-most centre bounces (21) of any Melbourne player, just one less than clearance specialist Clayton Oliver. Salem gathered 19 disposals at 84.2 per cent efficiency, winning five clearances and contributing two goal assists in a standout performance.

After spending the majority of his pre-season preparing for his transition into an inside midfielder, Salem played in Melbourne's midfield group for the first five rounds, with a stand out performance in round 3 against North Melbourne where he collected 20 disposals, 6 inside-50s, 12 contested possessions and 8 clearances, a career-high for Salem and team-high for Melbourne. Salem then returned to the half-back line in a team restructure. After suffering from injuries and poor form in his first four season, Salem played 22 of 23 games this year, as well as setting career highs in contested possessions (6.7), rebound 50s (3.9), inside 50s (2.4), metres gained (369.1), score involvements (4.6), clearances (1.6) and tackles (3.7). Salem was also rated kick rating and defensive-half pressure by Champion Data. Salem then played in all three finals for Melbourne, their first finals campaign since the 2006 AFL finals series

At the start of the 2019 AFL season, Salem inked a new 2 year contract extension with Melbourne, keeping him at the club until the 2021 season. "It was good to get it done before the season," Salem said about his new contract. "Last year was probably my most consistent year in terms of being able to stay out on the field. I'm just looking to go to a higher level in all aspects of my game."

Salem signed a 5 year contract extension, the longest of his career during the 2021 AFL season. Demons list manager Tim Lamb said of the signing that "Given he would have been eligible for free agency at the end of this year it is significant that he has forgone that opportunity to extend his time here so early in the season, Christian has developed into a crucial player and we believe he still has significant growth in his game. He is a much-loved and highly respected member of our playing group and we are excited to see what he can produce for the red and blue in the years to come." Salem went on to have the best year of his career as he continued to impress with his running ability off half-back and versatility across the ground with stints on the wing and midfield minutes. His home-and-away season earned him a debut spot in the All-Australian 40-man squad. One of Salem’s best games of the year came in Round 6, where he was instrumental in the side’s 34-point win over Richmond registering 39 disposals, nine intercept possessions and eight rebound 50s and was rewarded with a perfect 10 coaches votes. Salem’s year finished on a high as Melbourne broke a 57 year premiership drought and Salem himself had a solid performance which included 27 disposals (96.3% efficiency), seven inside 50s, seven rebound 50s, seven tackles and one goal. He earnt one Norm Smith Medal vote and two coaches votes.

== Statistics ==
Updated to the end of round 22, 2026.

Legend
G	Goals	K	Kicks	D	Disposals	T	Tackles
B	Behinds	H	Handballs	M	Marks

Season	Team	No.	Games	Totals							Averages (per game)							Votes
Season	Team	No.	Games	G	B	K	H	D	M	T	G	B	K	H	D	M	T	Votes
2014	Melbourne	3	12	6	6	57	24	81	24	22	0.5	0.5	4.8	2.0	6.8	2.0	1.8	0
2015	Melbourne	3	10	1	3	101	57	158	34	35	0.1	0.3	10.1	5.7	15.8	3.4	3.5	0
2016	Melbourne	3	8	1	0	87	59	146	17	29	0.1	0.0	10.9	7.4	18.3	2.1	3.6	0
2017	Melbourne	3	16	5	0	219	124	343	73	54	0.3	0.0	13.7	7.8	21.4	4.6	3.4	3
2018	Melbourne	3	24	6	7	320	174	494	85	84	0.3	0.3	13.3	7.3	20.6	3.5	3.5	2
2019	Melbourne	3	20	0	2	334	148	482	93	60	0.0	0.1	16.7	7.4	24.1	4.7	3.0	0
2020 (Note: The 2020 season was played with 17 home-and-away matches per team (down from 22) and 16-minute quarters with time on (down from 20-minute quarters with time on) due to the impact of the COVID-19 pandemic.)	Melbourne	3	16	2	0	200	101	301	64	42	0.1	0.0	12.5	6.3	18.8	4.0	2.6	0
2021^{#}	Melbourne	3	24	3	2	405	203	608	145	58	0.1	0.1	16.9	8.5	25.3	6.0	2.4	1
2022 (Note: 2022 statistics include one game in which Salem was substituted out of the game with an injury (round 1) and was replaced by Toby Bedford.)	Melbourne	3	13	1	1	148	78	226	59	37	0.1	0.1	11.4	6.0	17.4	4.5	2.8	0
2023	Melbourne	3	16	0	0	200	106	306	63	61	0.0	0.0	12.5	6.6	19.1	3.9	3.8	1
2024	Melbourne	3	17	1	2	226	114	340	99	47	0.1	0.1	13.3	6.7	20.0	5.8	2.8	1
2025	Melbourne	3	23	1	2	372	155	527	176	51	0.0	0.1	16.2	6.7	22.9	7.7	2.2	3
2026	Melbourne	3	7	1	0	88	31	119	20	13	0.1	0.0	12.6	4.4	17.0	2.9	1.9	0
Career			206	28	25	2757	1374	4131	952	593	0.1	0.1	13.4	6.7	20.1	4.6	2.9	11

== Honours and achievements ==
Team

- AFL premiership player (Melbourne): 2021
- McClelland Trophy (Melbourne): 2021

== Other work ==
Due to his Lebanese background, he was named one of the AFL's multicultural ambassadors during the 2017 season.
