= 2018 Melbourne Football Club season =

Melbourne Football Club
2018 season
- President: Glen Bartlett^{(5th season)}
- Coach: Simon Goodwin^{(2nd season)}
- Captains: Nathan Jones^{(5th season)} Jack Viney^{(2nd season)}
- Home grounds: MCG^{(100,024 capacity)}
- Finals series: Preliminary Final
- Highest home attendance: 77,071^{(round 5 vs. Richmond)}
- Lowest home attendance: 35,518^{(round 3 vs. North Melbourne)}
- Average home attendance: 41,889
- Club membership: 44,191^{(as at 29 July 2018)}

The 2018 Melbourne Football Club season is the club's 119th year in the VFL/AFL since it began in 1897.

== 2018 list changes ==
=== 2017 trades ===
Date	Trade gained	Traded from	Trade lost	Ref
12 October	Jake Lever; Pick 35; Third round pick (2018)	Adelaide	Pick 10; First round pick (2018); Fourth round pick (2018)	
17 October	Pick 31	Port Adelaide	Jack Watts	
18 October	Harley Balic	Fremantle	Pick 66	

=== Retirements and delistings ===
Player	New club	League	Reason	Career games	Career goals	Ref
Colin Garland	Melbourne	AFL	Retired, but stayed as an assistant coach	141	16	
Liam Hulett	Edithvale-Aspendale	MPNFL	Delisted	0	0	
Ben Kennedy	Montmorency	NFL	Delisted	40	28	
Heritier Lumumba	unknown	unknown	Retired	223	30	
Jake Spencer	Aspley	NEAFL	Delisted	38	8	
Jack Trengove	Port Adelaide	AFL	Delisted	86	39	
Mitch White	Casey	VFL	Delisted	4	0	

=== National draft ===
Round	Overall pick	Player	State	Position	Team from	League from	Ref
2	29	Charlie Spargo	VIC	Midfielder/forward	Murray Bushrangers	TAC Cup	
2	31	Bayley Fritsch	VIC	Forward	Casey	VFL	
2	37	Harrison Petty	SA	Defender	North Melbourne	SANFL	
3	48	Oskar Baker	QLD	Midfielder	Aspley	NEAFL	

== 2018 squad ==
Melbourne Football Club
Senior list		Rookie list	Coaching staff
1 Jesse Hogan; 2 Nathan Jones (c); 3 Christian Salem; 4 James Harmes; 5 Christian Petracca; 6 Jordan Lewis; 7 Jack Viney (c); 8 Jake Lever; 9 Charlie Spargo; 10 Angus Brayshaw; 11 Max Gawn; 12 Dom Tyson; 13 Clayton Oliver; 14 Michael Hibberd; 15 Billy Stretch; 16 Dean Kent; 17 Sam Frost; 18 Jake Melksham; 19 Mitch Hannan; 21 Cameron Pedersen	22 Aaron vandenBerg; 23 Bernie Vince; 24 Jay Kennedy Harris; 25 Tom McDonald; 26 Sam Weideman; 27 Harley Balic; 28 Oscar McDonald; 29 Jayden Hunt; 30 Alex Neal-Bullen; 31 Bayley Fritsch; 32 Tomas Bugg; 33 Oskar Baker; 34 Mitch King; 35 Harrison Petty; 36 Jeff Garlett; 37 Dion Johnstone; 39 Neville Jetta; 40 Pat McKenna; 42 Josh Wagner; 44 Joel Smith	20 Corey Maynard; 38 Tim Smith; 45 Declan Keilty; 47 Lachlan Filipovic	Head coach: Simon Goodwin; Assistant coaches: Brendan McCartney (player/coach performance); Troy Chaplin (offensive coordinator); Ben Mathews (stoppages); Matthew Egan (head of development); Max Rooke (development); Jade Rawlings (Casey VFL coach); Justin Plapp; Legend: (c) Captain(s); (vc) Vice-captain(s); Updated: 29 November 2017; Source(s): Players, Coaches

== 2018 season ==
=== Pre-season ===
==== AFLX ====
16 February (7:36 pm)	North Melbourne 5.4.9 (83)	def.	Carlton 5.2.6 (68)	Etihad Stadium, Melbourne (crowd: 22,585)	Report
16 February (8:32 pm)	Melbourne 1.9.6 (70)	def.	North Melbourne 3.2.4 (46)	Etihad Stadium, Melbourne (crowd: 22,585)	Report

	Grand Final
16 February (9:33 pm)	Melbourne 3.3.8 (56)	def.	Hawthorn 1.5.6 (46)	Etihad Stadium, Melbourne (crowd: 22,585)	Report

==== JLT Community Series ====
===== Week 1 =====
Round 1
Saturday, 24 February (2:05 pm)	North Melbourne	def. by	Melbourne	Kingston Twin Ovals (crowd: 1,957)	Report
3.1 (19); 6.4 (40); 7.4 (46); 11.5 (71)	Q1; Q2; Q3; Final	6.3 (39); 8.3 (51); 15.8 (98); 19.10 (124)	Umpires: Donlan, Meredith, Foote, Fisher; Television broadcast: Fox Footy
Hartung 2, Waite 2, Brown 2, Turner, Ziebell, Zurhaar, Larkey, Cunnington	Goals	Hogan 3, Fritsch 3, Harmes 2, Neal-Bullen 2, Bugg 2, T. McDonald, Vince, Petracca, Hannan, Melksham, Gawn, Maynard
Hartung, Cunnington, M. Williams, Vickers-Willis, Ziebell	Best	Melksham, Neal-Bullen, Hibberd, Harmes, Petracca, Salem, Fritsch
Nil	Injuries	Lewis (calf)
Nil	Reports	Nil

===== Week 2 =====
Round 2
Thursday, 8 March (7:05 pm)	Melbourne	def.	St Kilda	Casey Fields (crowd: 4,567)	Report
8.4 (52); 11.5 (71); 12.8 (80); 18.11 (119)	Q1; Q2; Q3; Final	4.1 (25); 6.4 (40); 12.7 (79); 14.9 (93)	Umpires: Rosebury, Fleer, Mollison; Television broadcast: Fox Footy
Oliver 2, Garlett 2, Brayshaw 2, Melksham 2, Hogan 2, Tyson, Petracca, Bugg, Hannan, Fritsch, Salem, Vince, Hunt	Goals	Bruce 3, Sinclair 2, Savage, Membrey, Clark, Billings, Armitage, McCartin, Steven, Gresham, Acres
Oliver, Gawn, Hibberd, Petracca, Lever, Hogan	Best	Billings, Acres, Ross, Geary, Savage, Steele
O. McDonald (back tightness)	Injuries	Steven (ankle)
Nil	Reports	Nil

=== Home-and-away season ===
==== Round 1 ====
Round 1
Sunday, 25 March (3:20 pm)	Melbourne	def. by	Geelong	Melbourne Cricket Ground (crowd: 54,112)	Report
6.1 (37); 8.5 (53); 12.9 (81); 13.16 (94)	Q1; Q2; Q3; Final	5.3 (33); 12.8 (80); 13.10 (88); 14.13 (97)	Umpires: Stevic, Deboy, Gavine; Television broadcast: Seven Network
Hogan 3, Pedersen 2, Neal-Bullen 2, Petracca, Garlett, Gawn, Oliver, Hannan, Fritsch	Goals	Menzel 4, Parfitt 2, Ablett, Smith, Kelly, Ratugolea, Murdoch, C. Guthrie, Parsons, Fogarty
Petracca, Gawn, Oliver, Jones, Hogan, Lewis	Best	Selwood, Ablett, Menzel, Duncan, Parfitt, Kelly
Nil	Injuries	Taylor (foot), Stewart (ankle), C. Guthrie (groin)
Nil	Reports	Nil
Debut(s): Bayley Fritsch; Debut(s) for MFC: Jake Lever (Adelaide); Milestone(s): Bayley Fritsch (1st AFL goal); Record: 0 losses, 1 win, 0 draws (96.91%); Ladder position: 9th

==== Round 2 ====
Round 2
Saturday, 31 March (6:25 pm)	Brisbane Lions	def. by	Melbourne	Gabba (crowd: 17,141)	Report
0.3 (3); 2.6 (18); 5.11 (41); 10.14 (74)	Q1; Q2; Q3; Final	5.4 (34); 8.7 (55); 9.11 (65); 14.16 (100)	Umpires: Fisher, Rosebury, Hosking; Television broadcast: Fox Footy
Cameron 3, Christensen 3, Bewick, Zorko, Hipwood, Cox	Goals	Hogan 5, Garlett 4, Jones 2, Fritsch 2, Neal-Bullen
Cameron, Christensen, Cox, Taylor, Zorko	Best	Hogan, Garlett, Oliver, Jones, Petracca
Nil	Injuries	Nil
Nil	Reports	Nil
Record: 1 win, 1 loss, 0 draws (113.45%); Ladder position: 6th

==== Round 3 ====
Round 3
Saturday, 7 April (2:10 pm)	Melbourne	def.	North Melbourne	Melbourne Cricket Ground (crowd: 35,518)	Report
3.2 (20); 9.7 (61); 12.13 (85); 18.15 (123)	Q1; Q2; Q3; Final	5.3 (33); 8.4 (52); 10.6 (66); 13.8 (86)	Umpires: Nicholls, Fleer, Mollison; Television broadcast: Fox Footy
Bugg 4, Kent 3, Garlett 3, Oliver 2, Hogan, Petracca, Vince, Fritsch, Lewis, Jones	Goals	Brown 4, Waite 3, Cunnington 2, Goldstein, Hartung, Simpkin, Ziebell
Gawn, Hogan, Petracca, Lewis, Salem, Kent	Best	Cunnington, Brown, Higgins, McDonald, Dumont
Melksham (cut head), Vince (groin)	Injuries	Tarrant (hamstring) late withdrawal, replaced in the selected side by Daw
Nil	Reports	Nil
Record: 2 wins, 1 loss, 0 draws (123.35%); Ladder position: 4th

==== Round 4 ====
Round 4
Sunday, 15 April (3:20 pm)	Hawthorn	def.	Melbourne	Melbourne Cricket Ground (crowd: 41,973)	Report
3.5 (23); 7.5 (47); 11.7 (73); 18.7 (115)	Q1; Q2; Q3; Final	5.5 (35); 5.9 (39); 5.11 (41); 6.12 (48)	Umpires: Foot, Margetts, Chamberlain; Television broadcast: Seven Network
Breust 4, Roughead 3, O'Brien 3, O'Meara 2, Smith 2, Gunston 2, Puopolo, Henderson	Goals	Kent 3, Hogan, Salem, Neal-Bullen
Shiels, Gunston, O'Meara, Smith, Breust, Sicily, Mitchell	Best	Oliver, Neal-Bullen, Hogan, N.Jones, Kent
Frawley (migraine), Rioli (knee), Puopolo (hamstring)	Injuries	Jetta (leg)
Nil	Reports	Nil
Milestone(s): Christian Salem (50th AFL game); Record: 2 wins, 2 losses, 0 draws (98.12%); Ladder position: 12th

==== Round 5 ====
Round 5
Tuesday, 24 April (7:25 pm)	Melbourne	def. by	Richmond	Melbourne Cricket Ground (crowd: 77,071)	Report
1.5 (11); 2.6 (18); 5.8 (38); 8.8 (56)	Q1; Q2; Q3; Final	2.2 (14); 5.8 (38); 8.9 (57); 15.12 (102)	Umpires: Foot, Rosebury, Williamson; Television broadcast: Seven Network
Melksham 4, Hogan 2, Garlett, Harmes	Goals	Higgins 3, Lloyd 2, Castagna 2, McIntosh 2, Riewoldt 2, Lambert 2, Prestia, Cotchin
Oliver, Hogan, Melksham, Jones, Hibberd, Gawn	Best	Martin, Edwards, Houli, Lambert, Grigg, Higgins
Kent (hamstring), Hibberd (nose)	Injuries	Nil
Vince (striking)	Reports	Nil
Record: 2 wins, 3 losses, 0 draws (96.89%); Ladder position: 14th

==== Round 6 ====
Round 6
Sunday, 29 April (1:10 pm)	Essendon	def. by	Melbourne	Etihad Stadium (crowd: 35,964)	Report
2.3 (15); 5.7 (37); 6.9 (45); 10.12 (72)	Q1; Q2; Q3; Final	1.3 (9); 4.7 (31); 11.10 (76); 16.12 (108)	Umpires: Foot, Rosebury, Williamson; Television broadcast: Fox Footy
Stringer 3, McDonald-Tipungwuti 2, Smith 2, Laverde, Stewart, Zaharakis	Goals	Hannan 3, Fritsch 3, Spargo 2, Gawn 2, Hogan 2, T. McDonald 2, Melksham 2
Z. Merrett, Zaharakis, Ambrose, Hurley, McGrath, Smith	Best	Gawn, Salem, Hannan, Hibberd, Fritsch, O. McDonald, T. McDonald
Nil	Injuries	Hogan (ankle)
Nil	Reports	Nil
Debut(s): Charlie Spargo; Milestone(s): James Harmes (50th AFL game), Charlie Spargo (1st AFL goal); Record: 3 wins, 3 losses, 0 draws (96.89%); Ladder position: 12th

==== Round 7 ====
Round 7
Sunday, 6 May (3:20 pm)	St Kilda	def. by	Melbourne	Etihad Stadium (crowd: 25,496)	Report
2.5 (17); 3.8 (26); 7.10 (52); 9.13 (67)	Q1; Q2; Q3; Final	5.1 (31); 8.6 (54); 13.10 (88); 16.10 (106)	Umpires: Foot, Fisher, McInerney; Television broadcast: Seven Network
Membrey 2, Long 2, Armitage 2, Gresham, Dunstan, Hickey	Goals	Hogan 3, T. McDonald 2, Weideman 2, Spargo, Gawn, Petracca, Jones, Tyson, Harmes, Brayshaw, Oliver, Neal-Bullen
Ross, Webster, Steven, Newnes	Best	Oliver, Hogan, Brayshaw, Tyson, Lewis, Hibberd
McCartin (head), Gilbert (leg), Savage (ribs)	Injuries	Jetta (head)
Nil	Reports	Nil
Record: 4 wins, 3 losses, 0 draws (103.59%); Ladder position: 10th

==== Round 8 ====
Round 8
Saturday, 12 May (4:35 pm)	Gold Coast	def. by	Melbourne	Gabba (crowd: 6,060)	Report
3.5 (23); 5.7 (37); 9.9 (63); 11.11 (77)	Q1; Q2; Q3; Final	4.5 (29); 8.11 (59); 13.17 (95); 21.20 (146)	Umpires: Brown, Schmitt, Harris; Television broadcast: Fox Footy
Martin 4, Day 2, Young, May, Sexton, Holman, Hall	Goals	T. McDonald 5, Hannan 3, Hogan 3, Neal-Bullen 2, Spargo 2, Salem 2, Gawn, Hibberd, Brayshaw, Melksham
Martin, Miller, May, Hall	Best	T. McDonald, Harmes, Oliver, Gawn, Salem, Brayshaw
Swallow (knee)	Injuries	Nil
Nil	Reports	Nil
Record: 5 wins, 3 losses, 0 draws (113.19%); Ladder position: 6th

==== Round 9 ====
Round 9
Sunday, 20 May (1:10 pm)	Carlton	def. by	Melbourne	Melbourne Cricket Ground (crowd: 44,142)	Report
3.1 (19); 5.3 (33); 7.6 (48); 7.8 (50)	Q1; Q2; Q3; Final	3.4 (22); 10.4 (64); 18.6 (114); 25.9 (159)	Umpires: Gavine, Hosking, Ryan; Television broadcast: Fox Footy
McKay 2, Lamb 2, Fisher, Murphy, Cripps	Goals	Melksham 5, T. McDonald 4, Neal-Bullen 4, Fritsch 2, Gawn 2, Hannan 2, Viney, Petracca, Harmes, Jones, Oliver, Hogan
Cripps, Graham, Fisher, Murphy, Rowe	Best	T. McDonald, Melksham, Jones, Brayshaw, Gawn, Lever, Neal-Bullen
Murphy (foot)	Injuries	Nil
Nil	Reports	Nil
Melbourne's final winning margin of 109 points was their greatest since their 121 point shellacking of Richmond in round 21, 1993 Melbourne's final winning margin of 109 points was their biggest ever win over Carlton, surpassing 105 points set in round 6, 2004 It was Melbourne's first 100+ victory since round 6, 2004 Record: 6 wins, 3 losses, 0 draws (127.03%); Ladder position: 3rd

==== Round 10 ====
Round 10
Sunday, 27 May (2:50 pm)	Melbourne	def.	Adelaide	TIO Traeger Park (crowd: 6,989)	Report
7.1 (43); 12.2 (74); 18.6 (114); 23.8 (146)	Q1; Q2; Q3; Final	3.1 (19); 4.2 (26); 5.4 (34); 8.7 (55)	Umpires: Donlon, Deboy, Brown; Television broadcast: Seven Network
Hogan 5, Neal-Bullen 3, Petracca 3, Brayshaw 3, Smith 2, Melksham 2, T. McDonald 2, Hannan, Jones, Spargo	Goals	Douglas 2, Betts 2, Gallucci, Fogarty, Gibson, Jenkins
Brayshaw, Oliver, Lever, Gawn, Viney, Neal-Bullen, Hogan	Best	Talia, M. Crouch, Laird, Greenwood, Doedee
Nil	Injuries	Seedsman (adductor) replaced in selected side by Poholke, Brown (concussion)
Nil	Reports	Nil
For the first time ever, Melbourne have won consecutive games by more than 90 points. Record: 7 wins, 3 losses, 0 draws (136.60%); Ladder position: 3rd

==== Round 11 ====
Round 11
Saturday, 2 June (1:45 pm)	Western Bulldogs	def. by	Melbourne	Etihad Stadium (crowd: 28,485)	Report
3.3 (21); 4.6 (30); 6.8 (44); 7.9 (51)	Q1; Q2; Q3; Final	2.1 (13); 7.4 (46); 11.7 (73); 15.10 (100)	Umpires: Chamberlain, Hay, Wallace; Television broadcast: Fox Footy
Bontempelli 2, Honeychurch, Schache, Gowers, Roughead, Suckling	Goals	Hogan 5, T.McDonald 4, Jones, Neal-Bullen, Petracca, Fritsch, Hannan, Brayshaw
Suckling, Bontempelli, Macrae, Hunter, Morris	Best	Brayshaw, Hogan, T.McDonald, Oliver, Jetta, Hibberd, Gawn
Dickson (hamstring)	Injuries	Lever (knee), Melksham (ankle), Smith (neck)
Nil	Reports	Nil
Milestone(s): Nathan Jones (250th AFL game); Record: 8 wins, 3 losses, 0 draws (140.19%); Ladder position: 3rd

==== Round 12 ====
Round 12
Monday, 11 June (3:20 pm)	Melbourne	def. by	Collingwood	Melbourne Cricket Ground (crowd: 83,518)	Report
2.0 (12); 7.2 (44); 11.5 (71); 14.7 (91)	Q1; Q2; Q3; Final	5.5 (35); 9.9 (63); 15.11 (101); 20.13 (133)	Umpires: Donlon, Haussen, Findlay; Television broadcast: Seven Network
T. McDonald 6, Hannan 2, Harmes, Fritsch, Neal-Bullen, Gawn, Viney, Oliver	Goals	Cox 5, Hoskin-Elliott 4, Stephenson 4, Thomas 3, Pendlebury, Mihocek, Adams, Treloar
T. McDonald, Jetta, Oliver, Smith, Jones	Best	De Goey, Cox, Adams, Hoskin-Elliott, Sidebottom, Treloar
O. McDonald (concussion), Jetta (shoulder)	Injuries	Wells (foot)
Nil	Reports	Nil
Milestone(s): Christian Petracca (50th AFL game); Record: 8 wins, 4 losses, 0 draws (130.44%); Ladder position: 5th

==== Round 13 ====
Round 13
Bye; Melbourne

==== Round 14 ====
Round 14
Friday, 22 June (7:20 pm)	Port Adelaide	def.	Melbourne	Adelaide Oval (crowd: 40,751)	Report
1.3 (9); 4.6 (30); 8.7 (55); 11.9 (75)	Q1; Q2; Q3; Final	3.5 (23); 4.8 (32); 9.9 (63); 9.11 (65)	Umpires: Deboy, Nicholls, Hay, McInerney; Television broadcast: Seven Network
Ebert 2, R.Gray 2, Westhoff 2, Wingard, Boak, Dixon, Thomas, S.Gray	Goals	T. McDonald 3, Hannan 2, Petracca, Smith, Melksham, Salem
Wines, Wingard, Jonas, Powell-Pepper, Rockliff, Westhoff	Best	Viney, Brayshaw, Oliver, Jones, T.McDonald, Jetta
Nil	Injuries	Jetta (head knock/ankle), T. McDonald (ribs)
Nil	Reports	Nil
Debut(s): Oscar McDonald (50th AFL game); Record: 8 wins, 5 losses, 0 draws (127.32%); Ladder position: 6th

==== Round 15 ====
Round 15
Sunday, 1 July (1:10 pm)	Melbourne	def. by	St Kilda	Melbourne Cricket Ground (crowd: 38,910)	Report
4.2 (26); 9.3 (57); 11.6 (72); 18.9 (117)	Q1; Q2; Q3; Final	4.3 (27); 11.6 (72); 14.10 (94); 18.11 (119)	Umpires: Deboy, Gavine, Pannell; Television broadcast: Fox Footy
Fritsch 4, Harmes 3, Hogan 3, Brayshaw 2, Petracca, Tyson, T.McDonald, Neal-Bullen, Melksham, Lewis	Goals	Gresham 4, Membrey 4, McCartin 2, Savage, Steele, Clark, Newnes, Armitage, Billings, Battle, Steven
Gawn, Brayshaw, Harmes, Viney	Best	Carlisle, Billings, Gresham, Sinclair, Steele, Steven, Armitage
Nil	Injuries	Brown (hamstring)
Nil	Reports	Nil
Debut(s): Harrison Petty; Record: 8 wins, 6 losses, 0 draws (124.38%); Ladder position: 7th

==== Round 16 ====
Round 16
Saturday, 7 July (7:10 pm)	Melbourne	def.	Fremantle	TIO Stadium (crowd: 8,689)	Report
2.9 (21); 5.15 (45); 9.18 (72); 13.24 (102)	Q1; Q2; Q3; Final	2.0 (12); 4.2 (26); 6.5 (41); 7.6 (48)	Umpires: O'Gorman, Chamberlain, Pannell; Television broadcast: Fox Footy
Oliver 2, Hogan 2, Melksham, Jones, Garlett, T.McDonald, Salem, Gawn, Spargo, Harmes, Neal-Bullen	Goals	Cox 2, Sheridan 2, Walters 2, Mundy
Oliver, Gawn, Brayshaw, T.McDonald, Viney, Petracca, Hogan	Best	S.Hill, Mundy, Cerra, Walters, Sheridan
Smith (hip)	Injuries	Nil
Nil	Reports	Nil
Record: 9 wins, 6 losses, 0 draws (127.85%); Ladder position: 6th

==== Round 17 ====
Round 17
Sunday, 14 July (4:35 pm)	Melbourne	def.	Western Bulldogs	Melbourne Cricket Ground (crowd: 30,305)	Report
3.4 (22); 6.9 (45); 14.9 (93); 18.11 (119)	Q1; Q2; Q3; Final	4.1 (25); 6.6 (42); 9.9 (63); 10.9 (69)	Umpires: Brown, Chamberlain, Jeffery; Television broadcast: Fox Footy
Hogan 4, McDonald 3, Garlett 2, Neal-Bullen 2, Spargo 2, Petracca, Melksham, Oliver, Hannan, Lewis	Goals	Wallis 3, Schache 2, Johannisen 2, Hunter, Lipinski, McLean
Gawn, Brayshaw, Oliver, Hogan, Melksham, Salem	Best	Macrae, Wallis, Hunter, Dunkley, Gowers
Hannan replaced Viney (toe) in the selected side	Injuries	Nil
Nil	Reports	Nil
Milestone(s): Alex Neal-Bullen (50th AFL game); Record: 10 wins, 6 losses, 0 draws (130.23%); Ladder position: 6th

==== Round 18 ====
Round 18
Saturday, 21 July (7:25 pm)	Geelong	def.	Melbourne	GMHBA Stadium (crowd: 30,125)	Report
2.1 (13); 5.3 (33); 8.4 (52); 14.16 (100)	Q1; Q2; Q3; Final	2.3 (15); 5.8 (38); 11.9 (75); 14.14 (98)	Umpires: Rosebury, Brown, Nicholls; Television broadcast: Seven Network
Hawkins 7, Dangerfield 2, Tuohy 2, Jones, Duncan, Henry, J Selwood, Kelly	Goals	T. McDonald 4, Garlett 2, Melksham 2, Brayshaw, Spargo, Jones, Hogan, Gawn, Petracca
Hawkins, Dangerfield, Kelly, Stewart, Blicavs, Ablett, Stanley	Best	Oliver, T McDonald, Harmes, Petracca, Lewis, Brayshaw
Nil	Injuries	Nil
Nil	Reports	Nil
Milestones(s): Jake Melksham (150th AFL game), Nathan Jones (100th game as MFC captain), Angus Brayshaw (50th AFL game); Record: 10 wins, 7 losses, 0 draws (127.91%); Ladder position: 6th

==== Round 19 ====
Round 19
Saturday, 28 July (7:10 pm)	Adelaide	def. by	Melbourne	Adelaide Oval (crowd: 45,880)	Report
4.4 (28); 6.8 (44); 7.10 (52); 10.17 (77)	Q1; Q2; Q3; Final	3.1 (19); 5.7 (37); 12.11 (83); 13.12 (90)	Umpires: Stevic, Meredith, Harris; Television broadcast: Seven Network
Greenwood 2, Betts 2, Seedsman, Gibbs, Murphy, Atkins, Gallucci, Walker	Goals	T. McDonald 3, Lewis 2, Melksham 2, Fritsch 2, Kennedy Harris, Jetta, Hogan, Neal-Bullen
M.Crouch, Milera, Laird, Gibbs, Atkins	Best	Oliver, T. McDonald, Petracca, Gawn, Harmes, Lewis
Seedsman (hamstring)	Injuries	Nil
Nil	Reports	Nil
Milestones(s): Jordan Lewis (300th AFL game), Dom Tyson (100th AFL game); Record: 11 wins, 7 losses, 0 draws (127.33%); Ladder position:

==== Round 20 ====
Round 20
Sunday, 5 August (3:20 pm)	Melbourne	def.	Gold Coast	Melbourne Cricket Ground (crowd: 23,072)
9.3(57); 14.6(90); 16.12(108); 21.17(143)	Q1; Q2; Q3; Final	1.0(6); 4.2(26); 5.4(34); 7.5(47)	Umpires: Foot, Schmitt, Hay; Television broadcast: Seven Network
Hogan 4, Harmes 3, Spargo 2, Oliver 2, Garlett 2, Neal-Bullen 2, Jones 2, Petracca 2, Salem, Brayshaw	Goals	Sexton 5, Holman, Rischitelli
Oliver, Brayshaw, Hogan, Salem, Garlett, Harmes	Best	Sexton, Bowes, Harbrow, Weller, Fiorini
Smith (shoulder)	Injuries	Wright (knee)
nil	Reports	nil
The 96 point thrashing of Gold Coast means that the Demons have won their 3rd game by 90+ points in a single season, the first time they've ever done that in their history

==== Round 21 ====
Round 21
Sunday, 12 August (3:20 pm)	Melbourne	def. by	Sydney	Melbourne Cricket Ground (crowd: 51,424)
2.6 (18); 3.12 (30); 7.14 (56); 10.18 (78)	Q1; Q2; Q3; Final	1.1 (7); 7.2 (44); 13.6 (84); 13.9 (87)	Umpires: Dalgleish, Nicholls, Fleer; Television broadcast: Seven Network
vandenBerg 3, Tom McDonald 2, Petracca, Hogan, Pedersen, Garlett, Jones	Goals	Papley 3, Heeney 2, Franklin 2, Cunningham, Hayward, Hannebery, Dawson, Kennedy, McCartin
Brayshaw, Tyson, Harmes, Oliver, Salem	Best	Lloyd, Heeney, Newman, Aliir, Franklin, Kennedy, Hewett
Hunt (ankle), Jetta (nose), Hogan (foot)	Injuries	Johnson (knee), Smith (back)
nil	Reports	nil

==== Round 22 ====
Round 22
Sunday, 19 August (1:20 pm)	West Coast	def. by	Melbourne	Optus Stadium (crowd: 55,824)
3.0 (18); 5.4 (34); 11.6 (72); 14.7 (91)	Q1; Q2; Q3; Final	4.4 (28); 7.6 (48); 12.8 (80); 16.12 (108)	Umpires: Stevic, Hosking, Schmitt; Television broadcast: Seven Network
Rioli 3, Hutchings 2, Masten, Ah Chee, Cripps, Vardy, Sheed, Yeo, Venebles, LeCras, Ryan	Goals	Melksham 4, McDonald 3, Hannan 3, Weideman, Harmes, Brayshaw, vandenBerg, Jones, Kent
Rioli, Redden, Hutchings, Sheed, Masten	Best	Harmes, Melksham, Hannan, Brayshaw, Gawn, Jones
Darling (concussion)	Injuries	nil
nil	Reports	nil

==== Round 23 ====
Round 23
Sunday 26 August (3:20pm)	Melbourne	def.	Greater Western Sydney	Melbourne Cricket Ground (crowd: 37,285)
4.2 (26); 7.6 (48); 12.9 (81); 15.12 (102)	Q1; Q2; Q3; Final	4.1 (25); 5.5 (35); 5.8 (38); 8.9 (57)	Umpires: Dalgleish, Rosebury, Stevic; Television broadcast: Seven Network
Tom McDonald 3, Petracca 3, Neal-Bullen 2, Harmes, vandenBerg, Brayshaw, Gawn, Jones, Weideman, Melksham	Goals	Coniglio 2, Tomlinson, Lobb, Cameron, Himmelberg, Langdon, Finlayson
Gawn, Harmes, Brayshaw, Oliver, Petracca, Jones, Frost	Best	Coniglio, Ward, Shiel, Haynes, Kennedy
Kent (right shoulder), Tyson (left wrist), Melksham (head)	Injuries	Coniglio, Ward, Shiel, Haynes, Kennedy
nil	Reports	nil
The win means Melbourne finishes season 2018 5th on the ladder, meaning they will play finals for the first time since 2006, ending a 12 year drought.

== Ladder ==
Pos	Team	Pld	W	L	D	PF	PA	PP	Pts	Qualification
1	Richmond	22	18	4	0	2143	1574	136.1	72	2018 finals
2	West Coast (P)	22	16	6	0	2012	1657	121.4	64	2018 finals
3	Collingwood	22	15	7	0	2046	1699	120.4	60	2018 finals
4	Hawthorn	22	15	7	0	1972	1642	120.1	60	2018 finals
5	Melbourne	22	14	8	0	2299	1749	131.4	56	2018 finals
6	Sydney	22	14	8	0	1822	1664	109.5	56	2018 finals
7	Greater Western Sydney	22	13	8	1	1898	1661	114.3	54	2018 finals
8	Geelong	22	13	9	0	2045	1554	131.6	52	2018 finals
9	North Melbourne	22	12	10	0	1950	1790	108.9	48	
10	Port Adelaide	22	12	10	0	1780	1654	107.6	48	
11	Essendon	22	12	10	0	1932	1838	105.1	48	
12	Adelaide	22	12	10	0	1941	1865	104.1	48	
13	Western Bulldogs	22	8	14	0	1575	2037	77.3	32	
14	Fremantle	22	8	14	0	1556	2041	76.2	32	
15	Brisbane Lions	22	5	17	0	1825	2049	89.1	20	
16	St Kilda	22	4	17	1	1606	2125	75.6	18	
17	Gold Coast	22	4	18	0	1308	2182	59.9	16	
18	Carlton	22	2	20	0	1353	2282	59.3	8	

Source: AFL
Rules for classification: 1) points; 2) percentage; 3) number of points for.
(P) Premiers

=== Ladder breakdown by opposition ===
Opponent	Played	Won	Lost	Drew	Premiership points	Points for	Points against	Percentage (%)
Western Bulldogs	2	2	0	0	8	219	120	182.50%
Adelaide	2	2	0	0	8	236	132	178.79%
Carlton	1	1	0	0	4	159	50	318.00%
Fremantle	1	1	0	0	4	102	48	212.50%
Gold Coast	1	1	0	0	4	146	77	189.61%
Essendon	1	1	0	4	0	108	72	150.00%
North Melbourne	1	1	0	0	4	123	86	143.02%
Brisbane Lions	1	1	0	0	4	100	74	135.14%
St Kilda	1	1	1	0	4	223	186	119.89%
Geelong	2	0	2	0	0	192	197	97.46%
Port Adelaide	1	0	1	0	0	65	75	86.67%
Collingwood	1	0	1	0	0	91	133	68.42%
Richmond	1	0	1	0	0	56	102	54.90%
Hawthorn	1	0	1	0	0	48	115	41.74%
Greater Western Sydney	0	0	0	0	0	0	0	0.00%
Sydney	0	0	0	0	0	0	0	0.00%
West Coast	0	0	0	0	0	0	0	0.00%
Total	18	11	7	0	48	1868	1467	127.33%

== Tribunal/match review officer cases ==
Player	Round	Charge category	Verdict	Early Plea	Result	Victim	Club	Ref(s)
Jordan Lewis	Round 2	Misconduct	Guilty	Yes	$1500	Rhys Mathieson	Brisbane Lions	
Sam Frost	Round 3	Rough conduct	Guilty	Yes	$2000	Jed Anderson	North Melbourne	
Sam Frost	Round 3	Misconduct	Guilty	Yes	$1500	Isaac Smith	Hawthorn	
Bernie Vince	Round 6	Striking	Guilty	Yes	$2000	Darcy Parish	Essendon	
Nathan Jones	Round 7	Misconduct	Guilty	Yes	$1500	Jack Newnes	St Kilda	
Jordan Lewis	Round 12	Misconduct	Guilty	Yes	$2000	Steele Sidebottom	Collingwood	
Oscar McDonald	Round 14	Rough conduct	Guilty	Yes	$2000	Todd Marshall	Port Adelaide	
Jesse Hogan	Round 16	Misconduct	Guilty	Yes	$1500	Lachie Neale	Fremantle	
Jordan Lewis	Round 16	Striking	Guilty	Yes	$2000	Michael Walters	Fremantle	
Nathan Jones	Round 16	Misconduct	Guilty	Yes	$2000	Lachie Neale	Fremantle	
