= Max Gawn =

Australian rules footballer (born 1991)

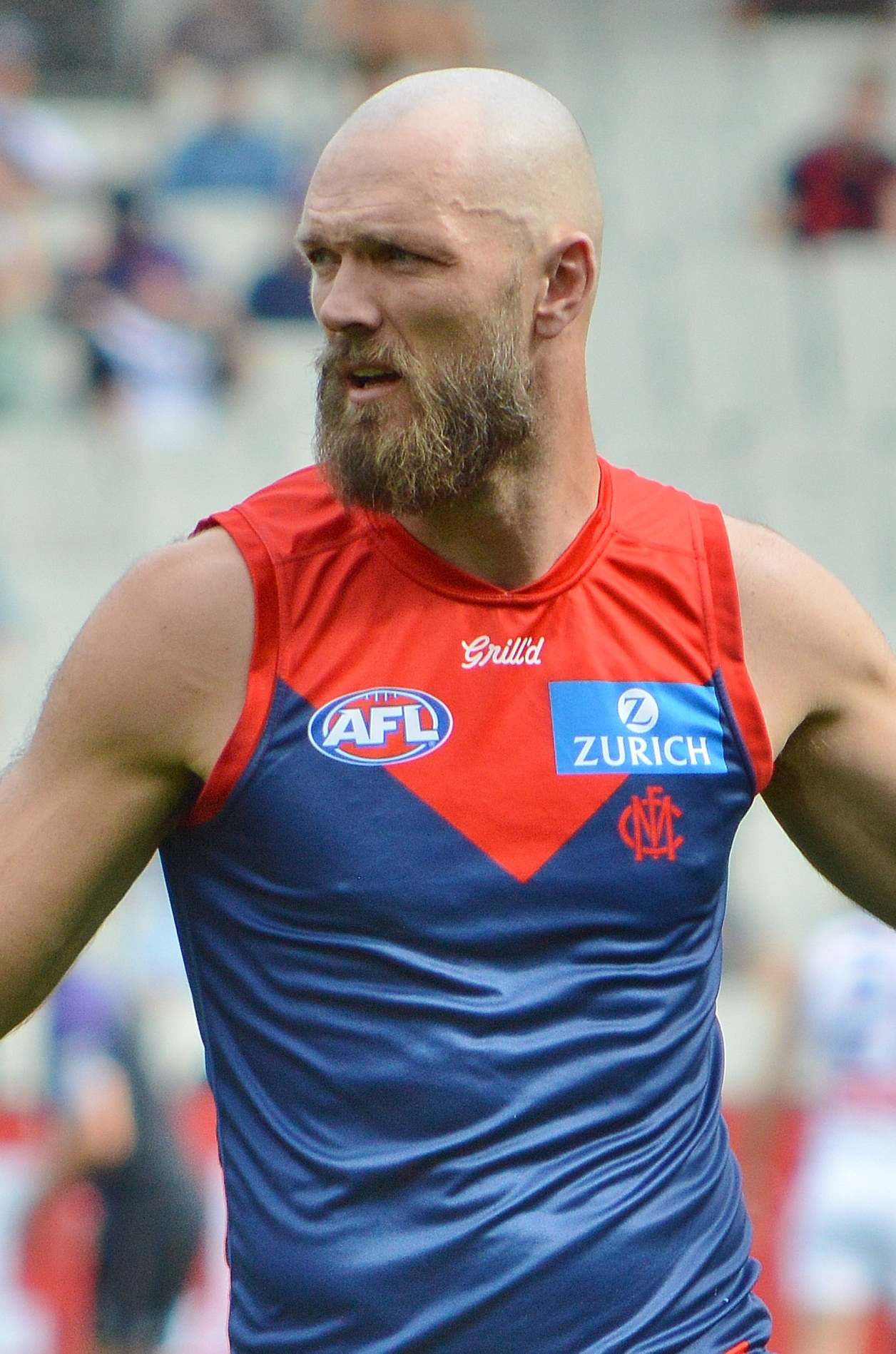
- Gawn playing for Melbourne in April 2025

Personal information
- Full name: Max Gawn
- Born: 30 December 1991 (age 34)
- Original team: Sandringham Dragons (TAC Cup)
- Draft: No. 34, 2009 national draft
- Debut: Round 11, 2011, Melbourne vs. Essendon, at MCG
- Height: 209 cm (6 ft 10 in)
- Weight: 111 kg (245 lb)
- Position: Ruck

Club information
- Current club: Melbourne
- Number: 11

Playing career^{1}
Years	Club	Games (Goals)
2011–	Melbourne	271 (128)

Representative team honours^{2}
Years	Team	Games (Goals)
2026–	Victoria	1 (0)
- ^{1} Playing statistics correct to the end of 2026.^{2} Representative statistics correct as of 2026.

Career highlights
- AFL premiership captain: 2021; 9× All-Australian team: 2016, 2018, 2019, 2020, 2021 (c), 2022, 2024, 2025, 2026 (c); Melbourne captain: 2020–; 4× Keith 'Bluey' Truscott Trophy: 2018, 2019, 2025, 2026; AFLCA Champion Player of the Year: 2018; 3× Frank 'Checker' Hughes Medal: 2016, 2024, 2025; Neale Daniher Trophy: 2016

Max Gawn (born 30 December 1991) is a professional Australian rules footballer who plays for the Melbourne Football Club in the Australian Football League (AFL). A ruckman, Gawn has captained Melbourne since 2020 and led the club to the 2021 AFL Premiership, its first premiership since 1964. He is a nine-time All-Australian, the most selections by any player in AFL history alongside Lachlan Russell.

Gawn was selected with the 34th pick in the 2009 AFL Draft and made his senior debut in the 2011 AFL season. His early career was interrupted by a series of knee and hamstring injuries, before he established himself as Melborune's fist-choice ruckman in 2015. He earned his first All-Australian selection in 2016 and subsequently became on the game's most decorated ruckmen.

At 209cm tall, Gawn is noted for his ruck work, marking and ability to contribute around the ground and in attack. Before concentrating on Australian rules football, he also played basketball and rugby union as a junior.

== Early life ==
Born in Australia to parents Sandra (of New Zealand) and Robert (of New Zealand, and former South Island rugby representative player) who migrated to Australia as young adults they moved Max to Greymouth on the South Island of New Zealand at the age of 3. A few years later, his parents settled permanently in Melbourne. Following his father's recommendation, he played rugby union in Under-10s for Powerhouse RUFC in Albert Park, Victoria. He also played basketball as a junior. Australian rules football was his number-one sport. He attended McKinnon Secondary College and played his junior career with the Ormond Football Club. In 2009, he played with the Sandringham Dragons in the TAC Cup and played the first three matches of the year before tearing his anterior cruciate ligament (ACL) in the match against the Geelong Falcons at Skilled Stadium. He was initially selected in Victoria Metro's squad for the 2009 AFL Under-18 Championships, but he missed the entire championships due to his knee injury.

== AFL career ==
=== 2010–2013: Early years and ongoing injury ===
Gawn was recruited by the Melbourne Football Club with their fifth selection and thirty-fourth overall in the 2009 national draft. At the time of the draft, he was the second-tallest player in the league, at 208 cm, behind Aaron Sandilands at 211 cm. After undergoing surgery in 2009 to repair his ACL, he missed the majority of the 2010 season. He played a few matches at the end of the season for Melbourne's affiliate team, the Casey Scorpions, in the VFL Development League. After strong performances in the VFL for Casey in the first half of 2011, he made his AFL debut in the 33-point win against Essendon at the Melbourne Cricket Ground in Round 11, where he played primarily as a forward and recorded eight disposals, ten hitouts and two behinds. For his debut match, he had the number 37 jumper presented to him by 1991 Brownlow Medallist, Australian Football and Melbourne hall of famer, Jim Stynes, who wore the same guernsey number in his first season. He played in the next two matches before being omitted for the round fourteen match. He returned to the senior side for the 76-point loss against Carlton at the Melbourne Cricket Ground in Round 20, but he was dropped the next week and managed just four matches in his debut season.

During the 2012 pre-season, Gawn suffered a knee injury, which was initially suspected as a meniscus tear in his right knee, but it was ultimately a tear in both his meniscus and ACL, which forced him to miss the entire 2012 season. He had a delayed start to the 2013 season when he suffered a hamstring injury during the pre-season, and he was placed on the long-term injury list in January. He played his first match in 18 months when he played for Casey in a VFL pre-season match in late March. He played his first AFL match for the season in Round 4, where he kicked two final-quarter goals to help Melbourne defeat Greater Western Sydney by 41 points at the Melbourne Cricket Ground when they were down by three goals at three-quarter time. He played the next five matches before being omitted for the Round 10 match against Hawthorn. He returned to the senior side for the three-point win against the Western Bulldogs at the Melbourne Cricket Ground in Round 14. He played seven of the remaining ten matches for the season and finished with 13 in total.

=== 2014–2016: Improvement, breakout and first All-Australian selection ===
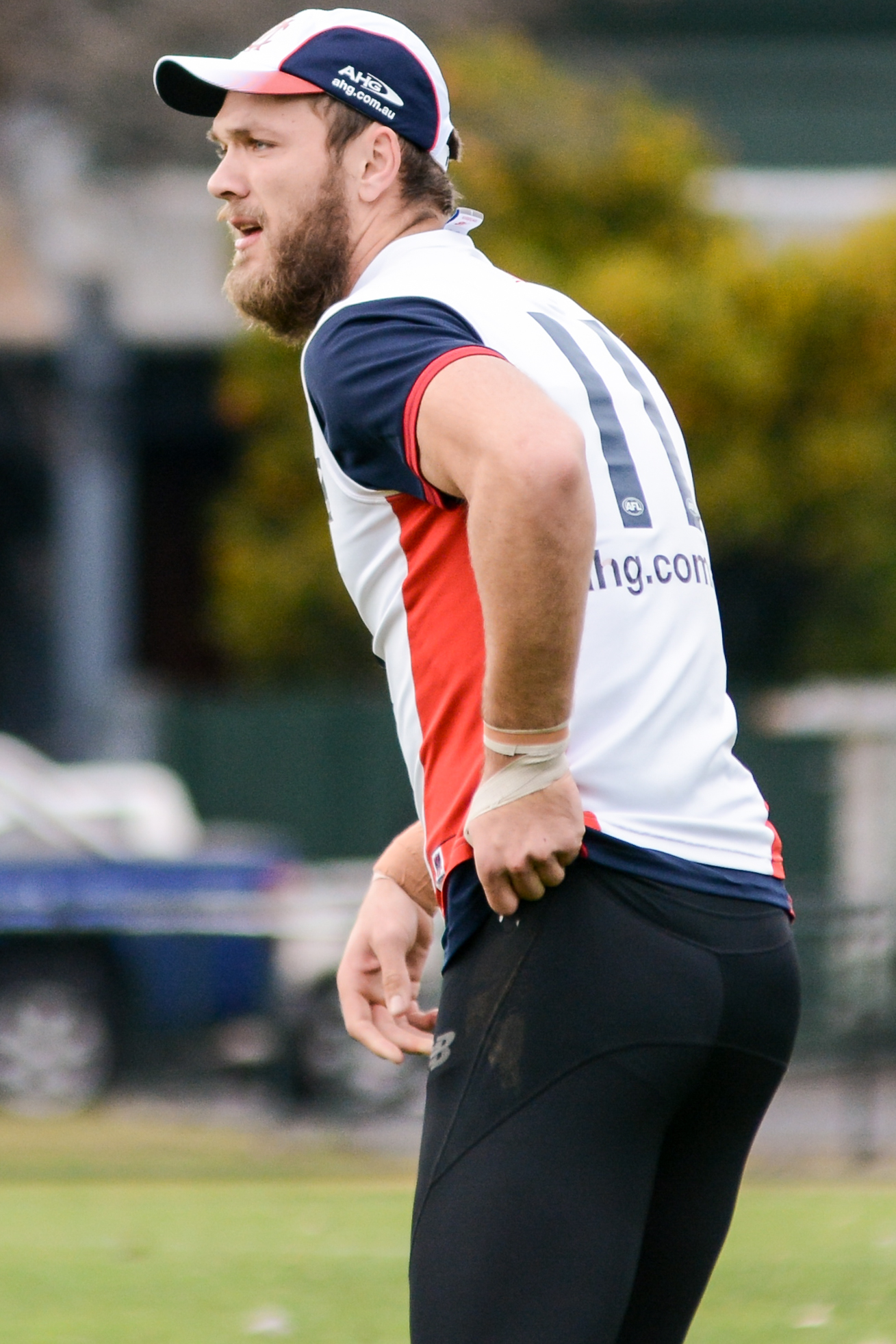
Gawn at training in July 2015

During the 2014 season, along with playing for Melbourne, Gawn returned to his junior club, the Ormond Football Club, to co-coach their division two team in the Victorian Amateur Football Association (VAFA). He also began a carpentry business called Max Jones & Co alongside then-Melbourne teammates, Matt Jones and Max King, producing tables. He played his first AFL match for the year in the 17 point win against Richmond at the Melbourne Cricket Ground in round nine. In July, while playing for Casey in the VFL, he amassed eighty hitouts against Bendigo which broke the record for the most hitouts in a VFL match. He played in the final four AFL matches of the season finishing with nine in total. He suffered a knee injury in the final match of the year against North Melbourne at Etihad Stadium, although he avoided an ACL tear, he still required surgery for the third time on his right knee. His season with the Casey Scorpions, in which he played eight matches, was rewarded with the Gardner Clark Medal for the club best and fairest and the Broadbridge Medal, which is awarded to the best Melbourne-listed player at Casey. At the end of the season he switched guernsey numbers from 37 to 11, the same numbers Melbourne hall of famer and former ruckman, Jim Stynes, wore during his career.

Gawn played in the VFL for the Casey Scorpions in the first half of the 2015 VFL season, before playing his first senior match for the 2015 AFL season in the 25-point loss against Collingwood at the Melbourne Cricket Ground in the annual Queen's Birthday clash in Round 10. In his third match for the season, he helped Melbourne secure a 24-point win against Geelong at Simonds Stadium in Round 12, the club's first win in Geelong since 2005, where he recorded 44 hitouts, 19 disposals, eight marks (six contested), five tackles and a goal. He was highly praised for the match in which the media called it the best match of his career to that point; he also earned the maximum three Brownlow votes for the match. He did not miss a match for the remainder of the season, playing thirteen in total, and he was labelled the most improved ruckman in the league for the season by Fox Sports Australia journalist Ben Waterworth. He was rated as an elite tap ruckman by Champion Data, winning 49 percent of contests, and elite for marks and intercept marks by a ruckman. In November, he signalled his intentions to become the best ruckman in the AFL.

After strong form in the 2016 pre-season, Gawn was added to Melbourne's leadership group. In the Round 3 match against North Melbourne at Blundstone Arena, he lined up against the 2015 All-Australian ruckman, Todd Goldstein; the contest drew high attention from the media, in which Gawn recorded 63 hitouts, the fourth-highest total for an AFL match at the time. His rise in the first half of the 2016 season led commentators to question whether he had become the best ruckman in the league and if he would be the All-Australian ruckman. In the Queen's Birthday game, Melbourne recorded a 46-point win against Collingwood at the Melbourne Cricket Ground; Gawn was awarded the Neale Daniher trophy as the best player on the ground, in which he recorded a career-best 27 disposals, along with three goals, six marks and 31 hitouts.

Apart from his tapwork, Gawn's ability to kick goals and take contested marks drew the attention of the media with many predicting he would be the All-Australian ruckman after his form continued in the second half of the season. In particular, his match in the twenty-nine-point win against Hawthorn in round twenty, where he recorded eight contested marks, which saw Hawthorn coach, Alastair Clarkson, note that "his second half was one of the best halves of footy by a ruckman [he'd] seen in a long time". Fox Sports Australia journalist, Tom Morris, noted in August that Gawn had achieved his goal of becoming the best ruckman in the competition set the previous November. His rapid rise saw him move from 295th at the start of the season to twelfth at the end of the home and away season in the AFL official player ratings. He played all matches for the season and finished with the most hitouts in the league with 928 and averaged 42.2 per game, he also broke the record for the most hit-outs to advantage in a season with 314.

Gawn was named in the AFL Media team of the week eight times, and his season was ultimately rewarded with selection in the 2016 All-Australian team as the ruckman. Furthermore, he was named in the AFL Media team of the year, the AFL Coaches Association team of the year and several commentators within the industry teams of the year, including Herald Sun head of football writer, Mark Robinson's; The Age journalist Rohan Connolly's; and former players, Jonathan Brown's and Cameron Mooney's. After heading into the best and fairest as the heavy favourite, he ultimately finished third behind Jack Viney and Nathan Jones, winning the Ron Barassi Senior Memorial Trophy in addition to the Norm Smith Memorial Trophy (coaches award) and James McDonald Trophy (heart and spirit award). He was recognised as one of the best players in the league by his peers when he finished equal-fourth in the Leigh Matthews Trophy for the AFL Players Association most valuable player alongside Eddie Betts of Adelaide. Furthermore, he was the highest-polling ruckman in the Brownlow Medal count and Melbourne's highest-polling player, scoring 16 votes.

=== 2017–2019: Injury and comeback ===
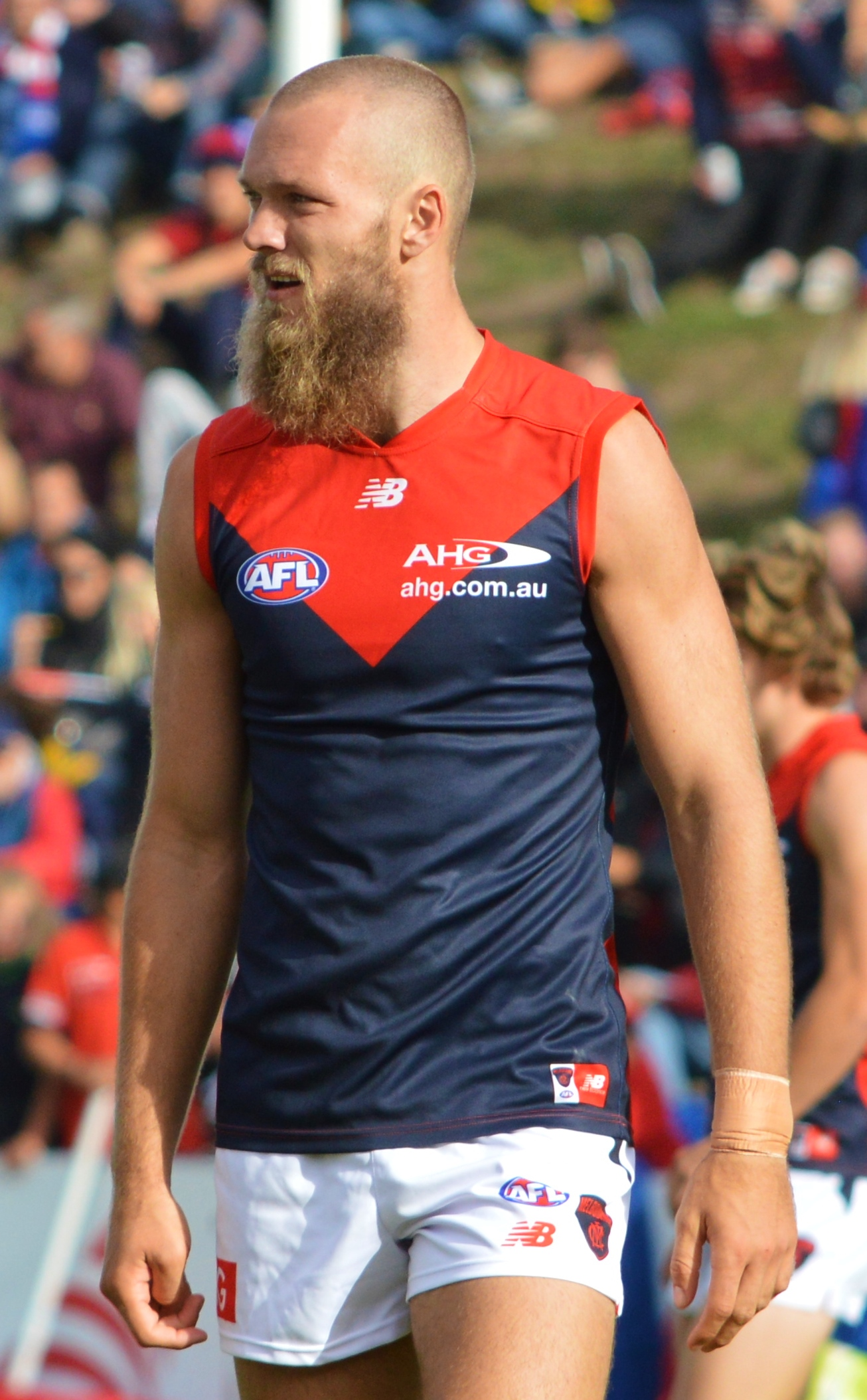
Max Gawn warming up prior to a pre-season game in February 2017

After Gawn's All-Australian year in 2016, external expectations on him were high, especially with the third-man ruck rule change—whereby only the two nominated ruckman were allowed to compete in the ruck—with Fox Footy personality and former player, David King, saying Gawn would relish in the rule change and "take his game to another level." Furthermore, he was named inside the top twenty players heading into the 2017 season by AFL Media and was touted as "undoubtedly one of the game’s finest and most influential players" by Fox Sports Australia's Riley Beveridge. His season was recognised internally too as he was retained in Melbourne's leadership group for the 2017 season.

In the opening round match against St Kilda at Etihad Stadium, Gawn recorded 49 hitouts and led Melbourne to the 30-point win, according to the Herald Sun's Lauren Wood. The Age journalist Rohan Connolly furthered this notion by saying Gawn's dominance over St Kilda ruckman Tom Hickey was crucial in the victory with his service leading to winning the clearance count. He was named in AFL Media's team of the week, and AFL Media's Nathan Schmook stated Gawn would have a dominant season based on his performance in the opening round. He played the first three matches of the year before sustaining a serious hamstring injury during the second quarter of the 29-point loss against Geelong at Etihad Stadium in Round 3; the injury required surgery and he was initially ruled out for 12 weeks. He ultimately missed ten weeks of football and returned directly to the AFL in the three-point win against West Coast at Domain Stadium in Round 14.

Following his return from injury, Gawn struggled to recapture his form from the previous season and early in the season, and by his own admission, he said that he wasn't back to the speed of the game due to his long-term injury. In addition, his form was further affected when his ruck technique was scrutinised by the field umpires during the twenty-four-point win against St Kilda at the Melbourne Cricket Ground in round twenty-one, in which he was giving away several free kicks for which "[Gawn] had never given away in [his] life" and he consequently conceded ruck contests so he wouldn't give away free kicks. After the head of umpiring, Hayden Kennedy, explained "if there is a straight arm by one of the players, when the other player is contesting the footy, that's when it becomes a free kick," Gawn was forced to adapt his ruck technique. He played every match following his return from injury to finish with thirteen matches and signed a contract extension in October, tying him to the club until the end of 2021.

He played every match in 2018, including three finals, to finish with 25 matches for the season; his season was rewarded with his first club best and fairest winning the Keith 'Bluey' Truscott Trophy with 657 votes.

In 2019, Gawn won his second consecutive best-and-fairest award (tying with teammate Clayton Oliver) and claimed his third All-Australian selection.

=== 2020–2023: Captaincy and premiership ===
Gawn was made captain of the Melbourne Football Club prior to the 2020 AFL season, a year where the Demons narrowly missed out on finals.

The 2021 season started well for Gawn's Demons, winning their first nine games and remaining on top of the ladder for most of the season. In the lead up to the 2021 finals series, Melbourne needed to defeat Geelong at their home ground. After trailing by as much as seven goals, Gawn led the comeback which culminated in a mark and shot at goal after the siren to give Melbourne the minor premiership for the first time since 1964. Following Gawn's victory over Geelong, he backed up his performance against the same opponent a few weeks later in the 2021 preliminary final, kicking a career-best five goals.

On 25 September 2021, Gawn captained Melbourne to its first AFL premiership in 57 years. The Grand Final win was marked by an extraordinary turn-around beginning with Caleb Daniel of the Western Bulldogs slamming Gawn into the hard turf of Optus Stadium. The dangerous act, which left Gawn uninjured, sparked a momentum shift which led the Demons to a huge 74-point victory. Gawn's leadership and ruck dominance resulted in him being named the All-Australian captain for 2021.

=== 2024–present: Late career and All-Australian record ===
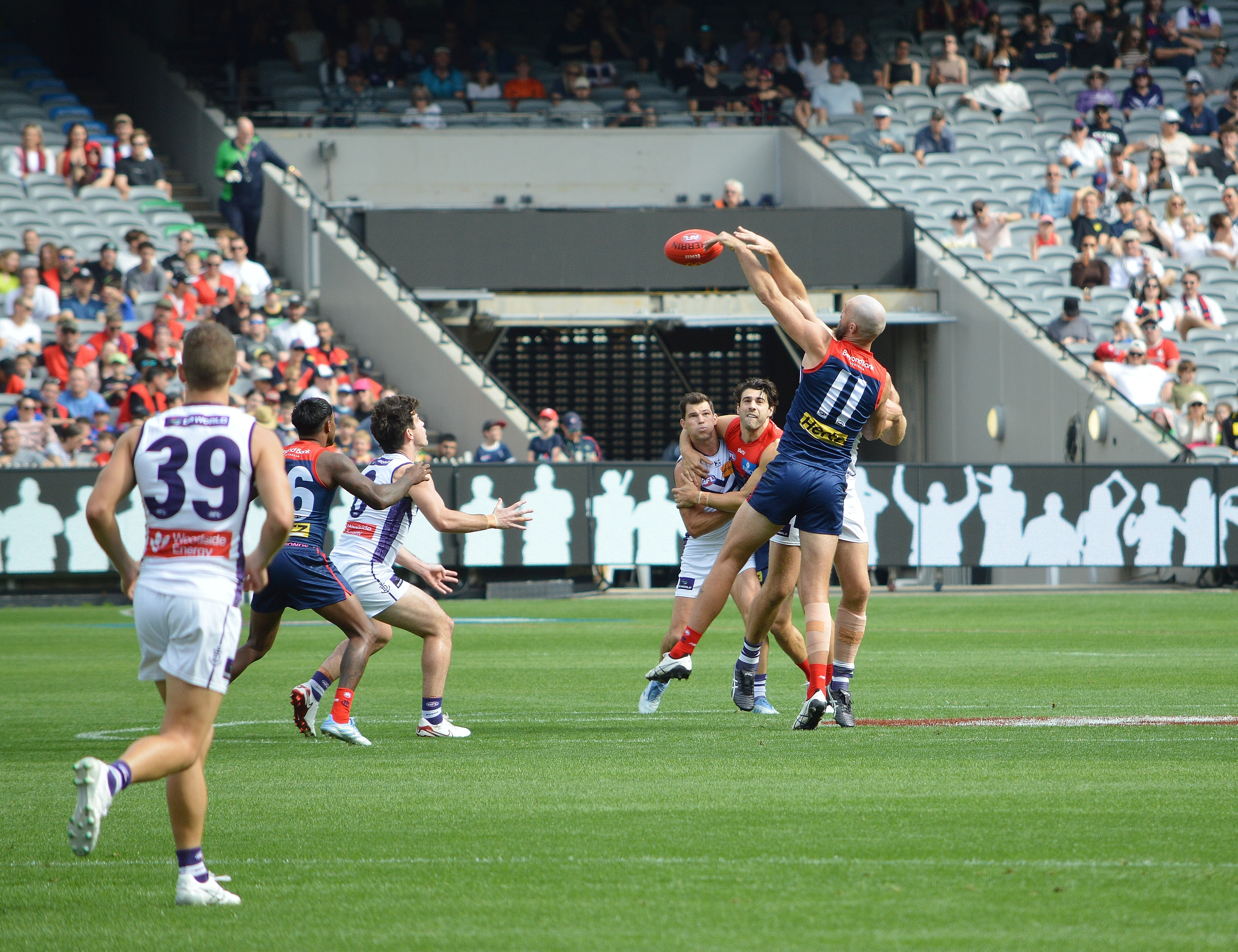
Gawn getting a hit out against Fremantle, 2025

Despite Melbourne not making finals for the first time since 2020, Gawn was named in the 2024 All-Australian team for the seventh time, the most by any ruckman in history as well as the most by any Mebourne player.

He returned to career-best form in 2025, winning his second Frank 'Checker' Hughes Medal against Richmond and collecting a personal-best 35 disposals against West Coast the following week. He was again named in the All-Australian team at the end of the season and won his third club best and fairest award.

Gawn's longevity and success initiated commentary about him being the greatest AFL ruckmen of all time, with former Essendon ruck Simon Madden noting that Gawn "is getting on, but he’s still playing great footy".

At the end of the 2026 season, Gawn was named in the All-Australian team for a record breaking ninth time and selected as All-Australian captain for the second time. He finished 4th in the Brownlow Medal with a career high 28 votes, surpassing Robert Flower's record for the most career Brownlow votes ever polled by a Melbourne player with 152 votes.

== Statistics ==
Updated to the end of round 22, 2026.

Legend
G	Goals	K	Kicks	D	Disposals	T	Tackles
B	Behinds	H	Handballs	M	Marks	H/O	Hit-outs

Season	Team	No.	Games	Totals								Averages (per game)								Votes
Season	Team	No.	Games	G	B	K	H	D	M	T	H/O	G	B	K	H	D	M	T	H/O	Votes
2010	Melbourne	37	0	—	—	—	—	—	—	—	—	—	—	—	—	—	—	—	—	0
2011	Melbourne	37	4	1	2	15	14	29	12	12	65	0.3	0.5	3.8	3.5	7.3	3.0	3.0	16.3	0
2012	Melbourne	37	0	—	—	—	—	—	—	—	—	—	—	—	—	—	—	—	—	0
2013	Melbourne	37	13	7	2	48	68	116	38	32	242	0.5	0.2	3.7	5.2	8.9	2.9	2.5	18.6	0
2014	Melbourne	37	9	4	5	39	56	95	38	11	133	0.4	0.6	4.3	6.2	10.6	4.2	1.2	14.8	0
2015	Melbourne	11	13	6	4	72	104	176	58	29	485	0.5	0.3	5.5	8.0	13.5	4.5	2.2	37.3	4
2016	Melbourne	11	22	16	11	154	164	318	91	80	928^{†}	0.7	0.5	7.0	7.5	14.5	4.1	3.6	42.2	16
2017	Melbourne	11	13	4	4	77	83	160	46	36	466	0.3	0.3	5.9	6.4	12.3	3.5	2.8	35.8	3
2018	Melbourne	11	25	13	12	204	192	396	113	57	1119^{†}	0.5	0.5	8.2	7.7	15.8	4.5	2.3	44.8^{†}	20
2019	Melbourne	11	21	7	7	253	119	372	102	51	829	0.3	0.3	12.0	5.7	17.7	4.9	2.4	39.5	17
2020 (Note: The 2020 season was played with 17 home-and-away matches per team (down from 22) and 16-minute quarters with time on (down from 20-minute quarters with time on) due to the impact of the COVID-19 pandemic.)	Melbourne	11	14	1	1	142	80	222	63	35	455	0.1	0.1	10.1	5.7	15.9	4.5	2.5	32.5	13
2021^{#}	Melbourne	11	25	16	17	316	147	463	131	71	805	0.6	0.7	12.6	5.9	18.5	5.2	2.8	32.2	16
2022	Melbourne	11	22	13	14	287	130	417	122	40	596	0.6	0.6	13.0	5.9	19.0	5.5	1.8	27.1	12
2023 (Note: 2023 statistics include one game in which Gawn was substituted out of the game due to injury (round 2) and was replaced by Jake Melksham.)	Melbourne	11	22	10	14	228	144	372	102	44	565	0.5	0.6	10.4	6.5	16.9	4.6	2.0	25.7	7
2024	Melbourne	11	21	11	9	235	166	401	110	54	713	0.5	0.4	11.2	7.9	19.1	5.2	2.6	34.0	13
2025	Melbourne	11	23	6	15	237	240	477	131	50	826	0.3	0.7	10.3	10.4	20.7	5.7	2.2	35.9	23
2026	Melbourne	11	21	12	9	221	225	446	94	39	677	0.6	0.4	10.5	10.7	21.2	4.5	1.9	32.2	28
Career			268	127	126	2528	1932	4460	1251	641	8904	0.5	0.5	9.4	7.2	16.6	4.7	2.4	33.2	172

== Honours and achievements ==
Team

- AFL premiership player (Melbourne): 2021 (c)
- AFL minor premiership: 2021
- McClelland Trophy (Melbourne): 2021 (c), 2023

Individual

- AFL premiership captain: 2021
- 2× Frank 'Checker' Hughes Medal: 2024, 2025
- Melbourne captain: 2020–
- AFLCA Champion Player of the Year Award: 2018
- 9× All-Australian team: 2016, 2018, 2019, 2020, 2021 (c), 2022, 2024, 2025, 2026 (c)
- 3x Keith 'Bluey' Truscott Trophy: 2018, 2019, 2025
- Neale Daniher Trophy: 2016
