= 1999 AFL season =

103rd season of the Australian Football League

1999 AFL premiership season
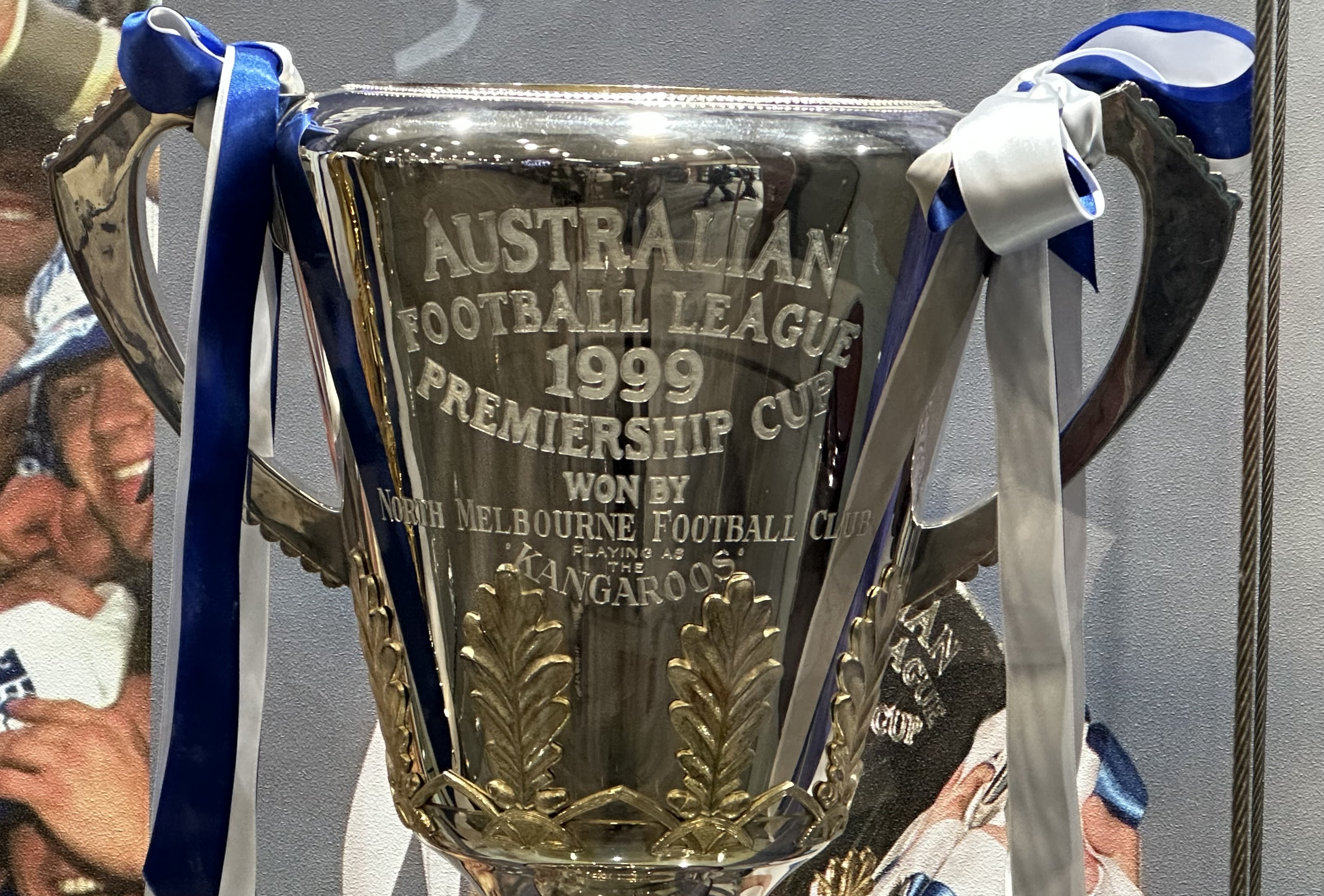

Overview
- Teams: 16
- Premiers: Kangaroos; 4th premiership
- Runners-up: Carlton; 8th runners-up result
- Minor premiers: Essendon; 15th minor premiership
- Brownlow Medallist: Shane Crawford (Hawthorn)
- Coleman Medallist: Scott Cummings (West Coast)

Attendance
- Matches played: 185
- Total attendance: 6,243,586 (33,749 per match)
- Highest (finals): 94,228 (grand final, Kangaroos v Carlton)

The 1999 AFL season was the 103rd season of the Australian Football League (AFL), the highest level senior Australian rules football competition in Australia, which was known as the Victorian Football League until 1989. The season featured sixteen clubs, ran from 25 March until 25 September, and comprised a 22-game home-and-away season followed by a finals series featuring the top eight clubs.

The premiership was won by the Kangaroos (North Melbourne) for the fourth time, after it defeated Carlton by 35 points in the 1999 AFL Grand Final.

== Ansett Australia Cup ==
Hawthorn defeated Port Adelaide 12.11 (83) to 5.6 (36).

== Home-and-away season ==
=== Round 1 ===
	Round 1
Thursday, 25 March (7:40 pm)	Essendon 16.14 (110)	def.	Carlton 9.17 (71)	Melbourne Cricket Ground (crowd: 71,501)	Statistics
Friday, 26 March (7:40 pm)	Geelong 22.9 (141)	def.	Kangaroos 21.9 (135)	Melbourne Cricket Ground (crowd: 33,674)	Statistics
Saturday, 27 March (2:10 pm)	Melbourne 14.20 (104)	def.	Richmond 13.9 (87)	Melbourne Cricket Ground (crowd: 47,620)	Statistics
Saturday, 27 March (7:10 pm)	Adelaide 12.6 (78)	def. by	Western Bulldogs 13.13 (91)	Football Park (crowd: 39,135)	Statistics
Saturday, 27 March (7:40 pm)	Brisbane Lions 23.14 (152)	def.	St Kilda 10.3 (63)	The Gabba (crowd: 20,172)	Statistics
Sunday, 28 March (2:10 pm)	Collingwood 8.11 (59)	def. by	Hawthorn 10.14 (74)	Melbourne Cricket Ground (crowd: 48,620)	Statistics
Sunday, 28 March (2:10 pm)	Sydney 12.14 (86)	def. by	Port Adelaide 17.13 (115)	Sydney Cricket Ground (crowd: 28,264)	Statistics
Sunday, 28 March (2:10 pm)	Fremantle 13.20 (98)	def. by	West Coast 15.12 (102)	Subiaco Oval (crowd: 32,680)	Statistics

=== Round 2 ===
Home team	Score	Away team	Score	Venue	Attendance	Date
Kangaroos	15.16 (106)	Essendon	22.9 (141)	MCG	48,383	Thursday, 1 April
Richmond	15.18 (108)	Sydney	13.18 (96)	MCG	40,462	Saturday, 3 April
Western Bulldogs	20.14 (134)	Geelong	24.11 (155)	Optus Oval	22,162	Saturday, 3 April
West Coast	11.17 (83)	Brisbane Lions	11.7 (73)	Subiaco Oval	29,932	Saturday, 3 April
Hawthorn	8.8 (56)	Adelaide	8.12 (60)	Waverley Park	29,135	Saturday, 3 April
Port Adelaide	17.12 (114)	Fremantle	15.11 (101)	Football Park	28,384	Sunday, 4 April
St Kilda	19.16 (130)	Melbourne	13.6 (84)	Waverley Park	37,232	Sunday, 4 April
Carlton	15.22 (112)	Collingwood	12.11 (83)	MCG	71,506	Monday, 5 April

=== Round 3 ===
Home team	Score	Away team	Score	Venue	Attendance	Date
Richmond	13.12 (90)	Kangaroos	15.10 (100)	MCG	46,173	Friday, 9 April
Essendon	22.17 (149)	Sydney	9.14 (68)	MCG	50,324	Saturday, 10 April
Geelong	14.13 (97)	Melbourne	12.19 (91)	Shell Stadium	27,417	Saturday, 10 April
Fremantle	11.12 (78)	Hawthorn	16.16 (112)	Subiaco Oval	22,552	Saturday, 10 April
Brisbane Lions	11.14 (80)	Port Adelaide	15.13 (103)	Gabba	21,092	Saturday, 10 April
Collingwood	11.9 (75)	West Coast	16.15 (111)	Victoria Park	19,441	Sunday, 11 April
Western Bulldogs	15.13 (103)	Carlton	15.15 (105)	Optus Oval	27,649	Sunday, 11 April
Adelaide	14.12 (96)	St Kilda	11.15 (81)	Football Park	41,708	Sunday, 11 April

=== Round 4 ===
Home team	Score	Away team	Score	Venue	Attendance	Date
Melbourne	12.13 (85)	Hawthorn	12.12 (84)	MCG	46,289	Friday, 16 April
Carlton	19.7 (121)	Fremantle	14.8 (92)	Optus Oval	19,100	Saturday, 17 April
Collingwood	14.12 (96)	Richmond	22.14 (146)	MCG	49,609	Saturday, 17 April
St Kilda	16.11 (107)	Western Bulldogs	15.9 (99)	Waverley Park	33,581	Saturday, 17 April
Brisbane Lions	17.13 (115)	Adelaide	8.6 (54)	Gabba	21,360	Saturday, 17 April
Sydney	10.12 (72)	Kangaroos	10.10 (70)	SCG	29,617	Saturday, 17 April
Port Adelaide	10.14 (74)	Geelong	17.13 (115)	Football Park	34,570	Sunday, 18 April
West Coast	15.7 (97)	Essendon	3.5 (23)	Subiaco Oval	32,893	Sunday, 18 April

=== Round 5 ===
Home team	Score	Away team	Score	Venue	Attendance	Date
Western Bulldogs	21.17 (143)	Richmond	12.9 (81)	MCG	43,043	Friday, 23 April
Carlton	9.11 (65)	Geelong	17.13 (115)	Optus Oval	31,189	Saturday, 24 April
Hawthorn	9.14 (68)	West Coast	14.10 (94)	Waverley Park	27,370	Saturday, 24 April
Melbourne	13.12 (90)	Port Adelaide	9.12 (66)	MCG	24,533	Saturday, 24 April
Kangaroos	14.8 (92)	St Kilda	13.12 (90)	SCG	11,706	Saturday, 24 April
Adelaide	23.17 (155)	Sydney	11.8 (74)	Football Park	42,641	Sunday, 25 April
Essendon	15.18 (108)	Collingwood	15.10 (100)	MCG	73,118	Sunday, 25 April
Fremantle	7.11 (53)	Brisbane Lions	15.18 (108)	Subiaco Oval	24,044	Sunday, 25 April

=== Round 6 ===
Home team	Score	Away team	Score	Venue	Attendance	Date
St Kilda	14.15 (99)	Carlton	7.16 (58)	MCG	43,777	Friday, 30 April
Geelong	14.14 (98)	Hawthorn	14.16 (100)	Shell Stadium	27,341	Saturday, 1 May
Richmond	11.12 (78)	Essendon	17.11 (113)	MCG	59,458	Saturday, 1 May
West Coast	18.16 (124)	Western Bulldogs	7.10 (52)	Subiaco Oval	32,370	Saturday, 1 May
Brisbane Lions	14.9 (93)	Melbourne	10.10 (70)	Gabba	21,753	Saturday, 1 May
Adelaide	18.7 (115)	Port Adelaide	12.15 (87)	Football Park	45,615	Sunday, 2 May
Collingwood	16.13 (109)	Kangaroos	21.11 (137)	MCG	38,245	Sunday, 2 May
Sydney	15.10 (100)	Fremantle	11.9 (75)	SCG	24,629	Sunday, 2 May

=== Round 7 ===
Home team	Score	Away team	Score	Venue	Attendance	Date
Carlton	18.10 (118)	Richmond	14.14 (98)	MCG	52,103	Friday, 7 May
Melbourne	20.14 (134)	Essendon	17.11 (113)	MCG	51,722	Saturday, 8 May
St Kilda	9.14 (68)	West Coast	7.6 (48)	Waverley Park	28,240	Saturday, 8 May
Brisbane Lions	13.18 (96)	Collingwood	9.8 (62)	Gabba	22,023	Saturday, 8 May
Port Adelaide	10.15 (75)	Western Bulldogs	18.12 (120)	Football Park	28,525	Saturday, 8 May
Fremantle	16.20 (116)	Geelong	15.9 (99)	Subiaco Oval	17,620	Sunday, 9 May
Kangaroos	22.9 (141)	Adelaide	12.13 (85)	MCG	22,006	Sunday, 9 May
Sydney	20.11 (131)	Hawthorn	16.7 (103)	SCG	25,823	Sunday, 9 May

=== Round 8 ===
Home team	Score	Away team	Score	Venue	Attendance	Date
Essendon	7.9 (51)	St Kilda	13.16 (94)	MCG	62,928	Friday, 14 May
Collingwood	14.15 (99)	Fremantle	8.11 (59)	MCG	26,339	Saturday, 15 May
Western Bulldogs	17.15 (117)	Melbourne	7.11 (53)	Optus Oval	18,226	Saturday, 15 May
Port Adelaide	19.11 (125)	Carlton	13.8 (86)	Football Park	30,557	Saturday, 15 May
Hawthorn	7.7 (49)	Kangaroos	15.11 (101)	Waverley Park	21,114	Saturday, 15 May
West Coast	19.12 (126)	Adelaide	11.6 (72)	Subiaco Oval	32,484	Sunday, 16 May
Geelong	14.16 (100)	Sydney	21.15 (141)	Shell Stadium	21,581	Sunday, 16 May
Richmond	21.9 (135)	Brisbane Lions	17.17 (119)	MCG	28,217	Sunday, 16 May

=== Round 9 ===
Home team	Score	Away team	Score	Venue	Attendance	Date
Collingwood	12.16 (88)	Western Bulldogs	19.12 (126)	MCG	44,457	Friday, 21 May
Carlton	15.7 (97)	Melbourne	9.10 (64)	Optus Oval	24,669	Saturday, 22 May
Hawthorn	7.5 (47)	Essendon	15.17 (107)	Waverley Park	46,479	Saturday, 22 May
Fremantle	12.14 (86)	Kangaroos	17.14 (116)	Subiaco Oval	24,218	Saturday, 22 May
Adelaide	9.13 (67)	Richmond	12.6 (78)	Football Park	38,151	Saturday, 22 May
St Kilda	18.11 (119)	Port Adelaide	7.15 (57)	Waverley Park	22,232	Sunday, 23 May
Brisbane Lions	22.12 (144)	Geelong	11.21 (87)	Gabba	22,948	Sunday, 23 May
Sydney	11.15 (81)	West Coast	14.10 (94)	SCG	36,787	Sunday, 23 May

=== Round 10 ===
Home team	Score	Away team	Score	Venue	Attendance	Date
Melbourne	13.12 (90)	Fremantle	22.12 (144)	MCG	19,178	Friday, 4 June
Adelaide	8.13 (61)	Essendon	16.13 (109)	Football Park	39,389	Friday, 4 June
Geelong	16.12 (108)	St Kilda	18.10 (118)	Shell Stadium	22,906	Saturday, 5 June
Richmond	11.15 (81)	Hawthorn	12.15 (87)	MCG	45,382	Saturday, 5 June
Brisbane Lions	6.8 (44)	Western Bulldogs	9.12 (66)	Gabba	17,665	Saturday, 5 June
West Coast	12.12 (84)	Carlton	15.11 (101)	Subiaco Oval	33,313	Sunday, 6 June
Kangaroos	20.13 (133)	Port Adelaide	18.18 (126)	MCG	16,429	Sunday, 6 June
Sydney	22.13 (145)	Collingwood	14.10 (94)	SCG	41,280	Sunday, 6 June

Note: Tony Lockett kicked 9 Goals To break VFL/AFL All Time Goals Record by Player

=== Round 11 ===
Home team	Score	Away team	Score	Venue	Attendance	Date
Essendon	21.11 (137)	Geelong	15.14 (104)	MCG	61,783	Friday, 11 June
Carlton	12.6 (78)	Brisbane Lions	13.16 (94)	Optus Oval	24,235	Saturday, 12 June
St Kilda	10.13 (73)	Sydney	15.12 (102)	Waverley Park	46,880	Saturday, 12 June
Port Adelaide	4.8 (32)	Richmond	3.12 (30)	Football Park	25,753	Saturday, 12 June
Western Bulldogs	10.16 (76)	Hawthorn	11.10 (76)	Optus Oval	18,977	Sunday, 13 June
Fremantle	18.14 (122)	Adelaide	12.11 (83)	Subiaco Oval	23,814	Sunday, 13 June
Collingwood	11.12 (78)	Melbourne	13.11 (89)	MCG	40,031	Monday, 14 June
Kangaroos	12.12 (84)	West Coast	9.10 (64)	SCG	15,230	Monday, 14 June

=== Round 12 ===
Home team	Score	Away team	Score	Venue	Attendance	Date
Richmond	15.11 (101)	Geelong	9.12 (66)	MCG	36,013	Friday, 18 June
Hawthorn	17.7 (109)	St Kilda	14.12 (96)	Waverley Park	36,381	Saturday, 19 June
Western Bulldogs	17.13 (115)	Fremantle	11.13 (79)	Optus Oval	13,513	Saturday, 19 June
Brisbane Lions	9.17 (71)	Essendon	13.11 (89)	Gabba	24,989	Saturday, 19 June
Adelaide	14.15 (99)	Collingwood	14.10 (94)	Football Park	36,737	Saturday, 19 June
Carlton	8.13 (61)	Sydney	12.16 (88)	Optus Oval	26,006	Sunday, 20 June
Melbourne	14.8 (92)	Kangaroos	12.21 (93)	MCG	28,350	Sunday, 20 June
West Coast	21.11 (137)	Port Adelaide	11.6 (72)	Subiaco Oval	32,596	Sunday, 20 June

=== Round 13 ===
Home team	Score	Away team	Score	Venue	Attendance	Date
Essendon	10.20 (80)	Western Bulldogs	11.10 (76)	MCG	55,230	Friday, 25 June
Geelong	9.14 (68)	West Coast	16.16 (112)	Shell Stadium	19,093	Saturday, 26 June
St Kilda	11.16 (82)	Collingwood	15.13 (103)	Waverley Park	40,790	Saturday, 26 June
Port Adelaide	8.17 (65)	Hawthorn	6.9 (45)	Football Park	28,739	Saturday, 26 June
Kangaroos	13.11 (89)	Carlton	8.5 (53)	MCG	36,558	Saturday, 26 June
Fremantle	19.12 (126)	Richmond	19.13 (127)	Subiaco Oval	22,865	Sunday, 27 June
Melbourne	16.13 (109)	Adelaide	13.13 (91)	MCG	23,371	Sunday, 27 June
Sydney	15.8 (98)	Brisbane Lions	20.13 (133)	SCG	25,528	Sunday, 27 June

=== Round 14 ===
Home team	Score	Away team	Score	Venue	Attendance	Date
Collingwood	13.9 (87)	Port Adelaide	12.16 (88)	MCG	29,462	Friday, 2 July
Kangaroos	15.12 (102)	Brisbane Lions	15.10 (100)	MCG	24,189	Saturday, 3 July
St Kilda	13.18 (96)	Richmond	8.7 (55)	Waverley Park	43,614	Saturday, 3 July
West Coast	16.16 (112)	Melbourne	11.11 (77)	Subiaco Oval	33,541	Saturday, 3 July
Essendon	16.12 (108)	Fremantle	10.12 (72)	MCG	35,273	Sunday, 4 July
Hawthorn	7.13 (55)	Carlton	13.11 (89)	Waverley Park	48,353	Sunday, 4 July
Adelaide	25.9 (159)	Geelong	14.12 (96)	Football Park	40,209	Sunday, 4 July
Sydney	14.17 (101)	Western Bulldogs	18.15 (123)	SCG	28,420	Sunday, 4 July

=== Round 15 ===
Home team	Score	Away team	Score	Venue	Attendance	Date
Richmond	16.8 (104)	West Coast	11.9 (75)	MCG	32,564	Friday, 9 July
Carlton	20.16 (136)	Adelaide	13.10 (88)	Optus Oval	22,720	Saturday, 10 July
Geelong	19.14 (128)	Collingwood	19.11 (125)	Shell Stadium	24,395	Saturday, 10 July
Melbourne	10.14 (74)	Sydney	18.17 (125)	MCG	35,500	Saturday, 10 July
Fremantle	16.11 (107)	St Kilda	12.12 (84)	Subiaco Oval	24,411	Saturday, 10 July
Brisbane Lions	13.14 (92)	Hawthorn	9.7 (61)	Gabba	22,758	Saturday, 10 July
Port Adelaide	14.15 (99)	Essendon	9.8 (62)	Football Park	34,671	Sunday, 11 July
Western Bulldogs	23.12 (150)	Kangaroos	16.12 (108)	MCG	44,683	Sunday, 11 July

=== Round 16 ===
Home team	Score	Away team	Score	Venue	Attendance	Date
Richmond	15.17 (107)	Melbourne	13.4 (82)	MCG	44,898	Friday, 16 July
St Kilda	10.8 (68)	Brisbane Lions	16.11 (107)	Waverley Park	22,268	Saturday, 17 July
Western Bulldogs	14.15 (99)	Adelaide	14.13 (97)	MCG	27,747	Saturday, 17 July
Kangaroos	22.11 (143)	Geelong	13.10 (88)	SCG	10,676	Saturday, 17 July
Port Adelaide	10.12 (72)	Sydney	9.10 (64)	Football Park	30,750	Sunday, 18 July
Carlton	9.16 (70)	Essendon	23.8 (146)	MCG	66,207	Sunday, 18 July
Hawthorn	14.8 (92)	Collingwood	18.16 (124)	Waverley Park	40,319	Sunday, 18 July
West Coast	11.6 (72)	Fremantle	17.17 (119)	Subiaco Oval	36,763	Sunday, 18 July

=== Round 17 ===
Home team	Score	Away team	Score	Venue	Attendance	Date
Melbourne	11.13 (79)	St Kilda	14.14 (98)	MCG	28,854	Friday, 23 July
Essendon	24.14 (158)	Kangaroos	20.12 (132)	MCG	68,831	Saturday, 24 July
Geelong	13.13 (91)	Western Bulldogs	14.14 (98)	Shell Stadium	19,951	Saturday, 24 July
Sydney	14.12 (96)	Richmond	8.7 (55)	SCG	29,507	Saturday, 24 July
Fremantle	13.11 (89)	Port Adelaide	14.12 (96)	WACA	22,987	Saturday, 24 July
Adelaide	18.17 (125)	Hawthorn	11.10 (76)	Football Park	38,679	Sunday, 25 July
Brisbane Lions	25.16 (166)	West Coast	9.12 (66)	Gabba	22,186	Sunday, 25 July
Collingwood	14.12 (96)	Carlton	23.15 (153)	MCG	53,560	Sunday, 25 July

=== Round 18 ===
Home team	Score	Away team	Score	Venue	Attendance	Date
Kangaroos	15.11 (101)	Richmond	11.13 (79)	MCG	38,196	Friday, 30 July
Melbourne	12.8 (80)	Geelong	15.11 (101)	MCG	27,408	Saturday, 31 July
St Kilda	9.12 (66)	Adelaide	15.9 (99)	Waverley Park	20,131	Saturday, 31 July
Sydney	11.13 (79)	Essendon	15.3 (93)	SCG	31,776	Saturday, 31 July
West Coast	16.12 (108)	Collingwood	10.12 (72)	WACA	26,126	Saturday, 31 July
Port Adelaide	9.12 (66)	Brisbane Lions	17.16 (118)	Football Park	33,345	Sunday, 1 August
Carlton	14.15 (99)	Western Bulldogs	14.10 (94)	Optus Oval	24,483	Sunday, 1 August
Hawthorn	15.12 (102)	Fremantle	9.23 (77)	Waverley Park	13,941	Sunday, 1 August

=== Round 19 ===
Home team	Score	Away team	Score	Venue	Attendance	Date
Essendon	23.15 (153)	West Coast	15.3 (93)	MCG	55,096	Friday, 6 August
Geelong	18.10 (118)	Port Adelaide	12.14 (86)	Shell Stadium	17,234	Saturday, 7 August
Richmond	10.19 (79)	Collingwood	16.16 (112)	MCG	47,621	Saturday, 7 August
Kangaroos	17.9 (111)	Sydney	15.11 (101)	SCG	27,964	Saturday, 7 August
Fremantle	8.9 (57)	Carlton	19.12 (126)	WACA	23,372	Saturday, 7 August
Adelaide	6.8 (44)	Brisbane Lions	11.17 (83)	Football Park	33,398	Sunday, 8 August
Hawthorn	18.14 (122)	Melbourne	8.6 (54)	Waverley Park	16,665	Sunday, 8 August
Western Bulldogs	18.7 (115)	St Kilda	13.13 (91)	Optus Oval	15,804	Sunday, 8 August

=== Round 20 ===
Home team	Score	Away team	Score	Venue	Attendance	Date
Collingwood	10.5 (65)	Essendon	12.15 (87)	MCG	56,129	Friday, 13 August
Richmond	12.7 (79)	Western Bulldogs	17.13 (115)	MCG	31,062	Saturday, 14 August
St Kilda	13.11 (89)	Kangaroos	16.18 (114)	Waverley Park	26,261	Saturday, 14 August
Port Adelaide	8.15 (63)	Melbourne	6.10 (46)	Football Park	26,000	Saturday, 14 August
West Coast	11.16 (82)	Hawthorn	12.12 (84)	WACA	24,835	Saturday, 14 August
Brisbane Lions	28.13 (181)	Fremantle	9.13 (67)	Gabba	23,845	Sunday, 15 August
Geelong	17.11 (113)	Carlton	15.14 (104)	MCG	42,272	Sunday, 15 August
Sydney	25.9 (159)	Adelaide	5.11 (41)	SCG	34,299	Sunday, 15 August

=== Round 21 ===
Home team	Score	Away team	Score	Venue	Attendance	Date
Essendon	22.15 (147)	Richmond	13.11 (89)	MCG	48,835	Friday, 20 August
Carlton	15.16 (106)	St Kilda	7.3 (45)	Optus Oval	24,185	Saturday, 21 August
Melbourne	15.14 (104)	Brisbane Lions	25.9 (159)	MCG	18,679	Saturday, 21 August
Hawthorn	15.13 (103)	Geelong	15.11 (101)	Waverley Park	31,603	Saturday, 21 August
Fremantle	10.16 (76)	Sydney	15.19 (109)	WACA	25,126	Saturday, 21 August
Port Adelaide	13.14 (92)	Adelaide	9.14 (68)	Football Park	42,669	Sunday, 22 August
Kangaroos	16.17 (113)	Collingwood	15.10 (100)	MCG	33,449	Sunday, 22 August
Western Bulldogs	16.10 (106)	West Coast	16.8 (104)	Optus Oval	17,267	Sunday, 22 August

=== Round 22 ===
Home team	Score	Away team	Score	Venue	Attendance	Date
Richmond	13.12 (90)	Carlton	11.13 (79)	MCG	34,013	Friday, 27 August
Essendon	17.14 (116)	Melbourne	15.9 (99)	MCG	47,480	Saturday, 28 August
Western Bulldogs	22.13 (145)	Port Adelaide	11.12 (78)	Optus Oval	15,183	Saturday, 28 August
Collingwood	8.4 (52)	Brisbane Lions	13.16 (94)	Victoria Park	24,493	Saturday, 28 August
West Coast	12.8 (80)	St Kilda	18.13 (121)	WACA Ground	24,696	Saturday, 28 August
Adelaide	8.18 (66)	Kangaroos	22.10 (142)	Football Park	37,662	Sunday, 29 August
Geelong	21.13 (139)	Fremantle	13.10 (88)	Shell Stadium	17,378	Sunday, 29 August
Hawthorn	23.15 (153)	Sydney	11.2 (68)	Waverley Park	72,130	Sunday, 29 August

== Ladder ==
(P)	Premiers
	Qualified for finals

#	Team	P	W	L	D	PF	PA	%	Pts
1	Essendon	22	18	4	0	2400	1905	126.0	72
2	Kangaroos (P)	22	17	5	0	2463	2129	115.7	68
3	Brisbane Lions	22	16	6	0	2422	1671	144.9	64
4	Western Bulldogs	22	15	6	1	2363	1993	118.6	62
5	West Coast	22	12	10	0	2068	1937	106.8	48
6	Carlton	22	12	10	0	2088	2028	103.0	48
7	Port Adelaide	22	12	10	0	1851	2054	90.1	48
8	Sydney	22	11	11	0	2184	2128	102.6	44
9	Hawthorn	22	10	11	1	1858	1943	95.6	42
10	St Kilda	22	10	12	0	1978	2021	97.9	40
11	Geelong	22	10	12	0	2328	2454	94.9	40
12	Richmond	22	9	13	0	1977	2170	91.1	36
13	Adelaide	22	8	14	0	1903	2232	85.3	32
14	Melbourne	22	6	16	0	1850	2293	80.7	24
15	Fremantle	22	5	17	0	1981	2403	82.4	20
16	Collingwood	22	4	18	0	1973	2326	84.8	16

Rules for classification: 1. premiership points; 2. percentage; 3. points for
Average score: 95.7
Source: AFL Tables

== Progression by round ==
Numbers highlighted in green indicate that the team finished the round inside the top 8.
Numbers highlighted in blue indicates the team finished first on the ladder in that round.
Numbers highlighted in red indicates the team finished in last place on the ladder in that round.

Team ╲ Round	1	2	3	4	5	6	7	8	9	10	11	12	13	14	15	16	17	18	19	20	21	22
Essendon	4	8	12	12	16	20	20	20	24	28	32	36	40	44	44	48	52	56	60	64	68	72
Kangaroos	0	0	4	4	8	12	16	20	24	28	32	36	40	44	44	48	48	52	56	60	64	68
Brisbane Lions	4	4	4	8	12	16	20	20	24	24	28	28	32	32	36	40	44	48	52	56	60	64
Western Bulldogs	4	4	4	4	8	8	12	16	20	24	26	30	30	34	38	42	46	46	50	54	58	62
West Coast	4	8	12	16	20	24	24	28	32	32	32	36	40	44	44	44	44	48	48	48	48	48
Carlton	0	4	8	12	12	12	16	16	20	24	24	24	24	28	32	32	36	40	44	44	48	48
Port Adelaide	4	8	12	12	12	12	12	16	16	16	20	20	24	28	32	36	40	40	40	44	48	48
Sydney	0	0	0	4	4	8	12	16	16	20	24	28	28	28	32	32	36	36	36	40	44	44
Hawthorn	4	4	8	8	8	12	12	12	12	16	18	22	22	22	22	22	22	26	30	34	38	42
St Kilda	0	4	4	8	8	12	16	20	24	28	28	28	28	32	32	32	36	36	36	36	36	40
Geelong	4	8	12	16	20	20	20	20	20	20	20	20	20	20	24	24	24	28	32	36	36	40
Richmond	0	4	4	8	8	8	8	12	16	16	16	20	24	24	28	32	32	32	32	32	32	36
Adelaide	0	4	8	8	12	16	16	16	16	16	16	20	20	24	24	24	28	32	32	32	32	32
Melbourne	4	4	4	8	12	12	16	16	16	16	20	20	24	24	24	24	24	24	24	24	24	24
Fremantle	0	0	0	0	0	0	4	4	4	8	12	12	12	12	16	20	20	20	20	20	20	20
Collingwood	0	0	0	0	0	0	0	4	4	4	4	4	8	8	8	12	12	12	16	16	16	16

== Finals series ==
=== Qualifying finals ===
Home team	Score	Away team	Score	Venue	Attendance	Date
Western Bulldogs	8.12 (60)	West Coast	9.11 (65)	MCG	41,227	Friday, 3 September
Kangaroos	15.10 (100)	Port Adelaide	8.8 (56)	MCG	31,476	Saturday, 4 September
Brisbane Lions	20.18 (138)	Carlton	8.17 (65)	Gabba	26,112	Saturday, 4 September
Essendon	18.15 (123)	Sydney	7.12 (54)	MCG	57,687	Sunday, 5 September

=== Semi-finals ===
Home team	Score	Away team	Score	Venue	Attendance	Date
West Coast	10.10 (70)	Carlton	18.16 (124)	MCG	55,682	Saturday, 11 September
Brisbane Lions	19.12 (126)	Western Bulldogs	10.13 (73)	Gabba	24,045	Saturday, 11 September

Note: West Coast Eagles played its "home" final at the MCG despite being ranked above Carlton due to the agreement then in place with the Melbourne Cricket Club that at least one game each week of the finals be played at the MCG.

=== Preliminary finals ===
Home team	Score	Away team	Score	Venue	Attendance	Date
Kangaroos	19.9 (123)	Brisbane Lions	11.12 (78)	MCG	61,031	Friday, 17 September
Essendon	14.19 (103)	Carlton	16.8 (104)	MCG	80,519	Saturday, 18 September

=== Grand final ===
Home team	Score	Away team	Score	Venue	Attendance	Date
Kangaroos	19.10 (124)	Carlton	12.17 (89)	MCG	94,228	Saturday, 25 September

== Match attendance ==
Team	Hosted	Average	Highest	Lowest	Total	Last season	±
Essendon	11	57,309	73,118	35,273	630,399	54,894	+ 2414
Richmond	11	40,533	59,458	28,217	445,863	44,307	3774
Adelaide	11	39,393	45,615	33,398	433,324	41,245	1852
Collingwood	11	39,126	56,129	19,441	430,386	49,399	10,273
Carlton	11	35,037	70,506	19,100	385,403	32,634	+ 2403
Hawthorn	11	34,863	72,130	13,941	383,490	32,173	+ 2690
St Kilda	11	33,182	46,880	20,131	365,006	36,231	3049
Melbourne	11	31,955	51,722	18,679	351,504	40,085	8130
Port Adelaide	11	31,269	42,669	25,753	343,963	31,799	530
West Coast Eagles	11	30,868	36,763	24,696	339,549	34,199	3331
Sydney	11	30,539	41,280	24,629	335,930	31,549	1010
Kangaroos	11	25,890	48,383	10,676	284,786	35,791	9901
Geelong	11	24,840	42,272	17,234	273,242	28,371	3531
Western Bulldogs	11	24,023	44,683	13,513	264,254	23,832	+ 191
Fremantle	11	23,972	32,680	17,620	263,689	23,104	+ 868
Brisbane Lions	11	21,890	24,989	17,665	240,791	16,675	+ 5215
Totals	176	32,793	73,118	10,676	5,771,579	34,768	1975

Venue	Hosted	Average	Highest	Lowest	Total	Last year	±
MCG	58	42,370	73,118	16,429	2,457,440	47,585	5215
Football Park	22	35,331	45,615	25,753	777,287	36,522	1191
Waverley Park	21	33,558	72,130	13,941	704,719	34,549	991
Subiaco Oval	16	28,506	36,763	17,620	456,096	29,800	1294
SCG	15	26,767	41,280	10,676	401,506	31,549	4782
WACA	6	24,524	26,126	22,987	147,142	25,590	1066
Victoria Park	2	21,967	24,493	19,441	43,934	23,241	1274
Shell Stadium	9	21,922	27,417	17,234	197,296	23,307	1385
GABBA	11	21,890	24,989	17,665	240,791	16,675	+ 5215
Optus Oval	16	21,586	31,189	13,513	345,368	21,874	289
Totals	176	32,793	73,118	10,676	5,771,579	34,768	1975

== Awards ==
- The Brownlow Medal was awarded to Shane Crawford of Hawthorn.
- The Leigh Matthews Trophy as the AFL's most valuable player was awarded to Shane Crawford of Hawthorn.
- The Coleman Medal was awarded to Scott Cummings of the West Coast Eagles.
- The Norm Smith Medal was awarded to Shannon Grant of the Kangaroos
- The AFL Rising Star award was awarded to Adam Goodes of the Sydney Swans.
- The wooden Spoon was "awarded" to Collingwood.
- The reserves Grand Final was won by Essendon against St Kilda, before the competition was merged with the Victorian Football League.

== See also ==
- List of AFL debuts in 1999

== Notes ==
- Richmond and Adelaide played in torrential and stormy conditions at Football Park in Round 9. Under new laws that were introduced following the power outage which interrupted a game at Waverley Park in 1996, the captains met in the centre to decide whether to call the game off at three quarter time (accepting the progress score as final), due to the thunder and lightning having put out two light towers during half time. At that stage, Adelaide led by a point, but the captains agreed to carry on with the game. Richmond ended up winning by 11 points.
- Two rounds later, Richmond once again played in heavy and unrelenting rain at Football Park, this time against Port Adelaide. Port Adelaide won by the score of 4.8 (32) to 3.12 (30). It was Port Adelaide's lowest score, and remained as such until 2010, giving them the unique distinction during that period of time of having recorded a victory with their lowest score.
- In round 10, Sydney's Tony Lockett kicked his 1300th career goal, breaking Gordon Coventry's 62-year standing record of 1299 career goals. Lockett still holds the record as of 2026.
- Brisbane's half-time score of 21.5 (131) against Fremantle in round 20 set the new and enduring record for the highest half-time score in VFL/AFL history.
- In their Round 12 game, Hawthorn trailed St Kilda by 63 points early in the second quarter before recovering to win by thirteen points. This set a new record for the largest ever comeback in a VFL/AFL game, a record which would stand until 2001.
- The start of the Round 22 game between Richmond and Carlton at the Melbourne Cricket Ground was delayed by about half an hour after the scoreboard at the city end caught fire ten minutes before the scheduled bounce down. Players returned to the rooms, and much of the Ponsford Stand was evacuated onto the playing arena.
- Collingwood lost 13 games in a row following on from the end of the previous season. They finally won against Fremantle in Round 8.
- Port Adelaide's percentage of 90.12 remains the worst of any team in VFL/AFL history which qualified a team for the finals (excluding the seasons affected by World War I).
- Waverley Park and Victoria Park both hosted their last senior AFL games in Round 22 – their absence would be replaced the following year by Docklands Stadium.

== Sources ==
- 1999 AFL season at AFL Tables
- 1999 AFL season at Australian Football
