= Scott Cummings (footballer) =

Australian rules footballer, born 1974

Personal information
- Full name: Scott Cameron Cummings
- Born: 18 January 1974 (age 52); Western Australia
- Original team: Swan Districts (WAFL)
- Debut: Round 14, 26 June 1994, Essendon vs. Sydney, at Melbourne Cricket Ground
- Height: 194 cm (6 ft 4 in)
- Weight: 115 kg (254 lb)

Playing career^{1}
Years	Club	Games (Goals)
1994–1996	Essendon	40 (83)
1997–1998	Port Adelaide	37 (102)
1999–2001	West Coast Eagles	46 (158)
2002	Collingwood	5 (6)
Total		128 (349)
- ^{1} Playing statistics correct to the end of 2002.

Career highlights
- Coleman Medal 1999; Essendon leading goalkicker 1994; Port Adelaide leading goalkicker 1997; West Coast Eagles leading goalkicker 1999; Glendinning–Allan Medal 2000; AFL Rising Star nominee 1994; Graham Moss Medal 1997

Scott Cameron Cummings (born 18 January 1974) is a former Australian rules footballer who played for Essendon, Port Adelaide, the West Coast Eagles, and Collingwood in the Australian Football League.

Cummings played primarily as a full forward and won the Coleman Medal in 1999 for being the leading goalscorer for the season. Although he was well renowned for his goal kicking abilities, Cummings occasionally played centre half back while playing in the reserve team at Essendon.

== AFL career ==
Cummings was selected at pick #20 in the 1992 AFL draft from Swan Districts in the West Australian Football League as a strong full forward. Essendon originally received this pick after trading Richard Ambrose, Ed Considine and Michael Werner for it.

=== Essendon career (1994–1996) ===
Cummings made his AFL debut in 1994 against Sydney, kicking eight goals and earning himself an AFL Rising Star nomination. Cummings went on to kick 32 goals in his 10 matches for the year and was the leading goalkicker for Essendon. Despite a strong start to his career, Cummings' performance throughout 1995 and 1996 was inconsistent, in part as a result of being played out of position. As a full-forward, he was still capable of strong performances, such as his game against Footscray in Round 8, 1996 where he kicked eight goals.

At the end of the 1996 season, Essendon traded Cummings to Port Adelaide in return for their #2 (Chris Heffernan) and #28 (Jason Johnson) draft selections. In all, Cummings played 40 games for Essendon, kicking 83 goals.

=== Port Adelaide career (1997–1998) ===
Cummings kicked 70 goals in his first season for Port Adelaide and finished third in the Coleman Medal behind Tony Modra (84) and Saverio Rocca (76). His season included three games in which he kicked five goals. In Round 17 against Essendon he kicked seven goals. Poor form and suspension saw him play only 16 games in 1998 for a return of 32 goals. At the end of the year, he was traded to West Coast in return for Jarrad Schofield.

=== West Coast Eagles career (1999–2001) ===
Working on his strength and fitness, Cummings' first season for West Coast proved to be his career best. He kicked 95 goals for the 1999 season and won the Coleman Medal for leading goalkicker. This included four hauls of seven goals. In 2000, Cummings started where he left off, kicking five goals in Round 1 before kicking 14 goals against Adelaide in Round 4. A fortnight later, Cummings kicked 10 goals in the 'Western Derby' against Fremantle and by Round 8, he was on top of the goalkickers list with 39 goals. However, quadriceps and groin injuries curtailed his season and he played only a single game in the second half of the season. His form tapered dramatically in 2001, kicking only 16 goals from nine games. At the end of the season Cummings was delisted by West Coast.

=== Collingwood career (2002) ===
Late in 2001 Cummings' former coach Mick Malthouse, who had since moved to Collingwood, selected him in the 2002 Pre-Season draft. Despite a promising start to the 2002 season, kicking 5 goals in Round 1, Cummings again struggled with injuries. He played only five games for Collingwood, before retiring at the age of 28.

== Statistics ==
Legend
G	Goals	K	Kicks	D	Disposals	T	Tackles
B	Behinds	H	Handballs	M	Marks

Led the league for the season only
Led the league after finals only
Led the league after season and finals

Season	Team	No.	Games	Totals							Averages (per game)						
Season	Team	No.	Games	G	B	K	H	D	M	T	G	B	K	H	D	M	T
1994	Essendon	36	10	32	17	60	12	72	37	7	3.2	1.7	6.0	1.2	7.2	3.7	0.7
1995	Essendon	36	15	13	7	111	41	152	51	12	0.9	0.5	7.4	2.7	10.1	3.4	0.8
1996	Essendon	36	15	38	23	96	28	124	55	11	2.5	1.5	6.4	1.9	8.3	3.7	0.7
1997	Port Adelaide	6	21	70	50	153	23	176	89	12	3.3	2.4	7.3	1.1	8.4	4.2	0.6
1998	Port Adelaide	6	16	32	18	70	24	94	43	9	2.0	1.1	4.4	1.5	5.9	2.7	0.6
1999	West Coast	14	24	95	42	173	37	210	123	20	4.0	1.8	7.2	1.5	8.8	5.1	0.8
2000	West Coast	14	13	47	17	75	17	92	53	9	3.6	1.3	5.8	1.3	7.1	4.1	0.7
2001	West Coast	14	9	16	4	26	9	35	16	10	1.8	0.4	2.9	1.0	3.9	1.8	1.1
2002	Collingwood	32	5	6	3	10	3	13	6	0	1.2	0.6	2.0	0.6	2.6	1.2	0.0
Career			128	349	181	774	194	968	473	90	2.7	1.4	6.0	1.5	7.6	3.7	0.7

== After retirement ==
Since retiring, Cummings has played football in many EJ Whitten Legends Matches since 2003. Cummings has developed a career in the media, presenting on SEN 1116's Ralphy, Serge and the Big Man in 2004 and 2005. In 2006 Cummings worked as a boundary rider for Fox Footy Channel. In 2008 he commenced as business development manager for engineering firm Robert Bird Group, in their Melbourne office. Cummings continues to be involved with the Collingwood Football Club, occasionally working as a master of ceremonies for club events. Cummings also worked with radio station 3AW until late 2019, when the station terminated his employment following inappropriate comments about sexual assault against women made on a podcast.
