= Jim Main =

Australian sports journalist (1943–2022)

Jim Main (12 March 1943 – 8 August 2022) was an Australian sports journalist and writer. He is known especially for his coverage of Australian rules football, especially his book More Than a Century of AFL Grand Finals (2001–2005), some editions of which he co-authored with Rohan Connolly.

He studied law at the University of Melbourne and later graduated from La Trobe University with a bachelor of arts degree. Main worked at the Melbourne Herald and later on London's Daily Express. He was later sports editor of The Australian for more than 10 years.

He covered several Commonwealth Games and Olympic Games and won a Walkley Award for his coverage of the 1970 Commonwealth Games in Edinburgh.

Main was inducted into the Melbourne Cricket Ground Media Hall of Fame in 2003.

He has published more than 60 books and has co-written books with David Allen, Eddie McGuire and Jim Stynes. He was also a notable supporter and historian of the Sydney Swans.
