= Graham Moss Medal =

Australian rules football award

The Graham Moss Medal is an Australian rules football award, presented to the best player on the ground for Western Australia in AFL representative State of Origin matches. It was awarded in each of the four State of Origin matches played by Western Australia from 1995 to 1998, and was most recently awarded in the revived 2026 AFL Origin match. The medal was named after champion Claremont and Essendon ruckman Graham Moss.

== Winners ==
- 1995 – Tony Evans
- 1996 – Derek Kickett
- 1997 – Scott Cummings
- 1998 – Peter Bell
- 2026 – Jesse Hogan

== See also ==
- Simpson Medal
