= Harley Balic =

Australian rules footballer (1997–2022)

Personal information
- Born: 5 January 1997
- Died: 9 January 2022 (aged 25)
- Original team: Sandringham Dragons (TAC Cup)
- Draft: No. 38, 2015 national draft
- Debut: Round 3, 2017, Fremantle vs. Western Bulldogs, at Domain Stadium
- Height: 187 cm (6 ft 2 in)
- Weight: 86 kg (190 lb)
- Position: Midfielder

Playing career^{1}
Years	Club	Games (Goals)
2016–2017	Fremantle	4 (3)
2018	Melbourne	0 (0)
- ^{1} Playing statistics correct to the end of 2017.

Harley Balic (5 January 1997 – 9 January 2022) was a professional Australian rules footballer who played for the Fremantle Football Club in the Australian Football League (AFL).

Balic was born in Sandringham and grew up in Mordialloc. His father Eddie was of Bosnian descent, and his mother Nancy was of Italian and German descent. Balic played for the Sandringham Dragons in the TAC Cup and was drafted by Fremantle with their second selection and 38th overall in the 2015 national draft. In 2016, he was a member of the Peel Thunder premiership team, collecting 20 disposals in the WAFL Grand Final.

Balic made his AFL debut in the sixteen-point win against the Western Bulldogs at Domain Stadium in round three of the 2017 season. After playing four games for the Dockers in 2017, he was placed on indefinite leave for "personal reasons". Later that year, Balic requested a trade home to Victoria and was traded to Melbourne in October. In August 2018 at the age of 21, Balic retired after losing passion for the game.

Balic died on 9 January 2022, four days after his 25th birthday. After his death, Balic's father indicated he had died due to a battle with drug addiction.

== Statistics ==
Statistics are correct to the end of the 2018 season

Legend
G	Goals	K	Kicks	D	Disposals	T	Tackles
B	Behinds	H	Handballs	M	Marks

Season	Team	No.	Games	Totals							Averages (per game)						
Season	Team	No.	Games	G	B	K	H	D	M	T	G	B	K	H	D	M	T
2016	Fremantle	24	0	—	—	—	—	—	—	—	—	—	—	—	—	—	—
2017	Fremantle	24	4	3	1	26	26	52	13	13	0.8	0.3	6.5	6.5	13.0	3.3	3.3
2018	Melbourne	27	0	—	—	—	—	—	—	—	—	—	—	—	—	—	—
Career			4	3	1	26	26	52	13	13	0.8	0.3	6.5	6.5	13.0	3.3	3.3
