= Jesse Hogan =

Australian rules footballer (born 1995)

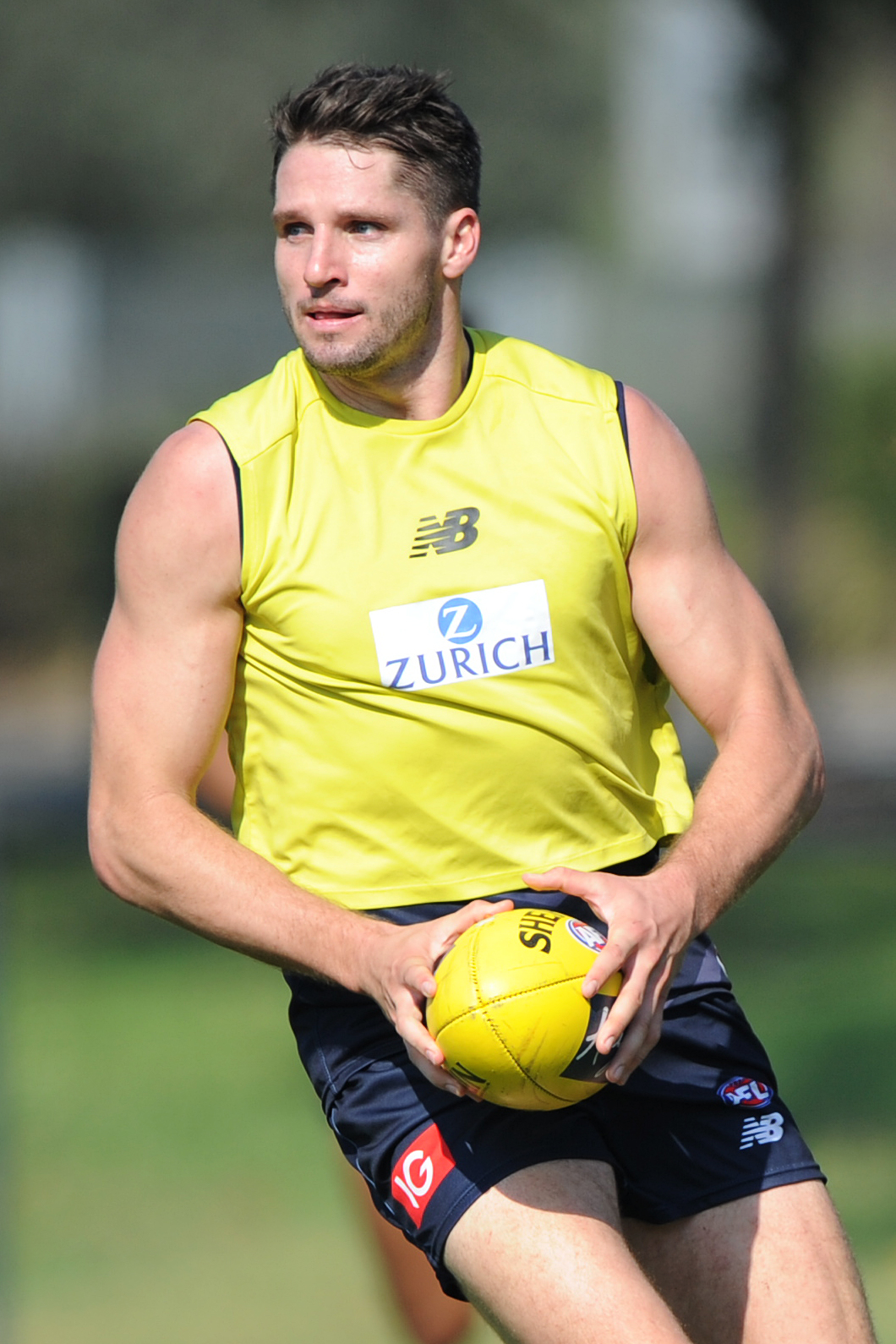
- Hogan with Melbourne in April 2018

Personal information
- Full name: Jesse Hogan
- Born: 12 February 1995 (age 31); Perth, Western Australia
- Original team: Claremont Football Club (WAFL)
- Draft: No. 2, 2012 mini-draft
- Debut: Round 1, 2015, Melbourne vs. Gold Coast, at MCG
- Height: 196 cm (6 ft 5 in)
- Weight: 100 kg (220 lb)
- Position: Key forward

Club information
- Current club: Collingwood

Playing career^{1}
Years	Club	Games (Goals)
2013–2018	Melbourne	71 (152)
2019–2020	Fremantle	19 (18)
2021–2026	Greater Western Sydney	100 (239)
2027–	Collingwood	0 (0)
Total		190 (409)

Representative team honours^{2}
Years	Team	Games (Goals)
2026	Western Australia	1 (5)
- ^{1} Playing statistics correct to the end of round 22, 2026.^{2} Representative statistics correct as of 2026.

Career highlights
- Coleman Medal: 2024; All-Australian: 2024; Kevin Sheedy Medal: 2024; Graham Moss Medal: 2026; 2× GWS leading goalkicker: 2024, 2025; 2× Melbourne leading goalkicker: 2015, 2016; Ron Evans Medal: 2015; Harold Ball Memorial Trophy: 2015; 2× 22under22 team: 2015, 2016; Under 18 All-Australian: 2012

Jesse Hogan (born 12 February 1995) is a professional Australian rules footballer for the Collingwood Football Club in the Australian Football League (AFL). A key forward, Hogan is 1.95 metres (6 ft 5 in) tall and weighs 100 kilograms (220 lb). He was a standout basketballer and footballer at a young age, representing Western Australia in both sports and played in the West Australian Football League colts competition with the Claremont Football Club. He was rewarded with All-Australian selection as a junior in the 2012 AFL Under 18 Championships and in turn, he was drafted by Melbourne with the second selection in the 2012 mini-draft, meaning he was ineligible to play in the 2013 AFL season. After a back injury ruined his 2014 season, he made his AFL debut in the 2015 season and won the Ron Evans Medal as the AFL Rising Star. In his first two playing years for Melbourne, he was the leading goalkicker in both seasons. In October 2018, he was acquired by Fremantle in a trade that sent him back home to Western Australia, however, after two unsuccessful years at the Dockers, Hogan was traded to Greater Western Sydney.

== Early life ==
Hogan is the youngest of four children by twelve years and was raised in Scarborough in Perth, Western Australia. He attended Newman College and played his junior football with the Marist Junior Football Club. He was awarded state selection in the under-16 Western Australian basketball squad, where his passion was with basketball before focusing on becoming a professional footballer. In 2011, he was recruited by West Australian Football League club, Claremont, and played for their colts (under-20) side in 2011 and 2012 for a total of 16 matches and 26 goals. As part of the AFL elite talent junior pathways, he was awarded a scholarship with the Australian Institute of Sport (AIS) as part of the AIS-AFL Academy for the 2011 intake in the level one squad.

Hogan received mid-year state honours in 2012 and was selected in the Western Australian squad in the under 18 championships despite being ineligible for the 2012 AFL draft as a 17-year old. His performances in the championships were rewarded with All-Australian selection as the centre half-back after playing in both the forward and back-line. He was highly rated during the championships and was touted as one of the two players who would be selected in the 2012 mini-draft. The Vic Metro coach during the 2012 championships, Rohan Welsh, noted Hogan's body size at 17-years-old was the size of a 20-year-old and he had the ability to "tear games apart". In August, he was named in the level two squad for the 2012 intake in the AIS-AFL Academy, however, he did not partake in the European tour in 2013 due to being drafted.

== AFL career ==
=== Melbourne (2013–2018) ===
==== 2013–2014: VFL and ongoing back injury ====
In October 2012, Hogan was acquired by the Melbourne Football Club with the second selection in the 2012 mini-draft, a special draft for players who were too young to be eligible for selection in the main 2012 AFL draft. As he was a pre-listed selection, Hogan spent the 2013 season playing for Melbourne's VFL affiliated team, the Casey Scorpions. He was, however, given permission by the AFL to play for Melbourne in the 2013 NAB Cup. His debut season with Casey finished prematurely when he suffered a season-ending knee injury in a game against Bendigo in August. Despite this, he won the Gardner Clark Medal as the club best and fairest after kicking 39 goals in 15 games. His inability to play at senior level in the AFL saw the hype surrounding him grow. He was often compared to other young key-forwards including Tom Boyd, Jonathon Patton and Joe Daniher as to who would be the best. He was also declared the player who could lift Melbourne from the bottom of the ladder. Then-Melbourne coach, Paul Roos, noted he would have vied for the number one draft pick in the 2013 AFL draft if he wasn't pre-selected in the mini-draft.

In March 2014, Hogan was sidelined after he sustained a lower back injury in Melbourne's NAB Challenge match against Geelong. The initial length of the injury ruled him out for four to six weeks, and despite setbacks, the club stated he could still make his AFL debut in 2014. This was ruled out when he was placed on the long-term injury list in May. In August, he made his return from injury playing for Casey in the team's second last game of the season. During the season, speculation arose that Fremantle were trying to lure him back to Western Australia with a lucrative offer, but in July, he signed a two-year contract extension with Melbourne.

==== 2015–2016: Rising Star winner and early career ====
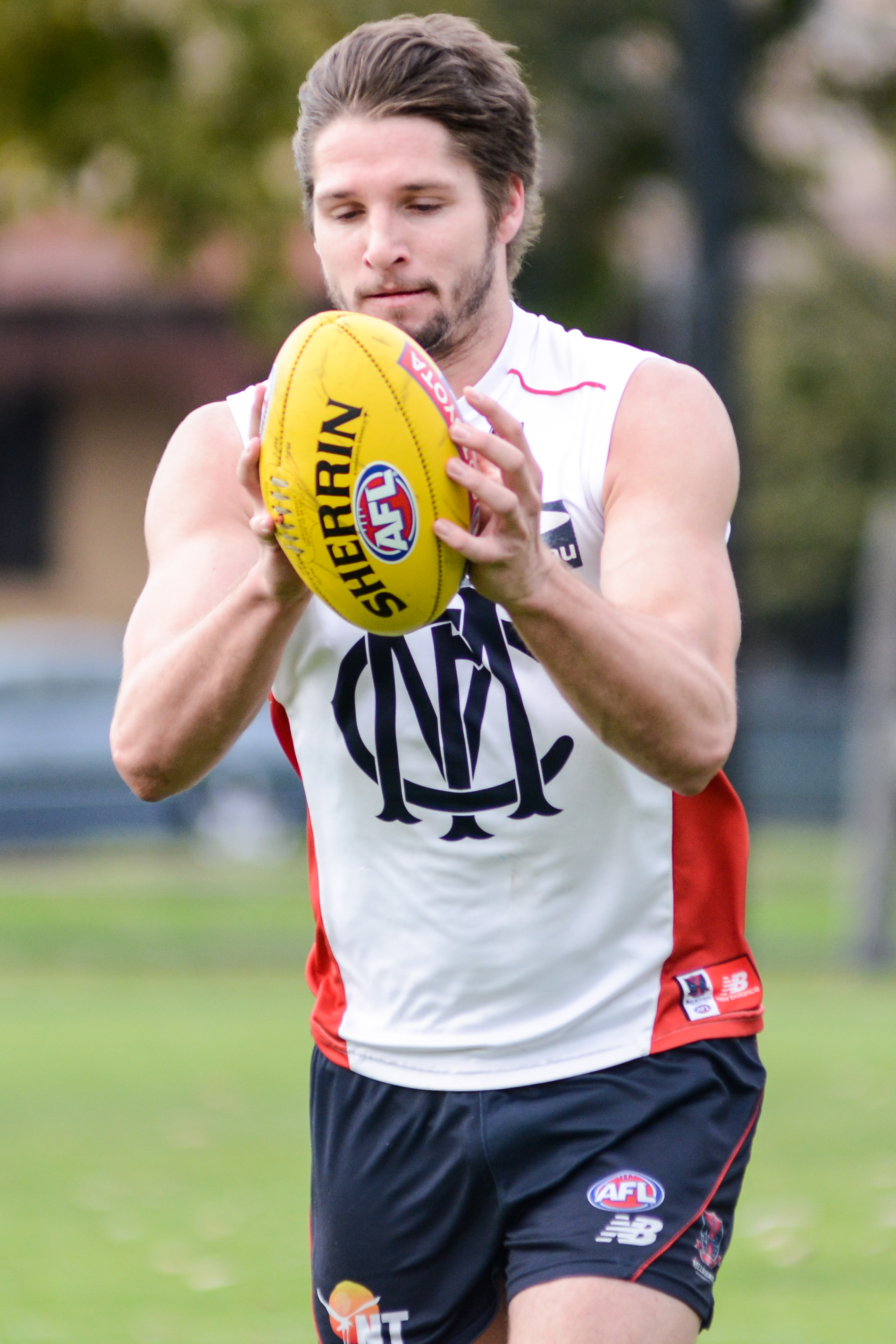
Hogan at training in July 2015

After being praised by his coaches and teammates for his preparation and professionalism over the off-season, Hogan made his long-awaited AFL debut in Melbourne's 2015 season opening round, twenty-six point win against Gold Coast at the Melbourne Cricket Ground (MCG). He finished the game with two goals and seven marks, helping Melbourne to their first 100-plus score since round 14, 2013. After round nine, he earned the round nomination for the AFL Rising Star where he recorded sixteen disposals, eight marks and two goals in the sixty-one point loss against Port Adelaide. He played 20 matches in his debut season, kicking 44 goals, the most for a player aged under 21 in their debut season since Chris Grant of Footscray kicked 51 goals in 1990. He was the leading goalkicker for Melbourne and finished third in the league for contested marks with 47 during the home and away season. During the season, he drew high praise from commentators, including former Western Bulldogs and Richmond coach, Terry Wallace, who claimed he was the best teenager since Chris Grant (whom Wallace played alongside and eventually coached). Australian Football Hall of Famer, Wayne Carey, questioned during the round 16 match against the Brisbane Lions whether "there has been a centre half-forward after 13 games who has been as impressive as this kid? This kid has been as good as any." Former Geelong captain, Cameron Ling, stated Melbourne should offer Hogan a lifetime contract as he has the potential to be to Melbourne what Michael Jordan was to the Chicago Bulls.

Hogan was one of the early favourites to win the 2015 AFL Rising Star alongside Isaac Heeney of Sydney, however, a seven-week knee injury to Heeney led many to believe the Rising Star winner would be decided between Hogan and Patrick Cripps of Carlton. In what was predicted to be one of the closest vote counts for the Rising Star, Hogan was the eventual winner of the Ron Evans Medal, earning the maximum five votes from nine of the ten judges, with Kevin Sheehan awarding him four out of five votes. He ultimately finished with 49 votes out of a possible 50. He became the first key forward to win the award since Nick Riewoldt won in 2002, and the second Melbourne player overall to receive the award after Jared Rivers won in 2004. His season was later assessed by journalists at AFL Media as the third best by any rising star winner since 2000. In addition, he was recognised as the best young player at Melbourne by winning the Harold Ball Memorial Trophy, along with placing fourth in the best and fairest count, finishing with 286 votes. He was also one of the three Melbourne players nominated for the AFLPA MVP award, alongside Nathan Jones and Bernie Vince. Furthermore, he was recognised as one of the best young players in the league when he was named as the centre half-forward in the 22under22 team.

Hype surrounding Hogan entering the 2016 season was high when Collingwood captain Scott Pendlebury claimed he could kick 100 goals during the season, and Herald Sun head of football writer, Mark Robinson, named him in the top fifty best players in the league. In addition, the media pondered whether he could take his game to "another level". He played in the opening match of the 2016 NAB Challenge against Port Adelaide and the final match against St Kilda, with the latter drawing criticism for his goalkicking technique, particularly from former Melbourne forward David Schwarz, who labelled his goalkicking as "shocking and a disgrace". This criticism followed him throughout the first half of the season, in addition to him having "poor body language" and "giving up" during matches. In response to the criticism, he met with Wayne Carey in April to address his "on-field frustrations". His season was also filled with conversation surrounding his contract after he delayed contract negotiations for the season in February. Despite being contracted until the end of 2017, talk of him returning home to Western Australia was continuous, which Melbourne captain Nathan Jones called a "circus". He ended the speculation by signing a two-year contract extension in October until the end of 2019, stating "Melbourne is where I want to be." He later addressed his form for the season in March 2017 by stating the thought of returning to Western Australia impacted his head space and the ability to perform.

Hogan played in 21 out of a possible 22 matches in 2016 due to being a late withdrawal from the twenty-nine point win against Hawthorn in round 20 after he bruised his knee hitting the goal post in the two-point win against Gold Coast the week before. He kicked a total of 41 goals, which made him Melbourne's leading goalkicker. In the final six weeks, he kicked two goals and nine behinds, which contributed to his goal kicking percentage dropping from 69.8% in 2015 to 55.4% in 2016. Despite criticism and a drop in goal kicking accuracy, he was still highly rated within the industry, with former forward Barry Hall labelling him the second best young key forward in the league, and the fans rating him the fourth best young player in the league in an online survey. He was also named in the "20in2020" team, a team comprising the best twenty players drafted from the previous four AFL Academy intakes, and he was named in the AFL Media team of the week three times during the season. Additionally, he was selected as the centre half-forward in the 22under22 team for the second consecutive year, finished eighth in Melbourne's best and fairest count with 261 votes, and was recognised as one of the best young players in the league by the AFL coaches, finishing as the runner up in the AFLCA best young player award behind Sydney midfielder, Isaac Heeney.

==== 2017–2018: Personal challenges and injuries ====
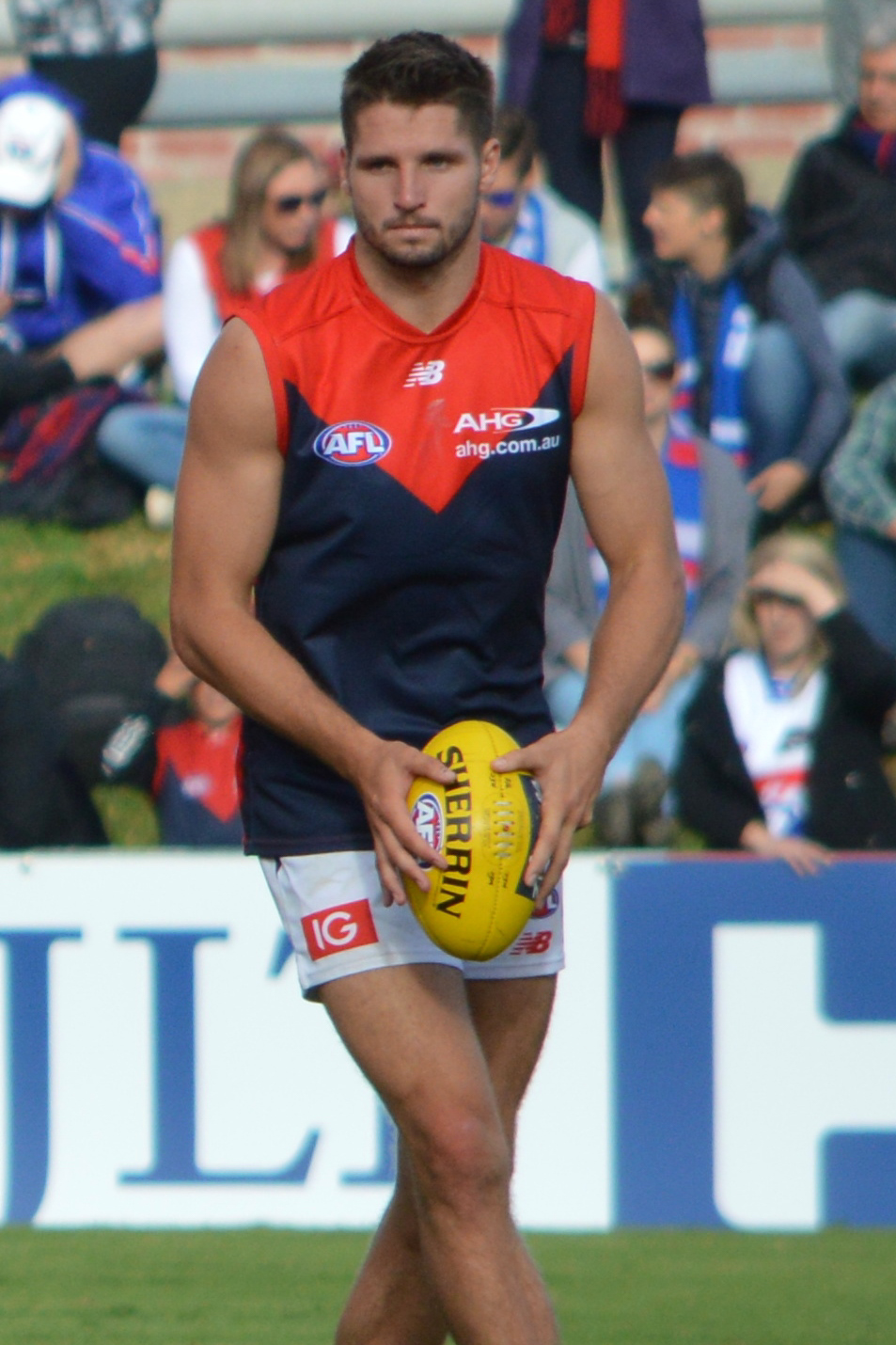
Hogan during a pre-season match in February 2017

In February 2017, after a standout pre-season, new Melbourne senior coach Simon Goodwin predicted that Hogan would be a key driver behind any future Melbourne success due to being in a settled environment following his contract extension in 2016. As is came to be however, Hogan endured a tough year on and off the field. He played the first two matches of the year before he was reported for striking Sam Rowe in Melbourne's twenty-two point win against Carlton in round two and was ultimately suspended for two matches. He returned from suspension for the Anzac Day eve match against Richmond at the MCG in round five. The death of his father, Tony Hogan, two days later due to cancer saw him miss the round six match against Essendon at Etihad Stadium. He returned the next week for the round seven match against Hawthorn, before being a late withdrawal for the match against Adelaide at the Adelaide Oval a week later due to illness. It was revealed a few days later, he had been diagnosed with testicular cancer and he was ruled out of playing for an indefinite amount of time.

Hogan returned to playing nine weeks after the initial cancer diagnosis in the eight point win against Carlton at the MCG in round sixteen. He played four consecutive matches until he broke his collarbone in the first quarter of the round nineteen match against North Melbourne at Blundstone Arena. Despite requiring surgery for the injury, he returned three weeks later for the thirteen point win over Brisbane at the MCG in the penultimate round of the home and away season. In what was his 50th career match, he kicked six goals to take his career goals to over 100. He was subsequently named in the AFL Media team of the week. Entering the final round of the season, Melbourne needed to defeat Collingwood to ensure they would play finals for the first time since 2006; Hogan injured his hamstring in the first quarter, but was expected to return for the first week of finals two weeks later if the club qualified. After losing to Collingwood and other results not favouring Melbourne, the club missed the finals by 0.5 percentage points. He finished the season with ten matches and twenty goals.

In 2018, Hogan was key to Melbourne's push for its first finals campaign in 12 years. However, following a loss to Sydney in round 21, Hogan was ruled out for the rest of the season with a partial stress fracture in the navicular bone in his foot. At the time of his injury, Hogan was sixth on the Coleman Medal table with 47 goals.

=== Fremantle (2019–2020) ===
Following the 2018 season, the Fremantle Football Club were deemed a likely candidate to land Hogan, with Hogan looking to return home to Western Australia. In October 2018, after initially withdrawing from their pursuit of Hogan, supposedly due to the Demons' high demands for him, the Dockers acquired Hogan and pick 65 from Melbourne in exchange for picks 6 and 23 on the final day of the AFL's trade period. He subsequently signed a three-year contract with Fremantle. After missing the Dockers' 2019 season opener after breaking the team's alcohol policy, Hogan struggled over the early portion of the season. Over his first nine matches, he registered 8 goals and 8 behinds, including failing to tally a kick for the first time in his 80-game career during Fremantle's one-point win over Brisbane in round 10. On 19 July, Hogan was ruled out for the rest of the season after suffering a recurrence of an injury to the navicular bone in his right foot, which was initially sustained with Melbourne in 2018.

On 29 January 2020, Hogan took leave away from the club to deal with mental health challenges.

=== Greater Western Sydney (2021–2026) ===
After the 2020 AFL season, in which he only managed seven games and five goals for the Dockers, Hogan requested a trade to Greater Western Sydney. He was traded on the first day of trade period in exchange for pick 54. A quad injury forced Hogan out of the opening six weeks of the season. He kicked a game-high four goals in his debut for the Giants in round seven of the 2021 season against Adelaide. After only two games, a calf injury sidelined him for an extended period. He only missed one more game from round 17 onwards and finished the home and away season with 18 goals in eight games. Hogan made his finals debut against Sydney in the Elimination Final, kicking two goals and taking six contested marks. He pinged his calf during the match and missed the Giants' semi-final.

On 23 August 2021, Hogan signed a one-year contract extension with the Giants.

Hogan dealt with soft-tissue soreness during the 2022 pre-season, which led to him missing round one.

On 12 August 2022, Hogan signed a new two-year deal with the Giants.

On 19 August 2023, Hogan kicked a career-high nine goals with 17 marks and 24 disposals in a 126-point win over Essendon. On 16 September, he kicked four goals to help the Giants defeat Port Adelaide in the semi final.

On 16 March 2024, Hogan kicked six goals with 18 disposals and eight marks in a 39-point win over North Melbourne. On 3 April 2024, he signed a new two-year deal with the Giants. Heading into round 23, Hogan was leading the league for goals, contested marks and marks inside 50. He had six goals in a nine-point win against Fremantle on 17 August to give himself an unassailable lead in the Coleman Medal. Hogan would go on to win the award with 69 goals kicked in the home and away season, 11 more than the next best goal scorer Jeremy Cameron. He finished with a goalkicking accuracy of 65.7 per cent, third behind Matthew Lloyd (71.9 per cent in 2003) and Fraser Gehrig (70.3 per cent in 2004) as the most accurate Coleman winners since 2002, when shots on goal started to be measured. When measured by just goals and behinds, Hogan became the sixth most accurate Coleman winner in the past 50 years. He finished with a career-high 77 goals after a five-goal semi-final performance against Brisbane. He earned All-Australian honours for the first time and was named the recipient of the Kevin Sheedy Medal as the club's best and fairest.

Hogan missed the start of the 2025 season with a broken thumb. He returned in round four to kick four goals against Hawthorn. In round five, he kicked an equal career-high nine goals in an 81-point over the West Coast Eagles.

In February 2026, Hogan was part of the 2026 AFL Origin match, representing Western Australia. He kicked five goals from 13 disposals to be named best on ground for Western Australia, receiving the Graham Moss Medal.

In the 2026 AFL season, Hogan missed the club's round six Sydney derby with a quad issue and then missed a month of football due to a hip injury. In a round 15 23-point loss to Carlton, Hogan first split the webbing in his right hand before fracturing his finger in a separate incident. He underwent surgery and was sidelined for an indefinite period. He played a total of nine games for the Giants in the 2026 season.

On 25 August 2026, Hogan was delisted by Greater Western Sydney after six seasons.

=== Collingwood (2027–) ===
In October 2026, Hogan was traded to Collingwood, becoming just the 14th player in the AFL era to join a fourth club.

== Statistics ==
Updated to the end of round 22, 2026.

Legend
G	Goals	K	Kicks	D	Disposals	T	Tackles
B	Behinds	H	Handballs	M	Marks
†	Led the league for the season

Season	Team	No.	Games	Totals							Averages (per game)							Votes
Season	Team	No.	Games	G	B	K	H	D	M	T	G	B	K	H	D	M	T	Votes
2014	Melbourne	1	0	—	—	—	—	—	—	—	—	—	—	—	—	—	—	0
2015	Melbourne	1	20	44	19	178	83	261	134	25	2.2	1.0	8.9	4.2	13.1	6.7	1.3	5
2016	Melbourne	1	21	41	33	206	104	310	149	29	2.0	1.6	9.8	5.0	14.8	7.1	1.4	6
2017	Melbourne	1	10	20	6	91	51	142	51	15	2.0	0.6	9.1	5.1	14.2	5.1	1.5	3
2018	Melbourne	1	20	47	23	210	155	365	125	41	2.4	1.2	10.5	7.8	18.3	6.3	2.1	5
2019	Fremantle	11	12	13	10	93	84	177	72	10	1.1	0.8	7.8	7.0	14.8	6.0	0.8	0
2020 (Note: The 2020 season was played with 17 home-and-away matches per team (down from 22) and 16-minute quarters with time on (down from 20-minute quarters with time on) due to the impact of the COVID-19 pandemic.)	Fremantle	1	7	5	4	41	29	70	37	4	0.7	0.6	5.9	4.1	10.0	5.3	0.6	0
2021	Greater Western Sydney	23	9	20	9	74	41	115	57	11	2.2	1.0	8.2	4.6	12.8	6.3	1.2	0
2022	Greater Western Sydney	23	18	35	21	146	88	234	130	35	1.9	1.2	8.1	4.9	13.0	7.2	1.9	5
2023	Greater Western Sydney	23	23	49	28	182	119	301	141	40	2.1	1.2	7.9	5.2	13.1	6.1	1.7	3
2024	Greater Western Sydney	23	25	77^{†}	26	221	85	306	163	34	3.1^{†}	1.0	8.8	3.4	12.2	6.5	1.4	15
2025	Greater Western Sydney	23	16	46	14	111	52	163	80	21	2.9	0.9	6.9	3.3	10.2	5.0	1.3	4
2026	Greater Western Sydney	23	9	12	12	56	25	81	40	8	1.3	1.3	6.2	2.8	9.0	4.4	0.9	0
Career			190	409	205	1609	916	2525	1179	273	2.2	1.1	8.5	4.8	13.3	6.2	1.4	46
