= Rohan Connolly =

Australian journalist (born 1965)

Rohan Connolly (born 1965) is an Australian journalist specialising in Australian rules football writing for The Age. Connolly began his media career writing for The Sun News-Pictorial in 1983 before moving to The Age in 1987, where he stayed until 2017. Connolly also appeared on radio station 3AW's AFL coverage as a boundary rider and in other on-air roles until the end of 2011, after which he joined 1116 SEN.

In 2008, he won the AFL Media Award for the Most Outstanding Feature Writer. Annually between 2002 and 2005 he co-authored with Jim Main the updated version of the reference book More Than a Century of AFL Grand Finals.

Connolly runs the footyology.com.au website.
