= Brayshaw =

Brayshaw is a surname of English origin. The name refers to:

- Andrew Brayshaw (b. 1999), Australian rules footballer
- Angus Brayshaw (b. 1996), Australian rules footballer
- Edward Brayshaw (1933–1990), British actor
- Georgina Brayshaw (b. 1993), British rower
- Hamish Brayshaw (b. 1998), Australian rules footballer
- Ian Brayshaw (b. 1942), Australian cricket player and Australian rules football player
- James Brayshaw (b. 1967), Australian cricket player and television sports announcer
- Mark Brayshaw (b. 1966), Australian rules football player
- Russ Brayshaw (1918–1996), Canadian professional ice hockey player
- Teddy Brayshaw (1863–1908), English international footballer
- Tommy Brayshaw (1886–1967), Canadian angler, conservationist, and artist
