= James Brayshaw =

Australian cricketer and media personality

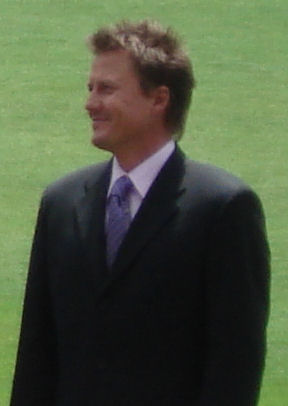
- Brayshaw in 2009

Personal information
- Full name: James Antony Brayshaw
- Born: 11 May 1967 (age 59); Subiaco, Western Australia
- Nickname: JB, Jim, Bray, Jing
- Height: 185 cm (6 ft 1 in)
- Batting: Right-handed
- Bowling: Right-arm medium
- Role: Batsman

Domestic team information
- Years: Team
- 1987/88–1990/91: Western Australia
- 1991/92–1996/97: South Australia

Career statistics
Competition	First-class	List A
Matches	75	35
Runs scored	4,934	589
Batting average	42.53	25.60
100s/50s	10/29	1/1
Top score	146	101*
Balls bowled	1,169	409
Wickets	10	8
Bowling average	57.20	40.00
5 wickets in innings	0	0
10 wickets in match	0	0
Best bowling	2/15	2/20
Catches/stumpings	43/–	12/–
- Source: CricInfo, 31 March 2008

James Antony Brayshaw (born 11 May 1967) is an Australian media personality and retired cricketer working in television for the Seven Network and radio for Triple M. For Seven Sport, he hosts and calls Test cricket during summer and Australian Football League during winter.

Brayshaw worked for the Nine Network for 15 years, calling AFL, cricket and co-hosting The Footy Show with Garry Lyon.

As a cricketer, he was known as Jamie Brayshaw. He is a former chairman of the North Melbourne Football Club, serving from 2008 to 2016. From 2011 to 2015, he was chairman of the Melbourne Renegades cricket team.

In September 2022, Brayshaw was made a life member of the North Melbourne Football Club.

== Cricket career ==
Like his father Ian Brayshaw, James Brayshaw played domestic cricket for Western Australia and then South Australia; Brayshaw had a career spanning almost a decade. In that time he was a consistent fielder, with 43 catches. Brayshaw is a two-time Sheffield Shield winner; this achievement was completed with two different states. In the 1987/1988 final, Brayshaw won with Western Australia, who defeated Queensland by 5 wickets. Brayshaw scored 24 off 104 balls and 4 off 8 balls; he also had the rare but dubious distinction of being caught by two international Test captains, with Allan Border in the first innings and Ian Botham in the second innings. The other Shield was in the 1995/1996 final, where he won with South Australia in a draw against his former state. Brayshaw performed solidly with the bat for the Redbacks, scoring 87 in the first innings and 66 in the second innings.

He would continue to play domestic cricket for one more season, retiring at 30 years of age to focus on his media career. He also played at first-class level for Australia A, but, due to Australian Cricket enjoying a successful era and many batsmen considered to be ahead of him, Brayshaw wasn't really in contention for a baggy green cap.

== Media career ==
=== Early career at Seven Network ===
Following his retirement from cricket in 1996, Brayshaw worked for the Seven Network in Adelaide. This included being a sports reporter for Seven Nightly News and working on local football discussion programs, including Footy Plus. In early 1998, he was teamed up with Amanda Blair and Paul Gale on Adelaide's SAFM, which eventually became the city's number-one rated breakfast show.

=== Arrival at Nine Network and Triple M ===
In 2001, his big break came as the host of the Seven's coverage of 2001 Ashes with Jeff Thomson, but he later moved to the Nine Network when the Australian Football League was transferred from Seven, becoming a commentator on Sunday, mainly with Brian Taylor, Garry Lyon and Dennis Cometti. He eventually became involved behind the microphone in Nine's cricket coverage. In 2005, Brayshaw co-hosted Any Given Sunday with Garry Lyon and Sam Newman. Brayshaw joined radio station Triple M in 2002 as a commentator in its AFL coverage. He also worked as a full-time co-host on breakfast program The Cage before it was axed in 2007 due to high costs and poor ratings. Previously, he had been part of the Melbourne-based version of the show via his home studio in the Adelaide Hills.

In 2006, Brayshaw (along with Garry Lyon) replaced Eddie McGuire as host of The AFL Footy Show, a position he held until the end of 2016. Additionally, with Lyon, he co-hosted the morning sessions of the 2006 Commonwealth Games in Melbourne.

Brayshaw was installed as chairman of the North Melbourne Football Club on 6 December 2007 after the club rejected the AFL's deal to permanently relocate to the Gold Coast. He was in the role until the end of 2016 and was replaced by Ben Buckley.

Brayshaw also hosted The Sunday Footy Show from 2009 to 2011 and hosted the Australian version of Wipeout with Josh Lawson.

Brayshaw called the skiing snowboard events during the 2010 Winter Olympics in Vancouver and 2012 Summer Olympics in London, calling rowing both for Nine and Foxtel. He also been involved in golf coverage for Nine and was a main part of its cricket from 2011 to 2016, including calling the 2013/14 Ashes.

In December 2016, it was announced that Brayshaw had left the Nine Network after contract negotiations broke down. Brayshaw was replaced by Craig Hutchinson on The Footy Show.

=== Return to Seven ===
In February 2018, it was announced that Brayshaw would return to the Seven Network as an AFL commentator, mainly to call Saturday night matches for the network, replacing Basil Zempilas in the role. In July 2018, it was announced that Brayshaw would host and commentate for Seven Sport's coverage of Test cricket and the Big Bash League. From 2021, Brayshaw joined Brian Taylor in calling Friday night matches, replacing Bruce McAvaney who stepped down from Seven's AFL commentary team. He called the 2021 AFL Grand Final alongside Taylor; it was the first AFL Grand Final he has called on commercial television.

In addition to his work with Seven, Brayshaw currently co-hosts The Rush Hour on Triple M Melbourne with Billy Brownless. The show is broadcast weekdays in the drive-time slot. He also hosts Triple M's Saturday afternoon football program The Saturday Rub and calls Saturday afternoon football for the station. Additionally, he is a member of Triple M's Test cricket commentary team.

== Personal life ==
James Brayshaw is the son of Ian "Sticks" Brayshaw, former first-class cricketer for Western Australia and former Claremont WAFL premiership player, and the brother of Mark Brayshaw, a former player for North Melbourne and current CEO of the AFLCA.

In an accident on 20 September 2006, his 36-year-old sister Sally was killed instantly after the facade of her garage collapsed on top of her.

Brayshaw and his wife Sarah have four sons. On 23 October 2014, the couple announced their separation after 23 years of marriage. Since 2017, Brayshaw's current partner is Lisa Christie.

Brayshaw is the uncle of two AFL-listed players: Angus Brayshaw at the Melbourne Football Club, and Andrew Brayshaw at the Fremantle Football Club, with brother Mark the father of Angus, Andrew and Hamish, the latter of whom was delisted at the end of the 2020 AFL season.

He was educated at Scotch College, Perth, and Pembroke School.

Sporting positions
Preceded by Anthonie Ferreira	Nelson Cricket Club; Professional; 1989	Succeeded by Brendon Julian
Preceded by Graham Duff	North Melbourne Football Club Chairman; 2007–2016	Succeeded by Ben Buckley
