= Scotch College, Perth =

School in Western Australia

Scotch College
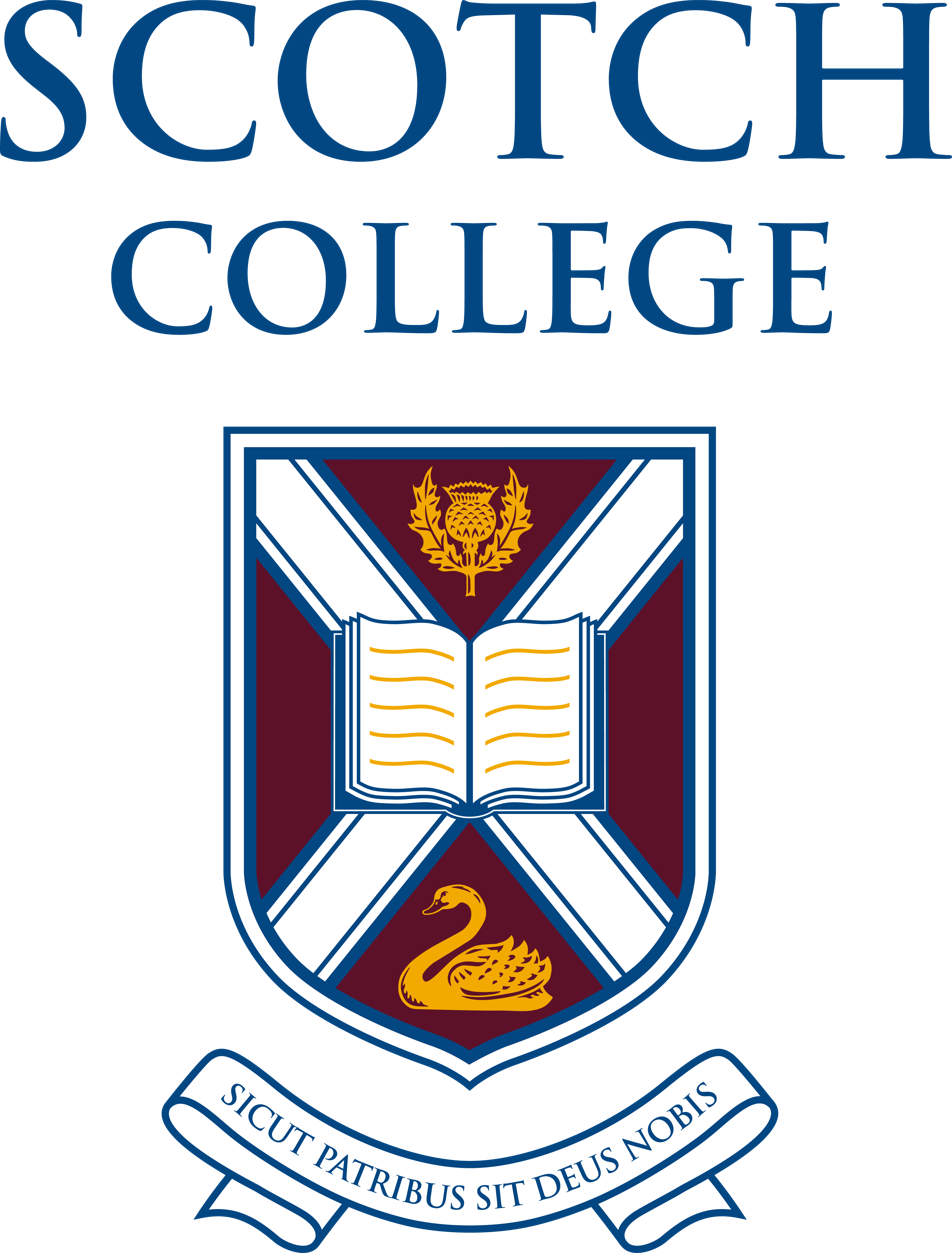

- Collegians' House, the administration building

Location
- Swanbourne, Western Australia; Australia; 31°58′52″S 115°46′23″E

Information
- Former name: The Alexander Scotch College
- Type: Independent single-sex early learning, primary, and secondary day and boarding school
- Motto: Latin: Sicut Patribus Sit Deus Nobis (May God be with us, as He was with our forefathers)
- Denomination: Uniting Church
- Established: 1897; 129 years ago
- Founders: Jane Alexander; David Ross
- Sister school: Presbyterian Ladies' College, Perth
- Headmaster: Alec O'Connell
- Staff: 394
- Years: Early learning and K–12
- Gender: Boys
- Enrolment: ~1,895 (2019)
- Campuses: Swanbourne: 9–12; Claremont: Early learning; K–8; Sports grounds and boarding facilities; Dwellingup: Outdoor education
- Campus type: Suburban
- Colours: Maroon, navy, gold, fawn and blue
- Slogan: Preparing Boys for Life, A Community for Life
- Nickname: Scotch, SC
- Publication: Reporter, Clan, Thistle (eNews)
- Affiliations: Public Schools Association; Headmasters' and Headmistresses' Conference; Junior School Heads Association of Australia; Round Square Schools
- Alumni name: Old Scotch Collegians
- Website: scotch.wa.edu.au global.scotch.wa.edu.au

Scotch College (informally known as Scotch or SC), is an independent Uniting Church primary and secondary school for boys, located in the Perth suburb of Swanbourne, Western Australia. It has both day and boarding students.

Founded in 1897 by the Presbyterian Church of Australia, the school caters for approximately 1,900 boys from early learning, through pre-kindergarten to Year 12. The school has undertaken the International Baccalaureate's Primary Years and Middle Years programmes since 2003; and offers the Diploma Programme for year 11 and 12 students. The school continues to run the state education WACE course and VET (Vocational Education Training).

In 2023, Scotch College launched Scotch Global. As a branch of the College, Scotch Global primarily offers online education to students of all genders. Scotch Global's offerings are split into three streams: Connect, Thrive and Accelerate. Connect programmes offer access to private education from home, including the Australian Curriculum from Years 6 to 10 and the International Baccalaureate Diploma Programme in the final years of high school. The Thrive stream offers extension and enrichment courses. The Accelerate stream offers career development for secondary school students and graduates.

The school is a member of the Public Schools Association (PSA), the Junior School Heads Association of Australia, and is a member of Round Square Schools.

Scotch College spreads over a large campus in Swanbourne. It also has an outdoor education centre in Dwellingup. The campus in Swanbourne consists of a senior school for years 9 to 12, a junior school for early learning pre-kindergarten to Year 5, and middle school for years 6 to 8. Also located on campus are playing fields spanning 15 hectares, and boarding facilities for 160 students.

== History ==
=== Foundation ===
David Ross, a founder of Scotch College

Scotch College owes its foundations to a conversation at an 1896 dinner party, where the parent of a 12-year-old boy, Jane Alexander, wife of William Alexander, MLC, complained that there was an absence of a Presbyterian school for boys in Perth. She offered David Ross, moderator of the Presbyterian Church in Western Australia, £500 to establish Scotch College. The announcement of the college came on Monday 4 January 1897, in the form of an advertisement. The advertisement included the first location of the school, Shearer Memorial Hall, which is now the Perth Trades Hall. When founded, the school was originally named The Alexander Scotch College. The school would later shorten its name to Scotch College in 1908 for banking purposes.

In 1905, the college became a founding school of the Public Schools Association, showing it to be by that time a well regarded independent school, and entitling it to take part in the most competitive schoolboy sporting competition in Western Australia.

=== World War One to World War Two ===
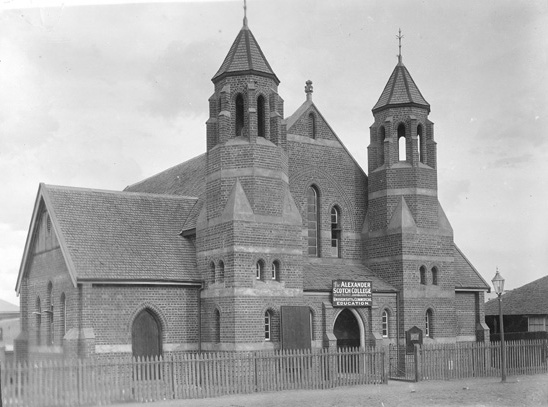
Alexander Scotch College 1904

During World War I, 475 boys enlisted to defend the empire as part of the Allied forces. This number represented over 50% of all Scotch alumni at the time. A roll of honour is present in Collegians House, the current administration building, featuring the names of all past Scotch College boys who had volunteered to fight.

In 1939, the Head Masters' Conference approached the Commonwealth Government for financial assistance due to low staff salaries, the standard of the school's science facilities and the lack of money the school possessed. When gifts of money to the school became tax deductible in 1954 (provided donations were for the purpose of either repaying debt on buildings or helping to fund new building projects), people found they had more incentive to donate to schools. This led to Scotch, among other schools around Australia, beginning fundraising appeals within the school community.

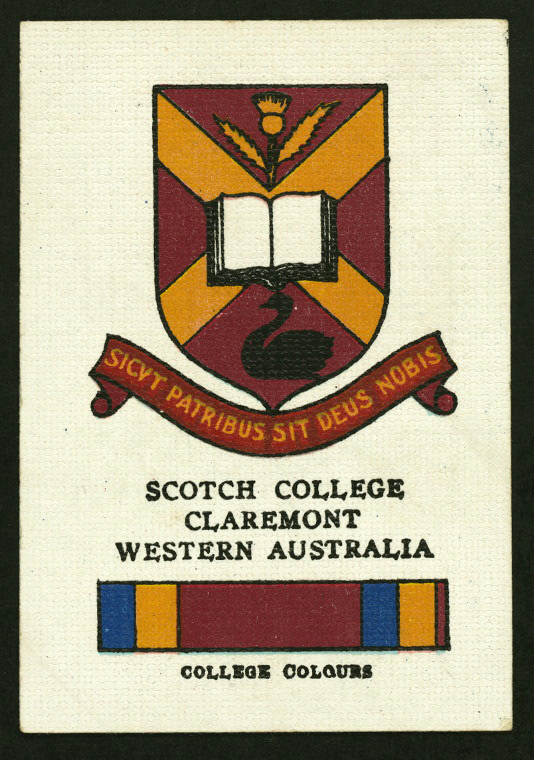
Collectable cigarette card featuring the Scotch colours and crest, c. 1920s

=== Post war ===
Even before donations were made tax deductible, an appeal to fund a memorial for past boys who served in the Second World War raised £9,000 by 1950. When the school's council, the town in which Scotch resides in, inquired about the cost for a memorial hall to sit 650 people, they were shocked to discover it would cost around £30,000. A fete organised in 1953 raised £2,500. Another fete was arranged and appeals to both past students and parents increased the total raised to £17,500. Despite lack of funds, David Brisbane, a council member since 1945, laid the foundation stone for the hall in early 1957. Although donations to schools over £1 had been tax-deductible since 1954, it was not until January 1957 that the Taxation Department informed the school that all donations towards the new Scotch College Building Fund would be tax-deductible. The appeal committee launched a major appeal raising £23,000 for the Memorial Hall.

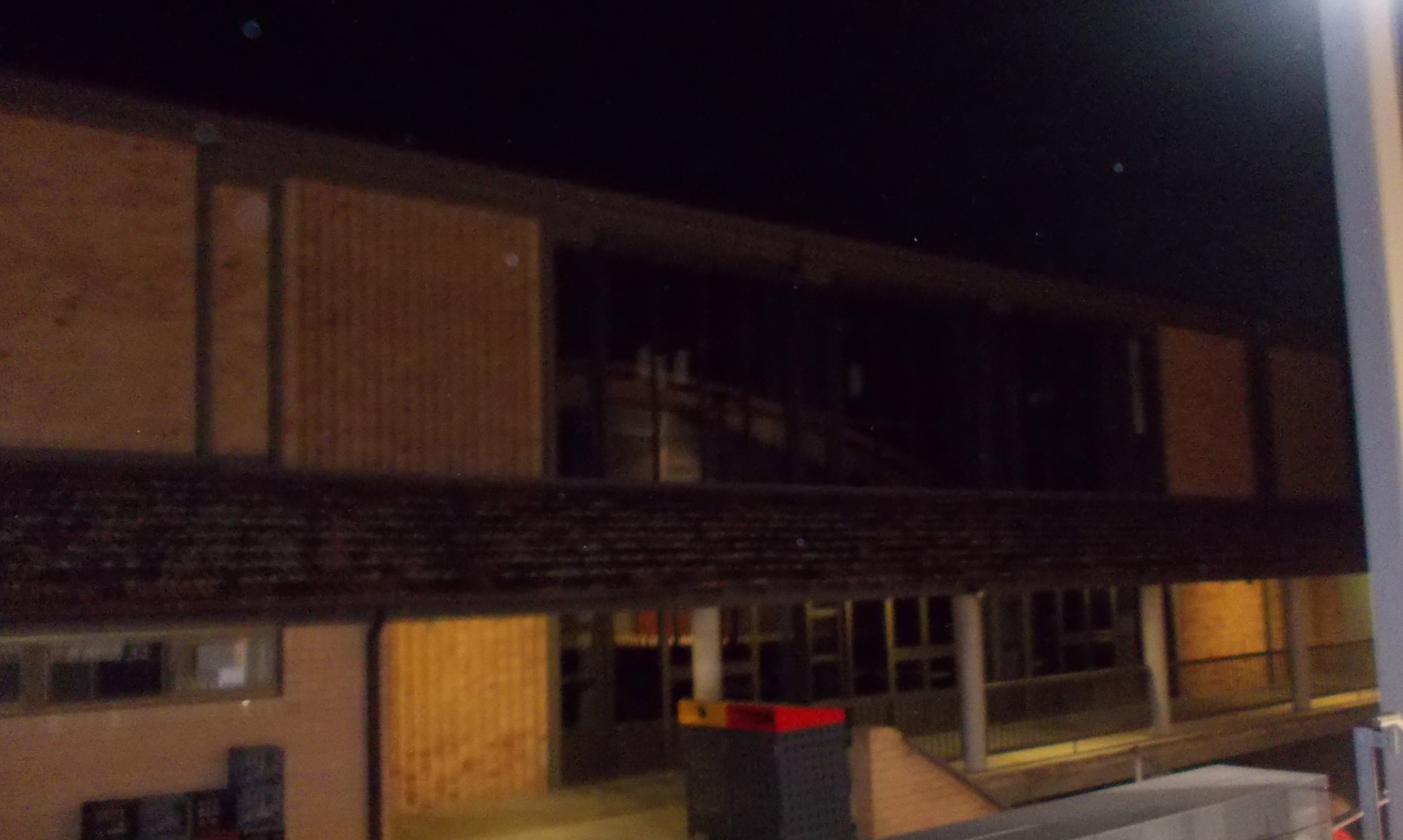
Memorial Hall of Scotch College

The Memorial Hall was opened by Sir Charles Gairdner, Governor of Western Australia at the time, on 19 October 1957, the same year as the school's Diamond Jubilee. The opening led to a further £30,000 in promised donations, although the actual amount received was below this figure. Eventually the cost of the hall led to the school having to be provided a £25,000 overdraft from the ASB Bank; this led to an increase in school fees. The total cost of the Memorial Hall was £48,864 and the appeal raised £45,700. Gordon Gooch, who has a sports pavilion at the school named after him, met the shortfall.

=== 1970 to 1990 ===
In 1971, after observing the May 1968 French riots, a group of Year 12 boys organised a "schoolboy strike" on the regulations of hair length, after the issue had been simmering for several months. The strike involved 60 boys refusing to return to class after the lunch bell, despite threat of expulsion, which led the headmaster to arrange an assembly for all boys after having a psycho. The ringleader of the strike, Cary Kallis informed the Nine Network newsroom to announce the strike. However, Kallis informed several boys which led to news of the strike quickly spreading around the school. After being threatened by a teacher with expulsion, Kallis quickly called Channel Nine again, pretending to be a teacher, by saying "The strike has been cancelled and the boys have been disciplined". As mentioned above, the strike still went ahead.

In 1984, Scotch acquired Moray, the school's outdoor education centre where students would be able to attend camps. This was purchased after the school had considered, for over a decade, the possibility of acquiring a site for a school camp. The Parents' Association gave support to the project and the school purchased the 164-acre (0.66 km^{2}) property through a mortgagee sale for $220,000. It was named Moray after a province in Scotland where Clan Murray originated (the Moray camp site is adjacent to the Murray River).

The Scotch College foundation was established in 1986, when Judge Robert Keall was chairman of the college. The foundation raised $1.1 million within six months to partly fund a new Physical Education Centre. Robert Keall opened the $2.25 million centre on 29 March 1988.

=== 1990 on ===
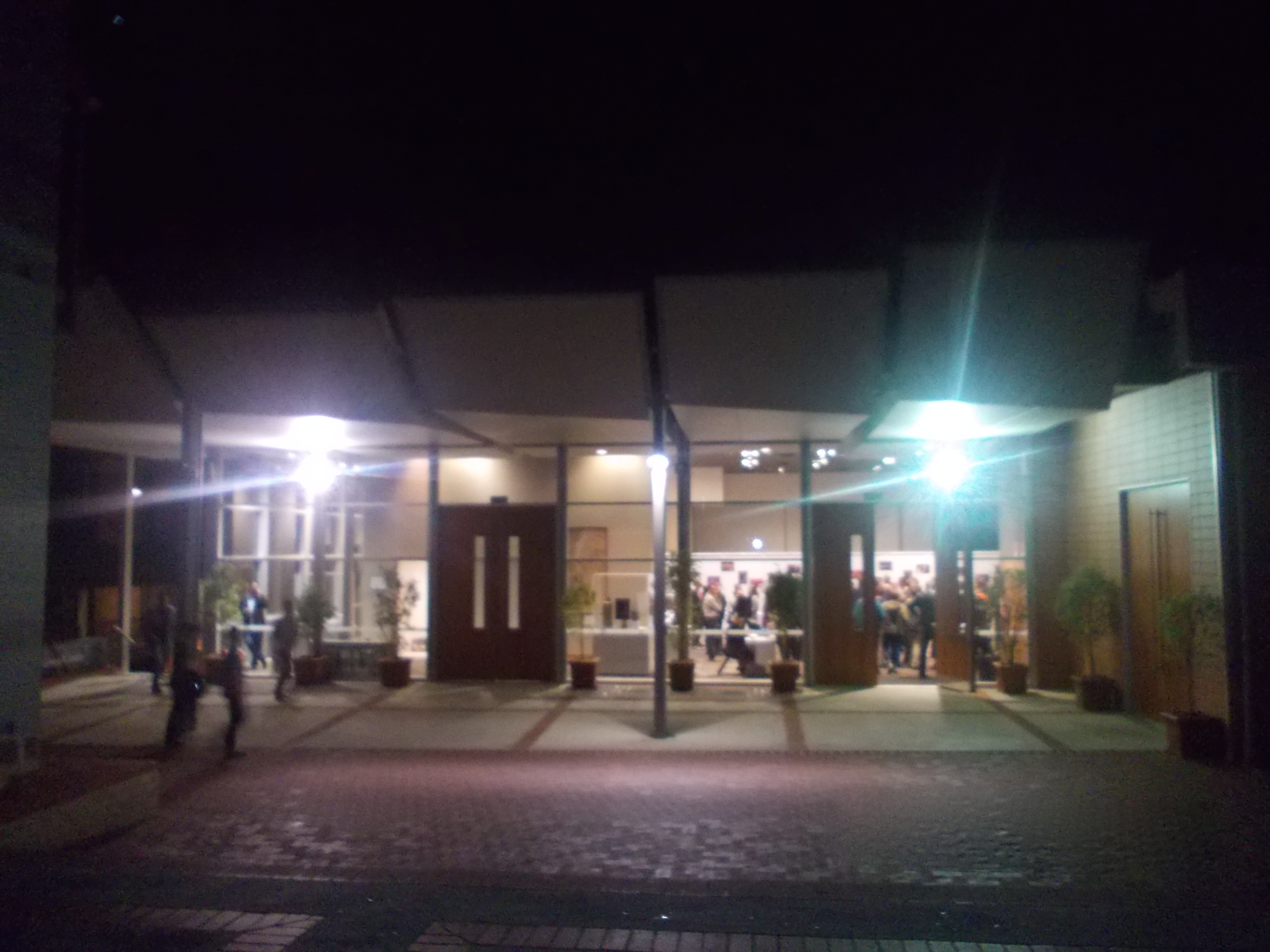
Dickinson Centre of Scotch College

In 2007, the school built the Dickinson Centre, named after Scotch's previous headmaster, the late W. R. Dickinson, for assemblies and other functions. In June 2009, the school opened a Science, Design and Technology building next to the school chapel. Designed by Taylor Robinson architects, the new facility marks the completion of the first stage of the school's Master Plan. A memorial service was held for the late W. R. Dickinson, the fifth headmaster of Scotch College, on 10 May 2006. A pavilion was erected on the Scotch playing fields, and the School and Pipe Band formed a guard of honour for the Dickinson family members and the funeral cortege as they arrived. In 2015, a new middle school campus was opened along with library facilities and gallery. Memorial Hall was refurbished in 2017 with a new Heritage Centre that houses the school's archival collection. In February 2019, the school's PC Anderson Chapel was refurbished and rededicated with the appointment of two new college chaplains.

In May 2017, Scotch College announced the banning of phones on campus during school. This decision was made to remove lunchtime distractions and encourage more face to face discussions among the students.

=== Schools ===
Scotch College has many schools and facilities.

- The brand new School of Mathematics and Commerce. This is the newest addition to the school.
- School of Design, Technology and Sciences. Built in 2011, this building houses facilities for production of handmades. The building also houses the school's science department. The building has many design flaws which include no natural light in many spaces of the building.
- Department of Humanities and Social Sciences.
- Department of Language Acquisition. The school offers studies in French, Indonesian and Spanish.
- Department of Performing Arts
- Department of Media and Visual Arts
- Department of Language and Literature
- Department of Physical Education

== Headmasters ==
Ordinal	Officeholder	Term start	Term end	Time in office	Notes
1	John Sharpe	1897	1904	6–7 years	
2	P. C. Anderson CBE	1904	1945	40–41 years	
3	G. G. Campbell	1945	1947	1–2 years	Acting
4	G. Maxwell Keys	1947	1968	20–21 years	
5	D. H. Prest	1969	1971	1–2 years	
6	W. R. Dickinson	1972	1997	24–25 years	
7	Andrew Syme	1998	2010	11–12 years	
8	Peter Freitag	January 2011	June 2011	0 years	Acting
9	Alec O'Connell	July 2011	incumbent	14–15 years	
10	Brad Gill	April 2024	August 2024	0 years	Acting

== Curriculum ==
Scotch offers a wide range of subjects in its academic curriculum. All students in years 8 to 10 study one language other than English – either French or Indonesian – through the International Baccalaureate's Middle Years Programme (MYP). In Year 8, boys undertake a community project.

Scotch awards several scholarships based on academic merit to students, but under agreed PSA rules no member schools may award sports scholarships. Entrance scholarships at Scotch are based on the results of scholarship examinations. In Year 11 there are two scholarships open to sons of former alumni (PC Anderson Memorial Old Boy's Scholarship) as well as the WR Dickinson Scholarship. To be considered, boys must have several references and nominations from the staff and are required to sit an interview and submit a copy of their resume.

=== Middle school structure ===
From 2003, when the school became an International Baccalaureate certified school, students began to study two languages, a maths, a science, an art, a technology, and a humanities and physical education subject.

Boys in years 9 and 10 have the option of choosing which technology and arts classes they take for either the year or semester. They may also take drama and music. Technology includes metal work, wood work, electronics, information systems and 3D modelling.

=== Academics ===
The school appears regularly in the top 50 schools for the Western Australian Certificate of Education.

Year	% +75 in WACE (Note: Based on the number of Stage 3 course enrolments in the school where a WACE course score of 75 or above was achieved)	State ranking (Note: Ranking of school compared to other schools in the state)	% +65 in WACE (Note: Based on the number of Stage 3 course enrolments in the school where a WACE course score of 65 or above was achieved)	State ranking	% graduation (Note: Percentage of Year 12 cohort that graduated with a WACE certificate)
2014	24.61	11	57.68	7	99.13
2013	22.50	8	48.73	10	96.77
2012	25.15	7	56.55	11	97.50
2011	19.38	21	56.60	17	99.33
2010	23.37	12	59.51	17	100
2009		17		22	99.44

== Scotch student life ==
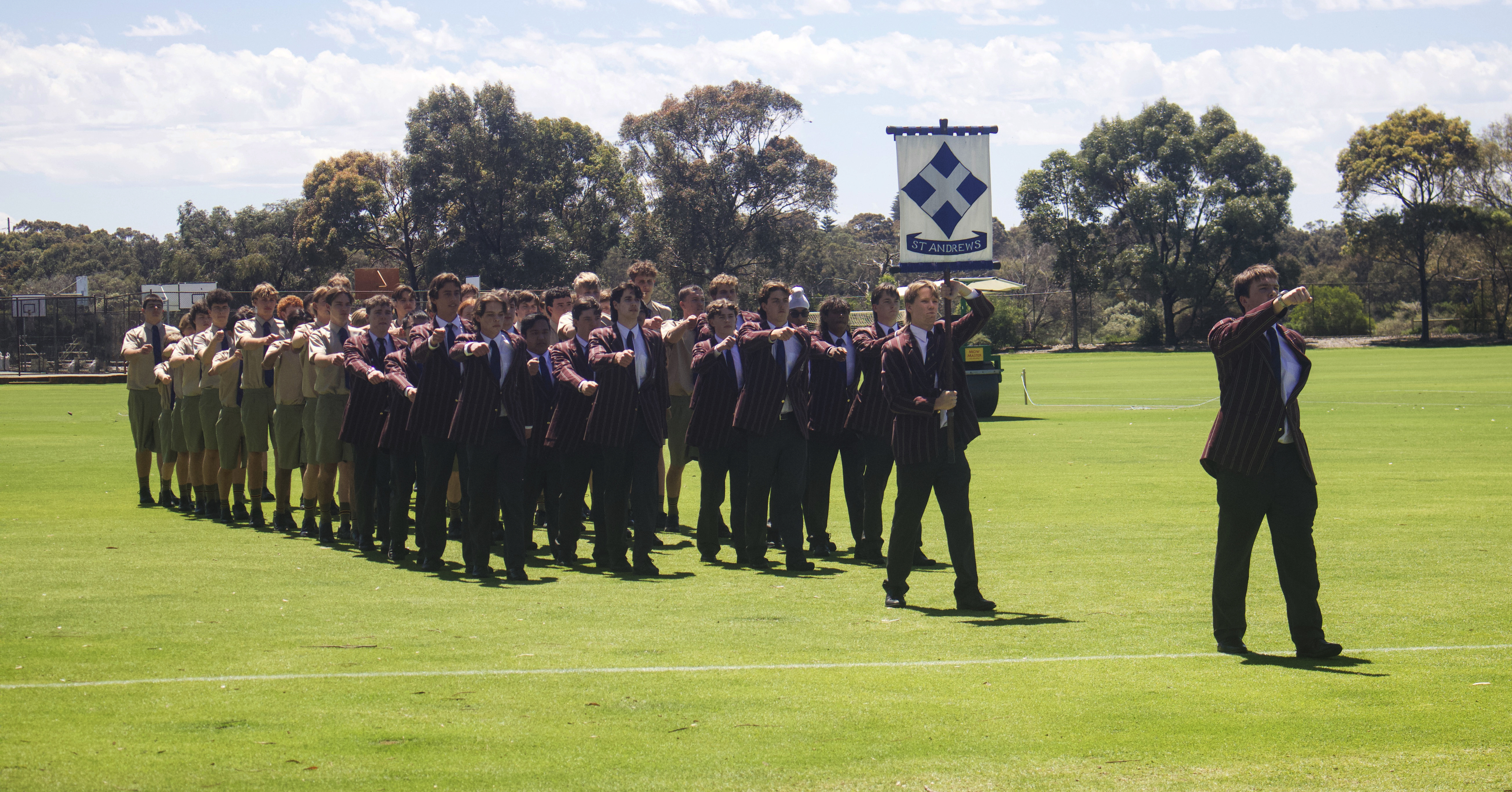
Scotch College marching. Note the different summer and winter uniforms.

Scotch offers an extracurricular activities program for students. The school has boarding facilities for students who live in rural areas of Western Australia, as well as international students. The major components of the program are sport, music, the arts and community and service. Students in years 10–12 may participate in FESA Cadet programs. Activities offered: Cadets, Chess, Debating, Instep, UNYA, Duke of Edinburgh, SMARTS, Prometheans, Drama, Music and Pipe Band.

=== Boarding ===
All boarding students live in residential houses, with boarding staff who also live on site. Boarders have 24-hour access to medical services. In 2006, international students were required to pay an extra $5,700 in lieu of government subsidies and extra administration costs.

On weekends boarders will often do a variety of activities that staff arrange. They also use the nearby Indian Ocean as well as Challenge Stadium and Subiaco Oval. Boarders in years 10, 11 and 12 will also participate in sport on a Saturday morning.

A boarding tradition at Scotch is walking the entire Bibbulmun Track. Boys walk sections of the track each year.

=== Moray ===
In year 5 and years 7, 8, 9 and 10 in the senior school, students camp for several days, depending on their age, at Moray near Dwellingup. Moray, close to the Murray River, is set in Australian bush and is 66 hectares.

=== House system ===
The pastoral care system is based on a house structure which deals with all matters relating to a student's well-being or curriculum needs. Each student is placed in a house tutorial group that is overseen by a house tutor for each of the ten houses in senior school.

In junior school however, there are only six houses and had nearly nothing to do with pastoral care. The ten houses listed below belong to the senior school whilst these six houses: Andrew (green), Bruce (orange), David (black), Gordon (yellow), James (blue) and Robert (red) will not be listed below.

Alexander	Green
Anderson	Black
Brisbane	Red
Cameron	Light blue
Ferguson	Brown
Shearer	Grey
Keys	Purple
Ross	Orange
St. Andrews	Blue
Stuart	Yellow

Most house tutorial groups have three students from each year level in that house. A house contains students from years 9 to 12. Each house is led by one head of house. The members of each house are led by a house captain, appointed by the head of house and the students in it. The houses meet on a regular basis. Prior to year 9, students are also placed in houses although the system is not as involved.

The house tutor and heads of house work as a team to monitor the academic and personal progress of each student in the house tutorial group and house. Generally, the house tutor is the first and main point of contact between the parent and the school. For more serious issues a head of house is usually contacted.

Students are either put in a randomly selected house or into the house of any alumni they are related to. Houses compete against each other in sports such as inter-house athletics and academic contests like debating. Students march to assembly on Friday mornings in their house and are marked on their performance.

The house that wins the most points over all inter-house competitions is awarded the staff trophy. This includes the larger inter-house events like athletics, cross-country and swimming as well as some smaller competitions like lightning chess and indoor soccer.

==== PSA premierships ====
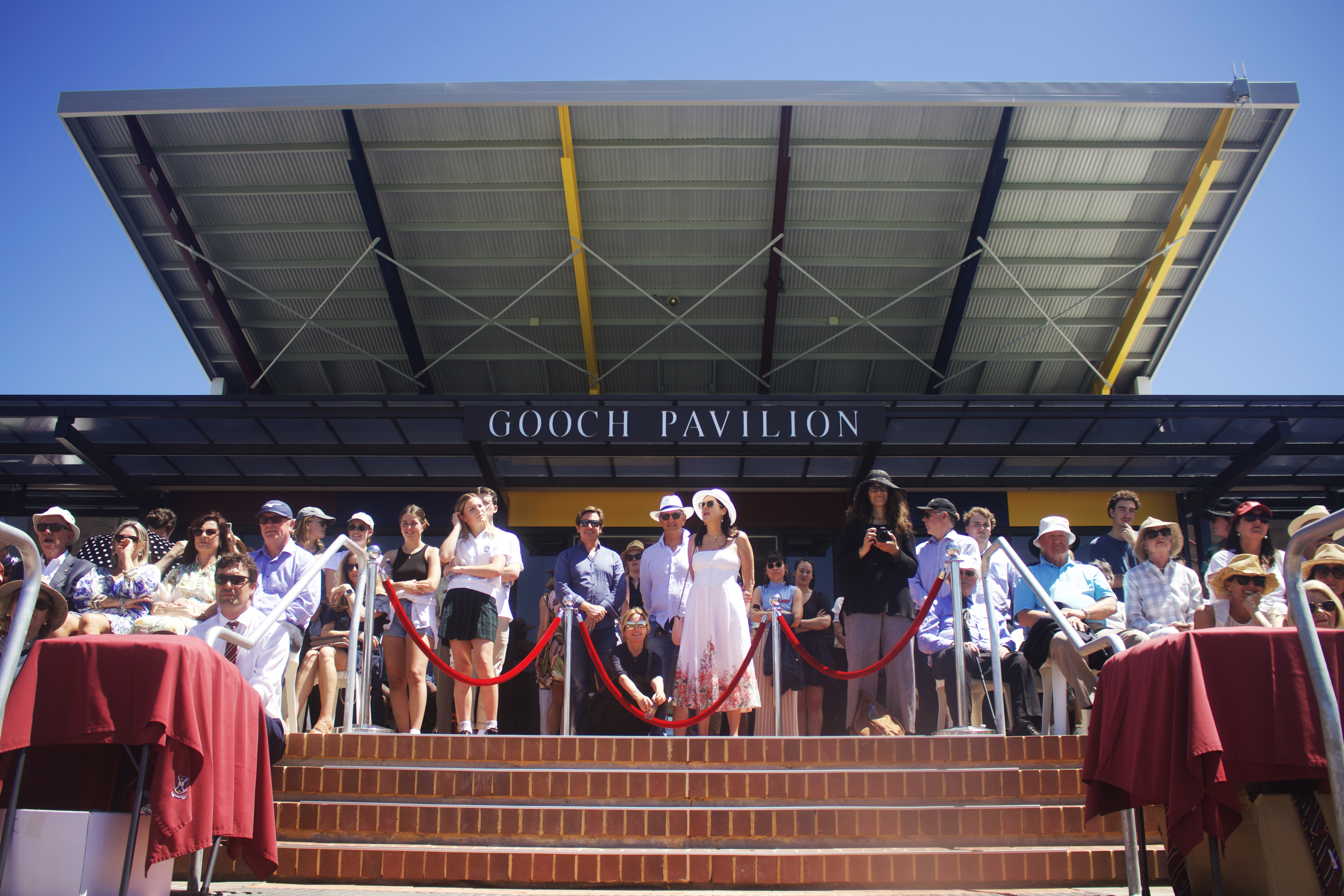
Scotch College Gooch

Scotch has won the following PSA premierships.

- Athletics (21) – 1948, 1954, 1959, 1960, 1961, 1962, 1963, 1964, 1983, 1984, 1996, 1998, 2013, 2015, 2016, 2018, 2019, 2021, 2022, 2023, 2024
- Badminton – 2016
- Basketball (5) – 2001, 2011, 2012, 2018, 2019
- Cricket (21) – 1908, 1912, 1913, 1914, 1918, 1923, 1924, 1929, 1930, 1932, 1939, 1949, 1952, 1954, 1960, 1970, 1974, 1978, 1996, 2012, 2014
- Football (24) – 1906, 1917, 1925, 1948, 1950, 1951, 1955, 1959, 1960, 1961, 1962, 1964, 1965, 1969, 1970, 1979, 1986, 1987, 1988, 1989, 1990, 1997, 2013, 2016, 2020, 2021, 2022
- Golf (2) – 2005, 2016
- Hockey (15) – 1961, 1983, 1991, 1995, 1997, 1998, 1999, 2000, 2001, 2003, 2004, 2005, 2006, 2008, 2015
- Rowing (24) – 1906, 1907, 1908, 1913, 1920, 1932, 1934, 1935, 1936, 1937, 1938, 1940, 1941, 1957, 1960, 1978, 1984, 1985, 1990, 2006, 2009, 2014, 2015, 2021,
- Rugby (18) – 1963, 1967, 1968, 1976, 1977, 1978, 1979, 1983, 1989, 1990, 2001, 2015, 2016, 2017, 2018, 2020, 2023, 2024
- Soccer (5) – 1996, 2003, 2013, 2017, 2018
- Surfing (7) – 2003, 2004, 2008, 2009, 2013, 2015, 2018
- Swimming (24) – 1906, 1907, 1908, 1909, 1912, 1913, 1914, 1915, 1917, 1918, 1921, 1927, 1928, 1929, 1930, 1947, 1948, 1949, 1950, 1953, 1955, 1957, 1985, 2023, 2024
- Tennis (8) – 1983, 2000, 2007, 2008, 2010, 2011, 2012, 2017
- Water Polo (6) – 1999, 2000, 2002, 2003, 2011, 2017

=== Arts ===
Scotch offers students an opportunity to participate in the annual school production. Productions have included Bugsy Malone, Grease, A Clockwork Orange, Blood Brothers, Holes, Charlie and the Chocolate Factory, Mad Forest, Babe the Sheep Pig, One Flew Over the Cuckoo's Nest, Great Expectations, The Addams Family, The Wedding Singer, The Government Inspector and We Will Rock You.

Scotch has two poetry prizes awarded each year; the Raven Senior Poetry Prize for years 11 and 12 and the Raven Junior Poetry Prize for years 8, 9 and 10. The winning piece along with several other pieces of student poetry and art are published in the annual school publication, Reporter. Raven prize winners are presented an award on speech night. There are also two annual prose prizes; the Raven Senior Prose Prize and the Raven Junior Prose Prize. Like the poetry prizes, the winning pieces are published in Reporter and the writer presented with an award on speech night.

=== Music ===
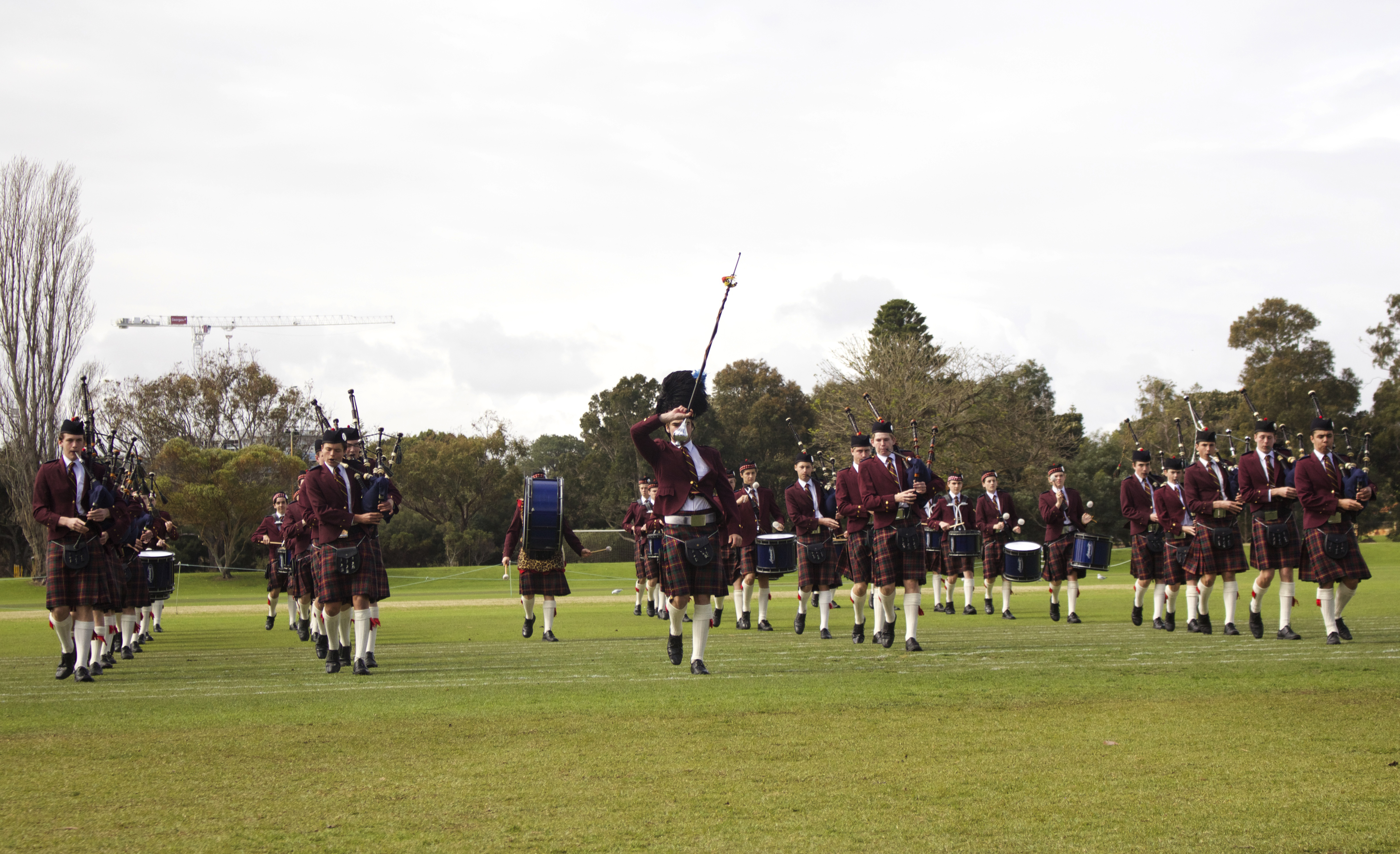
Scotch College Pipe Band

Scotch gives students the chance to learn instruments during class time in the senior school. Students can also join the pipe band where their playing and marching skills are developed by the Bandmaster to produce high quality pipers and drummers. The pipe band traditionally leads the school in marching.

In recent years there have been several pipe band and music tours. In April 2006, the pipe band toured the United States. The band played in the Virginia International Tattoo in that period It was the pipe band's fourth international tour and its second time participating in an international tattoo of that magnitude. The first was the Nova Scotia Tattoo in 2000. In 2015 and 2018, the pipe band was invited to perform at the Royal Edinburgh Military Tattoo, and the Basel Tattoo in 2019.

All students in the senior school are eligible to play in the school's bands. The school's music bands include Jazz Band, String Orchestra, Big Band 1 (guitar, drums, brass), Big Band 2 (guitar, drums, brass), Big Band 3 (guitar, drums, brass), Middle School Concert Band (years 6 to 10), Chamber Strings, Concert Band (brass and drums), Wind Ensemble (with Presbyterian Ladies' College), Vocal Ensemble, Brass Ensemble and Guitar Ensemble.

The school offers several music scholarships for students in year 7.

The school song is "God of Our Fathers" which is to the tune of "Highland Cathedral". The song is sung at the first and last assembly each term and the music is performed by two pipers and a snare drummer from the pipe band, along with a small brass support band.

=== Cross-campus classes ===
As part of efforts to reduce costs and increase efficiency, Scotch College runs "cross campus" classes with Presbyterian Ladies' College, Perth - their sister school. Shuttle buses operate between the two campuses every hour. These services along with the initiative provide students in Year 11s and 12 to further their education - by choosing subjects that interest them which may not be offered on campus due to budgetary constraints. The cross campus classes are particularly important for students studying for the IB Diploma. Money saved from the initiative is used to further the school's infrastructure - both academic buildings as well as sports pavilions and administrative buildings.

== Notable alumni ==
Alumni of Scotch College are known as Old Scotch Collegians.

=== Academia and science ===
- Akshay Venkatesh – mathematician, Stanford University, Fields Medallist

Rhodes Scholars

- 1922 Sir Walter Worboys (1900–1969)
- 1998 James Edelman

=== Arts and media ===
- Michael Charlton – ABC-TV journalist
- Tony Charlton – TV sports commentator
- Nicholas Hasluck – novelist, poet and short story writer; chair of Commonwealth Writers Prize see also Politics and law
- Gareth McGrillen – musician, Pendulum and Knife Party
- Toby Schmitz – Australian actor and writer
- Rob Swire – musician, Pendulum and Knife Party

=== Business ===
- Charles Bunning (1905–1994) – Chair, Bunnings
- Sir Colin Syme (1903–1986) – Chair, BHP

=== Education ===
- John Inverarity – educator, headmaster of Hale School see sport
- Ralph Townsend – educator, headmaster of Sydney Grammar School, Oundle School and Winchester College

=== Military ===
- Sir Peter Drummond DSO & Bar, MC, MIDs (1894–1945) – Air Marshall, Royal Air Force
- Eric Lacy Vowles – commandant of the Royal Military College, Duntroon

=== Politics and law ===
- Roger Cook – Premier of Western Australia
- John Dawkins – Federal Treasurer in the Keating government
- James Edelman – justice of High Court of Australia, Federal Court of Australia, & Supreme Court of Western Australia
- Nicholas Hasluck – justice of Supreme Court of Western Australia
- David Sadleir – Australian Ambassador to China at the time of the Tiananmen Square massacre

=== Sport ===
- Bailey Banfield – Australian Rules footballer
- Drew Banfield – Australian Rules footballer
- Jamie Beadsworth – Australian waterpolo player
- Geoff Boyce – Australian hockey player
- Michael Boyce – Australian hockey player. World Cup Silver Medal in 2006.
- James Brayshaw – cricketer
- Mark Brayshaw – footballer
- Ian Brayshaw – cricketer
- Mal Brown – Australian Rules footballer
- Daniel Curtin- AFL player
- Jonathon Charlesworth – Australian hockey player
- Mitch Clarke – basketball player with Perth Wildcats
- James Clement – AFL footballer
- Peter Evans – Olympic Gold medallist in swimming
- Mark Gale – Australian Rules footballer with Fremantle and St Kilda
- Terry Gale – golfer
- Shawn Gillies – cricketer
- Ross Glendinning – former Australian Rules footballer and Brownlow Medalist
- Cameron Green – Australian All-rounder test cricketer
- Nick Hobson – cricketer
- John Inverarity – Australian Test cricketer
- Rowan Jones – Australian Rules footballer. 2006 AFL Premiership winning player for the West Coast Eagles
- Matthew Kelly – cricketer
- Don Langsford – Australian Rules footballer
- Tom Ledger – Australian Rules footballer with St Kilda
- Tom Lee – Australian Rules footballer
- Luc Longley – former NBA and Australian Boomers basketballer – 3 x NBA Champion with the Chicago Bulls. Current assistant coach with the Australian Boomers.
- Ashley McIntosh – Australian Rules footballer. 2 x AFL Premiership player for the West Coast Eagles in 1992 and 1994.
- Hamish McKenzie – cricketer
- Alistair Nicholson – Australian Rules footballer
- Joel Paris – cricketer
- Mark Seaby – Australian Rules footballer. 2006 AFL Premiership winning player for the West Coast Eagles
- Barry Shepherd – test cricketer; state hockey player and cricket administrator
- Brynn Teakle-AFL footballer
- Jack Thompson - ultra cyclist
- John Welborn – rugby union footballer; first Western Australian to play for the Australian Wallabies
- John Winter – high jumper; won Australia's first gold medal at the 1948 Summer Olympics
- Tristram Woodhouse – Australian hockey player

== See also ==
- List of schools in the Perth metropolitan area
- List of boarding schools in Australia
- List of pipe bands
