= Ben Buckley =

Australian rules footballer, businessman, and chairman

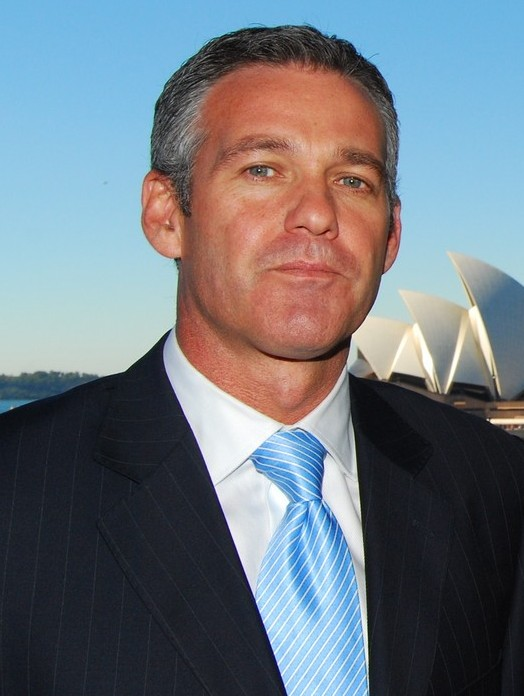
- Ben Buckley in 2008
- Born: 29 June 1967 (age 59); Melbourne, Australia
- Education: Royal Melbourne Institute of Technology
- Occupation: Businessman
- Employer(s): Nike, Inc. (1994–1996); EA (1999); AFL (1999–2006); FFA (2006–2012)
- Height: 1.85 m (6 ft 1 in)
- Spouse: Sophie Deligny
- Children: 4

Benjamin Buckley (born 29 June 1967) is an Australian businessman, former Australian Rules Footballer and former chairman of the North Melbourne Football Club in the Australian Football League. He is the former chief executive officer of Football Federation Australia.

== Australian football playing career ==
Buckley, a defender, played 74 games between 1986 and 1993 for North Melbourne in the VFL/AFL and was vice-captain from 1990 until 1992.

== Education ==
Buckley's secondary education was in his home state of Tasmania. He has a bachelor's degree in Applied Science.

== Working life ==
Buckley joined Nike, Inc. from 1994 as Director of Marketing in Japan and later took over the same role in Australia.

He was general manager of EA Australia briefly in 1999.

Buckley was then appointed the Australian Football League's general manager responsible for broadcasting, strategy and major projects, before becoming chief operating officer, a position which he held until 2006, when it was announced on 8 November 2006 that he will replace John O'Neill as chief executive officer of Football Federation Australia. Led unsuccessful bid to bring FIFA World Cup to Australia.

On 21 August 2012 it was announced he had stepped down from his position as chief executive officer of Football Federation Australia. At the same time, it was announced he would be replaced by former chief executive officer of the National Rugby League David Gallop

Currently Buckley is the Executive Director in Foxtel, overseeing and managing sports contents within this Broadcast media company.

On 20 October 2016, Buckley was voted in as the new chairman of the North Melbourne Football Club, replacing James Brayshaw. He stood down in 2022.

== Personal life ==
Buckley has four children, including Jack Buckley who plays football for Greater Western Sydney.
