= Jack Thompson (cyclist) =

Australian cyclist

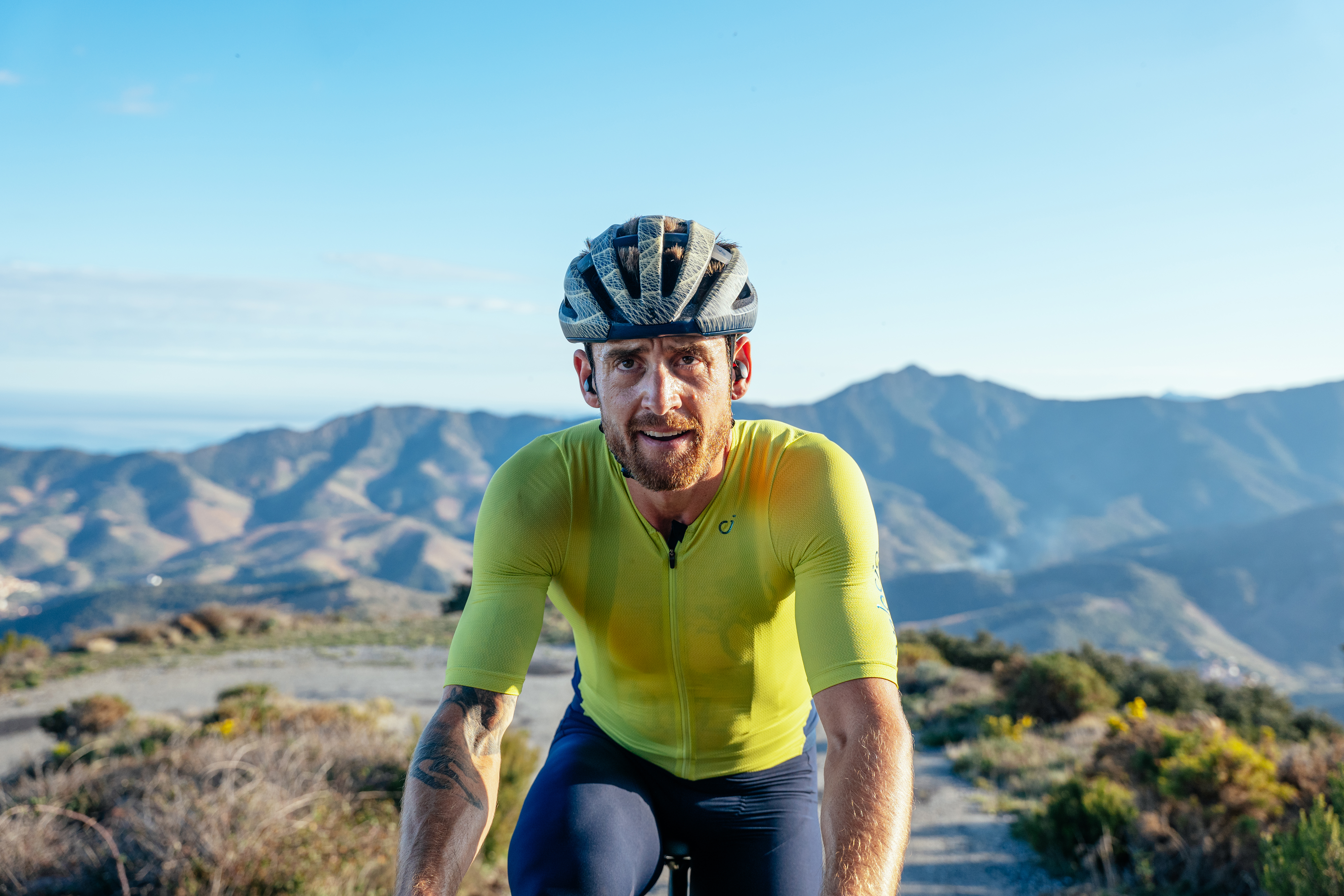
- Occupation: Ultra-cyclist
- Years active: 2016-present
- Notable work: Guinness World Record for most kilometres ridden unsupported in a week, Most everestings in a single calendar year.(As of 2023)

Jack Thompson (born 1988) is an Australian cyclist who made a world record of riding most kilometres unsupported in a week. He documents his challenges in the form of documentary films. Thompson is based in Girona, Spain.

== Biography ==
Having grown up in Perth, Thompson started cycling when he was a teenager. He attended and graduated from Scotch College in Perth, Western Australia and later on got his Bachelor's degree from Curtin University.

Instead of pursuing a career in professional cycling, Thompson started riding long miles in remote locations to build up his endurance for ultra-cycling. He began ultra-cycling in 2016 when he completed the fourth edition of the Transcontinental Race in Europe finishing number 30 in the race. The very next year he completed a Himalayan Expedition from Chengdu to Northern Laos completing 1829 km.

In 2019, Thompson completed The Grand Tours Everesting Project. The locations for this expedition were Passo Stelvio in Italy, Col de la Bonette in France and Port d’Envalira in Andorra.

Thompson set the Guinness World Record for most kilometres ridden unsupported in a week in 2020. He rode 3,505 km and total of 113 hours in Valencia, Spain within seven days.

In 2021, Thompson completed his own versions of the Tour de France. He waited for the official race to begin and after giving the tournament cyclists a head start, he tried to catch up with them. The goal was to reach Paris before them. He began his ride on 5 July, which was 10 days after the Tour de France had officially begun. On 12 July, Jack was able to overtake the peloton, and then went on to arrive in Paris three days before the official race arrived. His journey was covered in a documentary called "The Amazing Chase"

In 2022, Thompson began a new everesting expedition with a goal of climbing 1,000,000 meters of elevation (3,280,840 feet) on his bicycle and raising 1,000,000 Euro for four mental health charities. He reached the 1 million mark after 261 active days of cycling, completing one everesting per week. Thompson completed 52 everestings during this expedition, setting a world record of most everestings done in a single calendar year and a record of most elevation ridden on a bicycle in a year. The previous record was of 42 everestings held by Lachlan Morton. Thompson covered a total distance of 1,004,336 meters during this expedition.
