= 1967–68 Sheffield Shield season =

Australian cricket tournament

- Cricket format: First-class
- Tournament format: Double round-robin
- Champions: Western Australia (2nd title)
- Participants: 5
- Matches: 20
- Most runs: John Inverarity (Western Australia) (726)
- Most wickets: Alan Connolly (Victoria) (46)

The 1967–68 Sheffield Shield season was the 66th season of the Sheffield Shield, the domestic first-class cricket competition of Australia. Western Australia won the championship. In October 1967, Ian Brayshaw of Western Australia took ten wickets in an innings against Victoria.

== Table ==
Team	Played	Won	1st Inns Won	Drawn	1st Inns Lost	Lost	Points
Western Australia	8	5	1	0	0	2	54
Victoria	8	4	1	1	0	2	46
South Australia	8	5	0	0	0	3	42
New South Wales	8	2	0	0	2	4	20
Queensland	8	0	1	1	1	5	14

== Statistics ==
=== Most Runs ===
John Inverarity 726

=== Most Wickets ===
Alan Connolly 46
