= Amanda Blair =

Australian radio broadcaster

- Born: 20 October 1968 (age 57); Melbourne, Victoria, Australia
- Occupation: Talkback radio presenter
- Spouse: Michael Farquharson

Amanda Blair (born 1968) is an Australian radio broadcaster, a former columnist with the Sunday Mail.

She started her radio career in Melbourne in 1996 when she made an appearance on the Richard Stubbs Breakfast Show on Triple M to promote her book The Essential Pauline Hanson. She was signed with Austereo, and moved to Adelaide to co-host the breakfast show on SAFM with Paul Gale and James Brayshaw in March 1998.

In 2007, after a three-year break from radio, she began work at 5AA, hosting the afternoon program. She resigned from 5AA in May 2012 to spend more time with her family, with her last show being on 8 June. In 2022, she revealed that she has a foster child, Jayden.
