= David Ross (minister) =

Scottish-born minister of the Free Church of Scotland

David Ross

David Ross (1857–1931) was a Scottish minister of the Free Church of Scotland who emigrated to Australia and founded Scotch College, Perth

== Life ==
He was born on 13 August 1857 in Rosskeen near Invergordon the son of Hugh Ross, a saddler, and his wife, Jessie Hood. He studied at Aberdeen University then trained as a minister of the Free Church of Scotland at New College, Edinburgh from 1877 to 1881. He was then licensed to preach by the Free Church of Scotland and assisted the Rev Charles Salmond at St Matthew's Free Church in Glasgow.

He was ordained at the Free Kirk in Crathie in 1883. In 1892 he emigrated to Australia, settling in Perth. He initially served as minister of St Andrews Presbyterian Church in Perth. In 1896 he was elected Moderator of the General Assembly of the Presbyterian Church of Western Australia. During his period as Moderator he was invited to found the Scotch College in Perth, which opened in January 1897.

He became minister of St Kilda West Presbyterian Church in 1899. In 1919 he served as Moderator of the Presbyterian Church of Victoria.

He retired in 1930 aged 73. He died a few months after retiring, on 4 March 1931 in Victoria.

== Family ==
In 1883 he married Georgina Elizabeth Thomson (d.1901), daughter of Rev John Thomson of Leith, at Altrincham in Cheshire, England. Their daughter Ethel Isobel Ross died in 1928.
