= Angus Brayshaw =

Australian rules footballer (born 1996)

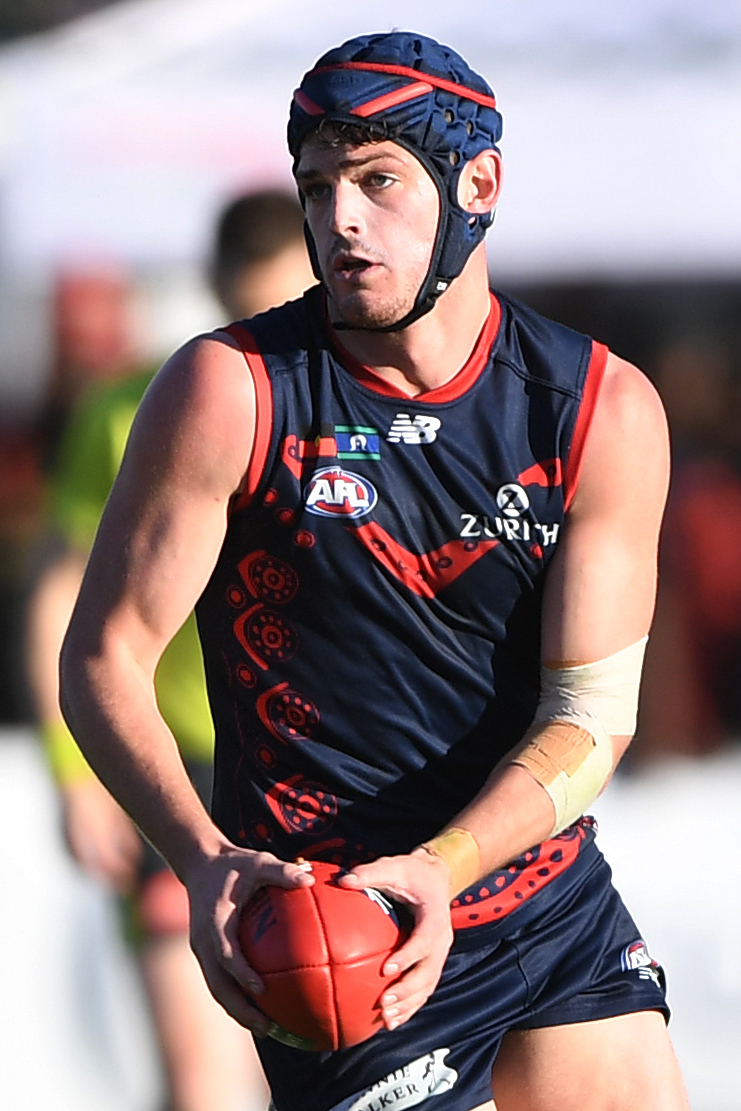
- Brayshaw with Melbourne in July 2019

Personal information
- Full name: Angus Brayshaw
- Born: 9 January 1996 (age 30); Western Australia
- Original team: Sandringham Dragons (TAC Cup) /Haileybury (APS)
- Draft: No. 3, 2014 national draft
- Debut: Round 1, 2015, Melbourne vs. Gold Coast, at MCG
- Height: 188 cm (6 ft 2 in)
- Weight: 92 kg (203 lb)
- Position: Midfielder / defender

Playing career^{1}
Years	Club	Games (Goals)
2015–2023	Melbourne	167 (49)
- ^{1} Playing statistics correct to the end of 2023.

Career highlights
- AFL premiership player: 2021; 22under22 team: 2018; 2015 AFL Rising Star nominee

Angus Brayshaw (born 9 January 1996) is a former professional Australian rules footballer who played for the Melbourne Football Club in the Australian Football League (AFL). A midfielder, 1.88 metres (6 ft 2 in) tall and weighing 92 kilograms (203 lb), Brayshaw was a capable contributor as both an inside and outside midfielder. He has strong family connections in Australian sport, with his father, Mark Brayshaw, a former North Melbourne player and the current AFL Coaches' Association Chief Executive Officer; his uncle James Brayshaw a former state cricketer, former North Melbourne chairman, and a sports media personality; and his paternal grandfather, Ian Brayshaw, a former state cricketer and footballer with the Claremont Football Club. His younger brother, Andrew, plays for Fremantle and his other younger brother, Hamish, used to play for West Coast but now plays for East Perth in the West Australian Football League (WAFL).

Brayshaw played top-level football early when he played in the TAC Cup for the Sandringham Dragons as a bottom-aged player, in addition to representing Victoria at under-16 level, and continued to represent the state which culminated in selection for Vic Metro in the 2014 AFL Under 18 Championships. His achievements at junior level included the most valuable player award at state level, the best-on-ground academy player, and selection in the All-Australian team and TAC Cup team of the year. He was recruited by Melbourne with the third overall selection in the 2014 AFL draft and he made his debut during the 2015 season, resulting in a fifth-place finish in the AFL Rising Star award.

After a nearly decade-long career spanning 167 games, a third-place finish in the 2018 Brownlow Medal, as well as a premiership win in 2021, Brayshaw was forced into early retirement in February 2024 due to the ongoing effects of concussion.

== Early life ==
Brayshaw was born to Mark and Debra Brayshaw in Western Australia. He was born into a sporting family with his paternal grandfather, Ian, representing Western Australia in cricket and is a premiership player with Western Australian Football League club Claremont. His uncle James played first-class cricket for Western Australia and South Australia, and his father played 32 matches for the North Melbourne Football Club.

Brayshaw attended Haileybury College and played his junior football with the Hampton Rovers Football Club. He was recognised as an elite talent at a young age when he received a scholarship with the Australian Institute of Sport through the AIS-AFL Academy as part of their level one squad in the 2012 intake. In the same year, he was selected to play with Vic Metro in the under-16 championships and was awarded the most valuable player for Vic Metro.

He played five matches as a bottom-aged player in the TAC Cup for the Sandringham Dragons in 2013 and after being ineligible for the 2013 AFL draft by missing the age cut-off date by nine days, Brayshaw spent 2014 competing in junior competitions and studying a double degree in commerce and engineering at Monash University. He was selected as part of the level two squad in the 2013 intake for the AIS-AFL Academy and travelled to Europe for two weeks in April 2014 with a 31-man squad. At the start of the tour, Brayshaw was awarded the MCC Chairman's Medal as the best academy player after competing in a match against Collingwood's Victorian Football League (VFL) side at the Melbourne Cricket Ground.

He has very few flaws in his game. He’s about as complete a player as there is in the draft.

— Ryan O'Connor, Sandringham talent manager.

Playing for the Sandringham Dragons in the TAC Cup in 2014, Brayshaw was regarded as one of the top draft prospects for the 2014 AFL draft and was appointed captain of Sandringham. He earned mid-year state honours through selection for Vic Metro in the Under 18 Championships and was rewarded with All-Australian selection as a half-back flanker. In addition, his efforts in the TAC Cup saw him secure a spot in the team of the year as a ruck-rover.

Brayshaw was highly rated among recruiters in his final junior year and was likened to Geelong captain, Joel Selwood, for his "fearless attack on the ball", he was also rated as a potential number one draft pick by AFL national talent manager, Kevin Sheehan. He was appraised as the player who would have the biggest impact in their first season due to his body size and natural leadership.

== AFL career ==
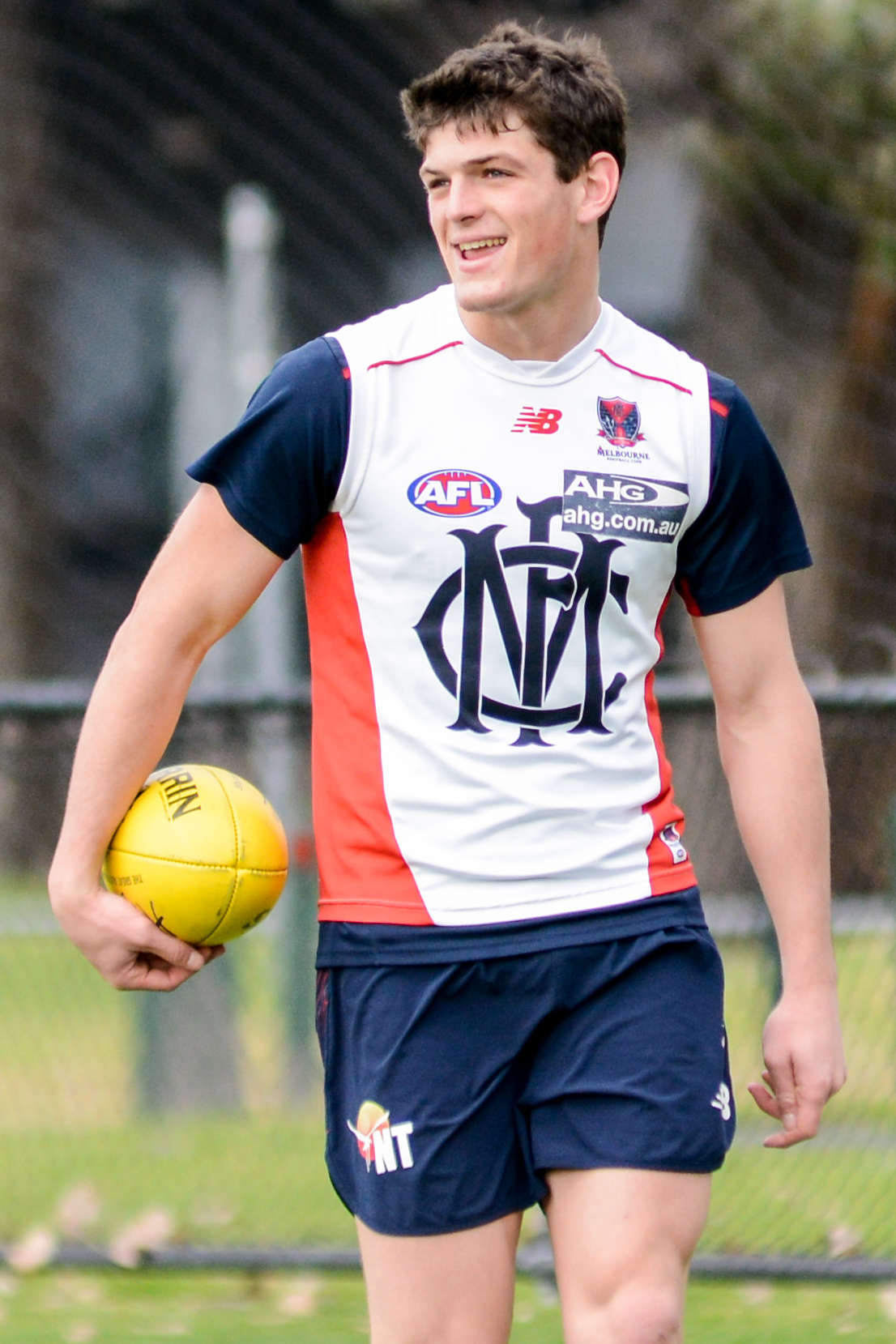
Brayshaw at training in July 2015

Brayshaw was linked to the Melbourne Football Club in the weeks leading to the draft and was ultimately recruited by the club with their second selection and third overall in the 2014 national draft. He was predicted to make a Round 1 debut after strong performances with Melbourne's affiliate team, the Casey Scorpions, in Victorian Football League (VFL) practice matches despite not featuring for Melbourne in the NAB Challenge. He debuted in the 26-point win against Gold Coast at the Melbourne Cricket Ground in Round 1 and laid a match-high nine tackles before being substituted off in the fourth quarter. After a string of consistent performances, he was awarded the Round 10 nomination for the Rising Star for his efforts in the annual Queen's Birthday Clash against Collingwood, in which he recorded eighteen disposals, six tackles, seven inside-50s, four goal assists, and a goal. His performance was praised by former Melbourne captain Garry Lyon, and he predicted that Brayshaw would be a "200-gamer and leader of the Demons."

Brayshaw missed only one match during his debut season due to being rested against Fremantle at Domain Stadium in Round 22. His season was acclaimed within the AFL industry, particularly his mid-season form, where his tenacity and desperation around the ball was highlighted with comparisons to Joel Selwood, in addition to former Brisbane Lions captain, Jonathan Brown, commending his toughness. He was noted as an equal favourite for the Rising Star, alongside Carlton midfielder Patrick Cripps, by Herald Sun chief football writer, Mark Robinson, after his performance against Geelong in Round 12. He ultimately finished fifth in the award after a drop in form in the second half of the season. He was recognised among his peers by finishing second in the AFL Players Association best first year player award, behind Sydney midfielder, Isaac Heeney; furthermore, he finished eleventh in Melbourne's best and fairest count.

Brayshaw was highly rated by the AFL players heading into the 2016 season, whereby he was named the second-best player in the league recruited from the 2014 and 2015 drafts. In the opening match of the 2016 NAB Challenge against Port Adelaide, he injured his knee five seconds into the match after a tackle from Port Adelaide midfielder Hamish Hartlett, and the injury forced him to miss the remainder of the pre-season competition. In a bid to play in the Round 1 match against Greater Western Sydney, he played for Casey in a VFL practice match, where he recorded 17 disposals and a goal. He ultimately missed the Round 1 win against Greater Western Sydney and played his first AFL match for the season in Round 2 in the 13-point loss against Essendon at the Melbourne Cricket Ground, where he recorded nine disposals. He was omitted the next week for the match against North Melbourne at Blundstone Arena due to looking "tired".

Brayshaw returned the next week and played in the Round 4 and 5 wins against Collingwood and Richmond, in which he garnered fifteen and nine disposals, respectively, before being dropped again for the Round 6 match against St Kilda at Etihad Stadium. The same weekend in the VFL match against Essendon, he sustained a concussion after a football kicked by teammate, Alex Neal-Bullen, hit him in the back of the head. Two weeks later, he suffered a second concussion when he had a head clash in the VFL match against Sandringham and he was placed on the sidelines for an "extended period of time". He played his first match in four weeks when he played for Casey against North Ballarat, where he accumulated twenty-nine disposals and kicked two goals. He returned to the senior side in the thirty-six point loss against St Kilda at Etihad Stadium in Round 17 in which he recorded twenty-three disposals and seven clearances. He played the remainder of the season and finished with ten matches in total for the season, which saw him fall to twenty-third in Melbourne's best and fairest count.

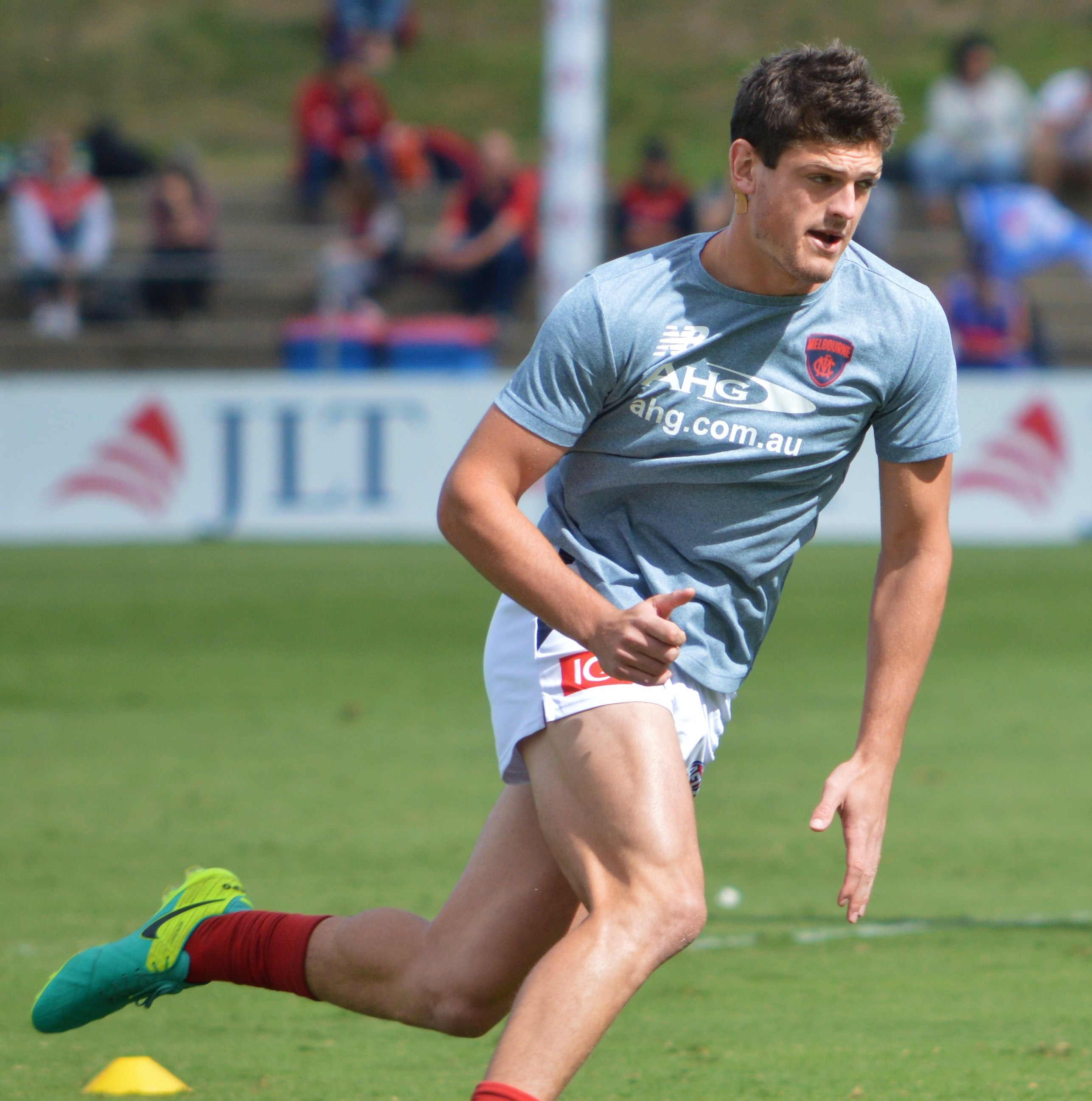
Brayshaw warming up prior to a pre-season match in February 2017

Brayshaw had a reduced workload in the 2017 pre-season after injuring his calf in January and played the first two matches of the AFL season before he was omitted from the senior side for the Round 3 match against Geelong at Etihad Stadium. AFL Media reporter, Ben Guthrie, noted the calf injury was a key reason for his slow start to the season and he was yet to live up to his potential due to persistent injuries throughout his early career. Former Melbourne coach, Paul Roos, noted that although the public hadn't seen Brayshaw's best yet, he was Melbourne's most exciting prospect for 2017. In late April playing in the VFL, he received his third concussion in twelve months after receiving a bump from North Ballarat player, Hayden Walters. There were suggestions by the media that the multiple concussions in a short period of time would prematurely end his AFL career, however, these claims were quickly dismissed by Melbourne with head of football, Josh Mahoney, saying it was only a minor concussion.

Brayshaw missed three weeks of football and in his return match in the VFL against the Northern Blues, he was concussed again when he was bumped by Carlton listed player, Jed Lamb. With the club saying they would "map out a plan" to ensure he could play consistent football without the risk of concussion, reports emerged that the club had granted him indefinite leave to recover from his fourth concussion in twelve months. He was training two days after the reports emerged, with senior coach, Simon Goodwin, stating the reports of indefinite leave were inaccurate but Brayshaw would not return to playing for a while. He missed nine weeks of football before returning in the VFL Round 14 match against Essendon, wearing a helmet after receiving advice from former St Kilda player Nathan Burke, who received multiple bumps during his career. He returned to the AFL for the twenty-four point win against St Kilda in Round 21 at the Melbourne Cricket Ground; in the first quarter, he received a heavy bump from Koby Stevens; however, he was uninjured from the collision. Former player and a commentator during the match, Jason Dunstall, noted all the commentators were worried straight after the bump, but Brayshaw recovered and "used the ball well and made good decisions. [Dunstall] thought it was a fantastic fight back from when we had our heart in our mouths" and he was named in Melbourne's best players by AFL Media, the Herald Sun and The Age. He played the remainder of the season and finished with five AFL matches.

Brayshaw's performances during the 2018 AFL season showed the competition what he is capable of, averaging a career-high 26.1 disposals and kicking 14 goals for the season, with the Demons having vastly improved season, eventually making the preliminary final. Brayshaw's 2018 season was highlighted with a 37-disposal, 3-goal game against the Adelaide Crows in Round 10 as well as a career-high of 39 disposals and a goal the next week. His season was capped off with a 3rd-place finish in the 2018 Brownlow medal, polling 21 votes.

In 2021, Brayshaw played in Melbourne's premiership winning team, as Melbourne broke a 57 year premiership drought with a 74 point victory over the Western Bulldogs in the 2021 AFL Grand Final at Perth Stadium.

In the 2023 Qualifying Final, Brayshaw was concussed after being struck in the head in an attempted smother by Collingwood player Brayden Maynard. Brayshaw was substituted off immediately and was unable to play in the Demons' semi-final the following week; while Maynard was referred to the AFL Tribunal and ultimately cleared, causing controversy. It was Brayshaw's last game: after training with the club through the subsequent preseason, he retired two weeks prior to the start of the 2024 season due to his ongoing concussion issues.

== Statistics ==
Legend
G	Goals	K	Kicks	D	Disposals	T	Tackles
B	Behinds	H	Handballs	M	Marks

Season	Team	No.	Games	Totals							Averages (per game)							Votes
Season	Team	No.	Games	G	B	K	H	D	M	T	G	B	K	H	D	M	T	Votes
2015	Melbourne	10	21	5	3	170	97	267	54	99	0.2	0.1	8.1	4.6	12.7	2.6	4.7	0
2016	Melbourne	10	10	7	2	83	93	176	30	42	0.7	0.2	8.3	9.3	17.6	3.0	4.2	0
2017	Melbourne	10	5	2	1	53	42	95	28	12	0.4	0.2	10.6	8.4	19.0	5.6	2.4	0
2018	Melbourne	10	22	14	10	322	252	574	108	99	0.6	0.5	14.6	11.5	26.1	4.9	4.5	21
2019	Melbourne	10	22	9	7	278	209	487	87	96	0.4	0.3	12.6	9.5	22.1	4.0	4.4	0
2020 (Note: The 2020 season was played with 17 home-and-away matches per team (down from 22) and 16-minute quarters with time on (down from 20-minute quarters with time on) due to the impact of the COVID-19 pandemic.)	Melbourne	10	14	5	6	116	117	233	40	41	0.4	0.4	8.3	8.4	16.6	2.9	2.9	1
2021^{#}	Melbourne	10	25	3	7	274	186	460	105	61	0.1	0.3	11.0	7.4	18.4	4.2	2.4	0
2022	Melbourne	10	24	2	1	401	211	612	170	54	0.1	0.0	16.7	8.8	25.5	7.1	2.3	7
2023	Melbourne	10	24	2	5	279	269	548	93	79	0.1	0.2	11.6	11.2	22.8	3.9	3.3	4
Career			167	49	42	1976	1477	3453	715	583	0.3	0.3	11.8	8.8	20.7	4.3	3.5	33

== Honours and achievements ==
Team

- AFL premiership player (Melbourne): 2021
- McClelland Trophy (Melbourne): 2021, 2023
- AFL minor premiership (Melbourne): 2021

Individual

- 22under22 team: 2018
- AFL Rising Star nominee: 2015 (Round 10)
