= Chris Sabburg =

Australian cricketer

Personal information
- Full name: Christopher John Martin Sabburg
- Born: 2 January 1990 (age 36); Gatton, Queensland, Australia
- Batting: Left-handed
- Bowling: Right-arm off break
- Role: Batting all-rounder
- Relatives: Andy Bichel (cousin); Dirk Tazelaar (uncle)

Domestic team information
- Years: Team
- 2012/13–2013/14: Brisbane Heat (squad no. 22)
- 2021/22: Perth Scorchers (squad no. 24)
- T20 debut: 12 January 2013 Brisbane Heat v Hobart Hurricanes
- Last T20: 14 January 2022 Perth Scorchers v Adelaide Strikers

Career statistics
Competition	Twenty20
Matches	12
Runs scored	69
Batting average	13.80
100s/50s	0/0
Top score	19*
Balls bowled	6
Wickets	0
Bowling average	–
5 wickets in innings	–
10 wickets in match	–
Best bowling	–
Catches/stumpings	8/–
- Source: ESPNcricinfo, 8 August 2025

Christopher John Martin Sabburg (born 2 January 1990) is an Australian cricketer. He played two seasons for Brisbane Heat in the Big Bash League in 2012 to 2014, before being added to the Perth Scorchers squad in 2022 as a COVID-19 replacement player.

Born to parents of German ancestry, Sabburg was considered one of the best fieldsman in Queensland even though he wasn't a full-time cricketer. He still managed to impress Brisbane Heat coach to earn a spot in the team for two seasons. He never got to bowl or bat in his first season, but he took five catches and played his part in Brisbane Heat's winning campaign in 2012–13 Big Bash League.

Sabburg made his debut for Perth Scorchers in January 2022, when Colin Munro was ruled out after testing positive to COVID-19. He came in to bat with Perth needing eight runs to win, and scored seven runs from only three balls, including the winning runs.

He first became a notable player after he took a successful catch to dismiss Kevin Pietersen on the 4th day of the first Test between England and Australia in 2013. Sabburg was fielding at fine leg for only two deliveries when Ryan Harris left the field for a short time. Pietersen hit a short ball from Mitchell Johnson towards fine leg where it was caught by Sabburg sprinting from the boundary to secure a catch. Pietersen was dismissed for 26 and Australia went on to win the game by 381 runs. Sabburg said after the game: "It wasn't a very hard catch, to be honest. I just had to do the simple things and catch it. All the boys got around so it was pretty awesome. I was hoping 'Harry' was going to stay off ... I wanted to stay on." It also was not the first time substitute fielders were notably used in a Test between England and Australia. In 2005 at Trent Bridge England's substitute fielder Gary Pratt famously ran out Ricky Ponting.
