= 1987–88 Sheffield Shield season =

Australian cricket tournament

- Cricket format: First-class
- Tournament format(s): Double round-robin & Final
- Champions: Western Australia (11th title)
- Participants: 6
- Matches: 31
- Player of the series: Mark Waugh (New South Wales) & Dirk Tazelaar (Queensland)
- Most runs: Graeme Wood (Western Australia) (1014)
- Most wickets: Chris Matthews (Western Australia) (56)

The 1987–88 Sheffield Shield season was the 86th season of the Sheffield Shield, the domestic first-class cricket competition of Australia. Western Australia won the championship.

== Table ==
Team	Played	Won	Lost	Tied	Drawn	N/R	Points
Western Australia	10	6	2	0	2	0	40
Queensland	10	5	3	0	2	0	32
New South Wales	10	4	4	0	2	0	24
Victoria	10	2	1	0	7	0	22
South Australia	10	2	4	0	4	0	16
Tasmania	10	1	6	0	3	0	6

== Final ==
Queensland	v	Western Australia (H)
289; Chris Matthews 8/101		344; Graeme Wood 141; Carl Rackemann 5/69
216; Terry Alderman 6/91		162/5

Western Australia win by 5 wickets.
Venue: Perth

== Statistics ==
=== Most Runs ===
Graeme Wood 1014

=== Most Wickets ===
Chris Matthews 56
