= Mark Brayshaw =

Australian rules footballer

Personal information
- Full name: Mark Andrew Brayshaw
- Born: 5 February 1966 (age 60)
- Original team: Scotch College / North Beach
- Height: 187 cm (6 ft 2 in)
- Weight: 85 kg (187 lb)

Playing career^{1}
Years	Club	Games (Goals)
1984–1989, 1994	Claremont	110 (70)
1990–1992	North Melbourne	32 (2)
- ^{1} Playing statistics correct to the end of 1992.

Mark Andrew Brayshaw (born 5 February 1966) is a former Australian rules footballer who played for the North Melbourne Football Club in the AFL. He is the brother of James Brayshaw and the son of Ian Brayshaw. His sons Angus, Andrew and Hamish have all played in the AFL.

== Playing career ==
=== Claremont Football Club ===
Brayshaw began and ended his career with Claremont Football Club in the West Australian Football League. In a career that began in 1984 and ended in 1994, Brayshaw played 110 games for the club and kicked 70 goals. He was drafted by North Melbourne Football Club in the 1989 VFL draft. Brayshaw returned to Claremont in 1994, playing 20 WAFL matches.

=== North Melbourne Football Club ===
In the 1989 VFL Draft, Mark was selected as first round selection (pick number 6 overall) by North Melbourne Football Club. Mark would go on to play 32 games for the club and kick two goals for the club before being delisted by the club at the end of 1992.

== Post-football career ==
Brayshaw was the chief executive officer of the Richmond Football Club from 2000 until 2004. He had previously worked in marketing roles for AFL clubs Port Adelaide and Fremantle. Mark is currently a board member of North Melbourne Football Club, alongside his brother James.

Mark is the former CEO of the AFL Coaches Association. The AFL coaches association is a representative body for AFL coaches, from junior level right up to the elite level.

His focus was on supporting the work of AFL coaches from all levels of football.

Post AFL involvement he has started a company specializing in medicinal cannabis and has some high profile ex AFL clients who have reduced or eliminated pain with the medically prescribed product.

== Family ==
Mark is married to Deborah and his three sons have all played in the AFL. Angus was drafted in 2014 by the Melbourne Football Club, and in 2017, Andrew was drafted by Fremantle and Hamish was drafted by West Coast.

In an accident on 20 September 2006, his 36-year-old sister Sally was killed instantly after the facade of her garage collapsed on top of her.
