= Ian Brayshaw =

Australian rules footballer (born 1942)

Personal information
- Full name: Ian James Brayshaw
- Born: 14 January 1942 (age 84); South Perth, Western Australia
- Nickname: Sticks
- Batting: Right-handed
- Bowling: Right-arm medium
- Role: All-rounder
- Relatives: James Brayshaw (son); Mark Brayshaw (son); Angus Brayshaw (grandson); Andrew Brayshaw (grandson); Hamish Brayshaw (grandson)

Domestic team information
- Years: Team
- 1960/61–1977/78: Western Australia

Career statistics
Competition	First-class	List A
Matches	101	19
Runs scored	4,325	245
Batting average	31.80	22.27
100s/50s	3/26	0/2
Top score	160	58*
Balls bowled	11,625	704
Wickets	178	17
Bowling average	25.08	24.47
5 wickets in innings	7	0
10 wickets in match	2	0
Best bowling	10/44	3/28
Catches/stumpings	108/–	3/–
- Source: CricketArchive, 1 October 2014

Ian James Brayshaw (born 14 January 1942) is a former Australian sportsman. He played both Australian rules football and cricket. Both his sons, Mark and James, were noted athletes in their respective sports, and three of his grandsons have been members of AFL squads.

== Career ==
=== Football ===
He played Australian rules football at a high level, winning a premiership with Claremont in the Western Australian Football League (WAFL), but is best known for his cricket career.

=== Cricket ===
A right-handed all-rounder, Brayshaw played over 100 first-class games for Western Australia, and captained the side on several occasions. Against Victoria during the 1967–68 Sheffield Shield season, he accomplished one of cricket's rarest feats, taking ten wickets in an innings. He is the most recent Australian to do so, as of June 2024.

=== Media ===
Brayshaw later worked in the media with ABC and Channel Ten in Western Australia. He was the expert commentator on ABC Radio when Trevor Chappell bowled the infamous underarm ball during a one-day match between Australia and New Zealand.

=== Writing ===
Brayshaw has co-authored several sporting books, including The ABC of Cricket; The Black Pearl: No Regrets; Caught Marsh, Bowled Lillee: The Legend Lives On; The Elements of Cricket; and Round The Wicket: A Selection of Cricket Stories. In 2021, he self-published his first novel, a romance novel entitled Terms of Repayment.

== Family ==
Brayshaw is the father of James Brayshaw, a former state cricketer with Western Australia and South Australia, media personality on Seven Network, and former chairman of the North Melbourne Football Club; and Mark Brayshaw, a former Claremont and North Melbourne footballer. Mark's sons Angus, Andrew and Hamish have all been on AFL squads, with the latter being delisted at the end of the 2020 AFL season.

In an accident on 20 September 2006, his 36-year-old daughter Sally was killed instantly after the facade of her garage collapsed on top of her.
