= Dirk Tazelaar =

Australian cricketer

Cricket information
- Batting: Right-handed
- Bowling: Left-arm fast-medium

Career statistics
Competition	First-class	List A
Matches	83	25
Runs scored	958	89
Batting average	14.51	12.71
100s/50s	0/1	0/0
Top score	56	22*
Balls bowled	17,394	1,325
Wickets	287	31
Bowling average	28.23	27.09
5 wickets in innings	9	0
10 wickets in match	1	0
Best bowling	6/48	3/18
Catches/stumpings	39/–	9/–
- Source: Cricinfo, 12 January 2023

Dirk Tazelaar (born 13 January 1963) is a former Australian first class cricketer who played for Queensland. A tall left arm paceman, he also had a stint in England with Surrey.

His best season for Queensland came in 1987–88 when he shared with Mark Waugh the award for State Player of the Year.

== Career ==
Tazelaar was a talented sportsman as a child. He played rugby league for the Ipswich Jets. When John Maguire and Carl Rackemann signed to go on the South African rebel tours in 1985, it opened up spots for bowlers in the Queensland team and encouraged Tazelaar to pick cricket over league.

He made his first class debut in 1985–86. He took 3–84 in his first game, against NSW. In a game against Tasmania, he and Jeff Thomson put on 56 runs in 27 minutes. He also took several wickets, inspiring captain Kepler Wessels to say "He bowled beautifully. He got good pace, a lot of bounce and with a bit more luck would have had some more wickets."

Tazelaar played for Queensland in the Sheffield Shield final, where NSW managed to escape with a draw, giving them the Shield (because they were top of the table). Tazelaar took 3-48 and 2-57. He took 13 wickets at 32.15 for the season.

Tazelaar began the following season well, taking 5-94 including the wickets of Ian Botham, Alan Lamb, John Emburey and Phillip de Freitas in a Qld vs England game. He bowled well in the summer and was picked in the Prime Minister's XI. Queensland were unable to make the Sheffield Shield final. Tazelaar took 33 wickets at 35.78.

Tazelaar had a strong 1987–88 season and was beginning to be discussed as a test prospect. He took a career best 6–52 against WA. "It feels really good to finally get five wickets in an innings," he said. "I've had a lot of threes and fours but this is my first five bag, or for that matter six... I've had 2'/2 seasons of Shield cricket and next step up from state cricket is to the Test arena. If I did get a chance I'm pretty confident of bowling well."

It was Mike Whitney however who was called up. Later on Merv Hughes was preferred for the Bicentennial Test although his figures were not as good as Tazelaar's.

Tazelaar scored his first 50 with the bat against NSW, and took 8–86 against Tasmania,

Queensland made the Sheffield Shield final but lost to WA. Tazelaar gave them a hope of victory taking 3-4 off 11 balls but it was not enough to win the game.

He took 46 wickets at 22.52 for the summer and won joint Sheffield Shield player of the year. However, he was not picked for Australia.

Highlights of the 1988-89 summer included 10–80 against Victoria. He was dropped for one game in favor of John Maguire.

He took 36 first class wickets for the summer at 24.69. However, he was not picked on the 1989 Ashes. Queensland narrowly missed the Sheffield Shield final.

Tazelaar did play county cricket in England in 1989. He took 10 wickets at 41.7. In one game he was stopped from bowling due to interference. He was injured during the season and did not play many games.

In 1989-90 Tazelaar took 22 wickets at 31.95. Highlights included 6–48 against Tasmania. In 1990-91 he took 23 wickets at 38.52. A back injury saw him retire from the game.

Tazelaar returned to first class cricket in 1992–93 with a remodelled bowling action. He took 22 wickets at 25.63. His back injury did flare up during the season.

Tazelaar came back a second time from injury in 1993–94. He took 11 wickets at 26.63.

== Post-playing career ==
In the early 2000s, he was a selector for Queensland.

== Personal life ==
Tazelaar's son Andrew was a spin bowler who played for the Queensland Under 19 side. Chris Sabburg is his nephew. Tazelaar went to work in the building industry.
