= Andrew Brayshaw =

Australian rules footballer (born 1999)

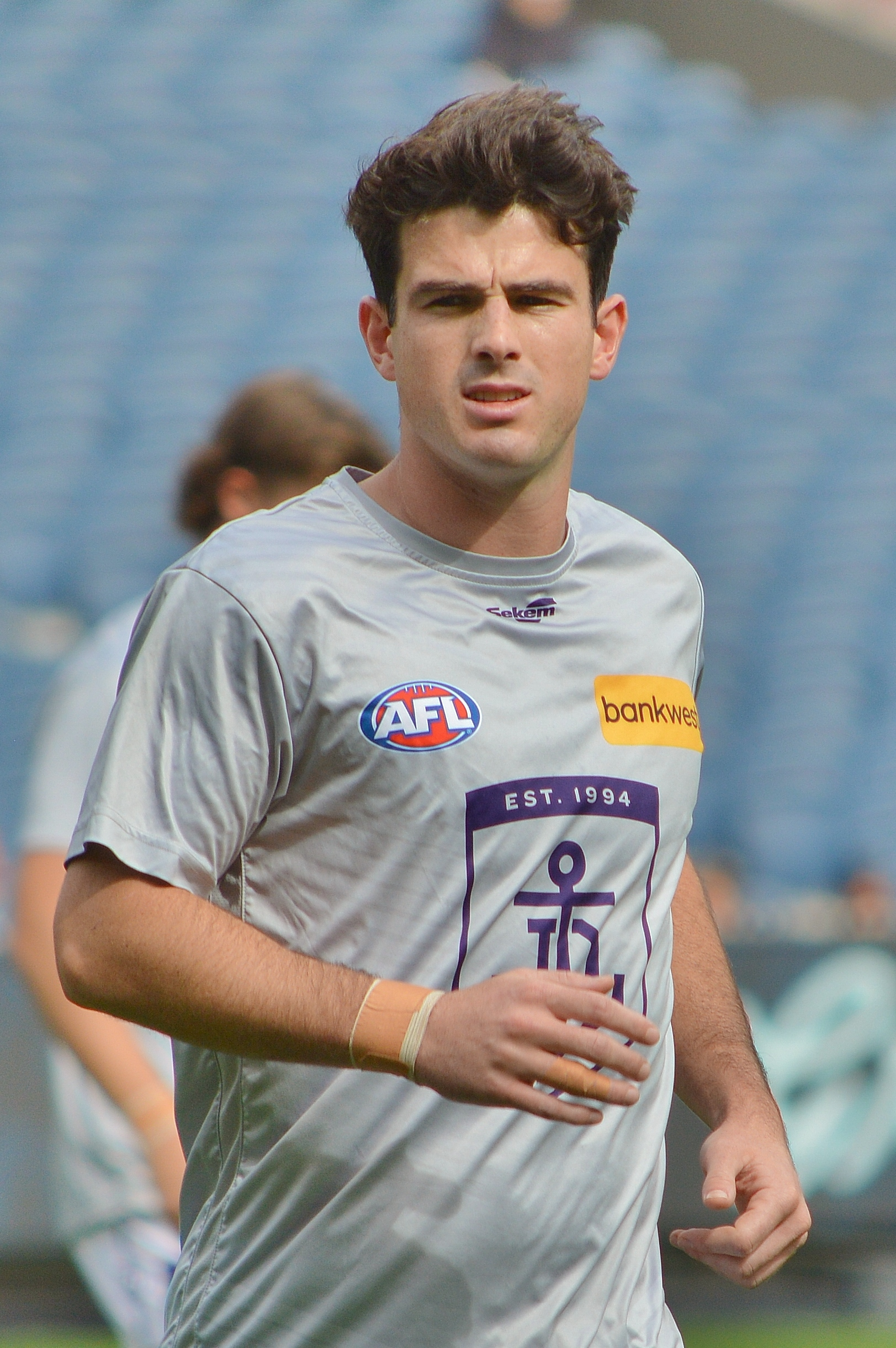
- Brayshaw in April 2025

Personal information
- Nickname: Snea
- Born: 8 November 1999 (age 26); Adelaide, South Australia
- Original team: Sandringham Dragons (TAC Cup)/Hampton Rovers
- Draft: No. 2, 2017 national draft
- Height: 185 cm (6 ft 1 in)
- Weight: 86 kg (190 lb)
- Position: Midfielder

Club information
- Current club: Fremantle
- Number: 8

Playing career^{1}
Years	Club	Games (Goals)
2018–	Fremantle	196 (64)
- ^{1} Playing statistics correct to the end of the preliminary finals, 2026.

Career highlights
- Leigh Matthews Trophy: 2022; Doig Medal: 2022; All-Australian team: 2022; 3× 22under22 team: 2020, 2021, 2022 (c); 2x Geoff Christian Medal: 2021, 2022; Fremantle co-vice captain: 2023–; Arthur Leggett Medal: 2025

Andrew Brayshaw (born 8 November 1999) is a professional Australian rules footballer and the co-vice-captain of the Fremantle Football Club in the Australian Football League (AFL).

== Early career ==
Andrew was born in Adelaide, South Australia to parents Mark and Debra Brayshaw, as the youngest of four brothers. Brayshaw grew up in the south-eastern suburbs of Melbourne, Victoria. After an impressive junior career for his school, Haileybury, TAC Cup side Sandringham Dragons and the Victorian Metropolitan representative side, he was recruited by Fremantle with the second overall selection in the 2017 AFL draft. Having been drafted on a two-year contract, Brayshaw signed an additional two-year extension in December of the same year, to remain at Fremantle until at least 2021.

== AFL career ==
=== 2018: Debut season ===
After a series of impressive pre-season games, Brayshaw made his AFL debut for Fremantle in the opening round of the 2018 AFL season against Port Adelaide at Adelaide Oval. He was one of two first-year Fremantle players to make their debut in Round 1, alongside fellow 2017 draftee Bailey Banfield. He had 12 disposals, 8 handballs, and 2 tackles during the match. In Round 16 against Melbourne, Brayshaw suffered a groin injury, causing him to miss the next two games. He had played every game up until that point. He returned to the Dockers' line-up in Round 19 against Hawthorn, collecting a career-best 25 disposals and kicking a goal. His debut season was cut short when, in Round 20, he was struck by West Coast Eagles player Andrew Gaff in an off-the-ball incident. Gaff was subsequently suspended for eight AFL matches, while Brayshaw suffered a fractured jaw and three dislodged teeth.

=== 2019–2020 ===
Brayshaw returned to full training during the 2019 pre-season, and played in both of Fremantle's practice matches against Collingwood and West Coast. He had a strong 20-disposal, 14-handball game in Round 1 against North Melbourne, followed by a game-high 10 tackles (both a career-best and an equal season-high) the following week in Round 2 against Gold Coast. In Round 19, Brayshaw was Fremantle's best player in a disappointing 47-point loss to the Western Bulldogs at Marvel Stadium; he collected a career-best 26 disposals, 17 kicks, and kicked a team-high 3 goals and earning him the first Brownlow Medal vote of his career, despite polling the sixth-most coaches' votes. Brayshaw finished his second season having played every game, and a top 10 finish in Fremantle's best and fairest award, the Doig Medal.

Coming off a career-best season in 2019, Brayshaw had another consistent year in the shortened 2020 AFL season. He played every game and led the team for disposals, averaging 20 per match (in shortened quarters), tackles, and handballs. He also significantly improved his kicking efficiency from 43.1% in 2019 to 62.8%, rating him 10th in the competition for inside midfielders who played 10 games or more. In Round 11, he played the best game of his career in a best on ground performance against Hawthorn. He recorded 33 disposals — both a game-high and a then-career-high — which was the most of any Fremantle player for the season. He polled the maximum 3 Brownlow votes, 9 coaches' votes, and was rated the highest-ranked player on-field by Champion Data. Coach Justin Longmuir said of his performance: “I thought today was clearly his best four quarter performance and it’s great reward for effort because everything he does, he does at a hundred mile[s] an hour and he does it with a real purpose, so it was great to see him get the rewards." He played his 50th game the following week against Carlton.

Brayshaw finished fourth in the Doig Medal count, behind medalist Luke Ryan, runner-up Nat Fyfe, and the third-placed Adam Cerra. He polled 150 votes (the same as Cerra) but was relegated to fourth due to Fremantle’s tiebreaker rules, which uses games polled to determine the final order when players are equal on votes. He received his first 22 Under 22 team selection at the season's end, named on the interchange bench. Brayshaw signed a four-year contract extension in December, keeping him at Fremantle until at least 2025.

=== 2021–2022 ===
Brayshaw started the 2021 AFL season in excellent form, recording 29 disposals and 1 goal in Round 1 against Melbourne, and 32 disposals and 2 goals the following week against Greater Western Sydney. His next two games were slightly down on numbers, recording a combined 34 disposals for both games while being heavily targeted by opposition taggers. Brayshaw returned to form in his next three games, combining for 96 disposals. He was Fremantle's best player in Round 20 against Sydney, recording 34 disposals — both a career-high and game-high — 20 handballs and 14 kicks. He was the best player on ground the following week in a four-point win over Richmond, recording career-best numbers in disposals, tackles and handballs. He polled a perfect 10 coaches' votes and a perfect 3 Brownlow votes. In Round 21, he was found guilty of making unreasonable eye contact to Jarrod Berry of the Brisbane Lions and was given a one-game suspension. Fremantle challenged the ban at the AFL tribunal but was unsuccessful in getting it downgraded. Brayshaw finished the season having played all-but-one game. He once again led the team for disposals, handballs, and tackles and his average disposals per game improved significantly, from 19.94 to over 28. He was named in the 22 Under 22 team for the second year in a row, and finished third-place in Fremantle's best and fairest award, behind Sean Darcy and David Mundy.

Celebratory games
Year	Tally
2018	1st Game – Round 1 versus Port Adelaide
2020	50th Game – Round 12 versus Carlton
2022	100th Game – Semi Finals versus Collingwood
2025	150th Game* – Round 4 versus Western Bulldogs (*Life Membership)

In Round 2 of the 2022 AFL season, Brayshaw recorded career-best numbers in both disposals and kicks, with 40 and 26 respectively. The 2022 season would prove to be a break out season for Brayshaw, in which he played every game and won his first best and fairest award, the Doig Medal. Brayshaw also earnt his first All-Australian selection, named on the interchange bench of the 2022 All-Australian team. His career-best form throughout the season saw him as a front-runner for the Brownlow Medal, and arguably the best two-way midfielder in the competition. He finished the 2022 Brownlow Medal count polling equal-fourth with 25 votes. Brayshaw also finished the season with the sixth most disposals in the league, collecting 640 across 22 games. In February 2023, Brayshaw was named co-vice-captain of Fremantle, alongside Caleb Serong.

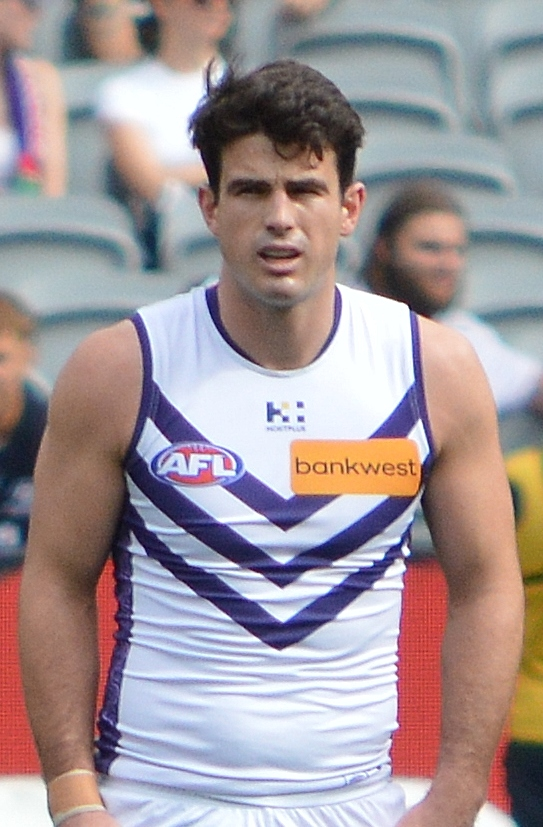
Brayshaw during the round 6 2025, AFL match between Melbourne and Fremantle at the MCG.

=== 2023–2025 ===
Brayshaw was one of Fremantle's best in Round 20 of the 2023 AFL season, during their 7-point win over Geelong at Kardinia Park, collecting 28 disposals. He finished the year as runner-up in Fremantle's best and fairest award, as well as having played every game for the second consecutive season. He was also second in the league for total disposals with 671 across 23 games, finishing just four disposals shy of league leader and fellow Fremantle co-vice-captain, Caleb Serong.

Brayshaw was impressive in Fremantle's opening game of the 2024 AFL season against the Brisbane Lions at Optus Stadium, collecting 32 disposals. He again made a significant impact the next week against North Melbourne at Marvel Stadium, collecting 27 disposals, four clearances and kicking a crucial goal in the third quarter. Brayshaw collected a game-high 38 disposals and seven tackles against Carlton during the Gather Round in Adelaide. Brayshaw collected a career-best 41 disposals in round 19, in Fremantle's 50-point win over the Melbourne Football Club at Optus Stadium. He would equal this record one month later, in the Dockers' narrow loss to the Greater Western Sydney Giants at the Sydney Showground. He finished the season having played every game for the third year in a row, and runner-up in Fremantle's best and fairest award. He was one of five Fremantle players named in the initial 44-man 2024 All-Australian squad. Brayshaw signed a six-year contract extension in March of 2025, tying him to Fremantle until at least 2031.

In Round 7 of the 2025 AFL season, Brayshaw was the inaugural recipient of the Arthur Leggett Medal after a best on ground performance against Adelaide in Fremantle's annual Len Hall Tribute game. The award was inaugurated just days before the match in honour of Sir Arthur Leslie Leggett, Western Australia's last surviving World War II prisoner of war. Leggett was heavily involved in the Len Hall Tribute game and had passed away just two weeks prior. Brayshaw once again played every game for the fourth year in a row, having not missed a game since his suspension in late 2021. He finished runner up in the Dockers' best and fairest award for the third year in a row, behind Caleb Serong, becoming the first player in club history to finish runner-up three times consecutively. Brayshaw was eligible to play for Victoria in the revised State of Origin game against Western Australia in February, 2026; however, he went unselected. He was the only player eligible to play for Victoria that finished top ten in the Brownlow to miss out on selection, despite having finished fifth, meaning four other players who all polled less Brownlow votes made the team.

== Personal life ==
Brayshaw's older brother Angus also played in the AFL for the Melbourne Demons and his other older brother Hamish previously played for the West Coast Eagles. His father, Mark Brayshaw, played for North Melbourne, his uncle, James, is a radio and television broadcaster and former cricketer and his grandfather Ian Brayshaw is a former state cricketer.

In January 2024, Brayshaw got engaged to long-time partner Lizzie Stock. They married in November of 2025.

== Statistics ==
Updated to the end of round 22, 2026.

Legend
G	Goals	K	Kicks	D	Disposals	T	Tackles
B	Behinds	H	Handballs	M	Marks

Season	Team	No.	Games	Totals							Averages (per game)							Votes
Season	Team	No.	Games	G	B	K	H	D	M	T	G	B	K	H	D	M	T	Votes
2018	Fremantle	8	17	5	5	127	144	271	49	75	0.3	0.3	7.5	8.5	15.9	2.9	4.4	0
2019	Fremantle	8	22	7	7	167	205	372	46	113	0.3	0.3	7.6	9.3	16.9	2.1	5.1	1
2020 (Note: The 2020 season was played with 17 home-and-away matches per team (down from 22) and 16-minute quarters with time on (down from 20-minute quarters with time on) due to the impact of the COVID-19 pandemic.)	Fremantle	8	17	0	3	148	191	339	48	83	0.0	0.2	8.7	11.2	19.9	2.8	4.9	9
2021	Fremantle	8	20	8	5	265	303	568	101	93	0.4	0.3	13.3	15.2	28.4	5.1	4.7	10
2022	Fremantle	8	24	12	12	354	350	704	112	149	0.5	0.5	14.8	14.6	29.3	4.7	6.2	25
2023	Fremantle	8	23	11	4	322	349	671	87	143	0.5	0.2	14.0	15.2	29.2	3.8	6.2	10
2024	Fremantle	8	23	7	12	305	365	670	99	117	0.3	0.5	13.3	15.9	29.1	4.3	5.1	22
2025	Fremantle	8	24	7	8	292	355	647	70	161	0.3	0.3	12.2	14.8	27.0	2.9	6.7	26
2026	Fremantle	8	21	5	5	239	280	519	70	126	0.2	0.2	11.4	13.3	24.7	3.3	6.0	0
Career			191	62	61	2219	2542	4761	682	1060	0.3	0.3	11.6	13.3	24.9	3.6	5.5	103

== Honours and achievements ==
Team

- AFL minor premiership: 2026 (Fremantle)

Individual

- 3× 22under22 team: 2020, 2021, 2022 (c)
- Geoff Christian Medal: 2021
- Leigh Matthews Trophy: 2022
- All-Australian team: 2022
- Doig Medal: 2022
- Arthur Leggett Medal: 2025
