= AFL Coaches Association =

Union for Australian Football League coaches

- Australian Football League Coaches Association
- Founded: 2002
- Key people: Alistair Nicholson (CEO)
- Website: aflca.com.au

The AFL Coaches Association (AFLCA) is the representative body for Australian Football League coaches.

== History ==
The AFLCA was founded in 2002, and as of 2015 had 178 members. Every year annually since 2003, the AFLCA has released a set of awards, mainly to players and coaches in the Australian Football League. Danny Frawley is a former CEO of the Association, stepping down from the role in 2014. He was replaced by Mark Brayshaw who served from 2015 to 2021. The current CEO is Alistair Nicholson who was appointed in March 2021. He's a former Melbourne Football Club player who since retirement served on the AFL Players' Association executive committee and more recently was the Australian Cricketers' Association CEO.
