= Hamish Brayshaw =

Australian rules footballer (born 1998)

Personal information
- Nickname: Hammer
- Born: 9 February 1998 (age 28); Australia
- Original teams: Sandringham Dragons, TAC Cup
- Draft: No. 68, 2017 AFL draft, West Coast
- Debut: 10 September 2020, West Coast vs. St Kilda, at The Gabba
- Height: 187 cm (6 ft 2 in)
- Weight: 103 kg (227 lb)
- Position: Midfielder

Club information
- Current club: East Perth
- Number: 22

Playing career^{1}
Years	Club	Games (Goals)
2018, 2022—	East Perth	88 (51)
2018–2020	West Coast (AFL)	1 (0)

Representative team honours
Years	Team	Games (Goals)
2022-	Western Australia	1 (0)
- ^{1} Playing statistics correct to the end of round 4, 2026.

Career highlights
- Sandover Medal: 2023; East Perth Best & Fairest: 2022; West Coast WAFL captain: 2021; East Perth co-captain: 2024

Hamish Brayshaw (9 February 1998) is an Australian rules footballer and multiple Guinness World Record holder, who played for the West Coast Eagles in the Australian Football League (AFL) and currently plays for East Perth in the West Australian Football League (WAFL).

The son of former North Melbourne player Mark Brayshaw and brother of Andrew and Angus, Brayshaw played junior football with Hampton Rovers and for his school Haileybury College.

Selected by West Coast with the 68th pick in the 2017 AFL draft, Brayshaw was delisted at the conclusion of the 2019 AFL season and redrafted with pick 39 in the 2020 rookie draft.

Brayshaw was again delisted by the Eagles at the conclusion of the 2020 AFL season. Afterwards he was signed as a WAFL-listed player at the West Coast Eagles and made captain of the club's WAFL team for the 2021 season. In early 2024 Hamish, with the assistance of former West Coast teammate Will Schofield and Dan Const from the BackChat podcast, set about breaking obscure Guinness World Records.

== Statistics ==
=== AFL statistics ===
Correct to the end of the 2020 season

Legend
G	Goals	K	Kicks	D	Disposals	T	Tackles
B	Behinds	H	Handballs	M	Marks

Season	Team	No.	Games	Totals							Averages (per game)						
Season	Team	No.	Games	G	B	K	H	D	M	T	G	B	K	H	D	M	T
2020	West Coast	22	1	0	1	3	2	5	1	1	0.0	1.0	3.0	2.0	5.0	1.0	1.0
Career			1	0	1	3	2	5	1	1	0.0	1.0	3.0	2.0	5.0	1.0	1.0

=== WAFL Statistics ===
Correct to the end of the 2023 season

Legend
G	Goals	K	Kicks	D	Disposals	T	Tackles
B	Behinds	H	Handballs	M	Marks

Season	Team	No.	Games	Totals							Averages (per game)						
Season	Team	No.	Games	G	B	K	H	D	M	T	G	B	K	H	D	M	T
2018	East Perth	51	8	5	5	89	77	166	34	30	0.6	0.6	11.1	9.6	20.7	4.2	3.7
2019	West Coast	10	16	3	10	230	132	362	65	104	0.1	0.6	14.3	8.2	22.6	4.0	6.5
2021	West Coast	45	18	8	6	238	170	408	92	65	0.4	0.3	13.2	9.4	22.6	5.1	3.6
2022	East Perth	22	18	6	10	295	205	500	92	82	0.3	0.5	16.3	11.3	27.7	5.1	4.5
2023	East Perth	22	19	25	14	293	206	499	129	56	1.3	0.7	15.4	10.8	26.3	6.8	2.9
Career			79	47	45	1145	790	1935	412	337	0.6	0.6	14.5	10.0	24.5	5.2	4.3
