= List of AFL debuts in 2025 =

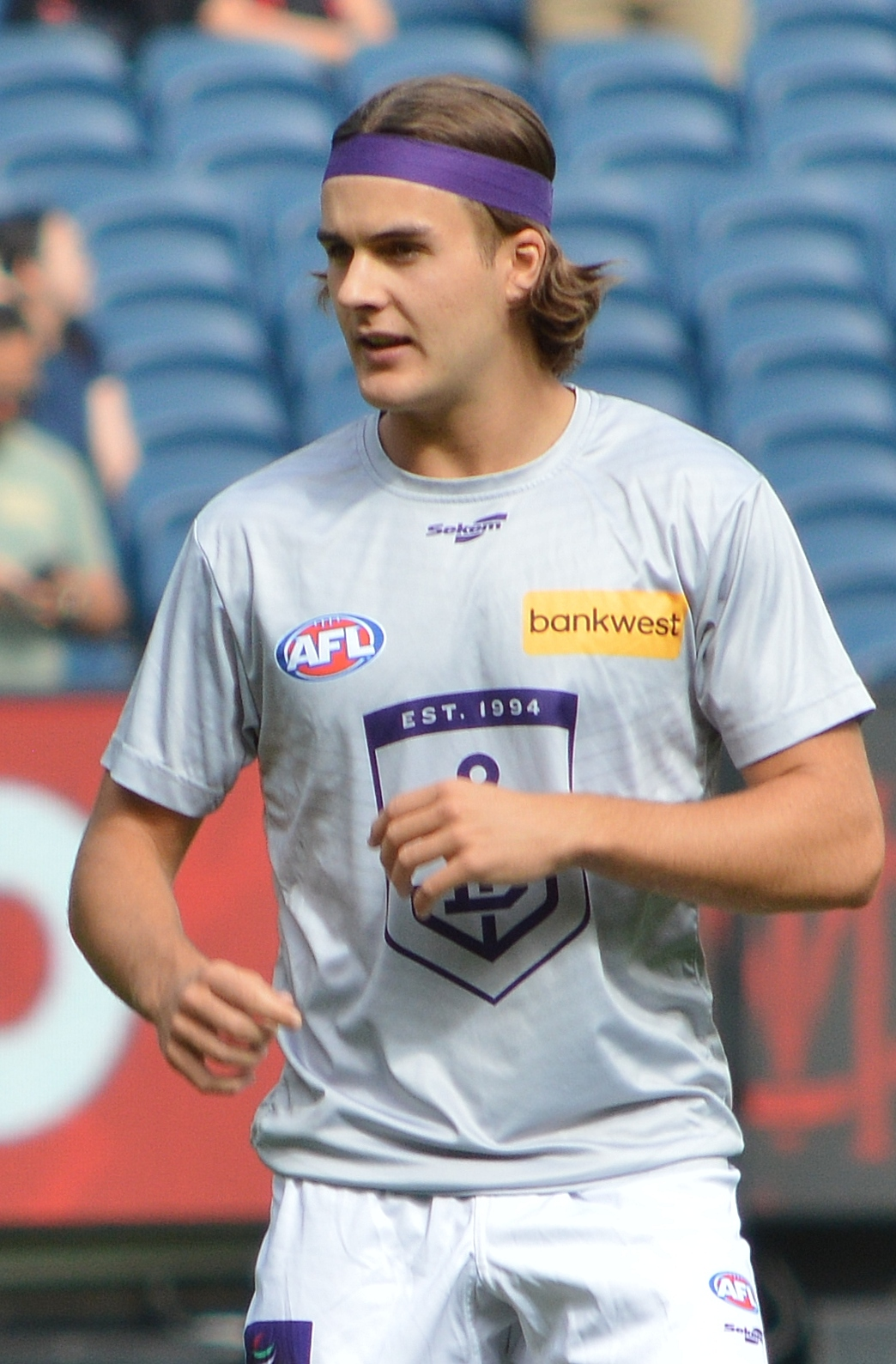
Fremantle's Murphy Reid made his debut in round one

This is a list of players in the Australian Football League (AFL) who have either made their AFL debut or played for a new club during the 2025 AFL season. Games and goals statistics are correct to the end of 2025.

In round 21, with the debut of Jayden Nguyen, Essendon set a new record for the highest number of debutants in a season (excluding expansion clubs). Their 14th debutant bested a record previously held by Fitzroy with 13 in 1991. Hawthorn became the first team in VFL/AFL history not to have a single AFL debutant in an entire season.

== Summary ==
Summary of debuts in 2025
Club	AFL debuts	Change of club
Adelaide	1	3
Brisbane Lions	5	2
Carlton	7	2
Collingwood	3	3
Essendon	15	1
Fremantle	2	2
Geelong	2	2
Gold Coast	4	2
Greater Western Sydney	4	1
Hawthorn	0	2
Melbourne	6	3
North Melbourne	7	3
Port Adelaide	8	3
Richmond	9	0
St Kilda	9	2
Sydney	3	2
West Coast	10	3
Western Bulldogs	5	1
Total	100	37

== AFL debuts ==
Name	Club	Age at debut	Debut round	Games (in 2025)	Goals (in 2025)	Notes
Tom Hanily	Sydney	19 years, 280 days	Opening	8	6	Pick 14, 2024 mid-season rookie draft
James Leake	Greater Western Sydney	19 years, 158 days	Opening	3	1	Pick 17, 2023 national draft
Lucas Camporeale	Carlton	18 years, 236 days	1	3	0	Pick 54, 2024 national draft
Harry Armstrong	Richmond	18 years, 272 days	1	8	6	Pick 23, 2024 national draft
Sam Lalor	Richmond	18 years, 196 days	1	11	11	Pick 1, 2024 national draft
Luke Trainor	Richmond	18 years, 338 days	1	21	1	Pick 21, 2024 national draft
Isaac Kako	Essendon	19 years, 8 days	1	23	15	Pick 13, 2024 national draft
Murphy Reid	Fremantle	18 years, 228 days	1	24	25	Pick 17, 2024 national draft
Levi Ashcroft	Brisbane Lions	18 years, 87 days	1	27	12	Pick 5, 2024 national draft
Riley Bice	Sydney	24 years, 170 days	1	16	1	Pick 41, 2024 national draft
Joe Berry	Port Adelaide	18 years, 331 days	1	12	3	Pick 15, 2024 national draft
Sam Davidson	Western Bulldogs	23 years, 92 days	1	19	13	Pick 51, 2024 national draft
Josh Dolan	Western Bulldogs	18 years, 124 days	1	11	1	Pick 31, 2024 national draft
Jacob Konstanty	North Melbourne	20 years, 126 days	1	23	11	Traded in 2024, previously listed with Sydney
Finn O'Sullivan	North Melbourne	18 years, 288 days	1	22	1	Pick 2, 2024 national draft
Sid Draper	Adelaide	18 years, 254 days	1	10	3	Pick 4, 2024 national draft
Harry Boyd	St Kilda	27 years, 33 days	1	1	0	2025 pre-season supplemental selection
Max Hall	St Kilda	22 years, 335 days	1	23	23	Pick 4, 2024 mid-season rookie draft
Liam O'Connell	St Kilda	22 years, 12 days	1	7	0	2023 category B rookie selection
Jack Henderson	Melbourne	25 years, 166 days	1	5	2	2025 pre-season supplemental selection
Matthew Jefferson	Melbourne	21 years, 8 days	1	7	4	Pick 15, 2022 national draft
Aidan Johnson	Melbourne	25 years, 7 days	1	5	3	Pick 68, 2024 national draft
Harvey Langford	Melbourne	19 years, 1 day	1	22	14	Pick 6, 2024 national draft
Xavier Lindsay	Melbourne	18 years, 225 days	1	18	2	Pick 11, 2024 national draft
Archer Reid	West Coast	19 years, 178 days	1	14	5	Pick 30, 2023 national draft
Tom Edwards	Essendon	24 years, 305 days	2	2	3	2025 pre-season supplemental selection
Liam Fawcett	Richmond	19 years, 334 days	2	1	1	Pick 43, 2023 national draft
Christian Moraes	Port Adelaide	18 years, 134 days	2	14	2	Pick 38, 2024 national draft
Isaac Keeler	St Kilda	20 years, 333 days	2	11	10	Pick 44, 2022 national draft
Will McLachlan	Brisbane Lions	19 years, 344 days	2	6	3	Pick 6, 2024 mid-season rookie draft
Tom Cochrane	Port Adelaide	19 years, 59 days	3	3	2	Pick 13, 2025 rookie draft
Saad El-Hawli	Essendon	23 years, 316 days	3	9	1	Pick 13, 2024 mid-season rookie draft
Tobie Travaglia	St Kilda	18 years, 154 days	3	12	2	Pick 8, 2024 national draft
Isaiah Dudley	Fremantle	21 years, 334 days	3	16	15	2025 pre-season supplemental selection
Will White	Carlton	21 years, 16 days	4	14	10	2025 pre-season supplemental selection
Matt Whitlock	North Melbourne	18 years, 324 days	4	2	1	Pick 27, 2024 national draft
Sandy Brock	West Coast	22 years, 113 days	4	14	0	Pick 36, 2021 rookie draft
Hamish Davis	West Coast	18 years, 339 days	4	8	1	Pick 65, 2024 national draft
Tom Gross	West Coast	18 years, 203 days	4	8	1	Pick 46, 2024 national draft
Matt Carroll	Carlton	19 years, 135 days	5	15	1	Pick 15, 2024 rookie draft
Cooper Hynes	Western Bulldogs	19 years, 43 days	5	8	4	Pick 20, 2024 national draft
Jonty Faull	Richmond	19 years, 71 days	5	16	9	Pick 14, 2024 national draft
Sam Marshall	Brisbane Lions	19 years, 88 days	6	11	1	Pick 25, 2024 national draft
Campbell Gray	Richmond	21 years, 266 days	7	3	0	Pick 16, 2024 mid-season rookie draft
Jedd Busslinger	Western Bulldogs	21 years, 46 days	7	7	0	Pick 13, 2022 national draft
Oliver Wiltshire	Geelong	22 years, 224 days	7	2	1	Pick 61, 2023 national draft
Finnbar Maley	North Melbourne	21 years, 287 days	8	7	4	Pick 2, 2024 rookie draft
Hugh Boxshall	St Kilda	18 years, 295 days	8	11	2	Pick 45, 2024 national draft
Bo Allan	West Coast	19 years, 76 days	8	6	0	Pick 16, 2024 national draft
Josaia Delana	Greater Western Sydney	18 years, 307 days	8	3	0	2024 category B rookie selection
Archer Day-Wicks	Essendon	18 years, 362 days	9	5	1	Pick 6, 2025 rookie draft
Lewis Hayes	Essendon	20 years, 144 days	9	1	0	Pick 25, 2022 national draft
Tom Sims	Richmond	18 years, 364 days	9	11	4	Pick 28, 2024 national draft
Cody Angove	Greater Western Sydney	18 years, 348 days	9	4	1	Pick 24, 2024 national draft
Angus Clarke	Essendon	18 years, 202 days	11	14	5	Pick 39, 2024 national draft
Harry O'Farrell	Carlton	19 years, 21 days	11	6	1	Pick 40, 2024 national draft
Will Hayes	Collingwood	19 years, 8 days	11	2	1	Pick 56, 2024 national draft
Hugh Jackson	Port Adelaide	22 years, 21 days	11	9	1	Pick 55, 2021 national draft
Zak Johnson	Essendon	18 years, 156 days	12	9	0	Pick 70, 2024 national draft
Leo Lombard	Gold Coast	18 years, 238 days	12	4	1	Pick 9, 2024 national draft
Ty Gallop	Brisbane Lions	19 years, 117 days	13	6	4	Pick 42, 2024 national draft
Nick Madden	Greater Western Sydney	21 years, 22 days	13	3	0	2022 category B rookie selection
Luamon Lual	Essendon	20 years, 72 days	13	12	4	Pick 39, 2023 national draft
Hudson O'Keeffe	Carlton	20 years, 174 days	13	5	3	2023 pre-season supplemental selection
Lachlan Blakiston	Essendon	26 years, 278 days	14	11	1	Pick 13, 2025 mid-season rookie draft
Archie May	Essendon	20 years, 291 days	14	7	7	Pick 6, 2025 mid-season rookie draft
Mani Liddy	Port Adelaide	23 years, 115 days	14	9	1	Pick 16, 2025 mid-season rookie draft
Tom McCarthy	West Coast	24 years, 338 days	14	10	0	Pick 1, 2025 mid-season rookie draft
Vigo Visentini	Essendon	19 years, 287 days	15	2	0	Pick 8, 2023 rookie draft
Alix Tauru	St Kilda	18 years, 217 days	15	10	1	Pick 10, 2024 national draft
Jasper Alger	Richmond	18 years, 197 days	15	4	2	Pick 58, 2024 national draft
Billy Wilson	Carlton	20 years, 10 days	16	4	0	Pick 34, 2023 national draft
Flynn Young	Carlton	23 years, 143 days	16	8	5	Pick 4, 2025 mid-season rookie draft
Jobe Shanahan	West Coast	19 years, 330 days	16	9	12	Pick 30, 2024 national draft
Charlie West	Collingwood	19 years, 147 days	16	1	1	Pick 50, 2024 national draft
Roan Steele	Collingwood	23 years, 253 days	17	5	0	Pick 8, 2025 mid-season rookie draft
Malakai Champion	West Coast	19 years, 48 days	17	2	0	2024 category B rookie selection
Oscar Adams	Gold Coast	21 years, 347 days	17	8	0	Pick 7, 2025 mid-season rookie draft
George Stevens	Geelong	20 years, 82 days	17	2	1	Pick 58, 2023 national draft
Oskar Smartt	Essendon	19 years, 259 days	18	4	0	Pick 17, 2025 mid-season rookie draft
Taj Hotton	Richmond	19 years, 25 days	18	7	3	Pick 12, 2024 national draft
Max Heath	St Kilda	22 years, 262 days	18	4	3	Pick 7, 2021 mid-season rookie draft
Liam McMahon	Essendon	23 years, 76 days	19	7	12	Pick 18, 2025 mid-season rookie draft, previously listed with Collingwood
Zac Banch	North Melbourne	21 years, 363 days	19	4	1	Pick 2, 2025 mid-season rookie draft
Ben Jepson	Gold Coast	23 years, 283 days	19	1	0	2025 pre-season supplemental selection
Jesse Dattoli	Sydney	18 years, 360 days	21	3	0	Pick 22, 2024 national draft
Jayden Nguyen	Essendon	19 years, 6 days	21	5	0	2024 category B rookie selection
Jack Whitlock	Port Adelaide	19 years, 79 days	21	4	4	Pick 33, 2024 national draft
Geordie Payne	North Melbourne	19 years, 277 days	22	3	3	Pick 1, 2024 mid-season rookie draft
Cooper Trembath	North Melbourne	19 years, 297 days	22	3	9	Pick 10, 2025 mid-season rookie draft
Jed Adams	Melbourne	21 years, 88 days	22	1	0	Pick 38, 2022 national draft
Alex Dodson	St Kilda	19 years, 61 days	23	1	0	Pick 53, 2024 national draft
Rhys Unwin	Essendon	18 years, 308 days	23	3	1	Pick 61, 2024 national draft
Luke Beecken	Brisbane Lions	24 years, 109 days	23	1	0	Pick 17, 2024 mid-season rookie draft
Jordan Croft	Western Bulldogs	20 years, 67 days	23	2	4	Pick 15, 2023 national draft
Jacob Newton	West Coast	19 years, 150 days	23	2	1	Pick 9, 2025 mid-season rookie draft
Lachie Gulbin	Gold Coast	18 years, 271 days	24	1	0	2024 category B rookie selection
Ewan Mackinlay	Port Adelaide	22 years, 35 days	24	1	1	Pick 11, 2025 mid-season rookie draft
Harrison Ramm	Port Adelaide	18 years, 260 days	24	1	0	Pick 3, 2025 mid-season rookie draft
Lucca Grego	West Coast	18 years, 251 days	24	1	0	Pick 48, 2024 national draft

== Change of AFL club ==
Name	Club	Age at debut	Debut round	Games (in 2025)	Goals (in 2025)	Former clubs	Recruiting method
Tom Barrass	Hawthorn	29 years, 150 days	Opening	25	0	West Coast	Traded in 2024
Josh Battle	Hawthorn	26 years, 187 days	Opening	26	0	St Kilda	Free agent in 2024
Ben Paton	Sydney	26 years, 139 days	Opening	4	0	St Kilda	Pick 25, 2025 rookie draft
Tim Membrey	Collingwood	30 years, 287 days	Opening	23	32	St Kilda & Sydney	Delisted free agent in 2024
Harry Perryman	Collingwood	26 years, 80 days	Opening	25	4	Greater Western Sydney	Free agent in 2024
Nick Haynes	Carlton	32 years, 300 days	1	23	0	Greater Western Sydney	Free agent in 2024
Francis Evans	Carlton	23 years, 202 days	1	10	13	Port Adelaide & Geelong	2025 pre-season supplemental selection
Jaxon Prior	Essendon	23 years, 284 days	1	23	0	Brisbane Lions	2025 pre-season supplemental selection
Bailey Smith	Geelong	24 years, 98 days	1	23	8	Western Bulldogs	Traded in 2024
Joel Hamling	Sydney	31 years, 340 days	1	14	3	Fremantle & Western Bulldogs	Free agent in 2023
Caleb Daniel	North Melbourne	28 years, 251 days	1	23	0	Western Bulldogs	Traded in 2024
Jack Darling	North Melbourne	32 years, 275 days	1	22	24	West Coast	Traded in 2024
Luke Parker	North Melbourne	32 years, 141 days	1	22	12	Sydney	Traded in 2024
Matthew Kennedy	Western Bulldogs	27 years, 343 days	1	23	21	Carlton & Greater Western Sydney	Traded in 2024
Dan Houston	Collingwood	27 years, 307 days	1	21	7	Port Adelaide	Traded in 2024
Jack Lukosius	Port Adelaide	24 years, 218 days	1	7	8	Gold Coast	Traded in 2024
Joe Richards	Port Adelaide	25 years, 112 days	1	22	15	Collingwood	Traded in 2024
Isaac Cumming	Adelaide	26 years, 217 days	1	24	7	Greater Western Sydney	Free agent in 2024
Jack Macrae	St Kilda	30 years, 225 days	1	21	1	Western Bulldogs	Traded in 2024
Alex Neal-Bullen	Adelaide	29 years, 66 days	1	25	17	Melbourne	Traded in 2024
James Peatling	Adelaide	24 years, 207 days	1	23	12	Greater Western Sydney	Traded in 2024
Harry Sharp	Melbourne	22 years, 89 days	1	18	8	Brisbane Lions	Traded in 2024
Liam Baker	West Coast	27 years, 48 days	1	23	5	Richmond	Traded in 2024
Jack Graham	West Coast	27 years, 19 days	1	18	2	Richmond	Free agent in 2024
Matthew Owies	West Coast	27 years, 362 days	1	16	7	Carlton	Traded in 2024
John Noble	Gold Coast	27 years, 356 days	1	25	3	Collingwood	Traded in 2024
Daniel Rioli	Gold Coast	27 years, 334 days	1	20	8	Richmond	Traded in 2024
Sam Day	Brisbane Lions	32 years, 198 days	2	13	3	Gold Coast	Pick 2, 2024 pre-season draft
Shai Bolton	Fremantle	26 years, 105 days	2	23	28	Richmond	Traded in 2024
Jake Stringer	Greater Western Sydney	30 years, 338 days	3	15	25	Essendon & Western Bulldogs	Traded in 2024
Tom Fullarton	Melbourne	26 years, 55 days	6	2	0	Brisbane Lions	Traded in 2023
Rory Atkins	Port Adelaide	30 years, 282 days	6	3	0	Gold Coast & Adelaide	Traded in 2024
Quinton Narkle	Fremantle	27 years, 143 days	7	2	1	Port Adelaide & Geelong	2025 pre-season supplemental selection
Jack Carroll	St Kilda	22 years, 163 days	12	3	0	Carlton	Delisted free agent in 2024
Jack Martin	Geelong	22 years, 163 days	13	13	12	Carlton & Gold Coast	Delisted free agent in 2024
Jai Culley	Melbourne	22 years, 159 days	21	4	3	West Coast	2025 pre-season supplemental selection
Tom Doedee	Brisbane Lions	28 years, 161 days	22	3	0	Adelaide	Free agent in 2023

== See also ==
- List of AFL Women's debuts in 2025
