= 2024 AFL draft =

Draft for the Australian Football League

General information
- Dates: 29 May 2024 – Mid-season Draft; 20–21 November 2024 – National Draft; 22 November 2024 – Rookie Draft
- Location: Marvel Stadium
- Network: Fox Footy
- Sponsored by: National Australia Bank

Overview
- League: AFL
- First selection: Sam Lalor (Richmond)

The 2024 AFL draft consisted of the various periods where the 18 clubs in the Australian Football League (AFL) can trade and recruit players during and following the completion of the 2024 AFL season.

== Key dates ==
Table of key dates
Event	Date(s)
Mid-season rookie draft	29 May 2024
Free agency period	Restricted and Unrestricted: 4–11 October 2024; Delisted: October–November 2024
Trade period	7–16 October 2024
National draft	20–21 November 2024
Pre-Season and Rookie draft	22 November 2024
Pre-season supplemental selection period	December 2024 – March 2025

== 2024 mid-season rookie draft ==
The mid-season draft was held after the conclusion of Round 11 of the 2024 AFL season on 29 May. The draft was only open to clubs with inactive players on their list and vacancies available, such as long-term injuries or retirements.

Mid-season draft selections
Rd	Pick	Player	Club	Recruited from		Pick due to
Rd	Pick	Player	Club	Club	League	Pick due to
1	1	Geordie Payne	North Melbourne	Tasmania Devils	Talent League	Callum Coleman-Jones long-term injury
1	2	Jacob Blight	Richmond	Peel Thunder	WAFL	Judson Clarke long-term injury
1	3	Jack Hutchinson	West Coast	Collingwood	VFL	Noah Long long-term injury
1	4	Max Hall	St Kilda	Box Hill Hawks	VFL	James Van Es long-term injury
1	5	Jasper Scaife	Hawthorn	West Perth	WAFL	Sam Butler long-term injury
1	6	Will McLachlan	Brisbane Lions	Geelong Falcons	Talent League	Keidean Coleman long-term injury
1	7	Toby Murray	Adelaide	Adelaide	SANFL	Rory Sloane retirement
1	8	Kelsey Rypstra	Western Bulldogs	North Adelaide	SANFL	Aiden O'Driscoll retirement
1	9	Cooper Lord	Carlton	North Melbourne	VFL	Jack Silvagni long-term injury
1	10	Iliro Smit	Collingwood	Eastern Ranges	Talent League	Nathan Murphy retirement
1	11	Luker Kentfield	Melbourne	Subiaco	WAFL	Angus Brayshaw retirement
1	12	Logan Evans	Port Adelaide	Port Adelaide	SANFL	Sam Powell-Pepper long-term injury
1	13	Saad El-Hawli	Essendon	Northern Bullants	VFL	Jaiden Hunter long-term injury
1	14	Tom Hanily	Sydney	Gippsland Power	Talent League	Jack Buller long-term injury
2	15	Brynn Teakle	North Melbourne	East Fremantle	WAFL	Josh Goater long-term injury
2	16	Campbell Gray	Richmond	Essendon	VFL	Josh Gibcus long-term injury
2	17	Luke Beecken	Brisbane Lions	Woodville-West Torrens	SANFL	Tom Doedee long-term injury
2	18	Passed	Adelaide	—	—	Wayne Milera long-term injury
2	19	Ned Long	Collingwood	Collingwood	VFL	Aiden Begg long-term injury
3	20	Passed	Richmond	—	—	Sam Naismith long-term injury
3	21	Darcy Craven	Brisbane Lions	East Perth	WAFL	Darcy Gardiner long-term injury
3	22	Passed	Adelaide	—	—	Patrick Parnell long-term injury
4	23	Passed	Brisbane Lions	—	—	Lincoln McCarthy long-term injury

== Player movements ==
=== Previous trades ===
Table of previously traded selections
Rd	Orig. Club	New Club	Acquired via	Ref
1	Port Adelaide	Fremantle	pick swap	
1	Western Bulldogs	Gold Coast	pick swap	
1	North Melbourne (priority pick #19)	Sydney	Dylan Stephens trade	
1	North Melbourne (priority pick #20)	Gold Coast	pick swap	
1	Collingwood	Fremantle	Lachie Schultz trade	
2	Fremantle	Richmond	via Port Adelaide (pick swap) on-traded to Richmond (Ivan Soldo trade)	
2	Sydney	Melbourne	Brodie Grundy trade	
2	St Kilda	Fremantle	Liam Henry trade	
2	Melbourne	Adelaide	Shane McAdam trade	
2	Collingwood	Hawthorn	Jack Ginnivan trade	
2	Hawthorn	Collingwood	Jack Ginnivan trade	
2	Brisbane Lions	Gold Coast	via Hawthorn (Jack Gunston & Brandon Ryan trade) on-traded to Gold Coast (Mabior Chol trade)	
2	Adelaide	St Kilda	via Greater Western Sydney (pick swap at the 2023 draft) on-traded to St Kilda (pick swap at the 2023 draft)	
3	Gold Coast	Western Bulldogs	pick swap	
3	Western Bulldogs	Melbourne	James Harmes trade	
3	Carlton	Greater Western Sydney	via St Kilda (Paddy Dow and Nick Coffield trade) on-traded to Greater Western Sydney (pick swap at the 2023 draft)	
3	Essendon	Gold Coast	via Carlton (Paddy Dow and Nick Coffield trade) on-traded to Gold Coast (Elijah Hollands trade)	
3	Hawthorn	Collingwood	Jack Ginnivan trade	
3	Melbourne	St Kilda	Jack Billings trade	
3	St Kilda	Melbourne	pick swap at the 2023 draft	
3	Fremantle	Richmond	pick swap at the 2023 draft	
3	West Coast	Richmond	pick swap at the 2023 draft	
4	St Kilda	Fremantle	Liam Henry trade	
4	Fremantle	Carlton	via St Kilda (Liam Henry trade) on-traded to Carlton (Paddy Dow and Nick Coffield trade)	
4	Western Bulldogs	Carlton	Paddy Dow and Nick Coffield trade	
4	Carlton	Hawthorn	via Essendon (Paddy Dow and Nick Coffield trade) on-traded to Port Adelaide (Xavier Duursma and Brandon Zerk-Thatcher trade) on-traded to Hawthorn (pick swap at the 2023 draft)	
4	Port Adelaide	Richmond	Ivan Soldo trade	
4	Collingwood	Richmond	via Hawthorn (Jack Ginnivan trade) on-traded to Essendon (Massimo D'Ambrosio trade) on-traded to Richmond (pick swap at the 2023 draft)	
4	Gold Coast	Carlton	Elijah Hollands trade	
4	Hawthorn	Brisbane Lions	Jack Gunston & Brandon Ryan trade	
4	Essendon	North Melbourne	via Port Adelaide (Xavier Duursma and Brandon Zerk-Thatcher trade) on-traded to North Melbourne (pick swap at the 2023 draft)	
4	Brisbane Lions	Gold Coast	pick swap at the 2023 draft	
4	Sydney	Hawthorn	pick swap at the 2023 draft	

=== Free agency ===
2024 AFL free agency period signings
Player	Free agent type	Recruited from	New club	Compensation	Notes	Ref
Josh Battle	Unrestricted	St Kilda	Hawthorn	First Round		
Isaac Cumming	Unrestricted	Greater Western Sydney	Adelaide	End of First Round		
Tom Campbell	Delisted	St Kilda	Melbourne	—N/a		
Harry Perryman	Unrestricted	Greater Western Sydney	Collingwood	First Round		
Elliott Himmelberg	Unrestricted	Adelaide	Gold Coast	None		
Nick Haynes	Unrestricted	Greater Western Sydney	Carlton	None		
Jack Graham	Unrestricted	Richmond	West Coast	End of Second Round		
Tim Membrey	Delisted	St Kilda	Collingwood	—N/a		
Jack Martin	Delisted	Carlton	Geelong	—N/a		
Jack Carroll	Delisted	Carlton	St Kilda	—N/a		

=== Trades ===
Table of trades
Clubs involved	Trade		Ref
Adelaide Melbourne	to Adelaide (from Melbourne): Alex Neal-Bullen	to Melbourne (from Adelaide): pick No. 28	
North Melbourne West Coast	to North Melbourne (from West Coast): Jack Darling	to West Coast (from North Melbourne): pick No. 67	
Richmond Brisbane Lions	to Richmond (from Brisbane Lions): pick No. 20	to Brisbane Lions (from Richmond): pick No. 32; pick No. 42; pick No. 43; pick No. 45	
Carlton Brisbane Lions	to Carlton (from Brisbane Lions): pick No. 73; 2025 second round pick (Brisbane Lions)	to Brisbane Lions (from Carlton): pick No. 34; pick No. 66	
Hawthorn Carlton	to Hawthorn (from Carlton): 2025 first round pick (Carlton); 2025 second round pick (Carlton)	to Carlton (from Hawthorn): pick No. 14	
Melbourne Adelaide	to Melbourne (from Adelaide): pick No. 46	to Adelaide (from Melbourne): 2025 third round pick (Melbourne)	
Melbourne Essendon	to Melbourne (from Essendon): pick No. 9; 2025 third round pick (Essendon)	to Essendon (from Melbourne): pick No. 28; pick No. 40; pick No. 46; pick No. 54; pick No. 65; 2025 first round pick (Melbourne)	
Carlton Richmond West Coast	to Carlton: pick No. 3 (from West Coast); pick No. 63 (from West Coast); pick No. 68 (from West Coast); to Richmond: pick No. 14 (from Carlton)	to West Coast: Liam Baker (from Richmond); Matthew Owies (from Carlton); pick No. 12 (from Carlton); pick No. 73 (from Carlton)	
Brisbane Lions St Kilda	to Brisbane Lions (from St Kilda): pick No. 27	to St Kilda (from Brisbane Lions): pick No. 32; pick No. 45	
Port Adelaide Collingwood Gold Coast	to Port Adelaide: Jack Lukosius (from Gold Coast); Joe Richards (from Collingwood); Rory Atkins (from Gold Coast); pick No. 13 (from Gold Coast); pick No. 29 (from Gold Coast); pick No. 36 (from Collingwood); pick No. 50 (from Gold Coast)	to Collingwood: Dan Houston (from Port Adelaide); pick No. 58 (from Port Adelaide); to Gold Coast: John Noble (from Collingwood); pick No. 39 (from Port Adelaide); 2025 first round pick (Port Adelaide); 2025 first round pick (Collingwood)	
Melbourne Brisbane Lions	to Melbourne (from Brisbane Lions): Harry Sharp; 2025 third round pick (Brisbane Lions)	to Brisbane Lions (from Melbourne): pick No. 49; 2025 third round pick (Essendon)	
Fremantle Richmond	to Fremantle (from Richmond): Shai Bolton; pick No. 14; 2025 third round pick (Richmond)	to Richmond (from Fremantle): pick No. 10; pick No. 11; pick No. 18	
Gold Coast Richmond	to Gold Coast (from Richmond): Daniel Rioli; pick No. 51; pick No. 61; pick No. 70; pick No. 76	to Richmond (from Gold Coast): pick No. 6; pick No. 23	
Adelaide Greater Western Sydney	to Adelaide (from Greater Western Sydney): James Peatling; 2025 third round pick (Greater Western Sydney); 2025 fourth round pick (Greater Western Sydney)	to Greater Western Sydney (from Adelaide): 2025 second round pick (Adelaide)	
North Melbourne Western Bulldogs	to North Melbourne (from Western Bulldogs): Caleb Daniel	to Western Bulldogs (from North Melbourne): pick No. 25	
North Melbourne Sydney	to North Melbourne (from Sydney): Luke Parker; Jacob Konstanty	to Sydney (from North Melbourne): pick No. 44	
Hawthorn West Coast	to Hawthorn (from West Coast): Tom Barrass; 2025 fourth round pick (West Coast)	to West Coast (from Hawthorn): 2025 first round pick (Hawthorn); 2025 second round pick (Hawthorn); 2025 third round pick (Hawthorn)	
Geelong Western Bulldogs St Kilda Carlton	to Geelong: Bailey Smith (from Western Bulldogs); pick No. 45 (from St Kilda); to Western Bulldogs: Matthew Kennedy (from Carlton); pick No. 17 (from Geelong)	to St Kilda: Jack Macrae (from Western Bulldogs); to Carlton: pick No. 38 (from Geelong)	
Greater Western Sydney Essendon	to Greater Western Sydney (from Essendon): Jake Stringer	to Essendon (from Greater Western Sydney): pick No. 53	
Brisbane Lions Collingwood	to Brisbane Lions (from Collingwood): pick No. 58	to Collingwood (from Brisbane Lions): pick No. 60; pick No. 66	
Picks swapped at the 2024 National Draft
Greater Western Sydney Brisbane Lions	to Greater Western Sydney (from Brisbane Lions): pick No. 34	to Brisbane Lions (from Greater Western Sydney): pick No. 37; pick No. 56; pick No. 73	
Western Bulldogs Brisbane Lions	to Western Bulldogs (from Brisbane Lions): pick No. 27	to Brisbane Lions (from Western Bulldogs): pick No. 35; pick No. 48	
Brisbane Lions Essendon	to Brisbane Lions (from Essendon): pick No. 40; pick No. 46; pick No. 53	to Essendon (from Brisbane Lions): pick No. 35; pick No. 37; pick No. 58	
Essendon St Kilda	to Essendon (from St Kilda): pick No. 32; pick No. 47	to St Kilda (from Essendon): pick No. 28; pick No. 58	
Port Adelaide West Coast	to Port Adelaide (from West Coast): pick No. 15	to West Coast (from Port Adelaide): pick No. 16; pick No. 45	
North Melbourne Richmond	to North Melbourne (from Richmond): pick No. 27; 2025 second round pick (Richmond)	to Richmond (from North Melbourne): 2025 first round pick (North Melbourne)	
West Coast Brisbane Lions	to West Coast (from Brisbane Lions): pick No. 46	to Brisbane Lions (from West Coast): 2025 third round pick (West Coast)	
Gold Coast Brisbane Lions	to Gold Coast (from Brisbane Lions): pick No. 47	to Brisbane Lions (from Gold Coast): 2025 third round pick (Gold Coast)	
Western Bulldogs Brisbane Lions	to Western Bulldogs (from Brisbane Lions): pick No. 49	to Brisbane Lions (from Western Bulldogs): 2025 third round pick (Western Bulldogs)	
St Kilda Essendon	to St Kilda (from Essendon): pick No. 45; 2025 fourth round pick (Essendon)	to Essendon (from St Kilda): 2025 second round pick (St Kilda)	
Richmond Gold Coast	to Richmond (from Gold Coast): pick No. 58	to Gold Coast (from Richmond): 2025 fourth round pick (Richmond)	
St Kilda Brisbane Lions	to St Kilda (from Brisbane Lions): pick No. 60	to Brisbane Lions (from St Kilda): 2025 fourth round pick (St Kilda)	

== List changes ==
=== Retirements ===
Table key
R	Rookie listed player
B	Category B Rookie listed player

Table of player retirements
Name	Club	Ref
Angus Brayshaw	Melbourne	
Nathan Murphy	Collingwood	
Rory Sloane	Adelaide	
Aiden O'Driscoll	Western Bulldogs	
Josh Carmichael R	Collingwood	
Sam Reid	Sydney	
Brandon Ellis	Gold Coast	
Dustin Martin	Richmond	
Tom Hawkins	Geelong	
Andrew Gaff	West Coast	
Dyson Heppell	Essendon	
Ben Brown	Melbourne	
Liam Shiels	North Melbourne	
Zach Tuohy	Geelong	
Dylan Grimes	Richmond	
Sam Naismith	Richmond	
Marlion Pickett	Richmond	
Hugh Greenwood	North Melbourne	
Chad Wingard	Hawthorn	
Jake Kelly	Essendon	
Jarryd Lyons	Brisbane Lions	
Josh Corbett	Fremantle	
Trent McKenzie	Port Adelaide	
Charlie Dixon	Port Adelaide	
Lachie Hunter	Melbourne	
Adam Kennedy	Greater Western Sydney	
Joe Daniher	Brisbane Lions	
Levi Casboult	Gold Coast	
Alex Keath	Western Bulldogs	
Jaidyn Stephenson	North Melbourne	
Luke Edwards	West Coast	

=== Delistings ===
Table of player delistings
Name	Club	Ref
Tarryn Thomas	North Melbourne	
Jaiden Hunter R	Essendon	
Aiden Begg R	Collingwood	
Nick Hind	Essendon	
Tex Wanganeen R	Essendon	
Kaine Baldwin	Essendon	
Josh Schache	Melbourne	
Kyah Farris-White B	Melbourne	
Matthew Allison	St Kilda	
Riley Bonner	St Kilda	
Tom Campbell	St Kilda	
James Van Es	St Kilda	
Sebastian Ross	St Kilda	
Darcy Macpherson	Gold Coast	
James Tsitas	Gold Coast	
Jack Mahony	Gold Coast	
Sandy Brock	Gold Coast	
Oskar Faulkhead	Gold Coast	
Will Rowlands	Gold Coast	
Sam Day	Gold Coast	
Matt Taberner	Fremantle	
Ethan Hughes	Fremantle	
Sebit Kuek	Fremantle	
Conrad Williams	Fremantle	
Jack Martin	Carlton	
David Cuningham	Carlton	
Caleb Marchbank	Carlton	
Alex Mirkov	Carlton	
Domanic Akuei	Carlton	
Curtis Taylor	North Melbourne	
Bigoa Nyuon	North Melbourne	
Tyler Sellers	North Melbourne	
Hamish Free	North Melbourne	
Gary Rohan	Geelong	
Brandan Parfitt	Geelong	
Emerson Jeka	Geelong	
Phoenix Foster	Geelong	
Oscar Murdoch	Geelong	
James Willis	Geelong	
Mitch Hardie	Geelong	
Cooper Hamilton	Greater Western Sydney	
Braydon Preuss	Greater Western Sydney	
Cooper Stephens	Hawthorn	
Clay Tucker	Hawthorn	
Jamaine Jones	West Coast	
Zane Trew	West Coast	
Jordyn Baker	West Coast	
Dominc Bedendo	Western Bulldogs	
Kelsey Rypstra	Western Bulldogs	
Tom McCallum	Port Adelaide	
Ethan Stanley	Fremantle	
Ned McHenry	Adelaide	
Will Hamill	Adelaide	
Lachlan Gollant	Adelaide	
Patrick Parnell	Adelaide	
James Madden	Brisbane Lions	
Carter Michael	Brisbane Lions	
Kalin Lane	Brisbane Lions	
Cooper Vickery	Sydney	
Harry Arnold	Sydney	
Jaiden Magor	Sydney	
Hewago Oea	Gold Coast	
Adam Tomlinson	Melbourne	
Lachlan McAndrew	Sydney	
Nathan Kreuger	Collingwood	
Jack Bytel	Collingwood	
Josh Eyre	Collingwood	
Sam Weideman	Essendon	
Alex Witherden	West Coast	
Jai Culley	West Coast	
Coby Burgiel	West Coast	
Denver Grainger-Barras	Hawthorn	
Ethan Phillips	Hawthorn	
Jack O'Sullivan	Hawthorn	
Charlie Clarke	Western Bulldogs	
Quinton Narkle	Port Adelaide	
Tom Clurey	Port Adelaide	
Francis Evans	Port Adelaide	
Thomas Scully	Port Adelaide	
Kyle Marshall	Port Adelaide	
Josh Rotham	West Coast	
Joe Furphy	Geelong	
Jack Carroll	Carlton	
Matt Carroll	Carlton	
Sam Durdin	Carlton	
Jaxon Prior	Brisbane Lions	
Darcy Craven	Brisbane Lions	
Darragh Joyce	Brisbane Lions	
Noah Cumberland	Richmond	
Matthew Coulthard	Richmond	
Mate Colina	Richmond	
Jayden Davey	Essendon	
Blake Drury	North Melbourne	
Charlie Lazzaro	North Melbourne	
Tom Emmett	Fremantle	
Max Knobel	Fremantle	
Tim Membrey	St Kilda	
Jack Hayes	St Kilda	
Olli Hotton	St Kilda	
Ben Paton	St Kilda	
Joshua Bennetts	Hawthorn	
Ash Johnson	Collingwood	
Oleg Markov	Collingwood	
Joel Hamling	Sydney	
Aaron Francis	Sydney	
Toby Pink	North Melbourne	
Jack Gunston	Hawthorn	
Lachlan Keeffe	Greater Western Sydney	
Josh Fahey	Greater Western Sydney	
Jacob Wehr	Greater Western Sydney	
Brad Crouch	St Kilda	
Joel Smith	Melbourne	
Harry Schoenberg	Adelaide	
Chris Burgess	Adelaide	

== 2024 national draft ==
^	Denotes player who has been inducted to the Australian Football Hall of Fame
*	Denotes player who has been a premiership player and been selected for at least one All-Australian team
^{+}	Denotes player who has been a premiership player at least once
^{x}	Denotes player who has been selected for at least one All-Australian team
^{#}	Denotes player who has never played in a VFL/AFL home and away season or finals game
^{~}	Denotes player who has been selected as Rising Star

Table of national draft selections
Round	Pick	Player	Club	Recruited from		Notes
Round	Pick	Player	Club	Club	League	Notes
1	1	Sam Lalor	Richmond	Greater Western Victoria Rebels	Talent League	
1	2	Finn O'Sullivan	North Melbourne	Oakleigh Chargers	Talent League	
1	3	Jagga Smith	Carlton	Oakleigh Chargers	Talent League	←West Coast
1	4	Sid Draper	Adelaide	South Adelaide	SANFL	
1	5	Levi Ashcroft	Brisbane Lions	Sandringham Dragons	Talent League	Father–son selection (son of Marcus Ashcroft), matched bid by Melbourne
1	6	Harvey Langford	Melbourne	Dandenong Stingrays	Talent League	
1	7	Josh Smillie	Richmond	Eastern Ranges	Talent League	←Gold Coast
1	8	Tobie Travaglia	St Kilda	Bendigo Pioneers	Talent League	
1	9	Leo Lombard	Gold Coast	Broadbeach	QAFL	Academy selection, matched bid by St Kilda
1	10	Alix Tauru	St Kilda	Gippsland Power	Talent League	Free agency compensation pick (Battle)
1	11	Xavier Lindsay	Melbourne	Gippsland Power	Talent League	←Essendon
1	12	Taj Hotton	Richmond	Sandringham Dragons	Talent League	←Fremantle
1	13	Isaac Kako	Essendon	Calder Cannons	Talent League	Next Generation Academy selection (Iraqi descent), matched bid by Richmond
1	14	Jonty Faull	Richmond	Greater Western Victoria Rebels	Talent League	←Fremantle←Collingwood (2023)
1	15	Joe Berry	Port Adelaide	Murray Bushrangers	Talent League	←West Coast (draft)←Carlton
1	16	Bo Allan	West Coast	Peel Thunder	WAFL	←Port Adelaide (draft)←Gold Coast←Western Bulldogs (2023)
1	17	Murphy Reid	Fremantle	Sandringham Dragons	Talent League	←Richmond←Carlton←Hawthorn
1	18	Oliver Hannaford	Greater Western Sydney	Greater Western Victoria Rebels	Talent League	
1	19	Harrison Oliver	Greater Western Sydney	Sandringham Dragons	Talent League	Free agency compensation pick (Perryman)
1	20	Cooper Hynes	Western Bulldogs	Dandenong Stingrays	Talent League	←Geelong
1	21	Luke Trainor	Richmond	Sandringham Dragons	Talent League	←Fremantle←Port Adelaide (2023)
1	22	Jesse Dattoli	Sydney	Northern Knights	Talent League	
1	23	Harry Armstrong	Richmond	Sandringham Dragons	Talent League	←Brisbane Lions
1	24	Cody Angove	Greater Western Sydney	Claremont	WAFL	Free agency compensation pick (Cumming)
1	25	Sam Marshall	Brisbane Lions	Sandringham Dragons	Talent League	Academy selection, matched bid by Sydney
Priority	26	Ned Bowman	Sydney	Norwood	SANFL	←North Melbourne (2023)
Priority	27	Matt Whitlock	North Melbourne	Murray Bushrangers	Talent League	←Richmond (draft)←Gold Coast←North Melbourne (2023)
2	28	Thomas Sims	Richmond	Northern Knights	Talent League	
2	29	Lachie Jaques	Western Bulldogs	Geelong Falcons	Talent League	←North Melbourne
2	30	Jobe Shanahan	West Coast	Bendigo Pioneers	Talent League	
2	31	Josh Dolan	Western Bulldogs	Sandringham Dragons	Talent League	←Brisbane Lions←St Kilda←Adelaide (2023)
2	32	James Barrat	St Kilda	Bendigo Pioneers	Talent League	←Essendon (draft) ←Melbourne ←Adelaide ←Melbourne (2023)
2	33	Jack Whitlock	Port Adelaide	Murray Bushrangers	Talent League	←Gold Coast
2	34	Charlie Nicholls	Fremantle	Central District	SANFL	←St Kilda (2023)
2	35	Noah Mraz	Hawthorn	Dandenong Stingrays	Talent League	←Collingwood (2023)
2	36	Jack Ough	Greater Western Sydney	Greater Western Victoria Rebels	Talent League	←Brisbane Lions (draft)←Carlton
2	37	Kayle Gerreyn	Essendon	West Perth	WAFL	←Brisbane Lions (draft)←Western Bulldogs (draft)
2	38	Christian Moraes	Port Adelaide	Eastern Ranges	Talent League	←Collingwood←Hawthorn (2023)
2	39	Angus Clarke	Essendon	Glenelg	SANFL	←Brisbane Lions (draft)←Greater Western Sydney (draft)
2	40	Harry O'Farrell	Carlton	Calder Cannons	Talent League	←Geelong
3	41	Riley Bice	Sydney	Werribee	VFL	←North Melbourne
3	42	Ty Gallop	Brisbane Lions	Maroochydore	QAFL	Academy selection, matched bid by Geelong
3	43	Ben Camporeale	Carlton	Glenelg	SANFL	Father–son selection (son of Scott Camporeale), matched bid by Geelong
3	44	Jay Polkinghorne	Geelong	Norwood	SANFL	←St Kilda←Brisbane Lions←Richmond←West Coast (2023)
3	45	Hugh Boxshall	St Kilda	Claremont	WAFL	←Essendon (draft)←St Kilda (draft)←Melbourne (2023)
3	46	Tom Gross	West Coast	Oakleigh Chargers	Talent League	←Port Adelaide (draft)←Gold Coast←Carlton (2023)←Essendon (2023)
3	47	Joel Cochran	Collingwood	UNSW-Eastern Suburbs	AFL Sydney	Academy eligible for Sydney but they did not match
3	48	Lucca Grego	West Coast	Western Jets	Talent League	←Brisbane Lions (draft)←Essendon (draft)←Greater Western Sydney←St Kilda (2023)←Carlton (2023)
3	49	Cooper Bell	Gold Coast	Belconnen	AFL Canberra	Academy eligible for Greater Western Sydney but they did not match
3	50	Charlie West	Collingwood	Woodville-West Torrens	SANFL	←Hawthorn (2023)
3	51	Sam Davidson	Western Bulldogs	Richmond	VFL	←Brisbane Lions (draft)←Greater Western Sydney (draft)
3	52	Jacob Molier	Geelong	Sturt	SANFL	
3	53	Alex Dodson	St Kilda	Sturt	SANFL	←Essendon (draft)←Brisbane Lions (draft)←Collingwood←Port Adelaide
3	54	Lucas Camporeale	Carlton	Glenelg	SANFL	Father–son selection (son of Scott Camporeale), matched bid by Sydney
3	55	Riak Andrew	Sydney	Dandenong Stingrays	Talent League	Next Generation Academy eligible for Melbourne but they did not match
3	56	Will Hayes	Collingwood	Claremont	WAFL	←Brisbane Lions
4	57	Luke Urquhart	North Melbourne	East Fremantle	WAFL	
4	58	Jasper Alger	Richmond	Oakleigh Chargers	Talent League	←Gold Coast (draft)
4	59	Tyler Welsh	Adelaide	Woodville-West Torrens	SANFL	Father–son selection (son of Scott Welsh)
4	60	Patrick Said	St Kilda	Calder Cannons	Talent League	←Brisbane Lions (draft)
4	61	Rhys Unwin	Essendon	Greater Western Victoria Rebels	Talent League	←Melbourne
4	62	Luke Kennedy	Western Bulldogs	Sandringham Dragons	Talent League	←Collingwood (draft)←Brisbane Lions←Carlton←Gold Coast (2023)
4	63	Jaren Carr	Fremantle	South Fremantle	WAFL	Father–son selection (son of Matthew Carr) ←St Kilda (2023)
4	64	Cody Anderson	Hawthorn	Eastern Ranges	Talent League	Next Generation Academy selection (Indigenous) ←Port Adelaide (2023)←Essendon (2023)←Carlton (2023)
4	65	Hamish Davis	West Coast	Claremont	WAFL	←Carlton←Brisbane Lions←Hawthorn (2023)
4	66	Lennox Hofmann	Geelong	Sandringham Dragons	Talent League	Next Generation Academy eligible for St Kilda but they did not match
5	67	River Stevens	North Melbourne	Geelong Falcons	Talent League	Father–son selection (son of Anthony Stevens)
5	68	Aidan Johnson	Melbourne	Werribee	VFL	
5	69	Keighton Matofai-Forbes	Geelong	Western Jets	Talent League	
5	70	Zak Johnson	Essendon	Northern Knights	Talent League	
5	71	Logan Smith	Greater Western Sydney	Queanbeyan	AFL Canberra	Academy selection

=== Rookie elevations ===
Table of rookie elevations
Player	Club	Reference
Mark Keane	Adelaide	
Jordan Boyd	Carlton	
Karl Worner	Fremantle	
Bodhi Uwland	Gold Coast	
Jake Melksham	Melbourne	
Judd McVee	Melbourne	
Jed McEntee	Port Adelaide	
Tylar Young	Richmond	
Max Heath	St Kilda	
Cooper Sharman	St Kilda	

== 2024 pre-season draft ==
Round	Pick	Player	Club	Recruited from		Notes
Round	Pick	Player	Club	Club	League	Notes
1	1	Jack Gunston	Hawthorn	Hawthorn	AFL	Redrafted player
1	2	Sam Day	Brisbane Lions	Gold Coast	AFL	

== 2025 rookie draft ==
Rookie draft selections
Round	Pick	Player	Club	Recruited from		Notes
Round	Pick	Player	Club	Club	League	Notes
1	1	Toby Pink	North Melbourne	North Melbourne	AFL	Redrafted player
1	2	Passed	West Coast	—	—	
1	3	Harry Schoenberg	Adelaide	Adelaide	AFL	Redrafted player
1	4	Max Knobel	Gold Coast	Fremantle	AFL	
1	5	Brad Crouch	St Kilda	St Kilda	AFL	Redrafted player
1	6	Archer Day-Wicks	Essendon	Bendigo Pioneers	Talent League	
1	7	Aiden Riddle	Fremantle	Claremont	WAFL	
1	8	Oleg Markov	Collingwood	Collingwood	AFL	Redrafted player
1	9	Harry Charleson	Carlton	Greater Western Victoria Rebels	Talent League	
1	10	Passed	Western Bulldogs	—	—	
1	11	Lachlan Keeffe	Greater Western Sydney	Greater Western Sydney	AFL	Redrafted player
1	12	Xavier Ivisic	Geelong	Geelong Falcons	Talent League	
1	13	Tom Cochrane	Port Adelaide	Central District	SANFL	
1	14	Blake Leidler	Sydney	Oakleigh Chargers	Talent League	
1	15	Darragh Joyce	Brisbane Lions	Brisbane Lions	AFL	Redrafted player
2	16	Chris Burgess	Adelaide	Adelaide	AFL	Redrafted player
2	17	Asher Eastham	Gold Coast	Gippsland Power	Talent League	
2	18	Passed	Essendon	—	—	
2	19	Passed	Fremantle	—	—	
2	20	Ash Johnson	Collingwood	Collingwood	AFL	Redrafted player
2	21	Passed	Carlton	—	—	
2	22	Jacob Wehr	Greater Western Sydney	Greater Western Sydney	AFL	Redrafted player
2	23	Patrick Retschko	Geelong	Oakleigh Chargers	Talent League	
2	24	Passed	Port Adelaide	—	—	
2	25	Ben Paton	Sydney	St Kilda	AFL	
2	26	Darcy Craven	Brisbane Lions	Brisbane Lions	AFL	Redrafted player
3	27	Passed	Gold Coast	—	—	
3	28	Passed	Essendon	—	—	
3	29	Passed	Carlton	—	—	
3	30	Josh Fahey	Greater Western Sydney	Greater Western Sydney	AFL	Redrafted player
3	31	Joe Pike	Geelong	Geelong Falcons	Talent League	
3	32	Aaron Francis	Sydney	Sydney	AFL	Redrafted player
4	33	Joel Hamling	Sydney	Sydney	AFL	Redrafted player

=== Category B rookie selections ===
Table of Category B rookie selections
Name	Club	Origin	Note	Ref
Matt Duffy	Carlton	Longford GAA	International selection (Ireland)	
Jayden Nguyen	Essendon	Calder Cannons (Talent League)	Next Generation Academy selection (Vietnamese descent)	
Cillian Burke	Geelong	Kerry GAA	International selection (Ireland)	
Zak Evans	Gold Coast	Melbourne Renegades (BBL)	Three-year non-registered player (cricket)	
Lachie Gulbin	Gold Coast	Broadbeach (QAFL)	Academy selection	
Josaia Delana	Greater Western Sydney	East Coast Eagles (Sydney AFL)	Academy selection	
Jaime Uhr-Henry	Hawthorn	Dandenong Rangers (NBL1 South)	Three-year non-registered player (basketball)	
Matt Hill	Hawthorn	Melbourne Storm Academy (NRL)	Three-year non-registered player (rugby league)	
Ricky Mentha	Melbourne	Gippsland Power (Talent League)	Next Generation Academy selection (Indigenous)	
Jacob Moss	Port Adelaide	Sturt Sabres (NBL1 Central)	Three-year non-registered player (basketball)	
Benny Barrett	Port Adelaide	South Adelaide (SANFL)	Next Generation Academy selection (Papuan descent)	
Eamonn Armstrong	St Kilda	Meath GAA	International selection (Ireland)	
Malakai Champion	West Coast	Subiaco (WAFL)	Next Generation Academy selection (Indigenous)	

=== Pre-season supplemental selection period ===
Player	Club	Recruited from		Notes	Ref
Player	Club	Club	League	Notes	Ref
Lachlan McAndrew	Adelaide	Sydney	AFL		
Matt Carroll	Carlton	Carlton	AFL	Re-signed player	
Francis Evans	Carlton	Port Adelaide	AFL		
Will White	Carlton	Carlton	VFL		
Jaxon Prior	Essendon	Brisbane Lions	AFL		
Tom Edwards	Essendon	Swan Districts	WAFL		
Quinton Narkle	Fremantle	Port Adelaide	AFL		
Isaiah Dudley	Fremantle	Central District	SANFL		
Ben Jepson	Gold Coast	Southport	VFL		
Jai Culley	Melbourne	West Coast	AFL		
Jack Henderson	Melbourne	Werribee	VFL		
Josh Lai	Port Adelaide	Cheltenham	SFNL		
Harry Boyd	St Kilda	Norwood	SANFL		
Sandy Brock	West Coast	Gold Coast	AFL		

== See also ==
- 2024 AFL Women's draft
