= Justin Perkins (footballer) =

Australian rules footballer (born 1983)

Personal information
- Full name: Justin Perkins
- Born: 7 January 1983 (age 43)
- Original team: Heywood/North Ballarat Rebels
- Height: 188 cm (6 ft 2 in)
- Weight: 87 kg (192 lb)

Playing career^{1}
Years	Club	Games (Goals)
2005	Kangaroos	4 (0)
- ^{1} Playing statistics correct to the end of 2005.

Justin Perkins (born 7 January 1983) is an Australian rules footballer who played with the Kangaroos in the Australian Football League (AFL).

Originally from Heywood, Perkins is a defender and played for the North Ballarat Rebels in the TAC Cup. He was named in the TAC Cup Team of the Year in 2001 and also won North Ballarat's best and fairest award that year, but he didn't get drafted to the AFL.

In 2002 and 2003, Perkins played for the North Ballarat Football Club in the Victorian Football League, before university study took him to Western Australia in 2004. He made 20 appearances for Perth in the 2004 WAFL season and was picked up by the Kangaroos in the rookie draft.

He played four senior AFL games in 2005, but none in the 2006 season, after which he was delisted.
