= Luker Kentfield =

Australian rules footballer (born 2005)

Personal information
- Born: 10 September 2005 (age 21)
- Original team: Carine JFC
- Draft: No. 11, 2024 mid-season rookie draft
- Height: 194 cm (6 ft 4 in)
- Position: Key forward

Club information
- Current club: Melbourne
- Number: 44

Playing career
Years	Club	Games (Goals)
2026–	Melbourne	3 (1)

Luker Kentfield (born 10 September 2005) is an Australian rules footballer who plays for Melbourne in the Australian Football League (AFL).

Hailing from Western Australia, Kentfield was educated at St Mark's Anglican Community School in Perth, playing for Carine Junior Football Club, before making his way up through the junior sides of Subiaco.

Kentfield, a key forward, was selected by Melbourne with pick 11 in the 2024 mid-season rookie draft. His first pre-season was interrupted when he contracted pneumonia during the Christmas break which required hospitalisation, before putting together 17 VFL appearances for the Casey Demons, kicking 24 goals. He had more misfortune in the 2026 pre-season, injuring his knee when he collided with Richmond's Kane McAuliffe during a practice match, delaying an expected AFL debut early in the season. In the round 13 King's Birthday match against Collingwood, Kentfield marked his AFL debut with a goal in an eight-point win, and held his spot for the next two rounds. He subsequently signed a contract extension to the end of the 2027 season.
