= Jack Ough =

Australian rules footballer (born 2006)

Personal information
- Born: 15 December 2006 (age 19)
- Original team: Wentworth District
- Draft: No. 36, 2024 national draft
- Height: 194 cm (6 ft 4 in)
- Position: Midfielder

Club information
- Current club: Greater Western Sydney
- Number: 28

Playing career
| Years | Club | Games (Goals) |
| 2026– | Greater Western Sydney | 5 (1) |

Jack Ough (born 15 December 2006) is an Australian rules footballer who plays for the Greater Western Sydney Giants in the Australian Football League (AFL).

Ough played his early junior football in the Sunraysia Football League with Western District, where his father Andrew had been a ruckman and later committeeman. He is a nephew of AFLW player Hannah Priest. After moving to Ballarat to board at St Patrick's College, Ough played in the juniors for East Point.

A midfielder, Ough competed in the Talent League with both the Bendigo Pioneers and Greater Western Victoria Rebels. He had a strong finals series with the Rebels in 2024, highlighted by a 33-disposal performance in a win over the Geelong Falcons, and represented Vic Country in four games at the AFL National Championships.

Ough was selected by the Giants with pick 26 in the 2024 national draft. His first season, spent in the VFL, was ended early when he had to undergo shoulder surgery. He had a standout VFL season on his return in 2026, averaging over 30 disposals to be named on the interchange bench in the VFL Team of the Year. Late in the 2026 AFL season, Ough made five appearances for the Giants, debuting against Fremantle in Canberra.
