= Lachie Jaques =

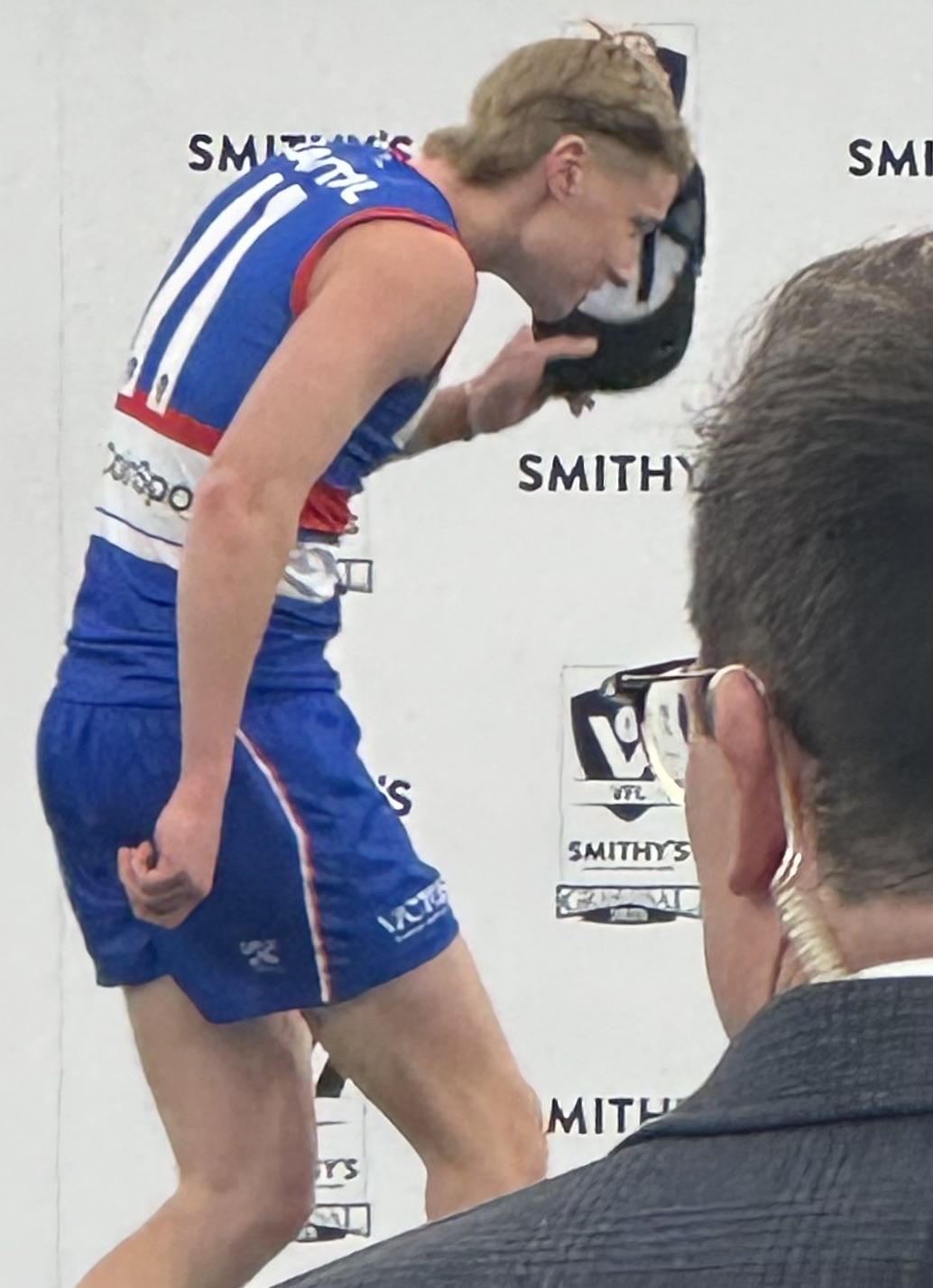
- Jaques in September 2025

Personal information
- Born: 1 June 2006 (age 20)
- Original team: Geelong Falcons (Talent League)
- Draft: No. 29, 2024 AFL draft
- Debut: Opening Round, 2026, Western Bulldogs vs. Brisbane Lions, at The Gabba
- Height: 185 cm (6 ft 1 in)
- Position: Defender

Club information
- Current club: Western Bulldogs
- Number: 11

Playing career^{1}
Years	Club	Games (Goals)
2025–	Western Bulldogs	9 (0)
- ^{1} Playing statistics correct to the end of round 22, 2026.

Career highlights
- VFL premiership player: 2025

Lachie Jaques (born 1 June 2006) is a professional Australian rules footballer who plays for the Western Bulldogs in the Australian Football League (AFL).

== Junior career ==
Jaques played junior football with St Marys before progressing to the Geelong Falcons in the Coates Talent League. He was selected by the Western Bulldogs with pick 29 in the 2024 AFL draft.

== AFL career ==
Jaques made his AFL debut in the opening round of the 2026 season against the reigning premiers Brisbane Lions at the Gabba. In his debut match, he recorded 16 disposals and four marks, along with four tackles, contributing to the Western Bulldogs’ win against the reigning premiers by only 5 points.

== Statistics ==
Updated to the end of round 22, 2026.

Legend
G	Goals	K	Kicks	D	Disposals	T	Tackles
B	Behinds	H	Handballs	M	Marks

Season	Team	No.	Games	Totals							Averages (per game)							Votes
Season	Team	No.	Games	G	B	K	H	D	M	T	G	B	K	H	D	M	T	Votes
2025	Western Bulldogs	11	0	—	—	—	—	—	—	—	—	—	—	—	—	—	—	0
2026	Western Bulldogs	11	9	0	1	92	46	138	42	20	0.0	0.1	10.2	5.1	15.3	4.7	2.2	0
Career			9	0	1	92	46	138	42	20	0.0	0.1	10.2	5.1	15.3	4.7	2.2	0
