= Luke Kennedy (footballer) =

Personal information
- Born: 11 October 2006 (age 20)
- Original team: Ormond JFC
- Draft: No. 62, 2024 national draft
- Height: 181 cm (5 ft 11 in)
- Position: Midfielder/Forward

Club information
- Current club: Western Bulldogs
- Number: 35

Playing career
Years	Club	Games (Goals)
2026–	Western Bulldogs	8 (2)

Luke Kennedy (born 11 October 2006) is an Australian rules footballer who plays for the Western Bulldogs in the Australian Football League (AFL).

Kennedy grew up in Melbourne and attended McKinnon Secondary College. He was involved with Ormond from an early age, starting out as a water boy when his older brothers played for the club, while also stepping in as an umpire on occasion. Used as an inside midfielder, Kennedy won Ormond's senior best and fairest award as a 16-year old in 2023.

A Sandringham Dragons player in 2023 and 2024, Kennedy was overlooked for Vic Metro, before getting selected by the Western Bulldogs with pick 62 in the 2024 national draft.

Kennedy joined the Bulldogs in the 2025 pre-season and made a mark by winning the club's 2 km time trial. He won a VFL premiership with Footscray in 2025. During the 2026 AFL season, Kennedy made eight appearances in the senior team after debuting against Adelaide in round 14, and was part of the club's finals campaign. He subsequently signed a one-year contract extension through to the end of 2027.
