= Geelong Falcons =

Youth Australian rules football club

Names
- Full name: Geelong Falcons Football Club
- Nickname: Falcons

2026 season
- After finals: 11th
- Home-and-away season: 11th

Club details
- Founded: 1992; 34 years ago
- Colours: Navy Blue White
- Competition: Talent League
- Premierships: Talent League (3) 1992, 2000, 2017
- Ground: Highton Recreation Reserve

Other information
- Official website: GFFC

The Geelong Falcons is a youth Australian rules football representative club in the Talent League, the Victorian statewide under-18s competition in Victoria, Australia.

The club takes in talented junior players from the Geelong, Colac and Warrnambool regions in order to prepare them for AFL selection. There is an under-15 V-Line cup side and an under-16 side, but the club's main focus is its under-18 side, who play a longer season.

In 2007, Jimmy Bartel became the first ex-Falcon to win the AFL Brownlow Medal, for the league's best and fairest player, while Jonathan Brown became the first ex-Falcon to win the Coleman Medal for the most goals in the season.

Gary Ablett Jnr also became the first ex-Falcon to win the Leigh Matthews Trophy, for being voted the Most Valuable Player by the AFL Players Association.

Hawthorn half-back Luke Hodge became the first Falcon to win the Norm Smith Medal for his best on ground performance in the 2008 Grand Final against the Geelong Cats.

Nick Maxwell became the first Geelong Falcons player to captain a premiership team when he led Collingwood to the 2010 AFL Premiership.

== Honours ==
- Premierships (3): 1992, 2000, 2017
- Runners-up (2): 1994, 1998
- Minor Premiers (5): 1992, 1996, 2009, 2013, 2024
- Wooden Spoon (1): 2019

=== Talent League Girls ===
- Premierships (1): 2018
- Runners-up (1): 2021

== Notable Falcons players ==
- Jonathan Brown - Brisbane Lions: Coleman Medallist 2007; All-Australian 2007, 2009; Premiership Player 2001, 2002, 2003; Brisbane co-captain 2007–2008; Brisbane sole captain 2009–2014
- Gary Ablett, Jr. - Geelong/Gold Coast: All-Australian 2007, 2008, 2009, 2010, 2011, 2012, 2013, 2014; All-Australian captain 2011; AFLPA MVP 2007, 2008, 2009; Premiership Player 2007, 2009; Brownlow Medallist 2009, 2013; Gold Coast captain 2011–2016
- Jimmy Bartel - Geelong: Brownlow Medallist 2007; All-Australian 2007, 2008; North Smith Medalist 2011; Premiership Player 2007, 2009, 2011
- Luke Hodge - Hawthorn: Number One Draft Pick 2001; All-Australian 2005, 2008, 2010, All-Australian Captain 2010; Norm Smith Medallist 2008, 2014; Premiership Player 2008, 2013, 2014, 2015 Hawthorn captain 2011–2016
- Chris Heffernan - Essendon/Melbourne: Premiership Player 2000
- Matthew Primus - Fitzroy/Port Adelaide: All-Australian 2001, 2002; Port Adelaide Captain 2001-05, Port Adelaide Coach 2010–2012
- Cameron Ling - Geelong: All-Australian 2007; Premiership Player 2007, 2009, 2011, Premiership Captain 2011; Geelong Captain 2010–2011
- Matthew Scarlett - Geelong: All-Australian 2003, 2004, 2007, 2008, 2009, 2011; Premiership Player 2007, 2009, 2011
- Scott Lucas - Essendon: Premiership Player 2000
- Jordan Lewis - Hawthorn/Melbourne: Premiership Player 2008, 2013, 2014, 2015
- Nick Maxwell - Collingwood: Collingwood Captain 2008, Premiership Player/Captain 2010
- Amon Buchanan - Sydney/Brisbane Lions: Premiership Player 2005
- Matthew Capuano - North Melbourne/St Kilda: Premiership Player 1996 and 1999
- Mark Blake - Geelong: Premiership Player 2009
- Allen Christensen - Geelong: Premiership Player 2011
- Will Schofield - West Coast Eagles: Premiership Player 2018
- Patrick Dangerfield: Brownlow medal 2016, all Australian 6x and premiership player 2022

== Draftees ==
Many notable players in the Australian Football League have been recruited from the Geelong Falcons. These players include:

- 1993: Glenn Gorman
- 1994: Scott Lucas, Tony Brown, Chris Hemley, Jeremy Dyer, Shaun Baxter, Peter Bird, Nathan Saunders, Scott Taylor
- 1995: Simon Fletcher, Joe McLaren, Nigel Credlin, Ryan Grinter
- 1996: Chris Heffernan, Bowen Lockwood, Brent Grgic, Jacob Rhodes
- 1997: James Rahilly, Matthew Scarlett, Lincoln Reynolds
- 1998: David A. Clarke, Steven Baker, Jay Solomon, David Loats, Marc Dragicevic, Tim van der Klooster
- 1999: David Haynes, Jonathan Brown, Tim Clarke, Cameron Ling, Bill Nicholls
- 2000: Sam Hunt, Sam Chapman, Andrew Siegert
- 2001: Luke Hodge, Jimmy Bartel, Luke Molan, Matt Maguire, Tom Davidson, Joel Reynolds, Gary Ablett Jr.
- 2002: Tim Callan, Lochlan Veale, Brent Moloney
- 2003: Mark Blake, Nathan Foley, Luke Buckland, James Allan
- 2004: Jordan Lewis, John Meesen, Tim Sheringham
- 2005: Shaun Higgins, Danny Stanley, Clint Bartram
- 2006: Travis Boak, Daniel O'Keefe, Will Schofield, Simon Hogan, Ryan Williams, Peter Hardy
- 2007: Lachlan Henderson, Patrick Dangerfield, Jack Steven, Adam Donohue, Jaxson Barham, Guy O'Keefe, Ed Curnow, Chris Kangars
- 2008: Ayce Cordy, Luke Rounds, Ben Bucovaz, Jordie McKenzie, Luke Delaney, Tom Simpkin
- 2009: Ben Cunnington, Gary Rohan, Jasper Pittard, Callum Bartlett, Allen Christensen, Luke Thompson, Joe Dare
- 2010: Billie Smedts, Jayden Pitt, Jeremy Taylor, Troy Davis, Cameron Delaney, Luke Dahlhaus, Josh Walker, Cameron Johnston
- 2011: Taylor Adams, Devon Smith, Jackson Merrett, Jay Lever, Jed Bews, Jai Sheahan, Andrew Boseley
- 2012: Mason Wood, Josh Saunders
- 2013: Darcy Lang, Darcy Gardiner, Lewis Taylor, Samuel Russell, Nick Bourke
- 2014: Paddy McCartin, Hugh Goddard, Teia Miles, Jackson Nelson, Zaine Cordy, Lewis Melican
- 2015: Darcy Parish, Charlie Curnow, Tom Doedee, Rhys Mathieson
- 2016: Alex Witherden, Sean Darcy, Jack Henry, Sam Simpson
- 2017: Matthew Ling, Tom McCartin, James Worpel, Gryan Miers, Josh Jaska
- 2018: Sam Walsh, Ned McHenry, Connor Idun, Brayden Ham, Oscar Brownless, Blake Schlensog
- 2019: Cooper Stephens
- 2020: Tanner Bruhn, Oliver Henry, Charlie Lazzaro, Cameron Fleeton
- 2021: Toby Conway, Mitchell Knevitt, Cooper Whyte
- 2022: Jhye Clark
- 2023: Angus Hastie, Thomas Anastasopolous
- 2024: Will McLachlan, Lachie Jaques, River Stevens, Xavier Ivisic, Joe Pike
- 2025: Josh Lindsay, Hugo Mikunda, Jesse Mellor
