= Ned Bowman =

Australian rules footballer (born 2006)

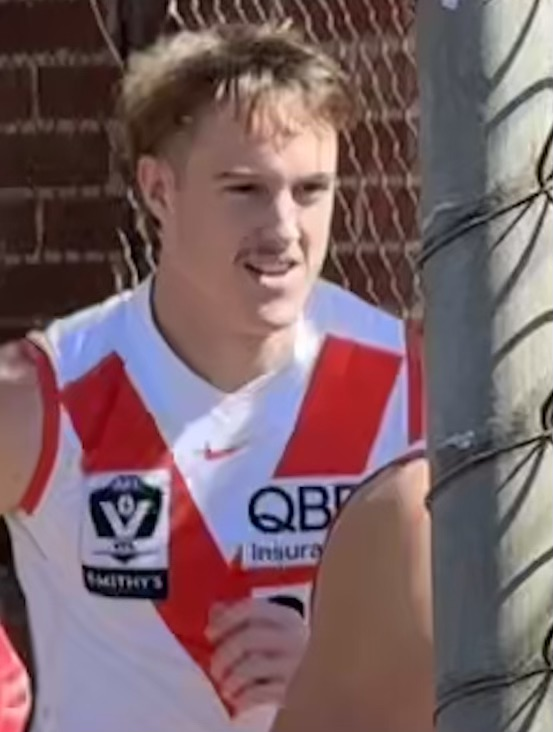
- Bowman in April 2026

Personal information
- Full name: Ned Bowman
- Born: 12 September 2006 (age 20); Orroroo, South Australia
- Original team: Norwood (SANFL)
- Draft: No. 26, 2024 AFL draft
- Height: 186 cm (6 ft 1 in)
- Position: Forward

Club information
- Current club: Sydney Swans
- Number: 23

Playing career^{1}
Years	Club	Games (Goals)
2025–	Sydney Swans	0 (0)
- ^{1} Playing statistics correct to the end of 2025.

Ned Bowman (born 12 September 2006) is an Australian rules footballer who plays for the Sydney Swans in the Australian Football League (AFL). He was selected with pick 26 in the 2024 AFL draft, following a standout season with Norwood in the South Australian National Football League (SANFL) under-18 competition.

Bowman gained national attention in 2024 after taking a highly publicized mark during a SANFL match that drew comparisons to some of the AFL’s most iconic aerial plays. The moment received widespread media coverage and was viewed as a key factor in his rising draft stock.

== Early life ==
Bowman was born in Orroroo, South Australia. He is the son of Lachlan Bowman, a former Norwood player who featured in over 150 games and was part of the club's 1997 premiership team. Ned credits his family's football background as an influence on his sporting development.

He played junior football for Norwood and was a member of their under-18 side. In 2023, he missed most of the season due to injury. He returned in 2024 to play ten games and led Norwood’s under-18 goal-kicking with 18 goals.

His standout moment came in April 2024, when he took a contested mark over multiple opponents during a match against Woodville-West Torrens. The mark received national media coverage and was widely shared online.

== AFL career ==
Bowman was drafted by the Sydney Swans with the 26th pick in the 2024 AFL draft. He was allocated the number 23 guernsey, previously worn by Lance Franklin. In an interview with AFL.com.au, Bowman acknowledged the significance of the number and said he embraced the responsibility that came with it.

== Playing style ==
Bowman is regarded as an athletic forward known for his vertical leap, contested marking, and goal sense. Standing at 186 cm, he is noted for his ability to create scoring opportunities both in open play and in contests.
