= Greater Western Victoria Rebels =

Names
- Full name: Greater Western Victoria Rebels Football Club
- Nickname: Rebels

2026 season
- After finals: 8th
- Home-and-away season: 10th

Club details
- Founded: 1993; 33 years ago
- Colours: Black White Grey
- Competition: Talent League
- Premierships: Talent League (1) 1997
- Ground: Eureka Stadium, North Ballarat

Other information
- Official website: GWVRFC

The Greater Western Victoria Rebels is an Australian rules football club which plays in the Talent League, the statewide under-18s competition in Victoria, Australia.

They recruit players from the Ballarat, Wimmera and South West Victorian regions, including from Warrnambool, Hamilton, and Horsham.

Initially known as the Ballarat Rebels and wearing green and gold, the team was established in 1993 as one of four regional under-18s clubs, set up as part of a plan by the AFL Commission to have clubs set in all regions of the state of Victoria. The club became affiliated with the new VFL's North Ballarat Football Club in 1996, and changed its name to North Ballarat Rebels and its colours to black and white to reflect this. In January 2017, the club again changed its name to Greater Western Victoria Rebels to reflect their expanded recruitment zone.

This was to help aid in player development and the process of the AFL draft, which allows U18 players the opportunity to be selected by AFL clubs.

Greater Western Victoria has produced many notable AFL players including Adam Goodes, Drew Petrie, Troy Chaplin, Jed Adcock, Tim Notting, Shannon Watt, James Walker and Shane O'Bree.

== Honours ==
- Premierships (1): 1997
- Runners-up (1): 2024
- Minor Premiers (3): 2006, 2012, 2015
- Wooden Spoons (1): 2013

== Draftees ==
- 1994: Brad Cassidy, Mark Orchard, Tony Bourke, Ross Funcke, Gerard Jess
- 1996: Brent Tuckey, Tim Notting
- 1997: James Walker, Shane O'Bree, Shannon Watt, Adam Goodes, Marcus Picken, Sam Cranage
- 2000: Drew Petrie, Jeremy Humm
- 2002: Luke Brennan, Tristan Cartledge
- 2003: Jed Adcock, Troy Chaplin, Adam Campbell
- 2004: Matt Rosa
- 2005: Stephen Owen
- 2006: Nathan Brown, James Frawley, Mitchell Brown, Shaun Grigg, Tim Houlihan, Matt Tyler
- 2007: Clayton Hinkley, Kyle Cheney, Matt Austin
- 2008: Nick Suban, Jordan Roughead, Tim Ruffles, Will Young
- 2009: David Astbury, Matthew Dea, Josh Cowan
- 2010: Lucas Cook, Tom McDonald, Ben Mabon
- 2011: Sebastian Ross, Rory Taggert, Tom Downie, Nick O'Brien, Brad Crouch*, Kurt Aylett+, Jeremy Cameron+
- 2012: Dominic Barry†, Jake Neade†, Michael Close, Tanner Smith, Martin Gleeson, Jake Lloyd
- 2013: Matt Crouch, Louis Herbert, Dallas Willsmore
- 2014: Oscar McDonald, Dan Butler, Jesse Palmer
- 2015: Jacob Hopper, Daniel Rioli, Darcy Tucker, Yestin Eades
- 2016: Hugh McCluggage, Jarrod Berry, Cedric Cox, Willem Drew, Tom Williamson, Jamaine Jones
- 2017: Lloyd Meek, Flynn Appleby
- 2018: Tom Berry
- 2019: Jay Rantall
- 2020: Harry Sharp, Nick Stevens
- 2021: Josh Gibcus, Sam Butler
- 2022: Aaron Cadman, James van Es, Hugh Bond
- 2023: Luamon Lual, Joel Freijah, Lachlan Charleson, George Stevens
- 2024: Sam Lalor, Jonty Faull, Oliver Hannaford, Jack Ough, Rhys Unwin
- 2025: Talor Byrne
- 2026: Ethan Drever

Notes:

- * Denotes being selected in Greater Western Sydney Mini-Draft (2011)
- + Denotes player was pre-listed by Greater Western Sydney (2011)
- † Denotes player was pre-listed and on-traded by Greater Western Sydney (2012)
- Sources:1994-2009: AFL Record Season Guide 2010

== Team of the Year ==
- 1993: -
- 1994: Shane Snibson, Brad Cassidy
- 1995: Julian Field
- 1996: Brent Tuckey, Shane O'Bree
- 1997: James Walker, Winis Imbi
- 1998: Marc Greig
- 1999: Jeremy Clayton
- 2000: Shane Hutchinson, Drew Petrie
- 2001: Justin Perkins
- 2002: Adam Fisher
- 2003: Jed Adcock, Matt Sharkey
- 2004: Matt Rosa
- 2005: Bill Driscoll, Steve Clifton
- 2006: Nathan Brown, James Frawley, Shaun Grigg, Lachlan George
- 2007: Kyle Cheney, Nick Suban
- 2008: Andrew Hooper, Jordan Roughead, Nick Suban
- 2009: Andrew Hooper
- 2010: Lucas Cook
- 2011: Brad Crouch, Nick O'Brien
- 2012: Nick Rippon, Matt Crouch, Jake Lloyd
