= Ryan Williams (Australian rules footballer) =

Australian rules footballer (born 1988)

Personal information
- Full name: Ryan Williams
- Born: 10 October 1988 (age 38)
- Original team: Geelong Falcons
- Height: 188 cm (6 ft 2 in)
- Weight: 85 kg (187 lb)

Playing career^{1}
Years	Club	Games (Goals)
2008	Port Adelaide	2 (0)
- ^{1} Playing statistics correct to the end of 2008.

Ryan Williams (born 10 October 1988) is an Australian rules footballer who played for Port Adelaide Football Club in the Australian Football League (AFL). He also previously played for the Central District Football Club in the South Australian National Football League (SANFL) and joined the Geelong Football Club in the Victorian Football League (VFL) in 2015.

Originally from TAC Cup side Geelong Falcons, Williams was drafted by Port Adelaide at number 83 in the 2006 AFL draft.

Williams played with SANFL club Central District when not required with Port Adelaide and made his AFL debut against Carlton in 2008. He plays as a small defender.

Williams was delisted by Port Adelaide at the end of the 2008 season.
