= Oliver Hannaford =

Personal information
- Born: 1 September 2006 (age 20)
- Original team: East Point JFC/Sandhurst/GWV Rebels
- Draft: No. 18, 2024 AFL draft
- Debut: Round 3, 2026, Greater Western Sydney vs. Collingwood, at Docklands Stadium
- Height: 180 cm (5 ft 11 in)
- Position: Forward

Club information
- Current club: Greater Western Sydney
- Number: 13

Playing career^{1}
Years	Club	Games (Goals)
2025–	Greater Western Sydney	5 (2)
- ^{1} Playing statistics correct to the end of round 22, 2026.

Oliver Hannaford (born 1 September 2006) is a professional Australian rules footballer who plays for the GWS Giants in the Australian Football League (AFL).

== Early life ==
Hannaford attended school at St Patrick's College, Ballarat. He played junior football for the East Point Junior Football Club and the Sandhurst Football Club.

== Junior career ==
Hannaford played for the GWV Rebels in the Talent League. In 2024, he averaged 16.7 disposals and 1.2 goals a game.

Hannaford also played for Vic Country in the Under 18 Championships in 2024, averaging 10.7 disposals.

== AFL career ==
Hannaford was selected with pick 18 of the 2024 AFL draft by the GWS Giants. In Round One of the 2026 VFL season, Hannaford had 31 disposals and three goals against St Kilda's VFL side. He was selected to make his AFL debut the following week against Collingwood.

Hannaford played five games in the 2026 AFL season, kicking his first AFL goal against Richmond in Round Five. A foot bone stress injury in June saw Hannaford miss a sizeable chunk of the season - he would return to play VFL late in the year.

== Statistics ==
Updated to the end of round 22, 2026.

Legend
G	Goals	K	Kicks	D	Disposals	T	Tackles
B	Behinds	H	Handballs	M	Marks

Season	Team	No.	Games	Totals							Averages (per game)							Votes
Season	Team	No.	Games	G	B	K	H	D	M	T	G	B	K	H	D	M	T	Votes
2026	Greater Western Sydney	13	5	2	3	26	20	46	12	6	0.4	0.6	5.2	4.0	9.2	2.4	1.2	0
Career			5	2	3	26	20	46	12	6	0.4	0.6	5.2	4.0	9.2	2.4	1.2	0
