= Tom Gross (footballer) =

Australian rules footballer (born 2006)

Personal information
- Born: 15 September 2006 (age 20)
- Original team: Kew Rovers
- Draft: No. 46, 2024 national draft
- Height: 181 cm (5 ft 11 in)
- Weight: 70 kg (154 lb)
- Position: Forward/Midfielder

Club information
- Current club: West Coast Eagles
- Number: 27

Playing career
Years	Club	Games (Goals)
2025–	West Coast Eagles	12 (3)

Tom Gross (born 15 September 2006) is an Australian rules footballer who plays for the West Coast Eagles in the Australian Football League (AFL).

Gross was a Kew Rovers junior and captained the 1st XVIII at Trinity Grammar School, twice winning their best and fairest award. He played for the Oakleigh Chargers in the Talent League and in 2024 earned All-Australian honours at the under-18s national championships as a member of the title-winning Vic Metro side.

In the 2024 national draft, Gross was selected by the Eagles at pick 46. He moved in with teammate Jeremy McGovern on his arrival in Perth. After amassing 17 disposals on debut against the GWS Giants in round four, Gross finished the 2025 season with eight league appearances, utilised as both a forward and midfielder. He played a further four AFL games in the 2026 season and is contracted until of end of 2027.
