= Zak Johnson (Australian footballer) =

Australian rules footballer

Personal information
- Full name: Zak Johnson
- Born: 24 December 2006 (age 19)
- Original team: Northern Knights (Talent League)
- Draft: No. 70, 2024 national draft
- Debut: Round 12, 2025, Essendon vs. Brisbane Lions, at The Gabba
- Height: 186 cm (6 ft 1 in)

Club information
- Current club: Essendon
- Number: 40

Playing career^{1}
Years	Club	Games (Goals)
2025–	Essendon	16 (0)
- ^{1} Playing statistics correct to the end of round 22, 2026.

Zak Johnson (born 24 December 2006) is a professional Australian rules footballer with the Essendon Football Club in the Australian Football League (AFL).

== Junior career ==
Johnson started his junior football career at the Epping Football Club, before moving to St Mary's, also in the Northern Football Netball League.

Johnson attended high school at Parade College, where he captained the school's football team to the 2024 Herald Sun Shield title, being named best on ground in the Grand Final. Johnson also captained the Northern Knights in the Talent League in his draft year. Johnson also represented Vic Metro at the U18 National Championships in 2023 as a 17-year old bottom age player, before returning to play for them again in his draft year as an 18-year old.

== AFL career ==
After his successful draft year with Vic Metro, the Northern Knights and Parade College, Johnson was drafted to the Essendon Football Club with pick 70 in the 2024 AFL draft.

Having impressed early in his first season while playing for the Bombers' reserves team in the Victorian Football League (VFL), Johnson was named for his senior debut in round 12 of the 2025 AFL season, debuting against the Brisbane Lions at The Gabba.

== Statistics ==
Updated to the end of round 22, 2026.

Legend
G	Goals	K	Kicks	D	Disposals	T	Tackles
B	Behinds	H	Handballs	M	Marks

Season	Team	No.	Games	Totals							Averages (per game)							Votes
Season	Team	No.	Games	G	B	K	H	D	M	T	G	B	K	H	D	M	T	Votes
2025	Essendon	40	9	0	0	70	48	118	32	12	0.0	0.0	7.8	5.3	13.1	3.6	1.3	0
2026	Essendon	40	7	0	0	63	49	112	29	2	0.0	0.0	9.0	7.0	16.0	4.1	0.3	0
Career			16	0	0	133	97	230	61	14	0.0	0.0	8.3	6.1	14.4	3.8	0.9	0
