= Jack Carroll (footballer, born 2002) =

Australian rules footballer

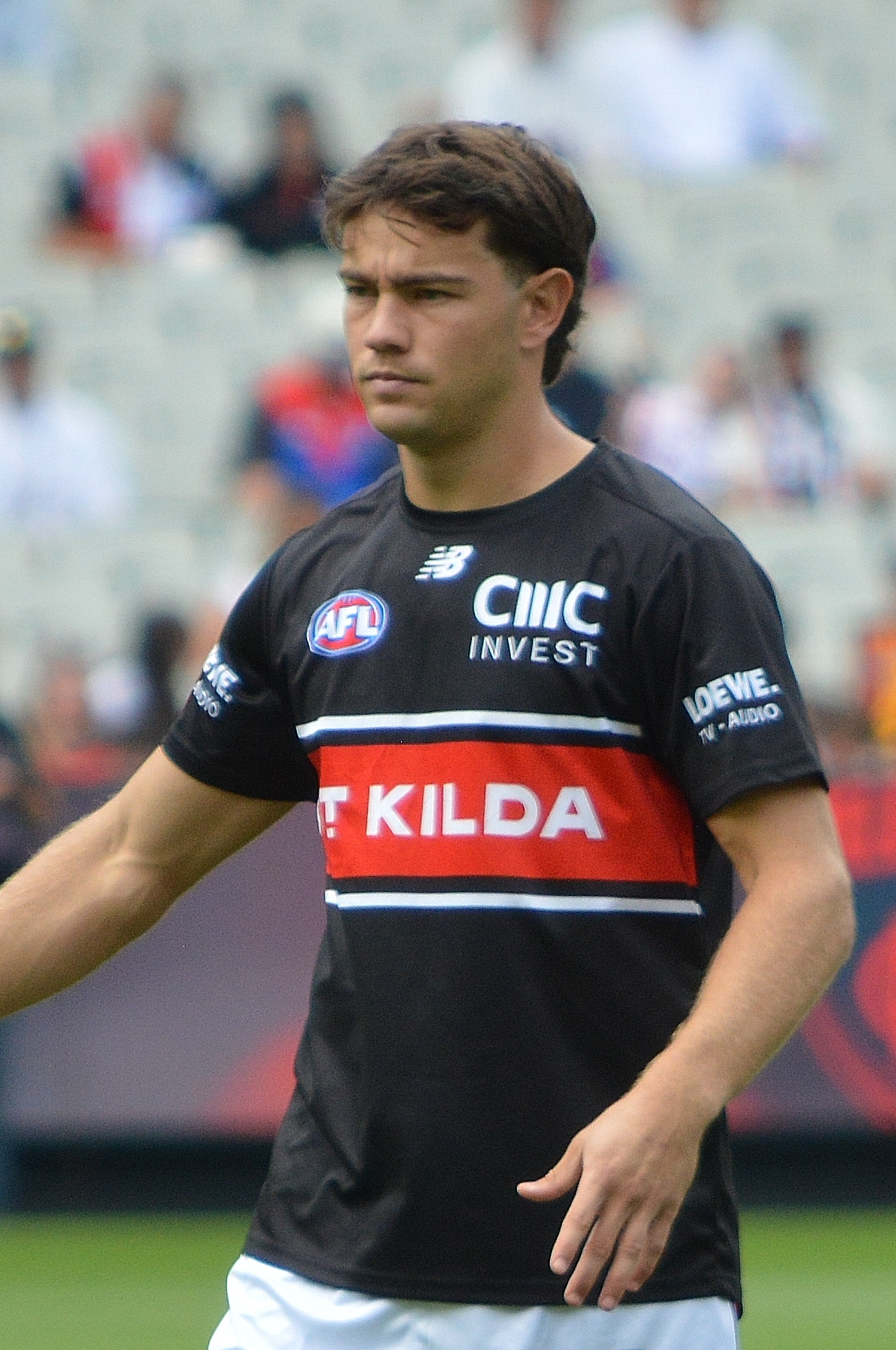
- Carroll in March 2026

Personal information
- Full name: Jack Carroll
- Born: 20 December 2002 (age 23); Geraldton, Western Australia
- Original team: East Fremantle
- Draft: No. 41, 2020 national draft
- Height: 187 cm (6 ft 2 in)
- Position: Defender

Club information
- Current club: St Kilda
- Number: 18

Playing career^{1}
Years	Club	Games (Goals)
2021–2024	Carlton	21 (5)
2025–	St Kilda	15 (0)
Total		36 (5)
- ^{1} Playing statistics correct to the end of round 22, 2026.

Jack Carroll (born 20 December 2002) is an Australian rules footballer who plays for the St Kilda Football Club in the Australian Football League (AFL). Jack previously played for the Carlton Football Club. Jack graduated from CBC Fremantle in 2020.

== Early life ==
Originally from the Chapman Valley, near Geraldton in the Mid West region of Western Australia, in 2020 he moved to finish his schooling at Christian Brothers College, Fremantle, and played for East Fremantle in the West Australian Football League colts. He was drafted with the 41st selection in the 2020 AFL draft.

== AFL career ==
=== Carlton ===
Carroll made his AFL debut in the seventh round of the 2022 AFL season, where he kicked a goal with his first kick. Carroll was delisted at the end of the 2024 AFL Season after 21 matches for Carlton.

=== St Kilda ===
Carroll was signed by St Kilda as a delisted free agent two weeks after being delisted by the Blues.

== Statistics ==
Updated to the end of round 22, 2026.

Legend
G	Goals	K	Kicks	D	Disposals	T	Tackles
B	Behinds	H	Handballs	M	Marks

Season	Team	No.	Games	Totals							Averages (per game)							Votes
Season	Team	No.	Games	G	B	K	H	D	M	T	G	B	K	H	D	M	T	Votes
2021	Carlton	16	0	—	—	—	—	—	—	—	—	—	—	—	—	—	—	0
2022	Carlton	16	5	1	1	45	21	66	24	3	0.2	0.2	9.0	4.2	13.2	4.8	0.6	0
2023	Carlton	16	1	0	0	1	3	4	0	1	0.0	0.0	1.0	3.0	4.0	0.0	1.0	0
2024	Carlton	16	15	4	3	83	67	150	35	22	0.3	0.2	5.5	4.5	10.0	2.3	1.5	0
2025	St Kilda	18	3	0	0	11	5	16	4	4	0.0	0.0	3.7	1.7	5.3	1.3	1.3	0
2026	St Kilda	18	12	0	2	124	61	185	73	23	0.0	0.2	10.3	5.1	15.4	6.1	1.9	0
Career			36	5	6	264	157	421	136	53	0.1	0.2	7.3	4.4	11.7	3.8	1.5	0
