= Brandon Zerk-Thatcher =

Australian rules footballer (born 1998)

Personal information
- Full name: Brandon Steven Zerk-Thatcher
- Born: 25 August 1998 (age 28)
- Original team: Sturt (SANFL)
- Draft: No. 66, 2017 national draft
- Debut: Round 22, 2019, Essendon vs. Fremantle, at Optus Stadium
- Height: 195 cm (6 ft 5 in)
- Weight: 92 kg (203 lb)
- Position: Key Defender

Club information
- Current club: Port Adelaide
- Number: 25

Playing career^{1}
Years	Club	Games (Goals)
2018–2023	Essendon	51 (0)
2024–	Port Adelaide	43 (0)
Total		94 (0)
- ^{1} Playing statistics correct to the end of round 22, 2026.

Brandon Steven Zerk-Thatcher (born 25 August 1998) is an Australian rules footballer who plays for the Port Adelaide Football Club in the Australian Football League (AFL), having initially been drafted to Essendon.

== Early life ==
Zerk-Thatcher was educated at Murray Bridge High School. At the age of 18 he started playing for Sturt Football Club and competed in the NAB AFL Under 18 Championships for South Australia.

== AFL career ==
Zerk-Thatcher was selected with pick 66 in the 2017 national draft. He made his senior debut against Fremantle in round 22 of the 2019 season.

Zerk-Thatcher was traded to Port Adelaide at the end of the 2023 AFL season.

== Statistics ==
Updated to the end of round 22, 2026.

Legend
G	Goals	K	Kicks	D	Disposals	T	Tackles
B	Behinds	H	Handballs	M	Marks

Season	Team	No.	Games	Totals							Averages (per game)							Votes
Season	Team	No.	Games	G	B	K	H	D	M	T	G	B	K	H	D	M	T	Votes
2018	Essendon	30	0	—	—	—	—	—	—	—	—	—	—	—	—	—	—	0
2019	Essendon	30	1	0	0	10	1	11	6	3	0.0	0.0	10.0	1.0	11.0	6.0	3.0	0
2020 (Note: The 2020 season was played with 17 home-and-away matches per team (down from 22) and 16-minute quarters with time on (down from 20-minute quarters with time on) due to the impact of the COVID-19 pandemic.)	Essendon	30	10	0	2	46	36	82	30	8	0.0	0.2	4.6	3.6	8.2	3.0	0.8	0
2021	Essendon	30	6	0	0	36	24	60	22	11	0.0	0.0	6.0	4.0	10.0	3.7	1.8	0
2022	Essendon	30	12	0	0	100	52	152	70	12	0.0	0.0	8.3	4.3	12.7	5.8	1.0	0
2023	Essendon	30	22	0	0	164	103	267	120	33	0.0	0.0	7.5	4.7	12.1	5.5	1.5	0
2024	Port Adelaide	25	26	0	0	192	93	285	136	38	0.0	0.0	7.4	3.6	11.0	5.2	1.5	0
2025	Port Adelaide	25	13	0	0	91	52	143	62	21	0.0	0.0	7.0	4.0	11.0	4.8	1.6	0
2026	Port Adelaide	25	4	0	0	16	13	29	17	3	0.0	0.0	4.0	3.3	7.3	4.3	0.8	0
Career			94	0	2	655	374	1029	463	129	0.0	0.0	7.0	4.0	10.9	4.9	1.4	0
