= Tom Edwards (Australian footballer) =

Australian rules footballer (born 2000)

Personal information
- Full name: Thomas Edwards
- Born: 20 May 2000 (age 26)
- Original team: Swan Districts (WAFL)
- Debut: Round 2, 2025, Essendon vs. Adelaide, at MCG
- Height: 191 cm (6 ft 3 in)

Playing career
Years	Club	Games (Goals)
2025–2026	Essendon	9 (11)

Thomas Edwards (born 20 May 2000) is a former professional Australian rules footballer who played for the Essendon Football Club in the Australian Football League (AFL).

== Early life ==
A lifelong Essendon supporter, Edwards was invited to trial with Essendon in the 2025 pre-season, in the hopes of gaining a contract for the 2025 AFL season through the supplemental selection period (SSP). Days out from the SSP deadline, Edwards played for Essendon in a pre-season match simulation, kicking four goals against the Western Bulldogs. Three days later, he was officially signed by the club. Edwards was told of his signing during recess while teaching at Lesmurdie Senior High School.

== AFL career ==
Edwards made his AFL debut in round 2 of the 2025 season at the Melbourne Cricket Ground, kicking three goals in a 61-point loss to Adelaide. Edwards only managed one more game, the next week, before rupturing his ACL at training in the lead up to round 4, ruling him out for the rest of the season. Following the devastating blow, Essendon moved quickly to re-contract him for the following season.

Edwards made a return to play AFL matches in the 2026 season, however he was delisted at the season's conclusion.

== Statistics ==
Updated to the end of 2026.

Legend
G	Goals	K	Kicks	D	Disposals	T	Tackles
B	Behinds	H	Handballs	M	Marks

Season	Team	No.	Games	Totals							Averages (per game)							Votes
Season	Team	No.	Games	G	B	K	H	D	M	T	G	B	K	H	D	M	T	Votes
2025	Essendon	45	2	3	2	10	4	14	4	4	1.5	1.0	5.0	2.0	7.0	2.0	2.0	0
2026	Essendon	45	7	8	3	41	23	64	19	13	1.1	0.4	5.9	3.3	9.1	2.7	1.9	0
Career			9	11	5	51	27	78	23	17	1.2	0.6	5.7	3.0	8.7	2.6	1.9	0
