= Rhys Unwin =

Australian rules footballer (born 2006)

- Unwin in April 2025

Personal information
- Born: 11 October 2006 (age 20)
- Original team: Greater Western Victoria Rebels (Talent League)
- Draft: No. 61, 2024 national draft
- Debut: Round 23, 2025, Essendon vs. St Kilda, at Docklands Stadium
- Height: 179 cm (5 ft 10 in)

Club information
- Current club: Essendon
- Number: 38

Playing career^{1}
Years	Club	Games (Goals)
2025–	Essendon	5 (1)
- ^{1} Playing statistics correct to the end of round 22, 2026.

Rhys Unwin (born 11 October 2006) is a professional Australian rules footballer with the Essendon Football Club in the Australian Football League (AFL).

== AFL career ==
Unwin was drafted by Essendon with pick 61 in the 2024 national draft.

Having spent most of his first season playing for Essendon's reserves team in the Victorian Football League (VFL), Unwin was selected to make his AFL debut in round 23. Unwin kicked a goal in his debut match, and made his debut in front of 150 supporters who travelled from his hometown of Cobden, Victoria, initially to see Essendon captain and fellow Cobden local Zach Merrett's 250th match. Merrett missed the match through injury, however they got to support Unwin in his AFL debut.

Unwin didn't play consistent football at the AFL level in his first two seasons, playing only three games in 2025 and four games in 2026. Nonetheless, he was rewarded with a one-year contract extension at the end of the 2026 season.

== Statistics ==
Updated to the end of round 22, 2026.

Legend
G	Goals	K	Kicks	D	Disposals	T	Tackles
B	Behinds	H	Handballs	M	Marks

Season	Team	No.	Games	Totals							Averages (per game)							Votes
Season	Team	No.	Games	G	B	K	H	D	M	T	G	B	K	H	D	M	T	Votes
2025	Essendon	38	3	1	1	15	5	20	7	2	0.3	0.3	5.0	1.7	6.7	2.3	0.7	0
2026	Essendon	38	2	0	0	3	8	11	2	4	0.0	0.0	1.5	4.0	5.5	1.0	2.0	0
Career			5	1	1	18	13	31	9	6	0.2	0.2	3.6	2.6	6.2	1.8	1.2	0
