= Archer Day-Wicks =

Australian rules footballer

Personal information
- Full name: Archer Day-Wicks
- Born: 13 May 2006 (age 20)
- Original team: Bendigo Pioneers (Talent League)
- Draft: No. 6, 2025 rookie draft
- Debut: Round 9, 2025, Essendon vs. Sydney, at Docklands Stadium
- Height: 186 cm (6 ft 1 in)

Club information
- Current club: Essendon
- Number: 44

Playing career^{1}
Years	Club	Games (Goals)
2025–	Essendon	24 (7)
- ^{1} Playing statistics correct to the end of round 22, 2026.

Archer Day-Wicks (born 13 May 2006) is a professional Australian rules footballer with the Essendon Football Club in the Australian Football League (AFL).

== AFL career ==
Day-Wicks was drafted by Essendon in the 2024 rookie draft.

Having impressed early in his first season while playing for the Bombers' reserves team in the Victorian Football League (VFL), Day-Wicks was named for his senior debut in round 9 of the 2025 AFL season, alongside fellow debutant, Lewis Hayes. Day-Wicks kicked a goal with his first kick, joining the often discussed "exclusive" club of players to achieve this feat.

== Statistics ==
Updated to the end of round 22, 2026.

Legend
G	Goals	K	Kicks	D	Disposals	T	Tackles
B	Behinds	H	Handballs	M	Marks

Season	Team	No.	Games	Totals							Averages (per game)							Votes
Season	Team	No.	Games	G	B	K	H	D	M	T	G	B	K	H	D	M	T	Votes
2025	Essendon	44	5	1	1	15	28	43	8	9	0.2	0.2	3.0	5.6	8.6	1.6	1.8	0
2026	Essendon	44	19	6	9	97	112	209	48	63	0.3	0.5	5.1	5.9	11.0	2.5	3.3	0
Career			24	7	10	112	140	252	56	72	0.3	0.4	4.7	5.8	10.5	2.3	3.0	0
