= Will Hayes (footballer, born 2006) =

William Hayes

Personal information
- Full name: William Hayes
- Born: 16 May 2006 (age 20); Western Australia
- Original team: Claremont (WAFL)
- Draft: No. 56, 2024 national draft
- Debut: Round 11, 2025, Collingwood vs. North Melbourne, at Marvel Stadium
- Height: 180 cm (5 ft 11 in)
- Weight: 80 kg (176 lb)
- Position: Small forward

Club information
- Current club: Collingwood
- Number: 39

Playing career^{1}
Years	Club	Games (Goals)
2025–	Collingwood	12 (8)
- ^{1} Playing statistics correct to the end of the 2026 season.

William Hayes (born 16 May 2006) is an Australian rules footballer playing for the Collingwood Football Club in the Australian Football League (AFL).

== State football ==
Hayes played junior football for Subiaco, before joining West Australian Football League (WAFL) club Claremont. He played four matches for Claremont's Futures side in 2022 before advancing to the Colts side in 2023. In his first season, he played 10 matches, averaging 12 disposals and kicked nine goals. In 2024, Hayes played another 10 matches for Claremont's Colts, averaging 14.4 disposals and kicked two goals.

Hayes also represented Western Australia at under-18 level, playing four matches and averaging 13 disposals per game.

== AFL career ==
Hayes was drafted by Australian Football League (AFL) club Collingwood with their third pick of the 2024 national draft, which was the 56th pick overall. He impressed at VFL level across seven games, averaging 10 disposals and a goal per game, leading to him making his AFL debut against North Melbourne in round 11 of the 2025 AFL season. Hayes played two AFL games in the 2025 season while having an influential VFL season which he finished with 10 goals kicked in 15 games. In October 2025, he extended his contract by two years until the end of 2028.

== Playing style ==
Hayes is considered an intelligent footballer utilising running patterns and smart ball use, while also having endurance. He is capable of both receiving the ball and rebounding from defence as well as finding forward targets. At the 2024 AFL Draft Combine, he placed third in the agility test and fourth in the 2km time trial.

== Statistics ==
Updated to the end of round 22, 2026.

Legend
G	Goals	K	Kicks	D	Disposals	T	Tackles
B	Behinds	H	Handballs	M	Marks

Season	Team	No.	Games	Totals							Averages (per game)							Votes
Season	Team	No.	Games	G	B	K	H	D	M	T	G	B	K	H	D	M	T	Votes
2025	Collingwood	39	2	1	0	13	3	16	6	6	0.5	0.0	6.5	1.5	8.0	3.0	3.0	0
2026	Collingwood	39	7	6	3	25	22	47	13	9	0.9	0.4	3.6	3.1	6.7	1.9	1.3	
Career			9	7	3	38	25	63	19	15	0.8	0.3	4.2	2.8	7.0	2.1	1.7	0
