= Hamish Davis =

Australian rules footballer (born 2006)

Personal information
- Born: 2 May 2006 (age 20)
- Original team: Subiaco JFC
- Draft: No. 65, 2024 national draft
- Height: 190 cm (6 ft 3 in)
- Weight: 85 kg (187 lb)
- Position: Winger/Forward

Club information
- Current club: West Coast Eagles
- Number: 38

Playing career
Years	Club	Games (Goals)
2025–	West Coast Eagles	29 (3)

Hamish Davis (born 2 May 2006) is an Australian rules footballer who plays for the West Coast Eagles in the Australian Football League (AFL).

== Early years ==
Davis played his early football for the Hale School 1st XVIII and with the Subiaco JFC.

A medium-sized forward and winger, Davis represented the Western Australia under-18s at the 2024 AFL National Championships and won the Mel Whinnen Medal playing for the Claremont colts in their 2024 grand final win, amassing 30 disposals. He also got senior football experience during the 2024 WAFL season and kicked four goals in Claremont's elimination final win over East Fremantle .

== AFL career ==
Davis was selected by the Eagles with the 65th pick of the 2024 national draft. He featured eight times during his debut AFL season in 2025 and signed a contract extension through to the end of 2027. In the 2026 AFL season, Davis was a regular fixture, making 21 appearances primarily off the wing.
