= Tobie Travaglia =

Australian rules footballer (born 2006)

Personal information
- Full name: Tobie Travaglia
- Nickname: Tootsie
- Born: 26 October 2006 (age 20)
- Original teams: Sandhurst (BFNL); Bendigo Pioneers (Talent League)
- Draft: Pick 8, 2024 national draft
- Debut: 29 March 2025, St Kilda vs. Richmond, at Marvel Stadium
- Height: 188 cm (6 ft 2 in)
- Position: Defender

Club information
- Current club: St Kilda
- Number: 5

Playing career^{1}
Years	Club	Games (Goals)
2025–	St Kilda	17 (2)
- ^{1} Playing statistics correct to the end of round 22, 2026.

Tobie Travaglia (born 26 October 2006) is an Australian rules footballer who plays for the St Kilda Football Club in the Australian Football League (AFL).

== Early life ==
Travaglia played for the Bendigo Pioneers in the Talent League. He made the Talent League Team of the Year in 2024.

== AFL career ==
Travaglia was selected with St Kilda's first pick, the 8th overall, in the 2024 national draft. He made his debut in Round 3 of the 2025 AFL season against Richmond, collecting 18 disposals in an 82-point win. He kicked his first goal the following week against Port Adelaide in a 17-point win at Adelaide Oval.

== Statistics ==
Updated to the end of round 22, 2026.

Legend
G	Goals	K	Kicks	D	Disposals	T	Tackles
B	Behinds	H	Handballs	M	Marks

Season	Team	No.	Games	Totals							Averages (per game)							Votes
Season	Team	No.	Games	G	B	K	H	D	M	T	G	B	K	H	D	M	T	Votes
2025	St Kilda	5	12	2	1	59	52	111	31	26	0.2	0.1	4.9	4.3	9.3	2.6	2.2	0
2026	St Kilda	5	5	0	0	25	37	62	15	8	0.0	0.0	5.0	7.4	12.4	3.0	1.6	0
Career			17	2	1	84	89	173	46	34	0.1	0.1	4.9	5.2	10.2	2.7	2.0	0
