= Angus Clarke =

Australian rules footballer

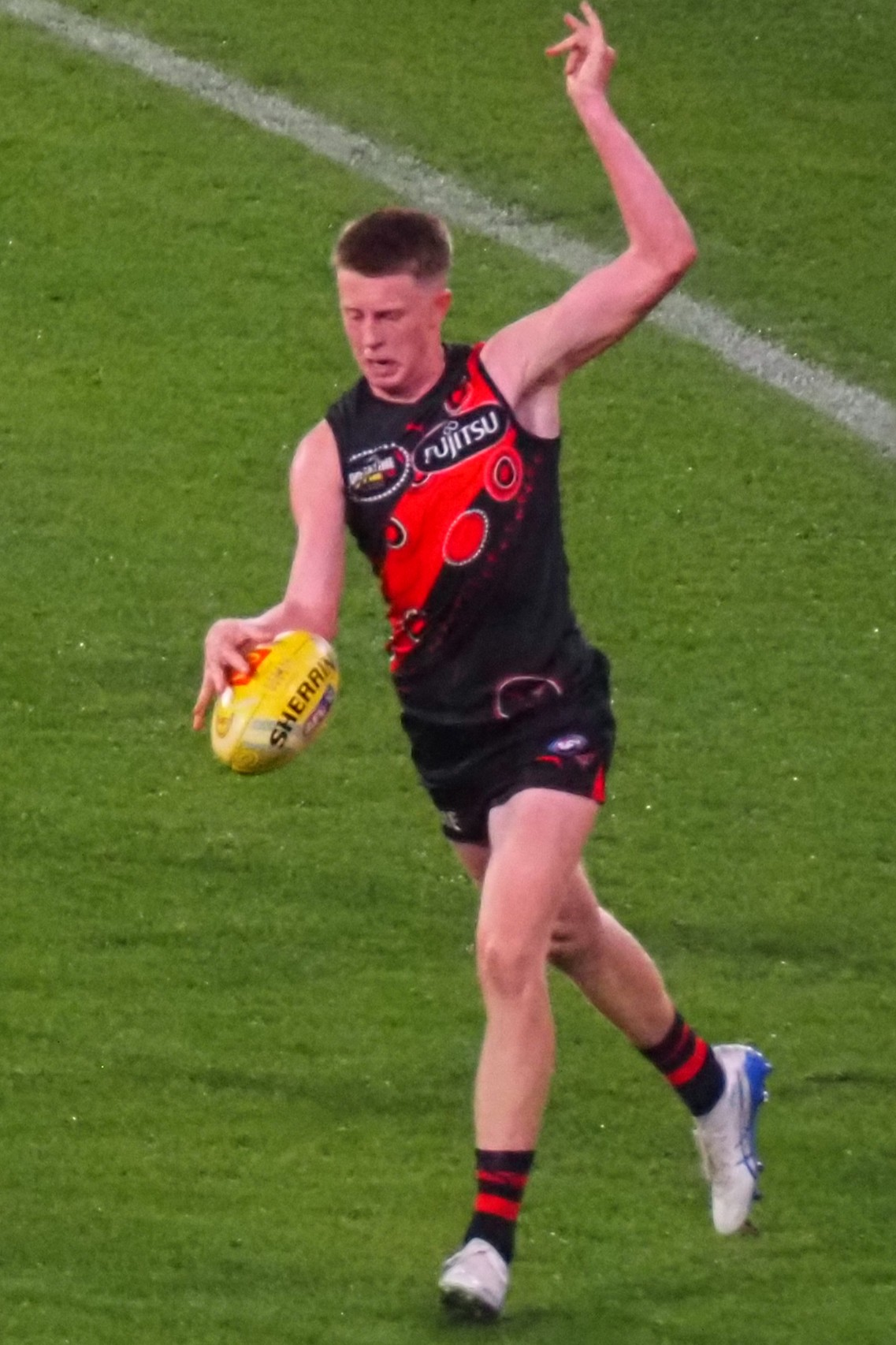
- Clarke playing for Essendon in 2025

Personal information
- Full name: Angus Clarke
- Born: 2 November 2006 (age 20); Tantanoola, South Australia
- Original team: Glenelg (SANFL)
- Draft: No. 39, 2024 national draft
- Debut: Round 11, 2025, Essendon vs. Richmond, at Melbourne Cricket Ground
- Height: 189 cm (6 ft 2 in)

Club information
- Current club: Essendon
- Number: 36

Playing career^{1}
Years	Club	Games (Goals)
2025–	Essendon	18 (6)
- ^{1} Playing statistics correct to the end of round 22, 2026.

Career highlights
- AFL Rising Star nominee: 2025

Angus Clarke (born 2 November 2006) is a professional Australian rules footballer with the Essendon Football Club in the Australian Football League (AFL).

== AFL career ==
Clarke was drafted by Essendon with pick 39 in the 2024 national draft.

Early in his first season at the club, Clarke broke his collarbone while playing for Essendon's reserves team in the Victorian Football League (VFL). This injury sidelined him for a month, making his return at the end of April. After a couple of games back in the VFL, Clarke was named for his AFL debut in Round 11, debuting against Richmond for the annual Dreamtime at the 'G match. Clarke kicked 3 goals in the first half, finishing with those 3 goals and 16 disposals, to be awarded the Rising Star nomination for round 11 in his first match.

== Statistics ==
Updated to the end of round 22, 2026.

Legend
G	Goals	K	Kicks	D	Disposals	T	Tackles
B	Behinds	H	Handballs	M	Marks

Season	Team	No.	Games	Totals							Averages (per game)							Votes
Season	Team	No.	Games	G	B	K	H	D	M	T	G	B	K	H	D	M	T	Votes
2025	Essendon	36	14	5	5	135	76	211	71	20	0.4	0.4	9.6	5.4	15.1	5.1	1.4	0
2026	Essendon	36	4	1	0	26	14	40	18	9	0.3	0.0	6.5	3.5	10.0	4.5	2.3	0
Career			18	6	5	161	90	251	89	29	0.3	0.3	8.9	5.0	13.9	4.9	1.6	0
