= Lucca Grego =

Australian rules footballer (born 2006)

Personal information
- Born: 15 August 2006 (age 20)
- Original team: Bacchus Marsh/Keilor
- Draft: No. 48, 2024 national draft
- Height: 184 cm (6 ft 0 in)
- Weight: 77 kg (170 lb)
- Position: Defender/Midfielder

Club information
- Current club: West Coast Eagles
- Number: 31

Playing career
Years	Club	Games (Goals)
2025–	West Coast Eagles	1 (0)

Lucca Grego (born 15 August 2006) is an Australian rules footballer who plays for the West Coast Eagles in the Australian Football League (AFL).

Grego spent his early years in Brisbane, where he was a rugby league footballer from the age of four. After moving with his family to Melbourne, Grego continued playing rugby league for the Altona Roosters, and represented Victoria's under-12s state team at the national championships. His father, James, worked in a development role with the Melbourne Storm. He was educated at Altona Primary School and Maribyrnong College in Melbourne.

A midfielder and half back, Grego got his grounding in Australian rules football with Bacchus Marsh, playing alongside future top draft pick Sam Lalor, and later featured briefly for Keilor. He co-captained the Western Jets in the 2024 Talent League, averaging over 20 disposals as a midfielder, and was utilised in defence for Vic Metro. In the 2024 national draft, Grego was selected by the Eagles at pick 48.

Grego featured regularly for the Eagles in the 2025 WAFL season, putting together 17 appearances before earning an AFL call-up for the final fixture of the home and away season, against the Sydney Swans at Perth Stadium. He was limited to the WAFL during the 2026 season and is contracted by the club until the end of 2027.
