= Liam Henry =

Australian rules footballer (born 2001)

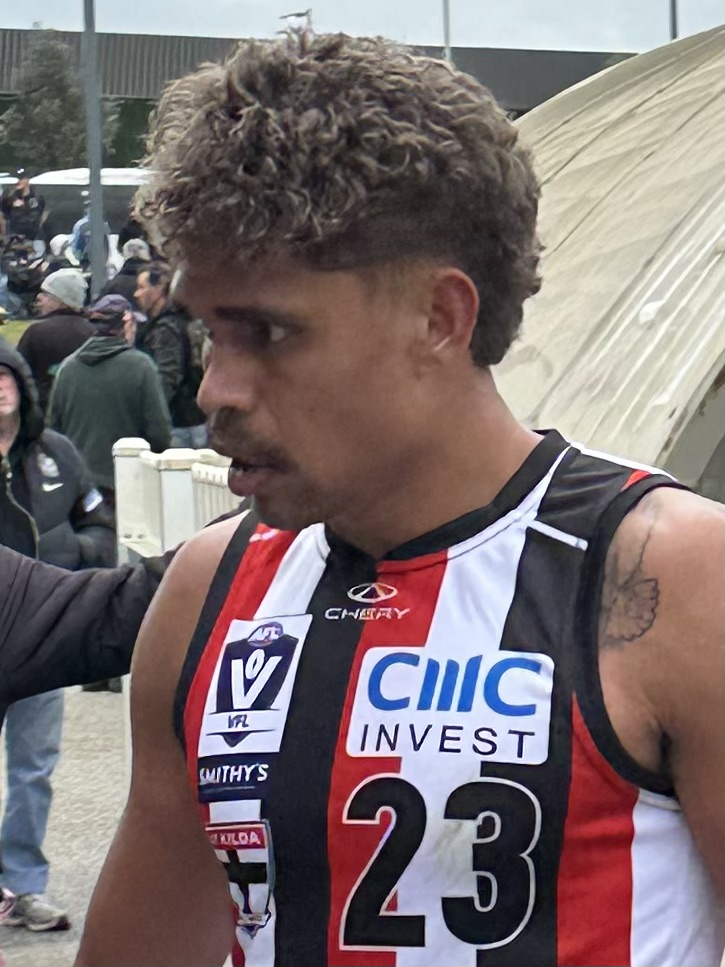
- Henry in July 2026

Personal information
- Full name: Liam Henry
- Born: 28 August 2001 (age 25); Tammin, Western Australia
- Original team: Claremont (WAFL)/Christ Church Grammar School (PSA)
- Draft: No. 9, 2019 national draft
- Height: 180 cm (5 ft 11 in)
- Weight: 83 kg (183 lb)
- Position: Wingman

Club information
- Current club: St Kilda
- Number: 23

Playing career^{1}
Years	Club	Games (Goals)
2020–2023	Fremantle	43 (13)
2024–	St Kilda	26 (16)
Total		69 (29)
- ^{1} Playing statistics correct to the end of round 22, 2026.

Liam Henry (born 28 August 2001) is an Australian rules footballer who plays for the St Kilda Football Club in the Australian Football League (AFL). He previously played for the Fremantle Football Club.

== Early life ==
Born in Tammin, 180 km east of Perth, Henry also lived in Port Lincoln, South Australia and Fitzroy Crossing in the Kimberley region of Western Australia, before returning to Tammin to attend primary school. Henry then boarded at Christ Church Grammar School, where he started a business with two classmates selling neckties with Indigenous patterns. One of his partners, Isaiah Butters was also later drafted by Fremantle. Henry's father is a member of the Wajuk people of the South West region of Western Australia, whilst his mother is Walmadjari from the Kimberley.

== AFL career ==
=== Fremantle (2020–2023) ===
As a member of Fremantle's Next Generation Academy, Henry was drafted from the Claremont Football Club with the 9th selection in the 2019 national draft, when Fremantle matched Carlton's bid. When the 2020 AFL season was postponed due to the COVID-19 pandemic, Henry returned to his parents' home in Derby, Western Australia. He was selected to make his AFL debut for Fremantle in round 13 of the 2020 AFL season in the Sir Douglas Nicholls Indigenous Round against Sydney.

After starting his career as a forward, Henry made the transition to the wing during 2022. In Round 13 of the 2023 AFL season Henry made a big impact and stood up after being in and out of the senior team. He collected 32 disposals, both a career and equal game high, and was a major contributor to a 32 point win at home against Essendon. Henry continued this form into the next round against the Western Bulldogs collecting a career-high 33 disposals, beating his record of 32 set the week prior.

=== St Kilda (2024–present) ===
Following the 2023 season, Henry requested a trade and was traded to St Kilda on 16 October 2023.

== Statistics ==
Updated to the end of round 22, 2026.

Legend
G	Goals	K	Kicks	D	Disposals	T	Tackles
B	Behinds	H	Handballs	M	Marks

Season	Team	No.	Games	Totals							Averages (per game)							Votes
Season	Team	No.	Games	G	B	K	H	D	M	T	G	B	K	H	D	M	T	Votes
2020 (Note: The 2020 season was played with 17 home-and-away matches per team (down from 22) and 16-minute quarters with time on (down from 20-minute quarters with time on) due to the impact of the COVID-19 pandemic.)	Fremantle	31	3	1	3	16	6	22	8	4	0.3	1.0	5.3	2.0	7.3	2.7	1.3	0
2021	Fremantle	23	17	10	9	106	47	153	37	18	0.6	0.5	6.2	2.8	9.0	2.2	1.1	0
2022 (Note: Statistics include one game when Henry was the used Substitute (round 21) and one game when Henry was not used as the Substitute (round 17).)	Fremantle	23	7	1	1	36	29	65	19	10	0.1	0.1	5.1	4.1	9.3	2.7	1.4	0
2023	Fremantle	23	16	1	5	196	131	327	79	42	0.1	0.3	12.3	8.2	20.4	4.9	2.6	3
2024	St Kilda	23	12	7	7	97	69	166	33	32	0.6	0.6	8.1	5.8	13.8	2.8	2.7	0
2025	St Kilda	23	6	2	1	24	20	44	11	5	0.3	0.2	4.0	3.3	7.3	1.8	0.8	0
2026	St Kilda	23	8	7	5	48	34	82	23	16	0.9	0.6	6.0	4.3	10.3	2.9	2.0	0
Career			69	29	31	523	336	859	210	127	0.4	0.4	7.6	4.9	12.4	3.0	1.8	3
