= Francis Evans (footballer) =

Australian rules footballer (born 2001)

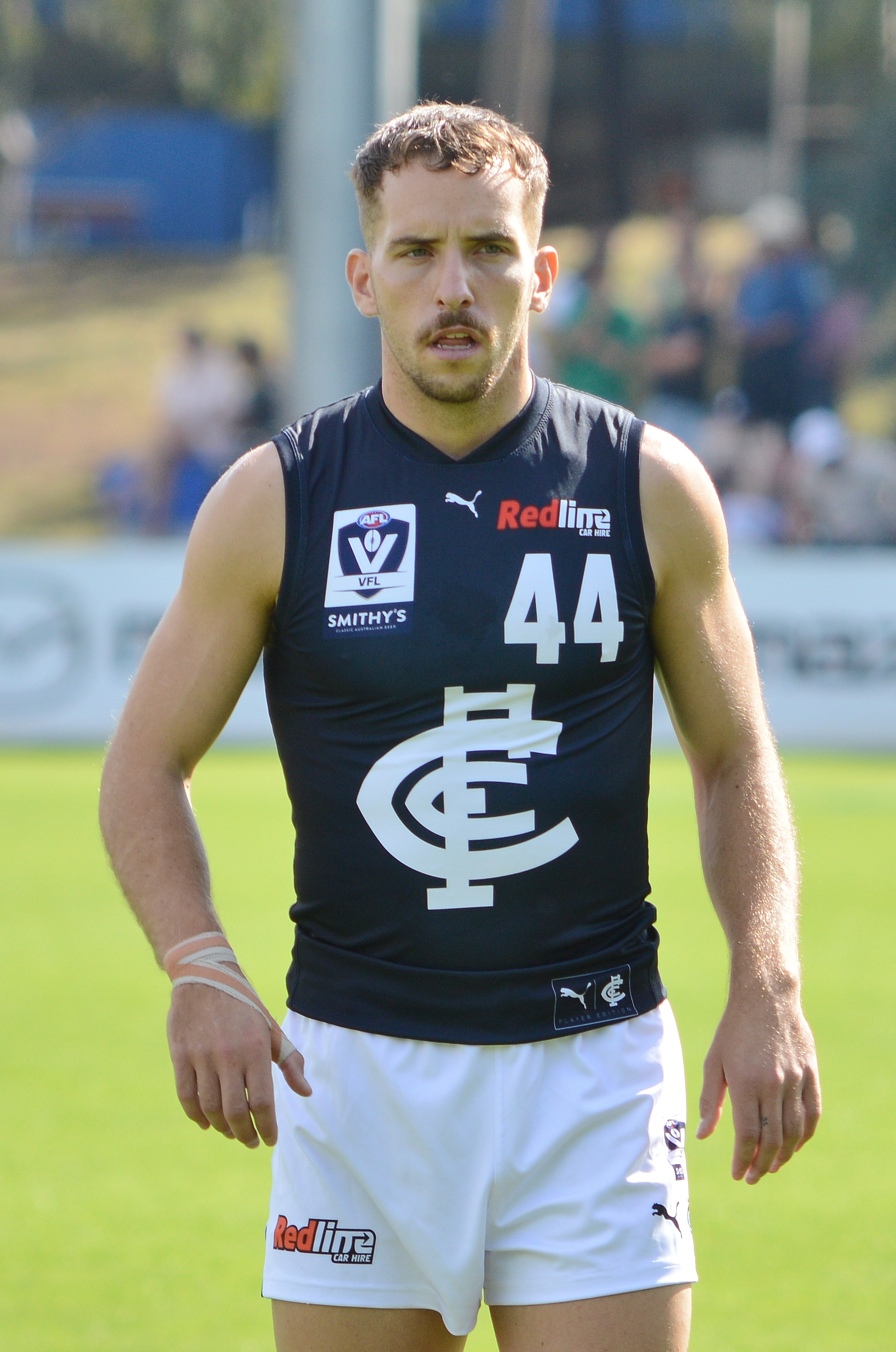
- Evans with Carlton's VFL side in April 2025

Personal information
- Full name: Francis Evans
- Nickname: Frank the Tank
- Born: 23 August 2001 (age 25); Melbourne, Victoria
- Original teams: Calder Cannons (NAB League); Brunswick NOBS (VAFA)
- Draft: No. 41, 2019 AFL draft
- Debut: Round 2, 2021, Geelong vs. Brisbane Lions, at Kardinia Park
- Height: 182 cm (6 ft 0 in)
- Weight: 78 kg (172 lb)
- Position: Forward

Club information
- Current club: Carlton
- Number: 44

Playing career^{1}
Years	Club	Games (Goals)
2020–2022	Geelong	7 (3)
2023–2024	Port Adelaide	27 (19)
2025–	Carlton	33 (37)
Total		67 (59)
- ^{1} Playing statistics correct to the end of the 2026 season.

Francis Evans (born 23 August 2001) is an Australian rules footballer who plays for the Carlton Football Club in the Australian Football League (AFL). Drafted in 2019 by Geelong, Evans also played for Port Adelaide between 2023 and 2024.

== Early life ==
Evans did not come through the traditional talent pathway to the AFL, spending most of his junior career playing for Brunswick NOBS in the VAFA. He only played two matches for the NAB League's Calder Cannons; thus Evans' selection as an 18-year-old with pick 41 by the Geelong Football Club in the 2019 AFL draft was a surprise to most draft gurus.

== AFL career ==
=== Geelong ===
Evans made his AFL debut in round 2, 2021 against Brisbane Lions at GMHBA Stadium. He spent three years on the Geelong list, playing seven senior games, before being delisted after its premiership year.

=== Port Adelaide ===
Evans signed for the Port Adelaide Football Club as a delisted free agent, and played 26 games for the club over the next two years, including 17 games as a regular player in 2024. He was delisted by Port Adelaide at the end of the 2024 season.

=== Carlton ===
Evans signed to play for the Carlton reserves for the 2025 season, but after impressing in pre-season training was added to the club's rookie list during the supplemental signing period. Evans earned a round one debut for the club, starting his 2025 season against Richmond, in which he scored his first goal for the club.

In the round 19 clash against Melbourne, Evans was knocked out by demons defender Steven May, who was suspended for 3 weeks. He returned in round 21, and played every game for the rest of the year, and kicked 11 goals in those 4 games, including 4 against Gold Coast in round 22, and 3 against Essendon in round 24.

In October 2025 Evans signed a one-year contract extension with Carlton to the end of 2026. The next year, in July 2026, Evans signed a further two-year contract extension with Carlton to the end of 2028.

== Statistics ==
Updated to the end of the 2026 season.

Legend
G	Goals	K	Kicks	D	Disposals	T	Tackles
B	Behinds	H	Handballs	M	Marks

Season	Team	No.	Games	Totals							Averages (per game)							Votes
Season	Team	No.	Games	G	B	K	H	D	M	T	G	B	K	H	D	M	T	Votes
2020 (Note: The 2020 season was played with 17 home-and-away matches per team (down from 22) and 16-minute quarters with time on (down from 20-minute quarters with time on) due to the impact of the COVID-19 pandemic.)	Geelong	31	0	—	—	—	—	—	—	—	—	—	—	—	—	—	—	0
2021	Geelong	31	2	2	1	8	0	8	4	1	1.0	0.5	4.0	0.0	4.0	2.0	0.5	0
2022	Geelong	31	5	1	0	14	24	38	8	7	0.2	0.0	2.8	4.8	7.6	1.6	1.4	0
2023	Port Adelaide	31	10	10	4	51	24	75	20	16	1.0	0.4	5.1	2.4	7.5	2.0	1.6	0
2024	Port Adelaide	31	17	9	7	86	44	130	35	41	0.5	0.4	5.1	2.6	7.6	2.1	2.4	0
2025	Carlton	44	10	13	6	72	42	114	31	31	1.3	0.6	7.2	4.2	11.4	3.1	3.1	0
2026	Carlton	44	23	24	15	190	122	312	66	85	1.0	0.7	8.3	5.3	13.6	2.9	3.7	0
Career			67	59	33	421	256	677	164	181	0.9	0.5	6.3	3.8	10.1	2.4	2.7	0
