= Luke Beecken =

Personal information
- Born: 18 April 2001 (age 25)
- Original team: SMOSH West Lakes JFC/Woodville-West Torrens
- Draft: No. 17, 2024 mid-season rookie draft
- Debut: Round 23, 2025, Brisbane Lions vs. Fremantle, at Perth Stadium
- Height: 185 cm (6 ft 1 in)
- Position: Midfielder

Club information
- Current club: Brisbane Lions
- Number: 17

Playing career^{1}
Years	Club	Games (Goals)
2024–	Brisbane Lions	1 (0)
- ^{1} Playing statistics correct to the end of the 2025 season.

Career highlights
- SANFL premiership player: 2021

Luke Beecken (born 18 April 2001) is an Australian rules footballer who plays for the Brisbane Lions in the Australian Football League (AFL).

== Pre-AFL career ==
Beecken played for Woodville-West Torrens in the SANFL under 18s in 2019.

He continued to play for Woodville-West Torrens in the senior team beyond 2019, and was part of their 2021 Premiership side.

== AFL career ==
Beecken was selected by the Brisbane Lions with pick 17 of the 2024 mid-season rookie draft. In October of 2024, he signed a one-year contract extension to the end of 2025.

Beecken made his debut in round 23 of the 2025 AFL season, starting the game as the substitute. At the end of the 2025 season, Beecken signed a contract extension to the end of 2026.

== Statistics ==
Updated to the end of the 2025 season.

Legend
G	Goals	K	Kicks	D	Disposals	T	Tackles
B	Behinds	H	Handballs	M	Marks

Season	Team	No.	Games	Totals							Averages (per game)							Votes
Season	Team	No.	Games	G	B	K	H	D	M	T	G	B	K	H	D	M	T	Votes
2024	Brisbane Lions	47	0	—	—	—	—	—	—	—	—	—	—	—	—	—	—	0
2025	Brisbane Lions	17	1	0	0	1	2	3	1	0	0.0	0.0	1.0	2.0	3.0	1.0	0.0	0
Career			1	0	0	1	2	3	1	0	0.0	0.0	1.0	2.0	3.0	1.0	0.0	0
