= Will McLachlan =

Australian rules footballer (born 2006)

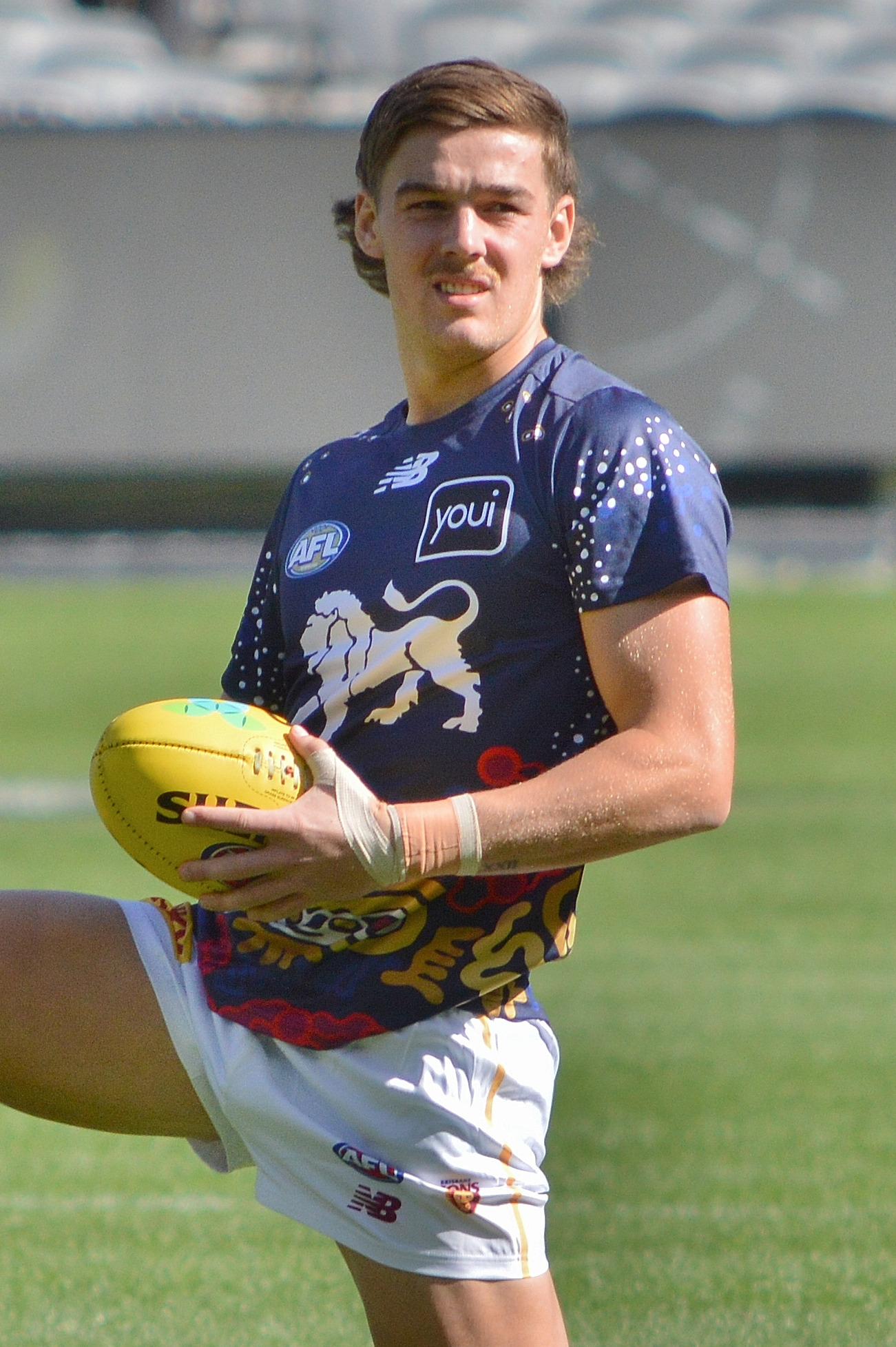
- McLachlan in April 2025

Personal information
- Born: 13 April 2005 (age 21)
- Original team: Geelong Falcons (Talent League)
- Draft: No. 6, 2024 mid-season draft
- Debut: Round 2, 2025, Brisbane Lions vs. West Coast, at The Gabba
- Height: 185 cm (6 ft 1 in)
- Position: Forward

Club information
- Current club: Melbourne

Playing career^{1}
Years	Club	Games (Goals)
2024–2026	Brisbane Lions	7 (4)
2027–	Melbourne	0 (0)
- ^{1} Playing statistics correct to the end of 2026.

Will McLachlan (born 13 April 2005) is an Australian rules footballer who plays for the Melbourne Football Club in the Australian Football League (AFL), having previously played for the Brisbane Lions. He was drafted by Brisbane with the sixth overall pick in the 2024 mid-season draft. McLachlan made his debut in round 2, 2025.

In October 2026, after playing only seven games for the Brisbane Lions, McLachlan was traded to the Melbourne Football Club.

== Statistics ==
Updated to the end of round 22, 2026.

Legend
G	Goals	K	Kicks	D	Disposals	T	Tackles
B	Behinds	H	Handballs	M	Marks

Season	Team	No.	Games	Totals							Averages (per game)							Votes
Season	Team	No.	Games	G	B	K	H	D	M	T	G	B	K	H	D	M	T	Votes
2024	Brisbane Lions	42	0	—	—	—	—	—	—	—	—	—	—	—	—	—	—	0
2025	Brisbane Lions	28	6	3	2	18	9	27	10	4	0.5	0.3	3.0	1.5	4.5	1.7	0.7	0
2026	Brisbane Lions	28	1	1	0	2	2	4	1	2	1.0	0.0	2.0	2.0	4.0	1.0	2.0	0
Career			7	4	2	20	11	31	11	6	0.6	0.3	2.9	1.6	4.4	1.6	0.9	0
