= Campbell Gray (footballer) =

Australian rules footballer (born 2003)

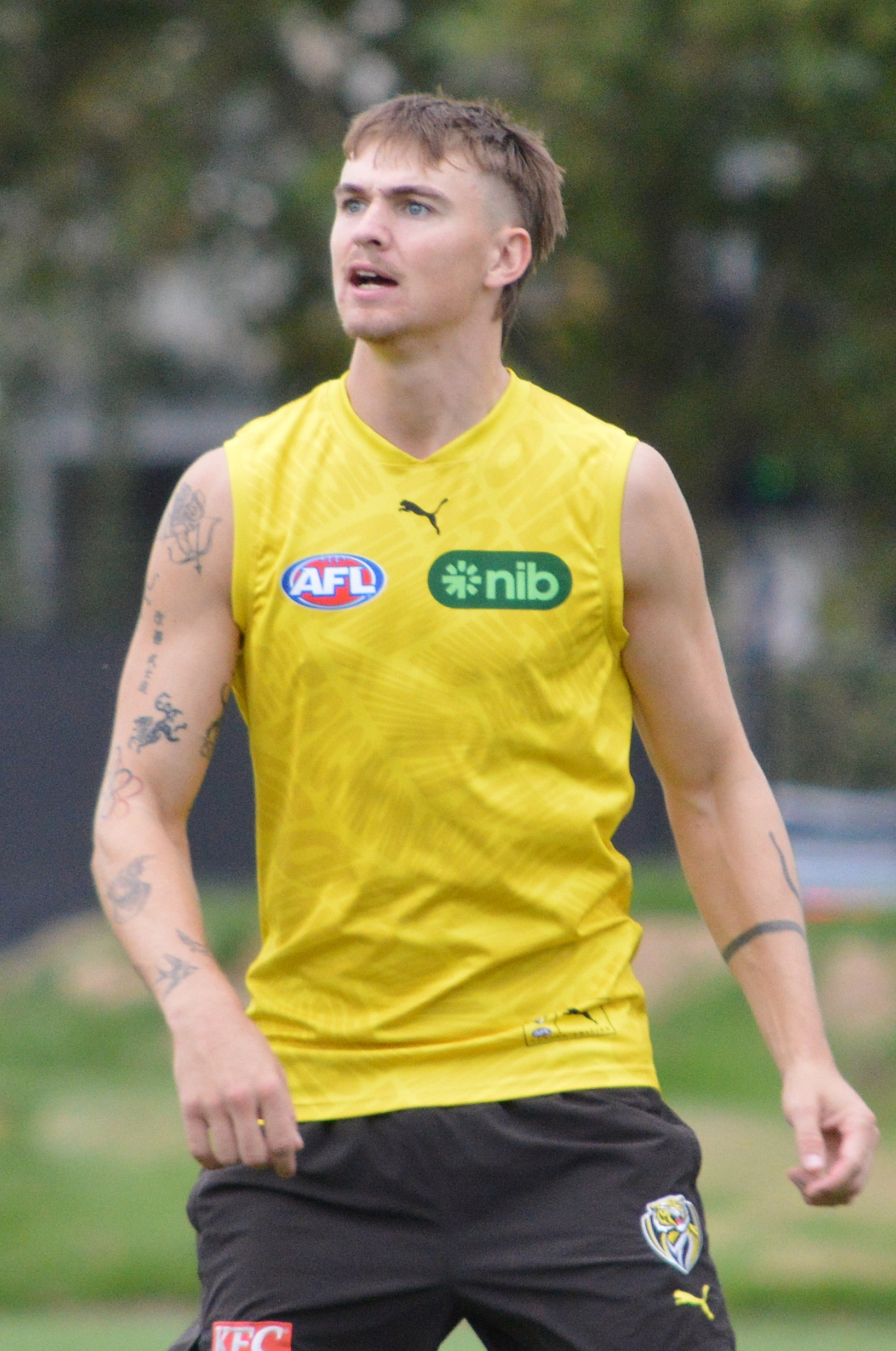
- Gray in March 2026

Personal information
- Born: 1 August 2003 (age 23)
- Original teams: Essendon (VFL); Keilor (EDFL)
- Draft: No. 16, 2024 mid-season draft
- Debut: Round 7, 2025, Richmond vs. Melbourne, at MCG
- Height: 195 cm (6 ft 5 in)
- Position: Key defender

Club information
- Current club: Richmond
- Number: 50

Playing career^{1}
Years	Club	Games (Goals)
2024–	Richmond	13 (1)
- ^{1} Playing statistics correct to the end of 2026.

Campbell Gray (born 1 August 2003) is an Australian rules footballer who plays for the Richmond Football Club in the Australian Football League (AFL). A key position defender, he was selected in the 2024 mid-season draft and made his debut the following year, in round 7 of the 2025 season.

== Early life and state-league football ==
Gray played senior football at Keilor in the Essendon District Football League (EDFL), winning a premiership with the club's senior team in 2023 before joining Essendon's Victorian Football League (VFL) team in 2024.

== AFL career ==
Gray was drafted by Richmond with the 16th selection in the 2024 mid-season draft.

He spent the remainder of that season with the club's reserves side in VFL, playing mostly as a forward and suffering a hamstring injury which ended his season prematurely.

Gray made his AFL debut in round 7 of the 2025 season, in the Anzac Day eve match against Melbourne at the MCG.

== Statistics ==
Updated to the end of round 22, 2026.

Legend
G	Goals	K	Kicks	D	Disposals	T	Tackles
B	Behinds	H	Handballs	M	Marks

Season	Team	No.	Games	Totals							Averages (per game)							Votes
Season	Team	No.	Games	G	B	K	H	D	M	T	G	B	K	H	D	M	T	Votes
2024		50	0	—	—	—	—	—	—	—	—	—	—	—	—	—	—	0
2025	Richmond	50	3	0	0	20	9	29	16	2	0.0	0.0	6.7	3.0	9.7	5.3	0.7	0
2026	Richmond	50	9	1	0	38	21	59	25	16	0.1	0.0	4.2	2.3	6.6	2.8	1.8	0
Career			12	1	0	58	30	88	41	18	0.1	0.0	4.8	2.5	7.3	3.4	1.5	0
