= Sandy Brock =

Personal information
- Born: 14 December 2002 (age 23)
- Original team: Palmerston/Peel Thunder
- Draft: No. 36, 2022 rookie draft 2025 pre-season supplemental selection period
- Debut: Round 4, 2025, West Coast vs. Greater Western Sydney, at Sydney Showground Stadium
- Height: 198 cm (6 ft 6 in)
- Position: Key Defender

Club information
- Current club: West Coast
- Number: 41

Playing career^{1}
Years	Club	Games (Goals)
2022–2024	Gold Coast	0 (0)
2025–	West Coast	20 (0)
- ^{1} Playing statistics correct to the end of round 22, 2026.

Career highlights
- VFL premiership player: 2023

Sandy Brock (born 14 December 2002) is an Australian rules footballer who plays for the West Coast Eagles in the Australian Football League (AFL), having previously been listed with the Gold Coast Suns.

== AFL career ==
Brock was selected with pick 36 of the 2022 rookie draft by the Gold Coast Suns. He was part of the Gold Coast side that won the 2023 VFL Grand Final.

Brock was delisted without playing a game for the Suns at the end of the 2024 AFL season. Following his delisting, Brock trialled with the West Coast Eagles to get back on an AFL list through the 2025 supplemental selection period. He was signed by West Coast in February 2025. He made his debut in round 4 of the 2025 AFL season.

At the end of the 2025 season, Brock signed a two-year contract extension to the end of 2027.

== Personal life ==
Brock is the nephew of Australian motor racing driver Peter Brock.

== Statistics ==
Updated to the end of round 22, 2026.

Legend
G	Goals	K	Kicks	D	Disposals	T	Tackles
B	Behinds	H	Handballs	M	Marks

Season	Team	No.	Games	Totals							Averages (per game)							Votes
Season	Team	No.	Games	G	B	K	H	D	M	T	G	B	K	H	D	M	T	Votes
2022	Gold Coast	45	0	—	—	—	—	—	—	—	—	—	—	—	—	—	—	0
2023	Gold Coast	45	0	—	—	—	—	—	—	—	—	—	—	—	—	—	—	0
2024	Gold Coast	45	0	—	—	—	—	—	—	—	—	—	—	—	—	—	—	0
2025	West Coast	41	14	0	0	95	59	154	59	11	0.0	0.0	6.8	4.2	11.0	4.2	0.8	0
2026	West Coast	41	6	0	0	30	21	51	20	8	0.0	0.0	5.0	3.5	8.5	3.3	1.3	0
Career			20	0	0	125	80	205	79	19	0.0	0.0	6.3	4.0	10.3	4.0	1.0	0
