= Alex Dodson =

Personal information
- Born: 15 June 2006 (age 20)
- Original teams: Payneham Norwood Union Football Club (AdFL); Sturt (SANFL)
- Draft: No. 53, 2024 national draft
- Debut: Round 23, St Kilda vs. Essendon, at Marvel Stadium
- Height: 203 cm (6 ft 8 in)
- Position: Ruck

Club information
- Current club: St Kilda
- Number: 30

Playing career^{1}
Years	Club	Games (Goals)
2025–	St Kilda	1 (0)
- ^{1} Playing statistics correct to the end of the 2026 season.

Alex Dodson (born 15 June 2006) is an Australian rules footballer who plays for the St Kilda Football Club in the Australian Football League (AFL).

== Junior career ==
Dodson played for Sturt in the SANFL under 18s, as well as playing three games for South Australia in the National Championships, where he averaged 17.3 disposals and 19.7 hitouts.

Dodson was also a promising basketball prospect, being offered a development player position with the Adelaide 36ers and receiving attention from US college basketball teams. Ultimately, however, he chose to play AFL.

== AFL career ==
Dodson was selected by St Kilda with pick 53 of the 2024 AFL draft. He made his debut in round 23 of the 2025 AFL season.

== Statistics ==
Updated to the end of the 2026 season.

Legend
G	Goals	K	Kicks	D	Disposals	T	Tackles
B	Behinds	H	Handballs	M	Marks	H/O	Hit-outs

Season	Team	No.	Games	Totals								Averages (per game)								Votes
Season	Team	No.	Games	G	B	K	H	D	M	T	H/O	G	B	K	H	D	M	T	H/O	Votes
2025	St Kilda	30	1	0	1	3	5	8	2	0	2	0.0	1.0	3.0	5.0	8.0	2.0	0.0	2.0	0
2026	St Kilda	30	0	—	—	—	—	—	—	—	—	—	—	—	—	—	—	—	—	0
Career			1	0	1	3	5	8	2	0	2	0.0	1.0	3.0	5.0	8.0	2.0	0.0	2.0	0
