= Cody Angove =

Australian rules footballer

Personal information
- Born: 28 May 2006 (age 20)
- Original team: Claremont (WAFL)
- Draft: No. 24, 2024 AFL draft
- Debut: Round 10, 2025, Greater Western Sydney vs. Geelong, at Kardinia Park
- Height: 182 cm (6 ft 0 in)

Club information
- Current club: Greater Western Sydney
- Number: 29

Playing career^{1}
Years	Club	Games (Goals)
2025–present	Greater Western Sydney	4 (1)
- ^{1} Playing statistics correct to the end of the 2025 season.

Cody Angove (born 28 May 2006) is an Australian rules footballer who plays for the Greater Western Sydney Giants in the Australian Football League.

== Career ==
Angove played for Claremont Football Club in their colts competition, winning back-to-back premierships with the team in 2023 and 2024.

Angove was drafted by the Greater Western Sydney Giants with pick 24 in the 2024 AFL draft. This came as a surprise to Angove as he had not expected to be selected in the first round. Angove made his debut for the Giants in their Round 10 match against Geelong.

== Statistics ==
Updated to the end of the 2025 season.

Legend
G	Goals	K	Kicks	D	Disposals	T	Tackles
B	Behinds	H	Handballs	M	Marks

Season	Team	No.	Games	Totals							Averages (per game)							Votes
Season	Team	No.	Games	G	B	K	H	D	M	T	G	B	K	H	D	M	T	Votes
2025	Greater Western Sydney	29	4	1	1	20	24	44	7	8	0.3	0.3	5.0	6.0	11.0	1.8	2.0	0
Career			4	1	1	20	24	44	7	8	0.3	0.3	5.0	6.0	11.0	1.8	2.0	0
