= Tom Hanily =

Professional Australian rules footballer

Tom Hanily (born 31 May 2005) is a is a professional Australian rules footballer playing for the Sydney Swans in the Australian Football League (AFL). Hanily played his first game for Sydney against Hawthorn in the 2025 opening round. Hanily plays as a small forward.
