= Malakai Champion =

Australian rules footballer (born 2006)

Personal information
- Born: 17 May 2006 (age 20)
- Original team: Mines Rovers
- Height: 172 cm (5 ft 8 in)
- Weight: 69 kg (152 lb)
- Position: Forward

Club information
- Current club: West Coast Eagles
- Number: 37

Playing career
| Years | Club | Games (Goals) |
| 2025– | West Coast Eagles | 10 (4) |

Malakai Champion (born 17 May 2006) is an Australian rules footballer who plays for the West Coast Eagles in the Australian Football League (AFL).

An Indigenous Australian, Champion is a nephew of Eddie Betts and was raised in Kalgoorlie, where he first played senior football aged 15 with Mines Rovers. He moved with his mother to Perth in 2021.

Champion, a small forward, represented Western Australia under-16s at the 2022 AFL National Development Championships, and the same year began playing with Subiaco in Futures matches. After three seasons in the Subiaco Colts, Champion made his senior debut for the club during the 2024 WAFL season. He earned state representative honours again at the 2024 under-18s National Championships.

A product of the West Coast Eagles Next Generation Academy, Champion entered the AFL draft combine in 2024 and was the second-top ranked player in the agility test. He was secured by the Eagles as a Category-B rookie and late in the 2025 AFL season made two league appearances, debuting at home against the GWS Giants. In the 2026 AFL season, Champion featured eight times for the Eagles and in October was secured for another season, signing a one-year deal.
