= 2023 AFL draft =

Draft for the Australian Football League

General information
- Dates: 31 May – Mid-season Draft; 20–21 November – National Draft; 22 November – Pre-Season and Rookie Draft
- Location: Marvel Stadium
- Network: Fox Footy
- Sponsored by: National Australia Bank

Overview
- League: AFL
- First selection: Harley Reid (West Coast)

The 2023 AFL draft consisted of the various periods where the 18 clubs in the Australian Football League (AFL) could trade and recruit players during and following the completion of the 2023 AFL season.

== Key dates ==
Table of key dates
Event	Date(s)
Mid-season rookie draft	31 May 2023
Free agency period	Restricted and Unrestricted: 6 – 13 October 2023; Delisted: 1–8 November and 10 2023
Trade period	9 – 18 October 2023
National draft	First round: 20 November 2023; Second and subsequent rounds: 21 November 2023
Pre-Season and Rookie draft	22 November 2023
Pre-season supplemental selection period	November 27 2023 – February 2024

== 2023 mid-season rookie draft ==
The mid-season draft was held after the conclusion of Round 11 of the 2023 AFL season on 31 May. The draft was only open to clubs with inactive players on their list and vacancies available, such as long-term injuries or retirements.

Mid-season draft selections
Rd	Pick	Player	Club	Recruited from		Pick due to
Rd	Pick	Player	Club	Club	League	Pick due to
1	1	Ryan Maric	West Coast	Gippsland Power	Talent League	Jai Culley long-term injury
1	2	Robert Hansen Jr.	North Melbourne	Subiaco	WAFL	Jack Mahony long-term injury
1	3	Clay Tucker	Hawthorn	Eastern Ranges	Talent League	Max Lynch long-term injury
1	4	Matt Coulthard	Richmond	Glenelg	SANFL	Jason Castagna retirement
1	5	Passed	Greater Western Sydney	—	—	Darcy Jones long-term injury
1	6	Harry Arnold	Sydney	Brisbane Lions	VFL	Sam Reid long-term injury
1	7	Mitch Hardie	Geelong	Woodville-West Torrens	SANFL	Passed selection at the 2022 Rookie Draft
1	8	Ethan Stanley	Fremantle	Box Hill Hawks	VFL	Passed selection at the 2022 Rookie Draft
1	9	Jaiden Hunter	Essendon	Perth	WAFL	Jayden Davey long-term injury
1	10	Caleb Poulter	Western Bulldogs	Footscray	VFL	Passed selection at the 2022 Rookie Draft
1	11	Quinton Narkle	Port Adelaide	Essendon	VFL	Mitch Georgiades long-term injury
2	12	Brandon Ryan	Hawthorn	Northern Bullants	VFL	Passed selection at the 2022 Rookie Draft
2	13	James Trezise	Richmond	Richmond	VFL	Kaleb Smith long-term injury
2	14	Passed	Greater Western Sydney	—	—	Adam Kennedy long-term injury
2	15	Jack Buller	Sydney	Claremont	WAFL	Paddy McCartin long-term injury

== Player movements ==
=== Previously traded selections ===
Table of previously traded selections
Rd	Orig. Club	New Club	Acquired via	Ref
1	Fremantle	Melbourne	Luke Jackson trade	
1	Port Adelaide	North Melbourne	Jason Horne-Francis and Junior Rioli trade	
1	Richmond	Greater Western Sydney	Jacob Hopper trade	
1	Brisbane Lions	Western Bulldogs	Josh Dunkley trade	
2	Collingwood	Port Adelaide	via Greater Western Sydney (Bobby Hill trade) on-traded to Port Adelaide (Jason Horne-Francis and Junior Rioli trade)	
2	North Melbourne (priority)	Fremantle	Griffin Logue and Darcy Tucker trade	
2	Greater Western Sydney	Gold Coast	via Brisbane Lions (pick swap) on-traded to Gold Coast (Tom Berry trade)	
2	Geelong	Brisbane Lions	pick swap	
2	Fremantle	Melbourne	Luke Jackson trade	
2	Port Adelaide	West Coast	Jason Horne-Francis and Junior Rioli trade	
2	Brisbane Lions	Western Bulldogs	Josh Dunkley trade	
2	Western Bulldogs	Hawthorn	via Fremantle (Rory Lobb trade) on-traded to Hawthorn (Jaeger O'Meara and Lloyd Meek trade)	
2	North Melbourne	Adelaide	pick swap	
2	Hawthorn	Sydney	pick swap	
2	Carlton	Collingwood	pick swap	
2	Adelaide	Gold Coast	pick swap	
2	Gold Coast	Adelaide	pick swap	
3	Carlton	Fremantle	Blake Acres trade	
3	North Melbourne (priority)	Fremantle	Griffin Logue and Darcy Tucker trade	
3	Fremantle	Port Adelaide	via North Melbourne (Griffin Logue and Darcy Tucker trade) on-traded to Port Adelaide (Jason Horne-Francis and Junior Rioli trade)	
3	Adelaide	Gold Coast	Izak Rankine trade	
3	Port Adelaide	West Coast	Jason Horne-Francis and Junior Rioli trade	
3	Geelong	Brisbane Lions	via Gold Coast (Jack Bowes trade) on-traded to Adelaide (pick swap) on-traded to Brisbane Lions (pick swap)	
3	Collingwood	Gold Coast	via Adelaide (Billy Frampton trade) on-traded to Gold Coast (pick swap)	
3	Melbourne	North Melbourne	via Western Bulldogs (Lachie Hunter trade) on-traded to Brisbane Lions (Josh Dunkley trade) on-traded to North Melbourne (pick swap)	
3	Western Bulldogs	Hawthorn	via Brisbane Lions (Josh Dunkley trade) on-traded to Hawthorn (pick swap)	
3	Hawthorn	Sydney	pick swap	
4	North Melbourne	Fremantle	Griffin Logue and Darcy Tucker trade	
4	St Kilda	Gold Coast	Ben Long trade	
4	Fremantle	Brisbane Lions	via Gold Coast (Josh Corbett trade) on-traded to Adelaide (Izak Rankine trade) on-traded to Brisbane Lions (pick swap)	
4	Geelong	Western Bulldogs	via Brisbane Lions (pick swap) on-traded to Western Bulldogs (Josh Dunkley trade)	
4	Essendon	Carlton	Will Setterfield trade	
4	Adelaide	Gold Coast	Izak Rankine trade	
4	Brisbane Lions	Greater Western Sydney	via Hawthorn (Jack Gunston trade) on-traded to Greater Western Sydney (pick swap)	
4	Sydney	Essendon	Aaron Francis trade	
4	Melbourne	Brisbane Lions	via Western Bulldogs (Josh Schache trade) on-traded to Brisbane Lions (Josh Dunkley trade)	
4	Hawthorn	North Melbourne	via Fremantle (Jaeger O'Meara and Lloyd Meek trade) on-traded to North Melbourne (pick swap)	

=== Free agency ===
2023 AFL free agency period signings
Player	Free agent type	Recruited from	New club	Compensation	Notes	Ref
James Jordon	Unrestricted	Melbourne	Sydney	End of Second Round		
Matt Flynn	Unrestricted	Greater Western Sydney	West Coast	End of Second Round		
Joel Hamling	Unrestricted	Fremantle	Sydney	None		
Tom Doedee	Restricted	Adelaide	Brisbane Lions	End of First Round		
Todd Goldstein	Unrestricted	North Melbourne	Essendon	None		
Ben McKay	Restricted	North Melbourne	Essendon	First Round		
Jade Gresham	Restricted	St Kilda	Essendon	End of First Round		
Toby Pink	Delisted	Glenelg (SANFL)	North Melbourne	—N/a	Delisted by Sydney in 2019	
Oscar McDonald	Delisted	Williamstown (VFL)	Fremantle	—N/a	Delisted by Carlton in 2022	
Sam Naismith	Delisted	Port Melbourne (VFL)	Richmond	—N/a	Delisted by Sydney in 2022	
Orazio Fantasia	Delisted	Port Adelaide	Carlton	—N/a		

=== Trades ===
Table of trades
Clubs involved	Trade		Ref
Port Adelaide Fremantle	to Port Adelaide (from Fremantle): pick No. 23; 2024 second round pick (Fremantle)	to Fremantle (from Port Adelaide): 2024 first round pick (Port Adelaide)	
Western Bulldogs Gold Coast	to Western Bulldogs (from Gold Coast): pick No. 4; pick No. 46; pick No. 51; 2024 third round pick (Gold Coast)	to Gold Coast (from Western Bulldogs): pick No. 10; pick No. 17; 2024 first round pick (Western Bulldogs)	
Western Bulldogs Melbourne	to Western Bulldogs (from Melbourne): James Harmes	to Melbourne (from Western Bulldogs): 2024 third round pick (Western Bulldogs)	
North Melbourne Sydney	to North Melbourne (from Sydney): Dylan Stephens; pick No. 25	to Sydney (from North Melbourne): pick No. 44; 2024 end of first round priority pick (pick No. 19) (North Melbourne)	
Melbourne Gold Coast	to Melbourne (from Gold Coast): pick No. 11	to Gold Coast (from Melbourne): pick No. 14; pick No. 27; pick No. 35	
Adelaide Gold Coast	to Adelaide (from Gold Coast): Chris Burgess; pick No. 14	to Gold Coast (from Adelaide): pick No. 23; pick No. 26	
North Melbourne Gold Coast	to North Melbourne (from Gold Coast): pick No. 18	to Gold Coast (from North Melbourne): 2024 end of first round priority pick (pick No. 20) (North Melbourne)	
Sydney Melbourne	to Sydney (from Melbourne): Brodie Grundy	to Melbourne (from Sydney): pick No. 46; 2024 second round pick (Sydney)	
Sydney Collingwood	to Sydney (from Collingwood): Taylor Adams	to Collingwood (from Sydney): pick No. 33	
North Melbourne Carlton	to North Melbourne (from Carlton): Zac Fisher; pick No. 17	to Carlton (from North Melbourne): pick No. 21; pick No. 25	
Melbourne Brisbane Lions	to Melbourne (from Brisbane Lions): Tom Fullarton	to Brisbane Lions (from Melbourne): pick No. 47	
West Coast Hawthorn	to West Coast (from Hawthorn): Tyler Brockman	to Hawthorn (from West Coast): pick No. 44; pick No. 63	
North Melbourne Richmond	to North Melbourne (from Richmond): Bigoa Nyuon	to Richmond (from North Melbourne): pick No. 65	
Collingwood Fremantle	to Collingwood (from Fremantle): Lachie Schultz	to Fremantle (from Collingwood): pick No. 34; 2024 first round pick (Collingwood)	
St Kilda Fremantle	to St Kilda (from Fremantle): Liam Henry; 2024 fourth round pick (Fremantle)	to Fremantle (from St Kilda): 2024 second round pick (St Kilda); 2024 fourth round pick (St Kilda)	
Melbourne Adelaide	to Melbourne (from Adelaide): Shane McAdam	to Adelaide (from Melbourne): 2024 second round pick (Melbourne)	
St Kilda Western Bulldogs Carlton Essendon	to St Kilda: Paddy Dow (from Carlton); pick No. 40 (from Western Bulldogs); 2024 third round pick (from Carlton); to Western Bulldogs: Nick Coffield (from St Kilda); pick No. 52 (from Essendon); pick No. 56 (from St Kilda)	to Carlton: 2024 third round pick (from Essendon); 2024 fourth round pick (from Western Bulldogs); 2024 fourth round pick (Fremantle, from St Kilda); to Essendon: pick No. 35 (from St Kilda); 2024 fourth round pick (from Carlton)	
Port Adelaide Richmond	to Port Adelaide (from Richmond): Ivan Soldo; pick No. 50	to Richmond (from Port Adelaide): pick No. 41; pick No. 49; 2024 second round pick (Fremantle); 2024 fourth round pick (Port Adelaide)	
Hawthorn Collingwood	to Hawthorn (from Collingwood): Jack Ginnivan; pick No. 39; 2024 second round pick (Collingwood); 2024 fourth round pick (Collingwood)	to Collingwood (from Hawthorn): pick No. 33; 2024 second round pick (Hawthorn); 2024 third round pick (Hawthorn)	
Port Adelaide Western Bulldogs	to Port Adelaide (from Western Bulldogs): Jordon Sweet	to Western Bulldogs (from Port Adelaide): pick No. 50	
Port Adelaide Geelong	to Port Adelaide (from Geelong): Esava Ratugolea	to Geelong (from Port Adelaide): pick No. 25; pick No. 76; pick No. 94	
Carlton Gold Coast	to Carlton (from Gold Coast): Elijah Hollands; pick No. 28; 2024 fourth round pick (Gold Coast)	to Gold Coast (from Carlton): pick No. 26; 2024 third round pick (Essendon)	
Richmond Hawthorn	to Richmond (from Hawthorn): Jacob Koschitzke	to Hawthorn (from Richmond): pick No. 49	
Melbourne St Kilda	to Melbourne (from St Kilda): Jack Billings	to St Kilda (from Melbourne): 2024 third round pick (Melbourne)	
Hawthorn Brisbane Lions	to Hawthorn (from Brisbane Lions): Jack Gunston; pick No. 47; pick No. 61; 2024 second round pick (Brisbane Lions)	to Brisbane Lions (from Hawthorn): Brandon Ryan; pick No. 39; pick No. 54; 2024 fourth round pick (Hawthorn)	
Hawthorn Gold Coast	to Hawthorn (from Gold Coast): Mabior Chol; pick No. 62	to Gold Coast (from Hawthorn): 2024 second round pick (Brisbane Lions)	
Hawthorn Essendon	to Hawthorn (from Essendon): Massimo D'Ambrosio	to Essendon (from Hawthorn): pick No. 61; 2024 fourth round pick (Collingwood)	
Essendon Port Adelaide	to Essendon (from Port Adelaide): Xavier Duursma	to Port Adelaide (from Essendon): Brandon Zerk-Thatcher; pick No. 73; 2024 fourth round pick (Essendon); 2024 fourth round pick (Carlton)	
Picks swapped at the 2023 National Draft
St Kilda Melbourne	to St Kilda (from Melbourne): pick No. 42	to Melbourne (from St Kilda): 2024 third round pick (St Kilda)	
St Kilda Gold Coast	to St Kilda (from Gold Coast): pick No. 27	to Gold Coast (from St Kilda): pick No. 40; pick No. 42	
Brisbane Lions Gold Coast	to Brisbane Lions (from Gold Coast): pick No. 24	to Gold Coast (from Brisbane Lions): pick No. 30; pick No. 50; pick No. 54; pick No. 65	
Fremantle Gold Coast	to Fremantle (from Gold Coast): pick No. 38	to Gold Coast (from Fremantle): pick No. 46; pick No. 60; pick No. 63	
Adelaide Greater Western Sydney	to Adelaide (from Greater Western Sydney): pick No. 8; pick No. 17	to Greater Western Sydney (from Adelaide): pick No. 11; pick No. 15; 2024 second round pick (Adelaide)	
Essendon Geelong	to Essendon (from Geelong): pick No. 10	to Geelong (from Essendon): pick No. 11; pick No. 31	
Greater Western Sydney St Kilda	to Greater Western Sydney (from St Kilda): pick No. 17	to St Kilda (from Greater Western Sydney): pick No. 18; 2024 second round pick (Adelaide)	
Brisbane Lions Gold Coast	to Brisbane Lions (from Gold Coast): pick No. 51	to Gold Coast (from Brisbane Lions): 2024 fourth round pick (Brisbane Lions)	
Fremantle Richmond	to Fremantle (from Richmond): pick No. 35	to Richmond (from Fremantle): pick No. 38; 2024 third round pick (Fremantle)	
West Coast Richmond	to West Coast (from Richmond): pick No. 38	to Richmond (from West Coast): pick No. 40; 2024 third round pick (West Coast)	
Port Adelaide North Melbourne	to Port Adelaide (from North Melbourne): pick No. 48	to North Melbourne (from Port Adelaide): 2024 fourth round pick (Essendon)	
St Kilda Greater Western Sydney	to St Kilda (from Greater Western Sydney): pick No. 50	to Greater Western Sydney (from St Kilda): 2024 third round pick (Carlton)	
Port Adelaide Hawthorn	to Port Adelaide (from Hawthorn): pick No. 52	to Hawthorn (from Port Adelaide): 2024 fourth round pick (Carlton)	
Essendon Richmond	to Essendon (from Richmond): pick No. 54	to Richmond (from Essendon): 2024 fourth round pick (Collingwood)	
Sydney Hawthorn	to Sydney (from Hawthorn): pick No. 53	to Hawthorn (from Sydney): pick No. 59; 2024 fourth round pick (Sydney)	

== List changes ==
=== Retirements ===
Table key
R	Rookie listed player
B	Category B Rookie listed player

Table of player retirements
Name	Club	Ref
Fischer McAsey	Adelaide	
Jason Castagna	Richmond	
Robbie Tarrant	Richmond	
Jack Ziebell	North Melbourne	
Lance Franklin	Sydney	
Shannon Hurn	West Coast	
Max Lynch	Hawthorn	
Aaron Hall	North Melbourne	
Andrew Phillips	Essendon	
Luke Shuey	West Coast	
Ben Cunnington	North Melbourne	
Isaac Smith	Geelong	
Trent Cotchin	Richmond	
Patrick McCartin R	Sydney	
Nic Naitanui	West Coast	
Jack Riewoldt	Richmond	
Paul Seedsman R	Adelaide	
Daniel Lloyd R	Greater Western Sydney	
Phil Davis	Greater Western Sydney	
Jonathon Ceglar	Geelong	
Tom Jonas	Port Adelaide	
Josh Bruce	Western Bulldogs	
Tom Hickey	Sydney	
Anthony McDonald-Tipungwuti	Essendon	
Marcus Adams	Brisbane Lions	
Ed Curnow R	Carlton	
Daniel Rich	Brisbane Lions	
Michael Hibberd	Melbourne	
Luke Dunstan	Melbourne	
Connor Blakely R	Gold Coast	
Lachie Plowman	Carlton	
Charlie Constable	Gold Coast	
Daniel Howe R	North Melbourne	
Nakia Cockatoo R	Brisbane Lions	
Scott Lycett	Port Adelaide	
Hayden Crozier	Western Bulldogs	

=== Delistings ===
Table key
R	Rookie listed player
B	Category B Rookie listed player

Table of player delistings
Name	Club	Ref
James Stewart	Essendon	
Sam Menegola	Geelong	
Alastair Lord	Essendon	
Rhett Montgomerie R	Essendon	
Cian McBride B	Essendon	
Mitch Hannan	Western Bulldogs	
Kaelan Bradtke R	Richmond	
Nathan Wilson	Fremantle	
Travis Colyer	Fremantle	
Roy Benning	Fremantle	
Sam Simpson	Geelong	
Cooper Whyte	Geelong	
Osca Riccardi R	Geelong	
Anthony Munkara B	Essendon	
Tim O'Brien	Western Bulldogs	
Robbie McComb R	Western Bulldogs	
Cody Raak B	Western Bulldogs	
Luke Foley	West Coast	
Jack Bytel	St Kilda	
Leo Connolly	St Kilda	
Jack Peris B	St Kilda	
Oscar Adams	St Kilda	
Sam Petrevski-Seton	West Coast	
Xavier O'Neill	West Coast	
Greg Clark	West Coast	
Connor West R	West Coast	
Isiah Winder R	West Coast	
Deakyn Smith R	Melbourne	
Jackson Hately	Adelaide	
Tyler Brown R	Adelaide	
Andrew McPherson R	Adelaide	
Tariek Newchurch B	Adelaide	
Riley Bonner	Port Adelaide	
Trent Dumont R	Port Adelaide	
Brynn Teakle R	Port Adelaide	
Nathan Barkla B	Port Adelaide	
Cameron Fleeton	Greater Western Sydney	
Jason Gillbee	Greater Western Sydney	
Emerson Jeka	Hawthorn	
Josh Morris	Hawthorn	
Fionn O'Hara B	Hawthorn	
Jacob Edwards R	North Melbourne	
Lachie Young	North Melbourne	
Flynn Perez	North Melbourne	
Phoenix Spicer	North Melbourne	
Lochie O'Brien R	Carlton	
Josh Honey	Carlton	
Sam Philp	Carlton	
Jed Anderson R	Gold Coast	
Brodie McLaughlin R	Gold Coast	
Trey Ruscoe	Collingwood	
Trent Bianco	Collingwood	
Tom Wilson B	Collingwood	
Arlo Draper	Collingwood	
Cooper Murley R	Collingwood	
Ryan Clarke	Sydney	
Will Gould	Sydney	
Hugo Hall-Kahan R	Sydney	
Cameron Owen R	Sydney	
Lachlan Rankin	Sydney	
Marc Sheather B	Sydney	
Toby McLean	Western Bulldogs	
Lachlan Bramble	Hawthorn	
Fergus Greene	Hawthorn	
Ned Long R	Hawthorn	
Kayne Turner R	North Melbourne	
Aiden Bonar	North Melbourne	
Jack Mahony	North Melbourne	
Rhys Mathieson R	Brisbane Lions	
Blake Coleman	Brisbane Lions	
Daryl McDowell-White Jr. R	Brisbane Lions	
Kye Turner R	Melbourne	
Will Snelling	Essendon	
Patrick Voss R	Essendon	
Jeremy Sharp	Gold Coast	
Jake Stein R	Gold Coast	
Flynn Kroeger	Geelong	
Will Kelly	Collingwood	
Orazio Fantasia	Port Adelaide	
Sam Hayes	Port Adelaide	
Jake Pasini	Port Adelaide	
James Borlase B	Adelaide	
Roarke Smith	Western Bulldogs	
Taylor Duryea	Western Bulldogs	
Lachie McNeil	Western Bulldogs	
Adam Kennedy	Greater Western Sydney	
Tom Highmore	St Kilda	
Jake Melksham	Melbourne	
Daniel McKenzie	St Kilda	
Chad Wingard	Hawthorn	
Cooper Stephens	Hawthorn	
Will Hamill	Adelaide	

== North Melbourne concessions ==
For the second year in a row, due to the club's poor on-field results since 2020, the AFL announced draft concessions for North Melbourne which included:

- One end-of-first round selection in the 2023 AFL Draft (currently pick 22)
- Two end-of-first round selections in the 2024 AFL Draft (currently picks 19 and 20)
- The continuation of two extra Category A Rookie list spots.

== 2023 national draft ==
^	Denotes player who has been inducted to the Australian Football Hall of Fame
*	Denotes player who has been a premiership player and been selected for at least one All-Australian team
^{+}	Denotes player who has been a premiership player at least once
^{x}	Denotes player who has been selected for at least one All-Australian team
^{#}	Denotes player who has never played in a VFL/AFL home and away season or finals game
^{~}	Denotes player who has been selected as Rising Star

Table of national draft selections
Round	Pick	Player	Club	Recruited from		Notes
Round	Pick	Player	Club	Club	League	Notes
1	1	Harley Reid	West Coast	Bendigo Pioneers	Talent League	
1	2	Colby McKercher	North Melbourne	Tasmania Devils	Talent League	
1	3	Jed Walter	Gold Coast	Palm Beach Currumbin	QAFL	Academy selection, matched bid by North Melbourne
1	4	Zane Duursma	North Melbourne	Gippsland Power	Talent League	Free Agency Compensation pick (McKay)
1	5	Nick Watson	Hawthorn	Eastern Ranges	Talent League	
1	6	Ryley Sanders	Western Bulldogs	Sandringham Dragons	Talent League	←Gold Coast
1	7	Caleb Windsor	Melbourne	Eastern Ranges	Talent League	←Fremantle (2022)
1	8	Daniel Curtin	Adelaide	Claremont	WAFL	←Greater Western Sydney←Richmond (2022)
1	9	Ethan Read	Gold Coast	Palm Beach Currumbin	QAFL	Academy selection, matched bid by Geelong
1	10	Nate Caddy	Essendon	Northern Knights	Talent League	←Geelong
1	11	Connor O'Sullivan	Geelong	Murray Bushrangers	Talent League	←Essendon
1	12	Phoenix Gothard	Greater Western Sydney	Murray Bushrangers	Talent League	←Adelaide
1	13	Koltyn Tholstrup	Melbourne	Subiaco	WAFL	←Gold Coast←Western Bulldogs
1	14	Jake Rogers	Gold Coast	Broadbeach	QAFL	Academy selection, matched bid by Sydney
1	15	Jordan Croft	Western Bulldogs	Calder Cannons	Talent League	Father–son selection (son of Matthew Croft), matched bid by Sydney
1	16	Will Green	Sydney	Northern Knights	Talent League	
1	17	James Leake	Greater Western Sydney	Tasmania Devils	Talent League	←St Kilda
1	18	Darcy Wilson	St Kilda	Murray Bushrangers	Talent League	←Greater Western Sydney←Adelaide ←Gold Coast←Melbourne
1	19	Will McCabe	Hawthorn	Central District	SANFL	Father–son selection (son of Luke McCabe), matched bid by North Melbourne
1	20	Taylor Goad	North Melbourne	South Adelaide	SANFL	←Port Adelaide (2022)
1	21	Charlie Edwards	Adelaide	Sandringham Dragons	Talent League	←Greater Western Sydney
1	22	Wil Dawson	North Melbourne	Gippsland Power	Talent League	←Carlton
1	23	Riley Hardeman	North Melbourne	Swan Districts	WAFL	←Gold Coast←Western Bulldogs←Brisbane Lions (2022)
1	24	Caiden Cleary	Sydney	Sydney University	AFL Sydney	Academy selection, matched bid by Collingwood
1	25	Harry DeMattia	Collingwood	Dandenong Stingrays	Talent League	
1	26	Will Graham	Gold Coast	Palm Beach Currumbin	QAFL	Academy selection, matched bid by Adelaide
1	27	Oscar Ryan	Adelaide	Murray Bushrangers	Talent League	Free Agency Compensation pick (Doedee)
1	28	Lance Collard	St Kilda	Subiaco	WAFL	Free Agency Compensation pick (Gresham)
1	29	Ashton Moir	Carlton	Glenelg	SANFL	←North Melbourne (priority)
2	30	Archer Reid	West Coast	Gippsland Power	Talent League	
2	31	Logan Morris	Brisbane Lions	Western Jets	Talent League	←Gold Coast←Adelaide←North Melbourne (2022)
2	32	Mitchell Edwards	Geelong	Peel Thunder	WAFL	←Port Adelaide←Fremantle←North Melbourne (2022 priority pick)
2	33	Angus Hastie	St Kilda	Geelong Falcons	Talent League	←Gold Coast←Adelaide←Gold Coast (2022)
2	34	Billy Wilson	Carlton	Dandenong Stingrays	Talent League	←Gold Coast←North Melbourne←Melbourne←Fremantle (2022)
2	35	Cooper Simpson	Fremantle	Dandenong Stingrays	Talent League	←Richmond
2	36	Shaun Mannagh	Geelong	Werribee	VFL	←Essendon
2	37	Tew Jiath	Collingwood	Gippsland Power	Talent League	←Hawthorn←Fremantle (2022)←Western Bulldogs (2022)
2	38	Clay Hall	West Coast	Peel Thunder	WAFL	←Richmond←Fremantle←Collingwood←Sydney
2	39	Luamon Lual	Essendon	Greater Western Victoria Rebels	Talent League	←St Kilda
2	40	Kane McAuliffe	Richmond	North Adelaide	SANFL	←West Coast←Port Adelaide (2022)
2	41	Ollie Murphy	Fremantle	Sandringham Dragons	Talent League	←Gold Coast←Brisbane Lions (2022)←Greater Western Sydney (2022)
2	42	Luke Lloyd	Brisbane Lions	Sandringham Dragons	Talent League	←Hawthorn←Collingwood ←Carlton (2022)
2	43	Liam Fawcett	Richmond	Central District	SANFL	←Port Adelaide←Greater Western Sydney (2022)←Collingwood (2022)
2	44	Joe Fonti	Greater Western Sydney	Claremont	WAFL	Free Agency Compensation pick (Flynn)
3	45	Joel Freijah	Western Bulldogs	Greater Western Victoria Rebels	Talent League	←Gold Coast
3	46	Bodie Ryan	Hawthorn	Glenelg	SANFL	←Richmond←Port Adelaide←North Melbourne (2022)←Fremantle (2022)
3	47	Lachlan Smith	Western Bulldogs	Gippsland Power	Talent League	←Port Adelaide←Richmond
3	48	Thomas Anastasopoulos	Port Adelaide	Geelong Falcons	Talent League	←North Melbourne←Brisbane Lions (2022)←Western Bulldogs (2022)←Melbourne (2022)
3	49	Harvey Johnston	West Coast	Sandringham Dragons	Talent League	←Port Adelaide (2022)
3	50	Hugo Garcia	St Kilda	Calder Cannons	Talent League	←Greater Western Sydney
3	51	Zane Zakostelsky	Brisbane Lions	Claremont	WAFL	←Gold Coast←Fremantle←Carlton (2022)
3	52	Lachlan Charleson	Port Adelaide	Greater Western Victoria Rebels	Talent League	←Hawthorn←Gold Coast ←Adelaide (2022)←Collingwood (2022)
4	53	Patrick Snell	Sydney	Wilston Grange	QAFL	←Hawthorn←West Coast
4	54	Archie Roberts	Essendon	Sandringham Dragons	Talent League	←Richmond←North Melbourne←Fremantle (2022)←Hawthorn (2022)
4	55	Aiden O'Driscoll	Western Bulldogs	Perth	WAFL	←Brisbane Lions (2022)←Geelong (2022)
4	56	Calsher Dear	Hawthorn	Sandringham Dragons	Talent League	Father–son selection (son of Paul Dear) ←Sydney
4	57	Will Lorenz	Port Adelaide	Oakleigh Chargers	Talent League	←Essendon ←Sydney (2022)
4	58	George Stevens	Geelong	Greater Western Victoria Rebels	Talent League	←Port Adelaide
4	59	Harvey Thomas	Greater Western Sydney	Oakleigh Chargers	Talent League	Academy selection
5	60	Jack Delean	Fremantle	South Adelaide	SANFL	
5	61	Oliver Wiltshire	Geelong	Barwon Heads	BFNL	
5	62	Arie Schoenmaker	St Kilda	Tasmania Devils	Talent League	
5	63	Lawson Humphries	Geelong	Swan Districts	WAFL	←Port Adelaide
5	64	Reece Torrent	Brisbane Lions	Peel Thunder	WAFL	

=== Rookie elevations ===
Table of rookie elevations
Player	Club
Nick Murray	Adelaide
Carter Michael	Brisbane Lions
Matt Cottrell	Carlton
Ash Johnson	Collingwood
Oleg Markov	Collingwood
Oscar Steene	Collingwood
Kaine Baldwin	Essendon
Bailey Banfield	Fremantle
Josh Treacy	Fremantle
Hewago Oea	Gold Coast
Jai Newcombe	Hawthorn
Daniel Turner	Melbourne
Ben Miller	Richmond
Mason Wood	St Kilda
Liam Stocker	St Kilda
Robbie Fox	Sydney
Anthony Scott	Western Bulldogs

== 2023 pre-season draft ==
Round	Pick	Player	Club	Recruited from	
Round	Pick	Player	Club	Club	League
1	1	Chad Wingard	Hawthorn	Hawthorn	AFL
1	2	Sam Day	Gold Coast	Gold Coast	AFL
1	3	Riley Bonner	St Kilda	Port Adelaide	AFL

== 2024 rookie draft ==
Rookie draft selections
Round	Pick	Player	Club	Recruited from		Notes
Round	Pick	Player	Club	Club	League	Notes
1	1	Loch Rawlinson	West Coast	Sturt	SANFL	
1	2	Finnbar Maley	North Melbourne	Northern Bullants	VFL	
1	3	Cooper Stephens	Hawthorn	Hawthorn	AFL	
1	4	Sam Clohesy	Gold Coast	Werribee	VFL	
1	5	Odin Jones	Fremantle	West Perth	WAFL	
1	6	Passed	Richmond	—	—	
1	7	Emerson Jeka	Geelong	Hawthorn	AFL	
1	8	Vigo Visentini	Essendon	Sandringham Dragons	Talent League	
1	9	Will Hamill	Adelaide	Adelaide	AFL	
1	10	Lachlan McNeil	Western Bulldogs	Western Bulldogs	AFL	
1	11	Sam Reid	Sydney	Sydney	AFL	
1	12	Jake Melksham	Melbourne	Melbourne	AFL	
1	13	Xavier Walsh	Port Adelaide	East Perth	WAFL	
1	14	Adam Kennedy	Greater Western Sydney	Greater Western Sydney	AFL	
1	15	Matt Carroll	Carlton	Sandringham Dragons	Talent League	
1	16	Passed	Collingwood	—	—	
2	17	Passed	North Melbourne	—	—	
2	18	Will Rowlands	Gold Coast	Norwood	SANFL	
2	19	Passed	Fremantle	—	—	
2	20	James Borlase	Adelaide	Adelaide	AFL	
2	21	Taylor Duryea	Western Bulldogs	Western Bulldogs	AFL	
2	22	Kynan Brown	Melbourne	Oakleigh Chargers	Talent League	Father–son selection (son of Nathan Brown)
2	23	Passed	Collingwood	—	—	
3	24	Jack Mahony	Gold Coast	North Melbourne	AFL	
3	25	Passed	Western Bulldogs	—	—	
3	26	Passed	Melbourne	—	—	
3	27	Passed	Collingwood	—	—	
4	28	Passed	Gold Coast	—	—	
5	29	Passed	Gold Coast	—	—	

=== Category B rookie selections ===
Table of Category B rookie selections
Name	Club	Origin	Note	Ref
Bruce Reville	Brisbane Lions	Sherwood Districts (QAFL)	Academy selection	
Rob Monahan	Carlton	Kerry GAA	International selection (Ireland)	
Wil Parker	Collingwood	Victoria cricket team	3-year non-registered player (cricket)	
Joe Furphy	Geelong	Melbourne University (Big V)	Three-year non-registered player (basketball)	
Nathan Wardius	Greater Western Sydney	Rand-Walbundrie-Walla Giants (HFNL)	Academy selection	
Oliver Hayes-Brown	Richmond	Perth Wildcats (NBL)	Three-year non-registered player (basketball)	
Liam O'Connell	St Kilda	Cork GAA	International selection (Ireland)	
Indhi Kirk	Sydney	Sydney (VFL)	Academy selection (Also the son of Brett Kirk)	
Coen Livingstone	West Coast	Perth (WAFL)	Next Generation Academy selection (Indigenous)	

=== Pre-season supplemental selection period ===
Table of Pre-season supplemental selection period signings
Player	Club	Recruited from		Notes	Ref
Player	Club	Club	League	Notes	Ref
Lachie Sullivan	Collingwood	Footscray	VFL		
Josh Eyre	Collingwood	Collingwood	VFL	Previously listed with Essendon	
Jack Bytel	Collingwood	St Kilda	AFL		
Jeremy Sharp	Fremantle	Gold Coast	AFL		
Patrick Voss	Fremantle	Essendon	AFL		
Ethan Phillips	Hawthorn	Port Melbourne	VFL		
Marty Hore	Melbourne	Williamstown	VFL	Previously listed with Melbourne	
Tyler Sellers	North Melbourne	North Melbourne	VFL		
Mykelti Lefau	Richmond	Richmond	VFL		
Lachlan Bramble	Western Bulldogs	Hawthorn	AFL		

== See also ==
- 2023 AFL Women's supplementary draft
- 2023 AFL Women's draft
