= Schwarze =

Schwarze may refer to

== River ==
- Schwärze, a river of Brandenburg, Germany

== People with the surname ==
- Achim Schwarze (born 1958), German author
- Ben Schwarze (born 1983), Australian rules football player
- Hugo Schwarze (born 2006), German racing driver
- Troy Schwarze (born 1981), Australian rules footballer
