= Vlahov =

Vlahov (Bulgarian: Влахов) is a surname. Notable people with the surname include:

- Andrew Vlahov (born 1969), Australian basketball player
- Dimitar Vlahov (1878–1953), politician
- Len Vlahov (1940–1997), Australian athlete
