= Athletics at the 1967 Summer Universiade – Men's discus throw =

The men's discus throw event at the 1967 Summer Universiade was held at the National Olympic Stadium in Tokyo on 31 August 1967.

== Results ==
Rank	Name	Nationality	Result	Notes
1st place, gold medalist(s)	Gary Carlsen	United States	59.84	
2nd place, silver medalist(s)	Hein-Direck Neu	West Germany	55.34	
3rd place, bronze medalist(s)	Neal Steinhauer	United States	53.16	
4	Len Vlahov	Australia	52.52	
5	Gilberto Ferrini	Italy	51.76	
6	Gaetano Dalla Pria	Italy	51.40	
7	Jacques Nyss	France	50.16	
8	Toshihara Aoyama	Japan	47.26	
9	Shigenobu Murofushi	Japan	45.00	
10	Cláudio Romanini	Brazil	44.76	
