= Sandringham Dragons =

Victorian football club

Names
- Full name: Sandringham Dragons Football Club
- Former name(s): Central Dragons (1992-1994); Prahran Dragons (1995-1999)
- Nickname: Dragons

2026 season
- After finals: 3rd
- Home-and-away season: 6th

Club details
- Founded: 1992; 34 years ago
- Colours: Navy Blue Maroon
- Competition: Talent League
- Premierships: Talent League (6) 1999, 2011, 2016, 2022, 2023, 2024
- Ground: Trevor Barker Beach Oval, Sandringham

Other information
- Official website: SDFC

Sandringham Dragons is an Australian rules football club playing in the Talent League, the top statewide under-18 competition in Victoria, Australia. They are based at the Moorabbin Oval in Moorabbin, Victoria, representing the southern suburban area of Melbourne. Formed as Central Dragons, the club was one of the founding metropolitan clubs of the competition in 1992 as part of a plan by the Victorian State Football League to replace the traditional club zones with independent junior clubs. This was to help aid in player development and the process of the AFL draft.

The club was originally named the Central Dragons and based at Princes Park in Caulfield South, Victoria. In 1995 the name of the club was changed to Prahran Dragons as part of the agreement which saw the Prahran Two Blues exit the senior Victorian Football Association. In 2000, the club relocated to the Trevor Barker Beach Oval in Sandringham and changed its name for the new locality. The club has since moved its administration and training base to the upgraded Moorabbin Oval (RSEA Park) in Linton St. Moorabbin.

== AFL Draftees History ==
- 1992: Tim Scott-Branagan, Aaron Lord, Matthew Jackson, Adam Williamson, Mathew Moon North,
- 1993: Scott Mollard, Julian Kirzner, Simon Garlick, Sedat Sir, Simon Beaumont, Justin Murphy
- 1994: David Bourke, Carl Steinfort, John Rombotis, Marty Warry, Matthew Robbins
- 1995: Nick Jewell, Jason Cripps, Brent Williams
- 1996: Brett O'Farrell, Will Sangster
- 1997: John Hynes,
- 1998: David Gallagher, Danny Jacobs, Troy Schwarze
- 1999: David Spriggs, Ezra Poyas, Jason Blake, Mark Ainley, Jeremy Dukes, Nick Stone, Damien Lyon, Mark Wittison, Olly Trand
- 2000: Dylan Smith, Nick Ries, Ted Richards, Steven Greene, Luke Hammond, Scott Thornton, Michael Davis, Matthew Ball, Leigh Harrison
- 2001: Luke Ball, Chris Judd, Charlie Gardiner, Rod Crowe, Ben Schwarze, Mark Dubyna
- 2002: Darren Walsh, Jobe Watson, Leigh Fisher
- 2003: Fergus Watts, Luke Peel, Andrew Eriksen
- 2004: Thomas Murphy, Will Thursfield, Joseph Krieger
- 2005: Robert Warnock, Simon Buckley, Matt Thomas, Daniel Hughes, Simon Phillips
- 2006: Josh P. Kennedy, Tom Hawkins, Chris Dawes
- 2007: Myke Cook, Luke Casey-Leigh, John Shaw, Shane Valenti
- 2008: Jack Watts, Ty Vickery, Tom Lynch, Mitchell Brown, Taylor Hunt, Luke Lowden, Taylor Gilchrist, Samuel McGarry, Matt Suckling
- 2009: Jack Gunston, Max Gawn
- 2010: Ben Jacobs, Daniel Farmer, Jarryd Lyons,
- 2011: Liam Sumner, Jackson Paine, Alex Woodward, Fletcher Roberts, Sam Frost, Ben Darrou
- 2012: James Stewart, Tom Temay, Xavier Richards
- 2013: Josh Kelly, Nathan Freeman, Zach Merrett, Tom Langdon, Karl Amon, Kurt Heatherley
- 2014: Angus Brayshaw, Brayden Maynard, Ed Vickers-Willis, Ed Langdon, Harry Dear, Josh Clayton, Michael Manteit, Sean McLaren, Will Fordham
- 2015: Harley Balic
- 2016: Andrew McGrath, Tim Taranto, Will Setterfield, Jack Scrimshaw, Oliver Florent, Cameron Polson, Corey Lyons, Lachlan Filipovic
- 2017: Andrew Brayshaw, Will Walker, Charlie Constable, Nathan Murphy, Hamish Brayshaw, Angus Styles, Joel Amartey
- 2018: Max King, Ben King, Bailey Smith, Liam Stocker, Joel Crocker, Harry Reynolds
- 2019: Fischer McAsey, Miles Bergman, Josh Worrell, Finn Maginness, Jack Mahony, Hugo Ralphsmith, Ryan Byrnes, Louis Butler, Jack Bell
- 2020: Archie Perkins, Max Holmes, Jake Bowey, Fraser Rosman, Ollie Lord
- 2021: Finn Callaghan, Josh Sinn, Campbell Chesser, Mitchito Owens, Blake Howes, Marcus Windhager, Dante Visentini, Luke Cleary
- 2022: Will Ashcroft, Harry Sheezel, Cam Mackenzie, Charlie Clarke, Toby McMullin, Olli Hotton, Benjamin Munro
- 2023: Ryley Sanders, Charlie Edwards, Ollie Murphy, Luke Lloyd, Harvey Johnston, Archie Roberts, Calsher Dear, Vigo Visentini, Matt Carroll
- 2024: Levi Ashcroft, Taj Hotton, Murphy Reid, Harrison Oliver, Luke Trainor, Harry Armstrong, Sam Marshall, Josh Dolan, Luke Kennedy, Lennox Hofmann
- 2025: Jack Dalton, Archie Ludowyke, Kye Fincher

== Honours ==
- Premierships (6): 1999, 2011, 2016, 2022, 2023, 2024
- Runners-up (2): 2017, 2025
- Minor Premiers (1): 1998
- Wooden Spoons (4): 1992, 1996, 2007, 2009

Sandringham is the second club in the Talent League Boys to achieve 3 consecutive premierships, the first being the Northern Knights, with 4 consecutive premierships from 1993 to 1996.

== Yearly Ladder Placings (1992 - 2019) ==
Year	92	93	94	95	96	97	98	99	00	01	02	03	04	05	06	07	08	09	10	11	12	13	14	15	16	17	18	19
Position	6	3	4	10	14	8	1	3	5	10	13	11	7	9	7	12	9	13	5	2	4	9	5	9	5	4	4	4
