= Ryley Sanders =

Personal information
- Full name: Ryley Sanders
- Nicknames: Colonel, Bernie
- Born: 21 January 2005 (age 21)
- Original team: North Launceston(TSL) /Sandringham Dragons(Talent League)/Melbourne Grammar(APS)
- Draft: No. 6, 2023 AFL draft
- Height: 186 cm (6 ft 1 in)
- Position: Forward

Club information
- Current club: Western Bulldogs
- Number: 9

Playing career^{1}
Years	Club	Games (Goals)
2024–	Western Bulldogs	54 (17)
- ^{1} Playing statistics correct to the end of round 22, 2026.

Career highlights
- Larke Medal (2023)

Ryley Sanders (born 21 January 2005) is a professional Australian rules footballer who was selected by Western Bulldogs as the number six pick in the 2023 AFL draft.

== Career ==
Sanders a Tasmanian native, played his junior football at North Launceston Bombers and school football for St Patrick’s College before playing for the Tasmania Devils in the NAB League for the 2021 season. He would relocate to Victoria, boarding at Melbourne Grammar School for 2022 and 2023 and switched to the Sandringham Dragons. His efforts in the U18 league, where he didn't tally less than 25 disposals a game, led to his selection in the championship winning Allies team for the AFL Under-19 Championships. Winning the Larke Medal for best player of the tournament.

Due to his Indigenous background (Palawa), he was linked with the North Melbourne Next Generation Academy (NGA), during his final year in the Under 18 competition, although due to AFL rules around NGA's, his draft rights could only be matched by North Melbourne if he was selected after Pick 40. He would instead be drafted by the Western Bulldogs with Pick 6, after North Melbourne used Pick 2 and 4 on Colby McKercher and Zane Duursma.

Sanders made his AFL debut in the Bulldog's Round 1 match against Melbourne in a 45-point loss.

== Statistics ==
Updated to the end of round 22, 2026.

Legend
G	Goals	K	Kicks	D	Disposals	T	Tackles
B	Behinds	H	Handballs	M	Marks

Season	Team	No.	Games	Totals							Averages (per game)							Votes
Season	Team	No.	Games	G	B	K	H	D	M	T	G	B	K	H	D	M	T	Votes
2024	Western Bulldogs	9	14	0	2	90	141	231	33	65	0.0	0.1	6.4	10.1	16.5	2.4	4.6	1
2025	Western Bulldogs	9	21	13	5	124	266	390	63	62	0.6	0.2	5.9	12.7	18.6	3.0	3.0	2
2026	Western Bulldogs	9	19	4	4	169	283	452	64	75	0.2	0.2	8.9	14.9	23.8	3.4	3.9	0
Career			54	17	11	383	690	1073	160	202	0.3	0.2	7.1	12.8	19.9	3.0	3.7	3
