= Geordie Payne =

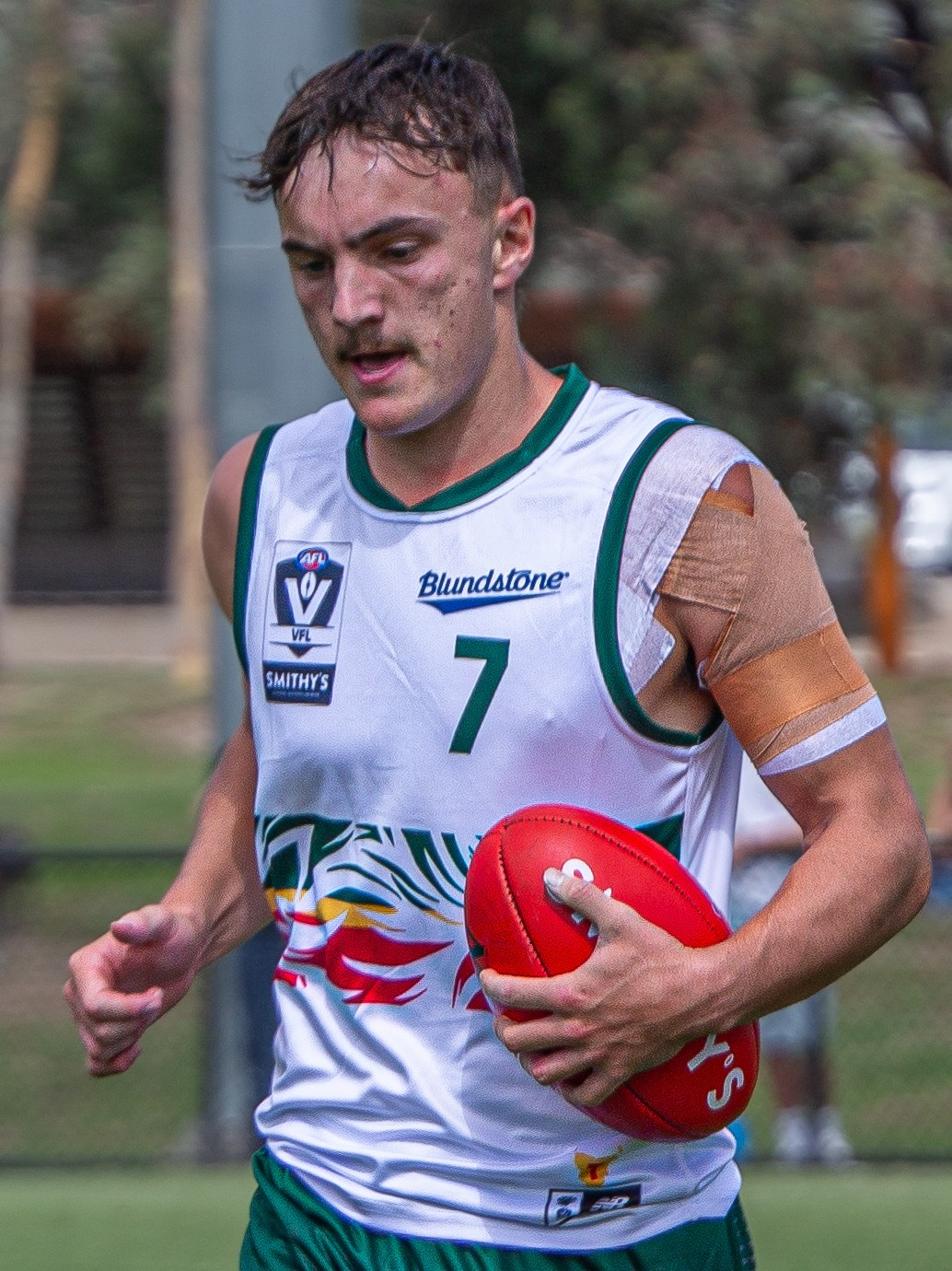
- Payne playing for Tasmania in 2026

Personal information
- Born: 6 November 2005 (age 20)
- Original team: North Launceston/Tasmania Devils (Talent League)
- Draft: No. 1, 2024 mid-season rookie draft
- Debut: Round 22, 2025, North Melbourne vs. Greater Western Sydney, at Manuka Oval
- Height: 184 cm (6 ft 0 in)
- Position: Midfielder/Forward

Club information
- Current club: Tasmania
- Number: 7

Playing career^{1}
Years	Club	Games (Goals)
2024–2025	North Melbourne	3 (3)
- ^{1} Playing statistics correct to the end of the 2025 season.

Geordie Payne (born 6 November 2005) is a former professional Australian rules footballer who played for the North Melbourne Football Club in the Australian Football League (AFL). He currently plays for the Tasmania Football Club in the VFL.

== Junior career ==
Payne played for the Tasmania Devils in the Talent League. Originally playing as an intercepting defender, he switched to a midfielder-forward role in 2024 that saw him average 22 disposals and 2.4 goals a game.

== AFL career ==
Payne was drafted with pick 1 of the 2024 mid-season rookie draft by North Melbourne. He made his debut in round 22 of the 2025 AFL season.

Following the conclusion of the 2025 season, Payne was delisted by North Melbourne.

== Post-AFL career ==
Following his delisting, Payne signed with the Tasmania Football Club ahead of their first season in the VFL.

== Statistics ==
Updated to the end of the 2025 season.

Legend
G	Goals	K	Kicks	D	Disposals	T	Tackles
B	Behinds	H	Handballs	M	Marks

Season	Team	No.	Games	Totals							Averages (per game)							Votes
Season	Team	No.	Games	G	B	K	H	D	M	T	G	B	K	H	D	M	T	Votes
2024	North Melbourne	23	0	—	—	—	—	—	—	—	—	—	—	—	—	—	—	0
2025	North Melbourne	23	3	3	1	7	9	16	2	6	1.0	0.3	2.3	3.0	5.3	0.7	2.0	0
Career			3	3	1	7	9	16	2	6	1.0	0.3	2.3	3.0	5.3	0.7	2.0	0
