= Will Green (Australian footballer) =

Australian rules footballer (born 2005)

Personal information
- Full name: William Green
- Born: 8 September 2005 (age 21)
- Original team: Northcote Cougars
- Draft: No. 16, 2023 national draft
- Height: 204 cm (6 ft 8 in)
- Position: Ruckman

Club information
- Current club: Sydney Swans
- Number: 45

Playing career^{1}
Years	Club	Games (Goals)
2026–	Sydney Swans	3 (0)
- ^{1} Playing statistics correct to the end of the 2026 season.

William Green (born 8 September 2005) is an Australian rules footballer who plays for the Sydney Swans in the Australian Football League (AFL).

Green attended Thornbury High School while growing up in Melbourne.

A 204 cm ruckman, Green was a Northcote Cougars junior and served as co-captain of the Northern Knights, earning a place in the 2023 Talent League Team of the Year. He also gained All-Australian honours representing Vic Metro at that year's AFL National Under-18s Championships, where he averaged 24 hit-outs and three clearances.

Green was selected by the Sydney Swans with pick 16 in the 2023 national draft. In round 22 of the 2026 AFL season, Green was called up to make his senior debut against Port Adelaide at the SCG, after Brodie Grundy pulled out for personal reasons. He had 20 hit-outs and 11 disposals in a 97-point win for the Swans.
