= Jeromey Webberley =

Australian rules footballer and coach (born 1988)

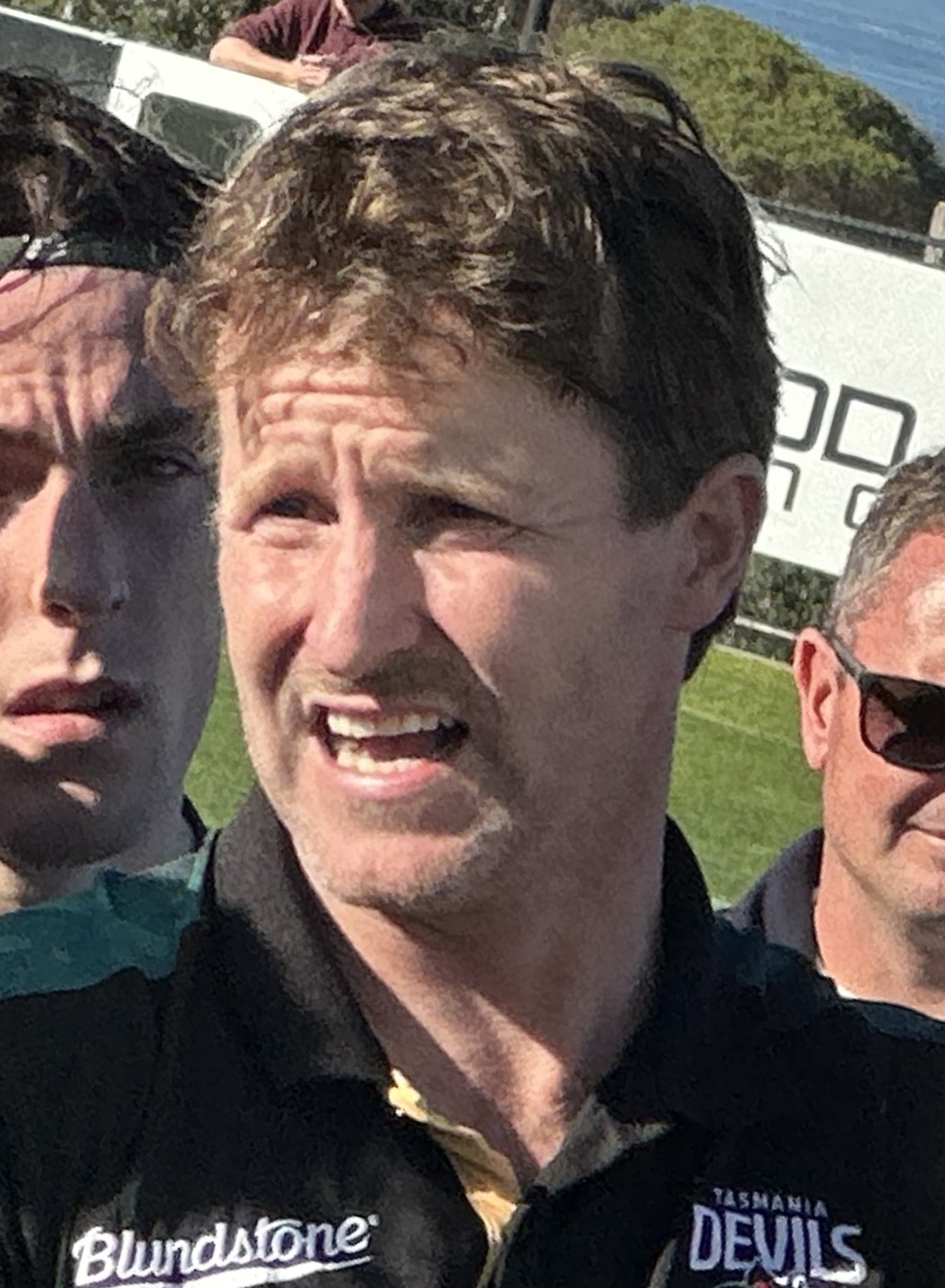
- Webberley in July 2026

Personal information
- Full name: Jeromey Webberley
- Born: 12 July 1988 (age 38)
- Original team: Clarence (TFL)
- Draft: No. 67, 2009 national draft, Richmond
- Height: 181 cm (5 ft 11 in)
- Weight: 78 kg (172 lb)
- Position: Midfielder

Playing career^{1}
Years	Club	Games (Goals)
2010–2012	Richmond	16 (3)
- ^{1} Playing statistics correct to the end of 2012.

Jeromey Webberley is an Australian rules footballer and coach who played for the Richmond Football Club.

== Career ==
=== Playing career: 2009–2012 ===
Webberly was drafted by Richmond in the fifth round of the 2009 national draft, and made his debut against Adelaide in round 7 of the 2010 season. He was a success story of the new Tasmanian Football League (TSL), and was drafted because of his courageous efforts throughout the season and on grand final day kicked a miracle goal from 60m out to win Clarence the grand final against Glenorchy in 2009. Webberley was the winner of the 2009 RACT Insurance player of the year.

At the conclusion of the 2012 season, Richmond announced that Webberley had been delisted.

=== Coaching career: 2016–present ===
In 2016, Webberley was appointed coach of the Clarence Football Club following the resignation of Trent Bartlett.

At the end of the 2021 season, he moved into the role of Tasmania Devils coach in the NAB League Boys and NAB League Girls competitions.
