= Eva Kampe =

Personal information
- Full name: Ieva Kampe
- Born: 29 November 1940 (age 85) Latvia

Sport
- Sport: Athletics
Medal record
Women's athletics
Representing Western Australia
Australian Championships
Silver medal – second place	1962 Adelaide	Modern pentathlon
Bronze medal – third place	1962 Adelaide	Long jump

Ieva "Eva" Kampe (married name Vlahov; born 29 November 1940) is a former Latvian-Australian track and field athlete who represented Australia in the long jump at the 1962 British Empire and Commonwealth Games. She placed fourth in the event, and also won two medals at the Australian Athletics Championships.

== Early life ==
Kampe was born in Latvia, arriving in Australia after the Second World War as a refugee and settling in Perth with her family. Two of her uncles were murdered during the 1940 Soviet occupation of Latvia, while her maternal grandparents were killed during the Latvian War of Independence. Kampe's father, Leo, had been a minister in the Evangelical Lutheran Church of Latvia, and continued his ministry after arriving in Australia, supported by the Lutheran Church of Australia.

== Athletics career ==
At the 1962 Australian Open Track and Field Championships, held in Adelaide, Kampe won a silver medal in the modern pentathlon and a bronze medal in the long jump. Later in the year, she was selected to represent Australia at the 1962 British Empire and Commonwealth Games, which Perth hosted. Her only event was the long jump, where she was one of four Australian competitors. The Australians took out the first four places, with Pamela Ryan taking gold, Helen Frith silver, and Janet Knee bronze. Kampe jumped 19 feet 3 3/4 inches (5.89 m), which was 9 1/2 inches (0.24 m) behind Knee's best jump.

== Family ==
Kampe married Len Vlahov, who also represented Australia in athletics at the 1962 Perth Games. Their son, Andrew Vlahov, became a professional basketball player, while a grandson, Griffin Logue, is a professional Australian rules footballer.
