= Luke Lloyd =

Personal information
- Full name: Luke Lloyd
- Born: 8 August 2005 (age 21)
- Original team: Sandringham Dragons (Talent League)
- Draft: No. 42, 2023 national draft
- Height: 193 cm (6 ft 4 in)
- Weight: 84 kg (185 lb)
- Position: Forward

Club information
- Current club: Brisbane Lions
- Number: 39

Playing career^{1}
| Years | Club | Games (Goals) |
| 2024– | Brisbane Lions | 0 (0) |
- ^{1} Playing statistics correct to the end of 2026.

Luke Lloyd (born 8 August 2005) is a professional Australian rules football player who is currently listed with the Brisbane Lions in the Australian Football League (AFL). Lloyd was selected by Brisbane with pick 42 in the 2023 AFL national draft. He began his career at the Sandringham Dragons in Victoria’s Talent League.

== Early life and junior career ==
Lloyd attended De La Salle College, where he played school football. In May 2023, he gained national attention after kicking 19 goals in a single school match.

Lloyd also played for the Sandringham Dragons in the Talent League. He was invited to the AFL draft combine based on his club form, despite not being selected for Vic Metro.

== AFL career ==
=== Brisbane Lions ===
Lloyd was recruited to the Brisbane Lions with pick 42 in the 2023 national draft.
