= Harvey Johnston =

Australian rules footballer (born 2005)

Personal information
- Born: 18 August 2005 (age 21)
- Original team: Mordialloc Braeside JFC
- Draft: No. 49, 2023 national draft
- Height: 185 cm (6 ft 1 in)
- Weight: 79 kg (174 lb)
- Position: Utility

Playing career
Years	Club	Games (Goals)
2024–2026	West Coast Eagles	14 (4)

Harvey Johnston (born 18 August 2005) is an Australian rules footballer who played for the West Coast Eagles in the Australian Football League (AFL).

Originally from Melbourne, Johnston played his early football for the Mordialloc Braeside JFC, and later with the Parkdale Vultures. He vice-captained the Sandringham Dragons in the Talent League and represented Vic Metro at the 2023 under-18s national championships prior to joining the Eagles.

Johnston was with the West Coast Eagles from 2024 to 2026, after being selected with pick 49 of the 2023 national draft. He made six appearances during the 2024 AFL season, debuting against Essendon at Perth Stadium. Restricted to the WAFL in 2025, Johnston returned to the AFL side in the 2026 season as a forward, playing eight league fixtures. He was delisted at the end of the season.
