= Lachlan Cowan =

Personal information
- Born: 1 December 2004 (age 21)
- Original team: Devonport/Tasmania Devils (U18)
- Draft: No. 30, 2022 national draft
- Height: 188 cm (6 ft 2 in)
- Weight: 82 kg (181 lb)
- Position: Defender

Club information
- Current club: Carlton
- Number: 2

Playing career^{1}
Years	Club	Games (Goals)
2023–	Carlton	62 (2)
- ^{1} Playing statistics correct to the end of the 2026 season.

Career highlights
- Morrish Medal: 2022

Lachlan Cowan (born 1 December 2004) is an Australian rules footballer who plays for the Carlton Football Club in the Australian Football League (AFL).

A Devonport product, Cowan was co-captain of the Tasmania Devils under-18s team and earned a Morrish Medal for his performance in the 2022 NAB League Boys season.

Cowan was selected by Carlton with the 30th selection of the 2022 National Draft. Debuting in the opening round of the 2023 AFL season, Cowan has been used across half back in his appearances for Carlton.

== Statistics ==
Updated to the end of the 2026 season.

Legend
G	Goals	K	Kicks	D	Disposals	T	Tackles
B	Behinds	H	Handballs	M	Marks

Season	Team	No.	Games	Totals							Averages (per game)							Votes
Season	Team	No.	Games	G	B	K	H	D	M	T	G	B	K	H	D	M	T	Votes
2023	Carlton	26	7	0	0	49	20	69	20	13	0.0	0.0	7.0	2.9	9.9	2.9	1.9	0
2024	Carlton	2	17	1	1	139	72	211	66	50	0.1	0.1	8.2	4.2	12.4	3.9	2.9	0
2025	Carlton	2	14	1	0	144	59	203	68	35	0.1	0.0	10.3	4.2	14.5	4.9	2.5	0
2026	Carlton	2	24	0	0	257	116	373	131	47	0.0	0.0	10.7	4.8	15.5	5.5	2.0	0
Career			62	2	1	589	267	856	285	145	0.0	0.0	9.5	4.3	13.8	4.6	2.3	0
