= Jordan Croft =

Australian rules footballer (born 2005)

Personal information
- Born: 12 May 2005 (age 21)
- Original team: Maribyrnong Park
- Draft: No. 15 (F/S), 2023 national draft
- Height: 201 cm (6 ft 7 in)
- Weight: 81 kg (179 lb)
- Position: Key forward

Club information
- Current club: Western Bulldogs
- Number: 16

Playing career
Years	Club	Games (Goals)
2025–	Western Bulldogs	19 (17)

Jordan Croft (born 12 May 2005) is an Australian rules footballer who plays for the Western Bulldogs in the Australian Football League (AFL).

== Early life ==
Croft is a son of former Bulldogs player Matthew Croft and has two siblings. His twin brother, Mitch, is a volleyball player. He was educated at Maribyrnong College and played junior football for Maribyrnong Park.

A key forward, Croft kicked 23 goals for the Calder Cannons in the 2023 Talent League and was named at centre half forward in the "Team of the Year". He registered the fourth best time for the 2km time trial during the AFL Draft Combine and prior to the 2023 national draft nominated as a father-son selection. The Western Bulldogs secured Croft with pick 15, having matched a bid from the Sydney Swans.

== AFL career ==
Croft spent his first season with the Bulldogs in the VFL, making 10 reserves appearances in 2024. After showing good form late in the VFL season, Croft featured in the final two rounds of the 2025 AFL season for the Bulldogs, kicking two goals on debut in a win over the West Coast Eagles at Docklands. He finished the 2025 season by playing in Footscray's VFL premiership-winning team. In 2026, Croft signed a three-year contract extension to the end of the 2029, and gained regular AFL selection throughout the year, kicking 13 goals from 17 games.
