= Arie Schoenmaker =

Australian rules footballer

Personal information
- Born: 7 January 2005 (age 21)
- Original team: Launceston/Tasmania Devils
- Draft: No. 62, 2023 national draft
- Debut: 14 June 2024, St Kilda vs. Brisbane Lions, at The Gabba
- Height: 197 cm (6 ft 6 in)
- Weight: 91 kg (201 lb)
- Position: Key defender

Playing career
Years	Club	Games (Goals)
2024–2025	St Kilda	7 (0)

Arie Schoenmaker (born 7 January 2005) is a former Australian rules footballer who played for the St Kilda Football Club in the Australian Football League (AFL).

== Career ==
=== Early career ===
Before being drafted to the AFL, Schoenmaker played for Tasmania Devils in the Talent League. Ahead of the 2023 season, he was suspended from the club for 10 matches after bringing his teammates alcohol during a pre-season camp.

=== AFL ===
Schoenmaker was drafted by St Kilda with their final pick in the 2023 AFL draft, at pick 62 overall.

During the AFL pre-season on 1 February 2024, it was announced that he would spend one night a week training with St Kilda's Victorian Football League (VFL) reserves team, Sandringham, in order to work on "bridging his professional standards". He made his debut for Sandringham in round 1 of the 2024 VFL season.

Schoenmaker made his AFL debut in round 14 of the 2024 season against the Brisbane Lions.

Schoenmaker was delisted at the end of the 2025 AFL season, after seven games across his two seasons at the Saints.

== Statistics ==
Legend
G	Goals	K	Kicks	D	Disposals	T	Tackles
B	Behinds	H	Handballs	M	Marks

Season	Team	No.	Games	Totals							Averages (per game)							Votes
Season	Team	No.	Games	G	B	K	H	D	M	T	G	B	K	H	D	M	T	Votes
2024	St Kilda	27	4	0	0	47	11	58	20	4	0.0	0.0	11.8	2.8	14.5	5.0	1.0	0
2025	St Kilda	27	3	0	0	38	10	48	16	0	0.0	0.0	12.7	3.3	16.0	5.3	0.0	0
Career			7	0	0	85	21	106	36	4	0.0	0.0	12.1	3.0	15.1	5.1	0.6	0
