= Matthew Croft =

Australian rules footballer, born 1973

Personal information
- Born: 26 February 1973 (age 53); Morkalla
- Original team: Imperials
- Debut: Round 19, 1991, Footscray vs. Fitzroy, at Western Oval
- Height: 191 cm (6 ft 3 in)
- Weight: 94 kg (207 lb)

Playing career^{1}
Years	Club	Games (Goals)
1991–2004	Western Bulldogs	186 (72)
- ^{1} Playing statistics correct to the end of 2004.

Matthew Croft (born 26 February 1973) is a former Australian rules footballer in the Australian Football League.

He had a long career with the Western Bulldogs before retiring in 2004. The balding Croft only received three senior appearances with the team in his final year, much to his dismay, as he was performing admirably in the VFL in defence with the Werribee Tigers. The Bulldogs agreed to allow him and fellow veteran Simon Garlick one final appearance in the Round 21 game against the Kangaroos, in which Croft booted 5 goals up forward, in a matchwinning performance.

He polled 13 Brownlow medal votes in his career.

== Personal ==
In the 2023 AFL draft, his son Jordan was selected by the Western Bulldogs under the father-son rule and made his AFL debut against the West Coast Eagles on 17 August 2025 at Marvel Stadium.
