= Adam Kennedy (footballer) =

Australian rules footballer

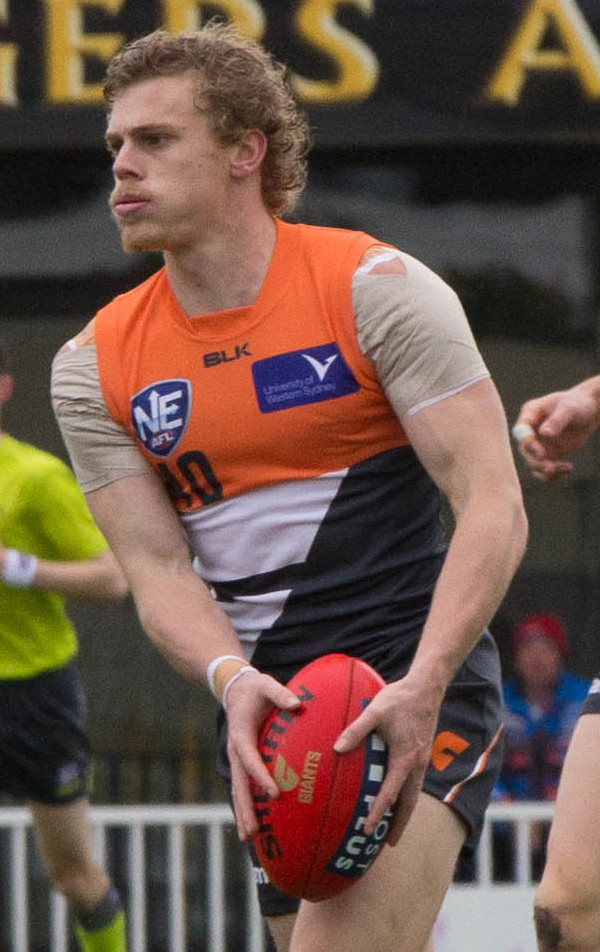
- Kennedy playing for the University of Western Sydney in August 2015

Personal information
- Full name: Adam Kennedy
- Born: 12 July 1992 (age 34)
- Original team: Western Jets (TAC Cup)
- Draft: Pre selection 2011 (GWS); No. 14, 2024 rookie draft (GWS)
- Height: 184 cm (6 ft 0 in)
- Weight: 80 kg (176 lb)
- Position: Midfielder

Playing career^{1}
Years	Club	Games (Goals)
2012–2024	Greater Western Sydney	153 (14)
- ^{1} Playing statistics correct to the end of 2024.

Career highlights
- Inaugural Greater Western Sydney team; NEAFL Premiership Player: 2016

Adam Kennedy (born 12 July 1992) is a former professional Australian rules footballer who played for the Greater Western Sydney Giants in the Australian Football League (AFL).

He was recruited from the Western Jets in the TAC Cup prior to the 2011 AFL draft as one of the new club's selections of players who had previously nominated for the draft. Kennedy made his AFL debut in Round 1 of the 2012 AFL season against Sydney in the Giants first ever game. Adam was in the game when GWS NEAFL team won the Grand Final in 2016.

Kennedy endured an AFL career with several injuries, undergoing a knee reconstruction on his left knee in 2017 and then requiring a shoulder reconstruction in 2021. On 22 April 2023 Kennedy was ruled out for the remainder of the 2023 season after rupturing the ACL in his right knee during the 21-point loss to the Brisbane Lions at Manuka Oval.

== Statistics ==
Statistics are correct to the 2024 season

Legend
G	Goals	K	Kicks	D	Disposals	T	Tackles
B	Behinds	H	Handballs	M	Marks

Season	Team	No.	Games	Totals							Averages (per game)						
Season	Team	No.	Games	G	B	K	H	D	M	T	G	B	K	H	D	M	T
2012	Greater Western Sydney	40	15	0	1	101	106	207	51	27	0.0	0.1	6.7	7.1	13.8	3.4	1.8
2013	Greater Western Sydney	40	19	1	1	139	121	260	71	35	0.1	0.1	7.3	6.4	13.7	3.7	1.8
2014	Greater Western Sydney	40	20	3	2	180	148	328	97	39	0.2	0.1	9.0	7.4	16.4	4.9	2.0
2015	Greater Western Sydney	40	7	0	0	56	49	105	35	6	0.0	0.0	8.0	7.0	15.0	5.0	0.9
2016	Greater Western Sydney	40	15	2	1	120	95	215	70	20	0.1	0.1	8.0	6.3	14.3	4.7	1.3
2017	Greater Western Sydney	40	7	0	0	44	47	91	26	18	0.0	0.0	6.3	6.7	13.0	3.7	2.6
2018	Greater Western Sydney	40	9	2	0	95	55	150	49	20	0.2	0.0	10.6	6.1	16.7	5.4	2.2
2019	Greater Western Sydney	40	23	4	1	238	131	369	112	43	0.2	0.0	10.3	5.7	16.0	4.9	1.9
2020 (Note: The 2020 season was played with 17 home-and-away matches per team (down from 22) and 16-minute quarters with time on (down from 20-minute quarters with time on) due to the impact of the COVID-19 pandemic.)	Greater Western Sydney	40	6	0	0	36	32	68	11	12	0.0	0.0	6.0	5.3	11.3	1.8	2.0
2021	Greater Western Sydney	40	9	1	1	72	59	131	35	21	0.1	0.1	8.0	6.6	14.6	3.9	2.3
2022	Greater Western Sydney	40	18	1	0	172	86	258	97	22	0.1	0.0	9.6	4.8	14.3	5.4	1.2
2023	Greater Western Sydney	40	5	0	0	22	14	36	8	5	0.0	0.0	4.4	2.8	7.2	1.6	1.0
2024	Greater Western Sydney	40	0	–	–	–	–	–	–	–	–	–	–	–	–	–	–
Career			153	14	7	1275	943	2218	662	268	0.1	0.0	8.3	6.2	14.5	4.3	1.8
