= Zane Zakostelsky =

Personal information
- Born: 14 December 2005 (age 20)
- Original teams: Claremont (WAFL); North Beach Junior Football Club
- Draft: No. 51, 2023 AFL draft
- Debut: Opening Round, 2026, Brisbane Lions vs. Western Bulldogs, at the Gabba
- Height: 196 cm (6 ft 5 in)
- Position: Ruckman/Key Defender

Club information
- Current club: Brisbane Lions
- Number: 21

Playing career^{1}
Years	Club	Games (Goals)
2024–	Brisbane Lions	3 (1)
- ^{1} Playing statistics correct to the end of round 22, 2026.

Zane Zakostelsky (born 14 December 2005) is a professional Australian rules footballer who plays for the Brisbane Lions in the Australian Football League (AFL).

== Early life ==
Zakostelsky attended school at Sacred Heart College, Sorrento. He was a Fremantle fan growing up.

== Junior career ==
Zakostelsky played junior football as a ruckman with the North Beach Junior football club. He also played basketball, representing Perry Lakes in the NBL1 West.

Zakostelsky joined Claremont in the WAFL Colts at the age of 17. He was named best afield in the WAFL Colts Grand Final. He also played two games for Western Australia in the Under 18 Championships.

== AFL career ==
Zakostelsky was drafted by the Brisbane Lions with pick 51 of the 2023 AFL draft. It was announced that he would make his debut in Opening Round of the 2026 AFL season. His debut made him the first ever player to have the letter "Z" as the initial of both his first name and his surname.

== Statistics ==
Updated to the end of round 22, 2026.

Legend
G	Goals	K	Kicks	D	Disposals	T	Tackles
B	Behinds	H	Handballs	M	Marks	H/O	Hit-outs

Season	Team	No.	Games	Totals								Averages (per game)								Votes
Season	Team	No.	Games	G	B	K	H	D	M	T	H/O	G	B	K	H	D	M	T	H/O	Votes
2024	Brisbane Lions	21	0	—	—	—	—	—	—	—	—	—	—	—	—	—	—	—	—	0
2025	Brisbane Lions	21	0	—	—	—	—	—	—	—	—	—	—	—	—	—	—	—	—	0
2026	Brisbane Lions	21	3	1	0	16	6	22	12	5	20	0.3	0.0	5.3	2.0	7.3	4.0	1.7	6.7	0
Career			3	1	0	16	6	22	12	5	20	0.3	0.0	5.3	2.0	7.3	4.0	1.7	6.7	0
