= Calsher Dear =

Australian rules footballer (born 2005)

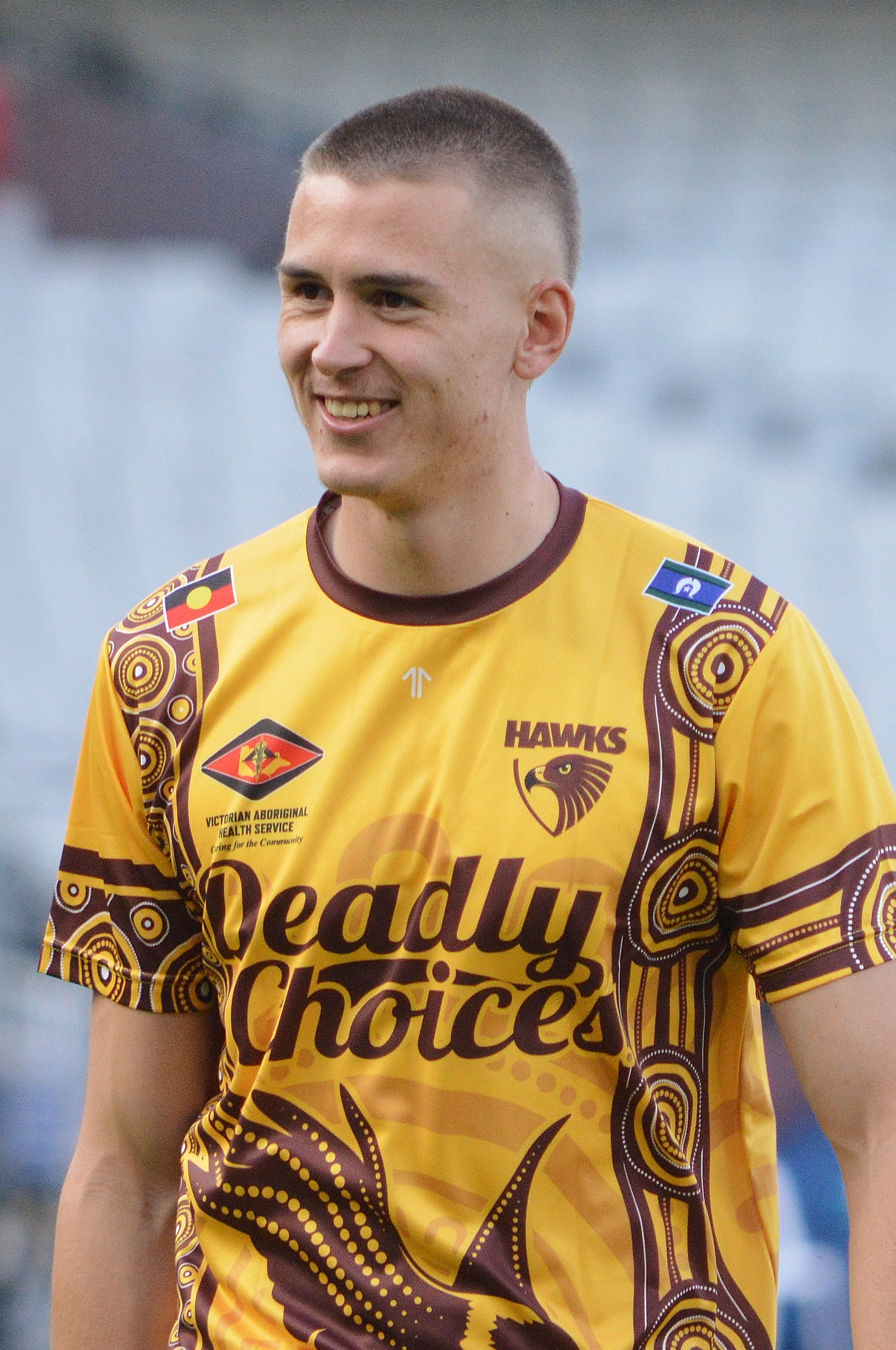
- Dear in May 2026

Personal information
- Full name: Calsher Dear
- Born: 4 August 2005 (age 21)
- Original team: Sandringham Dragons (NAB League)/Beaumaris
- Draft: No. 56 (F/S), 2023 AFL draft, Hawthorn
- Debut: Round 8, 2024, Hawthorn vs. Western Bulldogs, at Marvel
- Height: 195 cm (6 ft 5 in)
- Weight: 88 kg (194 lb)
- Position: Key Forward

Club information
- Current club: Hawthorn
- Number: 13

Playing career^{1}
Years	Club	Games (Goals)
2024–	Hawthorn	31 (39)
- ^{1} Playing statistics correct to the end of 2026.

Career highlights
- VFL premiership player: 2026; AFL Rising Star nomination: 2024

Calsher Dear (born 4 August 2005) is an Australian rules footballer who plays for Hawthorn in the Australian Football League (AFL).

== Early career ==
The youngest of four siblings, Dear played with the Beaumaris Football Club as a junior. By his own admission, it took time to adjust to the tempo with the Sandringham Dragons in the Talent League. He was one of the best players for the Dragons throughout the 2023 finals series, with his Grand Final performance particularly eye-catching. Dear attended St Bede's College, which competes in the ACC.

== AFL career ==
Dear was drafted by Hawthorn with pick 56 in the 2023 AFL draft. He made his debut against Western Bulldogs at the Marvel Stadium in round 8 of the 2024 AFL season, kicking two goals in a win. Dear would turn out to be a key player for Hawthorn throughout 2024, playing seventeen times and kicking 25 goals.

2025 was marred by injury for Dear, only playing nine games. Nonetheless, he still won Hawthorn's Most Promising Player Award.

Before the start of the 2026 season, teammate Dylan Moore changed his guernsey number to 8. This allowed Dear to wear the number 13, which his late father Paul wore 123 times for the Hawks. Throughout 2026, Dear was constantly overlooked by Sam Mitchell, only featuring five times at AFL level. Unable to lock down a spot in the Hawks AFL team, Dear spent the majority of 2026 playing for the Box Hill Hawks, Hawthorn's VFL-affiliated side. Dear kicked 22 goals in fifteen games with Box Hill throughout 2026, including two goals in the VFL Grand Final, which Box Hill won against Geelong.

After only playing fourteen AFL games in two years, Dear was linked with a move away from Hawthorn, with multiple rival clubs reportedly showing interest in signing him. However, Dear put these rumours to rest on October 2, 2026, signing a contract extension with Hawthorn until the end of the 2028 season.

== Family ==
Calsher is the son of Paul Dear, Norm Smith Medallist and 1991 Hawthorn premiership player. His eldest brother, Harry, was drafted by Adelaide in the 2014 AFL draft. He is the nephew of Greg Dear, a triple premiership player for Hawthorn in 1986, 1988 & 1989.

In 2025, his sister, Maya, was drafted by Hawthorn as the club's first-ever father-daughter signing.

== Statistics ==
Updated to the end of 2026.

Legend
G	Goals	K	Kicks	D	Disposals	T	Tackles
B	Behinds	H	Handballs	M	Marks

Season	Team	No.	Games	Totals							Averages (per game)							Votes
Season	Team	No.	Games	G	B	K	H	D	M	T	G	B	K	H	D	M	T	Votes
2024	Hawthorn	35	17	25	11	67	52	119	46	42	1.5	0.6	3.9	3.1	7.0	2.7	2.5	0
2025	Hawthorn	35	9	10	9	38	28	66	21	16	1.1	1.0	4.2	3.1	7.3	2.3	1.8	0
2026	Hawthorn	13	5	4	5	27	18	45	18	13	0.8	1.0	5.4	3.6	9.0	3.6	2.6	0
Career			31	39	25	132	98	230	85	71	1.3	0.8	4.3	3.2	7.4	2.7	2.3	0

== Honours and achievements ==
Team

- McClelland Trophy (Hawthorn): 2024
- VFL premiership player (Box Hill): 2026

Individual

- AFL Rising Star nominee: 2024
