= Kynan Brown =

Australian rules footballer

Personal information
- Full name: Kynan Brown
- Born: 13 January 2005 (age 21)
- Original teams: Blackburn, Old Geelong
- Draft: No. 22 (F/S), 2023 rookie draft
- Debut: Round 15, 2024, Melbourne vs. North Melbourne, at MCG
- Height: 181 cm (5 ft 11 in)
- Weight: 71 kg (157 lb)
- Position: Midfield

Playing career
Years	Club	Games (Goals)
2024–2025	Melbourne	2 (0)

Kynan Brown (born 13 January 2005) is a former professional Australian rules footballer who played for the Melbourne Football Club in the Australian Football League (AFL). Brown is the son of former Melbourne player Nathan Brown. He made his debut in the 3-point win against North Melbourne at the Melbourne Cricket Ground in Round 15 of the 2024 season, in which he was substituted into the game in the fourth quarter and laid a match-saving tackle.

Brown was delisted by Melbourne after 2 seasons in which he played two AFL matches.

== Statistics ==
Legend
G	Goals	K	Kicks	D	Disposals	T	Tackles
B	Behinds	H	Handballs	M	Marks

Season	Team	No.	Games	Totals							Averages (per game)							Votes
Season	Team	No.	Games	G	B	K	H	D	M	T	G	B	K	H	D	M	T	Votes
2024	Melbourne	41	2	0	0	2	1	3	0	2	0.0	0.0	1.0	0.5	1.5	0.0	1.0	0
2025	Melbourne	41	0	—	—	—	—	—	—	—	—	—	—	—	—	—	—	0
Career			2	0	0	2	1	3	0	2	0.0	0.0	1.0	0.5	1.5	0.0	1.0	0
