= Dante Visentini =

Australian rules footballer

Personal information
- Nickname: Vis
- Born: 13 February 2003 (age 23)
- Original teams: Sandringham Dragons (Talent League); Brighton Beach (SMJFL) St Kilda City (SMJFL)
- Draft: No. 56, 2024 national draft
- Debut: Round 16, 2023, Port Adelaide vs. Essendon, at MCG
- Height: 202 cm (6 ft 8 in)
- Weight: 98 kg (216 lb)

Club information
- Current club: Port Adelaide
- Number: 38

Playing career^{1}
Years	Club	Games (Goals)
2023–	Port Adelaide	29 (8)
- ^{1} Playing statistics correct to the end of 2026.

Dante Visentini (born 13 February 2003) is a professional Australian rules footballer with the Port Adelaide Football Club in the Australian Football League (AFL).

== Junior career ==
Raised in Melbourne, Victoria, Visentini played for Brighton Beach Junior Football Club and the St Kilda City Football Club in the South Metro Junior Football League. Growing up, he supported the Richmond Tigers.

He spent his draft year playing for the Sandringham Dragons in the Talent League and Vic Metro in the under-18 national championships, while also attending school and playing school football at Xavier College.

In his draft year of 2021, Visentini quit his job at an Italian restaurant to focus on football.

== AFL career ==
Visentini was drafted by Port Adelaide with the 56th overall pick in the 2021 national draft, joining schoolmate and Dragons teammate Josh Sinn at the Power.

Visentini debuted in the round 16, 2023 match against Essendon at the MCG in which Dan Houston kicked a goal after the siren to win the match. He fought for his spot against rucks Scott Lycett and Sam Hayes but only managed three games for the season.

In 2026, Visentini found his place in Port Adelaide's team, with the extended bench allowing for teams to play several ruckmen. He struck a ruck partnership with first-choice Jordon Sweet.

== Personal life ==
Visentini's younger brother, Vigo, also plays in the AFL, for Essendon. The pair come from an Italian-Australian background.

As of 2025, Visentini lives with teammates Lachie Jones and Jack Whitlock.

== Statistics ==
Updated to the end of round 22, 2026.

Legend
G	Goals	K	Kicks	D	Disposals	T	Tackles
B	Behinds	H	Handballs	M	Marks	H/O	Hit-outs

Season	Team	No.	Games	Totals								Averages (per game)								Votes
Season	Team	No.	Games	G	B	K	H	D	M	T	H/O	G	B	K	H	D	M	T	H/O	Votes
2022	Port Adelaide	38	0	—	—	—	—	—	—	—	—	—	—	—	—	—	—	—	—	0
2023	Port Adelaide	38	3	0	0	10	12	22	2	7	51	0.0	0.0	3.3	4.0	7.3	0.7	2.3	17.0	0
2024	Port Adelaide	38	3	1	0	10	12	22	4	10	71	0.3	0.0	3.3	4.0	7.3	1.3	3.3	23.7	0
2025	Port Adelaide	38	8	1	5	27	42	69	13	22	172	0.1	0.6	3.4	5.3	8.6	1.6	2.8	21.5	0
2026	Port Adelaide	38	13	6	0	41	45	86	26	24	175	0.5	0.0	3.2	3.5	6.6	2.0	1.8	13.5	0
Career			27	8	5	88	111	199	45	63	469	0.3	0.2	3.3	4.1	7.4	1.7	2.3	17.4	0
