= Matt Carroll (footballer) =

Australian rules footballer (born 2005)

Personal information
- Nickname: Jeff
- Born: 28 November 2005 (age 20)
- Original team: Sandringham Dragons
- Draft: No. 15, 2024 rookie draft
- Debut: Round 5, 2025, Carlton vs. West Coast, at Adelaide Oval
- Height: 190 cm (6 ft 3 in)
- Position: Wing

Club information
- Current club: Carlton
- Number: 32

Playing career^{1}
Years	Club	Games (Goals)
2024–	Carlton	27 (10)
- ^{1} Playing statistics correct to the end of round 22, 2026.

Career highlights
- AFL Rising Star nominee: 2025

Matthew Carroll (born 28 November 2005) is an Australian rules footballer who plays for the Carlton Football Club in the Australian Football League (AFL).

== Junior career ==
Carroll represented the Sandringham Dragons in the Talent League. Averaging 10.3 disposals, he played four games in 2023, including the winning Grand Final. Carroll also played for Vic Metro in the Under 18 Championships, averaging 13.3 disposals.

== AFL career ==
Carroll was selected by Carlton with pick 15 of the 2024 rookie draft. He was injured for much of the 2024 AFL season with a groin injury and did not play football at any level in his first year.

Following the conclusion of the 2024 season, Carroll was delisted by Carlton, but given the opportunity to continue training with the club for a chance to be selected during the 2025 pre-season supplemental selection period. He was able to earn back a spot on Carlton's list, and made his VFL debut against Southport in round 3 of the VFL season.

After impressing on VFL debut, having 17 disposals, Carroll was selected to make his AFL debut against the West Coast Eagles in round 5 of the 2025 AFL season. He had 12 disposals and 8 marks on debut.

In July 2025, Carroll signed a contract extension to the end of 2027.

In round 24 of the 2025 AFL season, Carroll had 15 disposals to earn himself a nomination for the 2025 AFL rising star.

In round 11 of the 2026 AFL season, Carroll ruptured his ACL, ruling him out for the remainder of the season.

== Statistics ==
Updated to the end of round 22, 2026.

Legend
G	Goals	K	Kicks	D	Disposals	T	Tackles
B	Behinds	H	Handballs	M	Marks

Season	Team	No.	Games	Totals							Averages (per game)							Votes
Season	Team	No.	Games	G	B	K	H	D	M	T	G	B	K	H	D	M	T	Votes
2024	Carlton	32	0	—	—	—	—	—	—	—	—	—	—	—	—	—	—	0
2025	Carlton	32	17	1	2	155	50	205	65	25	0.1	0.1	9.1	2.9	12.1	3.8	1.5	0
2026	Carlton	32	10	9	2	92	48	140	43	8	0.9	0.2	9.2	4.8	14.0	4.3	0.8	0
Career			27	10	4	247	98	345	108	33	0.4	0.1	9.1	3.6	12.8	4.0	1.2	0
