= Greg Dear =

Australian rules footballer

Personal information
- Born: 17 April 1963 (age 63)
- Original team: Churchill
- Height: 200 cm (6 ft 7 in)
- Weight: 99 kg (218 lb)
- Position: Ruck

Playing career^{1}
Years	Club	Games (Goals)
1985–1993	Hawthorn	137 (18)
1994–1996	Richmond	53 (9)
Total		190 (27)
- ^{1} Playing statistics correct to the end of 1996.

Career highlights
- 3x VFL Premiership (1986, 1988, 1989)

Greg Dear (born 17 April 1963) is a former Australian rules footballer who played for Hawthorn and Richmond in the VFL/AFL.

A ruckman, Dear was a member of the strong Hawthorn sides of the late 1980s and a premiership player in 1986, 1988 and 1989. He could have had a fourth in 1991 but missed the entire season due to a serious knee injury. In 1994 he was traded to Richmond where he finished his career.

Dear had joined the senior Hawthorn side in 1985 after impressing in the reserve grade, winning the Gardiner Medal for the league's best reserve player. The following season he was selected in the VFL Team of the Year as first ruckman and he later went on to represent Victoria in interstae football.

Greg Dear is the brother of fellow Hawk Paul Dear and the uncle of current Hawthorn players Calsher Dear and Maya Dear.
