= Loch Rawlinson =

Australian rules footballer (born 2005)

Personal information
- Born: 1 June 2005 (age 21)
- Original team: Mt Lofty Devils/Mitcham
- Draft: No. 1, 2023 rookie draft
- Height: 177 cm (5 ft 10 in)
- Weight: 72 kg (159 lb)
- Position: Forward

Club information
- Current club: Sturt

Playing career
Years	Club	Games (Goals)
2024–25	West Coast Eagles	1 (0)

Loch Rawlinson (born 1 June 2005) is an Australian rules footballer who played for the West Coast Eagles in the Australian Football League (AFL).

Raised in the Adelaide Hills, Rawlinson played his early football for the Mt Lofty Devils and later with Mitcham. He represented South Australia at the 2023 under-18s National Championships and played in the juniors for Sturt prior to being secured by the West Coast Eagles with the first pick of the 2023 rookie draft.

Rawlinson, a small forward, spent two seasons with the Eagles. After kicking three goals on his WAFL debut in 2024, Rawlinson was selected to make his AFL debut in round five's Gather Round fixture against the Sydney Swans in Mount Barker, not far from where he grew up. This remained his only AFL appearance, and after being restricted to the WAFL in 2025, Rawlinson was delisted by the Eagles and returned to Sturt.
