= Jack Mahony (footballer) =

Australian football league player

Personal information
- Nickname: Yah Yahs Mahony
- Born: 12 November 2001 (age 24); Melbourne, Victoria
- Draft: No. 34, 2019 AFL draft (North Melbourne); No. 23, 2024 rookie draft (Gold Coast)
- Debut: 28 June 2020, North Melbourne vs. Hawthorn, at Marvel Stadium
- Height: 178 cm (5 ft 10 in)
- Weight: 72 kg (159 lb)
- Position: Forward

Playing career^{1}
Years	Club	Games (Goals)
2020–2023	North Melbourne	44 (18)
2024	Gold Coast	0 (0)
Total		44 (18)
- ^{1} Playing statistics correct to the end of 2024.

Jack Mahony (born 12 November 2001) is an Australian rules footballer who last played for the Gold Coast Suns in the Australian Football League (AFL). He was recruited by North Melbourne with the 34th pick in the 2019 AFL draft.

== Early football ==
Mahony played football for the Sandringham Dragons in the NAB League for two seasons. He also played for Vic Metro in the AFL Under 18 Championships for two seasons, as well as for his school side at St Kevin's College, Melbourne.

== AFL career ==
Mahony debuted in North Melbourne's four point loss against the Hawthorn Hawks in the fourth round of the 2020 AFL season. He collected 8 disposals and one tackle on debut.

Mahony was delisted from the North Melbourne Football Club in October 2023, but was subsequently drafted by Gold Coast as a rookie. He was delisted by the Suns at the end of the 2024 season.

== Statistics ==
Statistics are correct to the end of 2024

Legend
G	Goals	K	Kicks	D	Disposals	T	Tackles
B	Behinds	H	Handballs	M	Marks

Season	Team	No.	Games	Totals							Averages (per game)						
Season	Team	No.	Games	G	B	K	H	D	M	T	G	B	K	H	D	M	T
2020 (Note: The 2020 season was played with 17 home-and-away matches per team (down from 22) and 16-minute quarters with time on (down from 20-minute quarters with time on) due to the impact of the COVID-19 pandemic.)	North Melbourne	35	10	3	2	28	56	84	12	26	0.3	0.2	2.8	5.6	8.4	1.2	2.6
2021	North Melbourne	1	19	9	4	116	104	220	53	61	0.5	0.2	6.1	5.5	11.6	2.8	3.2
2022	North Melbourne	1	13	6	1	68	41	109	33	30	0.5	0.1	5.2	3.2	8.4	2.5	2.3
2023	North Melbourne	1	2	0	0	12	13	25	8	3	0.0	0.0	6.0	6.5	12.5	4.0	1.5
2024	Gold Coast	42	0	–	–	–	–	–	–	–	–	–	–	–	–	–	–
Career			44	18	7	224	213	437	106	120	0.4	0.2	5.1	4.8	9.9	2.4	2.7
