= Vigo Visentini =

Australian rules footballer

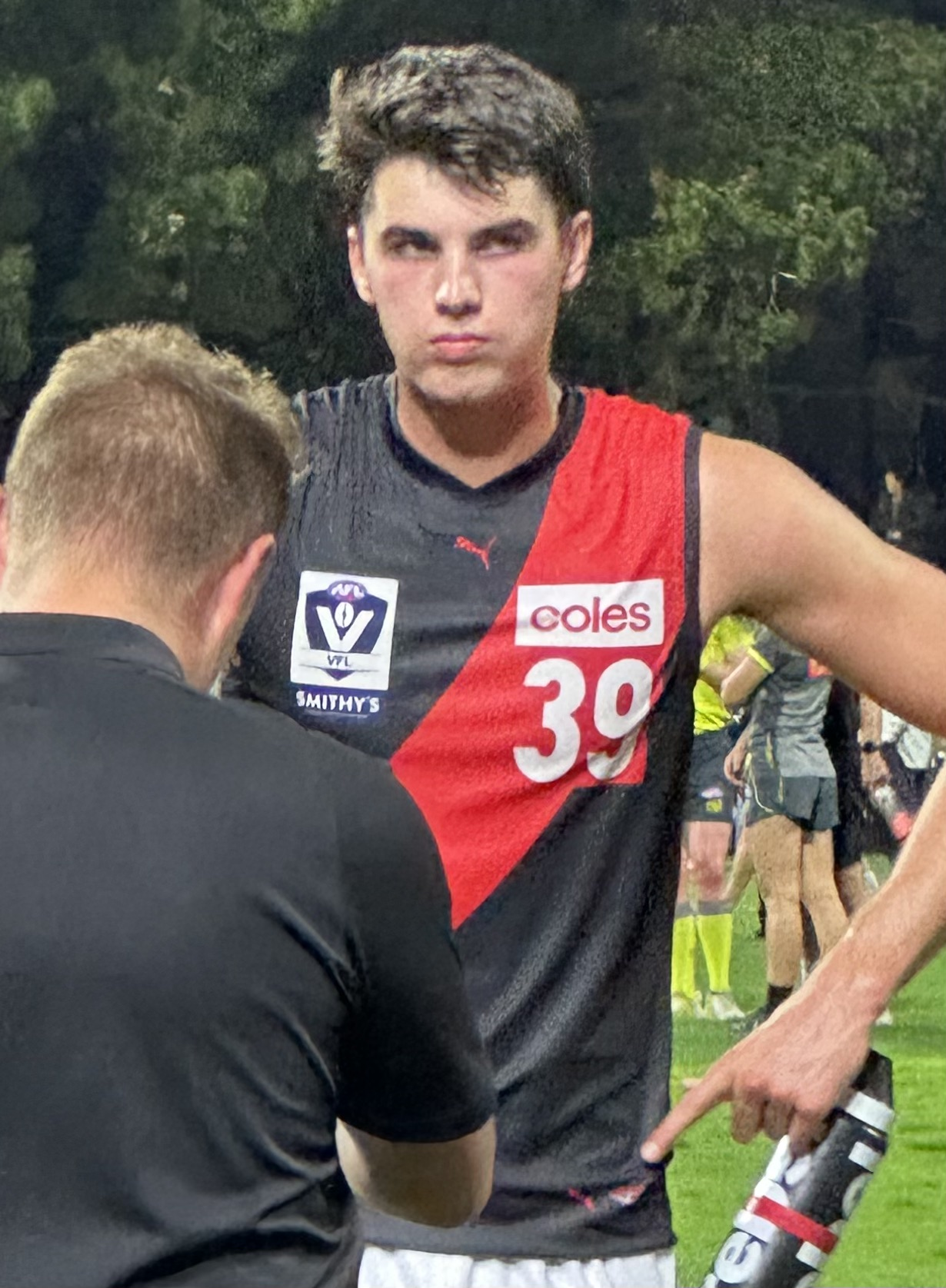
- Visentini in April 2025

Personal information
- Born: 5 September 2005 (age 21)
- Original team: Sandringham Dragons (Talent League)
- Draft: No. 8, 2024 rookie draft
- Debut: Round 15, 2025, Essendon vs. Fremantle, at Perth Stadium
- Height: 203 cm (6 ft 8 in)

Club information
- Current club: Essendon
- Number: 17

Playing career^{1}
Years	Club	Games (Goals)
2024–	Essendon	5 (1)
- ^{1} Playing statistics correct to the end of 2026.

Vigo Visentini (born 5 September 2005) is a professional Australian rules footballer with the Essendon Football Club in the Australian Football League (AFL).

== Junior career ==
Visentini spent his draft year playing for the Sandringham Dragons in the Talent League and Vic Metro in the U18 National Championships, while also attending school and playing school football at Xavier College. Visentini won the best & fairest at Xavier College, where he was coached by former Essendon captain and champion, Jobe Watson.

== AFL career ==
Visentini was drafted by Essendon in the 2023 rookie draft.

Visentini's first season at Essendon was spent developing while playing in the Victorian Football League (VFL) for Essendon's reserves team, with a highlight of his season being a three goal performance against Southport. Visentini signed a one-year contract extension to stay at the club for the 2025 AFL season.

In 2025, following season ending injuries to regular senior ruckmen, Sam Draper and Nick Bryan, Visentini was given the chance to make his AFL debut in Round 15 against Fremantle at Perth Stadium. Visentini impressed on his debut, coming up against Fremantle's star ruckman, Luke Jackson, and finishing the match with 17 hit outs, 4 clearances and a memorable tackle on Matthew Johnson.

Visentini's first game of 2026 came in a Round 22 defeat against the Geelong Cats, with the ruckman totalling 33 hitouts and 17 disposals. This was enough to retain selection in Round 23 in a loss against the Sydney Swans, where Visentini kicked his first AFL goal in another impressive performance, with 19 disposals, 14 hit-outs, 9 marks and 6 tackles.

== Personal life ==
Visentini's older brother, Dante, also plays in the AFL, playing for Port Adelaide.

== Statistics ==
Updated to the end of round 23, 2026.

Legend
G	Goals	K	Kicks	D	Disposals	T	Tackles
B	Behinds	H	Handballs	M	Marks

Season	Team	No.	Games	Totals							Averages (per game)							Votes
Season	Team	No.	Games	G	B	K	H	D	M	T	G	B	K	H	D	M	T	Votes
2025	Essendon	39	2	0	0	8	17	25	4	3	0.0	0.0	4.0	8.5	12.5	2.0	1.5	0
2026	Essendon	17	2	1	0	23	13	36	13	8	0.5	0.0	12.0	6.5	18.5	6.5	4.0	0
Career			3	0	0	18	24	42	8	5	0.0	0.0	6.0	8.0	14.0	2.7	1.7	0
