= Matt Flynn (Australian footballer) =

Australian rules footballer (born 1997)

Personal information
- Full name: Matthew Flynn
- Born: 13 September 1997 (age 29)
- Original team: NSW-ACT U18
- Draft: No. 41, 2015 national draft
- Height: 202 cm (6 ft 8 in)
- Weight: 107 kg (236 lb)
- Position: Ruck

Club information
- Current club: West Coast
- Number: 25

Playing career^{1}
Years	Club	Games (Goals)
2016–2023	Greater Western Sydney	33 (10)
2024–	West Coast	26 (8)
Total		59 (18)
- ^{1} Playing statistics correct to the end of round 22, 2026.

Matthew Flynn is an Australian rules footballer playing for the West Coast Eagles in the Australian Football League. Flynn debuted at the age of 23 in Round 1 of the 2021 AFL season.

== Early life and AFL career ==
Growing up in Narrandera in southern NSW, Flynn joined the Giants Academy at the age of 12. He was selected with pick 41 in the 2015 AFL draft as a developing ruckman. Flynn didn't make his AFL debut in his first five years at the club, missing an entire year after an ACL injury in July 2019. He then played 33 games from his debut in 2019, before he spent the end of the 2023 season playing in the VFL as the Giant's preferred Kieren Briggs as their first choice ruckman.

At the end of the 2023 AFL season, Flynn joined West Coast as a free agent. A hamstring injury during preseason delayed his debut for the Eagles until round 12 of the 2024 AFL season.

Flynn was also appointed as the ruck coach of the West Coast Eagles AFL Women's (AFLW) team ahead of the 2024 season.

== Statistics ==
Updated to the end of round 22, 2026.

Legend
G	Goals	K	Kicks	D	Disposals	T	Tackles
B	Behinds	H	Handballs	M	Marks	H/O	Hit-outs

Season	Team	No.	Games	Totals								Averages (per game)								Votes
Season	Team	No.	Games	G	B	K	H	D	M	T	H/O	G	B	K	H	D	M	T	H/O	Votes
2021	Greater Western Sydney	30	12	5	2	55	88	143	47	30	220	0.4	0.2	4.6	7.3	11.9	3.9	2.5	18.3	0
2022	Greater Western Sydney	30	12	4	1	61	69	130	33	25	306	0.3	0.1	5.1	5.8	10.8	2.8	2.1	25.5	0
2023	Greater Western Sydney	30	9	1	2	47	59	106	15	30	256	0.1	0.2	5.2	6.6	11.8	1.7	3.3	28.4	0
2024	West Coast	25	4	1	1	13	20	33	8	13	97	0.3	0.3	3.3	5.0	8.3	2.0	3.3	24.3	0
2025	West Coast	25	18	6	3	121	108	229	73	47	443	0.3	0.2	6.7	6.0	12.7	4.1	2.6	24.6	0
2026	West Coast	25	4	1	0	16	23	39	3	17	75	0.3	0.0	4.0	5.8	9.8	0.8	4.3	18.8	0
Career			59	18	9	313	367	680	179	162	1397	0.3	0.2	5.3	6.2	11.5	3.0	2.7	23.7	0
