= Will Setterfield =

Australian rules footballer (born 1998)

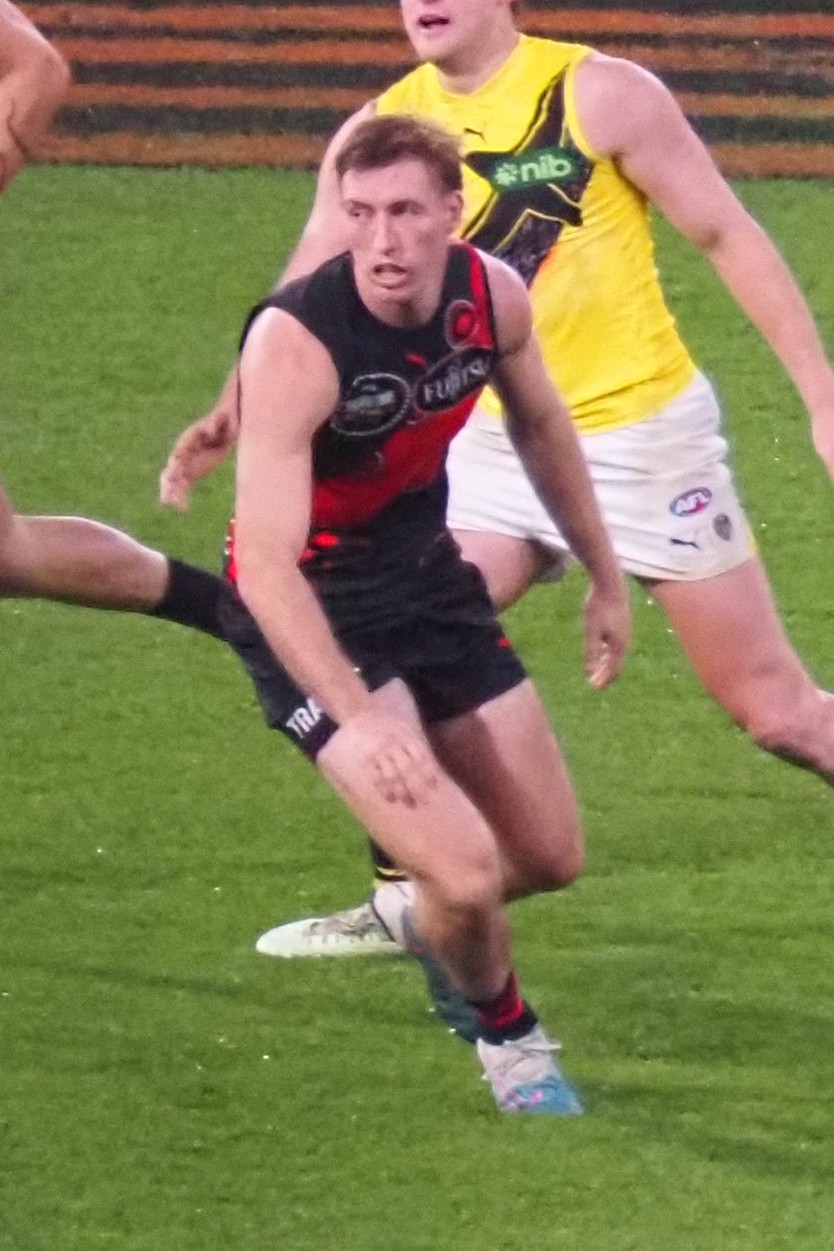
- Setterfield playing for Essendon in 2025

Personal information
- Full name: Will Setterfield
- Born: 5 February 1998 (age 28)
- Original team: Sandringham Dragons (TAC Cup)
- Draft: No. 5, 2016 national draft
- Debut: Round 18, 2017, Greater Western Sydney vs. Richmond, at the MCG
- Height: 192 cm (6 ft 4 in)
- Weight: 87 kg (192 lb)
- Position: Midfielder

Club information
- Current club: Essendon
- Number: 12

Playing career^{1}
Years	Club	Games (Goals)
2017–2018	Greater Western Sydney	2 (0)
2019–2022	Carlton	55 (12)
2023–	Essendon	36 (5)
Total		91 (17)
- ^{1} Playing statistics correct to the end of round 22, 2026.

Will Setterfield (born 5 February 1998) is a professional Australian rules footballer who plays for the Essendon Football Club in the Australian Football League (AFL). He was drafted by Greater Western Sydney with their second selection and fifth overall in the 2016 national draft, and was considered by the media to be one of the most complete midfielders in his draft year. He made his debut in the 19-point loss to Richmond at the Melbourne Cricket Ground in round 18 of the 2017 season. Setterfield also played for Carlton between 2019 and 2022.

== Early life ==
Setterfield grew up in Albury before taking up a boarding scholarship at Caulfield Grammar School in Melbourne. He played junior football for Albury Tigers.

== Playing career ==
At the conclusion of the 2018 AFL season, Setterfield requested a trade from GWS. Essendon and Carlton were considered to be front runners in obtaining his signature. Despite being an Essendon supporter as a child, Setterfield nominated the Carlton Football Club as his preferred home. He was traded on 12 October. Widely considered a bargain coup for Carlton, former player and assistant coach Matthew Lappin tweeted "Blues fans, get excited. I coached against Setterfield in his first NEAFL game and he is a serious player, on the way to the 'Baggers". Setterfield made his Carlton debut in the Round 1 match against Richmond at the MCG. He impressed, gathering an impressive 24 disposals in what was his first AFL game after his ACL injury in 2018.

After playing only 13 games in Carlton's promising 2022 season, Setterfield was traded to Essendon in that year's trade period.

== Personal life ==
Setterfield is cousins with Greater Western Sydney AFLW player Isabel Huntington.

== Statistics ==
Updated to the end of round 22, 2026.

Legend
G	Goals	K	Kicks	D	Disposals	T	Tackles
B	Behinds	H	Handballs	M	Marks

Season	Team	No.	Games	Totals							Averages (per game)							Votes
Season	Team	No.	Games	G	B	K	H	D	M	T	G	B	K	H	D	M	T	Votes
2017	Greater Western Sydney	11	2	0	2	12	6	18	5	10	0.0	1.0	6.0	3.0	9.0	2.5	5.0	0
2018	Greater Western Sydney	11	0	—	—	—	—	—	—	—	—	—	—	—	—	—	—	0
2019	Carlton	43	18	6	12	183	114	297	58	56	0.3	0.7	10.2	6.3	16.5	3.2	3.1	1
2020 (Note: The 2020 season was played with 17 home-and-away matches per team (down from 22) and 16-minute quarters with time on (down from 20-minute quarters with time on) due to the impact of the COVID-19 pandemic.)	Carlton	43	16	4	1	147	97	244	29	84	0.3	0.1	9.2	6.1	15.3	1.8	5.3	0
2021	Carlton	43	8	1	6	74	50	124	35	17	0.1	0.8	9.3	6.3	15.5	4.4	2.1	0
2022	Carlton	43	13	1	3	131	83	214	51	30	0.1	0.2	10.1	6.4	16.5	3.9	2.3	0
2023	Essendon	12	10	2	3	112	96	208	47	60	0.2	0.3	11.2	9.6	20.8	4.7	6.0	0
2024	Essendon	12	4	0	2	49	42	91	17	27	0.0	0.5	12.3	10.5	22.8	4.3	6.8	0
2025	Essendon	12	13	1	3	148	134	282	54	96	0.1	0.2	11.4	10.3	21.7	4.2	7.4	0
2026	Essendon	12	9	2	2	105	87	192	30	42	0.2	0.2	11.7	9.7	21.3	3.3	4.7	0
Career			93	17	34	961	709	1670	326	422	0.2	0.4	10.3	7.6	18.0	3.5	4.5	1
