= Griffin Logue =

Australian rules footballer

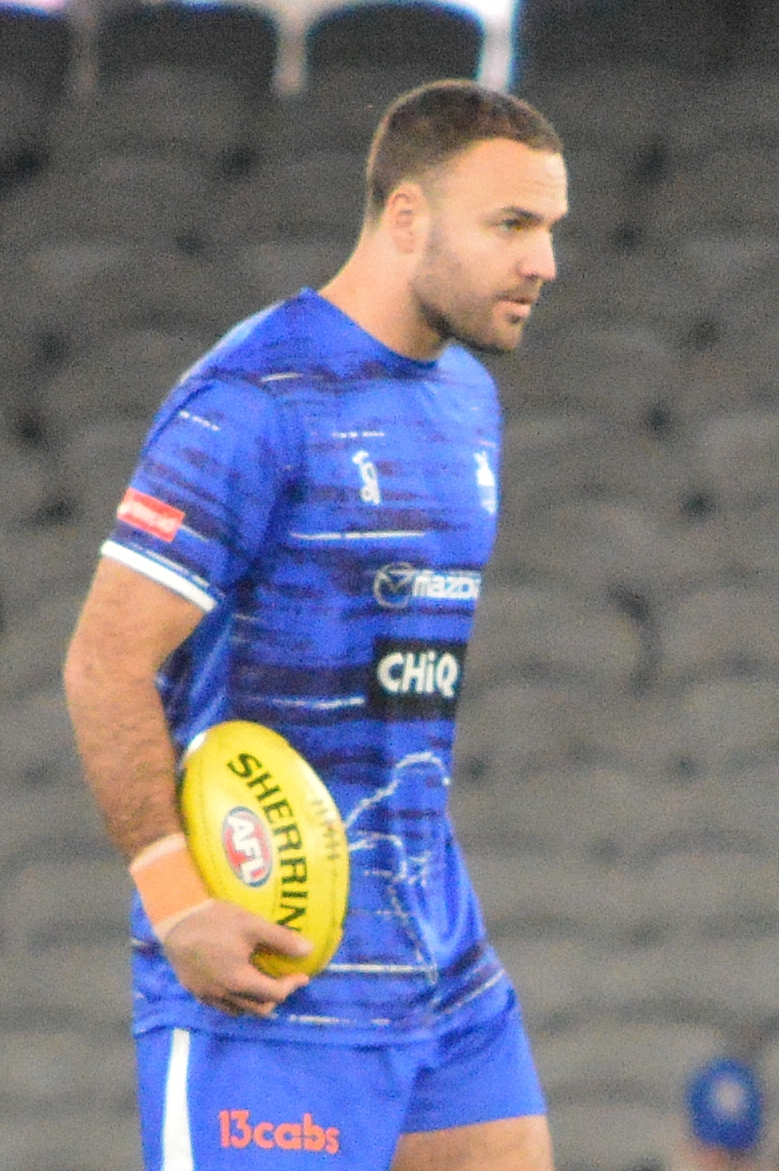
- Logue with North Melbourne in March 2026

Personal information
- Full name: Griffin Logue
- Born: 13 April 1998 (age 28)
- Original team: Swan Districts (WAFL)
- Draft: No. 8, 2016 national draft
- Debut: Round 3, 2017, Fremantle vs. Western Bulldogs, at Domain Stadium
- Height: 191 cm (6 ft 3 in)
- Weight: 95 kg (209 lb)
- Position: Key defender

Club information
- Current club: North Melbourne
- Number: 19

Playing career^{1}
Years	Club	Games (Goals)
2017–2022	Fremantle	64 (9)
2023–	North Melbourne	47 (2)
Total		109 (11)
- ^{1} Playing statistics correct to the end of round 22, 2026.

Career highlights
- Peel Thunder premiership player: 2017

Griffin Logue (born 13 April 1998) is a professional Australian rules footballer playing for the North Melbourne Football Club in the Australian Football League (AFL), having previously played for the Fremantle Football Club.

== AFL career ==
Logue was drafted by Fremantle with their first selection and eighth overall in the 2016 national draft. He made his debut in the sixteen point win against the Western Bulldogs at Domain Stadium in round three of the 2017 season.

Late in the round 15 match against St Kilda, Logue gave away a crucial 50-metre penalty after he failed to correctly return the ball to Nick Riewoldt, who had fooled Logue into thinking that he had taken a mark inside forward 50; in fact, it was Tim Membrey who took the mark, and he would later kick a goal from the 50-metre penalty to give his side a nine-point win.

Logue had a strong start to the 2020 season but only played 5 games due to a toe injury sustained in Fremantle's round 5 match against Adelaide. Logue had a consistent year in 2021, playing a 16 out of a possible 22 games; his most games in any season. With injuries to Joel Hamling and Alex Pearce (who returned later in the season) leaving Fremantle with limited tall defence options, Logue was often tasked with playing on the oppositions' tallest forwards.

After starting the 2022 AFL season playing in defence Logue made his forward debut during Fremantle's round eleven clash against Melbourne. Logue again played forward during Fremantle's round twelve clash against Brisbane collecting 13 disposals, seven marks and kicking two goals.

Following the 2022 AFL season, Logue requested a trade to North Melbourne, and was traded on 5 October alongside teammate Darcy Tucker. Logue debuted for North Melbourne in Round 1 of the 2023 AFL season and helped to beat his former side in Round 2 by outplaying his former housemate Matt Taberner.

== Personal life ==
Logue grew up in Perth Western Australia and attended Guildford Grammar, where he was in the school's first XVIII. Logue also represented the school in the 1st VIII for rowing. Griffin's uncle is basketballer Andrew Vlahov and his grandparents, Eva and Len Vlahov, were track and field athletes.

== Statistics ==
Updated to the end of round 22, 2026.

Legend
G	Goals	K	Kicks	D	Disposals	T	Tackles
B	Behinds	H	Handballs	M	Marks

Season	Team	No.	Games	Totals							Averages (per game)							Votes
Season	Team	No.	Games	G	B	K	H	D	M	T	G	B	K	H	D	M	T	Votes
2017	Fremantle	2	13	1	3	71	51	122	53	23	0.1	0.2	5.5	3.9	9.4	4.1	1.8	0
2018	Fremantle	2	0	—	—	—	—	—	—	—	—	—	—	—	—	—	—	0
2019	Fremantle	2	10	0	0	66	54	120	45	19	0.0	0.0	6.6	5.4	12.0	4.5	1.9	0
2020 (Note: The 2020 season was played with 17 home-and-away matches per team (down from 22) and 16-minute quarters with time on (down from 20-minute quarters with time on) due to the impact of the COVID-19 pandemic.)	Fremantle	2	5	0	0	22	27	49	12	5	0.0	0.0	4.4	5.4	9.8	2.4	1.0	0
2021	Fremantle	2	16	0	0	113	71	184	76	22	0.0	0.0	7.1	4.4	11.5	4.8	1.4	0
2022	Fremantle	2	20	8	8	121	130	251	100	35	0.4	0.4	6.1	6.5	12.6	5.0	1.8	0
2023	North Melbourne	19	15	1	1	105	82	187	76	15	0.1	0.1	7.0	5.5	12.5	5.1	1.0	0
2024	North Melbourne	19	2	0	0	15	9	24	9	3	0.0	0.0	7.5	4.5	12.0	4.5	1.5	0
2025	North Melbourne	19	16	1	0	93	93	186	74	23	0.1	0.0	5.8	5.8	11.6	4.6	1.4	0
2026	North Melbourne	19	14	0	0	81	75	156	62	12	0.0	0.0	5.8	5.4	11.1	4.4	0.9	0
Career			111	11	12	687	592	1279	507	157	0.1	0.1	6.2	5.3	11.5	4.6	1.4	0
