= Ben Schwarze =

Australian rules footballer (born 1983)

Personal information
- Full name: Ben Schwarze
- Born: 24 August 1983 (age 43)
- Original team: Sandringham Dragons
- Draft: 18th overall, 2002 Rookie Draft; 68th overall, 2004 AFL draft
- Height: 190 cm (6 ft 3 in)
- Weight: 90 kg (198 lb)

Playing career^{1}
Years	Club	Games (Goals)
2002–2003	St Kilda	0 (0)
2005–2006	North Melbourne	11 (2)
2010-14	Sorrento	74 (193)
- ^{1} Playing statistics correct to the end of 2006.

Ben Schwarze (born 24 August 1983) is a former professional Australian rules football player who played for North Melbourne. He is the brother of Troy Schwarze.

He was originally Rookie listed from the Sandringham Dragons by St Kilda in the 2002 Rookie Draft, remaining on the Saints list for the 2002 and 2003 seasons. After being delisted by the Saints, Schwarze spent the 2004 season playing with Port Melbourne Football Club in the Victorian Football League (VFL) before being drafted by the Kangaroos with selection 68 of the 2004 AFL draft.

He made his debut against the Adelaide Crows in Round 7, 2006 at the Telstra Dome. He broke his ribs in that game and was sidelined for four weeks. He returned and became a regular for the remainder of the season. Despite this, Schwarze was delisted by the Kangaroos at the end of the 2006 season, and moved to South Australia to play for Woodville-West Torrens for two seasons before switching to North Adelaide for the 2009 season.
