= Tasmania Devils Academy =

Australian rules football club

Names
- Full name: Tasmania Devils Academy
- Nickname: Devils

2026 season
- After finals: 7th
- Home-and-away season: 9th

Club details
- Colours: Bottle green Primrose; Maroon
- Competition: Talent League Boys (2019–present); Talent League Girls (2021–present)
- Coach: Jeromey Webberley
- Grounds: Ninja Stadium (capacity: 20.000)
- University of Tasmania Stadium (capacity: 21.000)

Uniforms
Home

The Tasmania Devils Academy (also known as the Tassie Devils) is an Australian rules football club that competes in the Talent League Boys and Talent League Girls competitions. The team is made up of footballers based in Tasmania aged between 17 and 19 years of age, and competes against other representative teams based in metropolitan Melbourne and regional Victoria, as part of the Australian Football League's (AFL) talent pathway systems for male and female players.

== History ==
The Victorian statewide under-18 competition has had a Tasmanian presence since 1995, when a team named the Tassie Mariners entered the boys league and competed until the end of the 2002 season. By the late 2000s, Tasmania had returned to the boys competition as an "academy team" (which played only some matches against select Victorian teams and was not eligible for the league finals series or premiership), before graduating to full-time status as the Tasmania Devils in the 2019 season. The girls team began competing as an "academy team" in 2019 before becoming a full-time team in the 2021 season.

== Home grounds ==
The Devils split home matches between York Park in Launceston and Bellerive Oval in Hobart.

== Honours ==
=== Minor Premierships ===
- 2023 (Boys)

== Seasons ==
=== Boys ===
Tasmania NAB League Boys
| Season | W–L–D | Ladder | Finals result | Best & Fairest | Leading goalkicker | Captain(s) | Coach |
|---|---|---|---|---|---|---|---|
| 2019 | 4–11–0 | 14th | Wildcard Round | Oliver Davis | Jackson Callow (24) | Nic Baker, Jared Dakin & Oliver Davis | Adrian Fletcher |
| 2020 | Season cancelled due to the impact of the COVID-19 pandemic | | | | | | |
| 2021 | 5–3–0 | 5th | Not played | Zach Morris | Jye Menzie (11) | Sam Banks | Adrian Fletcher |
| 2022 | 10–3–0 | 2nd | Preliminary Final | Liam Jones | Brandon Leary (33) | Sam Banks & Lachie Cowan | Jeromey Webberley |
| 2023 | 10–3–0 | 1st | Preliminary Final | Geordie Payne | Jack Dolliver (28) | Tom Beaumont | Jeromey Webberley |
| 2024 | 9–5–0 | 5th | Wildcard Round | Connor Ling | Lenny Douglas (28) | Harry Elmer & Connor Ling | Jeromey Webberley |

=== Girls ===
Tasmania NAB League Girls
| Season | W–L–D | Ladder | Finals result | Best & Fairest | Leading goalkicker | Captain(s) | Coach |
|---|---|---|---|---|---|---|---|
| 2021 | 6–2–0 | 2nd | Elimination Final | Perri King | Amy Prokopiec (12) | TBC | Cameron Joyce |
| 2022 | 4–5–0 | 6th | Not played | Brooke Barwick | Bellah Parker (15) | Jemma Blair | Jeromey Webberley |
| 2023 | 7-6-0 | 7th | Elimination Final | Meg Harrison | Ava Read (20) | Candice Belbin | Jodie Clifford |
| 2024 | 10-3-0 | 2nd | Quarter Final | Priya Bowering | Ava Read (26) | Eva Downie | Jess Wuetschner |

== AFL Draftees ==
2019: Matthew McGuinness

2020: Mitch O'Neill

2021: Sam Banks

2022: Lachie Cowan, Tom McCallum, Seth Campbell, Cameron Owen

2023: Colby McKercher, James Leake, Arie Schoenmaker

2024: Geordie Payne

2025: Avery Thomas

== AFLW Draftees ==
2021: None

2022: Meghan Gaffney, Madison Brazendale

2023: Brooke Barwick, Georgia Clark, Mackenzie Ford

2024: Sophie Strong

== See also ==
- Tasmania Devils (AFL AFLW VFL & VFLW team)
- Tasmania AFL bid
- Tasmanian Devils (2001–2008) (Former VFL team)
- Tassie Mariners
