= Andrew Vlahov =

Australian basketball player (born 1969)

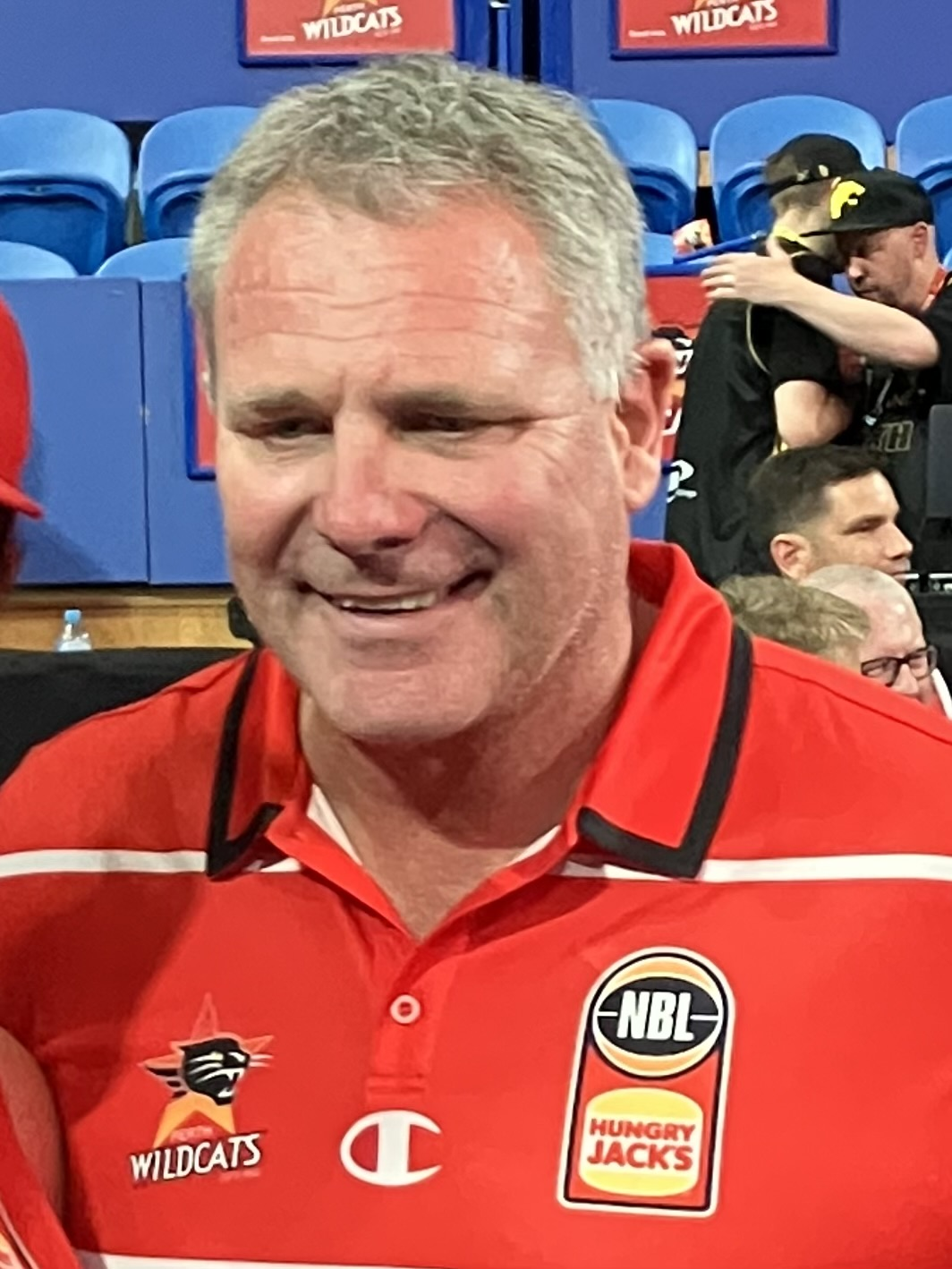
- Vlahov in 2023

Personal information
- Born: 1 April 1969 (age 57) Perth, Western Australia, Australia
- Listed height: 6 ft 7 in (2.01 m)
- Listed weight: 238 lb (108 kg)

Career information
- High school: Kent Street (Perth, Western Australia); South Eugene (Eugene, Oregon)
- College: Stanford (1987–1991)
- NBA draft: 1991: undrafted
- Playing career: 1991–2002
- Position: Small forward / power forward

Career history
- 1991–2002: Perth Wildcats

Career highlights
- 3× NBL champion (1991, 1995, 2000); NBL Grand Final MVP (1995); 2× All-NBL First Team (1992, 1995); 2× All-NBL Second Team (1996, 2000); 2× All-NBL Third Team (1993, 1994); NBL Rookie of the Year (1991); NBL's 20th Anniversary Team; No. 21 retired by Perth Wildcats; 2× Gaze Medal winner (1991, 1993); Australian Basketball Hall of Fame (2007); NIT champion (1991)

Andrew Mitchell Vlahov OAM (born 1 April 1969) is an Australian retired professional basketball player. He played his entire eleven-year professional career for the Perth Wildcats of the National Basketball League (NBL), with whom he won three championships in 1991, 1995 and 2000.

== Early life ==
Vlahov was born in Perth to Eva (née Kampe) and Len Vlahov. His mother had arrived in Australia as a post-war refugee from Latvia, while his father was the son of Croatian immigrants. Both his parents were athletes, and represented Australia at the 1962 British Empire and Commonwealth Games which were held in Perth. Eva was a WA State Long jump champion while Len held the WA State Discus record for 20 consecutive years.

Andrew Vlahov initially attended Kent Street Senior High School in south Perth, but Kent Street Senior did not have a basketball team. He played in his local junior team the Perth Redbacks where he would meet long time friend and future Australian Boomers teammate Luc Longley. Vlahov first came to the U.S. as an exchange student in junior high school, and later returned for his final year of high school, enrolling at South Eugene High School in Eugene, Oregon, while his father (an academic as well as an athlete) worked at the University of Oregon.

== Playing career ==
=== Australian Institute of Sport ===
Vlahov attended the Australian Institute of Sport in 1987.

=== College ===
Vlahov attended college at Stanford University in the US from 1987 to 1991 and was coached by Mike Montgomery.

Vlahov was a key member of Stanford's 1991 National Invitational Tournament championship winning team, scoring 14 points and 11 rebounds in the championship game against Oklahoma.

Vlahov received the following awards at Stanford:

- Best Defensive Player – 3 times (1988–89, 1989–90, 1990–91)
- Most Inspirational Player (1989–90)
- Team Captain (1989–90, 1990–91)
- Pacific-10 Conference All-Academic Team (1989)

Vlahov holds four Stanford school basketball records:

- 5th in career steals (130)
- 7th in career assists (278)
- 9th in season steals (50)
- 10th in career fouls (286)

=== NBL ===
After playing at Stanford, Vlahov was signed by the Perth Wildcats where he played his entire NBL career. A stellar first season with the Wildcats saw Vlahov awarded with the NBL Rookie of the Year Award. Vlahov replaced Mike Ellis as the captain of the club in 1993 after only two seasons in the NBL and remained so until his retirement.

=== International ===
Vlahov was a four-time Olympian playing with the Boomers at the 1988, 1992, 1996 and 2000 Olympic Games.

== Post-playing career ==
While still on the playing roster with the Wildcats, Vlahov teamed up with ex-NBA player and fellow Western Australian Luc Longley to purchase the Wildcats franchise from owner Kerry Stokes. Once Longley pulled out of the venture Vlahov was the majority shareholder of the club (with Mack Hall holding a small minority of shares) until the completion of the 2005/2006 season when Western Australian Jack Bendat took over the club.

In his time as owner of the Wildcats, Vlahov was instrumental in the NBL's push into the Asian market including match telecasts to Asian countries and the now discontinued "Singapore Spectacular" (a regular season match where the Wildcats played host to another NBL team in Singapore). The success of the spectacular actually led to the Singapore Slingers (formerly the Canberra Cannons (1979–2002) and Hunter Pirates (2003–2006)) joining the NBL in 2006. Although the Slingers only lasted in the league until 2008, they remain the only Asian based team in NBL history.

Vlahov's nephew, Griffin Logue, currently plays in the AFL for North Melbourne, having previously played for Fremantle.

Vlahov now leads RV Sport, a premium sports and event marketing company. Vlahov appeared in a television commercial for "King Size Big and Tall", an Australian clothing company that specialises in clothing for big men.

On 4 February 2013, Vlahov was named in the Perth Wildcats 30th Anniversary All-Star team.

On Australia Day 2016, Vlahov was awarded the Medal of the Order of Australia (OAM) for service to basketball as an athlete and administrator.

In August 2021, Vlahov was inducted into the Basketball WA Hall of Fame.
