= Darcy Tucker (footballer) =

Australian rules footballer (born 1997)

Personal information
- Full name: Darcy Tucker
- Born: 23 January 1997 (age 29)
- Original team: North Ballarat Rebels (TAC Cup)/Horsham Saints Football Club
- Draft: No. 27, 2015 national draft
- Height: 184 cm (6 ft 0 in)
- Weight: 78 kg (172 lb)
- Position: Defender/midfielder

Playing career
Years	Club	Games (Goals)
2016–2022	Fremantle	108 (35)
2023–2025	North Melbourne	48 (9)
Total		156 (44)

Darcy Tucker (born 23 January 1997) is a former professional Australian rules footballer who played for the Fremantle and North Melbourne in the Australian Football League (AFL).

== Early career ==
Originally from Horsham, Victoria, he played for the North Ballarat Rebels in the TAC Cup Under 18s competition and also for the Horsham Saints Football Club in the Wimmera Football League. He was recruited to Fremantle with their first selection, 27th overall, in the 2015 AFL draft.

== AFL career ==
He made his AFL debut in Round 5 of the 2016 AFL season, against Carlton at Domain Stadium, after playing well for Fremantle's reserves team, Peel Thunder, in the West Australian Football League (WAFL). Round 7 of the 2022 AFL season saw Tucker play his 100th game during Fremantle's 3 point win over Geelong at GMHBA Stadium. Tucker was traded to North Melbourne alongside teammate Griffin Logue following the 2022 AFL season.

Tucker missed North Melbourne's first two games of the 2023 AFL season due to a minor injury sustained during the pre-season. He made his debut for the Kangaroos in Round 3 against Hawthorn named as the substitute. He entered the game in the third quarter replacing the injured Hugh Greenwood, and had an immediate impact kicking a goal. He played his first full game for North the next week collecting 24 disposals and four inside 50s.

Tucker was delisted by North Melbourne at the end of the 2025 AFL season, having spent three seasons at the club.

== Statistics ==
Legend
G	Goals	K	Kicks	D	Disposals	T	Tackles
B	Behinds	H	Handballs	M	Marks

Season	Team	No.	Games	Totals							Averages (per game)							Votes
Season	Team	No.	Games	G	B	K	H	D	M	T	G	B	K	H	D	M	T	Votes
2016	Fremantle	18	12	3	4	100	77	177	37	48	0.3	0.3	8.3	6.4	14.8	3.1	4.0	0
2017	Fremantle	18	19	8	4	154	135	289	75	45	0.4	0.2	8.1	7.1	15.2	3.9	2.4	0
2018	Fremantle	18	17	8	6	124	119	243	52	55	0.5	0.4	7.3	7.0	14.3	3.1	3.2	0
2019	Fremantle	18	22	10	7	199	221	420	73	81	0.5	0.3	9.0	10.0	19.1	3.3	3.7	0
2020 (Note: The 2020 season was played with 17 home-and-away matches per team (down from 22) and 16-minute quarters with time on (down from 20-minute quarters with time on) due to the impact of the COVID-19 pandemic.)	Fremantle	18	8	4	2	68	44	112	21	26	0.5	0.3	8.5	5.5	14.0	2.6	3.3	2
2021	Fremantle	18	16	0	2	152	120	272	64	29	0.0	0.1	9.5	7.5	17.0	4.0	1.8	0
2022	Fremantle	18	14	2	5	87	63	150	43	24	0.1	0.4	6.2	4.5	10.7	3.1	1.7	0
2023	North Melbourne	13	18	6	2	165	128	293	76	28	0.3	0.1	9.2	7.1	16.3	4.2	1.6	0
2024	North Melbourne	13	23	3	1	253	148	401	102	58	0.1	0.0	11.0	6.4	17.4	4.4	2.5	0
2025	North Melbourne	13	7	0	0	51	42	93	26	10	0.0	0.0	7.3	6.0	13.3	3.7	1.4	0
Career			156	44	33	1353	1097	2450	569	404	0.3	0.2	8.7	7.0	15.7	3.6	2.6	2
