= Paul Dear =

Australian rules footballer (1966–2022)

- Dear with Hawthorn in 1991

Personal information
- Born: 28 December 1966
- Died: 8 July 2022 (aged 55)
- Original team: Churchill
- Height: 188 cm (6 ft 2 in)
- Weight: 106 kg (234 lb)

Playing career^{1}
Years	Club	Games (Goals)
1987–1996	Hawthorn	123 (80)
- ^{1} Playing statistics correct to the end of 1996.

Career highlights
- AFL premiership player: 1991; Norm Smith Medal: 1991

Paul Dear (28 December 1966 – 8 July 2022) was an Australian rules footballer who played for the Hawthorn Football Club in the Australian Football League (AFL). He was awarded the Norm Smith Medal in the 1991 AFL Grand Final.

== Playing career ==
Younger brother of fellow Hawk ruckman Greg Dear, Paul was the smaller of the two; Greg stood at 199 cm to Paul's 188cm. Though giving away inches to taller opponents, Paul would occasionally be the secondary ruckman for the team. The Dear brothers were recruited when the Latrobe Valley was in the Hawthorn zone. A half-forward, Dear made his debut in 1987 and played in that year's Grand Final. He filled in for the unavailable Jason Dunstall at full-forward but ended up on the losing side.

Unable to break into the side during back-to-back premiership years of 1988 and 1989, Dear was consistently named as an emergency.

In 1990, he got regular games, playing 23 games for the year, and his form continued into 1991. He helped Hawthorn defeat West Coast in the 1991 Grand Final with two goals and won the Norm Smith Medal. Dear almost single-handedly turned a nine-point deficit into a ten-point half-time lead by dominating across the Hawthorn half-forward line and setting up several goals.

== Later life ==
In 2020, Dear was diagnosed with untreatable pancreatic cancer. In 2021, Dear appeared on the AFL-centred TV show The Front Bar to promote his charity supporting sufferers of the disease. He died in July 2022, just one week before Hawthorn was to play in the "Dare to Hope" match to raise money for Dare to Hope, the charity that Dear initiated with his wife Cherie. A documentary, entitled Dare to Hope - The Paul Dear Story, was set for release in late 2022.

== Family ==
In 2023, Paul's son Calsher Dear was drafted by Hawthorn under the father-son rule. His eldest son Harry was also drafted by Adelaide in the 2014 AFL Draft, but ultimately did not play any senior matches. In 2025, his daughter Maya was drafted by Hawthorn as the club’s first father-daughter signing.

== Statistics ==
Legend
G	Goals	K	Kicks	D	Disposals	T	Tackles
B	Behinds	H	Handballs	M	Marks
#	Played in that season's premiership team

Season	Team	No.	Games	Totals							Averages (per game)							Votes
Season	Team	No.	Games	G	B	K	H	D	M	T	G	B	K	H	D	M	T	Votes
1987	Hawthorn	13	9	1	4	34	52	86	21	13	0.1	0.4	3.8	5.8	9.6	2.3	1.4	0
1988	Hawthorn	13	0	–	–	–	–	–	–	–	–	–	–	–	–	–	–	–
1989	Hawthorn	13	5	1	0	30	25	55	16	5	0.2	0.0	6.0	5.0	11.0	3.2	1.0	0
1990	Hawthorn	13	23	32	13	199	172	371	102	48	1.4	0.6	8.7	7.5	16.1	4.4	2.1	3
1991^{#}	Hawthorn	13	23	23	22	188	151	339	88	31	1.0	1.0	8.2	6.6	14.7	3.8	1.3	0
1992	Hawthorn	13	13	4	4	100	81	181	37	20	0.3	0.3	7.7	6.2	13.9	2.8	1.5	0
1993	Hawthorn	13	14	4	6	79	81	160	43	23	0.3	0.4	5.6	5.8	11.4	3.1	3.1	0
1994	Hawthorn	13	19	10	4	121	115	236	58	42	0.5	0.2	6.4	6.1	12.4	3.1	2.2	0
1995	Hawthorn	13	15	5	6	79	79	158	46	14	0.3	0.4	5.3	5.3	10.5	3.1	0.9	2
1996	Hawthorn	13	2	0	1	4	5	9	2	1	0.0	0.5	2.0	2.5	4.5	1.0	0.5	0
Career			123	80	60	834	761	1595	413	197	0.7	0.5	6.8	6.2	13.0	3.4	1.6	5

== Honours and achievements ==
Team

- AFL premiership player (Hawthorn): 1991

Individual

- Norm Smith Medal: 1991
- State of Origin (Victoria 2nd XVIII team): 1990
