= Troy Schwarze =

Australian rules footballer (born 1981)

Personal information
- Born: 23 December 1981 (age 44)
- Original team: Dingley / Prahran U18
- Debut: Round 4, 2 April 2000, St Kilda vs. Melbourne, at M.C.G.
- Height: 190 cm (6 ft 3 in)
- Weight: 92 kg (203 lb)

Playing career^{1}
Years	Club	Games (Goals)
2000–2006	St Kilda	71 (20)
2007-15, 2017-18, 2022, 2026	Sorrento	138s 3 r (110)
- ^{1} Playing statistics correct to the end of 2006.

Career highlights
- St Kilda AFL WHL Cup Winning side 2004.; Sorrento playing coach 2007-2012, 2014-15; MPNFL premierships 2008, 2010-12, 2014; SFNC Life Membership 2019

Troy Schwarze (born 23 December 1981) is a former Australian rules footballer in the Australian Football League.

He was recruited as the number 53 draft pick (traded by Carlton for Matthew Lappin and number 58, Ian Prendergast), in the 1998 AFL draft from Dingley. At the time Schwarze was the youngest player on an AFL list at 17 years of age.

== AFL career ==
Schwarze made his debut for St Kilda in Round 4, 2000 against Melbourne and in his early seasons was a much-maligned player. The turning point in Schwarze's career was in Round 6, 2004 against the Brisbane Lions where he kicked the match-winning goal from 55 metres out in the last moments of the match at Telstra Dome.

Schwarze played in St Kilda’s 2004 Wizard Home Loans Cup winning side - St Kilda's second AFL Cup win.

His brother, Ben Schwarze, was once also a St Kilda rookie, at the same time as Troy. Ben was delisted and picked up by the North Melbourne Football Club being a regular at the Kangaroos in 2006, but still being delisted at the end of the year.

In 2006 Schwarze was a steady contributor to the Saints, playing many utility roles in defence and occasionally in attack. 2006 saw him used up forward, as was evidenced in the Round 4 game against Port Adelaide where he kicked 3 goals to spark a second-half resurgence from the Saints.

Schwarze then suffered a hamstring injury in Round 13 and did not return to the side for the remainder of the year. He was delisted by St Kilda at the end of 2006 and, despite some interest from Port Adelaide and the Saints themselves, was not picked up by any clubs in either the National or Internal drafts.

== After AFL ==
Schwarze was appointed the senior coach of the Sorrento Football Club in 2007.
