= Len Vlahov =

Australian athlete

Personal information
- Full name: Leonard Peter Vlahov
- Born: 29 June 1940 Perth, Western Australia
- Died: 24 February 1997 (aged 56) Perth, Western Australia, Australia
- Height: 6 ft 4 in (193 cm)
- Weight: 16 st (224 lb; 102 kg)

Sport
- Sport: Athletics
- Events: Discus, shot put
Medal record
Men's athletics
Representing Western Australia
Australian Championships
Gold medal – first place	1969 Melbourne	Discus
Gold medal – first place	1975 Adelaide	Discus
Silver medal – second place	1961 Brisbane	Discus
Silver medal – second place	1962 Sydney	Discus
Silver medal – second place	1963 Adelaide	Discus
Silver medal – second place	1964 Melbourne	Discus
Silver medal – second place	1966 Perth	Discus
Silver medal – second place	1970 Adelaide	Discus
Silver medal – second place	1971 Brisbane	Discus
Silver medal – second place	1972 Perth	Discus
Silver medal – second place	1974 Melbourne	Discus
Bronze medal – third place	1960 Perth	Discus
Bronze medal – third place	1969 Melbourne	Shot put
Bronze medal – third place	1973 Sydney	Discus

Leonard Peter "Len" Vlahov (29 June 1940 – 24 February 1997) was an Australian track and field athlete who specialised in the discus. He was the national champion in 1969 and 1975, and represented Australia at the 1962 British Empire and Commonwealth Games and the 1967 Summer Universiade.

== Early life and education ==
Vlahov was born in Perth, with both his parents being Croatian immigrants. He attended Perth Junior Technical School and Kent Street Senior High School, and then went on to the University of Western Australia, where he received an initial Bachelor of Economics (B.Ec.) degree and then completed a Master of Education (M.Ed.) degree.

== Athletics career ==
Vlahov was the Western Australian state champion in the discus 20 times, and runner-up on another four occasions. He also won the state shot put title three times, the decathlon twice, and the hammer throw once. Between 1960 and 1975, Vlahov medalled for Western Australia in thirteen editions of the Australian Open Track and Field Championships. He won two gold medals (in 1969 and 1975), nine silver medals, and three bronze medals. With the exception of a bronze medal for the shot put in 1969, all of his medals were for the discus.

At the 1962 British Empire and Commonwealth Games, hosted in Perth, Vlahov was one of four Australians selected to compete in the men's discus event. He placed sixth overall with a throw of 158 feet 5 inches (48.29 m), and was the second-best Australian behind gold medallist Warwick Selvey. Vlahov also represented Australia at the 1967 Summer Universiade in Tokyo, and served as the flag-bearer. He threw 52.52 metres (172 ft 4 in) to place fourth overall, landing 0.64 metres (2 ft 1 in) behind bronze medallist Neal Steinhauer of the United States.

== Later life and family ==
Vlahov completed a doctorate in education at Murdoch University, and eventually became a professor at Edith Cowan University. He also conducted work at the University of Oregon in the United States. A member of the Lutheran Church of Australia, Vlahov was chairman of the group behind the establishment of the Living Waters Lutheran College, Western Australia's only Lutheran school at the time of its opening.

Vlahov died of cancer in 1997, aged 56. He was married to Eva Kampe, who also represented Australia in athletics at the 1962 Perth Games. Their son, Andrew Vlahov, became a professional basketball player, while a grandson, Griffin Logue, is a professional Australian rules footballer.
