= List of AFL debuts in 2024 =

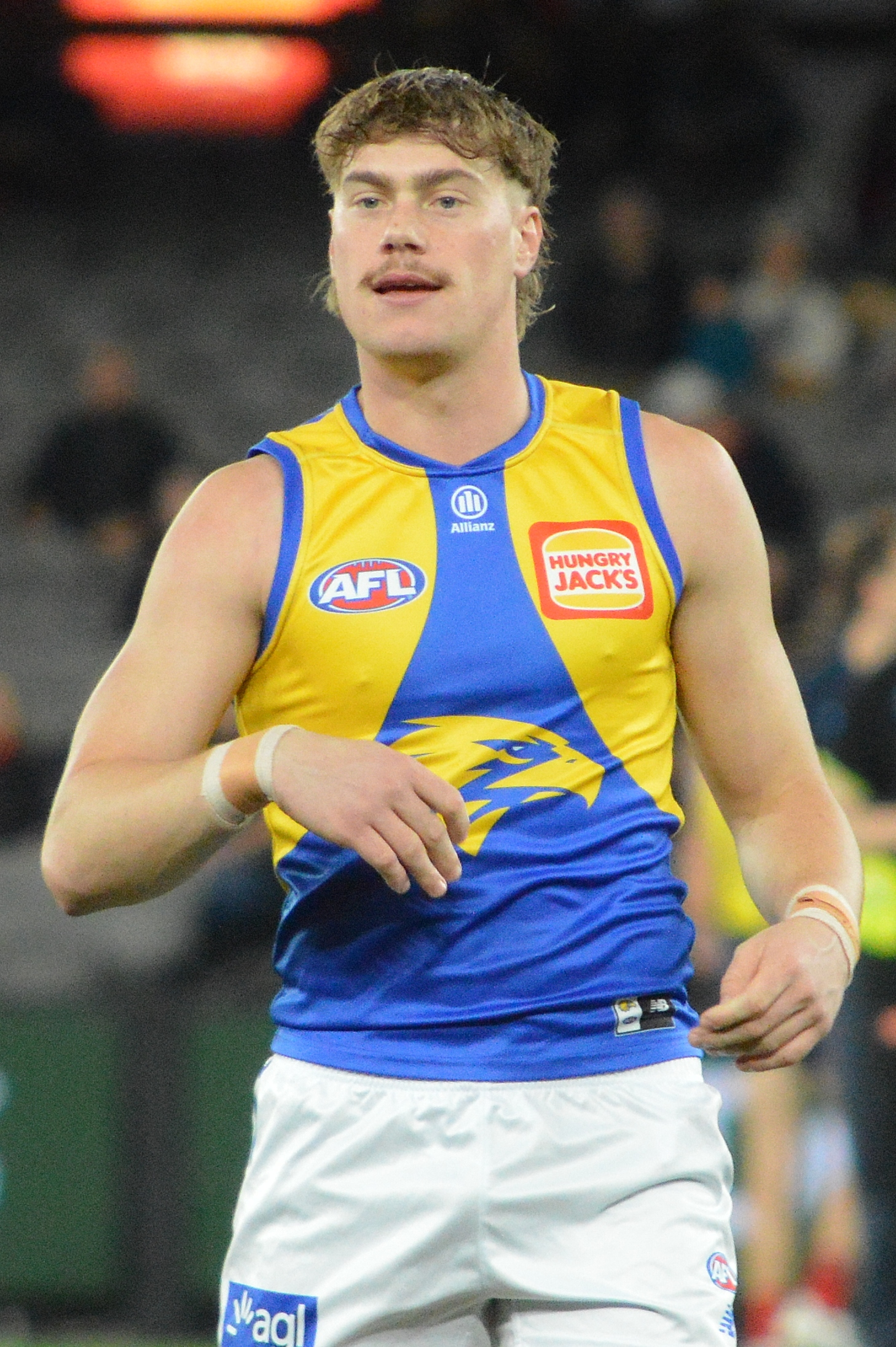
Harley Reid debuted for West Coast in round one

This is a list of players in the Australian Football League (AFL) who have either made their AFL debut or played for a new club during the 2024 AFL season.

== Summary ==
Summary of debuts in 2024
Club	AFL debuts	Change of club
Adelaide	5	1
Brisbane Lions	4	1
Carlton	3	2
Collingwood	6	3
Essendon	2	4
Fremantle	5	2
Geelong	3	0
Gold Coast	5	0
Greater Western Sydney	4	0
Hawthorn	3	3
Melbourne	5	2
North Melbourne	6	4
Port Adelaide	2	4
Richmond	6	2
St Kilda	6	3
Sydney	2	3
West Coast	6	2
Western Bulldogs	4	3
Total	76	39

== AFL debuts ==
Name	Club	Age at debut	Debut round	Games (in 2024)	Goals (in 2024)	Notes
Blake Howes	Melbourne	20 years, 335 days	Opening	16	0	Pick 39, 2021 national draft
Caleb Windsor	Melbourne	18 years, 272 days	Opening	19	8	Pick 7, 2023 national draft
Seth Campbell	Richmond	19 years, 71 days	Opening	21	10	Pick 12, 2022 Rookie draft
Charlie Dean	Collingwood	22 years, 264 days	Opening	8	0	Pick 2, 2021 Rookie draft
Harvey Thomas	Greater Western Sydney	19 years, 21 days	Opening	22	9	Pick 59, 2023 national draft
Nick Watson	Hawthorn	19 years, 21 days	1	18	25	Pick 5, 2023 national draft
Zane Duursma	North Melbourne	18 years, 201 days	1	13	9	Pick 4, 2023 national draft
Colby McKercher	North Melbourne	18 years, 339 days	1	16	0	Pick 2, 2023 national draft
Toby Pink	North Melbourne	25 years, 218 days	1	15	7	Delisted free agent in 2023
Shaun Mannagh	Geelong	26 years, 223 days	1	12	15	Pick 36, 2023 national draft
Lance Collard	St Kilda	18 years, 356 days	1	3	0	Pick 28, 2023 national draft
Darcy Wilson	St Kilda	18 years, 211 days	1	23	15	Pick 18, 2023 national draft
Harvey Gallagher	Western Bulldogs	20 years, 173 days	1	20	9	Pick 39, 2022 national draft
Ryley Sanders	Western Bulldogs	19 years, 56 days	1	14	0	Pick 6, 2023 national draft
Harley Reid	West Coast	18 years, 335 days	1	20	10	Pick 1, 2023 national draft
Josh Draper	Fremantle	20 years, 43 days	2	20	0	2022 Category B rookie selection
Jed Walter	Gold Coast	18 years, 290 days	2	14	11	Pick 3, 2023 national draft
Mykelti Lefau	Richmond	25 years, 276 days	2	10	14	2024 Pre-season supplemental selection
Angus Hastie	St Kilda	18 years, 193 days	3	5	1	Pick 33, 2023 national draft
Caleb Mitchell	Sydney	19 years, 234 days	3	2	0	Pick 40, 2022 national draft
Loch Rawlinson	West Coast	18 years, 310 days	4	1	0	Pick 1, 2024 rookie draft
Sam Clohesy	Gold Coast	21 years, 117 days	4	20	6	Pick 4, 2024 rookie draft
Will Graham	Gold Coast	18 years, 255 days	4	17	8	Pick 26, 2023 national draft
Ethan Read	Gold Coast	18 years, 275 days	4	4	3	Pick 9, 2023 national draft
Kane McAuliffe	Richmond	19 years, 37 days	4	9	0	Pick 40, 2023 national draft
Koltyn Tholstrup	Melbourne	18 years, 288 days	5	10	5	Pick 13, 2023 national draft
Hugo Garcia	St Kilda	18 years, 327 days	5	9	1	Pick 50, 2023 national draft
Connor O'Sullivan	Geelong	18 years, 331 days	5	1	0	Pick 11, 2023 national draft
Tyler Sellers	North Melbourne	21 years, 249 days	5	2	0	2024 Pre-season supplemental selection
Jake Rogers	Gold Coast	19 years, 50 days	6	9	2	Pick 14, 2023 national draft
Darcy Jones	Greater Western Sydney	20 years, 22 days	7	14	12	Pick 21, 2022 national draft
Riley Hardeman	North Melbourne	19 years, 60 days	7	3	0	Pick 23, 2023 national draft
Jaxon Binns	Carlton	19 years, 181 days	7	3	2	Pick 32, 2022 national draft
Cooper Simpson	Fremantle	19 years, 74 days	7	2	0	Pick 35, 2023 national draft
Patrick Voss	Fremantle	20 years, 303 days	7	7	7	Pick 11, 2022 rookie draft
Dan Curtin	Adelaide	19 years, 55 days	8	7	3	Pick 8, 2023 national draft
Lachie Sullivan	Collingwood	26 years, 221 days	8	10	2	2024 Pre-season supplemental selection
Harvey Johnston	West Coast	18 years, 260 days	8	6	0	Pick 49, 2023 national draft
Charlie Clarke	Western Bulldogs	20 years, 122 days	8	1	0	Pick 24, 2022 national draft
Calsher Dear	Hawthorn	18 years, 275 days	8	17	25	Pick 56, 2023 national draft
Logan Morris	Brisbane Lions	18 years, 361 days	8	18	22	Pick 31, 2023 national draft
Bruce Reville	Brisbane Lions	23 years, 73 days	8	12	4	2023 Queensland zone selection
Joel Freijah	Western Bulldogs	18 years, 179 days	9	13	1	Pick 45, 2023 national draft
Joe Richards	Collingwood	24 years, 171 days	9	9	6	Pick 48, 2022 national draft
Tyrell Dewar	West Coast	20 years, 46 days	9	7	5	2022 Academy selection
Shadeau Brain	Brisbane Lions	20 years, 89 days	9	9	0	2022 Academy selection
Steely Green	Richmond	20 years, 130 days	10	6	5	Pick 55, 2022 national draft
Wil Dawson	North Melbourne	18 years, 151 days	10	3	0	Pick 22, 2023 national draft
Ethan Phillips	Hawthorn	24 years, 307 days	10	1	0	2024 Pre-season supplemental selection
Ed Allan	Collingwood	19 years, 364 days	11	2	1	Pick 19, 2022 national draft
Wil Parker	Collingwood	21 years, 361 days	11	5	1	2023 Category B rookie selection
Nate Caddy	Essendon	18 years, 316 days	11	10	9	Pick 45, 2023 national draft
Kaleb Smith	Richmond	19 years, 194 days	12	4	1	Pick 49, 2022 national draft
Billy Dowling	Adelaide	19 years, 340 days	13	9	4	Pick 43, 2022 national draft
Jack Hutchinson	West Coast	22 years, 212 days	13	7	2	Pick 3, 2024 mid-season rookie draft
Arie Schoenmaker	St Kilda	19 years, 157 days	14	4	0	Pick 62, 2023 national draft
Tew Jiath	Collingwood	19 years, 106 days	14	1	0	Pick 37, 2023 national draft
Logan Evans	Port Adelaide	18 years, 259 days	15	13	2	Pick 12, 2024 mid-season rookie draft
Caiden Cleary	Sydney	19 years, 109 days	15	5	2	Pick 24, 2023 national draft
Max Gruzewski	Greater Western Sydney	19 years, 337 days	15	4	3	Pick 22, 2022 national draft
Kynan Brown	Melbourne	19 years, 161 days	15	2	0	Pick 22, 2024 rookie draft
Hugh Davies	Fremantle	19 years, 269 days	15	2	0	Pick 33, 2023 national draft
Andy Moniz-Wakefield	Melbourne	20 years, 246 days	16	6	0	2021 Category B rookie selection
Zac Taylor	Adelaide	21 years, 150 days	16	9	4	Pick 44, 2021 national draft
Lawson Humphries	Geelong	21 years, 157 days	16	11	1	Pick 63, 2023 national draft
Will Lorenz	Port Adelaide	19 years, 132 days	16	2	0	Pick 57, 2023 national draft
Jacob Blight	Richmond	22 years, 199 days	16	3	0	Pick 2, 2024 mid-season rookie draft
Joe Fonti	Greater Western Sydney	19 years, 195 days	17	5	0	Pick 44, 2023 national draft
Hugh Bond	Adelaide	19 years, 292 days	18	7	0	Pick 50, 2022 national draft
Henry Smith	Brisbane Lions	21 years, 301 days	19	4	0	Pick 48, 2020national draft
Clay Hall	West Coast	19 years, 82 days	21	3	0	Pick 38, 2023 national draft
Archie Roberts	Essendon	18 years, 260 days	21	4	1	Pick 54, 2023 national draft
Angus McLennan	St Kilda	20 years, 337 days	21	2	0	2022 Category B rookie selection
Liam Reidy	Fremantle	24 years, 64 days	23	2	0	Pick 13, 2023 rookie draft
Cooper Lord	Carlton	19 years, 151 days	23	2	0	Pick 9, 2024 mid-season rookie draft
Ashton Moir	Carlton	19 years, 125 days	23	2	2	Pick 29, 2023 national draft

== Change of AFL club ==
Name	Club	Age at debut	Debut round	Games (in 2024)	Goals (in 2024)	Former clubs	Recruiting method
Brodie Grundy	Sydney	29 years, 327 days	Opening	26	2	Collingwood & Melbourne	Traded in 2023
Jack Billings	Melbourne	28 years, 202 days	Opening	16	4	St Kilda	Traded in 2023
James Jordon	Sydney	23 years, 78 days	Opening	26	9	Melbourne	Free agent in 2023
Orazio Fantasia	Carlton	28 years, 176 days	Opening	15	9	Essendon & Port Adelaide	Delisted free agent in 2023
Sam Naismith	Richmond	31 years, 237 days	Opening	3	0	Sydney	Delisted free agent in 2023
Jacob Koschitzke	Richmond	23 years, 242 days	Opening	14	12	Hawthorn	Traded in 2023
Lachie Schultz	Collingwood	26 years, 100 days	Opening	20	24	Fremantle	Traded in 2023
Xavier Duursma	Essendon	23 years, 253 days	1	15	9	Port Adelaide	Traded in 2023
Todd Goldstein	Essendon	35 years, 259 days	1	14	2	North Melbourne	Free agent in 2023
Jade Gresham	Essendon	26 years, 205 days	1	22	19	St Kilda	Free agent in 2023
Ben McKay	Essendon	26 years, 83 days	1	23	0	North Melbourne	Free agent in 2023
Mabior Chol	Hawthorn	27 years, 47 days	1	23	37	Richmond & Gold Coast	Traded in 2023
Massimo D'Ambrosio	Hawthorn	20 years, 285 days	1	24	7	Essendon	Traded in 2023
Jack Ginnivan	Hawthorn	21 years, 98 days	1	23	28	Collingwood	Traded in 2023
Zac Fisher	North Melbourne	25 years, 275 days	1	18	0	Carlton	Traded in 2023
Dylan Stephens	North Melbourne	23 years, 68 days	1	16	0	Sydney	Traded in 2023
Riley Bonner	St Kilda	27 years, 9 days	1	19	1	Port Adelaide	Pick 3, 2023 pre-season draft
Liam Henry	St Kilda	22 years, 201 days	1	12	7	Fremantle	Traded in 2023
Chris Burgess	Adelaide	28 years, 111 days	1	7	7	Gold Coast	Traded in 2023
Lachlan Bramble	Western Bulldogs	25 years, 333 days	1	24	2	Hawthorn	2024 Pre-season supplemental selection
Nick Coffield	Western Bulldogs	24 years, 146 days	1	8	0	St Kilda	Traded in 2023
James Harmes	Western Bulldogs	28 years, 164 days	1	9	7	Melbourne	Traded in 2023
Esava Ratugolea	Port Adelaide	25 years, 237 days	1	23	4	Geelong	Traded in 2023
Ivan Soldo	Port Adelaide	27 years, 338 days	1	8	5	Richmond	Traded in 2023
Brandon Zerk-Thatcher	Port Adelaide	25 years, 205 days	1	26	0	Essendon	Traded in 2023
Tyler Brockman	West Coast	21 years, 116 days	1	10	1	Hawthorn	Traded in 2023
Oscar McDonald	Fremantle	27 years, 365 days	1	1	0	Melbourne & Carlton	Delisted free agent in 2023
Jeremy Sharp	Fremantle	22 years, 217 days	1	23	10	Gold Coast	2024 Pre-season supplemental selection
Elijah Hollands	Carlton	21 years, 339 days	3	22	17	Gold Coast	Traded in 2023
Taylor Adams	Sydney	30 years, 199 days	4	19	9	Greater Western Sydney & Collingwood	Traded in 2023
Bigoa Nyuon	North Melbourne	22 years, 332 days	5	3	0	Richmond	Traded in 2023
Jordon Sweet	Port Adelaide	26 years, 78 days	6	17	4	Western Bulldogs	Traded in 2023
Jack Bytel	Collingwood	24 years, 59 days	9	7	1	St Kilda	2024 Pre-season supplemental selection
Paddy Dow	St Kilda	24 years, 215 days	10	10	3	Carlton	Traded in 2023
Shane McAdam	Melbourne	28 years, 357 days	10	3	1	Adelaide	Traded in 2023
Brandon Ryan	Brisbane Lions	26 years, 201 days	11	1	1	Hawthorn	Traded in 2023
Matt Flynn	West Coast	26 years, 262 days	12	4	1	Greater Western Sydney	Free agent in 2023
Brynn Teakle	North Melbourne	24 years, 244 days	15	11	9	Port Adelaide	Pick 15, 2024 mid-season rookie draft
Ned Long	Collingwood	21 years, 151 days	17	7	2	Hawthorn	Pick 19, 2024 mid-season rookie draft

== See also ==
- List of AFL Women's debuts in 2024
