= Frank Considine =

Australian rules footballer

Personal information
- Full name: Frank Considine
- Born: 1 April 1934
- Died: 4 March 2001 (aged 66)
- Original teams: Old Paradians Amateur Football Club, VAFA
- Height: 175 cm (5 ft 9 in)
- Weight: 78 kg (172 lb)

Playing career^{1}
Years	Club	Games (Goals)
1954–1957	Hawthorn	21 (1)
- ^{1} Playing statistics correct to the end of 1957.

Frank Considine (1 April 1934 – 4 March 2001) was an Australian rules footballer who played in the Victorian Football League during the 1950s. He played 21 games for Hawthorn between 1954 and 1957. He was recruited from the Old Paradians Amateur Football Club in the Victorian Amateur Football Association (VAFA).

His older brothers Bernie and Maurie also played football for Hawthorn.
