= Bernard Considine =

Australian sportsman (1925–1989)

Personal information
- Full name: Bernard Thomas Considine
- Born: 8 April 1925; Ararat, Victoria
- Died: 4 June 1989 (aged 64); Queensland
- Original team: Old Paradians
- Height: 188 cm (6 ft 2 in)
- Weight: 86 kg (190 lb)

Playing career^{1}
Years	Club	Games (Goals)
1952–53	Hawthorn	16 (7)
- ^{1} Playing statistics correct to the end of 1953.

Bernard Thomas 'Bernie' Considine (8 April 1925 – 4 June 1989) was an Australian sportsman who played first-class cricket for Victoria and Tasmania as well as Australian rules football with Hawthorn in the Victorian Football League (VFL).

Prior to his sporting career, Considine served with the Royal Australian Air Force in World War II.

Considine, an Old Paradian, played regularly for Hawthorn from Round 7 in the 1952 VFL season. He managed just three senior appearances the next season and ended his league career with 16 games and seven goals. He then moved to Tasmania to coach the Cooee Football Club in the 1954 North West Football Union season.

As a right arm fast bowler, Considine took 25 wickets at 29.44 from eight first-class matches. His best bowling performance was figures of 6/85 which were taken when he represented Victoria against Western Australia at the Melbourne Cricket Ground in a Sheffield Shield match. The Ararat born paceman played one match for Tasmania, in 1954/55, against the Marylebone Cricket Club and his three top order wickets were Denis Compton, Len Hutton and Reg Simpson.

His younger brothers, Maurie and Frank also played football for Hawthorn.

== See also ==
- List of Victoria first-class cricketers
- List of Tasmanian representative cricketers
