= Isaac Kako =

Australian rules footballer (born 2006)

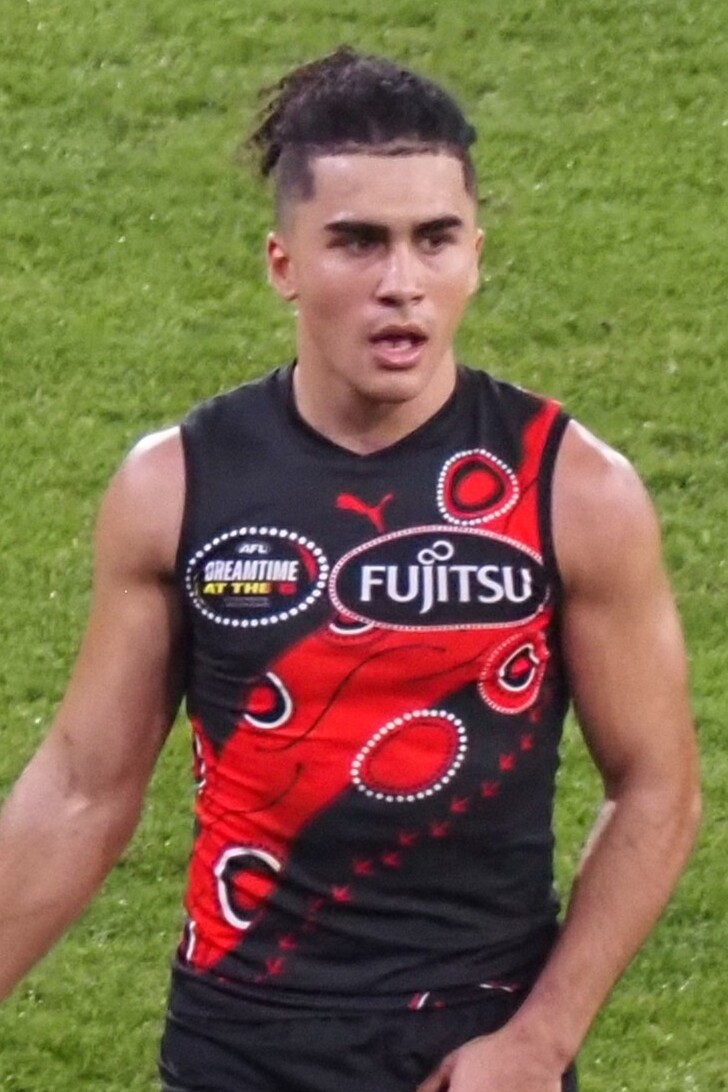
- Kako playing for Essendon in 2025

Personal information
- Full name: Isaac Kako
- Born: 7 March 2006 (age 20)
- Original team: Calder Cannons (Talent League)
- Draft: No. 13, 2024 national draft
- Debut: Round 1, 2025, Essendon vs. Hawthorn, at Melbourne Cricket Ground
- Height: 176 cm (5 ft 9 in)
- Weight: 73 kg (161 lb)
- Position: Forward

Club information
- Current club: Essendon
- Number: 10

Playing career^{1}
Years	Club	Games (Goals)
2025–	Essendon	38 (24)
- ^{1} Playing statistics correct to the end of 2026.

Career highlights
- AFL Rising Star nominee: 2025

Isaac Kako (born 7 March 2006) is a professional Australian rules footballer playing for the Essendon Football Club in the Australian Football League. Kako, renowned for his speed, agility, and sharp goal-scoring instincts, joined Essendon after being selected with pick No. 13 in the 2024 AFL draft. Essendon secured Kako by matching a bid from Richmond due to his eligibility through Essendon's Next Generation Academy (NGA) program.

== Early life ==
Kako was born in Australia to Assyrian parents from Iraq, Laith and Samiya, who migrated in 1999 in search of better opportunities. Raised in Melbourne's northern suburbs, Kako attended Parade College with future Essendon teammate Nate Caddy. He played junior football for Northern Saints and Pascoe Vale in the Essendon District Football League.

== Junior career ==
He began his footballing journey with the Northern Saints before progressing to the Calder Cannons in the Talent League. Quickly recognized for his dynamic playing style, Kako debuted for the Cannons in 2022, displaying early potential as an exciting small forward and earning selection in the Vic Metro squad for the National Under-16 Championships.

Kako's rapid development continued in 2023, when he kicked 22 goals in 11 matches, including a 7-goal haul against the Northern Territory. In 2024, he elevated his game further, averaging 18.7 disposals per match and scoring 20 goals; achievements that secured him a position in the Coates Talent League Team of the Year and the AFL Under-18 All-Australian team. Highlights included a four-goal haul in a Vic Metro trial game and three crucial goals in the National Championships decider against Vic Country. Despite an ankle injury cutting his season short, Kako's consistent form made him a sought-after talent, ultimately leading Essendon to select him with pick No. 13 in the 2024 AFL Draft.

== AFL career ==
A lifelong Essendon supporter, Kako joined the Bombers with pick 13 in the 2024 AFL draft, via their Next Generation Academy (NGA) program, after the club matched a bid from Richmond.

To start his first season in the AFL, Kako kicked 4 goals in Essendon's pre-season match against Geelong at GMHBA Stadium, putting him in the frame for an early season debut. Kako was selected for a round 1 debut, in a match against Hawthorn at the Melbourne Cricket Ground. Kako kicked the opening goal of the match, which he scored with his first kick.

Kako received the AFL Rising Star nomination for his 17-disposal performance in Round 17, 2025 which also included 7 score involvements and a goal. He finished the season having played all 23 home-and-away games for the Bombers.

== Statistics ==
Updated to the end of round 22, 2026.

Legend
G	Goals	K	Kicks	D	Disposals	T	Tackles
B	Behinds	H	Handballs	M	Marks

Season	Team	No.	Games	Totals							Averages (per game)							Votes
Season	Team	No.	Games	G	B	K	H	D	M	T	G	B	K	H	D	M	T	Votes
2025	Essendon	10	23	15	9	127	130	257	45	58	0.7	0.4	5.5	5.7	11.2	2.0	2.5	0
2026	Essendon	10	13	8	7	64	67	131	24	25	0.6	0.5	4.9	5.2	10.1	1.8	1.9	0
Career			36	23	16	191	197	388	69	83	0.6	0.4	5.3	5.5	10.8	1.9	2.3	0

== Honours and achievements ==
=== Junior football ===
- Coates Talent League Team of the Year: 2024
- AFL Under-18 All-Australian team: 2024

=== AFL ===
- Rising Star nomination - Round 17, 2025
