= Levi Ashcroft =

Australian rules footballer (born 2006)

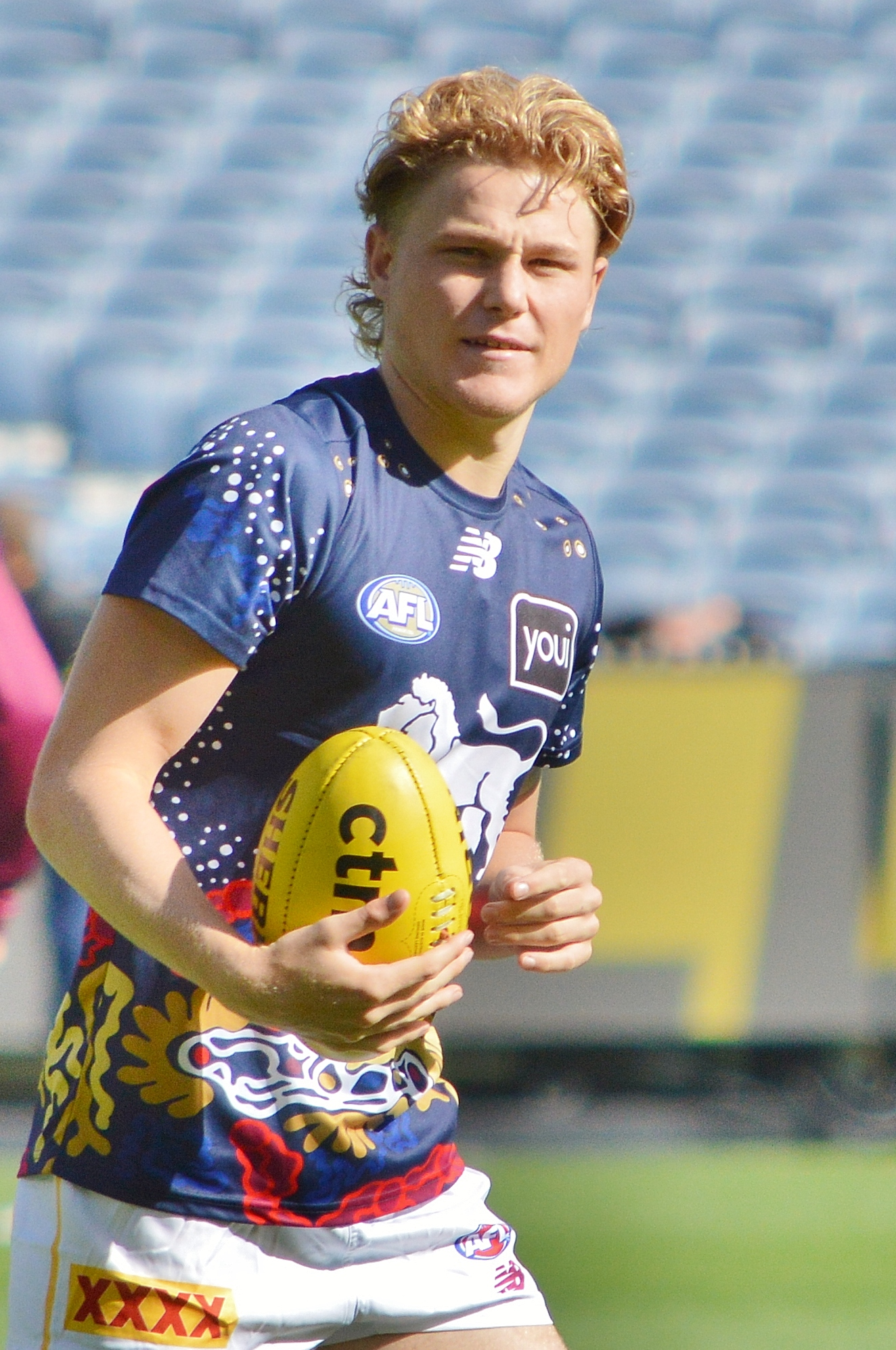
- Ashcroft in April 2025

Personal information
- Born: 18 December 2006 (age 19); Gold Coast, Queensland
- Original team: Brisbane Lions(VFL)/Sandringham Dragons (NAB League) / Brighton Grammar (APS) / St Kilda City (SMJFL) / Southport (QAFL) / Broadbeach (QAFL)
- Draft: No. 5 (F/S), 2024 AFL draft
- Height: 181 cm (5 ft 11 in)
- Position: Midfielder

Club information
- Current club: Brisbane Lions
- Number: 10

Playing career^{1}
| Years | Club | Games (Goals) |
| 2025– | Brisbane Lions | 49 (23) |
- ^{1} Playing statistics correct to the end of round 23, 2026.

Career highlights
- 2× AFL premiership player: 2025, 2026; AFL Rising Star nominee: 2025; 22under22 team: 2025

Levi Ashcroft (born 18 December 2006) is an Australian rules footballer currently playing for the Brisbane Lions in the Australian Football League (AFL). He was selected with Pick 5 in the 2024 Telstra AFL draft, under the father–son rule.

== Early life ==
Ashcroft was born on 18 December 2006 on the Gold Coast, to parents Rebecca and Marcus. He has 2 siblings, one of whom is fellow professional footballer Will Ashcroft. His father, Marcus Ashcroft, is a 3-time AFL premiership player who competed in 318 games for the Brisbane Bears/Lions over the course of his 15-year professional career. While based on the Gold Coast, Levi attended All Saints Anglican School and began playing junior football in 2014 for the Broadbeach Cats in the local under-9s competition.

Ashcroft has stated that his idol growing up was then-Gold Coast captain Gary Ablett Jr. and through his father's football manager role at the Suns, Ashcroft had the opportunity to observe Ablett up close and has stated that he modelled his game around Ablett's style from a young age. In 2016, Ashcroft switched clubs and began playing junior football for the Southport Sharks. Despite being 11 years old at the time, Ashcroft was playing for Southport's under-14s division 1 team in 2018 and was considered an outstanding junior prospect.

A year later he relocated to Melbourne with his family where he began attending Brighton Grammar and played junior football for St Kilda City in the South Metro Junior Football League. He temporarily moved back to Queensland in 2020 to play in the QAFL junior league for Morningside during the COVID-19 pandemic-affected year which cancelled all junior football competitions within Victoria. He played in Morningside's U14 Division 1 premiership winning team during the 2020 QAFL junior season.

Upon returning to Melbourne in 2021, Ashcroft caught the eye of Coates Talent League recruiters and signed to play for the Sandringham Dragons in the 2022 season, despite only recently turning 15 years of age. Ashcroft got the opportunity to play alongside his brother Will throughout the 2022 season and played in Sandringham's grand final victory that year as well as representing Victoria Metro at the U16 national championships and was named in the U16 All Australian team that year.

Ashcroft enjoyed a successful junior football career, winning 3 consecutive Coates Talent League premierships between 2022 and 2024, Sandringham's best and fairest award at 16, the APS Premiership with Brighton Grammar in 2024 and leading Victoria Metro to a gold medal win in the 2024 national championships. He was named in the U18 All Australian team in 2023 and 2024 respectively. In August 2024, Ashcroft elected to return to his home state of Queensland by agreeing to join the Brisbane Lions under the father–son rule.

== AFL career ==
Ashcroft joined the Brisbane Lions as a father–son selection in the 2024 AFL draft. Ashcroft received a 2025 AFL Rising Star nomination for his effort in round 4 of the 2025 AFL season against Richmond at the MCG, collecting 22 disposals, 4 intercept possessions, 6 score involvements and kicking a goal during the match.

Ashcroft was selected in the 2025 22under22 team.

In his first season of AFL football, Ashcroft became a premiership player as the Lions claimed victory in the 2025 AFL Grand Final. Ashcroft scored an important second quarter goal from the edge of the 50-metre arc, cancelling out a 55-metre goal from Geelong's Shannon Neale from only moments before. Ashcroft (18y 283d) became the youngest player to play for the Brisbane Lions in a grand final, and only the 4th 18-year-old to play in a Grand Final since 1987.

After the 2025 season, Ashcroft signed an additional 3-year contract extension with Brisbane, to the end of 2030.

Ashcroft enjoyed a second consecutive premiership in 2026, winning the 2026 grand final, kicking a crucial second-quarter goal.

== Statistics ==
Updated to the end of round 22, 2026.

Legend
| G | Goals | K | Kicks | D | Disposals | T | Tackles |
| B | Behinds | H | Handballs | M | Marks |
| # | Played in that season's premiership team |

| Season | Team | No. | Games | Totals | | | | | | | Averages (per game) | | | | | | | Votes |
| Season | Team | No. | Games | G | B | K | H | D | M | T | G | B | K | H | D | M | T | Votes |
|---|---|---|---|---|---|---|---|---|---|---|---|---|---|---|---|---|---|---|
| 2025^{#} | Brisbane Lions | 10 | 27 | 12 | 10 | 325 | 192 | 517 | 120 | 33 | 0.4 | 0.4 | 12.0 | 7.1 | 19.1 | 4.4 | 1.2 | 0 |
| 2026^{#} | Brisbane Lions | 10 | 21 | 10 | 14 | 247 | 169 | 416 | 113 | 25 | 0.5 | 0.7 | 11.8 | 8.0 | 19.8 | 5.4 | 1.2 | 0 |
| Career | | | 48 | 22 | 24 | 572 | 361 | 933 | 233 | 58 | 0.5 | 0.5 | 11.9 | 7.5 | 19.4 | 4.9 | 1.2 | 0 |
