= Jack Hutchinson (footballer, born 2001) =

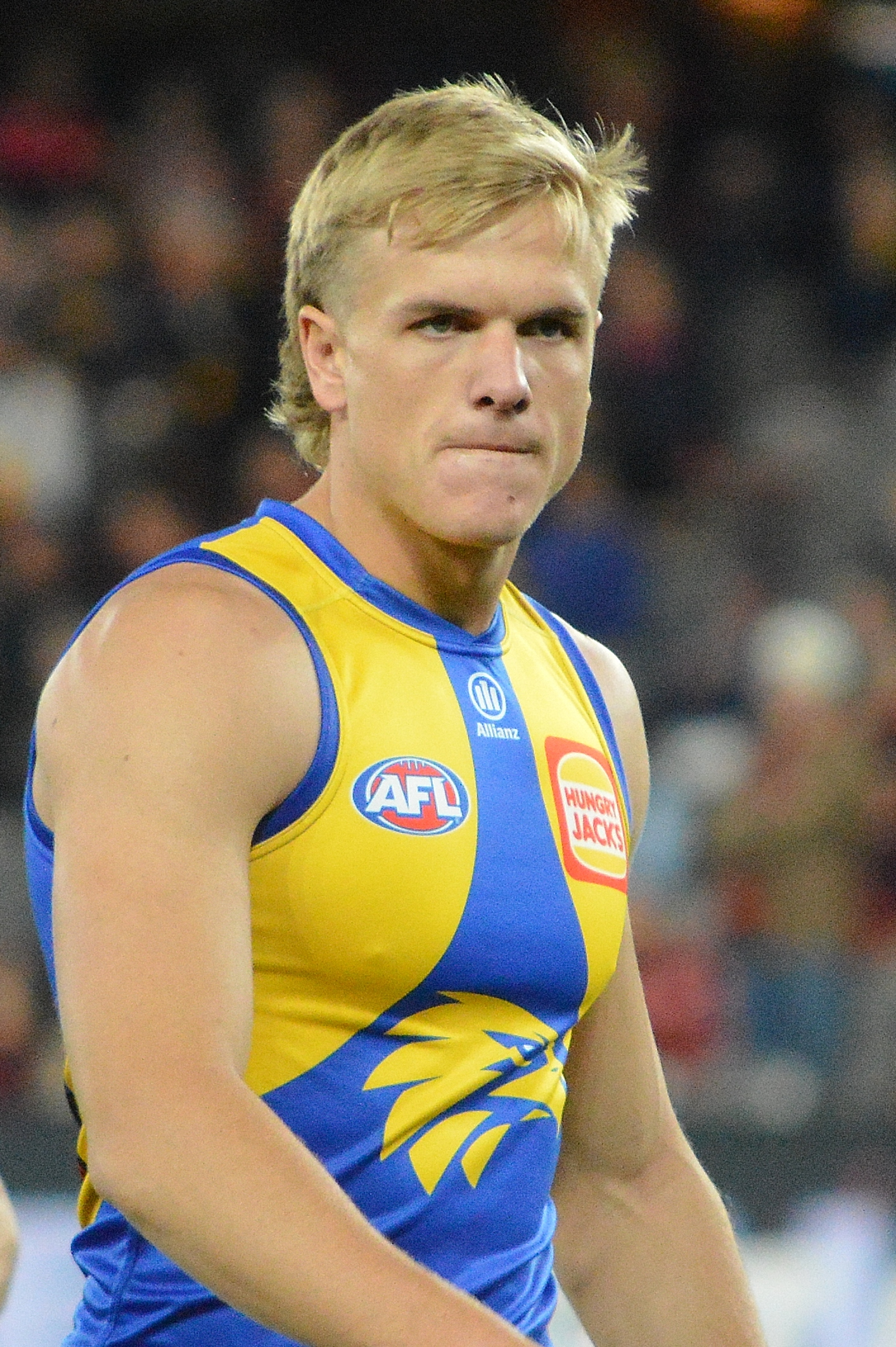
- Hutchinson in May 2026

Personal information
- Born: 10 November 2001 (age 24)
- Original teams: Collingwood (VFL); Wontahaggi (GL)
- Draft: 3rd overall, 2024 AFL Mid Season Draft (West Coast)
- Debut: Round 13, 2024, West Coast vs. North Melbourne, at Optus Stadium
- Height: 190 cm (6 ft 3 in)
- Position: Midfielder

Club information
- Current club: West Coast
- Number: 44

Playing career^{1}
Years	Club	Games (Goals)
2024–	West Coast	29 (6)
- ^{1} Playing statistics correct to the end of round 22, 2026.

Jack Hutchinson (born 10 November 2001) is an Australian rules footballer who plays for the West Coast Eagles in the Australian Football League (AFL).

Hutchinson was recruited from the Collingwood Football Club VFL side with pick 3 in the 2024 Mid Season Draft. He made his AFL debut in round 13 of the 2024 AFL season.

== Early career ==
Originally from Inverloch-Kongwak, Victoria, Hutchinson was a standout in the Gippsland League playing for Wonthaggi, where his athleticism, strong marking, and goal sense began to catch attention. After showcasing his talent—including multiple goals in four of his first five games—for Wonthaggi, he was encouraged by coach Jarryd Blair (a former Collingwood premiership player) to step up to the VFL, joining Collingwood’s reserves in early 2024. His impact was immediate: averaging around 9.4 disposals, 3.4 marks, and 3.2 tackles in limited games, he also kicked nine goals across seven matches, drawing widespread praise. This strong showing at VFL level led to his selection with pick No. 3 in the 2024 Mid‑Season Rookie Draft by West Coast.

== AFL career ==
=== 2024: Debut season ===
Hutchinson made his AFL debut quickly in Round 13 of the 2024 season, just days after being drafted. Over the remainder of 2024, Hutchinson featured in seven games, averaging about 8.9 disposals, 1.7 marks, and 3.3 tackles per match, and kicked a total of 2 goals.

=== 2025 ===
Entering the 2025 season, Hutchinson secured more opportunities, playing 10 games by mid-June. He boosted his averages to roughly 12.8 marks and 6.8 kicks per game, along with 3.4 tackles, showcasing solid improvement and consistency.

== See also ==
- List of AFL debuts in 2024
- List of West Coast Eagles players

== Statistics ==
Updated to the end of round 22, 2026.

Legend
G	Goals	K	Kicks	D	Disposals	T	Tackles
B	Behinds	H	Handballs	M	Marks

Season	Team	No.	Games	Totals							Averages (per game)							Votes
Season	Team	No.	Games	G	B	K	H	D	M	T	G	B	K	H	D	M	T	Votes
2024	West Coast	44	7	2	3	22	40	62	12	23	0.3	0.4	3.1	5.7	8.9	1.7	3.3	0
2025	West Coast	44	16	1	7	123	90	213	66	49	0.1	0.4	7.7	5.6	13.3	4.1	3.1	0
2026	West Coast	44	6	3	2	19	22	41	10	21	0.5	0.3	3.2	3.7	6.8	1.7	3.5	0
Career			29	6	12	164	152	316	88	93	0.2	0.4	5.7	5.2	10.9	3.0	3.2	0
