= Cynthia Cameron =

Australian taekwondo practitioner

Personal information
- Nationality: Australian
- Born: 26 March 1980 (age 45); Perth, Western Australia

Sport
- Sport: Taekwondo

Cynthia Moir (née Cameron, born 26 March 1980) is an Australian taekwondo practitioner, born in Perth. She competed at the 2000 Summer Olympics in Sydney. Her son Ashton Moir plays Australian rules football for the Carlton Football Club.
