= 2025 AFL Rising Star =

Australian football award

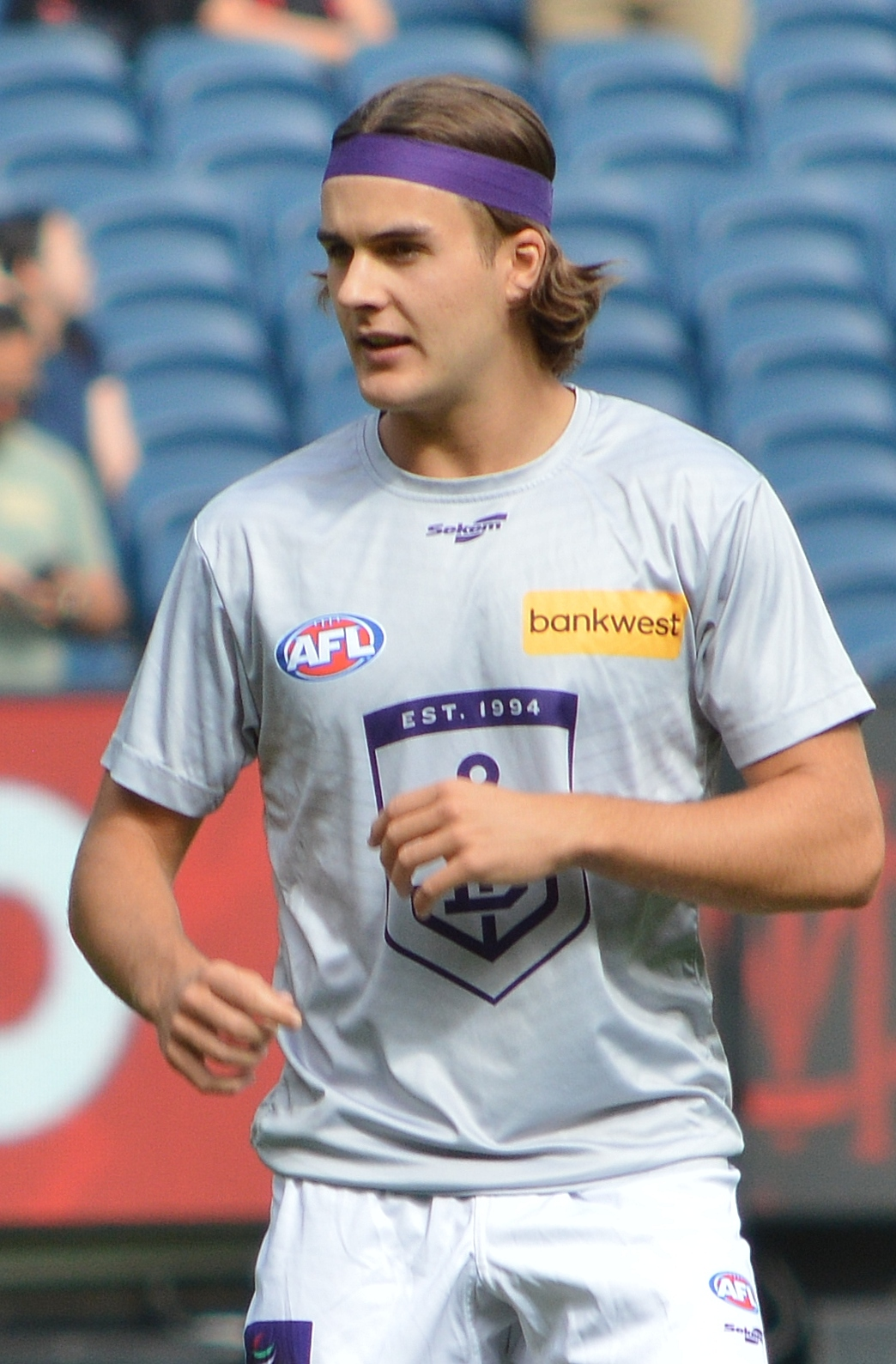
- Murphy Reid, recipient of the 2025 Rising Star award
- Sponsored by: Telstra
- Country: Australia
- Ron Evans Medallist: Murphy Reid (Fremantle)

The Telstra AFL Rising Star award is given annually to a standout young player in the Australian Football League (AFL). The winner also receives the Ron Evans Medal, named for the former AFL chairman.

The 2025 winner was Murphy Reid, from the Fremantle Football Club.

== Eligibility ==
Every round, a nomination is given to a standout young player who performed well during that particular round. To be eligible for nomination, a player must be under 21 on 1 January of that year and have played ten or fewer senior games before the start of the season; a player who is suspended may be nominated, but is not eligible to win the award.

== Nominations ==
Key
^	Winner

2025 AFL Rising Star nominees
Round	Player	Club	Ref.
0/1 (Note: Due to inclement weather, only two games were played in Opening Round. Those games were "incorporated into the round one Rising Star nomination process".)	Sam Lalor	Richmond	
2	Connor O'Sullivan	Geelong	
3	Harvey Langford	Melbourne	
4	Levi Ashcroft	Brisbane Lions	
5	Archie Roberts	Essendon	
6	Murphy Reid^	Fremantle	
7	Xavier Lindsay	Melbourne	
8	Hugo Garcia	St Kilda	
9	Nate Caddy	Essendon	
10	Cooper Lord	Carlton	
11	Angus Clarke	Essendon	
12	Ed Allan	Collingwood	
13	Dan Curtin	Adelaide	
14	Tyrell Dewar	West Coast	
15	Finn O'Sullivan	North Melbourne	
16	Clay Hall	West Coast	
17	Isaac Kako	Essendon	
18	Luke Trainor	Richmond	
19	Ashton Moir	Carlton	
20	Joe Fonti	Greater Western Sydney	
21	Ethan Read	Gold Coast	
22	Hugh Boxshall	St Kilda	
23	Harry Rowston	Greater Western Sydney	
24	Matt Carroll	Carlton	

== Final voting ==
The winner was decided by a 10-person panel consisting of Andrew Dillon (chair), Eddie Betts, Jude Bolton, Nathan Buckley, Kane Cornes, Abbey Holmes, Glen Jakovich, Laura Kane, Matthew Pavlich and Kevin Sheehan. Each member awarded five votes to the player they determined most deserving, four votes to the second-most deserving, and so on to one vote to the fifth-most deserving.

=== Vote receivers ===
	Player	Club	Votes
1	Murphy Reid	Fremantle	48
2	Dan Curtin	Adelaide	35
3	Levi Ashcroft	Brisbane Lions	26
4	Harvey Langford	Melbourne	18
5	Connor O'Sullivan	Geelong	17
6	Archie Roberts	Essendon	6

=== Full votes ===
Panel member	5 votes	4 votes	3 votes	2 votes	1 vote
Andrew Dillon (chair)	Murphy Reid (Fremantle)	Levi Ashcroft (Brisbane Lions)	Dan Curtin (Adelaide)	Harvey Langford (Melbourne)	Connor O'Sullivan (Geelong)
Eddie Betts	Murphy Reid (Fremantle)	Dan Curtin (Adelaide)	Connor O'Sullivan (Geelong)	Harvey Langford (Melbourne)	Archie Roberts (Essendon)
Jude Bolton	Murphy Reid (Fremantle)	Dan Curtin (Adelaide)	Levi Ashcroft (Brisbane Lions)	Archie Roberts (Essendon)	Harvey Langford (Melbourne)
Nathan Buckley	Dan Curtin (Adelaide)	Harvey Langford (Melbourne)	Murphy Reid (Fremantle)	Connor O'Sullivan (Geelong)	Archie Roberts (Essendon)
Kane Cornes	Murphy Reid (Fremantle)	Levi Ashcroft (Brisbane Lions)	Harvey Langford (Melbourne)	Dan Curtin (Adelaide)	Connor O'Sullivan (Geelong)
Abbey Holmes	Murphy Reid (Fremantle)	Dan Curtin (Adelaide)	Levi Ashcroft (Brisbane Lions)	Connor O'Sullivan (Geelong)	Archie Roberts (Essendon)
Glen Jakovich	Murphy Reid (Fremantle)	Levi Ashcroft (Brisbane Lions)	Dan Curtin (Adelaide)	Connor O'Sullivan (Geelong)	Archie Roberts (Essendon)
Laura Kane	Murphy Reid (Fremantle)	Dan Curtin (Adelaide)	Connor O'Sullivan (Geelong)	Levi Ashcroft (Brisbane Lions)	Harvey Langford (Melbourne)
Matthew Pavlich	Murphy Reid (Fremantle)	Dan Curtin (Adelaide)	Levi Ashcroft (Brisbane Lions)	Connor O'Sullivan (Geelong)	Harvey Langford (Melbourne)
Kevin Sheehan	Murphy Reid (Fremantle)	Harvey Langford (Melbourne)	Levi Ashcroft (Brisbane Lions)	Dan Curtin (Adelaide)	Connor O'Sullivan (Geelong)

== See also ==
- 2025 AFL Women's Rising Star
