= Paul Considine =

Australian rules footballer

Personal information
- Born: 11 June 1962 (age 64)
- Original team: Ringwood Football Club
- Debut: 1981
- Height: 178 cm (5 ft 10 in)
- Weight: 73 kg (161 lb)

Playing career^{1}
Years	Club	Games (Goals)
1981–1985	Hawthorn	7 (5)
- ^{1} Playing statistics correct to the end of 1985.

Paul Considine (born 11 June 1962) is a former Australian rules footballer who played in the Victorian Football League during the 1980s. He played 7 games for Hawthorn between 1981 and 1985. He was recruited from the Ringwood Football Club.

He now works with his four brothers for the Secon Freight Logistics company, which his father Maurie Considine started in 1969. Maurie also played football for Hawthorn in the 1950s.
