= Harvey Langford =

Australian rules footballer

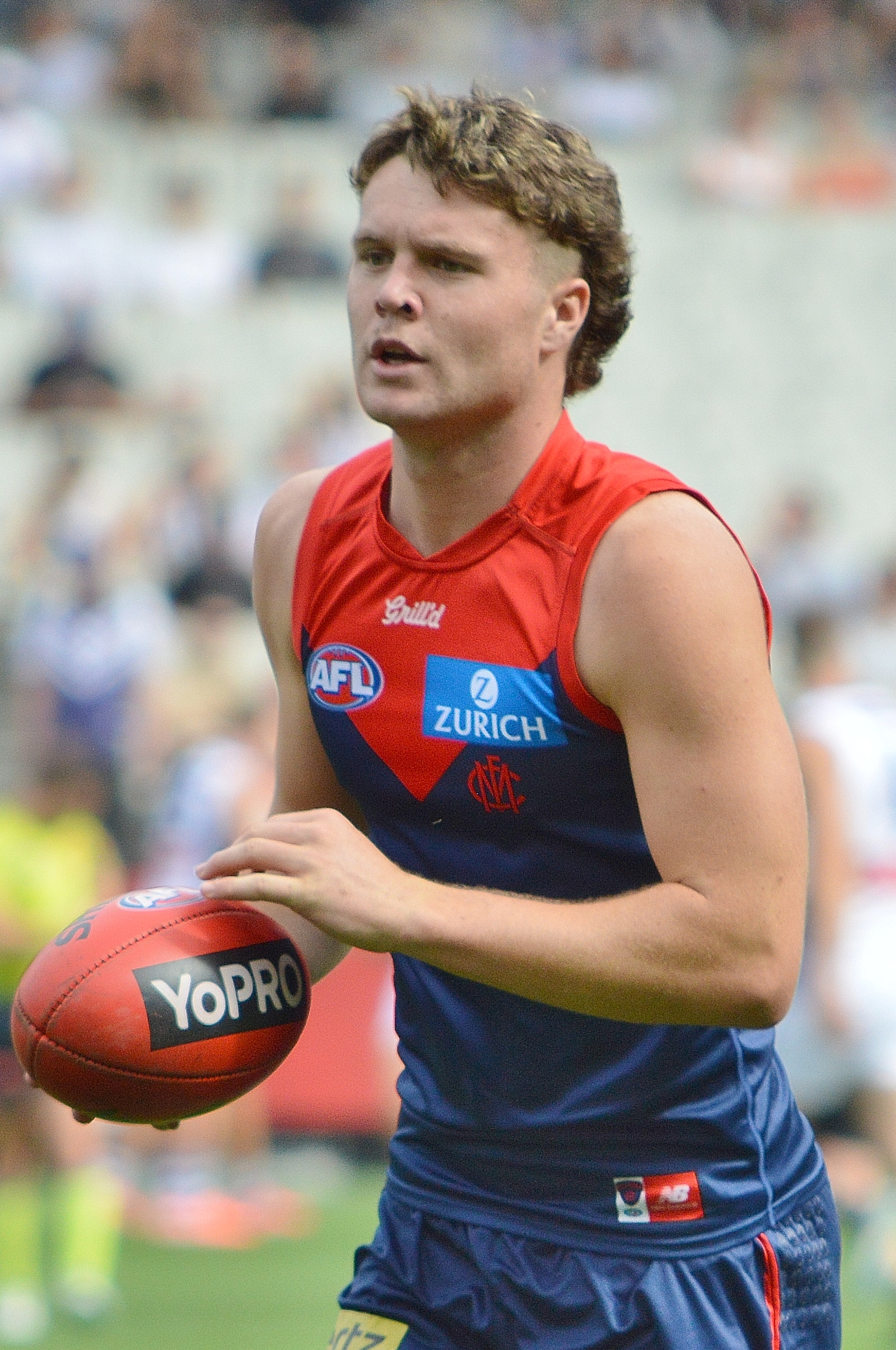
- Langford in April 2025

Personal information
- Born: 15 March 2006 (age 20)
- Original team: Dandenong Stingrays
- Draft: No. 6, 2024 AFL draft
- Debut: 16 March 2025, Melbourne vs. Greater Western Sydney, at MCG
- Height: 190 cm (6 ft 3 in)
- Position: Midfielder

Club information
- Current club: Melbourne
- Number: 4

Playing career^{1}
Years	Club	Games (Goals)
2025–	Melbourne	43 (35)
- ^{1} Playing statistics correct to the end of round 22, 2026.

Career highlights
- Harold Ball Memorial Trophy: 2025; AFL Rising Star nominee: 2025; Larke Medal: 2024

Harvey Langford (born 15 March 2006) is a professional Australian rules footballer playing for the Melbourne Football Club in the Australian Football League (AFL).

== Schooling ==
Langford graduated from Mornington Secondary College in 2024.

== Junior career ==
Playing for the Dandenong Stingrays in the Talent League, Langford averaged 25.9 disposals and 1.3 goals a game in 2024, and 25.5 disposals playing for Victoria Country in the Under 18 Championships, winning the Larke Medal for best player in the competition.

== AFL career ==
Langford was selected by the Melbourne Football Club with pick 6 in the 2024 AFL draft. He made his debut in round 1 of the 2025 AFL season against the Greater Western Sydney Giants, starting the game as the substitute. In round 3 of the season Langford had 26 disposals and scored a goal against the Gold Coast Suns, earning himself the Rising Star nomination for the round. He would eventually finish 4th in the Rising Star count.

== Statistics ==
Updated to the end of round 22, 2026.

Legend
G	Goals	K	Kicks	D	Disposals	T	Tackles
B	Behinds	H	Handballs	M	Marks

Season	Team	No.	Games	Totals							Averages (per game)							Votes
Season	Team	No.	Games	G	B	K	H	D	M	T	G	B	K	H	D	M	T	Votes
2025	Melbourne	19	22	14	5	208	187	395	71	27	0.6	0.2	9.5	8.5	18.0	3.2	1.2	0
2026	Melbourne	4	21	21	10	167	173	340	77	37	1.0	0.5	8.0	8.2	16.2	3.7	1.8	0
Career			43	35	15	375	360	735	148	64	0.8	0.3	8.7	8.4	17.1	3.4	1.5	0
