= Maurie Considine =

Australian rules footballer (1932–2023)

Personal information
- Full name: Maurice Joseph Considine
- Born: 14 June 1932
- Died: 26 November 2023 (aged 91)
- Original teams: Old Paradians Amateur Football Club, VAFA
- Debut: 1952
- Height: 183 cm (6 ft 0 in)
- Weight: 84 kg (185 lb)

Playing career^{1}
| Years | Club | Games (Goals) |
| 1952–1956 | Hawthorn | 37 (1) |
- ^{1} Playing statistics correct to the end of 1956.

Maurice Joseph Considine (14 June 1932 – 26 November 2023) was an Australian rules footballer who played in the Victorian Football League during the 1950s. He played 37 games for Hawthorn between 1952 and 1956. He was recruited from the Old Paradians Amateur Football Club in the Victorian Amateur Football Association (VAFA).

His older brother Bernie, younger brother Frank and son Paul also played football for Hawthorn.

Considine coached Old Paradians to four premierships before becoming John Kennedy's assistant coach at Hawthorn. He was named as coach of the Old Paradians Team of the Century. For his services to Hawthorn as player and reserves coach he was awarded life membership of the club in 1970.

Considine co-founded the Melbourne transport company Secon Carriers (now Secon Freight Logistics) in 1969. In 2019, to mark the company's 50th anniversary, he wrote a business memoir, It's in Our Blood.

Considine died on 26 November 2023, at the age of 91.

== Honours and achievements ==
Individual

- Hawthorn life member
