= Dan Curtin (footballer) =

Australian rules football player (born 2005)

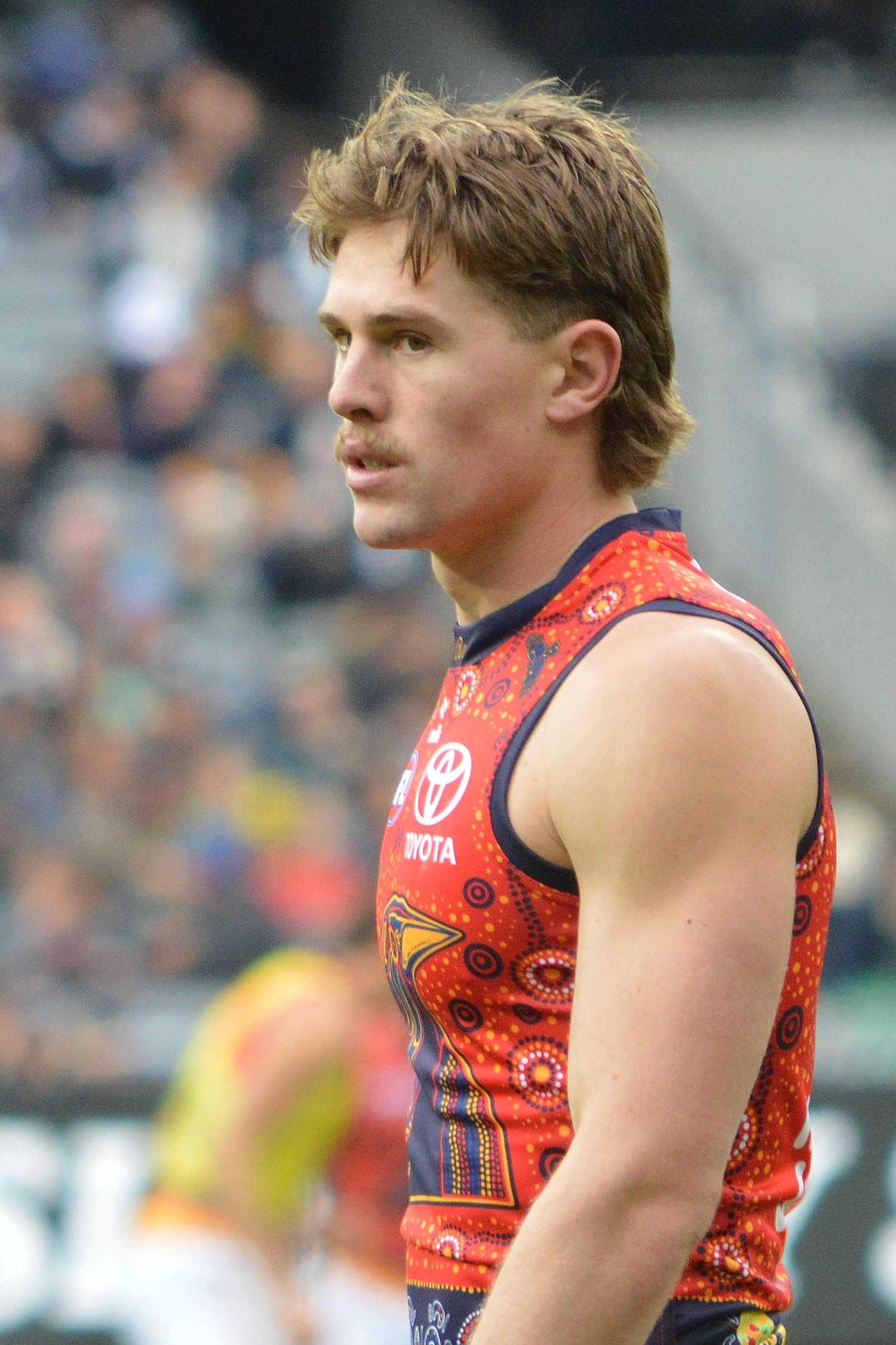
- Curtin in May 2025

Personal information
- Full name: Daniel John Curtin
- Nickname: DC
- Born: 8 March 2005 (age 21); Perth, Western Australia
- Original teams: Claremont (WAFL); West Coast JFC
- Draft: No. 8, 2023 national draft
- Debut: Round 8, 2024, Adelaide vs. Port Adelaide, at Adelaide Oval
- Height: 197 cm (6 ft 6 in)
- Weight: 94 kg (207 lb)
- Position: Utility

Club information
- Current club: Adelaide
- Number: 6

Playing career^{1}
Years	Club	Games (Goals)
2024—	Adelaide	46 (16)
- ^{1} Playing statistics correct to the end of round 22, 2026.

Career highlights
- AFL Rising Star nominee: 2025; 22under22 team: 2025; Mark Bickley Emerging Talent Award: 2025

Daniel John Curtin (born 8 March 2005) is an Australian rules footballer who plays for the Adelaide Football Club in the Australian Football League (AFL). He was drafted by the Crows from the Claremont Football Club in the West Australian Football League (WAFL) with the eighth overall pick in the 2023 national draft.

Curtin made his debut in Round 8 of the 2024 AFL season in the Showdown against Port Adelaide at Adelaide Oval. He is a utility who has been deployed in various positions around the ground, including as a midfielder, wingman, key defender, and as a high half-forward.

== Early life ==
Born in Perth, Western Australia, Curtin grew up supporting the Fremantle Football Club in the AFL.

Curtin played for the Claremont Football Club in his junior career. Curtin was selected in the All-Australian team after the 2023 AFL Under 18 Championships and captained the Claremont Colts team to the 2023 premiership. He excelled at both senior and State level throughout the 2023 season.

He was selected by Adelaide at pick number 8 in the 2023 national draft after the Crows traded up in a deal with Greater Western Sydney which saw them give up pick number 11 and 15 in return for pick number 8 and 17. Curtin seemed a perfect suitor for Adelaide, who were lacking defensive height due to the departure of Tom Doedee and the injuries of Nick Murray and Jordon Butts. A versatile player who played as a defender, forward and midfield during his junior career, Curtin was projected to be a top 5 pick but dropped down to pick number 8.

Curtin's brother Cody plays for the Brisbane Lions and was drafted in the 2025 national draft.

== AFL career ==
Curtin's long-awaited debut was announced on 30 April, 2024, two days prior to the round 8 Showdown versus Port Adelaide. He was the last of the first nine 2023 national draftees to make their debut. Playing as a tall half-back, Curtin debuted with 9 disposals in 56% time on ground. He was substituted off tactically at three quarter time and replaced by veteran Brodie Smith. It wasn't until round 22 against the Western Bulldogs that Curtin played an entire game without being substituted, and he made it count by kicking his first two career goals as well as creating three clearances.

A career-best game came for Curtin in round 2 of 2025, when Curtin scored new personal best statistics in disposals, marks and tackles, due to his positional change to a half-forward and wing role. His performance was complete with a goal in the 61-point victory over Essendon. Curtin played an important role in a five-point win over reigning premiers Brisbane Lions, collecting 14 disposals, 6 tackles, and 6 marks, and ultimately being rewarded with a nomination for the 2025 AFL Rising Star award. In June, Curtin signed a three-year contract extension, keeping him at the Crows until at least the end of 2029, shunning offers from Western Australian clubs. He celebrated his contract extension with a career-best game against Richmond, during which he was the best on ground with 26 disposals and two goals. On the back of a dominant month of July, Curtin emerged as an early favourite for the 2025 AFL Rising Star winner.

He finished the 2025 season with receiving the Mark Bickley Emerging Talent Award. He also finished second in the 2025 AFL Rising Star behind Fremantle's Murphy Reid. Curtin's 2026 pre-season was interrupted in January when he dislocated his knee.

== Statistics ==
Updated to the end of round 22, 2026.

Legend
G	Goals	K	Kicks	D	Disposals	T	Tackles
B	Behinds	H	Handballs	M	Marks

Season	Team	No.	Games	Totals							Averages (per game)							Votes
Season	Team	No.	Games	G	B	K	H	D	M	T	G	B	K	H	D	M	T	Votes
2024	Adelaide	6	7	3	0	29	25	54	16	7	0.4	0.0	4.1	3.6	7.7	2.3	1.0	0
2025	Adelaide	6	25	11	7	224	110	334	113	86	0.4	0.3	9.0	4.4	13.4	4.5	3.4	0
2026	Adelaide	6	14	2	6	138	72	210	58	52	0.1	0.4	9.9	5.1	15.0	4.1	3.7	0
Career			46	16	13	391	207	598	187	145	0.3	0.3	8.5	4.5	13.0	4.1	3.2	0
