= Mykelti Lefau =

Australian rules footballer (born 1998)

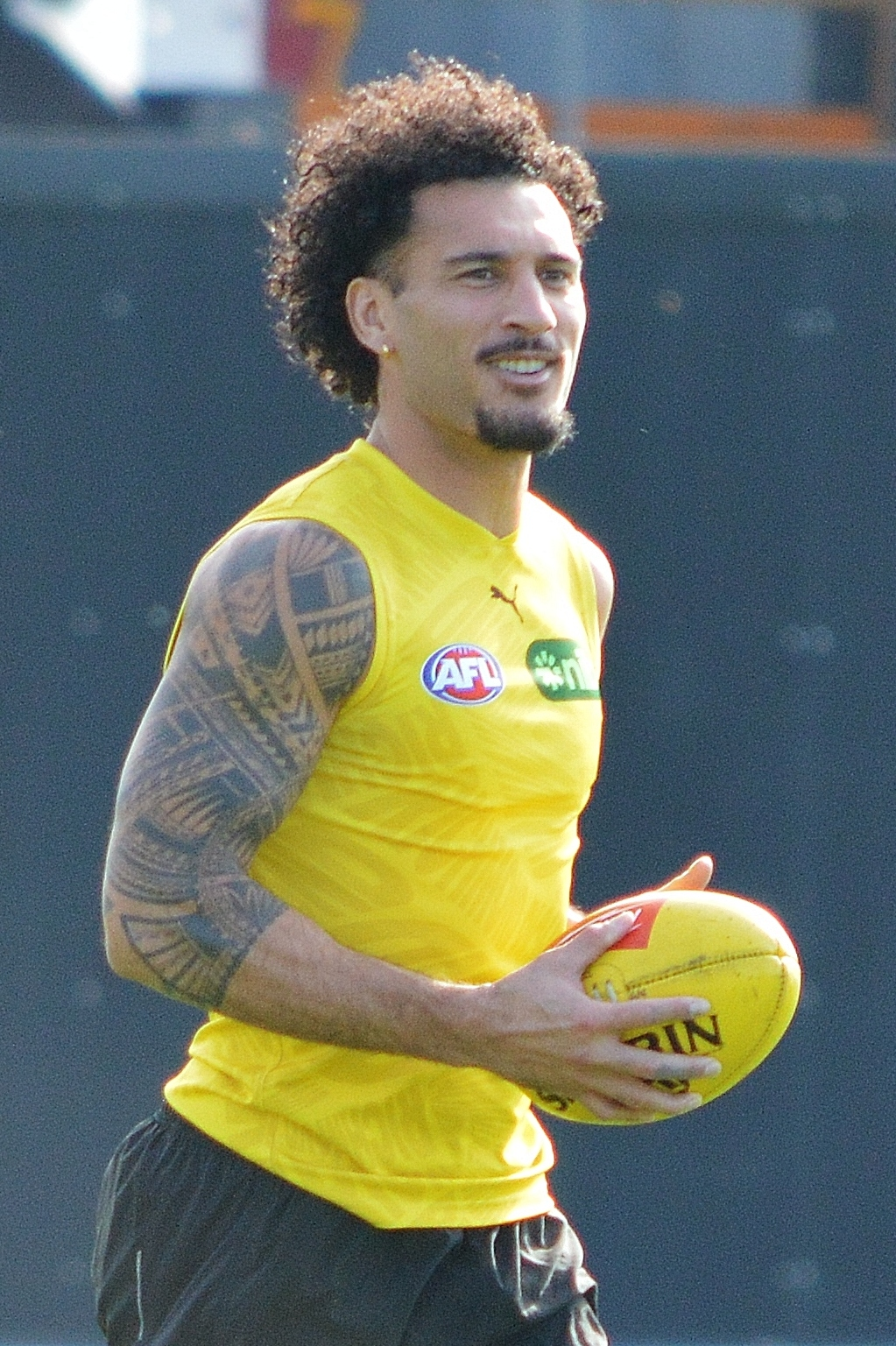
- Lefau in May 2026

Personal information
- Full name: Mykelti Lefau
- Born: 22 June 1998 (age 28); Auckland, New Zealand
- Original teams: Richmond (VFL); Casey Demons (VFL)
- Draft: 2024 pre-season supplemental selection
- Debut: Round 2, 2024, Richmond vs. Port Adelaide, at Melbourne Cricket Ground
- Height: 195 cm (6 ft 5 in)
- Weight: 94 kg (207 lb)
- Position: Key Forward

Club information
- Current club: Richmond
- Number: 42

Playing career^{1}
Years	Club	Games (Goals)
2024–	Richmond	32 (37)
- ^{1} Playing statistics correct to the end of the 2026 season.

Career highlights
- VFL Development League premiership: 2017; Richmond leading goalkicker: 2026

Mykelti Lefau (born 22 June 1998) is a professional Australian rules footballer playing for the Richmond Football Club in the Australian Football League (AFL). Lefau made his debut for Richmond in their match against Port Adelaide Football Club in round 2 of the 2024 AFL season.

== Early life ==
Lefau was born in Auckland, New Zealand to a Samoan father and New Zealander mother. Raised on rugby union, he had never heard of Australian rules football prior to moving to Australia in 2012 where he joined his father in Australia to attend year 8 of school. A talented rugby player, he was scouted by the National Rugby League team Melbourne Storm who signed him up as a "development player" being part of the club's U16 and U18 lists.

Lefau was introduced to Australian rules football in his late teens and decided to try out for the Gippsland Power however was not selected. Instead he played for the local Melbourne side St Kilda City Football Club in the Southern Football Netball League where he excelled, kicking 25 goals in one Under 19s match.

In 2016, at the age of 19, he had become an established player at the Casey Demons, the Victorian Football League (VFL) affiliate of the Melbourne Football Club, with a goal to be drafted to the AFL. He was invited to attend the AFL New Zealand Combine in April 2017 held at ASB Sports Centre, Wellington. Due to his heritage he earned selection in the New Zealand national Australian rules football team in Wellington against the AFL Academy, however his selection in the side came after the 2017 Australian Football International Cup and as such missed representing New Zealand in that tournament. He was a member of Casey's 2017 VFL Development League premiership side, kicking two goals in the grand final victory over Williamstown.

Lefau returned to the New Zealand senior side playing against the AFL National Academy in 2018 and 2019.

Lefau joined the Richmond Football Club's reserves team ahead of the 2023 VFL season.

== AFL career ==
After a consistent season in the VFL, Lefau was selected as a rookie by Richmond in the 2024 pre-season supplemental selection period. Less than a month later, he made his AFL debut in round 2, 2024 against Port Adelaide. In round 3, he kicked 2 goals against the Sydney Swans. In round 12, 2024, Lefau ruptured his ACL. He did not play for the rest of the year, and only made one senior appearance in 2025.

In February 2026, Lefau received a two-game suspension and a fine after being caught driving with a high blood alcohol reading.

In the 2026 AFL season Lefau was awarded the Michael Roach Medal as Richmond's leading goal kicker.

== Statistics ==
Updated to the end of the 2026 season.

Legend
G	Goals	K	Kicks	D	Disposals	T	Tackles
B	Behinds	H	Handballs	M	Marks

Season	Team	No.	Games	Totals							Averages (per game)							Votes
Season	Team	No.	Games	G	B	K	H	D	M	T	G	B	K	H	D	M	T	Votes
2024	Richmond	42	10	14	5	45	27	72	31	19	1.4	0.5	4.5	2.7	7.2	3.1	1.9	0
2025	Richmond	42	1	0	0	2	0	2	1	1	0.0	0.0	2.0	0.0	2.0	1.0	1.0	0
2026	Richmond	42	21	23	12	97	69	166	72	60	1.1	0.6	4.6	3.3	7.9	3.4	2.9	0
Career			32	37	17	144	96	240	104	80	1.2	0.5	4.5	3.0	7.5	3.3	2.5	0
