= Tyrell Dewar =

Personal information
- Born: 27 March 2004 (age 22)
- Original team: Mines Rovers/Subiaco
- Draft: Category B rookie signing, 2022 National draft, West Coast
- Debut: Round 9, 2024, West Coast vs. Collingwood, at Marvel Stadium
- Height: 185 cm (6 ft 1 in)
- Position: Midfielder

Club information
- Current club: West Coast
- Number: 43

Playing career^{1}
Years	Club	Games (Goals)
2023–	West Coast	23 (10)
- ^{1} Playing statistics correct to the end of the 2025 season.

Career highlights
- AFL Rising Star nominee: 2025

Tyrell Dewar (born 27 March 2004) is an Australian rules footballer who plays for the West Coast Eagles in the Australian Football League (AFL).

== Junior career ==
Dewar played junior football for the Mines Rovers Football Club. He also played for Subiaco, kicking 15 goals and averaging 12 disposals throughout 14 matches.

Dewar represented Western Australia for three games in the Under 18 Championships during 2022, averaging a goal and nine disposals a game.

Dewar was a graduate of the Naitanui Academy, the Next Generation Academy of the West Coast Eagles.

== AFL career ==
Dewar was picked up as a category B rookie by the West Coast Eagles during the 2022 AFL draft. He made his debut in round 9 of the 2024 AFL season.

In round 14 of the 2025 AFL season, Dewar had 27 disposals to earn a nomination for the 2025 AFL rising star.

== Statistics ==
Updated to the end of the 2025 season.

Legend
G	Goals	K	Kicks	D	Disposals	T	Tackles
B	Behinds	H	Handballs	M	Marks

Season	Team	No.	Games	Totals							Averages (per game)							Votes
Season	Team	No.	Games	G	B	K	H	D	M	T	G	B	K	H	D	M	T	Votes
2024	West Coast	43	7	5	2	33	21	54	19	6	0.7	0.3	4.7	3.0	7.7	2.7	0.9	0
2025	West Coast	43	16	5	5	145	59	204	54	11	0.3	0.3	9.1	3.7	12.8	3.4	0.7	0
Career			23	10	7	178	80	258	73	17	0.4	0.3	7.7	3.5	11.2	3.2	0.7	0
