= Cooper Lord =

Personal information
- Full name: Cooper Lord
- Nickname: Scoop
- Born: 20 March 2005 (age 21)
- Original team: Kew Football Club/Scotch College/Sandringham Dragons
- Draft: No. 9, 2024 mid-season rookie draft
- Debut: Round 23, 2024, Carlton vs. West Coast, at Perth Stadium
- Height: 184 cm (6 ft 0 in)
- Position: Midfielder

Club information
- Current club: Carlton
- Number: 36

Playing career^{1}
Years	Club	Games (Goals)
2024–	Carlton	34 (9)
- ^{1} Playing statistics correct to the end of the 2026 season.

Career highlights
- AFL Rising Star nominee: 2025

Cooper Lord (born 20 March 2005) is a professional Australian rules footballer who plays for the Carlton Football Club in the Australian Football League (AFL).

== Junior and VFL career ==
Lord played in the Victorian Amateur Football Association (VAFA) in 2021 and 2022 for the Kew Football Club. He also played for his school, Scotch College, where he was often used as a nullifying midfielder.

Lord then played in the Coates Talent League for the Sandringham Dragons. He was a part of Sandringham's 2023 premiership side, having 31 disposals and 5 clearances in the Coates Talent League Grand Final.

Following the 2023 AFL draft, in which Lord failed to be selected, he signed on with the North Melbourne Football Club's VFL team.

== AFL career ==
=== 2024 ===
Lord averaged 17 disposals while playing in the VFL, with his form resulting in the Carlton Football Club selecting him with pick 9 of the 2024 mid-season rookie draft.

After averaging over 25 disposals a game for Carlton's VFL side in 2024, Lord made his debut against the West Coast Eagles in round 23 of the 2024 AFL season. He amassed 15 disposals and 2 clearances in a 65-point win. He maintained his spot in the side for the following week against St Kilda, before being omitted ahead of Carlton's elimination final against the Brisbane Lions.

=== 2025 ===
In the pre-season following the conclusion of the 2024 AFL season Lord signed a one-year extension with Carlton.

In round 10 of the 2025 AFL season against the Sydney Swans, Lord had 19 disposals and four score involvements to earn himself a nomination for the 2025 AFL rising star.

After being the starting substitute seven times in 2025, Lord began to cement his position towards the end of the year, being used in several tagging roles, notably against Noah Anderson and Caleb Serong. In round 23 of the 2025 season against Port Adelaide, Lord, while performing a tagging role against Zak Butters, was concussed from a bump by Port Adelaide midfielder Ollie Wines, ruling him out for the final game of the season.

Lord capped off his second season playing for Carlton by receiving the Best Young Player award and Spirit of Carlton award at Carlton's John Nicholls Medal night.

=== 2026 ===
At the beginning of the 2026 AFL season, Lord signed a three-year contract extension to remain at Carlton until 2029.

In March 2026, Lord was hospitalised for four nights with a staph infection. As Lord was one of five cases over the course of 18 months, the club engaged with medical experts to determine if there was a cause for the abnormal number of infections. He made his return to football via the VFL in round 4 of the 2026 VFL season, and returned to the AFL the following week against Fremantle.

After just one game back from injury, Lord was omitted from Carlton's round 8 match-up against St Kilda. He eventually made his return to the senior side in round 19 against Collingwood. He was selected to play his first final against Melbourne in the inaugural round of wildcard finals. In his maiden final, he performed a negating role on Kysaiah Pickett, holding him to 19 touches at 31.6% disposal efficiency.

== Personal life ==
Lord attended school at Scotch College, where he became close friends with current Carlton teammate Jagga Smith. During their time at Scotch College they coached the school's Year 7a football team together.

== Statistics ==
Updated to the end of the 2026 season.

Legend
G	Goals	K	Kicks	D	Disposals	T	Tackles
B	Behinds	H	Handballs	M	Marks

Season	Team	No.	Games	Totals							Averages (per game)							Votes
Season	Team	No.	Games	G	B	K	H	D	M	T	G	B	K	H	D	M	T	Votes
2024	Carlton	36	2	0	1	10	24	34	8	9	0.0	0.5	5.0	12.0	17.0	4.0	4.5	0
2025	Carlton	36	21	5	0	157	137	294	57	82	0.2	0.0	7.5	6.5	14.0	2.7	3.9	0
2026	Carlton	36	11	4	3	126	95	221	54	26	0.4	0.3	11.5	8.6	20.1	4.9	2.4	0
Career			34	9	4	293	256	549	119	117	0.3	0.1	8.6	7.5	16.1	3.5	3.4	0
