= Clay Hall (footballer) =

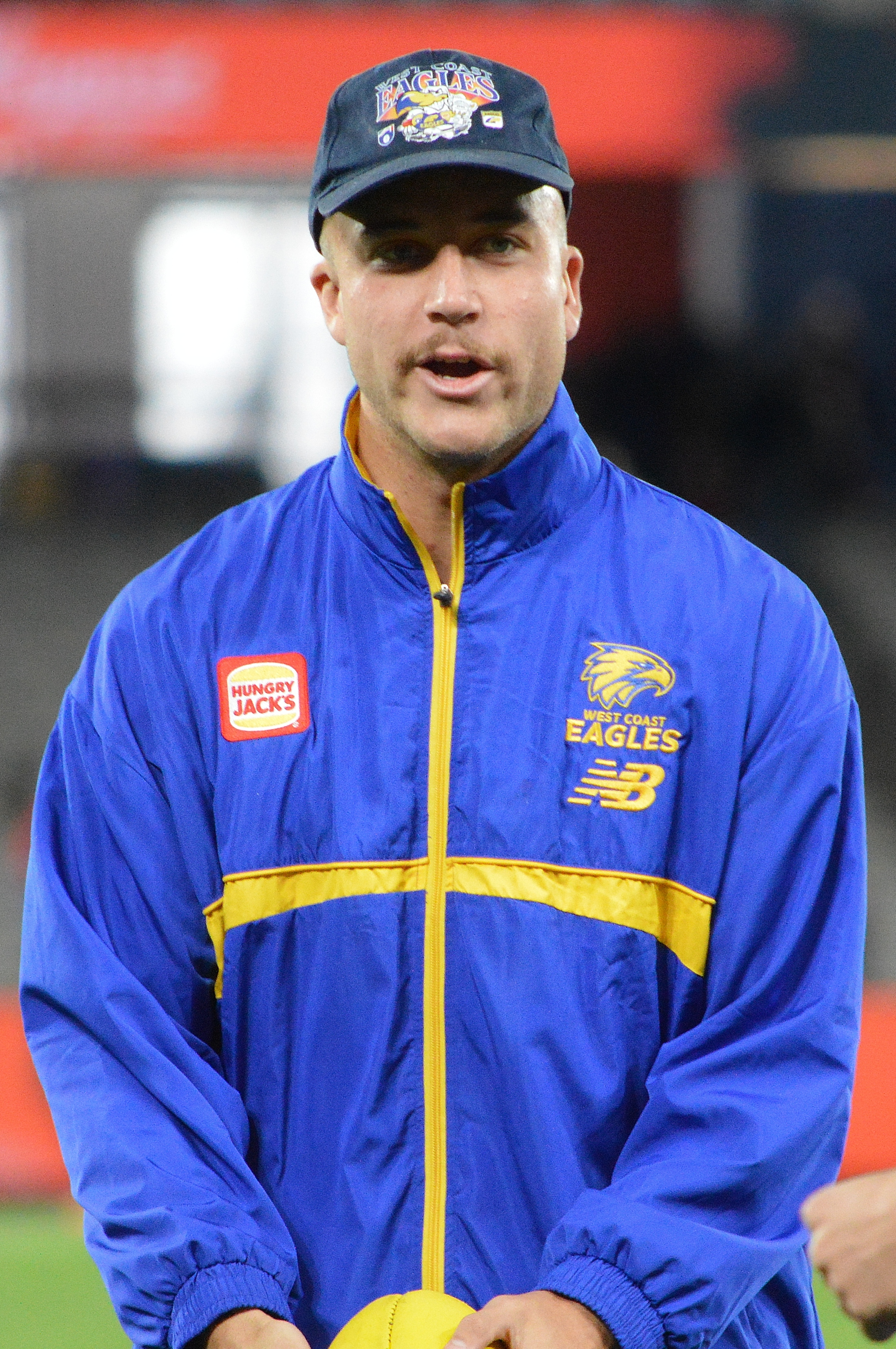
- Hall in May 2026

Personal information
- Born: 12 April 2005 (age 21)
- Original team: Harvey Brunswick Leschenault/Peel Thunder
- Draft: No. 38, 2023 AFL draft
- Height: 190 cm (6 ft 3 in)
- Position: Midfielder

Club information
- Current club: West Coast
- Number: 29

Playing career^{1}
Years	Club	Games (Goals)
2024–2026	West Coast	16 (2)
- ^{1} Playing statistics correct to the end of the 2025 season.

Career highlights
- AFL Rising Star nominee: 2025; West Coast Eagles Emerging Talent Award: 2025

Clay Hall (born 12 May 2005) is a professional Australian rules footballer playing for the West Coast Eagles in the Australian Football League (AFL).

Hall was selected with pick 38 in the 2023 AFL draft, recruited from Peel Thunder. He made his debut in round 21 of the 2024 AFL season against Gold Coast.

Hall was nominated for the 2025 AFL Rising Star for his Round 16 performance against Collingwood.

He is the son of AFL footballer Derek Hall.

== Statistics ==
Updated to the end of the 2025 season.

Legend
G	Goals	K	Kicks	D	Disposals	T	Tackles
B	Behinds	H	Handballs	M	Marks

Season	Team	No.	Games	Totals							Averages (per game)							Votes
Season	Team	No.	Games	G	B	K	H	D	M	T	G	B	K	H	D	M	T	Votes
2024	West Coast	29	3	0	3	17	10	27	6	2	0.0	1.0	5.7	3.3	9.0	2.0	0.7	0
2025	West Coast	29	13	2	3	83	128	211	29	37	0.2	0.2	6.4	9.8	16.2	2.2	2.8	0
Career			16	2	6	100	138	238	35	39	0.1	0.4	6.3	8.6	14.9	2.2	2.4	0
