= Ashton Moir =

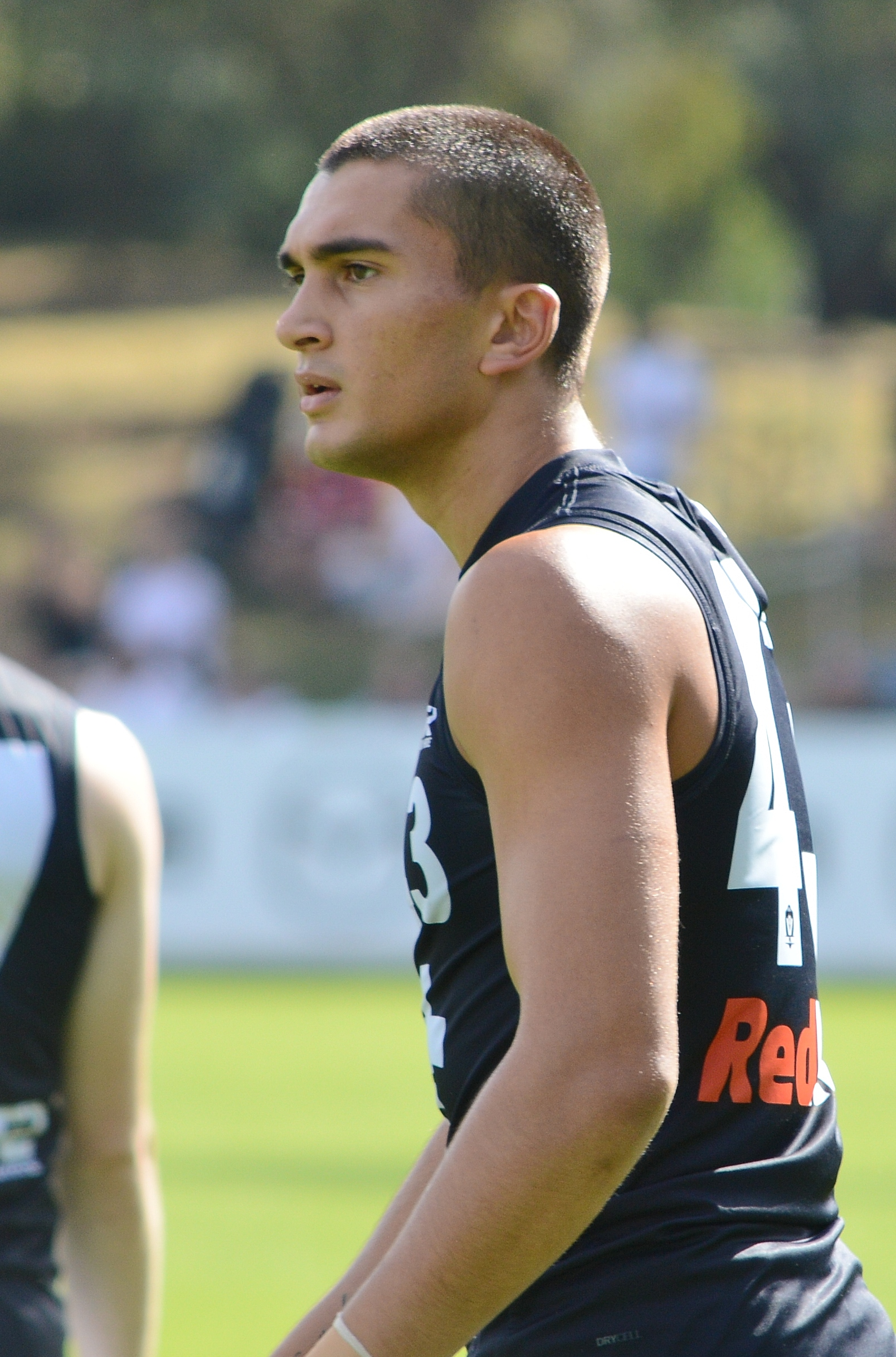
- Moir with Carlton's VFL side in April 2025

Personal information
- Born: 15 April 2005 (age 21)
- Original team: Plympton/Sacred Heart College/Glenelg
- Draft: No. 29, 2023 AFL draft
- Debut: Round 23, 2024, Carlton vs. West Coast, at Perth Stadium
- Height: 188 cm (6 ft 2 in)
- Weight: 85 kg (187 lb)
- Position: Forward

Club information
- Current club: Carlton
- Number: 43

Playing career^{1}
Years	Club	Games (Goals)
2024–	Carlton	13 (15)
- ^{1} Playing statistics correct to the end of round 22, 2026.

Career highlights
- AFL Rising Star nominee: 2025

Ashton Moir (born 15 April 2005) is an Australian rules footballer who plays for the Carlton Football Club in the Australian Football League (AFL).

== Junior career ==
Moir played junior football at Plympton in the Adelaide Footy League. He also represented his school, Sacred Heart College, winning a premiership with them in 2022.

Moir played for Glenelg at under 18 level. As a bottom ager, he kicked 30 goals in ten games, as well as a four-goal haul representing South Australia against Western Australia. In 2023, Moir struggled with persistent injuries, which saw his form drop.

== AFL career ==
Moir was taken by Carlton with pick 29 in the 2023 AFL draft. He made his debut in round 23 of the 2024 AFL season. Starting the game as the sub, he came onto the ground in the final quarter, kicking an unlikely goal out of mid-air which won him a nomination for the 2024 AFL goal of the year.

In round 19 of the 2025 AFL season Moir kicked four goals to earn himself a nomination for the 2025 AFL rising star.

In July 2025, Moir signed a two-year contract extension to the end of 2027.

== Personal life ==
Moir is of Burmese descent on his mother's side. His mother Cynthia Cameron represented Australia in the 2000 Olympics for Taekwondo.

== Statistics ==
Updated to the end of round 22, 2026.

Legend
G	Goals	K	Kicks	D	Disposals	T	Tackles
B	Behinds	H	Handballs	M	Marks

Season	Team	No.	Games	Totals							Averages (per game)							Votes
Season	Team	No.	Games	G	B	K	H	D	M	T	G	B	K	H	D	M	T	Votes
2024	Carlton	43	2	2	1	5	3	8	3	3	1.0	0.5	2.5	1.5	4.0	1.5	1.5	0
2025	Carlton	43	9	10	6	47	28	75	26	10	1.1	0.7	5.2	3.1	8.3	2.9	1.1	0
2026	Carlton	43	2	3	0	10	7	17	5	4	1.5	0.0	5.0	3.5	8.5	2.5	2.0	0
Career			13	15	7	62	38	100	34	17	1.2	0.5	4.8	2.9	7.7	2.6	1.3	0
