= Murphy Reid =

Australian rules footballer

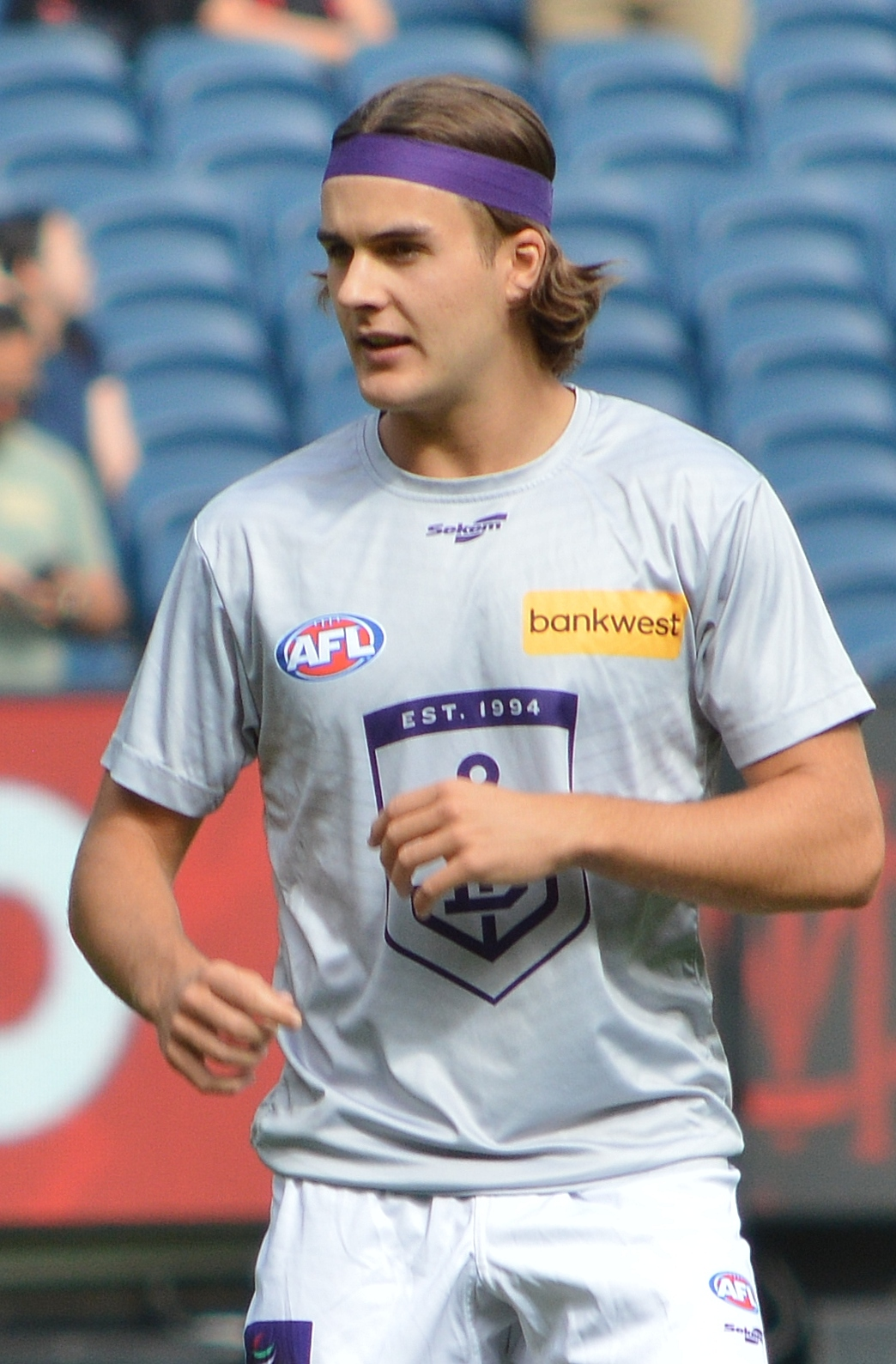
- Reid in April 2025

Personal information
- Nicknames: Bruce, Brucey
- Born: 30 July 2006 (age 20)
- Original team: Sandringham Dragons/South Melbourne Districts/Caulfield Grammar
- Draft: No. 17, 2024 national draft
- Debut: Round 1, 2025, Fremantle vs. Geelong, at GMHBA Stadium
- Height: 181 cm (5 ft 11 in)
- Weight: 77 kg (170 lb)
- Position: Midfielder / Forward

Club information
- Current club: Fremantle
- Number: 16

Playing career^{1}
| Years | Club | Games (Goals) |
| 2025– | Fremantle | 48 (37) |
- ^{1} Playing statistics correct to the end of the preliminary final, 2026.

Career highlights
- AFL Rising Star: 2025; All-Australian team: 2026; Glendinning–Allan Medalist (Round 20, 2026); AFLPA Best First Year Player: 2025; AFL Rising Star nominee: 2025; 2x 22under22 team: 2025, 2026; AFLCA Best Emerging Player: 2026; Beacon Award: 2025

Murphy Reid (born 30 July 2006) is a professional Australian rules footballer playing for the Fremantle Football Club in the Australian Football League (AFL).

== Early career ==
In the Talent League Reid played for Sandringham Dragons, winning the 2023 and 2024 premierships. In 2024, Reid impressed for Vic Metro in the AFL U18 Championships where he averaged 24.5 disposals, won the best and fairest, and earned All-Australian honours. In his younger years he played community football for South Melbourne Districts in the South Metro Junior Football League.

== AFL career ==
=== Fremantle (2025–) ===
==== 2025 season ====
Taken with Fremantle's first selection at pick 17 in the 2024 national draft, Reid was named to become the first player to wear the number 16 guernsey after the retirement of club games record holder David Mundy in 2022. Reid impressed in the pre-season intraclub match kicking a goal and showing composure with the ball in hand. One of the more impressive moments of the game for Reid was when he evaded two tacklers at a centre bounce and then gave the ball to teammate Caleb Serong for a running goal on the edge of the centre square.

Reid was named to make his debut in round one of the 2025 AFL season, against Geelong at GMHBA Stadium. Playing as a half-forward, he kicked four goals in a row in the space of six minutes during the third quarter, with his tally being an equal game-high. Reid was awarded a 2025 AFL Rising Star nomination for his effort in round six against Melbourne at the MCG, collecting 17 disposals, eight score involvements, six inside-50s and kicking a goal during the match.

After a Round 11 match in which he scored four goals from 18 disposals, Fox Footy commentator and former St Kilda wingman Leigh Montagna named him as his favourite for the 2025 Telstra AFL Rising Star Award. Reid finished the season after playing every game including the Elimination Final loss to Gold Coast. Reid was recognised for his debut season by winning the AFLPA Best First Year Player. Reid also broke an AFL record during his first season in the competition, recording the most score assists and goals scored by a first year player with 35 score assists and 25 goals. This record was previously held by Hawthorn great, Cyril Rioli.

Reid completed his impressive first season in the league by winning the Rising Star award, receiving 48 votes, and would also be awarded the Beacon Award at the Doig Medal ceremony as Fremantle's best first year player.

==== 2026 season ====
Reid started the year strong with at least 19 disposals in each of the first 4 games. During this period, Reid recorded his highest disposals of his career thus far with an important 26 gathered in Round 4's 2 point win against Adelaide. In Round 20, he was awarded the Glendinning-Allan Medal for a best-on-ground performance in Western Derby 63, recording 26 disposals and kicking a goal.

Reid's impressive second season was rewarded by jointly winning the AFLCA Best Emerging Player Award (formally known as the Best Young Player Award), alongside St Kilda's Max Hall on 66 votes, as well as earning his first All-Australian blazer, named on the interchange.

== Statistics ==
Updated to the end of the preliminary final, 2026.

Legend
| G | Goals | K | Kicks | D | Disposals | T | Tackles |
| B | Behinds | H | Handballs | M | Marks |

| Season | Team | No. | Games | Totals | | | | | | | Averages (per game) | | | | | | | Votes |
| Season | Team | No. | Games | G | B | K | H | D | M | T | G | B | K | H | D | M | T | Votes |
|---|---|---|---|---|---|---|---|---|---|---|---|---|---|---|---|---|---|---|
| 2025 | Fremantle | 16 | 24 | 25 | 18 | 188 | 159 | 347 | 49 | 47 | 1.0 | 0.8 | 7.8 | 6.6 | 14.5 | 2.0 | 2.0 | 1 |
| 2026 | Fremantle | 16 | 24 | 12 | 20 | 289 | 270 | 559 | 77 | 48 | 0.5 | 0.8 | 12.0 | 11.3 | 23.3 | 3.2 | 2.0 | 15 |
| Career | | | 48 | 37 | 38 | 477 | 429 | 906 | 126 | 95 | 0.8 | 0.8 | 9.9 | 8.9 | 18.9 | 2.6 | 2.0 | 16 |
