= Archie Roberts (Australian footballer, born 2005) =

Australian rules footballer

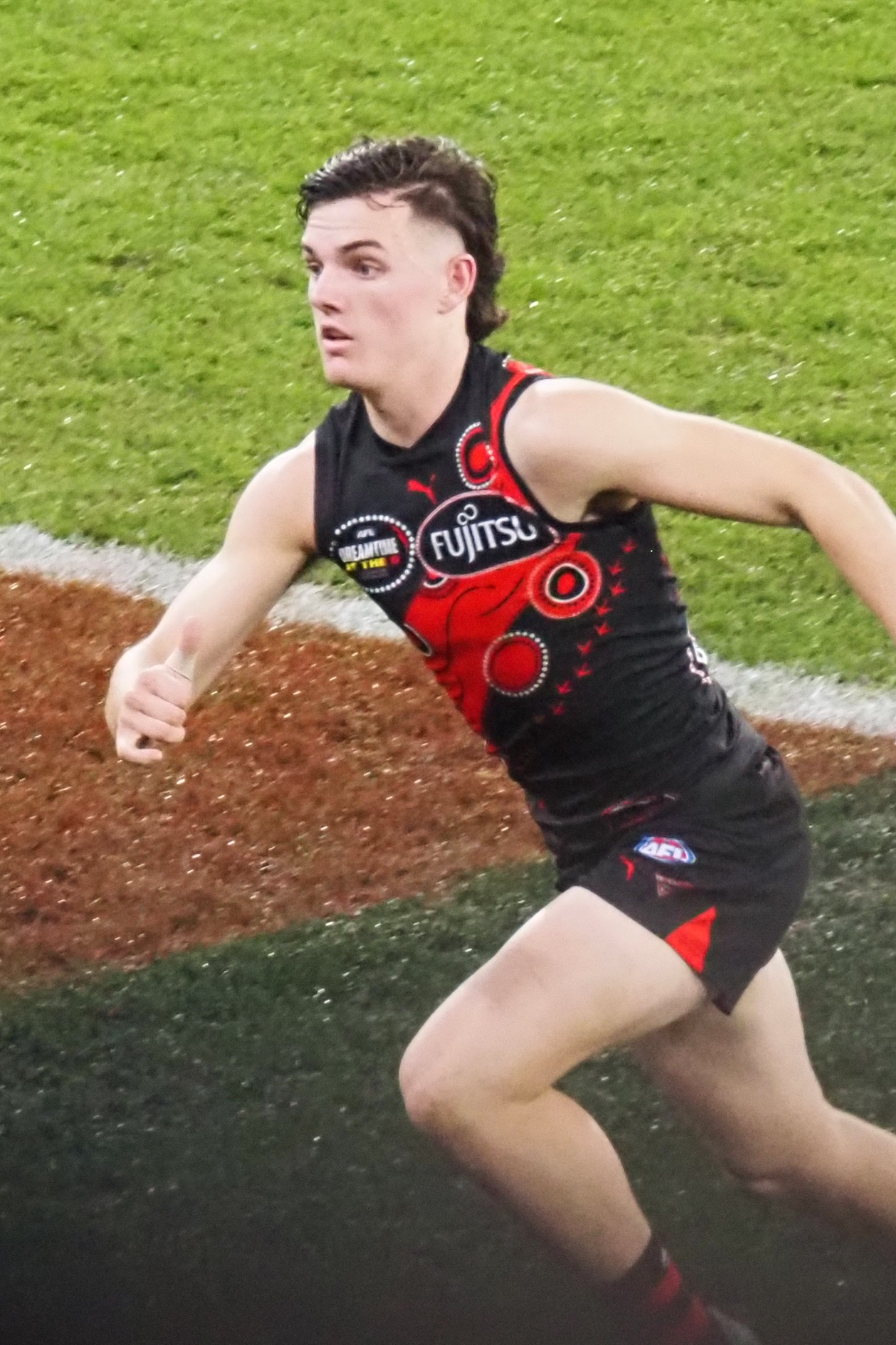
- Roberts playing for Essendon in 2025

Personal information
- Full name: Archie Roberts
- Born: 18 November 2005 (age 20)
- Original team: Sandringham Dragons (Talent League)/Hampton Rovers
- Draft: No. 54, 2023 national draft
- Debut: Round 21, 2024, Essendon vs. Fremantle, at MCG
- Height: 184 cm (6 ft 0 in)
- Position: Defender

Club information
- Current club: Essendon
- Number: 21

Playing career^{1}
Years	Club	Games (Goals)
2024–	Essendon	46 (5)
- ^{1} Playing statistics correct to the end of round 22, 2026.

Career highlights
- AFL Rising Star nominee: 2025; 22under22 team: 2026

Archie Roberts (born 18 November 2005) is a professional Australian rules footballer with the Essendon Football Club in the Australian Football League (AFL).

== Early football and AFL career ==
Roberts was drafted by Essendon with pick 54 in the 2023 national draft from Talent League side Sandringham Dragons. Growing up he supported Carlton and played junior football for local club Hampton Rovers in the South Metro Junior Football League. He also played school football for Haileybury College under Australian Football Hall of Famer and Essendon legend Matthew Lloyd.

Roberts made his AFL debut for Essendon in round 21 of his first season, against Fremantle at Melbourne Cricket Ground. Roberts played four senior games in his first season, along with 14 VFL matches prior to his AFL debut. Roberts rounded out his debut season by signing a contract extension, which saw an extra year added to his standard two year draftee contract, tying him to the club until the end of 2026.

Ahead of the 2025 season, Roberts' second in the AFL, Roberts was chosen to take on retired Essendon champion Dyson Heppell's former guernsey number 21, moving up from the 38 he wore in his debut season. 2025 turned out to be Roberts' breakout season, with a highlight coming in round 5, when Roberts had 28 disposals in a 39-point victory over Melbourne, earning a Rising Star nomination for his performance. Roberts finished the season as fourth favourite for the Rising Star award, and was rewarded with a further contract extension until the end of 2028, despite already being contracted for 2026.

== Statistics ==
Updated to the end of round 22, 2026.

Legend
G	Goals	K	Kicks	D	Disposals	T	Tackles
B	Behinds	H	Handballs	M	Marks

Season	Team	No.	Games	Totals							Averages (per game)							Votes
Season	Team	No.	Games	G	B	K	H	D	M	T	G	B	K	H	D	M	T	Votes
2024	Essendon	38	4	1	0	47	40	87	21	12	0.3	0.0	11.8	10.0	21.8	5.3	3.0	0
2025	Essendon	21	23	2	3	304	259	563	122	52	0.1	0.1	13.2	11.3	24.5	5.3	2.3	0
2026	Essendon	21	19	2	2	370	165	535	104	22	0.1	0.1	19.5	8.7	28.2	5.5	1.2	0
Career			46	5	5	721	464	1185	247	86	0.1	0.1	15.7	10.1	25.8	5.4	1.9	0
