= Hugo Garcia (Australian footballer) =

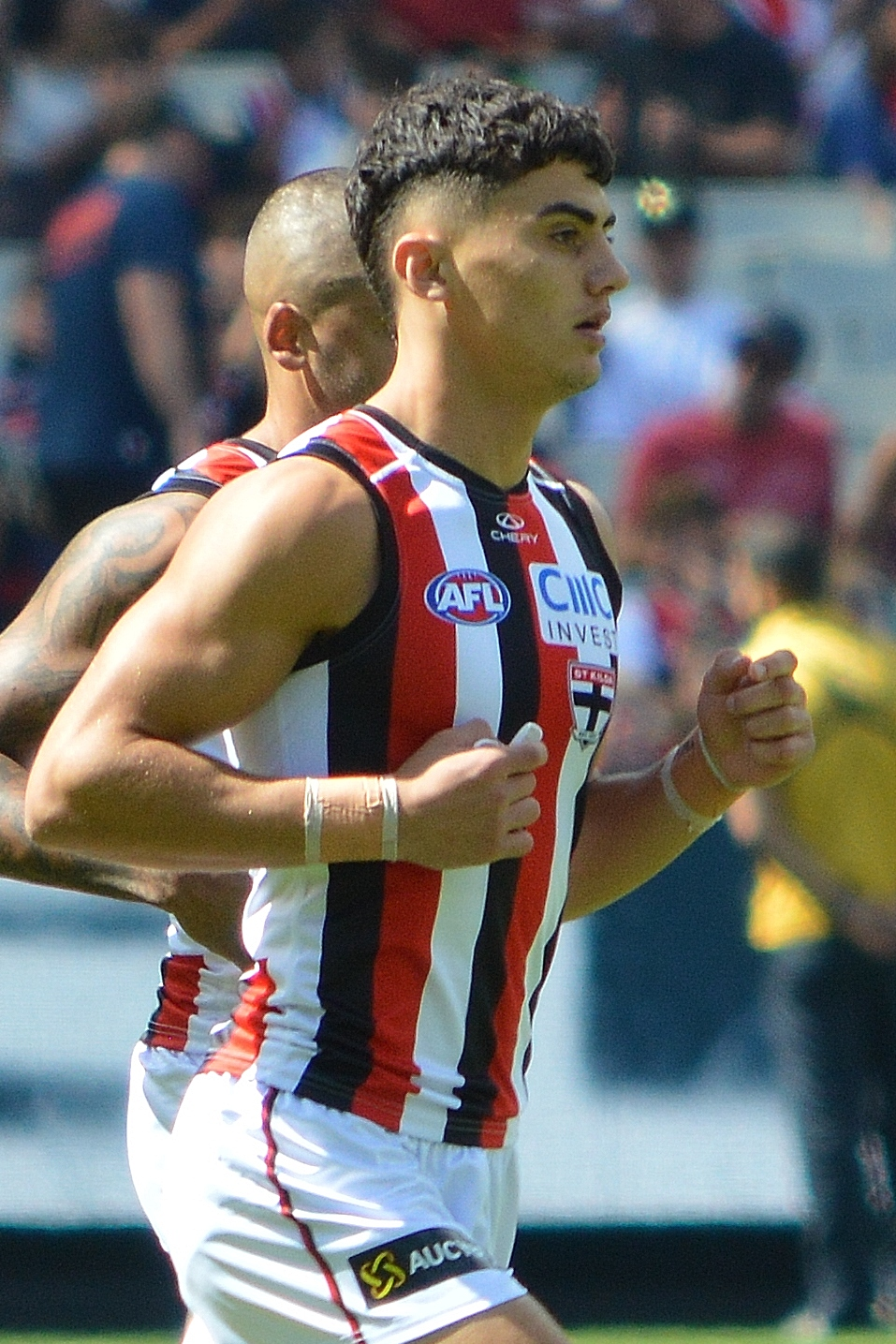
- Garcia in March 2026

Personal information
- Born: 22 May 2005 (age 21)
- Original teams: Calder Cannons (Talent League); Greenvale (EDFL)
- Draft: No. 50, 2023 AFL draft
- Debut: Round 5, 2024, St Kilda vs. Greater Western Sydney, at Manuka Oval
- Height: 185 cm (6 ft 1 in)
- Weight: 78 kg (172 lb)
- Position: Midfielder

Club information
- Current club: St Kilda
- Number: 34

Playing career^{1}
Years	Club	Games (Goals)
2024-	St Kilda	49 (16)
- ^{1} Playing statistics correct to the end of 2026.

Career highlights
- AFL Rising Star nominee: 2025

Hugo Garcia is an Australian rules footballer who plays for the St Kilda Football Club in the Australian Football League (AFL).

== Early life ==
Garcia attended the private Catholic school Assumption College in Kilmore, Victoria. He is of Spanish and Italian descent.

He played for the Greenvale Football Club in the Essendon District Football League (EDFL) at a junior level and represented the Calder Cannons in the Talent League in his draft year.

== AFL career ==
Garcia was taken by St Kilda with pick 50 of the 2023 national draft. He made his debut against Greater Western Sydney, coming on as the substitute late in the game and making an impact with 11 possessions.

He had a strong second year with the Saints in 2025, playing primarily as a midfielder. In round seven, Garcia was substituted early in the match by coach Ross Lyon as a strategic reaction to what was becoming a big loss to Brisbane Lions. The following week, Garcia responded by collecting 19 disposals and a goal against Fremantle, which earnt him a nomination for the 2025 AFL Rising Star award.

== Statistics ==
Updated to the end of round 22, 2026.

Legend
G	Goals	K	Kicks	D	Disposals	T	Tackles
B	Behinds	H	Handballs	M	Marks

Season	Team	No.	Games	Totals							Averages (per game)							Votes
Season	Team	No.	Games	G	B	K	H	D	M	T	G	B	K	H	D	M	T	Votes
2024	St Kilda	34	9	1	1	25	45	70	9	40	0.1	0.1	2.8	5.0	7.8	1.0	4.4	0
2025	St Kilda	34	17	4	7	145	121	266	28	93	0.2	0.4	8.5	7.1	15.6	1.6	5.5	1
2026	St Kilda	34	21	9	7	212	272	484	50	111	0.4	0.3	10.1	13.0	23.0	2.4	5.3	0
Career			47	14	15	382	438	820	87	244	0.3	0.3	8.1	9.3	17.4	1.9	5.2	1
