= Joe Fonti =

Australian rules footballer

Joseph Fonti

Personal information
- Full name: Joseph Fonti
- Nicknames: Font, Fontempelli
- Born: 24 December 2004 (age 21)
- Original team: East Fremantle JFC/Claremont (WAFL)
- Draft: No. 44, 2023 national draft: Greater Western Sydney
- Debut: Round 17, 2024, Greater Western Sydney vs. Carlton, at Sydney Showground
- Height: 189 cm (6 ft 2 in)
- Weight: 73 kg (161 lb)
- Position: Defender

Club information
- Current club: Greater Western Sydney
- Number: 37

Playing career^{1}
Years	Club	Games (Goals)
2024–	Greater Western Sydney	42 (2)
- ^{1} Playing statistics correct to the end of round 22, 2026.

Career highlights
- AFL Rising Star nominee: 2025

Joseph Fonti (born 24 December 2004) is a professional Australian rules footballer for the Greater Western Sydney Giants in the Australian Football League (AFL).

== Early life ==
Fonti grew up supporting the Fremantle Football Club. He is a cousin of West Coast AFLW player Ella Roberts.

== AFL career ==
Fonti was recruited by Greater Western Sydney with the 44th overall selection in the 2023 national draft.

Fonti debuted for GWS in round 17 of the 2024 AFL season in a 12-point win against Carlton.

In round 20 of the 2025 AFL season, Fonti received a nomination for the 2025 AFL Rising Star.

== Statistics ==
Updated to the end of round 22, 2026.

Legend
G	Goals	K	Kicks	D	Disposals	T	Tackles
B	Behinds	H	Handballs	M	Marks

Season	Team	No.	Games	Totals							Averages (per game)							Votes
Season	Team	No.	Games	G	B	K	H	D	M	T	G	B	K	H	D	M	T	Votes
2024	Greater Western Sydney	37	5	0	0	18	31	49	8	6	0.0	0.0	3.6	6.2	9.8	1.6	1.2	0
2025	Greater Western Sydney	37	17	0	0	108	91	199	63	48	0.0	0.0	6.4	5.4	11.7	3.7	2.8	0
2026	Greater Western Sydney	37	20	2	0	206	145	351	127	54	0.1	0.0	10.3	7.3	17.6	6.4	2.7	0
Career			42	2	0	332	267	599	198	108	0.0	0.0	7.9	6.4	14.3	4.7	2.6	0
