= Ed Allan =

Australian rules footballer (born 2004)

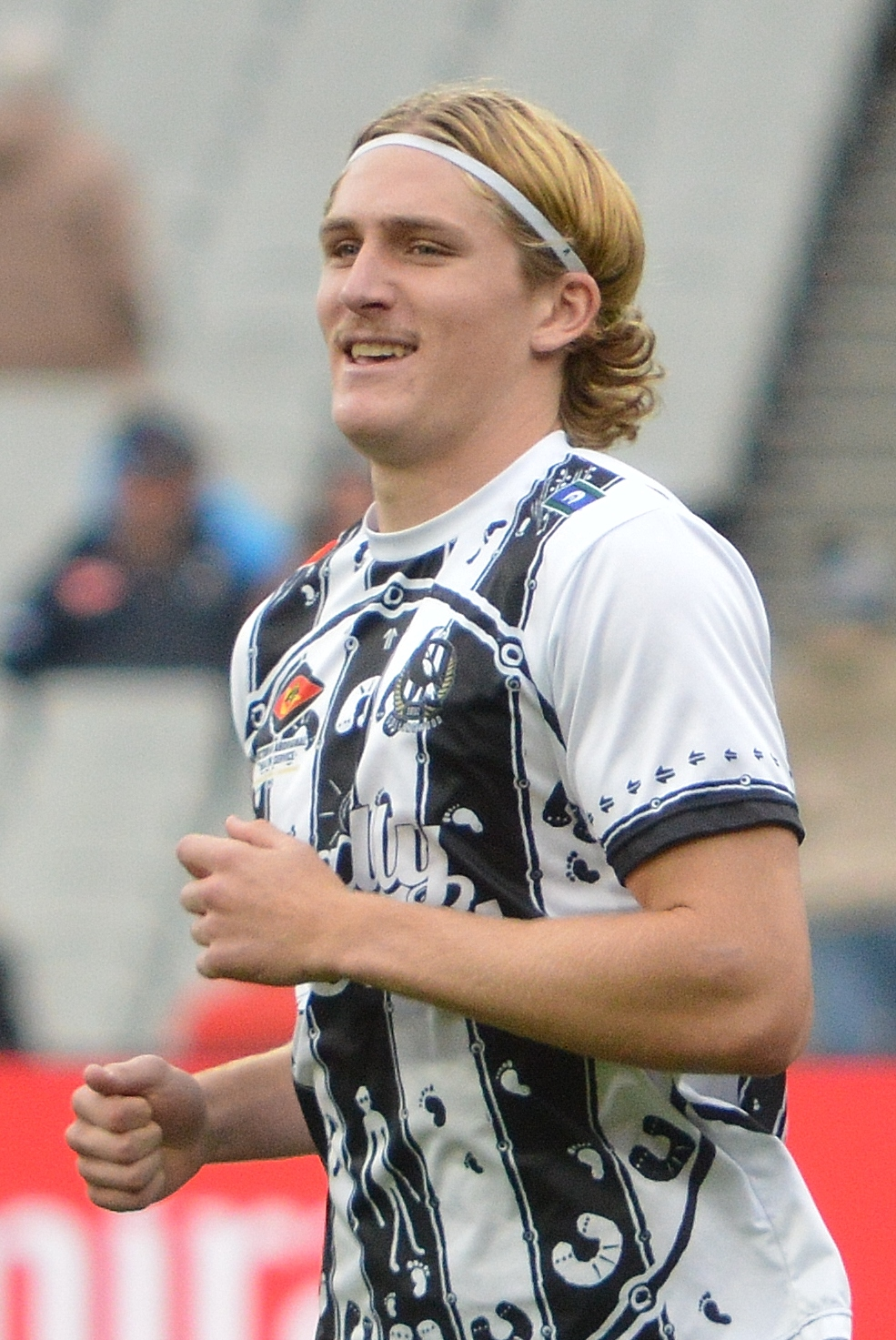
- Allan in May 2025

Personal information
- Full name: Edward Allan
- Born: 26 May 2004 (age 22)
- Original team: Claremont
- Draft: No. 19, 2022 AFL draft
- Debut: 24 May 2024, Collingwood vs. Fremantle, at Optus Stadium
- Height: 194 cm (6 ft 4 in)
- Weight: 82 kg (181 lb)
- Position: Midfielder

Club information
- Current club: Collingwood
- Number: 16

Playing career^{1}
Years	Club	Games (Goals)
2023–	Collingwood	34 (8)
- ^{1} Playing statistics correct to the end of the 2026 season.

Career highlights
- AFL Rising Star nominee: 2025

Edward Allan is an Australian rules footballer who plays for the Collingwood Football Club in the Australian Football League (AFL).

== AFL career ==
Allan was drafted by Collingwood with pick 19 of the 2022 AFL draft. He is the son of former Claremont, Hawthorn and Fremantle player Ben Allan.

After playing the entire 2023 season for Collingwood's team in the Victorian Football League (VFL), he made his AFL debut against his father's former team Fremantle in round 11 of the 2024 season.

Allan earned a nomination for the 2025 AFL Rising Star after his round 12 performance against Hawthorn, in which he had 23 possessions.

== Statistics ==
Updated to the end of round 22, 2026.

Legend
G	Goals	K	Kicks	D	Disposals	T	Tackles
B	Behinds	H	Handballs	M	Marks

Season	Team	No.	Games	Totals							Averages (per game)							Votes
Season	Team	No.	Games	G	B	K	H	D	M	T	G	B	K	H	D	M	T	Votes
2023	Collingwood	16	0	—	—	—	—	—	—	—	—	—	—	—	—	—	—	0
2024	Collingwood	16	2	1	0	14	14	28	1	8	0.5	0.0	7.0	7.0	14.0	0.5	4.0	0
2025	Collingwood	16	13	1	4	70	101	171	33	29	0.1	0.3	5.4	7.8	13.2	2.5	2.2	0
2026	Collingwood	16	16	4	5	106	145	251	24	79	0.3	0.3	6.6	9.1	15.7	1.5	4.9	0
Career			31	6	9	190	260	450	58	116	0.2	0.3	6.1	8.4	14.5	1.9	3.7	0
