= Connor O'Sullivan =

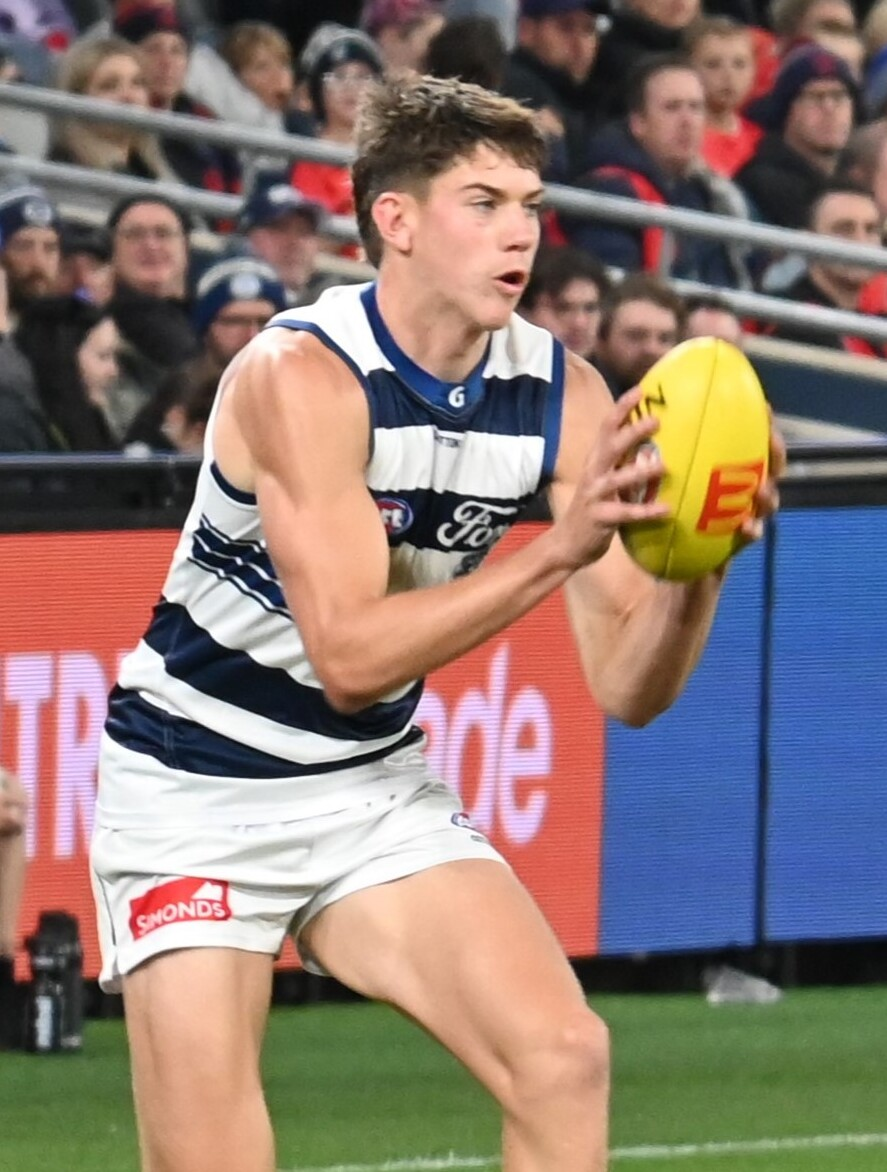
- O'Sullivan in April 2025

Personal information
- Born: 19 May 2005 (age 21)
- Original team: Murray Bushrangers/Albury Tigers
- Draft: No. 11, 2023 AFL draft
- Debut: Round 5, 2024, Geelong vs. North Melbourne, at Kardinia Park
- Height: 198 cm (6 ft 6 in)
- Weight: 92 kg (203 lb)
- Position: Key defender

Club information
- Current club: Geelong
- Number: 14

Playing career^{1}
Years	Club	Games (Goals)
2024–	Geelong	51 (1)
- ^{1} Playing statistics correct to the end of 2026.

Career highlights
- AFL Rising Star nominee: 2025; Geelong Best Young Player Award: 2025; 22under22 team: 2026

Connor O'Sullivan is an Australian rules footballer who plays for the Geelong Football Club in the Australian Football League (AFL).

O'Sullivan, a backman who played for Murray Bushrangers, was picked by Geelong with pick 11 of the 2023 National Draft In his younger years he played local football for Albury Tigers in the Ovens and Murray Football League and studied at Xavier High School. He made his debut against North Melbourne in round 5 of the 2024 season.

In round 2 of the 2025 AFL season, O'Sullivan received a nomination for the 2025 AFL Rising Star award after having 15 disposals and 7 marks.

He wasted no time making an impression and gaining external recognition, with O'Sullivan earning his Rising Star nomination in the Round 2 clash with St Kilda collecting 15 disposals and nine intercept possessions.

O'Sullivan consistently improved throughout the 2025 season, finishing among the top three at Geelong for intercept marks, contested marks, spoils, and intercept possessions. The young defender’s rapid development was further recognized as he placed in the top five for the 2025 AFL Rising Star award.

== Statistics ==
Updated to the end of round 22, 2026.

Legend
G	Goals	K	Kicks	D	Disposals	T	Tackles
B	Behinds	H	Handballs	M	Marks

Season	Team	No.	Games	Totals							Averages (per game)							Votes
Season	Team	No.	Games	G	B	K	H	D	M	T	G	B	K	H	D	M	T	Votes
2024	Geelong	14	1	0	1	3	8	11	3	1	0.0	1.0	3.0	8.0	11.0	3.0	1.0	0
2025	Geelong	14	25	0	0	179	135	314	144	46	0.0	0.0	7.2	5.4	12.6	5.8	1.8	0
2026	Geelong	14	25	1	2	229	147	376	165	41	0.0	0.1	9.2	5.9	15.0	6.6	1.6	0
Career			51	1	3	411	290	701	312	88	0.0	0.1	8.1	5.7	13.8	6.1	1.7	0
