= Nate Caddy =

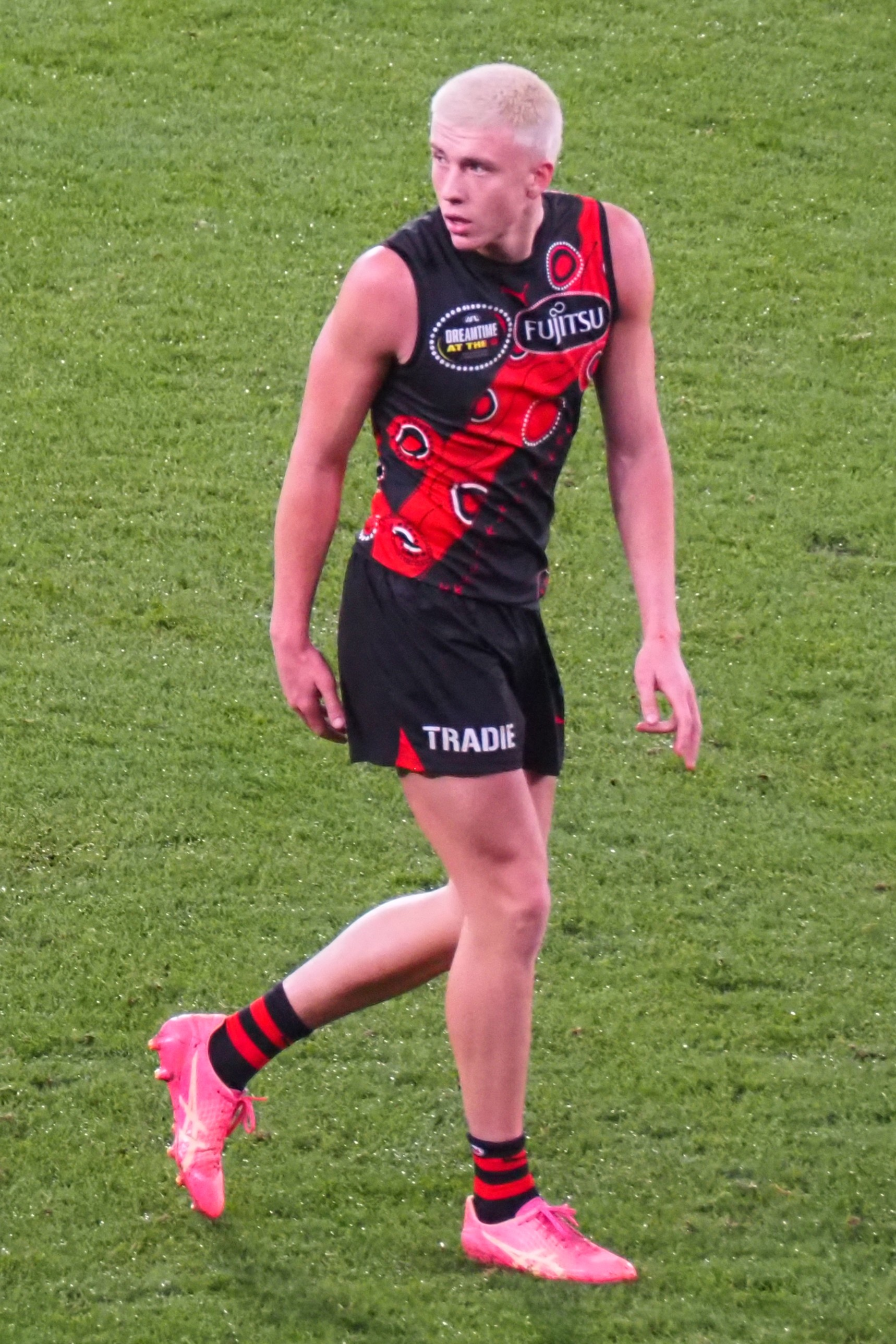
- Caddy playing for Essendon in 2025

Personal information
- Born: 14 July 2005 (age 21)
- Original team: Northern Knights
- Draft: No. 10, 2023 national draft
- Debut: 25 May 2024, Essendon vs. Richmond, at MCG
- Height: 193 cm (6 ft 4 in)
- Weight: 88 kg (194 lb)
- Position: Forward

Club information
- Current club: Essendon
- Number: 30

Playing career^{1}
Years	Club	Games (Goals)
2024–	Essendon	49 (75)
- ^{1} Playing statistics correct to the end of the 2026 season.

Career highlights
- Essendon leading goalkicker: 2026; 2× AFL Rising Star nominee: 2024, 2025; 2x 22under22 team: 2025, 2026

Nate Caddy (born 14 July 2005) is an Australian rules footballer who plays for the Essendon Football Club in the Australian Football League (AFL).

Caddy is the nephew of Josh Caddy, former player with Gold Coast, Geelong and Richmond. His cousin is current Hawthorn player Ned Reeves.

He grew up in Yarrambat and attended Parade College. He played junior football for Yarrambat Junior Football Club in the Northern Football League.

== AFL career ==
Caddy was picked by Essendon with pick 10 of the 2023 national draft. He made his debut against Richmond in the Dreamtime at the 'G game in round 11 of the 2024 season.

After a promising start to his career, towards the end of his second season at the club in 2025, Caddy signed a contract extension to remain at Essendon until the end of 2028. A year later, Caddy extended that contract further until the end of 2031. In Round 19 of the 2026 season in a match against Greater Western Sydney, Caddy left the field in the first quarter in discomfort, and was subsequently sent to hospital over concerns about an elevated heart rate. However, after assessment at hospital, Caddy was discharged that evening and cleared to train and play the following week.

== Statistics ==
Updated to the end of round 22, 2026.

Legend
G	Goals	K	Kicks	D	Disposals	T	Tackles
B	Behinds	H	Handballs	M	Marks

Season	Team	No.	Games	Totals							Averages (per game)							Votes
Season	Team	No.	Games	G	B	K	H	D	M	T	G	B	K	H	D	M	T	Votes
2024	Essendon	30	10	9	11	72	37	109	40	14	0.9	1.1	7.2	3.7	10.9	4.0	1.4	0
2025	Essendon	30	17	20	20	130	56	186	67	17	1.2	1.2	7.6	3.3	10.9	3.9	1.0	0
2026	Essendon	30	20	37	35	152	49	201	82	24	1.9	1.8	7.6	2.5	10.1	4.1	1.2	0
Career			47	66	66	354	142	496	189	55	1.4	1.4	7.5	3.0	10.6	4.0	1.2	0
