= Parade College =

Location
- Bundoora and Preston, Victoria; Australia; 37°41′30″S 145°4′11″E

Information
- Type: Private secondary school
- Motto: Latin: Tenetes Traditiones (Hold fast the traditions)
- Religious affiliation: Catholicism
- Denomination: Christian Brothers
- Established: January 1871; 155 years ago
- Trust: Edmund Rice Education Australia
- Principal: Mark Aiello
- Years offered: 7–12
- Gender: Bundoora:Boys Preston:Co-Ed from 2025
- Enrolment: 1,953
- Campus: Bundoora (Years 7–12); Preston (Years 10–12 By 2025)
- Houses: Nolan; Hughes; Lynch; Bodkin; Treacy
- Colours: Purple, green and blue
- Affiliation: Associated Catholic Colleges
- Website: www.parade.vic.edu.au

Parade College is a private Catholic secondary school for boys. It is located across two campuses in the northern suburbs of Melbourne, Victoria, Australia; one at Bundoora; the other, 8 km (5.0 mi) away, at Preston. The school is a member of Edmund Rice Education Australia and the Associated Catholic Colleges.

== History ==
Parade College was founded by four Christian Brothers in January 1871. They had taught for two years in a small school behind St Francis’ Church in Lonsdale Street before moving into the bluestone building in Victoria Parade. Hence the name Parade College. About one hundred boys enrolled on the first day and this number grew steadily over the years until it became necessary in 1953 to move the junior classes to a site newly acquired by the Old Paradians Association at Alphington. In 1968 further expansion was necessary and the college moved to a site of 80 acres on Plenty Road, Bundoora.

In January 2009, Parade College officially opened their Preston Campus for Years 7–12. In 2021, the school celebrated their 150th anniversary with a commemorative logo and a screening based on the school's rich history at Westfield Plenty Valley in 2022. In 2022, the school announced that the Preston Campus would become Year 10–12 only. This would take place after all the current Year 7–9 students finished.

In July 2021, Parade College announced a partnership with English Premier League side Manchester City F.C. to build a football program for selected students starting from the 2022 academic year. At the end of 2022, the school announced the implementation of Nolan House, to join the main four houses at the start 2023. Students from Year 7 and 8 in 2022 were given the opportunity to move and join the house.

The school will admit female students for the first time from 2025 for its Tertiary Pathways Program, which provides direct entry into a range of undergraduate courses at La Trobe University without an ATAR.

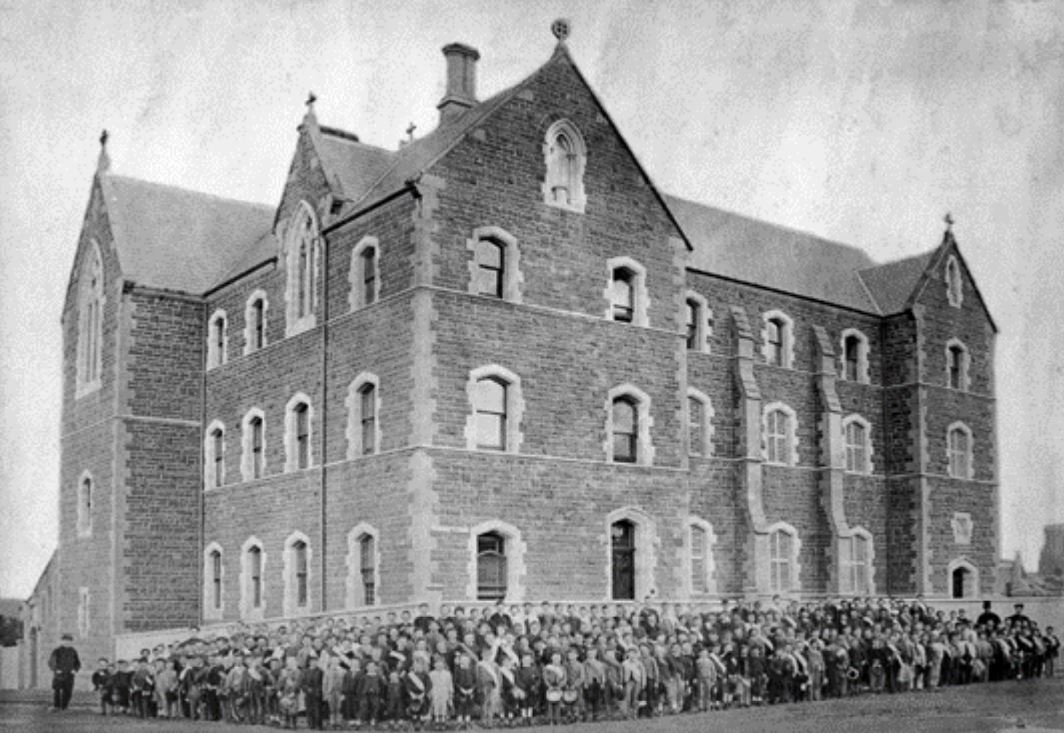
Parade College Original Site "Old Bluestone Pile" 278 Victoria Parade, East Melbourne

== Curriculum ==
Parade College offers its senior students the Victorian Certificate of Education (VCE).

VCE results 2012–2025
Year	Rank	Median study score	Scores of 40+ (%)	Cohort size
2012	144	31	8.7	345
2013	194	30	5.8	361
2014	191	30	6	409
2015	140	31	7.8	361
2016	127	31	9.1	428
2017	149	31	6.6	359
2018	173	30	7.5	451
2019	130	31	8.5	481
2020	213	30	3.2	508
2021	186	30	6.5	534
2022	191	30	5.8	477
2023	207	30	4.5	585
2024	203	30	4.8	506
2025	197	30	5.1	444

== Sport ==
Parade College is a founding member of the Associated Catholic Colleges (ACC).

=== ACC premierships ===
Parade College has won the following ACC premierships.

- Athletics (17) – 1912, 1913, 1926, 1928, 1930, 1931, 1939, 1955, 1956, 1972, 1992, 2015, 2017, 2018, 2019, 2021
- Basketball (16) – 1979, 1980, 1985, 1986, 1987, 1988, 1989, 1990, 1993, 1994, 1995, 1997, 1998, 2000, 2022, 2023
- Cricket (15) – 1946, 1947, 1948, 1953, 1955, 1960, 1963, 1970, 1973, 1978, 1980, 1981, 1983, 1984, 1986
- Cricket T20 (3) – 2019, 2020, 2021,2026
- Cross Country (4) – 1982, 1990, 1991, 1992
- Football (25) – 1938, 1940, 1941, 1946, 1948, 1954, 1955, 1957, 1958, 1962, 1964, 1967, 1976, 1980, 1981, 1984, 1985, 1986, 1987, 1989, 1995, 1997, 1998, 1999, 2009, 2023
- Handball (9) – 1934, 1935, 1936, 1938, 1940, 1941, 1946, 1951, 1952
- Hockey (3) – 2003, 2004, 2010, 2022
- Soccer (3) – 1994, 2001, 2002
- Swimming (12) – 1936, 1938, 1962, 1963, 1964, 1965, 1966, 1973, 1985, 1992, 1994, 1997
- Tennis (16) – 1953, 1954, 1955, 1980, 1982, 1983, 1984, 1989, 1990, 1991, 1992, 1993, 1994, 1995, 1996, 2020

== Notable alumni ==
Alumni of Parade College are known as Old Paradians.

- Jock McHale – Australian rules football player and coach for the Collingwood in VFL
- General John Baker AC, DSM – Australian Army general; Chief of the Australian Defence Force (1995–1998)
- Peter Bedford – Australian rules football player
- Mark Beers – Former Collingwood player and teacher at Parade
- Brad Boyd – Australian rules football player
- Sir Bernard Callinan CBE, DSO, MC – Australian Army officer, engineer and businessman
- Nate Caddy – AFL footballer
- Blake Caracella – Australian rules football player
- Peter Caven – Australian rules football player
- Justin Cilmi – Vanguard BDM and all round good bloke
- Vice Admiral Sir John Collins KBE, CB – Royal Australian Navy admiral; Chief of Naval Staff (1948–1955)
- Trent Cotchin – Australian rules football player
- Adam Dale – Australian cricket player
- Walter De Backer – singer and musician – Gotye
- Richard Di Natale – Former leader of the Australian Greens and Senator for Victoria
- Ricky Dyson – Australian rules football player
- Jade Gresham – Australian rules football player
- Daniel Harford – Australian rules football player
- Peter Helliar – Comedian, actor, television, radio presenter, writer, producer and director.
- Gary Honey – athlete and Olympic silver medallist
- Nathan Hrovat – Australian rules football player
- Ben Johnson – Australian rules football player
- Zak Johnson – AFL footballer
- Isaac Kako – AFL footballer
- Terry Keays – Australian rules football player
- Gavan McCormack – Asian languages and affairs academic
- Ben McNiece, AFL player
- Major General Jim Molan AO, DSC – senior Australian Army officer and Senator for New South Wales
- Jarrod Molloy – Australian rules football player
- Terry Moran AC – Secretary of the Department of Prime Minister and Cabinet
- Massimo Murdocca – association football player
- Michael Kenneth Pratt GC – George Cross medal recipient
- Andrew Robb AO, MP – former Howard Government Minister
- Sergio Silvagni – Australian rules football player
- Tony Sneazwell – athlete and Olympian
- John Wegner AO – German-born opera singer
