= List of Brighton Grammar School people =

This is a list of notable past students and staff of Brighton Grammar School. Alumni of the school are known as "Old Brighton Grammarians".

== Alumni ==
=== Arts and entertainment ===
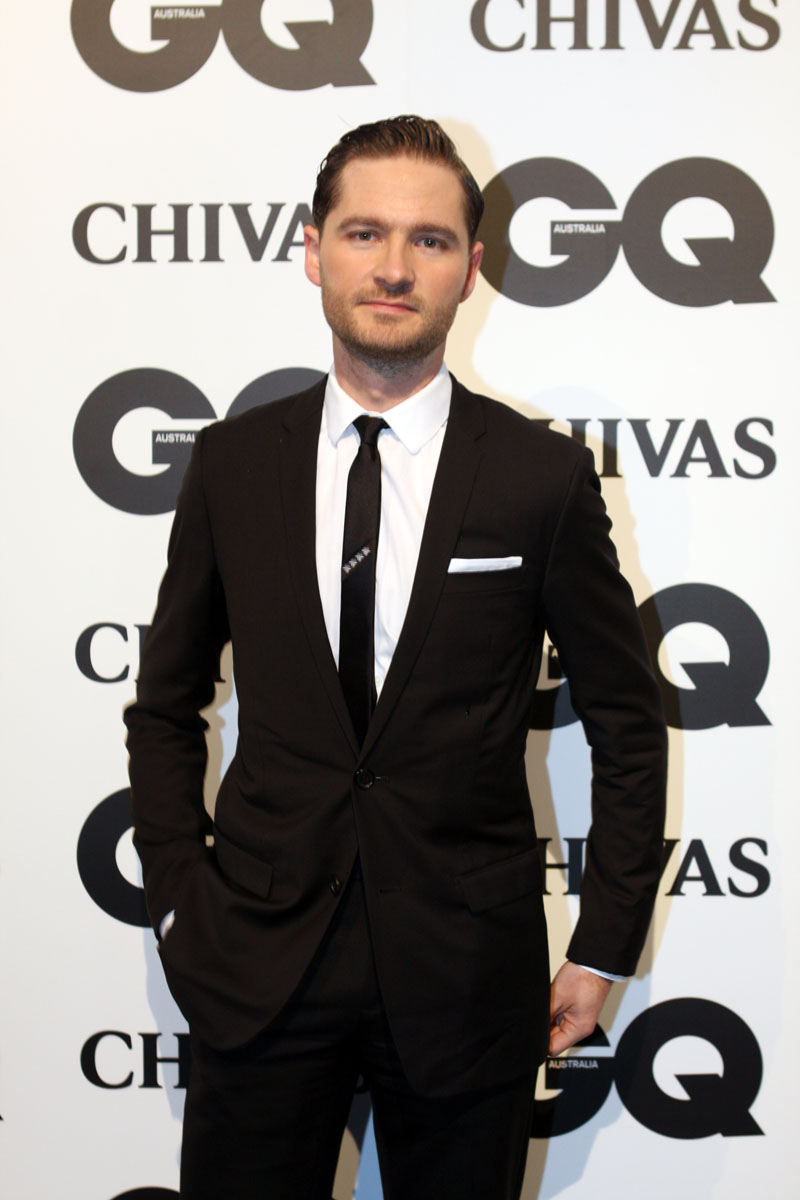
Charlie Pickering

- Roger Davies – artist manager, business manager, and music producer
- Rennie Ellis - photographer
- Bland Holt - comedian and theatrical producer
- Corbett Lyon AO – architect, co-founder of Lyons, art patron and academic
- Claude McKay – journalist, newspaper proprietor
- Sean O'Boyle AM – composer and conductor
- Charlie Pickering – comedian, television and radio presenter, author and producer
- Jim Vickers-Willis – journalist and square dance caller
- Masa Yamaguchi – actor, stunt performer and fight choreographer
- Allan Zavod OAM – pianist, composer, jazz musician and conductor

=== Business ===
- Andrew Bassat – co-founder of SEEK
- Paul Bassat – co-founder of SEEK
- Nick Farrow – Bitcoin engineer; creator of open-source Bitcoin payment processor SatSale, co-developer of FROST threshold cryptography for multisignature wallets, and co-founder of Frostsnap
- Marcus Bastiaan – businessman; former vice-president of the Victorian Division of the Liberal Party
- Sir Harold Winthrop Clapp KBE – railway administrator, Director-General of Australia's Land Transport Board (1942–1951)
- David Smorgon OAM – businessman and member of the Smorgon family
- Sam Walsh AO – businessman, philanthropist
- Doug Warbrick – co-founder of Rip Curl

=== Medicine, science and technology ===
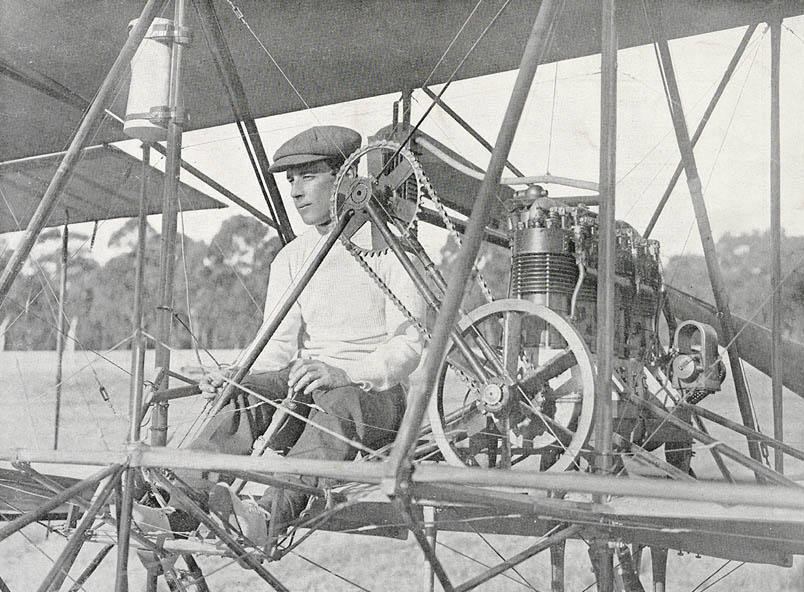
John Duigan

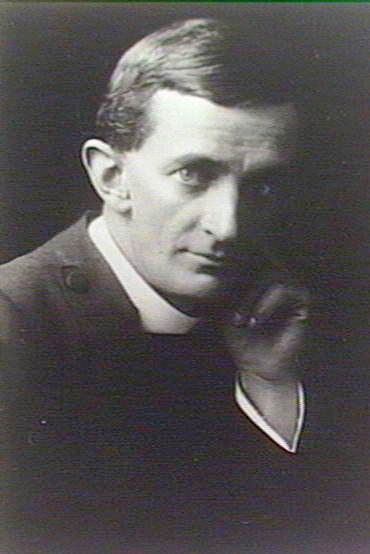
H. P. Finnis, c.19180

- Robin Batterham AO – chemical engineer; Chief Scientist of Australia (1999–2006)
- Lt. Col Sir Constantine Trent Champion de Crespigny DSO VD – soldier, medical practitioner, pathologist, academic and hospital administrator
- John Robertson Duigan MC – pioneer aviator who built and flew the first Australian-made aircraft
- Brad McKay – doctor, author and host of Embarrassing Bodies Down Under
- Samuel McLaren – mathematician, mathematical physicist, killed in action during the Battle of the Somme
- Ian Meredith AM – interventional cardiologist, Director of MonashHeart and Professor of Cardiology at Monash University

=== Military ===
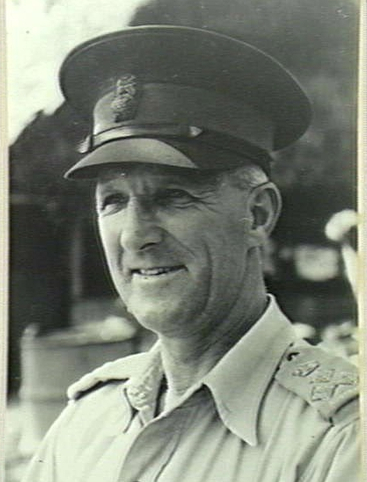
Brigadier Lewis Barker

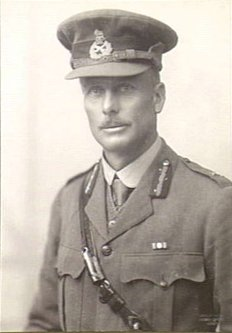
General William Grant

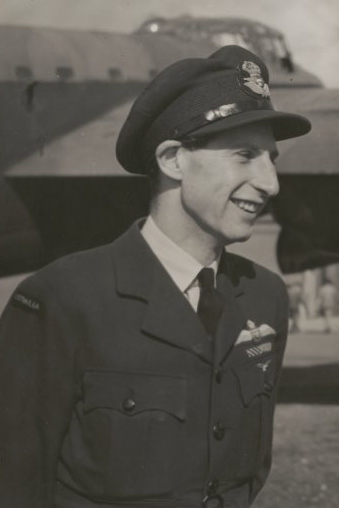
Peter Isaacson

- Brigadier Lewis Ernest Stephen Barker CBE, DSO, MC – Australian Army officer who fought in both world wars
- James Catanach – RAAF pilot and World War II PoW; took part in the 'Great Escape' in March 1944 but was re-captured and executed by the Gestapo
- Air Vice Marshal Hugh Vivian Champion de Crespigny, CB, MC, DFC – Royal Flying Corps pilot in World War I, and senior Royal Air Force officer during World War II
- William Grant CMG, DSO & Bar, VD – soldier and commander of the 4th Light Horse Brigade at the Battle of Beersheba
- Peter Isaacson AM, DFC, AFC, DFM – publisher and decorated military pilot
- Major-General Cyril Lloyd CB, CBE – senior British Army officer during the Second World War
- Brigadier John Lloyd CBE, DSO, MC & Bar – senior Australian Army officer who fought in the First and Second World Wars, farmer, and licensing magistrate
- Alexander Augustus Norman Dudley "Jerry" Pentland MC, DFC, AFC – aviator, World War I fighter ace

=== Politics and law ===
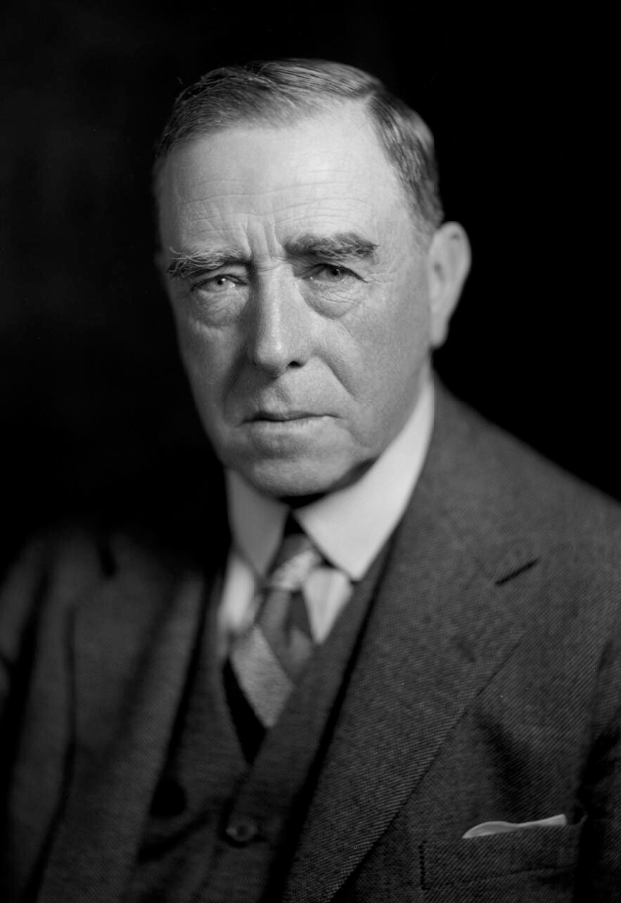
Sir Stanley Argyle

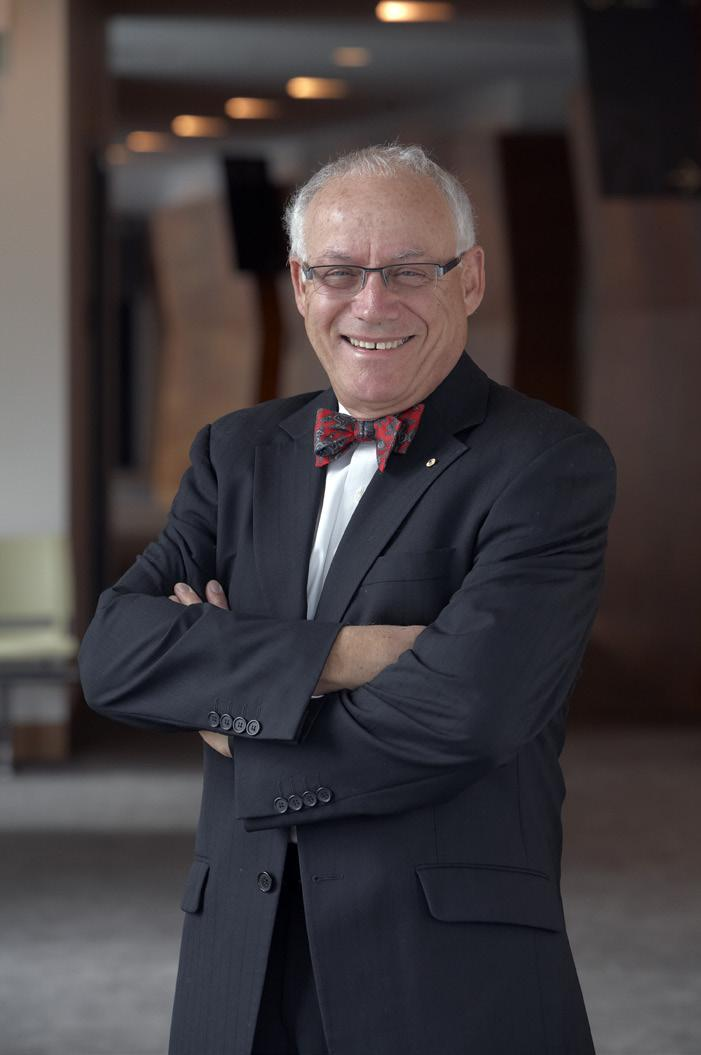
Michael Rozenes

- William Adamson – grain merchant, Brighton City councillor (1897–1913), Brighton City Mayor (1901–1902) and Member of the Victorian Legislative Council (1910–1922)
- Sir Stanley Argyle KBE, , – former Premier of Victoria; Member of the Victorian Legislative Assembly (Nationalist) for the seat of Toorak
- Mordy Bromberg – Federal Court judge, and VFL footballer with St Kilda
- John Gray - member of the Victorian Legislative Assembly (1904-1917) and longtime councillor
- Kim Hargrave – Justice of the Supreme Court of Victoria Court of Appeal
- Clifford Hayes – Mayor of Bayside (2008-2010); member of the Victorian Legislative Council (2018-2022)
- Neville Read Hudson DFC – RAAF pilot during World War II and Member of the Victorian Legislative Assembly (1976–1979)
- Roy Morgan – pollster, market researcher, and Melbourne City councillor (1959–1974)
- Roy Paton – farmer, President of Towong Shire Council (1929–1930, 1932–1933), Member of the Victorian Legislative Assembly (1932–1947)
- Sir Murray Victor Porter – Member of the Victorian Legislative Assembly
- Peter Reith – politician (Liberal); Minister in Howard Government (1996–2003); Member of the Australian House of Representatives for Flinders
- John Ross – Member of the Victorian Legislative Council (1996–2002)
- Michael Rozenes AO, QC – Chief judge of the County Court of Victoria (2002-2015)
- Herbert Valentine Tarte – Fiji-born planter, and Member of the Legislative Council of Fiji (1920-1922)
- Brigadier Raymond Walter Tovell CBE, DSO & Bar, ED – distinguished soldier, Member of the Victorian Legislative Assembly (1945-1955)

=== Religion ===
- Horace Percy Finnis – Anglican priest and organist
- Peter Thomson – Anglican priest notable for influencing Tony Blair while the two were classmates

=== Sport ===
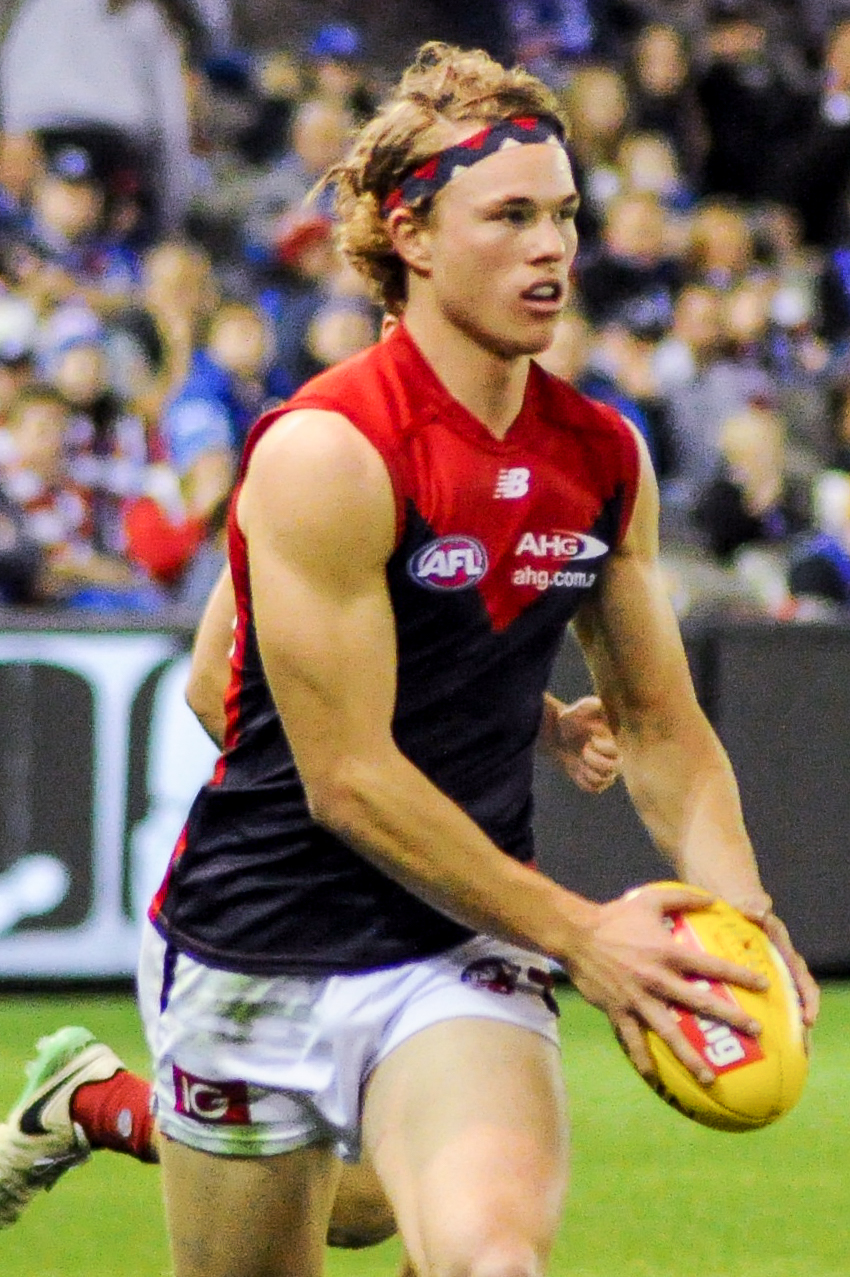
Jayden Hunt

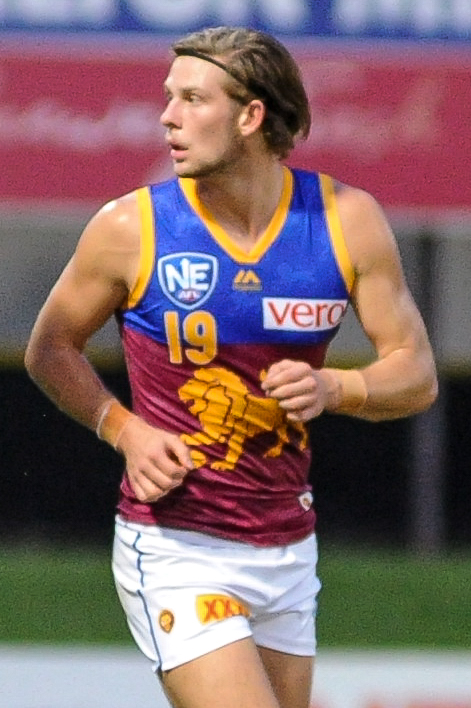
Josh Clayton

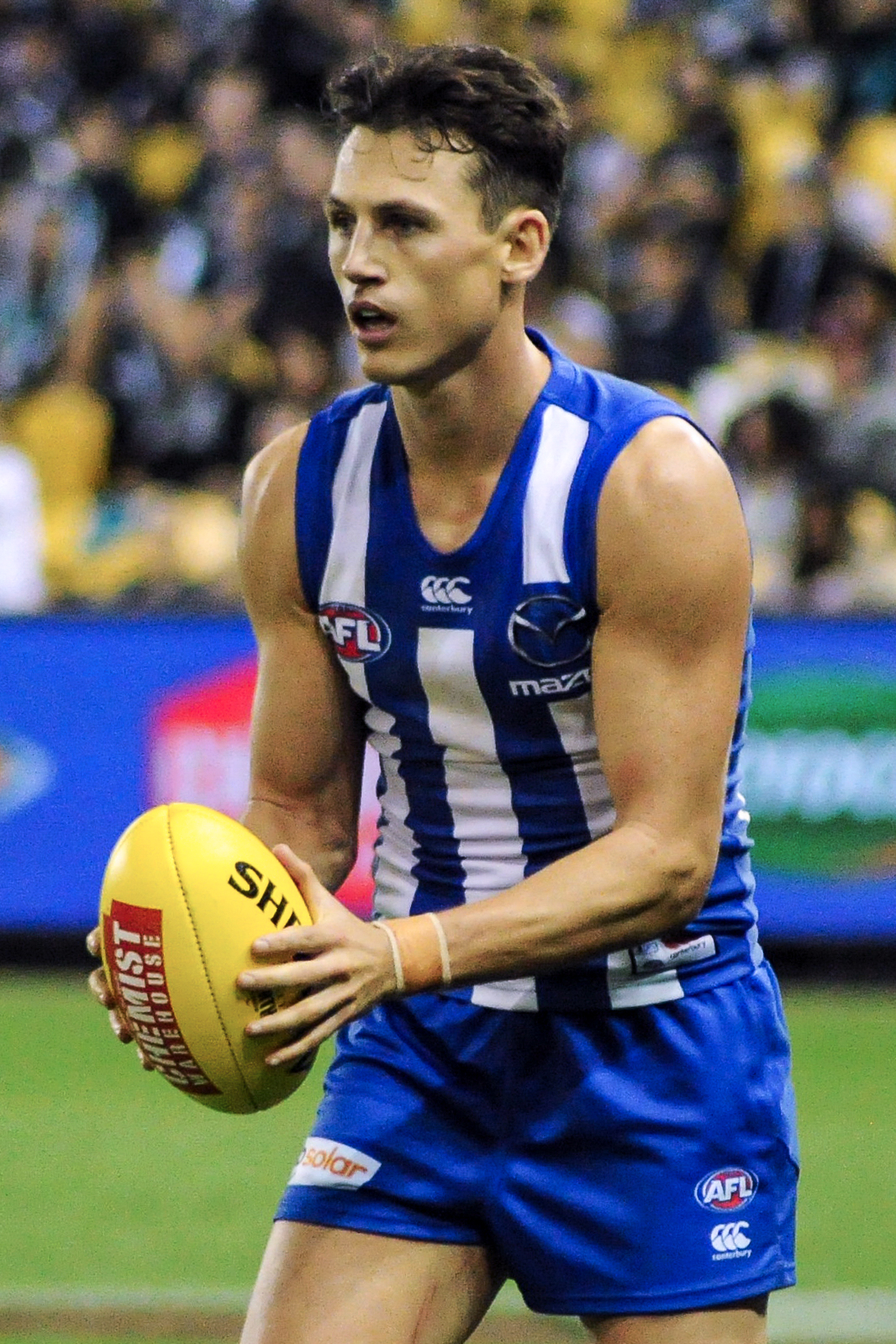
Ben Jacobs

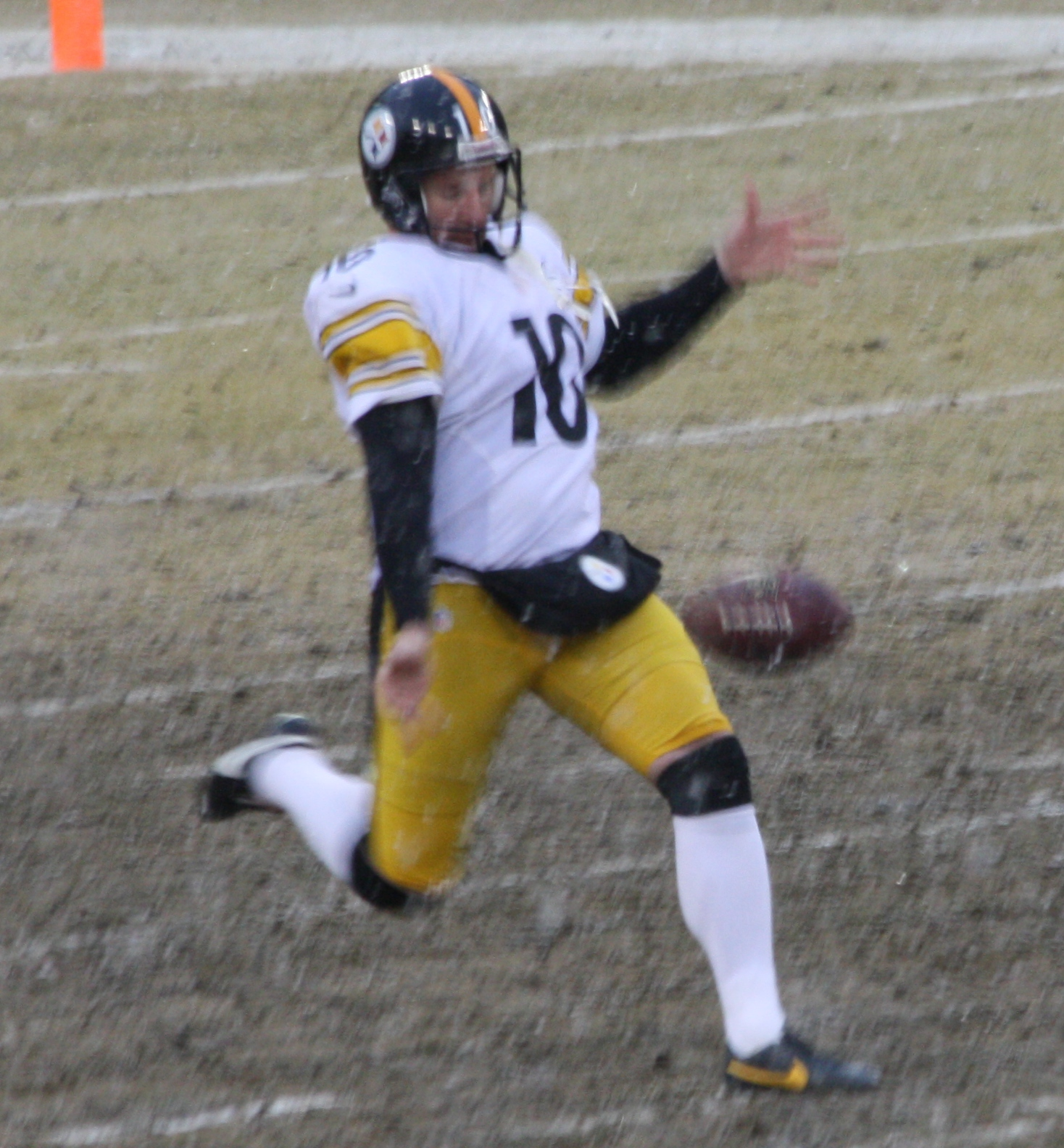
Mat McBriar

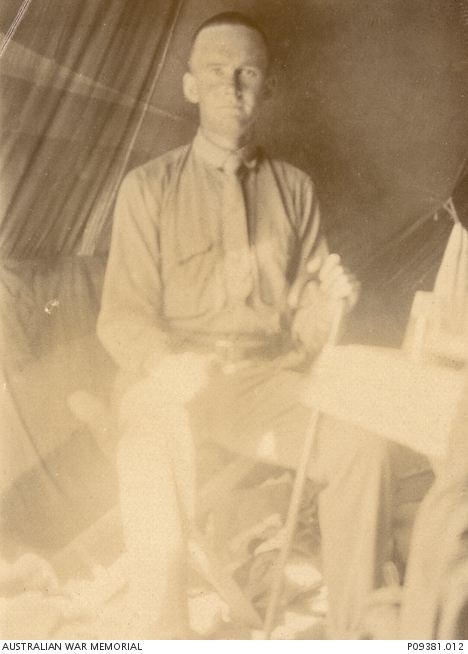
Lieutenant-Colonel James Nicholas

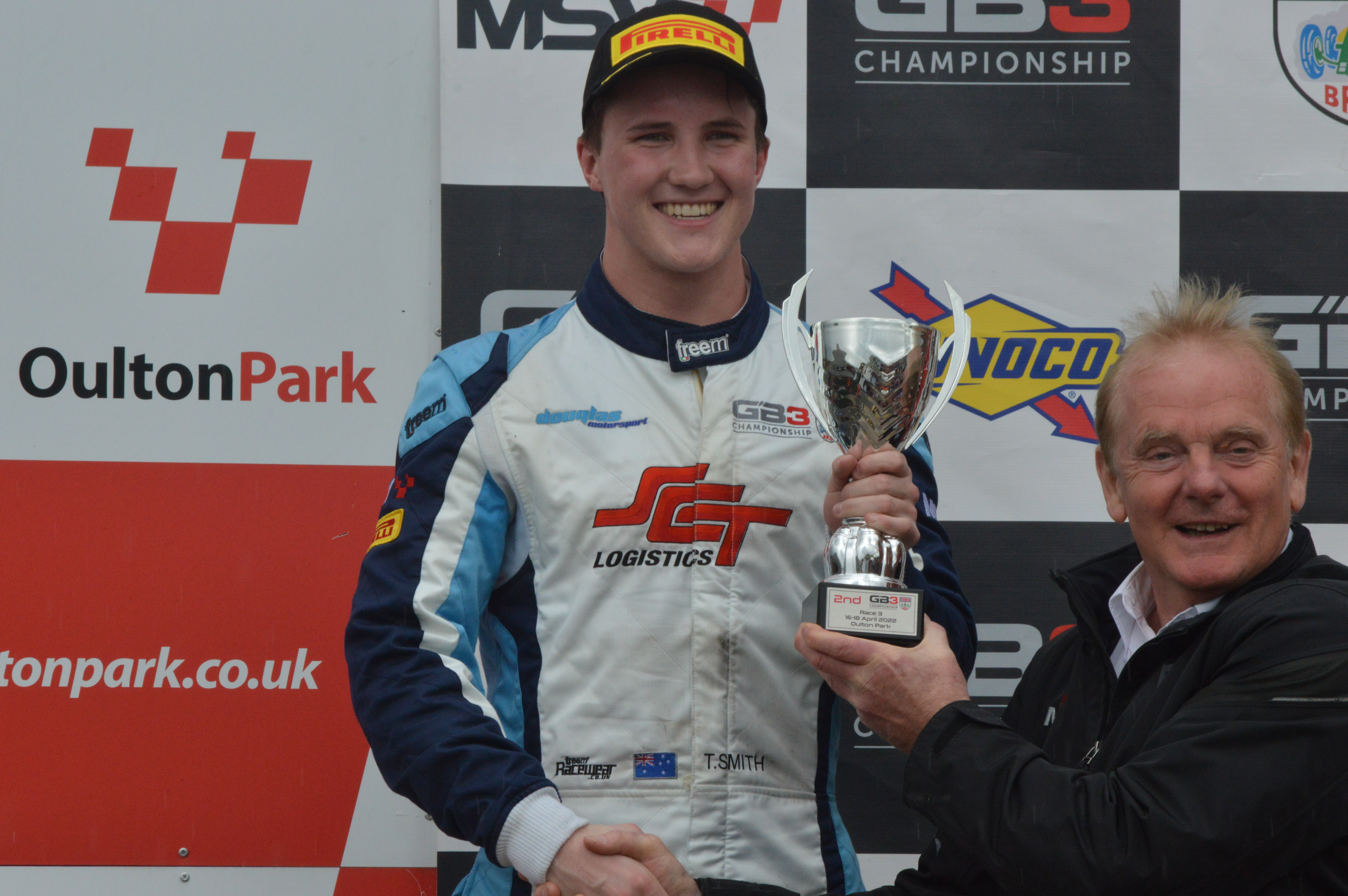
Tommy Smith

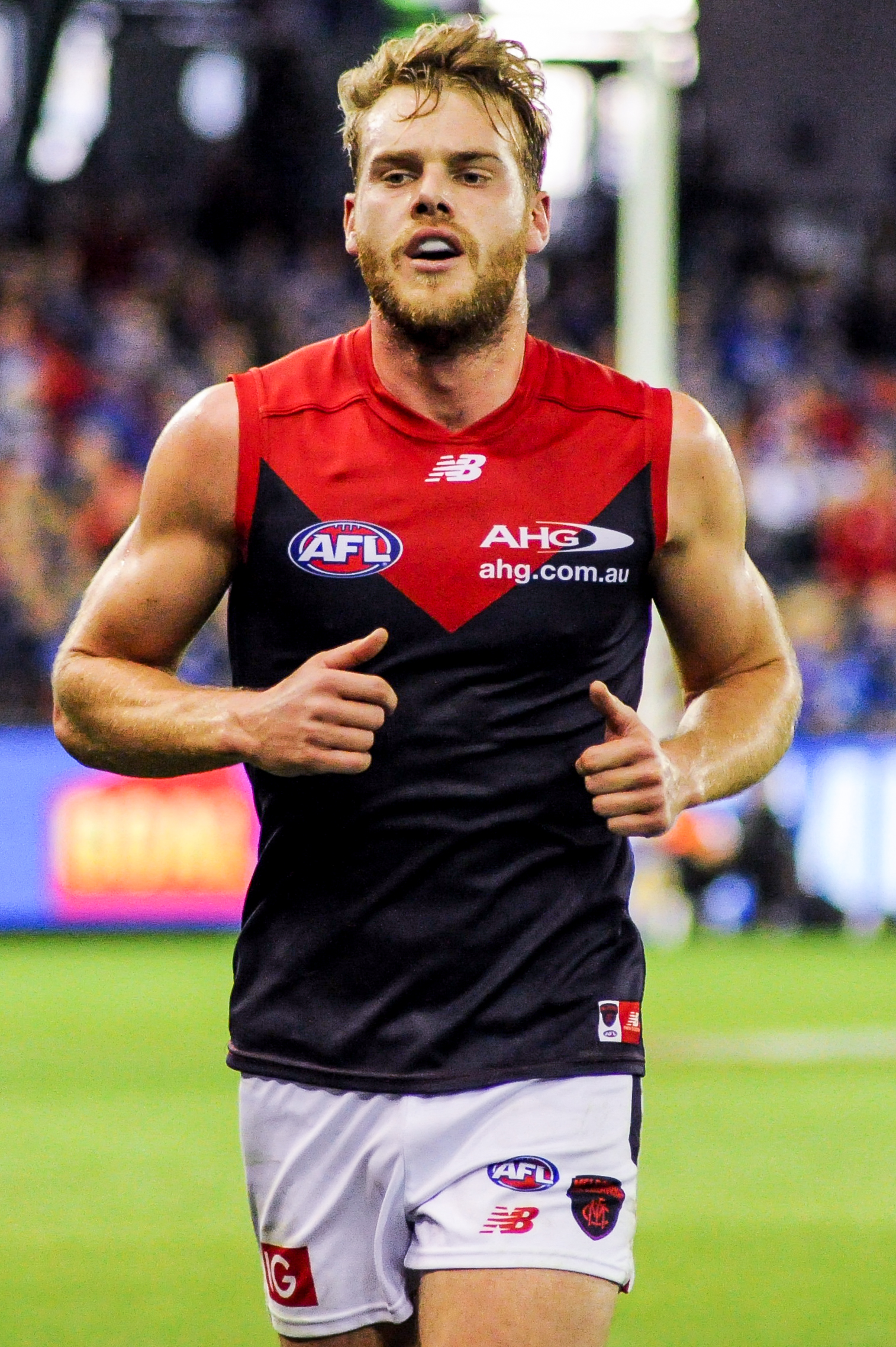
Jack Watts

- Levi Ashcroft - AFL footballer with Brisbane
- Will Ashcroft - AFL footballer with Brisbane, 2024 premiership player and Norm Smith Medal winner
- Dylan Alcott AO – wheelchair tennis player, Paralympian and radio host
- Gerry Balme – VFL footballer with St Kilda
- Travis Brooks OAM – Olympic field hockey player
- Louis Butler – AFL footballer with Western
- Ben Canham – Australian representative rower
- Bill Cannon – VFL footballer with St Kilda
- Warwick Capper – AFL footballer with Sydney and Brisbane
- Josh Clayton – AFL footballer with Brisbane
- Andrew Cooper – Olympic rower
- Chris Dawes – AFL footballer with Collingwood and Melbourne
- Jayden Hunt – AFL footballer with Melbourne and West Coast
- Matthew Jackson - AFL footballer with St Kilda
- Ben Jacobs – AFL footballer with Port Adelaide and North Melbourne
- Josh Kelly – AFL footballer with GWS
- Andrew Lauterstein – Olympic swimmer
- Matthew Lloyd – Olympic cyclist
- Cameron Mackenzie - AFL footballer with Hawthorn
- Craig Marais – international field hockey player
- Alex Mastromanno - American football player for Florida State
- Archer May - AFL footballer for Essendon
- Mat McBriar – American football player in the NFL
- William C. McClelland CBE – VFL footballer, Victorian Football League President (1926-1956) and medical doctor
- Andrew McGrath – AFL footballer with Essendon
- Andrew McLean - AFL footballer with St Kilda
- Gary Minihan – Olympic and Commonwealth sprinter, and Australian record holder for relay (since 1984)
- Nathan Murphy – AFL footballer with Collingwood
- Lieutenant-Colonel James Joachim Nicholas – VFL footballer with University; killed in action in World War I
- Bill O'Hara – VFL footballer with St Kilda and surgeon
- Archie Perkins – AFL footballer with Essendon
- Andrew Plympton – sports administrator and President of St Kilda FC (1993–2000)
- Harry Potter – rugby union player with Western Force
- Will Pucovski – cricketer
- Christian Salem – AFL footballer with Melbourne
- Jack Shelton – VFL footballer with St Kilda and South Melbourne; killed in action at Tobruk in 1941
- David Shepherd – cricketer with Victoria and VFL footballer with St Kilda
- Tommy Smith – international racing driver
- Ivan Stedman – Olympic swimmer
- Jock Sturrock MBE – yachtsman and Olympic sailor
- Albert Thurgood – VFA, WAFA and VFL footballer with Essendon and Fremantle
- Will Thursfield – AFL footballer with Richmond
- Luke Trainor - AFL footballer with Richmond
- Matthew Warnock – AFL footballer with Melbourne and Gold Coast
- Robert Warnock – AFL footballer with Fremantle and Carlton
- Jack Watts – AFL footballer with Melbourne and Port Adelaide; No. 1 Draft pick 2008
- Julien Wiener – Test cricketer for Victoria
- Harry Williams – golfer; Australian Amateur Champion in 1931 and 1937
- David Wittey – AFL footballer with St Kilda and Sydney

=== Misc ===
- James Ryan O'Neill (born Leigh Anthony Bridgart) – convicted murderer and suspected serial killer

== Members of staff ==
- Weston Bate OAM - historian; taught History at BGS
- Christian Jollie Smith – solicitor and co-founder of the Communist Party of Australia; taught English Literature at BGS (1919)
- William Hancock – Anglican priest and vicar at St Andrew's Church, Brighton (1918–1928); was instrumental in acquiring BGS for the Anglican Church in 1924, and was chairman of the school's Council (1925–1935)
- Ray Harper – VFL footballer with St Kilda, Carlton, and North Melbourne; taught at BGS
- Michael McCarthy – VFL footballer with Hawthorn and Brisbane; taught Physical Education and Health at BGS
- Simon McPhee - AFL football coach for St Kilda; football coach at BGS
- Simon Newcomb OAM - Olympic rower; Director of Rowing at BGS
- Robert Shaw - former AFL footballer for Essendon; football coach at BGS
- Major General Victor Stantke, CBE – senior officer in the Australian Army during the First and Second World Wars; taught at BGS
- Charles Henry Zercho – Anglican minister and VFA footballer with Essendon; resident master at BGS (1891–1892, and 1911–1913)
