= General Lloyd =

General Lloyd may refer to:

- Charles Lloyd (Australian general) (1899–1956), Australian Army major general
- Charles Lloyd (South Africa) (died 2014), South African Army lieutenant general
- Cyril Lloyd (British Army officer) (1906–1989), British Army major general
- Francis Lloyd (British Army officer) (1853–1926), British Army lieutenant general
- Herbert Lloyd (1883–1957), Australian Army major general
- James Lloyd (Maryland politician) (1745–1830), U.S. Army general
- Owen Edward Pennefather Lloyd (1854–1941), British Army major general
- Richard Eyre Lloyd (1906–1991), British Army major general
- Wilfrid Lewis Lloyd (1896–1944), British Army major general

== See also ==
- Gerald Lloyd-Verney (1900–1957), British Army major general
- Charles Loyd (1891–1973), British Army general
- Robert Loyd-Lindsay, 1st Baron Wantage, (1832–1901), British Army brigadier general
- Attorney General Lloyd (disambiguation)
