= Matt Rockman =

Investor and tech entrepreneur

- Born: 8 January 1968 (age 58); Melbourne, Victoria, Australia
- Education: Wesley College; Monash University
- Occupations: Entrepreneur, investor
- Website: mattrockman.com

Matthew Rockman is an Australian investor and tech entrepreneur, currently living In Australia. One of the three original founders of Seek Limited, alongside Paul and Andrew Bassat, Rockman took SEEK from a business plan to become one of Australia's most successful online businesses. SEEK is an ASX Top 100 Listed company with a market capitalisation of $5.5 Billion, and with businesses in the UK, China, Brazil, Australia, New Zealand and Malaysia.

== Early life and family ==
Matthew Rockman was born in Melbourne in January 1968. His father Irvin Peter Rockman CBE (6 April 1938 – 30 August 2010) was a well known Australian businessman, and the Lord Mayor of Melbourne. His mother Yvonne Rowe was a well known model and restaurateur. He has one brother, Ned Rockman. Rockman's grandfather had fled Poland due to anti-Jewish persecution, as had his mother's family, from Ukraine. They settled in Melbourne, where Norman Rockman established a chain of clothing stores, which operated under the family name. His grandfather sold Rockman's clothing chain to Woolworths in the 1960s and moved into hotels. Rockman attended Wesley College in Melbourne and graduated from Monash University with a degree in business (Banking & Finance). Also in 2014 Rockman was awarded an adjunct professorship by the Royal Melbourne Institute of Technology (RMIT) school of business. Rockman is married and has two children.

== Career ==
Rockman started his career in real estate at firms including CBRE Group before joining in the family business, Northrock Group. He worked in sales & marketing for seven years before founding Seek Communications with brothers Paul & Andrew Bassat in 1997.

=== SEEK ===
The idea for Seek came about when in March 1997, Paul Bassat, then a lawyer and trying to buy his first house, was frustrated with newspaper classifieds. He discussed with his brother Andrew, a management consultant, the idea of setting up an online real estate site and soon switched focus to online jobs. Rockman, a friend of the brothers came on board and the company launched in 1998. Rockman was in charge of Sales & Marketing at Seek. Irvin Rockman was a seed investor in Seek. In August 2003, Kerry Packer bought a 25% stake in Seek valuing the company at over $132m. Other shareholders at this time included Yahoo!, the Liberman and Besen families and several venture capital funds. Rockman exited from the seek.com in 2005 to pursue new professional challenges and spend more time with his young family. He said he would remain a long term shareholder in the company. Rockman's held 11 million shares in Seek worth over $40m when he announced his departure. James Packer said about Rockman "Matthew's persistence knocking on doors to kick-start Seek's fledging business in its earliest days is part of the company's history," Rockman joined software company Nitro PDF in 2007 as the company chairman. Although he invested in over 10 tech start-ups after Seek, this was his first hands-on role. Rockman is also a keynote speaker at ICMI and Saxton. Rockman currently works at Square Peg Capital, and is an investor in venture businesses.

== Philanthropy ==
Rockman and his wife have a foundation where they focus on community projects, which have the ability to enhance the social sector.
