= Brighton Grammar School =

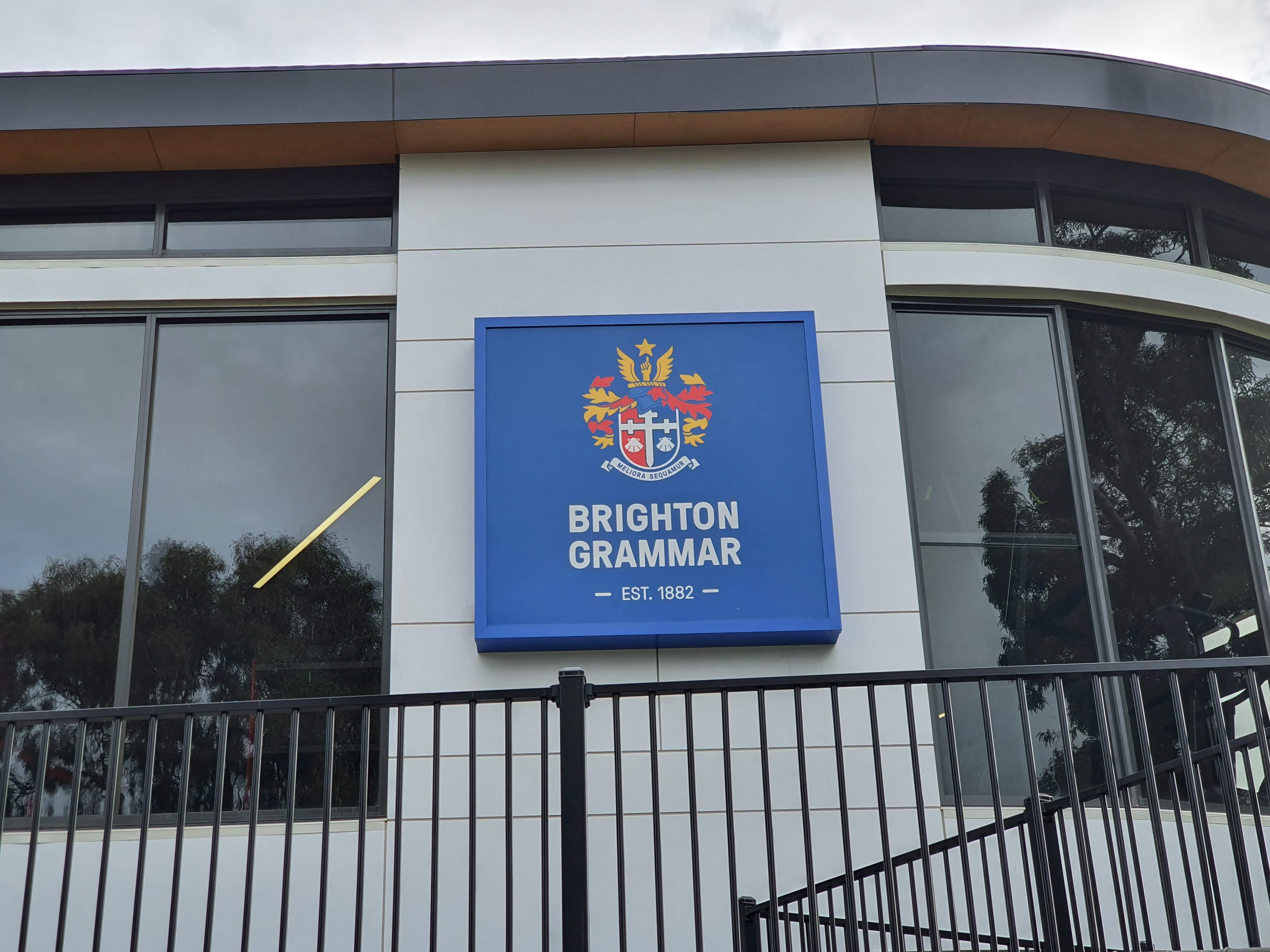
- Brighton Grammar School logo

Location
- 90 Outer Crescent; Brighton, Victoria 3186; Australia; 37°54′38″S 144°59′39″E

Information
- Type: private, single sex, day school
- Motto: Latin: Meliora Sequamur (Let us keep pursuing better things)
- Denomination: Anglican
- Established: 1882
- Founder: George Henry Crowther
- Sister school: Firbank Grammar School
- Headmaster: Ross P Featherston
- Employees: 250
- Gender: Boys
- Enrolment: 1,500 (K–12)
- Campus size: single campus, 3 hectares (7.4 acres)
- Colours: Red and blue
- Slogan: Be part of it
- Affiliation: Associated Public Schools of Victoria
- Alumni: Old Brighton Grammarians
- Website: www.brightongrammar.vic.edu.au

Brighton Grammar School is a private Anglican day school for boys, located in Brighton, a south-eastern suburb of Melbourne, Victoria, Australia.

Founded in 1882 by George Henry Crowther, Brighton Grammar has a non-selective enrolment policy and currently caters for over 1,500 students from the Early Learning Centre (ELC) to Year 12. The majority of students are drawn from the City of Bayside and surrounding suburbs of Brighton, East Brighton, Elsternwick, Hampton, Sandringham, Highett, Beaumaris and Black Rock.

The school is affiliated with a number of associations including the Junior School Heads Association of Australia (JSHAA), the Association of Heads of Independent Schools of Australia (AHISA), the Australian Anglican Schools Network, the International Boys' Schools Coalition IBSC, and the Associated Public Schools of Victoria (APS).

== History ==
Brighton Grammar School was founded on 14 February 1882, with eight male students. By 1890, 160 boys were in attendance. During the depression of the 1890s, students numbers declined rapidly.

Brighton Grammar School's first site was 165 New Street Brighton. It subsequently moved to Temperly Lodge, located on Outer Crescent, north of Allee Street, in which the school's Urwin Centre for Learning currently stands. The School's third site, Pendennis, on New Street, was opened in 1886 when the school boasted near 160 pupils. In 1905, the Headmaster and founder purchased Rosstrevor, a large estate south of Allee St and its surrounding swampland. This land is now known as the Crowther Oval, sitting at the centre of the school. The oval was constructed by the help of “Old Boy engineers” who called upon “4000 loads of filling” to produce the oval.

The school founder, George Henry Crowther was headmaster until his death in 1918. His son, Lieutenant Colonel Harry Arnold A. Crowther, subsequently assumed the role. Crowther retired in 1924, when Herbert E. Dixon took over.

Under Dixon, the school came near to bankruptcy, however was saved by incorporation under the auspices of the Church of England. In February 1927, the Governor-General Lord Stonehaven opened the present site of Brighton Grammar's Quadrangle. Dixon continued in expanding the school until his retirement in 1938.

Geoffrey G. Green was headmaster until sickness resulted in his resignation in 1942. His successor was Reverend Phillip St. John Wilson.

In 1958, Brighton Grammar joined the Associated Public Schools of Victoria (APS), and soon after purchased grounds on the former Brighton Gas Company site, where "Wilson House", now the Junior School, was to be built to accommodate the growing student numbers. This site was "among Victoria’s most toxic sites" after an EPA report found remnants of industrial toxins and chemicals in the soil in 2016. Under Wilson, the school's facilities grew, with the Tower Wing of the Quadrangle expanded, the first Annandale Pavilion constructed, and the Memorial Hall (where BGS’ library now stands) constructed.

With Wilson as Headmaster, enrolment continued to grow at a high rate. The number of boys reached 800 during the 1960s.

From 1967 to 1995, Robert Lancelot Rofe was headmaster. Rofe oversaw a large change in the school, with BGS’ facilities drastically expanded to accommodate an increasing number of students. Physical changes included the construction of the swimming pool at Wilson House, the Clive Crosby building (now the B-Hive) the Zachariah Wing, Baddiley Building at Wilson House and the Robert Sanderson Centenary Hall. In addition to these, the R. L. Rofe Creative Arts Centre accommodating music, woodwork, art and design was constructed and named in the Headmaster's honour.

Michael Spencer Urwin was appointed headmaster at the beginning of 1996. He had previously held the position of deputy headmaster at Brisbane Grammar School, and began his term by implementing a curriculum review, a pastoral care system, and a program of modernisation. This also included community education opportunities in out of school hours in order to make the school more inclusive and less parochial. A new senior school library and resource centre, and specialist classroom facilities were built to upgrade facilities in the senior school as well as the middle school later on.

Urwin saw the purchase of the Girrawheen site north of Allee Street (now the Urwin Centre for Learning), the construction of the Atrium and Senior Library, and the resurfacing of the H.V. Mitchell and Junior ovals to synthetic. In 2011, under Urwin still, the Peter Toms Early Learning Centre was established, whilst construction began on the new middle school. Enrolment grew significantly with 1262 boys on the roll at the time of his departure.

Ross P. Featherston was appointed Headmaster in 2014. Thus far, under the leadership of Featherston, the school has undergone redevelopment, with improvements to the G.B. Robertson Hall at Wilson House, renovation of the Crosby Building into the B-Hive, complete reconstruction of the Annandale Pavilion, internal renovations to the Argyle Building, the Tower and Hancock Wings and the Junior School, as well as ambitious projects such as the Urwin Centre for Learning (opened 2014) and the Duigan Centre for Science, Creativity and Entrepreneurship having opened in 2025.

In 2022, BGS celebrated its 140th anniversary. The program BGS2032 was created by the school to mark where BGS would be at its 150th anniversary. Student enrolments reached a high of 1500 in 2023 leading to the introduction of two new Houses.

In 2025, after three years of construction, the Centre for Science, Creativity and Entrepreneurship was officially completed and was named as The Duigan Centre, in honour of pioneering aviator and Brighton Grammar Old Boy, John Robertson Duigan (OB 1901). Over 750 people toured the centre during its opening weekend.

The centre was officially opened on Thursday 27 February by The Hon Nick Duigan, the grandnephew of John Duigan, with Bishop Kate Prowd performing the blessing.

The Duigan Centre aims to help students connect with the school's history and be inspired by the Old Boys who have gone before them.

== Affiliations ==
Brighton Grammar School has a close sister school relationship with Firbank Girls' Grammar School, an independent Anglican school for girls. Students of the two schools participate in a range of co-educational activities together. The school also maintains a close relationship with St Andrew's Anglican Church, Brighton.

In 2003, the Australian Government created the “Lighthouse Schools” program wherein 226 boys’ schools across Australia were selected as guiding institutions given data that boys were “significantly underperforming in key educational areas.” Brighton Grammar School received a $5,000 grant under the program to become a pivotal boys’ school.

== Crowther Centre for Learning and Innovation ==
The Crowther Centre for Learning and Innovation is an organisation run under the auspices of Brighton Grammar School to provide support services for the educational community. The Crowther Centre is part think-tank and research arm overseeing the collection and analysis of data to provide improved and informed decision-making processes. The Head of the Crowther Centre is Dr Ray Swann.

== House system ==
Brighton Grammar School currently has eight houses: Armstrong (white), Crowther (yellow), Dixon (blue), Fairweather (orange), Hancock (green), Melville (grey), Rofe (purple) and School (red). Hancock was added in 1986, and Rofe was added in 2005 The newest two houses were added in 2023 (Fairweather and reinstated Melville). In 1923 the original houses were Armstrong, Crowther, Dixon, Melville and School (for boarders).

- Armstrong House (1923): Characterised by an albatross, Armstrong is represented by the colour white. It honours Miss Eva Armstrong, a sister-in-law of Dr Crowther, who was for many years the Matron of the school. In her days the School was a boarding school and Miss Armstrong and Mrs Crowther took a great personal interest in the welfare of the boys and were often seen in the kitchen making jams and jellies and ensuring that the boys were well fed.
- Crowther House (1923): Represented by a cannon and the colour gold. The name honours Dr Crowther, founder and Headmaster from 1882 until 1918. His second son Henry attended BGS from 1896 to 1905 and was Dux in his final year. He was Second Master to his father from 1913 and enlisted at the outbreak of WWI. He was a distinguished soldier rising to the rank of Lieutenant-Colonel. He took over as Headmaster in 1919 after the death of Dr Crowther in December 1918.
- Dixon House (1923): Dixon is symbolised by a Duke and the colour light blue. Herbert E Dixon was the third Headmaster of the School. He first joined the staff in 1903, left in 1912, but returned when Dr Crowther died in 1918, serving as Acting Headmaster and then as Vice Principal until his appointment as Headmaster in 1924. In that year the School was taken over by the Brighton Grammar School Association. Under Mr Dixon's Headmastership, the Tower and Hancock Wings were built in 1927 and the Argyle Building, beside the Crowther Oval at Rosstrevor, was opened in 1932. He retired in 1938.
- Fairweather House (2024): Characterised by a fox and the colour orange. Mabel Fairweather was the longest-serving senior female BGS staff member and Head of the Junior School for 24 years (from 1939 to 1962). Under her stewardship, enrolments in the Junior School grew from 30 to 300 students. She was also a significant benefactor to BGS leaving a large portion of her estate to the School.
- Hancock House (1986): Hancock is represented by a cockerel and the colour green. Archdeacon Hancock was Vicar of St Andrew's, Brighton when the School was threatened with closure through lack of funds. Through his enthusiasm and untiring efforts, Brighton Grammar was bought from the Crowther family and the Brighton Grammar School Association was founded in 1924, thus establishing the School on its present foundation. Without Archdeacon Hancock, it is doubtful that the School would have survived
- Melville House (2024): Symbolised by a magician and the colour charcoal grey. Francis Balfour Melville was an exceptional BGS academic student from the class of 1908, who graduated from Cambridge and the University of Melbourne with First Class Honours. He served in WW1 and in 1921 returned to Brighton Grammar as Head of the Science Faculty; however, was tragically killed in a motor vehicle accident the following year. Melville was one of the original four Houses of 1923.
- Rofe House (2005): The House colour of purple represents Headmaster's Rofe trademark purple ink and has a raven as its symbol. The House honours Robert L Rofe AM, Headmaster from 1967 to 1995. Under his tireless leadership, School enrolments grew in number and stature. Many new buildings were constructed during his tenure including the Clive Crosby Building, the Centenary and Rosstrevor Halls, the Baddiley Building, the Creative Arts Building and the Gymnasium. The school became a competitive force in the APS, winning 18 APS premierships.
- School House (1929): Represented by a scorpion and the colour red. Until the closing of the boarding house at the end of 1954, School was the boarders' house. In 1955 boys from the other Houses were drafted into School House to ensure that the House remained active. Some of the senior boarders remained as BGS day boys and led the House during this period.

== Curriculum ==
Brighton Grammar offers its senior students the Victorian Certificate of Education (VCE).

Brighton Grammar School VCE results 2009–2025
Year	Rank	Median study score	Scores of 40+ (%)	Cohort size
2009	38	33	14.0	271
2010	41	33	14.5	283
2011	47	33	16.0	294
2012	61	33	17.1	262
2013	52	34	16.4	265
2014	56	34	15.3	234
2015	62	33	15.8	227
2016	45	34	22.3	217
2017	45	34	20.8	218
2018	46	34	18.3	218
2019	59	33	18.0	223
2020	21	35	25.1	211
2021	44	34	17.7	243
2022	31	35	19.9	259
2023	17	36	24.5	258
2024	24	35	24.3	286
2025	28	35	23.8	294

In 2025, two boys had achieved a full ATAR of 99.95.

== Extracurricular activities ==
=== Sport ===
Brighton Grammar is a member of the Associated Public Schools of Victoria (APS), and partakes in various sporting competitions against its other members. Students from year 7–12 participate in sports on Saturday with training during the week. These sports include rowing, sailing, basketball, AFL, rugby, touch rugby, diving, cricket, soccer, hockey and swimming.

==== APS Premierships ====
Brighton Grammar has won the following APS premierships:

- Badminton (1) – 2002
- Cricket (6) – 1977, 1980, 1983, 1984, 2000, 2005 and the Lord's Taverners Cup 2005
- Cross Country (2) – 1996, 1997
- Football (8) – 1975, 1992, 2014, 2015, 2016, 2022, 2024,2026
- Hockey (4) – 1976, 1980, 1983, 1998
- Rowing (3) – 1983, 2021, 2024
- Rugby (4) – 1969, 1981, 2024, 2026
- Sailing (5) – 2018, 2019, 2021, 2023, 2024
- Soccer (5) – 1999, 2003, 2004, 2013, 2025
- Tennis (7) – 1977, 1978, 1982, 2000, 2001, 2024, 2026
- Touch Football (1) - 2023
- Water Polo (1) - 1990

=== STEM ===
==== STEM Racing (previously F1 in Schools) ====
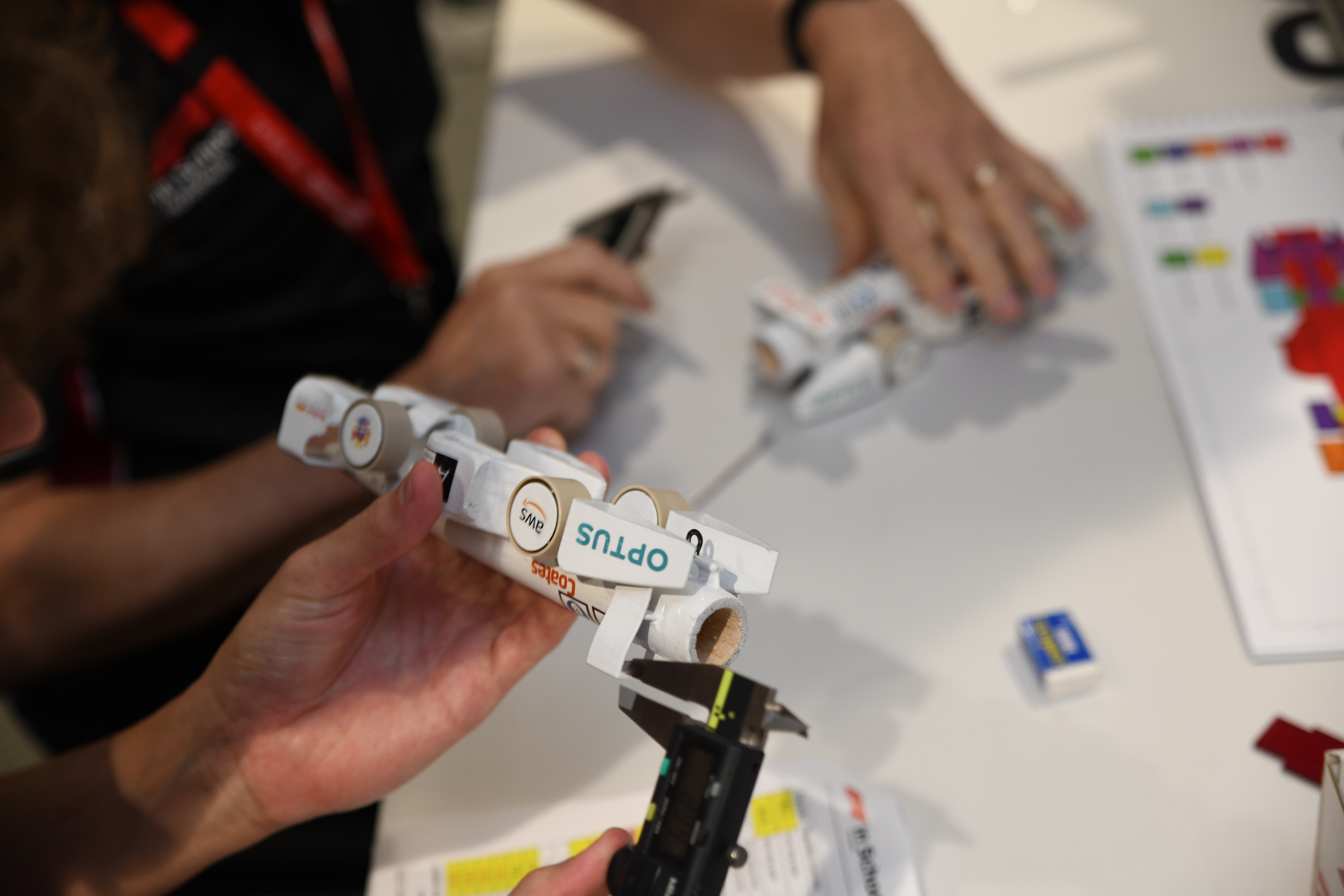
Constellation F1 in Schools Team cars being scrutineered at the 2021(22) Australian National Finals. The cars later went on to claim fastest lap.

Brighton Grammar participates in the STEM Racing challenge annually. They have advanced to the National Final for this competition ten times, with the following teams:

- 2017: Blue Tongue Racing (Development Class)
- 2020: Tasman 6 (the first F1 in Schools collaboration team between Australia and New Zealand) (Professional Class)
- 2020(21): Constellation Racing (Professional Class)
- 2022: Constellation (Professional Class)
- 2022: Livewire (Development Class)
- 2023: Phantom Racing (Professional Class)
- 2023: Lunar (Development Class)
- 2024: Lunar (Professional Class)
- 2025: Ad Astra (Professional Class)
- 2025: Lunar (Professional Class)

In 2022, Brighton Grammar School's F1 in Schools team, Constellation advanced to the 2023 Aramco F1 in Schools World Finals.

The team recorded a 17th-place finish at the school's first outing at the World Finals, with the 8th quickest car of 68 competitors. This presents a stable platform for BGS F1 to build upon.

In 2024, Brighton Grammar School's F1 in Schools team Lunar advanced to the 2024 Aramco F1 in Schools World Finals. Here they recorded a 3rd-place finish at the school's second World Finals outing, a record for BGS at the time.

In 2025, Brighton Grammar sent two professional class teams, Lunar and Ad Astra to the World Finals. This was the first occasion within Australia that one school sent two teams to the World Finals.

In 2025, Lunar won the Aramco STEM Racing World Finals, hosted in Singapore. Their victory marked the first STEM Racing World Championship for Brighton Grammar School, as well as the first time the school won Best Engineered Car at the competition. Lunar won a total of four awards from six nominations. Also represented at the competition was Ad Astra, who finished 15th against 83 competitors.

BGS has recorded the following results at the F1 in Schools/STEM Racing World Finals:

- 2023: Constellation - 17th from 58 teams
- 2024: Lunar - 3rd from 55 teams
- 2025: Ad Astra - 15th from 83 teams

*2025: Lunar - 1st from 83 teams

==== iDesign ====
Brighton Grammar School runs the iDesign program in Year 8, a competition where students are encouraged to design and pitch new products to the cohort. There are finalists and a winner chosen from the competitors, with the most recent being:

- 2025: Sam S - Simple Soy
- 2024: Xavier B- (Unknown)
- 2023: Monty B – Crowther for Men
- 2022: Nate W – Refurbished Cricket Bats
- 2021: Ben R – Solar Sun Tracker
- 2020: James T – Vision Impaired Rubik's Cube
- 2019: Jenson G – Digest'a Bowls
- 2018: Jordan S – Mindfulness Pod

=== Music ===
Brighton Grammar has a rich music program, with several orchestras, ensembles, and choirs, including:

For Strings:

- Secondary Strings Orchestra
- Corelli Symphony Orchestra (formerly known as Corelli String Orchestra till 2025)
- Cellobration (formerly known as Cello Choir till 2023)
- Many Smaller Ensembles like Year 8 Piano Quintet, Year 10 String Quintet, etc.

For Woodwinds, Brass and Percussion

- Senior Big Band
- Intermediate Big Band
- Senior Concert Band
- Meliora Concert Band (formerly known as Intermediate Concert Band till 2025)
- Flute Ensemble
- Percussion Ensemble

For Voice:

- Meliora Voices (Years 7–8)
- Senior Choir (Years 9–12)
- Ten Tonners

For Guitar:

- Guitar Ensemble
- Senior Guitar Orchestra

Other:

- Carols Symphony Orchestra (For Christmas)

(List not complete)

In 2023, Brighton Grammar alongside sister school Firbank Grammar hosted the "Spring Rhapsody" concert at the Melbourne Recital Centre, marking a return to large-scale concerts for the school following COVID-19. This occasion featured many combined ensembles from both BGS and FGS.

In 2026, Brighton Grammar announced that it collaborated with Firbank Grammar once again later in the year, planning to perform in the Melbourne Recital Centre towards the end of August.

In 2025, Brighton Grammar School was represented by two string quartets and a piano quintet at the Boroondara Eisteddfod, held at the Hawthorn Arts Centre in Hawthorn. The Year 9 piano quintet placed second in its section, the Year 7/8 string quartet (Competitive String Quartet) won its section, and the Year 8 quartet received an honorable mention.

In 2026 Brighton Grammar School re-entered the Boroondara Eisteddfod with the Year 8 Piano Quintet earning third place, and the Year 10 Piano Quintet claiming first place.

Not long after the second round of the Boroondara Eisteddfod, the Year 7 String Quartet, Year 8 Piano Quintet, Year 9 Piano Trio, Year 10 Piano Quintet and String Octet competed at the Ringwood Eisteddfod among a field of 29 ensembles, with the Year 8 Piano Quintet receiving an Honourable Mention.

In mid 2026, Brighton Grammar announced that one of its ensembles will be performing in the Strike the Chord hosted by Musical Viva Australia.

A year 7-10 (originally 7-9) string octet was formed in 2026 (announced in 2025), consisting of four violins, two violas, and four cellos.

== Historical Allegations and Cases ==
Brighton Grammar School has been referenced in historical allegations of student abuse, with reports spanning from 1965 to 2024. The school was included in an inquiry examining incidents across more than 180 Victorian schools.

Former staff member C. Smith was convicted in 2010 for offences committed between 2003 and 2008.

In separate cases, teachers J. Hewitt and G. Iliakis were charged during their employment in relation to the possession of inappropriate material.

== Notable alumni ==
Alumni of Brighton Grammar School are commonly referred to as Old Boys or Old Grammarians and may elect to join the schools' alumni association, the Old Brighton Grammarians' Society (OBGS). Some notable Old Brighton Grammarians include:

Architecture, engineering and technology

- John Leopold Denman – member of dynasty of architects
- John Robertson Duigan and Reginald Duigan – pioneer aviators who built and flew the first Australian-made aircraft
- Sir Lionel Hooke – pioneer in radio; wireless operator in Ernest Shackleton's Imperial Antarctic Expedition; engineer

Business

- Doug Warbrick – co-founder of Rip Curl
- Andrew and Paul Bassat – co-founders of SEEK

Entertainment, media and the arts

- Roger Davies – artist manager; business manager; and music producer
- Neil Douglas MBE – environmental artist; conservationist; author
- Rennie Ellis – social documentary photographer
- Leslie John Heil AM – radio broadcaster
- Peter Mattessi – screenwriter, executive producer, silver Logie winner, Australian Writers' Guild president
- Marcus Morelli – principal artist, Australian Ballet
- Charlie Pickering – comedian, television and radio presenter, author, producer, and host of The Weekly with Charlie Pickering

Medical

- Professor Ian Meredith AM – interventional cardiologist, director of MonashHeart, cardiology professor at Monash University
- Brad McKay – doctor, author and television personality
- Lieutenant Colonel James Joachim Nicholas – VFL footballer, killed in action in World War I

Military

- William Grant CMG DSO & Bar VD – soldier and commander of the 4th Light Horse Brigade at the Battle of Beersheba
- Lt. Col C. T. C. de Crespigny

Politics, public service and the law

- Sir Stanley Argyle KBE – former Premier of Victoria; Nationalist member for the seat of Toorak
- Barry Robert Dove – judge of the County Court of Victoria
- The Honourable Justice Kim Hargrave – justice of the Supreme Court of Victoria Court of Appeal
- Peter Reith AM – Australian politician; minister in the Howard government 1996–2003; Liberal member for the seat of Flinders
- Michael Rozenes QC – chief judge of the County Court of Victoria
- Raymond Walter Tovell – Member of the Victorian Legislative Assembly (Liberal) for Brighton

Religion

- John Charles McIntyre – former Anglican Bishop of the Diocese of Gippsland, Victoria; recipient of the Centenary Medal 2003 (also attended Fort Street High School)

Sport

- Dylan Alcott – Paralympian, 2022 Australian of the Year
- Will Ashcroft – AFL player
- Levi Ashcroft - AFL player
- Travis Brooks – Olympic hockey player
- Louis Butler – AFL footballer
- Ben Canham – Australian representative rower
- Josh Canham – rugby union player
- Warwick Capper – AFL footballer
- Josh Clayton – AFL footballer
- Andrew Cooper – Olympic rower
- Chris Dawes – AFL footballer
- Josh Dolan – AFL footballer
- Jayden Hunt – AFL footballer
- Ben Jacobs – AFL footballer
- Josh Kelly – AFL footballer
- Andrew Lauterstein – Olympic swimmer
- Matthew Lloyd – Olympic cyclist
- Cameron Mackenzie – AFL player
- Archer May – AFL player
- Mat McBriar – American football player
- William C. McClelland – doctor, VFL footballer and Victorian Football League President
- Andrew McGrath – AFL footballer
- Gary Minihan – Olympian, Commonwealth medal winner, Australian record holder (since 1984)
- Nathan Murphy – AFL footballer
- Archie Perkins – AFL player
- Harry Potter – rugby union player
- Will Pucovski – cricketer
- Christian Salem – AFL footballer
- Tommy Smith – international racing driver
- Albert Thurgood – VFL footballer
- Will Thursfield – AFL footballer
- Luke Trainor – AFL footballer
- Matthew Warnock – AFL footballer
- Robert Warnock – AFL footballer
- Jack Watts – AFL footballer
- David Wittey – AFL footballer

== See also ==
- List of schools in Victoria
