= Louis Butler =

Louis Butler may refer to:

- Louis B. Butler (born 1952), justice of the Wisconsin Supreme Court
- Louis Butler (footballer) (born 2001), Australian rules footballer
