= Bdjobs =

Employment website in Bangladesh

Bdjobs.com Ltd.
- Type: Private
- Industry: Employment
- Founded: July 2000; 26 years ago
- Founder: Fahim Mashroor
- Headquarters: Dhaka, Bangladesh
- Total equity: Seek Limited (35%) Fahim Mashroor (33%)
- Website: bdjobs.com

Bdjobs is job searching website and professional networking service from Bangladesh. It began in 2000. They frequently host job fairs and events.

In May 2018, Seek International owned 35% and Fahim Mashroor owned 33% of the company.

In 2026, 6 million Bangladeshi job seekers CV was leaked from Bdjobs. The CV's were being sold on dark web after the leak.
