= Attorney General Lloyd =

Attorney General Lloyd may refer to:

- David Lloyd (judge) (1656–1731), Attorney General of Pennsylvania
- William F. Lloyd (1864–1937), Attorney General of Newfoundland

== See also ==
- General Lloyd (disambiguation)
