= David Shepherd (sportsman) =

Australian sportsman

Personal information
- Full name: David Stanmore Shepherd
- Born: 3 August 1956 (age 70); Melbourne, Victoria
- Original team: Brighton Grammar
- Height: 173 cm (5 ft 8 in)
- Weight: 70 kg (154 lb)

Playing career^{1}
Years	Club	Games (Goals)
1976–1977	St Kilda	4 (1)
- ^{1} Playing statistics correct to the end of 1977.

David Stanmore Shepherd (born 3 August 1956) is an Australian sportsman who played Victorian Football League football with St Kilda and cricket for Victoria.

Shepherd was recruited to St Kilda from Brighton Grammar and played four senior games with the club, two in 1976 and another two in 1977. The only goal of his career was kicked in a game against South Melbourne.

In the 1982–83 Australian cricket season he made his debut for Victoria in a one day match against the touring Sri Lankan cricket team. His 43 not out from the middle order guided his side a six wicket victory. Two weeks later he made his Sheffield Shield debut, managing scores of 17 and 2 in a loss to South Australia, his only first-class match.

== See also ==
- List of Victoria first-class cricketers
