= Matt Comyn =

Australian businessman

- Born: 1975 (age 50–51); Paddington, New South Wales, Australia
- Education: Sydney Boys High School
- Alma mater: Harvard Business School; University of Sydney; University of New South Wales
- Organizations: Morgan Stanley Australia (2010); Commonwealth Bank (1999–2010; 2010–present)
- Title: Chief Executive Officer of the Commonwealth Bank
- Term: April 2018–present
- Predecessor: Ian Narev
- Children: 3

Matt Comyn is an Australian business executive and the current chief executive officer (CEO) of Australia's Commonwealth Bank, one known to be a part of the "Big Four Banks". Having been with the bank since 1999 (aged 24), Comyn became the CEO in April 2018, taking over from Ian Narev. In 2010, Comyn briefly joined Morgan Stanley's Australian brokerage business; however, he came back to the Commonwealth Bank and worked under Ian Narev.

== Early and personal life ==
Comyn was born in the Eastern Sydney Suburb of Paddington in 1975. He was educated at the Sydney Boys High School before attending the University of New South Wales, studying Bachelor of Aviation. He also received a Master of Commerce, Finance from the University of New South Wales, and also studied at Harvard Business School, and later, received a Master of Business Administration degree from the University of Sydney.

== Personal life ==
Comyn is married to Lucy Comyn and they have three children: two daughters and one son. The Commonwealth Bank said that Comyn was separated from Lucy "for some time".
