= Lewis Barker (Australian Army officer) =

Australian Army officer

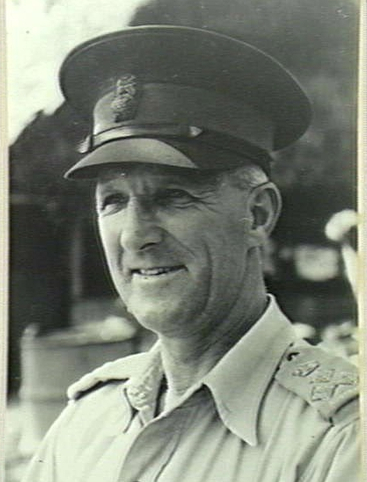
- Brigadier Lewis Barker c. 1943
- Born: 5 May 1895; Mulgrave, Victoria
- Died: 13 December 1981 (aged 86); Corryong, Victoria
- Military career
- Allegiance: Australia
- Branch: Australian Army
- Service years: 1914–1949
- Rank: Brigadier
- Service number: VX 12777
- Commands: 4th Military District (1946–49); Royal Artillery, I Corps (1942–43); 2/1st Field Regiment (1940–41); 2/4th Field Regiment (1940)
- Conflicts: First World War; Second World War
- Awards: Commander of the Order of the British Empire; Distinguished Service Order; Military Cross; Mentioned in Despatches (2)

Brigadier Lewis Ernest Stephen Barker, CBE, DSO, MC (5 May 1895 – 13 December 1981) was a career Australian Army officer, who saw distinguished service in both of the world wars.

== Military career ==
Lewis Barker was born on 5 May 1895 in Mulgrave, Victoria, to parents Richard Barker and Edith Sibella Frances. He attended the Brighton Grammar School and the Royal Military College, Duntroon. After graduating from the latter, he became a lieutenant on 4 April 1916, by which time the First World War was well underway. He served in the 8th Field Artillery Brigade and later the 39th Battalion on the Western Front from 1916 to 1918, when he was transferred to the 12th Field Artillery Brigade and promoted to captain. For valiant actions in late September 1918, during the Hundred Days Offensive, he received the Military Cross, the citation for which reads:

While acting as Liaison Officer with infantry on the 28th September, 1918, west of Bellicourt, with one other as bayonet man, he bombed his way along a trench under heavy machine-gun fire, reestablished an important flanking post, and reconnoitred across a difficult enemy pocket on the flank, getting valuable information. He has always shown continued conspicuous gallantry, ability, and devotion to duty.

In 1921, he married Alice Hope McEachern. He served in the army, and after various promotions took command of fortresses at Newcastle, New South Wales.

In 1940, Barker took command of the 2/4th Field Regiment, and soon traveled to the Middle East, assuming command of the 2/1st Field Regiment. For his work, he was awarded the Distinguished Service Order.

Barker returned to Australia, and was made director of artillery. In 1942, he took command of I Corps' artillery. Barker soon assumed command of the artillery of the 7th Division, New Guinea Force and I Corps. He was then in charge of the artillery of the First Army, and was appointed a Commander of the Order of the British Empire in December 1943. Barker next took command of the 4th Military District, retiring from the army on 12 March 1949.

Barker died at the age of 86 on 13 December 1981.
