= Bill O'Hara (footballer, born 1879) =

Australian rules footballer

Personal information
- Full name: William Ernest O'Hara
- Born: 9 January 1879; St Kilda, Victoria
- Died: 3 May 1941 (aged 62); Shanghai, China
- Original team: Collegians Football Club

Playing career^{1}
| Years | Club | Games (Goals) |
| 1900 | St Kilda | 13 (3) |
- ^{1} Playing statistics correct to the end of 1900.

William Ernest O'Hara (9 January 1879 – 3 May 1941) was an Australian rules footballer who played with St Kilda in the Victorian Football League (VFL).

== Family ==
The son of eminent surgeon Henry Michael O'Hara (1853–1921), and his first wife, Ernestine Ellen O'Hara (1857–1883), née Klingender, William Ernest O'Hara was born in St Kilda on 9 January 1879.

== Education ==
Educated at Brighton Grammar School, and at the University of Melbourne, he moved to Edinburgh in 1901 to continue his medical studies and, on 15 December 1905 "William Ernest O'Hara, L.R.S.C.E." was admitted as a Fellow of the Royal College of Surgeons of Edinburgh.

== Football ==
=== St Kilda (VFL) ===
Recruited from Collegians Football Club in the Metropolitan Junior Football Association (MJFA) in 1900, he played his first match for St Kilda, against Melbourne, at the Junction Oval on 5 May 1900. He played well all season and, in all, played 13 games and scored 3 goals.

Although he would otherwise have continued to play, he was not available to St Kilda in the next season (1901), due to his move to Edinburgh to continue his medical studies.

=== Ulverstone (NWFA) ===
He joined the Ulverstone Football Club in Tasmania's North Western Football Association (NWFA).

In 1907 he was part of a representative North West Coast team that was thrashed 23.19 (157) to 3.4 (22) by the Melbourne Football Club on its 1907 Tasmanian tour, at Latrobe, on 6 June 1907.

== Medicine ==
Having worked in various U.K. hospitals for a time after his qualification to gain additional experience, he returned to Australia in 1906, and moved to Ulverstone, Tasmania where he practised with Sir John McCall. In addition to his registration in Victoria, on his move to Ulverstone he was also registered in Tasmania:

THE GAZETTE
The "Gazette" of the 5th inst. contains the following notifications:—
Court of Medical Examiners. — William Ernest O'Hara, L.R.C.P. Edin., 1903, L.R.C.S. Edin. 1903, L.F.P.S. Glasg. 1903, F.R.C.S. Edin. 1905, has been registered as a legally-qualified medical practitioner in Tasmania. (Address, Ulverstone.) — The Mercury, 6 June 1906.

He left his practice Ulverstone in June 1907, and moved to Leonora in the West Australian goldfields. In 1911, he left Leonora, and returned to Melbourne in order to take charge of his father's Collins Street practice. In 1912, he was appointed honorary clinical assistant to the out-patient surgeon at The Alfred Hospital.

After World War I, he conducted a medical practice in Shanghai for more than twenty years.

== Military service ==
He enlisted in the First AIF on 4 August 1915, and served overseas in the Australian Army Medical Corps.

== Death ==
He died in Shanghai, China on 3 May 1941.
