= Frederick William Zercho =

Australian school administrator and college teacher

Frederick William Zercho (16 August 1867 – 15 April 1953) was an Australian school administrator, technical/TAFE college head and technical/TAFE college teacher. The brother of Charles Henry Zercho, he was born in Barkers Creek (near Castlemaine), Victoria and died in Kew, Melbourne, Victoria.
