= Ian Meredith =

Australian Cardiologist (born 1956)

Professor Ian T Meredith AM
- Born: Melbourne
- Education: Brighton Grammar School, Monash University, Harvard University
- Medical career
- Profession: Cardiologist, Professor
- Field: Clinical and Interventional Cardiology
- Institutions: MonashHeart, Monash Health, Monash University
- Sub-specialties: Cardiology
- Research: Clinical and Interventional Cardiology
- Awards: Member of the Order of Australia

Professor Ian Meredith (born 8 November 1956) is an Australian Cardiologist best known for his studies in the field of Interventional Cardiology and Clinical Cardiology. He is currently the Global Chief Medical Officer and Executive Vice President at Boston Scientific. He was previously a Professor of Cardiology for Monash University, the Director of MonashHeart and Monash Health in Melbourne, Australia, and an Executive Director of the Monash Cardiovascular Research Centre, Monash Health. In 2012 he was appointed a Member of the Order of Australia for his work as a clinician and a researcher in cardiology as well as his contributions as an advocate and advisor to the public health organisations.

== Early years and education ==
Born in Melbourne, Meredith is the second of four children. After attending Brighton Grammar School from 1968 to 1974, Meredith went on to pursue his degree at Monash University. Meredith graduated with distinction from the Alfred Hospital Clinical School winning both the Harriet Power and Robert Power scholarships for Medicine and Surgery in his final year. Meredith then went on to specialist training in his chosen field of cardiology. After completing his PhD at the Baker Medical Research Institute in 1991, Meredith spent three years gaining experience and further training in the United States at the Brigham and Women’s Hospital and Harvard Medical School in Boston, Massachusetts, where he trained in Interventional Cardiology.

== Career ==
In 2005 he became director of MonashHeart, a new entity that unified the departments of cardiology at Monash Medical Centre and Clayton and Dandenong hospitals. Professor Meredith has over 20 years experience as a clinical and interventional cardiologist. He has performed more than 10,000 invasive cardiac and coronary procedures and has been chief investigator or principal investigator for over 30 major international multicentre, randomised trials. His clinical experience includes percutaneous coronary interventions, rotablation, intravascular ultrasound imaging and also structural heart disease which includes PFO and ASD closures and percutaneous aortic valve implantation (TAVI).

== Contributions to Cardiology ==
Ian Meredith has led the MonashHeart team to national and international clinical firsts and he has been the worldwide principal investigator in large international trials. He has published more than 200 papers in peer-reviewed journals and has given more than 300 invited lectures and presentations internationally.

== Awards and recognition ==
- 1988 – Ralph Reader Young Investigators Award
- 1989 – Bayer Australia ACC Travelling Scholarship
- 1990 – Ralph Reader Overseas Research Fellowship
- 1993 – Trainee Investigator Award by American Federation for Clinical Research
- 2007 – Finalist in Individual Category Profile, City of Melbourne
- 2012 – Member of the Order of Australia (AM), General Division
