= Charles Henry Zercho =

Anglican minister and school principal

Charles Henry Zercho (15 April 1866 – 30 March 1962) was an Australian Anglican minister, school principal, and Australian rules footballer.

== Family ==
The son of Charles Henry Zercho (1866-1895), and Agnes Zercho (1841-1937), née Nicol, Charles Henry Zercho was born at Barkers Creek (near Castlemaine), Victoria, Australia on 15 April 1866.

He married Margaret Emma Clark (1876-1940) on 17 April 1900. They had five children: two daughters and three sons — a son (born 1910) was stillborn, and a daughter (born 1903), and a son (born 1905) each died within 6 months of their birth.

His brother, Frederick William Zercho (1867-1953), founded Zercho's Business College in 1906.

== Education ==
He graduated Bachelor of Arts from the University of Melbourne on 13 April 1918.

== Football ==
Recruited from Camberwell, he played with the Essendon Football Club, in the Victorian Football Association (VFA) in 1890; and, in the third quarter of his first senior match, against Geelong, at the East Melbourne Cricket Ground on 28 June 1890, he kicked Essendon's fourth and final goal for the match.

== Cleric and educator ==
Over his lifetime he held numerous positions as a teacher, headmaster, priest, and as the minister of various parishes.

== Death ==
He died in Murwillumbah, New South Wales, Australia on 30 March 1962.
