= Bill Cannon (footballer) =

Australian rules footballer

Personal information
- Full name: Bill Cannon
- Born: 4 April 1956 (age 70)
- Original team: Brighton Grammar
- Height: 189 cm (6 ft 2 in)
- Weight: 83 kg (183 lb)
- Position: Forward

Playing career^{1}
Years	Club	Games (Goals)
1975	St Kilda	1 (0)
- ^{1} Playing statistics correct to the end of 1975.

Bill Cannon (born 4 April 1956 in Australia) is a former Australian rules footballer who played with St Kilda in the Victorian Football League (VFL). Two sons both played for Old Brighton in the Victoria Amateur Football Association.
