= Cyril Lloyd (British Army officer) =

Major-General Cyril Lloyd CB CBE
- Lloyd in 1946
- Born: 14 April 1906
- Died: 27 July 1989 (aged 83); Horsham, West Sussex, England
- Military career
- Allegiance: United Kingdom
- Branch: British Army
- Service years: 1929–1947
- Rank: Major-General
- Service number: 44586
- Unit: Royal Artillery
- Conflicts: Second World War
- Awards: Companion of the Order of the Bath; Commander of the Order of the British Empire

Major-General Cyril Lloyd, CB, CBE (14 April 1906 – 27 July 1989) was a senior British Army officer who served during the Second World War.

== Military career ==
Educated at Brighton Grammar School and the University of Cambridge, Lloyd was commissioned into the Royal Artillery on 25 December 1929. Posted to 57th Field Regiment Royal Artillery, he was promoted to lieutenant on 25 December 1932 and to captain on 8 March 1935. He then attended the Territorial Army officers course at Staff College, Camberley in 1939.

Lloyd saw action as a staff officer with the temporary rank of major serving with 12th (Eastern) Infantry Division as part of the British Expeditionary Force in France at the start of the Second World War. He was mentioned in dispatches and evacuated out from Cherbourg in June 1940.

Lloyd became Deputy Assistant Adjutant General to the General Staff of the Canadian Forces in July 1940 in which role he was appointed an Officer of the Order of the British Empire in the 1943 New Year Honours. He became Assistant Director of Military Survey at the War Office in October 1943 and, after being promoted to temporary lieutenant-colonel on 27 January 1944, he became Deputy Chief of Staff for 21st Army Group in April 1944. In this role he took part in the Normandy landings for which he was advanced to Commander of the Order of the British Empire.

Lloyd went on to be Director of Army Education in December 1944, in which role he was promoted to full colonel on 11 April 1945 and to major-general on 2 July 1946. After leaving the army he was appointed a Companion of the Order of the Bath in the 1948 New Year Honours.

Lloyd went on to become Director-General of the City and Guilds of London Institute in 1949 and Chairman of the Associated Examining Board in 1970 before retiring in 1976.

Lloyd was a Liveryman of the Worshipful Company of Goldsmiths and received the Freedom of the City of London on 27 June 1949.

Lloyd died on 27 July 1989: both he and his wife were cremated and both were interred at St. Mary's Church, Horsham.

== Family ==
Lloyd married Winifred Dorothy Moore; they had one daughter. He later married Marjorie Blanche Fripp (1916-2008), daughter of Isaac and Blanche Fripp.

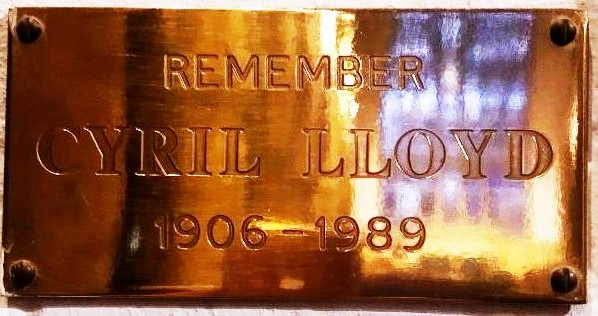
Plaque in honour of Major General Cyril Lloyd, at St. Mary's Church, Horsham

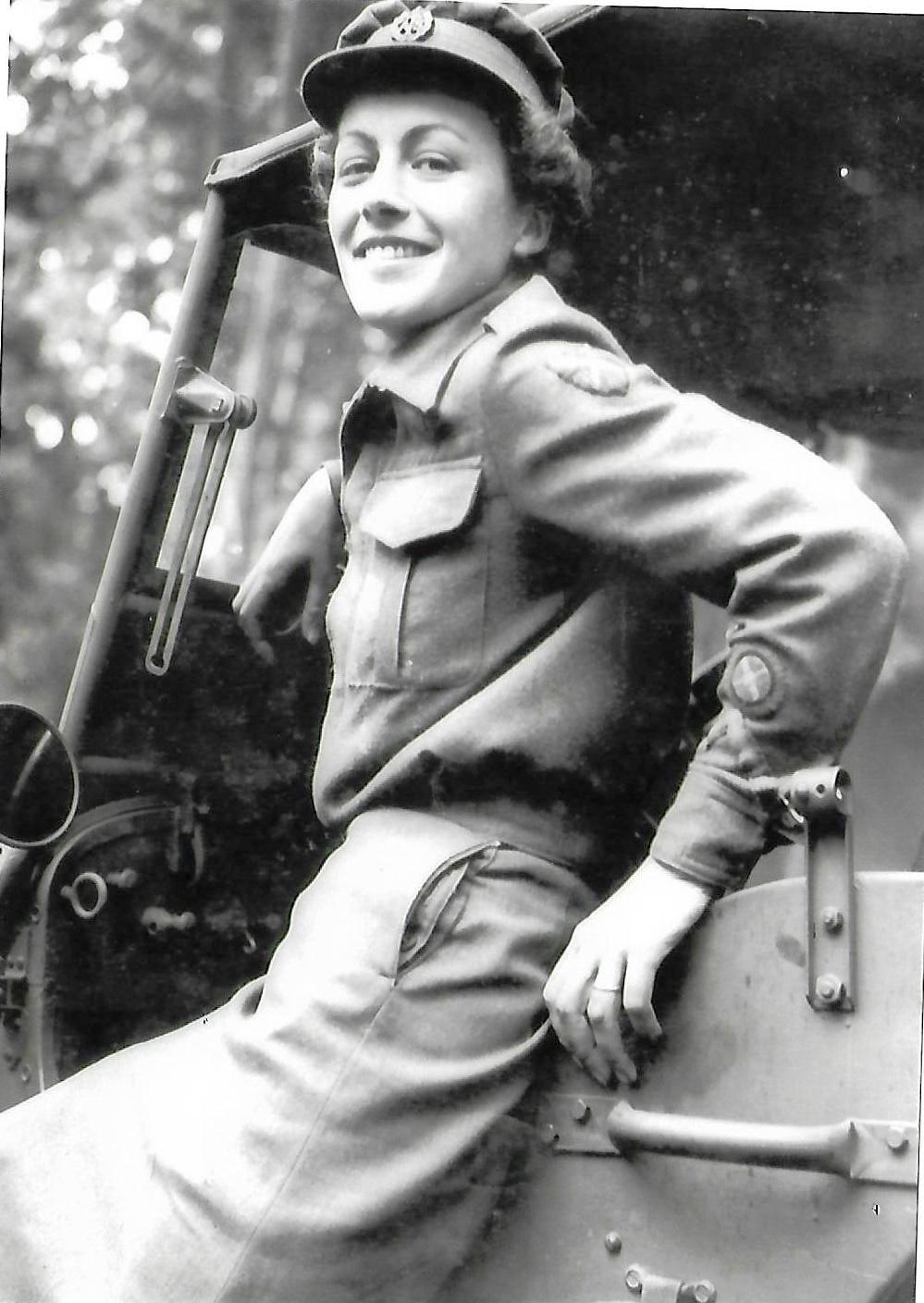
Lloyd's wife, Marjorie Fripp (1916-2008), his ATS driver in Normandy during the Second World War.

Cine film of Cyril Lloyd in Horsham, Sussex 1958 and Shorncliffe, Kent 1962 VP8

== Works ==
- Lloyd, Cyril, Major-General (1948). "Education in the British Army". Nature. 158 (4022). Army Information Digest: 26. PMID 20276875.
