= Andrew Bassat =

Australian businessman

Andrew Reuven Bassat is an Australian businessman. He is best known for co-founding Australian recruitment website Seek Limited in 1997.

Bassat became president of the St Kilda Football Club in December 2018.

== Biography ==
Bassat's father was an IBM executive from Egypt and his mother was born in Poland. Bassat attended Brighton Grammar School, and then completed a Bachelor of Science (Computer Science) at the University of Melbourne, Bachelor of Laws (Honours) from Monash University, and a Master of Business Administration from Melbourne Business School.

He co-founded recruitment website Seek in 1997, following his brother Paul Bassat's negative experience searching for a home.

Bassat was awarded the Australian EY Entrepreneur of the Year Award in 2013.

Bassat remained CEO of Seek until 2021, being succeeded by Ian Narev. He still is CEO subsidiary Seek Investments.
