= Ray Harper (footballer) =

Australian rules footballer

Personal information
- Full name: Raymond Albert Harper
- Born: 26 July 1900; Byaduk, Victoria
- Died: 10 March 1935 (aged 34); Melbourne, Victoria
- Original team: Brighton Grammar

Playing career^{1}
| Years | Club | Games (Goals) |
| 1919–1923 | St Kilda | 35 (0) |
| 1924 | Carlton | 2 (0) |
| 1925 | North Melbourne | 2 (0) |
| Total | | 39 (0) |
- ^{1} Playing statistics correct to the end of 1925.

Raymond Albert Harper (26 July 1900 – 10 March 1935) was an Australian rules footballer who played with St Kilda, Carlton, and North Melbourne in the Victorian Football League (VFL).

Harper played for five years at St Kilda, including every match of the 1923 season. He was awarded the "most attentive to training" award for the 1922 season.

He was cleared to Carlton for the 1924 VFL season, as he was working as a teacher in nearby Parkville.

In 1925 he was part of North Melbourne's inaugural league season.
