= Jim Nicholas =

Australian rules footballer

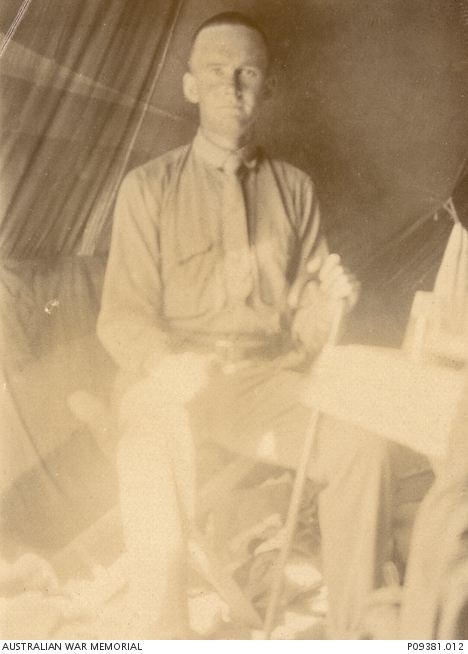
- Nicholas in 1915

Personal information
- Full name: James Joachim Nicholas
- Born: 17 November 1890; Picola, Victoria
- Died: 20 September 1917 (aged 26); Menin Road Ridge, Passchendaele salient, Belgium
- Position: Half back

Playing career^{1}
Years	Club	Games (Goals)
1911	University	1 (0)
- ^{1} Playing statistics correct to the end of 1911.

James Joachim Nicholas (17 November 1890 – 20 September 1917) was an Australian rules footballer who played with University in the Victorian Football League. He was killed in action, in Belgium, during World War I.

== Family ==
The son of William John Nicholas, and Sarah Nicholas, née Joachim, James Joachim Nicholas was born at Picola, Victoria on 17 November 1890.

== Education ==
He was educated at Brighton Grammar School. In 1906, aged 15, he passed the matriculation examination.

He studied medicine at the University of Melbourne, graduating as Bachelor of Medicine and Bachelor of Surgery (M.B.B.S.) in 1911, and as Doctor of Medicine (M.D.) in 1913.

== Medicine ==
Following his graduation, and before his military service, he practised medicine jointly with Dr. Richard Horace Gibbs in Colac, Victoria.

== Football ==
A regular player for the university's Metropolitan Amateur Football Association (MAFA) team, he played one VFL match for the university team, as a last minute inclusion in a team badly depleted in numbers, in the round 12 match, against Richmond Football Club, at the Melbourne Cricket Ground, on 8 July 1911.

== Military service ==
He served in the Australian Medical Corps during the First World War but was killed in action at the Menin Road Ridge, aged 26, on 20 September 1917, while serving at the Passchendaele front.

== See also ==
- List of Victorian Football League players who died on active service

== Sources ==
- Holmesby, Russell & Main, Jim (2007). The Encyclopedia of AFL Footballers. 7th ed. Melbourne: Bas Publishing.
- Australian War Memorial Roll of Honour: James Joachim Nicholas.
- World War One Service Record: Lieutenant Colonel James Joachim Nicholas, National Archives of Australia.
- World War One Nominal Roll: Lieutenant Colonel James Joachim Nicholas, Australian War Memorial.
- World War One Embarkation Roll: Captain James Joachim Nicholas, Australian War Memorial.
