= Ian Narev =

New Zealand banker (born 1967)

- Born: 22 April 1967 (age 59); Auckland, New Zealand
- Education: University of Auckland; New York University; Cambridge University
- Title: CEO, Seek Limited

Ian Narev (born 22 April 1967) is the CEO of SEEK Limited. He is a former managing director and chief executive officer of the Commonwealth Bank Group commencing these roles on 1 December 2011 and being succeeded by Matt Comyn.

Narev was educated at Auckland Grammar School in New Zealand and holds an undergraduate degree from the University of Auckland as well as graduate degrees from Cambridge University and New York University.

From 1998 until 2007, Ian worked at McKinsey & Company, in the New York, Sydney and Auckland offices. He left to join the Commonwealth Bank. On April 1, 2019, Narev was announced as the COO and CEO of the Asia-Pacific and Americas division of the Australian-based job-board SEEK.

== Personal life ==
Ian Narev was born in Auckland to a Jewish family. As a child, he starred in a New Zealand television series Children of Fire Mountain.

He lives in Australia with his wife Frances and their three daughters, Emilia, Zoe and Alexandra.

== Commonwealth Bank scandals ==
On 7 March 2016 Narev formally apologised to customers following a 2014 exposé by ABC TV Four Corners and Fairfax journalists into serious irregularities concerning the refusal of claims of dying and seriously ill clients by the insurance arm of the Commonwealth Bank. On 14 August 2017, Narev announced he would step down as Commonwealth Bank CEO within a year amid allegations the bank breached anti-money laundering laws on almost 54,000 occasions.

Business positions
Preceded by Ralph Norris	chief executive officer of the Commonwealth Bank of Australia; 2011 – 2018	Succeeded by Matt Comyn
