= Archie May =

Australian rules footballer (born 2004)

Archer May

Personal information
- Full name: Archer May
- Born: 27 August 2004 (age 22)
- Original team: Sandringham Dragons (Talent League)/Subiaco (WAFL)/Richmond (VFL)
- Draft: No. 6, 2025 mid-season rookie draft
- Debut: Round 14, 2025, Essendon vs. Geelong, at Melbourne Cricket Ground
- Height: 198 cm (6 ft 6 in)
- Weight: 96 kg (212 lb)

Club information
- Current club: Essendon
- Number: 26

Playing career^{1}
Years	Club	Games (Goals)
2025–	Essendon	17 (21)
- ^{1} Playing statistics correct to the end of round 22, 2026.

Archer May (born 27 August 2004) is a professional Australian rules footballer with the Essendon Football Club in the Australian Football League (AFL).

== Junior career ==
As a teenager, May played his junior football for St Kilda City JFC. May attended high school at Brighton Grammar, where he played for Old Brighton Grammarians in the Victorian Amateur Football Association (VAFA), due to the association between the club and the school. May also played for the Sandringham Dragons in the Talent League, kicking 29 goals from 13 games. However, May was not drafted in his initial draft-eligible year.

Having gone undrafted, May spent two seasons playing for Richmond's reserves team in the Victorian Football League (VFL) before moving to Western Australia in 2025 to play for Subiaco in the West Australian Football League (WAFL). May was selected to play for the WAFL in a state game against the SANFL, and shortly afterwards was widely seen as a likely mid-season draft prospect for AFL clubs.

== AFL career ==
May was drafted to Essendon with pick 6 in the 2025 mid-season rookie draft. In the lead up to the draft, it had been reported that Collingwood had told May, a Collingwood supporter growing up, that they would draft him and he should nominate for an 18-month contract in order to help avoid other club's selecting him before their pick, so Essendon's surprise selection came as a shock.

May played one VFL game for Essendon, before being called up to make his AFL debut in Round 14 against Geelong at the Melbourne Cricket Ground, three weeks after being drafted. May had 7 disposals and took 3 marks on debut. May finished the season having played 7 senior games for the Bombers.

== Personal life ==
May is the step-son of Australian Football Hall of Fame member and Hawthorn legend Dermott Brereton, with May crediting Brereton for playing a big role in helping him to reach the top level.

== Statistics ==
Updated to the end of round 22, 2026.

Legend
G	Goals	K	Kicks	D	Disposals	T	Tackles
B	Behinds	H	Handballs	M	Marks	H/O	Hit-outs

Season	Team	No.	Games	Totals								Averages (per game)								Votes
Season	Team	No.	Games	G	B	K	H	D	M	T	H/O	G	B	K	H	D	M	T	H/O	Votes
2025	Essendon	26	7	7	3	43	19	62	23	19	5	1.0	0.4	6.1	2.7	8.9	3.3	2.7	0.7	0
2026	Essendon	26	10	14	5	45	13	58	32	26	4	1.4	0.5	4.5	1.3	5.8	3.2	2.6	0.4	0
Career			17	21	8	88	32	120	55	45	9	1.2	0.5	5.2	1.9	7.1	3.2	2.6	0.5	0
