= Josh Clayton =

Australian rules footballer (born 1996)

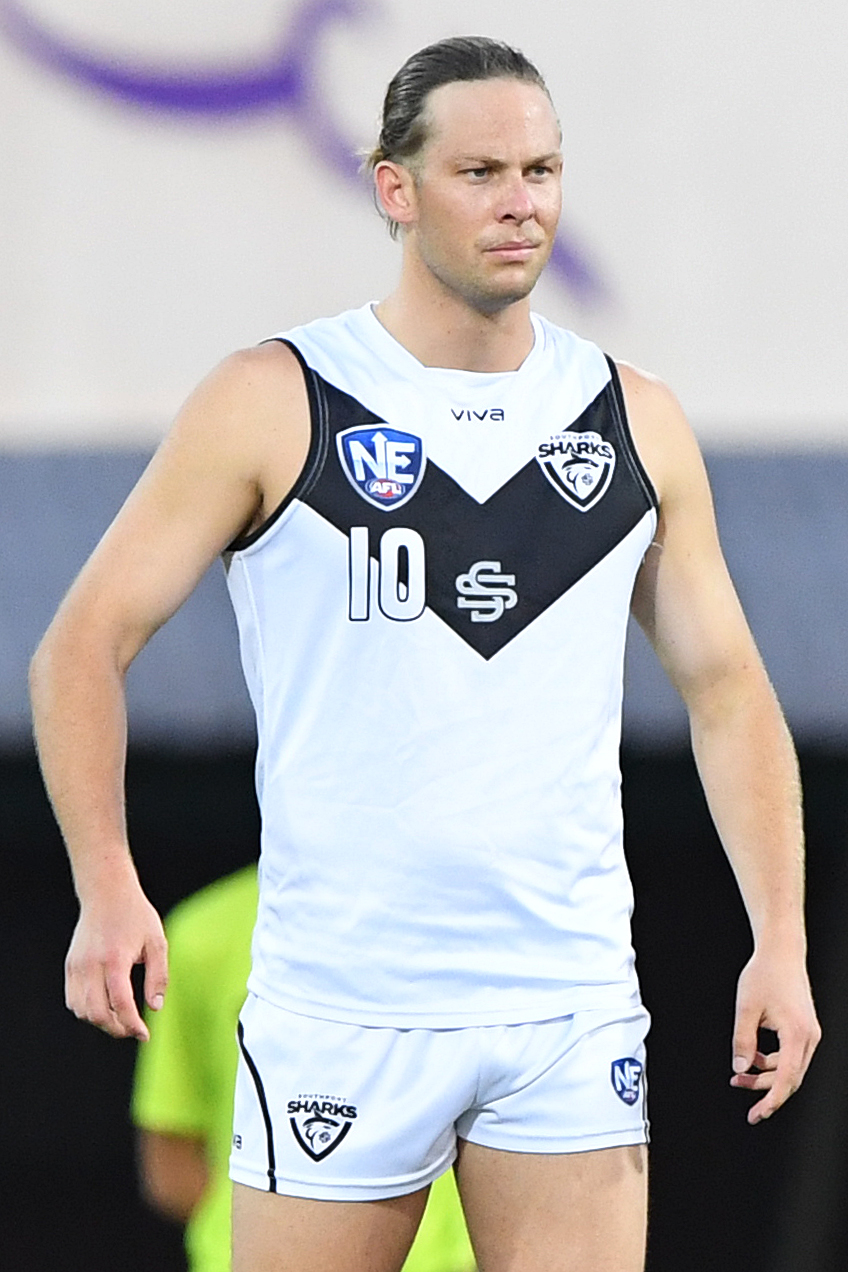
- Clayton in August 2018

Personal information
- Full name: Josh Clayton
- Born: 17 January 1996 (age 30)
- Original team: Sandringham Dragons (TAC Cup)
- Draft: No. 86 (F/S), 2014 national draft
- Debut: Round 22, 2016, Brisbane Lions vs. Geelong, at the Gabba
- Height: 191 cm (6 ft 3 in)
- Weight: 86 kg (190 lb)
- Position: Midfield / half-forward

Club information
- Current club: Brisbane Lions
- Number: 19

Playing career^{1}
Years	Club	Games (Goals)
2015–2017	Brisbane Lions	2 (0)
- ^{1} Playing statistics correct to the end of 2017.

Josh Clayton (born 17 January 1996) is a former professional Australian rules footballer who played for the Brisbane Lions in the Australian Football League (AFL). He is the son of former Fitzroy player and Gold Coast list manager, Scott Clayton, and was drafted under the father-son rule.

Clayton showed promise as a versatile player from a young age and played with the Sandringham Dragons in the TAC Cup and for Vic Metro in the 2014 AFL Under 18 Championships. After he was drafted, he played various roles in Brisbane's reserves team in the North East Australian Football League, but his inconsistency meant that he was only able to play in two AFL matches before he was delisted at the end of the 2017 season.

== Early life ==
Due to his prospects as a potential father-son selection, Clayton was able to train with the Brisbane Lions for two weeks in December 2013 and January 2014. In 2014, he played for the Sandringham Dragons in the TAC Cup and also represented Victoria Metro at the 2014 AFL Under 18 Championships. He played in a number of different positions, usually as a forward or midfielder and averaged 21.9 disposals per match in the TAC Cup.

== AFL career ==
Clayton was drafted by the Brisbane Lions with their sixth selection and the eighty-sixth overall under the father–son rule in the 2014 national draft. Due to being a father-son selection and chosen in advance of the draft itself, Clayton was able to begin training with Brisbane a month early in November. His first season was expected to be mainly focused on development and he didn't play any games in the AFL in his first season, instead spending time playing for Brisbane's reserves side in the NEAFL playing in a number of different roles while the team suffered many player losses due to injuries. Though his initial contract lasted until the end of the 2016 season, he signed a contract extension at the end of 2015, adding another year to his contract and tying him at the club until 2017.

In 2016, Clayton played mainly across half-forward, but also had many stints across half-back throughout the season. Despite inconsistent form, he impressed enough to make his debut in Brisbane's sixty point loss to Geelong in round 22 at the Gabba. He averaged 19 disposals per game in the NEAFL, but in the two AFL games he played as a half-forward he only managed a combined total of 12 disposals. He was delisted at the conclusion of the 2017 season.

== Player profile ==
Clayton is a versatile player, who throughout his career played in the forward line, midfield and in defence. During his career, he was known for his athleticism and decision-making while in possession of the football. He also had good aerial skills and lateral movement, allowing him to easily move through traffic in the midfield. He also showed prowess as a forward with his fast and smart leading. For a while he played across half-back in the NEAFL, but struggled more in defence than he did elsewhere on the ground. In his two AFL games, he was noted for his running ability.

== Personal life ==
Clayton's father is Scott Clayton, who played 160 games for Fitzroy and worked as Gold Coast's list manager. This helped Clayton with his adjustment to AFL even though Scott worked for a different club than the one that Clayton was drafted by.

== Statistics ==
Statistics are correct to the end of the 2017 season

Legend
G	Goals	K	Kicks	D	Disposals	T	Tackles
B	Behinds	H	Handballs	M	Marks

Season	Team	No.	Games	Totals							Averages (per game)						
Season	Team	No.	Games	G	B	K	H	D	M	T	G	B	K	H	D	M	T
2015	Brisbane Lions	19	—	—	—	—	—	—	—	—	—	—	—	—	—	—	—
2016	Brisbane Lions	19	2	0	1	8	4	12	5	4	0.0	0.5	4.0	2.0	6.0	2.5	2.0
2017	Brisbane Lions	19	—	—	—	—	—	—	—	—	—	—	—	—	—	—	—
Career			2	0	1	8	4	12	5	4	0.0	0.5	4.0	2.0	6.0	2.5	2.0
