= MonashHeart =

MonashHeart (formerly known as Cardiology, Monash Medical Centre)

Geography
- Location: Melbourne, Clayton, Victoria, Victoria, Australia
- Coordinates: 37.9194°S 145.1214°E

Organisation
- Care system: Medicare, Public, Private
- Type: Specialist, Teaching, Research
- Affiliated university: Monash University

Services
- Beds: 83 (across three sites)

History
- Founded: 2007

MonashHeart is a non-profit cross-site cardiological service operating within the southern region of Victoria's Metropolitan Health Services.

MonashHeart is co-located with Monash Medical Centre and is part of Monash Health, the largest public health service in Victoria. MonashHeart operates from three sites, all within the Southern Health network of hospitals covering populations located south-east of Melbourne. Clinical services are provided at Monash Medical Centre, Clayton, Dandenong Hospital and Casey Hospital.

The MonashHeart service will relocate to the new Victorian Heart Hospital, Australia's first standalone cardiac hospital, when it's completed in 2022.

The current director is Professor Stephen Nicholls.

MonashHeart is one of the premier cardiac services the world, ranked 45 in the 2021 World's Best Specialised Hospitals.

== History ==
MonashHeart is an amalgamation of the former Departments of Cardiology of Monash Medical Centre, Clayton and Dandenong Hospital. In 2007, the two departments were merged to create one service across multiple sites (Clayton, Victoria and Dandenong, Victoria), creating MonashHeart.

Ian Meredith was the director from 2005 to 2017.

On 26 May 2009, Victorian Health Minister at the time, Daniel Andrews officially opened the third site for MonashHeart at Casey Hospital in Berwick, Victoria

MonashHeart is named after Sir John Monash (1865-1931), the highly decorated Australian military commander of the First World War.

== Services ==
MonashHeart's services are divided into six clinical service sub-specialities:

- Acute cardiac
- Non-invasive imaging
- Cardiac Computed Tomography (CT)
- Paediatric cardiology and congenital heart disease
- Cardiac rhythm management
- Interventional

== Research and education ==
The Monash Cardiovascular Research Centre (MCRC) is a self-funding, independent research group within the Faculty of Medicine, Nursing and Health Sciences at Monash University (through the Southern Clinical School and Departments of Medicine and Surgery, Monash Medical Centre).

== Medical firsts ==
- First robotic heart operation in the southern hemisphere
- First Arctic Front case in Australia
- First WATCHMAN case in Australia
- First Australian centre approved for independent percutaneous valve replacement

== Notable cases ==
- Victoria's youngest person to have a heart rate monitored over the internet

== See also ==
- Healthcare in Australia
