= Louis Butler (footballer) =

Australian football league player

Personal information
- Born: 26 August 2001 (age 25); New Zealand
- Original teams: Sandringham Dragons, Brighton Grammar School
- Draft: No. 53, 2019 AFL draft, Western Bulldogs
- Debut: 25 June 2020, Western Bulldogs vs. Sydney, at SCG
- Height: 184 cm (6 ft 0 in)
- Weight: 75 kg (165 lb)
- Position: Defender/Midfielder

Playing career^{1}
Years	Club	Games (Goals)
2020–2022	Western Bulldogs	4 (0)
- ^{1} Playing statistics correct to the end of 2022 AFL Season.

Louis Butler (born 26 August 2001) is a former Australian rules footballer who played for the Western Bulldogs in the Australian Football League (AFL). He was recruited by the Western Bulldogs with the 53rd draft pick in the 2019 AFL draft.

== Early football ==
Butler played for, and captained his side at Brighton Grammar School. He also played for the Sandringham Dragons in the NAB League, and was selected to play for Vic Metro in the AFL Under 18 Championships.

== AFL career ==
Butler debuted in the 4th round of the 2020 AFL season, against the Sydney Swans. In his first game, he picked up 14 disposals.

He was delisted by the Western Bulldogs at the conclusion of the 2022 AFL season.

== Statistics ==
Statistics are correct to the 2020 season

Legend
G	Goals	K	Kicks	D	Disposals	T	Tackles
B	Behinds	H	Handballs	M	Marks

Season	Team	No.	Games	Totals							Averages (per game)						
Season	Team	No.	Games	G	B	K	H	D	M	T	G	B	K	H	D	M	T
2020	Western Bulldogs	18	2	0	1	24	6	30	6	1	0.0	0.5	12.0	3.0	15.0	3.0	0.5
Career			2	0	1	24	6	30	6	1	0.0	0.5	12.0	3.0	15.0	3.0	0.5
