= David Wittey =

Australian rules footballer

Personal information
- Full name: David Wittey
- Born: 10 April 1966 (age 60)
- Original team: Old Brighton Grammarians
- Draft: No. 16, 1989 pre-season draft
- Height: 193 cm (6 ft 4 in)
- Weight: 82 kg (181 lb)

Playing career^{1}
Years	Club	Games (Goals)
1986–1987	St Kilda	24 (0)
1990	Sydney Swans	1 (0)
Total		25 (0)
- ^{1} Playing statistics correct to the end of 1990.

David Wittey (born 10 April 1966) is a former Australian rules footballer who played with St Kilda and the Sydney Swans in the Victorian/Australian Football League (VFL/AFL).

Wittey, a half back from Old Brighton Grammarians, made his debut in the opening round of the 1986 VFL season against Footscray and had 17 disposals. He went on to appear in St Kilda's first 15 games of the year before losing his place in the side. In the 1987 pre-season, Wittey was involved in an incident with teammate Tony Lockett during a practice match. Wittey was struck with a round-arm punch to the head from Lockett and the full-forward was reported by the goal umpire.

Wittey was selected by the Brisbane Bears in the 1989 Pre-season Draft but did not play a senior game for the club. The following season he was drafted by Sydney and made his only appearance in round 11 of the 1990 AFL season.
