= Paul Bassat =

Australian attorney and businessman

Paul Moss Bassat
- Born: Australia
- Education: University of Melbourne
- Occupations: Attorney and businessman

Paul Moss Bassat is an Australian attorney and businessman. He co-founded online job search website Seek Limited in 1997t. The brothers were co-CEOs until Paul resigned in 2011. Bassat is a Commissioner of the Australian Football League, a director of Wesfarmers Ltd, a board member of Rokt, and co-founder of Square Peg Capital.

== Career ==
Paul Bassat was one of three children born to immigrant parents. His father was an Egyptian-born IBM executive, and his mother was a Polish-born lawyer. He attended Brighton Grammar School, where he has been inducted into the school Hall of Fame. Bassat graduated with a Bachelor of Laws and Bachelor of Commerce from the University of Melbourne.

After practicing law at Arnold Bloch Leibler for six years, Bassat co-founded Seek with his brother Andrew and Matt Rockman in 1997. Their goal was to resolve what they felt were inefficiencies in the existing classified-ad systems. Paul was the joint CEO of the company from 1997 until 2011, he then left SEEK to work in private equity and with early-stage investment fund Square Peg Capital, where he is involved in mentoring management teams that are focused on building outstanding businesses.

In 2012, Bassat became a Commissioner of the Australian Football League. He was only the third Jewish member of the Commission in league history.
