= Will Thursfield =

Australian rules footballer

Personal information
- Full name: William Thursfield
- Born: 19 April 1986 (age 40); Oxford, England
- Original team: Ormond/Sandringham
- Draft: 1st overall, 2004 Rookie Draft; Richmond
- Height: 191 cm (6 ft 3 in)
- Weight: 85 kg (187 lb)
- Position: Full back

Playing career^{1}
Years	Club	Games (Goals)
2005–2011	Richmond	77 (0)
- ^{1} Playing statistics correct to the end of 2011.

Career highlights
- AFL Rising Star nominee: 2007

William Thursfield (born 19 April 1986) is a former Australian rules footballer who played for the Richmond Football Club in the Australian Football League (AFL). He is an elevated rookie.

Thursfield was born in Oxford in England, moving to Australia at age 3.

Will attended Brighton Grammar and in years 8–10 and played in the 1st XVII. In 2003 he played in the combined APS team against AGS (Associated Grammar Schools).

2004 saw Will play for the Sandringham Dragons Under 18s TAC Cup team as vice-captain.

Thursfield made his debut in round 14, 2005 against eventual premiers Sydney. His first assignment was handling key-forward Michael O'Loughlin. He impressed straight away by keeping the Swans forward to 1 goal, as the Tigers upset Sydney by a solitary point.

Thursfield retired at the end of the 2011 season, having played ten senior matches for the year. He stated that, although he was "proud to have played the game at the highest level over the past seven seasons", there were "some other avenues in [his] life" that he was "keen to pursue".
