= Seek Limited =

Australian recruitment website

SEEK
- Type: Public
- Traded as: ASX: SEK; S&P/ASX 200 component
- Industry: Employment
- Founded: November 1997; 29 years ago
- Founders: Andrew Bassat; Paul Bassat; Matt Rockman
- Headquarters: Melbourne, Australia
- Area served: Australia, New Zealand, China, Indonesia, Bangladesh, Philippines, Vietnam, Thailand, Malaysia, Hong Kong and Singapore
- Key people: Ian Narev (CEO)
- Products: Job hunting
- Revenue: ▲ A$1,097 million (2025)
- Net income: ▲ A$245.6 million (2025)
- Total assets: ▲ A$4,765.5 million (2025)
- Total equity: ▲ A$2,699.3 million (2025)
- Number of employees: 3,300
- Website: au.seek.com

SEEK Limited is an Australian employment website for job listings, headquartered in Melbourne, Victoria. SEEK also operates in China, Hong Kong, Indonesia, Malaysia, New Zealand, Philippines, Singapore and Thailand. The company has expanded into other business areas such as SEEK Investments (an investment arm), SEEK Learning (career development), SEEK Volunteer (volunteering options) and SEEK Business (promoting businesses that are for sale).

== History ==
SEEK was founded in November 1997 by Andrew Bassat, Paul Bassat and Matt Rockman along with first employees Robert Sloan and Adam Ryan as an online version of print employment classifieds, and it launched its website in March 1998. By 2000, the company had received investment from venture capitalists. On 18 April 2005, SEEK was floated on the Australian Securities Exchange with a market capitalisation of $587 million.

Between 2000 and 2010, the company expanded internationally, with a focus on Asian and Latin American markets, achieving success in locations such as China, whilst expansion into the Brazilian market proved to be more challenging.

In 2012, Paul Bassat left and co-founded Square Peg Capital. Ernst & Young named Andrew Bassat as Australian Entrepreneur of the Year in 2013, with him later stepping down from his role as CEO, in 2021. In May 2022, the company moved its head office to a newly-constructed building in Cremorne, Victoria.

In June 2024, SEEK sold its holdings in the Latin American job-boards OCC (Mexico) and Catho (Brazil). These business interests were sold to Barcelona based Red Arbor, a company operating a number of job boards in the Latin America market.

In 2026, the company's investment arm, SEEK Investments, sought to sell their remaining stake in Employment Hero, which they had invested in some years earlier, after a court case (that was subsequently dropped by Employment Hero) between the companies, over Employment Hero's access to SEEK's job posting API. SEEK had sold some of their stake previously.
